= List of programmes broadcast by Bangladesh Television =

This is the list of all programming currently or has aired on the state-owned Bangladesh Television.

== Domestic ==
- Aaj Robibar (1999)
- Agun Pakhir Basha
- Anondomela
- Anondo Songbad (2006)
- Ayomoy (1990–1991)
- BBC Janala Mojay Mojay Shekha (2010–2012)
- Bishaash (2010–2011)
- Bohubrihi (1988–1989)
- Chayachondo
- Dhakay Thaki (1984–1985)
- Doshe Dosh
- Ei Shob Din Ratri (1985–1985)
- Gaan Chirodin
- Ittyadi (1989–present)
- Jatra
- Jodi Kichhu Mone Na Koren (1977–1985)
- Jonaki Jole
- Jungle Mangal (2022)
- Kothao Keu Nei (1993–1994)
- Mati O Manush
- Meena
- Nokkhotrer Raat
- National Debate
- Notun Kuri (1976–present)
- Onek Kotha Bolar Chilo
- Poriborton
- Pother Pechali
- Roopnagar
- Rupali Dheu
- Shomoyer Kotha
- Sisimpur (2005–present)
- Songsoptok
- Taroka Kothon
- Ujan Ganger Naiya
- Zindabahar

== International ==
- A Disney Christmas Gift
- Airwolf
- Akbar The Great
- Amazon
- Alif Laila
- Babar
- Barney & Friends
- Brum
- Bananas in Pyjamas
- Beethoven
- Bionic Six
- Captain Planet and the Planeteers
- Care Bears
- Charlie Chaplin
- Dallas
- Dark Justice
- Earth: Final Conflict
- Faerie Tale Theatre
- Family Ties
- Feluda
- Godzilla: The Series
- Hatim
- Hawaii Five-O
- Hercules: The Legendary Journeys
- Highway To Heaven
- Honey, I Shrunk the Kids
- Jumanji
- Knight Rider
- Kung Fu
- Lois & Clark: The New Adventures of Superman
- Lonesome Dove
- Lonesome Dove: The Series
- Looney Tunes
- MacGyver
- Marimar
- Memories of Midnight
- Miami Vice
- Mysterious Island
- Mortal Kombat: Conquest
- Mowgli: The New Adventures of the Jungle Book
- Mr. Bean
- Northern Exposure
- Oshin
- Ocean Girl
- Perfect Strangers
- Peter Pan
- Raven
- Ripley's Believe It or Not! (2000-03)
- RoboCop: The Series
- Saber Rider and the Star Sheriffs
- Samurai X
- Sky Trackers
- Spellbinder
- Spenser: For Hire
- Street Hawk
- Tales of the Gold Monkey
- Team Knight Rider
- Teenage Mutant Ninja Turtles
- The A-Team
- The Adventures of Sinbad
- The Bill Cosby Show
- The Bionic Woman
- The Crystal Maze
- The Equalizer (TV series)
- The Fall Guy
- The Girl from Tomorrow
- The Lost World
- The Miraculous Mellops
- The Mysteries of The Dark Jungle
- The New Adventures of Jonny Quest
- The New Adventures of Robin Hood
- The New Woody Woodpecker Show
- The Real Ghostbusters
- The Simpsons
- The Smurfs
- The Three Stooges
- The Twilight Zone
- The Sensitive Samurai (Ude ni oboe ari)
- The Sword of Tipu Sultan
- The Wizard
- The X-Files
- Thunder Cats
- Thunder in Paradise
- Time Trax
- Tom and Jerry
- Twin Peaks
- Woody Woodpecker
- The Six Million Dollar Man
- The Wild Wild West
- The Saint
- WWE
- WWE Afterburn
