= Banglavision =

Bangladeshi television channel

- Country: Bangladesh
- Broadcast area: Nationwide
- Headquarters: Noor Tower, Bir Uttam C.R. Dutta Road, Dhaka

Programming
- Language: Bengali
- Picture format: 1080i HDTV (downscaled to 16:9 576i for SDTV sets)

Ownership
- Owner: Shamol Bangla Media Limited

History
- Launched: 31 March 2006; 20 years ago

Links
- Website: Official website

Banglavision (Bengali: বাংলাভিশন) is a Bangladeshi Bengali-language satellite and cable television channel owned by Shamol Bangla Media Limited. Its name is a portmanteau of "bangla" and "television". Banglavision is based in the Noor Tower situated at 110 Bir Uttam C.R. Dutta Road in Dhaka.

== History ==
Banglavision applied for a broadcasting license on 30 May 2004, which the Bangladesh Telecommunication Regulatory Commission granted them on 31 January 2005. On the same day, Boishakhi Television and Channel 1 also received their licenses. Banglavision has also received approval to broadcast internationally. The channel commenced test transmissions on 25 December 2005 at 18:00 (BST), and officially began broadcasting on 31 March 2006 with the "Drishti Jure Desh" (দৃষ্টি জুড়ে দেশ; lit. 'Country across the vision') slogan, with its objective to showcase the Bengali culture to audiences. Banglavision originally broadcast via the Telstar 10 satellite, but later switched to broadcasting using Apstar-7. It later began broadcasting via the Bangabandhu-1 satellite.

In 2010, Banglavision premiered Lal Golap, a magazine show hosted by Shafik Rehman, after being moved from BTV. Banglavision began airing the Kache Ashar Golpo telefilms on 14 February 2014. On the occasion of the month of Ramadan, Banglavision was one of the eight television channels to broadcast the cooking series Pran Premium Ghee Star Cook in July 2014. Banglavision was one of the nine Bangladeshi television channels to sign an agreement with Bdnews24.com to subscribe to a video-based news agency run by children called Prism in May 2016.

On 1 December 2024, Lal Golap began airing again on the channel after being off-air from 16 April 2016. Banglavision is one of the Bangladeshi channels whose YouTube channels were geo-blocked in India on 9 May 2025, citing threat to national security concerns during the 2025 India–Pakistan conflict. In June 2025, Kazi Jesin's Point of Order, which went off the air in the early 2010s under pressure from the Awami League–led government, began airing again after nearly fifteen years. The channel premiered the Turkish historical drama series Payitaht: Abdülhamid, localized as Sultan Abdulhamid, on 1 September 2025.

== Programming ==
Banglavision's programming is diversified, consisting of drama, news, music, and much more.

=== List of programming ===
- Agamir Kantho
- Amar Ami
- Article 39
- Aw-er Golpo
- Bhodropara
- Bijlee Maholla
- Bou Dour
- Broken Family
- Chondrobindu
- Common Problem
- Ebong Class-er Baire
- Ek Jhak Mrito Jonaki
- Fifty-Fifty
- Ghorey Bairey
- Gulshan Avenue
- Harkipte
- Jamai Mela
- Jogphol (2008–09)
- Kache Ashar Golpo
- Khelowar
- Kingbotondir Dhaka
- Khoj
- Lal Golap
- Life in Metro
- Lucky Thirteen
- Mama Bhagney
- Mangolee Nacho Bangladesh Nacho
- Mohanagar
- Music Club
- Nij Grihe Porobashi
- Payitaht: Abdülhamid
- Pingol Akash
- Point of Order
- Ronger Dunia
- Shomudro Jol
- Shopnochura
- Shunyo Pata
- Three Sisters

== Controversies ==
On 29 June 2009, the presenter of talk show Point of Order, Kazi Jesin, was sent death threats through a leaflet sent to her home, accusing her show of having anti-Islamic themes. Jesin subsequently filed a general diary at the Mohammadpur police station. Banglavision was urged by the government not to broadcast a three-part documentary series on a hangman in December 2010 due to fears that it could frighten children. On 12 March 2012, cable operators in many areas around Bangladesh imposed a temporary blackout on Banglavision, along with the unrelated Ekushey Television, after both channels reported on a BNP rally in detail. In November 2015, Banglavision was among the channels asked by the information ministry about smoking scenes found in their television series.

== See also ==
- List of television stations in Bangladesh
