= BTV Rangpur =

Television station of Bangladesh Television in Rangpur

Bangladesh Television Rangpur Subcenter; বাংলাদেশ টেলিভিশন রংপুর উপকেন্দ্র
- Type: Relay station
- Country: Bangladesh
- Broadcast area: Rangpur Division
- Network: BTV Dhaka
- Headquarters: Satgara, Rangpur

Programming
- Language: Bengali

Ownership
- Owner: Government of Bangladesh
- Parent: Bangladesh Television

History
- Launched: December 1978; 47 years ago

Availability

Terrestrial
- Analog terrestrial: VHF channel 6

Bangladesh Television Rangpur or BTV Rangpur (Bengali: বিটিভি রংপুর) is a BTV-affiliated relay television station broadcast from Rangpur, serving the namesake division in the North Bengal region. It is one of the two relay television stations of Bangladesh Television serving the Rangpur Division, with the other being broadcast from Thakurgaon. Established in December 1978, it is yet to be converted into a regional television station. BTV Rangpur is headquartered in the city's Satgara neighborhood.

== History ==
BTV Rangpur commenced operations in December 1978 on VHF channel 6 with a 10 kilowatt transmitter. As of August 1989, BTV Rangpur broadcast with an increased 360 kilowatt transmitter.

After the 26th meeting of the parliamentary standing committee relating to the Ministry of Information held on 2 May 2011, the committee suggested the relay stations of BTV in Rangpur and Khulna to upgrade to regional television stations. In May 2014, however, then prime minister Sheikh Hasina rejected a proposal by the Information and Broadcasting Ministry to upgrade some of BTV's relay stations, including the one in Rangpur, to full-fledged television stations while expressing her dissatisfaction with the quality of programmes broadcast on BTV at the time. Despite this, Bangladesh Television later sought 13,910,000 BDT in 2017 for five new full-fledged stations to be launched, including BTV Rangpur.

On 8 January 2021, in response to the questions asked by journalists at the Rangpur Circuit House, then information and broadcasting minister Hasan Mahmud stated that it would be possible for BTV Rangpur to begin full-fledged broadcasts within the next two and a half years. He reiterated the statement that BTV Rangpur would become a regional station during his visit to the headquarters of the station on 1 August 2023, also stating that it would benefit local artists, writers, and intellectuals if a full-fledged television station is launched.
