= BTV Khulna =

Television station of Bangladesh Television in Khulna

Bangladesh Television Khulna Subcenter; বাংলাদেশ টেলিভিশন খুলনা উপকেন্দ্র
- Type: Relay station
- Country: Bangladesh
- Broadcast area: Khulna Division
- Network: BTV Dhaka
- Headquarters: Khalishpur, Khulna

Programming
- Language: Bengali

Ownership
- Owner: Government of Bangladesh
- Parent: Bangladesh Television

History
- Launched: 11 March 1977; 49 years ago

Links
- Website: btv.gov.bd

Availability

Terrestrial
- Analog terrestrial: VHF channel 11
- Digital terrestrial: VHF channel 8

Bangladesh Television Khulna or BTV Khulna is a BTV-affiliated relay television station broadcasting from Khulna, serving southwestern Bangladesh. Established on 11 March 1977, it relays programming from the main television station of BTV in Dhaka.

There have been multiple, though unsuccessful, attempts to convert BTV Khulna into a full-fledged regional television station. It is headquartered in the Khalishpur Thana of Khulna. BTV Khulna is one of the three relay stations of Bangladesh Television serving the Khulna Division; the two others being in Jhenaidah and Satkhira.

== History ==
=== Initial plans and establishment ===
In the 1960s, when BTV was a part of Pakistan Television, as Bangladesh itself was part of Pakistan at the time, there were plans to establish relay television stations in Khulna, Chittagong, and Rajshahi by June 1970. However, experimental broadcasts from the station only commenced in the year 1976, after the independence of Bangladesh. Another station in Khulna Division, broadcast from Jessore, was planned to be established by the end of 1975. A two-floor building, equipped with a 500-feet broadcasting tower and a high power transmitter, was built for the station in the Khalishpur Thana of the city. It officially went on the air on 11 March 1977. The station initially broadcast using 10 kilowatts of power and spanning 80 aeronautical kilometers.

As of August 1989, BTV Khulna broadcast on VHF channel 11 with an upgraded 90 kilowatt transmitter. On 23 March 2005, BTV Khulna, alongside sister relay stations in Jhenaidah and Satkhira, went off the air temporarily as renovation works were taking place in their headquarters, which continued until 2 April. This affected terrestrial viewers in the three aforementioned districts, along with Jessore and Narail. Experimental broadcasts on digital terrestrial television from Khulna commenced on 25 January 2011.

=== Attempts to convert ===
During a public meeting in the Khalishpur Prabhati School in Khulna held on 5 March 2011, former Bangladeshi prime minister Sheikh Hasina announced that BTV Khulna will fully commence transmissions as a regional station. Alongside other high officials, the then Director General of Bangladesh Television, M Hamid, visited the headquarters of Khulna station on 5 October 2012. Later, on 26 January 2013, at a meeting at Khulna Press Club, M Hamid announced that BTV Khulna would become a full-fledged station, subsequently setting up new broadcasting facilities and then starting test broadcasts. It was supposed to officially be launched on 16 December 2013, but as the facilities were brought to Dhaka from the Khulna station, this was postponed.

However, in May 2014, Sheikh Hasina rejected a proposal by the Information and Broadcasting Ministry to upgrade some of BTV's relay stations, including the one in Khulna, to full-fledged television stations while expressing her dissatisfaction with the quality of programmes broadcast on BTV at the time. Nevertheless, Bangladesh Television later sought 13,910,000 BDT for five new full-fledged stations to be launched, including BTV Khulna. The same announcement to convert BTV Khulna into a full-fledged station was made in 2015 by then Minister of Information, Hasanul Haque Inu, and 2021 by Hasan Mahmud. There were calls by the people of Khulna to take appropriate measures to fully convert BTV Khulna to a regional station from a relay one, thus preserving the local culture of the Khulna region.
