= BTV Rajshahi =

Television station of Bangladesh Television in Rajshahi

Bangladesh Television Rajshahi Subcenter; বাংলাদেশ টেলিভিশন রাজশাহী উপকেন্দ্র
- Type: Relay station
- Country: Bangladesh
- Broadcast area: Rajshahi Division
- Network: BTV Dhaka
- Headquarters: Kazihata, Rajshahi

Programming
- Language: Bengali

Ownership
- Owner: Government of Bangladesh
- Parent: Bangladesh Television

History
- Launched: 13 June 2001; 24 years ago

Links
- Website: btv.rajshahi.gov.bd

Availability

Terrestrial
- Analog terrestrial: VHF channel 12

Bangladesh Television Rajshahi or BTV Rajshahi (Bengali: বিটিভি রাজশাহী) is a BTV-affiliated relay television station broadcast from Rajshahi, serving the namesake division in the North Bengal region. It is one of the two relay stations of Bangladesh Television serving the division, with the other being broadcast from Natore. Established on 13 June 2001, it is yet to be converted into a regional television station. BTV Rajshahi is headquartered in the city's Kazihata neighborhood.

== History ==
Prior to the independence of Bangladesh, there were plans by Pakistan Television to establish 10-kilowatt relay television stations in Rajshahi, Chittagong, and Khulna by June 1970. However, a television station in nearby Natore was established instead in 1974 by the then leader of Bangladesh, Sheikh Mujibur Rahman, becoming the first television station of BTV outside Dhaka.

There was a movement calling for the establishment of a television station in Rajshahi in the early 1990s. In the wake of such a movement, the BNP-led government took measures to establish a full-fledged television studio in the city in 1994, reserving 3.88 acres of land in Kazihata for the headquarters building. Later, the station was formally established on 13 June 2001 by the then prime minister Sheikh Hasina as a relay one. She pledged to establish a full-fledged television station in Rajshahi, proposing a master plan, which included the construction of a studio building. However, the studio was not built and the proposal was left abandoned shortly after the coalition government took over.

Later in 2008, during the general election, the Awami League-led Grand Alliance reiterated the pledge to convert BTV Rajshahi into a full-fledged television station, yet this still did not progress much. After the 26th meeting of the parliamentary standing committee relating to the Ministry of Information held on 2 May 2011, then information minister Abul Kalam Azad ordered to take necessary measures to convert BTV Rajshahi into a regional station. In May 2014, however, Sheikh Hasina rejected a proposal by the Information and Broadcasting Ministry to upgrade some of BTV's relay stations, including the one in Rajshahi, to full-fledged television stations while expressing her dissatisfaction with the quality of programmes broadcast on BTV at the time.

Later, another initiative to convert the station was taken in July 2014 after Jatiya Sangsad member Fazle Hossain Badsha, representing Rajshahi-2, sent a semi-official letter to then minister of information Hasanul Haq Inu, which stated that the people of Rajshahi had been longing for a regional television station. Bangladesh Television later sought 13,910,000 BDT for five new full-fledged stations to be launched, including BTV Rajshahi. While inaugurating a new building at BTV Natore's headquarters on 30 August 2022, then Information and Broadcasting Minister Hasan Mahmud announced that full-fledged television stations of BTV will be established in all divisional cities, including in Rajshahi.
