= BTV Sylhet =

Television station of Bangladesh Television in Sylhet

Bangladesh Television Sylhet Subcenter; বাংলাদেশ টেলিভিশন সিলেট উপকেন্দ্র; ꠛꠣꠋꠟꠣꠖꠦꠡ ꠐꠦꠟꠤꠜꠤꠡꠘ ꠍꠤꠟꠐ
- Type: Relay station
- Country: Bangladesh
- Broadcast area: Sylhet Division
- Network: BTV Dhaka
- Headquarters: Kazitula, Sylhet

Programming
- Language: Bengali

Ownership
- Owner: Government of Bangladesh
- Parent: Bangladesh Television

History
- Launched: March 2000; 26 years ago

Links
- Website: btv.sylhetdiv.gov.bd

Availability

Terrestrial
- Analog terrestrial: VHF channel 7

Bangladesh Television Sylhet or BTV Sylhet (Bengali: বিটিভি সিলেট; Sylheti: ꠛꠤꠐꠤꠜꠤ ꠍꠤꠟꠐ) is a BTV-affiliated relay television station broadcast from Sylhet, serving northeastern Bangladesh, specifically Sylhet Division. Established in June 1977, it relays programming from the main television station of BTV in Dhaka. It is yet to be converted into a regional television station, although an initiative to do so was taken in 1991. BTV Sylhet is headquartered in the Kazitula neighborhood of the city.

== History ==
A 10-kilowatt satellite station in Sylhet was originally planned to be established by the end of 1975. However, it was established in June 1977 in the city's Kazipara neighborhood, broadcasting on VHF channel 7 with a 10-kilowatt transmitter. As of August 1989, BTV Sylhet broadcast with an increased 136 kilowatt transmitter.

In 1991, the BNP-led government took the initiative to convert BTV Sylhet into a full-fledged regional television station in order to highlight the heritage and diversity of the Sylhet region. On 15 December 1995, the foundation stone of the station was laid at Bangladesh Betar's regional headquarters in the city's Tilagor neighborhood by then Finance Minister Saifur Rahman. A modernization project costing 270,000,000 BDT was initially planned but was later abandoned after regime change in 1996. Prior to the 2008 general election, then to be finance minister Abul Maal Abdul Muhith made a pledge to establish a regional television station in Sylhet, although this did not happen even after he took the position.

Due to a lightning strike in 2010, the feeder cable and the divider of the dispatch center of BTV Sylhet were heavily damaged, causing disruptions in terrestrial broadcasts. As a result, BTV Sylhet temporarily went off air for a week on 20 October 2011 for repair work. This caused distress among viewers of the station as they were unable to watch the Bangladesh and West Indies games, whose broadcast rights were solely given to Bangladesh Television.

In May 2014, then prime minister Sheikh Hasina rejected a proposal by the Information and Broadcasting Ministry to upgrade some of BTV's relay stations, including the one in Sylhet, to full-fledged television stations while expressing her dissatisfaction with the quality of programmes broadcast on BTV at the time. However, Bangladesh Television later sought 13,910,000 BDT for five new full-fledged stations to be launched, including BTV Sylhet.

Later, then Information and Broadcasting Minister Hasan Mahmud announced the establishment of a full-fledged television center in Sylhet, as well as an information complex, in a speech at the Sylhet Circuit House during an exchange meeting with the Sylhet metropolitan and divisional Awami League leaders on 28 January 2022.
