= Shama Rahman =

British singer-songwriter and sitarist

Shama Rahman শামা সরয়াত রহমান
- Born: Shama Sarwat Rahman; Al Ain, United Arab Emirates
- Origin: London, England
- Genres: Jazz; punk rock; folk; spoken word; Bengali music
- Occupations: Singer; songwriter; sitarist; composer; actress; scientist
- Instruments: Sitar; vocals; piano; ukulele; guitar
- Years active: 2009–present
- Label: The Gung Ho Down
- Member of: The Shama Rahman Band
- Website: www.shamarahman.bandcamp.com

Shama Sarwat Rahman (Bengali: শামা সরয়াত রহমান) is a British singer-songwriter, sitarist, storyteller, performance artist, filmmaker and actor.

== Early life ==
Rahman was born in Al Ain, United Arab Emirates to Bangladeshi parents, a medical doctor and classical singer. She has lived on three different continents and trained under the tutelage lineage of Pt Ravi Shankar of the Maihar gharana.

== Education ==
Rahman studied molecular biology at University College London. She completed a PhD in joint partnership at Imperial College London, Goldsmiths and the Royal College of Music in the cross-disciplinary field of Complexity Science complexity mathematical tools taken from statistical and chaos theory physics. to study the Neuroscientific Systems of Musical Creativity. This PhD spans musicology, psychology, philosophy, and the physics of emergent behaviour illustrating how the whole system works together.

== Music career ==
Rahman's original band members have included Peter Edwards (piano or clarinet) who also recorded on the album Fable:Time, Domenico Angarano (bass or kaos pad), William Pearce Smith (violin), Christopher Lane (guitar) and Felix Higginbottom (percussion or drumkit), Nicolas Rouger (saxophone), Andres Castellanos (bass) and Oberon King (percussion or drumkit). She writes and arranges all music and lyrics from her poems. Rahman and her band weaves sitar, urban folk, stories and song together. Together with her band she mingles storytelling, metaphysics and poetry into their music and creates multi-layered harmonies and energy-driven lyrical rhythms with international influences evoking genres from punk to folk, classical to jazz, swing to bossa nova, spoken word to dubstep and drum and bass to create their own unique urban jazz folk genre.

Rahman has performed as a solo artist and with her band and various guest artists in Bangladesh, England, Ireland, France, Germany and Bangladesh. She has performed at the Royal Festival Hall, Southbank Centre, headlined the Modern Mela in 2011's Alchemy Festival, and the 2014 London Jazz Festival. Major festivals include The Secret Garden Party, SilFest, SpitalFields Festival, featured on Womad radio, Supersonix festival (supporting Seth Lakeman and Ska Cubano), Wilderness, One Love Festival, special commission for Eastern Electronic Festival, Un-Convention and Fête de la Musique. She played live in the studio at BBC London 94.9 on the Sunny and Shay Show. Her solo performances include India festival in Belfast, opening for Into the Woods musical at the Queen Elizabeth Hall, NYE at The Troubadour.

She has been commissioned by MOJO for a re-interpretation of The Beatles song "Eleanor Rigby" using her own unique jazz-sitar style featuring pianist Peter Edwards. Her solo performances encompass classical sitar (India festival, Belfast), storytelling with the sitar (SHUNT, V&A Museum of Childhood, Tales in the Tower) and her solo project involving 'looped' sitar electric soundscapes where she unconventionally bows it and creates percussion.

In 2014, she toured with in Place of War (IPOW) artists from UK, India, Congo, Zimbabwe and Kenya – Nucleya, OCTOPIZZO, Louis Barabbas, Alesh Officiel – which culminated in four performances at Shambala Festival with Sandie Shaw. She has featured on Asian Dub Foundation's album Signal and the Noise, producers Chemo's LP In The Evening and State of Bengal.

She has also had numerous collaborations with musicians from all over the world, notably with Asian Dub Foundation, State of Bengal, the London Sitar Ensemble at Southbank, London Bulgarian Choir and the Doves at the BBC Radio 2 Electric Proms in the Roundhouse, sitarist/vocalist with Orchestra Elastique on Berlin tour, SHUNT, Salisbury Arts Festival and LIFT, television appearance as sitarist/vocalist with Bangladeshi musician James and recorded with musicians from Bengal, including producer Buno from revolutionary band Bangla.

While at university, Rahman was the head of marketing for Europe's largest internet radio station. She ran music events combining unknown talent with known names. In 2009, after a break of a few years, she resumed this as artistic director and producer of "The Gung Ho Down", which is a showcase platform for performing arts from all genres and disciplines, artist-led collaborations and promotes artists.

In June 2013, Rahman's debut album Fable:Time was released. Each song on the album unveils a chapter in an overall story about how time affects us – its illusions, deceptions and myths. The album mimics the non-linearity of time and is on a circular track listing. From this, she has visualised one overall narrative by creating a series of eight videos which are all episodes in a series. Some of her spoken-word pieces are featured in this album and has led her to perform at the DSC Literary Festival and Hackney Word Festival.

As a music composer for stage and screen her credits include: UK theatre production Harlesden High Street, the BBC drama series Bishaash, BritDoc Mass E Bhat and Bengali film Runaway.

In October 2013, Rahman was interviewed by Nadia Ali on BBC Asian Network.

== Television career ==
From 2010 to 2011, Rahman played the lead role of Zara Rahman in a 24-part bilingual BBC Janala supernatural drama series Bishaash. It was the first ever serial drama shot between Bangladesh and London, England, south Asia's first ever supernatural detective series and was broadcast on Zee Café and Sky.

Rahman has appeared as presenter in China, Bulgaria and for artist Oliver Guy for a Wellcome Trust project on Doubt.

== Discography ==
=== Albums ===
Title	Released	Label	Format	Chart positions	Certifications
Fable:Time	16 June 2013		CD		
Let the Light In	2020		Digital		

== Filmography ==
=== Television ===
Year	Title	Role	Notes
2010–2011	Bishaash	Zara Rahman	24 episodes
2011	50 Ways to Kill Your Lover: Unlucky Curry Lover	Gurjeet	
2012	Runaway	Music composer	
2013	Mass E Bhat	Music composer	

=== Stage ===
Year	Title	Role	Theatre
2013	Harlesden High Street	Music composer	Tara Theatre

== See also ==
- British Bangladeshi
- List of British Bangladeshis
