= Department of Films and Publications =

Media regulation and officials publicity department

- Abbreviation: DFP
- Formation: 1971
- Type: Department
- Legal status: Active
- Purpose: Government publicity, media regulation, and cultural preservation
- Headquarters: Dhaka, Bangladesh
- Location: Circuit House Road, Dhaka, Bangladesh
- Region served: Bangladesh
- Official language: Bengali, English
- Director General (DG): Khaleda Begum
- Parent organization: Ministry of Information and Broadcasting
- Affiliations: Bangladesh Film Archive, Bangladesh Betar
- Website: www.dfp.gov.bd

The Department of Films and Publications (DFP) (Bengali: চলচ্চিত্র ও প্রকাশনা অধিদপ্তর) is a government department of Bangladesh, operating under the Ministry of Information and Broadcasting. It is a body responsible for government publicity, media regulation, and the preservation and dissemination of national culture and information through film and various publications. The department is currently headed by Director General Khaleda Begum and is headquartered on Circuit House Road in Dhaka, Bangladesh.

== History ==
The Department of Films and Publications was established in 1971 by the government of Bangladesh in exile, based in Kolkata during the Bangladesh War of Independence. Its initial role was primarily producing and distributing films and publications to build international support, document the war, and boost the morale of the freedom fighters and the public. Notably, this included works by prominent figures like Zahir Raihan. Following the independence of Bangladesh, the department's role transitioned from wartime propaganda to serving as the primary regulatory and publicity body for the newly formed nation, overseeing media and cultural documentation.

== Functions and structure ==
The DFP is structured into several sections/wings, each responsible for specific aspects of the department's mandate. Its core responsibilities fall into three main areas: Regulation, Publication, and Archiving/Publicity. Regulatory and Licensing Role As a government regulatory department, the DFP exercises control over the media landscape through various mechanisms:

- Newspaper and Periodical Registration: It is responsible for the registration and licensing of newspapers, magazines, and other print publications in Bangladesh. This includes granting the initial name clearance for new publications.
- Media Listing and Advertising: The department prepares the official media list and determines the advertising rates for government advertisements placed in various publications, which plays a major role in the financial sustainability of registered media outlets.
- Film Certification (Indirect): While the Bangladesh Film Censor Board handles the censorship of films for public exhibition, the DFP plays a role in the licensing and promotion aspects of the film industry.

Publications and Government Publicity A significant part of the DFP's mission is to publish and produce work that highlights the history of Bangladesh and the development activities of the government. Key publications and activities include:

- Periodicals: It publishes several regular magazines and journals, such as Sachalchitro Bangladesh (সচিত্র বাংলাদেশ - Pictorial Bangladesh), Nabarun (নবারুণ - The New Sun), and Bangladesh Quarterly (published in English), which focus on national development, culture, and history.
- Ad-Hoc Publications: The DFP frequently publishes special books, brochures, and posters on various national occasions and government achievements.
- Development Communication: The department works closely with other state-run media, like Bangladesh Betar (Bangladesh Radio), to produce and broadcast programs aimed at publicizing government initiatives and pro-development decisions to a wider audience, including through community radios.

Affiliated Institutions and Archiving The DFP is administratively responsible for the Bangladesh Film Archive (BFA), which serves as the national film archive. The BFA's mission is to collect, preserve, research, and exhibit national and international films and related materials, safeguarding Bangladesh's cinematic heritage.

== Key divisions ==
The DFP's internal structure typically includes major wings that manage its daily operations:

- Administration and Publication Wing: Handles the overall administration, human resources, and management of the department's periodical and ad-hoc publishing work.
- Advertisement and Audit Wing: Responsible for setting media advertisement rates, circulating government advertisements, and auditing the circulation figures of registered newspapers and magazines.
- Film Wing: Focuses on the production and distribution of government documentaries, newsreels, and publicity films, as well as overseeing the Bangladesh Film Archive.
- Editorial Sub-Division: Deals with the editing and content creation for the department's publications.
- Registration Wing: Manages the legal processes for the declaration and registration of new newspapers and periodicals under relevant laws, such as the Printing Presses and Publications (Declaration and Registration) Act, 1973.
