= Shamsul Huda =

Bangladeshi civil servant

- শামসুল হুদা
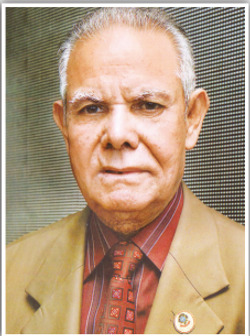
- Born: 1 December 1932 (age 93); Char Chandia, Feni, Bengal Presidency
- Awards: Ekushey Padak (2014)

Shamsul Huda (born 1 December 1932) is a Bangladeshi language activist. He was conferred with Ekushey Padak in 2014 for his contribution to the Language Movement.

== Biography ==
Huda was born on 1 December 1932 to Md. Idris Mia and Rahima Khatun in the island village of Char Chandia off the coast of Sonagazi, Feni, then part of the Noakhali district of the Bengal Presidency. He completed his matriculation from Noakhali. Later, he completed higher secondary studies from Dhaka College. Huda graduated from University of Dhaka. He passed MA from University of Karachi. Later, he received MS degree from University of New South Wales.

Huda took part in the Language Movement. He was among those people who raised objection against the remark of Muhammad Ali Jinnah on state language on the convocation of the University of Dhaka on 24 March 1948. He also took part in protest rallies on 21 February 1952. For taking part in this movement he was arrested. He did not get job from Central Superior Services for his involvement in the Language Movement.

Huda started his career in Directorate of Mass Communication in 1957. He retired from his job in 1989. A book titled Vashasoinik Shamsul Huda : Jiboner Jolchhobi was published on 5 September 2015 by Vasha Andolon Gobeshonakendro O Jadhughar which was based on his biography.

Huda received Ekushey Padak in 2014 for his contribution to the Language Movement.
