= BBC Janala =

- Company type: Mobile, Online, Television, Newspaper
- Industry: Broadcasting
- Genre: Language instruction
- Founded: November 2009
- Area served: Bangladesh
- Website: bbcjanala.com

BBC Janala (Bengali: বিবিসি জানালা; English: BBC Window) is an English–instruction programme for the people of Bangladesh. It launched in November 2009 and is a multi-platform project of UKAID. The Janala includes mobile subscription, television drama and game show and lessons in leading national daily of Bangladesh.

== Aim ==
BBC Janala, a supported program of English in Action, a BBC World Service Trust project, takes it a notch higher with the ambition to raise the English language skills of 27 million Bangladeshis by 2017. By tapping into the growth of Bangladesh’s mobile phone and television industry, BBC Janala is offering affordable English learning tools to millions of people, helping them with the chance of a better job and future.

The project is funded by the UK Department for International Development as part of English in Action, a major educational initiative launched in 2008 to raise the language skills of million Bangladeshi people by 2017. It is a partnership between the BBC World Service Trust and BBC Learning English and draws on the shared expertise of using the media to provide affordable and accessible education to all.

== Contents ==
Contents of BBC Janala is aimed at all levels of experience with 'Essential English' for beginners, ‘Pronunciation’ for intermediaries and ‘Vocabulary in the News’ for those more advanced.

== Medium ==
Mobile
By dialing "3000" a user can access hundreds of English language audio lessons and quizzes. Content is updated weekly and caters to all levels of experience with 'Essential English' for beginners, 'Pronunciation' for intermediaries and 'Vocabulary in the News' for those more advanced. At the end of December 2009 – a month after launching – over 750,000 calls had been made to the mobile phone service.

Internet
BBC Janala program has a dedicated website, where users can access free content and join an online community of learners.

Television
BBC Buzz, a weekly youth entertainment show, broadcast in a prime–time Friday evening slot on satellite channel ATN Bangla, mixes Bangla and English in features, comedy sketches, cartoons and discussions on subjects ranging from climate change to arranged marriage. Launched in October 2009, the show already has five million viewers. In 2010 BBC Janala introduced a TV Drama named Bishaash, the first ever serial drama shot between Bangladesh and London, England. Producer of Bishaash is Mary Hare. Bishaash is a 24-part drama series set in Bangladesh and the UK that will be the first ever supernatural detective series in South Asia.

The series is followed by BBC Janala Mojay Mojay Shekha (Learning with Fun), another educational game show and comedy which expands on the English used in the drama.

Newspaper
BBC Janala regularly publishes daily English learning materials in the Bangladeshi daily newspaper Prothom Alo.

== Achievements ==
- 2011-16th Annual Global Mobile Awards.
- 2010-World Summit Award (WSA) Mobile 2010 in m-Learning and Education Category.
- 2010- Microsoft Education Award

== See also ==
- BBC
- BBC Bangla
- BBC World Service Trust
- List of television programmes broadcast by the BBC
- The Green Book
- List of BBC programmes
