= Shomoyer Kotha =

- Starring: Syed Munir Khasru
- Country of origin: Bangladesh
- No. of episodes: 20 (up to 2008-12-27)

Production
- Executive producer: Abdun Noor Tushar
- Production location: Dhaka, Bangladesh
- Running time: 09:10 PM Fridays, BST

Original release
- Network: BTV
- Release: 22 June 2007 – 27 December 2008

Shomoyer Kotha (Bengali: সময়ের কথা), which translates to Talk of the Time, is a talk show on Bangladesh Television, the state-owned television network in Bangladesh. The programme is planned and hosted by Syed Munir Khasru, a faculty member of Institute of Business Administration, Dhaka University and is directed by Abdun Noor Tushar. The show debuted on 22 June 2007, with the airing of an interview of former US Ambassador to Bangladesh - Patricia Butenis. The very first program drew media attention when Butenis jokingly commented that Bangladeshis sometimes tend to be conspiratorial.

The show airs at 09:10 pm on Fridays; which may be considered the weekend prime time slot as Bangladesh observes weekend on Friday-Saturday. Although a new program, Shomoyer Kotha has received critical acclaims for its attractive and aesthetic set design, quality substance, creative format, and rich information content. Individual episodes of Shomoyer Kotha usually feature selected issues or events of national significance, e.g., electoral and political reform, anti-corruption drive, price hike of essentials and so on. The program occasionally focuses on entertainment oriented topics like new trends in Bengali music, cricket etc.

Shomoyer Kotha begins with some background information on the selected topic presented through a slide show which helps the audience to follow the discussion. At the end of the programme, the major inferences of the discussions are highlighted. The programme has so far interviewed Patricia Butenis, Anwar Chowdhury (British High Commissioner to Bangladesh), country heads of International Monetary Fund and Asian Development Bank and several other prominent personalities. The discussions in the program are in either English or Bengali depending on the preference of the interviewee. The English discussions in the programme are supplemented with Bengali subtitles.
