= Spirit Warriors (TV series) =

British children's television series

- Genre: Fantasy; Drama
- Created by: Jo Ho
- Starring: Jessica Henwick; Benedict Wong; Burt Kwouk; Tom Wu; Lil Simz; Alicia Lai; Gilles Geary; Karl Rogers; Daphne Cheung
- Composer: Matt Dunkley
- Country of origin: United Kingdom
- Original language: English
- No. of series: 1
- No. of episodes: 10

Production
- Running time: 30 min.

Original release
- Network: CBBC
- Release: 22 January – 26 March 2010

Spirit Warriors is a BBC children's adventure series, broadcast on BBC Two, BBC HD and CBBC. It is the first British television drama series to have a predominantly East Asian cast.

Very loosely inspired by ancient Chinese myths and legends, the show follows Bo, her sister Jen, and fellow schoolchildren Vicky, Trix and Martin who, during a trip to a museum, are transported to a parallel spirit world. Once there, they find themselves transformed into Spirit Warriors, each with his or her own special spirit power. With the help of their mentor Shen, a dragon, they have to use their new-found skills to navigate the realms of Wood, Water, Earth and Fire and find twelve legendary spirit pieces before the evil warlord Li and his henchman Hwang can get their hands on them.

The series was created and written by Jo Ho and produced by Nick Pitt. The working title was Bo and the Spirit World. Jon East, who had previously won a BAFTA for the children's docu-drama That Summer Day, was the executive producer, and directed half of the episodes including the start and end of the series. Episodes 4 to 8 were directed by the Australian director Mat King.

The show has been picked up internationally by Norway, South Korea, New Zealand and Singapore.

== Cast ==
The BBC initially sought two young British Chinese or other East Asian actors to play Bo and her brother Timothy, characters aged 13 and 11. The role of Timothy was later changed to female, and it was announced in June 2009 that 16-year-old Jessica Henwick had been cast as Bo. Within the next month, announcements were made about the rest of the cast, including Alicia Lai in the role of the younger sister Jen.

- Bo played by Jessica Henwick
- Shen voiced by Burt Kwouk
- Jen played by Alicia Lai
- Vicky played by Little Simz
- Trix played by Gilles Geary
- Martin played by Karl Rogers
- Li played by Benedict Wong
- Hwang played by Tom Wu
- Fei-Yan played by Daphne Cheung
- Ding-Xiang played by David Yip
- Qi-Shi played by Andy Cheung

== Episodes ==
The first episode premiered on the CBBC channel on Friday 22 January 2010 at 5:45pm, titled "A Warrior is Born".

Following the transmission of the final episode, a backstage documentary exclusive called Spirit Warriors: Backstage aired on 26 March, which included cast interviews and footage from behind the scenes.

| No. | Title | Directed by | Written by | Original release date | Prod. code |
|---|---|---|---|---|---|
| 1 | "A Warrior is Born" | Jon East | Jo Ho | 22 January 2010 | 101 |
After Bo's mother Fei-Yan is discovered mysteriously injured, Bo and her younger sister Jen are sent on a school trip to attend an exhibition of ancient Chinese warriors. There, along with other children visiting the museum—Trix, Vicky and Martin—they find themselves transported to a mysterious cave where they meet Shen, a Chinese water dragon. Shen reveals that they are now in the Spirit World and have become the new Spirit Warriors with an important task to complete. They must collect the 12 magical spirit pieces from the spirit worlds of Wood, Water, Earth and Fire. However, the evil Li and his henchman Hwang are also hunting the pieces, and if Li finds them first, he'll control not only the Spirit World, but also the real world—and Fei-Yan will die.
| 2 | "The Spirit Thief" | Jon East | Joe Williams | 29 January 2010 | 102 |
The warriors learn that the next spirit piece can be found in a town called Piaji—taken over by the cruel ruler Yama. On their journey the warriors are attacked by Hwang and the ruthless Nian warriors. Once in Piaji they find it deserted, apart from the presence of troubled game maker, Qi-Shi, and discover that Yama is in fact a Spirit Thief. After Jen is taken by Yama, the rest of the warriors must not only battle the Spirit Thief but also Hwang, who is hot on their trail. Will Bo and the team work out how to defeat Yama, free the town of Piaji and find the second spirit piece?
| 3 | "The Monkey King" | Jon East | Carol Noble | 5 February 2010 | 103 |
While hunting for the next spirit piece the warriors head to the Monkey kingdom where they are quickly ambushed by the Monkey people. Jen and Trix are captured, but Jen discovers that they can save themselves by challenging the current Monkey King. By proving that she is funnier than him, Jen wins and becomes their new leader. However, her newly found power goes to her head and when Hwang arrives at the monkey palace with a secret weapon, Jen learns that being in charge is not all fun and games.
| 4 | "Your Worst Nightmare" | Mat King | Rebecca Stevens | 12 February 2010 | 104 |
Bo and the warriors move from the realm of wood to that of water in the hunt for the next spirit piece. They soon find it in a ramshackle shop. However, Vicky's bad feelings about the piece are proved right when they realise this spirit piece is cursed with bad luck. After a disastrous battle with Hwang and the Nian, the team discover that their only option is to travel to the Temple Of The Four Winds, where they can cleanse the piece of its curse. However, once at the temple they will each have to confront their own worst nightmares.
| 5 | "The Snake Spirit" | Mat King | Carol Noble | 19 February 2010 | 105 |
While chasing the next spirit piece the warriors are attacked by what appears to be a giant snake, and Bo is bitten. Worse still, Hwang and the Nian choose this moment to pounce, and the team are separated. Luckily Trix and Martin manage to get Bo to the safety of the house of mother and daughter, Weici and Jiao. Jen and Vicky also escape, only to find themselves in a vast graveyard where they meet the mysterious Fung. In order to secure the next spirit piece they must uncover the identity of Fung and discover what, or who, is the snake spirit.
| 6 | "Fortune Favours the Brave" | Mat King | Joe Williams | 26 February 2010 | 106 |
As the quest continues, the warriors visit fortune teller Master Wu who predicts that they will shortly encounter ghost dogs, their dreams will come true, and they will have to enter the Labyrinth Of Lost Spirits. Bo's doubts are soon proved wrong when the predictions come true. While Jen and Vicky's dreams materialise before their eyes, Martin, Trix and Bo apparently enter the Labyrinth Of Lost Spirits. But all is not as it seems and they must work out where they really are in order to get the piece and find their lost friends.
| 7 | "Young at Heart" | Mat King | Elly Brewer | 5 March 2010 | 107 |
Following the clue, "Find the truth where beauty lies", the warriors enter the earth realm and stumble across a strange cave, full of all their favourite foods, straight out of a fairytale. However, the house's owner, the gorgeous Madame Ching, and her sweet man-servant Tai Fai have a terrible secret – and when Jen goes missing the Spirit Warriors need to find out what it is.
| 8 | "The Cave of Ghosts" | Jon East | Emma Reeves | 12 March 2010 | 108 |
When the warriors save Ming from one of Hwang's traps they learn from her that all of the girl's fellow villagers have disappeared after being forced by Hwang to walk the Dark Path in the Cave of Ghosts. In search of the next spirit piece, Ming leads the warriors to the cave where Trix and Vicky encounter ghostly visions and dark secrets from their own private pasts. Can they defy their demons and find the piece – and how long will it be before they meet The Forger?
| 9 | "Wishes" | Jon East | Jo Ho | 19 March 2010 | 109 |
The warriors head into Li's own realm of fire, and in a world of Fire there is no water, so not even Shen can help them. Quickly they discover their next spirit piece in a poor woman's rubbish. However, before they leave they're persuaded by her to head to a nearby peach tree, which grants wishes. There each of the warriors eat a peach and agree to make a wish to find the final spirit piece. However, not all of the warriors keep their word, as Martin desires to impress the others with his wish. Meanwhile Li—losing patience with Hwang—unleashes a dreadful phenomenon and pursues the warriors, determined to steal all of their spirit pieces, and in a world of Fire there is no water, so not even Shen can help them.
| 10 | "The Blood of A Warrior" | Jon East | Jo Ho | 26 March 2010 | 110 |
As the quest concludes, the warriors are helped by an unlikely ally in the form of Hwang. Feeling betrayed by his master Li, Hwang changes sides and presents the warriors with a secret document before sneaking them into Li's palace. There they finally do battle with Li. But just when it looks like Li has defeated the warriors and claimed all the spirit pieces as his own, he leaves them to travel to the world of Gold so he can exact revenge upon a surprise former ally. Soon all the series' shocking secrets and hidden histories are finally revealed in an explosive and emotional finale.

== Production ==
The series was filmed over three months at Three Mills Studios from April 2009. The designer, Catrin Meredydd, procured various set elements from recently completed feature films.

As preparation for her role, Jessica Henwick took wushu training with the series fight choreographer Jude Poyer, a Hong Kong fight director and stunt man who has worked on Asian and American action films with Jet Li and other stars.

The main title track was composed by Matt Dunkley, and the series' costume design was handled by Richard Cooke.

== Press ==
Spirit Warriors was featured in the February issue of Combat magazine, Broadcast magazine, Young Performer magazine, Girl Talk and Top of the Pops magazine among others.

== Reception ==
Creator and writer Jo Ho was nominated for 'Best Breakthrough Talent' at the Cultural Diversity Network Awards 2010. Ho also won the Women in Film and Television's 'New Talent Award'. In November 2010 it was announced that the show also received a nomination for 'Best Children's Programme' at the 2011 Broadcast Awards.

- From the Chinese Community website "Dimsum"'s review of the first episode:

"Finally there are Chinese faces on TV – yes we do exist o world! I feel like holding a party to celebrate. Watching Spirit Warriors is like finally meeting a friend who's ten years late for a party – you're disappointed that they've taken so long but once here you can't help smiling. For truth be told a drama starring East Asian actors as the leads has been long overdue... the BBC have obviously pushed the boat out and got fully behind this series which is great to see."

- From the "Observer" review of the first episode:

"...clever new fantasy drama for children which includes "Crouching Tiger"-style martial arts with CGI characters and live action"
