= Jo Ho =

British film director and screenwriter (born 1977)

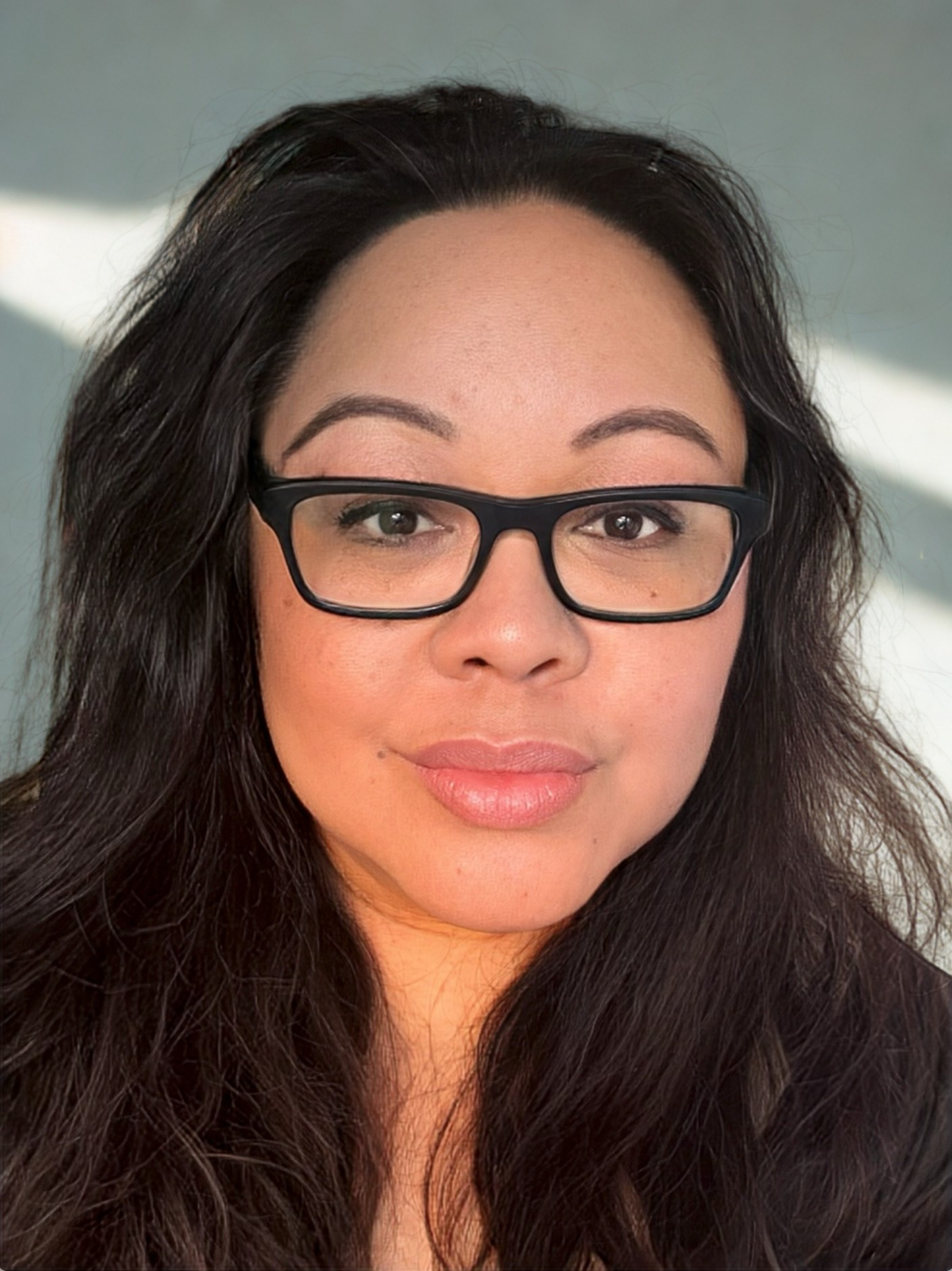
- Jo Ho, 2026
- Born: Dagenham, London, England
- Occupations: Screenwriter, director, author
- Writing career
- Years active: 2002—present
- Website: www.johoscribe.com

Jo Ho is a British-Chinese screenwriter, director and author, best known for creating the BBC series Spirit Warriors. She has been credited as the first East Asian person in the UK to have successfully created an original television drama series. Spirit Warriors is also the UK's first TV drama series to star a predominantly East Asian cast.

== Early life and education ==
Ho was born in Dagenham in London, and studied Mixed Media Arts at the University of Westminster.

== Career ==
Ho taught herself screenwriting by studying The West Wing and Buffy the Vampire Slayer. She went on to work as a production manager on several projects, before writing and directing her first short film Isolation 9 in 2006. The film won the Audience Festival award at the Buffalo-san Short Film Festival. Her next short film Monkey Nut Tales, shot just two months later, was funded by the UK Film Council and Film London as part of the 2006 Digital Shorts Pulse Scheme.

In 2008, Ho was a judge on the BBC Bites Scheme, created to find and encourage British born Chinese writers.

After three years in development, Spirit Warriors began filming in 2009. The series aired in 2010, on BBC HD, BBC Two, and CBBC, and was nominated for "Best Children's Programme" at the 2011 Broadcast Awards. Ho herself won the Women in Film and Television's "New Talent Award" and was nominated for the Cultural Diversity Network Award for "Best Breakthrough Production Talent".

Known for her high concept work, following Spirit Warriors, Ho has worked as a storyline consultant on a supernatural BBC drama series Bishaash and has been engaged to write three feature films: an action film, a teen supernatural romance and a dark fairytale. In 2012 she was working on scripts for on several original feature films and several TV series including a big budget medieval series for acclaimed producers Morgan O'Sullivan and James Flynn (producers of The Borgias, The Tudors and Vikings).

In addition to screenwriting, Ho is also an author. WANTED, Book 1 of The Chase Ryder Series is Ho's first novel. With over 150 five-star reviews, it has been a best-seller in over 15 Young Adult categories on Amazon and recently won the YA Sci-fi category for the Readers' Favorite International Book Awards (2018). Her second YA book series, TWISTED, an urban fantasy serial about four troubled girls who discover they now command some super dark powers was published in 2018.

Ho is a voting member of BAFTA and repped by The Dench Arnold Agency.

The Independent noted her among "five to watch" in the context of ethnic minority writers for British television and film.

== Awards ==
- Wanted, Book 1 of The Chase Ryder Series - winner of the Readers' Favorite Young Adult Sci-Fi Book Award (2018)
- Winner of the University of Westminster's 'Contribution to the Creative Industries' Award (2018)
- Winner of the Women in Film and Television's 'New Talent' Award (2010)
- Spirit Warriors nominated for 'Best Children's Programme' at the Broadcast Awards (2011)
- Nominated for CDN's 'Best Breakthrough Production Talent' Award (2010)
- Big Ben Award for 'Outstanding Achievement by a Chinese Woman in the UK Film and Television Industry' (2009)
- Selected for the acclaimed "Film London PULSE" short film funding scheme to shoot "Monkey Nut Tales" (2006)
- Winner 'Best Film' for her short film Isolation 9 at the Buffalo-san Short Film Festival (2007)

== Books ==
Series	Books	Retailer
Twisted	"What Doesn't Kill You" (2018), author; "Beware The Signs" (2018), author; "See No Evil" (2018), author; "The Blood That Binds" (2018), author; "When Trouble Comes" (2018), author; "Bad Habits" (2018), author; "Left Behind" (2018), author; "Hell Hath No Fury" (2018), author; "In Her Skin" (2018), author; "First Date Jitters" (2018), author; "Grave Matters" (2018), author	Amazon, Kobo, Apple Books, Google Play, Barnes & Noble, Audible, iTunes
The Chase Ryder Series	"Wanted" (2016), author; "Haunted" (2017), author; "Hunted" (2019), author	Amazon, Audible, iTunes

== Filmography ==
=== Writing ===
Production	Notes	Broadcaster
Spirit Warriors	"A Warrior is Born" (2010), creator, writer; "The Spirit Thief" (2010), creator; "The Monkey King" (2010), creator; "Your Worst Nightmare" (2010), creator; "The Snake Spirit" (2010), creator; "Fortune Favours the Brave" (2010), creator; "Young at Heart" (2010), creator; "The Cave of Ghosts" (2010), creator; "Wishes" (2010), creator, writer; "Blood of a Warrior" (2010), creator, writer	BBC
Bishaash	"Janmo Janmantor: Part 1" (2011), storyline consultant; "Janmo Janmantor: Part 2" (2011), storyline consultant; "In/Compatible: Part 1" (2010), storyline consultant; "In/Compatible: Part 2" (2010), storyline consultant; "Twilight: Part 1" (2010), storyline consultant; "Twilight: Part 2" (2010), storyline consultant	BBC Worldwide

=== Directing ===
Production	Notes	Production company
Isolation 9	Short Film	Contingency Films
Monkey Nut Tales	Short Film	Lark Films
