= Atiqul Haque Chowdhury =

- আতিকুল হক চৌধুরী
- Born: 15 December 1930
- Died: 17 June 2013 (aged 82)
- Occupations: Media personality, producer, director, playwright

Atiqul Haque Chowdhury (15 December 1930 – 17 June 2013) was a media personality in Bangladesh and contributed to the development of Bangladesh television and radio.

== Biography ==
Chowdhury began his career as a producer and programme organiser at Radio Pakistan Dhaka in 1960, later joining PTV Dhaka in 1965. Atiqul Haque Chowdhury has been involved in the BTV from late 1970s to late '80s. He started as a producer and retired as the deputy director general of the state-run TV station in 1991. During his tenure, he made over 450 TV plays. A number of radio plays were also written and directed by him.

He was also a guest teacher at the Department of Drama and Dramatics at Jahangirnagar University for 11 years. He later jointed Ekushey Television as an Advisor.

== List of works ==
=== Notable radio productions ===
- Tagore’s Nosto Nirr and Shesher Kobita
- Sharat Chandra’s Pother Dabi, Srikanto and Debdash
- Abu Ishaque’s Surjo Dighol Bari

=== Notable TV productions ===
- Tagore’s Shesher Kobita, Maloncha, Chokher Bali, Drishtidan, Khoka Babur Prottabortan and Guptadhan
- Shawkat Osman’s Kritodasher Hashi
- Nazmul Alam's Koch O Athocho Pabitra
- Humayun Ahmed’s Kushum
- Enamul Haque’s Ghriho Bashi

=== Radio and TV plays written by him, produced by him ===
- Durbin Diya Dekhun
- Nil Nokshar Shondhaney
- Shukher Upoma
- Babar Kolom Kothai?

== Awards ==
- Bangla Academy honorary Fellowship (2010) for writing and directing TV plays,
- Sequence of Merit Award from Bangladesh Shilpakala Academy (twice),
- Honorary Doctorate Degree from World Development Council (New Delhi, 1990) for his contribution to TV plays,
- Best TV Producer Award (1976)
