= BTV Mymensingh =

Television station of Bangladesh Television in Mymensingh

Bangladesh Television Mymensingh Subcenter; বাংলাদেশ টেলিভিশন ময়মনসিংহ উপকেন্দ্র
- Type: Relay station
- Country: Bangladesh
- Broadcast area: Mymensingh Division
- Network: BTV Dhaka
- Headquarters: Akua, Mymensingh

Programming
- Language: Bengali

Ownership
- Owner: Government of Bangladesh
- Parent: Bangladesh Television

History
- Launched: May 1979; 46 years ago

Availability

Terrestrial
- Analog terrestrial: VHF channel 12

Bangladesh Television Mymensingh or BTV Mymensingh (Bengali: বিটিভি ময়মনসিংহ) is a BTV-affiliated relay television station broadcast from Mymensingh, serving the namesake division. It was established in May 1979 and is slated to become a regional television station. BTV Mymensingh is headquartered in the city's Akua neighborhood.

== History ==
BTV Mymensingh commenced operations in May 1979 on VHF channel 12 with a 10-kilowatt transmitter. As of August 1989, BTV Mymensingh broadcast with an increased 398 kilowatt transmitter.

While Bangladesh Television was seeking 13,910,000 BDT for five new full-fledged television stations in March 2017, the then Planning Minister Mustafa Kamal stated that prime minister Sheikh Hasina directed authorities also to include Mymensingh among the stations to be converted on 14 March, as it became a divisional city following the establishment of the Mymensingh Division in 2015.

The station, originally slated to run as regional by December 2018 officially, was mainly set to highlight the current affairs, as well as the local cultures, of the Mymensingh region. It would have initially broadcast five to six hours a day, although the schedule would increase over time. The same announcement to convert the station alongside five others was made twice in 2021 and 2022.
