= National Institute of Mass Communication =

Research institute in Bangladesh

National Institute of Mass Communication জাতীয় গণমাধ্যম ইনস্টিটিউট
- Formation: 1980
- Headquarters: Dhaka, Bangladesh
- Region served: Bangladesh
- Official language: Bengali
- Website: www.nimc.gov.bd

National Institute of Mass Communication is a state owned educational institute that specializes in mass communication and journalism in Bangladesh. Its headquarters are located at A, A. W. Chowdhury Road, Darus Salam Thana, Dhaka. Shahin Islam, ndc is the incumbent director general of the institute.

== History ==
National Institute of Mass Communication জাতীয় গণমাধ্যম ইনস্টিটিউট was established in 1980 as the National Broadcasting Academy. In 1984, according to the recommendation of the Martial Law Committee, of the regime of General Hussain Mohammad Ershad, the National Broadcasting Academy was renamed to National Institute of Mass Communication. Aside from providing courses related to communication the institute also carries out research into mass media. It is under the Ministry of Information.
