= BTV National Debate =

Event about Debating held by Bangladesh Television every year

BTV National Debate is an event held by Bangladesh Television every year. Students of different schools come to attend the event. Quarter final, semi final and finale take place in this event.

== Description ==
BTV gathers school teams from different areas of Bangladesh. Then the debate topic is divided into two teams each. The two teams debate on that topic and the judges and the moderator choose the winning team. The teams with top scores get the chance to be on the quarter final. Thus this event continues and every year a winner team is selected.
