= Mahbuba Farzana =

- মাহবুবা ফারজানা
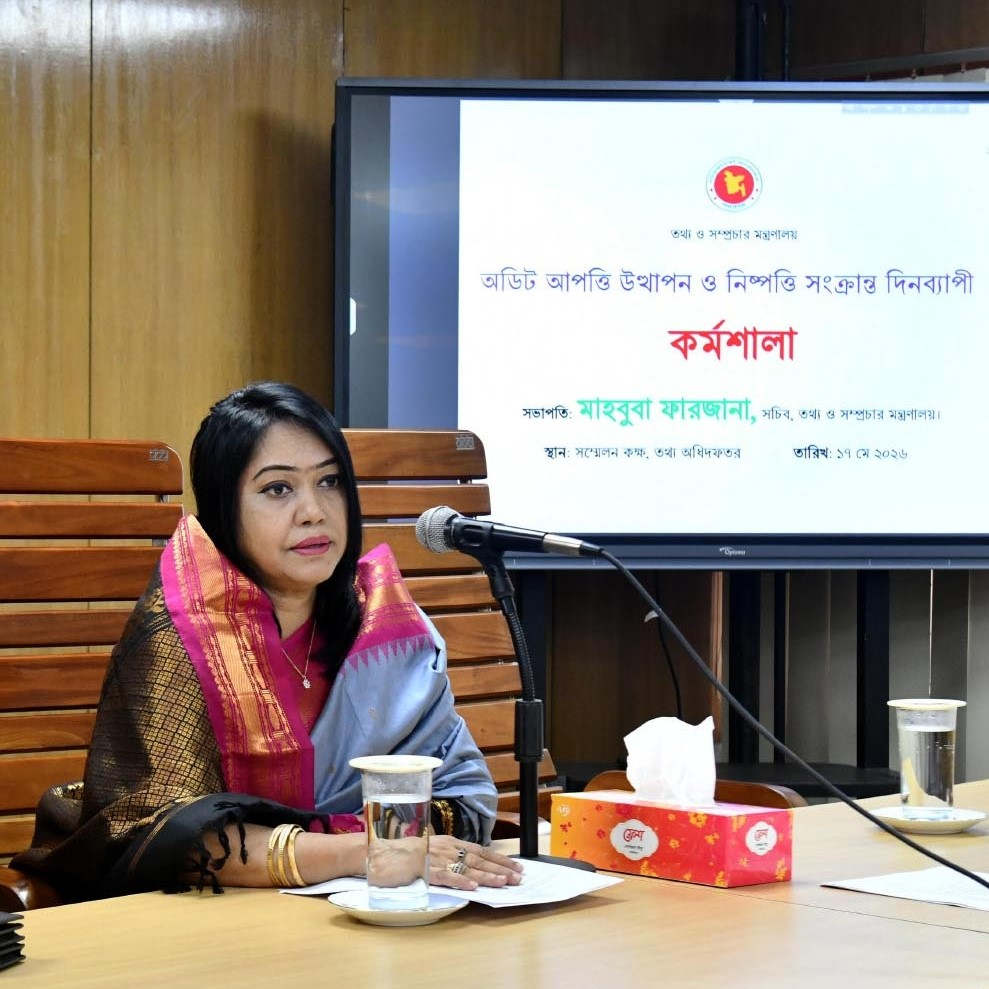
- Mahbuba Farzana, Secretary of the Ministry of Information and Broadcasting, Government of Bangladesh, addresses an audit workshop at the Secretariat on 17 May 2026.
- Born: Haluaghat Upazila, Mymensingh, Bangladesh
- Citizenship: Bangladeshi
- Education: University of Dhaka
- Occupation: Career Bureaucrat
- Years active: 1994–present
- Employer(s): Ministry of Information and Broadcasting, Bangladesh
- Office: Secretary
- Spouse: Professor Dr. Nazmul Amin
- Father: Md. Shamsul Islam Siddique
- Website: Ministry of Information and Broadcasting, Bangladesh – Official profile

Mahbuba Farzana is the secretary of the Ministry of Information and Broadcasting of Bangladesh. She previously worked for the Skills for Employment Investment Program, which was financed by the Asian Development Bank.

== Career ==
Mahbuba Farzana was born in Panchayet Bari, Swadeshi village, Swadeshi Union No. 12, Haluaghat Upazila, Mymensingh. She is the daughter of the late Md. Shamsul Islam Siddique, a former Deputy Director of the Bangladesh Water Development Board, and the granddaughter of the late Nabi Hossain Siddique. After completing her higher secondary education, she enrolled in the Department of English at the University of Dhaka, where she obtained her bachelor's and master's degrees. She also obtained a postgraduate degree in Public Policy and Management.

Farzana joined the 13th batch of the Bangladesh Civil Service.

In 2023, Farzana was the gender and development specialist and joint secretary at the Skills For Employment Investment Program Project of the Finance Division of the Ministry of Finance.

Following the fall of the Sheikh Hasina led Awami League government, Farzana was appointed secretary of the Ministry of Information and Broadcasting in October 2024. She was serving as an Officer on Special Duty, rank of Additional Secretary, at the Ministry of Public Administration. She was promoted to secretary before her appointment. She defended the Media Reform Commission of the government and told the UNESCO and United Nations Development Programme that the government was not imposing the reforms. She chaired the closing ceremony of Youth Festival-2025.

== Personal life ==
Farzana is married to Professor Dr. Nazmul Amin, a member of the Bangladesh Civil Service (Administration) Cadre, as well as an author and researcher. He was also appointed as one of the four newly appointed members of the Bangladesh Public Service Commission (BPSC). They have one son.
