= Ferdous Ara Begum =

Bangladeshi economist

- ফেরদৌস আরা বেগম

Director General of Bangladesh Television

Personal details
- Education: University of Dhaka (BS, MS); Harvard University (MS)
- Occupation: Economist, gender specialist, government official

Ferdous Ara Begum is a Bangladeshi economist, gender specialist, and retired civil servant. She was a member of the UN Committee on the Elimination of Discrimination against Women and is an expert consultant on Gender Issues for the United Nations Population Fund. She was the first woman director-general of the state-owned Bangladesh Television. She is a former joint secretary of the Ministry of Women and Children Affairs.

== Early life ==
Begum completed her bachelor’s and master’s degrees in economics from the University of Dhaka. She later earned a Master of Public Administration from the Kennedy School of Government at Harvard University.

== Career ==
In 1994, Begum became the first woman commissioner of taxes in Bangladesh.

While serving as joint secretary of the Ministry of Women and Children Affairs (2002–2004), Begum played a pivotal role in 34 gender-specific projects aimed at enhancing the social and legal protection of women and children, particularly in rural Bangladesh. She worked on the initiatives to implement the Committee on the Elimination of Discrimination against Women's concluding observations in Bangladesh. She was posted at the Economic Relations Division, but the Ministry of Finance refused to accept her.

In 2005, Begum became the first female director general of Bangladesh Television (BTV), the state-owned national television. She introduced Sesame Street to BTV.

Begum was awarded the Begum Rokeya Shining Personality Award in 2005 by Narikantha Foundation.

In April 2026, Begum was elected as the president of executive council of the Bangladesh Senior Citizens Forum for the term 2026-27.

== Personal life ==
Begum is married to Tajul Islam, advocate and former press secretary to the then Prime Minister Khaleda Zia. They both received promotions under the President's quota after the Bangladesh Nationalist Party came to power.
