= Kazi Jesin =

Bangladeshi poet, journalist and administrator

- কাজী জেসিন

Director General of Bangladesh Television
- Incumbent
- Assumed office 6 August 2026
- Prime Minister: Tarique Rahman
- Preceded by: Mahbubul Alam

Personal details
- Born: Gaibandha District
- Education: University of Cumbria (MS)

Kazi Jesin is a Bangladeshi journalist, poet and broadcaster. She was appointed as director general of Bangladesh Television on a contract basis on 6 August 2026. Prior to this, she worked as a journalist for multiple news outlets and television channels. Jesin was also the host of the Banglavision talk show Point of Order.

== Early life ==
She was born in Gaibandha District. She earned a master's degree in Sustainable Development and Leadership from University of Cumbria. She is also a fellow of International Visitor Leadership Program (IVLP) and completed a special fellowship in new media technology.

== Career ==
Jesin began her writing career in 1997 by publishing essays in little magazines. Later, she worked as a professional journalist for Daily Amar Desh, NTV, Channel One, ATN Bangla, Ekushey Television, Banglavision and Jamuna Television. she also writes regular columns and articles on current affairs for several national newspapers.

She is a fellow of International Visitor Leadership Program of United States and has completed a special fellowship on new media technology.

== Appointment as BTV director general ==
On 6 August 2026, Ministry of Public Administration appointed Jesin as the director general of Bangladesh Television. Under the terms of the appointment, she had to leave any other professional, business or employment positions. She succeeded Md. Mahbubul Alam in the role.

== Published book ==
- Moonlit Journey (জোৎস্নামত্ত যাত্রা), 1997
- Tananum Tananum (তানানুম তানানুম), 2010
