= Fable:Time =

Studio album by Shama Rahman
- Released: 16 June 2013
- Recorded: 2011
- Genre: Folk; jazz; spoken word
- Length: 27:38
- Language: English; Bengali

Fable:Time is the debut studio album by British musician Shama Rahman, released on 16 June 2013.

== Composition ==
Recorded in 2011, Fable:Time features musicians from Bengal, Britain and around the world, it was recorded with support from Gabriel Prokofiev's Non-Classical studios and with production from Guildhall composer Christopher Bartholomew. There were also electronic/dubstep remixes from French dubstep producer Son of a Pitch. Her band also had accompaniment with live drawing, which was used in the album.

The dramatic and storytelling album combines influences from everywhere Rahman has lived, visited, experienced and loved in – at least three continents. Some of her spoken word pieces are featured in this album and has led her to perform at the DSC Literary Festival and Hackney Word Festival.

== Release ==
The album was released on 16 June 2013. Each song on the album unveils a chapter in an overall story about how time affects us - its illusions, deceptions and myths. The album mimics the non-linearity of time and is on a circular track listing. From this, she has visualised one overall narrative by creating a series of eight videos which are all episodes in a series. The first episode "Reflections" received critical acclaim from Gilles Peterson.

== Track listing ==
No.	Title	Length
1.	"Reflections"	4:11
2.	"26 Hour Baby"	4:25
3.	"Coast"	5:02
4.	"Bolte Paro Ki (Can You Tell Me Why?)"	4:08
5.	"Time"	6:08
6.	"Partial"	4:18
7.	"Warrior"	5:52
8.	"Jokhon"	3:34
Total length:		27:38
