= Jungle Mangal =

Bangladeshi 2D animation series

- Series poster
- Bengali: জঙ্গলে মঙ্গল
- Genre: Fiction; Thriller; Adventure
- Written by: Momin Biswas
- Directed by: Shafiq Pahari
- Country of origin: Bangladesh
- Original language: Bengali
- No. of seasons: 1
- No. of episodes: 13

Production
- Producer: Mahbooba Ferdous
- Editors: Iqbal Munna; Asha Zahid
- Running time: 20-22 minutes
- Production company: Double Click Animation

Original release
- Network: Bangladesh Television
- Release: 1 October – 31 December 2022

Jungle Mangal (Bengali: জঙ্গলে মঙ্গল) is a Bangladeshi 2D animation series produced by Double Click Animation. It was aired on the state-owned Bangladesh Television in 2022. This is the first animated series fully produced in Bangladesh.

== Plot ==
Jungle Mangal has been developed in the context of a mysterious story. The story is based on the perspective of a group of children and teenagers solving great problems in an intellectual way.

== Production ==
Two-dimensional animation series Jungle Mangal was made for children and teenagers through digital technology. Local animators and crews have been coordinated to produce this animation series. This is the first full-length animation series to be aired in the country's television history. The series was directed by Shafiq Pahari and written by Momin Biswas. Produced by Mahbooba Ferdous, the animation series is produced by Double Click Animation. A group of youths from small ethnic groups worked to make this animation. The project is coordinated by Iqbal Munna and Asha Zahid, former US State Department researcher.

== Release ==
The broadcast of the series was started from October 1, 2022. It was aired every Saturday at 10.35 am and re-broadcast the next day at 5.35 pm. The last episode was broadcast on December 31, 2022. The series was succeeded by another animation series Gittu Bittur Obhijan.

== See also ==
- Television in Bangladesh
