= BBC Janala: Mojay Mojay Shekha =

- Kamal Bayazid, Rumana Malik Munmun and Alexandra Tyers
- Genre: Educational game show
- Written by: Louise Clover
- Directed by: Reza Ghalib; Sameer Ahmed; Don Coutts; Louise Clover; Jannatul Ferdoush Peya
- Presented by: Rumana Malik
- Starring: Kamal Bayazid; Alexandra Tyers; Suzana Ansar; Farzana Dua Elahe; Khairul Islam Pakhi; Jannatul Ferdoush Peya
- Country of origin: Bangladesh
- Original languages: Bengali; English
- No. of series: 2
- No. of episodes: 40

Production
- Producers: Mary Hare; Michelle Ross-Stanton
- Production location: Bangladesh
- Editors: Sagar Sarwar Hossain; Bashar Georgis
- Running time: 25 minutes
- Production companies: BBC World Service Trust (2010); BBC Media Action (2012)

Original release
- Network: Bangladesh Television
- Release: 16 October 2010 – 7 June 2012

Related
- Bishaash

BBC Janala: Mojay Mojay Shekha (Bengali: বিবিসি জানালা মজায় মজায় শেখা; English: BBC Window Learning with Fun) is a Bangladeshi prime-time educational game show with comedy sketches for English learning. The show was produced by the BBC and aired over two series on Bangladesh Television from 16 October 2010 to 7 June 2012.

== Overview ==
BBC Janala Mojay Mojay Shekha is an educational game show teaching English that seeks to motivate audiences to learn English through fun. The game show has a partner programme Bishaash, a supernatural detective drama series.

The game show is hosted by Rumana Malik Munmun. In series two, "Raisa in Bangladesh" features Farzana Dua Elahe and Suzana Ansar as they visit their family and business interests around Bangladesh.

The 24-part first series was aimed at a young audience. There were techniques, including role-playing, where contestants converse in English. The 16-part second series had a different appearance, style, and pace.

== Cast ==
- Rumana Malik Munmun as Munmun
- Kamal Bayazid as Kamal
- Alexandra Tyers as Alex
- Suzana Ansar as Suzanne
- Farzana Dua Elahe as Raisa
- Jannatul Ferdoush Peya
- Khairul Islam Pakhi as Sultan

== Series overview ==
Series	Episodes	Originally released	
Series	Episodes	First released	Last released
1	24	16 October 2010	18 March 2011
2	16	10 March 2012	7 June 2012

== Broadcast ==
BBC Janala Mojay Mojay Shekha was broadcast on Bangladesh Television and Bangladesh Television World from 16 October 2010. It was preceded back-to-back with an episode of Bishaash and reached audiences of 18.1 million.

The game show returned for a 16-part second series on 10 March 2012.

The popularity of the game show led to a rebroadcast of the series.

== See also ==
- British Bangladeshi
