= Directorate of Mass Communication =

Bangladeshi governmental department

Department of Mass Communication
- গণযোগাযোগ অধিদপ্তর
- Formation: 1972
- Headquarters: Dhaka, Bangladesh
- Region served: Bangladesh
- Official language: Bengali; English
- Director General: Faizul Haque
- Main organ: Ministry of Information and Broadcasting
- Website: masscommunication.gov.bd

Department of Mass Communication is a government department under the Ministry of Information and Broadcasting in Bangladesh. Its headquarter is located in Dhaka, It has 68 field level offices all over the country. Among those 64 District Information Offices are located in 64 district headquarters and 4 offices are located in 4 Upzilas of hill tracts region.

== History ==
Department of Mass Communication traces its origin to an organization that existed under the Information Department of the British Raj in 1924. It was located in the writers buildings in Kolkata. After the Partition of India the government of Pakistan created the Public Relations Directorate under the Information Ministry. It was responsible for the management of the Government Television and Radio services.

On 2 October 1972, following the Independence of Bangladesh, the government of Bangladesh created the Department of Mass Communication. It has created though combining Bangladesh Parishad, Public Relations Directorate, and the Bureau of National Reconstruction and Women's Wing. In 1983 it was reorganized by the Enam committee. The department is responsible for the management of information offices in all 68 districts of Bangladesh.
