= Bangladesh Journalists Welfare Trust =

Government-Owned Trust in Bangladesh

- Formation: 2014
- Headquarters: Dhaka, Bangladesh
- Region served: Bangladesh
- Official language: Bengali
- Website: www.bjwt.gov.bd

The Bangladesh Journalists Welfare Trust (Bengali: বাংলাদেশ সাংবাদিক কল্যাণ ট্রাস্ট) is a trust owned by the Government of Bangladesh, that is responsible for the welfare of journalists in Bangladesh. The Minister of Information chairs the trustee board of the trust.

== History ==
The Cabinet of Bangladesh approved the bill to form the trust on 4 November 2013. The Parliament of Bangladesh passed on 1 July 2014. The Bangladesh Journalists Welfare Trust was established in 2014 with an initial fund of 50 million taka from Prime Minister Sheikh Hasina. Private media houses donated further funds.

On 4 September 2016, Iqbal Sobhan Chowdhury, Media Affairs Adviser to the Prime Minister of Bangladesh, handed over checks to 27 journalists from the trust at Chittagong Press Club.

On 12 October 2018, Prime Minister Sheikh Hasina allocated 200 million taka for the fund.

Prime Minister Sheikh Hasina distributed to sick journalists and families of deceased journalists in a ceremony on 7 November 2019.

On 27 April 2021, Prime Minister of Bangladesh, Sheikh Hasina allocated 100 million taka to the trust to provide support to journalists during the COVID-19 pandemic in Bangladesh.
