= Cabinet Committee on Government Purchase =

Bangladeshi public procurement body

Cabinet Committee on Public Purchase
- Formation: 1972
- Headquarters: Dhaka, Bangladesh
- Region served: Bangladesh
- Official language: Bengali

The Cabinet Committee on Public Purchase (Bengali: সরকারী ক্রয় সংক্রান্ত মন্ত্রিসভা কমিটি) is the Bangladesh government's highest decision-making body regarding public procurement.

== History ==
The Cabinet Committee on Public Purchase is chaired by the Minister of Finance. The committee was established in January 2019 headed by the finance minister. This voided the previous committee and effectively replaced it. The finance minister also heads the Cabinet Committee on Economic Affairs.

On 25 November 2020, the Cabinet Committee on Public Purchase approved the procurement of 3.5 billion taka of fuel. On 3 December 2020 during the COVID-19 pandemic in Bangladesh, the Cabinet Committee on Public Purchase approved the procurement of COVID-19 vaccine from Serum Institute of India and Beximco Pharmaceuticals. On 6 January 2021, the committee approved the purchase of 250 thousand metric ton of rice, of which 100 thousand ton of rice would be imported from India.
