= BBC Media Action =

BBC's charity organization

- Founded: 1999
- Registration no.: England & Wales (1076235)
- Location: BBC Broadcasting House, London, W1A 1AA UK
- Origins: London, England (UK)
- Region served: Worldwide
- Executive Director: Simon Bishop
- Revenue: £45.3 million (2015/6)
- Expenses: £44 million (2015/6)
- Employees: 832
- Website: www.bbc.co.uk/mediaaction
- Formerly called: BBC World Service Trust

BBC Media Action, formerly known as the BBC World Service Trust, is the BBC's international development charity, funded independently by external grants and voluntary contributions. The purpose of the organisation is to use media and communication to reduce poverty, improve health and support people in understanding their rights. It works in partnership with the BBC World Service and other local media and development partners in over 35 developing and transitional countries around the world.

== History ==
The charity was founded in 1999 and grew out of earlier BBC initiatives, including a charity called 'Marshall Plan of the Mind'. This was set up to encourage "high standards of journalism" in the former Soviet Union and Eastern Europe in the 1990s.

In December 2011 the name was changed to BBC Media Action.

In 2011 there was controversy in America over the American government's discussion of funding the BBC World Service Trust to combat censorship in China and censorship in Iran using anti-jamming technology.

In 2025 there was controversy in America over the American government's funding the BBC Media Action, which was portrayed as funding the BBC.

== Funding ==
The charity is funded by external grants and voluntary contributions and works with many media, non-governmental, academic and donor organisations around the world. In November 2011, the UK government's Department for International Development (DFID) announced a five-year grant of £90 million to the charity.

In the 2015/2016 financial year the DFID grant was £14.7 million, compared to total income of £45.3 million and an expenditure of £44 million, employing an average of 832 full-time equivalent staff. The DFID grant ends on 31 March 2017.

Its main source of income is from institutions. In 2024, it listed the Foreign, Commonwealth and Development Office, the United States Agency for International Development and the Swedish International Development Cooperation Agency as its main donors.

== Recognition ==
In 2010 the charity won a Tech Award for developing a mobile phone service for teaching English to people in Bangladesh. The same project, BBC Janala, also received a GSMA Award for education technology at the Mobile World Congress in February 2011 and a World Innovation Summit for Education (WISE) award in November 2011 in recognition of their innovative approach and positive impact on education.

In 2013, the charity's mHealth product in Bihar, India - Mobile Academy and Mobile Kunji - won an mBillionth award in the Woman & Children category and a Vodafone Mobile for Good Award.

== See also ==
- BBC Janala
- Behavior change (public health)
