= Bishaash =

Bangladeshi supernatural drama television series

- Promotional poster
- Genre: Supernatural drama, adventure, fantasy, detective, mystery
- Written by: Ilora Choudhury; Selim Gias Uddin; Jo Ho; Farhana Islam; Waris Islam; Aditya Kabir; Rayhan Rahman; Ben Teasdale
- Directed by: Waris Islam; Sameer Ahmed; Indra Bhose; Selim Gias Uddin
- Starring: Rahmat Ali; Shama Rahman; Babu Md. Shaidul Islam Molla; Arabi Rahman
- Narrated by: Asaduzzaman Noor
- Theme music composer: Stephen Murphy & Sayeem Hasan
- Composers: Christian Vassie & Stephen Murphy
- Country of origin: Bangladesh
- Original languages: Bengali; English
- No. of series: 1
- No. of episodes: 24 (list of episodes)

Production
- Producers: Mary Hare; Rishi Sankar
- Production locations: Dhaka, Bangladesh; London, United Kingdom
- Cinematography: Roger Bonnici; Rashed Zaman; Sheikh Rajibul Islam
- Editors: Iqbal Kabir Joel; Donny Boocock; Georgis Bashar
- Running time: 25 minutes
- Production company: BBC World Service Trust

Original release
- Network: Bangladesh Television
- Release: 6 March – 18 March 2011

Related
- BBC Janala Mojay Mojay Shekha

Bishaash (Bengali: বিশ্বাস; Belief) is a Bangladeshi supernatural television series produced by BBC World Service Trust which was first broadcast on Bangladesh Television from 16 October 2010 to 18 March 2011.

The series stars Shama Rahman, Sayed Babu, Arabi Rahman and Rahmat Ali. It is about a British-Bangladeshi woman named Zara who relocates to Bangladesh after inheriting a stake in a mysterious supernatural detective agency in Dhaka.

== Plot summary ==
Zara Rahman (Shama Rahman), a young, head-strong and inquisitive woman discovers that she has inherited co-ownership of an antique shop in Dhaka after the death of her grandfather. When she moves to Bangladesh she learns that the shop also houses a supernatural detective agency. She meets young supernatural investigator Abir Zaman (Sayed Babu), his uncle Ferdous Zaman (Rahmat Ali) and his cousin sister Laboni (Arabi Rahman) and is thrown into his world of supernatural mystery, magic and adventure. The story progresses with various twists and events relating to the Zaman Family and ends with a huge unexpected twist and the darkest secret of the Zaman Family.

== Overview ==
Bishaash is south Asia's first supernatural detective series. and the first serial drama shot between Bangladesh and London, England. There are 24 paired episodes, each lasting 25 minutes.

The series features dialogue in Bengali and English. Initially, the dialogue in the series is in Bangla with English subtitles. However, episode by episode, more and more English dialogue is introduced.

The series was part of Mott MacDonald's £50 million nine-year programme since 2007 aimed at teaching many of the poorest people in Bangladesh what project director John Shotton describes as "vocational English". One of their project partners is broadcaster BBC World Service. The series was made by the BBC World Service Trust.

The programme was an initiative of English in Action, funded by the Department for International Development. by 2017.

The storylines have a supernatural twist which includes themes of family tradition, love, evil, and danger.

== Production ==
Writers, directors and producers were recruited from the UK. Production staff includes staff from the UK as well as Bangladesh. Location manager Charlie Thompson recruited a local team from the domestic industry with basic industry experience or basic skill sets in the right areas and trained them to meet the required standards, broaden their skill bases and enable them to use them in the international arena. Half a dozen locals went through a formal training programme organised by Thompson that included seminars and on-the-job learning.

Bishaash is set in Dhaka, Bangladesh and Brick Lane, London. It was filmed in a variety of locations in and around Dhaka and a village was built in the forest region of Gazipur. It was shot on XDCAM and was edited in Bangladesh using Final Cut Pro.

== Cast and characters ==
=== Main ===
- Rahmat Ali as Ferdous Zaman: Antique shop co-owner, and Abir and Laboni's uncle.
- Shama Rahman as Zara Rahman: Head-strong, inquisitive woman who relocates to Bangladesh when she inherits a stake in a detective agency.
- Arabi Rahman as Laboni Zaman: Technology and research expert, and Abir's cousin.

=== Recurring ===
- Ahmed Rubel as Abdul Ali, who is after the Keystone Journal and intent on getting revenge on the Zamans.
- Humayun Faridi as Kabir Zaman: Antique shop co-owner, Abir's father, Ferdous' elder brother.
- Shatabdi Wadud as Pishach/ Sherzad / Alien / Announcer / Drug Dealer
- Mirana Zaman as Dadi (Grandmother): The matriarch of the Zaman family.

=== Guest ===
- Jayanta Chattopadhyay as Dhormoraj: the chief of a tribe.
- Fazlur Rahman Babu as Kimbu
- Raisul Islam Asad as Nuruddin
- Shimul Yousuf as Rokeya
- A.T.M. Shamsuzzaman as Rustom
- Utsha Zaman as Baroon
- Reetu Abdus Sattar as Srabonti
- Shyamol Mawla as Adnan
- Rumana Malik Munmun
- Bijori Barkatullah as Meher
- Shahed Ali as the mirror owner

== Series overview ==
Series	Episodes	Originally released	
Series	Episodes	First released	Last released
1	24	16 October 2010	18 March 2011

== Episodes ==
No.	Title	Original release date
1	"Treasure: Part 1"	15 October 2010
2	"Treasure: Part 2"	15 October 2010
3	"Treasure: Part 3"	22 October 2010
4	"Heartland: Part 1"	29 October 2010
5	"Heartland: Part 2"	5 November 2010
6	"Love Never Dies"	12 November 2010
7	"Love Never Dies: Part 2"	19 November 2010
8	"Twilight: Part 1"	26 November 2010
9	"Twilight Part 2"	3 December 2010
10	"In/Compatible: Part 1"	10 December 2010
11	"In/Compatible: Part 2"	17 December 2010
12	"Antique Shop"	24 December 2010
13	"London Calling: Part 1"	31 December 2010
14	"London Calling: Part 2"	8 January 2011
15	"Janmo Janmantor: Part 1"	15 January 2011
16	"Janmo Janmantor: Part 2"	22 January 2011
17	"Over and Over Again: Part 1"	29 January 2011
18	"Over and Over Again: Part 2"	4 February 2011
19	"Out of Control"	11 February 2011
20	"Lies I Need to Believe"	18 February 2011
21	"Revelations"	26 February 2011
22	"The Choice"	4 March 2011
23	"Family: Part 1"	12 March 2011
24	"Family: Part 2"	18 March 2011

== Broadcast ==
Zee Café promotional poster

Bishaash was broadcast weekly on Bangladesh Television and Bangladesh Television World from 16 October 2010. It was followed back-to-back with an episode of BBC Janala Mojay Mojay Shekha. and reached audiences of 20.3 million.

The series was provided without charge to Zee TV and was aired weekly from 6 March 2011 on Zee Network's Zee Café. The popularity of the series led to a rebroadcast.

== See also ==
- British Bangladeshi
