= Bangladesh Film Archive =

Institution in Bangladesh

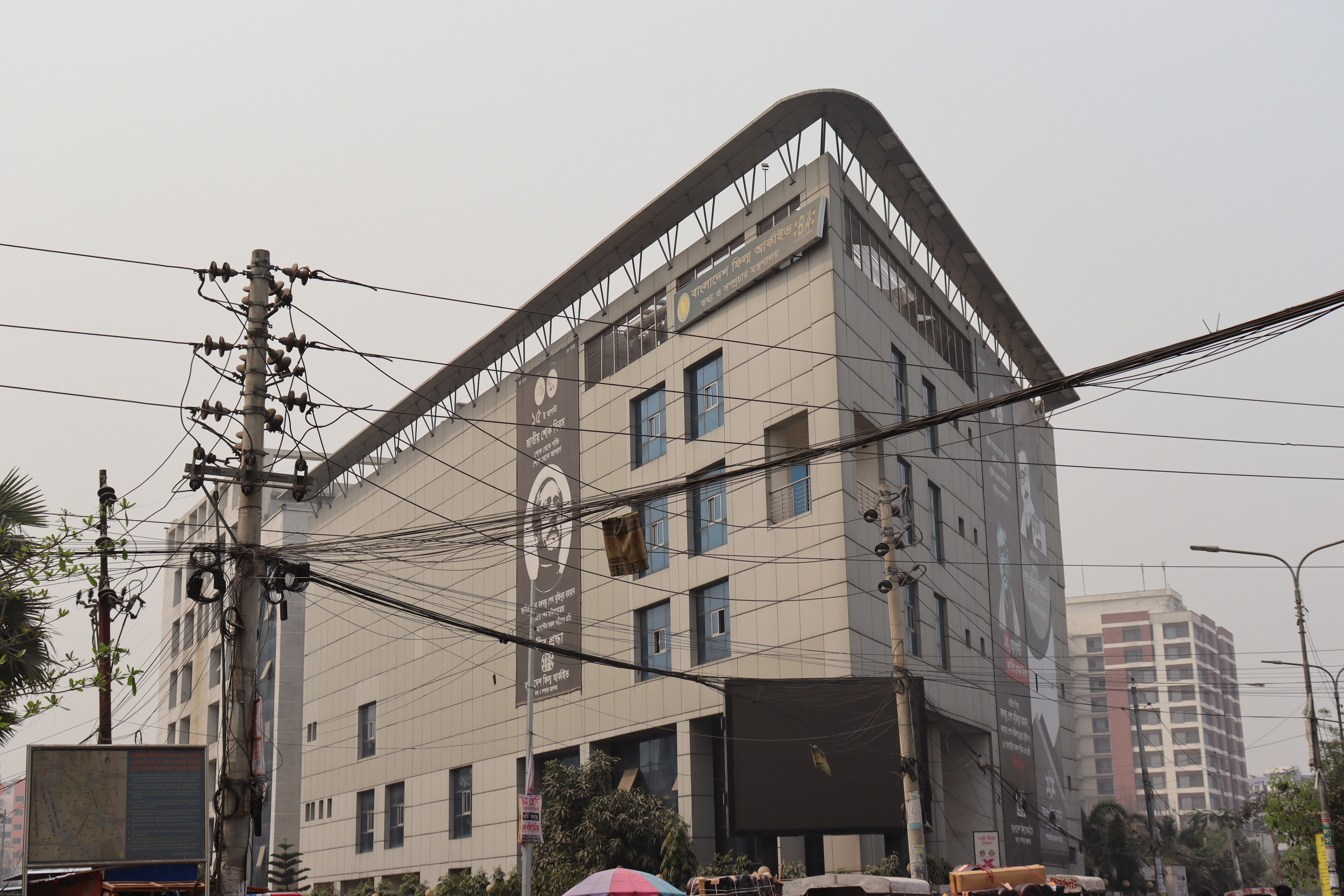
- Formation: 1978
- Headquarters: Dhaka, Bangladesh
- Region served: Bangladesh
- Official language: Bengali
- Website: bfa.gov.bd

Bangladesh Film Archive is an independent institution that is the national film archive of Bangladesh and preserves films, commercials and other visual medias produced in Bangladesh. It is located in Agargaon, Dhaka, Bangladesh.

== History ==
The archive was established in 1978 by the then government of Bangladesh. In 1984, it was made an independent institution. In 2016, the archive donated Pramathesh Barua's 'Devdas' original print to India.

== Gallery ==
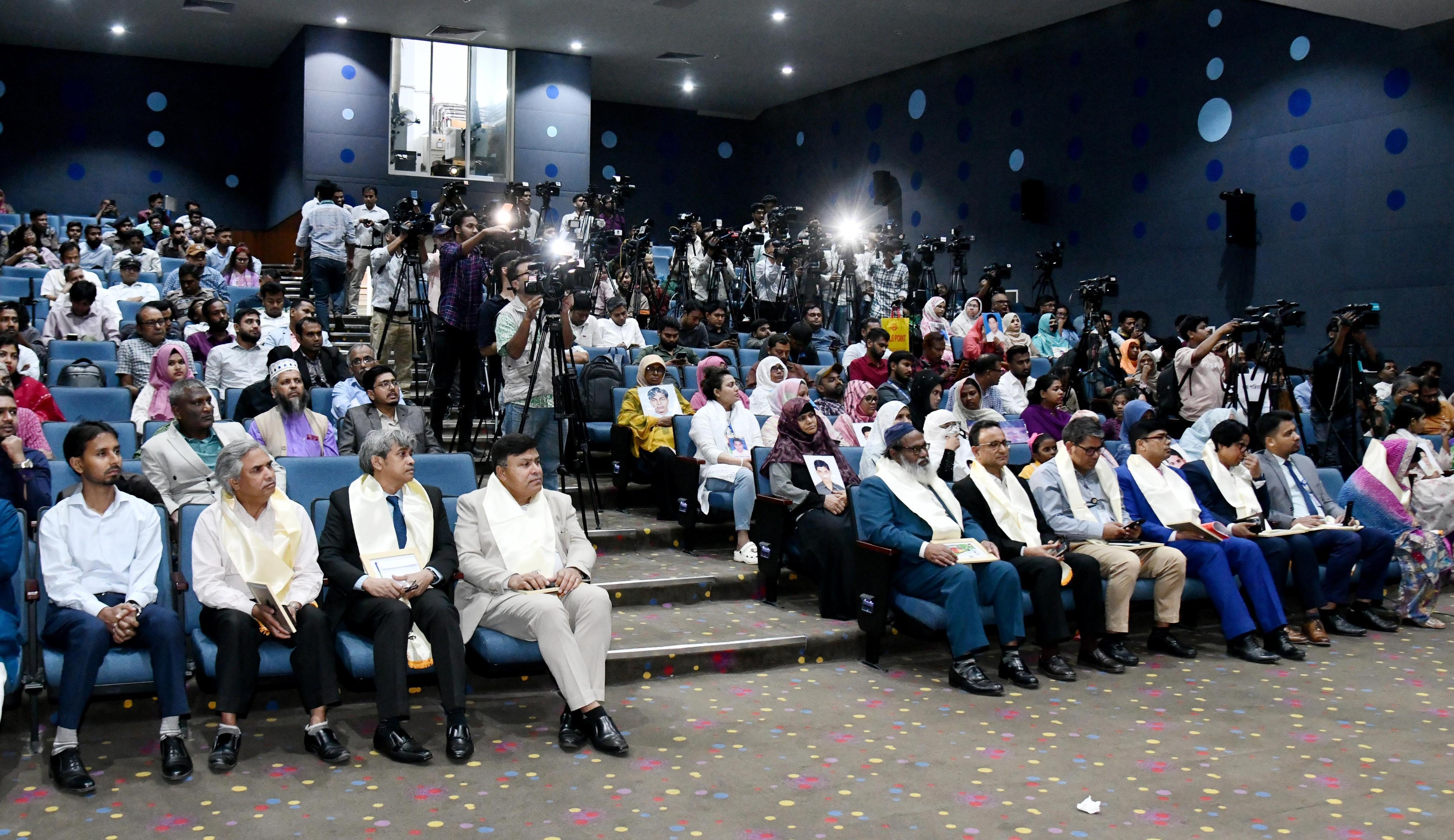
Bangladesh Film Achieve Theater at inauguration of film 'Mayer Daak'

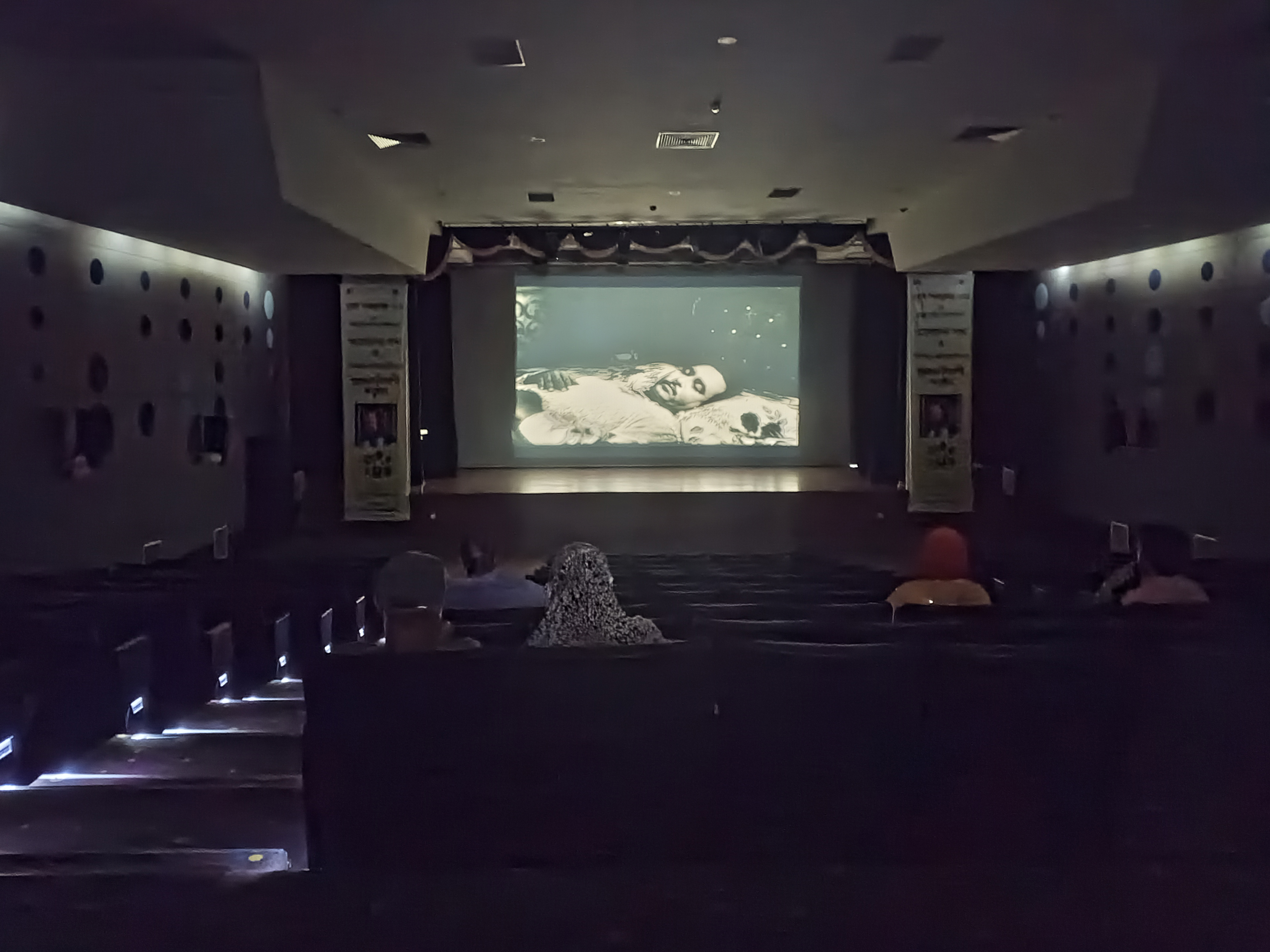
Theatre during weekly old film exhibition showing Saat Bhai Champa (1968)

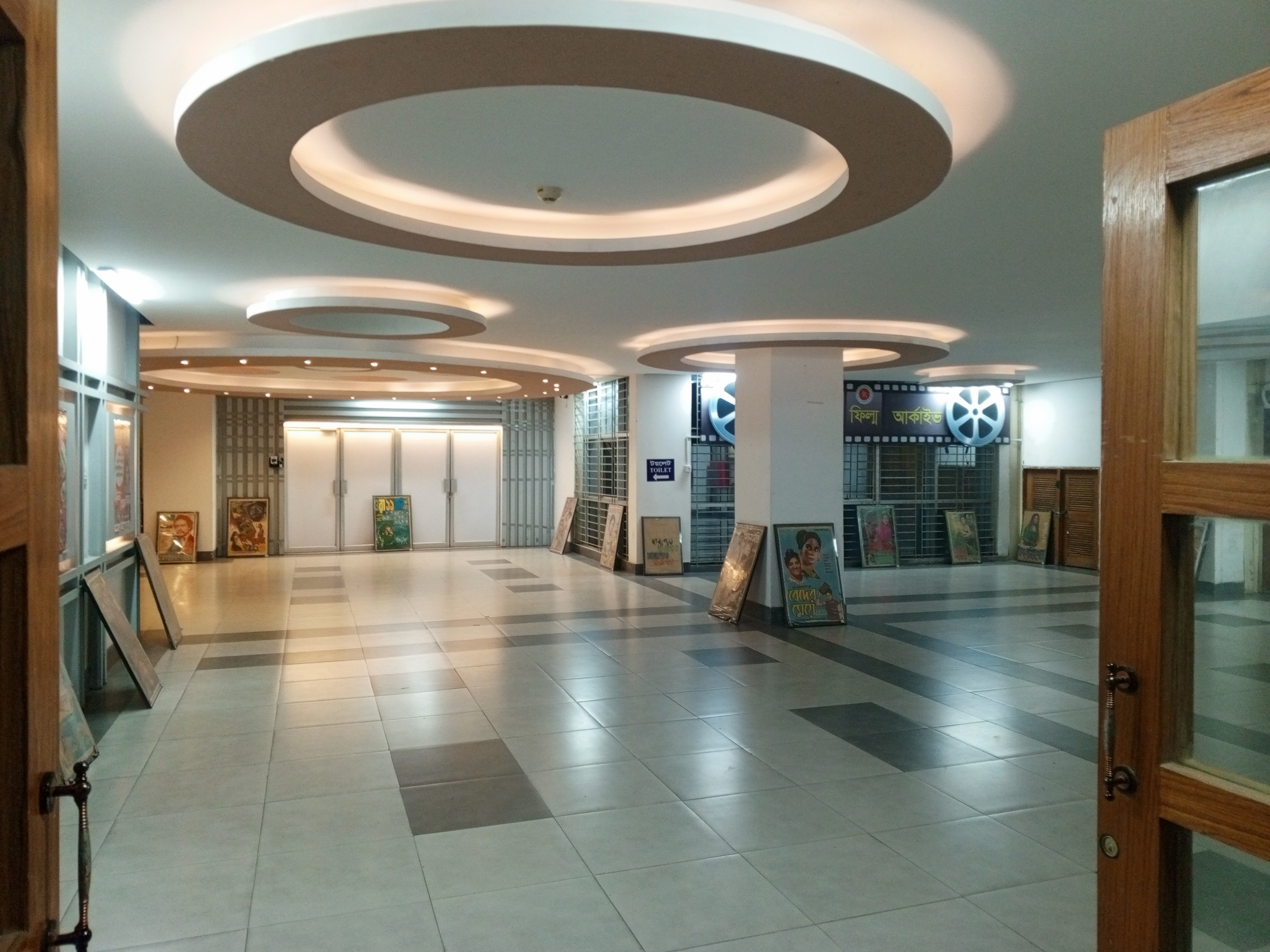
Theatre lobby
