= Bangladesh Television =

State-owned television network of Bangladesh

Bangladesh Television; বাংলাদেশ টেলিভিশন
- Logo of BTV

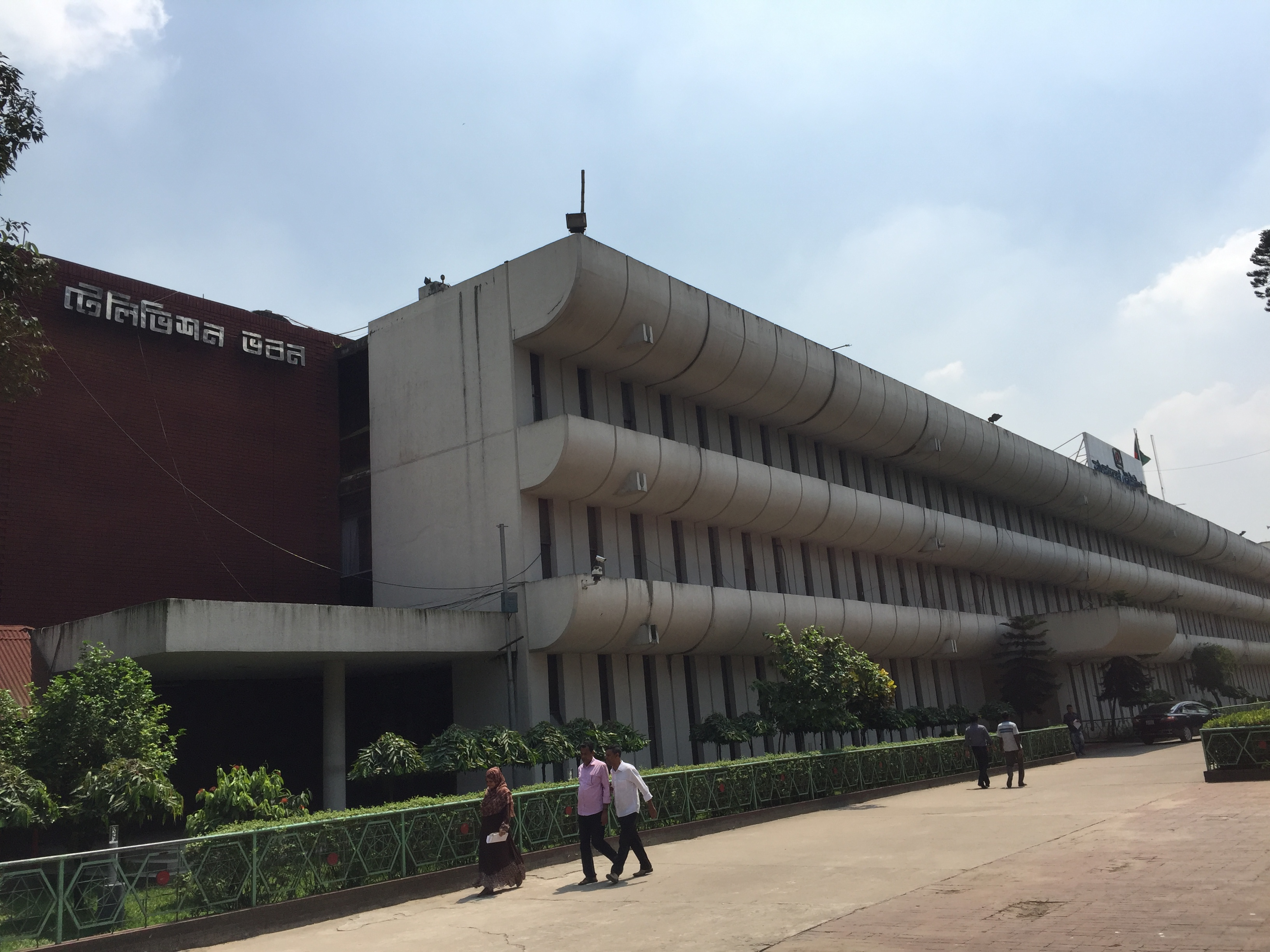
- The headquarters of Bangladesh Television in Rampura, built in 1975. Often known as the BTV Bhaban.
- Type: Broadcast; Satellite television; Internet
- Branding: BTV
- Country: Bangladesh
- First air date: 25 December 1964; 61 years ago
- Availability: Nationwide; Worldwide
- Founded: 1964; 62 years ago by Government of Pakistan
- TV stations: 16 (including 14 relays)
- Headquarters: Rampura, Dhaka
- Owner: Government of Bangladesh
- Key people: Kazi Jesin (director general)
- Established: 25 December 1964; 61 years ago (as Pilot Television Dacca); 16 December 1971; 54 years ago (as Bangladesh Television)
- Picture format: 1080i HDTV (downscaled to 16:9 576i for SDTV sets)
- Official website: btv.gov.bd
- Language: Bengali

Bangladesh Television (Bengali: বাংলাদেশ টেলিভিশন), commonly known by its acronym BTV (Bengali: বিটিভি), is the state-owned television network of Bangladesh. The network was originally established as the East Pakistan branch of Pakistan Television in 1964. It was rebranded right after the independence of Bangladesh. BTV is the oldest Bengali-language television network in the world, as well as the oldest television network in Bangladesh, and is sister to the radio broadcaster Bangladesh Betar, which, along with BTV, are both owned and operated by the government.

Bangladesh Television is the country's only television network provided on terrestrial television. It is primarily financed through television licence fees. Although it has produced many award-winning programs, it has often been accused of being the mouthpiece of the government and panned for its lack of quality programming. Both the headquarters and the administrative building of Bangladesh Television are located at Rampura in Dhaka.

Bangladesh Television's administrative building

Prior to the late 1990s, Bangladesh Television was the sole television broadcaster provided in Bangladesh. It was a very successful network in terms of viewership until the launch of several satellite television channels, which led to the network's downfall and stagnation, mostly because it was used for spewing government propaganda for a long period of time. Reporters Without Borders dubbed Bangladesh Television, along with Bangladesh Betar, as a "government propaganda outlet".

Bangladesh Television operates two main television stations, BTV Dhaka and BTV Chittagong, and fourteen relay stations all over Bangladesh. The network also has one specialized television channel, BTV News. It is a member of the Asia-Pacific Broadcasting Union and Asiavision, and is an associate member of the European Broadcasting Union. Bangladesh Television also plans to launch six more television channels. The network formerly had an international television channel, BTV World, which was launched in 2004. BTV can be received via satellite throughout Asia and parts of Europe and Africa. Bangladesh Television is also the sister network of Sangsad Television, a parliamentary television channel. BTV Dhaka broadcasts eighteen hours a day on terrestrial television, and twenty-four hours a day on satellite television. BTV Chittagong broadcasts on a full-day basis daily.

== History ==
=== 1964–1971: Pakistan Television era ===
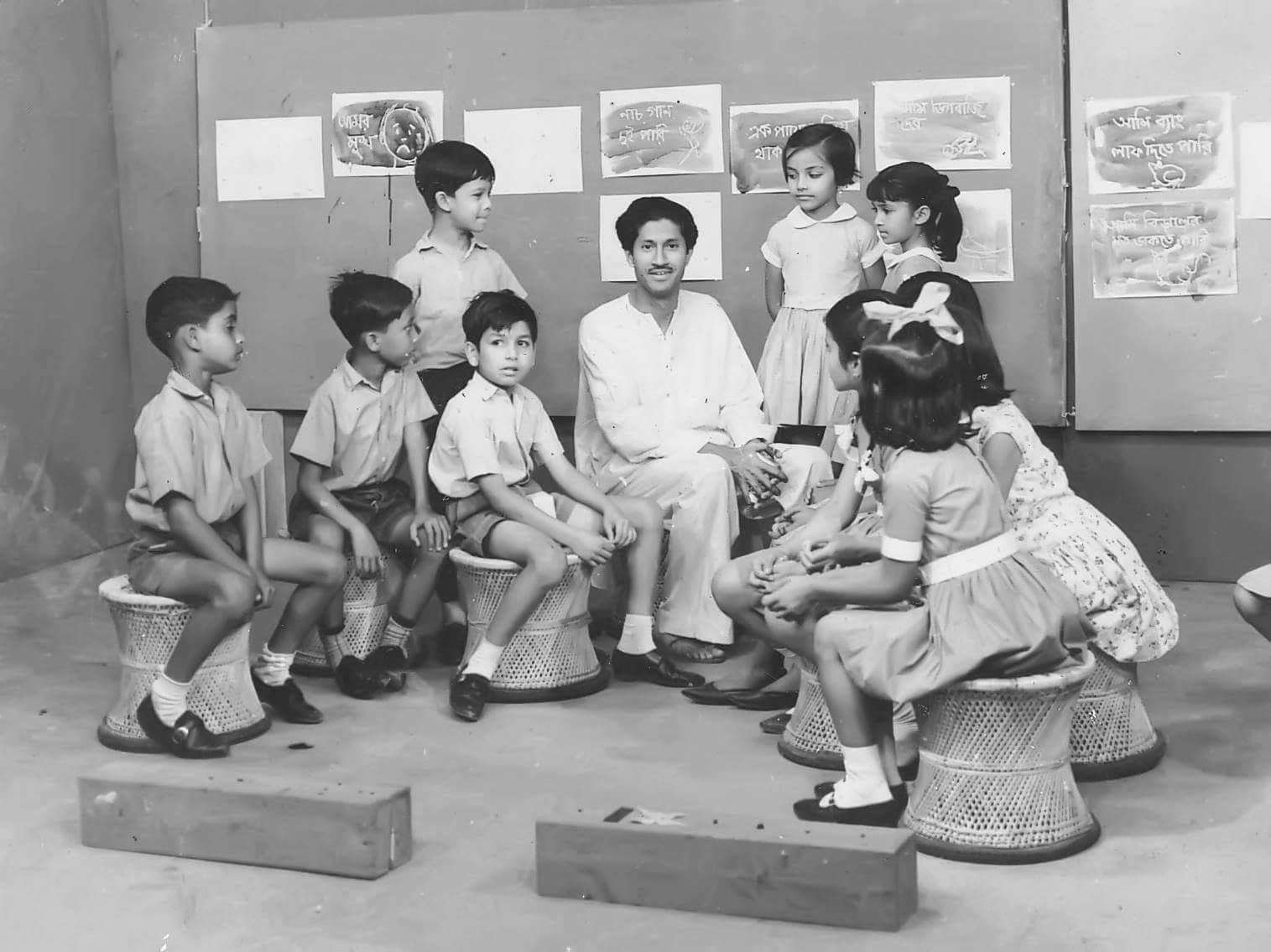
Mustafa Monwar at PTV's Dhaka studios; 1964

BTV first commenced transmissions on 25 December 1964 at 19:00 (Dhaka Standard Time), as a pilot project in the then East Pakistan under the name Pilot Television Dacca, airing a song titled "Oi Je Akash Nil Holo Aaj/Shei Shudhu Tomar Preme", sung by singer Ferdausi Rahman. Mordecai Cohen was the first announcer on BTV. One of the first broadcasts on the station was also the announcement, "Accept our best wishes, pilot television, Dhaka, 10 Poush 1371", using the Bengali calendar date rather than the Gregorian one. It broadcast from the DIT Bhaban on a three- to four-hour basis, with broadcasting equipment provided by NEC. It was originally supposed to be launched on 1 October.

After three months on the air, it was officially converted into a service of Pakistan Television on 25 March 1965. It only broadcast six days a week, while being closed on Mondays. This was Pakistan Television's second television station after the one in Lahore. The first drama telecast on PTV's Dacca television station, Ektala Dotala, written by Munier Choudhury, was aired in 1965. The reality television series Notun Kuri premiered on the station in 1966. It was later taken off the air, although the series would return to the air in 1976. The first television commercial on PTV Dacca was aired in 1967 for a detergent soap 707. The same year, Pakistan Television's eastern branch was converted to an autonomous corporation. The station initially broadcast on VHF channel 9, but moved to channel 6 and increased its signal on 27 October 1968. There were also plans to establish relay stations in Khulna, Rajshahi, and Chittagong.

On 4 March 1971, the Dacca station of Pakistan Television was unofficially renamed "Dacca Television", and television celebrities refused to work for Pakistani television as the East Pakistanis struggled for autonomy. On 23 March 1971, three days before Bangladesh was declared an independent state, Dacca Television began displaying the flag of Bangladesh and playing the Bangladeshi national anthem, Amar Sonar Bangla, rather than the Pakistani flag and national anthem, despite special programming being arranged on the occasion of Pakistan Day.

Threats were made by Pakistani authorities that if the flag of Pakistan was not displayed on television, then Bengali workers would be barred from entering the television center. However, pro-Bangladesh songs were aired on Dacca Television on the night of 23 March instead. Dacca Television later signed off the next day at 00:01 following an announcement by Masuma Khatun. No programming was broadcast on that day in order to protest Pakistani intervention. As a result, the Pakistan Armed Forces took control of the DIT Bhaban on 26 March but was attacked by the Mukti Bahini. At that moment, people joined to fight for the independence of East Pakistan through its television industry.

=== 1971–1997: Independence and government monopoly ===
One of the earliest known broadcasts of Bangladesh Television.

After the independence of Bangladesh in 1971, Pakistan Television's Dacca television station was renamed Bangladesh Television Corporation Dacca, officially losing its affiliation with PTV. Bangladesh Television's logo appeared on the television screen for the first time on 17 December 1971. Major A.T.M. Haider announced the victory of Bangladesh in the separation war on Bangladesh Television on the same day during the afternoon. Official broadcasts using the name also began that day at 19:00 (BST).

Jamil Chowdhury was the first director general of Bangladesh Television. A signature tune for the station was later made, being based on Dhana Dhanya Pushpa Bhara, a patriotic song written by Bengali poet Dwijendralal Ray. The next year, the autonomous corporation was converted into a fully government-owned department on 15 September, being renamed again as Bangladesh Television Dacca, known just as Bangladesh Television or BTV. The network established its first television station outside Dhaka in Natore in 1974.

On 9 February 1975, the offices and studios were shifted to the newly built headquarters located at Rampura in Dacca with newer technology. Operations from the Rampura headquarters building commenced on 6 March of that year. The then president of Bangladesh, Sheikh Mujibur Rahman, visited the new headquarters building on 18 May 1975. A while following the assassination of Sheikh Mujibur Rahman, four BTV officials, including one of the founders of the network and then deputy general director, Monirul Alam, were killed on 7 November 1975. By 1975, BTV increased its broadcasting schedule to four hours daily. At the time, the transmissions of BTV Dacca covered areas around Comilla, Faridpur, Mymensingh, and Tangail besides Dacca. It increased its broadcasting schedule again to five and a half hours daily the following year.

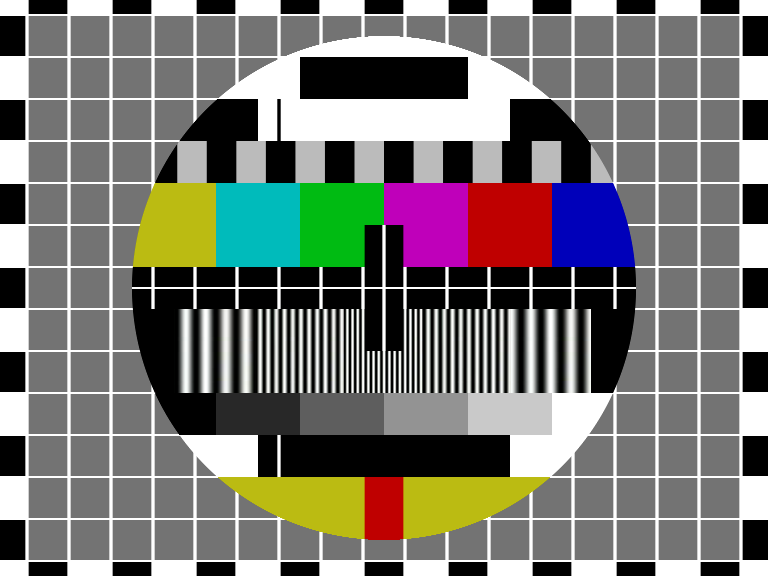
The Philips PM5534 test pattern used by Bangladesh Television. The station identification in Bengali was inscribed at the bottom.

In 1977, Fazle Lohani created a new magazine show for BTV based on The David Frost Show, Jodi Kichhu Mone Na Koren (Note: Bengali: যদি কিছু মনে না করেন, meaning If you don't mind anything), which ended right after his death. It later expanded its broadcasting schedule to six hours daily in 1979. Bangladesh Television commenced color transmissions on 1 December 1980, being inaugurated by President Ziaur Rahman, marking the first official full-time color broadcasts in South Asia. In 1984, Bangladesh Television merged with Bangladesh Betar to form the National Broadcasting Authority. As of 1986, BTV broadcast for 9 hours on weekdays and 14 hours on weekends, usually during the evenings. It also aired special programming on Fridays, as well as during national and religious holidays.

It began relaying broadcasts of CNN and BBC in 1992, marking the first presence of foreign television in Bangladesh. In 1994, BTV telecasted its first private production, a one-hour play, Prachir Periye (Note: Bengali: প্রাচীর পেরিয়ে, meaning Crossing the walls), directed by Atiqul Haque Chowdhury. A commission for the formulation of the autonomy policy of Bangladesh Television, as well as Bangladesh Betar, was founded in September 1996 in order to reform Bangladeshi state media. It issued a report recommending granting BTV its autonomy the next year on 30 June. The network established its Chittagong station on 19 December 1996. In May 1997, Bangladesh Television received an Asiavision Award for its coverage of the cyclone that occurred in that year.

=== 1997–2024: Decline of BTV and rise of private television ===
Bangladesh Television was the sole television broadcaster in Bangladesh until the launch of ATN Bangla on satellite television in 1997, and Ekushey Television on terrestrial in 2000. As competition grew over the years, BTV declined and stagnated, and privately owned television channels gained more popularity among locals. However, up to 2003, Bangladesh Television had established fourteen relay stations, covering 93% of the country. In 2004, Bangladesh Television began international satellite broadcasts via BTV World. In March 2005, Ferdous Ara Begum was appointed the first female Director General of BTV. In April 2005, the Bangladeshi adaptation of Sesame Street, Sisimpur, debuted on BTV, which still airs the series as of today. Due to a power outage caused by the North Indian Ocean cyclone on 17 November 2007, BTV temporarily ceased transmissions for nearly three hours that day.

A new license office was inaugurated at the headquarters of BTV in 2008, according to a press release. In 2009, the government of Bangladesh decided to reserve terrestrial television frequencies in the country solely for Bangladesh Television. The BBC World Service developed two television series for BTV, Bishaash and BBC Janala Mojay Mojay Shekha, to promote the English language to Bangladeshi audiences. Both series premiered on the network in October 2010.

Its sister, Sangsad Television, was launched on 25 January 2011, which simultaneously broadcasts live programming from the Jatiya Sangsad Bhaban. On the same day, BTV commenced experimental broadcasts on digital terrestrial television in Dhaka, Chittagong, and Khulna. BTV was available for streaming on phones through Teletalk's 3G services in October 2012. On 5 November 2012, to compete with privately owned local television channels, BTV began broadcasting for 24 hours via satellite television, while still retaining the 18-hour broadcast on terrestrial.

In June 2014, an unused frequency of BTV was scrapped as it disrupted 3G services of mobile operators in Bangladesh. On 24 June 2014, as lightning struck on the tower of Bangladesh Television's Patuakhali relay station, terrestrial broadcasts from there temporarily halted, as a result of the damages caused by the lightning. BTV, along with GTV and Maasranga Television, broadcast the 2016 Asia Cup. Bangladesh Television opened the country's first television museum on 1 December 2016.

BTV, along with Maasranga Television and Nagorik, was the broadcaster of the 2018 FIFA World Cup in Bangladesh. The network began broadcasting in India via DD Free Dish on 2 September 2019, via the Bangabandhu-1 satellite. To celebrate BTV's 55th anniversary in 2019, privately owned Channel i organized a special program in its headquarters, which was broadcast on both networks. BTV inaugurated two new digital studios on 8 February 2020, at the BTV Bhaban, as a part of the network's renaissance. During the COVID-19 pandemic, BTV, along with Sangsad Television, began broadcasting educational programming for secondary-level students. It had also reaired some of its classic television series. BTV announced the establishment an educational channel to make remote learning more effective on students, which was also planned way back in 2008.

On 8 February 2021, Sohrab Hossain was appointed as Bangladesh Television's new director general. On 13 March 2021, Bangladesh Television announced that they will be establishing 6 more regional stations, which was originally to be accomplished by 2023. The network officially launched its app in May 2021, in which four channels, including BTV Dhaka, BTV Chittagong, BTV World, and Sangsad Television, can be streamed worldwide. It also planned to launch its own DTH service soon. Bangladesh Television inaugurated its high definition broadcasts on its 57th anniversary in 2021. On the same day, a Bangabandhu Corner dedicated to the first president of Bangladesh, Sheikh Mujibur Rahman, was inaugurated at the headquarters of Bangladesh Television.

In May 2022, the Government of Bangladesh ordered the broadcast of BTV's channels in airports across the country. The High Court of Bangladesh revived the trial for the four BTV officials killed in 1975 on 31 August 2022, lifting a stay order issued on 25 April 2010. In October 2022, Bangladesh Television began airing the first 2D animated series fully produced in Bangladesh, Jungle Mangal. In November 2022, with the cost of 980 million BDT, Bangladesh Television gained the rights to air the 2022 FIFA World Cup held in Qatar. As there were allegations of corruption against the chief engineer of the television network, the Anti-Corruption Commission raided the headquarters of Bangladesh Television on 16 May 2023. In June 2023, Jahangir Alam was appointed as the new director general of Bangladesh Television.

==== 2024 arson attack ====
Amid the quota reform protests, some unidentified individuals stormed the headquarters of Bangladesh Television and set it ablaze on 18 July 2024. The main building was also vandalized. Following the incident, BTV ceased all broadcasts at approximately 19:00 BST, after evacuating all staff members. Broadcasts resumed the following day on 19 July at 16:00 (BST). Prime Minister Sheikh Hasina later visited the headquarter building on July 26 and called for the punishment of the perpetrators.

=== 2024–present: Post-revolution ===
On 18 August 2024, the adviser of information and broadcasting, Nahid Islam, called for the speedy modernization of all institutions under the Information and Broadcasting Ministry including BTV, criticizing them for being stagnant. He stated that BTV was more like the network itself of the 1980s and 1990s. On the same day, Jahangir Alam was removed as the director general, being appointed as the Officer on Special Duty in the Ministry of Public Administration. Nahid Islam later advised BTV not to broadcast any programming pleasing the government, and instead to work in favor of the people. Mahbubul Alam is appointed as the new director general of Bangladesh Television on 22 September 2024. The network launched its news-oriented channel, BTV News, on 31 December 2024.

On 19 June 2025, a five-member committee was formed ensuring the autonomy of Bangladesh Television and Bangladesh Betar, which would also review media policies during Hasina's premiership from 2009 to 2024 and work on a roadmap implementing the recommendations of the Media Reform Commission. On 12 August 2025, Bangladesh Television announced on its official social media pages that Notun Kuri would return to the air after two decades. It began airing again three days later. Along with Somoy TV and T Sports, BTV is the official Bangladeshi broadcaster of the 2026 FIFA World Cup. On 7 June 2026, the Cabinet Committee on Government Purchase approved a proposal for Bangladesh Television to acquire the all-media broadcasting rights of the 2026 FIFA World Cup directly from FIFA. On 6 August 2026, Kazi Jesin was announced as the new director general of Bangladesh Television on a one-year contractual basis.

== Operations ==
=== List of directors general ===
- Jamil Chowdhury
- Mostafizur Rahman
- 2005: Ferdous Ara Begum
- 2008: Kamal U Ahmed
- 2009–2012: Kazi Abu Zafar Siddique
- 2012–2014: M Hamid
- 2014-2016: Abdul Mannan
- 2016–2021: SM Haroon-or-Rashid
- 2021–2023: Sohrab Hossain
- 2023–2024: Jahangir Alam
- 2024–2026: Mahbubul Alam
- 2026–present: Kazi Jesin

== Television stations ==
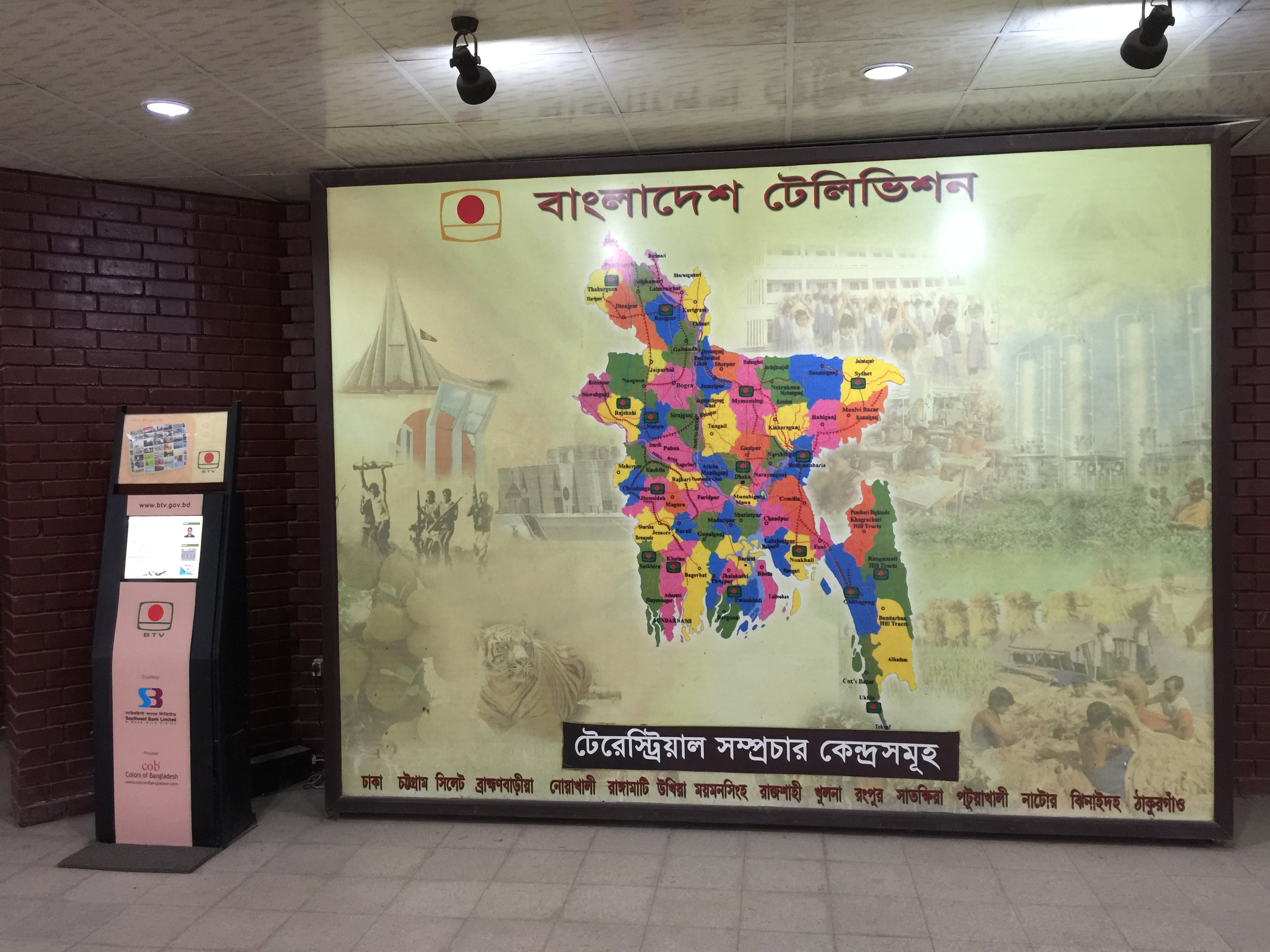
A map of Bangladesh, signifying all the television stations of BTV.

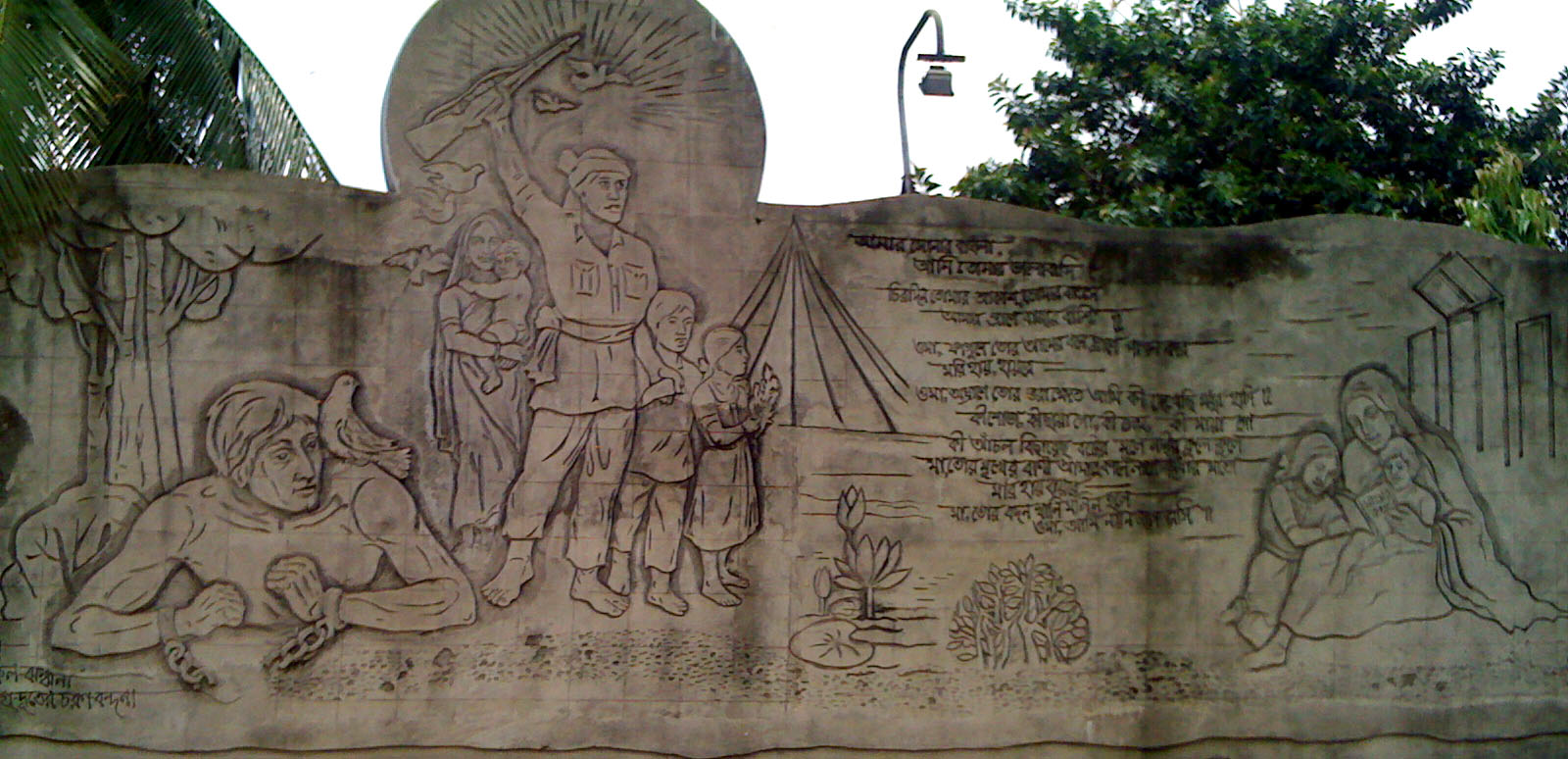
A mural on the front wall of Bangladesh Television head office.

Bangladesh Television operates two main television stations in Dhaka and Chittagong, of which the station in Dhaka is relayed nationwide via its fourteen relay stations, known as upakendra (উপকেন্দ্র) in Bengali, throughout Bangladesh. About 2 million television sets in the country receive signals from BTV, which covers more than 90% of the Bangladeshi area. VHF Band III, UHF Band IV, and UHF Band V are reserved for use by Bangladesh Television.

The relay stations are located at Natore, Khulna, Mymensingh, Sylhet, Rangpur, Noakhali, Brahmanbaria, Thakurgaon, Rajshahi, Jhenaidah, Satkhira, Patuakhali, Ukhia, and Rangamati respectively. The network announced to establish six more regional BTV stations for the rest of Bangladesh's divisions, namely Barisal, Khulna, Mymensingh, Rajshahi, Rangpur, and Sylhet. The first station of BTV outside Dhaka was established in Natore in 1974. Later, more relay stations of BTV were established across the country. BTV's first contemporary regional television station was established in Chittagong in 1996.

=== Main television stations ===
- BTV Dhaka or BTV National – The largest and main television station of Bangladesh Television, headquartered in Rampura and mostly branded on-air as 'BTV'. It commenced transmissions for the first time in 1964 as a PTV-affiliated station of Dacca in the then East Pakistan. After Bangladesh's independence, the station was rebranded as BTV and was the only major station until 1996. It is relayed nationwide via its terrestrial relay stations and formerly via BTV's satellite channel, BTV World. BTV Dhaka is a free-to-air television channel. It broadcasts on VHF channel 9 on analog terrestrial television and VHF channel 6 on digital terrestrial television.
- BTV Chittagong – BTV's first and currently the sole regional television station, inaugurated in 1996. It began broadcasting on satellite television in 2016 and is the second terrestrial television station in Bangladesh. It broadcasts programming for the Chittagonians and the indigenous peoples of the Chittagong Hill Tracts. BTV Chittagong has been broadcasting on a full-day basis since 19 December 2021.

=== Relay television stations ===
- BTV Natore – The first television station of Bangladesh Television outside of Dhaka, inaugurated in 1974 by Sheikh Mujibur Rahman. It was a regional station airing original programming but was later converted to a relay station simulcasting programming from BTV's Dhaka station in approximately September 1975, As of August 1989, BTV Natore broadcast on VHF channel 8 with a 90 kilowatt transmitter.
- BTV Khulna – Experimental broadcasts from the station commenced in the year 1976. It subsequently went on the air on 11 March 1977. Despite numerous attempts, the station has not been able to be converted into a full-fledged regional television station as of today.
- BTV Mymensingh – It was established in May 1979 on VHF channel 12 It is slated to be converted into a regional television station.
- BTV Rajshahi – Originally planned prior to Bangladesh's independence, the decision to set up the station only occurred in 1994. The relay station was established on 13 June 2001 by the then prime minister Sheikh Hasina. Despite pledges and efforts, it has still not yet been converted.
- BTV Rangpur – It was established in December 1978. It was announced on 8 January 2021 that it would be converted within the next two and a half years, although it is still yet to be converted.
- BTV Sylhet – Originally planned to be established by the end of 1975, the station went operational in June 1977. An initiative was taken to convert the station to a full-fledged regional one, although it has not yet been converted as of today.

==== Other relay stations ====
City	Station	Established	Frequency	Notes
Noakhali	BTV Noakhali Upakendra	1975–1984	VHF channel 12	
Brahmanbaria	BTV Brahmanbaria Upakendra	16 May 1997	VHF channel 5	
Thakurgaon	BTV Thakurgaon Upakendra	1999–2003	VHF channel 10	
Jhenaidah	BTV Jhenaidah Upakendra	1999–2003	VHF channel 5	
Satkhira	BTV Satkhira Upakendra	circa 1980s	VHF channel 7	
Patuakhali	BTV Patuakhali Upakendra	1999–2003	VHF channel 7	
Ukhia, Cox's Bazar	BTV Ukhia Upakendra	1975–1984	VHF channel 10	
Rangamati	BTV Rangamati Upakendra	14 July 2001	VHF channel 8	

=== Satellite television ===
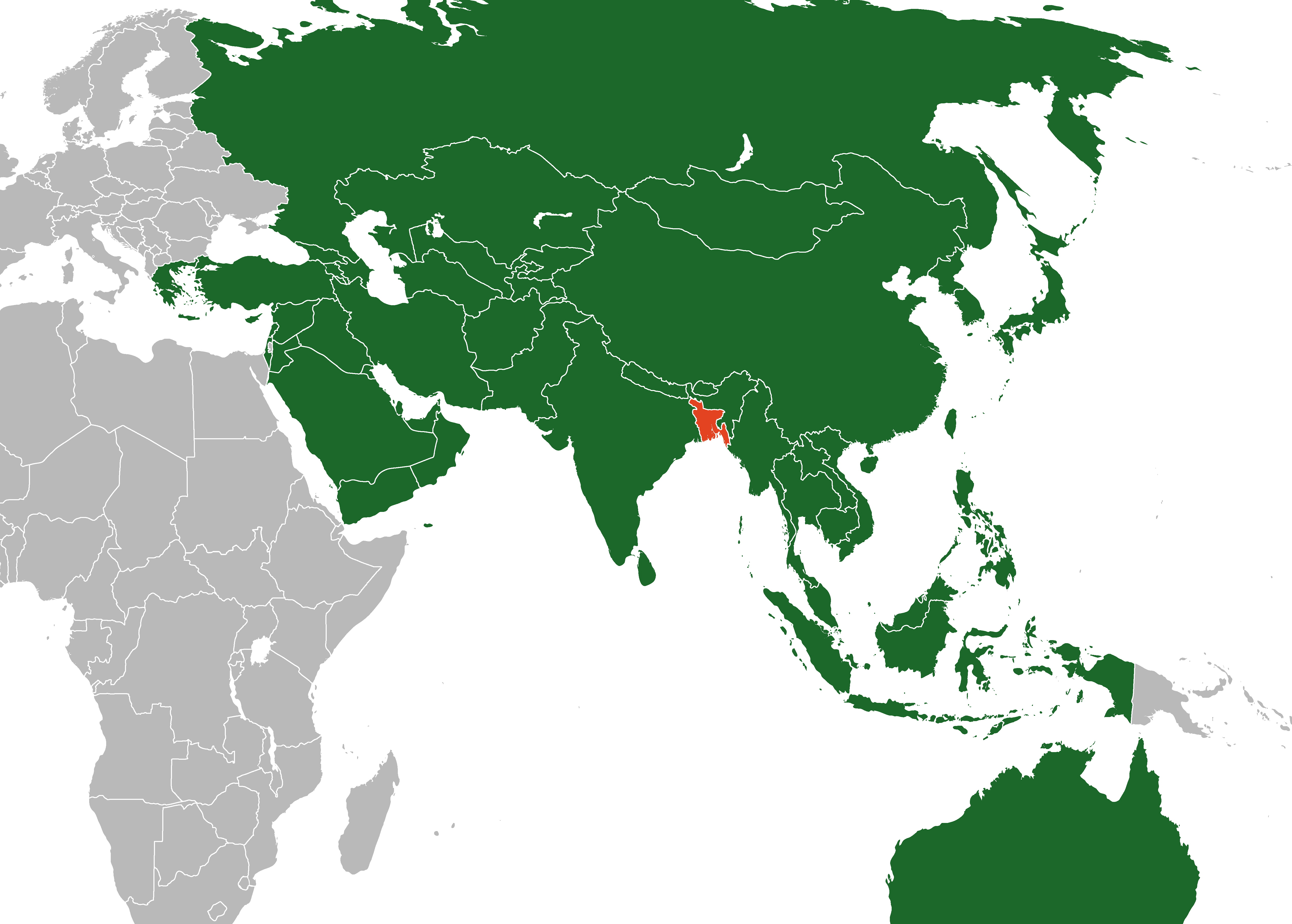
Countries where BTV can be received through AsiaSat 7 Satellite shown in green, host country in red.

BTV broadcasts worldwide through satellite television. An international channel, BTV World was launched on 11 April 2004, the same year when BTV itself also began broadcasting on satellite. BTV World broadcast on a full-day basis, and BTV's satellite feed simulcast the transmission of BTV World, when the channel closed down for the night, as the terrestrial feed shut off. BTV World was later shut down on 31 December 2024, being replaced with BTV News. BTV broadcasts in over 49 countries via the AsiaSat 7 satellite, covering almost the entire continent of Asia.

In 2016, BTV Chittagong began satellite transmissions with airtime hours increasing over time, which broadcast in 60 countries worldwide. In 2018, Bangladesh Television began broadcasting through the Bangabandhu-1 satellite, along with several other local television channels. Via the Bangabandhu-1 satellite, the network's television signals can be received in the Middle East and North Africa.

=== Specialized television channels ===
Channel	Launched	Genre	Notes
BTV News	31 December 2024	News	Replaced BTV World

== Internet ==
Bangladesh Television is available on several social media platforms, including Facebook, Twitter, and YouTube. It has also been broadcasting live on IPTV and mobile TV services from 12 November 2013. Bangladesh Television's channels, along with Sangsad Television, are made available for streaming worldwide via the BTV app since May 2021.

== Logo ==
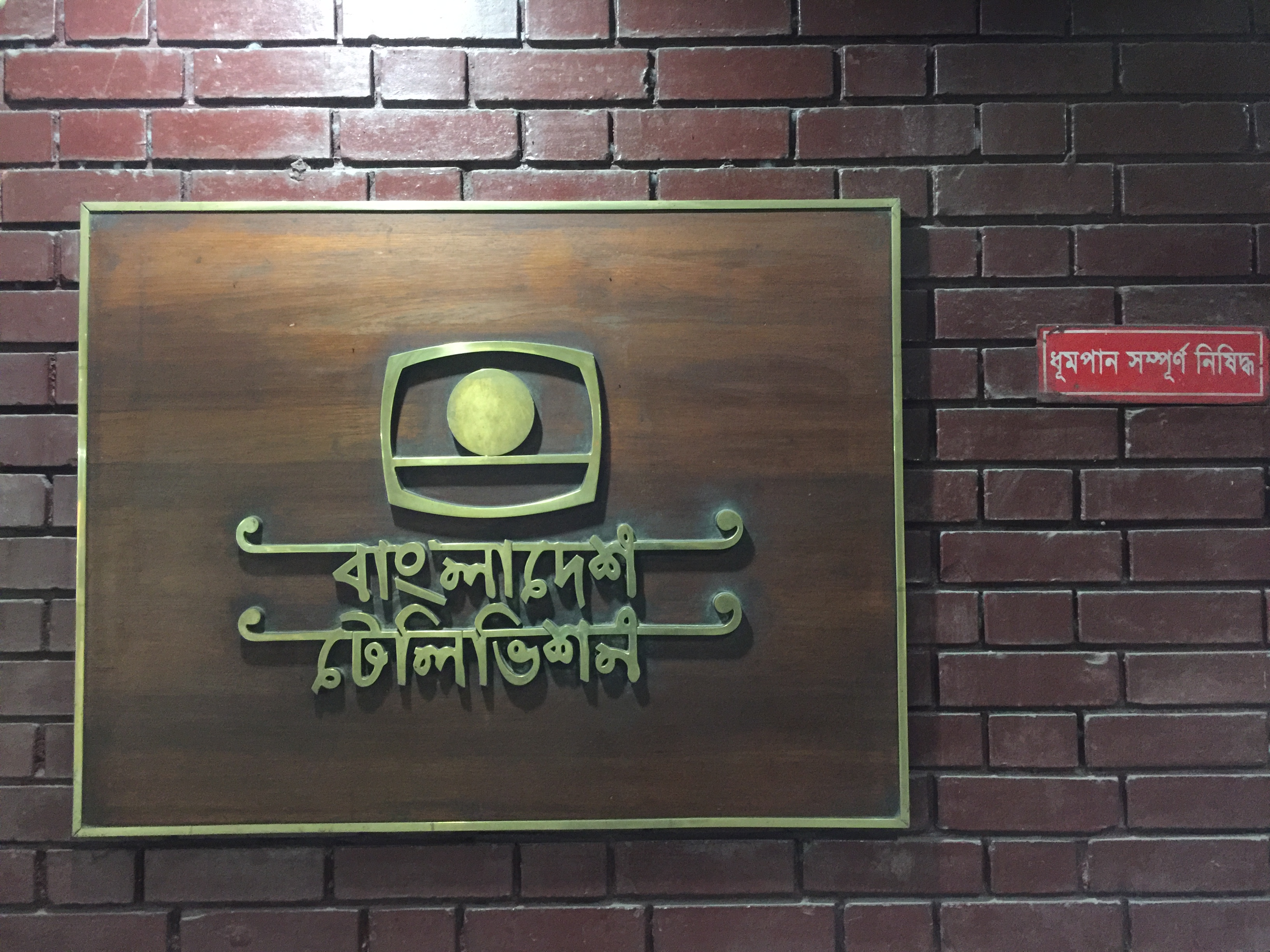
The logo of Bangladesh Television at its headquarters.

The logo of Bangladesh Television was created by a committee of artists comprising Mohiuddin Faroque, Quamrul Hassan, and Zainul Abedin, with chief art director Imdad Hossain finalising the design. Nevertheless, it is currently in use since then. The logo consists of a 60s-style television screen with a red disc and a green line inside, resembling a sunrise. It is one of the most recognizable logos in Bangladesh, as it has been used since the country itself gained independence.

Shortly after Kazi Jesin was appointed director general of BTV, the network posted on its official Facebook page on 30 August 2026, inviting the public to share new logo designs, due on 10 September, implying that BTV was changing its logo as part of reforms. This sudden decision was criticised by multiple prominent people, including actors Abul Hayat and Dolly Johur, singer Khurshid Alam, and former deputy director general Kha Ma Harun, who argued that a logo is merely a signature and changing it is not enough to transform the face of an institution.

== Programming ==
Bangladesh Television has a diversified set of programming. It mainly consists of dramas, news, educational, public affairs, talk shows, and others. It also broadcasts sports programming, typically cricket matches. BTV also airs English-language news and entertainment programming, including acquired foreign television series. During its anniversaries, Bangladesh Television broadcasts documentaries regarding the history of the network, such as DIT theke Rampura, which was aired on its 50th anniversary in 2014. The network terrestrially broadcasts from 7'o clock at morning to after 12 midnight. Its Chittagong station broadcasts all day, along with BTV World. BTV, however, also broadcasts all day on satellite and cable television. More than 90% of the programming broadcast on Bangladesh Television is produced by the network itself.

During the 1980s to 1990s, Bangladesh Television created several popular television series, such as Ei Shob Din Ratri, Bohubrihi, Ayomoy, Ityadi, Kothao Keu Nei, Aaj Robibar, and many others. It has also aired several foreign television series, such as Alif Laila and The Sword of Tipu Sultan, which helped with the network's success. The era from the 1980s to the year 2000 was often called the "golden age" of Bangladesh Television. The network was also popular among Bengali-speaking populations in India near the country's border with Bangladesh during this time.

Following the fall of Sheikh Hasina's government, the programming structure of Bangladesh Television changed drastically. However, some programming was still found to be appeasing the government even if the interim government no longer mandated the network to do so. Three new series premiered on the network, which were Fascibader Dinlipi (Note: Bengali: ফ্যাসিবাদের দিনলিপি, meaning The Diary of Fascism), Nipironer Golpo (Note: Bengali: নিপীড়নের গল্প, meaning The Story of Torture), regarding corruption and torture under the Awami League–led government, and Agamir Bangladesh (Note: Bengali: আগামীর বাংলাদেশ, meaning 'Bangladesh in the Future'), which premiered on 7 September 2024. For a long time, privately owned television channels were mandated to broadcast BTV's two o'clock news bulletin. This mandate was removed on 18 September 2024, when Information and Broadcasting Adviser Nahid Islam stated that the channels no longer need to do so.

== Reception ==
As of 2014, 1.2% of the television audience in Bangladesh watched BTV. The network's then director general, Haroon Or Rashid, once stated that if BTV does not change, it will become 'obsolete'.

By 2018, Bangladesh Television began regaining its fame and relevancy, after the network reformed its programming, which led to a tremendous increase in viewership. According to Hasanul Haq Inu, the then minister of information of Bangladesh, around 83% of the country's population watched BTV in that year.

== See also ==
- List of television stations in Bangladesh
- Mass media in Bangladesh
