= Ministry of Information and Broadcasting (Bangladesh) =

Government ministry of Bangladesh

- Bengali: তথ্য ও সম্প্রচার মন্ত্রণালয়
- Government Seal of Bangladesh

Ministry overview
- Formed: 16 December 1971; 54 years ago
- Jurisdiction: Government of Bangladesh
- Headquarters: Bangladesh Secretariat, Dhaka
- Annual budget: ৳1190 crore (US$97 million) (2026-2027)
- Minister responsible: Andaleeve Rahman Partho
- Minister of State responsible: Yaser Khan Chowdhury
- Ministry executives: Mahbuba Farzana, Secretary
- Child agencies: Information Commission; Directorate of Mass Communication; Department of Films & Publications
- Website: Ministry of Information

The Ministry of Information and Broadcasting (Bengali: তথ্য ও সম্প্রচার মন্ত্রণালয়, romanized: Tôthyo O Shômprochar Montronaloy) is a ministry of the Government of Bangladesh responsible for information, broadcasting, the press, and film policy. It serves as the country’s principal ministry for information and media affairs and oversees the formulation and administration of relevant rules, regulations, and laws. The ministry is also responsible for government information dissemination, media regulation, public information, and the release of government information and data to the public and international communities.

== About ==
The Ministry is responsible for all the press and broadcasting arm of the Bangladesh Government. The Bangladesh Film Censor Board is the other important body under this ministry being responsible for the regulation of motion pictures shown in Bangladesh. The current Minister of Information and Broadcasting is Mahfuj Alam

== Organisation ==
There are 14 agencies and departments under the Ministry of Information and Broadcasting of Bangladesh. They are as follows:

- Information Commission (Information)
  - Department of Press Information
  - Press Institute of Bangladesh
  - Bangladesh Sangbad Sanstha
  - Bangladesh Press Council
- Directorate of Mass Communication (Broadcasting)
  - National Institute of Mass Communication
  - Bangladesh Television
  - Bangladesh Betar
- Department of Films & Publications (Films)
  - Bangladesh Film and Television Institute
  - Bangladesh Film Development Corporation
  - Bangladesh Film Certification Board
  - Bangladesh Film Archive

== See also ==
- Media of Bangladesh
- Bangladesh Journalists Welfare Trust
