= List of Bengali-language television channels =

== Bangladesh ==
=== State owned ===
Name	Launched	Headquarters
BTV Dhaka	25 December 1964	Rampura, Dhaka
BTV Chittagong	19 December 1996	Pahartali, Chittagong
BTV News	31 December 2024	Rampura, Dhaka
Sangsad Bangladesh	25 January 2011	Rampura, Dhaka

=== Privately owned ===
==== Mixed entertainment ====
Name	Launched	Headquarters
Ananda TV	11 March 2018	Banani, Dhaka
Asian TV	18 January 2013	Gulshan, Dhaka
ATN Bangla	16 July 1997	Kawran Bazar, Dhaka
Bangla TV	19 May 2017	Mouchak Market, Dhaka
Banglavision	31 March 2006	Bir Uttam C.R. Dutta Road, Dhaka
Bijoy TV	16 December 2011	Banglamotor, Dhaka
Boishakhi Television	27 December 2005	Mohakhali, Dhaka
Channel 9	30 January 2012	Panthapath, Dhaka
Channel i	1 October 1999	Tejgaon, Dhaka
Deepto TV	18 November 2015	Tejgaon, Dhaka
Desh TV	26 March 2009	Malibagh, Dhaka
Ekushey Television	14 April 2000; 29 March 2007 (relaunch)	Kawran Bazar, Dhaka
Global Television	30 June 2022	Tejgaon, Dhaka
Green TV	19 May 2023	Progoti Sarani, Dhaka
GTV	12 June 2012	Segun Bagicha, Dhaka
Maasranga Television	30 July 2011	Banani, Dhaka
Mohona TV	11 November 2010	Mirpur, Dhaka
My TV	15 April 2010	Hatirjheel, Dhaka
Nagorik	1 March 2018	Khilkhet, Dhaka
NTV	2 July 2003	Kawran Bazar, Dhaka
RTV	26 December 2005	Kawran Bazar, Dhaka
SA TV	19 January 2013	Gulshan, Dhaka

==== News ====
Name	Launched	Headquarters
ATN News	7 June 2010	Kawran Bazar, Dhaka
Channel 1	24 January 2006 (original); 27 April 2026 (relaunch)	Gulshan, Dhaka
Channel 24	24 May 2012	Tejgaon, Dhaka
DBC News	21 September 2016	Mohakhali, Dhaka
Ekattor TV	21 June 2012	Baridhara, Dhaka
Independent Television	28 July 2011	Tejgaon, Dhaka
Jamuna Television	5 April 2014	Baridhara, Dhaka
News24	28 July 2016	Bashundhara Residential Area, Dhaka
Somoy TV	17 April 2011	Banglamotor, Dhaka
Star News	20 January 2026	Tejgaon Industrial Area, Dhaka

==== Religious ====
Name	Launched	Headquarters
Islamic TV	April 2007 (original); January 2026 (relaunch)	Hatirpool, Dhaka

==== Music ====
Name	Launched	Headquarters

==== Kids ====
Name	Launched	Headquarters
Duronto TV	15 October 2017	Banani, Dhaka

==== Sports ====
Name	Launched	Headquarters
T Sports	9 November 2020	Bashundhara Residential Area, Dhaka

==== Infotainment ====
Name	Launched	Headquarters
Ekhon	9 June 2022	Tikatuli, Dhaka
Nexus Television	30 July 2021	Gulshan, Dhaka

=== Defunct ===
Name	Launched	Closed	Headquarters	Notes
BTV World	11 April 2004	31 December 2024	Rampura, Dhaka	Replaced with BTV News
Channel 16	16 December 2011	2 December 2014	Kawran Bazar, Dhaka	
CSB News	March 2007	6 September 2007	Uttara, Dhaka	Soon to relaunch
Diganta Television	28 August 2008	6 May 2013	Paltan, Dhaka	Soon to relaunch

== Canada ==
Name	Launched	Headquarters
ATN Bangla	19 October 2005	Markham, Ontario

== India ==
=== State owned ===
Name	Launched	Headquarters
DD Bangla	9 August 1975	Kolkata, West Bengal
DD Tripura	1994	Agartala, Tripura

=== West Bengal ===
==== News ====
Name	Launched	Headquarters
ABP Ananda	6 June 2005	Kolkata, West Bengal
Calcutta News	14 February 2016	Kolkata, West Bengal
Kolkata TV	27 March 2006	Kolkata, West Bengal
News Time	2010	Kolkata, West Bengal
News18 Bangla	11 March 2014	Kolkata, West Bengal
RCTV Sangbad	20 August 2003	Siliguri, West Bengal
Republic Bangla	1 March 2021	Kolkata, West Bengal
Tara News	21 February 2005	Kolkata, West Bengal
TV9 Bangla	14 January 2021	Kolkata, West Bengal
RPlus		Kolkata, West Bengal
High News		Kolkata, West Bengal
Zee 24 Ghanta	2007	Kolkata, West Bengal

==== Entertainment ====
Name	Launched	Headquarters
Akash Aath	2000	Kolkata, West Bengal
Colors Bangla	15 April 2000	Kolkata, West Bengal
Enterr10 Bangla	2019	Kolkata, West Bengal
Ruposhi Bangla	31 August 2009	Kolkata, West Bengal
Sony Aath	1 April 2009	Kolkata, West Bengal
Star Jalsha	8 September 2008	Kolkata, West Bengal
Sun Bangla	3 February 2019	Kolkata, West Bengal
Tara TV	28 April 2000	Kolkata, West Bengal
Zee Bangla	15 September 1999	Kolkata, West Bengal

==== Cinema ====
Name	Launched	Headquarters
Colors Bangla Cinema	2019	Kolkata, West Bengal
Jalsha Movies	16 December 2012	Kolkata, West Bengal
Khushboo Bangla	14 October 2017	Kolkata, West Bengal
Zee Bangla Cinema	23 September 2012	Kolkata, West Bengal

==== Music ====
Name	Launched	Headquarters
Bangla Talkies	21 November 2018	Kolkata, West Bengal
Dhoom Music	2010	Kolkata, West Bengal
Sangeet Bangla	15 April 2005	Kolkata, West Bengal

==== Sports ====
Name	Launched	Headquarters
Star Sports 1 Bangla	5 March 2019	Kolkata, West Bengal

=== Tripura ===
Name	Launched	Headquarters
News Vanguard	2017	Agartala, Tripura

=== Defunct ===
Name	Launched	Closed	Headquarters
Mahuaa Bangla	19 July 2010	December 2012	Kolkata, West Bengal
Sananda TV	25 July 2011	7 November 2012	Kolkata, West Bengal
Tara Muzik	21 February 2005	12 May 2013	Salt Lake, Kolkata

== United Arab Emirates ==
Name	Launched	Headquarters
Peace TV Bangla	22 April 2011	Dubai, Emirate of Dubai

== United Kingdom ==
Name	Launched	Headquarters
ATN Bangla UK	2001	London, England
Bangla TV	16 September 1999	London, England
Channel S	16 December 2004	London, England

== See also ==
- List of Bangladeshi television and radio channels
