= List of television stations in Bangladesh =

Around 55 privately owned television channels were permitted by the Government of Bangladesh as of 2026, of which thirty-eight are currently on air. (Note: Gaan Bangla's broadcasts are currently suspended, which would have otherwise brought the number up to thirty-nine.) Some television channels, including STV-US, CSB News, Diganta Television and Channel 16, have been taken off air. Bangladesh has four state-owned television stations, of which only three broadcast on terrestrial television, which are BTV Dhaka, BTV Chittagong, and Sangsad Television. In total, there are fifty-nine television channels in Bangladesh, with forty-two presently on air.

== State-owned ==
As of today, Bangladesh has four state-owned television channels. Among them, Bangladesh Television (BTV) is the oldest, founded in 1964.

| Name | Native name | Launched | Notes | Reference(s) |
|---|---|---|---|---|
| BTV | বাংলাদেশ টেলিভিশন | 25 December 1964 | Originally part of Pakistan Television, it was revamped into its current form following Bangladesh's independence. | |
| BTV Chittagong | বিটিভি চট্টগ্রাম | 19 December 1996 | Regional station serving the Chittagong division. | |
| BTV News | বিটিভি নিউজ | 31 December 2024 | State-owned news channel that replaced BTV World. | |
| Sangsad Bangladesh | সংসদ বাংলাদেশ টেলিভিশন | 25 January 2011 | Broadcasts live from the National Parliament. | |

=== Relay stations ===
| Name | Native name | Launched | Notes | Reference(s) |
|---|---|---|---|---|
| BTV Khulna | বিটিভি খুলনা | 11 March 1977 | Slated to be converted into a regional station | |
| BTV Mymensingh | বিটিভি ময়মনসিংহ | May 1979 | Slated to be converted into a regional station | |
| BTV Rajshahi | বিটিভি রাজশাহী | 13 June 2001 | Slated to be converted into a regional station | |
| BTV Rangpur | বিটিভি রংপুর | December 1978 | Slated to be converted into a regional station | |
| BTV Sylhet | বিটিভি সিলেট | June 1977 | Slated to be converted into a regional station | |

=== Defunct ===
| Channel | Launched | Closed | Notes |
|---|---|---|---|
| BTV World | 11 April 2004 | 31 December 2024 | State-owned international channel. Replaced by BTV News after closedown. |

== Privately owned ==
=== Mixed entertainment ===
| Name | Native name | Launched | Owner | Notes | Reference(s) |
|---|---|---|---|---|---|
| ATN Bangla | এটিএন বাংলা | 15 July 1997 | Multimedia Production Company Ltd. | Bangladesh's first privately owned television channel. | |
| Channel i | চ্যানেল আই | 1 October 1999 | Impress Group | Bangladesh's first Digital Satellite Television | |
| Ekushey Television | একুশে টেলিভিশন | 14 April 2000 | Ekushey Television Limited | Formerly broadcast via terrestrial television. Shut down in 2002 but returned on satellite television in 2007. | |
| NTV | এনটিভি | 3 July 2003 | International Television Channel Ltd. | | |
| RTV | আরটিভি | 26 December 2005 | Bengal Media Corporation | Formerly known as National Television Limited | |
| Boishakhi TV | বৈশাখী টেলিভিশন | 27 December 2005 | Boishakhi Media Limited (Destiny 2000 Limited) | Formerly owned by BNS Group of Companies | |
| Banglavision | বাংলাভিশন | 31 March 2006 | Shyamol Bangla Media Ltd. | | |
| My TV | মাই টিভি | 15 April 2010 | V.M. International Ltd. | | |
| Mohona Television | মোহনা টিভি | 11 November 2010 | Mohona Television Limited | | |
| Maasranga Television | মাছরাঙ্গা টেলিভিশন | 30 July 2011 | Square Group | | |
| Channel 9 | চ্যানেল নাইন | 30 January 2012 | Virgo Media Limited | | |
| GTV | জিটিভি | 12 June 2012 | Gazi Satellite Television Limited (Gazi Group Limited) | | |
| Asian TV | এশিয়ান টিভি | 18 January 2013 | Asian Group of Industries | | |
| SA TV | এসএ টিভি | 19 January 2013 | S. A. Group | S A Paribahan | |
| Bijoy TV | বিজয় টিভি | 31 May 2013 | Bijoy Television Limited | | |
| Deepto TV | দীপ্ত টিভি | 18 November 2015 | Kazi Media Limited | Kazi Farms Group | |
| Bangla TV | বাংলা টিভি | 19 May 2017 | Akhter Group | British Bangali channel | |
| Nagorik TV | নাগরিক টিভি | 1 March 2018 | Jadoo Media Limited | Mohammadi Group | |
| Ananda TV | আনন্দ টিভি | 11 March 2018 | Abbasuddin Media Ltd. | | |
| Global Television | গ্লোবাল টেলিভিশন | 30 June 2022 | Globe Multimedia Limited | | |
| Green TV | গ্রিন টিভি | 19 May 2023 | Rongdhanu Group | | |
| Channel S | চ্যানেল এস | 12 June 2024 | Sunshine Television Limited | | |

=== News ===
| Name | Native name | Launched | Owner | Notes | Reference(s) |
|---|---|---|---|---|---|
| Channel 1 | চ্যানেল ওয়ান | 24 January 2006 | One Entertainment Limited | Originally launched as a mixed entertainment channel, but was shut down on 27 April 2010. Returned as a news channel on 27 April 2026. | |
| Desh TV | দেশ টিভি | 26 March 2009 | Karnaphuli Group | Formerly a mixed entertainment television channel | |
| ATN News | এটিএন নিউজ | 7 June 2010 | ATN News Limited (Multimedia Production Company Ltd.) | First contemporary news channel in Bangladesh | |
| Somoy TV | সময় টিভি | 17 April 2011 | Somoy Media Limited (City Group) | | |
| Independent Television | ইনডিপেনডেন্ট টেলিভিশন | 28 July 2011 | Independent Television Limited (BEXIMCO) | First local channel to use MPEG-4 | |
| Channel 24 | চ্যানেল টুয়েন্টিফোর | 24 May 2012 | Times Media Limited (Ha-meem Group) | Formerly a mixed entertainment television channel | |
| Ekattor | একাত্তর | 21 June 2012 | Ekattor Media Limited (Meghna Group of Industries) | First full HD news channel | |
| Jamuna Television | যমুনা টেলিভিশন | 5 April 2014 | Jamuna Television Limited (Jamuna Group) | | |
| News24 | নিউজ টুয়েন্টি ফোর | 28 July 2016 | East West Media Group | Bashundhara Group | |
| DBC News | ডিবিসি নিউজ | 21 September 2016 | Dhaka Bangla Media & Communication Ltd. | | |
| Star News | স্টার নিউজ | 20 January 2026 | Nabil Group of Industries | | |

=== Infotainment ===
| Name | Native name | Launched | Owner | Notes | Reference(s) |
|---|---|---|---|---|---|
| Nexus Television | নেক্সাস টেলিভিশন | 30 July 2021 | S. Alam Group of Industries | Non-fiction television channel | |

=== Business-related ===
| Name | Native name | Launched | Owner | Notes | Reference(s) |
|---|---|---|---|---|---|
| Ekhon | এখন | 9 June 2022 | City Group | Formerly Spice Television during its prelaunch | |

=== Religious ===
| Name | Native name | Launched | Owner | Notes | Reference(s) |
|---|---|---|---|---|---|
| Islamic TV | ইসলামিক টিভি | April 2007 | Broadcast Islamic World | Shut down in 2013; returned on 19 February 2026. | |

=== Music ===
| Name | Native name | Launched | Owner | Notes | Reference(s) |
|---|---|---|---|---|---|
| Gaan Bangla (Note: Broadcasting suspended on 11 December 2024) | গান বাংলা | 16 December 2013 | One More Zero Group | | |

=== Children's ===
| Name | Native name | Launched | Owner | Notes | Reference(s) |
|---|---|---|---|---|---|
| Duronto TV | দুরন্ত টিভি | 5 October 2017 | Barind Media Limited | | |

=== Sports ===
| Name | Native name | Launched | Owner | Notes |
|---|---|---|---|---|
| T Sports | টি স্পোর্টস | 9 November 2020 | East West Media Group (Bashundhara Group) | |

=== Defunct ===
| Channel | Launched and closed |
|---|---|
| STV-US | 22 November 2005 – 15 March 2007 |
| CSB News | 9 April 2007 – 6 September 2007 |
| Diganta Television | 28 August 2008 – 6 May 2013 |
| Channel 16 | 16 December 2011 – 2 December 2014 |

=== Upcoming channels ===
- Amar Gaan
- Amar TV
- Cambrian TV
- Channel 21
- Channel 52
- Citizen TV
- Khela TV
- Live TV
- Next TV
- Prime TV
- TV Today

== See also ==
- Television in Bangladesh
- List of radio stations in Bangladesh
- Mass media in Bangladesh
- Telecommunications in Bangladesh
