= Bangla TV =

Bangladeshi Bengali-language TV channel

- Country: United Kingdom (until 2017); Bangladesh
- Broadcast area: Worldwide
- Headquarters: London; Mouchak Market, Dhaka

Programming
- Picture format: 1080i HDTV (downscaled to 16:9 576i for SDTV sets)

History
- Launched: 16 September 1999; 27 years ago (United Kingdom); 19 May 2017; 9 years ago (Bangladesh)
- Closed: 2 November 2017 (United Kingdom)

Links
- Website: banglatv.tv

Availability

Streaming media
- Jagobd: www.jagobd.com/banglatv

Bangla TV (Bengali: বাংলা টিভি) is a Bengali-language satellite and cable television channel founded by Britain-based Feroze Khan in 1998, officially beginning broadcasts the following year, targeting Bengali audiences throughout Europe. It commenced transmissions in Bangladesh on 19 May 2017. Bangla TV was initially based in London from its inception. It would later cease transmissions in the United Kingdom on 2 November 2017, and since then it has only been available in Bangladesh.

== History ==
Bangla TV began broadcasting on 16 December 1998, being founded by Feroze Khan based in London, United Kingdom. The channel was intended for covering news and affairs concerning British Bangladeshis, as well as Bangladeshis in Europe. It was officially launched on 16 September 1999, and subsequently added to Sky UK in November. In January 2000, Bangla TV signed an agreement with United News of Bangladesh to be provided with local and international news items. It operated as a subscription-only channel until 2005, following the launch of its rival Channel S, which was free-to-air. Bangla TV switched over to a non-subscription based model to provide its programming without charge.

In November 2013, Bangla TV gained a license from the Bangladesh Telecommunication Regulatory Commission to broadcast in Bangladesh. It had also received its frequency allocation in January 2015, and officially began broadcasting in that country on 19 May 2017. In July 2017, Bangla TV, along with four other television channels in Bangladesh, signed an agreement with UNICEF to air children's programming for one minute. On 19 May 2019, Bangla TV, along with six other channels, began broadcasting via the Bangabandhu-1 satellite after signing an agreement with BSCL.

=== Temporary removals ===
Bangla TV was removed from Sky channel 786 without explanation on 1 July 2010, before returning on 9 July. It was removed again from the Sky EPG during December 2010 before being found in serious breach of Ofcom rules. The channel returned again on 17 June 2011, under new management. Bangla TV was removed for a third time from the Sky EPG during December 2013 and January 2014 before returning on 10 February 2014. It was removed once again on 7 August 2014 and continued to have intermittent TV transmission for the next couple of years. It would eventually be removed altogether on 2 November 2017, and has never returned since then.

== See also ==
- British Bangladeshi
- List of television stations in Bangladesh
