= BTV World =

BTV's former satellite service

BTV World বিটিভি ওয়ার্ল্ড
- Final logo of the channel
- Country: Bangladesh
- Broadcast area: Worldwide
- Headquarters: Rampura, Dhaka

Programming
- Language: Bengali

Ownership
- Owner: Government of Bangladesh
- Parent: Bangladesh Television
- Sister channels: BTV Chittagong; BTV National; Sangsad Television

History
- Launched: 13 June 2001; 25 years ago
- Closed: 31 December 2024; 20 months ago
- Replaced by: BTV News

Links
- Website: btv.gov.bd

BTV World (Bengali: বিটিভি ওয়ার্ল্ড) was a Bangladeshi Bengali-language satellite and cable television channel owned by the state-owned Bangladesh Television. It began operations on 11 April 2004 via the AsiaSat 3 satellite. It simulcast the broadcasts of BTV Dhaka for most of its schedule, which then simulcasted BTV World's broadcasts during the off-air hours of its terrestrial feed.

BTV World was broadcast worldwide from the BTV Bhaban in Rampura, Dhaka. It was also announced to be converted into an entertainment channel, with a different schedule compared to BTV Dhaka. The channel was shut down on 31 December 2024 and replaced with BTV News. BTV World was a free-to-air television channel.

== History ==
Bangladesh Television originally planned to commence broadcasts on satellite television on 25 December 2003, coinciding with its 39th anniversary, but this was delayed due to technical difficulties. It officially began broadcasting via satellite on 11 April 2004, with the launch of BTV World. It was broadcast via the Hong Kong–based AsiaSat 3, using Band C of the satellite, covering Oceania, Asia, and Europe. BTV World also planned to produce English-language programming for international audiences.

On 5 November 2012, BTV Dhaka began broadcasting on a full-day basis daily via satellite television and, during off-air hours of its terrestrial feed, began simulcasting BTV World's transmissions. As of 2017, BTV World was broadcast in 49 countries worldwide via AsiaSat 7, including the entirety of the continent of Asia. In 2018, BTV World began broadcasting using the Bangabandhu-1 satellite. On 2 September 2019, BTV World was made available on India's DD Free Dish. It also began broadcasting in the Middle East and North Africa on 10 April 2020.

In May 2021, BTV World, along with its sisters, was made available for streaming worldwide via the BTV app. As BTV was airing the T20 World Cup, the popular Ityadi program, normally broadcast on both channels, was solely broadcast on BTV World on 29 October 2021. In May 2022, the Government of Bangladesh ordered the broadcast of BTV World, along with its sisters, in airports across the country. After the arson attack at Bangladesh Television's headquarters on 18 July 2024 during the quota reform protests, BTV World temporarily ceased transmissions on that day. BTV World permanently ceased operations on 31 December 2024 at 19:00 (BST) and was replaced with BTV News.
