= Bijoy TV =

Bangladeshi satellite TV channel

- Country: Bangladesh
- Broadcast area: Nationwide
- Headquarters: Banglamotor, Dhaka

Programming
- Picture format: 1080i HDTV (downscaled to 16:9 576i for SDTV sets)

Ownership
- Owner: Bijoy TV Limited

History
- Launched: 16 December 2011; 14 years ago
- Founder: A. B. M. Mohiuddin Chowdhury

Links
- Website: bijoy.tv

Availability

Streaming media
- Jagobd: jagobd.com/bijoytv

Bijoy TV (Bengali: বিজয় টিভি; lit. 'Victory TV', in reference to Victory Day) is a Bangladeshi Bengali-language privately owned satellite and cable television channel based in Banglamotor, Dhaka. This channel was established by former mayor of Chittagong A. B. M. Mohiuddin Chowdhury. Former Deputy Minister of Education Mohibul Hasan Chowdhury is one of the shareholders and the former managing director of Bijoy TV.

== History ==
Being the first private television channel from Chittagong, Bijoy TV originally began test broadcasts on 16 December 2006, being inaugurated by the mayor of Chittagong A. B. M. Mohiuddin Chowdhury in a ceremony held at the Theatre Institute Chattagram auditorium. It was aimed to put up the potentialities of the port city before the rest of the world. It was later shut down on 15 March 2007 after order from the caretaker government, accusing the channel of broadcasting without permission and a no-objection certificate. Prior to its closure, a show-cause notice was issued on the Chittagong City Corporation on 8 March.

A case against Bijoy TV was later filed on 27 May 2007 by the Anti-Corruption Commission, accusing five individuals, including the mayor, of embezzling BDT 1.4 crore from funds. Chowdhury was also alleged to not float any tender for the television channel. A charge sheet was then filed against Chowdhury, chief engineer Mokhter Alam, and CEO Imtiaz Hossain, on 22 November. Later, in June 2009, Mohiuddin announced the relaunch of Bijoy TV after being released on bail on 8 October 2008. It was then granted a broadcasting license by the Bangladesh Telecommunication Regulatory Commission alongside several other privately owned Bangladeshi television channels on 20 October 2009. The channel has started broadcasting regularly since 16 December 2011.

In July 2017, Bijoy TV, along with four other television channels in Bangladesh, signed an agreement with UNICEF to air children's programming for one minute. On 19 May 2019, Bijoy TV, along with five other channels, began broadcasting via the Bangabandhu-1 satellite after signing an agreement with BSCL. Bijoy TV unveiled a new logo on 31 May 2019. Due to massive vandalism against eight television channels occurred on 5 August 2024 during anti-government protests in Bangladesh, Bijoy TV was one of the channels to go off the air temporarily. Despite this, the channel was shown to gain ratings during its closure due to the faulty TRP system of Bangladesh Satellite Company Limited at the time.
