= Kolkata TV =

Indian Bengali news channel

Kolkata TV কলকাতা টিভি
- Logo used since 2006
- Broadcast area: India (West Bengal)
- Headquarters: Kolkata, West Bengal, India,

Programming
- Language: Bengali
- Picture format: 1080i HDTV

Ownership
- Owner: Sakal Media Group
- Sister channels: Saam TV; News7 Tamil

History
- Launched: 27 March 2006; 20 years ago

Links
- Website: www.kolkatatv.org

Kolkata TV is a 24-hour Bengali news channel launched by SST Media in 2006. It was established by former ABP News staffer Suman Chattopadhyay, and is now owned by Kaustuv Ray, the chair of RP Group. The slogan used by the channel is Raatdin Saatdin (which means "Day-night 7-days"). The channel is run by Calcutta-based RP Techvision (I) Pvt Ltd., and is known for its critical stance on the Modi government, while being sympathetic towards the Trinamool Congress (TMC).

== Kaustuv Ray ==
The channel was taken over in 2009 by the current editor Kaustuv Ray, without buying any shares. He had been the subject of raids by the Enforcement Directorate (ED) in 2018 and was arrested by the Central Bureau of Investigation (CBI) for allegedly defrauding banks to the tune of Rs. 515 crores. He also received a notice from the ED in September 2021.

After this the Ministry of Information and Broadcasting send a notice to the channel authorities, asking them to justify why its license should not be cancelled. The letter, dated 27 September, cited the Ministry of Home Affairs' denial of security clearance to the channel as grounds for cancelling their license. Responding to the notice, Kaustuv Ray said the central government was trying to silence the media critical of the prime minister, adding that: "This is a blatant way to gag the voice of free press. We will continue to raise our voice, we will protest against this fascist undemocratic regime of Mr Modi". The government's move was criticised by leaders of the All India Trinamool Congress (AITC), Indian National Congress, the Communist Party of India (Marxist), Shiv Sena, the Samajwadi Party, and other prominent figures of Bengal society. West Bengal Chief Minister Mamata Banerjee and Bhupesh Baghel, Chief minister of Chhattisgarh, also supported Kolkata TV over this issue. A special CBI Court directed ED officers not to take any coercive action against Kaustuv Ray until the hearing of the case, and the Calcutta High Court put a stay order on the notice issued by the Union Government.

== See also ==
- List of Bengali TV channels
- List of Indian television stations
