= RAJUK Bhaban =

Headquarters of the Rajdhani Unnayan Kartripakkha, Bangladesh

- রাজউক ভবন
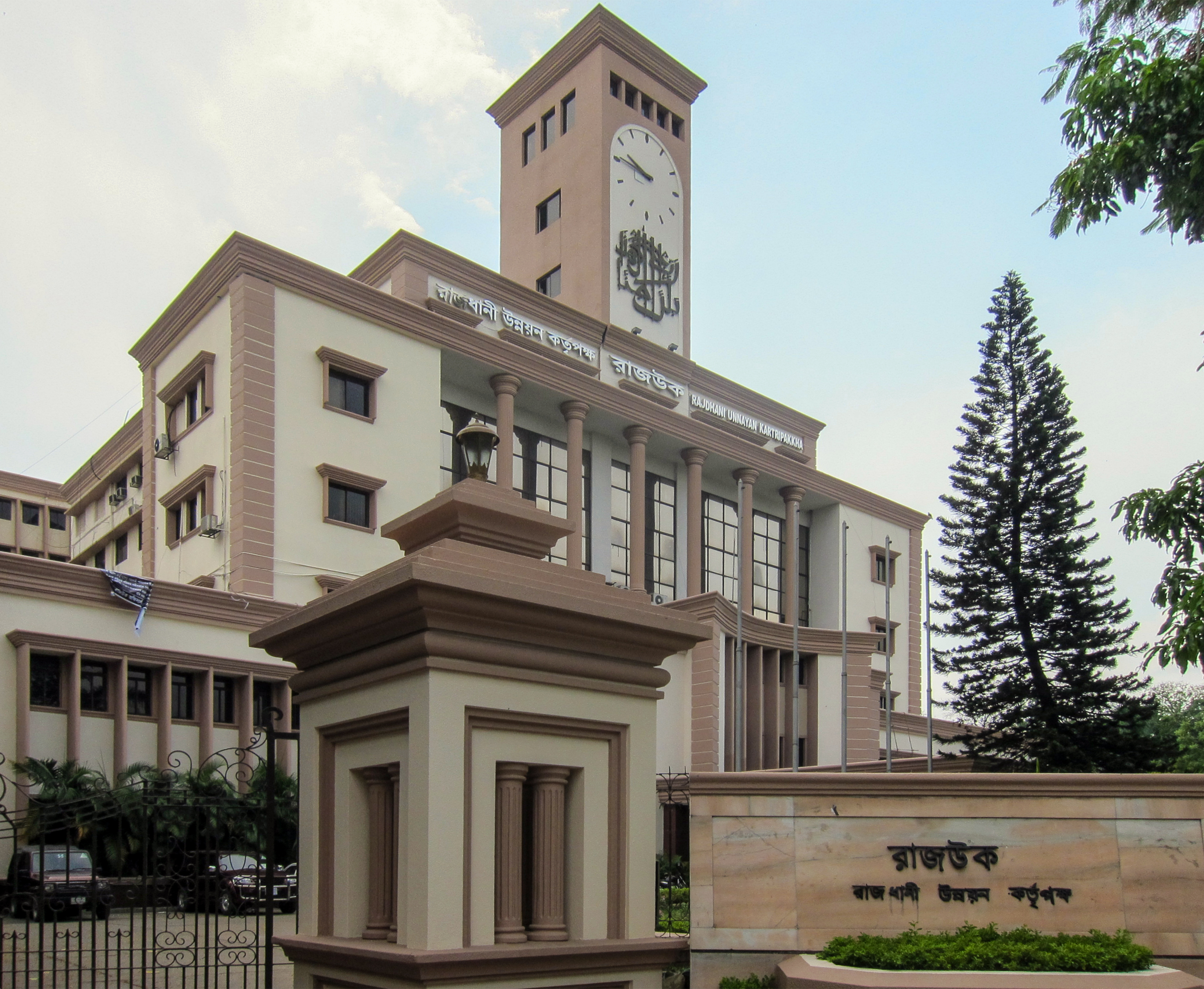
- RAJUK Bhaban in 2015
- Interactive map of the RAJUK Bhaban area
- Former names: DIT Bhaban

General information
- Location: Rajuk Avenue, Dilkhusha, Dhaka
- Coordinates: 23.7263°N 90.4159°E
- Owner: Rajdhani Unnayan Kartripakkha

RAJUK Bhaban (Bengali: রাজউক ভবন) is the head office of Rajdhani Unnayan Kartripakkha (RAJUK), which is the capital development authority of the government of Bangladesh. RAJUK Bhaban is situated at RAJUK Avenue, Dilkhusha, Dhaka-1000.

== History ==
RAJUK Bhaban was established in 1956 as the head office of the Dhaka Improvement Trust (DIT). At that time, the building was called DIT Bhaban. It was designed by architect, Abdulhusein M. Thariani, who was a diploma architect of West Pakistan. The foundation stone was laid on 10 December 1956 by H. S. Suhrawardy, who was the prime minister of Pakistan at that time. The DIT Bhaban was where the first transmissions of television in East Pakistan have been commenced and has since been the headquarters of the Dacca station of Pakistan Television Corporation, later renamed to Bangladesh Television, and has remained that way even after Bangladesh's independence in 1971. However, in 1975, as the new headquarters have been constructed in Rampura, Bangladesh Television moved all its offices and studios to the new building from the DIT Bhaban.

It was renamed RAJUK Bhaban on 30 April 1987, when RAJUK was established, replacing the Dhaka Improvement Trust (DIT).

== Description and architectural value ==
Rajuk Bhaban is one of the primitive buildings of East Pakistan. It is a very congested building. There were so many black columns in the middle phase of RAJUK Bhaban, which created much confusion about the perfect uses of the column in architecture. Architect Thariyani did not think about the climate to design this bhabon. RAJUK Bhaban is mainly a west face Bhaban, which consists of two different buildings named RAJUK, the main building and the RAJUK annex building. These two buildings are connected by a small over bridge. RAJUK main building is a six storied building and RAJUK annex building is an eight storied building. There is a big clock in the top face of the main building.

== Renovation ==
RAJUK Bhaban is an example of the architecture of the Pakistan period. In the early period, RAJUK Bhaban looked like a very simple building but recognizing the historical and architectural importance of RAJUK Bhaban, RAJUK took the initiative to renovate it. The main phase of renovation took place after 2000.
