= ATN News =

Bangladeshi television channel

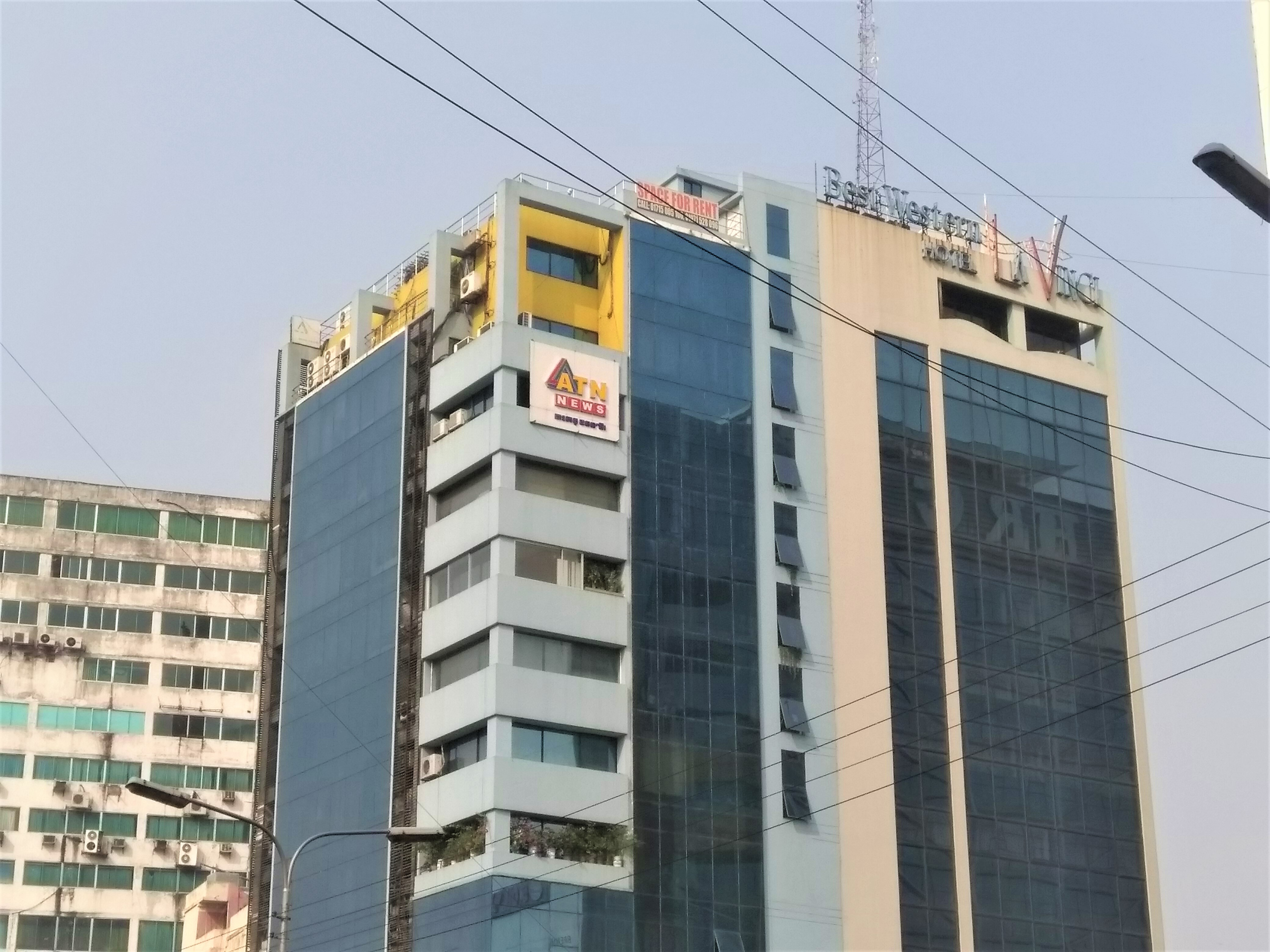
- The headquarters of ATN News in Kawran Bazar
- Country: Bangladesh
- Broadcast area: Worldwide
- Headquarters: Kawran Bazar, Dhaka

Programming
- Language: Bengali
- Picture format: 1080i HDTV (downscaled to 16:9 576i for SDTV sets)

Ownership
- Owner: Multimedia Production Company
- Key people: Mahfuzur Rahman (Chairman and Managing Director)
- Sister channels: ATN Bangla

History
- Launched: 7 June 2010; 16 years ago

Links
- Website: www.atnnewstv.com

ATN News (Bengali: এটিএন নিউজ) is a Bangladeshi Bengali-language satellite and cable news-oriented television channel owned by the Multimedia Production Company Limited, owned by Mahfuzur Rahman. It is a sister channel of ATN Bangla. It was launched on 7 June 2010 as the first contemporary news television channel in Bangladesh, as the short-lived CSB News was shut down in 2007.

== History ==
The Bangladesh Telecommunication Regulatory Commission granted ATN News a license to broadcast on 20 October 2009, alongside several other Bangladeshi privately owned television channels. The channel broadcast its first test transmission on 1 May 2010, and officially went on air on 7 June 2010 with the "Banglar Chobbish Ghonta" (বাংলার ২৪ ঘন্টা; lit. '24 hours of Bengal') slogan. Nirman Rosayon, a programme dedicated to ancient and modern architecture in Bangladesh, premiered on ATN News on 18 March 2023. The channel organized the Islamic Olympiad in February 2024. On 5 August 2024, the channel, along with its sister ATN Bangla, went off the air temporarily after its offices in Dhaka were attacked and set on fire by protesters during the non-cooperation movement, shortly after prime minister Sheikh Hasina resigned. It resumed broadcasts three days later on 8 August 2024. Despite this, the channel was shown to gain around 284,000 viewers during its closure due to the faulty TRP system of Bangladesh Satellite Company Limited at the time.

== Programming ==
ATN News broadcasts news and current affairs programming on multiple topics, such as agriculture, business, entertainment, fashion, politics, sports, etc. One of its notable aspects is that during the first year of its launch, the channel did not show gruesome scenes or corpses.

=== List of programming ===
- Amader Kotha
- Business Lunch
- Box Office
- Connecting Bangladesh
- Corporate
- Dark Room
- Ei Banglay
- Ekdin Protidin
- First Aid
- Follow Up
- Jole Jongole
- News Hour Xtra
- Nostalgia
- Politics Plus
- Power Talk
- Sports Insight
- Young Nite

== Management ==
Television journalist and media personality Mishuk Munier joined ATN News as CEO and chief editor in November 2010. He worked with the television channel until his death on 13 August 2011. Bangladeshi journalist Abed Khan subsequently took over the position of CEO and chief editor, remaining as such until his resignation on 20 April 2013. The current executive director of the channel is Md. Mosharrof Hossain.

== See also ==
- ATN Bangla
- List of television stations in Bangladesh
