= Ekhon =

Bangladeshi business-related television channel

Ekhon এখন
- Country: Bangladesh
- Broadcast area: Nationwide
- Headquarters: Tikatuli, Dhaka

Programming
- Language: Bengali
- Picture format: 1080i HDTV (downscaled to 16:9 576i for SDTV sets)

Ownership
- Owner: City Group

History
- Launched: 9 June 2022; 4 years ago
- Former names: Spice Television (prelaunch)

Links
- Website: www.ekhon.tv

Ekhon

YouTube information
- Channel: EKHON TV
- Years active: 2022–present
- Subscribers: 4.13 million
- Last updated: 2 March 2026

Ekhon (Bengali: এখন; Bengali pronunciation: [ækʰon]; lit. 'now') is a Bangladeshi Bengali-language satellite and cable business-related infotainment television channel owned by Spice Television Limited, a subsidiary of the City Group, one of Bangladesh's largest conglomerates.

It is Bangladesh's first television channel dedicated to business and financial programming. Ekhon is based in Tikatuli, Dhaka.

== History ==
=== Licensing and test broadcasts ===
Ekhon was licensed as "Spice Television" (Bengali: স্পাইস টেলিভিশন) by the Bangladesh Telecommunication Regulatory Commission in 2017. It commenced experimental broadcasts via the Bangladesh-1 satellite on 30 July 2021 using the Spice Television name, after it signed an agreement with BSCL on 28 July of that year to use the satellite for broadcasting. The channel later commenced the 'Nirman Porbo' test broadcast on 16 December 2021, coinciding the Bangladeshi victory day. On 30 May 2022, Ekhon signed a corporate agreement with state-owned telecommunications company TeleTalk, which would provide various services to the television channel at an affordable price.

=== Launch ===
Although originally planning to do so on 16 December 2021, the channel was officially launched using the "Ekhon" name on 9 June 2022, as the first television channel in Bangladesh to air business-related programming and the thirty-seventh television channel overall to be launched in the country.

== Programming ==
The programming line of Ekhon consists of shows and news relating to finance and the economy. However, it also focuses on sports, agriculture, climate, and more.

=== List of programmes ===
- Apnar Shongey
- Ekhon Anondo
- Ekhon Mathe

== Controversies ==
On 19 February 2026, Ekhon gave four television journalists intermittent leave without any immediate reason. This move was criticized by the Dhaka Reporters Unity.
