= Theatre Institute Chattagram =

Theater Institute Chattagram
- থিয়েটার ইনস্টিটিউট চট্টগ্রাম
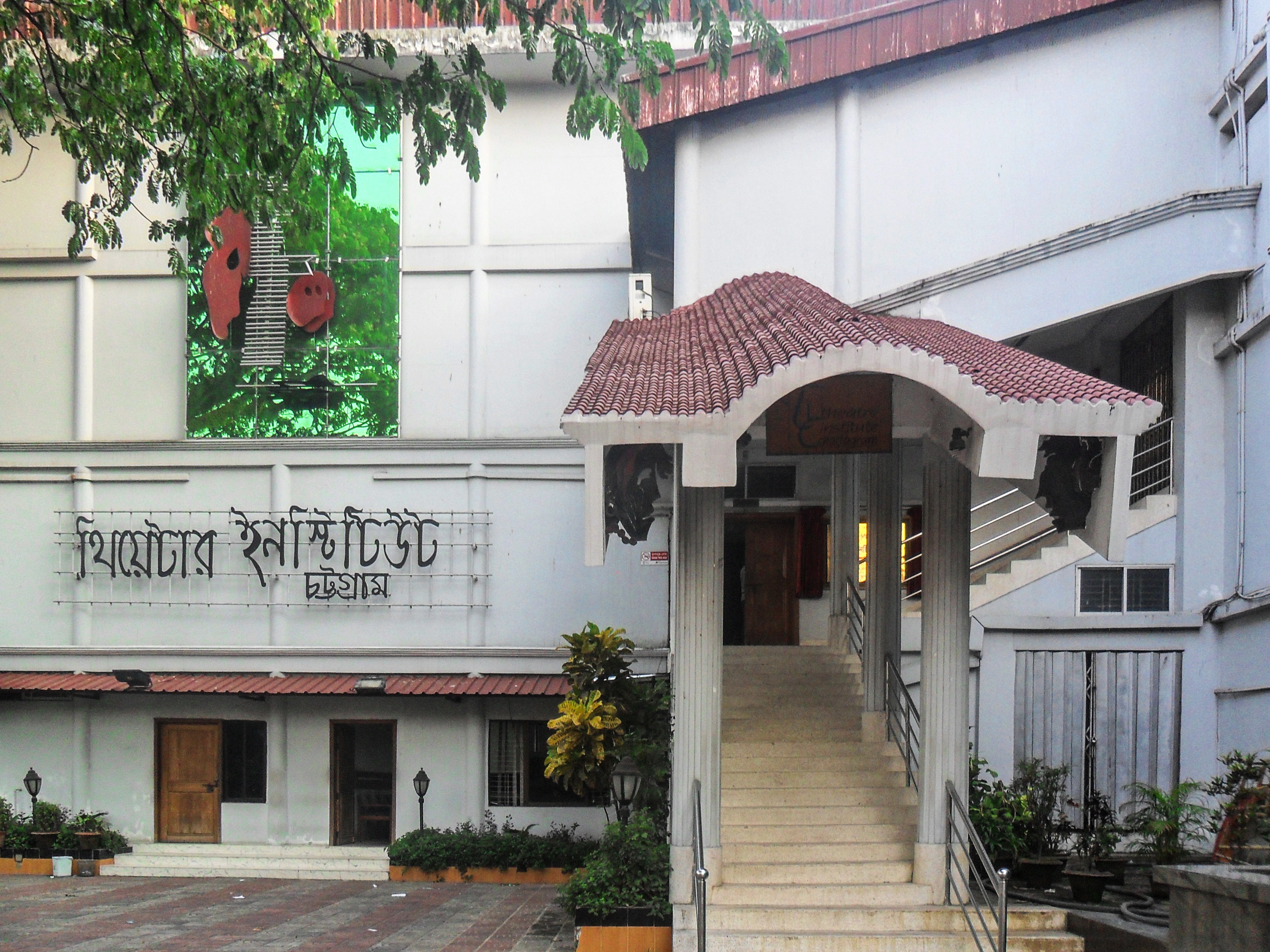
- Theater Institute Chattagram
- Interactive map of the Theater Institute Chattagram area

General information
- Status: Active
- Type: Cultural
- Classification: Theater
- Location: K. C. Dey Road, Chittagong, Bangladesh
- Coordinates: 22°20′13.61″N 91°49′58.36″E
- Owner: Chittagong City Corporation

Theater Institute Chattagram (TIC) is a theatre and cultural convention center located in Chattogram, Bangladesh. It is a theater hall of drama, film and performing arts. The institute is organized and controlled by the City Corporation of the Chittagong district.

== Activities ==
The institute arrange various programs such as dance, drama festivals, music, film festivals workshops, exhibitions, etc. The institute is well known, mostly for its various programs that are staged monthly.

=== World Theater Day Celebration ===
Every year 27 March is celebrated as World Theatre Day since 1962 by the centres of the International Theatre Institute, following the organization's decision of the previous year. In 2013, a similar program was organized at Theatre Institute Chattagram.
