= ATN Bangla =

Bangladeshi television channel

ATN Bangla এটিএন বাংলা

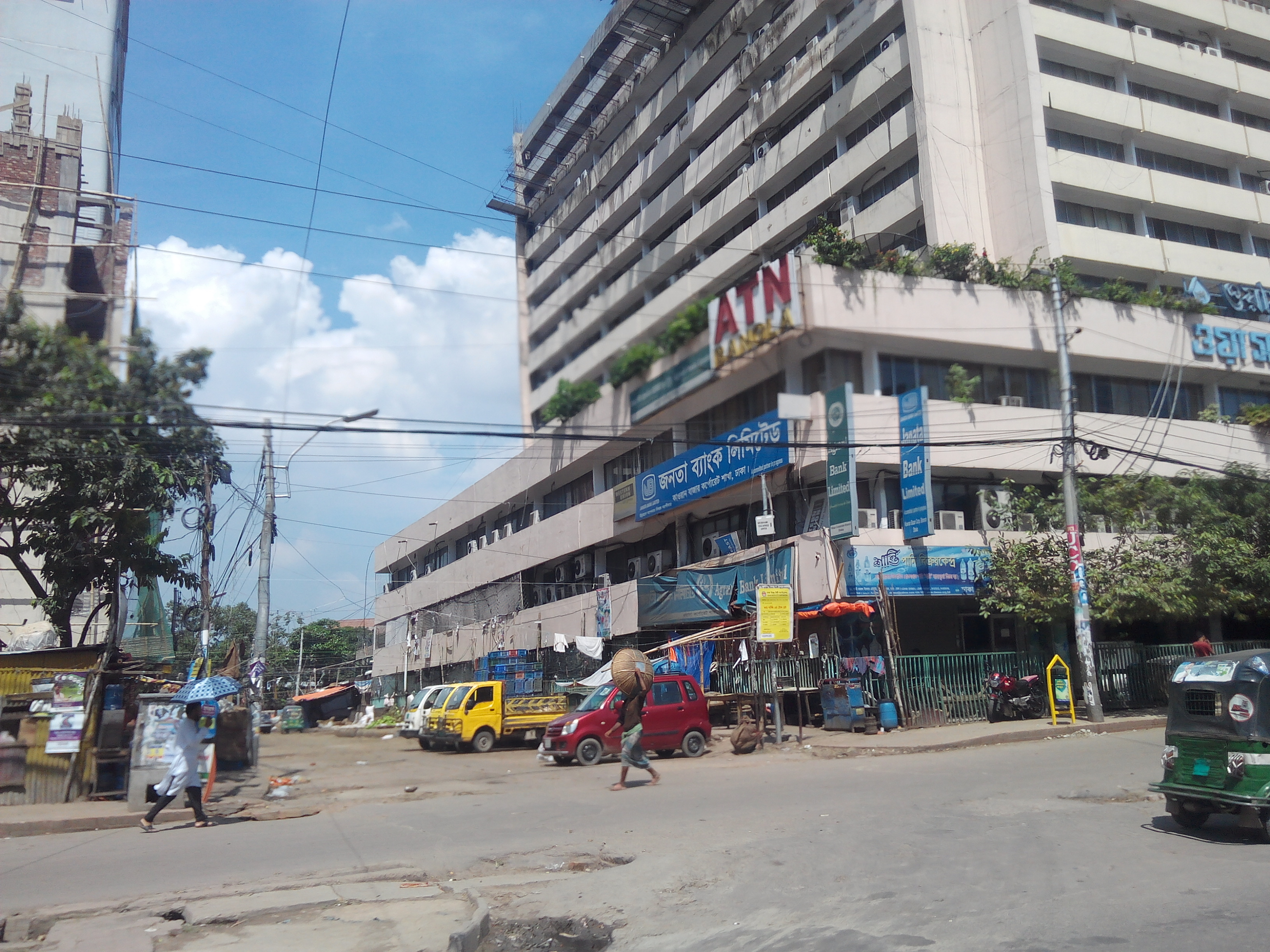
- The headquarters of ATN Bangla in Kawran Bazar
- Country: Bangladesh
- Broadcast area: Worldwide
- Headquarters: Kawran Bazar, Dhaka

Programming
- Language: Bengali
- Picture format: 1080i HDTV (downscaled to 16:9 576i for SDTV sets)

Ownership
- Owner: Multimedia Production Company
- Key people: Mahfuzur Rahman (Managing Director and CEO)
- Sister channels: ATN News

History
- Launched: 15 July 1997; 29 years ago

Links
- Website: ATN Bangla

Availability

Streaming media
- Sling TV: Internet Protocol television

ATN Bangla (Bengali: এটিএন বাংলা), 'ATN' being the acronym of the unused Asian Television Network, is a Bangladeshi Bengali-language satellite and cable television channel owned by Multimedia Production Company. It is based in the Kawran Bazar neighborhood of Dhaka. ATN Bangla is the first privately owned television channel and the first to broadcast on satellite in Bangladesh. The channel began broadcasting on 15 July 1997. ATN Bangla is broadcast in over 130 countries worldwide.

== History ==
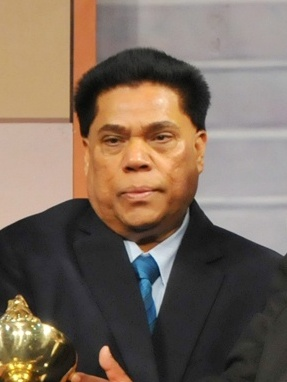
Founder and Managing Mahfuzur Rahman

As nothing of the kind existed in the country at the time, Mahfuzur Rahman had plans to establish a privately owned satellite television channel in Bangladesh, after seeing the popularity of Zee TV in India. He later rented a one-hour slot to broadcast Bengali-language programs on ATN Music, a Mumbai-based television channel, which gained popularity. After ATN Music was shut down, Rahman thought of establishing a full-fledged Bengali-language satellite television channel.

ATN Bangla was the first Bangladeshi privately owned television channel to officially gain a license to broadcast. It officially began broadcasting using a Thaicom satellite on 15 July 1997, with the "Obiram Banglar Mukh" (অবিরাম বাংলার মুখ; lit. 'The face of eternal Bengal') slogan. It is also the first Bengali-language television channel in the world to broadcast worldwide. The name of the channel, ATN Bangla, was also derived from the defunct Indian channel.

The channel broadcast commercials from advertisers that could not advertise on Bangladesh Television due to a strict policy on advertising on the network. Aside from Bangladesh, the channel became popular among Bengali-speaking people in India as well. ATN Bangla had a sister channel known as ATN World, which was devoted solely to Indian-produced programming. ATN World began test transmissions in November 1999. ATN Bangla came under fire in India for its tobacco advertisements, which led to its replacement with a new channel named ATN Kolkata in November 2001 for West Bengal audiences.

ATN Bangla began using digital technology to broadcast, moving away from analog technology, in May 1999. ATN Bangla began broadcasting Bengali-language news programming on 16 August 2001. It later began airing English-language news programming on 1 October 2002. Naem Nizam was the first news editor of ATN Bangla. The channel was heavily praised for its coverage of the Iraq War in 2003. It also introduced hourly news bulletins during that period.

In March 2004, ATN Bangla began broadcasting in the Americas. On 22 November 2004, ATN Bangla won the International Children's Day of Broadcasting Award at the 32nd International Emmy Awards for its segment, Amrao Pari (We, too, Can). The documentary was shot and directed by eighteen Bangladeshi teenagers, and was focused on the story of Abul Khaer; a 9-year-old boy who stopped a passenger train from approaching a disjointed rail track and prevented a train disaster. The channel had also won several more awards for its news and entertainment programming. ATN Bangla was launched in Canada on 19 October 2005 by Asian Television Network, which later lost the rights of airing programming from the Bangladeshi ATN Bangla. Thus, the Canadian ATN Bangla no longer has any connection with the Bangladeshi channel.

In 2007, Doll's House, the first Bangladeshi soap opera targeted towards a female audience, premiered on ATN Bangla. ATN Bangla began airing The Lost World in 2009. On 7 June 2010, ATN Bangla's sister, ATN News, officially began broadcasting. In November 2011, ATN Bangla, along with three other Bangladeshi television channels, signed an agreement with UNICEF to air children's programming for one minute. ATN Bangla received an award for the best entertainment channel of 2013 from the Bangladesh Cable Television Viewers Forum in May 2014. One of its programs, Amra Korbo Joy, was also awarded the best children's show.

On the occasion of the month of Ramadan, ATN Bangla was one of the eight television channels to broadcast the cooking series Pran Premium Ghee Star Cook in July 2014. In November 2015, ATN Bangla was among the channels asked by the information ministry about smoking scenes found in their television series. In June 2018, Dipankar Dipon's directorial debut film; Dhaka Attack, had its world premiere on ATN Bangla. In August 2018, in observance of Eid al-Adha, ATN Bangla aired several Hollywood films dubbed in Bengali, including Titanic. In October 2018, ATN Bangla's Crime Patrol was ranked as the most popular television series in Bangladesh, according to TRP reports.

ATN Bangla began airing the Turkish drama Cennet'in Gözyaşları, with the title being simplified to as Jannat, on 14 October 2018. The channel also began airing the Chinese drama Feather Flies to the Sky in March 2019. ATN Bangla inaugurated two reality shows, South Asian Dance Competition and Agamir Taroka, on 8 June 2020. On 30 March 2022, Family Crisis Reloaded, the second season of Family Crisis which aired on NTV, premiered on ATN Bangla. ATN Bangla won the Best TV Program (Lifestyle) award at the Bangladesh Media Innovation Awards 2022 held in September 2022.

On 5 August 2024, the channel, along with its sister ATN News, went off the air temporarily after its offices in Dhaka were attacked and set on fire by protesters during the non-cooperation movement, shortly after prime minister Sheikh Hasina resigned.

== Programming ==
ATN Bangla is a mixed entertainment television channel. Alongside entertainment and news programming, the channel provides Educational, Sports, Cultural programs, and much more. Religious programming, specifically Islamic, was introduced to the network on 8 September 1998.

== Related services ==
=== ATN Bangla UK ===
In 2001, the channel began broadcasting to the Bangladeshi diaspora in Europe. In June 2005, ATN Bangla was added to Sky Digital in the United Kingdom and Ireland. It was later removed from the platform in May 2006.

In 2016, the channel was reprimanded by British telecom regulator Ofcom due to violations of domestic product placement regulations (which require placements to be "editorially justified", not place "undue prominence", and have on-air disclosure). ATN Bangla attempted to defend the violations by arguing that its local subsidiary did not directly benefit from the placements, as the brands placed do not operate in Europe, but Ofcom still found the channel liable for violations of its broadcasting code.

== Audience share ==
ATN Bangla is one of the leading privately owned television channels in Bangladesh. In 2010, the channel held a total audience share of 36%, tied with Channel i, thus both being the highest. In urban areas, ATN Bangla had an audience share of 61%, and in metropolitan areas, it had a share of 57%. In May 2014, ATN Bangla won the best television channel award in an audience survey organized by the Bangladesh Cable TV Viewers Forum. In the United Kingdom, ATN Bangla was the most watched Asian television channel with an audience share of 0.23% and 0.19% in February and March 2021 respectively.

== See also ==
- List of television stations in Bangladesh
