= BTV News =

BTV's news service

BTV News বিটিভি নিউজ
- Type: Public news channel
- Country: Bangladesh
- Broadcast area: Nationwide
- Headquarters: Rampura, Dhaka

Programming
- Language: Bengali
- Picture format: 1080i HDTV (downscaled to 16:9 576i for SDTV sets)

Ownership
- Owner: Government of Bangladesh
- Parent: Bangladesh Television
- Sister channels: BTV Chittagong; BTV National; Sangsad Television

History
- Launched: 31 December 2024; 21 months ago
- Replaced: BTV World

Links
- Website: btv.gov.bd

Availability

Streaming media
- BTV News Live: www.btvlive.gov.bd/channel/BTV-News

BTV News (Bengali: বিটিভি নিউজ) is a Bangladeshi state-owned Bengali-language news-oriented television channel part of the Bangladesh Television network. The channel commenced transmissions on 31 December 2024 after replacing BTV World. It broadcasts from the BTV Bhaban in Rampura, Dhaka. BTV News broadcasts news programming for 24 hours a day.

== History ==
BTV News began test transmissions on 31 December 2024 at 19:00 (BST) replacing BTV World. It was announced a while before its launch. A day prior, Bangladesh Television was given permission to broadcast a full-fledged news channel. According to press secretary to the chief adviser, Shafiqul Alam, BTV News was launched in order to restructure BTV as a whole as a larger broadcasting outlet.
