= Green TV (Bangladeshi TV channel) =

Green TV গ্রিন টিভি
- Country: Bangladesh
- Broadcast area: Nationwide
- Headquarters: Progoti Sarani, Dhaka

Programming
- Language: Bengali
- Picture format: 1080i HDTV

Ownership
- Owner: Rongdhanu Group

History
- Launched: 19 May 2023; 3 years ago

Links
- Website: greenbd.tv

Availability

Streaming media
- Jagobd: www.jagobd.com/greentv

Green TV (Bengali: গ্রিন টিভি) is a Bangladeshi Bengali-language satellite and cable television channel owned by Green Multimedia Limited, a subsidiary of Rongdhanu Group. The channel commenced transmissions on 19 May 2023 with the "Tomar Chokhe Bissho Dekhi" (তোমার চোখে বিশ্ব দেখি; lit. 'Seeing the world through your eyes') slogan and is based in the Progoti Sarani neighborhood of Dhaka.

== History ==
In November 2013, the Bangladesh Telecommunication Regulatory Commission granted Golam Dastagir Gazi-owned Green Multimedia Limited a license to broadcast a television channel. Later, on 19 May 2023 at 18:00 (BST), the official transmissions of the channel were inaugurated at the International Convention City Basundhara. The speaker of the Jatiya Sangsad, Shirin Sharmin Chaudhury, one of the attendees of the launch ceremony, stated that she believed the channel "would accurately showcase the history of the Liberation War to the youth."

Green TV signed an agreement with the Bangabandhu Sheikh Mujibur Rahman Aviation and Aerospace University on 4 January 2024. On 19 August 2024, the broadcasts of Green TV were temporarily suspended by the Bangladesh Satellite Company Limited due to multiple failures to settle its dues and violations of terms ruled in payment notices. Earlier, its broadcasts were suspended four times after failing to comply with bill payments. Since May 2024, its TRP services were also suspended due to similar reasons. Green TV later signed an agreement with BSCL on 16 October 2025 in order to resume its broadcasts.

== Programming ==
The programming of Green TV includes entertainment shows and movies targeted toward family-oriented audiences. It also broadcasts news programming.

- Balighor
- Egaro Nombor Gari
- Empress Ki (title localized as Shomraggi)
- Shorbojoya
