= BTV Chittagong =

Television station of Bangladesh Television in Chittagong

Bangladesh Television Chattogram; বাংলাদেশ টেলিভিশন চট্টগ্রাম
- Logo of Bangladesh Television Chattogram
- Country: Bangladesh
- Broadcast area: Nationwide
- Headquarters: Pahartali, Chittagong

Programming
- Languages: Bengali; Chittagonian

Ownership
- Owner: Government of Bangladesh
- Parent: Bangladesh Television
- Key people: Nur Anwar Hossain Ranju (General Manager)
- Sister channels: BTV National; BTV News; Sangsad Television

History
- Launched: June 1976; 50 years ago (relay); 19 December 1996; 29 years ago (regional)

Links
- Website: btv.gov.bd

Availability

Terrestrial
- Analog terrestrial: VHF channel 5
- Digital terrestrial: VHF channel 9

Bangladesh Television Chattogram or Bangladesh Television Chittagong, (Note: Bengali: বাংলাদেশ টেলিভিশন চট্টগ্রাম, romanized: Bāṅlādēś Ṭēlibhiśôn Chôṭṭôgrām) branded on-air as BTV Chittagong or BTV Chattogram, (Note: Bengali: বিটিভি চট্টগ্রাম, romanized: BTV Chôṭṭôgrām) sometimes known as CTV, (Note: Bengali: সিটিভি) is a BTV-affiliated television station broadcast from Chittagong, serving southeastern Bangladesh. It is the network's first and currently the only regional television station. It was launched in 1996 and initially broadcast for one and a half hours, but the broadcast schedule significantly increased over time. It broadcasts on a full-day basis daily on both terrestrial and satellite television.

BTV Chittagong started broadcasting on satellite television in 2016. It is also a nationwide terrestrial television station along with BTV Dhaka and Sangsad Television, as it reaches 75% of the area of Bangladesh terrestrially. It is one of the five BTV-affiliated television stations serving the Chittagong Division, with the others being broadcast from Comilla, Noakhali, Rangamati, and Ukhia, all of which are relay television stations.

== History ==
=== 1968–1996: Original plans and relay station ===
Originally, before the independence of Bangladesh and after the inauguration of the second television station of Pakistan Television in Dacca on 25 December 1964, there were initial plans to establish a television station in Chittagong. The station would have operated on VHF channel 5 using an ERP of 30 kilowatts and went on air by December 1968, the same time as the proposed station in Peshawar. The proposed station was later downgraded to a relay one, supposed to broadcast using 10 kilowatts, and its launch date was delayed to June 1970. Stations in Khulna and Rajshahi were also planned. This was delayed again to the end of 1975, a while after the independence of Bangladesh. Prior to the establishment of the full-fledged BTV Chittagong television station, a relay station of BTV Dhaka was inaugurated in Chittagong in June 1976, broadcasting on VHF channel 5 using a 10-kilowatt transmitter, although its ERP was 80 kilowatts. As of August 1989, BTV Chittagong broadcast with an upgraded 15 kilowatt transmitter.

=== 1996–2016: Initial broadcasts ===
On 19 December 1996, Sheikh Hasina, former prime minister of Bangladesh, inaugurated the first regional television station of Bangladesh Television in Chittagong, with financial and technical support from the Government of France. It only broadcast for one and a half hour at the time, within a 40 km limit via terrestrial television. BTV Chittagong was operated via a syndicate and had acquired programs, which were subsequently broadcast on the station. It was also reported that the same artists have constantly been shown on the station. Celebrities have urged the station's authorities to increase its daily schedule to properly showcase the culture, heritage, and the history of the Chittagong region. The authorities of BTV Chittagong were also accused of mismanagement, leading the station to be in disarray. The station's broadcast timing was later extended to two hours a day, and later to three hours.

In January 2009, BTV Chittagong filed a general diary against Ekushey Television for illegally using terrestrial signals for broadcasting in Chittagong, even after the government of Bangladesh ruled that only Bangladesh Television-affiliated stations could broadcast on terrestrial television in Bangladesh. Local police in the city later shut the terrestrial broadcasts on 6 January. Experimental broadcasts on digital terrestrial television from Chittagong commenced on 25 January 2011. Discussions for increasing BTV Chittagong's broadcast schedule took place in 2013, as an objective for the station to broadcast for twenty-four hours. For this, a project costing BDT 440 million had to be initiated.

=== 2016–present: Satellite era ===
On 28 September 2016, BTV Chittagong began experimental broadcasts via satellite television on a four-hour basis. It was later extended to six hours on 31 December 2016. This transmission was also broadcast to 60 countries worldwide. BTV Chittagong also debuted on cable television. On 13 April 2019, BTV Chittagong began broadcasting for nine hours on a daily basis and also commenced transmissions via the Bangabandhu-1 satellite on 1 July 2019. Its broadcast time was later extended to twelve hours in December 2019.

In September 2020, a 133.5 metres (438 ft) tall tower of BTV Chittagong was built. Twelve satellite and cable channels and two terrestrial channels can be operated using the tower, and on 3 September, the transmissions of BTV Chittagong, BTV Dhaka, Sangsad Television, and BTV World commenced using the tower. On 19 December 2020, BTV Chittagong began airing English-language news programming.

On 10 January 2021, BTV Chittagong commenced transmissions for eighteen hours, which is identical to the broadcast timing of BTV Dhaka. In May 2021, BTV Chittagong was made available for streaming worldwide in the newly launched BTV app. On 17 June 2021, BTV Chittagong broadcast its first national debate. On 7 August 2021, the station broadcast live from its studios for the first time. On 19 December 2021, on its 25th anniversary, the station began broadcasting on a full day basis.

On 29 January 2022, BTV Chittagong's former controller and program manager, Mahfuza Akhter, was appointed as BTV Chittagong's new general manager, replacing Nitai Kumar Bhattacharya. On the same day, a Bangabandhu Corner dedicated to the founding father of Bangladesh, Sheikh Mujibur Rahman, was inaugurated at the headquarters of BTV Chittagong. In observance of Eid al-Fitr 2022, the station broadcast the self-produced Anandamela. In May 2022, the Government of Bangladesh ordered the broadcast of BTV Chittagong, along with its sisters, in airports across the country.

On 12 January 2023, Mahfuza Akhter resigned from her position and is succeeded by Nur Anwar Hossain Ranju. In September 2024, a month after the resignation of Sheikh Hasina, Nur Anwar Hossain was accused of alleged irregularities and corruption within the Chittagong station, as well as looting of money. Investigations of those allegations began on 6 January 2026, following the formation of a three-member committee for the task. During his visit to the headquarters of BTV Chittagong, Information and Broadcasting Minister Yasser Khan Choudhury called for the station's authorities to enrich its facilities with advanced digitalized equipment to broadcast "quality programming".

== Programming ==
BTV Chittagong broadcasts local programming, and also programming dedicated to the Indigenous peoples of the Chittagong Hill Tracts. Its programming line primarily consists of news, music, entertainment, and talk shows. It also plays an important role in promoting the culture of the Chittagong region and developing its tourism sector. BTV Chittagong also reserves one hour of its schedule to news programming from the main station in Dhaka.

=== List of original programming ===
- Band Show
- Dwip Darpan
- Ey Shoptaher Shongshkriti
- Eto Shur Eto Gaan
- Grand Studio
- Jaltaranga
- Jugol Bondi
- Ki Prem Shikhayla
- Mukhomukhi
- Music Station
- Pahariya Mon
- Ranna Kothon
- Rupali Fitar Kotha

=== Broadcast time changes ===
Year	Timings
1996	One and a half hour
As of 2008	17:30–19:15 (One hour and forty-five minutes)
September 2016	Four hours
December 2016	17:00–23:00 (Six hours)
April 2019	Nine hours
December 2019	Twelve hours
January 2021	Eighteen hours
December 2021	Twenty-four hours
