= Sangsad Bangladesh Television =

Sangsad Bangladesh Television সংসদ বাংলাদেশ টেলিভিশন
- Logo of Sangsad Bangladesh Television
- Country: Bangladesh
- Broadcast area: Nationwide
- Network: Public
- Headquarters: Rampura, Dhaka

Programming
- Language: Bengali
- Picture format: 1080i HDTV (downscaled to 16:9 576i for SDTV sets)

Ownership
- Owner: Government of Bangladesh
- Sister channels: BTV Chittagong; BTV National; BTV News

History
- Launched: 25 January 2011; 15 years ago

Links
- Website: btvlive.gov.bd/channel/Sangsad-Television

Sangsad Bangladesh Television, (Note: Bengali: সংসদ বাংলাদেশ টেলিভিশন, romanized: Sôṅsôd Bāṅlādēś Ṭēlibhiśôn; Bengali pronunciation: [ˈʃɔŋʃod]) often known as Sangsad Television, (Note: Bengali: সংসদ টেলিভিশন; lit. 'parliament television') branded on-air as Sangsad Bangladesh, (Note: Bengali: সংসদ বাংলাদেশ) is a Bangladeshi state-owned parliamentary television channel, which is the sister of Bangladesh Television. It was launched on 25 January 2011, and broadcasts live from the National Parliament of Bangladesh.

Other than that, a variety of other programs, such as educational and development programs, are broadcast during the channel's last two hours of daily broadcasting. However, in case if there is no parliamentary session, Sangsad Television broadcasts daily from 15:00 to 21:00 (BST). The channel is operated by the Ministry of Information, and is a terrestrial television channel. It is also a free-to-air television channel.

== History ==
On 11 February 2010, Member of Parliament Benzir Ahmed proposed the launch of a television channel named 'Sangsad Bangladesh' for the need to broadcast live parliament sessions to the people.

Sangsad Television commenced a two-hour test broadcast via satellite on 23 January 2011 at 18:00 (BST). It officially began broadcasting on 25 January 2011 on both satellite and digital terrestrial television, after the legislature voted in favor of establishing a channel dedicated to live parliamentary broadcasts, using the facilities of Bangladesh Television. On 9 February 2020, due to technical difficulties, Sangsad Television did not show live parliamentary broadcasts, and instead broadcast music programming that day.

In March 2020, during the COVID-19 pandemic, which caused schools in Bangladesh to shut down, Sangsad Television, along with BTV, began airing educational live lessons for primary and secondary-level students. The channel had become more important for students to learn at home.

In May 2021, Sangsad Television became available to be streamed worldwide, along with its three sister channels, via the BTV app. In May 2022, the government of Bangladesh ordered the broadcast of Sangsad Television, along with its sisters, in airports across the country. After the arson attack at Bangladesh Television's headquarters on 18 July 2024 during the quota reform protests, Sangsad Television temporarily ceased transmissions on that day.

== Programming ==
Sangsad Television mainly broadcasts live broadcasts from the Jatiya Sangsad Bhaban during the evenings. It also sometimes broadcasts the history of the Parliament of Bangladesh and its legislative practices overseas. During the COVID-19 pandemic, Sangsad Television aired live lessons for students with time slots depending on the grade level. The channel uses Bangabandhu-1 for broadcasting on satellite television.
