= Mouchak Market =

Coordinates: 23°48′48″N 90°25′27″E

- Location: Malibag, Dhaka, Bangladesh
- Num. of stores: 1000 shops
- Floors: 5

Mouchak Market is one of the oldest and famous markets in Dhaka city. It was probably situated in the 1940s. It was also one of the most famous markets at the time and was mostly visited by the British and French rulers over Dhaka. It is known to be the General Meeting Building of the Royal British Family.

== Location ==
Accurate position is in Malibagh, Dhaka. But for mass people we can consider it is situated between Siddeshwari and Malibag, which is one of the busiest places in Dhaka city. However, the market is an icon for the area; many people, from Dhaka and outside, recognize the area by 'Mouchak More'.

== Description ==
It is five-storey building. There are fast food shops in the ground floor, jewellery in the 1st floor, plastic and others in the 2nd floor and tri-piece, sharee in the 3rd floor. There is a mosque and a Chinese restaurant (Euro garden) in the 4th floor. Around 3,000 to 4,000 people come to this market every day. But it increases exponentially during the festival Eid-ul-fitr. Every shop here is very profitable.

== Holiday ==
Thursday (full) & Friday (half), Eid-ul-azha (4 days), Eid-ul-fitr (4 days), general assembly and other essential government holidays.

== See also ==
- List of shopping malls in Bangladesh
