= Global Television (Bangladeshi TV channel) =

Bangladeshi satellite television channel

Global Television গ্লোবাল টেলিভিশন

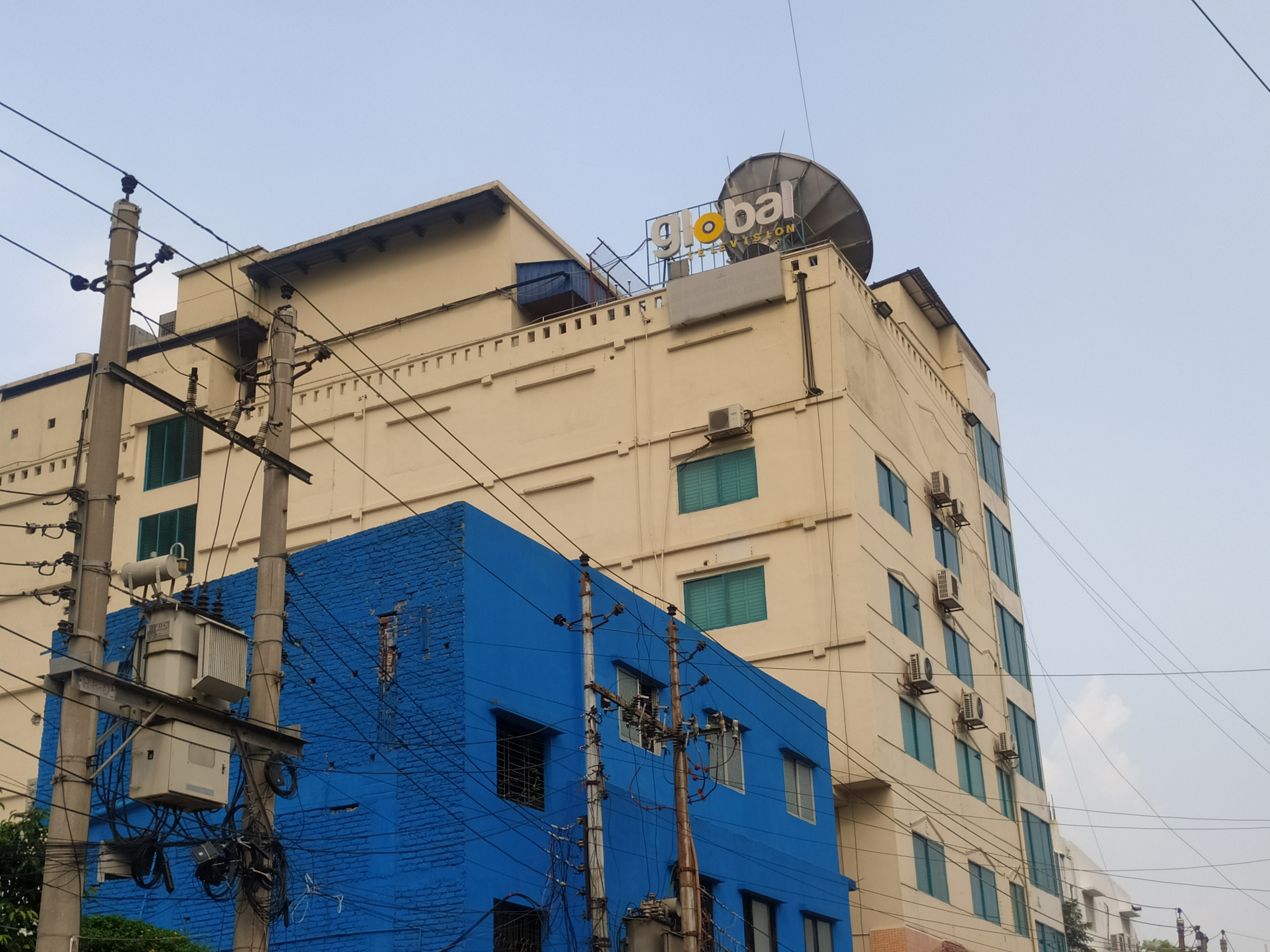
- The headquarter building of Global Television
- Country: Bangladesh
- Broadcast area: Nationwide
- Headquarters: Tejgaon, Dhaka

Programming
- Language: Bengali
- Picture format: 1080i HDTV (downscaled to 16:9 576i for SDTV sets)

Ownership
- Owner: Globe Multimedia Limited
- Key people: Md. Harunur Rashid (chairman); Ahmed Hossain (managing director)

History
- Launched: 30 June 2022; 4 years ago

Links
- Website: www.globaltvbd.com

Availability

Streaming media
- Jagobd: www.jagobd.com/globaltelevision

Global Television (Bengali: গ্লোবাল টেলিভিশন) is a Bangladeshi Bengali-language satellite and cable television channel owned by Globe Multimedia Limited, a subsidiary of Globe Pharma Group of Companies. It commenced official broadcasts on 30 June 2022 with the "Bishwamay Protidin" (বিশ্বময় প্রতিদিন; lit. 'Global everyday') slogan, and is based in Tejgaon, Dhaka. The channel's programming consists of both entertainment and news.

== History ==
Logo used during test transmissions

Then Jatiya Sangsad member Md. Mamunur Rashid Kiron-owned Global Television's license to broadcast was granted by the Bangladesh Telecommunication Regulatory Commission in January 2017. Its frequency allocation was granted in May 2018. Before its launch, Global Television had uploaded its content, including dramas, onto its YouTube channel, which gained one million subscribers by the end of 2021.

On 18 June 2022, journalists working for the channel formed human chains in protest against attacks against journalists. Global Television commenced official transmissions on 30 June 2022 at 16:00 (BST), as the thirty-eighth television channel overall to be launched in Bangladesh. On 24 July 2022, three new drama television series, Monjil, Nirdosh, and Songsar, premiered on Global Television.

On 10 September 2024, the Bangladesh Satellite Company Limited temporarily shut the broadcasts of Global Television down at 14:00 (BST) due to failures in paying dues, as stated in a press release.

== Programming ==
- Ahladi Ahar
- Monjil
- Nirdosh
- Songsar
- Tilottoma
