= Nexus Television =

Bangladeshi non-fiction television channel

Nexus Television নেক্সাস টেলিভিশন
- Country: Bangladesh
- Broadcast area: Nationwide
- Headquarters: Gulshan, Dhaka

Programming
- Language: Bengali
- Picture format: 1080i HDTV (downscaled to 16:9 576i for SDTV sets)

Ownership
- Owner: S. Alam Group of Industries
- Key people: Mohammad Sanaullah (CEO)

History
- Launched: 30 July 2021; 5 years ago
- Former names: Rangdhanu Television (prelaunch)

Links
- Website: www.nexusbd.tv

Nexus Television (Bengali: নেক্সাস টেলিভিশন) is a Bangladeshi Bengali-language satellite and cable infotainment television channel owned by S. Alam Group of Industries. It was launched on 30 July 2021 as the country's first non-fiction infotainment television channel. Unlike other television channels in Bangladesh, the channel does not air drama, movies, and news programming.

== History ==
In November 2013, Nexus Television was initially licensed by the Bangladesh Telecommunication Regulatory Commission as Rangdhanu Television (Bengali: রংধনু টেলিভিশন; lit. 'rainbow'). After receiving a frequency allocation to broadcast in January 2015, it began experimental broadcasts using that name in December 2019 via the Bangabandhu-1 satellite, which went for twenty-four hours a day. It had also originally planned to commence transmissions by the next few months. Later, Rangdhanu Television was renamed to its current name in 2020.

Nexus Television officially began broadcasting on 30 July 2021 at 18:00 (BST), with the "Jiboner Bondhon" (জীবনের বন্ধন; lit. 'The bond of life') slogan. In its launch, Bangladesh's Minister of Information, Hasan Mahmud, has stated that the channel will "play an important role in building Bangabandhu's dream of a golden Bengal under prime minister Sheikh Hasina."

Nexus Television was the broadcasting partner of the 2020 Anannya Top Ten Awards, held on 28 December 2021. During the International Women's Day on 8 March 2022, Nexus Television organized the 'Women Entrepreneur Fair' held for two days in its headquarters in Gulshan, and was broadcast live on the channel.

== Programming ==
As an infotainment television channel, Nexus Television mainly consists of documentaries, programming regarding current affairs, empowerment of women, the struggle of Bangladeshis, the prosperity of the country, the youth, and many more.

=== List of programming ===
- Amar Ghor
- Amar Social Media
- Bizweek
- Cut Uncut
- Daniel's Show
- Darai Nijer Paye
- Islami Jibon Bidhan
- Kemon Achen
- Kontho Charo Jore
- Ladies Club (1 November 2021–present)
- SatDin
- Star Mom
- The Industry
- Tumi Prothom
