= Channel 16 (Bangladesh) =

Defunct Bangladeshi music channel

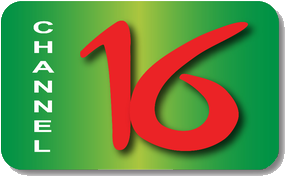
- Country: Bangladesh
- Headquarters: Karwan Bazar, Dhaka

Programming
- Language: Bengali
- Picture format: 576i SDTV

Ownership
- Owner: Insight Telecast

History
- Launched: 16 December 2011; 14 years ago
- Closed: 2 December 2014; 11 years ago

Links
- Website: channel-16tv.com

Channel 16 (Bengali: চ্যানেল সিক্সটিন; in reference to 16 December) was a Bangladeshi Bengali-language satellite and cable music-oriented television channel owned and operated by Insight Telecast. The channel was permitted to broadcast via a Singaporean satellite and officially began broadcasting on 16 December 2011. It was ordered to be shut down by Bangladesh Telecommunication Regulatory Commission on 2 December 2014.

It was the first and the sole music channel in Bangladesh until the launch of Gaan Bangla in 2013. Channel 16's managing director was K G Muheet, who had requested the government to let him run a downlinked privately owned satellite television channel in 2008. Despite only being allowed to broadcast from abroad, Channel 16 illegally broadcast from Dhaka, and even via the Israel-based RRsat satellite. Although defunct on linear television, the channel has currently been streaming online through Twitch.

== Closure order ==
After its license for test broadcasting expired on 30 November 2013, being left unrenewed since then, the Bangladesh Telecommunication Regulatory Commission obliged Channel 16 to cease all transmissions by 2 December 2014. Prior to this, in July 2014, the Association of Television Channel Owners sent a letter to the Ministry of Information and Broadcasting demanding Channel 16 be taken off the air, accusing the channel of violating government regulations.

However, by that point, it illegally continued broadcasting by ceasing to identify itself as Channel 16 and began using the letter 'k' as its on-screen bug, and later began identifying itself as 'MB', or sometimes 'Music Bangla', along with its on-screen bug involving a clock. It has also been accused of broadcasting while evading government fees and alleged forgery of signature when they sent a letter to the ministry which allegedly had the name and forged signature of Dhaka Zilla Council administrator Hasina Doula, who denied connections with the channel.

== Programming ==
=== List of programming ===
- Alapcharita
- Band Hour
- Bondhu Amar
- By Demand
- Dhamaka 16
- Eito Cinemar Gaan
- Khosh Golpo
- Love Song
- Muslim Rangapori Bhalo Lagar Gaan
- Naṭoker Gaan
- Solo Tune
- Sure Sure Bangladesh
- Surer Oikkoṭan
- Suresh Romnopali Fita
- Tenida
- Top Ten
- Young Star Dhamaka
