= Star News (Bangladesh) =

Star News স্টার নিউজ
- Country: Bangladesh
- Broadcast area: Nationwide
- Headquarters: NGI House, Tejgaon Industrial Area, Dhaka

Programming
- Language: Bengali
- Picture format: 1080i HDTV (downscaled to 16:9 576i for SDTV sets)

Ownership
- Owner: Nabil Group of Industries
- Key people: Moksedul Kamal (CEO)

History
- Launched: 20 January 2026; 7 months ago

Links
- Website: starnews.com.bd

Star News (Bengali: স্টার নিউজ) is a Bangladeshi Bengali-language privately owned 24-hour news television channel owned by Nabil Group of Industries. It commenced transmissions on 20 January 2026. The channel is headquartered in the NGI House at the Tejgaon Industrial Area of Dhaka. Moksedul Kamal is the chief executive officer, and senior journalist Waliur Rahman Miraj is the head of news of Star News.

== History ==
Star News began test broadcasts on 3 June 2025. Its web portal was officially launched on 1 January 2026. The official broadcasts of the channel were inaugurated on 20 January 2026 at the NGI House at 19:00 (BST), as the tenth news-oriented television channel to be launched in Bangladesh and the first using a complete automation system through Aveco.

== Programming ==
Star News has a variety of programming related to news and current affairs. Besides news bulletins, it broadcasts talk shows, analytical programs on current affairs, and programming related to covering politics, economy, society, sports, entertainment, technology, and others.

=== List of programing ===
- Star Play
