= CSB News =

Defunct Bangladeshi news channel

- Country: Bangladesh
- Broadcast area: Nationwide
- Headquarters: Syed Grand Center, Uttara, Dhaka

Programming
- Language: Bengali

Ownership
- Owner: Focus Multimedia Limited

History
- Launched: 9 April 2007; 19 years ago
- Closed: 6 September 2007; 19 years ago

Links
- Website: csbnews24.com

CSB News (Bengali: সিএসবি নিউজ), acronym of Chrono Satellite Broadcast, was a Bangladeshi satellite and cable news-oriented television channel, being the first, albeit short-lived, of its kind, owned by QC Group, through its subsidiary Focus Multimedia Limited. The channel commenced operations on 9 April 2007, and headquartered in the Uttara neighborhood of Dhaka. It later ceased broadcasting on 6 September 2007.

== History ==
=== First launch and closure (2007) ===
Focus Multimedia Limited applied for a license to operate CSB News in July 2006, which was at the time known as Focus TV. After being approved in October 2006, during the last few moments of the BNP–led government, it commenced test broadcasts between 21 February and 24 March 2007. CSB News was later officially launched on 9 April of the same year, with the help of Indian media company Mediaguru. On 23 August 2007, the Ministry of Information and Broadcasting warned CSB News and Ekushey Television from airing any news reports, documentaries, talk shows, and discussions against the government.

Later, on 6 September 2007, the Bangladesh Telecommunication Regulatory Commission visited the headquarters of CSB News and shut the channel down at approximately 18:00 (BST). According to officials, the channel was shut down due to "forgery" as it was found that a fake application was submitted to the Ministry of Information and Broadcasting before getting its frequency allocation, two days prior to submitting the original one on 19 October 2006. It was also found that the signature on the approval letter submitted by CSB News was forged, as the ministry stated that they had not issued any letter to the channel. This was pointed out by a probe body of the Ministry of Information which had suggested the government cancel the frequency allocation of CSB News in August 2007. Its no-objection certificate was also allegedly forged.

The BTRC ordered the channel to respond within a week, keeping the channel off-air during that period. Despite this, Reporters Without Borders protested against the closure of the channel. On 9 February 2009, the High Court issued a ruling to the BTRC and the government demanding reasons why the revocation of the license of CSB News should not be considered "illegal". Its license was revoked by the government nevertheless. After its closure, Bangladesh would not see the launch of another news-oriented television channel until 7 June 2010, when ATN News began operations.

=== Tentative relaunch ===
Shortly after the fall of prime minister Sheikh Hasina's government, on 8 August 2024, Dhaka Reporters Unity demanded immediate reinstatement of all unjustly closed media outlets in Bangladesh, including CSB News. Later on 23 September 2024, the High Court suspended the effectiveness of the letters issued by the government which shut CSB News down, allowing the channel to return to the air, following a petition filed by the channel's leader Fayyaz Quader Chowdhury. He later set the proposed relaunch date of the channel on 6 September 2026, nearly two decades after it was shut down.
