= Rampura Thana =

Thana in Dhaka North City Corporation, Bangladesh

Rampura Thana রামপুরা থানা
- Thana
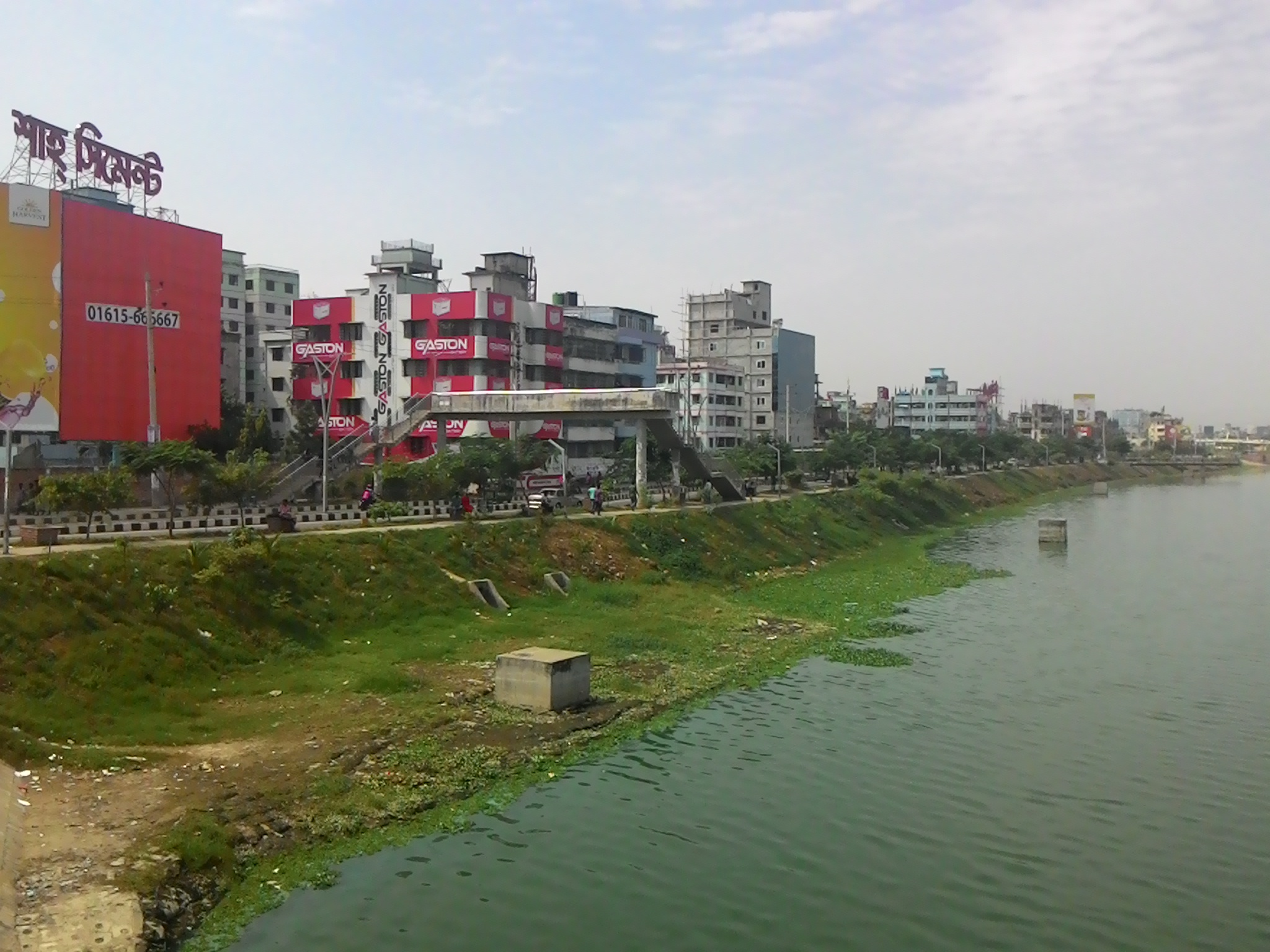
- Rampura in 2019
- Expandable map of vicinity of Rampura Thana
- Location of Rampura Thana within Dhaka Location of Rampura Thana within Dhaka Division Location of Rampura Thana within Bangladesh
- Coordinates: 23.76124°N 90.4207°E
- Country: Bangladesh
- Division: Dhaka Division
- District: Dhaka District
- Established as a thana: 2009

Area
  - Total: 2.8 km^{2} (1.1 sq mi)
- Elevation: 23 m (75 ft)

Population (2022)
  - Total: 160,812
  - Density: 80,028/km^{2} (207,270/sq mi)
- Time zone: UTC+6 (BST)
- Postal code: 1219
- Area code: 02

Rampura Thana (Bengali: রামপুরা থানা) is a police administrative area (thana) of Dhaka, Bangladesh. It encloses parts of Banasree residential area and Dhaka North City Corporation wards 22 and 23. The major thoroughfare DIT Road passes through this area and connects it to Badda, Ramna and Motijheel thanas.

== History ==
In 1975, the headquarters of Bangladesh Television was constructed in Rampura, and the network officially moved its offices and studios from the DIT Bhaban that year. It is the site of GSK Dhaka Half Marathon, sponsored by GSK pharmaceuticals and is a popular marathon in Bangladesh. Rampura KC is the local football club of Rampura and it plays in the Dhaka City Corporation Pioneer Football League. The club qualified for Third Division Football League after a good performance in the Pioneer League in 2008.

== Geography ==
Rampura Thana has an area of 2.80 km^{2}. It has 17 mahallas and mouzas. It borders Gulshan Thana and Badda Thana in the north, Khilgaon Thana in the east and Shahjahanpur Thana in the south. In the west, it borders Ramna Thana and Tejgaon Industrial Area Thana. There is also a slum in the thana called Rampura Slum.

The Rampura canal serves as the primary drainage system for eastern Dhaka, facilitating the discharge of rainwater and industrial effluents from the region with the help of a storm water pump. Over time, it has faced challenges related to encroachment and unauthorized land occupation. During the rainy season, it also serves as a transportation route for the conveyance of vegetables and fruits into Dhaka. Rampura has a number of housing projects including Jahurul Islam City (Aftabnagar) housing project and Banasree housing project, both developed by Eastern Housing Limited, which has been accused of filling the canal to increase their land holdings.

== Demographics ==
Religions in Rampura Thana (2022)
Religion	Percent
Islam	97.13%
Hinduism	2.70%
Other or not stated	0.17%

According to the 2022 Bangladeshi census, Rampura Thana had 41,308 households and a population of 160,814. 6.90% of the population were under 5 years of age. Rampura had a literacy rate (age 7 and over) of 88.73%: 89.92% for males and 87.33% for females, and a sex ratio of 116.15 males for every 100 females.

According to 2011 Census of Bangladesh, Rampura Thana has a population of 224,079 with average household size of 4.5 members, and an average literacy rate of 78.7% vs national average of 51.8% literacy. There are a number of garment factories in the thana, that have been sites of labour unrest. It is characterized as a neighborhood with relatively low crime rates within Dhaka City.

== Education ==
=== Colleges ===
- Taltala City College
- City Dental College
- Rampura Ekramunnesa High School and College
- Rajdhani Ideal School & College
- Ideal School & College
- National Ideal School & College.
- Oxford International School, Banasree Campus
- Basic Ideal School & College

=== Secondary schools ===
- Malibagh Chowdhury Para Govt
- Shahid Faruq Iqbal Girls High School
- Proshika School
- Chowdhury Para Madrasa
- Purbo Rampura High School

== See also ==
- Thanas of Bangladesh
- Thana Nirbahi Officer
- Upazila
- Districts of Bangladesh
- Divisions of Bangladesh
- Administrative geography of Bangladesh
