= Bangladesh Satellite Company Limited =

Bangladesh government-owned company

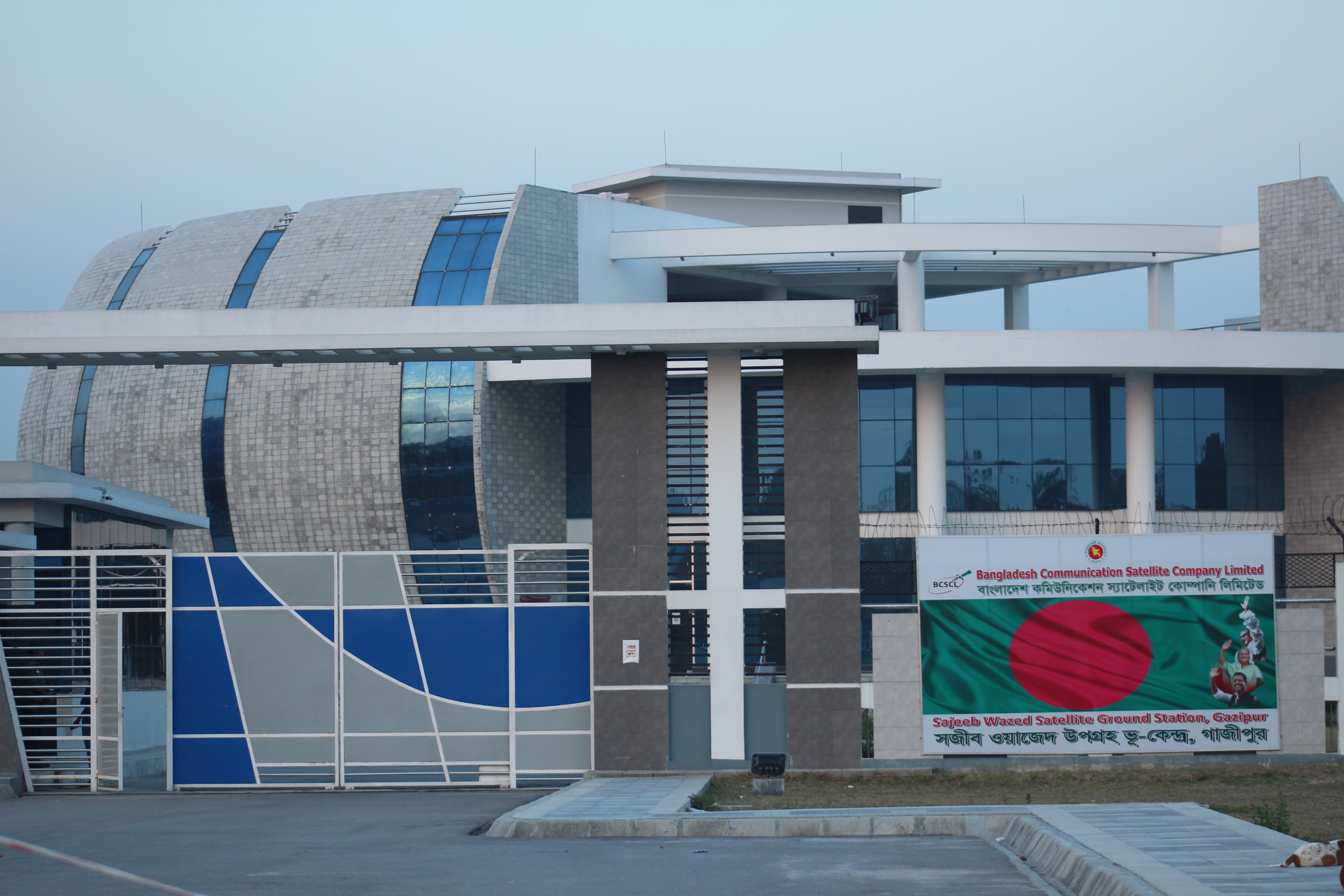
- Bangladesh Satellite Primary Ground Control Station
- Formation: 2017
- Headquarters: Dhaka, Bangladesh
- Region served: Bangladesh
- Official language: Bengali, English
- MD & CEO: Imadur Rahman
- Website: www.bscl.gov.bd

Bangladesh Satellite Company Limited (BSCL) is a Bangladesh Government owned company formed with the aim to operate the country's first satellite, the Bangladesh Satellite-1.

== History ==
Bangladesh Satellite Company Limited was established on 15 August 2017. The company had been authorized a capital of 50 billion BDT and paid capital of five billion BDT. The decision to form the company was approved at a Cabinet of Bangladesh meeting in July 2017. The company is managed by SPARRSO which is the national space agency of Bangladesh. Currently there are in total 35 employees including Managing Director & Company Secretary. The Bangladesh Satellite-1 was launched in a joint collaboration with French company, Thales Alenia Space. It is the first satellite owned and operated by Bangladesh. Thales Alenia Space has built ground control stations in Gazipur and Rangamati Districts for the satellite operation.
