= Bangladesh Satellite-1 =

First Bangladeshi geostationary communications satellite

Bangladesh 1
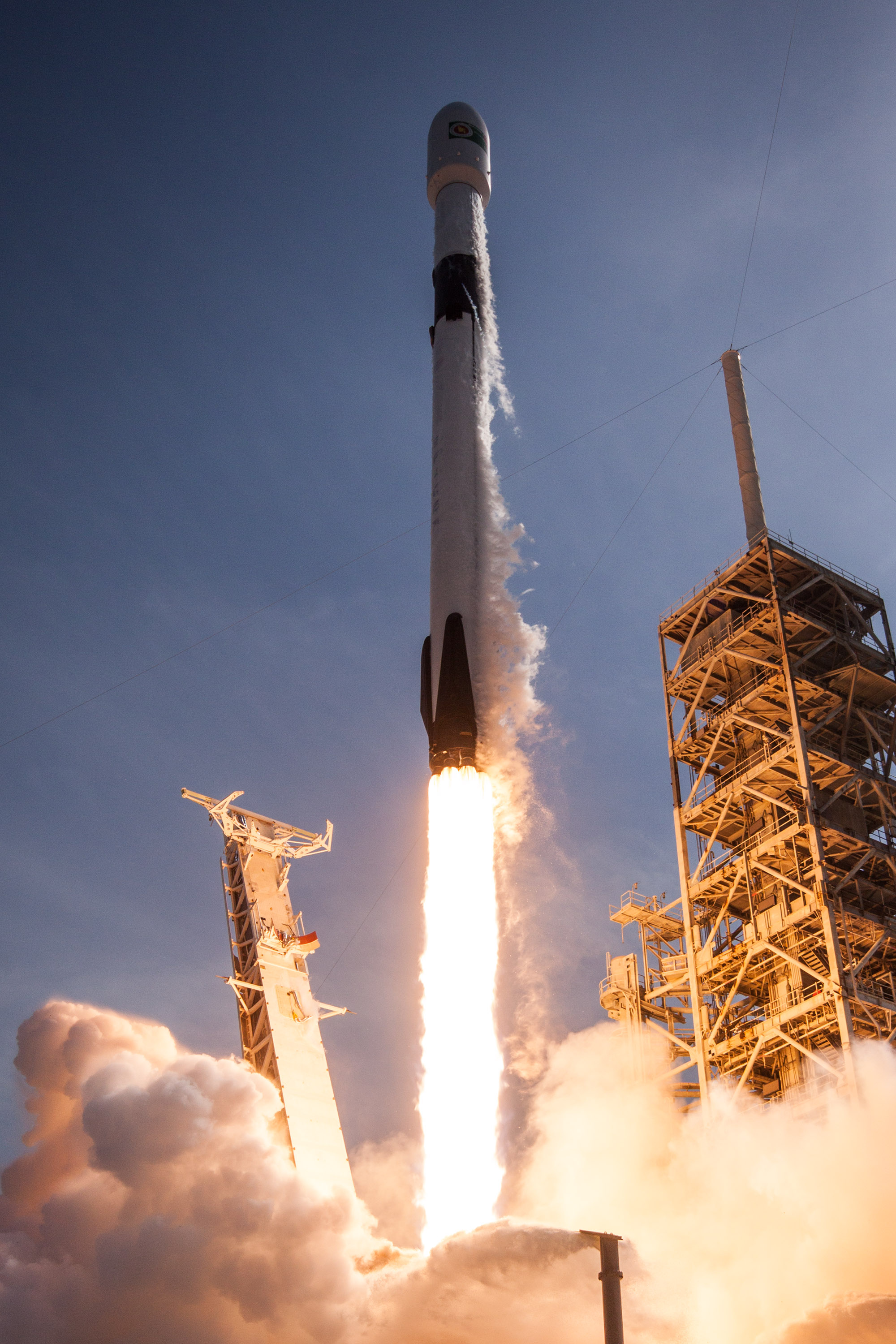
- Launch of Bangladesh-1
- Mission type: Communications and Broadcasting Satellite
- Operator: Bangladesh Communication Satellite Company Limited
- COSPAR ID: 2018-044A
- SATCAT no.: 43463
- Website: Bangladesh Satellite Company Limited, BSCL, Bangladesh Satellite Project
- Mission duration: 15 years

Spacecraft properties
- Bus: Spacebus-4000B2
- Manufacturer: Thales Alenia Space
- Launch mass: ~3,709 kg (8,177 lb)
- Power: 6kW

Start of mission
- Launch date: 12 May 2018, 20:14 UTC
- Rocket: Falcon 9 Block 5 B1046-1
- Launch site: KSC LC-39A
- Contractor: SpaceX

Orbital parameters
- Regime: Geostationary
- Longitude: 119.1°E
- Perigee altitude: 35789.3 km
- Apogee altitude: 35798.5 km
- Period: 1,436.1 minutes
- Velocity: 3.07 km/s
- Epoch: 6 June 2018

Transponders
- Band: 14 C band, 26 K_{u} band
- Bandwidth: 36MHz

The Bangladesh Satellite-1 (BS-1), formerly known as Bangabandhu Satellite-1 (BS-1) is the first Bangladeshi geostationary communications and broadcasting satellite. It was manufactured by Thales Alenia Space and launched on 12 May 2018 from Kennedy Space Center, USA. The satellite was the first payload launched by a SpaceX Falcon 9 Block 5 launch vehicle. With the launch, Bangladesh became the 57th country to independently operate a satellite in space.

== Background and history ==
The project was implemented by the Bangladesh Telecommunication Regulatory Commission (BTRC), which worked with US-based Space Partnership International, LLC. The government-owned Bangladesh Communication Satellite Company Limited (BCSCL) was established to operate the satellite and was subsequently renamed Bangladesh Satellite Company Limited (BSCL).

The satellite expands Ku-band and C-band coverage over all of Bangladesh and its nearby waters including the Bay of Bengal, Nepal, Bhutan, Sri Lanka, the Philippines, eastern Indian states (West Bengal, Assam, Meghalaya, Mizoram, Tripura, Nagaland, Arunachal Pradesh) and Indonesia.

Bangladesh Satellite-1 (BS-1) was initially planned to be launched on an Arianespace Ariane 5 ECA rocket on 16 December 2017 to celebrate the Victory day of Bangladesh. Following the lack of firm guarantee from Arianespace for that date, BTRC instead chose the Falcon 9 launch vehicle. The satellite is now located at the 119.1° East longitude geostationary slot.

After the fall of the Sheikh Hasina led Awami League government, Bangabandhu Satellite-1 was renamed to Bangladesh Satellite-1.

== Construction ==
Bangladesh-1 was designed and manufactured by Thales Alenia Space. The total cost of the satellite was projected to be 248 million US dollars in 2015 (Tk 19.51 billion), financed via a $188.7 million loan from HSBC Holdings plc. The satellite carries a total of 40 Ku-band and C-band transponders with a capacity of 1600 megahertz and a predicted life span to exceed 15 years.

== Map of satellite's position ==
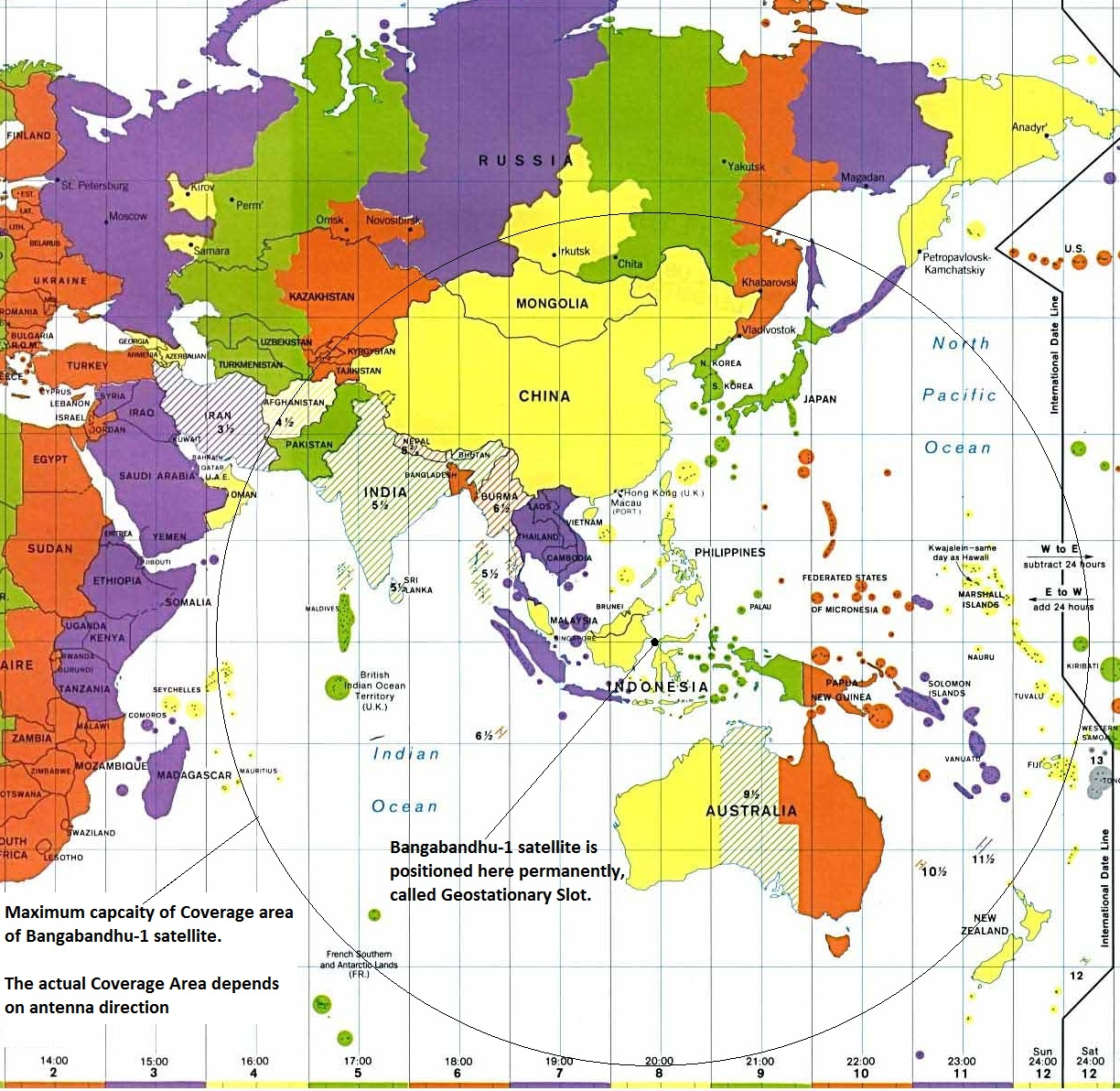
Bangladesh Satellite-1 position and its coverage area 119.1°E.

== Launch ==
Bangladesh Satellite-1 was launched at 20:14 UTC on 12 May 2018, on a SpaceX Falcon 9 launch vehicle at the Kennedy Space Center, USA. It was the first payload to be launched using the new SpaceX Block 5 model of the rocket.

The satellite was originally planned to launch on 10 May 2018, however the rocket triggered an automatic abort as it entered the startup phase of terminal count at T-58 seconds. The rocket launch was pushed back 24 hours, and it was finally launched on 12 May 2018.

== Operation ==
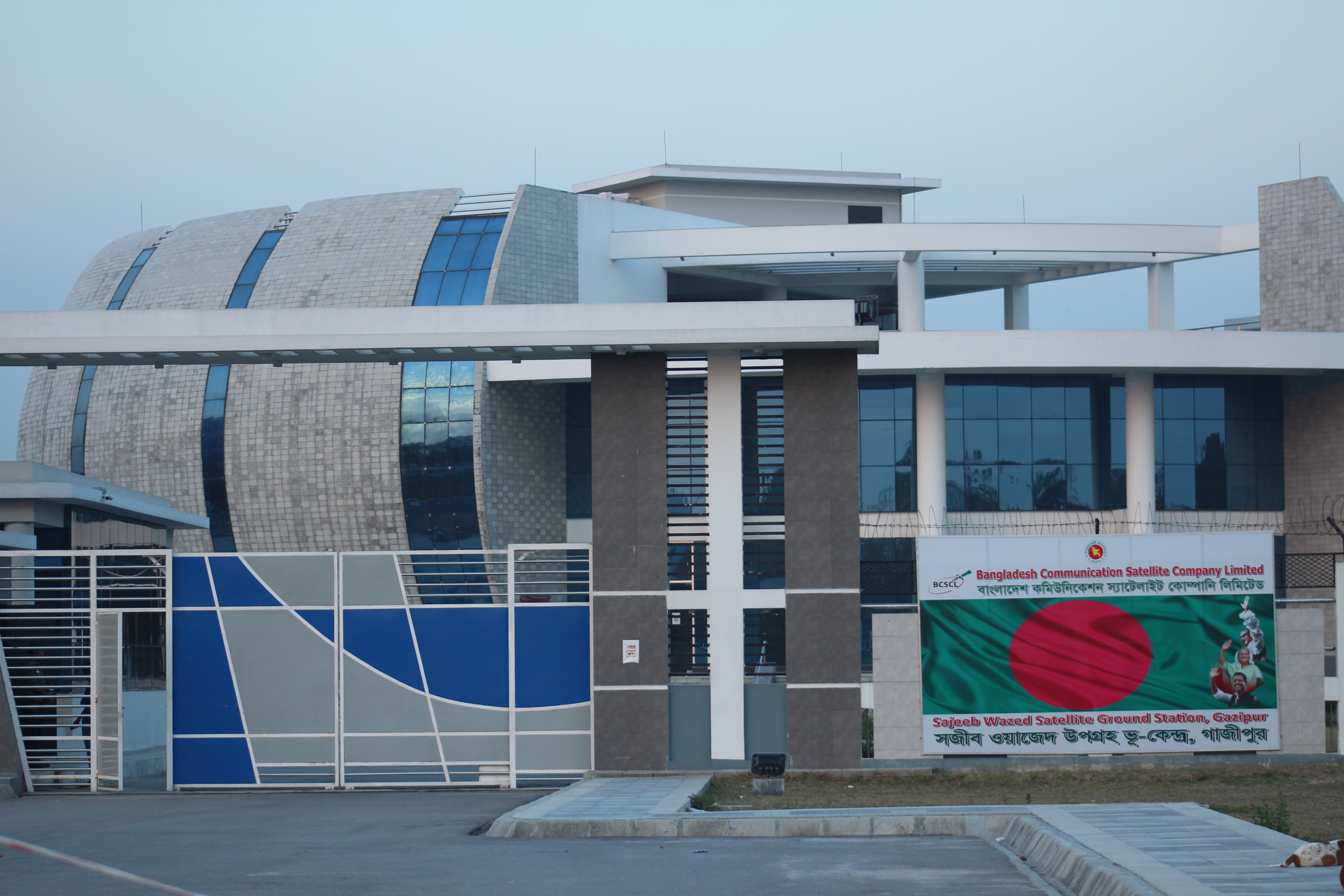
Bangabandhu 1 satellite ground station at Gazipur

The satellite uses ground control stations built by Thales Alenia Space with its partner Spectra primary ground station in Gazipur. Secondary ground station is at Betbunia, Rangamati The first test signal after launch was received by the operators on 12 May 2018.

== See also ==
- List of radio stations in Bangladesh
- Mass media in Bangladesh
- Telecommunications in Bangladesh
