= Jatrabari Police Station =

Police precinct in Dhaka, Bangladesh

Coordinates: 23°42′37″N 90°26′08″E

- যাত্রাবাড়ী থানা
- Interactive map of the Jatrabari Police Station area

Website
- DMP Official Website

Jatrabari Police Station is a police precinct under the jurisdiction of the Dhaka Metropolitan Police located in the southern part of Dhaka, Bangladesh. It is responsible for maintaining law and order, crime prevention, and traffic management within the densely populated areas around Jatrabari. The station was heavily damaged in attacks following the fall of the Sheikh Hasina-led Awami League government.

== History ==
Jatrabari Police Station was established as part of the expansion of Dhaka Metropolitan Police to ensure better law enforcement coverage in the southern parts of the city. The station was established 2007 following a proposal of State Minister for Home Affairs Lutfozzaman Babar of the Bangladesh Nationalist Party government to split the Demra Police Station in two.

=== 2024 protests and attack on the station ===
On 5 August 2024, Jatrabari Police Station was the epicentre of a violent confrontation between law enforcement and anti-government protesters during protests against the Sheikh Hasina-led Awami League government. The event occurred amid widespread unrest following reports that Prime Minister Hasina had fled the country in the face of a mass uprising. Following the fall of the Hasnia-led government on 5 August 2024, over 500 police stations across Bangladesh were reportedly attacked.

Thousands of protesters gathered at the Jatrabari intersection, attempting to march toward the Prime Minister’s official residence, Gono Bhaban. Police forces responded with live ammunition, tear gas, and rubber bullets. Eyewitness accounts reported indiscriminate police firing, resulting in at least 30 deaths, although the final death toll has not been confirmed.

A dramatic account from a detainee named Sakhawat, who was in the police station's lock-up, revealed the events unfolding inside the station. According to him, officers repeatedly reloaded Chinese-made Type 56 rifles and fired from within the premises. By 4 p.m., protesters overwhelmed the station, torching the premises and surrounding vehicles. Six policemen were reportedly killed in the ensuing violence, and the station was largely destroyed. The next day four burned bodies were recovered from the station.

This incident marked one of the bloodiest days of the 2024 uprising and highlighted the volatile relationship between citizens and law enforcement during the Bangladesh post-resignation violence (2024–present). While conducting a search at a hotel in Dhaka’s Jatrabari on August 14, three youths were accused of gang-raping a woman and were subsequently beaten—two fatally—by student vigilantes who had taken over the police station. The incident occurred in the aftermath of the anti-government uprising that ousted the Awami League, with conflicting claims emerging over whether the rape allegation was fabricated for political retaliation. Multiple videos and witness testimonies show the woman accusing the youths, who also appeared to confess during beatings, while families of the deceased claim they were falsely framed due to their involvement in the uprising. The two were included in a list of martyrs by July Shaheed Smrity Foundation and their families received 1 million BDT from the foundation.

=== Aftermath ===
The six-storey building sustained extensive damage, and all seven of its official vehicles were destroyed. Police operations were temporarily relocated to Demra Police Station, but resumed at the original site in early October despite ongoing renovations. The destruction caused by arson left the station with significant operational challenges. The number of active staff dropped from 258 before August—including 206 police officers and 52 Ansar members—to around 150 as of late October. Burnt vehicles remained on-site, while the station operated with only one new patrol car and two borrowed vehicles from Tejgaon Police Station, both of which frequently malfunctioned.

According to Officer-in-Charge (OC) Faruk Hossain, services are being provided despite critical shortages in personnel, equipment, and mobility. Sub-Inspector Sakhayet Hossain, then acting as a duty officer, reported that the station had only one functioning computer and that delays in filing general diaries are common. All case records were lost in the fire, making it difficult to identify warrant-listed suspects and pursue criminal investigations. Officers report a rise in petty crimes such as mugging and theft in the Jatrabari area. Despite these setbacks, police sources say efforts are underway to restore full functionality to the station, with new furniture being installed and infrastructure repairs in progress.

=== Movement related cases ===
On 5 March 2025, a Dhaka court ordered the arrest of nine individuals in connection with murder and attempted murder cases filed at various police stations, including Jatrabari Police Station. These cases are linked to the unrest surrounding the Anti-discrimination Student Movement. Those shown arrested include former law minister Anisul Huq, former shipping minister Shajahan Khan, former LGRD and cooperatives minister Md Tajul Islam, former state minister for industries Kamal Ahmed Majumder, former Dhaka North City Corporation mayor Atiqul Islam, and former Dhaka-7 MP Mohammad Solaiman Salim. Additionally, journalist couple Farzana Rupa and Shakil Ahmed, along with former Jatrabari Police Station officer-in-charge Abul Hossain, were also named in the court orders. Abul Hossain was detained from Teknaf, Cox’s Bazar District in September 2024.

Anisul Huq, Shajahan Khan, and Atiqul Islam were specifically shown arrested in separate murder cases filed with the Jatrabari Police Station. Journalist couple Rupa and Shakil were similarly named in two murder cases also filed at the same station. Former Jatrabari OC Abul Hossain was shown arrested in two cases—one for murder and another for attempted murder.

== Jurisdiction ==
Jatrabari Police Station's jurisdiction includes:

- Jatrabari
- Shonir Akhra
- Dholairpar
- Parts of Demra and Dania

It covers both residential and commercial areas and oversees security at major intersections and transport hubs in southern Dhaka.

== Facilities ==
The police station includes:

- General duty office
- Lock-up and detention area
- Arms and ammunition room
- Officer quarters and administrative offices

== See also ==
- Dhaka Metropolitan Police
- Bangladesh Police
- Gono Bhaban
- Attack on Enayetpur police station
