= 2024 Baniachong police station attack =

July massacre in Habiganj

- Part of July massacre
- Baniachong Police Station (Sylhet division)
- Location: 24.5218°N 91.3689°E; Baniachong, Habiganj, Sylhet, Bangladesh
- Date: August 5, 2024; 2 years ago
- Target: Baniachong Police Station
- Victim: Santosh Chowdhury

The 2024 Baniachong police station attack was a vigilante attack on the Baniachong Police Station in Habiganj District of Sylhet, Bangladesh. The attack occurred on 5 August, the last day of the nationwide mass uprising.

The violence culminated in the lynching of Sub-Inspector Santosh Chowdhury, who was reportedly handed over to protesters by the Bangladesh Army after failed negotiations with the mob.

== Background ==
Baniachong Upazila became a center of unrest amid widespread protests against the Sheikh Hasina-led Awami League government in July–August 2024. On 5 August, students of the Anti-discrimination Student Movement started marching towards the police station from Bara Bazar. They clashed with the police forces after they tried to stop the March. In the clash, six people were killed in police firing. The deaths inflamed tensions, prompting thousands of villagers to march on the police station.

The attack occurred during a period of civil unrest and political turmoil in Bangladesh. A non-cooperation movement was underway against the Sheikh Hasina-led Awami League government, resulting in widespread confrontations between law enforcement and protesters nationwide. Reports indicated that 26 police stations were targeted in coordinated assaults. The attack on Enayetpur police station was part of a broader wave of assaults on law enforcement. The police headquarters reported that other police stations targeted included: Jatrabari Police Station and Khilgaon Police Station in Dhaka Metropolitan Police jurisdiction, Gorai Highway Police Station in Tangail, Sherpur Police Station in Bogra, Joypurhat Sadar Police Station in Joypurhat, Eliotganj Highway Police Station in Comilla, Ashuganj Police Station in Brahmanbaria, Shahjadpur Police Station in Sirajganj. Additionally, the offices of the superintendents of police in Narayanganj, Bogra, Pabna, and Sirajganj were also attacked.

== Attack ==
Following the shooting, protesters surrounded the Baniachong Police Station, trapping more than 50 officers inside. Attempts to control the crowd failed, and protesters looted weapons and set parts of the station ablaze. Smoke and fire engulfed the building, where the officers had taken refuge on the upper floors. Palash Ranjan Dey, Baniachong-Ajmeriganj Additional Police Superintendent, "Agitators suddenly set the station on fire. The incident will be explained in detail later,".

According to survivors, the police expected to be rescued by the army, which arrived later in the day. However, amid ongoing negotiations and rising public anger, Sub-Inspector Santosh Chowdhury was reportedly singled out by the crowd. Eyewitnesses claim he was identified due to his alleged role in the shooting and prior incidents of abuse. He was forcibly taken by protesters, beaten to death within the police compound, and his body was later found hanging from a tree near the station.

=== Victim ===
Sub-Inspector Santosh Chowdhury, the sole fatality among the police, was the only son in his family. He had married ten months before his death, and his wife gave birth to their first child three months after the incident. His family has publicly questioned why military or police authorities did not protect him during the evacuation. Some have accused him of being involved with extortion while locals have stated that he made enemies due to his activities against narcotics trafficking.

== Aftermath ==
The remaining police officers were eventually evacuated to Habiganj under Bangladesh Army escort. No arrests were made immediately after the attack. Md. Rezaul Haque Khan, the newly appointed superintendent of police, visited the damaged building near the end of August.

Reports indicate that police filed a murder case on 22 August 2024, but as of mid-2025, there has been little progress in the investigation, and no suspects have been detained.

The Ministry of Home Affairs had issued a directive in October 2024 limiting law enforcement's ability to pursue charges for incidents that occurred between 15 July and 8 August 2024. Legal experts criticized this as a de facto amnesty for serious crimes, including murder. According to the Interim government, 44 police officers were killed in the protests against Sheikh Hasina. The majority of them were killed on 5 August, the day Prime Minister Sheikh Hasina resigned. The officers killed ranked from Inspector to Constable. There have been reports of a higher death toll being hidden.

In a July 2025 report, BBC Bangla raised allegations that SI Santosh had been specifically targeted. However, it later withdrew the report.

In January 2026, Mahdi Hasan, Habiganj district member secretary of the Students Against Discrimination, was recorded during a confrontation with police at Shaistaganj Police Station boasting about burning of Baniachang Police Station and the killing of SI Santosh during the July revolution.

=== Reactions ===
Legal and human rights experts expressed alarm at the apparent breakdown of law and order. Professor Sheikh Hafizur Rahman Karzon of the University of Dhaka stated that even if the officer had committed wrongdoing, summary execution by mob constitutes a severe erosion of legal norms. Human rights lawyer Alena Khan called for a formal investigation and documentation of the incident.

== See also ==
- Non-cooperation movement (2024)
- Attack on Enayetpur police station
- Law enforcement in Bangladesh
