= Meghna Group of Industries =

Bangladeshi conglomerate

Meghna Group Of Industries
- Type: Private company
- Industry: Conglomerate
- Founded: 1976; 50 years ago in Dhaka, Bangladesh
- Founder: Mostafa Kamal
- Headquarters: Gulshan, Dhaka, Bangladesh
- Key people: Mostafa Kamal (chair and managing director)
- Revenue: ▲৳200 billion US$2.5 billion (2017)
- Number of employees: 35,000 (2020)
- Website: mgi.org

Meghna Group of Industries (MGI; Bengali: মেঘনা গ্রুপ অব ইন্ডাস্ট্রিজ) is a Bangladeshi industrial conglomerate. It has business interests in chemicals, cement, consumer products, real estate, insurance, securities, and utilities, among others.

== History ==
=== 1970s ===
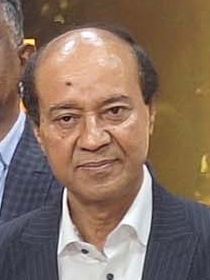
Mostafa Kamal, founder and chairman of the conglomerate

Meghna Group traces its origins to Kamal Trading Company, established in 1976 by Mostafa Kamal. But early in the business poor-quality products were seized by customs, jeopardizing his first venture into small-scale imports.

=== 1980s ===
In 1989, The company established a subsidiary company Meghna Vegetable Oil Industries Limited. Also in 1980s, the company became "Meghna Group" as a group of companies.

=== 1990s ===
In May 1996, the group made its foray into the financial sector by establishing Bangladesh National Insurance Company Limited (BNIC), with Mostafa Kamal assuming the position of chairman.

In 1999, Meghna Group established another subsidiary company to manufacture small bags, United Fibre Industries Limited.

=== 2000s ===
In 2001 Meghna Group established United Feeds Limited to produce poultry feed.

In 2002 Meghna Group established an export-oriented WPP bag manufacturing company Tanveer Polymer Industries Limited. The group added a new plant in 2009, Global AD Star Bag Industries Limited. The group entered into the CNG and Chemical business and established Everest CNG Refueling & Conversion Limited & Tasnim Chemical Complex Limited.

=== 2010s ===
In 2011, Meghna Group founded Meghna Aviation Limited as a helicopter rental service and owns four helicopters.

In June 2013, Kamal bought Ekattor TV's 50% of shares from its founder Mozammel Hossain and entered into the news media business by holding the ownership under Meghna Group. Later the Channel recognized as the fifth biggest publisher of fake news in Bangladesh by Rumor Scanner Bangladesh, a fact-checking organization.

In 2016 Meghna Group planned to build a PVC factory in the country's first private economic zone, Meghna Economic Zone.

In 2017 The Group launched Sonargaon Steel Fabricate Limited.

In March 2018 Meghna Group announced an investment of US$300 million in the Meghnaghat Economic Zone to build eight new manufacturing units. In June, Meghna Sugar Refinery Limited, a sister concern of the Group received an US$82 million loan from a consortium of German Development Finance Institution, FMO, Oesterreichische Entwicklungsbank, and the Islamic Corporation for the Development of the Private Sector. Its factory has 3000 tonnes sugar refine capacity per day.

=== 2020s ===
In March 2021 The Meghna Group of Industries entered the shipping business by launching two oceangoing vessels, MV Meghna Princess and MV Meghna Adventure, with a carrying capacity of 62,500 tonnes each, increasing the size of its fleet to eight vessels.

In August 2021 the Group also entered the ceramic business with the brand Fresh Ceramics under Meghna Ceramic Industries Limited. The group invested around 5 billion taka in building its manufacturing unit at Narayanganj District.

In April 2022 Meghna Group initiated to build of its third economic zone Cumilla Economic Zone with an investment of 1.2 billion BDT(1200 Crore taka) in 350 acres of land.

The group also started construction for its manufacturing unit for rice mill and rice bran oil plant at Bogra District under one of its sister concern, Tanveer Foods Limited in this year. And runs its business by storing 2000 metric tons of paddy with its under-construction manufacturing unit. Thus, the foods were seized by the Directorate General of Food at the end of this year.

In January 2023 Meghna Group plans to establish another rice mill at Bogura District with an investment of 7 billion BDT(7 billion Taka).After July, Rice Bran Oil Plant launched. Later in March, Tanveer Foods Limited (TFL) got an investment of US$35 million from International Finance Corporation (IFC).

In 2023, MGI launched four new oceangoing vessels MV Meghna Victory, MV Meghna Prestige, MV Meghna Hope and MV Meghna Progress, with a carrying capacity of 66000 tonnes each, expanding its fleet size to 22 vessels.

== List of economic zones ==
Meghna Group of Industries (MGI) owned and operated three private economic zones among twenty-nine in Bangladesh under Bangladesh Economic Zones Authority (BEZA).

Sn.	Name	Gazetted on	Land Size	Employment Opportunity	Suitable Industries	Cost of Infrastructure	Location	Authority	Ref.
1	Meghna Economic Zone (MEZ)	18 August 2016	245 acres	20,000+	Pulp & Paper; Tissue, Sanitary Napkin, Baby Diaper, Power Plant, Oil Refinery, Flour Mill, PVC (Resin) Plant, Petrochemicals, Ceramics; LPG plant etc.	175 million USD	Meghna Ghat, Sonargaon, Narayangonj	Bangladesh Economic Zones Authority (BEZA)	BEZA Website
2	Meghna Industrial Economic Zone (MIEZ)	21 September 2017	110 acres	10,000+	Beverage, Food items, Fiber bag, Steel Construction, Plastic, Packaging Film, Pharmaceutical Bottles, Garments Accessories, Plastic items, Chemicals etc.	600 million USD	Tipordi, Mograpara, Sonargaon, Narayangonj	Bangladesh Economic Zones Authority (BEZA)	BEZA Website
3	Cumilla Economic Zone (CEZ)	13 April 2022	245 acres	50,000+		2 billion USD	Meghna Upazila, Cumilla District	Bangladesh Economic Zones Authority (BEZA)	

== Subsidiaries ==
- Fresh (fast moving consumer goods)
- Meghna Vegetable Oil Industries Limited
- Meghna Sugar Refinery Limited
- Meghna Beverage
- Unique Cement Fiber Industries
- Fresh Cement
- Sonargaon Steel Fabricate Limited
- Sonargaon Green Concrete Bricks and Blocks
- Kamal Trading Company
- Fresh Ceramics
- Tasnim Chemical Complex Limited
- Meghna PVC Limited
- Meghna Economic Zone
- Meghna Industrial Economic Zone Limited
- Cumilla Economic Zone
- Everest CNG Refueling & Conversion Limited
- MGI Transport and Logistics
- Fresh LPG
- Meghna Power
- Meghna Pulp & Paper Mills Limited
- Fresh exercise books
- Fresh Paper
- Meghna Ballpen & Accessories Mfg. Limited
- Sonargaon Printing & Packaging Industries Limited
- Meghna Foil Packaging Limited
- Fresh Happy Nappy Diaper
- United Feeds Limited
- Soya Bean & Rape Seed processing plant
- Meghna Seeds Crushing Mills Limited
- United Fibre Industries Limited
- Tanveer Polymer Industries Limited
- Meghna Aviation Limited
- Mercantile Shipping Lines Limited
- Bangladesh National Insurance Company Limited
- Dhaka Securities Limited
- Meghna Hotel and Resorts
- The Central Hospital Limited
- The Barakah General Hospital Limited
- Meghna Information Technology
- Meghna Properties Limited
- Ekkator Television

== See also ==
- List of companies of Bangladesh
