= Md. Afzal Naser =

Md Afzal Naser
- Occupations: Military officer, intelligence official
- Known for: Former DGFI director; role during 2007–08 caretaker government

Md Afzal Naser served as a lieutenant colonel in the Bangladesh Army and was appointed as a director of the Directorate General of Forces Intelligence (DGFI), holding the position from March 2006 to March 2008 during the 2006–2008 Bangladesh political crisis. He is accused of torturing the 11th Prime Minister of Bangladesh Tareque Rahman.

== Early life ==
Naser was born in Senbagh Upazila, Noakhali District.

== Career ==
Naser joined the Bangladesh Army on 4 July 1984.

Naser was the director of the Directorate General of Forces Intelligence (DGFI), serving from March 2006 to March 2008. During this period, Bangladesh was under an army-backed caretaker government following the events commonly referred to as the 2006–2008 Bangladesh political crisis. According to reports, he was considered one of the key actors during this period. Allegations have been made that, during his tenure, he was involved in the torture of political leaders and businessmen in custody.

Naser was dismissed from military service on 5 November 2009 after the Awami League came to power.

== Detention ==
On 30 March 2026, Naser was detained by the Detective Branch of the Dhaka Metropolitan Police from Road No. 12 in Mirpur DOHS, Dhaka, for interrogation. Authorities stated that a decision regarding the specific case under which he would be formally arrested had not yet been made at the time of detention. His detention was reported as part of a series of actions targeting individuals associated with the 2007–08 caretaker government. Earlier, law enforcement had detained the generals Masud Uddin Chowdhury and Sheikh Mamun Khaled in connection with related developments. He was later charged with the death of a protestor against former Prime Minister Sheikh Hasina in July 2024. He was placed in a six-day remand for interrogation by the Dhaka Metropolitan Magistrate, Hasib Ullah Pias.

According to Prosecutor Omar Faruq Faruqi, Naser later served as an administrator at United Hospital and prevented former Prime Minister Khaleda Zia from receiving treatment there. Faruqi described Naser as an associate of former Prime Minister Sheikh Hasina. He is accused of torturing the Prime Minister of Bangladesh Tareque Rahman.
