= Omar Faruq Faruqi =

Bangladeshi lawyer (born 1964)

Omar Faruq Faruqi is a Bangladeshi lawyer and the Dhaka Metropolitan Public Prosecutor. He is a leader of the Bangladesh Jatiyatabadi Ainjibi Oikkya Panel, the pro-Bangladesh Nationalist Party lawyers association. He has represented the state in prosecuting high-profile leaders and affiliates of the deposed Sheikh Hasina-led Awami League government, including journalists.

== Early life ==
Faruqi was born on 1 January 1964.

== Career ==
Faruqi became a member of the Dhaka Bar Association on 1 July 1996. He was the secretary of the Dhaka Bar Association.

In December 2021, Faruqi sued Murad Hassan under the Digital Security Act for making comments against Zaima Rahman, granddaughter of the former prime minister and chairperson of the Bangladesh Nationalist Party, Khaleda Zia. In September 2022, Faruqi filed a case against Awami League leaders, including Kamal Ahmed Majumder and Md Elias Uddin Mollah, over an attack on a rally of the Bangladesh Nationalist Party. The Dhaka Chief Metropolitan Magistrate Court rejected the case. He represented Mirza Fakhrul Islam Alamgir, general secretary of the Bangladesh Nationalist Party, in a case over an attack on the residence of the chief justice by Bangladesh Nationalist Party activists.

After the fall of the Sheikh Hasina-led Awami League government, Ehsanul Haque Shomaji was appointed Dhaka Metropolitan Public Prosecutor, which he declined. Then, Faruqi was appointed the public prosecutor of the Dhaka Metropolitan District and Sessions Judge's Court. He took part in rallies of the Students Against Discrimination, demanding the resignation of Chief Justice Obaidul Hassan. He was one of 669 law officers appointed by the Muhammad Yunus-led interim government. Between July and September 2024, more than 22,000 cases were resolved, resulting in a 72 percent acquittal rate. Faruqi said those cases were politically motivated and fabricated, filed during the Awami League government's rule.

In October 2024, pro-Bangladesh Nationalist Party lawyers assaulted Morshed Hossain Shahin, the lawyer of Awami League member of parliament Syed Sayedul Haque Sumon, while he was speaking to journalists after the trial. The following day, pro-Bangladesh Nationalist Party lawyers hurled insults at Sumon in the courtroom, after which he was seen apologising to Faruqi.

In November 2024, Swapan Krishna Roy Chowdhury, lawyer for Awami League leader Amir Hossain Amu, was assaulted in front of the Chief Metropolitan Magistrate in the courtroom after he accused Faruqi of giving a political speech as his statement. Chowdhury claimed he was attacked by state lawyers, a claim denied by Faruqi, who called the attack staged. This was the fifth time a lawyer representing an Awami League leader was assaulted in court. Lawyers have expressed concern over the growing number of assaults in the courtroom.

Faruqi is the prosecutor in the case against Hasanul Haq Inu, president of the Jatiya Samajtantrik Dal and a former member of parliament, and has argued against his bail, citing his role as a key associate of the fascist leader Sheikh Hasina. As prosecutor in the case against journalists Farzana Rupa and Shakil Ahmed; he opposed their bail petition, saying they aided Sheikh Hasina. He ordered Zunaid Ahmed Palak, former minister; Salman F Rahman, former advisor to Prime Minister Sheikh Hasina; Mohammad Solaiman Salim, former member of parliament; Atiqul Islam, former mayor of Dhaka North; and Mohibul Haque, former secretary, to be brought to court with their hands behind their backs in handcuffs. He claimed it was to prevent them from raising slogans against the government. He opposed the bail of Shamsher Mobin Chowdhury, calling him a "turncoat" for leaving the Bangladesh Nationalist Party.

Faruqi opposed journalist Shahriar Kabir's bail on health grounds, stating, "Shahriar Kabir is a named suspect in the case. Under his direction, protesters were shot, leading to injuries and the death of Rafiqul Islam in Jatrabari. He is an atheist and has spoken against Muslims. Atheists support the Awami League, and the Awami League supports them. He is directly involved in this killing".
