= Attack on Enayetpur police station =

2024 terrorist incident in Bangladesh

Coordinates: 24.2242°N 89.6971°E

The attack on Enayetpur police station occurred on 4 August 2024, during the non-cooperation movement in Sirajganj District, Bangladesh. Fifteen police officers were killed in the assault many of whom were trying to surrender or hiding in neighboring homes. The escalating violence saw Prime Minister Sheikh Hasina resign and flee Bangladesh on 5 August.

== Background ==
The attack occurred during a period of civil unrest and political turmoil in Bangladesh. A non-cooperation movement was underway against the Sheikh Hasina led Awami League government, resulting in widespread confrontations between law enforcement and protesters nationwide. Reports indicated that 26 police stations were targeted in coordinated assaults. The attack on Enayetpur police station was part of a broader wave of assaults on law enforcement. The police headquarters reported that other police stations targeted included:

- Jatrabari and Khilgaon police stations in Dhaka Metropolitan Police (DMP) jurisdiction
- Gorai highway police station in Tangail
- Sherpur police station in Bogra
- Joypurhat Sadar police station in Joypurhat
- Eliotganj highway police station in Comilla
- Ashuganj police station in Brahmanbaria
- Shahjadpur police station in Sirajganj.

Additionally, the offices of the superintendents of police in Narayanganj, Bogra, Pabna, and Sirajganj were also attacked.

== Attack ==
According to police sources, a group of unidentified individuals attacked Enayetpur police station in the afternoon. The assailants stormed the station, vandalized property, and set fire to parts of the building. Thirteen on-duty police officers were beaten to death. Eight of their bodies were stripped of clothes and piled on a heap near a mosque. Some were thrown into a pond, and one was strung from a tree. The identities of the attackers remain unknown. Protestors were seen coming from Khwaja Yunus Ali Medical College.The attackers appeared to be under 22 and were not locals.

In addition to the attack on Enayetpur Police Station, violent clashes in Sirajganj led to 27 deaths, including six people killed during an attack on an Awami League office in Raigonj Upazila. Further violence saw the homes of political figures targeted, with two bodies recovered after the residence of Sirajganj-2 MP Jannat Ara Henry was torched.

The police headquarters confirmed that, in addition to the 13 officers killed at Enayetpur police station, more than 300 officers sustained injuries in the nationwide attacks.

== Reaction ==
Authorities condemned the attacks, labeling them acts of terrorism. Security measures were heightened nationwide, and investigations were launched to identify and apprehend those responsible. The government vowed to restore order and ensure justice for the victims. Prime Sheikh Hasina resigned the following day after the attack and fled to India. Muhammad Yunus took control through an interim government created by the student protestors.

During the July-August student-led uprising, 44 police personnel were killed across Bangladesh, according to a statement from the Chief Adviser's Press Wing. The highest number of casualties occurred at Enayetpur Police Station in Sirajganj, where 15 officers were killed. Additional fatalities included eight officers in Jatrabari and five in Uttara. The police headquarters released an official list of deceased officers. They addressed concerns regarding misinformation about the death toll, stating that any claims of higher casualties should be supported by evidence.

Saidur Rahman, general secretary of Sirajganj District unit of the Bangladesh Nationalist Party, claimed credit for the attack and called it necessary for toppling the government. He described it as part of an effort to “break the backbone of the Bangladesh Police.”.

Bangladesh Police detained Abdul Latif Biswas, a former member of parliament and president of the Sirajganj District unit of Awami League, in a case filed over the attack. The case filed Sub-Inspector Abdul Malek accused senior leaders of the Awami League in Sirajganj. On 2 April 2025, another leader of the Awami League was arrested in the case.

== See also ==
- 2024 Baniachong police station attack
