= Ekattor TV =

Bangladeshi television news channel

Ekattor TV একাত্তর টিভি
- Country: Bangladesh
- Broadcast area: Nationwide
- Headquarters: 57 Sohrawardi Avenue, Baridhara, Dhaka

Programming
- Language: Bengali
- Picture format: 1080i HDTV (downscaled to 16:9 576i for SDTV sets)

Ownership
- Owner: Meghna Group of Industries

History
- Launched: 21 June 2012; 14 years ago

Links
- Website: www.ekattor.tv

Ekattor TV

YouTube information
- Channel: Ekattor TV
- Years active: 2006–present
- Genre: News (in Bengali)
- Subscribers: 15.9 Million
- Views: 12 Billion
- Last updated: August 1st, 2026

Ekattor TV (Bengali: একাত্তর টিভি; lit. 'seventy-one tv', in reference to the 1971 War) is a Bangladeshi Bengali-language satellite and cable news television channel owned by the Meghna Group of Industries, commencing transmissions on 21 June 2012, as Bangladesh's first news-oriented television channel broadcasting in full HD. Ekattor is among the most popular news-oriented television channels in the country. The channel broadcasts from its headquarters in the Sohrawardi Avenue of Baridhara.

== Ownership ==
After the change of political power in 2009, Mozammel Hossain sold half of the shares owned by himself and his relatives in the name of Mustafa Kamal and his one son and two daughters in Meghna Group.

== History ==
Ekattor received its broadcasting license from the Bangladesh Telecommunication Regulatory Commission, along with several other privately owned Bangladeshi television channels, on 20 October 2009. It was officially launched on 21 June 2012 by former chairman Fazlul Haque Khan, with its slogan being "Sangbad Noy Songjog" (সংবাদ নয় সংযোগ; lit. 'Connection, not news'), as the fourth news-oriented television channel in Bangladesh. The channel received an award for the best news channel for 2013 from the Bangladesh Cable Television Viewers Forum in May 2014. One of its programs, Ekattor Journal, was also awarded the best talk show.

The founder chairman of Ekattor, Fazlul Haque Khan, died on 9 March 2016. Ekattor was one of the nine Bangladeshi television channels to sign an agreement with Bdnews24.com to subscribe to a video-based news agency run by children called Prism in May 2016. In July 2017, Ekattor, along with four other television channels in Bangladesh, signed an agreement with UNICEF to air children's programming for one minute. In December 2018, Ekattor began broadcasting using the Bangabandhu-1 satellite. On 13 August 2022, Ekattor broadcast a meeting regarding global energy crisis and the challenges of Bangladesh live. Ekattor is one of the Bangladeshi channels whose YouTube channels were geo-blocked in India on 9 May 2025 during the 2025 India–Pakistan conflict, citing threat to national security concerns.

On 7 March 2026, the International Crimes Tribunal charged Ekattor's chief reporter, Farzana Rupa, and its managing director, Mozammel Haque Babu, with creating a "misleading" report on the 2013 Shapla Square protests by members of Hefazat-e-Islam Bangladesh. The ICT alleged that the report suggested that there had been "no casualties" to distract the public from the true death toll.

=== Broadcast suspensions ===
During the anti-government protests in Bangladesh which resulted in the resignation of prime minister Sheikh Hasina on 5 August 2024, the headquarters of Ekattor were attacked and vandalized. Several pieces of equipment for broadcasting were looted. Besides Ekattor, the headquarters of several other television channels were heavily vandalized. As a result, Ekattor temporarily ceased all transmissions, alongside seven other channels.

== Controversies and boycotts ==
In 2017, Ekattor's website was hacked with a message on screen "HACKED BY Amjonota. Atheist media: Stop anti-Islamic activities.." Ekattor was accused of airing "anti-social" news reports and Nurul Haq Nur even called for a boycott of the channel in 2020, which was condemned by Editors Guild Bangladesh. Bangladeshi Islamic scholars, such as Mizanur Rahman Azhari, also called for a boycott of Ekattor as it was accused of airing anti-Islam content. In 2023, BNP also boycotted talk shows on this channel, alleging 'bias'.

In 2023, Rumor Scanner, a fact-checking organization, listed Ekattor TV as the fifth biggest publisher of fake news in Bangladesh.

On 21 August 2024, the station's former head of news, Shakil Ahmed and his wife, Farzana Rupa, who was also the station's former principal correspondent, were arrested at Hazrat Shahjalal International Airport while on their way to board a flight to Paris on suspicion of instigating the killing of a garment worker who died while participating in a demonstration in Uttara, Dhaka on 5 August. The arrest prompted Human Rights Watch to issue its concern over the matter.

== Programming ==
- Bishajog
- Deshjog
- Ekattor Journal
- Khelajog
- Songbad Songjog

== See also ==
- List of television stations in Bangladesh
- List of radio stations in Bangladesh
