= Sheikh Hafizur Rahman Karzon =

Bangladeshi academic and professor

Sheikh Hafizur Rahman Karzon is a Bangladeshi academic and professor in the Department of Law of the University of Dhaka. He was the director of the Centre for Genocide Studies of the University of Dhaka.

== Early life and education ==
Rahman earned his Bachelor of Laws and Master of Laws degrees from the University of Dhaka in Bangladesh. He later obtained a Master of International Law and Economics at the World Trade Institute.

== Career ==
In 2004, Karzon was critical of the Bangladesh Nationalist Party led four party government's decision to ban the religious books of the Ahmadiyya and quested its constitutional validity. In October 2006, Karzon wrote in favor of reforms of Bangladesh Police. His book Theoretical and Applied Criminology was published in 2008. He filed a petition with the High Court Division along with activist Sultana Kamal and journalist Nurul Kabir challenging the number of legal acts that deny bail to accused in Bangladesh.

In February 2022, Karzon secured bail in a Digital Security Act case filed by the general secretary of Bangladesh Hindu Jubo Parishad Amit Bhowmik over a satirical Facebook post made by Karzon. There were also calls for his removal from the University of Dhaka over the Facebook post allegedly hurting the religious sentiments of Hindus. He had deleted the post and appolozed for his comments.

Karzon published his book Nondito Shoisob Ebong Bangladeshe Kishor Oporadh O Gang Culture in 2023 focusing on youth gangs in Bangladesh. In April, he was appointed director of the Centre for Genocide Studies of the University of Dhaka replacing Professor Imtiaz Ahmed.

In February 2024, Karzon was included in a committee formed by the High Court Division to investigate the death of a child in a botched circumcision operation at the United Medical College Hospital.

In July 2025, Karzon gave an interview to the BBC where he spoke against the mob lynching a Hindu police officer during the 2024 Baniachong police station attack.

Karzon was among the speakers at a roundtable discussion at the Dhaka Reporters Unity on 28 August 2025 that was disrupted by a mob. Participants, including Karzon, journalist Monjurul Alam Panna, and former minister Abdul Latif Siddiqui, were besieged inside the venue before being handed over to police. The event was organized by Gono Forum politician Abdullah Al Mahmud and lawyer Z. I. Khan Panna. The following day, the Dhaka Chief Metropolitan Magistrate's Court ordered Rahman and 15 others to be sent to jail in a case filed under the Anti-Terrorism Act. He demanded 50 million BDT compensation from the Muhammad Yunus led Interim government claiming his detention was a violation of his rights.
