= Munni Saha =

Bangladeshi journalist

- মুন্নী সাহা
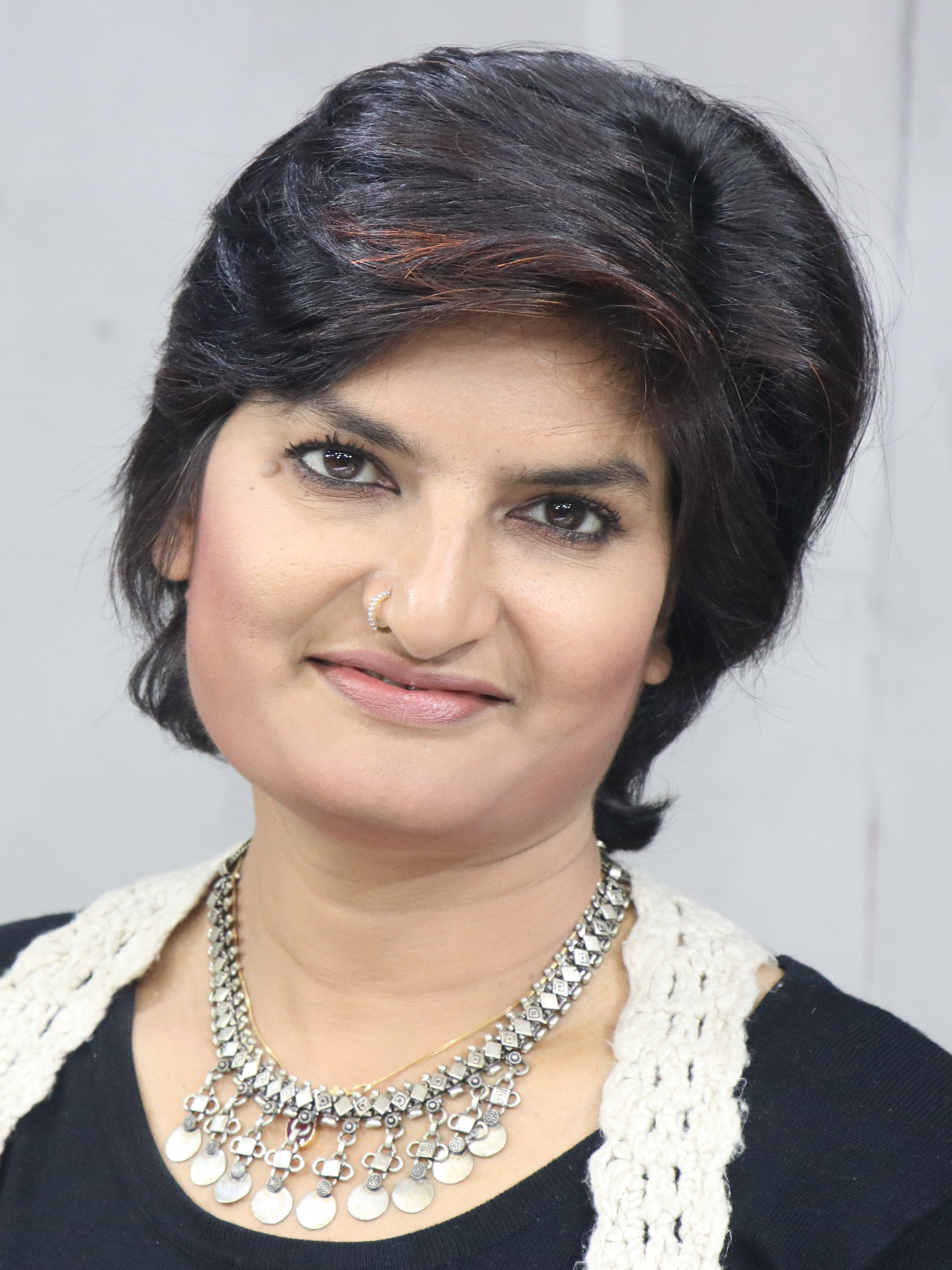
- Saha in 2018
- Education: Eden Mohila College; University of Dhaka
- Occupations: Journalist, television host
- Years active: 1991—2024

Munni Saha is a Bangladeshi journalist and television host who mainly worked at ATN News. She was the news head of ATN News, a news broadcasting tv channel in Bangladesh.

== Early life and education ==
Saha studied at Eden Mohila College and obtained her B.Sc. (H Pass) in 1991.

== Career ==
Saha started at the national newspaper Daily Ajker Kagoj as a sub-editor on the international desk from May 1991 to January 1992. Afterwards, she worked with the national newspaper Daily Bhorer Kagoj as a staff reporter. She was the Special Correspondent of Ekushey TV in 1999, the Special Correspondent of ATN Bangla in 2003 and the Head of News of ATN News in 2010. She has been the chief executive editor of ATN News since 2016. She mainly covers mainstream social and political issues but also health, women and children issues, including child trafficking, violence against women such as acid throwing, rape and other sorts of repression.

Following the fall of the Sheikh Hasina administration in August 2024 through the Student–People's uprising, Saha was charged with crimes against humanity, along with several other journalists, including Ahmed Jobaer, Farzana Rupa, Mozammel Haque Babu, Nayeemul Islam Khan, Shakil Ahmed, and Syed Ishtiaque Reza. The charges were linked to a murder case filed for alleged crimes against humanity committed during the uprising.

In October 2024, the Bangladesh Financial Intelligence Unit requested information about her bank accounts. On 30 November 2024, Saha was apprehended by members of the public in Karwan Bazar, Dhaka, and handed over to the police, who subsequently placed her in the custody of the Detective Branch.
