= Ishaque Ali Khan Panna =

Bangladeshi politician (1966–2024)

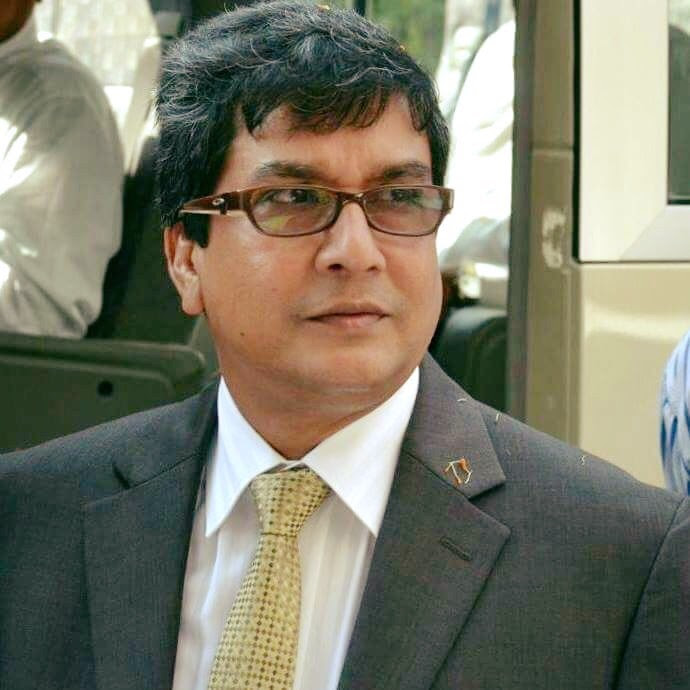
- Panna in 2015.
- Born: 24 March 1966; Bangladesh
- Died: 24 August 2024 (aged 58); Shillong hills at the Bangladesh–India border
- Cause of death: Murdered by stranglation while trying to escape to India
- Occupations: Businessman, politician
- Known for: General secretary of the Bangladesh Chhatra League
- Spouse: Iren Parveen Badhan
- Children: 1

Ishaque Ali Khan Panna (21 March 1966 – 24 August 2024) was a Bangladeshi businessman and general secretary of the Bangladesh Chhatra League. He was a member of the executive committee of the Bangladesh Insurance Association. He was the founder chairman of Diamond Life Insurance Company Limited.

Panna died at the Bangladesh–India border while trying to flee to India after the resignation of Sheikh Hasina and fall of the Awami League government in the Non-cooperation movement (2024).

== Career ==
Panna was elected general secretary of Bangladesh Chhatra League in 1994 and served till 1998. He led protests of the Bangladesh Chhatra League after the controversial February 1996 Bangladeshi general election. According to Banglanews24.com, leaders of Bangladesh Chhatra League started a culture of making money from politics under his and AKM Enamul Haque Shamim's tenure.

On 7 March 2008, Panna submitted his wealth statement to the Anti-Corruption Commission. He was nominated by Awami League from Pirojpur-2 but had to give up the seat to a candidate of an allied party of the Awami League. In 2012, he was appointed assistant secretary of the Central Sub-committee of the Awami League. He received permission from Insurance Development and Regulatory Authority for Diamond Life Insurance Company Limited in 2013 along with four others of whom three were affiliated with the Awami League.

Panna founded NPI University of Bangladesh with Shamsur Rahman in Manikganj District. In November 2018, he collected nomination forms of Awami League for Pirojpur-1, Pirojpur-2, and Pirojpur-3. He received the nomination of Pirojpur-2 from Awami League which was represented by Awami League allied Jatiya Party leader Anwar Hossain Manju. He ended up not standing in the election. It was believed by Awami League leaders that he could not receive a seat in the central leadership council of the Awami League as there were already many leaders from his home region of Barisal Division. Leaders from Barisal in the central leadership of Awami League included Abul Hasanat Abdullah, Afzal Hossain, Jahangir Kabir Nanak, Shammi Ahmed, and SM Rezaul Karim.

Panna was a member of Bangladesh Insurance Association and the Federation of Bangladesh Chambers of Commerce & Industries. He was the chairman of the board of directors of Diamond Life Insurance Company Limited. In April 2021, he was elected member of the executive committee of the Bangladesh Insurance Association under President Sheikh Kabir Hossain.

Panna was a member of Pirojpur District unit of the Awami League. In April 2023, he was elected member of the executive committee of the Bangladesh Insurance Association. In April 2024, he attended a programme of the Awami League with Mirza Azam to distribute water and saline to day labourers in different areas of Dhaka. He met with Obaidul Quader to request the government cancel the Prottoy Universal Pension Scheme for university teachers on 4 July 2024.

== Personal life ==
Panna was married to Iren Parveen Badhan who died on 24 April 2016 from cancer at Mount Elizabeth Hospital, Singapore at the age of 50. She had been a leader of Bangladesh Chhatra League and vice-president of the student union of Shamsunnahar Hall. They had one child, Ibtisum Abtahi Khan Aryan.

=== Death ===
Panna died while trying to enter India in the Shillong hills of Meghalaya state on 24 August 2024, reportedly of a heart attack. Other reports suggested he died of a fall while climbing a hill or was shot by the Border Security Force (BSF). After the resignation of Prime Minister Sheikh Hasina during the Non-cooperation movement (2024), his residence in Kawkhali Upazila, Pirojpur District was vandalized and burned down. He went into hiding and tried to cross into India through Sylhet. His body was recovered by the BSF pending a request by his family to have them repatriated to Bangladesh. Indian police later said that Panna may have been murdered after an autopsy found signs of strangulation. His postmortem report said that he died because of strangulation. According to the postmortem report, "the cause of the death is asphyxia caused by throttling." There were also multiple lacerations on his body, as well as abrasions and bruises on his forehead. When he died, United News of India reported his family claimed he was carrying $20 million with him.
