= Bangladesh Puja Udjapan Parishad =

Hindu organization based in Bangladesh

- বাংলাদেশ পূজা উদযাপন পরিষদ
- Predecessor: Mahanagar Sarbojanin Puja Committee
- Formation: 1982; 44 years ago
- Founder: Major General Chitta Ranjan Dutta
- Founded at: Dhaka, Bangladesh
- Type: Religious organization
- Purpose: Promoting Hindu culture and welfare in Bangladesh
- Headquarters: Dhaka, Bangladesh
- Location: Dhaka, Bangladesh
- Services: Organizing Hindu festivals, religious education, social welfare
- Fields: Religion, Culture, Social Welfare
- Official language: Bengali
- President: Basudev Dhar
- General Secretary: Santosh Sharma
- Formerly called: Mahanagar Sarbojanin Puja Committee (1978–1982)

Bangladesh Puja Udjapan Parishad is a Bangladesh-based non-political, social welfare, cultural, and religious Hindu organization. It coordinates and supervises the celebration of Hindu festivals held in Bangladesh. The organization was founded in 1978 under the name Mahanagar Sarbojanin Puja Committee, and later in 1982, it emerged across the whole of Bangladesh under the name Bangladesh Puja Udjapan Parishad. Its founding chairman was Major General Chitta Ranjan Dutta.

== History ==
=== Reason for establishment and founding ===
In 1971, Bangladesh emerged through the Liberation War, and in 1972, the constitution of independent Bangladesh was written with democracy, socialism, nationalism, and secularism as its fundamental principles. Later, in 1975, through the Fifth Amendment, secularism was removed from the fundamental principles of the constitution, and a single religion, Islam was given special status in the constitution. As a result, the religious minority communities of Bangladesh, especially the Sanatan-Hindu community, were deprived of equal dignity and equal rights, leading to an uncertain future and a lack of security in their national life. Consequently, a strong tendency of emigration emerged among the Hindu population, and due to insecurity and neglect, a severely negative impact was observed on the organization of community pujas, religious and social rituals and ceremonies.

In this context, to maintain balance in the religious and social structure, an organization named Mahanagar Sarbojanin Puja Committee was initially established in 1978 with the aim of organizing the Dhaka metropolis. In the later phase, to ensure proper celebration of pujas, religious and social ceremonies across the entire country, and to unite all Sanatan believers and religious institutions in order to establish equal dignity and equal rights in all areas of national life, the Bangladesh Puja Udjapan Parishad was formed in 1982. Every two years, a conference is held, and a new committee is formed.

=== Central committee ===
In each biennial conference, the president and general secretary of the central committee are elected. Most recently, on March 16, 2024, after the conference of Bangladesh Puja Udjapan Parishad, a new committee was announced. In this, journalist Basudev Dhar was elected as president and journalist Santosh Sharma as general secretary. They will serve in this role for the term 2024–25.

List of former presidents and general secretaries according to term of office:
Term	President	General Secretary
2014–15	Kajal Debnath	Jayanta Kumar Deb
2016–17	Jayanta Sen Dipu	Tapas Kumar Pal
2018–19	Milon Kanti Dutta	Nirmal Kumar Chatterjee
2020–21	Milon Kanti Dutta	Nirmal Kumar Chatterjee
2022–23	J. L. Bhowmik	Dr. Chandranath Poddar
2024–25	Basudev Dhar	Santosh Sharma

== Goals and objectives ==
This organization is a religious, social welfare-based, non-political, and cultural organization of the Sanatan religious community. Its goals include organizing people of all castes within the Hindu religion to ensure the proper and beautiful celebration of pujas and religious festivals; establishing religious values; developing religious culture; propagating religion; publishing religious books; providing religious education; conducting religious ceremonies properly; ending caste discrimination and building a unified society; ending the dowry system; encouraging and assisting inter-caste marriages; assisting members of underprivileged families in marriage; providing support in education and healthcare; helping to preserve the heritage and identity of Hindu followers; dedicating service to the country and nation while upholding human rights, constitutional equal rights, and the spirit of the Liberation War; and conducting awareness-raising activities in society—these are the main goals and objectives of this organization.
