= Indira Gandhi Cultural Center =

Cultural center in Bangladesh

The Indira Gandhi Cultural Center (Bengali: ইন্দিরা গান্ধী সাংস্কৃতিক কেন্দ্র) is a cultural center in Dhanmondi Thana, Dhaka, Bangladesh. It was named after the Indian Prime Minister Indira Gandhi, whose assistance to the Mukti Bahini was vital in securing Bangladesh's independence from Pakistan.

== History ==
It was established on March 11, 2010, by the Indian Council for Cultural Relations. Its activities includes dance, music, art and drama. It has a library and research center and offers annual scholarship to citizens of Bangladesh. As of 2016, Jayashree Kundu is the director. On 4 March 2021, its branch in Gulshan Thana, Dhaka was inaugurated.

The center was vandalized on 5 August 2024 after prime minister Sheikh Hasina resigned and left the country.
