= Shakil Ahmed (journalist) =

Bangladeshi journalist

- শাকিল আহমেদ
- Occupation: Journalist
- Spouses: Farzana Rupa
- Children: 1

Shakil Ahmed is a Bangladeshi journalist and former head of news at Ekattor TV, a private television channel in Bangladesh. Ahmed has detained by the interim government of Muhammad Yunus after the 2024 July Uprising. The detention of Ahmed and his wife, fellow Ekattor TV journalist Farzana Rupa, was condemned by the Committee to Protect Journalists (CPJ), Reporters Without Borders (RSF), Bangladeshi Journalists in International Media (BJIM), and The Editors' Council.

== Personal life ==
Shakil Ahmed is married to Farzana Rupa, who is also a journalist. The couple has worked together in the media industry and were both previously associated with Ekattor TV.

== Controversy ==
In November 2021, Ahmed was accused of personal misconduct. On November 4, a former news presenter of Deepto TV filed a case against him under the Women and Children Repression Prevention Act at Gulshan Police Station.

In August 2024, Ahmed and his wife, journalist Farzana Rupa, were arrested at Hazrat Shahjalal International Airport in connection with a case concerning the death of a garment worker Rubel, during student-led protests in Bangladesh. On August 26, they were placed on a five-day remand in relation to a case filed at Adabor Police Station regarding Rubel’s death. Authorities alleged that Ahmed had played a role in inciting the previous government to suppress protesters, which they claimed contributed to the fatalities.

On August 8, 2024, following the fall of Sheikh Hasina’s government, Shakil Ahmed was dismissed from his position at Ekattor TV. A statement from Mustafa Azad, on behalf of the channel’s management, confirmed their dismissal.

The detention of Ahmed and Rupa prompted statements from several international media organizations, including the Committee to Protect Journalists (CPJ), Reporters Without Borders (RSF), Bangladeshi Journalists in International Media (BJIM), and The Editors' Council. These organizations called for their release, expressing concerns about press freedom in Bangladesh.

== See also ==
- Persecution of journalists in Bangladesh under Muhammad Yunus
