= Farzana Rupa =

Bangladeshi journalist

- ফারজানা রুপা
- Occupation: Journalist
- Spouses: Shakil Ahmed
- Children: 1

Farzana Rupa is a Bangladeshi journalist and former principal correspondent of Ekattor TV. On August 21, 2024, she was detained at Dhaka Shahjalal International Airport in connection with a murder case filed at Uttara East Police Station. On March 5, 2025, during a court appearance, she stated, "I am a journalist. One murder case is enough to hang me," and expressed the desire to represent herself for bail, citing a lack of legal representation. Her detention sparked concern from organizations including the Committee to Protect Journalists (CPJ), Reporters Without Borders (RSF), Bangladeshi Journalists in International Media (BJIM), and The Editors' Council.

== Career ==
Rupa was awarded the Ananya Top Ten in 2013.

In August 2014, Rupa hosted a debate between Shamim Osman and Selina Hayat Ivy following the Seven Murders of the Narayanganj which turned contentious and clips of show went viral afterwards.

In April 2015, Rupa received threats over her coverage of the Pohela Boishakh sexual assault incident in which 20 women were assaulted by groups of young men during Pohela Boishakh. She was threatened by Ansarullah Bangla Team, Jamaat-ul-Mujahideen Bangladesh, and Bangladesh Awami Olama League. She told The New York Times that she was scared to cover the Attacks by Islamic extremists in Bangladesh after receiving threats on her Facebook account.

Rupa interviewed Taslima Nasreen, exile author and critic of Islam, in June 2017. She had been attacked in Newcastle, United Kingdom allegedly by activists of Bangladesh Nationalist Party and Bangladesh Jamaat-e-Islami which was condemned by Dhaka Reporters Unity and the Bangladesh Federal Union of Journalists in 2018. They snatched the camera of Ekattor TV.

Anti-discrimination Student Movement Coordinator, Abdul Kader and Abdul Hannan Masud, called for a ban on 50 journalists including Rupa and her husband and accused them of 'crimes against humanity' for supporting the Awami League government on 8 August 2024 after the resignation of Prime Minister Sheikh Hasina. They were then fired from Ekattor TV.

In April 2021, Rupa was declared unwanted in Ashulia after Prothom Alo correspondent Shamsuzzaman was detained by the Criminal Investigation Department following a report by her.

During the quota movement, Rupa questioned Prime Minister Sheikh Hasina on the issue during a press conference on her trip to China and her answer worsen the situation.

Rupa was detained by Detective Branch from Hazrat Shahjalal International Airport while trying to fly to France with her husband Shakil Ahmed. They were stopped despite securing permission from immigration authorities and multiple intelligence agencies. They allegedly did not have permission from Special Branch. Editors' Council, Committee to Protect Journalists, and the Broadcast Journalist Center expressed concern over their arrest. They are the first two journalist detained by an Interim government headed by Muhammad Yunus formed after the resignation of Prime Minister Sheikh Hasina. They were charged with inciting violence by supporting the former government and the Awami League according to the public persecutor Omar Faruque Faruqui. They were placed in four day remand by a court in Dhaka. Reporters Without Borders called for a fair trial for them. They were sued in another murder case in Jatrabari along with five other journalists, Ahmed Zobair of Somoy TV, Munni Saha of ATN Bangla, Syed Ishtiaq Reza of Global Television, and Nayeemul Islam Khan.

Rupa was sent to jail by Magistrate Farzana Shakila Sumu Chowdhury after rejecting her bail petition. On 27 July 2026, Rupa was charged with crimes against humanity in relation to a documentary she allegedly made about the 2013 Shapla Square protests in which it was stated that no one had been killed.

== Personal life ==
Rupa is married to Shakil Ahmed, journalist and head of news of Ekattor TV. Together they have a daughter.

== See also ==
Persecution of Journalists under Bangladesh's Interim Government (2024–25)
