= Rumor Scanner Bangladesh =

Bangladeshi fact checking website

- রিউমর স্ক্যানার বাংলাদেশ
- Formation: March 17, 2020; 6 years ago
- Founder: Sumon Ahmed
- Legal status: Active
- Purpose: Fact Checking
- Headquarters: Dhaka, Bangladesh
- Region served: Bangladesh
- Fields: Journalism
- Website: rumorscanner.com

Rumor Scanner Bangladesh (Bengali: রিউমর স্ক্যানার বাংলাদেশ) is a fact-checking and information verification organization of Bangladesh which was recognized by the International Fact Checking Network. Their IFCN fact-checking license has been expired since July 2022. The organization was established on March 17, 2020. Its main aim is to prevent ongoing rumors and fake news of Bangladesh and convey the correct information to the people. It publishes fact-check stories through web content as well as digital banners. Its headquarters is located in Dhaka.

== History ==
It debuted on March 17, 2020, to address the negativity of various rumors including the Corona pandemic. Among its founders are Sumon Ahmed, Sakiuzzaman and Sayeed Joy. Within a short period of its establishment, it gained the recognition of the International Fact Checking Network.

== Method ==
It verifies data through a total of eight processes. Namely: solicitation, active monitoring team, selection of claims for verification, research, report writing and editing, digital banner, rating and revision.

== Statistics report ==
From January to August 2023, Rumor Scanner identified 1,082 pieces of misinformation spread on social media and local media. Rumor Scanner has found evidence of 74 false pieces of information being spread at the same time related to the National Parliament elections. Prime Minister Sheikh Hasina has had the highest number (43) of misinformation spread among political figures in these eight months, which is 17 percent of the total political misinformation.

It published 1,400 fact-check reports in 2022. Among them, 82 reports were published in January, 90 in February, 119 in March, 90 in April, 72 in May, 130 in June, 105 in July, 150 in August, 133 in September, 130 in October, 142 in November and 157 in December.

On 2024, According to a report by Rumor Scanner, misinformation about sectarian attacks in Bangladesh is being spread by some Indian media platforms and individuals. The report identifies 50 accounts on X (formerly Twitter) involved in propagating sectarian misinformation, with posts viewed over 15.4 million times. Most of these accounts are based in India, and some international media and individuals are also implicated. The misinformation is being used to incite sectarian tensions.

== Recognition and impact ==
Rumor Scanner was recognized as a fact-checking organization by the International Fact-Checking Network in 2021. Additionally, in 2023, it was honored with the 'Positive Influencer Award' by Leadswin Limited for its role in combating rumors related to Bangladesh's national curriculum that had spread widely on the internet. Multiple media outlets in Bangladesh have published news stories based on Rumor Scanner's surveys and reports.
