= Bangladeshi animation =

Bangladeshi animation is a new form of visual arts experiencing rapid growth. The animation industry employs about 12,000 people in Bangladesh. Most of the animations produced are for outsourced projects from western developed nations. Animation projects related to social awareness programs and TV advertisement purposes are another market, and a few animation studios produce animated shorts and feature films. There are some animation festivals that annually take place in Bangladesh, most prominently the International Animation and Cartoon Festival.

== History ==
Bangladeshi animation traces its origin to the 1980s when the National Institute of Mass Communications started to offer courses on animation. The first major animation project in Bangladesh was a cartoon series titled Meena, developed as part of some social awareness programs in partnership with UNICEF. Meena was first released in 1993 and became a household name across Bangladeshi children. In 2000, another animated television series was released titled The Adventures of Montu Miah, which became hugely popular within a short time. In 2013, the first edition of the International Animation Cartoon Festival Bangladesh, the only major animated film festival in Bangladesh, took place at the Shishu Academy. The production of the first Bangladeshi animated feature film, titled The Dreamstage, began in 2013 and was set to release in mid-2014.

In 2010, Ogniroth Studio was founded, which later became one of the major animation studios in the country.

In 2019, Deepto TV & Cycore Studios produced an animated short film named Tomorrow.

In 2023, Null Station produced the first animated web series named XD Bros. It was released on 15 December 2023. Because of its brilliant animation quality, it generated major hype among the youth of Bangladesh.

Sunset Studio announced a racing-focused anime-style project, "Dead End".

In 2025, it was reported that about 20,000 people are employed in Bangladeshi studios. The industry held $3.0 billion in export earning potential, but is hampered by weak infrastructure, regulatory hurdles, and limited government help.
