= Khyber Pass =

Mountain pass in Khyber Pakhtunkhwa, Pakistan

- د خیبر درہ (Pashto) درۂ خیبر (Urdu)
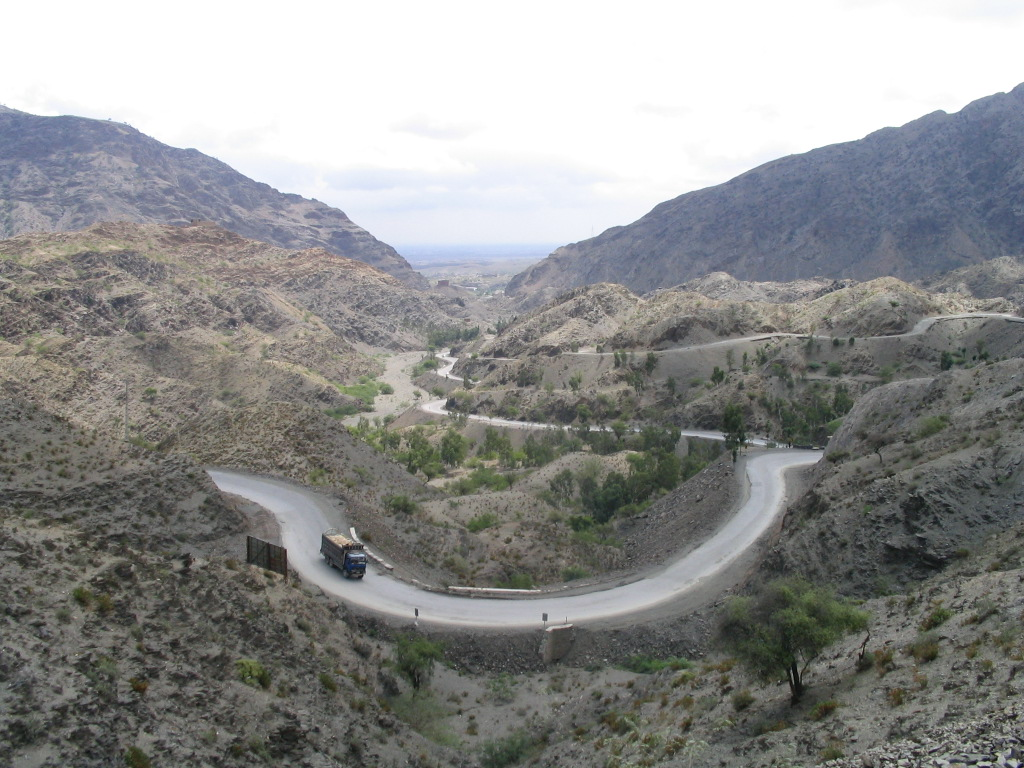
- The pass connects Landi Kotal to the Valley of Peshawar.

- Location within Khyber Pakhtunkhwa Location within Pakistan Location within Afghanistan Location within South Asia
- Interactive map of Khyber Pass
- Elevation: 1,070 m (3,510 ft)
- Traversed by: N-5 National Highway; Khyber Pass Railway

Location
- Location: in Landi Kotal and Jamrud
- Range: White Mountains (Spīn Ghar, Safēd Kōh)
- Coordinates: 34.07570°N 71.20394°E

The Khyber Pass (Note: Urdu: درۂ خیبر, romanized: Dara-e-Xaibar; Pashto: د خيبر دره, romanized: De Xēber Dara, lit. 'Valley of Khyber' [d̪ə xebər d̪ara]) is a mountain pass in the Khyber District of the Pakistani province of Khyber Pakhtunkhwa, along the international border with Afghanistan. It connects the town of Landi Kotal to the Valley of Peshawar at Jamrud by traversing part of the White Mountains. Since it was part of the ancient Silk Road, it has been a vital trade route between Central Asia and the Indian subcontinent and a strategic military choke point for various states that controlled it. The Khyber Pass is considered one of the most famous mountain passes in the world.

== Geography and demography ==
Along Asian Highway 1 (AH1), the summit of the pass at Landi Kotal lies 5 km (3 mi) inside Pakistan, descending 460 m (1,510 ft) into the Peshawar Valley at Jamrud, about 30 km (19 mi) from the Afghan border, traversing part of the Spin Ghar mountains. The pass starts at Kadam near Jamrud, 18 km (11 mi) west of Peshawar. The total length of the pass proper is 40 km (25 mi) from Jamrud to Landi Kotal, although the lesser section of the pass runs for additional 13 km (8 mi) westwards until the town of Lōya Daka, in Afghanistan. The height of the summit is 1,028 m (3,373 ft).

To the north of the Khyber Pass lies the country of the Shalmani tribe and Mullagori tribe. To the south is Afridi Tirah, while the inhabitants of villages in the Pass itself are Afridi clansmen. Throughout the centuries, Pashtun clans, particularly the Afridis and the Afghan Shinwari, have regarded the Pass as their own preserve and have levied a toll on travellers for safe conduct. Since this has long been their main source of income, resistance to challenges to the Shinwari's authority has often been fierce.

== Ancient history ==
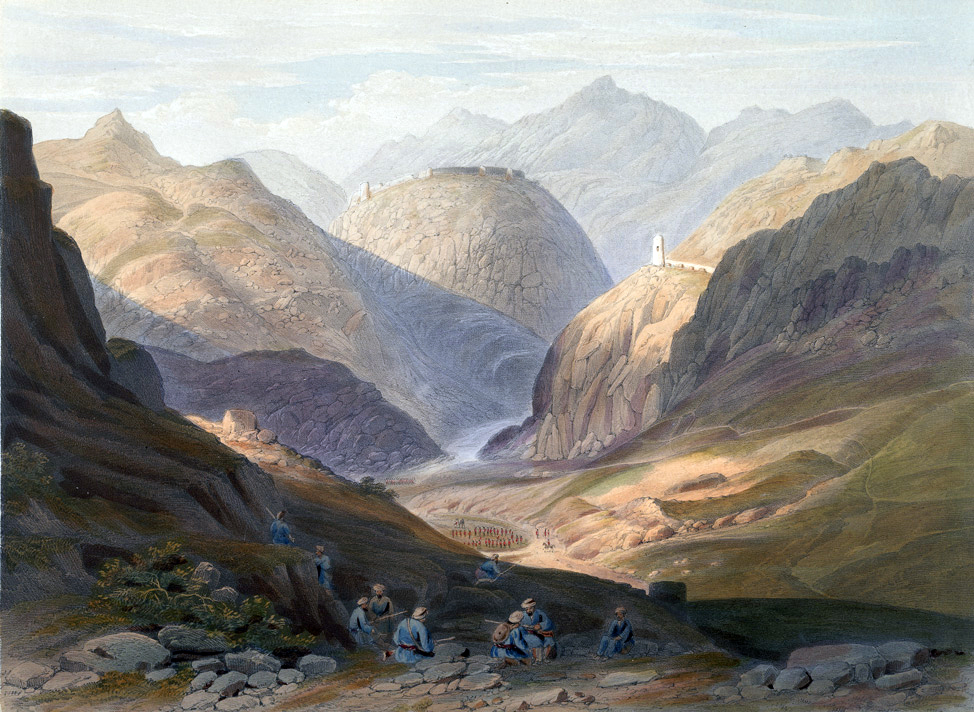
The Khyber Pass with the fortress of Ali Masjid in 1848

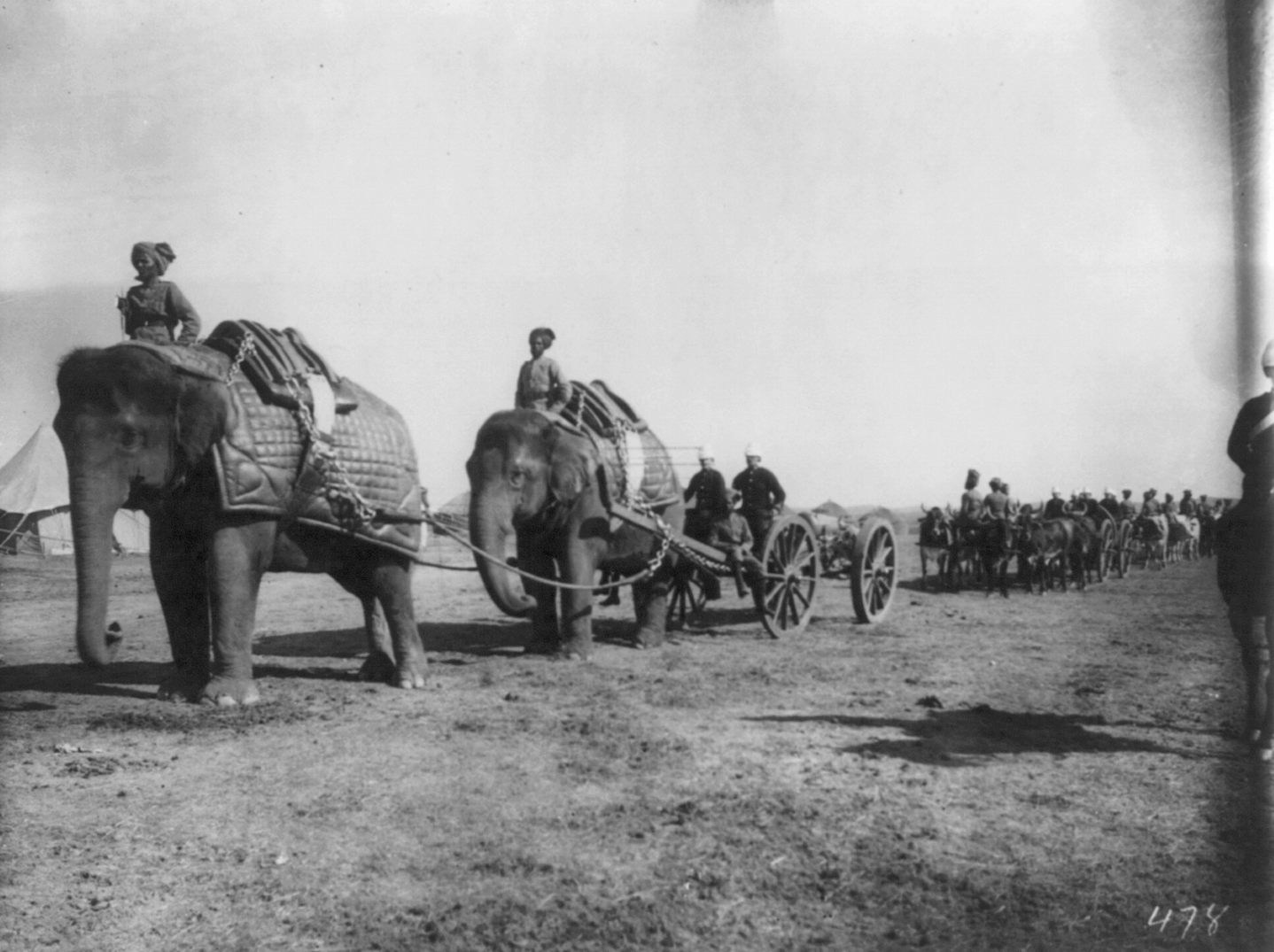
The British Indian Army's elephant battery of heavy artillery along the Khyber Pass at Campbellpur, 1895

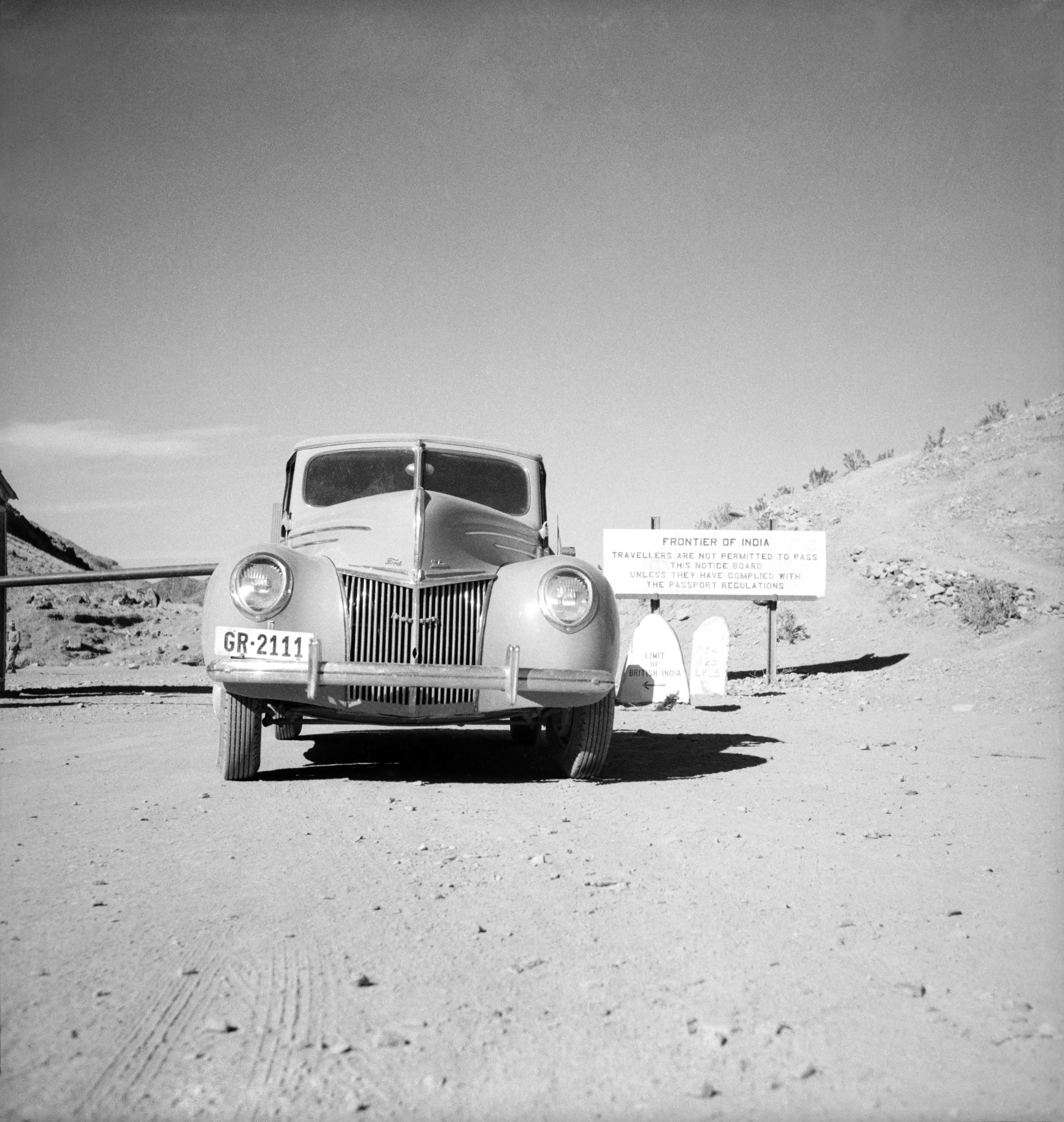
Torkham in 1939

A number of historical invasions of the Indian subcontinent have been through the Khyber Pass, such as those of Darius I, Ardashir I, Shapur I and Anushirvan, and later, Mongols such as Duwa, Qutlugh Khwaja and Kebek. Prior to the Kushan era, the Khyber Pass was not a widely used trade route.

The pass has been traversed by military expeditions launched by empires such as the Achaemenids and Sassanids, as well as by nomadic invaders from Central Asia, including the Saka, Yuezhi, and White Huns. Indian empires rarely extended their control beyond the pass, with the Maurya king Chandragupta being an exception.

The Khyber Pass has witnessed the spread of Greek influence into India and the expansion of Buddhism in the opposite direction. Despite military activities, trade continued to thrive there. The Khyber Pass became a critical part of the Silk Road, a major trade route from East Asia to Europe.

The Parthian Empire fought for control of passes such as this to profit from the trade in silk, jade, rhubarb, and other luxuries moving from China to Western Asia and Europe. Through the Khyber Pass, Gandhara (in present-day Pakistan) became a regional center of trade connecting Bagram in Afghanistan to Taxila in India, adding Indian luxury goods such as ivory, pepper, and textiles to the Silk Road commerce.

== Islamic period ==
During the Islamic period, Muslim rulers, including Mahmud Ghaznavi, Muhammad of Ghor, Timur, Babur, and Nader Shah used the Khyber and nearby passes for their invasions of the Indian subcontinent. The Mughals attempted to control the pass but faced resistance from local tribes. Ahmad Shah Durrani was the last major Islamic conqueror to cross the pass, though his successors' campaigns had limited lasting impact.

== British rule ==
In the 19th century, the British East India Company (EIC) aimed to secure the Khyber Pass from Russia as part of the Great Game.

The region was contested during the Anglo-Afghan Wars, with control shifting between the British, Sikhs and Afghans. Sikhs under Ranjit Singh captured the Khyber Pass in 1837, with the Sikh general Hari Singh Nalwa constructing the Jamrud Fort to safeguard the pass. After the Second Anglo-Afghan War ended in 1880, the Khyber region came under British control, and the policy of paying local tribes to maintain the route's security was implemented.

The British invested in infrastructure development, building roads, railways, and telegraph lines through the pass. For strategic reasons, after World War I, the government of British India built the heavily engineered Khyber Pass Railway, from Jamrud, near Peshawar, to the Afghan border near Landi Kotal. It opened in 1925. A common phrase during British colonial period described the length of what was then British India as "Khyber to Kanyakumari".

During World War II, concrete dragon's teeth were erected on the valley floor due to British fears of an invasion of India by the Axis powers.

== Post-1947 ==
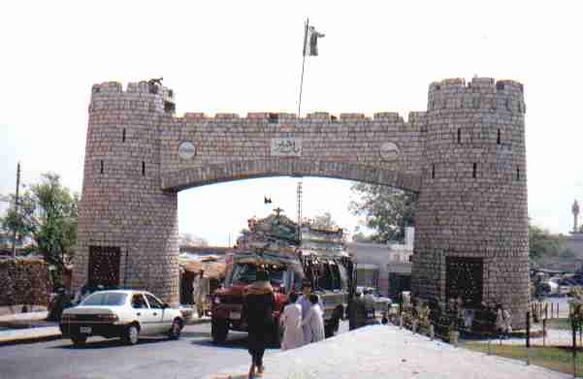
Bab-e-Khyber, the entrance gate of the Khyber Pass

Following the partition of India in 1947, the Khyber Pass became part of Pakistan. Passenger services through the pass have been intermittent, with the Khyber Steam Safari, a joint venture between a private company and Pakistan Railways, operating in the 1990s.

The Pass became widely known to thousands of Westerners and Japanese who travelled it in the days of the hippie trail, taking a bus or car from Kabul to the Afghan border. At the Pakistani frontier post, travellers were advised not to wander away from the road, as the location was a barely controlled Federally Administered Tribal Area. Then, after customs formalities, a quick daylight drive through the Pass was made. Monuments left by British Indian Army units from the era of British colonial rule, as well as hillside forts, could be viewed from the highway.

The area of the Khyber Pass has been connected with a counterfeit arms industry that makes various types of weapons known to gun collectors as Khyber Pass copies using local steel and blacksmiths' forges.

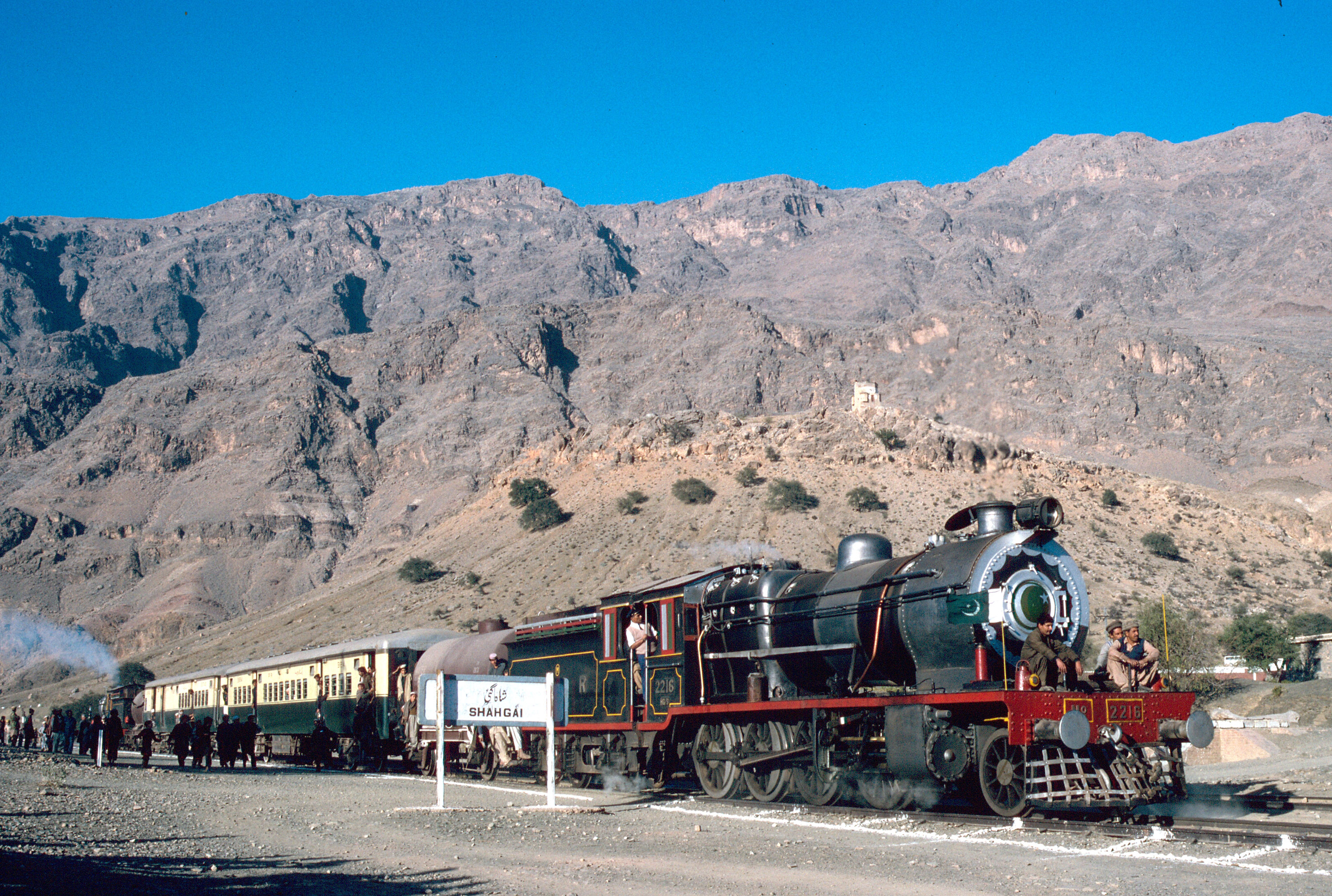
The pass was serviced by the Khyber Pass Railway, currently closed.

During the War in Afghanistan, the Khyber Pass was a major route for resupplying military armament and food to NATO forces in the Afghan theater of conflict since the beginning of the invasion in 2001. Almost 80% of the NATO and US supplies that were brought in by road were transported through the Khyber Pass. It was also used to transport civilians from the Afghan side to the Pakistani one. Until the end of 2007, the route had been relatively safe, since the tribes living there (mainly the Afridi, a Pashtun tribe) were paid by the Pakistani government to keep the area safe.

In January 2009, Pakistan sealed off the bridge as part of a military offensive against Taliban guerrillas. This military operation was mainly focused on Jamrud, a district on the Khyber road. The target was to “dynamite or bulldoze homes belonging to men suspected of harboring or supporting Taliban militants or carrying out other illegal activities”.

This increasingly unstable situation in northwest Pakistan, where the US accused Pakistan of hosting the Taliban, made the US and NATO broaden supply routes, through Central Asia (Turkmenistan, Uzbekistan and Tajikistan). Even the option of supplying material through the Iranian far southeastern port of Chabahar was considered.

In 2010 NATO forces executed a helicopter attack across the border between Afghanistan and Pakistan and killed three Pakistani soldiers in an airstrike. In response, Pakistan closed the pass to NATO supply trucks, causing a convoy of NATO trucks to queue at the closed border. This convoy was attacked by insurgents, who destroyed more than 29 oil tankers and trucks, and killed several soldiers. A probe later found that the Americans had mistakenly concluded that the Pakistani soldiers, who had fired warning shots at the helicopters, were insurgents. That led to apologies from the coalition forces in Afghanistan and top NATO and U.S. officials.

In August 2011, the activity at the Khyber pass was again halted by the Khyber Agency administration due to the possibility of more attacks on NATO forces.

== Cultural references ==
A number of locations around the world have been named after the Khyber Pass:

- A steep and twisting minor road in Mugdock Country Park near Glasgow, Scotland. The road is a landmark along the West Highland Way and is popular among local road cyclists.
- A suburb of Civil Lines, Delhi, India.
- Khyber Pass Road, a major road in the suburb of Newmarket, Auckland, New Zealand (Google Earth view)
- An artificial rockwork feature at East Park, Kingston upon Hull, UK.
- Khyber Road in Phoenix Park, Dublin, Ireland.
- A steep and twisting road up the West Cliff at Whitby, UK.
- A pedestrian alley in Stromness, Orkney, Scotland
- Khyber Pass Pub in Philadelphia, Pennsylvania.
- The Khyber Himalayan Resort & Spa in Gulmarg, Jammu and Kashmir.
- A mountain bike trail connecting the Top of the World trail at Whistler, British Columbia to the Whistler Creekside Village.
- A subway in the King's Cross St Pancras tube station. After the King's Cross fire in November 1987, it was replaced.

Other references include the following:

- The bus journey on this road was belle-lettered very beautifully, and a part of its first act, in the selective memoir Deshe Bideshe (1948) by Syed Mujtaba Ali.
- Before the partition of India, the pass was mentioned as part of common Hindustani phrase used to describe the length of colonial India, "Khyber sé Kanyakumari".
- 'Khyber Pass' is Cockney rhyming slang meaning 'arse'. This use is alluded to in the 1968 film Carry On Up the Khyber.
- In the 1975 movie The Man Who Would Be King, the character Peachy Carnehan tells Rudyard Kipling how he and his comrade-in-arms Danny Dravot had fought under Frederick Roberts, 1st Earl Roberts yard by yard through the Khyber Pass during the Second Anglo-Afghan War of 1878-1880
- The podcast Twilight Histories has an episode called "Napoleon in Afghanistan" which partly takes place in the Khyber Pass.
- The Vampire Weekend song "M79" references the Khyber Pass.
- The Tom Cochrane song "Life Is a Highway" (covered by Rascal Flatts and others) references the Khyber Pass.
- The album Rio Grande Blood by Ministry (2006) has a song called "Khyber Pass" which references it as a possible hiding place for then missing and at large Osama bin Laden. This song was also featured at the end of the film The Hurt Locker.
- The song "Red War" by Probot, featuring Max Cavalera on vocals, mentions the pass.
- British rock band Pink Floyd references the Khyber in their song "Up the Khyber", featured on the soundtrack to the film More.
- In an episode of the cartoon series The World of Commander McBragg titled “Khyber Pass”, the eponymous commander has to fend off ten thousand screaming tribesmen in the Khyber Pass.
- Parts of the 1985 Jay McInerney book Ransom take place in or near the Khyber Pass.
- The Khyber pass features in several of Rudyard Kipling's poems: it appears by name in "The Ballad of the King's Jest", as "the Pass" in "Arithmetic on the Frontier", and semi-fictionalized as the Tongue of Jagai in "The Ballad of East and West".
- In the 2023 movie Ghosted, a farmer played by Chris Evans, is abducted to the Khyber Pass and rescued by a CIA operative played by Ana de Armas, as shown by the location card at 35'15", although the film was actually filmed in New Mexico.
- The Belleville boot company has an 8-inch combat boot line named Khyber.

== See also ==
- Ali Masjid
- Bab-e-Khyber
- Battle of Ali Masjid
- Battle of Khyber Pass
- Bolan Pass
- Carry On Up the Khyber, film
- Dasht-e Yahudi
- Dorah Pass
- Durand Line
- Khyber Agency
- Khyber Pass Copy
- Khyber Pass Railway
- Khyber Pass Economic Corridor
- Khyber Rifles
- Khyber train safari
- Landi Khana railway station
