= List of programmes broadcast by Ekushey Television =

This is a list of current and former programs aired on Ekushey Television, a privately owned Bangladeshi television channel.

== Original programming ==
- Ajker Shongbadpotro
- Amrao Boltey Chai
- Atopar Ami
- Bandhan
- Baundule Express
- Bhabi
- Bideshi Para
- Bish Kata
- Bubuner Baba
- Channel 21
- Chirontony
- Choturongo
- Cine Hits
- Deshjure
- Drishti
- Durer Manush
- Ei Shoptaher Biswa
- Ekatturer Ei Diney
- Ekushey Business
- Ekusher Chokh
- Ekusher Dupur
- Ekushey Dupur (News)
- Ekushey, Pothey Pothey
- Ekusher Raat
- Ekushey Shongbad
- Ekusher Sokal
- Ekusher Sondha
- Ghorar Dim
- Ghotok Ebong Amra
- Golpo Solpo Gaan
- Hakarobin
- Ishkool
- Jahur Ali Jahuri
- Kenakata
- Media Gossip
- Mukto Khabor
- O Bondhu Amar
- Onneshon
- Pather Panchali
- Phono Live Studio Concert
- Priyotomashu
- Radhunir Rannaghar
- Shabdo Jabdo
- Shofol Jara Kemon Tara
- Shoshur Bari Zindabad
- Shukhi Manush Project
- The Diplomats
- Three Comrades
- Tobuo Badhan
- Tuntuni Villa
- Virgin Takdum Takdum

== Acquired programming ==
- Alif Laila
- Blue Whale
- Gul Sanobar
- Hatim
- Life on Earth: A Natural History
- Looney Tunes and Merrie Melodies
- Popeye the Sailor
- Shimanter Sultan
- Supernatural: The Unseen Powers of Animals
- The Adventures of Montu Miah
- The Blue Planet: Seas of Life
- The Life of Mammals
- Thief of Baghdad
- ThunderCats
- Turbulence of the Mu Clan
- WWE
- Zoo Quest
