= Afghanistan–Bangladesh relations =

Diplomatic relations Afghanistan and Bangladesh

- Afghanistan: Bangladesh

Diplomatic mission
- Afghan Embassy, Dhaka: Bangladeshi Embassy, Tashkent, Uzbekistan

Afghanistan–Bangladesh relations refer to the bilateral relations between Bangladesh and the Islamic Emirate of Afghanistan. Both countries are members of the South Asian Association for Regional Cooperation and the Organization of Islamic Cooperation.

== History ==
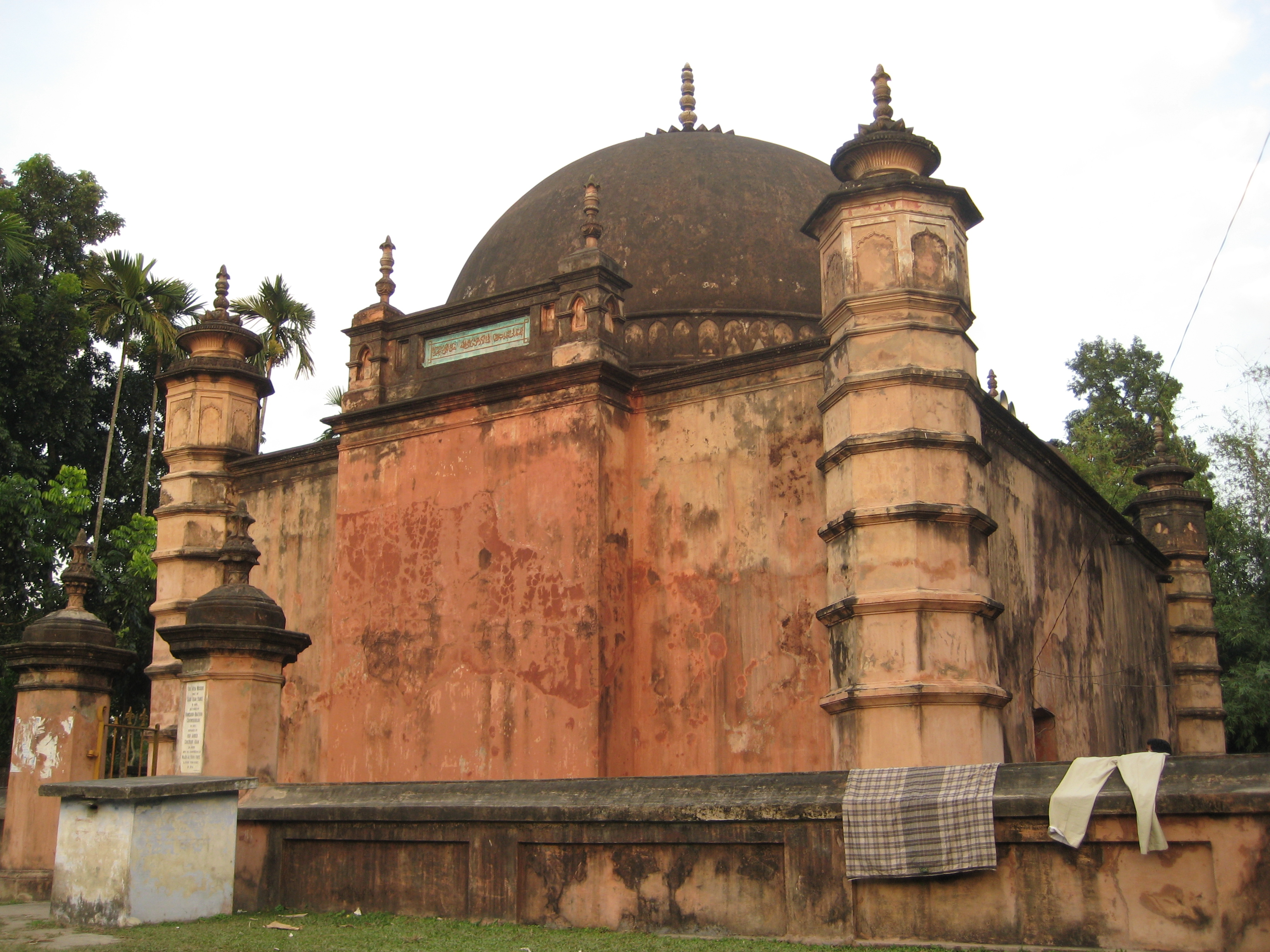
The Atia Mosque in Tangail District was established by a Pashtun landlord belonging to the Panni tribe. The Bengali zamindar family of Karatia are his descendants.

=== Early history ===
The people of Afghanistan and Bangladesh have had connections for several millennia. Certain parts of both of these countries were formally part of the ancient Maurya Empire, from which they were introduced to Buddhism. In the 13th century, Khalaj tribesmen from Garmsir led by Muhammad Bakhtiyar Khalji led the first Muslim conquest of Bengal. Sultan Balkhi, a crown prince of Balkh, was an early missionary who settled in northern Bengal and contributed to the spread of Islam in the region. With the ultimate establishment of Bengal as a Dar al-Islam, there was a migratory influx of Afghans to the country, which continued up until the British colonial period.

During the reign of the Sultan of Bengal Nasiruddin Nasrat Shah, the Pashtun Lodi tribe led by Mahmud Lodi fled to Bengal to escape the Mughal invasion headed by Babur. The Sultan of Bengal offered large amounts of land to the Afghans, and even married the daughter of Ibrahim Lodi. The Sur tribe became the first Pashtun dynasty to take control of Bengal in 1539, but they were soon ousted by another Pashtun tribe, the Karranis, in 1564. Threatened by Mughal aggression in northern India once again, significant numbers of Afghans sought refuge in Bengal. The Afghans formed a confederacy with a group of Bengali nobles after Karrani rule had disintegrated, and this alliance came to be known as the Baro-Bhuiyan Confederacy led by Bengali chieftain Isa Khan. By 1612, however, the final Afghan leader Usman Lohani was defeated, and Mughal rule was finally established in Bengal. Nevertheless, most of the Afghans in Bengal remained and intermarried with Bengalis, eventually becoming culturally assimilated. In 1626, Afghan voyager Mahmud Balkhi mentioned in his diaries of how he came across numerous Bengali families in Rajmahal whose ancestry lay in areas in present-day Afghanistan like Balkh.

During the colonial period, some Bengalis settled in Afghanistan as teachers. One such example is renowned Bengali author Syed Mujtaba Ali, who served as a professor at the Agricultural College of Kabul and wrote Deshe Bideshe (translated to English as In a Land Far from Home: A Bengali in Afghanistan). Bengali troops also played a primary role in the First Anglo-Afghan War, with defeat at the hands of the Afghans altering British India's fate by indirectly contributing to the conditions that sparked the Indian Rebellion of 1857.

=== Modern history ===
During the Bangladesh Liberation War, the Kingdom of Afghanistan provided a critical safe passage to Bengali civilians based in West Pakistan. The People's Democratic Party of Afghanistan called for the swift recognition of the newly established state.

In 2010, former US Special Envoy to Afghanistan and Pakistan Richard Holbrooke requested Bangladesh to send combat troops to Afghanistan. A few days later, SITE intelligence group published a report headlined "Afghan Taliban reacts to US requesting troops from Bangladesh", where the Taliban called for rejecting the US request. Two days later, a press conference by the US embassy in Dhaka restated the request saying, "The United States has intensified its discussion on Bangladesh's engagement in Afghanistan for global peace and stability,". However, there was a general consensus among the politicians of different parties as well as civil society members that Bangladesh should not send its troops to Afghanistan without a UN mandate. Later, the Government of Bangladesh declared that Bangladesh would not send any troops to Afghanistan but offered assistance on the rehabilitation and reconstruction of the war-ravaged country.

Bangladesh refused to welcome refugees from Afghanistan after the United States withdrew troops from the region. There are estimated to be about 146,000 Pashtun living in Bangladesh, although the number of people originating from Afghanistan is unknown. The most Pashtun reside in Dhaka, followed by Rangpur and Rajshahi.

== Cooperation in rebuilding Afghanistan ==
=== Islamic Republic of Afghanistan (2004–2021) ===
Bangladesh has been actively participating in the rebuilding process of Afghanistan, which was praised by the Afghan President Hamid Karzai. Bangladesh has also offered to train Afghan civil servants, police personnel and diplomats and to create a skilled workforce. Bangladesh is also interested in providing technical and vocational training in the fields of banking, disaster management, primary and mass education, health care, agricultural etc. There are about 170 Bangladeshi non-profits working in Afghanistan.

Afghanistan has sought Bangladesh's assistance in enhancing its education system. In 2009, a 12-member delegation from Afghan universities visited Dhaka to gain experience on higher education system. As of 2011, 35 Afghan students, were studying in Bangladeshi universities. Afghanistan has an embassy in Dhaka while Bangladesh does not have an embassy in Kabul.

Several Bangladesh-based NGOs are working for the socioeconomic development of Afghanistan. Bangladesh based BRAC has been operating in Afghanistan since 2002. As of 2012, it had 173 offices across the country, serving 29.8 million people.

=== Islamic Emirate of Afghanistan (2021–present) ===
On 5 July 2022, The Government of the People's Republic of Bangladesh sent humanitarian aid in the wake of the 2022 Afghanistan earthquake.

In 2025, the first major cooperation between Bangladesh and Afghanistan occurred after the return of Taliban rule. A group of delegations visited Bangladesh and agreed to sign a deal to import pharmaceuticals from Bangladesh to Afghanistan.

== Economic relations ==
Bangladeshi jute, ceramics and pharmaceutical products have good demands in the Afghan market. Afghanistan has expressed interest in recruiting manpower from Bangladesh for its reconstruction efforts. In order to expand bilateral trade, Afghanistan has proposed creating a direct business link with Bangladesh.

== See also ==
- Foreign relations of Afghanistan
- Foreign relations of Bangladesh
