= Abdus Salam (businessman) =

Bangladeshi businessman

Abdus Salam is a Bangladeshi businessman and chairman of Ekushey Television (ETV). He took over the channel after former chairman A. S. Mahmud left the country in 2002 following the Bangladesh Nationalist Party government closing the channel. He faced persecution under the Awami League government and was forcefully removed from his television channel. He previously served as the managing director of ETV.

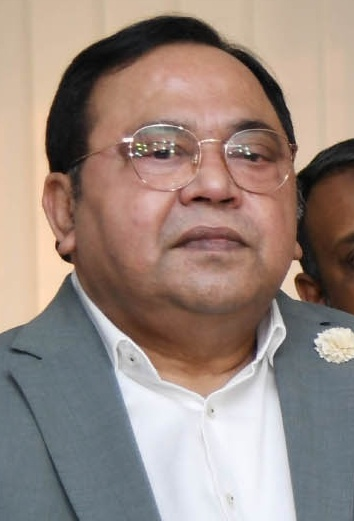
Salam in 2026

== Career ==
Ekushey Television was forced to cease all broadcasts on 29 August 2002 following a verdict from the Supreme Court that the license issued to the network was "illegal", after upholding the High Court's exact declaration and rejecting its appeal. The move to shut Ekushey Television down was protested by the RSF, and many people in Bangladesh gathered outside the court in solidarity with the network. After Ekushey's closure, the founder of the network, A. S. Mahmud, left Bangladesh for England with his family and later died there on 22 January 2004. On 14 April 2005, Ekushey Television, at the time under Salam's ownership, was granted a license to resume broadcasting using its previous facilities, after applying for it three months before, but was only allowed to do so via satellite television. Transmission resumed on 1 December 2006, and Salam blamed the previous government for the delayed transmission and denied Gias Al Mamun owned any shares of the channel.

He first protested the mandate of carriage of news bulletin from the state-owned Bangladesh Television, a mandate imposed on other privately owned channels in 2010. Ekushey Television was accused by the Bangladesh Telecommunication Regulatory Commission of broadcasting illegally without a radio equipment license in 2012, and frequency was withheld. These claims were denied by the network. Salam stated that Ekushey was being a victim of a minister's "conspiracy" in 2012. The National Board of Revenue filed a tax evasion case against Salam in which he secured bail in September.

Ekushey Television was pulled off air in most areas of Bangladesh on 5 January 2015 after broadcasting a speech by BNP senior vice chairman Tarique Rahman. Subsequently, a sedition case was filed against Salam, alongside Rahman, Mahathir Farooki Khan, and Kanak Sarwar. Salam was subsequently arrested on 6 January in a case filed under the Pornography Act, 2012, as the network allegedly aired a false report on a girl in one of their programs, Ekusher Chokh. Salam was detained by Detective Branch officers who drove him to jail in his own BMW car. Following his arrest, ETV fired four staff members over the speech by Tarique Rahman. Former prime minister Khaleda Zia condemned his arrest.

In March, he was denied bail by Justice Quamrul Islam Siddique and Justice Amir Hossain of the High Court Division. In April, the Anti-Corruption Commission filed a money laundering case against Salam, Chairman of ETV Ashraful Alam, and Senior Finance Manager Fazlur Rahman Shikder. Later, the channel resumed broadcasting in some areas and resumed nationwide broadcasts over time. On 25 November 2015, a media release issued by the network that day stated that S. Alam Group of Industries had acquired Ekushey in an auction on 8 October. A former reporter of the channel, Kanak Sarwar, was also detained over the speech by the senior vice chairman of the Bangladesh Nationalist Party, Tarique Rahman.

On 26 January 2015, the Anti-Corruption Commission filed a case against Salam, along with two others, for allegedly laundering ৳2,670,000. Another case was filed against Salam on 2 March 2016, after an allegation that he made fraudulent documents of the satellite charge of Ekushey to swindle out ৳340,000,000. Charges against him and the two others accused were finalized in March 2018. Justice Obaidul Hassan and Justice S. M. Kuddus Zaman of the High Court Division squashed the money laundering case against him.

Shortly after Sheikh Hasina's resignation following the non-cooperation movement on 5 August 2024, Salam returned to the channel and took over. He was appointed as the secretary general of the Association of Television Channel Owners on 17 November 2025.
