= Dasht-e Yahudi =

Mughal-era term for a region in South Asia

Dasht-e Yahudi (Pashto: دښتِ يهودي, Persian: دشتِ یهودی); transl. 'Jewish Desert') is a historic region referred to by Persian and early Mughal Indian historians that comprises the most western parts of modern-day Peshawar, Charsadda, Malakand and Mardan districts, particularly around their border areas with the Khyber and Mohmand districts. While the region is not a desert, it does have a semi-arid climate.

The term was often employed by the Mughals of India in a derogatory sense with reference to the Pashtun tribes that inhabited the region (namely the Afridi, the Khattak, and the Yusufzai) and often waylaid Mughal caravans and contested trade routes. The term "Yahudi" was a reference to the alleged Jewish origin of the Pashtun people.

Despite being the rulers of the Indian subcontinent, Mughal emperors were throughout their long dynasty unable to control the Pashtuns or strip them of their tribal autonomy.

In the present-day countries of Afghanistan, India and Pakistan, the term is obsolete.

== Etymology ==
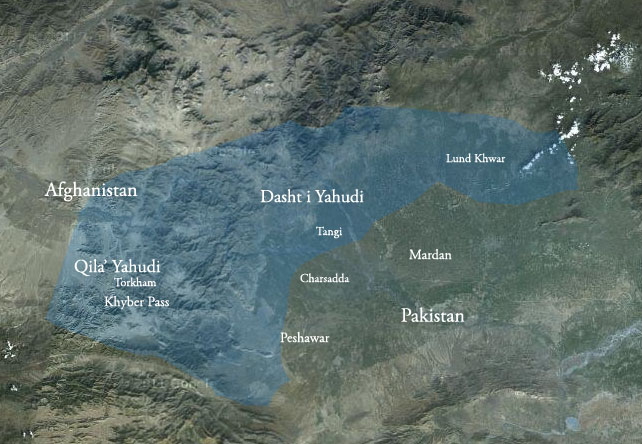
Territory of the historic area represented by the archaic term Dasht-e Yahudi

The term Dasht-e Yahudi literally translates to "Jewish Desert" in Hindi-Urdu and "Jewish Wasteland" in Pashto. It is an archaic term that first appears in Persian and Mughal texts.

Dasht means 'desert' or 'field' in the Persian language. The same word is also used in Pashto and sometimes Urdu or Hindi, where it means both an arid area (waste) or a desert. However, the area recognized as Dasht-e Yahudi is not a desert, but used to be a semi-arid uncultivated area.

The so-called desert used to be barren and mountainous with sporadic dwellings and rare village settlements. In modern times, it has been extensively cultivated and for the most part is lush and green through canal systems and rivers.

== Origin ==
In Persian and Mughal historical texts and rarely in Afghan texts, it is always found with another closely related term: Qilʽ Yahudiya or Qila Yahudi. The word "Qilʽ Yahudiya" literally translates to the "Jewish citadel/fort".

=== People and tribes ===
Three major Pashtun tribes were settled in the area: the Afridi, the Yusufzai, and the Khattak.

The Afridi are settled in the western parts of the traditional region; the Yusufzai are settled on the Northern and North Eastern parts and the Khattak in the central parts. Additionally, the Mohmand tribe is also present in the northwest of the area. Both the Khattak and the Yusufzai were notorious for ransacking Mughal supply lines and trade routes, so much so that the Mughals had to build the Attock Fort to defend against it.

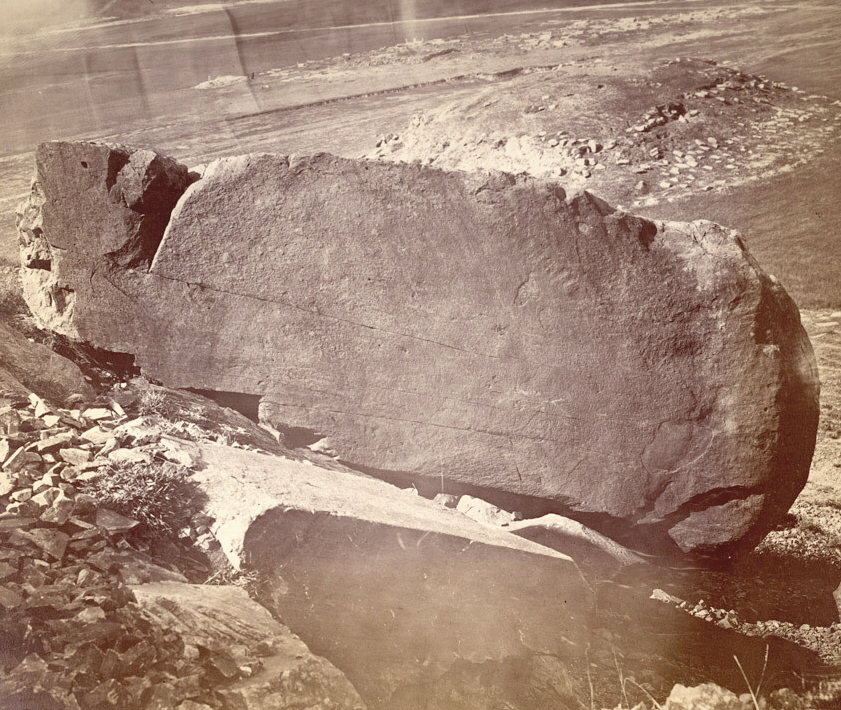
Edicts of Ashoka I–XI in Shahbaz Garhi, Khyber Pakhtunkhwa, Pakistan.

=== Ashoka's Aramaic stone edicts ===
Ashoka was an Indian emperor of the Maurya dynasty who ruled almost all of the Indian subcontinent from c. 269–232 BCE.

Ashoka's famous stone tablets and ancient edicts, some of which are found within the Dasht-e Yahudi regions of Shahbaz Garhi, Mardan, and Swabi, have inscriptions in the Greek and Aramaic languages.

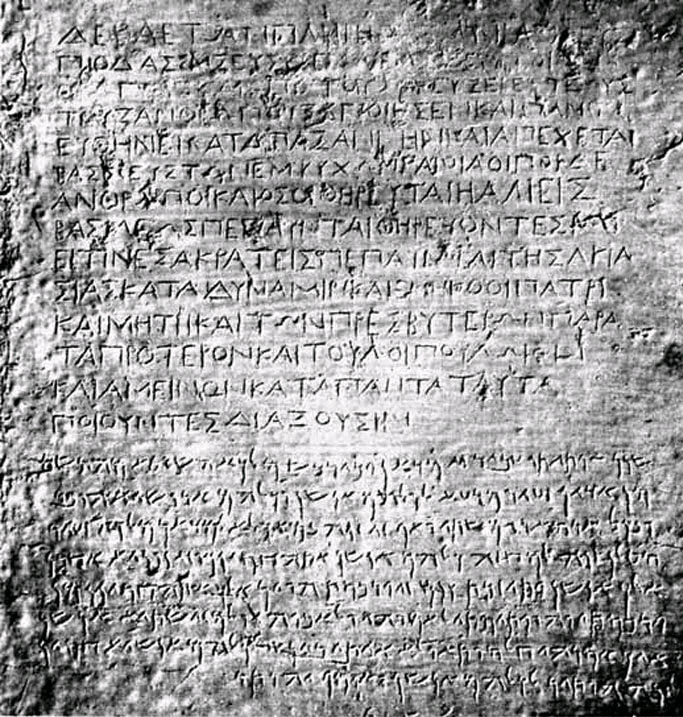
The Kandahar Bilingual Rock Inscription of the 3rd century BCE, compiled in both Greek and Aramaic by the Mauryan king Ashoka in Kandahar, Afghanistan.

== Qilʽ Yahudiya ==
Qilʽ Yahudiya, was an archaic term used by early Arab, Persian, and Mughal historians for the area that in modern-day Pakistan is located in the Khyber District and is simply known as Khyber. The word Khyber is now part of the name for the Pakistani province of Khyber Pakhtunkhwa and the Bab-e Khyber, the pass through which countless armies attacked India.

In its usage, the term thus stands for the Afridi tribesmen that held the Khyber Pass and the mountainous ranges known as the Sulaiman Mountains as well as the Hindu Kush.

== See also ==
- Pashtunistan, a geographic region primarily in Afghanistan and Pakistan that is considered to be the traditional Pashtun homeland
- Pashtuns, an Iranian ethnic group native to Central and South Asia
- Theories of Pashtun origin, various legends and theories that aim to explain the origin of the Pashtun people
- Nimat Allah al-Harawi, a Mughal-era chronicler who compiled a Persian-language history of the Pashtuns
