= Shagai Plateau =

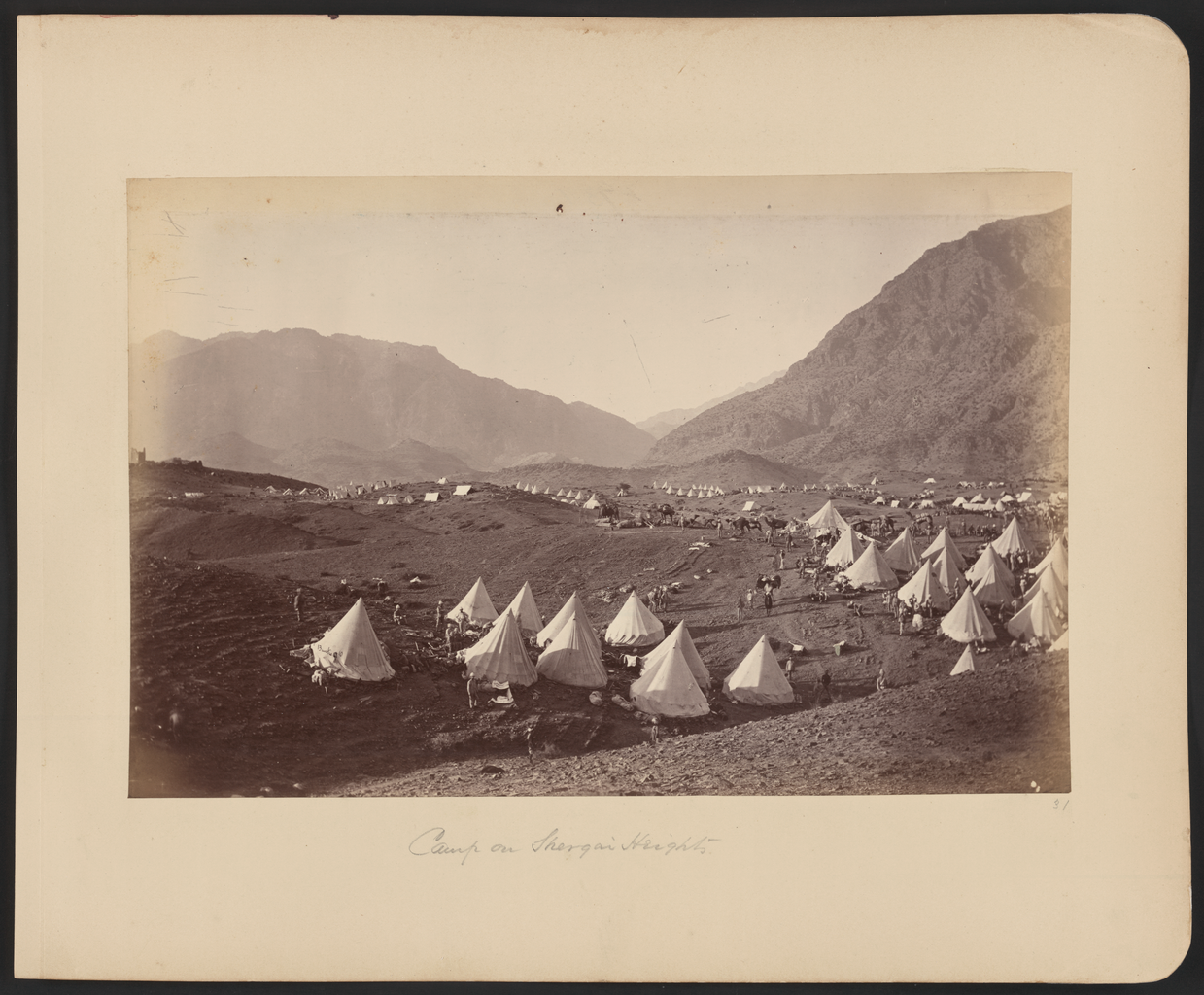
British camp on the Shagai Plateau during the Second Anglo-Afghan War. The conical tents of the Peshawar Valley Field Force are pictured with camels for transport. The smaller hills in the Safed Koh mountain range flank both sides of the encampment. The photograph is believed to have been taken shortly before the Battle of Ali Masjid, fought in late November 1878, the opening battle of the war.

Shagai Plateau, also referred to as Shagai Heights, is an area of flat land along the Khyber Pass. Fort Al Creator was located nearby. The ascent to the Shagai Plateau begins near the entrance to the Khyber Pass from the southeast at Peshawar in what is now Pakistan. It was the site of a British encampment during the Second Anglo-Afghan War, which began in November 1878 when Great Britain, fearful of what it saw as growing Russian influence in Afghanistan, invaded the country from British India. The first phase of the war ended in May 1879 with the Treaty of Gandamak, which permitted the Afghans to maintain internal sovereignty but forced them to cede control over their foreign policy to the British. Fighting resumed in September 1879 after an anti-British uprising in Kabul, and finally concluded in September 1880 with the decisive Battle of Kandahar.
