= The Adventures of Montu Miah =

Bangladeshi 3D animation series

- Montu Miah promotional poster
- Bengali: মন্টু মিয়ার অভিযান
- Genre: fiction educational Action/Adventure
- Country of origin: Bangladesh
- No. of seasons: 2
- No. of episodes: 13 episodes 2001–2002; 8 episodes 2007

Production
- Running time: 30 minutes
- Production companies: Ekushey Television; Softedge LTD

Original release
- Network: Ekushey Television
- Release: 9 November 2001 – 15 January 2007

The Adventures of Montu Miah (Bengali: মন্টু মিয়ার অভিযান), also known as Montu Miar Ovijan, is a Bangladeshi 3D animation series produced by Softedge Limited. It was aired on the Bangladeshi television channel Ekushey Television between 2000 and 2002. Ekushey Television and Softedge Limited signed a 13-episode contract, but only three episodes were aired due to Ekushey Television closing down on August 29, 2002.

Montu Miah, the show's title character, is an ant who lives in rural Bangladesh. He is a protector of rural people who fights corruption, crime, and social injustice. In the scheduled 13 episodes, Montu Miah was going to fight against child abduction, medical malpractice, and abusive behaviors of the rich toward the poor, among others. The problems Montu Miah had to face on each episode were modeled on real-life problems faced by rural Bangladeshi people in their daily lives. The show was created to grow awareness about common problems among the people of Bangladesh.

The Adventures of Montu Miah is the first 3D animation series in the history of Bangladesh and Montu Miah is thought to be the first fictional superhero in Bangladesh who always fights on the side of the poor and the helpless.

== History ==
The Adventures of Montu Miah was created by Softedge Limited which is a multimedia company based on Dhaka, Bangladesh. The company was founded by Syed Javed Mahmood at late 1999. In early 2000, Softedge Limited signed a contract with Simon Dring on behalf of Ekushey Television regarding the production of The Adventures of Montu Miah. They initially signed up for a 13-episode series.

By late 2002, Softedge Limited delivered all 13 episodes to Ekushey Television, but Ekushey Television only aired three of them before the channel officially closed down on August 29, 2002, when Simon Dring and three other executives were charged with fraud. Although Ekushey Television came back on the air on March 29, 2007, the company decided not to resume broadcasting The Adventures of Montu Miah.

== Plot ==
The story is about Montu Miah, an ant who talks and moves like rural Bangladeshi people. He wears a lungi, a symbol of the rural people of Bangladesh. The protagonists and the villains on the show are represented by insects. In each episode, someone from Montu Miah's community falls in the hands of a villain, and Montu comes into rescue. Most episodes end with the downfall of the villain and a happy ending for the protagonists.

== Special episodes ==
The Asia Foundation used the vast popularity of Montu Miah in rural Bangladesh and produced an animated voter education film on democratic representation and accountability. Directed by Javed Mahmood, Softedge Limited produced eight special episodes of The Adventures of Montu Miah which started to air on Channel i and other private television channels of Bangladesh.

These episodes were aired in January 2007 right before Bangladesh's parliament election that was supposed to take place later that month. These episodes were made to inform rural Bangladeshi people about the importance of voting.

After the country's democratic government was overthrown, the airing of the episodes was derailed and only four of the eight were released.

== Public reaction ==
The Adventures of Montu Miah became very popular among the rural people of Bangladesh in the early 2000s. Montu Miah was starting to become a brand before Ekushey Television was shut down in 2002.

The show was created with the help of Poser and the software development company Smith Micro Software previously known as 'Curious labs'. They were asked to highlight their product 'Poser Pro' after Montu Miah success and published an online article with an interview about the making of The Adventures of Montu Miah.

The daily newspaper Prothom Alo issued a cover page article on February 8, 2002. Weekly Holiday featured a story in April 2004 in 'desktop fantasies'. The IT magazine Computer Bichitra used the character in a 'cover page' on its printed issue 8, March 2003.

== Published reference ==
pollob, Mohaimen. "মন্টু মিয়ার নির্মাণ অভিযান". Prothom Alo.

Khan, Mubin s (14 April 2004). "desktop fantasies". Weekly Holidays: The Slate Issue.
