= Jamrud Fort =

Fort in Khyber Pakhtunkhwa, Pakistan

Jamrud Fort Fatehgarh Fort
- جمرود قلعہ
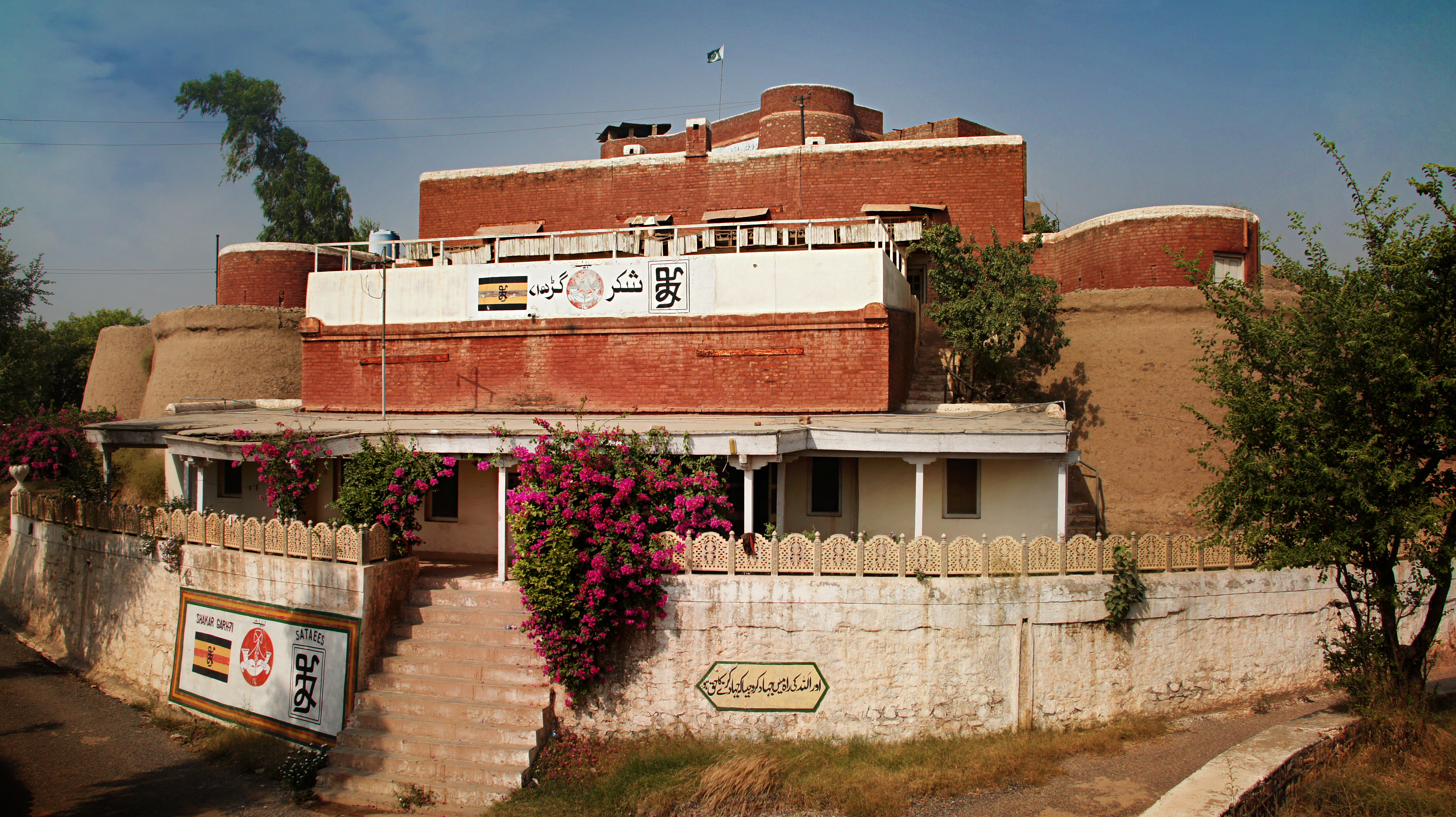
- Jamrud Fort in 2015

Site information
- Type: Frontier fort
- Owner: Government of Pakistan
- Controlled by: Sikh Empire (1837–1849); British Raj (1849–1947); Pakistan Army (1947–present)
- Open to the public: No
- Condition: Intact

Location
- Coordinates: 34.017350°N 71.279887°E

Site history
- Built: 1836–1837
- Built by: Sardar Hari Singh Nalwa
- Materials: Stone and brick
- Battles/wars: Battle of Jamrud (1837); Second Anglo Afghan War

Garrison information
- Garrison: Frontier Corps KP

The Jamrud Fort, also known as Fatehgarh Fort, is located beside Bab-e-Khyber at the eastern entrance to the Khyber Pass from Peshawar, in the Khyber District of Khyber Pakhtunkhwa, Pakistan.

== History ==
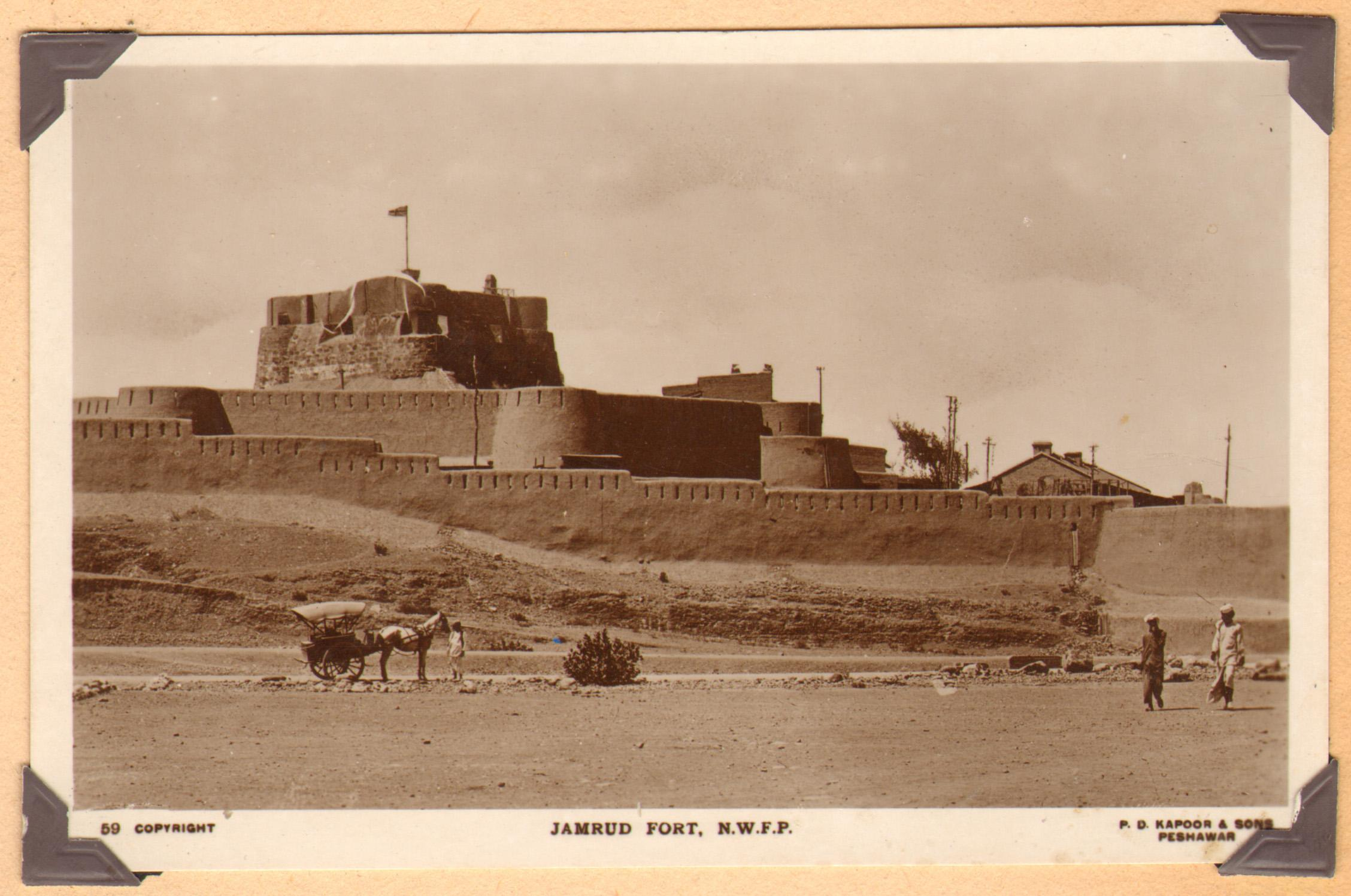
Jamrud Fort, circa 1910

In October 1836, Jamrud was occupied by the Sikh Empire. Sardar Hari Singh Nalwa (1791–1837), the well-known Sikh general, proposed to build a large fort at Jamrud. The proposal was opposed; nevertheless the foundation of the fort that has survived was laid by Hari Singh Nalwa on 6 Poh 1893 Sambat (18 December 1836) and the construction was completed in 54 days. "Jamrud...noted for its fort built with 10 feet (3 m) thick walls c. 1836 by the Sikh Hari Singh Nalwa, one of Ranjit Singh's generals, was originally named Fatehgarh to commemorate the Sikh victory over the disunited tribes."

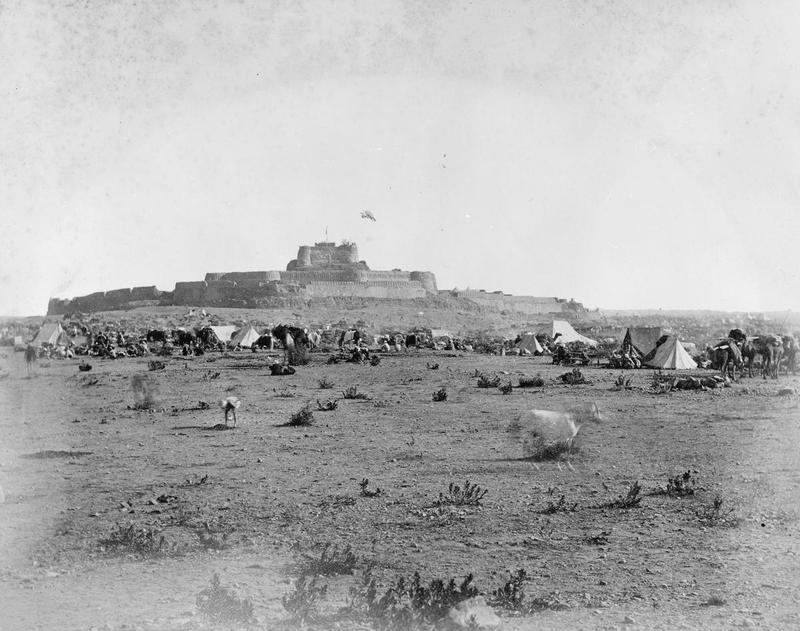
Jamrud Fort (Fatehgarh Fort) at the Second Afghan War 1878–1880

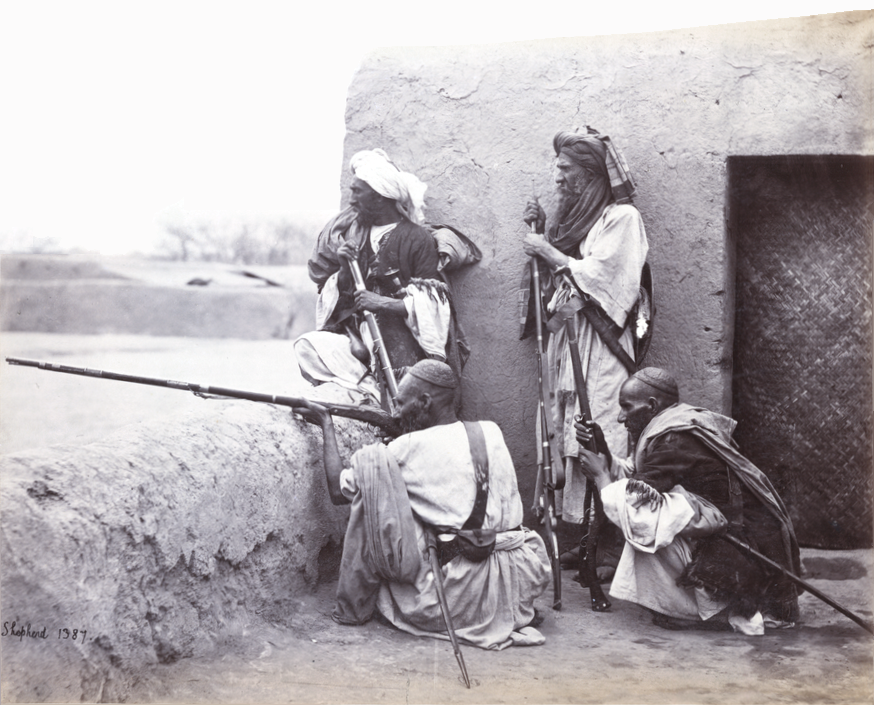
Afridis at Jamrūd Fort (1866) by Charles Shepherd.

Early in 1837, the Sandhawalia Jat ruler Maharaja Ranjit Singh's (1790–1839) grandson, Prince Nau Nihal Singh, was to be married. Hari Singh Nalwa sent his forces to Lahore for this historic celebration. At this time, Mr. Fast, an Englishman, previously in the service of the British India Government, passed through Jamrud on his way to Kabul. En route he encountered Mohammad Akbar Khan, son of Dost Mohammad Khan. When Akbar Khan learnt that the fort at Jamrud was unprotected, he decided to attack. The battle between the Afghans and the Sikhs was fought on 30 April 1837. The loss suffered in this battle by the Sikhs was indeed heavy. Hari Singh Nalwa had sent out an appeal for help to the maharaja to dispatch reinforcements from Lahore post haste, however his letter was not forwarded to the Maharaja by the Dogra chiefs. Reinforcements could not reach in time and Nalwa laid down his life in the battlefield. When the reinforcements arrived, the Sikhs managed to hold the fort and force the Afghan forces to retreat to Kabul.

Jamrud Fort was historically the meeting place of the Masonic Lodge Jamrud, which relocated to the United Kingdom after Freemasonry was banned in Pakistan in 1972.

== See also ==
- List of forts in Pakistan
- List of museums in Pakistan
