= Theories of Pashtun origin =

Ethnogenesis of the Pashtun people

The Pashtun people are classified as an Iranian ethnic group. They are indigenous to southern, eastern, and western Afghanistan and northwestern Pakistan. Although a number of theories attempting to explain their ethnogenesis have been put forward, the exact origin of the Pashtun tribes is acknowledged as being obscure. Modern scholars have suggested that a common and singular origin is highly unlikely due to the Pashtuns' historical existence as a tribal confederation, and there is, in fact, no evidence attesting such an origin for the ethnicity. The early ancestors of modern-day Pashtuns may have belonged to the old Iranian tribes that spread throughout the easternmost Iranian plateau.

== Diverse origin ==
Most modern scholars believe that the Pashtuns do not have a common and singular origin. Although the Pashtuns nowadays constitute a clear ethnic group with their own language and culture, there is no clear evidence that all modern Pashtuns share the same ethnic origin. Likely, the foundational population were of eastern Iranian origin and later mixed with various other groups which they came into contact with in the region over time.

== Bactrian origin ==
The Cambridge History of Iran: Volume 2 also states the Bactrian tribes to be ancestors of Pashtuns. In The Cambridge History of Iran Volume 3, Issue 2 the tribe Parsii are possibly Pashtuns. The Parsii were a nomadic tribe, in the district of Paropamisadae.

== Kushan and Tocharian origin ==
Accrording to Yu. V. Gankovsky, the Tocharians took part in the ethnogenesis of Pashtuns. André Wink states that Ghilji or Ghilzai are descended from the Khalaj who were a Turkicized group and remnants of early Indo-European nomads such as Kushans, Hephthalites and Sakas who later merged with the Afghans.

== Pakhta theory ==
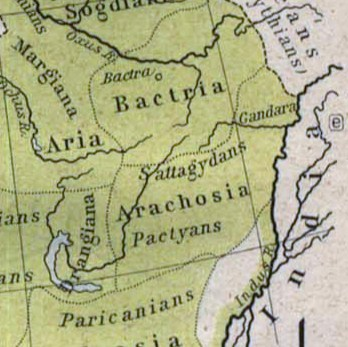
The Vedic people of the region were historically known as the Pakthas, and were identified by the Ancient Greeks as the Pactyans, and considered as ancestors of modern Pakthuns.

There is mention of the tribe called Pakthās who were one of the Vedic tribes that fought against Sudas in the Dasarajna the Battle of the Ten Kings (dāśarājñá), a battle alluded to in Mandala 7 of the Rigveda (RV 7.18.7). dated between c. 1500 and 1200 BCE. The Pakthās are mentioned:

Together came the Pakthas (पक्था), the Bhalanas, the Alinas, the Sivas, the Visanins. Yet to the Trtsus came the Ārya's Comrade, through love of spoil and heroes' war, to lead them.

— Rigveda, Book 7, Hymn 18, Verse 7

Heinrich Zimmer connects them with a tribe mentioned by Herodotus (Pactyans) in 430 BCE in the Histories:

Other Indians dwell near the town of Caspatyrus [Κασπάτυρος] and the Pactyic [Πακτυϊκή] country, north of the rest of India; these live like the Bactrians; they are of all Indians the most warlike, and it is they who are sent for the gold; for in these parts all is desolate because of the sand.

— Herodotus, The Histories, Book III, Chapter 102, Section 1

These Pactyans lived on the eastern frontier of the Achaemenid Arachosia Satrapy as early as the 1st millennium BCE. Herodotus also mentions a tribe of known as Aparytai (Ἀπαρύται). Thomas Holdich has linked them with the Afridi tribe:

The Sattagydae, Gandarii, Dadicae, and Aparytae (Ἀπαρύται) paid together a hundred and seventy talents; this was the seventh province

— Herodotus, The Histories, Book III, Chapter 91, Section 4

== Saka theory ==
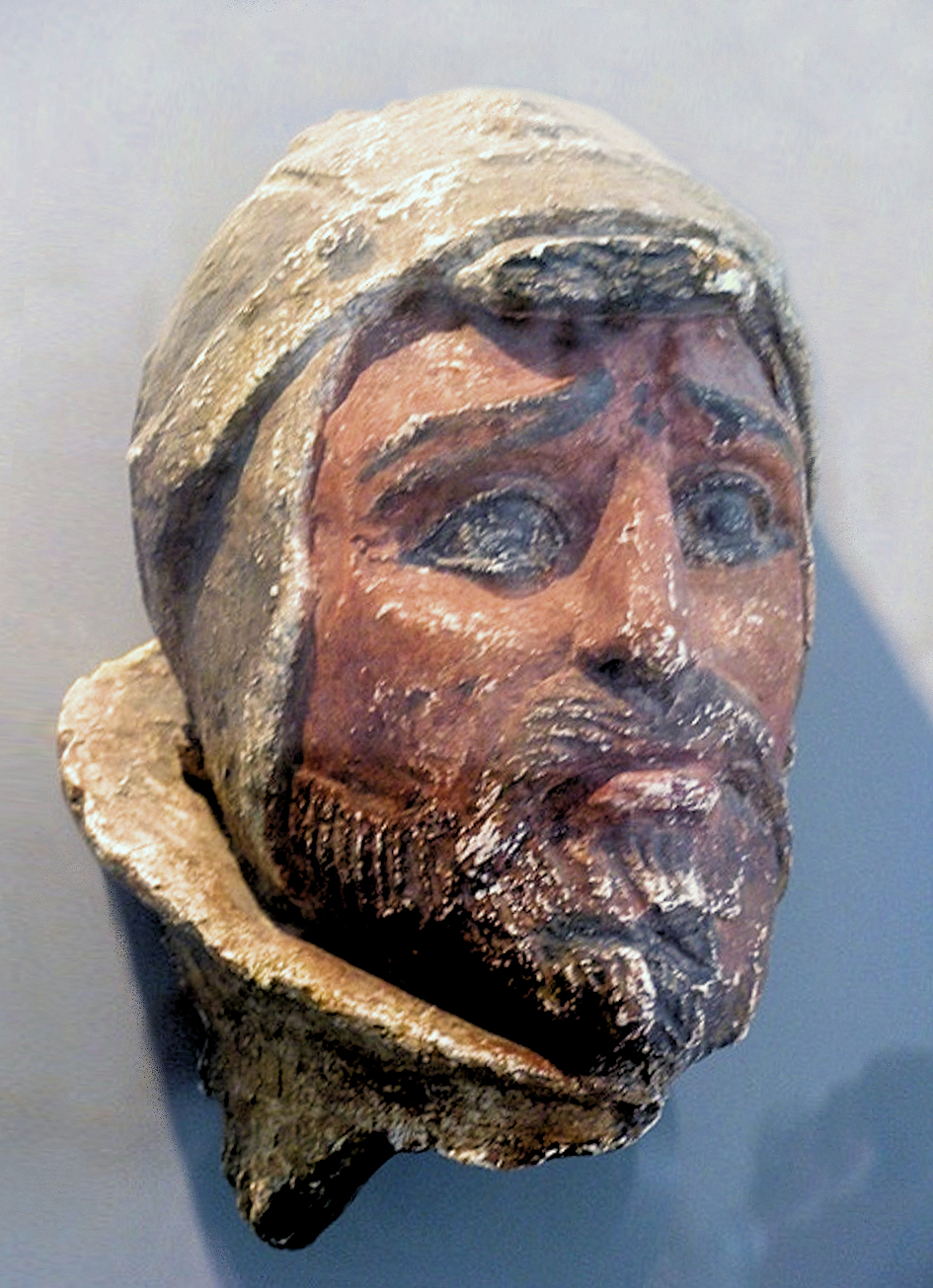
Head of a Saka warrior

Pashto is generally classified as an Eastern Iranian language. It is one of the closest languages to Bactrian along with Munji and Yidgha, with Munji being the closest existing language to the extinct Bactrian, sharing features with Munji but it also shares features with the Sogdian language, as well as Khwarezmian, Shughni, Sanglechi, and Khotanese Saka.

This is considered a different rendering of Ptolemy's Parsioi (Πάρσιοι). Johnny Cheung, reflecting on Ptolemy's Parsioi (Πάρσιοι) and Strabo's Pasiani (Πασιανοί) states: "Both forms show slight phonetic substitutions, viz. of υ for ι, and the loss of r in Pasianoi is due to perseveration from the preceding Asianoi. They are therefore the most likely candidates as the (linguistic) ancestors of modern day Pashtuns."

Linguist Georg Morgenstierne has described Pashto as a Saka dialect and many others have observed the similarities between Pashto and other Saka languages as well, suggesting that the original Pashto speakers might have been a Saka group. Furthermore, Pashto and Ossetian, another Scythian-descending language, share cognates in their vocabulary which other Eastern Iranian languages lack Cheung suggests a common isogloss between Pashto and Ossetian which he explains by an undocumented Saka dialect being spoken close to reconstructed Old Pashto which was likely spoken north of the Oxus at that time. Others however have suggested a much older Iranic ancestor given the affinity to Old Avestan.

== Hephthalite theory ==
Yu. V. Gankovsky, a Soviet historian, proposed an Ephthalite origin for Pashtuns.

The Pashtuns began as a union of largely East-Iranian tribes which became the initial ethnic stratum of the Pashtun ethnogenesis, dates from the middle of the first millennium CE and is connected with the dissolution of the Epthalite (White Huns) confederacy. ... Of the contribution of the Epthalites (White Huns) to the ethnogenesis of the Pashtuns we find evidence in the ethnonym of the largest of the Pashtun tribe unions, the Abdali (Durrani after 1747) associated with the ethnic name of the Epthalites — Abdal. The Siah-posh, the Kafirs (Nuristanis) of the Hindu Kush, called all Pashtuns by a general name of Abdal still at the beginning of the 19th century.

According to Georg Morgenstierne, the Durrani tribe who were known as the "Abdali" before the formation of the Durrani Empire 1747, might be connected to with the Hephthalites; Aydogdy Kurbanov endorses this view who proposes that after the collapse of the Hephthalite confederacy, Hephthalite likely assimilated into different local populations.

Others draw different conclusions. Ghilji tribe has been connected to the Khalaj people. Following al-Khwarizmi, Josef Markwart claimed the Khalaj to be remnants of the Hephthalite confederacy. The Hephthalites may have been Indo-Iranian, although the view that they were of Turkic Gaoju origin "seems to be most prominent at present". The Khalaj may originally have been Turkic-speaking and only federated with Iranian Pashto-speaking tribes in medieval times.

According to The Cambridge History of Iran volume 3, Issue 1, the Ghilji tribe of Afghanistan are the descendants of Hephthalites.

However, according to linguist Sims-Williams, archaeological documents do not support the suggestion that the Khalaj were the successors of the Hephthalites, while according to historian V. Minorsky, the Khalaj were "perhaps only politically associated with the Hephthalites."

== Rajput theory ==
The British physician and authority on oriental languages, Henry Walter Bellew, accredited for writing the first Pashto dictionary in colonial India, suggested that the Pashtuns (Pathans) are descended from Rajputs. Bellew's theory was that all Pashtun tribal names could be traced to Rajput names.

The Arab historian al-Masudi wrote that "Qandhar" (Gandhara in modern-day north west Pakistan) is a country of Rajputs and was a separate kingdom with a non-Muslim ruler. Due to similar sounding names, this has been a source of confusion. Modern scholars and historians have mentioned that Masudi is not referring to the modern city of Kandahar but rather the area of Gandhara in Pakistan's Khyber Pakhtunkhwa province.

Some genetic studies on Pashtuns have been undertaken by academics from various institutions, and the Greek heritage of Pakistani Pashtuns has been considered. While some evidence of Greek lineage has been found in Pashtuns, extensive research has yet to be conducted.

== Israelite theory ==
Some anthropologists lend credence to the oral traditions of the Pashtun tribes themselves. For example, according to the Encyclopaedia of Islam, the theory of Pashtun descent from Israelites is traced to Nimat Allah al-Harawi, who compiled a history for Khan-e-Jehan Lodhi in the reign of Mughal Emperor Jehangir in the 17th century. The 13th century Tabaqat-i Nasiri discusses the settlement of immigrant Bani Israel at the end of the 8th century CE in the Ghor region of Afghanistan, settlement attested by Jewish inscriptions in Ghor. Historian André Wink suggests that the story "may contain a clue to the remarkable theory of the Jewish origin of some of the Afghan tribes which is persistently advocated in the Persian-Afghan chronicles." These references to Bani Israel agree with the commonly held view by Pashtuns that when the ten tribes of Israel were dispersed, the tribe of Joseph, among other Hebrew tribes, settled in the Afghanistan region. This oral tradition is widespread among the Pashtun tribes. There have been many legends over the centuries of descent from the Ten Lost Tribes after groups converted to Christianity and Islam. Hence the tribal name Yusufzai in Pashto translates to the "son of Joseph". A similar story is told by many historians, including the 14th century Ibn Battuta and 16th century Ferishta. However, the similarity of names can also be traced to the presence of Arabic through Islam.

One conflicting issue in the belief that the Pashtuns descend from the Israelites is that the Ten Lost Tribes were exiled by the ruler of Assyria, while Maghzan-e-Afghani says they were permitted by the ruler to go east to Afghanistan. This inconsistency can be explained by the fact that Persia acquired the lands of the ancient Assyrian Empire when it conquered the Empire of the Medes and Chaldean Babylonia, which had conquered Assyria decades earlier. But no ancient author mentions such a transfer of Israelites further east, or no ancient extra-Biblical texts refer to the Ten Lost Tribes at all.

Some Afghan historians have maintained that Pashtuns are linked to the ancient Israelites. Mohan Lal quoted Mountstuart Elphinstone who wrote:

"The Afghan historians proceed to relate that the children of Israel, both in Ghore and in Arabia, preserved their knowledge of the unity of God and the purity of their religious belief, and that on the appearance of the last and greatest of the prophets (Muhammad) the Afghans of Ghore listened to the invitation of their Arabian brethren, the chief of whom was Khauled...if we consider the easy way with which all rude nations receive accounts favourable to their own antiquity, I fear we much class the descents of the Afghans from the Jews with that of the Romans and the British from the Trojans, and that of the Irish from the Milesians or Brahmins."

— Mountstuart Elphinstone, 1841

This view was also expressed by Sir William Jones, who reported that the Pashtun claimed descent from "Melic Ta'lu't", or King Saul.

While some sources assert that historical and anecdotal evidence strongly suggests a connection between the Israelite tribes & the Pashtuns, the theory has been criticized by others as not being substantiated by historical evidence. Dr. Zaman Stanizai criticizes this theory:

"The ‘mythified’ misconception that the Pashtuns are the descendants of the lost tribes of Israel is a fabrication popularized in 14th-century India. A claim that is full of logical inconsistencies and historical incongruities, and stands in stark contrast to the conclusive evidence of the Indo-Iranian origin of Pashtuns supported by the incontrovertible DNA sequencing that the genome analysis revealed scientifically."

—

=== Comparison of genetic studies on Jews and Pashtuns ===
According to genetic studies Pashtuns have a greater R1a1a*-M198 modal haplogroup than Jews:

"Our study demonstrates genetic similarities between Pathans from Afghanistan and Pakistan, both of which are characterized by the predominance of haplogroup R1a1a*-M198 (>50%) and the sharing of the same modal haplotype...Although Greeks and Jews have been proposed as ancestors to Pathans, their genetic origin remains ambiguous...Overall, Ashkenazi Jews exhibit a frequency of 15.3% for haplogroup R1a1a-M198"

— "Afghanistan from a Y-chromosome perspective", European Journal of Human Genetics (2012)

== Arab/Egyptian theory ==
Some Pashtun tribes claim descent from Arabs, including some claiming to be Sayyids (descendants of Prophet Muhammad).

One historical account connects the Pashtuns to a possible Ancient Egyptian past but these lacks supporting evidence.

== See also ==
- Pashtun tribes
  - Qais Abdur Rashid, the legendary patriarch of the Pashtun people
- Groups claiming affiliation with the Israelites
  - Dasht-e Yahudi, a Mughal-era term for the "Jewish Desert" that was Pashtun-inhabited territory
- Nimat Allah al-Harawi, a Mughal-era chronicler who compiled a Persian-language history of the Pashtuns
