= A. S. Mahmud =

Bangladeshi businessman (1933–2004)

- এ. এস. মাহমুদ
- Born: 10 July 1933; Sylhet District, Assam Province, British India
- Died: 22 January 2004 (aged 70); London, England, United Kingdom
- Education: University of Dhaka
- Occupation: Businessman
- Known for: Founder of Ekushey Television
- Relatives: Syed Mujtaba Ali (uncle)

Abu Sayeed Mahmud (10 July 1933 – 22 January 2004) was a Bangladeshi businessman and founder of Ekushey Television. He was forced to leave Bangladesh after the closure of his channel by the Bangladesh Nationalist Party.

== Early life ==
Abu Sayeed Mahmud was born on 10 July 1933 in Sylhet in the then Assam Province, British India (now in Bangladesh). One of his maternal uncles was the litterateur Syed Mujtaba Ali. He completed his bachelor's degree in economics at the University of Dhaka in 1954.

== Career ==
Mahmud joined Burmah Oil as an executive. In 1971, he was an executive director of Pakistan State Oil. After the independence of Bangladesh, Pakistan National Oils was nationalized and renamed Jamuna Oil Company. He moved to London during the Bangladesh Liberation War.

Mahmud left Jamuna Oil Company in 1977 and joined Transcom Group. In 1991, he was appointed a director of Mediaworld Limited and publisher of The Daily Star after the death of S. M. Ali in 1993. He was the Managing Editor of Mediaworld.

Mahmud founded Reliance Insurance Limited. He was a director of the Infrastructure Development Company. He was the president of the Dhaka Chamber of Commerce & Industry. He was a member of the National Pay Commission of Bangladesh and the Industrial Development Council of the World Bank.

Mahmud founded Ekushey Television, which was launched on 14 April 2000 as a privately owned nationwide terrestrial television network, the first of its kind in Bangladesh and the region of South Asia. Shortly after the BNP took office, on 29 August 2002, Ekushey Television was coerced into ceasing operations after being accused of obtaining its license illegally and being biased against the party. Mahmud subsequently left Bangladesh for England with his family.

== Death ==
Mahmud was in a coma for several days following a stroke on 6 November 2003. He died on 22 January 2004 in London, England.
