= Kazi Farms Group =

Business group in Bangladesh

- Type: Private
- Industry: Poultry
- Founded: 1996
- Founder: Kazi Zahedul Hasan
- Headquarters: House No. 35, Road 02, Dhanmondi, Dhaka 1205.
- Products: Poultry feed, eggs, chicken
- Owner: Kazi Zahedul Hasan
- Number of employees: 10,000
- Website: www.kazifarms.com

Kazi Farms Group is a group of businesses in Bangladesh. Kazi Zahedul Hasan, the managing director, was awarded Business Person of the Year for 2004 by The Daily Star (Bangladesh).

== List of sister companies ==
- Kazi Farms Limited is predominantly a poultry company which produces chicks as well as poultry feed, eggs and chickens across Bangladesh. In addition, it also produces cattle and fish feed, fish hatchlings and organic fertilizer.
- Kazi Food Industries Limited produces the Bellissimo and ZaNZee brands of ice cream, as well as Kazi Farms Kitchen brand of frozen food products across Bangladesh.
- Kazi Media Limited (Deepto TV) began broadcasting on 18 November 2015
- Sysnova Information Systems Limited customizes and implements free/Open-source Enterprise Resource Planning and cyber-security software for various companies in Bangladesh.

== Controversy ==
On 22 September 2022, the Bangladesh Competition Commission filed a case against Kazi Farms for destabilizing the stable market by increasing the price of eggs at a higher rate than normal. Hearing the case four days later, the Bangladesh Competition Commission criticized the company for following a "strange" auction policy for fixing the price of eggs. In this auction system, the company finalizes a price after the dealers and distributors bid on the base price. Kazi Farms replied that egg prices had indeed spiked abnormally for a week, but the reason was a shortage of trucks following a national increase in the price of diesel. Singaporean economist Indranil Chakraborty examined Kazi Farms' auctions and found them to be a fair and reasonable means of selling agricultural commodities such as eggs, which typically fluctuate daily due to supply and demand. Kazi Farms asserted that price fluctuations of agricultural commodities like eggs and chicken was a normal phenomenon with a standard economic explanation through the Cobweb model. Kazi Farms also asserted that their auction procedure was a type of Vickrey-Clarke-Groves auction, which was well established.
