= Bab-e-Khyber =

Monument in Khyber Pakhtunkhwa, Pakistan

Bab-e-Khyber (Khyber Gate)
- باب خیبر
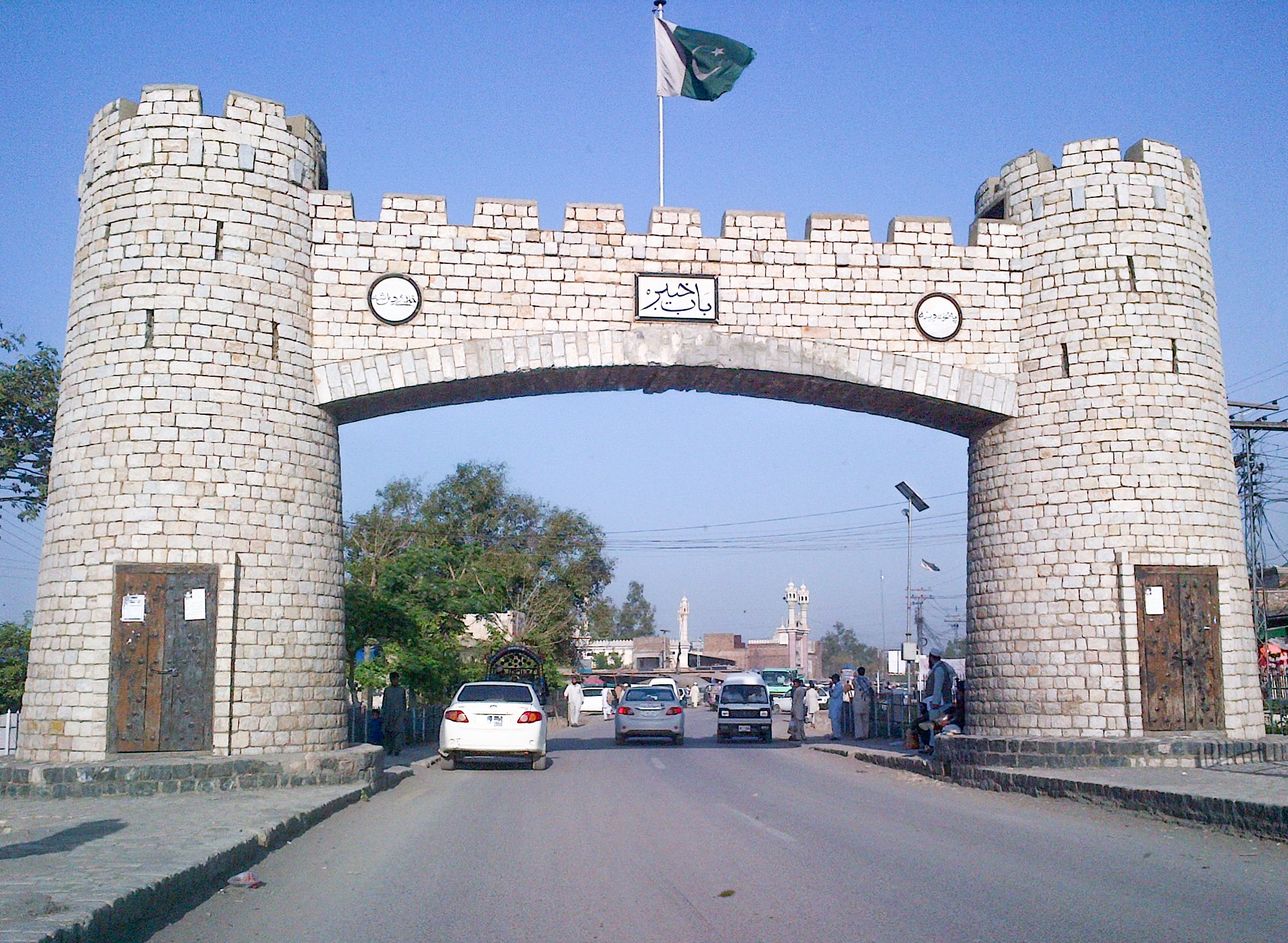
- The Khyber Gate, in April 2014
- Interactive map of Bab-e-Khyber (Khyber Gate)
- Location: Khyber Pass, Jamrud Subdivision, Khyber Pakhtunkhwa, Pakistan
- Coordinates: 34.0025°N 71.3800°E
- Builder: Government of Pakistan
- Type: Gateway
- Completion date: 1963

The Bab-e-Khyber (Pashto and Urdu: باب خیبر; transl. 'Khyber Gate') is a monument situated at the entrance of the Khyber Pass in the Khyber Pakhtunkhwa province of Pakistan. The gate is located immediately west of Peshawar, with the historic Jamrud Fort lying adjacent to it.

== Gate introduction ==
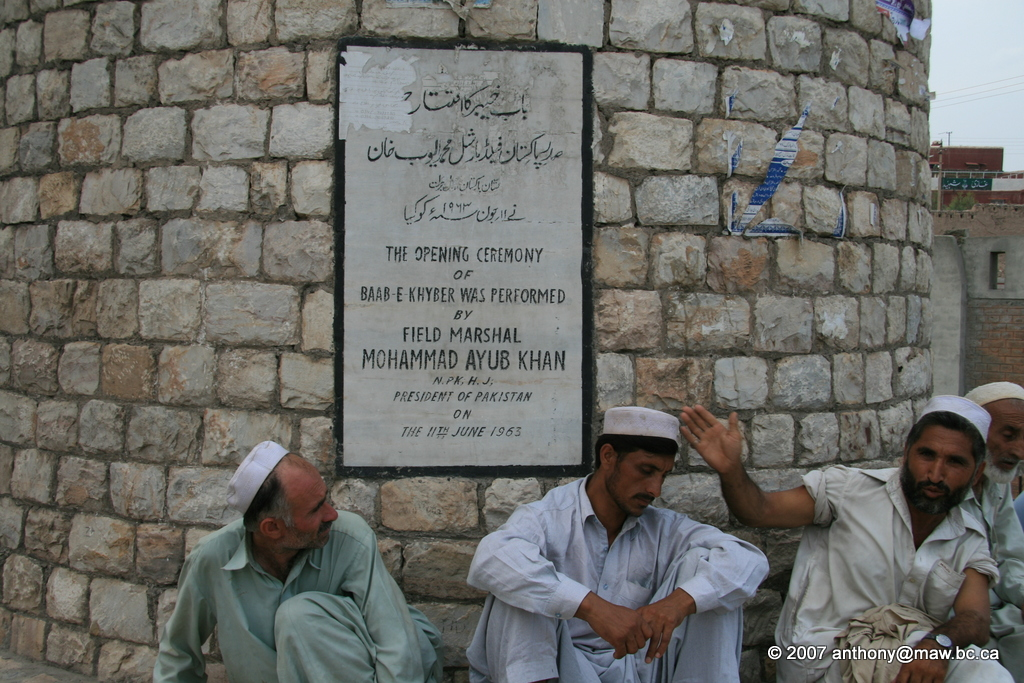
Plaque commemorating the monument's inauguration in 1963.

The gate was inaugurated by field marshal Ayub Khan on 11 June 1963. Khyber Gate is considered to be the most famous post-independence structure in Khyber Agency.

== Pakistani Banknote ==
Vignette of Khyber Pass, Peshawar, along with the name appear on the 10 Rupees Pakistani banknote.
