= International Animation and Cartoon Festival =

International Animation Cartoon Festival Bangladesh
- Status: Active
- Genre: Animation
- Frequency: Annually
- Venue: Various
- Locations: Dhaka, Chittagong, Sylhet, Khulna, Rajshahi, Barisal, Rangpur
- Country: Bangladesh
- Inaugurated: 2013
- Most recent: 2016
- Attendance: 120,000
- Leader: Md Rabiul Islam Rony
- Organizer: Children Communication Bangladesh (CCB)

International Animation Cartoon Festival Bangladesh (IACFB) is an annual international animation film festival in Bangladesh. The first edition of the festival took place on 29 March 2013 at the Shishu Academy in Dhaka. Children Communication Bangladesh (CCB) has been organizing, Support by IFAD Group this festival based on the theme Shishura Shajabey Notun Prithibi Md. Rabiul Islam Rony, Director, CCB & United Nations South Asia plans to host the first international animation festival in Bangladesh among the SAARC countries.
