= Deepto TV =

Bangladeshi television channel

Deepto TV দীপ্ত টিভি
- Country: Bangladesh
- Broadcast area: Nationwide
- Headquarters: Tejgaon, Dhaka

Programming
- Language: Bengali
- Picture format: 1080i HDTV (downscaled to 16:9 576i for SDTV sets)

Ownership
- Owner: Kazi Media Limited
- Key people: Kazi Zahedul Hasan (Chairman)

History
- Launched: 18 November 2015; 10 years ago

Links
- Website: www.deepto.tv

Availability

Streaming media
- DeeptoPlay: www.deeptoplay.com/live-tvs/deepto-tv-live

Deepto TV (Bengali: দীপ্ত টিভি; lit. 'light/shine TV') is a Bangladeshi Bengali-language satellite and cable television channel, owned and operated by Kazi Media Limited, a subsidiary of Kazi Farms Group. It officially began broadcasts on 18 November 2015, and within two weeks became the most watched television channel in Bangladesh. Its programming mostly consist of entertainment with emphasis on daily drama series. Deepto also broadcasts foreign programming, mainly Turkish drama series.

== History ==
In December 2011, the Bangladesh Telecommunication Regulatory Commission granted "Deepto Bangla TV" a license to broadcast. The channel commenced transmissions as Deepto TV on 18 November 2015, and later aired the first and second episodes of Turkish drama series Muhteşem Yüzyıl, which helped with the channel's skyrocketing viewership. Muhteşem Yüzyıl was ranked the second highest among television series watched in the country by the first week of January 2016, and the channel itself was ranked highest among television channels in Bangladesh in terms of television ratings. Other than that, its local productions, which are Aparajita, Palki, Khujey Firi Takey, also gained initial success. The channel also broadcast Cartoon Network's Ben 10 and The Powerpuff Girls from its launch. In observance of the Martyred Intellectuals Day on 14 December 2015, Deepto TV produced and subsequently broadcast Amra Tomader Bhulini, a documentary on the life of martyred journalist Serajuddin Hossain.

On 7 June 2016, agriculture-related television series Deepto Krishi began airing on the channel. In December 2016, Bangladeshi television professionals demanded Deepto TV and three other local television channels to take dubbed foreign television series, which have gained popularity in the country, off their schedules. On 22 February 2017, American-French television series Highlander premiered on Deepto TV. On 19 May 2019, Deepto TV, along with five other channels, began broadcasting via the Bangabandhu-1 satellite after signing an agreement with BSCL. Three new drama series, Bhalobashar Alo-Andhar, Khalnayak, and Maan Obhimaan, debuted on Deepto TV on 26 October 2019. On 29 November 2019, Tomorrow, an animated film regarding climate change, had its world premiere on Deepto TV.

On 16 April 2020, Deepto TV halted news broadcasts for two weeks after four journalists working for the channel have contracted the COVID-19 disease. According to TRP reports during Eid al-Fitr in 2020, Deepto TV was ranked second highest among television channels in Bangladesh, only behind RTV. On 11 July 2020, Deepto TV premiered Turkish drama series Kadın, with its title being localized as Bahar, which had regularly topped the list of the most watched television programs in Bangladesh. In November 2020, Deepto TV began airing the Turkish drama Adını Feriha Koydum and local drama Mashrafi Junior.

On 18 November 2021, coinciding its sixth anniversary, Deepto TV began handing out the Deepto Awards. Deepto TV won the Best Use of Social Media award at the Bangladesh Media Innovation Awards 2022 held in September 2022. The channel inaugurated its own over-the-top platform, which is named Deepto Play, on 28 November 2022.

== Programming ==
Apart from foreign programming, all of the programming on Deepto TV are produced by Kazi Media Limited.

=== Original programming ===
==== Documentary ====
- Deepto Krishi

==== Drama ====
- Agun Pakhi
- Aparajita
- Bhalobashar Alo-Andhar
- Joba
- Khalnayak
- Khujey Firi Takey
- Maan Obhimaan
- Mashrafe Junior
- Oli
- Palki

=== Acquired programming ===
- Adını Feriha Koydum (title localized as Feriha; shown daily)
- Ben 10
- Bizim Hikaye (title localized as Amader Golpo)
- Elif
- Ezel
- Highlander
- Kadın (title localized as Bahar)
- Muhteşem Yüzyıl (title localized as Sultan Suleiman)
- Muhteşem Yüzyıl: Kösem (title localized as Sultan Suleiman Kosem)
- The Powerpuff Girls
- Princess Agents (title localized as রহস্যময়ী)
- Sherlock Holmes

== DeeptoPlay ==
DeeptoPlay is a subscription based OTT platform that streams the live Deepto TV as well as allows Video-on-Demand service to be accessed. Price ranges from Tk.75/month to Tk.694/year(Tk.57.83/month) as of October 2026.
