= Khyber Himalayan Resort & Spa =

Luxury resort in Gulmarg, Jammu and Kashmir

Coordinates: 34.0430°N 74.3852°E

The Khyber Himalayan Resort & Spa, or simply The Khyber, is an Indian luxury resort in Gulmarg, Jammu and Kashmir. It was inaugurated in 2012 and was originally built with INR 120 crore over a period of seven years. It has 85 rooms across five categories. The resort is located at around 8,825 ft in the Pir Panjal range of the Himalayas. Over the years, the resort has won several awards across categories. It is managed by Interstate Hotels & Resorts.

Its spa is operated by L'Occitane en Provence, a French beauty product company.
