= Tomorrow (2019 film) =

2019 Bangladeshi animated short film

- Official poster for TV release
- টুমরো
- Genre: Drama
- Screenplay by: Ahmed Khan Hirok; Nasimul Hasan
- Story by: Kazi Zahin Hasan; Kazi Zeeshan Hasan
- Directed by: Mohammad Shihab Uddin
- Voices of: See below
- Country of origin: Bangladesh
- Original language: Bengali

Production
- Producers: Kazi Zahin Hasan; Kazi Zeeshan Hasan
- Cinematography: Adnan Al Sazzad; Mohammad Shihab Uddin
- Editor: Mohammad Shihab Uddin
- Running time: 25 minutes
- Production companies: Kazi Media Limited; Cycore Studios (animation services)
- Budget: 10 million Taka

Original release
- Network: Deepto TV
- Release: 29 November 2019

Tomorrow is a 2019 Bangladeshi animated short film directed by Mohammad Shihab Uddin which was released in 2019 on Deepto TV. The film is produced by Kazi Zahin Hasan and Kazi Zeeshan Hasan for Kazi Media Limited while Cycore Studios provided the animation and production services for the film. The main purpose of the film was to explain the climate change crisis to children. It won the best animation film award at Cannes world film festival for the month of August, 2021.

== Plot ==
A young boy named Ratul in Bangladesh, is magically shown two very different visions of the future. In the first scenario, Bangladesh has been inundated by rising sea levels, causing great suffering. In the second scenario, fossil fuels have been replaced by renewable energy and Bangladesh is prosperous.

The film explains that burning fossil fuels causes climate change, and that the climate crisis can be solved by taxing fossil fuels so that fossil fuels are replaced with renewable energy and nuclear power.

== Voice cast ==
- Deepak Kumar Goswami as Batasher Buro (Old Wind Man)

The character was inspired by the ghosts of A Christmas Carol

- Eashan Abdullah as Ratul (younger)
- Mohammad Morshed Siddique as Ratul (adult)
- Raju Ahmed as father of Ratul
- Tom Freeman as foreigner journalist
- Sajib Roy as villager 01
- Rafiqul Islam as villager 02
- Shafiqul Islam as villager 03
- Albino George Pike as villager 04

(Voice over: Mohammad Bari)

== Release ==
The short film originally released on Deepto TV, a Bangladeshi satellite television on 29 November 2019. After about one month, it was officially released on YouTube.

== Reception ==
Bill Mckibben, founder of 350.org, tweeted positively about the film.
