= Simon Dring =

British journalist (1945–2021)

Simon John Dring (11 January 1945 – 16 July 2021) was a British foreign correspondent, television producer, and presenter. He worked for Reuters, The Daily Telegraph of London, and BBC Television, Radio News, and Current Affairs, covering, over 30 years, major stories and events, including 69 wars and revolutions, around the world. He had a wide range of experience in many areas of television broadcasting, development and management, and designing and producing global television events.

== Early life and education ==
Dring grew up in Fakenham, Norfolk, England, United Kingdom. He was expelled from boarding school in Woodbridge for midnight swimming in the River Deben. He then studied at King's Lynn Technical College. In 1962, at the age of 17, he left home and hitch-hiked overland across Europe and the Middle East, out to India and South-East Asia.

== Career ==
Dring got his first media job in early 1963, at the age of 18, working as a proofreader and feature writer for the Bangkok World newspaper in Thailand.

In 1964, at the age of 19, Dring was a freelance reporter for the London Daily Mail and The New York Times in Laos, before moving to Vietnam at the end of 1964, where he covered the war for two years for Reuters as their youngest staff correspondent at the time.

=== 'Bangladesh War of Independence' ===
On 25 March 1971, at the start of Operation Searchlight, Dring was hiding at the Hotel Intercontinental in Dhaka. After curfew was lifted on 27 March, he managed to escape the hotel and took a bike with the help of hotel staff. He visited places including Iqbal Hall of University of Dhaka, Rajarbagh Police Line and different other areas of Old Dhaka. He sent a report from his collection entitled "Tanks crushed Revolt in Pakistan" which was published on 30 March 1971. This report has created a significant awareness among the people regarding the Bangladesh War of Independence. He was forced to quit East Pakistan soon after the report was published. Pakistan Military government forced him to quit East Pakistan. He later came back to West Bengal in November 1971 and started covering regular news in a neutral matter during the course of the war. On 16 December 1971, he joined the combined Bangladesh Forces and Indian Army to reach to Bangladesh.

His journalistic career continued through the 1970s, 1980s, and 1990s as a staff correspondent for Reuters, The Daily Telegraph, and BBC TV News, as well as a freelance reporter and producer for, among others, The Sunday Times, Newsweek, and BBC Radio News. During this time Dring covered major stories and events throughout Europe, Africa, the Middle East, Asia and Latin America, including Vietnam, Laos, Cambodia, India, Pakistan, Bangladesh, Iran, Nigeria, Angola, Uganda, Eritrea, Cyprus (where he was seriously injured whilst reporting), Israel, Brazil, Croatia, Bosnia, and Georgia.

=== Sport Aid ===
In 1986, at the age of 41, Dring produced and helped design and organise (with Founder Chris Long and Bob Geldof) Sport Aid and The Race Against Time, still the biggest simultaneous mass-participation sporting event ever held and, at the time, the most complex live global television event ever produced. It raised over US$36 million for famine relief in Africa. More than 20 million people in 120 countries took part.

=== On The Road Again ===
In 1992, at the age of 47, Dring retraced his 1962 overland journey to India for BBC Radio 4 as a series entitled On The Road Again. The series was first broadcast in the summer of 1993 and repeated in 1994.

In 1994, at the age of 49, Dring repeated the journey again for an 8-part TV series of the same name for BBC Television and the Discovery Channel. Dring was accompanied on the six-month journey by Director/Cameraman Ron Orders, Recordist/Cameraman Sean Carswell, Production Manager Dan Laurie (Simon's nephew), and Production Co-ordinator Michelle Smith. They covered 29,000 kilometres (18,000 mi) in a Jeep and a Land Rover. Dring wrote a book to accompany the TV series, On The Road Again: Thirty Years On The Traveller's Trail To India (1995), which was published by BBC Books.

=== Ekushey Television ===
In 1997, Dring joined with partners in Bangladesh to develop, license, and build Ekushey Television, the first private, commercial terrestrial/satellite TV channel in Bangladesh. As Joint Managing Director of ETV (working with Farhad Mahmud, son of the ETV Chairman, the late A. S. Mahmud), Dring helped create a vision for ETV that was as much about news and education as it was about entertainment. He established what was, in effect, the first television news operation in the country with a team of more than 50 reporters, producers, and editors.

Within two years, ETV, with a staff of nearly 400 people, grew to become the biggest and most successful network in the country, attracting a national audience of more than 40 million, and many more internationally through its satellite transmissions. It was also financially profitable, with an annual turnover of US$12 million, growing at the rate of 30% per annum and creating jobs for more than 5,000 contractors. However, its considerable success was also its downfall and, despite national and international protest, elections in 2002 saw a new government move quickly to shut down ETV by the end of that year and revoked Dring's work permit in Bangladesh.

=== Jamuna Television ===
In 2014, he was chief broadcast consultant for the launch and management of Bangladeshi satellite channel Jamuna Television.

== Awards, commendations, and nominations ==
During his career, Dring has received the following Awards, Commendations and Honors:

- UK Reporter of the Year – for his eyewitness accounts in The Daily Telegraph of the massacres in Dhaka at the start of the Bangladesh Liberation War
- UK Television News Reporter of the Year – for his reports for BBC Television News from Eritrea, Zaire, and Iran
- International Reporter of the Year (Monte Carlo Television Festival "Golden Nymph Award" - shared with John Simpson) for his reporting of the Iranian Revolution for BBC Television News
- International Valiant For Truth - for his reporting from behind the lines with the EPLF guerrilla forces in Eritrea for BBC Television News & Current Affairs
- Amnesty International – for his radio documentary for BBC Radio 4 on Turkey's war against the Kurds (the PKK)
- The Sony Radio Awards - for his reporting for BBC Radio 4 of Turkey's War against the Kurds
- The New York Festival Grand Prize - for his BBC Radio 4 documentary on the US Invasion of Haiti
- He was respected with the title 'Friend of Bangladesh' due to his unforgettable heroism in representing the situation of Bangladesh to the world on the night of 25th March, Operation Searchlight in Dhaka.

== Personal life ==
Dring lived between Australia, the UK, and Romania with his partner, Fiona McPherson, an Australian human rights lawyer and Executive Director of a British children's charity in Romania. Their twin daughters were born in Brisbane in 2010. Dring has another daughter from a previous marriage who lives in Spain and has two sons (Dring's grandsons).

In July 2021, while undergoing a routine operation in Romania, Dring suffered a heart attack and was not revived, dying at the age of 76.
