= Deshe Bideshe =

Book by Syed Mujtaba Ali

Deshe Bideshe In A Land Far From Home
- Author: Syed Mujtaba Ali
- Translator: Nazes Afroz
- Language: Bengali
- Genre: Memoir, non-fiction
- Publisher: New Age Publishers Pvt. Ltd. Speaking Tiger Books (in English)
- Publication date: 1948
- Publication place: India
- English publication date: 2015
- ISBN: 978-9844060081

Deshe Bideshe (Bengali: দেশে বিদেশে) is the first book and one of the most famous works of Bengali author, journalist, travel enthusiast, academic, scholar and linguist Syed Mujtaba Ali. The book describes his experience on his stay in Kabul from 1927 to 1929 and was originally published serially during 1948 in the Indian weekly magazine Desh, New Age Publishers Pvt. Ltd. of Kolkata published it in book form the same year.

An English translation by Nazes Afroz, the former BBC executive editor of South and Central Asia, was published by Speaking Tiger Books as In a Land Far from Home in 2015. The book was shortlisted for the Raymond Crossword Book Award 2016.

== Plot ==
Syed Mujtaba Ali stayed in Kabul for one and a half years to work as a teacher and described his experience in Afghanistan in the book. The book shows his keen observations but written with a sense of humour.

== Characters ==
- Amanullah Khan
- Bacha-e-Saqao (Habibullah Kalakani)
- Muhammed
- Bolshov
- Ahmed Ali
- Amar Singh Bulani (Sardarji/Sikh Driver)
- Dost Muhammad
- Abdur Rahman
- Inayatullah Khan
