= Ekushey Television =

Bangladeshi television channel

Ekushey Television একুশে টেলিভিশন

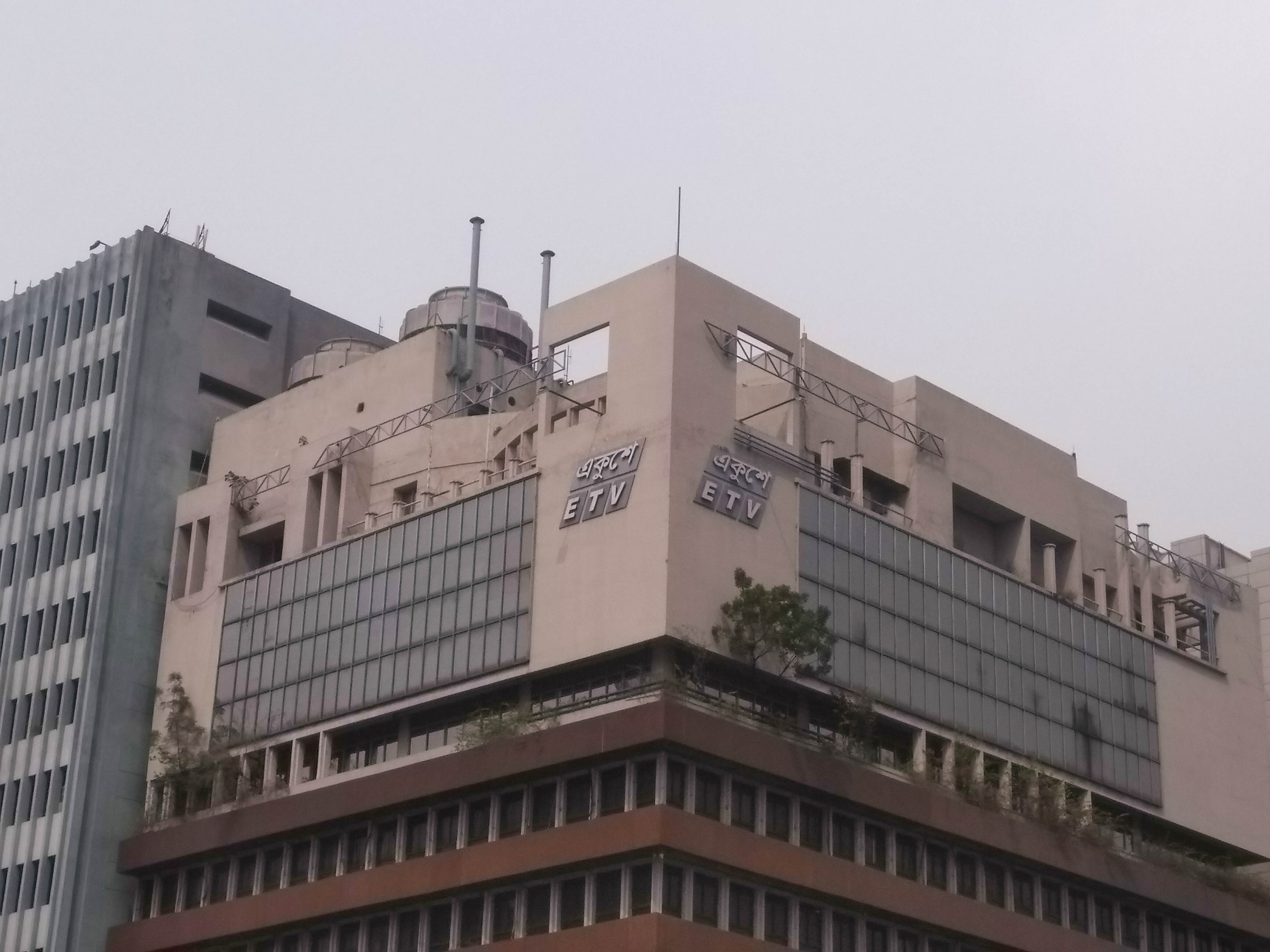
- The headquarters of Ekushey Television in Kawran Bazar
- Country: Bangladesh
- Broadcast area: Nationwide; Worldwide (via online)
- Headquarters: Kawran Bazar, Dhaka

Programming
- Picture format: 1080i HDTV (downscaled to 16:9 576i for SDTV sets)

Ownership
- Key people: Abdus Salam (chairman and CEO); Tasnova Mahbub Salam (vice chairman and managing director)

History
- Launched: 14 April 2000; 26 years ago (original); 29 March 2007; 19 years ago (relaunch)
- Founder: A. S. Mahmud; Simon Dring
- Closed: 29 August 2002; 23 years ago (original)

Links
- Website: ekushey-tv.com

Ekushey Television (Bengali: একুশে টেলিভিশন; lit. 'twenty-first', in reference to 21 February), also known by its acronym ETV, is a Bangladeshi Bengali-language privately owned satellite and cable television channel. It is headquartered in Kawran Bazar, Dhaka, and is Bangladesh's first privately owned television channel to broadcast news and current affairs programming.

Ekushey Television was launched on 14 April 2000 by A. S. Mahmud, with the "Poribortone Ongikarboddho" (পরিবর্তনে অঙ্গীকারবদ্ধ; lit. 'Committed to change') slogan, which is still used today, as a privately owned nationwide terrestrial television network, the first of its kind in Bangladesh and the region of South Asia in general. It quickly gained popularity around Bangladesh and became the most watched television network there. Ekushey also ended the government's monopoly on terrestrial television in the country.

Ekushey Television was later shut down in 2002 by the Bangladesh Nationalist Party-led government after being accused of telecasting news reports biased against them and operating under an "illegal" license. After gaining a license to resume their broadcasts in 2005, Ekushey returned to the air on 29 March 2007, exclusively on satellite and cable television, as they were unable to resume broadcasts on terrestrial.

Notable for being one of the country's earliest privately owned television channels, Ekushey Television had once dominated the Bangladeshi television market during its existence in terrestrial television. It had also committed to bringing change to the country and its society. Ekushey also broadcast worldwide, including to the United Kingdom via satellite for the Bangladeshi diaspora there, and in several other regions such as the rest of Europe, Southeast Asia, the Middle East, and the Indian state of West Bengal.

== History ==
=== 1997–2002: Original terrestrial launch ===
Plans for a privately owned terrestrial television network in Bangladesh date back to early 1997 when Farhad Mahmud, son of A.S. Mahmud, chatted with Simon Dring. Although privately owned channels in Bangladesh, which were ATN Bangla and Channel i, did exist at the time, they had no rights to broadcast on terrestrial television, and only Bangladesh Television had the authority to do so. However, in 1996, the government of Bangladesh came up with plans to launch a second nationwide television network that would broadcast on both terrestrial and satellite television, with the slot being offered to privately owned broadcasters.

The name 'Ekushey' was chosen because, according to Dring, it is an allusion to the Bengali language movement of 1952, which occurred on 21 February in that year, and the upcoming 21st century. In March 1999, Ekushey Television gained a fifteen-year license, allowing them to broadcast on terrestrial television. They were also allowed to use Bangladesh Television's facilities, the network's five earth stations, and share BTV's towers to broadcast. Initially, the channel was scheduled to commence its operations on 16 December 1999, which was victory day.

Eventually, Ekushey Television officially began transmissions on 14 April 2000, as the country's first privately owned terrestrial television network, broadcasting for twelve hours a weekday and seventeen hours on weekends. It covered half the country's population, and immediately gained popularity among locals. With its diverse range of programming, including news, culture, and entertainment, Ekushey Television managed to gain 40 million viewers, and claimed to be the most watched television network in Bangladesh. It had also helped with the prevention of the massive spread of Indian television channels in the country, which was happening since the Government of Bangladesh allowed satellite television in 1992.

Many of the popular television programs broadcast by Ekushey include Mukto Khabor, a news program involving young journalists, the soap opera Bandhan, and Deshjure, an infotainment program regarding the life of Bangladeshi people. Ekushey's news programming was also considered to be unbiased and reliable. Dring had described Ekushey Television as the window to the outside world for many Bangladeshis. Ekushey Television used the VHF band for broadcasting, and also used the facilities reserved for Bangladesh Television's second terrestrial television station, which were left unused.

In late 2001, the channel was made available in Qatari MMDS television operator Qatar Cablevision (owned by Qtel on a tailored package for South Asian immigrants.

==== License controversy and shutdown ====
In September 2000, two Dhaka University teachers and a pro-BNP journalist filed a suit, alleging that the agreement between Ekushey Television and the government of Bangladesh was unlawful. This claim was denied by the network. On 26 September 2001, Ekushey Television was ordered by the High Court of Bangladesh to temporarily halt broadcasts amid the upcoming general election, as they had ruled that the network had no proper rights to do so. Later, the Supreme Court overturned the order and Ekushey was allowed to resume broadcasting.

In March 2002, shortly after the BNP government of Bangladesh took over, the High Court declared that the license issued to Ekushey for broadcasting was "illegal". They were also accused of "unfairly" using the facilities of Bangladesh Television, and for being biased against the BNP and its Islamist allies, although Ekushey denied those claims and stated that their news programming was not politically aligned and was always neutral. The judges gave Ekushey ten days to appeal to the Supreme Court, otherwise they would have to cease broadcasts. Supporters of the network argued that Ekushey Television's license was granted by the previous rival Awami League government, and thus became the target of the BNP-led government.

On 29 August 2002, Ekushey Television was forced to cease all broadcasts at 17:00 (BST), with a formal announcement broadcast shortly before its closure, following a verdict from the Supreme Court that the license issued to the network was "illegal", after upholding the High Court's exact declaration and rejecting its appeal. The move to shut Ekushey Television down was protested by the RSF, and many people in Bangladesh gathered outside the court in solidarity with the network. The general-secretary of RSF, Robert Ménard, sent a letter to information minister Tariqul Islam, saying that the closure of ETV was "a dramatic backward step for viewers in Bangladesh".

After Ekushey's closure, the founder of the network, A.S. Mahmud, left Bangladesh for England with his family and later died there on 22 January 2004. Thus, Bangladesh Television once again remained the only Bangladeshi television network to broadcast on terrestrial television as of today. In October 2002, the work permits of Ekushey Television's Britain-based managing director Simon Dring and three other executives were cancelled by the government, and Dring was ordered to leave Bangladesh.

=== 2007: Ekushey's return to the air ===
On 14 April 2005, Ekushey Television, at the time under Abdus Salam's ownership, was granted a license to resume broadcasting using its previous facilities, after applying for it three months before, but were only allowed to do so via satellite television. They were also obliged to relay the nightly news bulletin of Bangladesh Television if they were to broadcast news programming. Ekushey commenced its satellite test transmissions on 1 December the following year. It officially resumed broadcasting on 29 March 2007, and started full-day transmissions on 1 June. On 23 August 2007, Ekushey Television and CSB News, with the latter ceasing operations a few days later, were warned by the military-backed government of Bangladesh to avoid airing any news or documentaries against them.

On 24 January 2008, Ekushey Television received a fax message, telling them to cancel the telecast of the channel's two popular live talk shows. This was part of the avoidance of talk shows aired on privately owned television channels ordered by the government at the time. On 6 January 2009, as Ekushey Television was caught allegedly broadcasting on terrestrial television in Chittagong illegally using a tower of BTCL, even after the government of Bangladesh ruled that no television channel would have authority to broadcast on terrestrial television other than BTV, local police shut the terrestrial transmission after the Chittagong station of Bangladesh Television filed a general diary against the network. The authorities of Ekushey, however, denied that they were broadcasting illegally on terrestrial, stating that they were testing terrestrial broadcasts.

In 2011, Ekushey Television became the first Bangladeshi television channel to live stream its content worldwide via its official website. The channel was considered to be the most popular television channel in Bangladesh due to its news and other innovative programming. On 12 March 2012, cable operators in many areas around Bangladesh have imposed a temporary blackout on Ekushey Television, along with the unrelated Banglavision, after both channels have reported on a BNP rally in detail. On 13 April 2013, Deutsche Welle's Bengali language science and technology television series, Onneshon, premiered on Ekushey Television.

On 5 January 2015, Ekushey Television abruptly halted transmissions without any notice in most areas around Bangladesh after airing a speech by the senior vice chairman of the Bangladesh Nationalist Party, Tarique Rahman. A sedition case was also filed as Rahman's speech was said to be "false, fabricated and instigating". It was also reported that Ekushey moved away from being progressive and has been airing controversial news reports since 2010. However, Ekushey's broadcasts overseas remained intact. The chairman of Ekushey, Abdus Salam, was subsequently arrested in a case filed under the Pornography Act of 2012, as the network allegedly aired a false report on a girl in one of their programs, Ekusher Chokh. Later, the channel resumed broadcasting in some areas, and resumed nationwide broadcasts over time.

=== 2015–2024: S. Alam era ===
On 25 November 2015, a media release issued by the network that day stated that S. Alam Group of Industries had acquired Ekushey, in an auction on 8 October. In observance of Eid al-Fitr in 2016, Ekushey aired ThunderCats for seven days, starting from the day of Eid. For the same occasion, the channel also broadcast seven films produced by Jaaz Multimedia following a press conference held between them at a hotel. In December 2016, Bangladeshi television professionals demanded Ekushey Television and three other local television channels to take dubbed foreign television series, which have gained popularity in the country, off their schedules. In July 2017, Ekushey Television, along with four other television channels in Bangladesh, signed an agreement with UNICEF to air children's programming for one minute.

On the morning of 26 November 2018, a fire broke out on the first few floors at the headquarters of Ekushey Television, with the estimated cost of damage being ৳260,000. On 15 February 2020, Chinese drama Turbulence of the Mu Clan premiered on Ekushey Television. One of the founders of the channel, Simon Dring, had died on 16 July 2021. On 17 January 2022, Iranian drama series Blue Whale debuted on Ekushey Television. A Bangabandhu Corner dedicated to Bangladesh's founding father, Sheikh Mujibur Rahman, was inaugurated at the headquarters of Ekushey on 20 June 2022. On 8 July 2024, Rabiul Hasan Avi was appointed as the new managing director and CEO of Ekushey Television, replacing Pijush Bandyopadhyay as the latter.

=== 2024–present: Return of Abdus Salam ===
Shortly after Sheikh Hasina's resignation following the non-cooperation movement on 5 August 2024, the former chairman and CEO of Ekushey Television, Abdus Salam, returned to the channel. He accused S. Alam of forcibly taking ownership of the channel using fraudulent documents under the direction of Hasina, after, as he claims, Ekushey Television exposed vote rigging and other irregularities during the 2014 general election, in order to curb free press. The channel was the titular sponsor of the twenty-third edition of the CJFB Performance Award held by the Cultural Journalists' Forum of Bangladesh on 28 December 2024. Ekushey later updated its motion graphics and look on 1 June 2025.

== Coverage ==
=== Terrestrial ===
Ekushey Television broadcast nationwide using VHF terrestrial signals during its first two years of existence until the network permanently ceased transmissions on terrestrial. The list below shows on which frequencies Ekushey was receivable in major areas around Bangladesh as of August 2002.

Receiving city	Channel no.
Dhaka	VHF 6
Khulna	VHF 8
Chittagong	VHF 9
Natore	VHF 11
Rangpur	VHF 11
Sylhet	VHF 11

== Programming ==
Ekushey Television is a mixed entertainment television channel, broadcasting a variety of programming. Its programming line consists of drama, news, music, television films, theatrically released films, and others. Initially broadcasting for twelve hours a weekday and seventeen hours on weekends, Ekushey broadcasts on a full-day basis. During its anniversaries, Ekushey aired documentaries regarding the history of the channel. On 1 October 2024, Ekushey Television refreshed its news schedules, as stated in a press release published a day prior, with hourly news bulletins being broadcast at zero-hour.

== Controversies ==
In 2012, Ekushey Television was accused by the Bangladesh Telecommunication Regulatory Commission of broadcasting illegally without a radio equipment license and with its withheld frequency. Ekushey, however, denied the claims by stating that they have a radio equipment license and an updated frequency, and they were also regularly paying their frequency and license fees. The chairman of the channel, Abdul Salam, stated that Ekushey was being a victim of a minister's "conspiracy".

On 26 January 2015, the Anti-Corruption Commission filed a case against Abdus Salam, along with two others, for allegedly laundering ৳2,670,000. Another case was filed against Salam on 2 March 2016, after an allegation that he made fraudulent documents of the satellite charge of Ekushey to swindle out ৳340,000,000. Charges against him and the two others accused were finalized in March 2018.

== See also ==
- List of television stations in Bangladesh
