= Syed Mujtaba Ali =

Bengali author and scholar (1904–1974)

- সৈয়দ মুজতবা আলী
- Pronunciation: [soi̯̯ɔd̪ mud͡ʒt̪ɔba‿ali]
- Born: 13 September 1904; Karimganj, Sylhet, North-East Frontier, British Raj (now Sribhumi, Barak Valley, Assam, India)
- Died: 11 February 1974 (aged 69); Dacca, Bangladesh
- Burial place: Azimpur Cemetery
- Occupations: Writer; journalist; teacher; traveller; academician; linguist
- Years active: 1949–1974
- Works: Bibliography
- Spouse: Rabia Khatun (m. 1951; died 1974)
- Children: Syed Musharraf Ali; Syed Zaghlul Ali
- Parents: Khan Bahadur Syed Sikandar Ali (father); Amtul Mannan Khatun (mother)
- Relatives: Syed Murtaza Ali (brother); Syed Mohammad Ali (nephew); Syed Muazzem Ali (nephew); Shegufta Bakht Chaudhuri (nephew)
- Awards: Full list

Academic background
- Education: Visva-Bharati University (BA); Aligarh Muslim University; University of Bonn (PhD); Al-Azhar University
- Thesis: The Origin of the K͟hojāhs and Their Religious Life Today (1936)
- Influences: Rabindranath Tagore; Bidhushekhar Shastri; Formici; Bogdanov; Moriz Winternitz; Mark Collins; Giuseppe Tucci

Academic work
- Discipline: Multilingual studies; philosophy; comparative religion; Islamic studies
- Institutions: Kabul Agricultural College (1927–1929); Maharaja Sayajirao University of Baroda (1936–1944); Government Azizul Haque College (1949); University of Calcutta (1950); Visva-Bharati University (1956–1964)
- Writing career
- Language: Bengali; English
- Period: Contemporary
- Genre: Travelogue
- Notable works: Deshe Bideshe, Shabnam, Panchatantra, Chacha Kahini

Syed Mujtaba Ali (Note: Bengali: সৈয়দ মুজতবা আলী, romanized: Sôiẏôd Mujtôba Ali, pronounced [soi̯̯ɔd̪ mud͡ʒt̪ɔba‿ali]) (Bengali: সৈয়দ মুজতবা আলী, pronounced [ˈsoi̯̯ɔd̪ ˈmud͡ʒt̪ɔbaˑ‿ˈaliˑ]; 13 September 1904 – 11 February 1974) was a Bengali writer, journalist, travel enthusiast, academic, scholar and linguist. He lived in Bangladesh, India, Germany, Afghanistan and Egypt.

== Early life and education ==
Syed Mujtaba Ali Khandakar was born on 13 September 1904 to a Bengali Muslim Syed family of Khandakars in Karimganj, Sylhet district, British Raj. His father, Khan Bahadur Syed Sikander Ali, was a sub-registrar. He traced his paternal descent to Shah Syed Ahmed Mutawakkil, a Sufi Pir and a Syed of Taraf, though apparently unrelated to Taraf's ruling Syed dynasty. Ali's mother, Amatul Mannan Khatun, belonged to the Chowdhuries of Kala and Bahadurpur, a Muslim branch of the Pal family of Panchakhanda. His paternal family's ancestral home is Khandakar Bari in Uttarsur Village of Bahubal Upazila of Habiganj District. Mujtaba was the youngest of three brothers, one of whom being the writer Syed Murtaza Ali.

Ali completed his matriculation at Sylhet Government Pilot High School but reportedly did not pass his intermediate examination from MC College. In 1919 when Rabindranath Tagore was visiting Sylhet, Mujtaba Ali met Tagore who had great influence on Mujtaba Ali's writings. Later, in 1921 Mujtaba joined the Indian freedom struggle and left his school in Sylhet after some Hindu students were punished from taking flowers from the District Commissioners house for Puja. In the same year 1921, he went to Visva-Bharati University in Santiniketan and graduated in 1926 with B.A. degree. He was among the first graduates of the Visva-Bharati. He studied for a brief period in Aligarh Muslim University. Later, he moved to Kabul to work in the Education Department (1927–1929) as a professor. He left Afghanistan following Habibullāh Kalakāni taking control of Kabul during the Afghan Civil War (1928–1929). His name was struck off the evacuation list by Francis Humphrys, first British Minister to the Amir of Afghanistan, Amānullāh Khān, after he criticized the airlifting of Europeans before British Indian citizens.

From 1929 to 1932, Ali went to Germany with the Wilhelm Humboldt scholarship and studied at the universities in Berlin and later in Bonn. He earned his PhD from the University of Bonn with a dissertation on comparative religious studies on Khojas in 1932.

== Career ==
Ali then studied at the Al-Azhar University in Cairo during 1934–1935. He taught at a college in Baroda from 1936 until 1944, and in 1949 was principal of Government Azizul Haque College in Bogra, East Bengal.

After the Partition of India into India and Pakistan in 1947, Ali went from India to the then East Pakistan. He was one of the first to call for Bangla as East Pakistan's state language on 30 November 1947, at the Sylhet Kendriya Muslim Sahitya Samsad. He was a prominent activist and supporter of Bengali as the national language of East Pakistan. In 1948, being the principal of Azizul Huq College, Bogra, he wrote an essay, 'The State Language of East Pakistan', which was printed in Chaturanga of Kolkata. During that time, the West Pakistan Rulers tried to impose Urdu as the only state language of East Pakistan while Bengali was spoken by most of the people. The government of Pakistan demanded an explanation. But Ali resigned and moved to India.

Ali slipped back to India in August 1949, tipped off by a friend, according to Abul Maal Abdul Muhith, that Pakistani authorities intended to arrest him for his vocal support of the Bengali language movement.

After a brief stint at University of Calcutta in 1950, Ali became Secretary of the Indian Council for Cultural Relations and editor of its Arabic journal Thaqafatul Hind. From 1952 to 1956 he worked for All India Radio at New Delhi, Cuttack and Patna. He then joined Visva-Bharati University (1956–1964) as professor of German language and later of Islamic Culture. He lived in Kolkata till early 1972. Following the liberation of Bangladesh, he moved to Dhaka to live with his family until his death in 1974.

== Linguistic abilities and literary works ==
Ali's mother tongue was Sylheti-Bengali, but he also could speak standard Bengali, English, Russian, French, German, Italian, Arabic, Persian, Urdu, Hindi, Sanskrit, Marathi, Gujarati, and Pashtu. Alongside Natya Guru Nurul Momen and Jajabar (Binay Mukhopadhyay), Ali was one of the trail-blazers of a unique category of Bengali writing. 'Ramya Rachana' in the Bengali language, an anecdotal story-telling – often based on real-life experiences – became immensely popular, mostly because of the attractive writing style of Ali. Deshe Bideshe, the story of his journey to and experiences in Kabul during his brief stint as professor in a college there is one of Ali's best works. Panchatantra is a collection of thoughts and short stories (some already published in 'Desh' magazine) of his days in Europe, Cairo and Baroda.

== Bibliography ==
1. Deshe Bideshe (1949)
2. Panchatantra (1952)
3. Abishwasya (1955)
4. Chacha Kahini (1955)
5. Mayurkanthi (1957)
6. Jale Dangay (1957)
7. Dhupchhaya (1958)
8. Shabnam (1960)
9. Chaturanga (1960)
10. Shreshtha Galpa (1962)
11. Parash Pathar (1962)
12. Bahubichitra (1962)
13. Bhabaghure O Anyanya (1962)
14. Shreshtha Ramya Rachana (1962)
15. Tunimem (1964)
16. Duhara (1966)
17. Pachandashai (1967)
18. Shahriyar (1969)
19. Hitler (1970)
20. Kato Na Ashrujal (1971)
21. Musafir (1971)
22. Prem
23. Dwandwa Madhur
24. Tulanahina
25. Raja Ujir
26. Chalak Hobar Pahela Kitab

== Personal life ==
Ali married Rabeya Khatun in 1951, a match arranged by his sisters. She served as the headmistress of Sarkari Agragami Girls' High School in 1948. They have two sons, Syed Mosharraf Ali Feroz and Syed Jaglul Ali Bhoju.

== Death and legacy ==
In 1972, after the Independence of Bangladesh, Ali returned to Bangladesh. He died on 11 February 1974. Extracts from his literary works are included in the curriculum of school level, secondary, higher secondary and graduation level Bengali Literature in both Bangladesh and India, particularly in the states of West Bengal and Tripura. He was awarded Ekushey Padak, the second highest civilian award in Bangladesh in 2005 by the Government of Bangladesh.

== Awards ==
- Narsinghadas Prize (1949)
- Ananda Puraskar (1961) awarded by Anandabazar Group
- Ekushey Padak (2005) by the Government of Bangladesh
