= Jochona O Jononir Golpo =

Novel by Humayun Ahmed

Jochona O Jononir Golpo জোছনা ও জননীর গল্প
- Author: Humayun Ahmed
- Cover artist: Masum Rahman
- Language: Bengali
- Subject: Liberation war of Bangladesh
- Genre: Novel
- Published: February 2004
- Publisher: Anyaprakash
- Publication place: Bangladesh
- Media type: printed (Hardcover)
- Pages: 527 (first published)
- ISBN: 9-848-68276-7

Jochna O Jononir Golpo (Bengali: জোছনা ও জননীর গল্প, transl. A tale of moonlight and mother) is a novel by Humayun Ahmed. The novel was published in February, 2004. The novel is based on the Liberation War of Bangladesh. In the novel, by means of an engrossing fictional story which skilfully incorporates various historical figures and many true incidents as well as the author's own personal experiences. The novel was translated into English as Liberation: Josna O Jononir Golpo by Roger Gwynn. In this fiction, Humayun Ahmed used data from 93 referencial books.

== Plot ==
The story of the novel starts in month of February 1971, when the Arabic teacher of Nilgonj High School, Mawlana Irtazuddin Kashempuri visits his younger brother Shahed and his family in Dhaka. Then the writer describes various stories of the characters. He describes how Mawlana Irtazuddin became a contradictor. How he swore not to perform Jummah Salat until Bangladesh become independent, for which he was shot by Pakistani Military. The writer describes how Shahed searched for his lost wife and daughter. He described the time as "The day and night of uncertainty".

== Characters ==
=== Characters taken from real life ===
- Sheikh Mujibur Rahman – Father of the nation of Bangladesh
  - Family of Sheikh Mujibur Rahman
- Ziaur Rahman – Chief of the Z Force
  - Family of Ziaur Rahman
- Abdul Hamid Khan Bhasani– One of the grassroots politicians of twentieth century British India
- Ayub Khan – Pakistani army ruler
- Yahya Khan – Pakistani army ruler
- Tikka Khan – Member of Pakistan Army
- Zulfikar Ali Bhutto – Pakistani politician
- Shamsur Rahman – poet
- Abdul Kader Siddique – is the head of the Kaderia force (Kadeia Bahini)
- Humayun Ahmed – The author and narrate his own wartime events in the novel
  - Faizur Rahman Ahmed – Sub-divisional police chief and father of Humayun Ahmed
  - Ayesha Begum – Wife of Sub-Divisional Police Chief Faizur Rahman and mother of Humayun Ahmed
  - Muhammad Zafar Iqbal – Professor, Novelist; the second son of Faizur Rahman and brother of Humayun Ahmed
  - Humayun Ahmed's family
  - Rashid – Faizur Rahman's handfan puller
  - Anis Sabet – Friend of Humayun Ahmed
- And others.

=== Fictional characters ===
- Shahed – is also a real character but in the novel the writer adds imagination to the truth
- Irtazuddin – Shahed's elder brother
- Asmani – Shahed's wife
- Runi – Shahed's daughter
- Gouranga – Shahed's friend
- Mubarak Hossain – Naimul's father-in-law and police inspector
- Naimul – Shahid's friend and freedom fighter
- Maryam – Naimul's wife and daughter of Mubarak Hossain
- Kalimullah – poet and collaborator for the Pakistani Military
- And others.

== See also ==
- Deyal
