= Shonkhonil Karagar =

Shonkhonil Karagar may refer to:

- Shonkhonil Karagar (novel), a 1973 novel by Humayun Ahmed
- Shonkhonil Karagar (film), a 1992 Bangladeshi Bengali-language film, based on the novel
