= Ahsan Habib =

Ahsan Habib may refer to:

- Ahsan Habib (poet) (1917–1986), Bangladeshi poet
- Ahsan Habib (cartoonist) (born 1957), Bangladeshi cartoonist
