= Nondito Noroke =

- Author: Humayun Ahmed
- Original title: নন্দিত নরকে
- Cover artist: Qayyum Chowdhury
- Language: Bengali
- Genre: Novel
- Published: 1972
- Publisher: Khan Brothers and Co.
- Publication place: Bangladesh
- Pages: 70
- Followed by: Shonkhonil Karagar

Nondito Noroke (Bengali: নন্দিত নরকে, lit. 'Nondito Noroke' "In Blissful Hell") is a 1972 novel by Bangladeshi author Humayun Ahmed. Ahmed wrote this debut novel in 1970 while he was an undergraduate student at the University of Dhaka. Ahmed Sharif wrote the introduction of the book.

A theatrical play was adopted with the original book title in 1975 by 'Bahubachan'.

The book was made into the 2006 film with the original book title, starring Ferdous Ahmed, Litu Anam, Khairul Alam Sabuj, Monir Khan Shimul, Sumona Shoma. The film was directed by Belal Ahmed.

Nondito Noroke
- Poster
- নন্দিত নরকে
- Directed by: Belal Ahmed
- Written by: Humayun Ahmed
- Based on: Nondito Noroke by Humayun Ahmed
- Produced by: Didarul Alam Badal
- Starring: Ferdous Ahmed; Litu Anam; Khairul Alam Sabuj; Monir Khan Shimul; Sumona Shoma; Jyotika Jyoti; Keramat Moula
- Cinematography: Mahfuzur Rahman Khan
- Edited by: Belal Ahmed
- Music by: Emon Saha
- Release date: January 27, 2006
- Country: Bangladesh
- Language: Bengali

== Characters ==
- Rabeya
- Khoka
- Montu
- Runu
- Khoka, Rabeya and Montu's father
- Khoka, Rabeya and Montu's mother
- Master Chacha
- Haroon
- Advocate

== Film cast ==
- Ferdous Ahmed as Khoka
- Litu Anam as Montu
- Khairul Alam Sabuj as Khoka, Rabeya and Montu's Father
- Monir Khan Shimul as Haroon
- Sumona Shoma as Rabeya
- Jyotika Jyoti as Runu
- Afroza Banu as Khoka, Rabeya and Montu's Mother
- Keramat Moula as Master Chacha
- Amir Shirazi as Advocate
