= Rawshan Ara Mustafiz =

Rawshan Ara Mustafiz রওশন আরা মুস্তাফিজ
- Genres: Nazrul Sangeet
- Spouse: Mostafizur Rahman

Rawshan Ara Mustafiz is a Bangladeshi singer of Nazrul Sangeet genre. She was awarded Ekushey Padak in 2006 by the Government of Bangladesh.

== Early life and career ==
Mustafiz learned music from her mother Rashida Khatun Chowdhury and started to perform in children's programs on radio at the age of six. She wrote a book on music titled Shurer Bhubon for learners.

Mustafiz got her breakthrough when her songs O Madhobi Thako Mor Ontorey and Brihoshpoti Amar Ekhon Tunggey aired on Bangladesh Television. In the 1970s, she focussed on Nazrul songs as well as classical music on Bangladesh Betar and Bangladesh Television. She trained under Ustad Yusuf Khan Koraishi, Ustad Gul Mohammad Khan and others.

Mustafiz is a trustee member of Nazrul Institute.

== Personal life ==
Rawshan was married to Mostafizur Rahman (d. 2026), a television personality. Their elder son, Rana Mostafiz, lives in Toronto, Canada, and younger son, Abhi Mostafiz, in Sydney, Australia.

== Awards ==
- Ekushey Padak (2006)
- Nazrul Academy Award (2009)
- Nazrul Institute Gold Medal
- Shilpaklala Academy Award

== Works ==
- Tomar Hatey Shonar Rakhi (2005)
