= Humayun Ahmed =

Bangladeshi author and filmmaker (1948–2012)

- হুমায়ূন আহমেদ
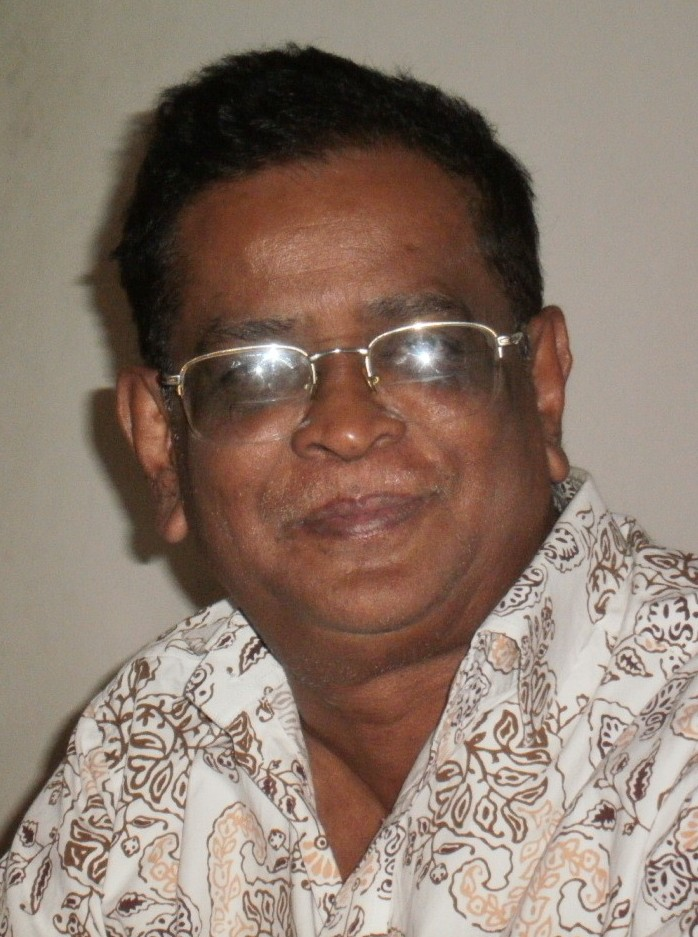
- Ahmed in 2010
- Pronunciation: [humai̯un aɦmed̪]
- Born: Shamsur Rahman; 13 November 1948; Mohanganj, East Bengal, Pakistan (now Bangladesh)
- Died: 19 July 2012 (aged 63); New York City, U.S.
- Resting place: Nuhash Palli, Pirujali, Gazipur, Bangladesh
- Other name: Kajal
- Occupations: Novelist; short story writer; playwright; lyricist; screenwriter; filmmaker; academic
- Years active: 1972–2012
- Works: Bibliography; filmography
- Partners: Gultekin Khan (m. 1976; div. 2004); Meher Afroz Shaon (m. 2004; died 2012)
- Children: 7, including Shila and Nuhash
- Father: Faizur Rahman Ahmed
- Relatives: Muhammad Zafar Iqbal (brother); Ahsan Habib (brother); Asif Nazrul (son-in-law); Tahura Ali (mother-in-law)
- Awards: Full list
- Writing career
- Language: Bengali
- Period: Modern
- Genres: Novel; short story; sci-fi; mystery fiction; detective fiction; paranormal fiction; fantasy; magic realism; historical fiction; children's literature; drama; memoir; travelogue; essay
- Notable works: Nondito Noroke; Shonkhonil Karagar; Himu series; Misir Ali series; Shuvro series; Jochona O Jononir Golpo; Deyal
- Notable awards: Bangla Academy Literary Award (1981); Ekushey Padak (1994)

Academic background
- Education: Bogra Zilla School (Matriculation, 1965); Dhaka College (Intermediate, 1967); University of Dhaka (BSc, 1970; MSc, 1972); North Dakota State University (PhD, 1982)
- Doctoral advisor: J. Edward Glass

Academic work
- Discipline: Chemistry
- Sub-discipline: Polymer chemistry
- Institutions: Bangladesh Agricultural University (1973–1974); University of Dhaka (1974–mid 1990s)

Humayun Ahmed (Note: Bengali: হুমায়ূন আহমেদ, pronounced [humai̯un aɦmed̪].) (Bengali: হুমায়ূন আহমেদ, pronounced [humai̯un aɦmed̪]; 13 November 1948 – 19 July 2012) was a Bangladeshi novelist, dramatist, screenwriter, filmmaker, songwriter, scholar, and academic. His breakthrough was his debut novel Nondito Noroke published in 1972. He wrote over 200 fiction and non-fiction books and is regarded as one of the most popular authors and filmmakers in post-independence Bangladesh.

In the early 1990s, Humayun Ahmed emerged as a filmmaker. He went on to make a total of eight films – all adapted from his own novels. His films include Daruchini Dip, Aguner Poroshmoni, Srabon Megher Din, Shonkhonil Karagar, Dui Duari, Shyamol Chhaya and Ghetuputra Komola. He won the National Film Awards a record seven times in directing, screenplay and story for the films Ghetuputra Komola, Aguner Poroshmoni, Shonkhonil Karagar, Daruchini Dwip and Anil Bagchir Ekdin. He also won the Bangla Academy Literary Award in 1981 and the Ekushey Padak in 1994 for his contribution to the Bengali literature.

Widely considered one of the cornerstones in modern Bengali literature, his works are characterized by non-violence, realistic storylines, family drama, and humor styles. His films Shyamol Chhaya and Ghetuputra Komola were submitted for the 78th Academy Awards and 85th Academy Awards respectively in the Best Foreign Language Film category.

== Early life and background ==
Ahmed was born on 13 November 1948, in the Moulvi Bari of Kutubpur in Netrokona mahakuma, (Note: Current Netrokona district region was a mahakuma under Mymensingh District during 1882–1984.) which was then a part of the Mymensingh district of East Bengal in the Dominion of Pakistan (now Bangladesh). His mother, Ayesha Foyez (née Khatun) (1930–2014), was a housewife. His father, Faizur Rahman Ahmed (1921–1971), was a sub-divisional police officer in Pirojpur District and was killed in 1971 during the Bangladesh Liberation War. His grandfather, Azimuddin Ahmed, was the son of the Sufi pir Jahangir Munshi. Humayun's brother, Muhammad Zafar Iqbal, is a writer and academician. Another brother, Ahsan Habib, is a cartoonist. He had three sisters – Sufia Haider, Momtaz Shahid and Rukhsana Ahmed.

During his childhood, Humayun Ahmed lived in Sylhet, Comilla, Chittagong, Bogra, Dinajpur and where his father was on official assignment.

== Education and early career ==
Ahmed studied in Chittagong Collegiate School. He passed the SSC examination from Bogura Zilla School in 1965. He then passed HSC from Dhaka College. Humayun Ahmed earned his bachelor's and master's degrees in Chemistry from the University of Dhaka. He joined as a faculty member of the same university. Later he earned his PhD in polymer chemistry from North Dakota State University. He returned to Bangladesh and taught in the department of chemistry in University of Dhaka for several more years

== Works ==
=== Novels ===
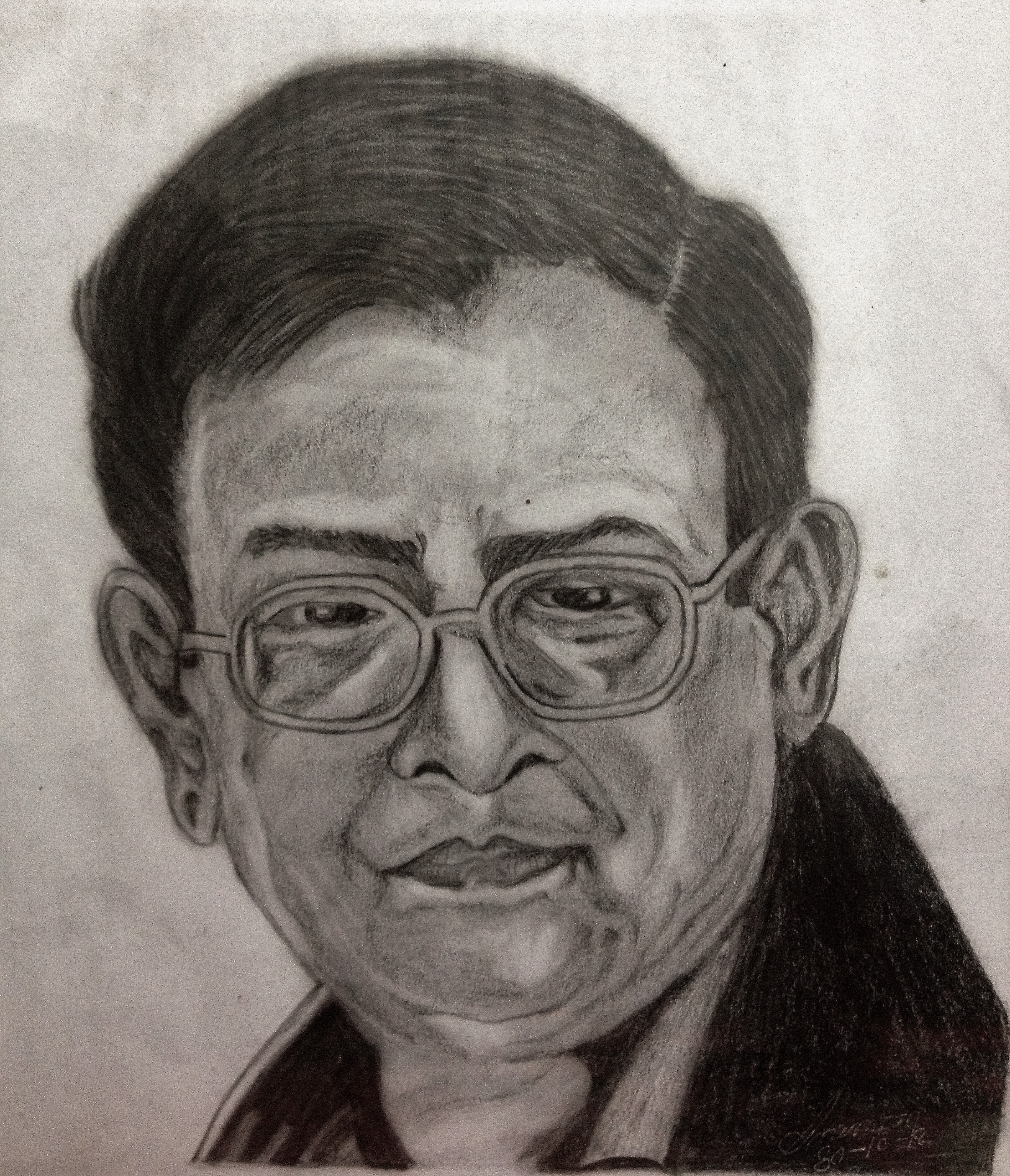
Pencil sketch of Humayun Ahmed

Ahmed wrote his debut novel Nondito Noroke (In Blissful Hell) during the 1971 Bangladesh independence war while he was a university student. The novel was published in 1972 by the initiative of writer Ahmed Sofa under Khan Brother's Publishers. From his very first novel, his themes included the aspirations of average middle-class urban families and portrayed quintessential moments of their lives. His second novel was Shonkhonil Karagar.

Ahmed wrote fictional series featuring recurring characters such as Himu (21 novels), Misir Ali (19 novels and 11 short stories), Shuvro (6 novels) Other important non-recurring characters are Baker Bhai, Tuni and more. He wrote several novels based on the Bangladesh Liberation War – Aguner Poroshmoni, Matal Hawa, Paap, 1971, Jochona O Jononir Golpo., and Deyal. He also wrote many romantic novels including Srabon Megher Din, Badol Diner Prothom Kodom Phool, Noboni, Krishnopoksho, Aj Dupure Tomar Nimontran, and Tumi Amai Dekechhile Chhutir Nimontrane. His novel Gouripur Junction was translated in nine languages.

Ahmed wrote autobiographies, Amar Chelebela, Ballpoint, Fountain Pen, Hiji-biji, Hotel Graver Inn, May Flower, Kath Pencil, Lilabotir Mrityu, New York-er Nil Akashe Jhokjhoke Rod and Rong Pencil.

=== Television and film ===
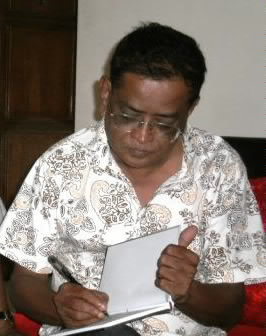
Ahmed signing books (2010)

Ahmed's first television drama was Prothom Prohor (1983), directed by Nawazish Ali Khan. His first drama serial was Ei Shob Din Ratri (1985). This was followed by the comedy series Bohubrihi (1988), the historical drama series Ayomoy (1988), the urban drama series Kothao Keu Nei (1990), Nokkhotrer Raat (1996), and Aaj Robibar (1996). In addition, he made single episode dramas, most notably Nimful (1997). Recurring characters in dramas directed and screenplayed by him are Tara Tin Jon and Alauddiner Cherager Doitto.

Ahmed directed films based on his own stories. His first film, Aguner Poroshmoni (1994), based on the Bangladesh Liberation War, won the 19th Bangladesh National Film Awards in a total of eight categories, including the awards for the Best Film and the Best Director. Another film Shyamal Chhaya (2005) was also based on the same war. His last directed film, Ghetuputra Kamola (2012), the story of a teenage boy, was set in the British colonial period.

Shyamol Chhaya and Ghetuputra Kamola were selected as the Bangladeshi entries for the Academy Award for Best Foreign Language Film in 2006 and 2012 respectively, but were not nominated.

In 2009, Ahmed appeared as one of two judges for the reality television music competition show Khude Gaanraj.

Actor Affan Mitul debuted with his drama Nuruddin Swarna Padak. It was produced and directed by Humayun Ahmed himself.

=== Music ===
Ahmed composed around 40 songs which he used in his films and television dramas. The songs were based on the folk music of the north-eastern part of Bangladesh. His notable singles include "Ekta Chhilo Shonar Konya", "Pubali Batashey", "O Amar Ural Ponkhi Rey", "Jodi Mon Kadey", "Ke Porailo Amar Chokh-e Kolonko Kajol", "Chadni Poshor Raite Ke Anay Shoron Kore", "Ami Aaj Bhejabo Chokh Somudrer Joley", "Cholona Brishtitey Bhiji", "Channi Poshor Raite Jeno Amar Moron Hoy", "Hablonger Bajarey Giya", "Boroshar Prothom Dine", Thikana Amar Notebook E Ache", "Baje Bongshi", "Aaj Jorir Biye", "Cholo Na Jai", "Chika Maro" and "Konya Nachilo Rey" etc. The songs were rendered by Subir Nandi, Selim Chowdhury, S I Tutul, Meher Afroz Shaon, Sabina Yasmin, Agun, Kuddus Boyati and others. In his most films and TV dramas, the music composer was Maksud Jamil Mintu.

=== Critical response ===
Nobel laureate economist Muhammad Yunus assessed Ahmed's overall impact saying: "Humayun's works are the most profound and most fruitful that literature has experienced since the time of Tagore and Nazrul." Similarly, according to poet Al Mahmud, "one golden age of Bengali literature ended with Tagore and Nazrul and another began with Ahmed". Writer Imdadul Haq Milan considered him to be "the almighty lord of Bengali literature, controlling all their actions and thoughts". Dawn, Pakistan's oldest and most widely read English-language newspaper, referred to him as the cultural legend of Bangladesh. Times of India credited Humayun as "the person who single-handedly shifted the capital of Bengali literature from Kolkata to Dhaka".

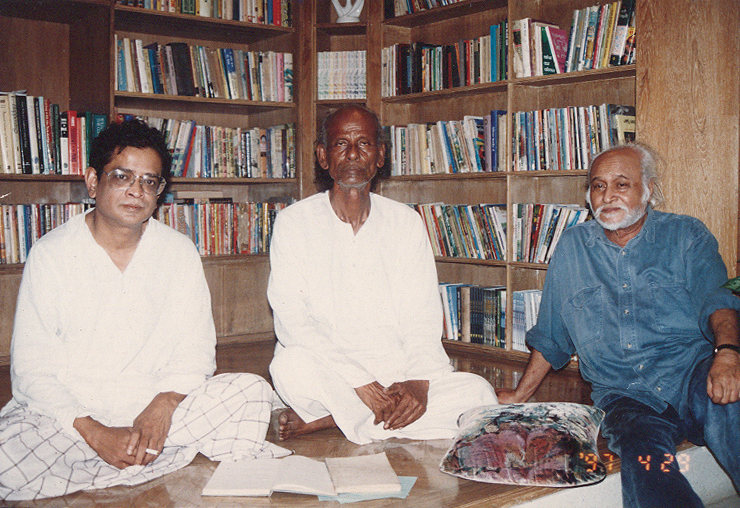
Humayun Ahmed, Shah Abdul Karim and Abul Khayer in 1996.

Sunil Gangopadhyay described him as the most popular writer in the Bengali language for a century and according to him, Ahmed was even more popular than Sarat Chandra Chattopadhyay. However, during his lifetime author Shahriar Kabir dismissed him for "always speaking for the establishment." Literary critic Azfar Hussain said: "I am not surprised he talks like a pro-establishment writer. I find him ignorant."

=== Controversy ===
On 11 May 2012, two chapters of Ahmed's future novel Deyal were published in the daily Prothom Alo. 3 days later, Attorney General of Bangladesh Mahbubey Alam drew attention of the High Court on a discrepancy about a detail of the historical event of killing Sheikh Russel in Ahmed's writing. The court later issued a suo moto rule and asked the authorities to provide Ahmed copies of relevant documents and judgements of the killing case, so that Ahmed could rectify the writing.

== Personal life ==
Ahmed married Gultekin Khan in 1973. Together they had three daughters, Bipasha Ahmed (born early 1980s), Shila Ahmed (born early 1980s), Dr. Nova Ahmed (born late 1970s) and one son, Nuhash Humayun (born 1 January 1992). Shila went on to become a television and film actress, Nova is a professor at the ECE department at North South University, and Nuhash became a writer, film director, and producer. Bipasha also acted in a supporting role in Nokkhotrer Raat and starred in Mayaboti. On 6 June 2004, Ahmed divorced Gultekin. He then married actress Meher Afroz Shaon in 2004. He had two sons from the second marriage, Nishad Humayun (born mid 2000s) and Ninith Humayun (born early 2010s). He later had a daughter, Lilaboti, who suffered a neonatal death. A lake in Nuhash Palli was named after her.

Ahmed was a Sunni Muslim, and he described the Islamic scholar Muhiuddin Khan as his father figure.

== Death ==
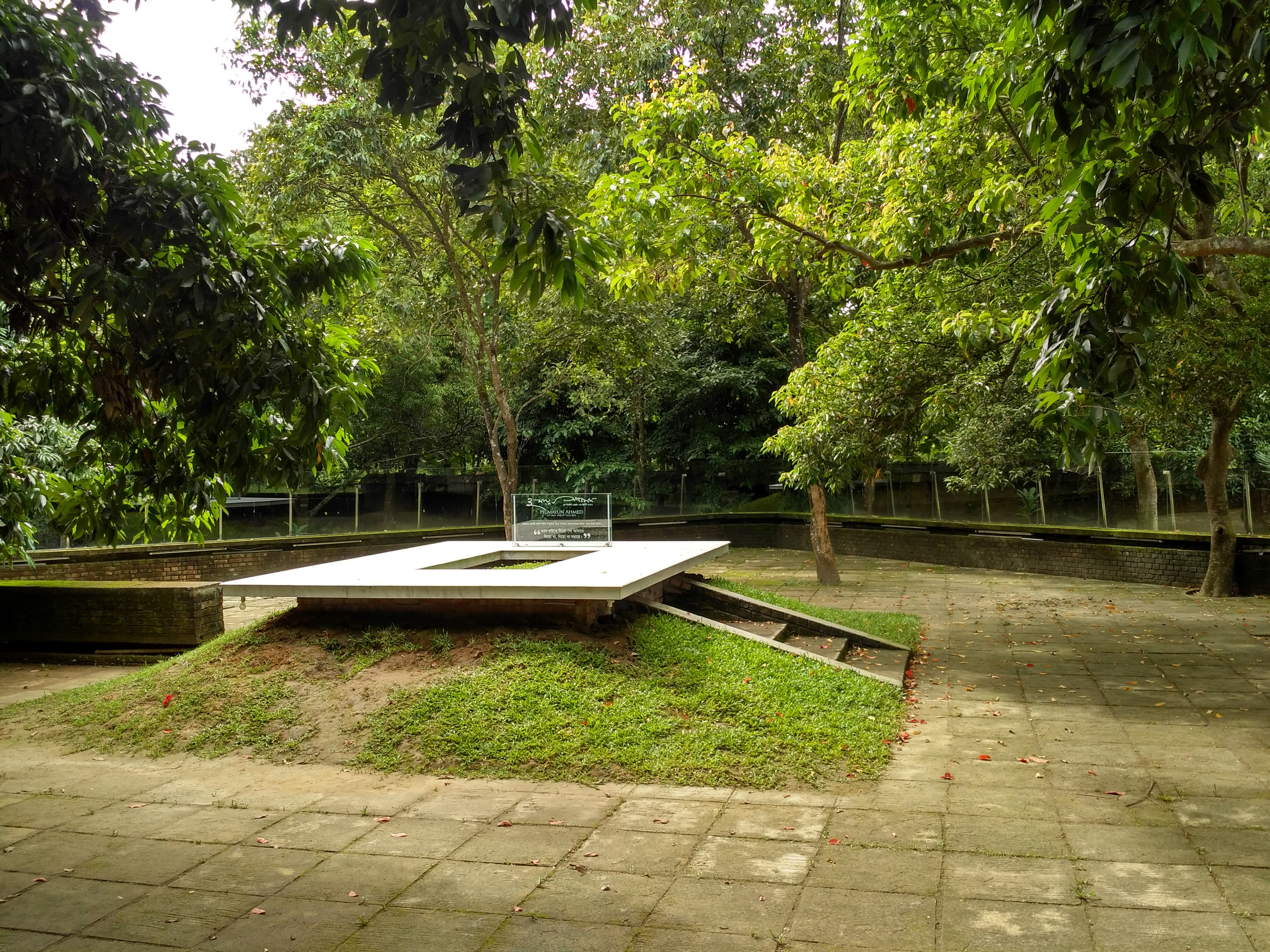
Grave of Humayun Ahmed at Nuhash Palli

Ahmed had open-heart surgery at Mount Elizabeth Hospital in Singapore. A few years later, during a routine checkup, doctors found a cancerous tumor in his colon. On 14 September 2011, he was flown to Memorial Sloan–Kettering Cancer Center in New York City for treatment. During his stay there, he wrote the novel, Deyal, based on the life of Sheikh Mujibur Rahman and Ziaur Rahman after the period of Bangladesh Liberation War. In January 2011, he was appointed as a senior special adviser of the Bangladesh Mission to the United Nations.

On 12 May 2012, Ahmed returned to Bangladesh for two weeks. He died on 19 July 2012, at 11:20pm BST at Bellevue Hospital in New York City. There was some tension in the family over the selection of his burial site, but eventually his estate, Nuhash Palli was selected.

== Legacy ==
In recognition of the works of Humayun, The Times of India wrote, "Humayun was a custodian of the Bangladeshi literary culture whose contribution single-handedly shifted the capital of Bengali literature from Kolkata to Dhaka without any war or revolution." and entitled him "The Shakespeare of Bangladesh". Sunil Gangopadhyay described him as the most popular writer in the Bengali language for a century, and according to him (Sunil), Humayun Ahmed was even more popular than Sarat Chandra Chattopadhyay. His works, such as Kothao Keu Nei, Aaj Robibar, and Bohubrihi, are still considered relevant by fans and critics. Many Bangladeshi filmmakers are still inspired by his works. Humayun Ahmed's books have been the top sellers at the Ekushey Book Fair during every year of the 1990s and 2000s.

Exim Bank, a commercial bank and Anyadin, an entertainment magazine jointly introduced an award program, Humayun Ahmed Sahitya Puruskar, which would be conferred to two writers every year on Ahmed's birth anniversary – 12 November.

Several cinematographic adaptations of Ahmed's stories are made after his death. Anil Bagchir Ekdin (2015), directed by Morshedul Islam, won six Bangladesh National Film Awards. Krishnopokkho (2016) was directed by Meher Afroz Shaon. In October 2016, she announced the production of her next film based on Nokkhotrer Raat. Debi (2018) is produced by a grant from the Government of Bangladesh.

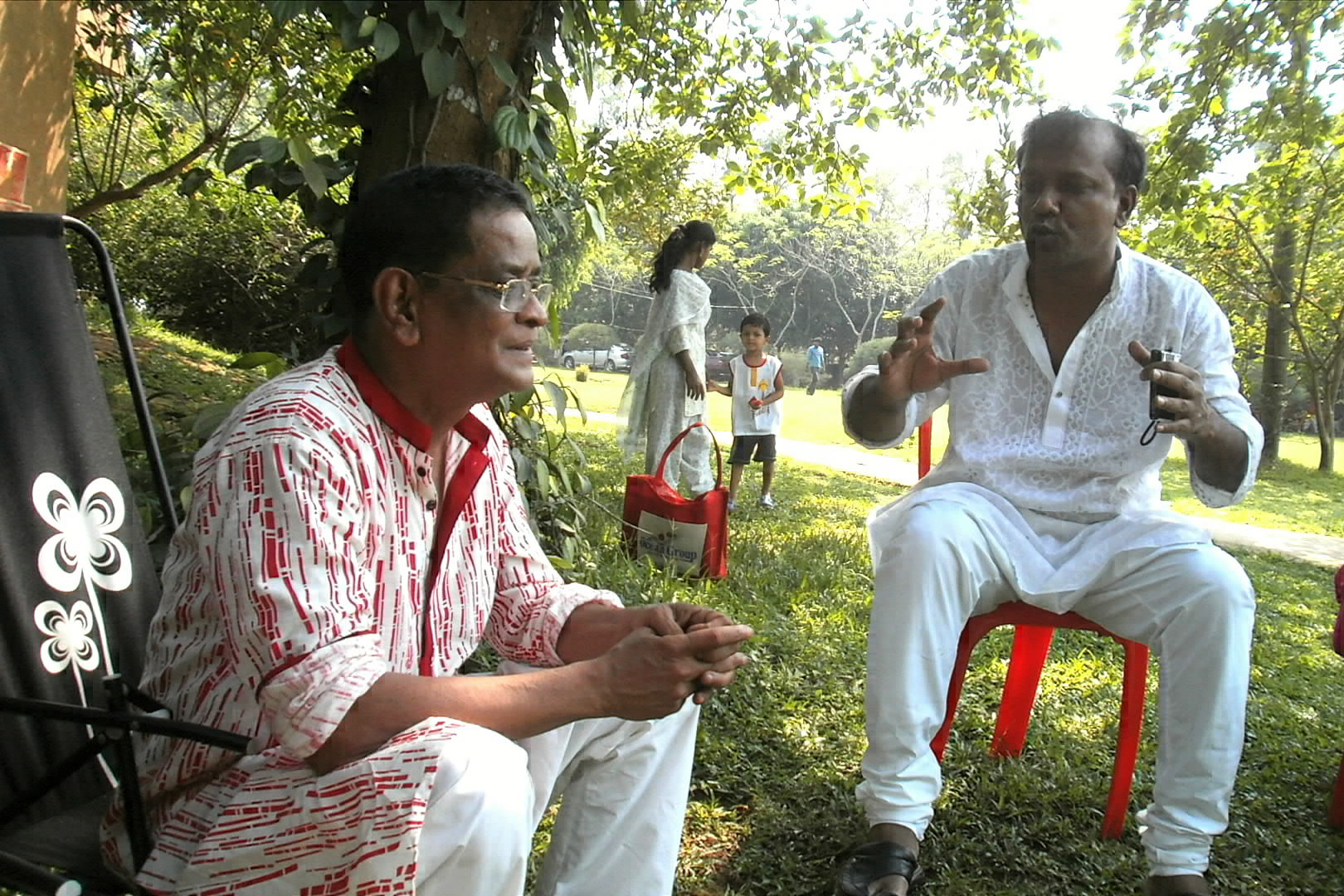
Ahmed at Nuhash Palli (2010)

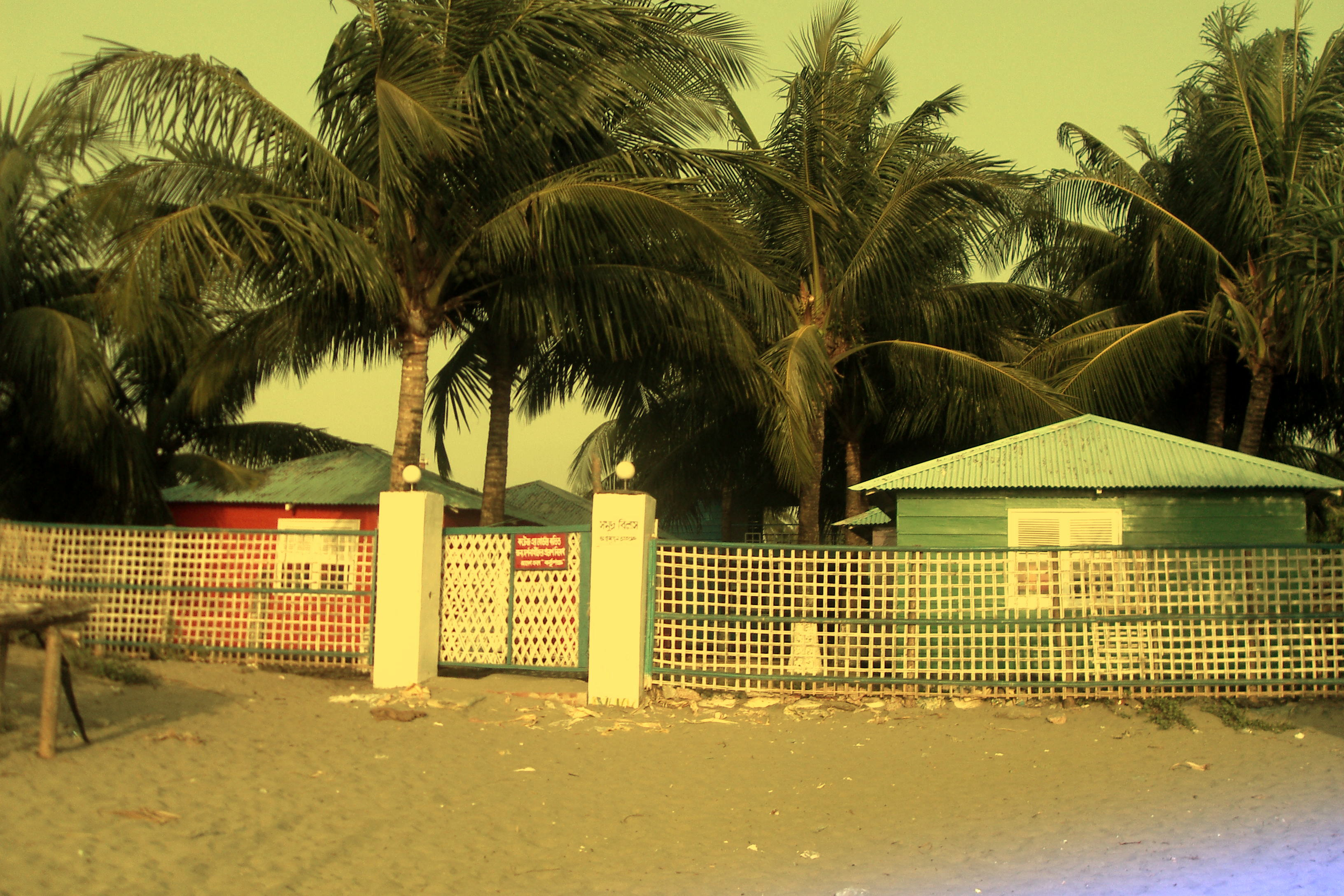
Shomudro Bilash

== Nuhash Palli ==
In 1987, Ahmed founded an estate, Nuhash Palli, named after his son Nuhash, near Pirujali village, 25 km from Gazipur City, in Gazipur District, which grew to cover 40 bigha (approximately 14 acres). He would spend much of his time at the estate when he was in Bangladesh. He formed a collection of statues there by local artist Asaduzzaman Khan and another of plants from around the world, particularly medicinal and fruit-bearing trees. he set up his own production company named Nuhash Chalachitra here.

== Shomudro Bilash ==
In 1988, he bought a property in the island of Saint Martin with ৳16000 ($132.03) and made a seaside residence named, 'Shomudro Bilash'. After his death in 2012, his wife Meher Afroz Shaon got the property handed over to her. She turned the residence into a resort. Now, the resort can be rented by tourists.

== Filmography ==
Year	Film	Director	Screenwriter	Notes
1992	Shonkhonil Karagar	No	Yes	Bangladesh National Film Award for Best Story
1994	Aguner Poroshmoni	Yes	Yes	Bangladesh National Film Award for Best Film; Bangladesh National Film Award for Best Story; Bangladesh National Film Award for Best Dialogue
1999	Srabon Megher Din	Yes	Yes	Bachsas Awards for Best Lyrics; Bachsas Awards for Best Story
2000	Dui Duari	Yes	Yes	
2003	Chandrokotha	Yes	Yes	
2004	Shyamol Chhaya	Yes	Yes	Bangladeshi submission for the Academy Award for Best Foreign Language Film
2006	Durotto	No	Yes	
2006	Nondito Noroke	No	Yes	
2006	Nirontor	No	Yes	
2006	Noy Number Bipod Sanket	Yes	Yes	
2007	Daruchini Dwip	No	Yes	Bangladesh National Film Award for Best Screenplay
2007	Saajghor	No	Yes	
2008	Amar Ache Jol	Yes	Yes	
2009	Priyotomeshu	No	Yes	
2012	Ghetuputra Komola	Yes	Yes	Bangladeshi submission for the Academy Award for Best Foreign Language Film; Bangladesh National Film Award for Best Director; Bangladesh National Film Award for Best Screenplay; Meril Prothom Alo Awards – Best Film; Meril Prothom Alo Awards – Best Director; Meril Prothom Alo Awards – Best Screenplay
2015	Anil Bagchir Ekdin	No	No	The first film based on Ahmed's literary work after his death
2016	Krishnopokkho	No	No	Based on his novel same name
2018	Debi	No	No	Based on his written novel same
2026	Bonolota Express	No	No	Based on his written novel "Kichukkhon"

== Bibliography ==
In Bengali

- 1971 – short story or novelette, later expanded into a novel with the ending changed
- Aaj Ami Kothao Jabo Naa
- Aaj Chitrar Biye
- Aaj Dupurey Tomar Nimontron
- Aaj Himur Biye
- Achinpur
- Adbhut Sob Golpo
- Ahok
- Aj Dupure Tomar Nimontran
- Akash Jora Megh
- Amar Ache Jol
- Amar Chelebela
- Aguner Poroshmoni
- Amar Priyo Bhoutik Golpo
- Ami Abong Koakti Projapoti
- Ami Ebong Amra
- Ami-ee Misir Ali
- Andhokarer Gaan
- Angul Kata Jaglu
- Anonto Nakhotro Bithi
- Anyodin
- Aporahnyo
- Ashabori
- Asmanira Tin Bon
- Ayna Ghor
- Ayomoy
- Badol Diner Prothom Kodom Phool
- Badol Diner Ditiyo Kadam Ful
- Badshah Namdar
- Baghbondi Misir Ali
- Ballpoint
- Basor
- Bhoy
- Bipod
- Bohubrihi
- Botol Bhoot
- Brihonnola
- Brishti Bilash
- Bristi O Meghomala
- Chader Aloi Koikjon Jubok
- Chhayabithi
- Cheleta
- Chokkhe Amar Trishna
- Chole Jay Bosonter Din
- Choto Golpo
- Daruchini Dwip
- Debi
- Dekha Na Dekha
- Dighir Jole Kaar Chhayago
- Dwitiyo Manob
- Doiroth
- Dorjar Opashe
- Dui Duari
- Deyal
- Ebong Hemu
- Ei Ami
- Ei Megh Roudro Chhaya
- Ei Shuvro Ei!
- Eki Kando!
- Ekjon Himu Koekti Jhin Jhin Poka
- Ekjon Mayaboti
- Ekattor Ebong Amar Baba
- Elebele
- Ema
- Epitaph
- Fera
- Fiiha Somikoron
- Fountain Pen
- Gouripur Jongshon
- Grihotagi Jyotsna
- Hartan Ishkapon
- Himu
- Himu Ebong Ekti Russian Pori
- Himu Ebong Howard PhD Boltu Bhai
- Himu Mama
- Himu Remand-E
- Himur Achhe Jol
- Himur Ditiyo Prohor
- Himur Ekanto Sakkhatkar
- Himur Hate Koekti Nilpodmo
- Himur Maddyha Dupur
- Himur Rupali Ratri
- Holud Himu, Kalo RAB
- Hotel Graver Inn
- Humayun Ahmed-er Premer Golpo
- Ireena
- Ishtishon
- Jalil Shaheber Petition
- Jibonkrishno Memorial High School
- Jochona O Jononir Golpo
- Jodiyo Sandhya
- Jol Jochona
- Jolpoddmo
- Jonom Jonom
- Kalo Jadukor
- Kathpencil
- Ke Kotha Koy
- Kichu Shoishob
- Kichukkhan
- Kobi
- Kohen Kobi Kalidas
- Kothao Keu Nei
- Krishnopokkho
- JibonKrishnopur Memorial High School
- Kuhak
- Kutu Mia
- Lilaboti
- Lilabotir Mrittu
- Lilua Batash
- Magic Munshi
- Manobi
- Matal Hawa
- Mayurakkhi (1990)
- Mayurakkhir Tire Prothom Himu
- Megh Boleche Jabo Jabo
- Megher Chhaya
- Mirar Gramer Bari
- Misir Ali Aapnii Kothay
- Misir Alir Amimangsito Rahasya
- Misir Alir Choshma
- Misir Ali Unsolved
- Moddhanhya (Novel)
- Mojar Bhoot
- Mrinmoyee
- Mrinmoyir Mon Bhalo Nei
- Nalini Babu BSc
- Nee
- Neel Hati
- Neel Manush
- Neel Oporajita
- Neel Poddo
- Nirbachito Bhooter Golpo
- Nirbason
- Nishad
- Nishithini
- Noboni
- Nokkhotrer Raat
- Nondito Noroke
- Omanush
- Omega Point
- Onish
- Onno Bhubon
- Opekkha
- Paap
- Pakhi Amar Ekla Pakhi
- Parapar
- Parul O Tinti Kukur
- Poka
- Priyotomeshu
- Pufi
- Putro Nishad
- Putul
- Quantum Roshayon
- Rakkhoss Khokkhoss Ebong Bhokkhoss
- Rodonbhora E Boshonto
- Rupa
- Rupar Palanko
- Sajghor
- Sanaullar Mohabipod
- Se Ashe Dhire
- Se O Nortoki
- Sedin Choitramas
- Sheet O Onyanno Golpo
- Shonkhonil Karagar
- Shunya
- Shuvro
- Shuvro Gechhe Bone
- Shyamol Chhaya
- Sobai Gechhe Bone
- Sokol Kata Dhonno Kore
- Sourov
- Tara Tin Jon
- Tetul Bone Jochna
- The Exorcist
- Tithir Neel Toale
- Tomader Jonyo Bhalobasa
- Tomake
- Tondra Bilash
- Tumi Amai Dekechhile Chhutir Nimontrane
- Uralpankhi
- Uthon Periye Dui Paa
- Nabiji (incomplete)

In English

- 1971: A Novel
- In Blissful Hell
- Flowers of Flame
- Gouripur Junction

=== Translations ===
- The Exorcist by William Peter Blatty

== Awards and honours ==
- Lekhak Shibir Prize (1973)
- Bangla Academy Literary Award (1981)
- Shishu Academy Award
- Zainul Abedin Gold Medal
- Michael Madhusudan Medal (1987)
- Bachsas Award for Best Story (1988)
- Humayun Qadir Memorial Prize (1990)
- Bangladesh National Film Award for Best Story (1994)
- Bangladesh National Film Award for Best Film (1994)
- Bangladesh National Film Award for Best Dialogue (1994)
- Ekushey Padak (1994)
- Sheltech Award (2007)
- Bangladesh National Film Award for Best Screenplay (2007)
- Bangladesh National Film Award for Best Director (2012)
- Bangladesh National Film Award for Best Screenplay (2012)
- Meril-Prothom Alo Award for best director (2013)
- Bangladesh National Film Award for Best Dialogue (2015)
