= Badshah Namdar =

2011 historical novel by Humayun Ahmed

- Author: Humayun Ahmed
- Language: Bengali
- Subject: Humayun and the Mughal Empire
- Genre: Historical fiction
- Publisher: Anyaprokash
- Publication date: 2011
- Publication place: Bangladesh
- Pages: ~230
- Text: Badshah Namdar at Wikisource

Badshah Namdar is a 2011 historical fiction novel by Bangladeshi writer Humayun Ahmed. The story presents a fictionalized account of the life of Mughal emperor Humayun, exploring his reign, exile, and eventual return to power.

== Synopsis ==
The novel depicts both political events and personal experiences, showing Humayun as a human being with fears, emotions, and ambitions. The title "Badshah Namdar" reflects the respect and notoriety of the emperor in the eyes of his contemporaries.

The book is noted for making historical events accessible to general readers through dramatic narration, character-driven storytelling, and humanized portrayals of historical figures.

== Motive of Author ==
Auto recalls his childhood when he was learning about the history his friends used to make fun of him for his similarity name humayun. Specially in class 6 or 7 he used to feel very depressed while learning that Mughal period.even his friend even called him "হারু হুমায়ূন" or loser humayun. But he didn't make it clear that it was his only reason to write the story.
