= Mostafizur Rahman (television personality) =

Bangladeshi television personality

- মুস্তাফিজুর রহমান

Director General of Bangladesh Television

Personal details
- Born: 19 August 1944
- Died: 26 July 2026 (aged 81) Dhaka, Bangladesh
- Spouse: Rawshan Ara Mustafiz
- Children: 2

Mostafizur Rahman (19 August 1944 – 26 July 2026) was a Bangladeshi television producer and director. He served as the director general of Bangladesh Television and the CEO of Banglavision.

== Career ==
Rahman directed television drama Ei Shob Din Ratri (1985). He also directed Dokhiner Janala, The Pearl, Shomoy Oshomoy, Ekti Setur Golpo.

Rahman was the director of the film Shonkhonil Karagar (1992).

In the 1980s, Rahman served as a programme manager of state-run Bangladesh Television (BTV). After serving as the director general of BTV, he played a key role in founding private television channels, Banglavision and Gazi TV (GTV).

== Personal life ==
Rahman was married to Rawshan Ara Mustafiz, an Ekushey Padak-winning Nazrul Geeti singer. Their elder son, Rana Mostafiz, lives in Toronto, Canada, and younger son, Abhi Mostafiz, in Sydney, Australia.
