= Attacks on Muhammad Zafar Iqbal =

Threats against the Bangladeshi writer

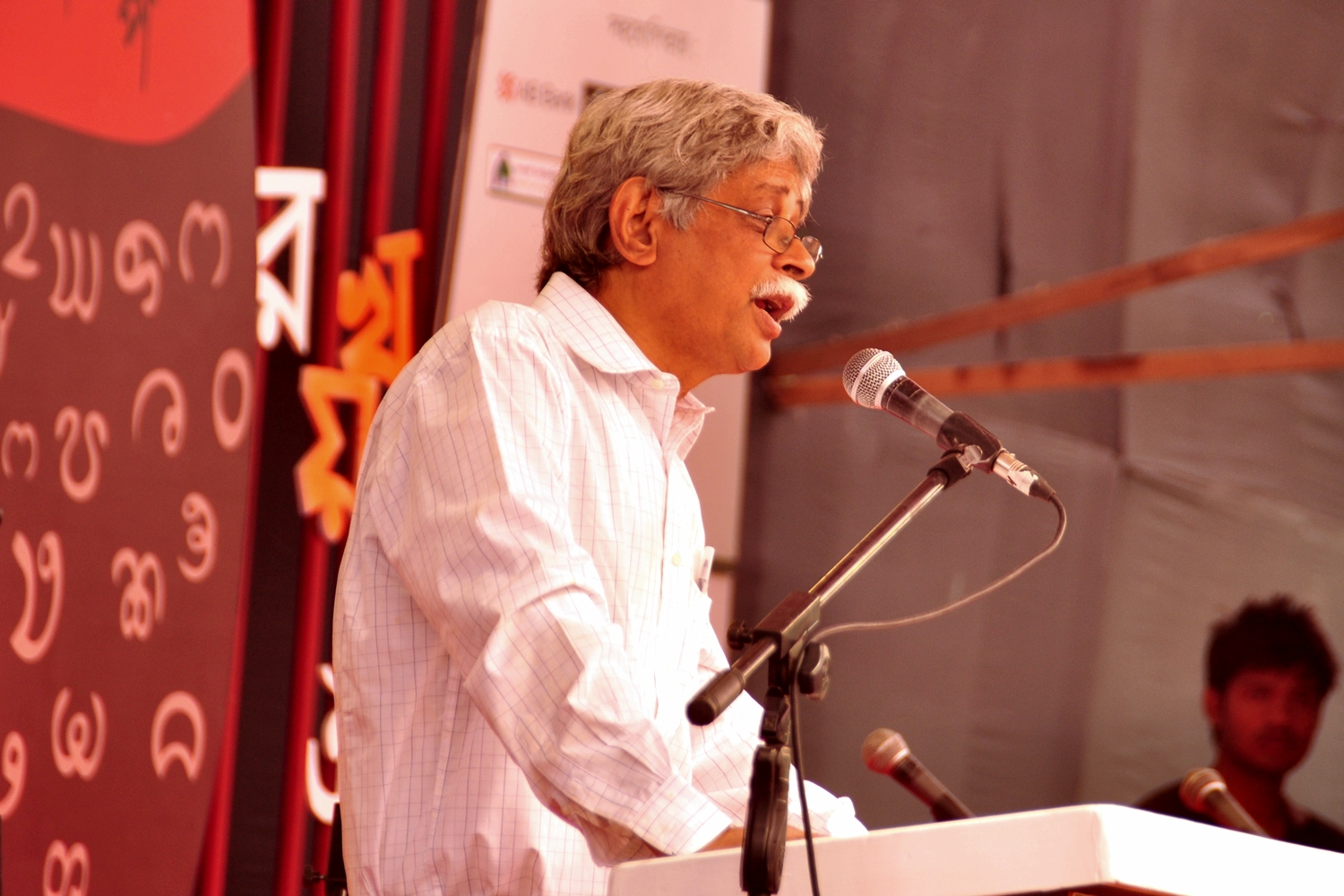
At a ceremony in Dhaka. Muhammad Zafar Iqbal

Muhammad Zafar Iqbal (born December 23, 1952) is a Bangladeshi writer, physicist, and educator. He is widely regarded as the pioneer of popularizing science fiction as a literary medium in Bangladesh. In addition to his science fiction writing, he is also a popular children's book author and columnist. His work has also been adapted into several films.

In addition to his writing and literary career, Iqbal is also currently a professor of computer science and engineering at Shahjalal University of Science and Technology and the head of the Electrical Strategy Department. During the closing ceremony of a robotic competition at Shahjalal University of Science and Technology, at 3 pm on March 27 (3 March 2018), a madrasa student named Faizur was attacked by the audience for attempting to kill him.

In 2024, Iqbal faced significant criticism from student groups during the nationwide quota reform protests for his reaction to protest slogans and perceived lack of support. This led to tensions, including his being declared 'persona non grata' by students at his university.

== Threats of murder and others ==
- In February 2013, a mass rally was organized in the Shahbag neighborhood of Dhaka, demanding the maximum punishment for Jamaat-e-Islami leader Quader Mollah, for crimes against humanity during the 1971 Bangladesh War of Liberation, Muhammad Zafar Iqbal was at the forefront of the movement. At the time, militant organizations and radical activists were threatening to overthrow Iqbal and exert control over the demonstrations. As was reported at the time, Iqbal was allegedly on a list of potential victims for targeted violence and attacks of the banned Islamist militant outfit Ansar Al Islam (also called Ansarullah Bangla Team or ABT).
- On May 27, 2013, several teachers, including Iqbal, were threatened with murder. The killing was threatened in the name of 'Al Qaeda Ansarullah Bangla Team: 13'. There was a threat in the excavation - 'mast you will prepare for the dead'. In a letter that was then called in the post, the target was a list of five people, including former Prime Ministerial advisor Hossain Toufique Imam, Professor Arefin Siddique, Professor Muhammad Zafar Iqbal, academic Kaberi Gaine, Physician and spokesperson for the 2013 Shahbag protests Imran H Sarker, and Tarana Halim. At that time, Professor Iqbal said, "The threat of murder is nothing new to me, so I am not afraid of it." I have received letters like this many times, many times, I have not told anyone, not even my wife.
- On October 24 (Wednesday), Iqbal and his wife Yasmin Haque were threatened with murder by text message by the militant group Ansarullah Bangla Team. It said: 'welcome to our new top list! Your breath may stop at anytime. ABT '. At 2:30 pm on the same date, another message also threatened. It siad: "Hi Unbeliever! We will strangle you soon". On October 1, the couple filed a report at Jalalabad police station in Sylhet city. Police said at the time that Iqbal and his wife Yasmin Haq were threatened with a message from the militant outfit Ansarullah Bangla Team. Armed police guards were then placed at their residence.
- On August 27, a letter was sent from an organization called Ittehadul Mujahideen threatening to attack Iqbal, along with seven online activists and writers. On October 24, Iqbal and his wife Yasmin Haque were threatened with murder by the militant group Ansarullah Bangla Team.
- Police recovered a hitlist from a JMB dugout in Bogra on 28 May, which included Iqbal's name.
- Police recovered a hitlist along with the names of four prominent men of Ansar al-Islam in the area, including Iqbal.
- On September 27, Zafar Iqbal Shahjalal protested against the Chhatra League's attack on teachers of science and technology universities. In a speech last August, Zafar Iqbal said, "The cause of the Chhatra League will be the Awami League." For this reason, a section of the Chhatra League has been reported to be angry over Iqbal's comments.
- June 28, Zafar Iqbal demanded exemplary punishment, and the Awami League and eight other parties held a humanitarian program in front of the National Press Club. The program says, "Atheism is being widely patronized in the label of progressive, intellectual and freeman in this country." Atheists are publicly blaspheming against the religion of Islam everywhere, including online. '
- Sylhet-3 constituency MP Mahmud Samad Chowdhury expressed his anger against Zafar Iqbal. At a meeting, he said, "If I was a big deal, I would have stabbed Zafar Iqbal in the courtroom."
- Zafar Iqbal and his wife were attacked in front of the Shahjalal Science and Technology University administrative building. Professor Yasmin Haque was also reported to have fallen to the ground in an attack on students when he joined the protest, which began on April 12. An angry Jafar Iqbal said at the time, "If the students who attacked the teachers here were my students, I should have hung them with a rope around the neck"

== March 3, 2018 assassination attempt ==
On Saturday, March 3, 2018, at 5:40 PM, Zafar Iqbal was stabbed at Shahjalal University of Science and Technology in Sylhet. At the time, the closing ceremony of the Robotics Competition of the Electrical and Electronic Engineering (EEE) Festival was underway at the university's open stage. According to eyewitnesses, at one point during the event, a commotion broke out. During this, someone attacked the professor's head.

Immediately after the attack, Zafar Iqbal was taken to Sylhet M.A.G. Osmani Medical College Hospital. There, he was taken into the operating theater, where his wounds were cleaned and stitched. He had four blows to the head, believed to be from a metal rod. In addition, he had stab wounds on his left hand and back. Zafar Iqbal received 26 stitches to the head, six to his left hand, and another six to the left side of his back — totaling 38 stitches.

=== Identity of the attacker ===
Right after the attack, students and police officers present at the scene apprehended the attacker. The young man was beaten by the crowd and taken to the university's administrative building. There, university authorities and police officials interrogated him.

According to investigative reports from various newspapers, the assailant who attacked author Zafar Iqbal is named Faizur Rahman, also known as Faizul (24). He is a resident of Sheikhpara, adjacent to the bus stand in Kumargaon, near the university campus. He is the son of Hafiz Atikur Rahman, the owner of a house named "Kacha Monjil" in Sheikhpara. His ancestral home is in the village of Kaliarkapon, under Jagdal Union in Dirai Upazila of Sunamganj. He used to work at a shop named "Moin Computer" in Sylhet.

According to locals and the Counter Terrorism and Transnational Crime (CTTC) unit, Faizur passed the Dakhil exam from Dhol Madrasa in Dirai. He then sat for the Alim exam from a madrasa in Sylhet. After passing Dakhil from the madrasa, he did not continue his education. However, no one knows from which madrasa he took the Alim exam. Faizul's father, Maulana Atikur Rahman, is known to be a teacher at Shah Khurrum Mokhlisia Hafizia Women's Madrasa in the Tukerbazar area, adjacent to the Sylhet-Sunamganj road.

The CTTC further reported that Faizul had been living with his family in the area near the university for about 20 years. His father bought land in Sheikhpara and built a semi-pucca house there. Immediately after the attack on Saturday, Faizul's family locked up their home in Sheikhpara and fled elsewhere by CNG-run auto-rickshaw.

During the operation, the attacker's uncle Fazlur Rahman was arrested, and books and CDs were seized from the home of the attacker's father, Maulana Atikur Rahman. The arrested Fazlur Rahman Fazlu is the Joint Convener of the Sunamganj District Farmers' League. He is involved in the land-selling business.

On Sunday night at around 10:30 PM, Faizul Hasan's father Hafiz Atikur Rahman and mother Minara Begum were arrested by police from the Madina Market area in Sylhet city.

After multiple interrogations, the attacker identified Zafar Iqbal as an enemy of Islam and revealed this as the motive for the attempted murder. The commanding officer of RAB-9 confirmed this information. Later, Faizul told RAB that the attack on Zafar Iqbal was carried out because of his novel "Bhuter Baccha Solaiman" (Solaiman, the Ghost's Child).

The Sylhet Bureau reported that the attacker, Faizul Hasan, confessed to attempting to kill Zafar Iqbal because he had been inspired by extremist ideology. In RAB's initial interrogation, Faizul admitted that he attacked Zafar Iqbal because the novel "Bhuter Baccha Solaiman" mocked the Prophet Solomon. Faizul claimed, "Zafar Iqbal is an enemy of Islam, that's why I attacked him to kill him. He is an atheist himself and spreads atheism to others. His writings mislead people." This confession was reported on Sunday by the commanding officer of RAB-9. RAB stated that Faizur Hasan is a believer in extremist ideology. He was influenced to carry out the attack by listening to religious sermons (waz), watching videos online, and reading books. A RAB official mentioned that Faizul had gone to the university campus twice on the day of the attack. Faizul stated that at the time of the attack, there was no one else around him.

=== Immediate moment of the attempted murder ===
- According to Naushad Sajib, a judge of the competition and an eyewitness to the attempted attack, right after being stabbed, the writer stood up and said to the students present, "I am alright, don't get agitated." He further said that at the time, blood was streaming down the teacher's head, soaking his face and shirt. Immediately after saying that, he placed one hand on the wound and tried to find a chair with the other hand to sit down. Right after that, teachers and students caught hold of him and transferred him to the hospital.
- While being taken to the operation theatre at Sylhet MAG Osmani Medical College Hospital, he said to the general students, "Where is the boy? Don't beat him."
- A doctor on duty during the operation wrote in a Facebook post that after regaining consciousness, Sir asked him for sleeping pills. Another doctor in the operating theatre wrote, "Professor Zafar Iqbal is one of the bravest men I've seen. Even while being administered anesthesia on the operating table, he said — 'I'm okay. Just need some blood.'"
- Zafar Iqbal called his wife Yasmeen Haque via mobile phone to inform her that he had been attacked. However, he assured her that he was okay and was being taken to the hospital. He did not want his family to learn of the incident from television. The writer also urged his wife over the phone to calm the protesting students. Later, upon meeting her husband, he again requested her not to let the students on campus become agitated and to console them instead.

=== Family's reaction ===
Zafar Iqbal's nephew and playwright, Nuhash Humayun, said in response, "No matter what pain or conflict or even death may come — his family will continue trying to change society." Yasmeen Haque, told the media, "Zafar Iqbal will return to campus. He has five courses to teach." She directly rejected the allegation that the police were negligent in their duties.

Zafar Iqbal's daughter, Yesham, said in response, "These kinds of people are like fungi. They haven't been properly cleaned out... They're not going anywhere from this country that was born out of something like the Liberation War."

=== Reaction after recovery ===
After being discharged from the hospital, Zafar Iqbal expressed sorrow for those who engage in murderous intent, missing out on feeling the beauty of the world and doing good as young people.

== Meeting with Faizur ==
Since the attack, Zafar Iqbal had been eager to meet the assailant Faizur, but the meeting took place several days later. When he finally met Faizur, who was being held in Sylhet Jail, the author noted that the assailant's face bore a cheerful expression. The author asked Faizur why he had committed the act, to which he replied that he did it because Iqbal was anti-Islam.

When asked why he thought so, Faizur said it was because of the book Bhuter Baccha Solaiman ("The Ghost Child Solaiman"). In response to the professor's question, Faizur admitted he had not read the book before attacking the teacher. Although the police later made him read it, even then, he could not find anything in it that was anti-Islam.

After speaking with Zafar Iqbal, Faizur stated before leaving that he had made a mistake. In his book Obishshashyo Shundor Prithibi ("An Incredibly Beautiful World"), Zafar Iqbal expresses his dismay, saying, "No guilt or remorse—Faizur simply believes he made a mistake."

Zafar Iqbal has cast doubt on whether Faizur truly believes that, and, dismissing the matter, he notes at the end of his book, "Just to see this wonderful world means so much to him."
