= Ahsan Habib (cartoonist) =

Bangladeshi cartoonist and writer

- আহসান হাবীব
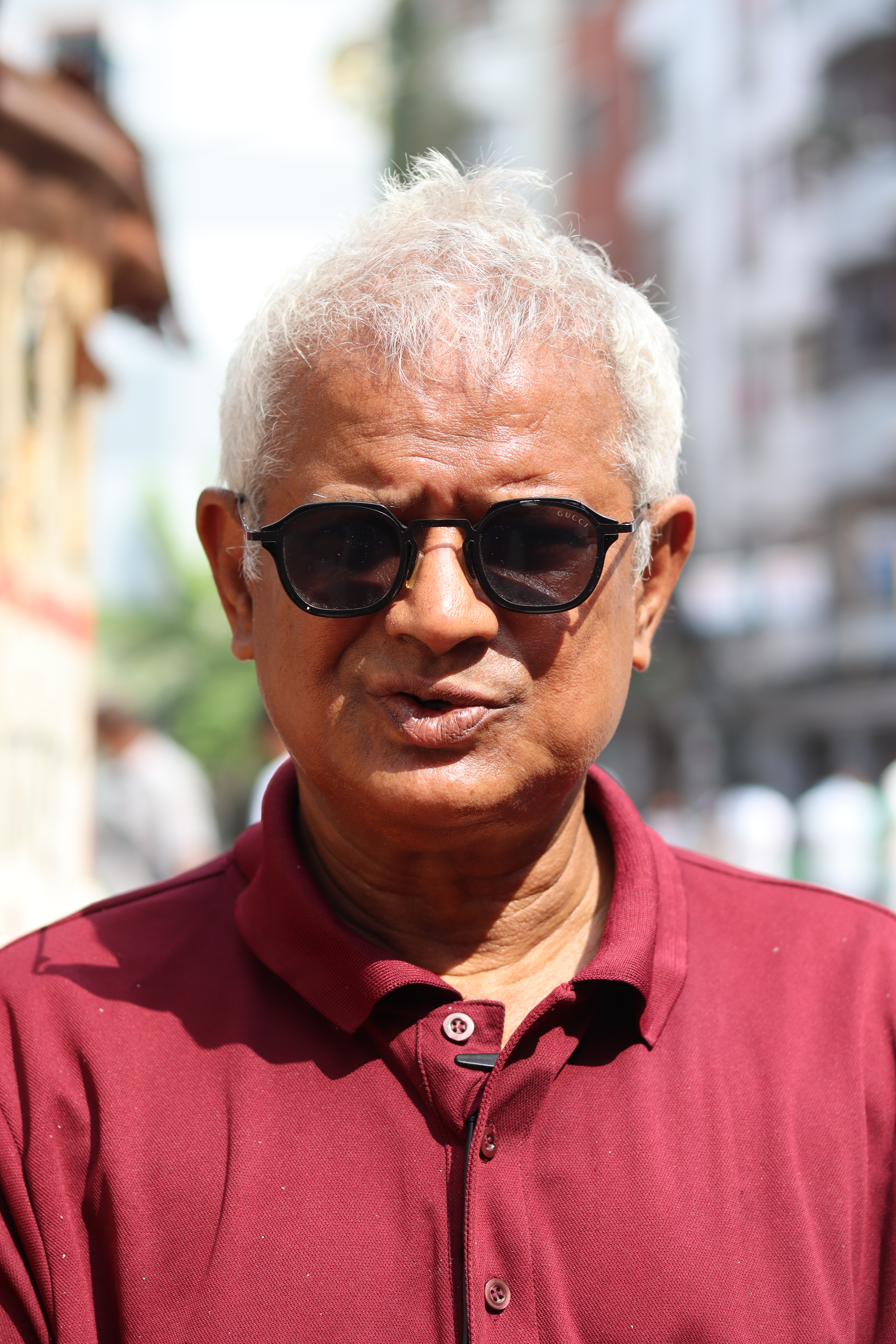
- Ahsan Habib in 2023
- Born: 15 November 1957 (age 68); Sylhet, Bangladesh
- Education: University of Dhaka (MSc)
- Occupations: Cartoonist, editor
- Spouse: Afroza Amin
- Children: 1
- Parents: Faizur Rahman Ahmed; Ayesha Faiz
- Relatives: Humayun Ahmed (brother); Muhammad Zafar Iqbal (brother); Sufia Haider (sister); Momtaz Shahid (sister); Rukhsana Ahmed (sister)

Ahsan Habib ([aɦsan ɦabib]) is a Bangladeshi cartoonist, writer and editor of Unmad, a satire magazine.

== Early life ==
Habib was the third son of Faizur Rahman Ahmed and Ayesha Foyez. His father, a police officer, was killed by the Pakistani army during the liberation war of Bangladesh in 1971. His elder brother, Humayun Ahmed, was a writer and film-maker. Another brother, Muhammed Zafar Iqbal, is also a writer and educationist. Habib is married to Afroza Amin and they are parents to only child Shabnam Ahsan.

Due to his father's occupation, Habib spent his childhood in different parts of Bangladesh - Jagdal, Panchagarh, Rangamati, Bandarban, Chittagong, Bogra, Comilla and Pirojpur.

== Education ==
Habib studied in more than eight schools before the SSC exam. He earned MSc degree in geography from the University of Dhaka.

== Career ==
Habib started career as a cartoonist and writer. He is the editor of Unmad, a satire magazine running since the early 1980s. He was the editor of the Bengali science fiction magazines, Moulik, Autoline, and Ghuddi. He is an adviser of Bangladesh Cartoonist Association.

As a cartoonist, Habib designed many covers. He also worked on writing Sher, a short witty 3/4 lined satiric poem, mainly found in the Indian Subcontinent.

In 2015 he joined as a professor of Daffodil International University in department of Multimedia and Creative Technology (MCT). His area of teaching is Graphic Novel.

“This is a time of saturated information; but this information is not knowledge. The job of the cartoonist is to convert information into knowledge. The knowledge, then, has to be transformed into wisdom. Wisdom is what can be useful for society.”

— Ahsan Habib, editor, Unmad

== Books ==
- Ira namer horin

=== Jokes ===
- Rat Barotar Porer Jokes
- Four Twenty Four Hour Jokes
- Jokes Somogro
- 999 Ta Jokes Ekta Fao
- 1001 Ta Jokes 1ta Missing
- Valentine Jokes
- Jini Jokes
- Big and Small Jokes

=== Non-fiction ===
- Abjab
- Likhte Likhte Lekhok
- Baba Jokhon Akkebare Coto
- Eshkul Time
- Office Time
- Jaha Bolibo Mittha Boilobo
- Voot Jokhon Ghost

=== Science fiction ===
- Paowel Broonskir Bichar
