= Deyal =

2013 political novel by Humayun Ahmed

Deyal দেয়াল
- Author: Humayun Ahmed
- Cover artist: Masum Rahman
- Language: Bengali
- Subject: History after Bangladesh's war of independence, the assassination of Sheikh Mujibur Rahman's family, Coup and rule of Ziaur Rahman
- Genre: Novel
- Published: February 2013
- Publisher: Anyaprakash
- Publication place: Bangladesh
- Media type: Imprint
- Pages: 198 (1st edition)
- ISBN: 9789845021272

Deyal (Bengali: দেয়াল, Translation: Wall) is a 2015 political/historical novel by Bangladeshi writer Humayun Ahmed, based on the socio-political crisis in the aftermath of the war of independence of Bangladesh. It was the last novel of the writer and was published one year after his death. The publication of the book was delayed by a High Court verdict.

== Background ==
In the midst of 2011, Ahmed started writing the book and after writing the first five chapters, these parts were published in Anyadin magazine. After a long period, while he was in treatment of cancer in United States, he again started writing the novel, but he died before completing the last part of the work. The novel was written according to several well-known historical literatures following the events after the Liberation war, including Bangladesh: A Legacy of Blood by Anthony Mascarenhas.

== Characters ==
- Obonti
- Shafiq
- Sarfaraz Khan
- Isabella
- Shamim Sikder
- Radhanath
- Sheikh Mujibur Rahman
- Khaled Mosharraf
- Syed Nazrul Islam
- Tajuddin Ahmad
- AHM Qamaruzzaman
- M Monsur Ali
- Major Syed Faruque Rahman
- Major Rashid
- Khondaker Mostaq Ahmad
- Lieutenant General Ziaur Rahman
- Major General Khaled Mosharraf
- Major General Monjur
- Indian spy Kao
- Major Rashid
- Major Dalim
- Qader Bangladeshi-tea seller
- Colonel Taher
- Captain Ishtiaq
- Captain Faruq
- Chanu Bhai
- Dora Rasna
- Major Naser
- Awami Leaguer Mojammel
- Pir Hamid Kutubi
- Hafez Jahangir
- Captain Shams
- Andha Pir

== Controversy ==
Before being published, there was controversy over the accuracy of a section of the book, that related to the killing of Sheikh Russel in the 15 August 1975 Bangladesh coup d'état, and a case was brought in the Bangladesh High Court by Attorney General Mahbubey Alam. According to the high court's order, the first part of the book had to be changed and the Government was ordered to provide Humayun Ahmed with a copy of the verdict on the killing so that he might correct factual inaccuracies.

== Reception ==
Deyal was a best seller in the 2013 Ekushey Book Fair. In 2013, Justices AHM Shamsuddin Choudhury and Sheikh Md Zakir Hossain of the Bangladesh High Court issued a verdict challenging the execution of Colonel Abu Taher in which they made references to Deyal.

== See also ==
- Jochona O Jononir Golpo
- Assassination of Sheikh Mujibur Rahman
