= Dwitiyo Manob =

Bengali science fiction written by Humayun Ahmed

- Dwitiyo Manob book cover
- Author: Humayun Ahmed
- Original title: Bengali: দ্বিতীয় মানব
- Language: Bengali
- Genre: Novel
- Publisher: Annyaprokash
- Publication date: May, 2002
- Publication place: Bangladesh
- Pages: 64
- ISBN: 9848681965

Dwitiyo Manob or Ditiyo Manob (English: The second generation) is a Bengali science fiction written by Bangladeshi writer Humayun Ahmed. This novel deals with the super natural powers of Homo superior (the next generation of Homo sapiens) and it is inspired by 1911 science fiction novel The Hampdenshire Wonder.

== Synopsis ==
Mehtabuddin is a successful businessman living in Dhaka with his daughter. He has problem of anger management, and has promised his daughter Tuntuni that he will keep his cool for a week. A school teacher from Netrokona, Mehtabuddin's native place, sends a man named Khalilullah to meet Mehtabuddin; Khalilullah supposedly has "special power". Khalilullah appears very simple and rustic. However he astonishes them by staying under water without oxygen for several hours, and fixing electronic equipment with no tools and no training. Mehtabuddin, clueless on how to solve Khalilullah's mysterious power, seeks help from his knowledgeable and bookworm friend Jalal. Despite their strict examination of Khalilullah's exhibition of special power, the mystery remains unresolved.

Meanwhile, Tuntuni, an otherwise loner, strikes friendship with Khalilullah. Khalilullah reminisces that he grew his special power following a heavy bout of high fever in his childhood; he does not remember anything before. The school teacher from Netrokona further informs Mehtabuddin that Khalilullah may be a jinn. Mehtabuddin becomes increasingly restless and uncomfortable by Khalilullah's unresolved mystery. Jalal suggests that he could be "Homo superior", the next evolutionary stage of Homo sapiens. Mehtabuddin locks Khalilullah in a room.

Moved by Tuntuni's telling of her mother's untimely death, Khalilullah endeavours to create a machine that would help reconnect with the dead. Tuntuni questions why Mehtabuddin locked Khalilullah. Growing emotional connection between Khalilullah and Tuntuni further unsettles Mehtabuddin; he arranges for killing Khalilullah while Tuntuni suffers from heavy fever.

== Characters ==
- Mehtabuddin
- Tuntuni
- Khalilluah/Aranya
- Jalal Khan
- Barek
- Habibur Rehman (retired Headmaster of a village school)

== See also ==
- Misir Ali
- Himu
