= Debi (novel) =

Debi দেবী
- Author: Humayun Ahmed
- Language: Bengali
- Genre: Novel
- Published: June 1985
- Publisher: Abosor Prokashoni
- Publication place: Bangladesh
- Media type: Imprint
- Pages: 94

Debi (Bengali: দেবী) is a mystery novel by Bangladeshi author Humayun Ahmed, first published in June 1985. The novel marks the debut of the character Misir Ali, a rational thinker who solves various mysteries through logic and reasoning. In this story, Misir Ali attempts to uncover the mystery surrounding Ranu, a young woman suffering from auditory hallucinations and exhibiting extrasensory perception.

== Background ==
Humayun Ahmed first thought of the character Misir Ali while he was living in Fargo, North Dakota, during a car ride with his wife, Gulketin Ahmed. He started writing Debi some time later, and the book was published in June 1985 by Abosor Prokashoni.

== Plot ==
At midnight, Ranu senses an unusual presence and wakes her husband, Anis. He calmly tries to reassure her with logical explanations, as he has seen her behave strangely before. Ranu often predicts events or knows things she should not know, which makes Anis sometimes suspect she is unwell, though he tries to rationalize everything. Their neighbor Neelu also notices Ranu’s mysterious nature and becomes interested in her, partly because Neelu is a psychology student. Ranu discusses her experiences with Professor Misir Ali, and Anis also shares everything with him. Curious about Ranu’s abnormal traits and apparent extrasensory powers, Misir Ali visits her village. Ranu recalls a childhood incident when, while bathing in a river, she felt someone pull her leg and discovered it was a corpse holding her. Since then, her strange abilities began. Villagers also mention that a man once lured her to a Vishnu temple but fled in fear, after which a white idol in the temple disappeared. Meanwhile, Neelu meets a man at a restaurant; though polite at first, he later forces her into his car and drives to a secluded place. At that time, Ranu falls ill, babbling feverishly as if speaking to someone unseen, and eventually dies. Soon after, Neelu reports that some invisible force killed her abductor. Misir Ali dismisses this as the imagination of an agitated mind, yet he notices a change in Neelu—her appearance and mannerisms start to resemble Ranu’s, suggesting that the mysterious spirit connected to Ranu may now live on in Neelu.

== Characters ==
- Misir Ali – A part-time lecturer of clinical psychiatry in the Department of Psychology at the University of Dhaka.
- Ranu Ahmed – A young woman with strange visions and extrasensory perception.
- Neelu – Ranu’s neighbor and a student of psychology.
- Anis Ahmed – Ranu’s husband, a duty officer at The Zenith International.
- Ahmed Sabet
- Bilu – Neelu’s younger sister.
- Onufa – Ranu’s cousin.
- Komlendu – A colleague of Anis.
- Jitu Mia – The domestic help at Ranu’s house.

== In popular culture ==
=== Theatre Adaptation ===
Since 1994, the theatre group Bahubachan has been staging the play Debi, which was adapted for the stage by Muhammad Zafar Iqbal based on the novel Debi.

Controversy over ESP: Ekti Rohosyo Golpo

In 2016, the story of Humayun Ahmed’s novel was closely copied, except for the characters’ names and religions, without crediting him, in the film ESP: Ekti Rohosyo Golpo. The film credited the story to Shibashish Roy instead. When the movie aired on Zee Bangla Cinema in August 2016, Bangladeshi media outlets widely criticized the film for plagiarism. Humayun Ahmed’s widow, Meher Afroz Shaon, publicly protested the unauthorized use of the story and demanded compensation. The film’s director, Shekhar Das, stated that he had not been aware of the issue and promised to investigate the matter and offer an apology if the allegations were confirmed.

=== Debi (2018 film) ===
In 2018, the mystery film Debi: Misir Ali Prothombar was made, drawing its story from Humayun Ahmed’s novel Debi. The film was directed by Anam Biswas and produced by Jaya Ahsan under her production company C Te Cinema, with government grants. Chanchal Chowdhury played the role of Misir Ali and Jaya Ahsan portrayed Ranu. Other key cast members included Labonno Chowdhury (as young Ranu), Shabnam Faria, Animesh Aich, and Iresh Zaker. The film was originally announced for release on 7 September 2018 but was later postponed and premiered in Bangladesh on 19 October 2018. It was also released in several cities in Australia on 10 November 2018.
