= Shonkhonil Karagar (novel) =

1973 novel by Humayun Ahmed

Flowers of Flame
- Author: Humayun Ahmed
- Original title: শঙ্খনীল কারাগার
- Language: Bengali
- Genre: Novel
- Publication date: 1973
- Publication place: Bangladesh
- Media type: Print
- Pages: 85
- Preceded by: In Blissful Hell

Flowers of Flame (Bengali: শঙ্খনীল কারাগার, romanized: Shonkhonil Karagar, lit. 'Conch Blue Prison') is a 1973 novel by Bangladeshi author Humayun Ahmed. It was his second book after his debut novel Nondito Noroke.

== Characters ==
- Rabeya
- Khoka
- Runu
- Jhunu
- Montu
- Ninu
- Farid
- Motin Uddin's Boss
- Abed Hossen
- Doctor
- House-help
- Shirin (Mrs. Motin Uddin)
- Motin Uddin
- Kitki
- Choto Khalu
- Choto Khala

== Adaptation ==
The book was made into the 1992 film with the same title, starring Zafar Iqbal, Champa, Dolly Johur, Abul Hayat, Suborna Mustafa and Asaduzzaman Noor.
