= Jagdal Union =

Jagdal Union may also refer to:

- Jagdal Union, Derai, a union in Derai Upazila under Sunamganj District
- Jagdal Union, Magura Sadar, a union in Magura Sadar Upazila
