= Muhammed Zafar Iqbal =

Bangladeshi scientist and writer

- মুহম্মদ জাফর ইকবাল
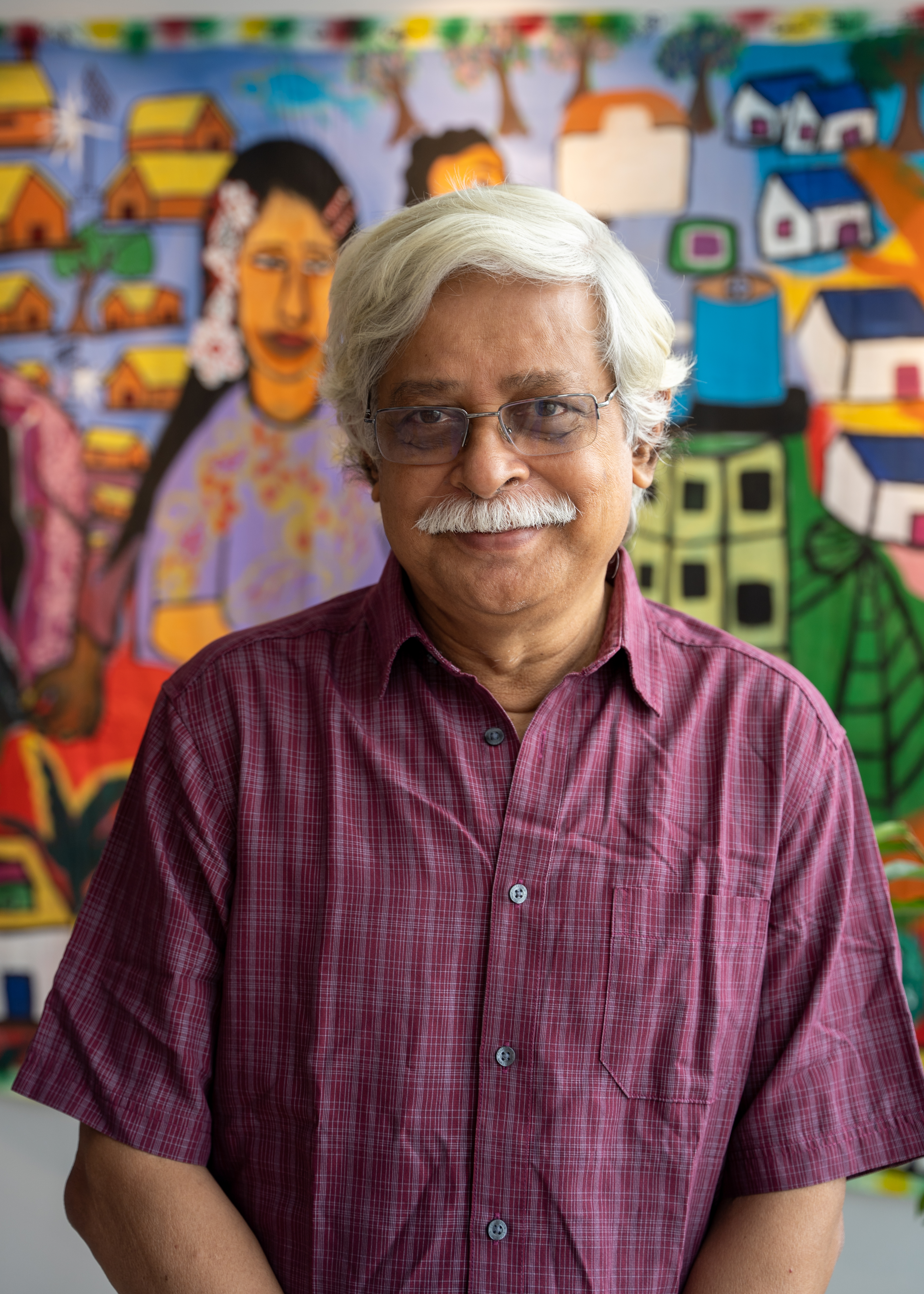
- Iqbal in 2022
- Pronunciation: [muɦɔmːɔd̪ zaɸoɾ ikbal]
- Born: 23 December 1952 (age 73); Sylhet, East Bengal, Pakistan (now Bangladesh)
- Citizenship: Bangladeshi
- Education: PhD in physics
- Alma mater: Dhaka College (HSC); University of Dhaka (BSc, MSc); University of Washington (PhD)
- Occupations: Physicist; writer; columnist
- Spouse: Yasmeen Haque (m. 1978)
- Children: Nabil Iqbal; Yeshim Iqbal
- Parents: Faizur Rahman Ahmed (father); Ayesha Akhter Khatun (mother)
- Relatives: Humayun Ahmed (brother); Ahsan Habib (brother)
- Awards: Bangla Academy Literary Award (2004), Dhaka University Alumni Association Medal (2005), Meril-Prothom Alo Award for Best Playwright (2005), Best Storyteller, National Film Award (2011), National ICT Award (2017)

Muhammed Zafar Iqbal (Note: Bengali: [muɦɔmːɔd̪ zaɸoɾ ikbal].) (Bengali: মুহম্মদ জাফর ইকবাল, pronounced [muɦɔmːɔd̪ zaɸoɾ ikbal]; born 23 December 1952) is a Bangladeshi author, physicist, activist, former professor of computer science and engineering, and former head of the department of Electrical and Electronic Engineering (EEE) at Shahjalal University of Science and Technology (SUST). He achieved his PhD from University of Washington. After working 18 years as a scientist at California Institute of Technology and Bell Communications Research, he returned to Bangladesh and joined Shahjalal University of Science and Technology as a professor of Computer Science and Engineering. He retired from his teaching profession in October 2018.

== Early life and education ==
Muhammed Zafar Iqbal was born on 23 December 1952 in Sylhet of the then East Pakistan. His father, Faizur Rahman Ahmed, was a police officer who was killed in the Liberation War of Bangladesh. His mother was Ayesha Akhter Khatun AKA Ayesha Faiz. He spent his childhood in different parts of Bangladesh because of the transferring nature of his father's job. His elder brother, Humayun Ahmed, was a prominent writer and filmmaker. His younger brother, Ahsan Habib, is a cartoonist who is serving as the editor of the satirical magazine, Unmad. He has three sisters - Sufia Haider, Momtaz Shahid and Rukhsana Ahmed.

Iqbal passed the SSC exam from Bogura Zilla School in 1968 and the HSC exam from Dhaka College in 1970. He earned his bachelor's and master's in physics from the University of Dhaka in 1973 and 1974 respectively and then went to the University of Washington where he earned his Ph.D. in 1982.

== Career ==
=== Academic ===
After obtaining his PhD degree, Iqbal worked as a post-doctoral researcher at California Institute of Technology (Caltech) from 1983 to 1988 (mainly on Norman Bridge Laboratory of Physics). He then joined Bell Communications Research (Bellcore), a separate corporation from the Bell Labs (now Telcordia Technologies), as a research scientist. He left the institute in 1994.

According to Iqbal, he had always planned to return to Bangladesh. When, around 1992, he began seeking a teaching position at the University of Dhaka, he found the process labyrinthine. He eventually abandoned the idea of working there, and accepted an offer from SUST, where he joined the computer science and engineering department and became its head.

Iqbal served as the vice president of Bangladesh Mathematical Olympiad committee until 2024. He played a leading role in founding the Bangladesh Mathematical Olympiad and popularized mathematics among Bangladeshi youths at local and international level. In 2011, he won the Rotary SEED Award for his contribution in the field of education.

On 26 November 2013, Iqbal and his wife professor Haque applied for resignation soon after the university authority had postponed the combined admission test for the SUST and Jashore University of Science Technology. However they withdrew their resignation letters on the next day after the authority decided to go on with holding combined admission tests.

To make the NCTB text book "easy" and "learner friendly", in November 2017, there was a new revision of the secondary education class 9-10 text books for 2018, whose six books were revised under Iqbal and Mohammad Kaykobad's leadership. He is also the first co-author and chief editor of multiple new NCTB text books of 2023 including class 7's text book "Science (Investigative Study)" where some lines and pictures were plagiarised from different websites including National Geographic Education Resource Library website and in case of Bangla Version of the text book, because of erroneous translation it was alleged that those texts were translated into Bangla "using Google Translate". Later he admitted the issue of plagiarism and admitted his fault as the chief editor.

=== Literary ===
Iqbal started writing stories at a very early age. He wrote his first science fiction short story at the age of seven. While studying at the University of Dhaka, Iqbal's story "Kopotronik Bhalobasha" ("Copotronic Love") was published in the weekly Bichitra. Later he wrote a series of Kopotronik stories and published them as a collection titled Copotronic Sukh Dukkhu.

He wrote numerous books for teenagers, such as novels, science fiction, and adventure books. Several of his books are:

- Meku Kahini
- Shanta Poribar
- Kabil Kohlafi
- Dushtu Chheler Dol
- Nitu o Tar Bondhura
- Dipu Number 2
- Obonil
- Ikarus
- Pri
- Tritron Ekti Groher Nam
- Amar Bondhu Rashed
- Haat Kata Robin

== Political stance ==
Iqbal is known for his stance against Bangladesh Jamaat-e-Islami, the Islamist party which allied with Pakistan and committed various war crimes during the Bangladesh Liberation War and has spearheaded criticism of its leaders, several of whom were undergoing trial at the International Crimes Tribunal for their role in the Bangladesh liberation war in 1971. Iqbal's father was allegedly killed by Jamaat leader Delwar Hossain Sayeedi. He came down heavily on a section of the media for their stand against holding the 10th parliamentary elections in Bangladesh on 5 January 2014, amid a boycott by the main opposition party, alleging that those who were calling for halting the electoral process were actually trying to ensure the participation of Jamaat-e-Islami in the election.

In support of the war crime trials carried out at the premises of the International Crimes Tribunal in Bangladesh, he participated and featured prominently at the 2013 Shahbag protests.

Iqbal survived a stabbing attack in the head on 3 March 2018 in a prize-giving ceremony in SUST campus in Sylhet. Foyzur, the attacker, a 25-year-old male, was arrested after he had been beaten by the students. The attacker claimed that he had tried to kill him because the attacker believed he was an "enemy of Islam".

Iqbal has been widely criticized for supporting the authoritarian regime of Sheikh Hasina. After the 2018 national election he stated that, people gave a grand victory to ruling authoritarian regime but later it was proved to be a staged election.

In May 2025, an attempted murder case was filed against Iqbal over a student of alia madrasa getting injured in Old Dhaka during protests against Hasina in August 2024.

== Works ==
Iqbal is one of the pioneers of science fiction in the Bengali language. He mainly writes for younger readers. He has also written several non-fiction books on physics and mathematics. He writes columns in mainstream newspapers regularly. Zafar Iqbal also writes storylines for the famous Bengali "Dhaka Comics."

He writes a detective book series titled, Tuntuni o Chotachchu. Chotachchu is a short form of 'Choto Chachchu' which lexically translates to 'Small Uncle'; it means, 'the youngest uncle'.

- Tuntuni o Chotachchu (2014)
- Aro Tuntuni o Aro Chotachchu (2015)
- Abaro Tuntuni o Abaro Chotachchu
- Tobuo Tuntuni Tobuo Chotachchu (2018)
- Jokhon Tuntuni Tokhon Chotachchu
- Jerokom Tuntuni Sherokom Chotachchu (2020)
- Jetuku Tuntuni Shetuku Chhotachchu
- Aha Tuntuni Uhu Chhotachchu (2022)
- Bah Tuntuni Bah Bah Chhotachchu (2023)
- Ogo Tuntuni Kigo Chhotachchu (2024)

== Personal life ==
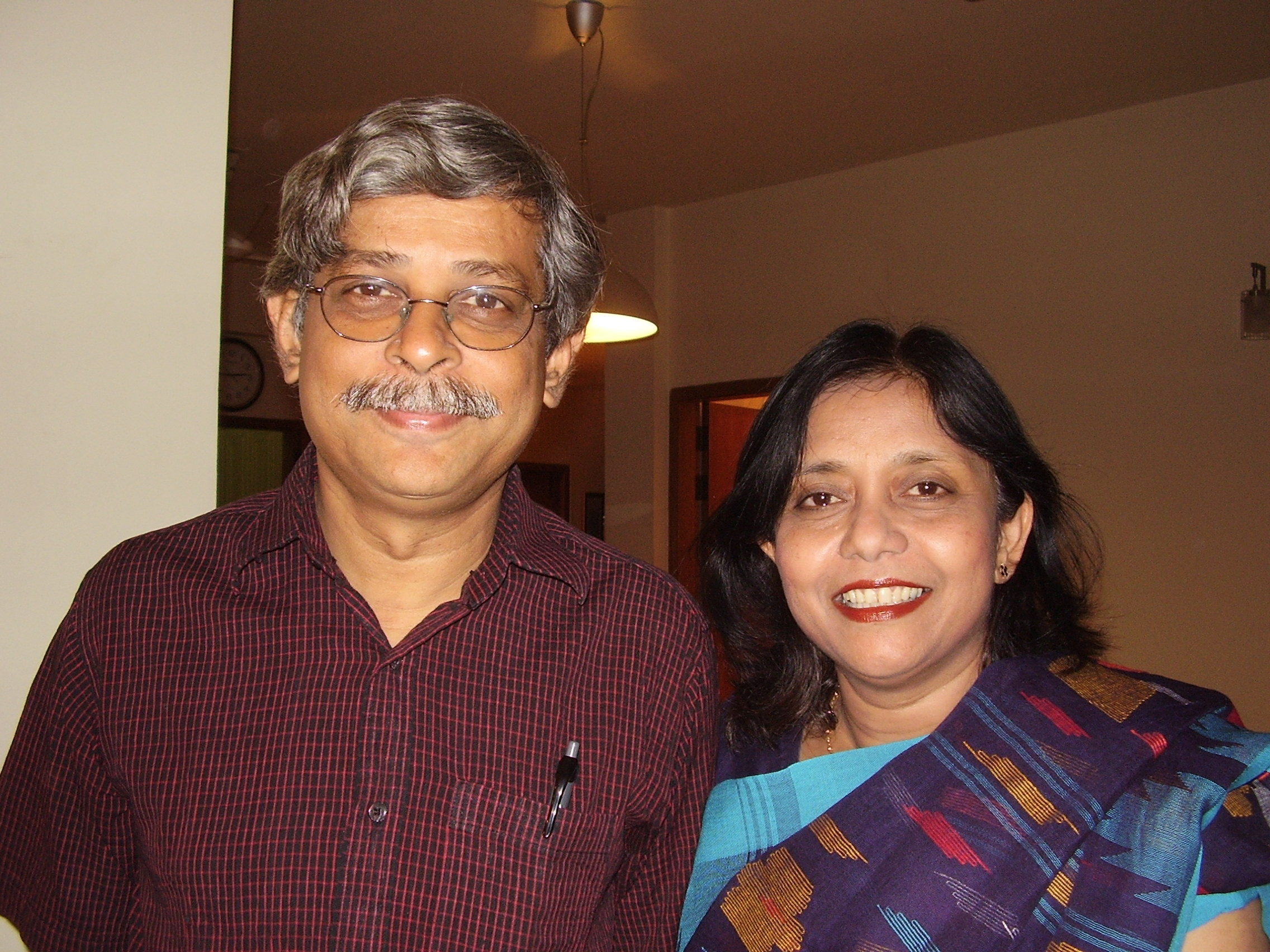
Iqbal with his wife, Yasmeen Haque

Iqbal married Yasmeen Haque in 1978. She was the Dean of the Life Science Department and Professor of the Department of Physics at SUST. They have a son, Nabil Iqbal, working as a scientist at Durham University and a daughter, Yeshim Iqbal, a research scientist at Global TIES for Children at New York University after completing her Ph.D. from the same institution.

== Awards ==
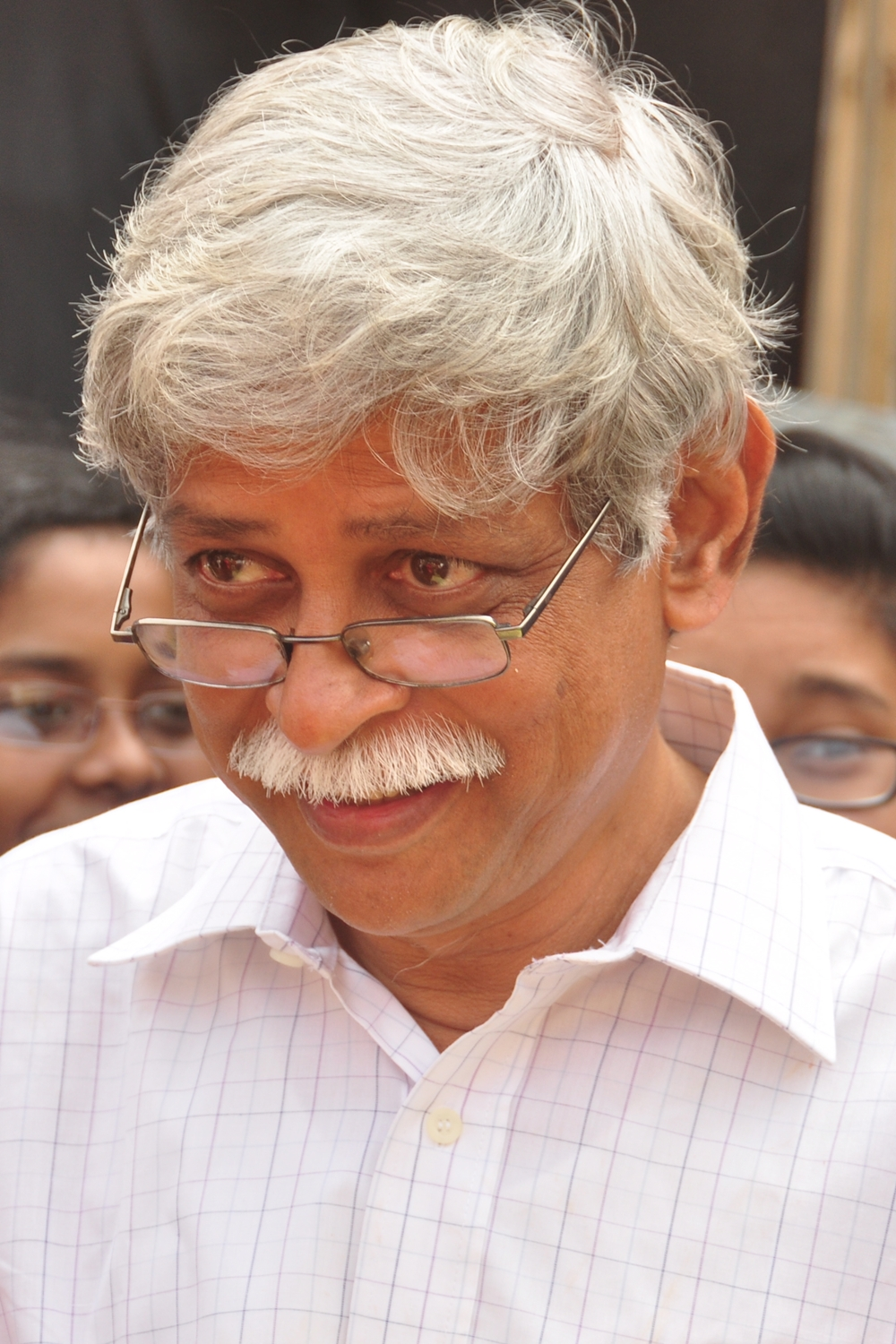
Iqbal at Borno Mela, Dhaka (February 2013)

- Agrani Bank Shishu Shahitto Award (2001)
- Quazi Mahbubulla Zebunnesa Award (2002)
- Khalekdad Chowdhury Literary Award (2003)
- Sheltech Literary Award (2003)
- Uro Child Literary Award (2004)
- Md. Mudabber-Husne ara literary Award (2005)
- Marcantile Bank Ltd. Award (2005)
- One of the 10 living Eminent Bengali (2005)
- American Alumni Association Award (2005)
- Dhaka University Alumni Association Award (2005)
- Sylhet Naittamoncho Award (2005)
- Bangla Academy Literary Award (2005)
- Best Playwright Meril Prothom Alo Awards (2005)
- Uro Child Literary Award (2006)
- Rotary SEED Award (2011)
- National ICT Award (2017)

== Controversies and criticism ==
He received criticism for endorsing anti-Islamic activities referenced in Shah Ahmad Shafi's open letter named An Open Letter from Shah Ahmad Shafi to the Government and the Public related to the Shahbag protests in 2013. In 2023, under the government's new education policy, changes were made to books of various classes. Zafar Iqbal was a co-author and the chief editor of several new textbooks, including the 7th-grade textbook. However, after the publication of the "Science (Investigative Reading)" textbook, accusations of plagiarism and mechanical translation arose. Later, Zafar Iqbal acknowledged his mistake regarding the book and, in a joint statement with Hasina Khan, stated, "This year the experimental version of the book has been launched, and there is ample opportunity for revision and editing in the next academic year."

On July 16, 2024, during the quota reform movement, he expressed his dismay at the slogan 'Razakar' by writing, "Dhaka University is my university, my beloved university. However, I feel that I will never want to go to this university again. When I see the students, I will think, these might be the 'Razakars'. And for the rest of my life, I do not want to see the face of any Razakar. There is only one life, so why should I have to see Razakars again in that life?" This comment led to criticism on social media, and on the same day, several bookstores in Bangladesh, including Rokomari, stopped selling his books. Additionally, students at SUST declared him unwanted at the institution.

In August 2026, Zafar Iqbal was named in a draft investigation report concerning alleged crimes against humanity committed during the July Uprising. The case concerns alleged attacks on students at the University of Dhaka. On 7 August, the prosecution of the International Crimes Tribunal said that a formal charge sheet was being prepared against Iqbal and former University of Dhaka vice-chancellor A. S. M. Maksud Kamal, subject to approval by the Chief Prosecutor.

== See also ==
- Attacks on Muhammad Zafar Iqbal
