= Keramat Moula =

Bangladeshi theater activist and art director

- Born: 15 November 1942 (age 83); Jessore District, Bengal Presidency, British India
- Education: Dhaka Art College
- Occupation: Actor

Keramat Moula (born 15 November 1942) is a Bangladeshi theater activist and art director. He was awarded Ekushey Padak in 2014 by the Government of Bangladesh.

== Background ==
Moula was born on 15 November 1942, in Jessore District to Abdul Kader and Kaniz Fatema. He is the sixth of his parents' seven children. He married Nazma Begum. He was the first art director of Bangladesh Television in 1965. His first acting on BTV was in the play, Ondhokartai Alo, by Natyaguru Nurul Momen.

== Career ==
Moula was a student of Zainul Abedin and Mustafa Monwar when he was a student at the department of Drawing and Painting of Dhaka Art College (later Faculty of Fine Arts, University of Dhaka).

He is a part-time lecturer at the Television, Film and Media Department of Stamford University Bangladesh.

== Awards ==
- East Pakistan Education Award in drama (1961)
- "Best Actor" at the 2nd International Theatre Festival
- "Best Art Direction" at the 1st National Television Award (1975)
- "Best Actor" at the Shilpakala Academy Award (1978)
- Utpal Datta Shammanona (2006)
- Ekushey Padak (2014)
