= Faizur Rahman =

Bangladeshi freedom fighter

Faizur Rahman Ahmed ফয়েজুর রহমান আহমেদ
- Born: 21 February 1921; Kutubpur, Netrokona, East Bengal, British India
- Died: 5 May 1971 (aged 50); Pirojpur, East Pakistan, Pakistan
- Spouse: Ayesha Foyez (m. 1944–1971)
- Children: 6, including: Humayun Ahmed; Muhammad Zafar Iqbal; Ahsan Habib
- Parents: Azimuddin Ahmed (father); Fatema Ahmed (mother)
- Relatives: Nuhash Humayun (grandson)
- Awards: Independence Day Award (2017)

Faizur Rahman Ahmed (Bengali: ফয়েজুর রহমান আহমেদ; February 21, 1921 – May 5, 1971) was a police officer during the Bangladesh Liberation War. He was killed by Pakistani military personnel during the war. He was given the Independence Day Award posthumously by the government of Bangladesh in 2017.

He is well known for being the father of veteran Bangladeshi writer Humayun Ahmed.

== Early life ==
Ahmed was born on February 21, 1921, in Kutubpur village of Netrokona district of Bangladesh, which was then a part of British Empire. His father was a farmer and his mother was a housewife.

== Education and career ==
There was no school in Rahman's village and he had to move to somewhere else for his primary study. He completed his Bachelor of Arts degree in 1943. After completing his BA, he joined a primary school as a teacher. He joined the police in 1948. He was posted to Sylhet as a sub-inspector of police and later posted to Dinajpur, Panchagarh, Rangamati, Bandarban, Chittagong, Bogra, Comilla and Pirojpur.

He was promoted to Inspector while he was in Bogra. He was promoted as a Deputy Superintendent of Police and posted to Comilla. He joined as the sub-divisional police officer in Pirojpur which was then a sub-division of East Pakistan and participated in the Liberation War of Bangladesh in 1971. He was also a writer.

== Personal life ==
Faizur Rahman was married to Ayesha Faiz on February 8, 1944. His first son Humayun Ahmed nicknamed Kajal was born in 1948 in his in-law's house of Mohongonj, Netrokona when he started his career as a police in Sylhet. His first daughter Sufia Haider Shefali, and another son Muhammad Zafar Iqbal, second daughter Momtaz Shahid Shikhu and last son Ahsan Habib were born in Sylhet. His last daughter Rukhsana Ahmed was born in Bandarban.

== Role in Liberation War ==
Faizur Rahman Ahmed joined as a sub-divisional police officer in Pirojpur. He experienced the disdain of the rulers of West Pakistan after the 1970 Bhola cyclone that affected his area too. Later, when the Pakistan Army cracked down on Bangladeshis in Dhaka on March 25 he decided to join the Bangladesh Liberation War. On March 27, when he heard the declaration of independence by Ziaur Rahman on behalf of Sheikh Mujibur Rahman, he distributed around 200 rifles from the armory of police to the common people as a preparation for the Bangladesh Liberation War.

== Death ==
Pakistan Army on their arrival at Pirojpur learnt about the stance of Faizur Rahman on Bangladesh Liberation War. They called him in the name of a meeting with the help of some police officials who were supporting the Pakistan Army and shot him dead at the bank of the river Baleshwar on May 5, 1971.
