= Shonkhonil Karagar (film) =

Bangladeshi film

- Bengali: শঙ্খনীল কারাগার
- Directed by: Mostafizur Rahman
- Written by: Humayun Ahmed
- Screenplay by: Humayun Ahmed
- Based on: Shonkhonil Karagar by Humayun Ahmed
- Starring: Dolly Johur; Asaduzzaman Noor; Suborna Mustafa; Azizul Hakim; Champa; Momtazuddin Ahmed; Nazma Anwar; Abul Hayat; Mahmuda Khatun; Zafar Iqbal; Syed Hasan Imam; Minu Rahman; Nazmul Huda Bachchu; Rawshan Zamil; Masud Ali Khan; Kazi Mehfuzul Haque
- Cinematography: M.A. Mobin
- Edited by: Kazi Abdur Rahim
- Music by: Khondokar Nurul Alam
- Production company: The Government of Bangladesh
- Distributed by: Bangladesh Television (BTV)
- Release date: 22 May 1992 (Bangladesh)
- Running time: 124 Min
- Country: Bangladesh
- Language: Bengali

Shonkhonil Karagar (Bengali: শঙ্খনীল কারাগার) is a 1992 Bangladeshi Bengali-language film directed by Mostafizur Rahman. This film is based on the novel of writer Humayun Ahmed.

== Cast ==
- Dolly Johur as Rabeya
- Asaduzzaman Noor as Khoka
- Suborna Mustafa as Runu
- Azizul Hakim as Montu
- Champa as Kitki
- Momtazuddin Ahmed as Motin Uddin
- Nazma Anwar as Shirin (Mrs. Motin Uddin)
- Abul Hayat as Abed Hossen
- Zafar Iqbal as Farid
- Mahmuda Khatun as house-help
- Syed Hasan Imam as Choto Khalu
- Minu Rahman as Choto Khala
- Nazmul Huda Bachchu
- Rawshan Zamil
- Masud Ali Khan as Motin Uddin's boss
- Kazi Mehfuzul Haque as Doctor
- Chhonda
- Shahidul Amin
- Md. Raushan Ali
- Anwar Hossain
- Badruzzaman
- Md. Kamruzzaman
- Abul Hossain
- Kazi Nadira Daisy
- Afsar Uddin Ahmed
- Arshad Ali

== Soundtrack ==
The music of this film was directed by Khondokar Nurul Alam and lyrics were penned by Mohammad Rafiquzzaman. The singers are Andrew Kishore, Runa Laila and others.

== Awards ==
Award Title	Category	Awardee	Result
National Film Awards	Best Film	Shonkhonil Karagar	Won
National Film Awards	Best Actress	Dolly Johur	Won
National Film Awards	Best Story	Humayun Ahmed	Won
National Film Awards	Best Sound Editing	M.A. Majid	Won

== See also ==
- Saajghor
