= Unmad =

Monthly satire magazine in Bangladesh

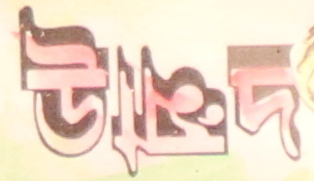

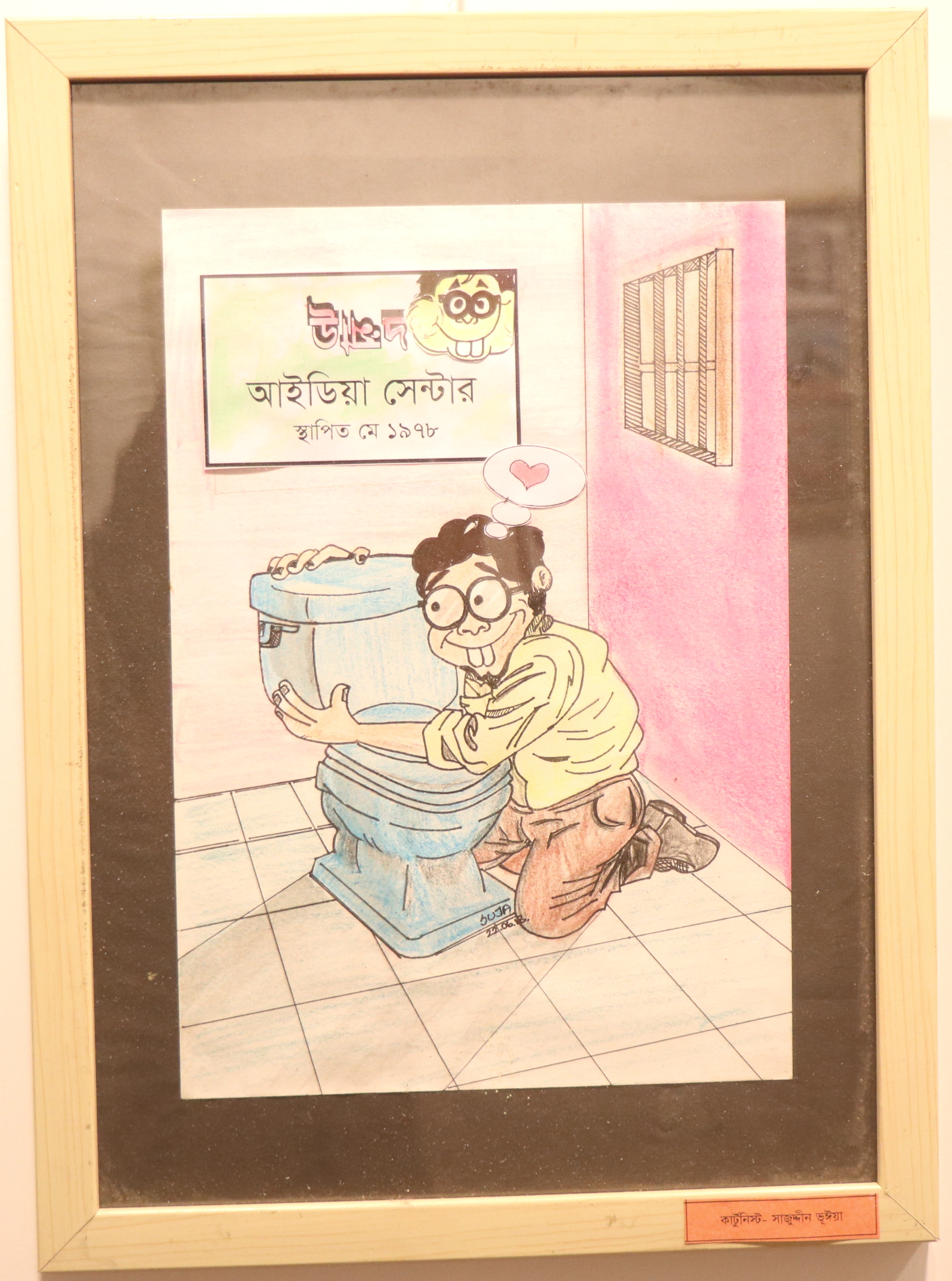
- Editor: Ahsan Habib
- Categories: Satirical magazine
- Frequency: Monthly
- Circulation: 10,000–12,000
- Founder: Ishtiaq Hossain, Kazi Khaleed Ashraf
- First issue: May 1978; 47 years ago
- Company: Unmad
- Country: Bangladesh
- Language: Bengali
- Website: www.unmadmagazine.com
- OCLC: 948759641

Unmad, the Sanskrit word for mad or insane, has been used as the name of a monthly satire magazine in Bangladesh. The magazine was founded by Ishtiaq Hossain and Kazi Khaleed Ashraf in 1978 and tries to ape MAD Magazine. Bangladeshi cartoonist Ahsan Habib is its present chief editor.

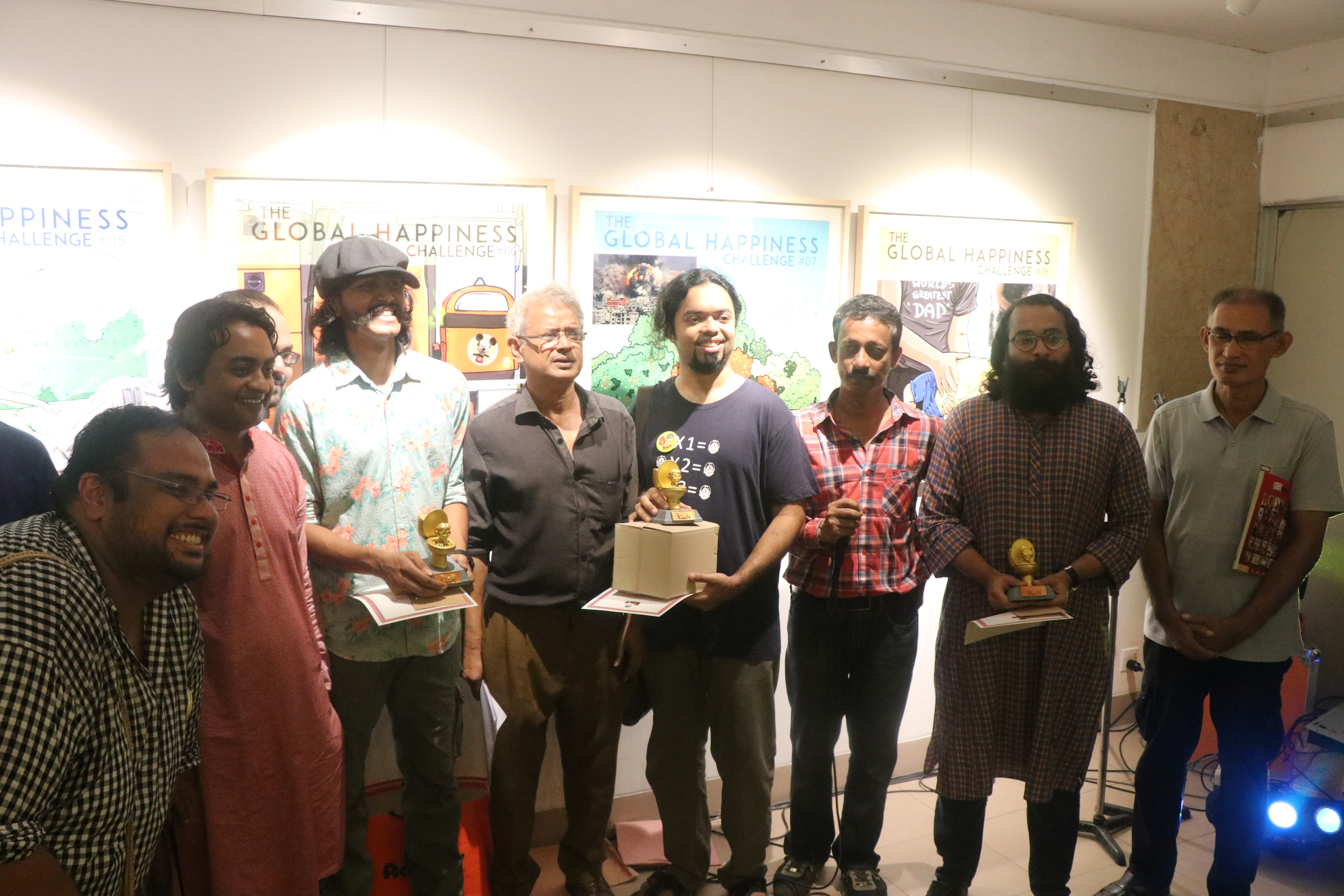
Winner cartoonist with Unmad team at 40th year celebration program in Dhaka, 2018

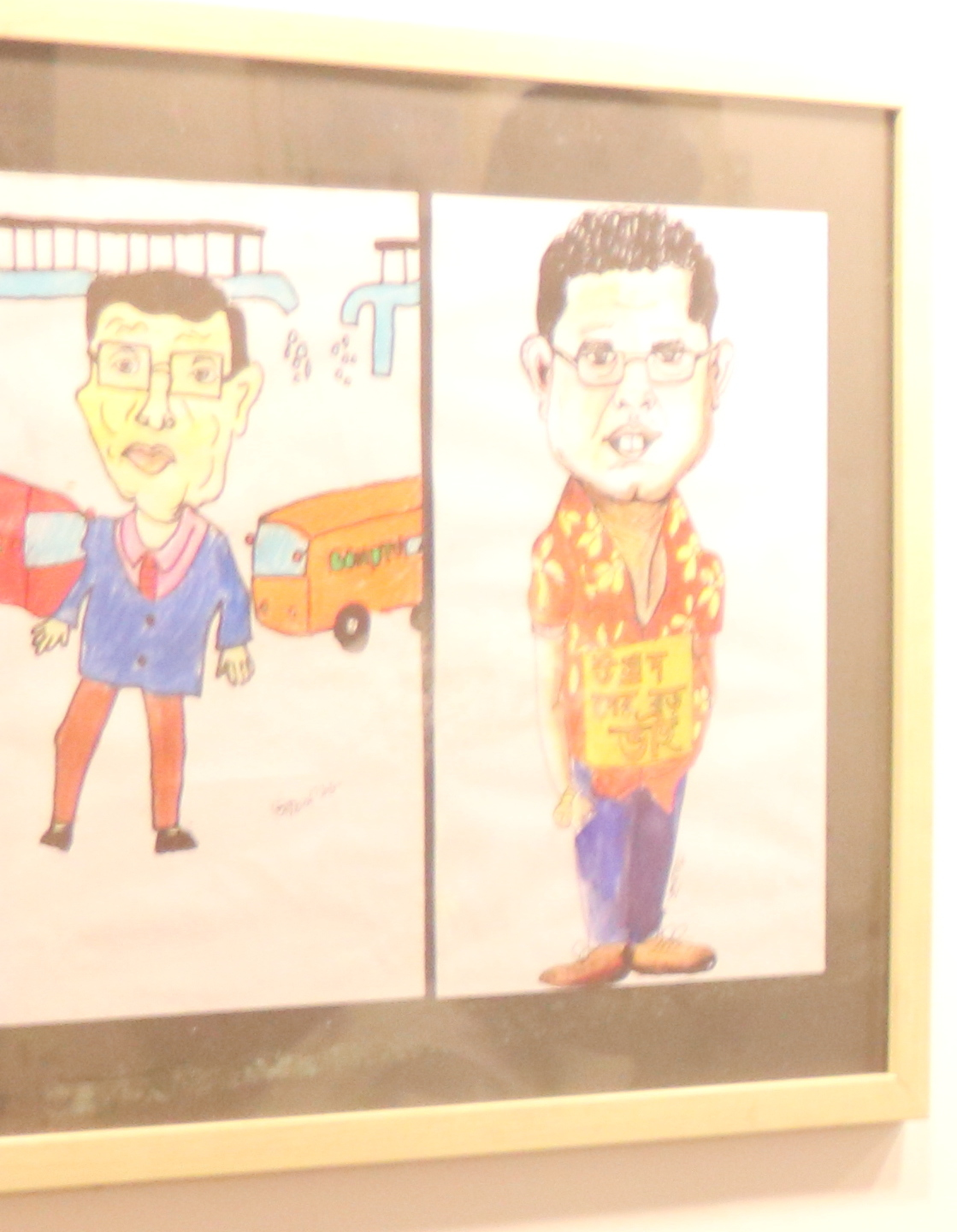
A photo from the Unmaad 40 Year Celebration exhibition.

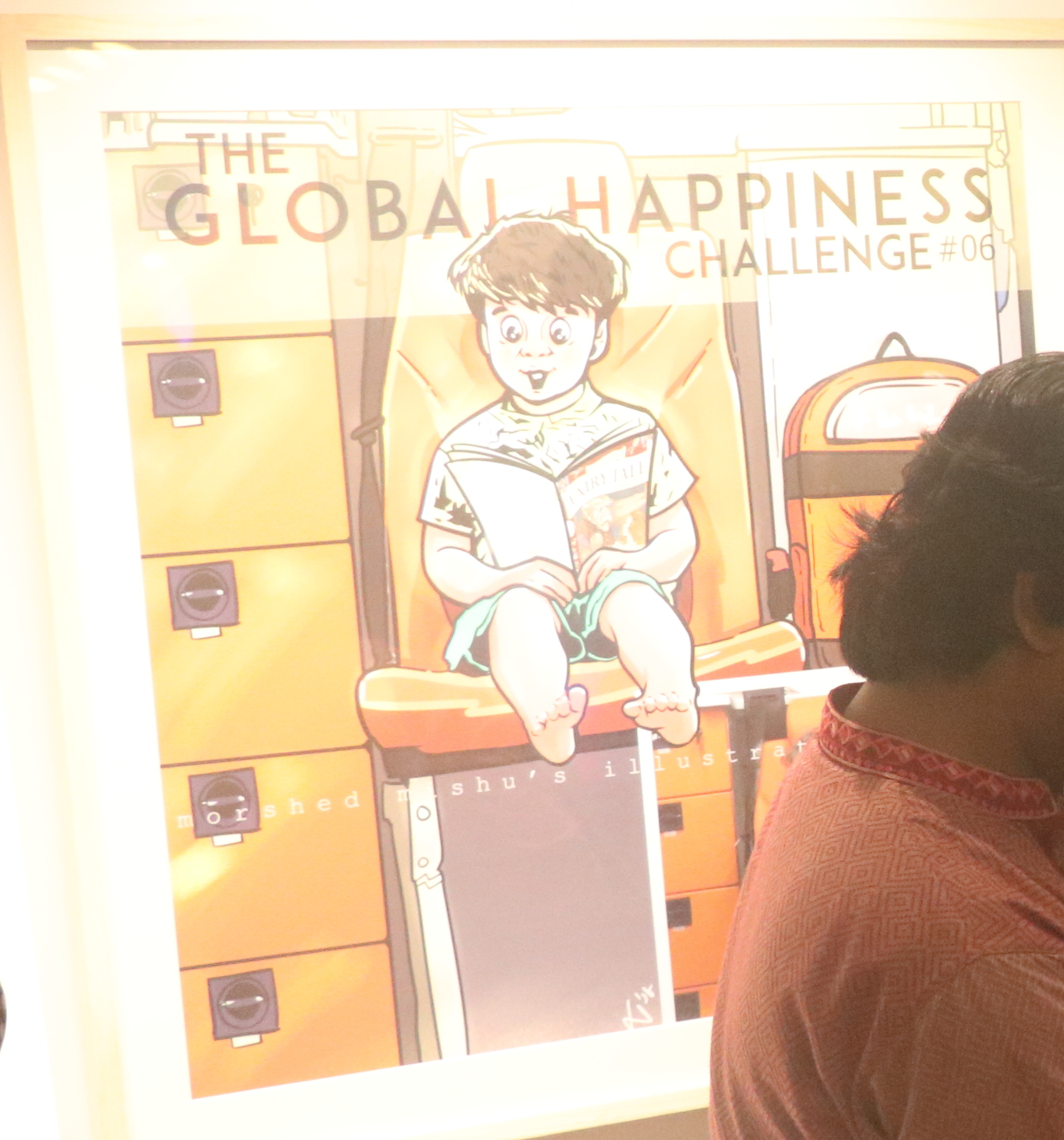
The Global Happiness Challenge No.06

Applications for iPhone and Android of the magazine was launched on 9 April 2013, by Reverie Corporation Limited.

== Publishing history ==
Unmad was founded in Dhaka, Bangladesh by Kazi Khaleed Ashraf and Ishtiaq Hossain. The first issue was dated May 1978. The schedule was initially quarterly, but it switched to a monthly schedule in 1991. Normally, each issue is 28 pages, with longer special issues at the two holidays Eid al-Fitr and Eid al-Adha. An issue typically contains between eight and ten "stories", each drawn by a different cartoonist. Management has not sold advertisising because of the effort required to do so, and to avoid editorial influence by advertisers.

== Writers ==
“Unmad's style is more about self-criticism, he is bullying himself, he is the insane person while everyone else is sane and by reversing the lens as such, the social commentary becomes poignant. But at the end of the day, the reader realises that it is not the case, and reality, in fact, is rather crazy. The writer is employing negative psychology to highlight the discrepancies of reality.”

—Mehedi Haque, executive editor, Unmad

“This is a time of saturated information; but this information is not knowledge. The job of the cartoonist is to convert information into knowledge. The knowledge, then, has to be transformed into wisdom. Wisdom is what can be useful for society.”

- Ahsan Habib, editor, Unmad
- Ahsan Habib
- Ishtiaq Hossain
- Kazi Khaleed Ashraf

== Artists ==
- Ahsan Habib
- Ishtiaq Hossain
- Kazi Khaleed Ashraf
- Mehedi Haque
- Tanmoy
- Arif Iqbal
- Faridur Reza Razib
- Hasib Kamal
- Biplob
- Muhammad Ayan
- Natasha Jahan Maya
