= 22nd Bachsas Awards =

Bangladeshi film awards ceremony in 2000

- Awarded for: outstanding performers of the silver screen, small screen, music, dance and theatre in 1999
- Awarded by: Bangladesh Cholochitra Sangbadik Samity (Bangladesh Cine-Journalists' Association)
- Presented by: Bangladesh Cholochitra Sangbadik Samity (Bangladesh Cine-Journalists' Association)
- Announced on: 2000
- Presented on: 2000
- Site: Dhaka, Bangladesh

Highlights
- Best Film: Srabon Megher Din
- Best Actor: Zahid Hasan (Srabon Megher Din)

The 22nd Bachsas Awards were given by Bangladesh Cholochitra Sangbadik Samity (Bangladesh Cine-Journalists' Association) to outstanding performers of the silver screen, small screen, music, dance and theatre in 1999. Awards was introduced in 1972 to encourage the fledgling film industry of the country.

== List of winners ==
=== Film ===
Name of Awards	Winner(s)	Film
Best Film		Srabon Megher Din
Best Director		
Best Actor	Zahid Hasan	Srabon Megher Din
Best Actress		
Best Supporting Actor		
Best Supporting Actress		
Best Music Director	Maksud Jamil Mintu	Srabon Megher Din
Best Lyrics	Humayun Ahmed	Srabon Megher Din
Best Male Playback Singer	Bari Siddiqui	Srabon Megher Din
Best Female Playback Singer		
Best Story	Humayun Ahmed	Srabon Megher Din
Best Dialogue		
Best Cinematography	Mahfuzur Rahman Khan	Srabon Megher Din
Best Art Direction	Dhrubo Esh	Srabon Megher Din
Best Sound Recording	Mofizul Haque	Srabon Megher Din

=== Theatre ===
Name of Awards	Winner(s)	Theatre
Best Theatre Group		Prachyanat
