= 19th Bangladesh National Film Awards =

National Film Awards, Bangladesh

- Awarded for: Best of bangladeshi cinema in 1994
- Awarded by: President of Bangladesh
- Presented by: Ministry of Information
- Presented on: 1995
- Site: Dhaka, Bangladesh
- Official website: www.moi.gov.bd

Highlights
- Best Feature Film: Aguner Poroshmoni
- Best Non-feature Film: Thikana
- Best Actor: Alamgir; Desh Premik
- Best Actress: Bipasha Hayat; Aguner Poroshmoni
- Most awards: Aguner Poroshmoni (8)

The 19th Bangladesh National Film Awards were presented by the Ministry of Information, Bangladesh, to felicitate the best of Bangladeshi cinema released in the year 1994. The ceremony took place in Dhaka, and awards were given by the president of Bangladesh. The National Film Awards are the only film awards given by the government itself. Every year, a national panel appointed by the government selects the winning entry, and the award ceremony is held in Dhaka. 1994 was the 19th ceremony of the National Film Awards.

== List of winners ==
This year artists received awards in 23 categories.

=== Merit awards ===
Name of Awards	Winner(s)	Film
Best Film	Humayun Ahmed (Producer)	Aguner Poroshmoni
Best Short Film	Rezanur Rahman (Director)	Thikana
Best Director	Kazi Hayat	Desh Premik
Best Actor	Alamgir	Desh Premik
Best Actress	Bipasha Hayat	Aguner Poroshmoni
Best Actor in a Supporting Role	Amol Bose	Ajker Protibad
Best Actress in a Supporting Role	Anwara	Ontare Ontare
Best Child Artist	Shila Ahmed	Aguner Poroshmoni
Best Music Director	Satya Saha	Aguner Poroshmoni
Best Lyrics	Masud Karim	Hridoy Theke Hridoy
Best Male Playback Singer	Khalid Hasan Milu	Hridoy Theke Hridoy
Best Female Playback Singer	Runa Laila	Ontare Ontare

=== Technical awards ===
Name of Awards	Winner(s)	Film
Best Art Direction	Abdus Sabur	Ghatak
Best Screenplay	Kazi Hayat	Desh Premik
Best Story	Humayun Ahmed	Aguner Poroshmoni
Best Cinematography	Kazi Bashir; Hasan Ahmed	Ghrina; Ghorer Shotru
Best Dialogue	Humayun Ahmed	Aguner Poroshmoni
Best Editing	Jinnat Hossain	Commander
Best Sound Editing	Mafizul Haque	Aguner Poroshmoni
Best Choreography	Amir Hossain Babu	The Desperate
Best Makeup	Kazi Harun	Hridoy Theke Hridoy

=== Special awards ===
- Special Award - Ashish Kumar Loh (posthumous)
- Best Child Artist (Special) - Hosne Ara Putul (Aguner Poroshmoni)

== See also ==
- Meril Prothom Alo Awards
- Ifad Film Club Award
- Babisas Award
