= Shyamol Chhaya =

2004 film

- DVD Cover
- Directed by: Humayun Ahmed
- Written by: Humayun Ahmed
- Produced by: Impress Telefilm Ltd.
- Starring: Humayun Faridi; Challenger; Riaz; Monir Khan Shimul; Ahmed Rubel; Tania Ahmed; Meher Afroz Shaon; Dr.Ezazul Islam; Faruk Ahmed; Shadhin Khosru; Shamima Nazneen; Hosne Ara Putul; Rahmat Ali
- Cinematography: Anwar Hossain
- Edited by: Atiqur Rahman Mollick
- Music by: Maksud Jamil Mintu
- Distributed by: Impress Telefilm Ltd.
- Release date: 16 December 2004
- Running time: 110 minutes
- Country: Bangladesh
- Language: Bengali

Shyamol Chhaya (Bengali: শ্যামল ছায়া; English: The Green Shade) is a 2004 Bangladeshi Bengali-language film. It was written and directed by Humayun Ahmed. Stars Humayun Faridi, Challenger, Riaz, Monir Khan Shimul, Ahmed Rubel, Tania Ahmed, Meher Afroz Shaon, Dr.Ezazul Islam, Faruque Ahmed, Shadhin Khosru, Shamima Nazneen, Hosne Ara Putul, Rahmat Ali and many more. It reflects a story of the Bangladesh War of Independence, 1971.

Shyamol Chhaya was Bangladesh's submission to the 78th Academy Awards in the 'Foreign Language Film' category. However, it was not nominated.

This is the story of a group of people leaving their homes to escape the tyrannical Pakistani military during the 1971 Bangladesh Liberation war. The story focuses on the diverse group of characters as they make their way by boat, with the shadow of war constantly present in the background. As the journey progresses alongside the war, we see the character development of the passengers, as the war and their journey pushes them to their most extreme selves.

== Cast ==
- Humayun Faridi as the Commander of the Freedom Fighters
- Challenger
- Riaz as Maulana
- Monir Khan Shimul as a Bengali-German engineer
- Tania Ahmed as Ratri
- Meher Afroz Shaon as Ashalata
- Ahmed Rubel as Pitamber
- Dr.Ezazul Islam as a boatman addressed as Ustad by Kallu
- Faruque Ahmed as Kallu, Ustad's sidekick and assistant boatman
- Shadhin Khosru as Gaurango, Ashalata's husband
- Shamima Nazneen
- Hosne Ara Putul as Putul
- Rahmat Ali
- Syed Akhtar Ali
- Jasmine Parvez
- Zahid Hossain Shovon as Ratri's Husband

== Release ==
=== Festivals ===
- 6th Bangladesh Film Festival 2005. London
- 11th Kolkata Film Festival 2005. India
- International Palm Spring Film Festival 2006. USA
- The 32nd Seattle International Film Festival 2006. USA
- FIBOFEST Film Festival, Prague, 2006. Czech Republic
- East End Film Festival 2006. London
- East London Film Festival 2006. London
- South Asian Film Festival 2009. GOA, India.
- Film Festival Featuring Liberation War Kolkata 2010. India

=== Critical response ===
Robert Koehler of Variety gave the film a negative review, calling it "symbolic to a fault", and saying Humayun Ahmed didn't have the directorial skills to enliven the story.

== Awards and achievement ==
The Bangladesh Federation of Film Societies (BFFS) chose Shyamol Chhaya as the Bangladeshi submission to the 78th Academy Awards in the 'Foreign Language Film' category. The Academy of Motion Picture Arts and Sciences did not select it as one of the five nominees in 2006.

=== 6th Bangladesh Film Festival ===
- Winner Best Contemporary Film - 2005. London

=== Bachosach Film Awards ===
- Winner Best supporting Actress - Tania Ahmed

== Home media ==
Shyamol Chhaya film's VCD and DVD copy rights were taken by Channel i and G-Series.
