= Ekta Chilo Sonar Konya =

Song by Subir Nandi

from the album Srabon Megher Din
- Language: Bengali
- Released: 1999
- Recorded: 1998
- Studio: Sustain Recording Studio
- Venue: Dhaka, Bangladesh
- Genre: Folk music; Film score
- Length: 4:17
- Label: Sangeeta Music
- Composer: Maksud Jamil Mintu
- Lyricist: Humayun Ahmed
- Producer: Maksud Jamil Mintu

External media

Audio
- "Ekta Chilo Sonar Konya" on YouTube

Video
- "Ekta Chilo Sonar Konya" on YouTube

"Ekta Chilo Sonar Konya" is a song from the 1999 Bangladeshi film Srabon Megher Din. The lyricist of this folk music was Humayun Ahmed. Subir Nandi sang this song to the tune with music arrangement of Maksud Jamil Mintu. The song is considered to be the most popular song used in the film. The song was released under label of Sangeeta Music along with other songs from the audio album. Mahfuz Ahmed lip-synced in the scene of this song in the film. Maksud Jamil Mintu and Subir Nandi won the National Film Award for music arrangement and vocals.

== Background ==
Humayun Ahmed made his debut as the lyricist of the film through Srabon Megher Din, but did not compose the song "Ekta Chilo Sonar Konya" for use in the film. The song was included in the film due to its consistency with the story. Humayun Ahmed had earlier nominated Subir Nandi to sing the song. After writing the song, Maqsood Jamil was provided with the song to compose, but according to Maksud Jamil, he forgot to compose the song.

== Record and release ==
The song "Ekta Chilo Sonar Konya" was recorded in 1998 at the Sustain Recording Studio in Shantinagar, Dhaka. Usually the song is recorded in the artist's voice after the music director's melody. Maksud Jamil did not pre-arrange the vocals for the song. The melody and vocals of the song were composed at the same time. Subir Nandi's throat was held and recorded after Maksud's recitation in each verse.

The song was released from Sangeeta Music as part of the audio album of the film Srabon Megher Din. Sangeeta Music released the song as a solo music on YouTube on 11 May, 2019. Earlier, Laser Vision released the video of the song on YouTube on 26 December, 2016.

== Achievement ==
The song "Ekta Chilo Sonar Konya" was the first joint work of composer Maksud Jamil Mintu and Subir Nandi. For this song, Maksud Jamil and Subir Nandi won the awards for "Best Music Director" and "Best Male Vocalist" at the 24th Bangladesh National Film Awards.

Year	Award	Nomination	Category	Result	Ref
1999	National Film Awards	Maksud Jamil Mintu	Best Music Director	Won	
1999	National Film Awards	Subir Nandi	Best Male Playback Singer	Won	
