= Dui Duari =

Bangladeshi film

- VCD Cover
- Directed by: Humayun Ahmed
- Written by: Humayun Ahmed
- Produced by: Nuhash Chalachitra
- Starring: Riaz; Mahfuz Ahmed; Meher Afroz Shaon; Masud Ali Khan; Amirul Haque Chowdhury; Dr.Ezazul Islam; Shamima Nazneen; Shabnam Parvin; Nasima Khan
- Cinematography: Mahfuzur Rahman Khan
- Edited by: Atikur Rahman Mollick
- Music by: Maksud Jamil Mintu NishanBlues
- Distributed by: Nuhash Chalachitra
- Release date: 2000
- Running time: 140 minutes
- Country: Bangladesh
- Language: Bengali

Dui Duari (transl. Two Doors) also (Bengali: দুই দুয়ারী) is a Bangladeshi Bengali-language film. The film was released in 2000. It was directed by Bangladeshi famous novelist, film director-writer Humayun Ahmed, produced and distributed by his film producer-distributor company called as Nuhash Chalachitra. Stars include Riaz, Mahfuz Ahmed, Meher Afroz Shaon, Masud Ali Khan, Amirul Haque Chowdhury, Dr.Ezazul Islam, Shamima Nazneen, Shabnam Parvin, Nasima Khan and many more.

For their contributions in the film, Riaz and singer Sabina Yasmin were honored in the National Film Awards of Bangladesh as they won the best actor award and the best female singer award 2000 respectively. Riaz played the role of a unique character Rahossa Manob(English: Mystery Man).

== Plot ==
Taru's father and little brother 'Tagor' go by car on forest side road. Unfortunately, a young man 'Rahossa Manob' with a guitar widens his two hands in the middle of the road. Taru's car driver wants to brake to save the man, but it is impossible. So, a small accident occurs. Taru's father takes Rahossa Manob in their car and takes him home. Rahossa Manob in the meantime feels good, Taru's father sends him some money with his servant 'Mobarak'. But Mobarak arranges him a rickshaw and 100 money. Sometime later Rahossa Manob comes back to Taru's home. Taru does not like him but Tagor likes him a lot. Taru' and 'Shafiq Ahmed' love each other. Taru decides to wait for Shafiq until he finds a good job. Taru's aunt is locked in a room and her leg is tied with a chain, because she is a mentally ill. One day, Taru's aunt goes out of the room and attempts to hit Togor's Teacher as he scolded her (Taru's aunt's) loved nephew, Tagor. At the time Rahossa Manob calls Taru's aunt and she stands up and seeing him she cools down and becomes okay. Rahossa Manob gives advice to Taru's father about informing his sister that, she had become well and she doesn't need to be locked-up anymore. After fixing all the problems in Taru's home, Rahossa Manob wears his hat and takes his guitar and goes down to the road, then he goes to the place in which the accident took place. And widens his hand, just like he did before.

== Cast ==
- Riaz as Rahossa Manob
- Meher Afroz Shaon as Taru
- Mahfuz Ahmed as Shafiq Ahmed
- Dr.Ezazul Islam as Mobarak Miah
- Masud Ali Khan as Taru's Father
- Nasima Khan as Taru's Mother
- Shabnam Parvin as Kudrati Begum
- Amirul Haque Chowdhury as Tagor's Teacher
- Shamima Nazneen as Taru's Aunt
- Dr. Karim
- Shuvro as Togor
- Jajal Islam
- Majibur Rahman
- Deepak Kumar Sur
- Pranesh Chowdhury
- E T Naser

Cameo

- Challenger as a train passenger

== Music ==
Dui Duari

Soundtrack album by Maksud Jamil Mintu
- Released: 2000
- Recorded: 2000
- Genre: Feature film soundtrack
- Producer: Nuhash Chalachitra

Maksud Jamil Mintu chronology
Srabon Megher Din (1999)	Dui Duari (2000)	Chandrokotha (2003)

Dui Duari film music directed by Maksud Jamil Mintu. And lyrics by the film director Humayun Ahmed. But the films used a song named Lilabali Lilabali collected from Bangladeshi old cultures and a Rabindra Sangeet, titled Dure Kothao.

=== Soundtrack ===
Tracks	Titles	Singers	Writers	Notes
1	Nachilore Konna Nachilore	Meher Afroz Shaon	Humayun Ahmed	
2	Barshar Prothom Dine	Sabina Yasmin	Humayun Ahmed	
3	Mathay Porechhi Sada Cap	Agun	Humayun Ahmed	Title Song
4	Lilabali Lilabali	Runa Laila and assistant singers	Collected	
5	Sohagpur Gramey Ekta	Selim Chowdhury	Humayun Ahmed	
6	Dure Kothao	Meher Afroz Shaon	Rabindranath Tagore	
7	Dui Duari OST	NishanBlues		

== Award and achievements ==
=== National Film Awards ===
- Winner Best Actor, Riaz 2000
- Winner Best Female Singer, Sabina Yasmin 2000 (song as Barshar Prothom Dine)
