= Bijori Barkatullah =

Bangladeshi actress and dancer

- বিজরী বরকতউল্লাহ
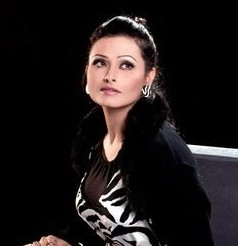
- Education: University of Dhaka
- Occupations: Actress, dancer
- Years active: 1993-present
- Spouses: Intekhab Dinar (m. 2013); Shawkat Ali Emon (m. 1995; div. 2012)
- Children: 1
- Parents: Mohammad Barkatullah (father); Zeenat Barkatullah (mother)

Bijori Barkatullah is a Bangladeshi television actress and dancer.

== Early life ==
Barkatullah graduated from the Department of History at the University of Dhaka.

== Career ==
Barkatullah acted her first drama, Shukher Chharpotro, directed by her father Mohammad Barkatullah in 1988. She got her breakthrough by her performance in the drama serial Kothao Keu Nei. Later she acted in Megh Kalo with Mahfuz Ahmed, directed by Abdus Sattar. She acted in a play based on the movie Jibon Theke Neya by Zahir Raihan.

Bijori is also engaged in modeling and dancing.

== Personal life ==
Bijori is the daughter of Mohammad Barkatullah and Zeenat Barkatullah. Mohammad was a dance artist who later turned into a television producer. Zeenat was also a dance artist who won Bangladesh Shilpakala Academy award in 2008. Bijori's sister Kajori Barkatullah is a producer and a host.

Barkatullah married Intekhab Dinar, another Bangladeshi actor, on April 14, 2013. She was previously married to Shawkat Ali Emon, a music director, from 1995 until 2012. They have a daughter – Urbana Shawkat.

== Works ==
Television

- Chharpotro
- Oh Boy
- Kothao Keu Nei
- Megh Kalo
- Batighar
- Autri
- Corporate
- Mukh o Mukhorata
- Kachhakachhi

Film

- Aynabaji (2017) - Special Appearance

Web Series

- Karagar (2022)
- Jodi Ami Beche Firi (2022) - Shahnaz
