= Bhuban Majhi =

- Theatrical release poster
- Bengali: ভুবন মাঝি
- Directed by: Fakhrul Arefeen Khan
- Screenplay by: Fakhrul Arefeen Khan
- Story by: Fakhrul Arefeen Khan
- Produced by: Fakhrul Arefeen Khan
- Starring: Parambrata Chatterjee; Quazi Nawshaba Ahmed; Mamunur Rashid
- Music by: Kalikaprasad Bhattacharjee
- Production companies: Gorai Films (with sponsored Govt. of Bangladesh); Reflect Media Communications Ltd
- Release date: 3 March 2017
- Country: Bangladesh
- Language: Bengali

Bhuban Majhi (Bengali: ভুবন মাঝি) is a Bangladeshi film based on the Bangladeshi War of Independence. It was directed and produced by Fakhrul Arefeen Khan, starring the Indian actor Parambrata Chatterjee and Bangladeshi actress Aparna Ghosh. It was released on March 3, 2017.

Bhuban Majhi explores two time periods simultaneously – 1970 to 1971, and 2004 to 2013, Arefin explains. The film opens in 1970, depicting the rise of a rebel in a common man, played by Parambrata, who struggles with his ideals, and ends with the philosophy of Baul Ananda Shai in 2013.

Nahir, played by Parambrata, comes to Kushtia to complete his graduation a few days before the 1970 election. The ongoing countrywide turmoil revolving around the movement for independence in the then East Pakistan, and the elections don't seem to move him in the slightest. All he seems to be bothered with is his love for theatre and Farida.

Nahir, like many of us, has many layers to his personality, believes Parambrata. "There is always an element of doubt and hesitation in the mind of a sensible person. Whenever something happens around us, we prefer to mull over it before jumping to conclusions." The character of Nahir is not any different from that, as he too embodies the contradictory nature of most humans. As a patriot, Nahir feels the urge to take part in the war, but the artist in him wants to attain independence in a peaceful manner.

== Cast ==
- Parambrata Chatterjee as Nadir
- Aparna Ghosh as Farida
- Quazi Nawshaba Ahmed as Elei
- Mamunur Rashid as Boro Hujur
- Maznun Mizan as Mizan
- Salman Muqtadir as Sohel
- Sushoma Sarkar as Nurse
- Lalim Huq as Nahir Shai

== See also ==
- Cinema of Bangladesh
- Dhallywood
