= Ejajul Islam =

Bangladeshi physician and actor

- এজাজুল ইসলাম
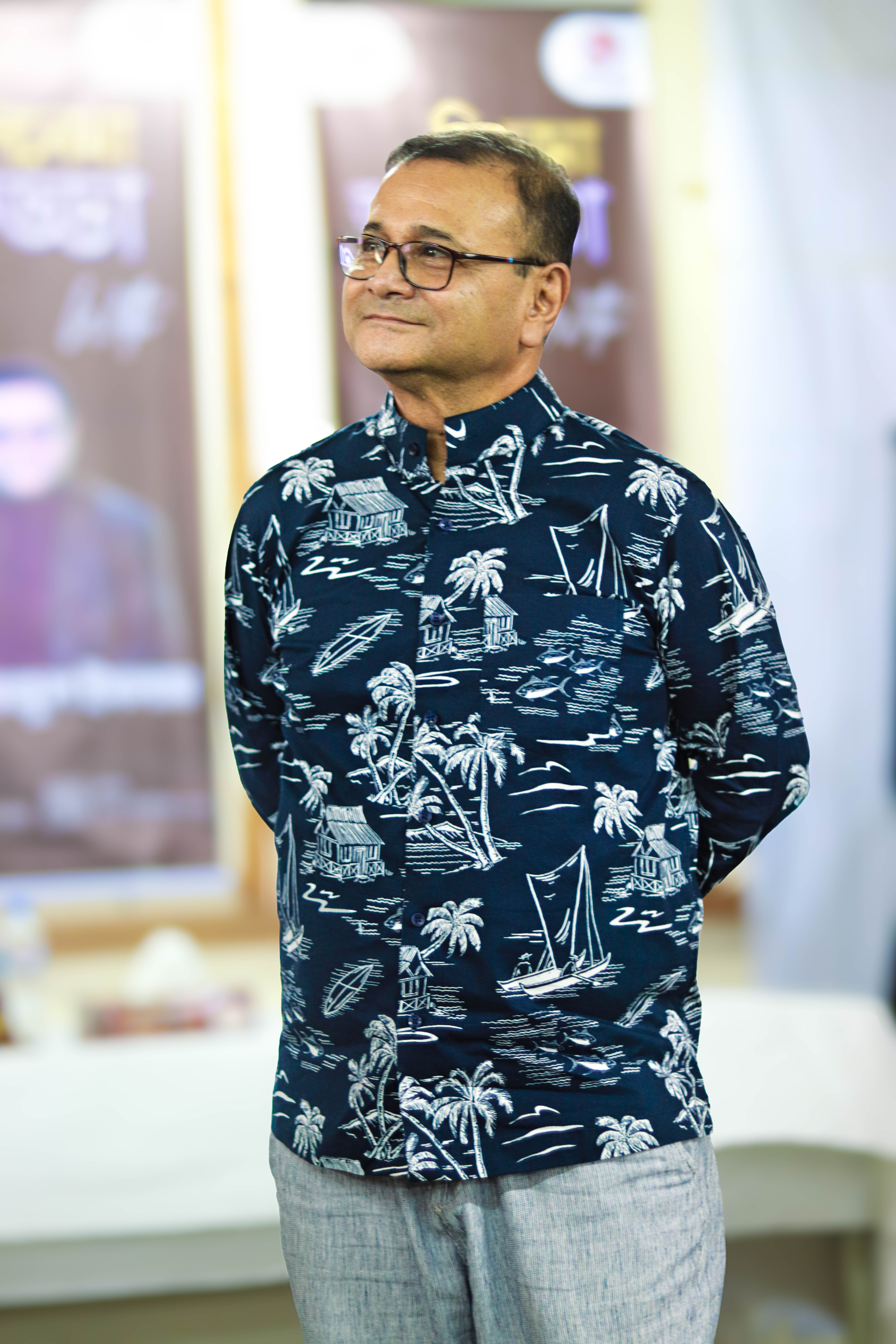
- Ejajul Islam in 2025
- Born: 1960 (age 65–66); Sadullapur Upazila, Gaibandha District, Bangladesh
- Other name: Dr. Ejaj
- Education: Rangpur Medical College; Bangladesh Medical University
- Occupations: Doctor, theater and film actor
- Years active: 1999–present
- Notable work: Dui Duari; Taarkata
- Awards: National Film Award (1 time)

Ejajul Islam (Bengali: এজাজুল ইসলাম), also known by as Dr. Ejaj, is a Bangladeshi physician and actor who appears in Bangladeshi television shows and films.

== Early life and education ==
Ejajul graduated with an MBBS from Rangpur Medical College in 1984. Then he completed his postgraduate diploma in Nuclear Medicine (DNM) from Bangladesh Medical University. He was the head of the Nuclear Medicine Department at Dhaka Medical College Hospital until his retirement in 2020.

== Acting career ==
Islam is popularly known for his role as one of the recurring characters in Humayun Ahmed's television drama series, Tara Tin Jon.

== Personal life ==
He has a son, Abubakar Siddique.

== Works ==
=== Films ===
- Srabon Megher Din (1999)
- Dui Duari (2001)
- Chandrokotha (2003)
- Shyamol Chhaya (2004)
- Tok Jhaal Mishti (2005)
- Noy Number Bipod Sanket (2006)
- Banglar Bou (2006)
- Mayer Morjada (2006)
- Bidrohi Padma (2006)
- Rupkothar Golpo (2006)
- Hridoyer Kotha (2006)
- Swamir Songshar (2007)
- Jhontu Montu Dui Bhai (2007)
- Tomakei Khujchi (2008)
- Amar Ache Jol (2008)
- Mia Barir Chakor (2009)
- Moynamotir Songshar (2010)
- Khoj: The Search (2010)
- Chaya Chobi (2012)‡
- Tumi Ashbe Bole (2012)
- Taarkata (2014)
- Parapaar (2014)
- Ek Cup Cha (2015)
- Ki Darun Dekhte (2014)
- Kothin Protishodh (2014)
- Prarthona (2015)
- Orpita (2018)
- Raat Jaga Phool (2021)
- Rajkumar (2024)
- Taandob (2025)
- Bonolota Express (2026)

=== Drama Serial ===
- Ure Jai Bokpakkhi (2005)
- Sobuj Sathi
- Hablonger Bajare
- Chandra Karigor
- Vober Hat (2006-2007)
- Shanti Odhidoptor (2015)
- Nagar Jonaki (2015)
- Lorai (2015-2016)
- Jiboner Oligoli (2015-2016)
- Samraat (2016)
- Kokkho Number 52 (2016)
- Dhamaka Offer (2019)
- Shanti Molom 10 Taka (2022)

=== Web series ===
- Sabrina (2022)
