= Aaj Robibar =

1996 Bangladeshi TV series

- DVD release cover
- Genre: Comedy, drama
- Created by: Humayun Ahmed
- Written by: Humayun Ahmed
- Directed by: Monir Hossain Jibon
- Starring: Abul Khair; Aly Zaker; Abul Hayat; Amjad Hossain; Shuja Khondokar; Fazlul Kabir Tuhin; Suborna Mustafa; Zahid Hasan; Faruque Ahmed; Meher Afroz Shaon; Shila Ahmed; Saleh Ahmed; Dipak Kumar Sur
- Theme music composer: Maksud Jamil Mintu
- Opening theme: "Loke Bole" and "Nisha Lagilo Re" by Hason Raja
- Composer: Maksud Jamil Mintu
- Country of origin: Bangladesh
- Original language: Bengali
- No. of episodes: 7

Production
- Production location: Bangladesh Television Studios
- Cinematography: Mahmudur Rahman Sharif
- Editor: Ahmed Shopon
- Running time: Around 50 minutes
- Production company: Nuhash Chalachitra

Original release
- Network: BTV
- Release: 1996 – 1996

Aaj Robibar (Bengali: আজ রবিবার; Today's Sunday) is a Bangladeshi television sitcom created by Humayun Ahmed that was originally aired on BTV in 1996. The series was directed by Monir Hossain Jibon. The lead characters were played by Abul Khair, Abul Hayat, Zahid Hasan, Meher Afroz Shaon, Shila Ahmed, Faruque Ahmed, Asaduzzaman Noor and Suborna Mustafa. It is cited as one of the most popular sitcoms in Bangladesh of the 90's, quotes from numerous episodes have become catchphrases in popular culture. It was re-aired in Hindi on the Indian television channel Star Plus in 2017.

== Plot ==
The plot revolves around the day-to-day life of an eccentric household consisting of a man only called Dadajan ("grandpa"), his socially inept sons, two granddaughters, a boarder, the manservant and the maid.

A drama about the daily comic incidents taking place in a Dhaka household, the series' opening episode begins with Konka, the younger granddaughter who breaks the fourth wall to introduce characters and premises to the audience. She and her elder sister Titli are fun-loving girls, both secretly in love with the boarder Anis, a nerd who doesn't seem to understand social stuff and never shows affection for any of them. Their father Jamil (Abul Hayat), the middle son and an architect by profession, is fond of Hason Raja songs and after losing his wife around the time when Konka was born, falls in love with an attractive, mature and intelligent woman named Meera, whom he hires as a governess. The eldest son, Asgor is an eminent psychiatrist and also falls in love with Meera. Meanwhile, Farhad, who looks like "Baker Bhai" becomes involved with the family. Asgor, being convinced by Titli and Konka, hypnotizes Anis to induce the loving soul of him and changes him completely. Anis, then run after Titli and expresses his love for her, and seeks love in turn. In the end, Farhad goes outside with the younger brother of the house to see the miseries of the poor people of the street, and the younger brother says, he does not need not to be a Himu anymore if Farhad becomes one.

== Cast ==
- Abul Khair as Dadajan, head of the household
- Aly Zaker as Asgor, the eldest son who is a psychiatrist
- Abul Hayat as Jamil, Dadajan's middle son who is an architect
- Asaduzzaman Noor as Farhad
- Fazlul Kabir Tuhin as the youngest son, "Himu"
- Suja Khondokar as Prof. Khan Majlish
- Zahid Hasan as Anis, the boarder
- Suborna Mustafa as Meera
- Shila Ahmed as Konka, Titli's younger sister
- Shaon as Titli, the elder granddaughter
- Faruque Ahmed as Moti, the manservant
- Nasrin as Fuli, the maid
- Saleh Ahmed as the police O.C
- Dipak Kumar Sur as the patient of Asgor
- Shilpa

== Music ==
Songs created by Hason Raja were used in the drama.

- Music direction, composition and music: Maksud Jamil Mintu
- Lead vocals: Selim Chowdhury
- Vocals: Fazlul Kabir Tuhin
