= Saleh Ahmed (actor) =

Bangladeshi actor (died 2019)

- সালেহ আহমেদ
- Born: 1936/1937; Sariakandi, Bogra, Bengal Presidency, British India
- Died: 24 April 2019 (aged 83); Dhaka, Bangladesh
- Occupation: Actor

Saleh Ahmed (1936/1937 – 24 April 2019) was a Bangladeshi television, film and stage actor.

== Life and career ==
Ahmed was born in Sariakandi, Bogra. He started acting at a young age with a Mymensingh-based troupe named Amraboti Natyamancho. After his retirement from the Department of Public Health Engineering in 1991, he started acting on a regular basis.

== Death ==
Ahmed died on 24 April 2019 at the age of 83.

== Works ==
=== TV dramas ===
- Aaj Robibar
- Kothao Keu Nei
- Ure Jai Bok Pokkhi
- Vara Basha Bhalo Basha

=== Films ===
- Amar Ache Jol
- Srabon Megher Din
- Aguner Poroshmoni
