= Shabnam Parvin =

Bangladeshi actress

- শবনম পারভীন
- Born: 1966 (age 59–60)
- Occupations: Film actress, director, producer
- Years active: 1982–present

Shabnam Parvin (born 1966) is a Bangladeshi actress, director, and producer.

== Career ==
Shabnam Parvin started her acting career in 1982, performing on stage in a play entitled Kumar Khalir Char, against the wishes of her parents. Later she appeared in television and radio plays. Parvin performed in a TV play Duti Gaan-Er Ekti Shur, aired in 1982 and produced by Alauddin Ahemed. In 1985 she made her film debut in Agun Pani, directed by K. M. Ayub.

=== As a producer ===
Shabnam Parvin has also produced several films, with her production house Sabnam Films. Her first production was Mrittundondo, followed by Papi Shatru, Sotter Songram, Voyungkor Nari, Durdhirso Pamela and Kukkhato Jorina. She has also produced some drama for television.

=== TV programmes and shows ===
Sabnam Parvin is now more famous for Bangladesh Television (BTV) magazine programme Ittadi as a Nani-Nati. She stars in this show as a comic Grandmother (Nani) with her Grandson (Nati). She has also appeared in shows such as Cooking, Rannga Pori Amar Ami and others.

== Personal and family life ==
Sabnam Parvin lives in Uttara Thana. In 2008, while the house was under construction, a gang of robbers forced their way in, stole jewellery and cash worth 800,000 taka, and tied up the family, leading to the death of Shabnam's father.

== Filmography ==
Films
Year	Title	Director	Co-artist
1985	Agun Pani	KM Ayub	
	Sukhtara	Zillur Rahaman	
1987	Dui Jibon	Abdullah Al Mamun	
	Sish Mahal	Azizur Rahaman	
	Lawarish	Akhbar Kabir Pintu	
	Apon Ghor	Mostofa Anower	
	Ghor Amar Ghor	Belal Ahemed	
	Borjopath	Ahemed Satter	
	Rani Chawdhurani	Noor Mohammad Moni	
	Omor Songi	Alomgir Kumkum	
	Gorer Sukh	Nurul Haque Bassu	
	Loho Manob	Nur Muhammad Moni	
	Miah Vai	Chashi Nazrul Islam	
	Gorbiber Bow	Kamal Ahmed	
	Sosur Bari	Azizur Rahaman Buli	
	Prem Jamuna	Kazi Morshed	
	Khuner Badla	Kamruzzaman	
	Disko Baidani	Zillur Rahaman	
	Ora Loraku	Sopon Chowdhury	
	Emandar Mastan	Zillur Rahaman	
	Baba Masthan	Zillur Rahaman	
	Sopner Valobasa	Zillur Rahaman	
	Bashaw	Montazur Rahman Akhbor	
	Action Lady	Momtazur Rahman Akhbor	
	Voyonkor Dangu	Ostad Jahangir Alam	
	Rajniti	Jibon Chowdhury	
2006	Rupkothar Golpo	Tauquir Ahmed	
2002	Itihash	Kazi Hayat	
	Tomake Khujssi	Motin Rahman	
	Shami Hara Sundori	Nader Khan	
	Bolo Na kobul	Shadat Hossain Liton	
	Baba Mar Shawpno	Reza Lotif	
	Vanga Mon	Mukul Khan	
	Mittudondo (Producer)		
	PAPI SOTRU (Producer)		
	Sotter Songram (Producer)		
	VOINGKOR NARI (Producer)		
	Durdhorso Pamela (Producer)		
	KUKKATHAO JORINA (Producer & title role)		
2001	Dui Duari	Humayun Ahmed	
2006	Noy Number Bipod Sanket	Humayun Ahmed	
2016	Swatta		
	Tumar jonno Mon Kande		
	Premer Odhiker		
	Mayabini		
2017	Junction Manuser jonno "Not a Pirith Story"	Naimul Kabir	
2017	Rong Dhong	Ahsan Sarowar	
	Capabaja	Hasan Jahangir	

== TV drama and serials ==
Drama
Name	Director	Channel
Eti Tumar Amar	Ahmed Eusuf Saber	
Jekhane Simanto	Ahmed Eusuf Saber	
Bibvrat	Babul Ahemed	
Bristir Opekkha	Mohon Khan	
14 Inch-e Sada kalo (TV play)	Sabnam Parvin	
Prem Jane Na Roshik Kala Chan	Sabnam Parvin	
Dhua Tulshi Pata (TV play)	Sabnam Parvin	
Emon Moja Hoy Na	Sabnam Parvin	
Shopno Kheya (serial)	Sabnam Parvin	
Shamudro Bilash Privat Limited	Humayun Ahmed	
Grihosukh Privat Limited	Humayun Ahmed	
Openti Bioscope	Humayun Ahmed	
Sobai Geche Bone	Humayun Ahmed	
Tara Tin Jon	Humayun Ahmed	
Nogor-e Doitto	Humayun Ahmed	
Cheley Dekha	Humayun Ahmed	
Tara Tin Jon: Virus	Humayun Ahmed	
Natto Mongoler Kotha Sune Guni Jone	Humayun Ahmed	
Turuper Tash	Humayun Ahmed	
Patro Dekha	Humayun Ahmed	
Jora Shalik	Sumon Anower	
