= Asif Nazrul =

Bangladeshi political adviser, professor and writer

- আসিফ নজরুল
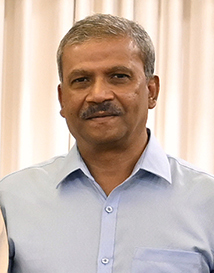
- Nazrul in 2025

Adviser for Law, Justice and Parliamentary Affairs
- In office 9 August 2024 – 17 February 2026
- President: Mohammed Shahabuddin
- Chief Adviser: Muhammad Yunus
- Preceded by: Anisul Huq (as Minister)
- Succeeded by: Md Asaduzzaman (as Minister)

Adviser for Expatriates Welfare and Overseas Employment
- In office 16 August 2024 – 17 February 2026
- President: Mohammed Shahabuddin
- Chief Adviser: Muhammad Yunus
- Preceded by: Shafiqur Rahaman Chowdhury (as State Minister)
- Succeeded by: Nurul Haque Nur (as State Minister)

Adviser for Youth and Sports
- In office 11 December 2025 – 17 February 2026
- President: Mohammed Shahabuddin
- Chief Adviser: Muhammad Yunus
- Preceded by: Asif Mahmud
- Succeeded by: Aminul Haque (as State Minister)

Adviser for Cultural Affairs
- In office 16 August 2024 – 10 November 2024
- President: Mohammed Shahabuddin
- Chief Adviser: Muhammad Yunus
- Preceded by: Naheed Ezaher Khan (as Minister)
- Succeeded by: Mostofa Sarwar Farooki

Personal details
- Born: Mohammad Nazrul Islam; 12 January 1966 (age 60) Comilla, East Pakistan
- Party: Independent
- Spouse(s): Rokeya Prachi (m. 2004; div. 2013) Shila Ahmed (m. 2013)
- Education: University of Dhaka (LL.B, LL.M); University of London (PhD)
- Occupation: Professor of law
- Website: asifnazrul.com

Mohammad Nazrul Islam, better known as Asif Nazrul (Bengali: আসিফ নজরুল; born 12 January 1966), is a Bangladeshi writer, novelist, columnist, political commentator and a professor of law at the University of Dhaka. He was appointed an adviser to the interim government of Bangladesh in August 2024. He was responsible for the Ministry of Law, Justice and Parliamentary Affairs, the Ministry of Expatriates Welfare and Overseas Employment and the Ministry of Youth and Sports.

== Education ==
Asif Nazrul completed his LLB and LL.M. at the University of Dhaka in 1986 and 1987 respectively, and garnered his PhD degree from the SOAS University of London in 1999. Afterwards he did post-doctoral work at the Environmental Law Center in Germany.

== Career ==
Nazrul worked as a journalist and an administrative officer of the Bangladesh government before becoming a professor of law at the University of Dhaka.

From 2011 to 2017, Asif Nazrul served as a bureau member of South Asians for Human Rights (SAHR), a regional network dedicated to promoting human rights in South Asia.

In 1992, Asif Nazrul was associated with the Ekattorer Ghatak Dalal Nirmul Committee, a group founded to demand the trial of war criminals from the Bangladesh Liberation War. During his time with the committee, he contributed writings supporting the Liberation War and opposing figures like Delwar Hossain Sayeedi. However, he later distanced himself from the organization.

After the fall of Sheikh Hasina following an uprising, he was appointed an adviser to the interim government on 8 August 2024.

== Threats and legal issues ==
In 2012, Nazrul was directed to appear before the High Court after a petition was filed, alleging that his remarks made during a televised talk show had incited undemocratic forces.

In 2013, his office at the University of Dhaka was reportedly set on fire with kerosene. In May of the same year, he received a death threat via telephone, which was linked to his criticism of the Sheikh Hasina administration.

In 2017, Faruk Khan filed a defamation case against him in the Madaripur District Court, citing statements perceived as defamatory toward his cousin Shajahan Khan, who was the minister of shipping at the time.

In November 2017, Nazrul faced legal action under Section 57 of the Information and Communication Technology Act, 2006 over allegedly offensive Facebook posts, which he claimed were posted from a fake account.

On 7 November 2024, Nazrul was harassed at Geneva Airport, Switzerland by individuals chanting political slogans. BNP acting chairman Tarique Rahman denounced it as an attack on state dignity. Mohammed Kamrul Islam, Labour Counsellor in Geneva, was recalled for failing to act during the episode.

== Stances and controversies ==
=== Remarks on former President Abdul Hamid and Awami League ===
On 8 May 2025, in response to the government's decision to knowingly allow former President Abdul Hamid to leave the country before facing trial for the July massacre, Sarjis Alam criticized the government, stating that the former President's departure was a major failure. He argued that the government's chief advisor Mohammad Yunus and Asif Nazrul should be held accountable.

In response, Asif Nazrul told a media outlet that there is a possibility of banning the Awami League or its affiliated organizations.

=== Arrest process of Meghna Alam ===
In April 2025, Asif Nazrul criticised the detention process of model Meghna Alam under the Special Powers Act, claiming the procedure was improper.

=== Remarks on media outlets ===
In June 2025, Nazrul publicly criticized major newspapers Prothom Alo and The Daily Star for allegedly showing bias against certain political groups, prompting debate about press freedom and his role as government adviser.

=== Medical profession remarks ===
In August 2025, the Doctors' Association of Bangladesh and the National Doctors Forum condemned Nazrul for remarks alleging some doctors overprescribe tests and collude with pharmaceutical companies. He later clarified and apologised for his comments.

=== Calls for removal from interim government role ===
In October 2024, commentators called for his removal as interim government adviser, alleging bias and favouring certain political factions.

=== Ambition for chief adviser role ===
In October 2025, reports suggested Nazrul expressed interest in becoming Chief Adviser of the interim government, sparking concerns about political neutrality.

=== Critique of social media misinformation ===
In January 2025, he warned the public about rumours and misinformation spread on social media, claiming some were linked to the Awami League and urging citizens to consult verified sources.

=== Remarks about "safe exit" ===
On 11 October 2025, he stated that advisers themselves do not require a "safe exit", but rather found that the country requires a safe exit from corruption, human rights violations, and mismanagement, prompting discussion on interim government accountability.

== Personal life ==
Nazrul married television and film actress Rokeya Prachy in May 2004. They have a daughter together. They divorced in 2013. Nazrul remarried, to Shila Ahmed (daughter of writer Humayun Ahmed), and they have a daughter together.

== Selected bibliography ==
=== Nonfictions ===
- ১/১১ সুশাসন বিতর্ক (lit. '1/11 Good Governance Debate') ISBN 9847010501858
- আওয়ামী লীগের শাসনকাল (lit. 'Ruling years of Awami League') ISBN 9789849078630

=== Fictions ===
- Nishiddha Kayekjan (Forbidden Few)
- Campuser Jubak (Youth at the Campus)
- Akrosh (Wrath)
- Pap (Sin)
- Udhao (Lost)
- Anya Alor Din (Days of other light)
- Dakhal (Control)
- Anyapaksha (The Other Side)
- Tader Ekti Rat (One Night of Theirs)
- Chonya (Touch)
- Asamptir Galpa (Tale of Incompletion)
- Bekar Diner Prem (Love at the Time of Unemployment)
- Aboydho Astrer Utsho (Source of illegal arms)
- Ami Abu Bokor
