= Maznun Mizan =

Bangladeshi film and television actor

- Notable work: Noy Number Bipod Sanket, Bhuban Majhi, Gondi
- Website: https://maznunmizan.com/

Maznun Mizan (Bengali: মাজনুন মিজান), commonly known as Mizan, is a Bangladeshi film and television actor, director. He became a favourite with the audience after his performance in Humayun Ahmed's film 'Noy Number Bipod Sonket'. Some of the notable films he has acted in include "Noy Number Bipod Sonket", Bhuvan Majhi, Gondi, Mission Extreme, Amar Ache Jol.

== Early life and career ==
In 1995, Maznon Mizan first started working on TV with a passing shot in Shahidul Haque Khan's play 'Kash Boner Kanya'. He joined the Dhaka Theater in 1999 by acting in the play 'Merchant of Venice'. Mizan worked on Kothar Ful, a special television drama based on Bangabandhu's historic 7 March broadcast in 2020, which was produced by Mohammad Imam. In 2018, he appeared in the film Bhuvan Majhi, which was co-produced by India and Bangladesh. Bhuban Majhi is a Bangladeshi film based on the Bangladeshi War of Independence.

== Works ==
=== Films ===
Year	Title	Director	Role	Note
2007	Noy Number Bipod Sanket	Humayun Ahmed	Mizan	
2008	Amar Ache Jol	Humayun Ahmed		
2016	Darpan Bishorjon	Sumon Dhar		
2016	Bossgiri	Shamim Ahamed Roni	System	
2017	Bhuban Majhi	Fakhrul Arefeen Khan	Mizan	
2020	Gondi (film)	Fakhrul Arefeen Khan		
2021	Mission Extreme	Sunny Sanwar, Faisal Ahmed	Salehin	
2021	August 1975	Selim Khan and Shamim Ahamed Roni	Major Dalim	
2021	Raat Jaga Phool	Mir Sabbir		

=== Television drama ===
Year	Title	Director	Role	Broadcast	Note
2008	House Full (TV series)	Redoan Rony, Iftekhar Ahmed Fahmi	Billal	NTV	
2014	Bhalobasha 101	Redoan Rony			
	Doodle Of Love	Mahmudur Rahman Hime			
	Chakkar				
2017	Satarko Sangket			Channel 24	
2020	Joutho Projejona	Maznun Mizan	Director	Channel I	
2020	Amloki	Maznun Mizan	Director		
	Baker Khani				
	Mehman				

== Extra links ==
- Maznun Mizan at IMDb
