= Meher Afroz Shaon =

Bangladeshi actress, director and architect

- মেহের আফরোজ শাওন
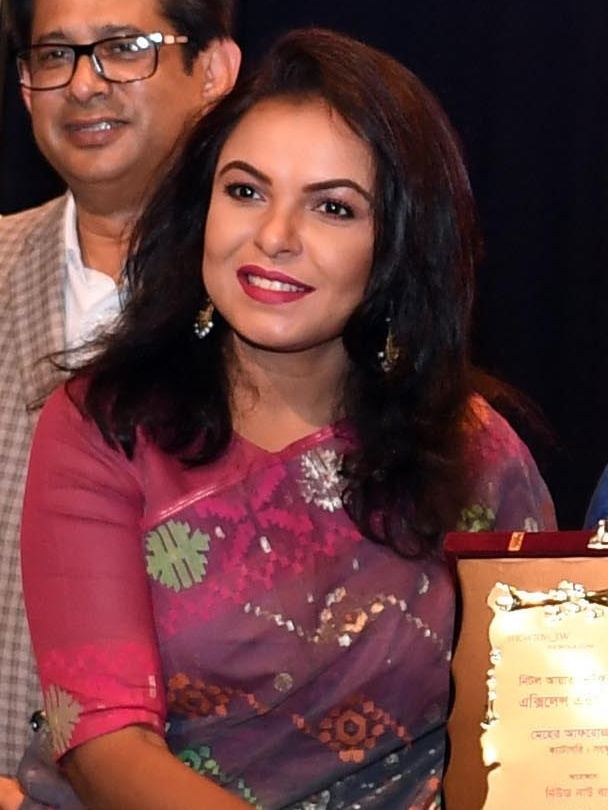
- Shaon in 2020
- Born: 12 October 1981 (age 44); Chittagong District, Bangladesh
- Education: University of Asia Pacific
- Occupations: architect, director, actress, singer, dancer
- Years active: 1988–present
- Spouse: Humayun Ahmed (m. 2004; died 2012)
- Children: 2
- Mother: Tahura Ali

Meher Afroz Shaon (born 12 October 1981) is a Bangladeshi architect, actress, director, dancer and playback singer. She won Bangladesh National Film Award for Best Female Playback Singer for her performance in the film Krishnopokkho (2016). She was the second wife of writer and director Humayun Ahmed.

== Early life ==
Shaon was born to Mohammad Ali, an engineer, and Tahura Ali, who was a member of parliament from Constituency 319 of the 9th Bangladesh Parliament.

Shaon studied at Viqarunnisa Noon School and College. She obtained a SSC and a HSC in 1996 and 1998 respectively. She also studied in BAF Shaheen College Dhaka. She then enrolled at the University of Asia Pacific and received a Bachelor of Architecture degree in 2008. Her country house is in Narundi of Jamalpur district.

== Career ==
Shaon was an enlisted artist of Bangladesh Television (BTV) and began her career acting as a child artist in BTV drama Swadhinota Amar Swadhinota in 1988. She started working with Humayun Ahmed in a drama named Jononee in 1991. She was in drama serial Nokkhotrer Raat in 1996 and Aaj Robibar in 1999. She appeared in Srabon Megher Din directed by Humayun Ahmed the same year.

== Personal life ==
Shaon was married to Humayun Ahmed from 2004 until he died in 2012. She has two sons - Nishad Humayun (born mid 2000s) and Ninith Humayun (born early 2010s).

== Criticism ==
=== Marriage controversy ===
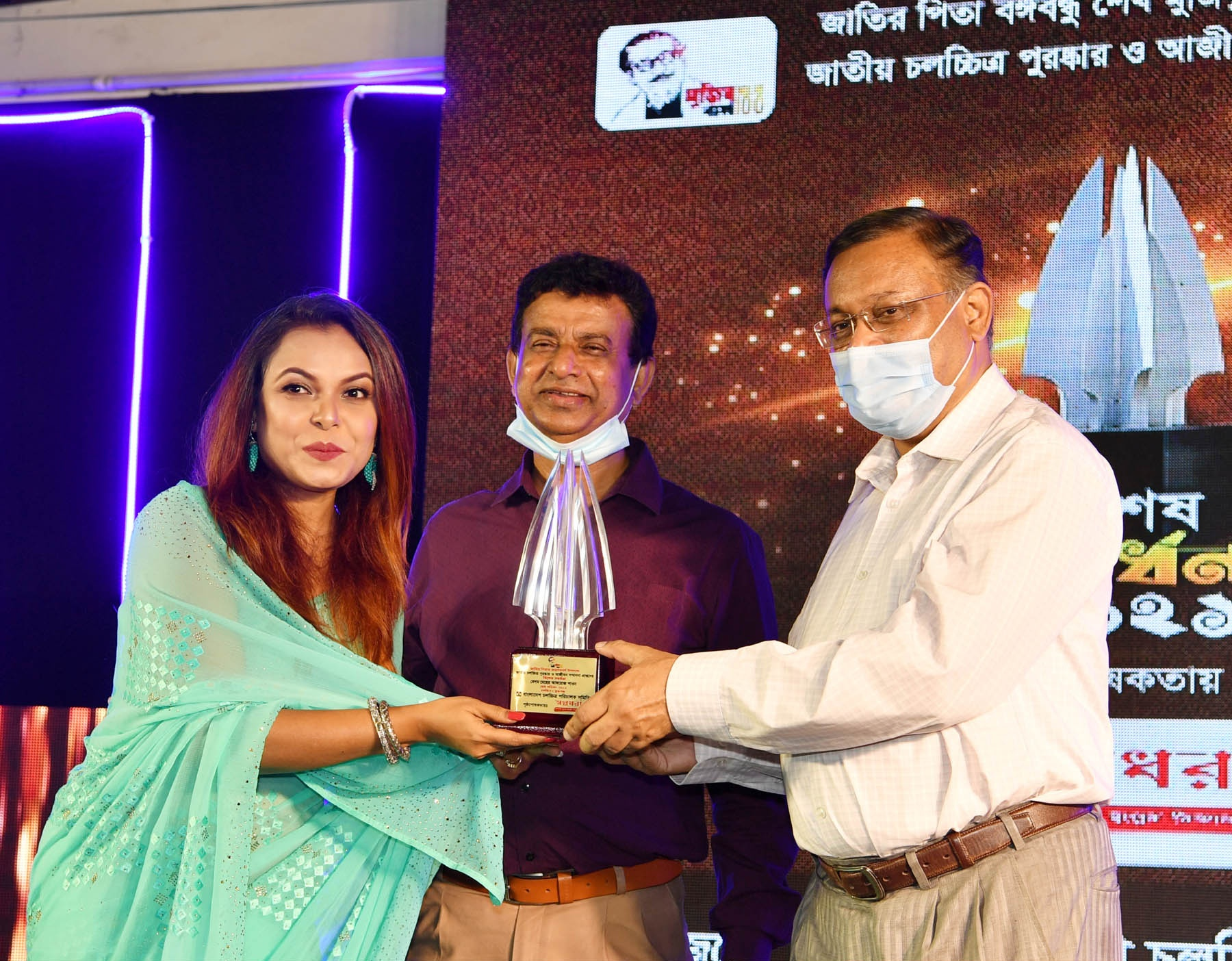
Shaon receives National Film Awards from Hasan Mahmud in 2021.

Shaon married Humayun Ahmed, a famous Bangladeshi writer and film director, and was criticized by Humayun's fans and readers. They blame Shawon for Humayun Ahmed's divorce with his first wife. Some claim that at the instigation of Shawon, Humayun Ahmed divorced his wife Gultekin and married his daughter's friend. Humayun Ahmed's family members were against the marriage. The other side denied this. They claim that everyone has a personal life and everyone should be given that personal freedom.

=== Detained controversy ===
Shaon was detained by the Detective Branch on 6 February 2025, on charges of sedition and alleged anti-state behaviour, but she was later released the next day following interrogation.

In April 2025, a murder case was filed against Shaon and 16 other actors over the death of a protester in Vatara during the Anti-Discrimination Student Movement against the Awami League government led by Prime Minister Sheikh Hasina.

=== Facebook post about the July Uprising and public reaction ===
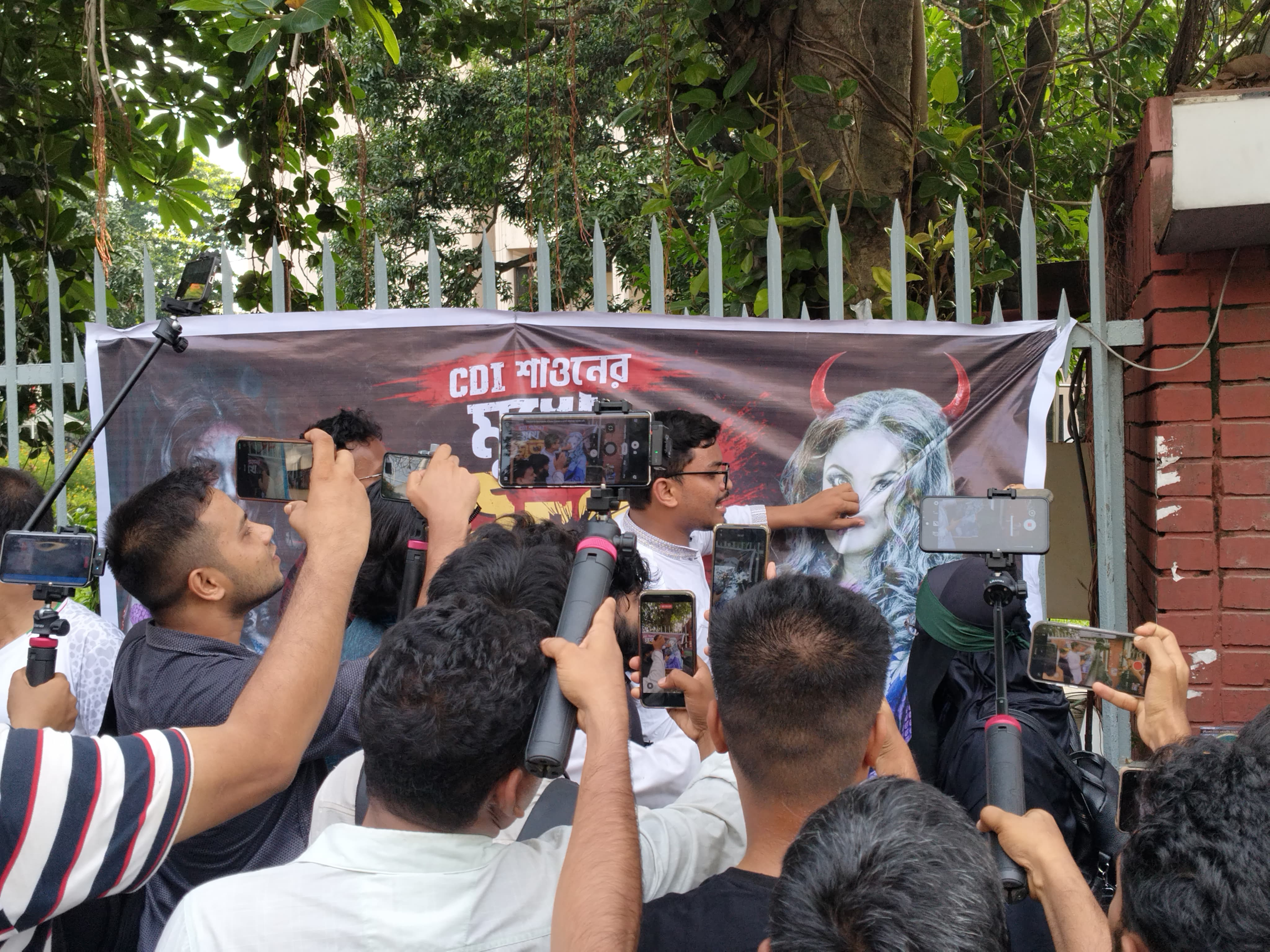
Participants in a protest organised by Manch 24 symbolically throwing shoes at a portrait of Meher Afroz Shaon in Shahbagh, July 2026.

In July 2026, a Facebook post by Meher Afroz Shaon regarding the July Uprising drew widespread discussion and criticism on social media. Following the post, a number of individuals and organisations criticised its content, and the matter was reported by several Bangladeshi news outlets.

Subsequently, the organisation Manch 24 held a protest rally in front of the Bangladesh National Museum in Shahbagh, Dhaka. During the demonstration, participants symbolically threw shoes at a portrait of Shaon in protest against her Facebook post. The event was covered by Bangladeshi news media. Professor Dilara Choudhury condemned Shaon for her comments and expressed her anger saying that "she is not worth being a human being". Dilara Choudhury further made an open request to the government to arrest Meher Afroz Shaon.

== Works ==
=== Filmography ===
Year	Title	Role	Director	Notes and source
1999	Srabon Megher Din	Kusum	Humayun Ahmed	
2001	Dui Duari	Toru	Humayun Ahmed	
2003	Chandrokotha	Chandra	Humayun Ahmed	Won - Meril Prothom Alo Awards Critics Choice Awards for Best Film Actress
2004	Shyamol Chhaya	Ashalata	Humayun Ahmed	
2008	Amar Ache Jol	Nishat	Humayun Ahmed	

=== Television dramas ===
==== Actress ====
Year	Title	Playwright and director	Airdate	Notes and source
1988	Swadhinota Amar Swadhinota		BTV	drama
1989	Shuprobhat Dhaka		BTV	drama
1990	Khowar		BTV	drama
1991	Jononee		BTV	drama
1992	Khadok		BTV	drama
1993	Mohor Ali		BTV	serial drama
1995	Nokkhotrer Raat	Humayun Ahmed	BTV	serial drama
1995	Onyoprishtha		BTV	drama
1997	Sabuj Shathi	Humayun Ahmed	BTV	series drama
1998	Jonok		BTV	drama
1998	Sabuj Chhaya	Humayun Ahmed	BTV	serial drama
1999	Aaj Robibar	Humayun Ahmed and Monir Hossain Jibon	BTV	serial drama
2004	Urey Jay Bok Pokkhi	Humayun Ahmed	NTV	serial drama

==== Director ====
Year	Title	Playwright	Channel	Notes and source
2009	Noya Riksha			TV drama, aired on Eid-Ul-Fitr
2011	Shopno o Shopnobhongo	Humayun Ahmed	Channel i	TV play, aired on Pahela Boishakh
2014	Everest Joy	Chowdhury Khaekuzzaman		Aired on Eid-Ul-Fitr
2014	Osomoye	Chowdhury Khaekuzzaman		Aired on Eid-Ul-Fitr
2014	Bibhrom	Humayun Ahmed	Channel i	TV play, aired on Eid-Ul-Adha
2016	Krishnopokkho	Meher Afroz Shaon		Only feature film as a director

Beside directing several movies, Shaon also began to script some movies. As of March 2018, she was drafting scripts of Gouripur Junction and Nokkhotrer Raat.

==== Television host ====
- Meghe Dhaka Tara on Maasranga Television

== Discography ==
=== Solo ===
- Na Manushi Bone

==== Singles ====
- Ilshe Guri

=== Duet ===
- Je Thake Akhi Pollobe

==== Singles ====
- Juboti Radhey

=== Film scores ===
- Srabon Megher Din
- Dui Duari
- Chandrokotha
- Shyamol Chhaya
- Noy Number Bipod Sanket
- Amar Ache Jol
- Krishnopokkho
- Pita
