= Mahfuz Ahmed =

Bangladeshi television and film actor

- মাহফুজ আহমেদ
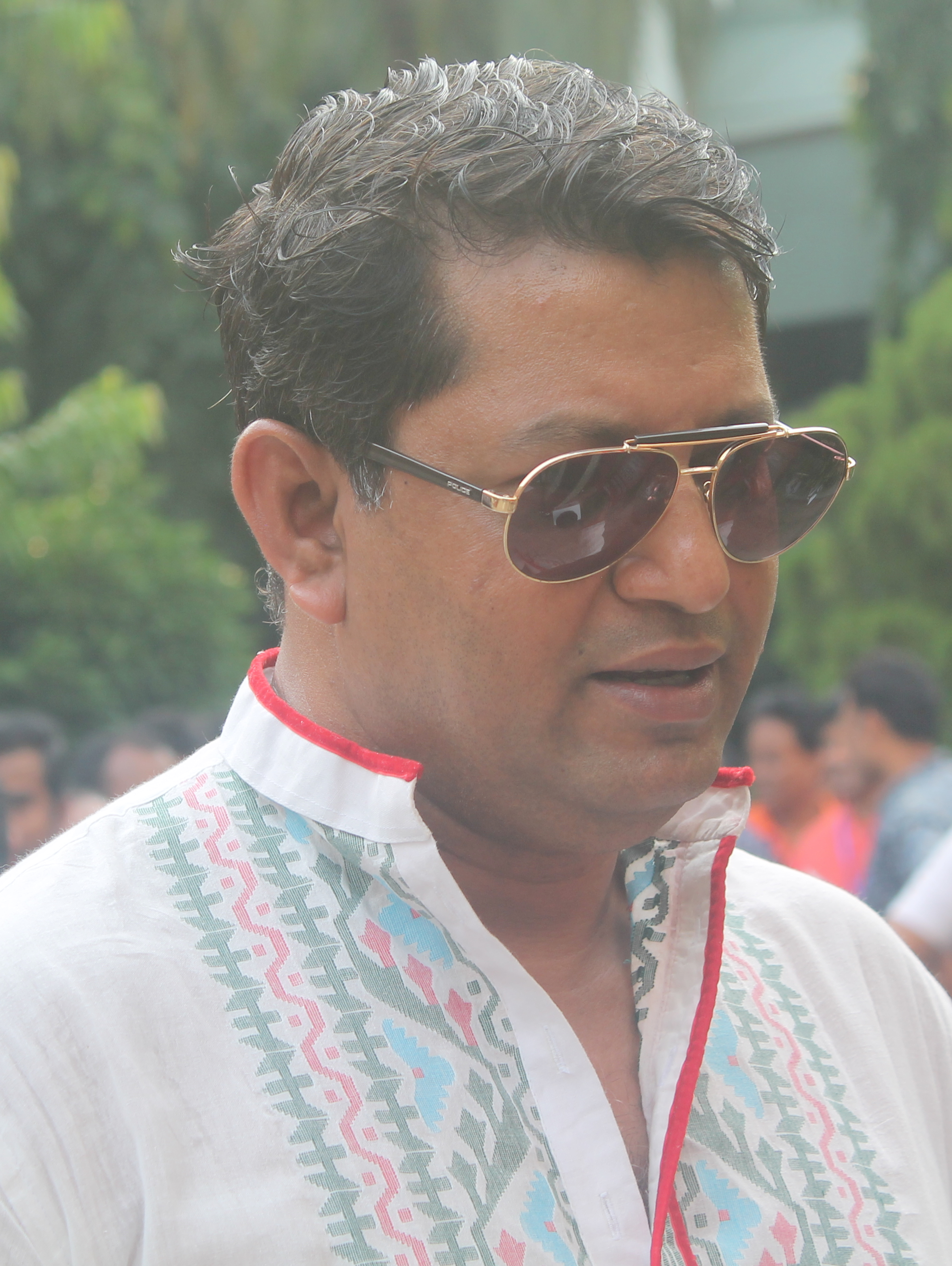
- Ahmed in 2018
- Born: 23 October 1967 (age 58); Ramganj, Lakshmipur
- Education: University of Dhaka
- Occupations: Actor, director, producer
- Years active: 1990–present
- Notable work: Megher Pore Megh, Srabon Megher Din, Joyjatra
- Spouse: Ishrat Jahan Qader (m. 2000)
- Children: 2
- Relatives: GM Quader (father-in-law); Sharifa Quader (mother-in-law)
- Awards: full list

Mahfuz Ahmed (born 23 October 1967) is a Bangladeshi television and film actor. He is also a television presenter, model and television producer. He won Bangladesh National Film Award for Best Actor twice for his roles in Laal Sobuj (2005) and Zero Degree (2015).

== Early life ==
Ahmed was born on 23 October 1967 at Jagatpur village in Ramganj Upazila of Lakshmipur District.

== Career ==
In 1990, Ahmed started his career inspired by Humayun Ahmed. His notable work is Humayun Ahmed's directed films Srabon Megher Din and Dui Duari, Mohammad Hannas's Bhalobashi Tomake, Chashi Nazrul Islam's film Megher Pore Megh and Taukir Ahmed's Joyjatra. He has his own production house named "Nokshikatha". In 2015 he appears in the film Zero Degree.

== Personal life ==
Since 17 November 2000, Ahmed is married to Ishrat Jahan Quader, a daughter of politician GM Quader. She is a senior lecturer at a private university in Bangladesh. Together they have a daughter, Mourin Aradhya Ahmed (b. 2012), and a son, Marvin Ahmed Aritra (b. 2015).

== Filmography ==
Year	Film Title	Role	Note	Ref.
2000	Srabon Megher Din	Suruj	Debut film	
2000	Dui Duari	Shafiq Ahmed		
2004	Megher Pore Megh	Nishan		
2004	Joyjatra	Boidhon		
2005	Lal Sabuj	Sobuj	Winner - Bangladesh National Film Award for Best Actor	
2006	Bangla			
2014	Shabnam	Shuvo		
2015	Zero Degree	Amit		
2023	Prohelika	Mona		

== Television appearances ==
=== Acted TV drama ===
Year	Title	Playwright & Director	Co-stars	Aired on	Note & Source
1989	Kon Kanoner Phool	Imdadul Haq Milon		BTV	
1990	Kothao Keu Nei	Humayun Ahmed; Mohammad Barkatullah	Asaduzzaman Noor	BTV	
1997	Bodh	Chayanika Chowdhury; Fariya Hossain	Shomi Kaiser	BTV	first playwright of Chayanika Chowdhury
	Kobe Hobe Dekha		Ratri		
2003	Digontey Digholi				won Golden Nest Cultural Reporter's Award for Best TV Actor
2003	Ekannoborti				won Golden Nest Cultural Reporter's Award for Best TV serial
2003	Uttor Purush	Tauquir Ahmed (both)			won Golden Nest Cultural Reporter's Award for Best Telefilm Production
2004	Jonok	Aranyo Anwar	Humayun Faridi, Bijori Barkatullah, Ishita, Mir Sabbir	BTV	
2005	Tomake Chhuye		Shomi Kaiser		
2005	Nurul Huda Ekoda Valobeshe Chilo	Aranyo Anwar	Ipshita Shabnam Srabanti, Shahed	BTV	Won Meril Prothom Alo award for the best actor in a drama series
2006	Otopor Nurul Huda	Aranyo Anwar	Tisha, Mir Sabbir	BTV	
2008	Amader Nurul Huda	Aranyo Anwar; Aranyo Anwar & Mahfuz Ahmed	Zahid Hasan, Joya, Ishita, Tisha	ATN Bangla	TV serial
2009	Ekti Purono Golpo	Arif Khan	Raisul Islam Asad, Tarin	Banglavision	telefilm, aired on Eid day
2009	Saat Sagor Tero Nodi		Prova	ntv	telefilm, aired on Eid Day
2009	Bhalobasa	Humayun Ahmed; Mazharul Islam	Shaon, Hasan Masud, Marzook Russel	Channel i	TV play, aired on Eid day
2009	Amar Bou Daroga	Ferdous Hasan	Tarin Ahmed	Channel i	TV play, aired on 2nd day of Eid
2010	Tomar Doway Bhalo Achhi Ma			ATN Bangla	
2011	Choita Pagol	Brindabon Das; Mahfuz Ahmed	Joya Ahsan		
2011	Ekjon Chhayaboti				TV play
2011	Dehorakhhi	Iqbal Hossain Chowdhury	ATM Shamsuzzaman, Bhabna, Mishu		TV play
2013	Beche Thako Sobuj Pata			ATN Bangla	5 episode TV serial,
2013	Mayanigom			ntv	
2013	Sangrila	Tauquir Ahmed; Shahiduzzaman Selim	Zahid Hasan, Joya Ahsan		
2013	Sukhi Manusher Bhire	Al Hajen	Babu, Chanchal, Rumana		
2013	Sorisrip	Iraz Ahmed; Mahfuz Ahmed	Richi Solaiman	Channel 9	telefilm, aired on 3rd day of Eid
2013	Pora Mon	Motia Banu Shukur; Chayanika Chowdhury	Farah Ruma	Maasranga Television	TV play, aired on 4th day of Eid
2013	Dure Jabo Bole	Animesh Aich (both)	Farah Ruma	Channel 9	Single episode TV play
2013	Adharer Oboshan	Maruf Rahman; Mahfuz Ahmed	nipun, Arsha, Rakhi	ntv	telefilm
2014	Mago Tomar Jonno	Prasun Rahman; Mahfuz Ahmed	Babu, Mir Sabbir, Tanvin Swity, Tamalika	ATN Bangla	TV serial, squeal of Tomar Doway Bhalo Achhi Ma
2014	Amader Chhoto Nodi Chole Banke Banke	Mahfuz Ahmed	Babu, Misha Sawdagor, Richi, Sumaiya Shimu	Channel i	TV serial, aired on Saturday and Sunday
2014	Bibha	Rabindranath Tagore; Sumon Anowar	Joya Ahsan	ntv	single episode TV play, adaptation of Tagore's Robibar
2014	Surjaster Aage	Maruf Rehman; Mahfuz Ahmed	Richi Solaiman, Mithila	ntv	
2014	Train Jay Train Ase	Mahfuz Ahmed (both)	Richi, Sporshia	Channel i	aired on Eid
2014	Hello Bangladesh	Mahfuz Ahmed	Richi	Banglavision	aired on Eid
2015	Onumuti Parthona	Chayanika Chowdhury	Shomi Kaiser, Milon, Mithila	NTV	telefilm, shoot in Nepal, aired on Eid-ul-Fitr
2015	Vanity Bag	Ali Fida Akram Tozo	Zahid Hasan, Mahfuz Ahmed, Richi Solaiman, Tariq Anam Khan, Urmila Srabanti Kar, Sazu Khadem, Orchita Sporshia	NTV	aired on Eid
2015	Oikhane Jeyonako Tumi	Badrul Anam Saud; Arif Khan	Purnima	NTV	telefilm, aired on Eid-Ul-Adha

=== Directed TV drama ===
Year	Title	Playwright	Co-stars	Aired on	Note & Source
	Bonolota Sen				
	Goni Saheber Shesh Kichhu Din	Humayun Ahmed (both)	Abul Hayat, Aupee Karim		
	Khela				
	All The Best				
	Bahadur Doctor				
	HOIMONTI	Falguni Hamid.	তনিমা হামিদ		
2008	Amader Nurul Huda	Aranyo Anwar	Zahid Hasan, Joya, Ishita, Tisha	ATN Bangla	TV serial
2010	Tomar Doway Bhalo Achhi Ma			ATN Bangla	
2011	Choita Pagol	Brindabon Das	Joya Ahsan		104 episode TV serial
2013	Sorisrip	Iraz Ahmed	Richi Solaiman	Channel 9	telefilm, aired on 3rd day of Eid
2013	Adharer Oboshan	Maruf Rahman	Mahfuz Ahmed, nipun, Arsha, Rakhi	ntv	telefilm
2013	Buno Chaltar Gaye	Proshun Rahman	Tarin, Monalisa, Babu, Mir Sabbir	ATN Bangla	TV serial, aired every Sunday to Tuesday from September 23, 2013
2014	Mago Tomar Jonno	Prasun Rahman	Babu, Mir Sabbir, Tanvin Swity, Tamalika	ATN Bangla	TV serial, started from January 21, 2014
2014	Amader Chhoto Nodi Chole Banke Banke		Babu, Misha Sawdagor, Richi, Sumaiya Shimu	Channel i	TV serial, aired on Saturday and Sunday
2014	Surjaster Aage	Maruf Rehman	Mahfuz, Richi, Mithila	ntv	aired on Eid
2014	Train Jay Train Ase	Mahfuz Ahmed	Mahfuz, Richi, Sporshia	Channel i	aired on Eid
2014	Sattled Marriage		Babu, Runa Khan, Prasun Azad	ATN Bangla	aired on Eid
2014	Hello Bangladesh		Mahfuz, Richi	Banglavision	aired on Eid

=== TV programs ===
Year	Program	Anchor	Co-stars	Aired on
2014	Humayun Ahmed er Nil Podder Chhoya	Meher Afroz Shaon	Zahid Hasan	Banglavision
2015	Shudui Adda	Farhana Nisho		Boishakhi TV

== Awards and nominations ==
Year	Award Title	Category	Film/Drama	Result
2003	Meril Prothom Alo Awards	Best TV Actor (Popular Choice)		Won
2003	Golden Nest Cultural Reporter's Award	Best TV Actor	Digontey Digholi	Won
2005	National Film Awards	Best Actor	Lal Sabuj	Won
2005	Meril Prothom Alo Awards	Best TV Actor (Popular Choice)		Won
2006	Meril Prothom Alo Awards	Best TV Actor (Popular Choice)	Otopor Nurul Huda	Won
2008	Meril Prothom Alo Awards	Best TV Actor (Popular Choice)	Amader Nurul Huda	Won
2011	Meril Prothom Alo Awards	Best TV Actor (Popular Choice)	Choita Pagol	Nominated
2015	National Film Awards	Best Actor	Zero Degree	Won
