= Tahura Ali =

Bangladeshi politician (1955 or 1956 – 2025)

- তহুরা আলী
- Born: 1955 or 1956
- Died: 23 October 2025 (aged 69); Dhaka, Bangladesh
- Education: University of Chittagong
- Occupation: Politician
- Political party: Bangladesh Awami League
- Spouse: Mohammad Ali
- Children: Meher Afroz Shaon; Maheen Afroz Shinjon

Tahura Ali (1955 or 1956 – 23 October 2025) was a Bangladesh Awami League politician who served as a Member of Parliament.

== Early life ==
Ali completed her master's degree from the University of Chittagong in chemistry in 1987. Ali was the director of finance of Citizen Cables limited. She was also a lecturer at Habibullah Bahar University College.

== Career ==
Ali served in the 9th parliament of Bangladesh and was a Member of Standing Committee on Ministry of Commerce in Parliament. She served in the parliament from 1996 to 2001 and was elected again from Jamalpur for a second term. In 2009, she was selected for a position in the reserved seats for women in Bangladesh parliament.

== Personal life and death ==
Ali was married to Mohammad Ali. Her daughter, Meher Afroz Shaon is an actress. Her son-in-law Humayun Ahmed was a popular novelist and writer.

Tahura Ali died from heart and kidney disease on 23 October 2025, at the age of 69.
