= Aparna Ghosh =

Bangladeshi actress, theater artist and model

- অপর্ণা ঘোষ
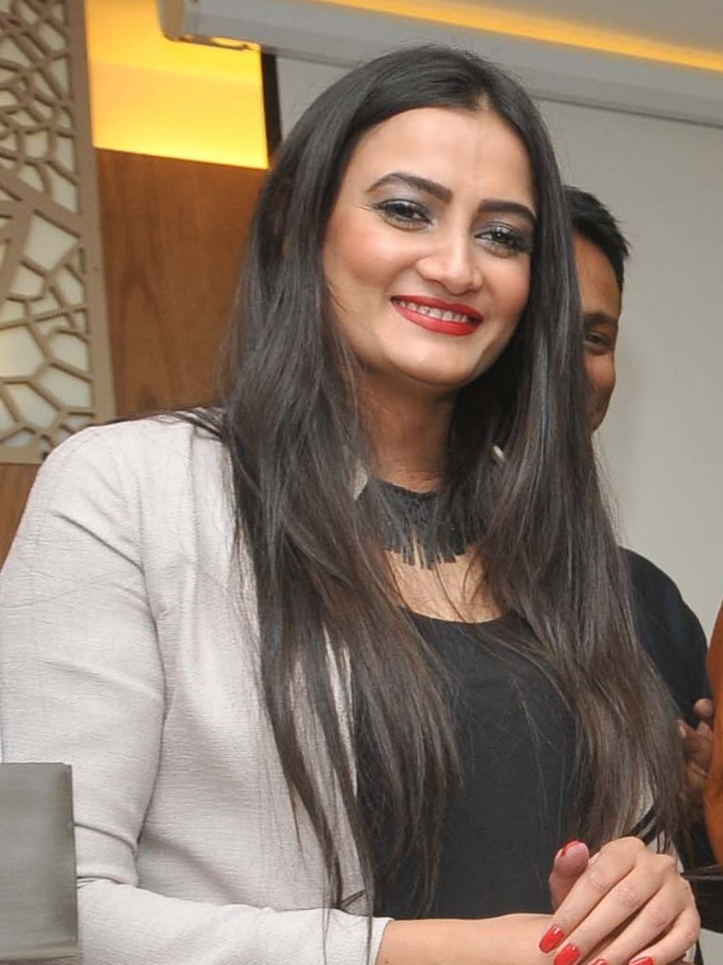
- Ghosh in 2016
- Born: 25 September; Rangamati, Chittagong, Bangladesh
- Occupations: Actress, model
- Spouse: Satrajit Dutta (m. 2020)

Aparna Ghosh (born 25 September) is a Bangladeshi actress, theater artist and model. She won Bangladesh National Film Award for Best Supporting Actress twice for her roles in the films Mrittika Maya (2013) and Gondi (2020).

== Early life ==
Aparna Ghosh was born on September 25 in Rangamati. She spent her early years in both Rangamati and Chittagong. Aparna attended Rangamati Government Girls' High School. Her father, Alok Ghosh, was a stage actor, which inspired her to pursue acting. In 2003, she joined Nandikar, a local theater group in Chittagong, as a stage performer. Her debut performance was in S. M. Solaiman's Court Martial. Aparna later appeared in several stage productions, including William Shakespeare's Othello and The Merchant of Venice, as well as Pap Punya and other plays with Nandikar.

== Career ==
In 2006, Aparna moved to Dhaka, where she became one of the top four contestants in the Lux-Channel i Superstar competition. She made her television debut in the drama Tobu O Bhalobashi.

Ghosh debuted in the film Third Person Singular Number. She is involved with the theater groupe Nandikar since 2003. In 2013, she starred opposite Titas Zia in Mrittika Maya, directed by Gazi Rakayet, portraying the character Fahmida. Her performance earned her the National Film Award for Best Supporting Actress. In 2014, Aparna played the role of Asma in Meghmallar, directed by Zahidur Rahim Anjan. The film, based on Akhtaruzzaman Elias's Liberation War-themed short story "Raincoat," received five awards at the 39th National Film Awards. Her father, Alok Ghosh, is the team leader of Nandikar. In 2015, she starred as the title character in film Sutopar Thikana, playing Sutopa as a teenager, a married woman, a widow, and in old age. The following year, Aparna played the character Bakul in Dorpon Bisorjon, a film based on Jasim Uddin's short story "Ayna." In 2017, Aparna's first release was Bhuban Majhi, a film set during Bangladesh's Liberation War, where she starred as Farida alongside Parambrata Chattopadhyay. in 2022, Gosh played the lead role of Noorjahan in Made in Chittagong.

== Personal life ==
On December 10, 2020, Aparna married Satrajit Dutta, an IT engineer working in Japan, in a ceremony held at her family home in Agrabad, Chittagong. Currently she is living in Japan and working as a school teacher.

== Filmography ==
=== Dramas ===
- Abdul Joliler Bidesh Jatra
- Aj Purobir Din
- Amader Din Ratri
- Amar Nam Manush
- Apon Adhar
- Ashchorjo Ek Sporsho
- Autobiography
- Batighor
- Batiwala
- Bhalobashar Shopnojale
- Bicharok
- Bishu Pagla Gacher Agay
- Blank Page
- Bondhon
- Bou Amar
- Break Up Story
- Careless Mukhless
- Classless Mukhless
- Cross Road
- Dhonnobad
- Faki
- Habildar Hatem
- Harano Oddhay
- His His Who's Who's
- Iche Ghurir Natai
- James
- Je Pakhir Dana Nei
- Jibon Bodol
- Jodi Arektu Shomoy Petam
- Kacher Ashar Golpo 2
- Kaktaruar Deshe
- Kemon Ache Faria
- Krishnokolir Attatag
- Lebur Malaysia Shofor
- Made in Chittagong
- Made in Chittagong A Journey of Love
- Made in Chittagong Super Model
- Maloti
- Megher Arale Rod
- Monowarer Bhromon Birombona
- My Life
- Nagorik Oparajita
- Neon Jochonay Pori
- Nil Megh
- Noshu Villain Ashoka Villain
- Noyon Tara
- Pichutan
- Platform
- Pressure Cooker
- Professor Dablu
- Ratri Diprohor
- Restart
- Rong Tulite Aka Projapoti
- Shadashidhe Manusher Kotha
- Shesh Dui Din
- Shikkha Shofor
- Shomudrer Nil Ratri
- Shondhebelar Upakkhan
- Shurjo Uthar Age
- Sixth Sense
- The Fortune
- Tobu Amare Debona Bhulte
- Tobuo Bhalobasha
- Tomar Amar Golpo
- Tumi Mane Tomar Chole Jawa
- Virtual Labh
- Utshorgo

=== Films ===
Year	Title	Role
2009	Third Person Singular Number	
2015	Sutopar Thikana	Sutopa
2017	Bhuban Majhi	Farida
2022	Made in Chittagong	Noorjahan

== Awards ==
- Anannya Top Ten Awards (2015)
- Bangladesh National Film Award for Best Supporting Actress (2013, 2020)
- Blender's Choice–The Daily Star Awards 2021 for Best Supporting Actor, Series (Female)
