= Zeenat Barkatullah =

Bangladeshi dancer and actress (died 2023)

- জিনাত বরকতুল্লাহ
- Died: 20 September 2023 (aged 72); Dhaka, Bangladesh
- Education: University of Dhaka
- Occupations: Dance artist, choreographer, administrator
- Spouses: Mohammad Barkatullah
- Children: 2, including Bijori Barkatullah
- Awards: Full list

Zeenat Barkatullah (died 20 September 2023) was a Bangladeshi dancer and television actress. She received Bachsas Awards, Bangladesh Cultural Society Lifetime Achievement Award and Natyashabha Award for her contributions to the field of dance.

== Early life and education ==
Mrs Barkatullah was born in Munshiganj (former Bikrampur ) district who was a student of Gazi Alimuddin Mannan at the age of 4. She earned her master's degree in sociology from the University of Dhaka and joined the Performing Arts Academy. She completed a six-year certificate course from Bulbul Lalitakala Academy and later in ballet and dance choreography under experts from North Korea. Her father was the deputy magistrate of Jamalpur District.

== Career ==
Barkatullah worked as one of the directors of Bangladesh Shilpakala Academy beginning in 2002. She acted in around 80 television drama plays. Her acting career began with the drama Maria Amar Maria in 1980. She later acted in Ghore Baire, Osthai Nibas, Boro Bari, and Kotha Bola Moyna, among others.

Barkatullah was one of the advisors of Bangladesh Nrityo Shilpi Songstha, Nrityanchal and Bangabandhu Shishu Kishor Mela.

On 22 January 2022, Barkatullah was awarded the Ekushey Padak, the second most important award for civilians in Bangladesh.

== Personal life and death ==
Barkatullah had two daughters, including actress Bijori Barkatullah and Kajori Barkatullah.

Zeenat Barkatullah died on 20 September 2023.

== Awards ==
- Sher-e-Bangla Memorial Award (1985)
- Natya Shabha Award (1987)
- Cadet Core Award (1989)
- UNESCO Award (1996)
- Tarokalok Award (1997)
- Millennium Award (2000)
- Amritabazar Award (2001)
- Bangladesh Shilpakala Academy Award (2008)
