= Gondi (film) =

2020 film by Fakhrul Arefeen Khan

- Movie poster
- Bengali: গণ্ডি
- Directed by: Fakhrul Arefeen Khan
- Written by: Fakhrul Arefeen Khan
- Based on: Pother Sathi by Suvojit Roy
- Produced by: Fakhrul Arefeen Khan & Israt Sultana
- Starring: Sabyasachi Chakrabarty; Suborna Mustafa; Maznun Mizan; Aparna Ghosh; Aman Reza
- Cinematography: Rana Dasgupta
- Edited by: Prokash Golam Mustafa
- Music by: Debojyoti Mishra and Deep-Loy
- Production company: Gorai Films
- Distributed by: Gorai Films (Bangladesh)
- Release date: 8 February 2020
- Running time: 112 minutes
- Country: Bangladesh
- Language: Bengali

Gondi (Bengali: গণ্ডি, lit. 'The Boundary') is a 2020 Bangladeshi romantic comedy-drama film. The film was directed by Fakhrul Arefeen Khan and produced by Gorai Films. It stars Sabyasachi Chakrabarty and Suborna Mustafa, with Shuvashish Bhowmik, Majnun Mijan, Aparna Ghosh, Aman Reza, and Payel Mukherjee in supporting roles.

== Plot ==
A 60-year-old retired government official and widower, Mr. Azgar Ali, lives alone with his driver and working people in an elite area of Dhaka. His only son, Ali Mizan, lives in London with his family. After two years, Ali Mizan comes home to see his father. Azgar Ali is suffering from dementia and memory loss. His daily routine is gardening on the roof, watching stars at night, walking in the park in the morning, and talking on Skype with his granddaughter Arha in London.

Due to his poor memory, Azgar Ali makes many mistakes every day. One such mistake is to transfer rupees 5 lakh to Mrs. Shamima's account by mistake. Mrs. Shamima, who is in her 50s and also lonely, is a dentist by profession and is the neighbor of Azgar Ali. Her only daughter lives in London with her husband, Jason. Azgar Ali and Mrs. Shamima get acquainted after the accidental money transfer, and they become friends. Azgar Ali's doctor advises the two to go to Cox's Bazar. Azgar Ali's son and his daughter-in-law Millie and Mrs. Shamima's daughter learn about their outing. Within three days, the son, daughter-in-law, and daughter of Shamima arrive from London. The emotional battle of parents and children starts with Azgar Ali and Mrs. Shamima.

== Cast ==
- Sabyasachi Chakrabarty
- Suborna Mustafa
- Shuvashish Bhowmik
- Maznun Mizan
- Aparna Ghosh
- Aman Reza
- Payel Mukherjee
- Mugdhota Morshed (child artist)

== Production ==
The film was produced by Gorai Films. Gondi was filmed in various locations, including London, England, and with the Bangladesh Film Development Corporation in Uttara, Gulshan, Dhaka, Bangladesh.
