= Gazi Alimuddin Mannan =

- গাজী আলিমুদ্দিন মান্নান
- Born: 1930; Comilla, Bengal Presidency, British India
- Died: 1 March 1990 (aged 59–60)
- Other name: Manish Kumar
- Occupation: Dancer

About Gazi Alimuddin Mannan

Gazi Alimuddin Mannan was born on June 8, 1930 in Satkola village of Cumilla. His contribution to the dance world of Bangladesh is outstanding. As a result of his keen interest in dance, he left the country and moved to Mumbai on the invitation of Shantibardhan to learn dance. There he joined the Little Ballet as a student. After completing his education, he also taught there for some time. He then moved to China in 1955 where he trained in acrobatic dance, lighting and stage design. He returned to the country and joined Bulbul Lalitkala Academy in 1958. In 1963 he established his own dance institute named 'Nikkan Lalitkala Academy'. Besides, he worked efficiently as the dance director of National Performing Arts in 1979 and Bangladesh Shilpakala Academy in 1983.

In 1961, Gazi Alimuddin Mannan gave an unforgettable dance form to one of the works of the first poet Jasimuddin "Nakshi Kanthar Maath".

On that day, the lights of the hall of the Institute of Engineers lit up. There was silence all over the hall. The fainting streak of the tune has not been cut yet. Pallikabi Jasimuddin is sitting in front of the audience. His imagination has taken the form of a banyan tree. The black curtain of the stage moved. One by one all the crew came on stage including Rupai-Saju. Immediately, the silence of the hall was broken by the applause. The poet got on the dais, hugged Rupai and blessed her. Gazi Alimuddin Mannan aka G A Mannan was in the role of Rupai of Nakshi Kantha field that day. Under his guidance and direction, the Nakshikantha field dance has given rise to a form of storytelling that no one has seen before. Nakshi Kanthar Maath is a type of ballad i.e., a pure melodic and rhythmic form of folk song. And Bengali folk poem Nakshi Kantha was staged by G. A. Mannan in the form of western ballet (western dance drama), mixing elements of Bengali folk culture.

The music of Nakshi Kanthar Math dance-drama is directed by Ustad Khadem Khan. Patua Kamrul Hasan gave the art direction.

Other notable dances created by him are Nakshi Kanthar Maath, Khudhit Pashan, Mahua, Kashmiri, Odhik Khabar Falao, Hajar Tarer Bina, Alibaba Challish Chor, Nabanna etc. G A Mannan died on March 1, 1992.

== Early life and career ==
Mannan got his dance training in Bombay under Shantibardhan. In Bombay, he adopted the stage name Manish Kumar. He returned to Dhaka in the 1950s and joined Bulbul Lalitakala Academy in Dhaka and created some dances including peacock dance, spring dance, fishermen's dance, harvest dance, Santal dance and tea-garden dance. Later he established a new forum called Nikkon Lalitkala Academy. He also worked as the dance director of the Bangladesh Performing Arts Academy and Bangladesh Shilpakala Academy.

Zeenat Barkatullah was one of Mannan's students.
