= Subir Nandi =

Bangladeshi musician (1953–2019)

Subir Nandi সুবীর নন্দী
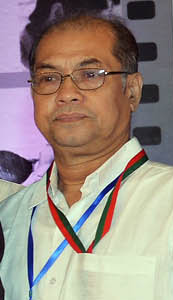

Background information
- Born: 19 November 1953; Baniachong, East Bengal, Pakistan (presently in Habiganj district, Bangladesh)
- Died: 7 May 2019 (aged 65) Singapore
- Instrument: Vocal
- Years active: 1970s—2019
- Spouse: Purabi Nandi

Subir Nandi (19 November 1953 – 7 May 2019) was a Bangladeshi musician. He won Bangladesh National Film Award for Best Male Playback Singer five times for his performance in the films Mahanayak (1984), Shuvoda (1986), Srabon Megher Din (1999), Megher Pore Megh (2004) and Mohua Sundori (2015). He was awarded Ekushey Padak in 2019 by the government of Bangladesh.

== Early life ==
Nandi was born in a Bengali Kayastha family of Nandi Para, Baniachong, Habiganj District in present-day Bangladesh. He spent his childhood in Teliapara Tea Estate, Habiganj. His father was a doctor (Medical Corps of The British Army) and medical officer at Teliapara Tea Estate. Nandi has eight siblings. All nine of them learnt music from Ustad Babar Ali Khan. He grew up listening to Pankaj Mullick, Kundan Lal Saigal, Sandhya Mukhopadhyay, and Manna Dey.

== Career ==
Nandi's musical career started in the 1970s. His work in the film Mahanayak (1984) got him the breakthrough and also his first national film award. He went on singing songs like Shrabon Megher Din and Megher Opare Megh. In an interview with BTV he claimed that he had sung already 2000 film songs setting the record of second highest number of songs sung by any male singer only after Andrew Kishore.

In 1972, Nandi recorded his first song, Jodi Keu Dhup Jele Deye, written by Mohammed Muzakker and composed by Ustad Mir Kasem. In 1979, he sang Din Jaye Kotha Thake from a film with the same title. The lyrics were written by Khan Ataur Rahman.

Nandi learnt folk music from Bidit Lal Das, a folk singer. Nandi became a member of a musical band named Bidit Lal Das and His Team, founded in 1972. Other members included Akramul Islam, Jamaluddin Banna, Rakhal Chakrabarty, Himangshu Goswami and Himangshu Biswas.

In 1994, Nandi rendered songs at the House of Commons of the United Kingdom.

== Personal life ==
Subir Nandi married to Purabi Nandi in 1981. Having a daughter, named Falguni Nandi. He died in Singapore on 7 May 2019.

== Awards ==
- Bangladesh National Film Award for Best Male Playback Singer; 1984, 1986, 1999, 2004, 2015
- Citibank Lifetime Achievement award; 2012
- Bangladesh Film Journalist Association awards; 1977, 1982, 1985 and 1986
- Ekushey Padak for music; 2019

== Discography ==
Studio albums

- Dukher Pore Shukh
- Prem Bole Kichu Nei
- Valobasha Kokhono Morena
- Surer Bhubone
- Ganer Sure Amay Pabe 2015

Films

- Devdas (1982)
- Mahanayak (1984)
- Simana Periye (1985)
- Ammajan (1999)
- Srabon Megher Din (1999)
- Chandrokotha (2004)
- Megher Opare Megh (2004)
- Shudha (2004)
- Shasti (2006)

Songs

- Amar E Duti Chokh
- Ekta Chilo Sonar Konya
- Bha-lobashi Shokaley
- Tomare Chharite Bondhu
- Tumi Emoni Jaal Pe-techho Shongshare
- Ami Brishtir Kachh Theke
- Koto Je Tomake Beshechhi Bhalo
- Chandey Kolongko Achhey Jemon
- Keno Bha-lobasha Hariye Jaye
- O Amar Ural Pongkhirey
- Bondhu Hote Cheye
- Bondhu Tor Borat Niya
- Paharer Kanna Dekhe
- Hajar Moner Kachhe

== Film songs ==
Year	Film	Song	Composer(s)	Songwriter(s)	Co-artist(s)	
1976	Setu	"Koto Rongo Jaano Re Bondhu"	Satya Saha	Gazi Mazharul Anwar	chorus	
1976	Surjogrohon	N/A	Raja Shyam	Gazi Mazharul Anwar	N/A	
1977	Trishna	"Na Na Parbona Re"	Satya Saha	Gazi Mazharul Anwar	Abida Sultana	
1978	Abhiman	"Amar Praan Kande"			Sabina Yasmin	
1978	Ashikkhito	"Master Saheb Ami Naam Dostokhot"	Satya Saha	Gazi Mazharul Anwar	solo	
1978	Maa	"Ami Pothe Pothe Ghuri"	Satya Saha	Zia Haider	solo	
1978	Maa	"Prem Piriti Chai Bole"	Satya Saha	Ahmed Zaman Chowdhury	solo	
1979	Bela Shesher Gaan	"Bondhu Dimuna Jaite"	Khandaker Nurul Alam	Gazi Mazharul Anwar	Shammi Akter	
1979	Matir Ghor	"Amar Naoye Par Hoite"	Satya Saha	Gazi Mazharul Anwar	Shammi Akter	
1980	Amir Fokir	"Mon Dilam, Pran Dila"	Ali Hossain	Masud Karim	Runa Laila	
1980	Chutir Ghonta	"Rohmot Miya, Tomay Naam Dostokhot Shekhate Chai"	Satya Saha	Gazi Mazharul Anwar	Sabina Yasmin	
1980	Shesh Uttar	N/A	Robin Ghosh	Ahmed Zaman Chowdhury	solo	
1981	Bhalo Manush	"Kache Eso Aaro Kachhe"	Subal Das	Masud Karim	Runa Laila	
1981	Angshidar	"Tomari Poroshe"	Satya Saha	Gazi Mazharul Anwar	Sabina Yasmin	
1981	Angshidar	"Mama Bhaigna Jekhane"	Satya Saha	Gazi Mazharul Anwar	Khurshid Alam	
1981	Sakkhi	"Amra Duti Chhele Meye"	Alauddin Ali		Runa Laila	
1982	Devdas	"Sukhero Bashor	Khandaker Nurul Alam	Mohammad Rafiquzzaman	Sabina Yasmin	
1982	Kajol Lota	"Ei Raat Dake"	Ahmed Imtiaz Bulbul		Shammi Akter	
1984	Chandranath	"Mayar Badhon Chhere Chole Jaay"	Khandaker Nurul Alam	Mohammed Rafiquzzaman	solo	
1984	Mahanayak	"Tumi Chao Priya Nodi Hoye"	Sheikh Sadi Khan	Nazrul Islam Babu	Haimanti Shukla	
1984	Mahanayak	"Amar E Duti Chokh"	Sheikh Sadi Khan	Jahidul Haque	solo	
1984	Mahanayak	"Prithibite Prem Bole Kichhu Nei"	Sheikh Sadi Khan	Masud Karim	solo	
1985	Rai Binodini	"Na Puraiyo Radhar Ongo"	Alauddin Ali	Amjad Hossain	Sabina Yasmin	
1985	Rai Binodini	"Ki Je Kori Bol, Ore O Subol"	Alauddin Ali	Amjad Hossain	solo	
1985	Shubho Ratri	"Kono Priyo Chhobi, Amar Hridoy"	Satya Saha	Mohammad Rafiquzzaman	Sabina Yasmin	
1986	Porosh Pathor	"Tumi Amay Adhar Theke"	Khan Ataur Rahman		Sabina Yasmin	
1987	Rajlakshmi Srikanta	"Laglam Na Karo Pujate"	Alauddin Ali	Abu Hena Mostofa Kamal	Abida Sultana	
1987	Shuvoda	"Abujh Nodir Dui Kinar"	Khandaker Nurul Alam	Mohammed Rafiquzzaman	solo	
1987	Shuvoda	"Tumi Emoni Jaal Petechho"	Khandaker Nurul Alam	Mohammed Rafiquzzaman	solo	
1987	Sondhi	"Jhilmil Jhilmil Korchhe Raat"	Satya Saha	Gazi Mazharul Anwar	solo	
1987	Sondhi	"Ekta Chithi Likhe Dao"	Satya Saha	Gazi Mazharul Anwar	solo	Sabina Yasmin
1988	Alibaba Chollish Chor	"Adom O Hawa, Swargo Chhariya"	Subal Das	Ahmed Zaman Chowdhury	Runa Laila	
1988	Kanchanmala	"Tumi Faruk Amar"	Satya Saha	Shah Sikandar Azad	Runa Laila	
1989	Nawab Sirajuddaula	"Ekul Bhange, Okul Gore, Eito Nodir Khela"	Amir Ali	Khan Ataur Rahman, Gazi Mazharul Anwar, Masud Karim	solo	
1989	Nawab Sirajuddaula	"Ekul Bhange, Okul Gore" (reprise)	Amir Ali	Khan Ataur Rahman, Gazi Mazharul Anwar, Masud Karim	solo	
1989	Ram Rahim John	"Jiboner Golpo Eto Chhoto Noy"	Satya Saha	Gazi Mazharul Anwar	solo	
1989	Ranga Bhabi	"Amar Ja Kichu" (part 1)	Subal Das	Gazi Mazharul Anwar, Ahmed Zaman Chowdhury	Sabina Yasmin	
1989	Ranga Bhabi	"Amar Ja Kichu" (part 2)	Subal Das	Gazi Mazharul Anwar, Ahmed Zaman Chowdhury	Sabina Yasmin	
1989	Shorto	"Tumi Kedona"	Alauddin Ali	Gazi Mazharul Anwar	solo	
1990	Karon	"Tumi Eto Sundor"	Alauddin Ali	Masud Karim	solo	
1990	Karon	"Ami Jibon Pothe Tomar"	Alauddin Ali	Masud Karim	solo	
1990	Kusum Koli	"Ei Deho Hoilo"	Monsur Ali	Moniruzzaman Monir	Sabina Yasmin	
1991	Padma Meghna Jamuna	"Tumi Amar Bondhu"	Khandaker Nurul Alam	Mohammad Rafiquzzaman, Nazrul Islam Babu	Shammi Akter	
1992	Amar Adalot	"Tomar Premer Agune Puri"	N/A	N/A	Sabina Yasmin	
1995	Ei Ghor Ei Songsar	"Narir Karone"	Alam Khan	Mohammad Rafiquzzaman	solo	
1996	Mayer Adhikar	"Palkite Choraiya"	Ahmed Imtiaz Bulbul, Moniruzzaman Monir	Ahmed Imtiaz Bulbul	Shakila Zafar	
1997	Abdullah	"Ki Kore Bolbo Tomay"	Abu Taher	Moniruzzaman Monir	solo	
1998	Anek Diner Asha	"Ore Maa Re, Khokhono Tui Jas Na Re"	Ahmed Imtiaz Bulbul	Ahmed Imtiaz Bulbul	Andrew Kishore, Kanak Chapa, Shakila Zafar, Khalid Hasan Milu, Shuvro Dev	
1998	Anek Diner Asha	"Baper Moto Baap Hole, Emon Chhele Hoy"	Ahmed Imtiaz Bulbul	Ahmed Imtiaz Bulbul	Shakila Zafar	
1998	Anek Diner Asha	"Tore Niya Shopno Joto" (part 1)	Ahmed Imtiaz Bulbul	Ahmed Imtiaz Bulbul	solo	
1998	Anek Diner Asha	"Tore Niya Shopno Joto" (part 2)	Ahmed Imtiaz Bulbul	Ahmed Imtiaz Bulbul	solo	
1998	Anek Diner Asha	"Tore Niya Shopno Joto" (part 3)	Ahmed Imtiaz Bulbul	Ahmed Imtiaz Bulbul	solo	
1999	Paharadar	"Aay Ghum Aay"	N/A	N/A	solo	
1999	Srabon Megher Din	"Ekta Chilo Sonar Konya"	Maksud Jamil Mintu	Humayun Ahmed	solo	
2001	Churiwala	"Kon Deshete Thakore"	Satya Saha	Gazi Mazharul Anwar	Abida Sultana	
2003	Chondrokotha	"AO Amar Ural Ponkhi Re"	Maksud Jamil Mintu	Humayun Ahmed	solo	
2005	Chhotto Ektu Bhalobasha	"O Priyo Bondhure"	Devendranath Chattopadhyay	Kabir Bakul	Kanak Chapa	
2005	Dui Noyoner Alo	"Bodhuare Bujhona Keu Bhul"	Ahmed Imtiaz Bulbul		solo	
2005	Hajar Bochor Dhore	"Asha Chilo Mone Mone"	Ahmed Imtiaz Bulbul	Zahir Raihan	solo	
2005	Hajar Bochor Dhore	"Tumi Sutoy Bedhechho"	Ahmed Imtiaz Bulbul	Gazi Mazharul Anwar	Anupama Mukti	
2005	Meher Nigar	"Eso Sundoro He"	Ahmed Imtiaz Bulbul, Emon Saha	Kazi Nazrul Islam	Sabina Yasmin	
2006	Dajjal Shashuri	"Amar Maa Hara Duita Maiya"	Emon Saha	N/A	Kanak Chapa	
2008	Chandragrohon	"Aayre Sokhi Biron Kori"	Emon Saha	Mohammed Rafiquzzaman, Kabir Bakul	solo	
2015	Mohua Sundori	"Kothay Chhilam Kothay Ailam"			solo	
2018	Pagol Manush	"Ei Sundor Prithibite"	Imtiaz Ahmed	Ahmed Imtiaz Bulbul	solo	
N/A	N/A	"Nachoto Dekhi Tumi"	N/A	N/A	Sabina Yasmin	
N/A	N/A	"Jotodin Bachbo Tomay Bhalobashbo"	N/A	N/A	Sabina Yasmin	
N/A	N/A	"Jiboner Kono Songrame"	N/A	N/A	Sabina Yasmin	
N/A	N/A	"Ami Hajaar Bochhor Bachte Chai"	Golam Hossain Ladu	N/A	Sabina Yasmin	
N/A	Bashor Ghor	"Aajke Khushir Rong Legechhe"	N/A	N/A	Sabina Yasmin	
N/A	Lal Golap	"Pakhire Tui Dure Thakle"	Amir Ali	Khan Ataur Rahman	solo	
N/A	Papi Sontan	"Aaj Nijhum Raat Amar Phool Shojya"	N/A	N/A	solo	
N/A	Usila	"Ore Phool Debo, Bichha Debo"	Ali Hossain	Nazrul Islam Babu	Abida Sultana	
N/A	Usila	"Koto Je Tomake, Besechhi Bhalo"	Ali Hossain	Nazrul Islam Babu	solo	
