= Kothao Keu Nei =

Popular Bangladeshi Drama (1990s)

- The opening title card of the television series
- কোথাও কেউ নেই
- Genre: Drama
- Based on: Kothao Keu Nei by Humayun Ahmed
- Written by: Rahat Ahmed
- Directed by: Barkatullah
- Starring: Cast
- Theme music composer: Maksud Jamil Mintu
- Opening theme: Maksud Jamil Mintu
- Composer: Maksud Jamil Mintu
- Country of origin: Bangladesh
- Original language: Bengali
- No. of seasons: 1
- No. of episodes: 30

Production
- Producer: Barkatullah
- Cinematography: Anwar Hossain Bulu; Abdul Halim; Sameer Kushari; S.A.M. Saeed
- Editor: Mosharraf Hossain
- Running time: 20-22 minute

Original release
- Network: Bangladesh Television
- Release: 1992 – 1993

Kothao Keu Nei (Bengali: কোথাও কেউ নেই, English: No one is anywhere) is a Bangladeshi drama television series written by Humayun Ahmed and directed by Mohammad Barkatullah, which aired on Bangladesh Television from 1992 to 1993. The series centers on the life and struggles of a gangster named Baker Bhai, portrayed by Asaduzzaman Noor, and his love interest Muna, played by Suborna Mustafa. It was adapted from the book of the same name. The series also stars Abdul Kader as Bodi and Lutfur Rahman George as Mojnu.

Kothao Keu Nei gained intense popularity, mainly due to the lovable rogue Baker Bhai, who grew into one of the most beloved fictional characters in Bangladesh's television history. The series is often regarded as one of the best Bangladeshi television dramas and a house staple of every Bangladeshi in the 90s cable-tv era. It is also considered one of the finest works of Humayun Ahmed till date.

== Plot ==
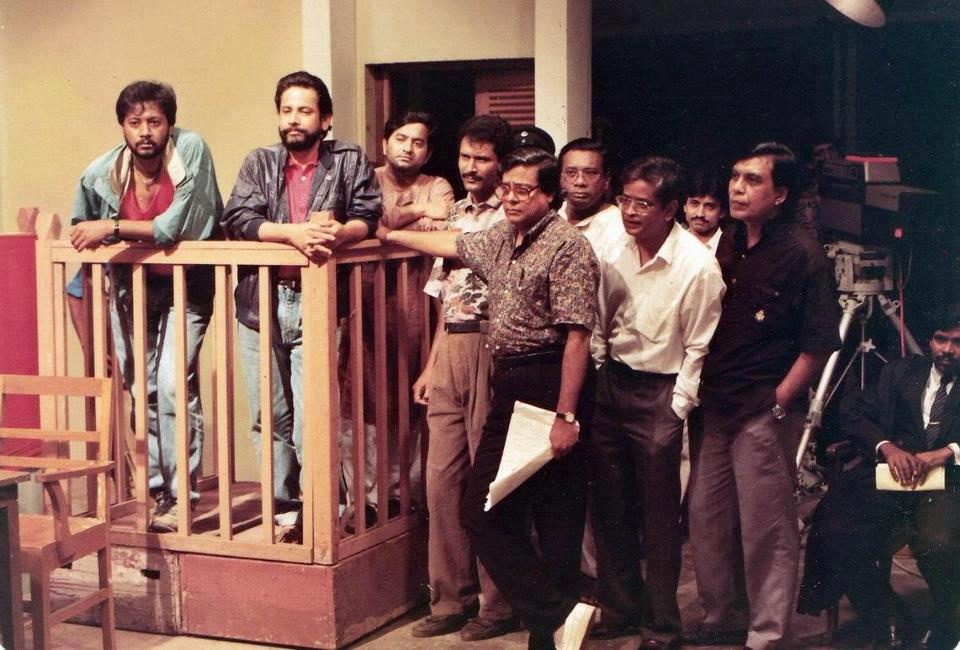
The set of the popular drama "Kothao Keu Nei" on BTV during the 1990s. It was written by Humayun Ahmed, and the lead role of "Baker Bhai" (second from left) was played by Asaduzzaman Noor.

The central character of the series was "Baker Bhai". He was a gangster, and his companions were "Badi" and "Majnu"; the three of them travelled on motorcycles. Most of the time, Majnu drove the motorcycle, Badi sat at the back, and Baker Bhai sat in the middle. Baker Bhai had a habit of repeatedly twisting a chain around his index finger, turning it over, unfastening it, and fastening it again. He was often seen doing this when there was no dialogue.

Baker Bhai was fond of 'Muna', a girl from a lower-middle-class family. She worked and looked after her cousins, and she was in a relationship with an unemployed young man named Mamun. Although Baker Bhai was the local gangster, most people loved him because he stood for justice. He never hesitated to support oppressed people, and rather than tolerating social injustice, he confronted it with the help of his associates.

As the story progresses, Baker Bhai comes into conflict with an influential woman in the area named Rebecca Haque. She was involved in illegal activities within her house, and Baker Bhai protested after discovering them. He called her 'Kuttawali' because she kept dogs in her house. Meanwhile, Rebecca Haque's gatekeeper was murdered at his house in the dead of night. Baker Bhai was blamed for the murder, and Moti, a newly emerged robber in the area and a witness arranged by Rebecca Haque, testified against him.

Although Baker Bhai's lawyer attempted to expose Moti's false testimony in court, Rebecca Haque managed to manipulate Baker Bhai's associate Badi by tempting him with greed and persuading him to implicate Baker Bhai. Desperate and conflicted, Badi ultimately gave false testimony in court against him. Based on this false testimony, the court sentenced Baker Bhai, who was innocent of the murder, to death. His lawyer fought for him until the very end but failed. Muna was devastated by the court's decision.

Meanwhile, everyone in Muna's household moved away to different places. One solitary morning, in the semi-darkness before dawn, the police carried Baker Bhai's body through the prison gates as the Fajr call to prayer echoed all around. There was no one there to receive the body except Muna. After the cremation, Muna was left completely alone, as though she no longer had anyone in the world. Living up to the play's title, Muna stands alone in the wilderness in the series's final scene, with the light of dawn appearing only as a faint shadow in the darkness.

== Cultural impact ==
After the unjustified death of the protagonist, protests broke out everywhere; fans brought demonstrations.

Letters and petitions urged Ahmed not to kill off Baker Bhai. Notably, the erstwhile Prime Minister of Bangladesh Khaleda Zia made a phone call to Ahmed and requested him to change the ending. But Ahmed stuck to his storyline, and Baker Bhai was hanged. For years afterward, special prayers were held in many localities to pray for the departed soul of this fictional character.

Ahmed was quite perturbed by this public agitation over Baker Bhai's hanging.

''So many people are hanged for no good reason, so many people die by the roadside and there is hardly any public headache over these. Yet, here was a fictional character being hanged and the public are up in arms. I was quite taken aback by all this," Humayun Ahmed told the BBC.

== Cast ==
- Asaduzzaman Noor as Baker Bhai
- Abdul Kader as Bodi
- Lutfur Rahman George as Mojnu
- Suborna Mustafa as Muna
- Mozammel Hossain as Shawkat
- Lucky Enam as Latifa
- Afsana Mimi as Bokul
- Shila Ahmed as Lina
- Titu as Babu
- Masud Ali Khan as Muna's grandfather
- Shahiduzzaman Selim as Bokul's husband
- Nazma Anwar as Bokul's mother-in-law
- Mahfuz Ahmed as Moti
- Khairul Alam Sabuj as Mamun
- Bijori Barkatullah as Ira
- Shamsuzzaman Khan Benu as Baker's Brother
- Rubina as Baker's Sister-in-Law
- Masuda Sharfuddin as Rebecca
- Selina Mahbub Trishna as Ruma
- Hosne Ara Putul as Jhuma
- Tamalika Karmakar as Shuma
- Saleh Ahmed as Chan Miah
- Humayun Faridi as the lawyer of Baker Bhai and Shawkat
- Abul Khair as the lawyer of Rebecca
- Nazmul Huda Bachchu as a colleague of Muna
