= Suja Khondokar =

Bangladeshi actor (1941–1997)

- সুজা খন্দকার
- Born: 28 January 1941; Pabna District, Bengal, British India
- Died: 2 March 1997 (aged 56); Dhaka, Bangladesh
- Citizenship: Bangladesh
- Education: University of Dhaka
- Occupation: Actor

Suja Khondokar (or Suja Khandakar) (28 January 1941 – 2 March 1997) was a Bangladeshi actor. Throughout his career, he worked in cinema, theatre, radio, television, and advertisements. Among his dramatic contributions were the compelling stage play Muntasir Fantasy and the television series Shongshoptok, Eishob Dinratri, and Aaj Robibar. His cinematic journey commenced in 1972 with Ora Egaro Jon, the production that holds the distinction of being Bangladesh's inaugural film centered on the Liberation War. Audiences particularly cherished him for his innate ability to deliver effortless performances in humorous roles, which garnered widespread affection. Beyond his artistic endeavors, his name is linked with the nascent stages of Bangladesh's air transport sector. Notably, he and Mina Chowdhury served as the flight attendants aboard the inaugural commercial flight of Biman Bangladesh Airlines on 4 February 1972.

== Early life and education ==
Suja Khondokar was born on 28 January 1941, into a Bengali Muslim family in the Pabna District, which was then part of the Bengal Province in British India. He earned a master's degree in Bengali language and literature from the University of Dhaka.

== Career ==
Khondokar was an actor active across multiple mediums, including stage, radio, television, and film. He was affiliated with Dhaka Theatre, where he notably portrayed the character of Muntasir in their production of Muntasir Fantasy. On television, he achieved recognition for his portrayals of humorous characters. 'Sadek Ali' stands as one of his well-known dramatic roles.

His television credits include a number of popular series such as Songshoptok, Eishob Dinratri, Dure Kothao, Mohor Ali, Tension, Rupnagar, and Aaj Robibar. In addition to his work in dramas and films, he also featured in commercial advertisements. The dialogue "Jhak-e Jhak-e Jatka / Current Jal-e Atka" (trans. Baby Hilsa in Schools / Trapped in Current Nets) from a public service announcement concerning hilsa conservation became one of his widely recognized utterances.

His cinematic journey commenced in 1972, marked by portrayal of a Pakistani soldier in Ora Egaro Jon. Spanning several decades, his extensive filmography encompasses a diverse collection of notable works, including Paye Cholar Poth, Dena Paona, Sadhu Shoytan, Sujon Sokhi, Sareng Bou, Taser Ghor, Sokhi Tumi Kar, Sukher Shongshar, Ekhoni Shomoy, Pension, Tinkonna, Shaheb, Lalu Shardar, Bikkhobh, Tomake Chai, Denmohor, Mayer Odhikar, Priyo Tumi, and Shesh Shonggram.

== Death ==
He died in Dhaka on 2 March 1997.
