= Shila Ahmed =

Bangladeshi actress

- শীলা আহমেদ
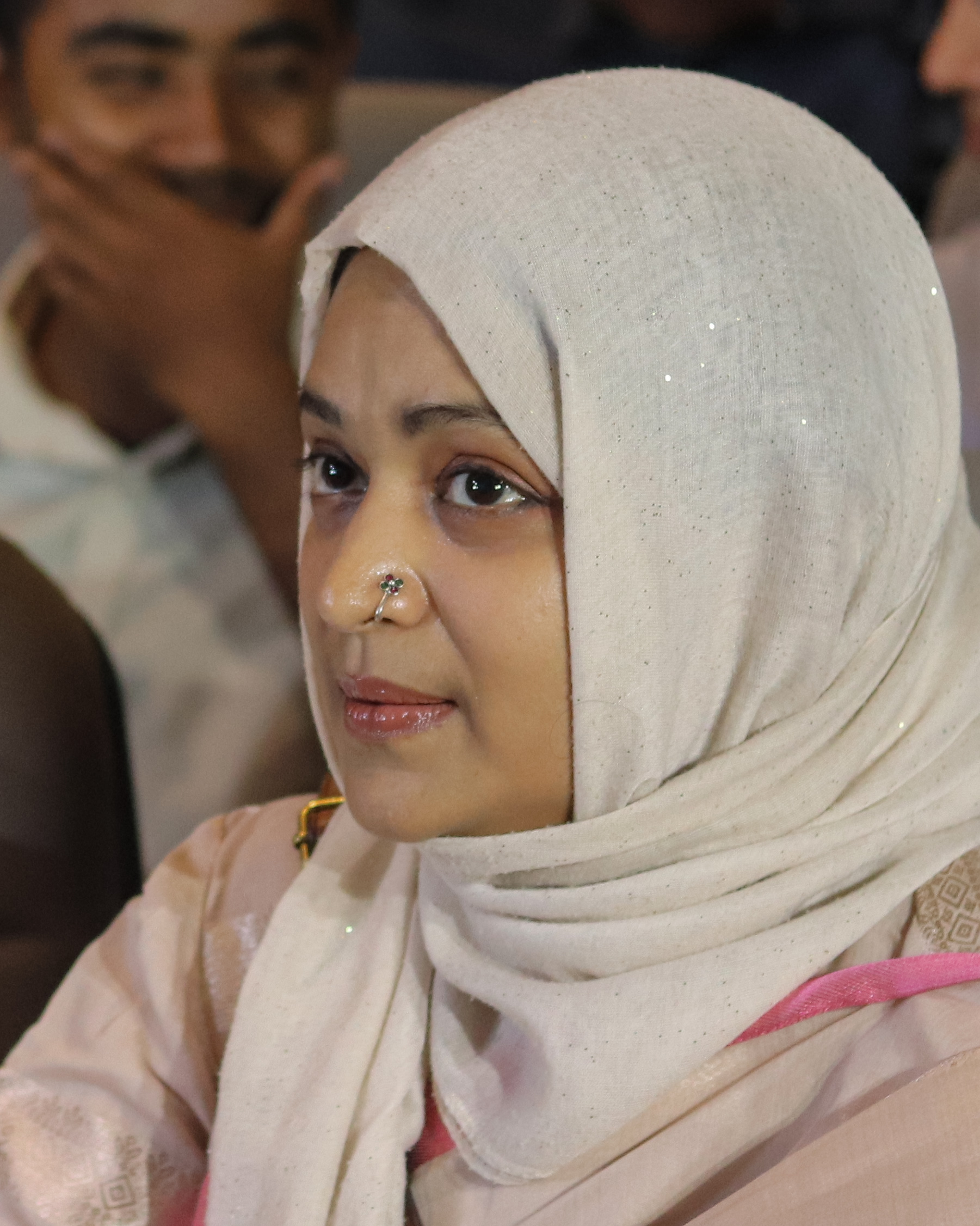
- Ahmed in 2025
- Occupation: Actress
- Spouse: Asif Nazrul (m. 2013)
- Parents: Humayun Ahmed (father); Gultekin Khan (mother)
- Relatives: Mohammed Zafar Iqbal (paternal uncle); Ahsan Habib (paternal uncle)
- Family: Nuhash Humayun (brother)

Shila Ahmed (Bengali: শিলা আহমেদ) is a former Bangladeshi television and film actress. She won Bangladesh National Film Award for Best Child Artist Award for her performance in Aguner Poroshmoni (1994).

== Early life and career ==
Ahmed was born to writer Humayun Ahmed and Gultekin Khan.

Ahmed was involved in acting in television from her childhood. She is notable for her role in television dramas such as Kothao Keu Nei, Aaj Robibar and Nokkhotrer Raat.

== Personal life ==
Shila married her friend Apu and had two children. Later, they were divorced and she married Asif Nazrul, a professor of Department of Law at the University of Dhaka in 2013. They have a daughter together.

== Works ==
Television

| Year | TV Series/TV film | Role | Comment |
|---|---|---|---|
| 1993-1994 | Kothao Keu Nei | Child artist (Lina) | |
| 1992 | Priyo Podorekha | Child artist (Bilu) | |
| 1995 | Oija Board | Child artist (Nila) | |
| 1995 | Neem Ful | Child artist | |
| 1997 | Nokkhotrer Raat | Child artist (Polin) | |
| 1999 | Aaj Robibar | Teenager (Konka) | |
| 2002 | Kuabnagar | Teenager (Khuab Konya) | |

Films

| Year | TV Series/TV film | Role | Comment |
|---|---|---|---|
| 1994 | Aguner Poroshmoni | Child artist (Apala) | |
