= Kazi Bashir =

Bangladeshi cinematographer and make-up artist

- কাজী বশির
- Occupation: Cinematographer
- Years active: 1980–1995
- Notable work: Ghrina; Asha Bhalobasha
- Awards: National Film Awards (1st times)

Kazi Bashir is a Bangladeshi Cinematographer and Make-Up artist. He won the Bangladesh National Film Award for Best Cinematography for the film Ghrina (1994).

== Selected films ==
- Protiggya - 1980
- Badhon Hara - 1981
- Naat Bou - 1982
- Boro Bhalo Lok Chhilo - 1982
- Griho Bibad - 1986
- Dhoni Gareeb -1987
- Khotipuron - 1989
- Khoma - 1992
- Tumi Amar - 1994
- Ghrina - 1994
- Asha Bhalobasha - 1995

== Awards and nominations ==
National Film Awards

| Year | Award | Category | Film | Result |
|---|---|---|---|---|
| 1994 | National Film Award | Best Cinematography | Ghrina | Won |
