= Maksud Jamil Mintu =

Bangladeshi film music composer and director

Maqsud Jamil Mintoo
- মিন্টু
- Occupation: Musician

Maqsud Jamil Mintoo is a Bangladeshi music composer and director. He won the Bangladesh National Film Award for Best Music Director for the song "Ekta Chilo Sonar Konya" in the film Srabon Megher Din (1999).

== Early life and career ==
Mintoo was a student of West end high school and graduated from Shahid Sohrawardi college.

Mintoo first played guitar in 1979. In 1982, he began working in film playback songs with Ahmed Imtiaz Bulbul. He played the guitar for the background score for the film Megh Bijli Badol.

Mintoo first worked as a music director in the film Agun Jalo, directed by Motin Rahman. The film featured the song "Elomelo Batashe", rendered by singer Baby Naznin. He worked as composer and music director in several films by Humayun Ahmed. In 1986 Mintoo released an audio album for Shaikh Ishtiak named Nondita. In 1987 he released an audio album for Baby Naznin. In 2009, Mintoo released an audio album for Subir Nandi titled Shonar Konya. Mintoo composed station ID music for Bangladesh Television, NTV, Channel 9. Mintoo debuted theme-music composition for the television dramas with "Jekhane Dekhibe Chhai" in 1988. He went on to compose for more than 5000 dramas including Gronthik-gon Kohe by Selim Al Deen, Shirsho Bindu by Abdullah Al Mamun and Kothao Keu Nei by Mohammad Barkatullah. He worked as an honorable jury board member for national film award 2021and 2023

== Works ==
Films Scores

- 1995: Agun jole
- 1999: Srabon Megher Din
- 2001: Dui Duari
- 2003: Chandrakotha
- 2004: Shyamol Chhaya
- 2012: Ghetu Putro Komola

Songs:

- Nilanjona (Sheikh Ishtiak)
- Josna rate(Sheikh Ishtiak)
- Ekdin Ghum Venge (Sheikh Ishtiak)
- Elomelo Batashe (Baby Naznin)
- Oi Rangdhu (Baby Naznin)
- Poreche Lal Shari (Baby Naznin)
- Ekta Chilo Sonar Konya (Subir Nandi)
- O Amar Ural Ponkhi Re (Subir Nandi)
- Ami onek Bathar Srabon (Tapan Chowdhury)
- Chadni poshore (Selim Chowdhury)
- Amar Vanga ghore (Sabina Yasmin)
- Boroshar prothom dine (Sabina Yasmin)
- Sajano Holona Kicku (Tapan Chowdhury)
- Kono Ek Shondhai (Shuvro Dev)

Television dramas

- 1993: Kothao Keu Nei
- 1988: Jekhane Dekhibe Chhai
- 1999: Aaj Robibar
- 2005: Khanda Chitra
- 2005: Neerey Tar Neel Dheu
- 2007: Tulite Aka Swapno
- 2008: Mem Saheb

Albums

- 1986: Nondita
- 1987: Potro Mita
- 2009: Shonar Konya
- 2016: Abar Dujone
