= Srabon Megher Din =

Srabon Megher Din শ্রাবণ মেঘের দিন
- Srabon Megher Din Movie Poster
- Directed by: Humayun Ahmed
- Written by: Humayun Ahmed
- Produced by: Nuhash Films
- Starring: Zahid Hasan; Mahfuz Ahmed; Sayeem Afran; Meher Afroz Shaon; Anwara; Golam Mustafa; Abul Khair; Saleh Ahmed; Dr. Ejajul Islam; Shamima Nazneen; Mukti
- Cinematography: Mahfuzur Rahman Khan
- Edited by: Atiqur Rahman Mollik
- Music by: Maksud Jamil Mintu
- Distributed by: Nuhash Films
- Release date: 1999
- Running time: 150 minutes
- Country: Bangladesh
- Language: Bengali

Srabon Megher Din (Bengali: শ্রাবণ মেঘের দিন, English: A Day of the Month Srabon) is a 1999 Bangladeshi drama film based on the novel of Humayun Ahmed. This film is based on a tragic triangle love-story set in a classical village of Bangladesh directed by the writer himself. This was the second film directed by Humayun Ahmed and it won National Film Award. British Film Institute enlisted this film in the Top 10 Bangladeshi Film (Critics) as a 2002 cultural project on South Asian cinema in 2002.

== Plot ==
Moti (Zahid Hasan) is a folk singer in a village. A girl, Kusum (Meher Afroz Shaon), from that village falls in love with him, even though she tries to hide it. The story takes a turn when Suruj Miah (Mahfuz Ahmed) came in, brought by Kusum's father (Saleh Ahmed) to marry Kusum. But tragedy hits in the end. Film elements include love, conflict, sorrow, and tragedy.

== Cast ==
- Abul Khair – tea stall
- Golam Mustafa – zamindar
- Saleh Ahmed – Kusum's father
- Zahid Hasan – Moti (Gatok/Gayok)
- Meher Afroz Shaon – Kusum
- Mahfuz Ahmed – Suruj Miah
- Dr.Ejajul Islam – Poran
- Shamima Nazneen – Durga (Poran's wife)
- Anwara – Kusum's mother
- Mukti – Shahana
- Rawshan Jamil – Ramiz's Mother

== Soundtrack ==
Srabon Megher Din

Soundtrack album by Maksud Jamil Mintu
- Released: 1999
- Recorded: 1999
- Genre: Feature film soundtrack
- Label: Sangeeta
- Producer: Nuhash Chalachitra

Maksud Jamil Mintu chronology
Agun Jole (1995)	Srabon Megher Din (1999)	Dui Duari (2000)

This movie was highly acclaimed for its beautiful music. The music of this film was directed by Maksud Jamil Mintu and lyrics were penned by Rashid Uddin, Wakil Munshi, and Humayun Ahmed. Subir Nandi, Sabina Yasmin, Bari Siddiqui and other popular singers sang in this film. Bari Siddiqui became popular through this film.

All music is directed by Maksud Jamil Mintu.

Track	Singer(s)	Lyrics
Pubali Batase	Bari Siddiqui	Rashid Uddin, Wakil Munshi, and Humayun Ahmed
Amar Gaye Joto Dukkho Soy	Bari Siddiqui	Rashid Uddin, Wakil Munshi, and Humayun Ahmed
Manush Dhoro Manush Vojo	Bari Siddiqui	Rashid Uddin
Ekta Chilo Sonar Konya	Subir Nandi	Humayun Ahmed
Kail Amrar Kusum Ranir Bibah Hoibo	Aklima Begum	Humayun Ahmed
Amar Bhanga Ghore	Meher Afroz Shaon & Sabina Yasmin	Humayun Ahmed
Sua Chan Pakhi	Bari Siddiqui	Rashid Uddin, Wakil Munshi, and Humayun Ahmed
O Bhabijan!	Bari Siddiqui	Folk

== Awards ==
Award Title	Category	Awardee	Result
National Film Awards	Best Actor	Zahid Hasan	Won
National Film Awards	Best Actor in a Supporting Role	Golam Mustafa	Won
National Film Awards	Best Music Director	Maksud Jamil Mintu	Won
National Film Awards	Best Lyrics	Rashid Udiin	Won
National Film Awards	Best Male Playback Singer	Subir Nandi	Won
National Film Awards	Best Sound Recording	Mofizul Haque	Won
Bachsas Awards	Best Actor	Zahid Hasan	Won
Bachsas Awards	Best Music Director	Maksud Jamil Mintu	Won
Bachsas Awards	Best Lyrics	Humayun Ahmed	Won
Bachsas Awards	Best Male Playback Singer	Bari Siddiqui	Won
Bachsas Awards	Best Story	Humayun Ahmed	Won
Bachsas Awards	Best Screenplay	Mahfuzur Rahman Khan	Won
Bachsas Awards	Best Art Direction	Dhrubo Esh	Won
Bachsas Awards	Best Sound Recording	Mofizul Haque	Won

== See also ==
- Aguner Poroshmoni
- Dui Duari
- Ghetuputra Komola
