= Kazi Harun =

Bangladeshi make-up artist

- কাজী হারুন
- Occupation: Make-up artist
- Awards: National Film Award for Best Make-up Artist (1994)

Kazi Harun is a Bangladeshi make-up artist. He won National Film Award for Best Make-up Artist for working in Hridoy Theke Hridoy in 1994. He worked in over 100 films.

== Biography ==
Harun made his debut in Dhallywood with Milon in 1965. Later, he worked in films like Beder Meye Josna, Anya Jibon, Hridoy Theke Hridoy, Shangkhamala, Golapi Ekhom Dhakay, Jibon Sangsar and more. He was conferred National Film Award for Best Make-up Artist for working in Hridoy Theke Hridoy.

Harun suffered a stroke in 2009. He had to sell his gold medal that he received as his recognition as National Film Award for Best Make-up Artist in 2010 for his daughter's marriage expenses. He had to start begging in 2011. He was granted BDT 5,00,000 on 14 September 2019 from Bangladeshi Prime Minister Sheikh Hasina for his medical expenses.

== Selected filmography ==
- Beder Meye Josna
- Anya Jibon
- Hridoy Theke Hridoy
- Shangkhamala
- Golapi Ekhom Dhakay
- Jibon Sangsar

== Awards and nominations ==
Year	Award	Category	Work	Result
1994	National Film Award	Best Make-up Artist	Hridoy Theke Hridoy	Won
