= Bari Siddiqui =

Bangladeshi singer-songwriter (1954–2017)

Bari Siddiqui বারী সিদ্দিকী
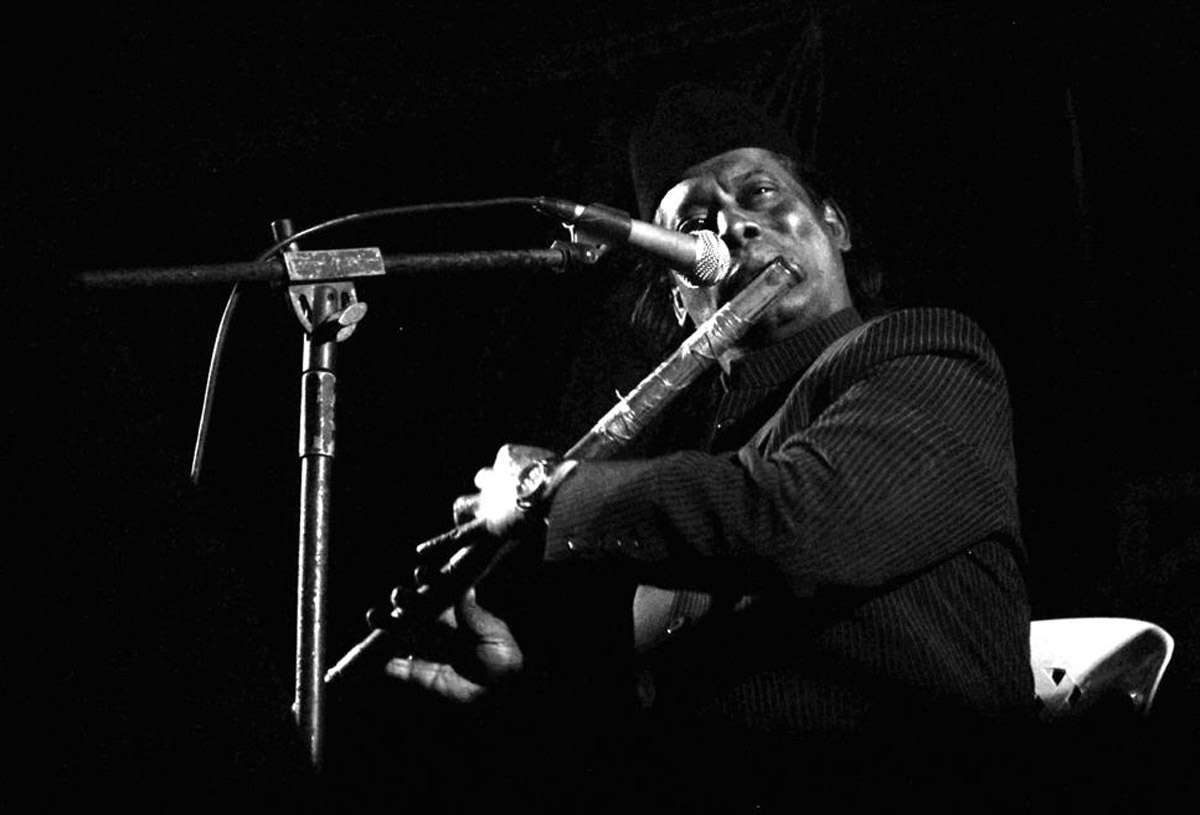
- Siddiqui at a concert in SUST campus (2012)

Background information
- Born: Abdul Bari Siddiqui; 15 November 1954; Barhatta, Netrokona, East Bengal, Dominion of Pakistan
- Died: 24 November 2017 (aged 63) Dhaka, Bangladesh
- Genres: Folk, classical
- Occupation: Singer
- Instrument: Flute
- Years active: 1981–2017

Bari Siddiqui (15 November 1954 – 24 November 2017) was a Bangladeshi singer-songwriter and flautist. His songs include Shua Chan Pakhi, Amar Gaye Joto Dukkho Shoy, Pubali Batashe and Manush Dhoro Manush Bhojo.

== Early life ==
Popularly known as Bari Siddiqui, Abdul Bari Siddiqui was born on 15 November 1954, in Barhatta, Netrokona, [Bangladesh]. At the age of 12, he received formal vocal training from Gopal Dutt of Netrokona. Starting in 1981, Bari took lessons for six years under Ustad Aminur Rahman. He later received professional tutelage from V. G. Karnaad in Pune, India.

Siddiqui completed intermediate studies at Netrokona Govt College and earned a bachelor's degree from the University of Dhaka. He joined Bangladesh Television around 1985.

== Career ==
Siddiqui made his first appearance on television in 1995 on Ronger Baroi, a musical program produced by Humayun Ahmed, who is considered to be one of his patrons. He came into the mainstream media with the release of Humayun Ahmed's film Srabon Megher Din (1999). Siddiqui won a Bachsas Award for the Best Male Playback Singer for his song "Shua Chan Pakhi" in the movie Srabon Megher Din.

Bari has performed in countries like India, Pakistan, Singapore, Indonesia, Thailand, Burma, the United States, England, Switzerland, France and many other European countries. In 1999 at the World Flute Conference in Geneva, where representatives from seventy countries took part, Bari Siddiqui was the only representative from the Indian subcontinent. He received many awards for his performances: the Fajar Music Festival award in Iran, the World Flute Conference Award in Geneva, the International Film Movement Association Award, and the Bachshash Award. His songs mainly featured pain, love, human life, and existence. Siddiqui voiced around 160 tracks during his career and released a folk album titled Lokhkho Tara in April 2000. Some of his albums are Matir Deho, Mone Boro Jala, and Matir Malikana. Siddiqui also appeared in the films Rupkothar Golpo and Stories of Change.

In 2013, Siddiqui also appeared in the drama Pagla Ghora, directed by Amol Palekar, to extend his artistic expression.

== Personal life ==
Bari Siddiqui was married to Farida Easmin, and together, they had three children - sons Sabbir and Bilash and daughter Elma.

== Death and legacy ==
Siddiqui was admitted to Square Hospital in Dhaka on 17 November 2017 with heart disease and died on 24 November 2017.

To continue the Baul tradition in music, Siddiqui established a Baul music research centre named "Baul Bari," near his home village in Netrokona, Bangladesh.
