= Hosne Ara Putul =

Bangladeshi actress and model

- Other names: Putul
- Occupations: Actress, model
- Years active: 1990-Present

Hosne Ara Putul (Bengali: হোসনে আরা পুতুল; also spelled as Hosneara Putul) is a Bangladeshi actress and model. Putul is the recipient of several accolades, including National Film Awards in 1994.

== Career ==
In 2004 she appeared in the film Shyamol Chhaya, which was Bangladesh's submission to the 78th Academy Awards in the 'Foreign Language Film' category. Beginning in 2014, she appeared in the film Jonakir Aalo, which was selected as the Bangladeshi entry for the Best Foreign Language Film at the 87th Academy Awards, but was not nominated.

== Filmography ==
Year	Film	Role	Notes
1994	Aguner Poroshmoni	Binti, The housemaid	
2004	Shyamol Chhaya	Putul	
2004	Rupkothar Golpo	Mother in fertility clinic	Guest Appearance as Hosne Ara Putul
2008	Amar Ache Jol	Local Villager's wife	as Putul
2014	Jonakir Aalo		

=== Television series ===
- Kothao Keu Nei (1990)
- Grihosukh Private Limited (1998)
- Vober Hat (2006) as Khushboo
- 14 Inch-e Shada Kalo Rongin Television

== Awards ==
Year	Film	Award	Category	Result
1994	Aguner Poroshmoni	National Film Awards	Special Award: Child	Won
