= Salman Mohammad Muqtadir =

Bangladeshi YouTuber and actor

Salman Muqtadir
- Born: Salman Mohammad Muqtadir; 9 August 1993 (age 33)
- Occupations: YouTuber; actor; musician; author
- Years active: 2012–present
- Spouse: Disha Islam (m. 2023)

Instagram information
- Page: salmon_tbf
- Years active: 2012–present
- Followers: 1.8 million

YouTube information
- Channel: SalmoN TheBrownFish
- Years active: 2012–present
- Genres: Comedy; Music
- Subscribers: 1.69 million
- Views: 167 million
- Last updated: 30 September 2026

Salman Mohammad Muqtadir (born 9 August 1993), commonly known as Salman Muqtadir, is a Bangladeshi YouTuber, actor, musician, and author. He began posting videos on YouTube in 2012 through his channel SalmoN TheBrownFish, which was among the early Bangladeshi YouTube channels. He has also worked in television, music, advertising, and business.

== Early life ==
Muqtadir completed his higher secondary education in 2012 and later travelled to Australia to study accounting. He returned to Bangladesh and began making videos after discontinuing his studies.

== Career ==
=== YouTube ===
Muqtadir launched his YouTube channel, SalmoN TheBrownFish, in 2012. His early videos included music and comedy, and he later produced comedy sketches and satire about everyday social behavior.

=== Acting, music, and business ===
Muqtadir has worked in television, music, and advertising, including the 2022 drama Struggle. He launched the clothing brand GetGoosebumps in 2018 and relaunched it in 2020. In 2023, he worked with PizzaBurg as a brand ambassador and later as its marketing head. In April 2026, he co-founded BrownFish Studio, a video and commercial production studio.

==== Music video controversy ====
In 2019, Muqtadir released the music video Obhodro Prem. The video attracted criticism and led to his questioning by the Detective Branch of the Bangladesh Police. Muqtadir said he had contacted police to clarify rules concerning YouTube content and that the video had been made primarily for an Indian audience. The video was later unavailable on YouTube.

==== 2026 studio vandalism ====
On 26 September 2026, Muqtadir's BrownFish Studio at ECB Chattar in Dhaka was reportedly vandalized during an attack on the Newgini Properties project where it was located. Muqtadir attributed the incident to an extortion dispute and accused the BNP, while police said it resulted from a land dispute and that the studio was not the target. Thirteen people were named in the case, and three were sent to jail on 27 September.

=== Activism ===
Muqtadir publicly supported the 2018 road-safety protests and the July Uprising. In September 2024, he was named as one of the 55 members of the Jatiya Nagorik Committee, a platform formed following the July Uprising.

== Personal life ==
Muqtadir announced his marriage to Disha Islam on 2 May 2023. The couple had married on 30 April.

== Bibliography ==
- Behind the Sin (2020)
