= Noy Number Bipod Sanket =

- Theatrical release poster
- নয় নম্বর বিপদ সংকেত
- Directed by: Humayun Ahmed
- Written by: Humayun Ahmed
- Screenplay by: Humayun Ahmed
- Story by: Humayun Ahmed
- Produced by: Ebne Hasan Khan, Faridur Reza Sagar
- Starring: Rahmat Ali; Challenger; Jayanta Chattopadhyay; Shadhin Khosru; Rupok Talukder; Tania Ahmed; Shabnam Parvin; Maznun Mizan; Diti; Taniya Sultana Munni; Choity
- Cinematography: Mostafa Kamal
- Release date: July 6, 2007 (Bangladesh)
- Country: Bangladesh
- Language: Bengali

Noy Number Bipod Sanket (English: Danger Signal Number Nine) is a 2007 Bangladeshi Bengali comedy-drama film directed by Humayun Ahmed. The film stars Rahmat Ali, Challenger, Jayanta Chattopadhyay, Shadhin Khosru, Tania Ahmed, Rupok Talukder, Shabnam Parvin, Maznun Mizan and Diti in lead roles. The film was shot in Nuhash Polli.

== Plot ==
Mr. Shobhan (Rahmat Ali) is an unhappy father, whose two daughters and a son live away from him. So busy are they in their lives that they hardly visit their father. So Mr. Shobhan hits a plan and lies to his daughters and son about his death and tricks them to come to his mansion. When they come, they find out that it was just a trick to bring them. So, the family reunites. But everybody was frightened and surprised at Mr. Shobhan. Then suddenly a girl called Ranjana (Tania Ahmed) comes. No one knows by who she was invited. But she makes everyone happy except the two sisters. They are jealous of Ranjana as their husbands are talking to her, dancing with her. Many funny incidents happen around Ranjana. Later, it shows that Ranjana was invited by Togor (son of Mr. Shobhan), who forgot that he invited her. At the end of the film Togor marries Ranjana, Manager marries Mutky and Mizan marries Rohima (house-maid of Hasan). The film ends with Mr. Shobhan saying, "If you like the movie - it's ok. If you don't like - no problem."

== Cast ==
- Rahmat Ali as Mr. Shobhan
- Jayanta Chattopadhyay as The Manager
- Challenger as Karim (Husband of Ratri)
- Shadhin Khosru as Hasan (Husband of The youngest daughter)
- Rupok Talukder as Togor (The son of Mr. Shobhan)
- Tania Ahmed as Ranjana / Jori
- Shabnam Parvin as Mutky (The house-maid)
- Maznun Mizan as Mizan (The man with the manager)
- Diti as Ratri (The eldest daughter)
- Taniya Sultana Munni as The youngest daughter
- Choity as Hasan's house-maid

Guest Appearance

- Shohel Khan as doctor
- Asaduzzaman Noor as blacksmith
- Faruque Ahmed as first Mawlana
- Komol as second Mawlana
- Syed Hasan Sohel as third Mawlana
