= Mohammad Barkatullah (producer) =

Bangladeshi producer (died 2020)

- মোহাম্মদ বরকতুল্লাহ
- Born: c. 1944
- Died: 3 August 2020; Dhaka, Bangladesh
- Occupations: Television producer, director
- Spouse: Zeenat Barkatullah
- Children: Bijori Barkatullah

Mohammad Barkatullah (c. 1944 – 3 August 2020) was a Bangladeshi television producer and director. He served as general manager of Bangladesh Television (BTV) and worked on television dramas including Kothao Keu Nei, Shokal Shondha, Dhakay Thaki and Nokkhotrer Raat. He also served as the head of Channel One and Banglavision.

== Personal life ==
Barkatullah was married to dance artiste Zeenat Barkatullah. Together they had two daughters, actor Bijori Barkatullah and Kajori Barkatullah.

He died on 3 August 2020, at Green Life Medical College and Hospital in Dhaka after contracting COVID-19 during the COVID-19 pandemic in Bangladesh.

== Works ==
- Kothao Keu Nei
- Nokkhotrer Raat
- Shokal-Shondha
- Dhakay Thaki
- Chharpotro
