= Aguner Poroshmoni =

- Film's DVD cover
- Bengali: আগুনের পরশমণি
- Directed by: Humayun Ahmed
- Written by: Humayun Ahmed
- Starring: Asaduzzaman Noor; Bipasha Hayat; Abul Hayat; Dolly Johur; Dilara Zaman
- Music by: Satya Saha
- Release date: 10 May 1994 (Bangladesh)
- Country: Bangladesh
- Language: Bengali

Aguner Poroshmoni (Bengali: আগুনের পরশমণি) is a 1994 film based on the novel of the same name by Humayun Ahmed, who also directed the film. The film won National Film Award in eight categories including Best Picture, Best Director and Best Plot. It was the first movie directed by Humayun Ahmed.

== About ==
Humayun Ahmed made his debut as a filmmaker by releasing this film. It was released at a time when the middle-class people of the country had long turned their backs on Bangla films. Unconventional plot, humorous dialogues, lively characters and unique style of story line were the landmarks of the film. This is regarded as one of the finest movies in Bangladeshi cinema history on the 1971 liberation war.

== Cast ==
- Asaduzzaman Noor as Bodi
- Bipasha Hayat as Ratri
- Abul Hayat as Motin
- Dolly Johur as Surma
- Dilara Zaman
- Shila Ahmed as Opala
- Hosne Ara Putul as Binti, the housemaid
- Mozammel Hossain
- Salehuddin Ahmed as tea stall owner
- Tithi Haque
- Borna Priyadarshini
- Lutfur Rahman George

== Music ==
Aguner Poroshmoni

Soundtrack album by Satya Saha
- Released: 1994
- Recorded: 1994
- Genre: Feature film soundtrack
- Producer: Nuhash Chalachitra

Satya Saha chronology
Mohanogor (1981)	Aguner Poroshmoni (1994)	Ajante (1996)

The music of the film is scored by Satya Saha. Songs of Rabindranath Tagore and Hason Raja are used in the film.

No.	Title	Writer(s)	Artist	Length
1.	"Aguner Poroshmoni"	Rabindranath Tagore	Mita Haque
2.	"Nisha Lagilore"	Hason Raja	Shammi Akhtar
3.	"Esho Nipobone"	Rabindranath Tagore	Mita Haque
4.	"Chader Hashir Badh Bhengeche"	Rabindranath Tagore	Mita Haque
5.	"Ora Kara!"	Humayun Ahmed	Shofi Kamal

== Awards ==
This film won Bangladesh National Film Award in 8 categories including Best Picture, Best Director, and Best Plot.
