= Chandrokotha =

2003 Bangladeshi drama film

- DVD cover
- Bengali: চন্দ্রকথা
- Directed by: Humayun Ahmed
- Written by: Humayun Ahmed
- Starring: Asaduzzaman Noor; Ferdous Ahmed; Ahmed Rubel; Meher Afroz Shaon; Shadhin Khosru; Champa
- Cinematography: Mahfuzur Rahman Khan
- Edited by: Atiqur Rahman Mallik
- Music by: Maksud Jamil Mintu
- Production company: Nuhash Chalachitra
- Release date: 22 August 2003 (Bangladesh)
- Running time: 142 minutes
- Country: Bangladesh
- Language: Bengali

Chandrokotha is a 2003 Bengali drama film written and directed by Humayun Ahmed. It was produced and distributed by Nuhash Chalachitra. The film starred Ferdous Ahmed, Meher Afroz Shaon, Asaduzzaman Noor, Champa, Ahmed Rubel, Shadhin Khosru, Dr.Ezazul Islam and Monira Mithu in the lead roles. Meher Afroz Shaon and Ahmed Rubel won Best Film Actress and Actor awards in 6th Meril Prothom Alo Awards.

== Cast ==
- Ferdous Ahmed as Johir
- Meher Afroz Shaon as Chandra
- Asaduzzaman Noor as Zaminder Sarkar
- Ahmed Rubel as Amin
- Shadhin Khosru as Zaminder's Son
- Champa as Madina
- Dr.Ezazul Islam as School Teacher
- Monira Mithu as Chandra's Mother
- Bohota Saha as Joitori
- Nazmul Huda Bachchu as Village elder
- Dipak Kumar Sur as Village barber

== Soundtracks ==
All music is composed by Maksud Jamil Mintu.

No.	Title	Writer(s)	Artist	Length
1.	"O Amar Ural Ponkhi Re"	Humayun Ahmed	Subir Nandi
2.	"Amar Bhanga Ghore Bhanga Chala"	Humayun Ahmed	Runa Laila
3.	"Gorur Garir Dui Chakka"	Humayun Ahmed	Andrew Kishore
4.	"Chandni Poshore Ke"	Humayun Ahmed	Selim Chowdhury
5.	"Pothohara Pakhi"	Kazi Nazrul Islam	Meher Afroz Shaon
6.	"Amar Bhanga Ghore Bhanga Chala"	Humayun Ahmed	Runa Laila

== Accolades ==
Year	Awards	Department	Artist	Result	ref.
2004	Meril Prothom Alo Awards	Best Film Actor, Critics Choice Awards	Ahmed Rubel	Won	
2004	Meril Prothom Alo Awards	Best Film Actress, Critics Choice Awards	Meher Afroz Shaon	Won	
