= Falguni Hamid =

Bangladeshi actress

- Born: Falguni Roy Choudhury
- Education: University of Dhaka (MA)
- Occupations: Actor, playwright, director and producer
- Spouse: M Hamid (m. 1978)
- Children: Tonima Hamid

Falguni Hamid (Bengali: ফাল্গুনী হামিদ) is a Bangladeshi actress, playwright, director and producer. She served as the director of the Bangladesh Shishu Academy. She is the incumbent president of Bangladesh Cine-Journalist Association.

== Career ==
Hamid completed a master's degree in Bangla from the University of Dhaka. Hamid started her career as a journalist in "Banglar Bani". She was involved with journalism for 15 years. She passed the Bangladesh Television (BTV) audition in 1978 and joined the theatre troupe "Natyachakra". She performed in television drama serials in the 1980s.

Hamid is the owner of "Tele Real LTD", the first production house in Bangladesh. She ran the magazine "Shimontini", on women and children's issues.

== Personal life ==
Hamid has been married to M Hamid since 1978. Together they have a daughter, Tonima Hamid. Tonima is a television and stage actress.

In 2014, Hamid sought Bangladesh Awami League nomination for a parliamentary seat reserved for women.

== Works ==
Films

- Buker Bhitor Agun (1997)

== Television – Own and daughter Tonima Hamid ==
Title	Cast	Playwright/Director	Notes
Baunduler Attokahini	Tonima Hamid, Shohel Arman	Falguni Hamid	
Nivritochari	Tonima Hamid, Shahed Sharif Khan	Falguni Hamid	
Shesh Kotha	Tonima Hamid, Tony Dias	Falguni Hamid	
Nishitinee	Tonima Hamid, Zahid Hasan	Falguni Hamid	
Harano Shur	Tonima Hamid, Shahed Sharif Khan	Falguni Hamid	
Ekti Shopno O Ektu Vul	Tonima Hamid, Mahfuz Ahmed, Shahriar Nazim Joy	Falguni Hamid	
Hridoy Bilash	Tonima Hamid, Shahed Sharif Khan, Shahriar Nazim Joy	Falguni Hamid	
Nijhum Oronne	Tonima Hamid, Chanchal Chowdhury	Falguni Hamid	
Megher Velay Veshe Jabo Aaj	Tonima Hamid, Shahriar Nazim Joy, Hasan Masood	Falguni Hamid	
Kalaghor	Tonima Hamid, Shahed Sharif Khan, Abul Hayat, Hasan Masood	Falguni Hamid	
Nishithe	Tonima Hamid, Tony Dias	Falguni Hamid	
Ektuku Chowa Lage	Tonima Hamid, Mahfuz Ahmed	Falguni Hamid	
Shukher Kache	Tonima Hamid, Shahed Sharif Khan, Mita Noor	Falguni Hamid	Serial Natok
Hoimonti	Tonima Hamid, Mahfuz Ahmed	Falguni Hamid	
Nihshobder Shobdo	Tonima Hamid, Shahriar Nazim Joy	Falguni Hamid	
Shopner Eraboti	Tonima Hamid, Shahed Sharif Khan, Hasan Masood	Falguni Hamid	Serial Natok
Osonkho nil Rath	Tonima Hamid, Shahed Sharif Khan	Falguni Hamid	Serial Natok
Puramon	Tonima Hamid, Azizul Hakim		Serial Natok
Alo Adhare	Tonima Hamid, Shahed Sharif Khan, Bijori Barkatullah		
Attaglani	Tonima Hamid, Litu Anam		
JontroManobi	Tonima Hamid, Shahed Sharif Khan, Rumana Khan		
Nijhum Shimanter Bolaka	Tonima Hamid, Shahed Sharif Khan		Serial Natok
Feere Asha	Tonima Hamid, Zahid Hasan, Tony Dias		
Adhare Deep Sholaka	Tonima Hamid, Tony Dias		
Circuit House a Sei Raat	Tonima Hamid, Mahfuz Ahmed		
Bibaho Bivrat	Tonima Hamid, Shahed Sharif Khan		
Dithi	Tonima Hamid, Shahriar Nazim Joy		
Korkot Bhalobasa	Tonima Hamid, Litu Anam, Mita Noor		
Hisab Alir Bhul Hisab	Tonima Hamid, Tony Dias, Nadia Ahmed		
Tonatoni	Tonima Hamid, Shahriar Nazim Joy		
Ke Abar Bajay Bashi	Tonima Hamid, Dodul Ahmed		
Shonar Phool	Tonima Hamid, Shahed Sharif Khan, Tania Ahmed, Tauquir Ahmed		Serial Natok
Hothat Ekdin	Tonima Hamid, Shahed Sharif Khan, Ahsan Habib Nasim		Serial Natok
Lokki Sordarni	Tonima Hamid, Tanjir Ahmed Sizar		
Adorsho Meye	Tonima Hamid		

== Awards ==
- Sher-E-Bangla Smrity Award
- BACHSAS Award
- Drama Personality Award
- Kabita Parishad Award (2009)
