= Tonima Hamid =

Bangladeshi model and actress (born 1980)

- তনিমা হামিদ
- Born: Tonima Hamid; 27 August 1980 (age 46); Dhaka, Bangladesh
- Citizenship: Bangladeshi
- Education: University of Dhaka
- Occupations: Actress; Model; Educator
- Years active: 1992 – present
- Spouse: Shamsul Haider Dalim
- Children: 1
- Parent(s): M Hamid (father); Falguni Hamid (mother)

Tonima Hamid (Bengali: তনিমা হামিদ) is a Bangladeshi model, actress, and educator.

== Early life ==
Tonima Hamid was born on 27 August 1980 in Dhaka, Bangladesh to M Hamid and Falguni Hamid.

== Education ==
Tonima Hamid completed her Secondary School Certificate (SSC) at Agrani Girls High School in Azimpur, Dhaka. She later earned her master's degree from the Department of History at the University of Dhaka.

== Career ==
Tonima began her acting career at the age of three or four, with her first stage performance in Bracket's Chalk Circle as Shahjada Bulbul. In 1992, while in class 7, she acted in a Tagore short story titled Mallodan. Since then, she has performed in numerous plays with her team, Natyachakra, including Let There Be Light.

Eka Eka Nari was the 54th production featuring Tonima Hamid, directed by Debarasad Debnath and based on Franca Rame's A Woman Alone. In this production, Tonima portrayed Maria, a character that represents women's oppression and abuse. The play was first staged in March 2025 and performed at Bangladesh Mahila Samity on September 9, 2025, with design contributions from Nasirul Haque Khokon, Ahsan Reza Tushar, Irin Parvin Lopa, and Zunaed Yusuf.

She currently serves as an Assistant Professor in the Department of Economics, the Deputy Head of the Career Counselling Center (CCC), and the Coordinator of the Emergence of Bangladesh Program at East West University.

== Personal life ==
Tonima Hamid is the daughter of M.Hamid and Falguni Hamid. She is married to Shamsul Haider Dalim, who is a news presenter and host. She is the mother of a boy named Arniv.

== Filmography ==
=== Theatre ===
Year	Drama	Co-Artist	Director	Network
2019	A Woman alone(Eka Ek Nari)		Debu Prashad Debonath	
	Let there be light			
	Hayena			
	Bilkis Banur Konnara			
	Chalk Circle			

=== Television drama ===
Year	Drama	Co-Artist	Director	Network
1992	Mallodan			BTV
1996	Jurinda	Tauquir Ahmed, Sanjeeb Chowdhury		
	Konna Kumari	Shahriar nazim Joy		
1999	Hoimonti	Mahfuz Ahmed, Bulbul Ahmed	Anindyo Awal	
2020	Bakkhalir Bake	Pallob		
2001	Shesher Kabita Noy	Tony Dias		ETV
	LAL GOLA	Tony Dias		
	Voddrnok	Tulika		
	KONKAL	Tony Dias		
	Dristy	Shahriar nazim Joy, Ataur Rahman		
2016	Tiger Vai	Hasan Masud		
	Dhakar Hozza	Ahsan Habib Nasim		
2013	E Bari O Bari	Azizul Hakim, Tania Ahmed, Shahriar Nazim Joy, Chitralekha Guha and Fakhrul Hasan Bairagi	Nazrul Islam Siddique.	RTV
	KAKTALEO	Nasim		
	Shukher KHASA	Shahed Sharif Khan, Pallob		
	Khoj			
	Daybondhon			
	Bogurar Sir			
	Tomtom			
	Shilpi			
	Dainik Torpar			
2007	Baunduler Attokahini	Sohel Arman	Falguni Hamid	
	Nivritochari	Shahed Sharif Khan	Falguni Hamid	
	Biroher Sanay			
	Shesh Kotha	Tony Dias	Falguni Hamid	
	Nishitinee	Zahid Hasan, Aupee Karim	Falguni Hamid	
2017	Ekti Shopno O Ektu Vul	Mahfuz Ahmed, Shahriar Nazim Joy	Falguni Hamid	Boishakhi TV
2009	Hridoy Bilash	Shahed Sharif Khan, Shahriar Nazim Joy, Chanchal Chowdhury, pallob	Falguni Hamid	
2020	Nijhum Oronne	Chanchal Chowdhury, Animash Chowdhury	Falguni Hamid	
	Megher Velay Veshe Jabo Aaj	Shahriar Nazim Joy, Hasan Masood	Falguni Hamid	
	MAMAR BIYE	Chitralekha Guha		
	Kalaghor	Shahed Sharif Khan, Abul Hayat, Hasan Masood	Falguni Hamid	
	NIVITOCHARE	SAHAD	Falguni Hamid	
	Nihshobder Shobdo	Shahriar Nazim Joy	Falguni Hamid	
2018	Alo Adhare	Shahed Sharif Khan, Bijori Barkatullah		
	Attaglani	Litu Anam		
	JontroManobi	Shahed Sharif Khan, Rumana Khan		
	Feere Asha	Zahid Hasan, Tony Dias		
	Adhare Deep Sholaka	Tony Dias		
1998	Circuit House a Sei Raat	Mahfuz Ahmed, Tanzid Sezar		
	Bibaho Bivrat	Shahed Sharif Khan, Mujahid Mohammad Mehjan	Mujahid Mohammad Mehjan	
	Dithi	Shahriar Nazim Joy		
	Korkot Bhalobasa	Litu Anam, Mita Noor		
	Hisab Alir Bhul Hisab	Tony Dias, Nadia Ahmed		
	Ke Abar Bajay Bashi	Dodul Ahmed		
	Lokki Sordarni	Tanjir Ahmed Sijar		

=== Radio drama ===
Year	Drama Series	Co-Artist	Director	Network
2021	Sofor Alir Sukh Dukkho		Nasrin Mostafa	Bangladesh Betar

=== Drama Series ===
Year	Drama Series	Co-Artist	Director	Network
	Ke Amar	Fakhrul Hasan Boiragi, Tanzid Sezar, Harun Kisinger, Kajol		
	Dotcom Fantasy			
	Nishithe	Tony Dias	Falguni Hamid	
	ParaPorshi	Shahed Sharif Khan, Pallob, faruk Ahmed		
2015	Swapner Iraboti	Moutushi Biswas	Falguni Hamid’	ATN Bangla
2014	Taan		Falguni Hamid	
	Shukher Kache	Shahed Sharif Khan, Mita Noor	Falguni Hamid	Serial Natok
	Osonkho nil Rath	Shahed Sharif Khan	Falguni Hamid	Serial Natok
	Puramon	Azizul Hakim		Serial Natok
	Nijhum Shimanter Bolaka	Shahed Sharif Khan		Serial Natok
	Shonar Phool	Shahed Sharif Khan, Tania Ahmed, Toukir Ahmed		Serial Natok
	Hothat Ekdin	Shahed Sharif Khan, Ahsan Habib Nasim		Serial Natok
	BHRANTI	Tanzid Sezar, ANIMESH CHOWDHURY	Falguni Hamid	
	Mati	Sadek Bachchu, Azizul Hakim, Shabnaz		

=== Telefilms ===
Year	Telefilm	Co-Artist	Director	Network
	Tonatuni	Shahriar Nazim Joy		
	Harano Shur	Shahed Sharif Khan, JOYONTO, AFROZA, TAJ TANIA, MONOJ, RAFIQUE.NAZRUL, RAJIB, DIPOK, SHATHI	Falguni Hamid	
2017	Megher Velay Vese Jabo Aj	Shahriar Najim Joy, Ishana	Falguni Hamid	
2019	Ektuku Chowa Lage	Mahfuz Ahmed	Falguni Hamid	

=== TVC ===
Year	TVC	Co-Artist	Director
2015	Canton Soup		Roni Bhowmik Tonima
1999	Litchi Drinks		Masum Aziz

=== Television host ===
Year	Show	Co-Artist	Director	Network
2019	Nana Sade Radhuni			Machranga TV
