= Afsana Ara Bindu =

Bangladeshi model and actress

Afsan Ara Bindu
- আফসানা আরা বিন্দু
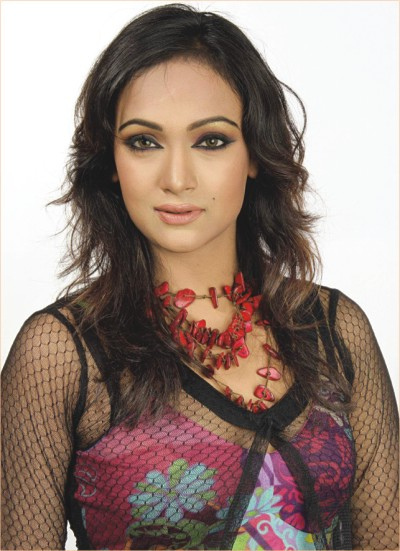
- Bindu in 2012
- Born: 14 January 1988 (age 38); Dhaka, Bangladesh
- Education: Jahangirnagar University
- Occupations: Actress, model
- Years active: 2006–2015, 2023
- Notable work: Daruchini Dip; Jaago - Dare To Dream; Eito Prem
- Awards: 1st runner up of the Lux Channel I Superstar - 2006

Afsan Ara Bindu (Bengali: আফসানা আরা বিন্দু; born 14 January 1988) is a Bangladeshi model and actress. She got her break as a model on the 2006 season of reality television show Lux Channel I Superstar, in which she was the first runner-up. Soon after this, she landed a brief role in Tauquir Ahmed's Daruchini Dip. She then appeared in Jaago - Dare to Dream and Piriter Agun Jole Digun. Bindu's last film was Eito Prem (2015)

== Career ==
Bindu is a model, presenter and actress. She comes in film win after Peeriter Dokandari. Then she has worked Daruchini Deep and Jaago in these movies. Besides, she has also worked in film like Priter Agun Jole Digun and Eito Prem. She has acting with different actors in film as Arefin Shuvo, Ferdous, Emon, Shakib Khan and so on. Besides, she has also worked in drama, telefilm, package drama and advertisement. She has worked with many actors in the drama such as Shajal, Chanchal Chowdhury, Mosharraf Karim, and Nobel and so on.

== Awards and nominations ==
- 1st runner up of the 2006 LUX Channel I Superstar
- Nominated in primary selection of Meril-Prothom Alo Award Show for her film Daruchini Deep

== Filmography ==
Year	Title	Role	Co-star	Notes
2007	Daruchini Dip	Anushka	Riaz	
2010	Jaago - Dare To Dream		Arifin Shuvoo, Ferdous	
2011	Piriter Agun Jole Digun	Bindu	Mamnun Hasan Emon, Shabnur	
2015	Eito Prem	Madhabi	Shakib Khan	
2023	Unish20	Sheela	Arifin Shuvoo	Webfilm

=== Web series ===
Year	Title	Role	Notes	Ref.
2026	Headline	Irene	Series on Hoichoi	

== Television ==
Year	Title	Director	Co-stars	Ref(s)
	Mugdho Nilimar Prantay	Chayanika Chowdhury	Apurba, Milon	
	Onakankhito	Chayanika Chowdhury	Arifin Shuvoo, Sharmili Ahmed	
	Duti Ghasforing O Ekti Mrittu	Sakal Ahmed	Arifin Shuvoo	
	Lal Golap Shada Mon	Chayanika Chowdhury	Mahfuz, Farah Ruma	
	Tomay Chere Kothay Jabo		Shajal	
	Ekhanei Shesh Noy		Shajal	
	Nirobe 3 Minute		Nobel, Tania	
	Dulche Dolna		Shajal	
	Sorry		Shajal	
	Ek Akash Neel		Shajal	
	Chotobela		Shajal	
	Bilombito Ticket	Mesbah Shikdar	Apurba	
	Megh Maa		Apurba, Rusha(Child Artist)	
	Megh	Chayanika Chowdhury	Apurba	
	Chena Chena Lage		Shajal	
	Prothom Prem	Masud Sezan	Mosharraf Karim	
	Chaya Pother Chaya	Chayanika Chowdhury	Apurba, Aupee Karim	
	Tritiojon		Apurba, Mahfuz Ahmed	
	Sonali Kolom	Chayanika Chowdhury	Apurba, Shahiduzzaman Selim	
	Maa		Apurba, Diti	
	Brishty Kal Kandbe	Chayanika Chowdhury	Apurba	
	Sowrov		Shajal	
	Neel Panjabi		Shajal	
	Chorkata		Shajal	
	Shanti Chuktir Ekdin		Chanchal Chowdhury	
	Biborno Chawa		Chanchal Chowdhury	
	Thogini		Chanchal Chowdhury	
	Takar Britto		Zahid Hasan	
	Bari Number 45		Milon	
	Sokher Gari		Hasan Masood	
	Bagh Bondi Khela		FS Nayem	
	Prothom Dekha		Shajal	
	Valobasha Valobasha		Shajal	
	Chitrokolpo		Shajal	
	Priyojon		Shajal Noor	
2013	Kudduser Murgi Prem		Mir Sabbir	
	System Chor		Shajal Noor	
