= Farah Ruma =

Bangladeshi model and television actress

- Born: 26 March 1973 (age 52)
- Occupations: Actress, model, dancer
- Years active: 1997 – present
- Spouse: (m. 2012)
- Children: 1

Farah Ruma is a Bangladeshi model and television actress. Farah Ruma won the Lux Anandadhara Ms. Photogenic award in 1997.

== Personal life ==
She married an American expatriate businessman on 1 December 2012. On 30 August 2016, Farah Ruma gave birth to a baby boy in the US. She named his son Janash. She was born on 26 March.

== Career ==
Farah Ruma started her career as a model. In 1997 Farah Ruma won a beauty contest called Lux-Anandadhara Ms. Photogenic award. In 2002 she was seen in Afzal Hossain's drama Shako. She appeared in Shuvodrishti, directed by Ferdous Hassan in 2004. Shuvodrishti is based on story by Rabindranath Tagore.

Farah Ruma acted in numerous television dramas, commercials and teleflims. She was presenter on the television show Amaro Gaite Ichche Holo. Ruma was one of the judges of the talent hunt, "Lux-Channel i Super Star 2009. She now own a production house known as FR Productions.

== Works ==
=== Television drama ===
Year	Drama	Co-Artist	Director	Network
2002	Sanko	Afzal Hossain	Afzal Hossain	Channel i
2004	Shuvodrishti			
	Ladia			
	Sindhuk			
	Freme Badhano Prem	Iresh Zaker		
	Shampurno Rangin			
	Shawla			
	Gourochandrika			
	Eishob Andhakar			
	Ekta Kinle Ekta Free			
	Lal Golap			
	Shada Mon			
2007	Shohorer Bhorer Phul			
2012	Ekhono Musholdhare Brishti Jhore		Chayanika Chowhury	
2012	Darkak o Doyeler Golpo		Shahriar Najim Joy	
2012	Halogen Rohoshyo			
2015	Chor		Noim Imtiaz Neyamul	GTV
2015	Hridoyer Gaan		Chayanika Chowhury	
2015	Tomar Prithibi Chhere		Chayanika Chowhury	
2015	Dhushor Pandulipi	Apurbo		
2013	Pora Prem	Mahfuz Ahmed	Chayanika Chowhury	
2014	Tanaporen			
2014	Obastob bastob			
2018	Shopnodrishow	Zahid Hasan, Anjuman Ara Bakul.		NTV
2017	Deuwa Polao Dot Com	Mosharraf Karim, Joyraj, Pran Roy, Asif		
2015	Dak	Apurba	BU Shuv	NTV
	Sei Golaper Ghran			
2019	Chap	Mahfuz Ahmed		Bangla Vision
	Chaitrer Bristy	Apurba		
	Dudowali	Fazlur Rahman Babu, Oahida Mollik Joli, Anowarul Haque, Farhana Mithu, Irfan Selim Sujoy,		ATN
	Sukkho Pracir	Apurba		
	Praner Pore	Apurba		
2017	Jot	Anisur Rahman Milon		Boishakhi TV
2017	Bajbe Shanai	Agun		
	Nokol Valobasa	Shariyar Nazim Joy		
	Bebodhan	Zahid Hasan, Intekhab Dinar		
	Amra Jege achi	Ezazul Islam	Humayun Ahmed	NTV
	Rang Baaz	Anisur Rahman Milon		
	Ohonkar			
2017	Kemon Acho Tumi	Mahfuz Ahmed, Aupee Karim, Tauquir Ahmed		NTV
	Boishakhi Jhor			

=== Drama series ===
Year	Drama Series	Co-Artist	Director	Network
2008	Amar Bou Shob Jane	Alamgir, Ferdousi Majumdar, Subarna Mustafa, Humayun Faridi, Mita Chowdhury, Mamunur Rashid, Tisha, Raunak Hassan, Saleh Ahmed, Diti, Dilara Zaman, Dolly Zahur, Tarana Halim, Al Mamun and Amin Azad		
2012	Omimangshito Golpo		Ohiduzzaman Diamond.	
2012	Maya Nigam		Golam Mostofa Shimul	
2012	Shesh Kotha			
2013	Dumb			
2018	Tokhon Hoimonto	Humayun Faridi, Sadia Islam Mou, Jitu Ahsan,		Boishakhi TV
2019	Ashare Golpo	Khayrul Alam Shobuj, Sultana Rebu, Afsana Ara Bindu, Mosharraf Karim, Nafiza, Shahriar Shuvo, Shagota, Trisha, Arman Parvez Murad, Saif Shamim		NTV

=== Telefilms ===
Year	Telefilm	Co-Artist	Director	Network
2010	Ek Minute Nirobota	Iresh Zaker, Humaira Himu and Lina Ahmed	Farah Ruma	Channel i
2015	Sraboner Shatdin			
2015	Ondhokare Kuyasha		Anjan Aich	
2015	Chandrabindu	Riaz	Gautam Koiree	
2017	Tourist	Moushumi, Shahed,		NTV
2017	Amakeo Shonge Nio	Shampa Reza, Mahfuz Ahmed, Sanjida Preeti		Boishakhi TV
2018	Chithi			
2018	Full Stop	Hillol, Grihovritto	Sushmoy Sumon	

=== Films ===
Year	Film	Co-Artist	Director
2015	Putro Ekhon Paisawala	Babita | Emon	Nargis Akhter

=== TVC ===
Lux

Cosmos Biscuit

Purbachal City

=== TV show ===
Amaro Gaite Ichche Holo
