= Shell and Joint =

2019 film

- Promotional release poster
- Directed by: Isamu Hirabayashi
- Produced by: Tatsuo Ito; Madoka Katsumata
- Starring: Mariko Tsutsui; Keisuke Horibe
- Music by: Takashi Watanabe
- Release date: April 2019 (MIFF)
- Running time: 154 minutes
- Countries: Japan; Finland
- Language: Japanese

Shell and Joint is a 2019 film directed by Isamu Hirabayashi and starring Mariko Tsutsui and Keisuke Horibe as co-workers in a Japanese capsule hotel.

The film was screened at the 41st Moscow International Film Festival in April 2019. It had its North American premiere at the Slamdance Film Festival in January 2020.

== Cast ==
- Mariko Tsutsui as Yoko Sakamoto
- Keisuke Horibe as Nitobe
- Kanako Higashi
- Aiko Sato
- Hiromi Kitagawa
- Atsuko Sudo
- Ayano Kudo
- Naoto Nojima

== Release ==
Shell and Joint was screened at the 41st Moscow International Film Festival in April 2019.

The film had its North American premiere at the Slamdance Film Festival in January 2020. It was also selected as one of 30 feature films to be screened during the 2020 Japan Cuts film festival, which was held from July 17 to July 30, 2020; the festival took place online as a virtual event due to the COVID-19 pandemic.

== Critical reception ==
Film critic Tony Rayns called Shell and Joint "a fascinating puzzle film, both wryly humorous and deeply serious, which sets a new tone in Japanese cinema and opens up new possibilities for narrative cinema. It's the finest new Japanese film I've seen in months." Dylan Andresen of Film Threat praised the film's cinematography but noted a perceived lack of cohesion in its narrative, and called it "not for the faint of heart, short of attention, or shallow of thought. However, if you can scale the one-inch barrier of subtitles and are looking for a film to ignite the scientist or philosopher within then, this film is worth the watch."
