= Shahed Sharif Khan =

Bangladeshi actor

- শাহেদ শরীফ খান
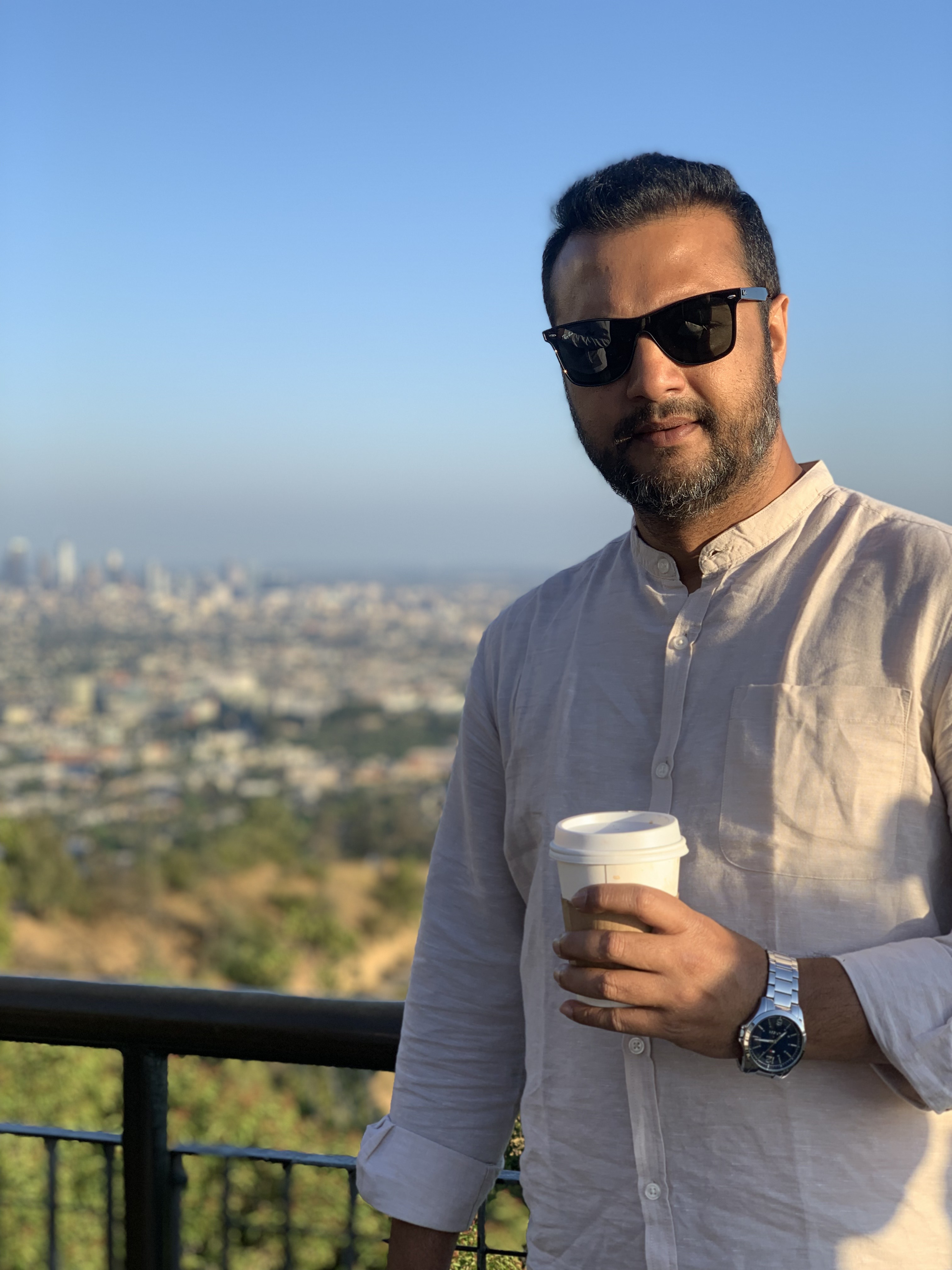
- Notable work: Shenapati, Prio Shathi, Joy Jatra, Hridoy Sudhu Tomar Jonno, Tok Jhal Mishti
- Spouse: Natasha Hayat (m. 2003)
- Father: Mohammad Ibrahim Khan
- Relatives: Abul Hayat (father-in-law); Bipasha Hayat (sister-in-law); Tauquir Ahmed (co brother-in-law)

Shahed Sharif Khan is a Bangladeshi television and film actor, director, and writer. In 1998, he started working as the first model. He has been nominated for the Meril Prothom Alo Awards three times. Best known for his role in Hridoy Shudhu Tomar Jonno in 2004. Among the notable works are Senapati, Priyo Sathi, Joyjatra, Tok Jhal Mishti. He has acted in Bengali-language films, both in Bangladesh and West Bengal.

== Personal life ==
In 2003, Shahed married veteran actor Abul Hayat's daughter Natasha Hayat. They met through mutual friends.

== Career ==
Sharif Khan started his career in 2000 with the television series Ekannoborti, where he was featured alongside Moutushi Biswas, who also began her career in it, and Abul Hayat. The show was written by Anisul Hoque and directed by Mostofa Sarwar Farooki. Sharif Khan made his debut with Tak Jhal Mishti in 2002. His notable appearances including Sajedur Rahman Saju's romance drama Hridoy Shudhu Tomar Jonno co-starring with Shakib Khan and Shabnur and Tauquir Ahmed's war drama Joyjatra in 2004. His another project with Tauquir Ahmed was Oggatonama in 2016, which won three National Film Award including Best Film. In 2017, Indian director Riingo Banerjee cast him in Senapati opposite Bollywood actors Riya Sen and Parambrata Chatterjee.

Sharif Khan and Moutushi Biswas worked together again in Chayanika Chowdhury's Koshto Koshto Shukh and Father, May I Hold Your Hand, directed by Abul Hayat, his father-in-law. In 2020, he played the role of a father in a short film about a girl who was raped as a teenager called "Patrisotta". He performed with Shakib Khan in another film Antaratma in 2021, which is still unreleased.

== Films ==
Year	Film	Role	Notes	Ref.
2004	Joyjatra	Kashem	Winner - Bangladesh National Film Awards for Best Actor	
2004	Hridoy Shudhu Tomar Jonno	Akash		
2005	Tok Jhal Mishti	Himself	Cameo appearance	
2007	Priyo Sathi	Shahed		
2015	Cheleti Abol Tabol Meyeti Pagol Pagol	Rudro		
2016	Oggatonama	Wadud		
2019	Shenapati	Vishnu Shenapati	Debut Indian Bengali film	
2021	Mr. K	Mister Khan	Telefilm on Bongo BD	
2023	Ashomvob	Shanto		
2025	Antaratma	Zaker		

== Television ==
Year	Title	Director	Role	Broadcast Channel	Notes
	Shopno				
	Ariana				
	Kanamachi				
	Bho Bho				
	Dohon				
2002	Onno Mon	Robin Khan			with Model Tinni
	Akannoborti				
	Shompurno Rongin				
	Odvuture				
	Jedike Takai Tumi				
2018	Aposh			Channel i	
	Cithibaji				
	Onekei Eka				
	Tomar Amar Golpo				
	Nivritocari				
	Kotokal Dekheni Tomay				
	Soikot Manosi				
	Dukkho Bilash				
	Hanimun				
	Ocena Ayna				
	Ruposir Khoje				
	Pranabanta Prithok Purus				
	Shrabonti Pallaber Golpo				
	Nodi				
	Akasher Upore Akash			NTV	
2026	Aponjon	Jakaria Showkhin			with Deepa Khandakar, Niha & Farhan Ahmed Jovan
2026	Mayapakhi	Jakaria Showkhin	Abrar Athar	Channel i	with Shertaj Jahan Jebin, Niha & Apurba

=== Television drama ===
- Ainar Shatha Alingon telecasted at ATN Bangla.
- Fashion (26 Episode) telecasted at Channel i.
- Astalavista telecasted at Boisakhi TV.
- Bubai telecasted at Channel i.

== Poetry ==
In 2017, Sharif Khan published a book of poems titled Tomar Jonno, with verses that follow the form of conversations, which he personally presented at the Ekushey Book Fair.
