= Unish20 =

Bangladeshi film

- Unish20 poster
- Directed by: Mizanur Rahman Aryan
- Produced by: Chorki
- Starring: Arifin Shuvoo; Afsana Ara Bindu
- Cinematography: Sheikh Rajibul Islam
- Production company: Alpha-i
- Release date: 13 February 2023
- Country: Bangladesh
- Language: Bangla

Unish20 is a 2023 Bangladeshi OTT film from the digital platform Chorki originals. It was directed by Mizanur Rahman Aryan. The film stars Arefin Shuvoo, Afsana Ara Bindu, Intekhab Dinar, Tania Ahmed, Wahida Mollick Jolly, Sabiha Zaman, Hasan Masood and Arfan Mredha Shiblu. A romantic comedy, it was released on 13 February 2023.

== Plot ==
The story revolves around Opu, a boy with poetry in his heart and yet reluctant to engage in any relationship. He meets Sheela in an office meeting where she votes against a proposal made by Opu. They engage in a murmur of arguments and Sheela develops a dislike for Opu. Later Opu wants to be friends with Sheela and sends her a stamp agreement with the terms and conditions of their friendship. Sheela reads and smiles at it. Their friendship goes off to a wonderful start. Opu used to write poems for Sheela, but he stopped writing after sometime. At the 1st anniversary celebration of their friendship, Sheela gifts her a pen asks him to write poems for her again. At that night while talking over phone, Sheela's sister, Dola mocks her of always being on phone with Opu and tells her to marry him off. Hearing this Opu says he'd rather go off as a saint somewhere rather marry someone. At that Sheela taunts her saying he doesn't have what it takes. So Opu jokingly takes on a bet that he'd propose Sheela's father for her hand. The next day, Sheela wakes up to see huge arrangements in her house. When she asks Dola what happened, she confesses she told everyone that her boyfriend is coming to her house with a marriage proposal. Sheela tries telling her father the truth but couldn't make it as he gets emotional. So she calls Opu to come and solve the matter. That night, Opu comes and has a chat with her dad but couldn't tell what he came to instead went away with an invitation to bring his family with him next day. Later Opu and Sheela plans to tell the truth in front of everyone the next day. Yet again they fail to tell the truth as their families bond wonderfully with a few members being known to each other from before. Later Opu tries really hard to delay the marriage but nobody agrees with him. So they decide to flee on the night of their marriage. At the bus stop, they have a slightly emotional chat where Sheela confesses that she indeed wants to marry Opu. Opu accepts and they both come back and gets married without anyone ever knowing about it. The next morning Opu wakes up and realizes he had made a grave mistake. He goes to his office and takes a week off and goes off with his friends on picnic telling Sheela that he'll be back in 3 days and would take her to their honeymoon for the next 4 days. But he comes back after 7 days breaking Sheela's heart for the first time. Next morning, Sheela writes a letter to Opu and tells him to take her somewhere on an outing like they used to when they were friends. So Opu takes her out and they both share some romantic moments there. Later in Opu's office, a new lady starts to work on a project with Opu named Rubina. Aside from work, Rubina becomes interested on Opu and they become fast friends. While Opu becomes careless about Sheela and his family life. On his birthday, Rubina invites him to her house whereas Sheela arranges a surprise party in the house inviting all the family members. But as Opu goes to Rubina's house, they get drunk and Rubina tries to seduce Opu but fails. Opu comes home late and by the time all the guests had left and the party doesn't happen. Opu throws a tantrum seeing all those arrangements and decoration and rips them apart. His mother revealing that, Opu's father used to take him on his birthday and since he left them, he hates his birthday and has lost his belief upon relationships. Sheela comes to their room and finds a rugged Opu on the bed. She fixes him on the bed and his phone pings out. She checks his phone and finds chats with Rubina and their photos of drinking together on bed. The next morning Opu wakes up and finds out Sheela has left and his mother asks him who was Rubina. Opu tries to bring her back but instead she sends a divorce letter to Opu and he signs it off. They meet again in Opu's niece's birthday party where she tells him that she's getting married again. Later he meets her fiancé Rashed. And Sheela infuriated to about this comes to Opu and tells him to leave the city at the day of her marriage. So Opu leaves Dhaka and comes to Cox's Bazar at the day of her marriage and suddenly finds Sheela there. Sheela tells her that Rashed finds her crying for Opu and calls off the wedding and sends her here. The story ends with a romantic scene of them in arms in front of the sea.

== Cast ==
- Arifin Shuvoo as Opu
- Afsana Ara Bindu as Sheela
- Wahida Mollick Jolly as Opu's mom
- Sabiha Zaman as Sheela's mom
- Tania Ahmed as Rubina
- Hasan Masood as Opu's boss
- Sushmita Sinha as Dola (Sheela's younger sister)
- Elina Shammi as Sheela's elder sister
- Arfan Mredha Shiblu as Opu's friend
- Intekhab Dinar as Rashed

== Reception ==
The Daily Star was appreciative of the film's cast but stated, "However, perhaps the film would have been a bit better if more thought was put into the screenplay and dialogues of the film as well." Shuvoo's performance was praised in Kalerkantho.
