= Falguni =

Falguni may refer to:

- Falguni (given name), an Indian female given name
- Phalguna, a month of the Hindu calendar (February-March)
- an asterism and lunar mansion in traditional Hindu astronomy and astrology, see Nakshatra#List of Nakshatras
- Uttar Falguni, a 1963 Indian drama film by Asit Sen

== See also ==
- Phalguni (disambiguation)
- Sailajananda Falguni Smriti Mahavidyalaya, a college in West Bengal, India
