= Made in Bangladesh (disambiguation) =

Made in Bangladesh is the mark affixed to products manufactured in Bangladesh. It may also refer to:

- Made in Bangladesh (2006 film), a 2006 Bangladeshi film
- Made in Bangladesh (2019 film), a 2019 Bangladeshi film
