= Bachelor (2004 film) =

Bangladeshi film from 2004

- Theatrical release poster
- Bengali: ব্যাচেলর
- Directed by: Mostofa Sarwar Farooki
- Screenplay by: Anisul Haque
- Starring: Humayun Faridi; Ahmed Rubel; Ferdous Ahmed; Hasan Masood
- Cinematography: Saiful Islam Badal
- Edited by: Junaid Halim
- Music by: Ayub Bachchu; Pablo; Bappa Mazumder; S.I. Tutul
- Production company: Impress Telefilm Ltd.
- Distributed by: Impress Telefilm Ltd.
- Release date: 29 January 2004 (Bangladesh)
- Running time: 148 mins
- Country: Bangladesh
- Language: Bengali

Bachelor (alternative title Bachelor: The Circle, Bengali: ব্যাচেলর) is a 2004 Bangladeshi comedy-drama-romance film directed by Mostofa Sarwar Farooki, in his feature directorial debut. It stars Humayun Faridi, Ahmed Rubel, Ferdous Ahmed, and Hasan Masood. The film was released on January 29, 2004, in Bangladesh. Aupee Karim's performance, in her feature film debut, won the Bangladesh National Film Award for Best Actress.

== Cast ==
- Humayun Faridi as Abrar
- Ahmed Rubel as Rumel
- Ferdous Ahmed as Fahim
- Hasan Masood as Hasan
- Marzuk Russell as Marzuk
- Arman Parvez Murad as Maruf
- Alien Shohag (Anisul Haque Chowdhury Shohag) as Shohag
- Elora Gohor as Fahmida
- Shabnur as Shamma
- Aupee Karim as Sathi
- Jaya Ahsan as Shaila
- Sumaiya Shimu as Zerin
- Moutushi Biswas as Mona
- Dilara Zaman as Shamma's mother
- Mou
- Shrestha as Shrestha
- Maliha
- Mita
- Rifat Chowdhury
- Tokon Thakur
- Rafi Hossain
- Saifullah Mahmud Dulal
- Ashutosh Sujon as Masud Rana
- Shuvo Raihan as Abrar's caregiver

== Production ==
Mostofa Sarwar Farooki and screenwriter Anisul Haque had previously collaborated on a number of television serials such as Ekannaborti. Given a five-page synopsis by Farooki, Haque wrote approximately three drafts of the script, not counting minor revisions.

Farooki cast several actors from Ekannaborti, including Arman Parvez Murad, Aupee Karim, Moutushi, and Dilara Zaman. Journalist Hasan Masood was hired despite having no previous acting experience. In addition to Masood, Bachelor was the feature film debut of Murad, Karim, Moutushi, Marzuk Russel, Jaya Masood, and Sumaiya Shimu.

Bachelor was also television director Farooki's feature film directorial debut. He had neither formal training in film nor practical experience with it. Reflecting on the filming four films later, in 2012, he said, "At that time I had no video monitor, and couldn't really see anything, so it was difficult for me to understand the medium." "I had a hard time crafting my images." It was an opportunity for him to make mistakes and learn from them.

== Release ==
Bachelor was released at Balaka cinema hall in Dhaka, Bangladesh on 29 January 2004. Two days later, on Eid al-Adha, it was broadcast on Bangladeshi television network Channel i, a sister firm of production company Impress Telefilm. It did not receive a wide theatrical distribution outside Bangladesh, but was shown at two festivals, Asiatica Film Mediale in Rome and the Third Eye Asian Film Festival in Mumbai.

The film was widely watched by the Bangladeshi middle class, according to professor in media and communication Zakir Hossain Raju. The story of romantic relationships among urban youths resonated with the young generation. Harun ur Rashid, writing in The Daily Star, said it marked a "'Good-bye' to the cliché melodramatic dhishoom-dhishoom movies" audiences were accustomed to. Matthew Scott, summarizing Farooki's output for Agence France Presse a decade later, wrote, "What makes Farooki's work different is its contemporary take on the lives and troubles of young Bangladeshis."

For her performance as Fahim's girlfriend, Karim won Best Actress at the 29th Bangladesh National Film Awards.

== Music ==
Bachelor - The Circle

Soundtrack album
- Released: 2004
- Genre: Feature film soundtrack
- Label: Soundtek

No.	Title	Artist(s)	Length
1.	"69 (Ami To Preme Porini)"	Ayub Bachchu	4:25
2.	"Keu Prem Kore"	S I Tutul	5:02
3.	"Pagla Ghora"	Asif Akbar	4:26
4.	"Gollay Niye Jacche"	Pantho Kanai	3:38
5.	"Bhaj Kholo"	Sanjeeb Chowdhury	4:29
6.	"Pakhi Shastro"	Pothik Nobi	4:30
7.	"Ajke Nahoy Bhalobasho"	Hasan Masood	4:23

=== Personal ===
Music

- Ayub Bachchu
- Pablo
- Bappa Mazumder
- S.I. Tutul

Vocals

- Ayub Bachchu
- Asif Akbar
- Sanjeeb Chowdhury
- Pothik Nobi
- Pantho Kanai
- S.I. Tutul
- Hasan Masood

Lyrics

- Marzuk Russell
- Kamruzzaman Kamu
- Kabir Bakul
