= Falguni (given name) =

Falguni (meaning "of Falgun") is a Bengali given name that may refer to

- Falguni Hamid, Bangladeshi actress, playwright, director and producer
- Falguni Pathak (born 1964), Indian singer, performing artist, and composer
- Falguni Rahman Jolly (born 1996), Bangladeshi film actress and model
- Falguni Roy (1945–1981), Bengali poet
