= Azizul Hakim =

Bangladeshi television, film and stage actor

- আজিজুল হাকিম
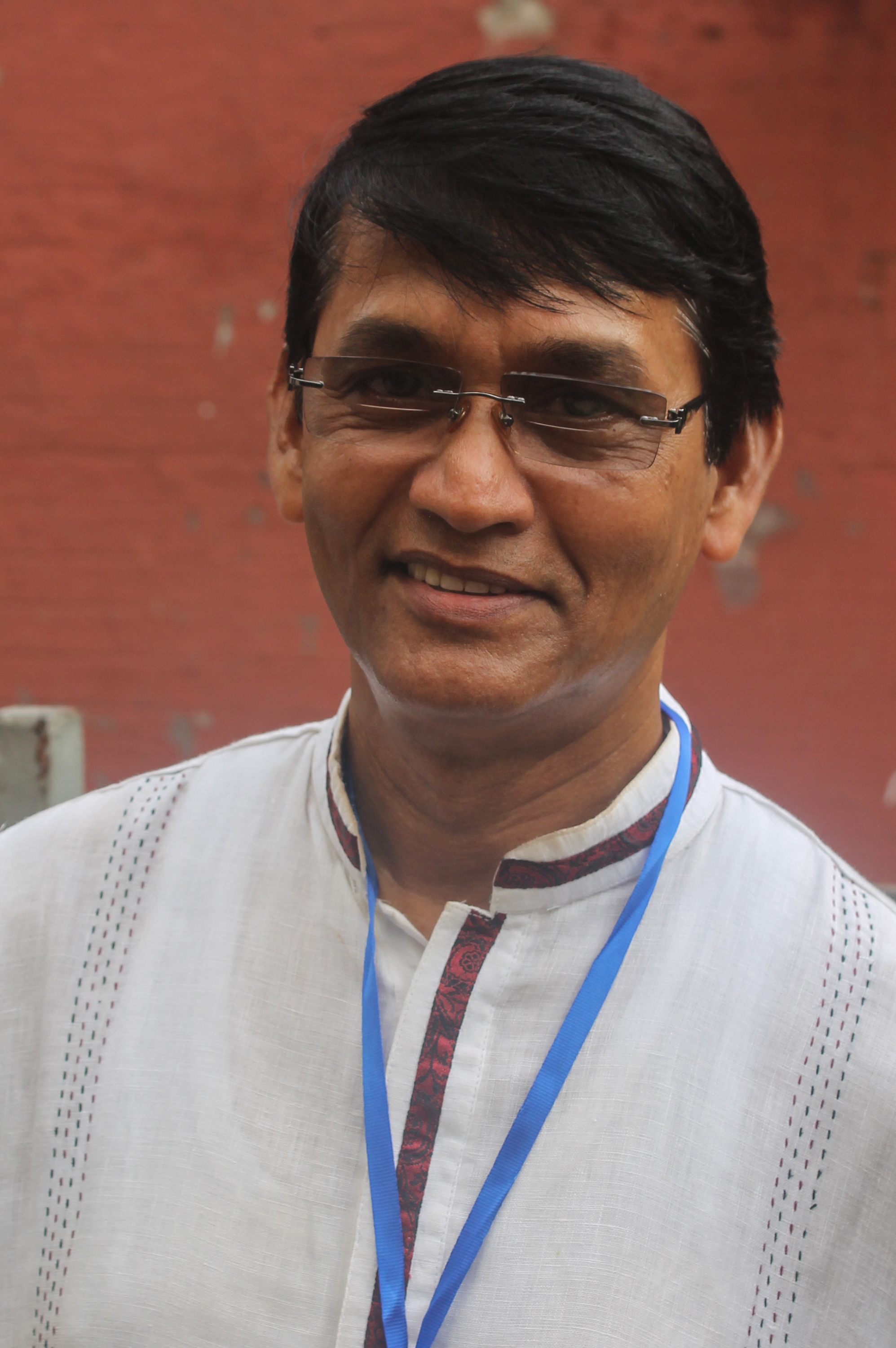
- Aziz in Dhaka (2018)
- Born: 15 May 1959 (age 67); Luterchar, Meghna, Comilla District, Bangladesh
- Education: University of Dhaka (MA in political science)
- Occupations: Television actor, director
- Years active: 1981–present
- Spouse: Zeenat Hakim (m. 1993)

Azizul Hakim (born 15 May 1959) is a Bangladeshi television, film and stage actor.

== Early life ==
Azizul Hakim was born in Comilla District to Md. Abdul Hakim, an engineer and Mohijunnesa. He joined the "Aranyak" theatre group from his student life.

== Career ==
Aziz started his theatre career with the theatre group "Aranyak" in 1977. His first acted theatre play was Ora Kodom Ali. He then acted in Ora Ache Bolei, Iblish, Nankar Pala, Ginipig, Somotot, Coriolenus of "Aranyak" theatre group. His other notable theatre play were Payer Aoaj Shona Jay, Lok Soman Lok of "ITI", Talpatar Sepai of "Dhaka Podatik" theatre group, Shokuntola of "Dhaka Theatre", Songsoder Maa of "Padatik Natyadal", Agunmukha and Kirtonkhola. His last acted theatre play was Joyjoyonti. He became irregular in theatre after 1998 and concentrated on television. He started his television career acting in small roles in 1980s. His directorial debut on television was Ja Hariye Jay and on theatre was Pathor.

Aziz received his breakthrough as a television actor in 1981 with BTV's Akhaney Nongor. He then performed as Oli in the television drama serial Kon Kanoner Phul, directed by Fazrul Abedin Dulal and written by Imdadul Haq Milan. He debuted in directing mega-serial through Jol Porey Pata Norey (2005), written by his wife Zeenat.

Aziz debuted acting in film by the role of Mojnu in Mustafizur Rahman's Shonkhonil Karagar (1992), written by Humayun Ahmed. He later acted in Joyjatra (2004).

In February 2022, his first web film Redrum directed by Vicky Zahed premiered on Chorki.

== Criticism ==
Azizul Hakim took a stand for the government during the repression of the dictatorship Awami League government on the students in the quota reform movement that took place in 2024. During the movement, a group of pro-autocracy Awami artists, including Azizul Hakim, were active against the movement in a WhatsApp group called "Alo Ashbei" led by actor Ferdous. After the non-cooperation movement, on September 3, 2024, some screenshots related to that WhatsApp group were spread on social media.

In April 2025, a murder case was filed against Hakim and 16 other actors over the death of a protester in Vatara during the Anti-Discrimination Student Movement against the Awami League government led by Prime Minister Sheikh Hasina.

== Works ==
=== Actor in television dramas ===
Year	Title	Playwright & Director	Co-stars	Aired on	Note
1981	Ekhane Nongor			BTV	debut drama
	Sundori				
	Kon Kanoner Phul				
	Somoy Oshomoy				
	Ithi Tomar Ami		Afsana Mimi		
	Tumi Ashbe Bole		Ratri		
	Priya		Shomi Kaiser, Tauquir Ahmed		
	Ke Kar Olongkar		Ratri		
	Priyo Bandhobi		Aruna Biswas		
	Putro Daay		Shomi Kaiser, Zahid Hasan, Shahiduzzaman Selim		
	Phire Ashe Brihoshpoti		Tania Ahmed		
	Shondhan		Ratri		
	Ditiyo Shotto		Tania Ahmed		
	Otochho Ekhon Duhshomoy		Tania Ahmed		
	Shonali Shondhay		Ratri		
	Eka		Tania Ahmed, Mita Noor, Bulbul, Abdul Kader		
	Kamini O Keya		Tonima Hamid		
	Kothay Shejon		Shomi Kaiser (double role), Bulbul Ahmed		
2010	Tomato Catch-up			ATN Bangla	TV serial, aired on Tuesday
2010	Kothay Pabo Tare			ATN Bangla	TV serial, aired on Tuesday
2010	Jamai Mel a		Dr. Enamul Haque		
2011	Red Dragon to Rojonigondha		Fazlur Rahman Babu, AKM Hasan, Mim, Nowshin	ATN Bangla	TV serial
2011	Roopkotha	Aranya Anwar	Naushaba, Ishita	ntv	TV serial
2011	Haat-er Rekha Kotha Boley				
2011	Ei Tho Jibon				
2011	All Rounder				
2012	Aaral	Shamim Ferdous; Tariqul Islam	Farjana Chumki, Shams Sumon	Channel i	TV play, based on the novel of Imdadul Haq Milon
2012	Panku Club	Hashim Rony; Anis Rahman	Farzana Chhoby, Shanjib Ahmed, AKM Hasan		single episode TV play, aired on Eid
2012	Korta Kahini		Zahid Hasan		
2012	To To Company	Zahid Hasan			
2013	Matbor	Sazzad Noor Sumon	Runa Khan, Chanchal Chowdhury		
2013	DB	Shahiduzzaman Selim	Farjana Chhobi, DA Tayeb, Ahsan Habib Nasim		TV serial
2013	Biltu Mama	Mazharul Haque Pintu; Abul Hossain Khokon	Shahdat Hossain, Shoshi, Faiyaz	Maasranga Television	children thriller, based on Kaizer Chowdhury's novel
2014	Gabbar Singh	Mamunur Rashid; Debashish Barua Dip	Babu, Salauddin Lavlu		
2014	Genduchora				TV play, aired on Eid
2014	Jol Phoringer Gaan	Anjan Aich			
2014	Songsar Simante	Amirul Islam			
2014	Prothom Prem	Fahim Sarker			
2014	Udor Pindi Budhor Ghare	Shotirtho Rahman			
2014	Bhalobasai Jothesto Noy	Mamunur Rashid (both)	Golam Farida Chhonda, Sharmin Shoshi		package drama
2015	Golpo Othoba Jibon	Zinat Hakim; Azizul Hakim	Humaiyra Himu		telefilm
2015	Noashal	Mir Sabbir	Mir Sabbir		TV serial

=== Director in television dramas ===
Year	Title	Playwright	Stars	Aired on	Note
2008	Shey Amaye Bhalobashey Na				26-episode TV serial
2011	Tobu O Rangdhonu				single-episode TV play, aired on Eid-ul-Fitr
2011	Shokal Shondhya Raat	Zinat Hakim	Shahed, Mim, Golam Farida Chhonda		52-episode TV serial
2013	Nij Grihe Porobashi	Zinat Hakim	Arman Parvez Murad, Agun, Tanvin Swity, Golam Farida Chhonda	Banglavision	TV serial, aired every Sunday and Monday
2015	Golpo Othoba Jibon	Zinat Hakim	Humaiyra Himu		telefilm

=== Films ===
Year	Title	Director	Co-Artist	Notes	Ref
1992	Shonkhonil Karagar				
1993	Padma Nadir Majhi				
2004	Joyjatra				
2022	Golui				
2022	Mujib: The Making of a Nation				
2024	Deyaler Desh	Mishuk Moni			

=== Host in television programs ===
- Celebrity show Lizan Shudhui Adda on Boishakhi TV in 2013
- Live show on Channel 71 in 2014 on his birthday
- Live show Aalap on Boishakhi TV in 2014 on his birthday
- Live show Citycell Tarokakathon on Channel i in 2014 on his birthday

== Awards and recognition ==
- Jay Jay Din Award (1994)
- Cultural Director Association Award (2001, 2002, 2003)
- Bangladesh Television Journalist Award (2002)
- Bangladesh Cultural Journalist Forum Award (2003)
- Bangla TV UK Ltd. Award (2004)

== Personal life ==
Azizul Hakim is married to screenwriter Zeenat Hakim since 1993. They have one daughter Nazah Hakim and one son Muhaimeen Hakim.
