= M Hamid =

- এম হামিদ

Director General of Bangladesh Television
- In office March 2012 – 2 April 2014
- Succeeded by: Abdul Mannan (acting)

Personal details
- Spouse: Falguni Hamid (m. 1978)
- Children: 2
- Relatives: K. M. Khalid (brother); Mahmud Sajjad (brother)
- Education: Jagannath College

M Hamid (Bengali: এম হামিদ) is a Bangladeshi dramatist and theatre personality. He served as the director general of Bangladesh Television from March 2012 until April 2014. He is a former chief executive officer of RTV, a Bangladeshi satellite television channel. He served as the founding president of the theatrical group Natyachakra.

Hamid was awarded 2018 Shilpakala Padak in dramatics by the government of Bangladesh.

== Early life ==
Hamid was a student of Jagannath College. He served as a Dhaka University Central Students' Union (DUCSU) cultural secretary. He debuted theatrical acting in the play Shurjamahal by Kalyan Mitra. He, along with his friends, established the theatrical group Natyachakra in September 1972. As of 2004, he had directed eight plays for Natyachakra.

== Career ==
Hamid worked at Bangladesh Television from 1980 until his retirement in 2006. He served as the director of National Institute of Mass-communication (NIMCO). In 2011, he joined as a managing director of Bangladesh Film Development Corporation (FDC) and went on to become its director general until he left the position in 2012.

Hamid served as the chairperson and president of Bangladesh Group Theatre Federation (BGTF). He was an executive member of Shammilito Shangskritik Jote (SSJ).

Hamid was awarded Badruddin Hossain Memorial Award by Padatik Natya Sangsad.

== Personal life ==
Hamid is married to Falguni Hamid (née Roy Chowdhury), a retired television and stage actress, since 24 December 1978. Together they have a daughter, Tonima Hamid.

Among Hamid's five brothers, K. M. Khalid is a former State Minister of Cultural Affairs and actor Mahmud Sajjad (d. 2021).
