= Cheleti Abol Tabol Meyeti Pagol Pagol =

Bangladeshi romantic thriller film

- Movie poster
- Directed by: Saif Chandan
- Written by: Saif Chandan
- Produced by: Shamim Alam
- Starring: Kayes Arju; Airin Sultana; Shahed Sharif Khan; Rifat Jahan; Sabina Rima
- Cinematography: Ridoy Sarkar
- Edited by: Mohammad Farhad Ahmed; Sobuj Khan
- Production company: Neel Nokkhotro Entertainment
- Distributed by: Neel Nokkhotro Entertainment
- Release date: 9 October 2015
- Country: Bangladesh
- Language: Bengali

Cheleti Abol Tabol Meyeti Pagol Pagol (Bengali: ছেলেটি আবোল তাবোল মেয়েটি পাগল পাগল) is a 2015 Bangladeshi romantic thriller film directed by Saif Chandan and produced by Neel Nokkhotro Entertainment. The film stars Kayes Arju and Airin Sultana in the lead roles.

== Cast ==
- Kayes Arju as Rahul
- Airin Sultana as Tuni
- Shahed Sharif Khan as Rudro
- Nishat Zarin Orin
- Sabina Rima
- Mukit Zakaria
- Monira Mithu
- Kochi Khandokar
- Pavel Islam
- Lipika Ahmed Mazumder
- Ayon Chowdhury
- Bishal Boshir
- Lutfor Rahaman
- Rafa Naim
- Puthi Ahmed (in item song maggie noodles)

== Production ==
Shooting started from February 2013.

The film opened on 9 October 2015 across more than 50 theatres. Audience numbers were underwhelming.

== Soundtracks ==
Cheleti Abol Tabol Meyeti Pagol Pagol Soundtrack
No.	Title	Singer(s)	Length
1.	"Arale"	Kishore Das	2:22
2.	"Therapy"	Protik Hasan	2:07
3.	"Darling"	Liza & Tausif	1:43
4.	"Sukh Pakhi"	Kumar Bishwajit, Porshi	2:12
5.	"Abol Tabol"	Arfin Rumey, Naumi	2:24
Total length:			10:47

== See also ==
- List of Bangladeshi films of 2014
