= Shonibar Bikel =

2019 drama film

- Film poster
- Directed by: Mostofa Sarwar Farooki
- Written by: Mostofa Sarwar Farooki
- Produced by: Abdul Aziz; Mostofa Sarwar Farooki
- Starring: Zahid Hasan; Nusrat Imroz Tisha; Parambrato Chatterjee; Iresh Zaker; Eyad Hourani; Selina Black
- Cinematography: Aziz Zhambakiev
- Music by: Pavel Areen
- Production companies: Jaaz Multimedia; Chabial; Tandem Productions
- Release date: April 2019 (MIFF)
- Running time: 83 minutes
- Countries: Bangladesh; Germany; Russia
- Languages: Bengali; English

Shonibar Bikel (lit. 'Saturday afternoon') is a 2019 political thriller drama film directed by Mostofa Sarwar Farooki, a one shot political thriller, inspired from the July 2016 Dhaka attack. The film had its world premiere at the 2019 Moscow International Film Festival. The film was cleared for release in Bangladesh by Bangladesh Film Censor Board after 4 years.

== Plot ==
On a nice Saturday afternoon during Ramadan, citizens enjoy a sleepy day time. Suddenly, a group of terrorists take over a café in the city holding hostages of employees and customers. The police soon surround the building and demand negotiation and surrenders but the terrorists fortify the café with gas cylinders continuing their unfair tribunal. Foreigners, the disabled, women, businessmen, artists, non-Muslims, and even Muslims with different sect are subject to brutal hostility. The media streaming live news to attract more viewers doesn't care for the safety of the hostages. Each time a hostage is executed one by one, the nightmare of violence is amplified.

== Cast ==
- Zahid Hasan
- Nusrat Imrose Tisha
- Mamunur Rashid
- Iresh Zaker
- Intekhab Dinar
- Nader Chowdhury
- Gousul Alam Shaon
- Parambrata Chatterjee
- Eyad Hourani
- Selina Black
- Ellie Poussot
- Manoj Pramanik

== Release ==
=== Screening ===
The film was premiered in 41st Moscow International Film Festival in April 2019. Then it was screened for Sydney Film Festival in June 2019 in Australia. In July 2019, it was screened for Filmfest München and London Indian Film Festival. It became a nominee for CineCo Pro Award. It was screened as official Selection in Busan International Film Festival in October 2019. It was also screened in 2019 Hong Kong Asian Film Festival.

=== Home media ===
The film was digitally premiered in India and Singapore through SonyLIV from 7 July 2023.

=== Controversy and censorship ===
In January 2019, the Film Censor Board of Bangladesh banned the theatrical release of Saturday Afternoon which portrays the July 2016 terrorist attack at the Holey Artisan Bakery as it would "damage the country's reputation". The censor board said that the film could "incite religious fervour in the Muslim-majority nation of 165 million". In January, 2021, a group of artists led by Farooki protested by many ways against the decision. In August, 2022, netizens of Bangladesh protested online against the ban. On 26 August 2022, a group of filmmakers and artists demanded clear explanation for ban the film. On 28 August 2022, a television drama directors' organisation named Director's Guild protested against government and demanded censor clearance of the film. On 29 August 2022, Hasan Mahmud, the information minister of the country, expressed the decision to give permission to release the film under the condition that the director should add extra scenes advised by appeal board. He also claimed that the film didn't show the whole fact. In October 2022, Farooki said that some dialogues may be added to the film's ending to get clearance from the Censor Board. On 21 January 2023, it got green signal of the appeal board to release theatrically in the Bangladesh market.

== Reception ==
=== Critical response ===
Deborah Young of The Hollywood Reporter said about the film, "As in most films that attempt to do everything in a one-shot single take, viewers soon forget technique in the heat of the evolving story. It doesn't seem to faze either the professional cast or cinematographer Aziz Zhambakiyev (Harmony Lessons), as Valerii Petrov's Steadicam goes flying around the airy restaurant with its picture windows onto a police stakeout and walls that seem to change color from blue to red to heighten the drama". Calling it a modernised version of The Petrified Forest, Wally Adams of EasternKicks praised performance of its actors.

=== Accolades ===
List of awards and nominations
Organization	Year	Category	Recipients & nominees	Result	Ref.(s)
Moscow International Film Festival	2019	Kommersant Prize		Won	
Moscow International Film Festival	2019	Russian Federation of Film Critics Jury Prize		Won	
Vesoul International Film Festival of Asian Cinema	2020	NETPAC Award		Won	
Vesoul International Film Festival of Asian Cinema	2020	High School Jury Award		Won	
Fukuoka International Film Festival	2020	Kumamoto City Award		Won	
