= S. M. Mohsin =

Bangladeshi stage and television actor (1948–2021)

- এস এম মহসীন
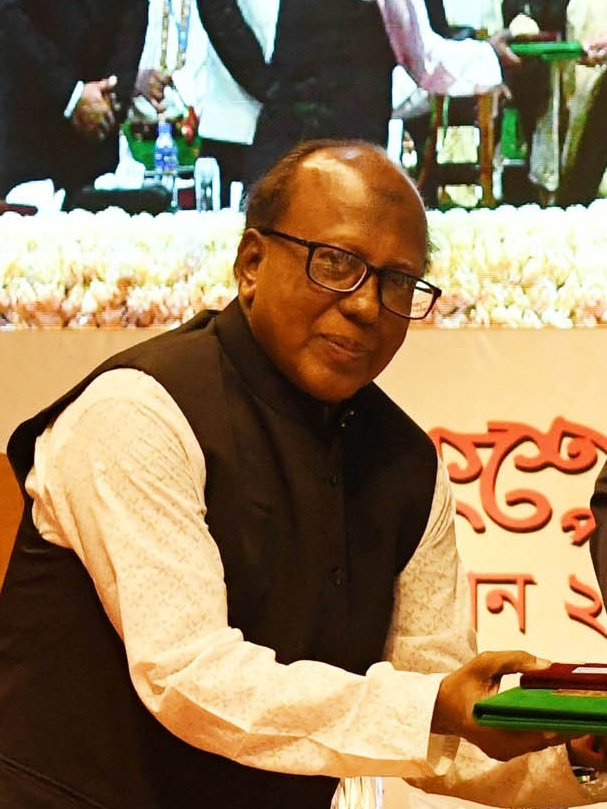
- S. M. Mohsin in 2020.
- Born: 30 January 1948
- Died: 18 April 2021 (aged 73); Dhaka, Bangladesh
- Education: University of Dhaka
- Occupations: Actor, academic
- Awards: full list

S. M. Mohsin (30 January 1948 – 18 April 2021) was a Bangladeshi stage and television actor. He became an honorary fellow of the Bangla Academy in 2018. In 2020, he was awarded Ekushey Padak by the Government of Bangladesh for his contribution to acting.

== Education and career ==
Mohsin originated from Tangail District. He completed his bachelor's in Bangla and journalism from the University of Dhaka.

Mohsin worked as a faculty member of Drama and Dramatics Department at Jahangirnagar University, an acting director general of Bangladesh Shilpakala Academy and the first project director of National Theatre.

Mohsin acted in Roktey Bheja Shapla, a play directed by Atiqul Haque Chowdhury, and Kobor and Chithi by Munier Chowdhury. He debuted his first radio play in Padakkhep.

Mohsin performed with the theatre troupe Drama Circle.

== Works ==
Theatre plays

- Dipantor
- Kobor
- Subochon Nirbashon
- Chup Adalat Cholchhey

Television serial plays

- Mohor Ali
- Sakin Sarisuri
- Gorom Bhat Othoba Nichhok Bhuter Golpo
- Nilambori

Films

- Agamikal (2022)
- Antaratma (2025) posthumous released

== Awards ==
- Meril Prothom Alo Award for Best Television Actor (2007)
- Shilpakala Padak (2017)
- Bangla Academy Fellowship (2018)
- Ekushey Padak (2020)

== Personal life ==
Mohsin had two sons - Rezwan Mohsin and Rashek Mohsin.

Mohsin died on 18 April 2021, of complications from COVID-19, at BIRDEM hospital.
