= 41st Moscow International Film Festival =

Film festival

- Location: Moscow
- Founded: 1959
- Awards: Golden George
- Festival date: 18–25 April 2019
- Website: https://www.moscowfilmfestival.ru

The 41st Moscow International Film Festival was held from 18 April to 25 April 2019.

Russian film director Nikita Mikhalkov was the president of the festival. South Korean film director Kim Ki-Duk was head of the main jury. The Emperor of Paris was the opening film and Meeting Gorbachev was the closing film. The opening ceremony took place at the Rossiya theatre, hosted by actress Elizaveta Boyarskaya. The closing ceremony took place at the Rossiya cinema, hosted by actress Marina Alexandrova. The Golden Saint George for best picture was awarded to the Kazakh film The Secret of a Leader directed by Farkhat Sharipov.

== Jury ==
Main Competition

- Kim Ki-Duk, film director (South Korea) – President of the Jury
- Semih Kaplanoglu, film director & producer (Turkey)
- Valia Santella, film director & screenwriter (Italy)
- Maria Jävenhelmi, film actress (Finland)
- Irina Apeksimova, film actress (Russia)

Documentary Competition

- Kevin Sim, film director (UK) – President of the Jury
- Boris Karadzhev, film director (Russia)
- Gulbara Tolomushova, film historian (Kyrgyzstan)

Short film competition

- Alisa Khazanova, film actress and director (Russia) - Chairman of the Jury
- Heidi Zwicker, Sundance festival programmer (U.S.)
- Ognjen Glavonic, film director (Serbia)

== Films in competition ==
Main Competition

English title	Original title	Director(s)	Production country
In Search of Echo	Háiyáng dòngwù (海洋动物)	Zhang Chi	China
Jam	Jam	SABU	Japan
Laughing	Ride	Valerio Mastandrea	Italy
My Polish Honeymoon	Lune de Miel	Elize Otzenberger	France
My Second Year in College	Sal-e Dovvom-e Danehkadeh Man	Rasoul Sadrameli	Iran
Saturday Afternoon	Shonibar Bikel	Mostofa Sarwar Farooki	Bangladesh, Germany
Sunday	Voskreseniye	Svetlana Proskurina	Russia
The Mover	Tēvs Nakts	Dāvis Sīmanis	Latvia, Germany
The Secret of a Leader	The Secret of a Leader	Farkhat Sharipov	Kazakhstan
The Sun Above Me Never Sets	Min Urduber Kyun Khahan Da Kiirbet	Lybov Borisova	Russia
Trap	Kapan	Seyid Çolak	Turkey
Void	Tyhjiö	Aleksi Salmenperä	Finland
Vongozero: The Outbreak	Epidemiya. Vongozero	Pavel Kostomarov	Russia

Documentary Competition

English title	Original title	Director(s)	Production country
Anatoly Krupnov. He Was	Anatoly Krupnov. He Was	Datrya Ivankova	Russia
Busy Inside	Busy Inside	Olga Lvoff	U.S.
Earth	Erde	Nikolaus Geyrhalter	Austria
In Search of Greatness	In Search of Greatness	Gabe Polsky	U.S.
Men's Room	For Vi Er Gutta	Petter Sommer, Jo Vemund Svendsen	Norway
Patrimonium	Patrimonium	Carl Olsson	Denmark
Winter's Yearning	Håbets Ø	Sidse Torstholm Larsen, Sturla Pilskog	Norway, Greenland, Denmark

== Awards ==
- Golden Saint George for Best Film: The Secret of a Leader by Farkhat Sharipov, Kazakhstan
- Silver Saint George Special Jury Prize: In Search of Echo (Háiyáng dòngwù) by Zhang Chi, China
- Silver Saint George for Best Director: Valerio Mastandrea, Laughing, Italy
- Silver Saint George for Best Actor: Tommi Korpela, Void, Finland
- Silver Saint George for Best Actress: Soha Niasti, My Second Year in College, Iran
- Silver Saint George for Best Documentary: Men's Room (For Vi Er Gutta) by Petter Sommer & Jo Vemund Svendsen, Norway
- Silver Saint George for Best Short Film: Tiger (Tigre) by Delphine Deloget, France
- FIPRESCI jury prize: Lune de Miel (My Polish Honeymoon) by Elise Otsenberger, France
- NETPAC jury prize: Min Urduber Kyun Khahan Da Kiirbet (The Sun Above Me Never Sets) by Lybov Borisova, Russia
- The Russian film critics' awards
  - Jam, by SABU, Japan
  - Tyhjiö (Void), by Aleksi Salmenperä, Finland,
  - Shonibar Bikel (Saturday Afternoon), by Mostofa Sarwar Farooki, Bangladesh
  - To Plant a Flag, by Bobbie Peers, Norway (short film)
- Russian Cinema Club club federation awards
  - Tēvs Nakts (The Mover), by Dāvis Sīmanis, Latvia, Germany
  - Core of the World, by Natalya Mechshaninova, (Russian program)
  - Voskreseniye (Sunday), by Svetlana Proskurina, Russia (diploma)
- Audience Award: Min Urduber Kyun Khahan Da Kiirbet (The Sun Above Me Never Sets) by Lybov Borisova, Russia
- 'Kommersant Weekend' weekly's prize: Shonibar Bikel (Saturday Afternoon), by Mostofa Sarwar Farooki, Bangladesh
- Audience Award from the festival's official online cinema, OKKO: In Search of Greatness, by Gabe Polsky, U.S.
- Honorary prize for outstanding contribution in the world cinema: Kim Ki-duk (South Korea)
- Special Prize for the outstanding achievement in the career of acting and devotion to the principles of K. Stanislavsky's school: Ralph Fiennes
