= Tania Ahmed =

Bangladeshi actor

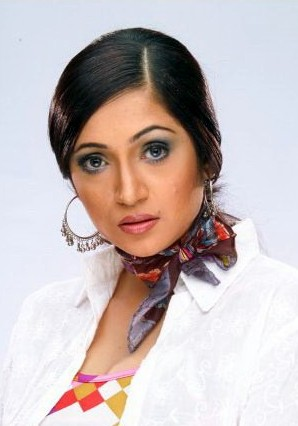
- Ahmed in 2011
- Born: June 5, 1972 (age 54)
- Occupations: Actress, model, choreographer, director
- Years active: 1991-present
- Spouse: S I Tutul (m. 1999–2021)
- Children: Tawab • Sreyash • Arosh
- Relatives: Sohel Rana (uncle)

Tania Ahmed (born 5 June 1972) is a Bangladeshi actress, model, choreographer and director. She won Bangladesh National Film Award for Best Supporting Actress for her role in the film Krishnopokkho (2016).

== Career ==
Ahmed started her career as a model in 1991. She debuted her acting career in the TV play Samporko, directed by Faria Hossain. Later on, she played in other notable TV dramas - 69, Belabhumi, Srikanto, Amader Anandabari, Ghunpoka and Shukhnagar Apartment. Ahmed has also directed music videos since 1999.

=== 2001–2005 ===
She directed music video of "Muhurto", "Moyuree", "Aar Koto Kandabe", and "Uro Megh". In 2004, she acted in Humayun Ahmed's film Shyamol Chhaya and earned Bachsas Film Award for Best Supporting Actress for her role in the movie.

=== 2006–2010 ===
She has acted in Mostofa Sarwar Farooki's Made in Bangladesh and in a short film Biswaronner Nodi.

=== 2011–2018 ===
She became the judge of Veet Channel i Top Model in 2011. She directed a serial named A Team in 2012 in England and telecasted on Channel-i in 2013. In 2014, Ahmed debuted in directorial role in the movie Valobasha Emoni Hoy (Good Morning London) released in January 2017.

== Personal life ==
She was married to musician S I Tutul since 1999. The couple officially divorced on 2021. Together they have three sons - Tawab, Sreyash and Arosh. Her son's are 36, 26, and 16 years old.

== Television works ==
Year	Title of Drama	Director & Playwright	Co-stars	Aired on	Notes & Source
1992	Samparko	Faria Hossain	Zahid Hasan, Abida Ali	Bangladesh Television	Hit song: Tumi Amar Prothom Shokal; Singer: Topon Choudhury & Shakila Zafar
	Manush Chena Daay	Kobir Anwar	Zahid Hasan		
1995	Bhalobasar Ontorale		Tony Dias		
	Belabhumi				
	Srikanto				
	Amader Anandabari		Shahed		
	Ghunpoka				
	Ekhon Duhsomoy		Azizul Hakim		
	Shukhnagar Apartment				
	Iblish		Zahid Hasan		
	Ghar Tera		Mir Sabbir		
	Bakatta		Azizul Hakim, Bijori Barkatullah		
	Ebong Tarpor		Mahfuz Ahmed		
	Putrodaan		Azizul Hakim, Bijori Barkatullah, Shahiduzzaman Selim		
	Fire Ase Brihospoti		Azizul Hakim, Abdul Kader		
	Shodh Bodh		Zahid Hasan, Mahfuz Ahmed, Tarin Ahmed		
	Alta Ranga Mon		Azizul Hakim		
	Miss Call		Monir Khan Shimul, Ali Zaker		
2004	Ronger Manush	Salauddin Lavlu & Masum Reza	ATM Shamsuzzaman, Fazlur Rahman Babu	NTV	
2005	Shyamol Chhaya		Humayun Faridi, Shimul, Riaz, Shaon		
	Ja Hariye Jay		Zahid Hasan, Afsana Mimi		Serial Natok
	Ektu Bhalobashar Jonno		Shubhon		
	Shurobi		Mahfuz Ahmed		
	Chuto Chuto Deu		Nobel, Zahid, Shimul, Towkir		
	Bristir Kanna		Azizul Hakim, Mahfuz Ahmed		
	Osrutho Shonglap		Golam Mustafa		
	Binimoye Tumi		Shubhon		
	Shohojatri		Nader Chowdhury		
	Bristir Chokhe Jol		Tony Dais, Shomi Kaiser		
	Madhuri O Onnanyo		Khaled Khan		
	Britto Periye Deyal		Azizul Hakim		
	Je Jar Bhumikay		Tauquir Ahmed		
	Hridoyer Kachche		Tony Dais, Toru Mostafa		
	Naa		Azizul Hakim, Tony, Sweety		Drama Serial
	Ditiyo Shotto		Azizul Hakim		
	Otocho Ekhon Duhshomoy		Azizul Hakim		
	Birpurush Boshikoron		Zahid Hasan, Richi, Shimul, Abul Hayat, A Kader		
	Manush Namer Nodi		Khaled Khan, Zahid Hasan		
	Ronger Manush	Salahuddin Lavlu			
	Andhokarer Mukh	Faria Hossain	Shuvon		
	Montro Dilam Praner		Afzal Hussain		
	Loov		A Hakim, Mahfuz A, Bijori, A Kader		
	Seku Sikander		Saidul Anam Tutul		
2006	Saapludu	Saiful Islam Mannu	Munira Yusuff Memi	Bangladesh Television	TV serial, in a negative role
2011	Prottaborton	Sanowar			TV serial, in a negative role
2011	Terminal	Shokal Ahmed		ntv	TV serial
2012	Apon Por	Ripon Nobi			TV serial
2012	Mayajaal	Himel Ashraf'			TV serial
2012	Putul Khela	Masud Sezan		ATN Bangla	TV serial
2012	Rupkotha	Aranya Anwar		ntv	TV serial
2012	Shokal Shondhya Raat	Azizul Hakim		Channel i	TV serial
2012	Sikandar Box Ekhon Birat Model	Sagor Jahan (both)	Mosharraf Karim, Faruk Ahmed, Joyraaj	Banglavision	six-episode TV serial, aired on Eid
2013	Sikandar Box Cox's Bazar-e	Sagor Jahan (both)	Mosharraf Karim, Faruk Ahmed, Joyraaj	Banglavision	six-episode TV serial, aired on Eid
2015	Bakharkhani	Tuhin Rasel; Tanim Parvez	Shahiduzzaman Selim, Shaju Khadem, Aparna Ghosh	Desh TV	a weeklong mini TV Series, aired on Eid-ul-Fitr
2015	Ekdin Chhuti Hobe	Faruq Ahmed; Himel Ashraf	Shahiduzzaman Selim, Chanchal, Pran Raoy, Nowshin, Urmila	ntv	TV Serial
2015	Superstar	Rayhan Khan (both)	Tauquir Ahmed, Mehazabien, Nayeem, Toya	Maasranga Television	TV serial, airs every Sunday to Wednesday; S I Tutul, Samina, Nancy, & Naomi sang for the serial
2015	Sikandar Boksh Ekhon Nij Gram-e	Sagor Jahan (both)	Mosharraf, Shokh, Farukh Ahmed, AKM Hasan	Banglavision	six-episode TV serial, aired on Eid-ul-Adha

=== Directed dramas ===
Year	Title	Playwright	Co-stars	Aired on	Notes & Source
	A Team	Masud Sezan	Mosharraf Karim, Bijori Barkatullah, S I Tutul, Tania Ahmed, Saju Muntasir, Kazi Riton		

=== Web series ===
Year	Title	OTT	Character	Co-Artist	Director
2023	Buker Moddhye Agun	Hoichoi		Ziaul Faruq Apurba, Yash Rohan	Taneem Rahman Angshu

== Awards ==
Bachsas Film Award

- Best Supporting Actress for Shyamol Chhaya in 2004
