= Phalguni =

Phalguni (Sanskrit for "reddish, red") may be:

- Phalguni river, river in Karnataka, India
- an asterism and lunar mansion in traditional Hindu astronomy and astrology, see Nakshatra#List of Nakshatras
- Phalguni Pathak, Indian singer

== See also ==
- Falguni (disambiguation)
- Phalguna, a month of the Hindu calendar (February-March)
