= Antaratma =

2025 Bangladeshi film directed by Wajed Ali Sumon

- Poster
- Directed by: Wajed Ali Sumon
- Screenplay by: Wajed Ali Sumon
- Story by: Sohani Hossain
- Produced by: Sohani Hossain
- Starring: Shakib Khan; Darshana Banik; Shahed Sharif Khan; Jhuna Chowdhury; Aruna Biswas
- Cinematography: Farhad Sardar
- Edited by: Mostakim Sujan
- Music by: Lincon Roy Chowdhury; Indradeep Dasgupta
- Production company: Taranga Entertainment
- Distributed by: Action Cut Entertainment
- Release date: March 31, 2025
- Running time: 135 Minutes
- Country: Bangladesh
- Language: Bengali

Antaratma (Bengali: অন্তরাত্মা, transl. Soul) is a 2025 Bangladeshi romantic family drama film. The film is directed by Wajed Ali Sumon and produced by Sohani Hossain under the banner of her Taranga Entertainment. It features Shakib Khan and Darshana Banik in the lead roles. The film marked the second collaboration between Sohani Hossain and Shakib Khan after the huge success of Swatta (2017) and the second collaboration between Shahed Sharif Khan and Shakib Khan after the 2004 film Hridoy Shudhu Tomar Jonno.

The film released on the occasion of Eid-ul-Fitr 2025.

== Synopsis ==
A boy is very lonely. He has no one on earth. There are others, who do not want to understand him. His lover also does not understand his mind. The life of a boy named Prothom is very difficult. There is no such thing as a lack of wealth, starting from the palace of Prothom, who lived a life of gloomy life, clinging to algae on the shelf of sorrow. There are only cries for love. Once upon a time, Prothom, who was poor in love, found another life. It can be called a dark world.

== Cast ==
- Shakib Khan as Prothom
- Darshana Banik as Rupkotha
- Shahed Sharif Khan as Zaker
- Jhuna Chowdhury
- Aruna Biswas
- SM Mohsin
- Maruf Khan

== Production ==
=== Casting ===
On February 16, 2021, Indian actress Darshana Banik was contracted to play the lead role in the film. The next day, on February 18, Shakib Khan signed a contract with production company Tarang Entertainment for the lead role, later on the same day, the official announcement of the production of the film and the name of the lead actress Darshana Banik were revealed. Later, on February 28, 2021, actor Shahed Sharif Khan signed on for the role of Zaker in the film, where he will play antagonist.

=== Filming ===
The film was originally scheduled to be shot on March 1, 2021, but was postponed to March 6, 2021, due to some complications. Then on March 5, 2021, the crews of the film went to Pabna, Bangladesh for filming and the Muhurta of the film was held at Ratnadwip Resort in Pabna that night. The next day, on March 6, the film's principal photography officially began at the Ratnadwip Resort in Pabna, with the participation of lead actor Shakib Khan and Shahed Sharif Khan and other crews. Then on March 7, Shakib Khan posted a new look on his Facebook and Instagram accounts, which went viral on the internet and was appreciated by critics and audiences. Also on March 11, lead actress Darshana Banik participated in the filming. On April 4, 2021, Shakib Khan finished filming his own part, then he returned to Dhaka from Pabna on April 5. The shooting of the film was completed on April 7, 2021. The film's director Wajed Ali Sumon told The Daily Star that, "The post-production of the film is taking place in India. If the (COVID-19) pandemic is within control, the film will be released on the coming Eid-ul-Fitr."

On April 4, 2021, Shakib Khan was injured in the left eye by actress Darshana Banik's fingernail while filming a romantic song sequence. After treatment, he went to rest at Ratnadeep Resort. The filming of the film was suspended.

== Music ==
Antaratma

Soundtrack album by Indraadip Dasgupta
- Released: 2025
- Recorded: June 2021
- Studio: Tarango Entertainment
- Genre: Feature Film Soundtrack
- Length: 11:59
- Language: Bengali

Singles from Antaratma
- 1. "Antaratma (title song)" Released: 26 Mar 2025; 2. "Rakhi Jotne Saradin" Released: 28 Mar 2025; 3. "Eka Aarale" Released: 31 Mar 2025

Indraadip Dasgupta chronology
Shastri (2024)	Antaratma (2025)

In the mid-June 2021, Nazmun Munira Nancy recorded the first song of the film. She collaborated with Shakib Khan about 5 years after the 2016 film Bossgiri. Indian singer Samarjit Roy, who made his debut in Bangladesh, sang duet with her in the song titled "Rakhi Jotne Saradin". The song is written by Hritam Sen and composed and music arranged by Indradeep Dasgupta, winner of the National Film Award of India. On July 17, 2021, lyricist Robiul Islam Jibon informed with his a Facebook post that he had written two songs for the film, which will be composed by Indradeep Dasgupta also. He said that, the filming of these two songs with the demo version has already been done. In a few days, the artists will give voice to the songs.

All music is composed by Indradeep Dasgupta.

Track listing
No.	Title	Lyrics	Music	Singer(s)	Length
1.	"Antaratma (Title Track)"	Robiul Islam Jibon	Indradeep Dasgupta	Jubin Nautiyal	5:04
2.	"Rakhi Jotne Saradin"	Sohani hossain	Indradeep Dasgupta	Nazmun Munira Nancy, Samarjit Roy	3:25
3.	"Eka Aarale"	Robiul Islam Jibon	Indradeep Dasgupta	Pintu Kumar Ghosh; Nazmun Munira Nancy	3:30
Total length:					11:59

== Release ==
The film was initially scheduled to release on Eid al-Fitr in 2021. Subsequently, it was postponed due to the second wave of COVID-19 pandemic in Bangladesh. The film release date will be rescheduled, when the effects of the second wave of COVID-19 subside.

== Reception ==
=== Critical response ===
Fatema Tasnim of Haalfashion noted, Antaratma received positive reception for its storytelling, cinematography, and authentic 1980s period production design. Critics and audiences praised the lead actors' performances as well as the realistic character styling and costume design, which effectively captured the era's aesthetic.

Habibur Rahman Khan Arif of Bangla Movie Database, criticized Antaratma for its outdated and formulaic narrative, noting that the film felt obsolete even by standards of several years prior and highlighted weaknesses in the screenplay, editing, and technical execution, pointing out that despite Shakib Khan's star presence, the overall production suffered from predictable tropes, weak character development, and inconsistent direction.
