= Made in Bangladesh (2006 film) =

2006 Bangladeshi film

Mad_e in Bangladesh
- Movie poster
- Directed by: Mostofa Sarwar Farooki
- Starring: Zahid Hasan; Shahiduzzaman Selim; Tariq Anam Khan
- Release date: 1 December 2006
- Country: Bangladesh
- Language: Bangla

Made in Bangladesh is a Bangladeshi political satire film by Mostofa Sarwar Farooki released in 2006. The movie's release was delayed by a year because of opposition from Bangladesh Film Censor Board over the contents of the film.

== Plot ==
The film revolves around Khorshed Alam (the main protagonist) Who comes to Dhaka to find a better job after graduating his education but all his effort goes in vain to secure a job while being taunted by his uncle for not able to find a job and living under his roof. Frustrated by not getting a job despite multiple attempts, he hijacks a DC office and holds a hostage of variety of other political and government working people into the office by deceiving calls and what later the story follows as a satirical take on real life politics and corruptions and needing for a change in the country and give everyone a fair chance.

== Cast ==
- Zahid Hasan as Khorshed Alam
- Shahiduzzaman Selim as Nawshad
- Tariq Anam Khan as DC
- Srabosti Dutta Tinni
- Dilara Zaman
- Masud Ali Khan as SP Jahanagir
- Hasan Masood as ACP Bakul
- Marzuk Russell as Sadekur Rahman
- Fazlur Rahman Babu as Nazrul
- Tania Ahmed as Rowshana
- Minhajul Abedin as Shei Lok
- Jayanta Chattopadhyay as Mayor Haider Ali
- Nader Chowdhury as ADC General
- Amirul Haque Chowdhury as Giasuddin Ahmed
- Saleh Ahmed as Khademul Karim
- Shahidul Alam Sachchu
- Kachi Khandakar
- Rosey Siddiqui as Boudi
- D A Tayeb as a Police officer
- Redoan Rony
