= Anisul Huq =

Anisul Huq or Anisul Hoque (Arabic: انیس الحق) meaning "friend of the truth", is a Muslim male given name. Notable people with the name include:

- Anisul Haque Chowdhury (Rangpur politician) (died 2011), Bangladesh Awami League Member of Parliament
- Annisul Huq (1952–2017), Bangladeshi businessman and mayor of Dhaka North City Corporation
- Anisul Huq (politician) (born 1956), Bangladeshi politician and former Minister for Law, Justice and Parliamentary Affairs
- Anisul Hoque (born 1965), Bangladeshi writer
