= Moutushi Biswas =

Bangladeshi model and actress

- মৌটুসী বিশ্বাস
- Occupations: Actress, model
- Spouse: Palash Das (m. 2006)
- Children: 1

Moutushi Biswas is a Bangladeshi model and actress. She made her television debut in the program Adventure Bangladesh, aired in Ekushey Television Channel.

== Career ==
Biswas hosts the ATN Bangla television program "Shera Rondhon Shilpi 2017".

== Personal life ==
Biswas was born in Khulna and raised in Chittagong in a Hindu family. She married Palash Das on 12 December 2006. She gave birth to their only child, a daughter, in 2011.

== Works ==
=== Films ===
- Bachelor (2004)
- U-Turn (2015) as Toma
- Krishnopokkho (2016)

=== Television drama plays ===
- Ekannoborti
- Banoful (2005)
- Hadudu
- Ami Ke Bhulite Pari
- Ek Jhhaak Mrito Jonaki
- TV Poribar
- Pagla Hawa
- Joutho Sur
- Akashe Megh Nei
- Koshto Koshto Shukh
- Shongshoy
- Koshto Koshto Shukh
- Rater Golpo
- Aynaghor
- Circus
- Corporate
- Bhalobashar Chatushkon
- Oghoton Ghoton Potiyoshi
- Like & Comments
- Dugdugi

=== Web series ===
Year	Title	OTT	Character	Co-Artist	Director	Notes
2020	Boomerang	Binge	Runi	Abu Hurayra Tanvir	Wahid Tarek	
2021	Bou Diaries (Spotlight)	Bioscope		Ahmed Rubel	Sameer Ahmed	
