= Chayanika Chowdhury =

Bangladeshi television drama director

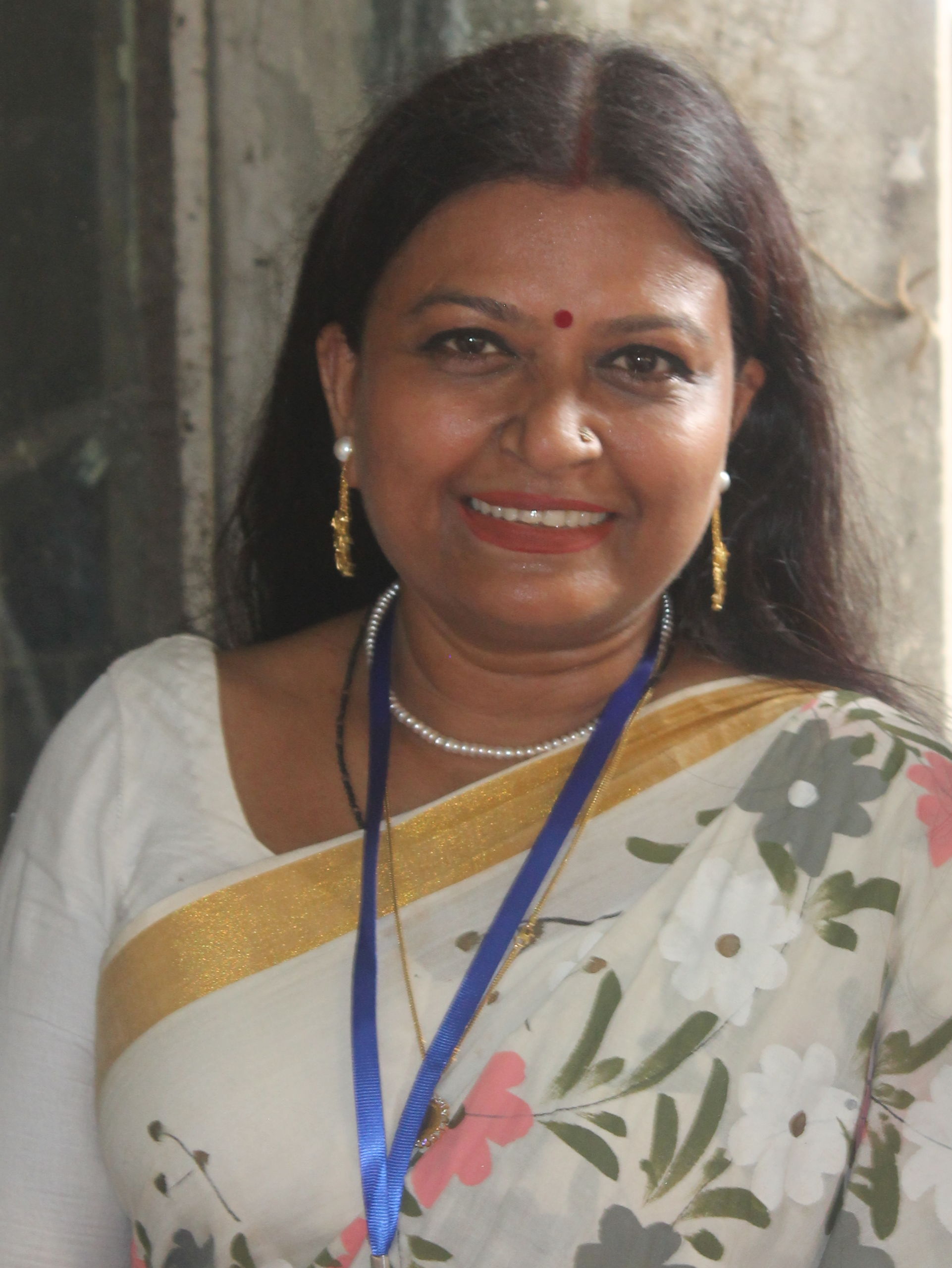
- Chayanika Chowdhury, Dhaka 2018
- Occupation: Director
- Years active: 2001–present
- Spouse: Arun Chowdhury (m. 1990)
- Relatives: Tamalika Karmakar (sister)

Chayanika Chowdhury (born 1 December) is a Bangladeshi television drama director. She has been directing television dramas since 2001, and as of September 2017, she has directed 347 dramas.

== Education ==
Chowdhury graduated from Chhayanaut Sangeet Biddayatan for Rabindra Sangeet and then went to Santiniketan.

== Career ==
Chowdhury debuted directing television dramas in 2001 with the drama Shesh Belay. She got her breakthrough through the drama titled Ek Jiboney, which aired on 28 October 2002.

Chowdhury's 50th directorial work was Maya, the 100th was Choloman Chhobi in 2010, the 200th was Juari in 2013, and the 300th was Sona'r Manush in 2016.

Chowdhury published her first book, Mayaghar, in 2014.

In 2019, Chowdhury made her directorial debut directing a film Bishwoshundori starring Siam Ahmed and Pori Moni.

In May 2025, an arrest warrant was issued against Chowdhury over a cheque dishonour case.

== Personal life ==
Chowdhury is married to Arun Chowdhury, a writer and journalist since 1990. They have a daughter, Anulekha. Her sister Tamalika Karmakar is a film and television actress.

== Awards ==
- Cultural Reporters Award as the Best Director (2003)
- Best Critic Award as the Best Director from Cultural Journalist Forum of Bangladesh (2004)
- Special Award from Charunirom Institute of Acting and Research (2010)

== Works ==
=== Television ===
Year	Title	Cast	Notes
	Chatushkon		
	Ek Jiboney	Shahed, Tamalika, Tazin	
	Bhalobashar Gaan		
	Kalo Chithi	Mahfuz, Afsana Mimi & Shomi Kaisar	
	Jara Brishtite Bhijechhilo		
	Opekkhar Brishti	Apurba, Richi	
	Babli Tomar Shongey		
	Dekha Holo Bhalobasha Bedonaey		
	Rupa		
	Shesh Belay		
	Ananda Bedona		
	Bhalobashi		
	Tomakey Chhuye		
	Chhotto ei Jibon		
	Pothey Pothey Choltey Choltey		
	Surjaster Agey		
	Pora Prem		
	Golmal		
	Maya	Apurba, Tanjin Tisha	
	Bikeler Alo		
	Haraye Khuji Tarey	Apurba, Richi	
	Neel Kuashaye		
	Ami Tumi Tinjoney		
	Nirbachito Dukkho Koshto		
	Jayga Shuddho Bari	Apurba, Richi	
	SMS		
	Shonar Kathi Rupar Kathi		
	Kashto Kashto Shukh		
	Dui Bon		
	Noshto Nir		
	Jekhane Shimanto		
	Anchol		
	Kotha Chhilo Onnorokom	Mahfuz, Apurba, Tain, Tomalika	
	Kotha Chhilo Onnorokom	Apurba, Mahfuz, Opee, Bonna Mirza	
	Esho Haat Dhoro	Apurba, Tarin	
	Locket	Afsana Mimi, Apurba	
	Alochhaya	Apurba, Richi, Diti, Hasan Imam	
	Aloker Ei Jhornadhara	Apurba, Tinni	
	Amar Chokhe Trishna	Apurba, Tinni	
	Ami Ebong Shet Payra	Apurba, Tarin, Dolly Johur	
	Bhalo Theko Bhalo Rekho	Apurba, Prova, Badhon	
	Maan Obhiman	Apurba, Opee	
	Ja Kichhu Chai E Jibone	Apurba, Opee	
	Meyetir Naam Kotha	Apurba, Opee, Minar	
	Jete Pari Kintu Keno Jabo	Apurba, Richi	
	Swapner Nil Pori	Apurba, Tinni	
	Bhalobashar Shuru	Apurba, Tinni	
	Khunjey Pawa	Apurba	
	Sayanhey	Apurba, Tinni	
	Chokkhe Aamar Trishna	Apurba, Tinni	
	Pakhir Danay Bhor	Apurba, Prova	
	Nupur	Apurba, Tarin, Diti	
	Ei Maya	Apurba, Tinni, Sharmili	
	Bhor Holo Dor Khulo	Apurba, Tania	
	Obhiman	Apurba, Nadia	
	Oporanhe/Obelay	Apurba, Kushum Shikder	
	Maya Ghor	Apurba	
	Sukher Byatha	Apurba, Richi	
	Boshontey Esho	Apurba, Richi, Shahin Khan, Bonnya Mirza	
	Shopno Ghuri	Apurba, Sonia Hossain, Shams Sumon	
	Chena Mukh Ochena Mukh	Apurba, Rakhi	
	Bichcheder Por	Apurba, Rakhi, Laila Hasan	
	Tumi Amar	Apurba, Rakhi, Hasan Iman, Afruza Banu	
	Valobasai Shob Hoi	Apurba, Sarika	
	Mugdho Nilimar Prantay	Apurba, Bindu, Milon	
	Priyobhashini	Apurba, Momo, Laila Hasan	
	Paliye Giye Biye	Apurba, Proba	
	Tritiyo Jon	Apurba, Bindu, Mahfuz	
	Moner Gohine	Apurba, Nafiza, D A Tayeb	
	GrohonKal	Apurba, Farha Ruma	
	Mon Kade	Apurba, Sumaiya Shimu	
	Fuler Moto Naam	Apurba, Tarin, Sharmili	
	Tomar Kache Fera	Apurba, Rumana, Sarika	
	Ekjon Vodro Mohila Othoba Mayer Golpo	Apurba, Richi, Shormili, Hasan Imam	
	Dure Aro Dure	Apurba, Orsha, Sporshia	
	Achol	Opee, Sharmili, Nafisa	
	Dujone Dekha Holo	Apurba, Richi	
	Shokha Hey	Shohiduzzaman Shelim, Farhana Mili	
	Dorjar Opashe	Apurba, Momo, Chanchal, Tomalika	
	Jodio Shondha	Apurba, Runa Khan	Same story as Raat Jaga Vore; Apurba as protagonist
	Raat Jaga Vore	Momo, Milon	Same story as Jodio Shondha; Momo as protagonist
	Bhalobashi Tomake	Mahfuz, Tinni	

=== Films ===
List of Chayanika Chowdhury film credits
Year	Title	Cast	Notes
2020	Bishwoshundori	Siam Ahmed, Pori Moni	
2022	Kagojer Bou	Emon, Pori Moni	
2023	Prohelika	Mahfuz Ahmed, Bubly	
TBA	Antorale †	Tariq Anam Khan, Pori Moni, Mahfuz Ahmed	

Key
†	Denotes film or TV productions that have not yet been released
