= Hasan Masood =

Bangladeshi actor and former Bangladesh Army Captain

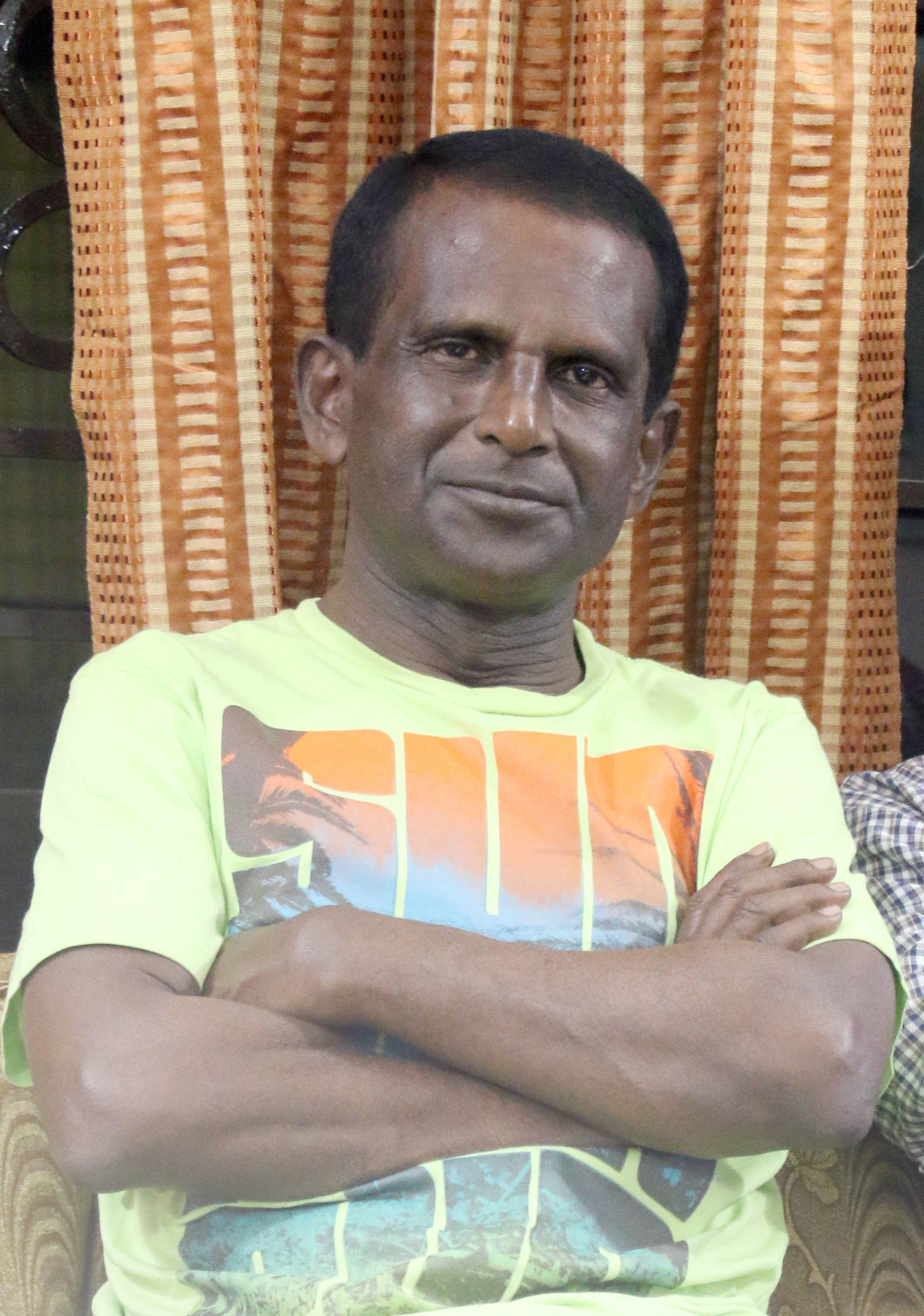
- Masood in 2016
- Born: December 16, 1962 (age 63); Pirojpur, East Pakistan, Pakistan
- Occupations: Actor, singer, journalist
- Military career
- Education: Bangladesh Military Academy
- Allegiance: Bangladesh
- Branch: Bangladesh Army
- Service years: 1984–1992
- Rank: Captain
- Unit: East Bengal Regiment

Hasan Masood (born December 16, 1962) is a Bangladeshi actor. He is also a former journalist and military officer.

== Early life and education ==
Masood was born in Barisal, but he was brought up in the city of Dhaka. He completed his SSC from BAF Shaheen College Dhaka and his HSC from the Government Titumir College in Dhaka. Hasan has been singing from an early age and he had completed a 5-year course on Nazrul Sangeet from Chhayanaut.

== Career ==
Hasan joined the Bangladesh Army in 1983 and commissioned from 11 BMA long course on 21 December 1984 in the corps of infantry and retired as a captain in 1992. He then worked as a sports correspondent at The New Nation and later in 1995, at The Daily Star, and was also a correspondent of world service in the Bengali affiliate of the British Broadcasting Corporation from February 2004 to 2008.

He was approached by Mostofa Sarwar Farooki to play a role in his film Bachelor in February 2003. Hasan took a leave from his position at The Daily Star and started his acting career. The film was released in February 2004. He later acted in the film Made in Bangladesh. His acted television drama plays include 69, "House Full," "Taxi Driver," "FDC", "Bou", "Khunshuti", "Graduate", "Ranger Duniya", "Amader Shangshar", " Gani Shaheber Shesh Kichhudin" and "Batasher Ghor".

Hasan also voiced the soundtrack Ajke Na Hoy Valobasho in the film Bachelor, which is originally a song by Khurshid Alam, written by Dewan Nazrul and composed by Alam Khan. His first music album, Hridoy Ghotito released on the Valentine's Day 2006. Marzuk Russell wrote all of 10 songs on the album, and Sanjeeb Choudhury composed the tunes with Bappa Mazumdar as the arranger of the music.

== Illness ==
Hasan fell ill and was admitted to a private hospital in Mohakhali, Dhaka on Monday night, October 27, 2025. According to hospital sources, he came to the hospital with severe headache and seizures. He was then admitted to the stroke unit of Universal Medical College Hospital in Mohakhali. The hospital's managing director, Dr. Ashish Kumar Chakraborty, said that Hasan Masud suffered an ischemic stroke. He also suffered a mild heart attack.

== Works ==
=== Films ===
Year	Title	Notes
2004	Bachelor	
2007	Made in Bangladesh	
2011	Chotto Songshar	
2012	Common Gender	
2014	Taarkata	
2021	Souvaggo	
2022	Unish 20	A Chorki web film
2025	Mon Je Bojhena	

=== Television ===
Year	Title	Notes
	Tiner Talowar	
2005	69	
2009	Housefull	
	Behind The Scene	
	Kala Jamai	
	Khadok Family	
	Taxi Driver	
	FDC	
	Bou	
	Khunshuti	
	Graduate	
	Ronger Duniya	
	Amader Songshar	
	Gani Shaheber Shesh Kichhudin	
	Batasher Ghor	
2021	Hit	
2022	Chirokumar Songho Reloaded	
2023	Team West Indies	
2023	Living Legend	
2023	Corruption	

=== Playback ===
Year	Film	Song	Notes
2004	Bachelor	Ajke Nahoy Bhalobasho...	

=== Web series ===
Year	Title	OTT	Director	Notes
2021	C for Coaching		Mabrur Rashid Bannah	
2021	Ladies & Gentleman	ZEE5	Mostofa Sarwar Farooki	
2022	Sabrina	Hoichoi	Ashfaque Nipun	

== Discography ==
=== Solo ===
Year	Title	Notes
2006	Hridoy Ghotito	

=== Film scores ===
Year	Title	Notes
2004	Bachelor	
