= Mita Noor =

Bangladeshi actress (1971-2013)

- Born: 28 September 1971; Daudkandi Upazila, Comilla District
- Died: 1 July 2013 (aged 42); Gulshan, Dhaka, Bangladesh
- Cause of death: Suicide by hanging
- Occupations: Model, actress
- Spouse: Shahanur Rahman Majumder
- Parents: Fazlur Rahman (father); Mariam Sarkar (mother)

Sabina Yasmin Mita Noor (known as Mita Noor; born 28 September 1971; died 1 July 2013) was a Bangladeshi actress. On 1 July 2013, she committed suicide by hanging herself at her home in Gulshan, Dhaka.

== Career ==
As a child, Noor attended Bulbul Lalitakala Academy to learn Bharatnatyam. She debuted in 1989 with weekly drama Sagar Sechar Swadh on Bangladesh Television. She also took part as a model in TV advertisements. In 2011 she directed one short play Chowngali.

== Personal life ==
Noor was married to businessman Shahanur Rahman Majumder for 24 years. Together they had two sons - Shehzad Noor Taus and Sadman Noor Tahmid. Taus was on the news when he had created the first-ever Bangladeshi meta-search engine SearchW3.net at the age of 13.

== Death ==
On 1 July 2013, after a history of depression, Noor committed suicide by hanging herself at her home in Gulshan, Dhaka.
