= Mostofa Sarwar Farooki =

Bangladeshi film director and producer

- মোস্তফা সরোয়ার ফারুকী
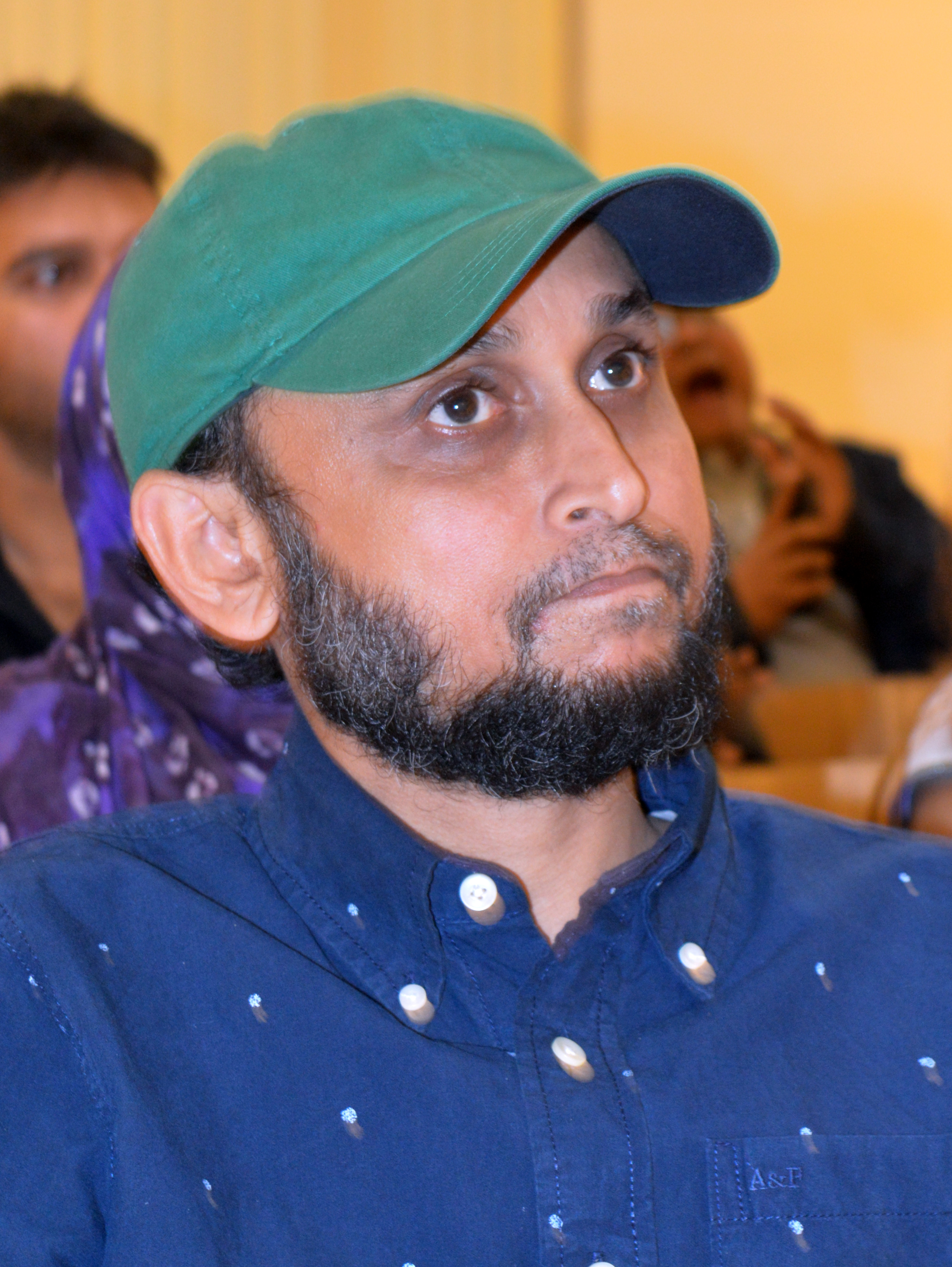
- Farooki in 2016

Adviser of Cultural Affairs, Interim Government of Bangladesh
- In office 10 November 2024 – 17 February 2026
- President: Mohammed Shahabuddin
- Chief Adviser: Muhammad Yunus
- Preceded by: Asif Nazrul
- Succeeded by: Nitai Roy Chowdhury

Personal details
- Born: 2 May 1973 (age 53) Dhaka, Bangladesh
- Spouse: Nusrat Imrose Tisha (m. 2010)
- Children: 1
- Education: Tejgaon Government Boys' High School (SSC)
- Occupation: Film Maker, Film Producer, and Screenwriter

Mostofa Sarwar Farooki (Bengali: মোস্তফা সরোয়ার ফারুকী) is a Bangladeshi film director, producer and screenwriter who works in Bengali films. His films Third Person Singular Number, Television, No Bed Of Roses were critically acclaimed across the world and received numerous international and national awards. On November 10, 2024, he was appointed as the Adviser to the Ministry of Cultural Affairs in the Interim government of Bangladesh.

== Early life ==
Farooki was born 2 May 1973 in the Nakhalpara neighborhood of Dhaka, Bangladesh. He attended Tejgaon Government Boys' High School.

== Career ==
Farooki has set a new trend in terms of presentation and direction in the early 2000. His debut film was Bachelor (2003) starring Humayun Faridi, Aupee Karim, Ferdous Ahmed, Shabnur, [Marzuk Russell] and many others. Then his second film, a political satire Made In Bangladesh (2007) starring Zahid Hasan, Tariq Anam Khan, Shahiduzzaman Selim and others. His third film Third Person Singular Number starring Nusrat Imrose Tisha, Topu, Mosharraf Karim was premiered in Busan International Film Festival (2009). It had its European premier in International Film Festival Rotterdam, It was also in the official competition 2009 Middle East International Film Festival. After that he made a short film named Ok Cut.

His fourth feature Television (2012) starring Chanchal Chowdhury, Nusrat Imrose Tisha, Mosharraf Karim and Kazi Shahir Huda Rumi was the closing film of Busan International Film Festival and won the APSA Grand Jury Prize in 2013, as well as a further five international awards from Dubai, Jogja-NETPAC Asian Film Festival, Rome's Asiatica Film Mediale, and Kolkata International Film Festival. His fifth feature film Ant Story starring Sheena Chohan and Noor Imran Mithu was nominated for the Golden Goblet Awards and the Dubai International Film Festival's Muhr AsiaAfrica Awards. In 2014 it was also in competition for APSA and both the Singapore and Kerala International Film Festivals. He finished his sixth feature film Doob: No Bed of Roses starring international star Irrfan Khan, Nusrat Imrose Tisha, Parno Mittra, Rokeya Prachy and others. It was an official project of Film Bazar India 2013. It won Dubai Film Market Award and Kommersant Jury Prize at Moscow International Film Festival 2017.

He is all set to release his upcoming ambitious project, a one-shot film, Saturday Afternoon starring Nusrat Imrose Tisha, Parambrata Chatterjee, Zahid Hasan, Eyad Hourani, Mamunur Rashid, a Bangladesh-Germany-Russia co-production inspired by the Dhaka terror attack incident of 1 July 2016 at the Holey Artisan Bakery, Gulshan. The film had its world premiere at the main competition section of 41st Moscow International Film Festival 2019 and won the Russian Federation of Film Critics Jury Prize and Komersant Prize. It is the first of three films of his identity trilogy, the second one being No Land's Man starring Nawazuddin Siddiqui and the third, Memoria will be based on the Rohingya refugees.

Farooki was appointed as an international jury of Asia Pacific Screen Awards 2015, Busan International Film Festival 2017 and Kolkata International Film Festival 2017 and Dhaka International Film Festival 2020. He was also an invited guest and speaker at many other prestigious film festivals. In 2019, he received the Fazlul Haq Memorial Award 2018 and was also honoured by Kaler Kantho newspaper on their anniversary.

Farooki also makes commercials for local and international brands like Djuice, Citycell, Banglalink, Ekhanei.com, Crown Cement, Grameenphone, Close-Up, Robi etc. His most popular commercial was for Meril Soap bar starring Tisha.

=== In ministerial role ===
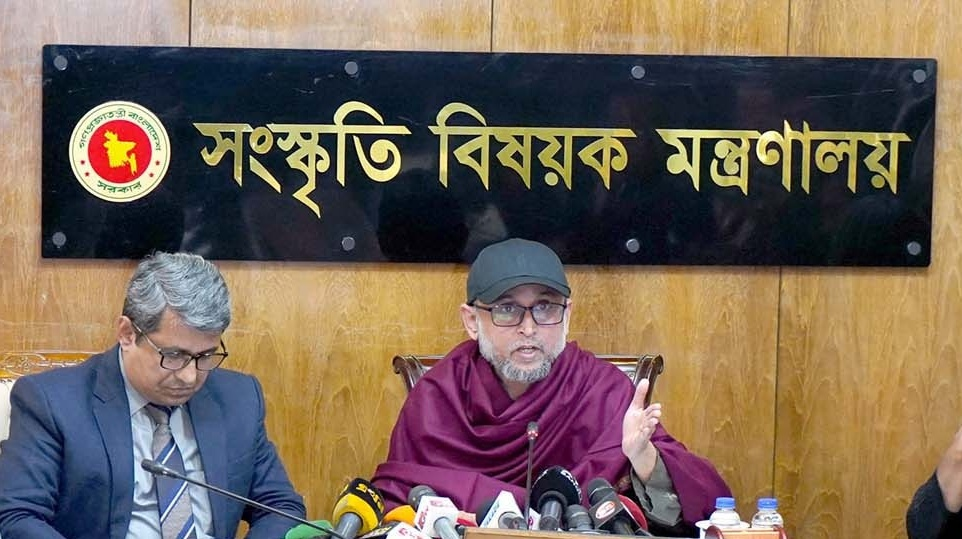
Farooki speaking at a Ministry of Cultural Affairs press conference

Farooki was appointed an adviser to the interim government of Bangladesh on 10 November 2024. He is responsible for the Ministry of Cultural Affairs. Protests took place in various parts of the country, including Dhaka University and Jahangirnagar University, following his appointment as an Adviser, due to perceptions of his close ties to the Sheikh Hasina administration.

== Cinematic style ==
Farooki's body of work address such themes as middle class angst, urban youth romance, deception-hypocrisy and frailty of individual, frustration about the confines of one's culture and conservative Muslim concepts of guilt and redemption.

Brisbane's Asia Pacific Screen Awards says of his work, "His films often deal with the way individuals free themselves from the limitations placed on them by their identity, economic circumstances and belief systems. To counter the deprivation they face in real life, his characters often seem to create a fantasy world around them, lending elements of magical realism to Farooki's signature style." "Mostofa Sarwar Farooki could be the next South-east Asian filmmaker to break out", The Hollywood Reporter wrote in the review of his film Television. Variety's Jay Weissberg wrote. "Mostofa Sarwar Farooki is a key exemplar of Bangladeshi new wave cinema movement".

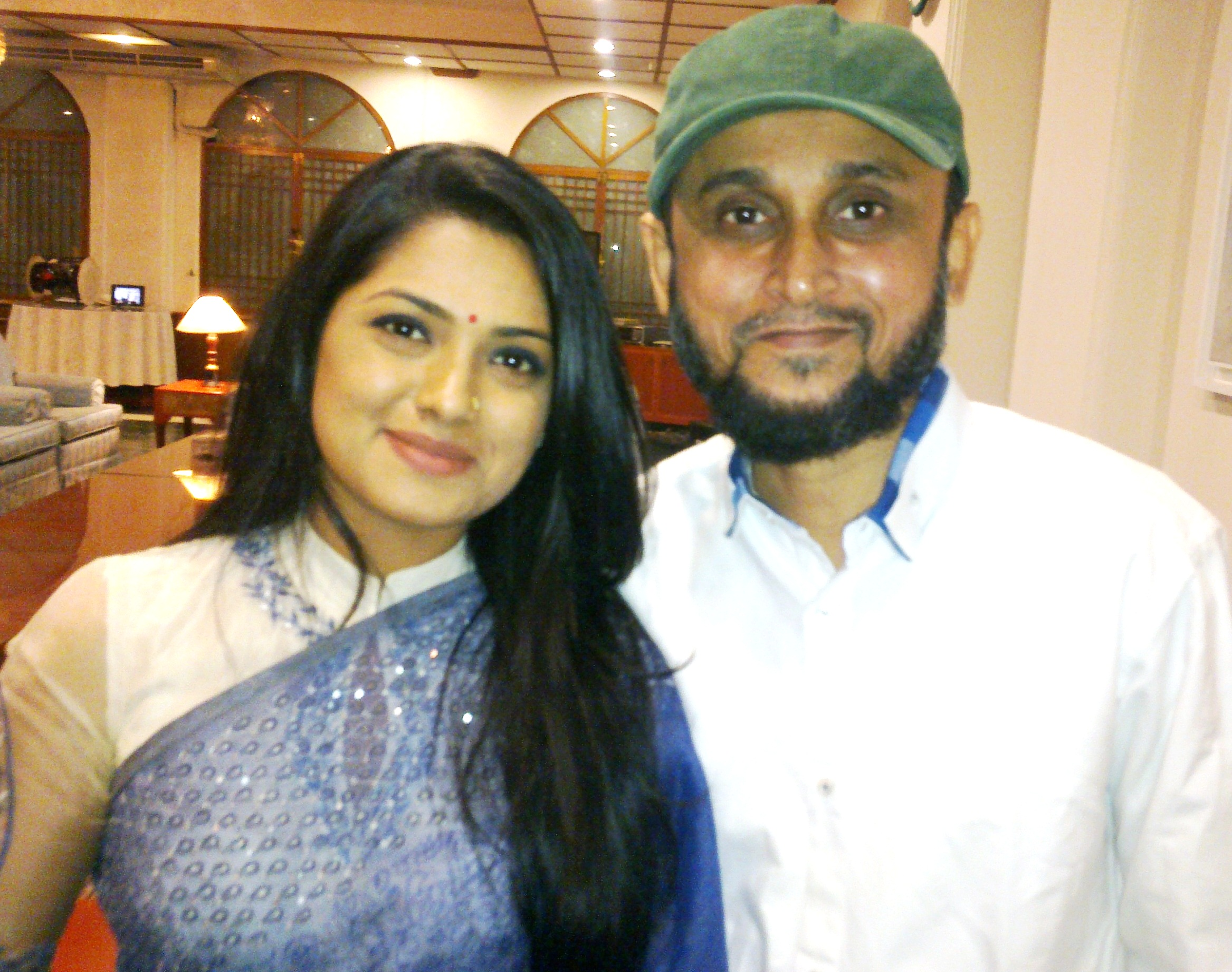
Tisha and Farooki in 2015

== Personal life ==
Farooki is married to the actress Nusrat Imrose Tisha since 16 July 2010. Together they have a daughter.

== Filmography ==
Year	Films	Notes	References
2003	Bachelor	Official Selection - New Jersey Independent South Asian Cine Fest; Official Selection - Third Eye IFF Mumbai; Official Selection -Asiatica filmmediale, Rome; Winner, Best Actress at Bangladesh National Film Award 2004	
2007	Made in Bangladesh	Winner, Special Mention (Best Film) - Dhaka International Film Festival 2008	
2009	Third Person Singular Number	Official Selection - Pusan International Film Festival 2009; Official Selection - International Film Festival Rotterdam (2010); Official Competition - Abu Dhabi Film Festival 2009; Winner, Best Director - Dhaka International Film Festival 2010; Official Competition - Tiburon International Film Festival 2010; Winner, Best Film, Best Film Director, Best Film Actor and Best Film Actress - Meril Prothom Alo Awards 2010; Official Competition - Jogja-NETPAC Asian Film Festival 2010; Official Competition - Festival Cinema Africano, Asia e America Latina, Milano, Italy (2010); Official Selection - Keswick Film Festival 2014; Official Selection - Fribourg International Film Festival 2010; Bangladesh's official submission to 83rd Academy Awards for Best Foreign Language Film	
2010	Ok, Cut	Official Competition - Kazan International Festival of Muslim Cinema 2010; Screened at NETPAC Seminar - International Film Festival Rotterdam 2010	
2012	Television	Closing film - Busan International Film Festival 2012 (world premiere); Bangladesh's submission to 86th Academy Award foreign language category.; Winner, Jury Grand Prize - Asia Pacific Screen Award 2013.; Nominee, Best Film and Best Screenplay - Asia Pacific Screen Award 2013; Winner, City of Rome Award (jury) for best Asian Feature Film and Audience Award(Best Film) - Asiatica 2013, Rome-Italy.; Winner, NETPAC Award - Kolkata International Film Festival, 2013; Winner, Special mention award, Muhr AsiaAfrica Dubai International Film Festival 2012.; Winner, Golden Hanoman Award - Jogja-NETPAC Asian Film Festival 2013; Official Competition - Asia-Pacific Film Festival, 2012; Official Competition - Cinemanila International Film Festival 2012; Official Selection - International Film Festival of Kerala; Official Selection, Open Doors Screening - Locarno Film Festival; Official Selection - Portland International Film Festival 2014; Winner, Asian Cinema Fund for script development and Post-Production - Busan International Film Festival; Winner - Gothenburg Film Festival fund 2010 for script development; Official Project, Asian Project Market, BIFF 2010; Official Project, Film Bazaar India, 2010; Official Selection - Keswick Film Festival 2014	
2013	Ant Story	Official Competition - Shanghai Film Festival; Official Competition -Asia Pacific Screen Award, 2014.; Winner, Best Film Director (Critics Choice) - Meril Prothom Alo Awards 2014.; Official selection - Busan International Film Festival 2014.; Official Selection - Melbourne IFF (films From subcontinent) 2014; Nominee, Silver Screen Award - Singapore International Film Festival 2014; Nominee, Jury Award, Best Asian Film - Asian Film Festival, Dallas 2014; Official Competition, Dubai International Film Festival December, 2013 (World Premiere); Official Competition - International Film Festival of Kerala 2014; Official Project, Asian Project Market, BIFF 2013; Official Competition - Kazan International Festival of Muslim Cinema 2014	
2017	Doob: No Bed of Roses	Winner, Dubai film market award - Film Bazar India 2013; Winner, Kommersant Jury Prize - Moscow International Film Festival 2017; Official Competition - Shanghai International Film Festival 2017; Official Selection - Busan International Film Festival; Official Competition - El-Gouna Film Festival 2017; Official Selection - Vancouver International Film Festival 2017.; Closing Film - South Asian Film Festival, Paris, 2017.; Official Selection - 48th International Film Festival of India, Goa 2017.; Official Competition - Festival Cinema Africano, Asia e America Latina 2018; Official Selection - Filmfest München 2018; Official Selection - Seattle International Film Festival 2018; Official Selection - Asian World Film Festival 2018.; Official Selection - London Indian Film Festival 2018; Official Selection - Asian Film Festival, Barcelona; Official Selection - International Film Festival of Kerala 2017; Bangladesh's submission to 91st Academy Awards foreign language film category.; Nominee, Best Actor(Critics), Best Lyrics, Best Cinematography, Best Background Score - Filmfare Awards East; Official Selection - Chicago South Asian Film Festival 2018; Official Selection - International Film Festival of South Asia, Toronto 2018	
2019	Shonibar Bikel	Nominee, CineCo Pro Award - Filmfest München; Official Selection, Busan International Film Festival 2019; Official Selection, London Indian Film Festival 2019; Official Selection, Sydney Film Festival. 2019; Official competition, Moscow International Film Festival 2019; Official Selection, Hong Kong Asian Film Festival 2019; Official competition, Vesoul International Film Festival of Asian Cinema 2020; Official Selection, Focus on Asia Fukuoka International Film Festival 2020; 2019 - Kommersant Prize Moscow International Film Festival; 2019 - Russian Federation of Film Critics Jury Prize, Moscow International Film Festival; 2020 - NETPAC Award, Vesoul International Film Festival for Asian Cinema; 2020 - Kumamoto City Award, Fukuoka International Film Festival; 2020 - High School Award, Vesoul International Film Festival for Asian Cinema	
2021	No Land's Man	Winner, MPA Film Fund, Asia Pacific Screen Awards 2014; Winner, Most Promising Project - Film Bazaar India, 2014; Official Project, Asian Project Market, Busan International Film Festival, 2014; Nominee, Kim Ji Seok Award - Busan International Film Festival 2021; Special Screening - Cairo International Film Festival 2021; Official screening, Current waves - Tallinn Black Nights Film Festival 2021	
TBA	A Burning Question		
2023	Something Like an Autobiography	A part of the 'Ministry of Love' 12-Film Anthology for Bangladeshi streaming platform Chorki.; Official Selection, 'Kim Jiseok' section of the 28th Busan International Film Festival	
2024	840		

=== Television ===
Title	Notes
Ekanno Borti	
69 TV series	
Choruivati	
420 TV series	
Upsonghar	
Tal Patar Shepai	
Unmanush	
Carrom (Part 1)	
Carrom (Part 2)	
Balok Balikara	
Spartacus 71	
Emon Deshti Kothao Khuje Pabe Nako Tumi	

=== Web content ===
Year	Title	Platform	Notes
2021	Ladies & Gentleman	ZEE5	

== Chabial ==
Farooki is the founder of Chabial, a film makers club. This group of young film makers used to be Farooki's assistant directors. They then used local cable television networks as a platform to master their hands in story telling and created an audience for the stories they tell. Their works have managed to connect primarily with the youth in urban and suburban parts of the Bangladeshi society for the realism in story topics and realism in execution.
