= Tony Dias =

Bangladeshi television actor and director

- টনি ডায়েস
- Occupations: Actor; director
- Spouse: Priya Dias
- Children: 1

Tony Dias is a Bangladeshi television actor and director.

== Career ==
In 1989, Dias joined the theatre group "Nagorik Natya Sampradaya".

== Personal life ==
Dias is married to dancer, actress, and model Priya Dias. Together, with their daughter Ahona, they reside in Hicksville in Long Island, New York, US. Dias works as a sales manager in auto sales.
