= Zahid Hasan (actor) =

Bangladeshi actor

- জাহিদ হাসান
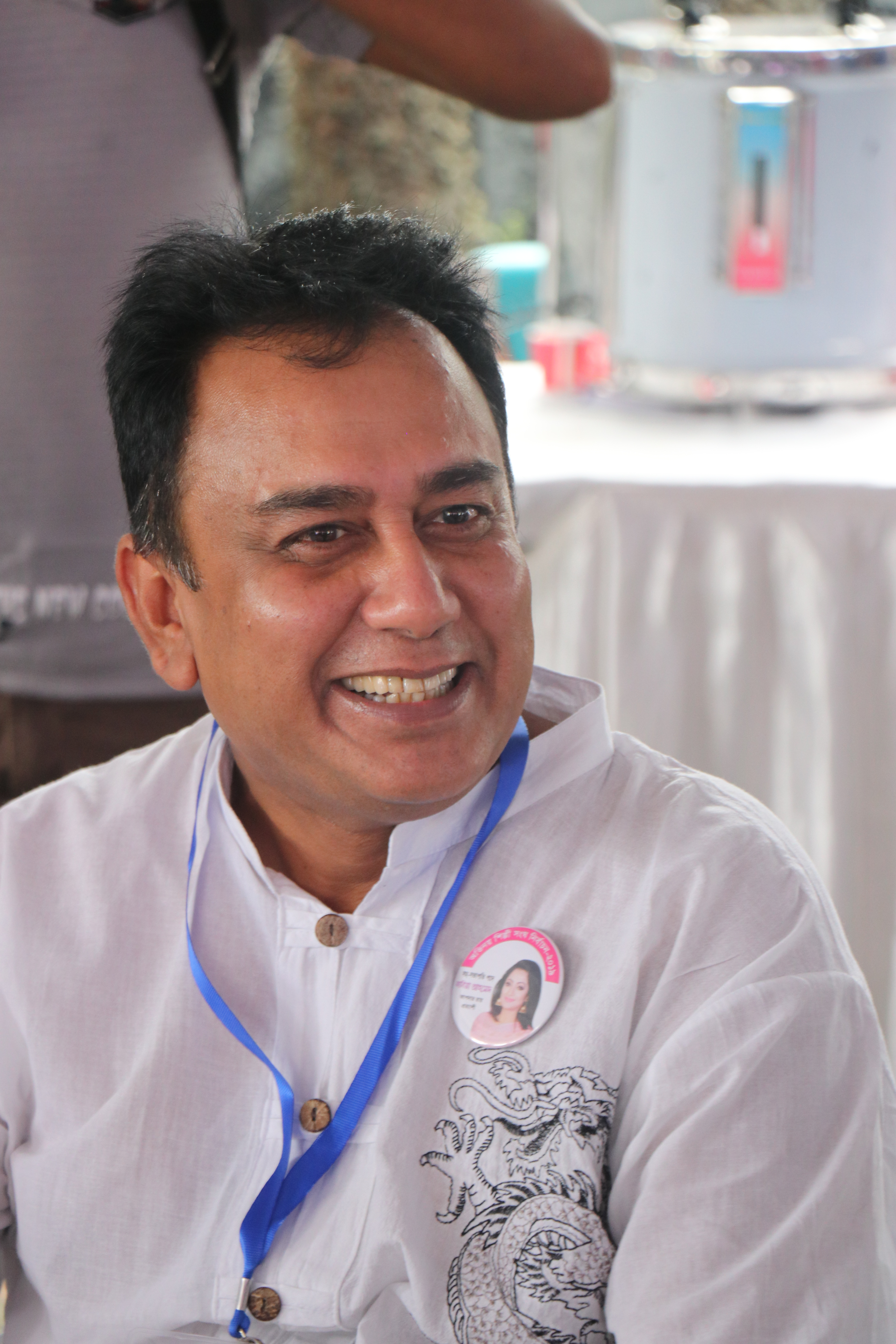
- Hasan in 2019
- Born: 4 October 1965 (age 61); Sirajganj, East Pakistan
- Occupations: Actor; director; model
- Years active: 1986-present
- Spouse: Sadia Islam Mou (m. 1997)
- Children: 2
- Awards: National Film Award; Meril Prothom Alo Awards; Bachsas Awards

Comedy career
- Medium: Television; Film
- Genres: Character comedy; Sitcom
- Subject: Everyday life

Zahid Hasan (born 4 October 1965) is a Bangladeshi film, television and stage actor. Having established himself as an actor in the 1990s, he has since become one of Bangladesh’s popular figures in show business. He is also a TV commercial model. He was awarded Bangladesh National Film Award for Best Actor for his performance in the film Srabon Megher Din (1999).

== Career ==
Hasan was part of a theatre group for several years before moving to television in 1990. He took the lead in the BTV adaptation of Rabindranath Tagore's Shomapti and the protagonist in Bichchhu. While he made his first film appearance in Bolban in 1986, his most notable role was in the 2000s Srabon Megher Din, for which he won a National Award. In addition to acting, he has directed several serials and teleplays.

By 2008, he had started a production house named Pushpita Visuals.

== Personal life ==
Hasan married Sadia Islam Mou in 1997. Together they have a daughter and a son.

== Television ==
=== Television ===
Hasan is well known for his comedic roles in television drama plays and serials. His debut drama, Jibon Jemon was telecast in 1990. He performed in the drama serial Graduate. He has acted in more than 80 television dramas.

==== Actor ====
| Year | Title | Playwright & Director | Co-Artist | Aired on | Note & Source |
|---|---|---|---|---|---|
| 1992 | Shongkito Podojatra | Mansurul Aziz & Kha Ma Harun | Bipasha Hayat | BTV | |
| | Somudrobilas Private Limited | Humayun Ahmed | Asaduzzaman Noor | BTV | |
| | Grihoshukh Private Limited | Humayun Ahmed | | BTV | |
| | Nokkhotrer Raat | Humayun Ahmed | | BTV | |
| | Nishithini | Humayun Ahmed | Tonima Hamid, Aupee Karim | BTV | |
| 1996 | Aaj Robibar | Humayun Ahmed | Aly Zaker, Abul Hayat, Suborna Mustafa, Shaon, Shila Ahmed | BTV | TV serial |
| | Sobuj Sathi | | | | |
| | Newsman | | Nipun | | |
| | Putrodaye | Hanif Sanket | Monalisa | | TV play |
| | Laal Nil Beguni | Zahid Hasan | Purnima | Banglavision | |
| | Arman Bhai | Sagar Jahan | Nusrat Imrose Tisha, Afnan | Banglavision | |
| | Abaro Arman Vai | Sagar Jahan | Nusrat Imrose Tisha, Afnan | Banglavision | |
| | Arman Bhai Koya Parche | Sagar Jahan | Nusrat Imrose Tisha, Afnan | Banglavision | |
| | Arman Vai Faisha Gese | Sagar Jahan | Nusrat Imrose Tisha, Afnan | Banglavision | |
| | Arman Vai the Gentleman | Sagar Jahan | Nusrat Imrose Tisha, Afnan | Banglavision | |
| | Batighor | Syed Shakil | Nisha | | |
| | Pipasha | | Richi, Shumi, Abul Hayat, Doly Johur | | |
| 2010 | Graduate | Muhammad Mostafa Kamal Raz | Nusrat Imrose Tisha, Siddique | ntv | TV serial, won Best actor (TV) in Meril Prothom Alo Awards |
| 2010 | Montri Mohodoyer Agomon Shubechcha Shagotom | Humayun Ahmed | Challenger, Riaz, Mahfuz Ahmed, Faruque Ahmed, Maznun Mizan, S I Tutul, Hosne Ara Putul | BTV | |
| 2010 | Sei Chokh | | Sadia Islam Mou | | telefilm |
| 2011 | Poush Phaguner Pala | Afsana Mimi | | ATN Bangla | |
| 2011 | Tokhon Boshonto | Shafiqur Rahman Shantanu; Humayun Faridi | Mou, Jitu Ahsan, Shams Sumon, Farah Ruma | | |
| 2011 | Arman Bhai Birat Tension e | Sagar Jahan (both) | Nusrat Imroz Tisha, Afnan | Banglavision | 4th sequel of Arman Bhai, aired on 3rd day of Eid |
| 2011 | Benefit of Doubt | | Monalisa | ntv | TV play, aired on Eid-Ul-Adha |
| 2011 | Second Hand | Shafiqur Rahman Shantanu | Sarika Sabrin, Mita Noor, Majnun Mijan | ntv | TV play, aired on Eid-Ul-Adha |
| 2012 | Capsule Five Hundred Mg | Mohammad Noman | | Rtv | TV serial |
| 2012 | Joynal Jadukor | Himu Akram | | Ekushey Television | |
| 2012 | Toto Company | Ashraful Chanchal; Zahid Hasan | Azizul Hakim, Mir Sabbir, Chhonda, Ahana | ATN Bangla | TV serial, as a journalist |
| 2012 | Korta Kahini | Aranya Anwar | | | played three characters simultaneously and nominated for Best TV Actor in Meril Prothom Alo Awards |
| 2012 | Alal O Dulal | Mir Sabbir (both) | Mir Sabbir | ATN Bangla | |
| 2012 | Arman Bhai House Husband | Sagar Jahan (both) | Nusrat Imroz Tisha, Afnan | Banglavision | 5th sequel of Arman Bhai |
| 2012 | Arman Vai Honeymoon e | Sagar Jahan (both) | Nusrat Imroz Tisha, Afnan | Banglavision | 6th sequel of Arman Bhai, aired on Eid-ul-Adha, won Meril Prothom Alo Awards in Best TV Actor category |
| 2012 | Chithhi | Zahid Hasan | Rumana | | telefilm, aired on Eid-ul-Adha |
| 2012 | Nilima Kadchhe Keno | Zahid Hasan | Sarika Sabrin | | TV play, aired on Eid-ul-Adha |
| 2012 | Shaheb Babur Boithhok-khana | Zahidul Islam Mintu | | | TV serial |
| 2013 | Ar Kichhu Nai Baki | Touhid Hasan; Dipankar Deepan | Mou | | |
| 2013 | Barisailla Pola Ashi Taka Tola | Mir Sabbir (both) | Mir Sabbir | | |
| 2013 | Alal-Dulal Tritio Porbo | Mir Sabbir (both) | Mir Sabbir | | |
| 2013 | Ukil Jamai | Jakir Hossain Uzzal; Shamim Azad | Prasun Azad, Shamim Azad | Rtv | TV play, aired on Eid |
| 2013 | Tipu Sultaner Hati | Himu Akram (both) | Faruk Ahmed, Rifat Chowdhury | | TV play |
| 2013 | Bishe Bishokkhay | Diya Raha | | | |
| 2013 | Sangrila | Tauquir Ahmed; Shahiduzzaman Selim | Azizul Hakim, Tauquir Ahmed, Shahiduzzaman Selim, Mahfuz, Tarin, Joya | | |
| 2013 | Emotional Abdul Matin | Zahid Hasan (both) | Rakhi | Banglavision | TV play, aired on Eid |
| 2013 | Jhograpur | Golam Rabbani; Zahid Hasan | Rumana | Banglavision | TV play, acted in three character, aired on 5th day of Eid |
| 2013 | Priti o Shuvechcha | Jakir Hossain Uzzal; Zahid Hasan | Nipun, Siddique | ATN Bangla | telefilm, aired on Eid-Ul-Adha |
| 2014 | Agun Khela | Sharifur Rahman Shantanu; Imran Halder | Mir Sabbir, Bonna Mirza, Mita Noor | Channel i | TV serial, aired from February 5, 2014, on every Wednesday and Thursday |
| 2014 | Bhai | Golam Rabbani; Zahid Hasan | | | TV serial, double role |
| 2014 | Mr. & Mrs. Shahriar | Anjan Aich (both) | Sadia Islam Mou, Majnun Mijan | Ekushey TV | TV play, aired on Pahela Boishakh |
| 2014 | Nojir Bihin Nojor Ali | Himu Akram (both) | Ahana, Siddique | Rtv | TV serial, aired every Sunday to Wednesday from April 16, 2014 |
| 2014 | Bou Pagol | Jakir Hossain Uzzal; Shamim Zaman | Shoshi, Shamim Zaman | Rtv | aired on Eid-Ul-Fitr |
| 2014 | Formal-In | Masud Sejan | Nipun, Sonia Hossain | Banglavision | 6 episode TV serial, aired on Eid-Ul-Fitr |
| 2014 | Formal-In Plus | Masud Sejan | Nipun, Mishu Sabbir | Banglavision | 6 episode TV serial, aired on Eid-Ul-Adha |
| 2014 | Hiyar Majhe Lukiye Chhile | Jakir Hossain Uzzal; Shamim Zaman | Razi Ali | SA TV | aired on Eid-Ul-Adha |
| 2014 | Ektuku Chhua Lage | Jakir Hossain Uzzal; Mojibu Haque Khokon | Sadia Islam Mou | Channel i | TV play, aired on 5th day of Eid-Ul-Adha |
| 2015 | Formal-In Action | Masud Sejan | | Banglavision | 6 episode TV serial, aired on Eid-Ul-Fitr |
| 2015 | Formalin Reaction | Masud Sejan | | Banglavision | 6 episode TV serial, aired on Eid-Ul-Adha |
| 2015 | Pori | Arif | Nisha | | single-episode TV play, aired on Eid-ul-Azha |
| 2015 | Kew Kotha Rakheni | Ahsan Alamgir; Zahid Hasan | Nisha | Asian TV | 7 episode TV serial, aire on Eid-ul-Azha |
| 2020 | 100 te Eksho | Abu Hayat Mahmud | Mim Mantasha | Maasranga Television | drama serial, aired on Maasranga Television |
| 2021 | Odol Bodol | Sohel Rana Emon | Nadia Ahmed, Farhana Mili | Maasranga Television | drama serial, aired on Maasranga Television |

==== Director ====
| Year | Title | Playwright & Director | Co-Artist | Aired on | Note & Source |
|---|---|---|---|---|---|
| 2010 | Lal Neel Beguni | | Zahid Hasan | ATN Bangla | |
| 2011 | Eka | | | | |
| 2011 | Chur Kuthhuri | | | | |
| 2011 | Hater Rekha Kotha Bole | | | ATN Bangla | |
| 2012 | Toto Company | Ashraful Chanchal | Azizul Hakim, Mir Sabbir, Chonda, Ahana | ATN Bangla | |
| 2012 | Shubho Bibaho | | Zahid Hasan | Maasranga Television | 8 episode TV serial |
| 2012 | Sorry, Ektu Deri Hoye Galo | | Zahid Hasan | | single-episode TV play |
| 2013 | Samrajya | | | SA TV | TV play, aired on Eid |
| 2013 | Magistrate | | | ATN Bangla | TV play, aired on Eid |
| 2013 | Emotional Abdul Matin | Zahid Hasan | Zahid Hasan, Rakhi | Banglavision | TV play, aired on Eid |
| 2013 | Jhograpur | Golam Rabbani | Zahid Hasan, Rumana | Banglavision | aired on 5th day of Eid |
| 2013 | Priti o Shuvechcha | Jakir Hossain Uzzal | Zahid Hasan, Nipun, Siddique | ATN Bangla | telefilm, aired on Eid-Ul-Adha |
| 2014 | Bhai | Golam Rabbani | Zahid Hasan | | TV serial |
| 2015 | Kew Kotha Rakheni | Ahsan Alamgir | Zahid Hasan, Nisha | Asian TV | 7 episode drama serial, aire on Eid-ul-Azha |

==== Other television appearances ====
| Year | Program | Anchor | Co-Artist | Aired on |
|---|---|---|---|---|
| 2013 | Ekanto Alapon | Tania Ahmed | - | Banglavision |
| 2014 | Ittyadi | Hanif Sanket | Fahmida Nabi, Samina Chowdhury, Agun, Tarin, Mir Sabbir, Apurba | Bangladesh Television |
| 2014 | Humayun Ahmed er Nil Podder Chhoya | Meher Afroz Shaon | Mahfuz Ahmed | Banglavision |

== Filmography ==
Key
| † | Denotes films that have not yet been released |

| Year | Film | Role | Notes | Ref. |
|---|---|---|---|---|
| 1986 | Boloban | Sani | Debut film; Bangladesh-Pakistan-Sri Lanka co-production film | |
| 1996 | Jibon Songi | Jibon | | |
| 1999 | Srabon Megher Din | Moti | Winner – Bangladesh National Film Award for Best Actor | |
| 2005 | Shankhonad | Osman | | |
| 2007 | Made in Bangladesh | Khorshed | | |
| 2007 | Jhontu Montu Dui Bhai | Jhontu / Montu | Dual role | |
| 2007 | Priyo Shathi | Zahid | | |
| 2008 | Amar Ache Jol | Jamil | | |
| 2011 | Projapoti | Tanveer | | |
| 2017 | Haldaa | Nader Chowdhury | Winner – Bangladesh National Film Award for Best Negative Role | |
| 2018 | Bizli | Shahjad | | |
| 2019 | Sitara | Dilu | Debut Indian Bengali film | |
| 2019 | Shonibar Bikel | Shahidul | Bangladesh-Germany-Russia co-production film | |
| 2019 | Shapludu | Irfan | Winner – Bangladesh National Film Award for Best Negative Role | |
| 2022 | Mafia | Noni "Boro Bhai" | | |
| 2025 | Amalnama | Imran Zaman | Released on Chorki | |
| 2025 | Utshob | Jahangir | | |
| 2026 | Domm: Until The Last Breath | Foreign Minister | Cameo appearance | |

=== Music videos ===
| Year | Title | Artist | Producer | Label |
|---|---|---|---|---|
| 2017 | "Beainshab" | Pritom Hasan featuring Protic Hasan & Naumi | Pritom Hasan | Gaanchill Music |

== Awards and nominations ==
| Year | Awards | Category | Film/Drama | Result |
|---|---|---|---|---|
| 1998 | Meril Prothom Alo Awards | Public Choice Best TV Actor | | Won |
| 1999 | National Film Awards | Best Actor | Srabon Megher Din | Won |
| 1999 | Meril Prothom Alo Awards | Public Choice Best TV Actor | | Won |
| 2000 | Meril Prothom Alo Awards | Public Choice Best TV Actor | | Won |
| 2001 | Meril Prothom Alo Awards | Public Choice Best TV Actor | | Won |
| 2002 | Meril Prothom Alo Awards | Public Choice Best TV Actor | | Won |
| 2007 | Meril Prothom Alo Awards | Public Choice Best TV Actor | | Won |
| 2010 | Meril Prothom Alo Awards | Public Choice Best TV Actor | Graduate | Won |
| 2012 | Meril Prothom Alo Awards | Public Choice Best TV Actor | Arman Bhai Honeymoon e | Won |
| 2012 | Meril Prothom Alo Awards | Critics' Choice Best TV Actor | Korta Kahini | Nominated |
| 2017 | National Film Awards | Best Actor in Negative Role | Haldaa | Won |
| 2019 | National Film Awards | Best Actor in Negative Role | Shapludu | Won |
