= List of adventure films of the 2020s =

Below is a list of adventure films released in the 2020s.

== 2020 ==
Title	Director	Cast	Country	Subgenre/notes
The Call of the Wild	Chris Sanders	Harrison Ford	United States	
The Christmas Chronicles 2	Chris Columbus	Kurt Russell, Goldie Hawn	United States	
Dolittle	Stephen Gaghan	Robert Downey Jr.	United States	
Fortitude	Jorge Thielen Armand	Jorge Roque Thielen H.	Venezuela; Colombia; France; Netherlands; Canada	Adventure drama
Love and Monsters	Michael Matthews	Dylan O'Brien	United States	
The Old Guard	Gina Prince-Bythewood	Charlize Theron	United States	
Operation Christmas Drop	Martin Wood	Kat Graham, Alexander Ludwig	United States; Guam	
Rogue	M. J. Bassett	Megan Fox	United States	
The Silver Skates	Michael Lockshin	Sonya Priss, Yura Borisov, Fedor Fedotov	Russia	
Tenet	Christopher Nolan	John David Washington	United States	

== 2021 ==
Title	Director	Cast	Country	Subgenre/notes
Chernobyl: Abyss	Danila Kozlovsky	Danila Kozlovsky	Russia	
Day of Destiny	Akay Mason & Abosi Ogba	Olumide Oworu, Denola Grey, Norbert Young, Toyin Abraham	Nigeria	Science fiction
Dogtanian and the Three Muskehounds	Toni García		Spain	Animated film
Dune	Denis Villeneuve	Timothée Chalamet, Rebecca Ferguson, Oscar Isaac	United States	Space adventure
Edge of the World	Michael Haussman	Jonathan Rhys Meyers	United States	
Endangered Species	M. J. Bassett	Rebecca Romijn, Philip Winchester, Jerry O'Connell	United States	
F9	Justin Lin	Vin Diesel	United States	
Finding ʻOhana	Jude Weng	Kea Peahu, Alex Aiono	United States	
The Green Knight	David Lowery	Dev Patel	United States	Fantasy drama
The Ice Road	Jonathan Hensleigh	Liam Neeson	United States	
Jungle Cruise	Jaume Collet-Serra	Dwayne Johnson, Emily Blunt	United States	
The Last Duel	Ridley Scott	Jodie Comer, Matt Damon, Adam Driver, Ben Affleck	United States	Adventure drama
The Mighty Victoria	Raúl Ramón	Damián Alcázar, Gerardo Oñate, Joaquín Cosío, Roberto Sosa, Edgar Vivar, Lorena de la Torre, Luis Felipe Tovar	Mexico	Comedy-drama
Schemes in Antiques	Derek Kwok	Lei Jiayin, Li Xian, Xin Zhilei, Ge You	China Hong Kong	Thriller
A Writer's Odyssey	Lu Yang	Lei Jiayin, Yang Mi, Dong Zijian, Tong Liya, Hewei Yu	China	Action, Fantasy

== 2022 ==
Title	Director	Cast	Country	Subgenre/notes
Avatar: The Way of Water	James Cameron	Sam Worthington, Zoe Saldaña, Sigourney Weaver	United States	Science fiction
The Batman	Matt Reeves	Robert Pattinson, Zoë Kravitz, Paul Dano, Colin Farrell	United States	
Beast	Baltasar Kormákur	Idris Elba	United States	
Joyride	Emer Reynolds	Olivia Colman, Charlie Reid	Ireland; United Kingdom	
The King's Daughter	Sean McNamara	Pierce Brosnan, Kaya Scodelario, Fan Bingbing, Benjamin Walker, William Hurt	United States	(shot in 2014)
The Lost City	Aaron and Adam Nee	Sandra Bullock, Channing Tatum, Daniel Radcliffe, Brad Pitt	United States	
The Northman	Robert Eggers	Alexander Skarsgård, Nicole Kidman, Ethan Hawke, Willem Dafoe, Björk	United States	Adventure drama
Puss in Boots: The Last Wish	Joel Crawford	Antonio Banderas (voice), Salma Hayek Pinault (voice), Harvey Guillén (voice)	United States	Animated film
Tad, the Lost Explorer and the Emerald Tablet	Enrique Gato		Spain	Animated film
Uncharted	Ruben Fleischer	Tom Holland, Mark Wahlberg, Antonio Banderas	United States	

== 2023 ==
Title	Director	Cast	Country	Subgenre/notes
Boudica	Jesse V. Johnson	Olga Kurylenko	United Kingdom	
Dovbush	Oles Sanin	Serhiy Strelnikov	Ukraine	
Dungeons & Dragons: Honor Among Thieves	Jonathan Goldstein, John Francis Daley	Chris Pine, Michelle Rodriguez, Hugh Grant	United States	Fantasy adventure
The Edge of the Blade	Vincent Perez	Roschdy Zem, Doria Tillier, Guillaume Gallienne, Damien Bonnard, Vincent Perez	France	
Freelance	Pierre Morel	John Cena, Alison Brie	United States	
Indiana Jones and the Dial of Destiny	James Mangold	Harrison Ford, Phoebe Waller-Bridge, Mads Mikkelsen	United States	
The Last Kingdom: Seven Kings Must Die	Edward Bazalgette	Alexander Dreymon, Harry Gilby	United Kingdom	
The Little Mermaid	Rob Marshall	Halle Bailey, Jonah Hauer-King, Melissa McCarthy, Javier Bardem	United States	
Migration	Benjamin Renner	Kumail Nanjiani (voice), Elizabeth Banks (voice), Keegan-Michael Key (voice), David Mitchell (voice), Carol Kane (voice), Caspar Jennings (voice), Tresi Gazal (voice), Danny DeVito (voice), Isabela Merced (voice)	United States	Animated film
Napoleon	Ridley Scott	Joaquin Phoenix	United States	
Plane	Jean-François Richet	Gerard Butler, Mike Colter	United States	
The Promised Land	Nikolaj Arcel	Mads Mikkelsen	Denmark	
The Super Mario Bros. Movie	Aaron Horvath, Michael Jelenic	Chris Pratt (voice)	United States	Animated film
The Three Musketeers: D'Artagnan	Martin Bourboulon	François Civil, Vincent Cassel, Eva Green	France	
The Three Musketeers: Milady	Martin Bourboulon	François Civil, Vincent Cassel, Eva Green	France	

== 2024 ==
Title	Director	Cast	Country	Subgenre/notes
All for One	Houda Benyamina	Oulaya Amamra, Sabrina Ouazani, Déborah Lukumuena, Daphné Patakia	France	
Autumn and the Black Jaguar	Gilles de Maistre	Lumi Pollack	France; Canada; Italy	
Bitter Gold	Juan Francisco Olea	Katalina Sánchez, Francisco Melo	Chile; Mexico; Uruguay; Germany	
The Count of Monte Cristo	Alexandre de La Patellière, Matthieu Delaporte	Pierre Niney	France	
Damsel	Juan Carlos Fresnadillo	Millie Bobby Brown, Robin Wright, Angela Bassett, Ray Winstone	United States	Fantasy
Eden	Ron Howard	Jude Law, Ana de Armas, Vanessa Kirby, Daniel Brühl, Sydney Sweeney	United States	
Golden Kamuy	Shigeaki Kubo	Kento Yamazaki, Anna Yamada	Japan	
Lost on a Mountain in Maine	Andrew Boodhoo Kightlinger	Luke David Blumm	United States	adventure drama survival
Prey	Mukunda Michael Dewil	Ryan Phillippe, Mena Suvari, Emile Hirsch	United States	
The Wages of Fear	Julien Leclercq	Franck Gastambide, Ana Girardot, Alban Lenoir, Sofiane Zermani	France	
Wallace & Gromit: Vengeance Most Fowl	Nick Park	Ben Whitehead, Peter Kay, Lauren Patel, Reece Shearsmith	United Kingdom	
William Tell	Nick Hamm	Claes Bang, Ben Kingsley, Jonathan Pryce	United Kingdom; Italy; Switzerland	

== 2025 ==
Title	Director	Cast	Country	Subgenre/notes
Anaconda	Tom Gormican	Paul Rudd, Jack Black, Steve Zahn, Thandiwe Newton	United States	
Fountain of Youth	Guy Ritchie	John Krasinski, Natalie Portman, Eiza González, Domhnall Gleeson	United States	
How to Train Your Dragon	Dean DeBlois	Mason Thames, Nico Parker, Gerard Butler, Nick Frost	United States	
Ice Road: Vengeance	Jonathan Hensleigh	Liam Neeson	United States	
A Minecraft Movie	Jared Hess	Jason Momoa, Jack Black, Emma Myers, Danielle Brooks	United States	
Mirai	Karthik Gattamneni	Teja Sajja, Manchu Manoj, Jagapathi Babu, Jayaram, Shriya Saran, Ritika Nayak	India	Fantasy action-adventure
Le Secret de Khéops	Barbara Schulz	Fabrice Luchini, Julia Piaton	France	

== 2026 ==
Title	Director	Cast	Country	Subgenre/notes
The Bluff	Frank E. Flowers	Priyanka Chopra, Karl Urban	United States, India	
Bonolota Express	Tanim Noor	Mosharraf Karim, Chanchal Chowdhury, Sariful Razz, Sabila Nur, Shyamol Mawla, Azmeri Haque Badhon, Zakia Bari Momo, Intekhab Dinar, Shamima Nazneen, Labonno Chowdhury	Bangladesh	Adventure comedy
Forgotten Island	Joel Crawford	H.E.R., Liza Soberano, Dave Franco, Jenny Slate, Manny Jacinto, Dolly de Leon, Jo Koy, Ronny Chieng, Lea Salonga	United States	Animated adventure comedy
Heart of the Beast	David Ayer	Brad Pitt	United States	Adventure drama
Hoppers	Daniel Chong	Piper Curda, Bobby Moynihan, Jon Hamm, Kathy Najimy, Dave Franco	United States	Animated adventure comedy
Jumanji: Open World	Jake Kasdan	Dwayne Johnson, Jack Black, Kevin Hart, Karen Gillan, Nick Jonas, Awkwafina, Alex Wolff, Morgan Turner, Ser'Darius Blain, Madison Iseman, Burn Gorman, Bebe Neuwirth, Lamorne Morris, Nasim Pedrad, Danny DeVito	United States	Adventure comedy
The Mandalorian and Grogu	Jon Favreau	Pedro Pascal, Jeremy Allen White, Brendan Wayne, Lateef Crowder, Sigourney Weaver	United States	Sci-fi, action, adventure
Moana	Thomas Kail	Catherine Laga'aia, Dwayne Johnson, John Tui, Frankie Adams, Rena Owen	United States	Musical adventure
Mutiny	Jean-François Richet	Jason Statham	United Kingdom, United States	Sea adventure
The Odyssey	Christopher Nolan	Matt Damon, Tom Holland, Anne Hathaway, Robert Pattinson, Lupita Nyong'o, Zendaya, Charlize Theron	United States	Epic fantasy adventure
Project Hail Mary	Phil Lord and Christopher Miller	Ryan Gosling, Sandra Hüller, James Ortiz, Lionel Boyce	United States	Space adventure
The Super Mario Galaxy Movie	Aaron Horvath, Michael Jelenic	Chris Pratt, Anya Taylor-Joy, Charlie Day, Jack Black, Keegan-Michael Key, Benny Safdie, Donald Glover, Issa Rae, Luis Guzmán, Kevin Michael Richardson, Brie Larson	United States, Japan	Animated adventure comedy
Supergirl	Craig Gillespie	Milly Alcock, Eve Ridley, Matthias Schoenaerts, Jason Momoa	United States	Space adventure
Tenzing	Jennifer Peedom	Genden Phuntsok, Tom Hiddleston, Willem Dafoe	Australia, United States, United Kingdom	Mountaineering adventure
Vijaynagar'er Hirey	Chandrasish Ray	Prosenjit Chatterjee, Chiranjeet Chakraborty, Aryann Bhowmik, Pushan Dasgupta, Rajnandini Paul, Satyam Bhattacharya, Anujoy Chatterjee, Sreya Bhattacharyya	India	Action adventure
The Weight	Padraic McKinley	Ethan Hawke, Russell Crowe	United States, Germany	
Wildwood	Travis Knight		United States	Animated adventure

== 2027 ==
Title	Director	Cast	Country	Subgenre/notes
A Minecraft Sequel	Jared Hess	Jason Momoa, Jack Black, Kirsten Dunst, Danielle Brooks, Matt Berry	United States	Fantasy adventure comedy
Animal Friends	Peter Atencio	Ryan Reynolds, Jason Momoa, Vince Vaughn, Aubrey Plaza, Addison Rae, Dan Levy, Lil Rel Howery, Joaquim de Almeida	United States	Hybrid animation action road comedy
Godzilla x Kong: Supernova	Grant Sputore	Kaitlyn Dever, Dan Stevens, Jack O'Connell, Matthew Modine, Delroy Lindo, Alycia Debnam-Carey, Sam Neill	United States	Sci-fi action adventure
High in the Clouds	Toby Genkel	Himesh Patel, Hannah Waddingham, Idris Elba, Pom Klementieff, Paul McCartney, Ringo Starr, Lionel Richie, Alain Chabat, Jimmy Fallon, Celine Dion, Clémence Poésy	United States, France	
How to Train Your Dragon 2	Dean DeBlois	Mason Thames, Nico Parker, Gabriel Howell, Julian Dennison, Bronwyn James, Harry Trevaldwyn, Nick Frost, Gerard Butler, Cate Blanchett, Ólafur Darri Ólafsson, Phil Dunster	United States	
Ice Age: Boiling Point	John C. Donkin	Ray Romano, John Leguizamo, Denis Leary, Simon Pegg, Queen Latifah	United States	Animated adventure comedy
The Legend of Zelda	Wes Ball	Bo Bragason, Benjamin Evan Ainsworth	United States	
Lizard Music	Benny Safdie	Dwayne Johnson, Theo Clark Leber, Tim Heidecker, Alicia Silverstone, Regina Hall, Andrew Dice Clay, Colman Domingo, Jeff Goldblum, Rachel McAdams, David Krumholtz	United States	
The Lord of the Rings: The Hunt for Gollum	Andy Serkis	Andy Serkis, Kate Winslet, Leo Woodall, Jamie Dornan, Lee Pace, Elijah Wood, Ian McKellen	United States	
The Mummy: Book of the Dead	Matt Bettinelli-Olpin, Tyler Gillett	Brendan Fraser, Rachel Weisz, John Hannah	United States	
Sonic the Hedgehog 4	Jeff Fowler	Ben Schwartz, Kristen Bell	United States	Hybrid animation, action, adventure, comedy
Star Wars: Starfighter	Shawn Levy	Ryan Gosling, Flynn Gray, Matt Smith, Mia Goth, Aaron Pierre, Simon Bird, Jamael Westman, Daniel Ings, Amy Adams	United States	Sci-fi, action, adventure
Treasure Island	Ridley Scott	Hugh Jackman, Owen Cooper, Hugh Grant	United States	Action adventure

== 2028 ==
Title	Director	Cast	Country	Subgenre/notes
Elden Ring	Alex Garland	Kit Connor, Cailee Spaeny, Ben Whishaw, Nick Offerman, Tom Burke, Havana Rose Liu, Sonoya Mizuno, Emma Laird, Peter Serafinowicz, Jonathan Pryce	United States, United Kingdom, Japan	War, fantasy, adventure
Untitled Sonic the Hedgehog spinoff film			United States	Hybrid animation, action, adventure, comedy

== 2029 ==
Title	Director	Cast	Country	Subgenre/notes
Avatar 4	James Cameron	Sam Worthington, Zoe Saldaña, Stephen Lang, Sigourney Weaver	United States	Sci-fi, action, adventure, epic

== TBA ==
Title	Director	Cast	Country	Subgenre/notes
Big Thunder Mountain	Bert & Bertie		United States	Western adventure
Bond 26	Denis Villeneuve		United Kingdom, United States	Action adventure, spy thriller
Crumble	Brian Duffield		United States	Fantasy adventure
Goonies 2	TBA		United States	Adventure comedy
The Lord of the Rings: Shadow of the Past	TBA		United States	
Metal Gear	Zach Lipovsky, Adam Stein		United States	Action adventure, spy thriller
Mirai: Jaithraya	Karthik Gattamneni		India	Fantasy action-adventure
National Treasure 3	Jon Turteltaub	Nicolas Cage	United States	Action adventure
Sky High	Thor Freudenthal		United States	Fantasy adventure
The Pirate	David Leitch	Jason Momoa	United States	Action adventure
ThunderCats	Adam Wingard		United States	Sci-fi, action adventure
Uncharted 2	Ruben Fleischer	Tom Holland, Mark Wahlberg	United States	Action adventure
Untitled animated ThunderCats movie	TBA		United States	Animation, sci-fi, action adventure
Untitled Ernest Shackleton biopic	Philip Barantini	TBA	United States	Historical adventure biopic
Untitled Pirates of the Caribbean spinoff	TBA	Margot Robbie	United States	Action adventure, fantasy
