= Misir Ali =

- Misir Ali character
- First appearance: Debi (Book: 1985)
- Last appearance: Jokhon Namibe Adhar (2012)
- Created by: Humayun Ahmed
- Portrayed by: Abul Khair; Abul Hayat; Jayanta Chattopadhyay; Ashish Khandaker; Shatabdi Wadud; Chanchal Chowdhury; Humayun Faridi

In-universe information
- Nickname: Para Psychologist
- Gender: Male
- Occupation: Professor of Para Psychology Psychiatrist.
- Family: no family but he had father in childhood and in only one book he had wife and a son and a younger brother in Debi
- Spouses: Unmarried, Nilu (in Onnobhubon)
- Significant other: Nilufar
- Children: no children, one in Onnobhubon.
- Relatives: Amita (niece)
- Nationality: Bangladeshi

Misir Ali (Bengali: মিসির আলি) is a fictional character in a series of novels by Bangladeshi author Humayun Ahmed. He was described as one of the most famous characters in Bengali literature, TV and film over the last three decades.

In the books, Ali plays the role of a part-time professor of Psychology at the University of Dhaka. Despite his not being a professional psychiatrist, people come to him for psychiatric treatment because of his special interest and knowledge in parapsychology. Later he was expelled from the University. Misir Ali is intelligent and often seen solving mysteries, although never accepting money for them. He is a logical person and doesn't believe in any paranormal activities. He has a personal diary named 'UNSOLVED,' in which he writes about those mysteries not solved by him. He is dark, tall and thin but in another story it was mentioned that he is short.

He always lives in a small flat with a servant. Most of the time those servants are seen to be running away by stealing his money. His age in 'Nishithini' was 41 and in 'Misir Ali's "Aumimaangsito Rauhosso" his age is 51. He has a nephew named Amita. His mother died when he was two years old. His father was a Hujur (Muslim priest), who died when he was in class five. He grew up in his relatives' house. He is a chain smoker, but in every story he tries to quit. Every time he gets a letter he reads it three times. He is attracted to a girl named Nilu who was his university student. He is unmarried but in the story 'Onnobhuvon' only it was mentioned that he married Nilu and had a child with her.

The movie adaptation of the first book of the series (Debi) directed by Anam Biswas, starring Chanchal Chowdhury as Misir Ali and Jaya Ahsan as Ranu was released in October, 2018. The movie received widely positive reviews from fans and critics alike.

== Bibliography ==
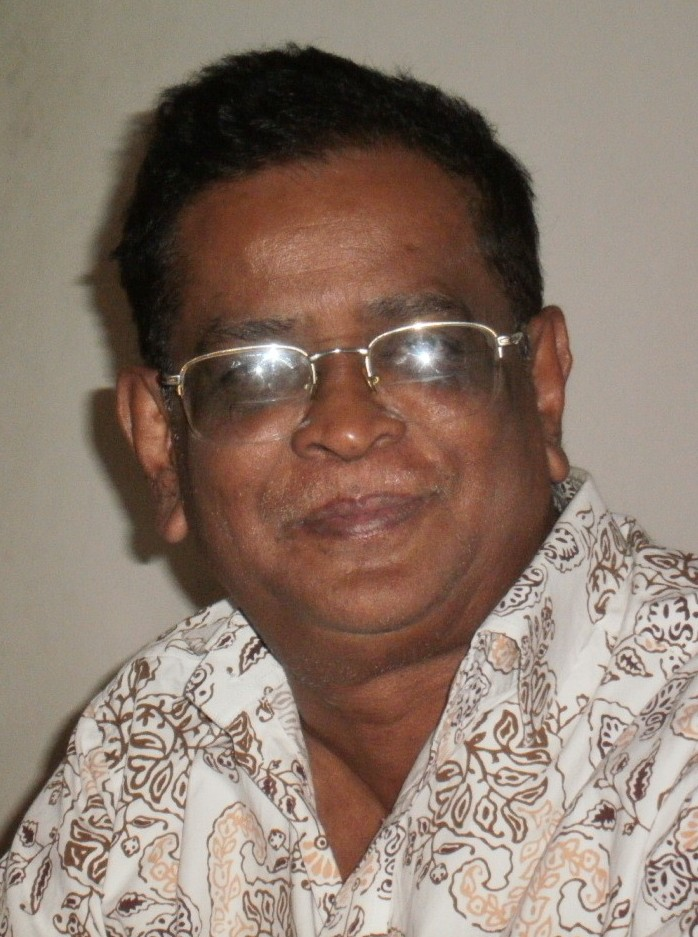
Humayun Ahmed, the creator of the character.

Among these 21 books there are 19 novels and 2 short story collections containing 11 short stories and one semi-fictional short story. He has a minor appearance in Himu's (another popular character by Humayun Ahmed) story Himur Ditiyo Prohor. Bhoy is a collection of 3 short stories and Misir Ali Unsolved is a collection of 8 short stories.

1. দেবী: Debi (Goddess) (June 1985)
2. নিশীথিনী: Nishithini (The Late Night) (1986)
3. অন্যভুবন: Onnobhubon (Otherworld) (January 1987)
4. নিষাদ: Nishad (Hunter or Niṣāda (1989) - the hunter-gatherer aborigines from Hindu epics, or alternatively the untouchable caste of corpse disposers also known as Chandalas)
5. বৃহন্নলা: Brihonnola (Eunuch or Bṛhannalā (August 1989) - the eunuch guise of one of the protagonist characters in the Hindu epic Mahabharata)
6. ভয়: Bhoy (Fear) - A collection 3 stories:
  1. "চোখ", ("The Eye",)
  2. "জিন-কফিল" ("Kofil the Jinn")
  3. "সঙ্গিনী" ("The Lady Companion") (May 1991)
7. বিপদ: Bipod (Danger) (November 1991)
8. অনীশ: Onish (Godless) (May 1992)
9. আমি এবং আমরা: Ami Ebong Amra (I and We) (February 1993)
10. মিসির আলির অমীমাংসিত রহস্য: Misir 'Alir Omimangshito Rohoshsho (Misir Ali's Unsolved Mystery) (February 1996)
11. হিমুর দ্বিতীয় প্রহর : Himu's second watch (February 1997) - crossover with Himu series.
12. আমিই মিসির আলি: Amiy Misir 'Ali (I'm Misir Ali) (February 2000)
13. বাঘবন্দি মিসির আলি: Baghbondi Misir Ali (Misir Ali Mousetrapped) (February 2001)
14. হরতন ইস্কাপন: Horton Ishkapon (Hearts and Spades) (February 2008)
15. মিসির আলির চশমা: Misir Alir Choshma (Misir Ali's Glasses) (February 2008)
16. কহেন কবি কালিদাস: Kohen Kabi Kalidash (So Says the Poet Kalidāsa) (February 2009)
17. তন্দ্রাবিলাস: Tondrabilash (Trance and Delirium) (February 2009)
18. মিসির আলি! আপনি কোথায়?: Misir Ali! Apni Kothai? (Misir Ali! Where Are You?) (February 2009)
19. মিসির আলি UNSOLVED: Misir Ali Unsolved (July 2009) - a collection of 8 short stories:
  1. সিন্দুক (The Safe) - about the childhood of Misir Ali
  2. Fruitfly
  3. সোনার মাছি (The Golden Fly)
  4. ছবি (The Portrait)
  5. রোগভক্ষক রউফ মিয়া (The Disease-Eater, Rawuf Miyaan)
  6. লিফট রহস্য (The Mystery of the Lift)
  7. হামা-ভূত (The Crawling Ghost)
  8. মাছ (Fish)
20. পুফি: Poofy (February 2011)
21. যখন নামিবে আঁধার: Jokhon Namibe Adhar (When Darkness Will Fall) (February 2012)
22. মিসির আলি ও অন্যান্য (Misir Ali & Others) - semi-fictional autobiographical short story

=== Omnibus ===
There are 3 omnibus editions of books that are available for the Misir Ali series.

- মিসির আলি অমনিবাস ১ (Misir Ali Omnibus 1): (February 1996)
- মিসির আলি অমনিবাস ২ (Misir Ali Omnibus 2): (February 2006)
- মিসির আলি অমনিবাস ৩ (Misir Ali Omnibus 3): (2013)

== Filmography ==
- অন্য ভুবনের ছেলেটি: Onno Bhuboner Cheleti (The Boy From Another World)
- তৃষ্ণা: Trishna (Thirst)
- নিষাদ: Nishad (Hunter or Niṣāda)
- বৃহন্নলা: Brihonnola (Eunuch)
- দেবী: Debi (Goddess)
- স্বপ্ন সঙ্গিনী: Swapno Sangini (Companion in Dream)

Other dramas

- চন্দ্র কারিগর (Lunar Craftsman) [short appearance]

== See also ==
- Debi, a Bengali film based on the novel by Humayun Ahmed with the same name, directed by Anam Biswas.
- Himu, Bengali character created by Humayun Ahmed
- Shuvro, Bengali character created by Humayun Ahmed
- Baker Bhai, Bengali character created by Humayun Ahmed
- Tuni, Bengali character created by Humayun Ahmed.
- Tara Tin Jon, Bengali characters created by Humayun Ahmed appearing in a series of dramas, portrayed by Dr.Ejajul Islam, Faruque Ahmed and Shadhin Khosru.
- Alauddiner Cherager Doitto, Bengali character created by Humayun Ahmed appearing in a series of dramas, portrayed by Jayanta Chattopadhyay.
- List of fictional psychiatrists
