= Naumi =

Naumi may refer to:

- Naumi Hospitality, a hotel chain headquartered in Singapore
- Zarin Tasnim Naumi, a Bangladeshi singer
- Ram naumi, a spring festival of Hinduism for celebrating the birthday of Lord Rama
