= Shuvro =

Character in Humayun Ahmed's novels

- Shuvro character
- The cover for Shuvro (শুভ্র) (2000), with a sketch of the character
- First appearance: Ekti Shada Gari
- Last appearance: Shuvro Geche Bone
- Created by: Humayun Ahmed
- Portrayed by: Riaz

In-universe information
- Nickname: Rafiul Islam Shuvro (addressed by friends)
- Gender: Male
- Occupation: Student (and later forced to become a Businessman)
- Family: Iajuddin / Motahar Shaheb (father); Rehana / Jahanara (mother)
- Spouse: Umme Habiba
- Significant others: Binu, Jori
- Nationality: Bangladeshi

Shuvro (Bengali: শুভ্র), sometimes transliterated as Shubhro or Śubhra, is a fictional character created by Bangladeshi writer Humayun Ahmed. Shuvro is one of Ahmed's recurring characters, who first appeared in the short story "Ekti Shada Gari" ("A White Car"). The character became popular, and Ahmed wrote six novels about Shuvro between 1990 and 2010, including Daruchini Dip (Cinnamon Island), which was adapted as a film in 2007 starring Riaz as Shuvro.

The character, whose name translates as "White", is meant to be a perfect spirit, set apart from the world. As Syed Monzur Morshed put it, Shuvro "is the 'white' of the mind, that is far from all the filth of the earth." He is seen by Bengali readers as a role model. However, Ahmed constantly tested Shuvro's pure spirit with new dilemmas and revelations; in the fourth book, titled simply Shuvro, the character discovers that his real mother is a prostitute, not the mother that he has known.

In 2017, Apurba Jahangir wrote, "Shuvro was Humayun Ahmed's attempt at writing about the purest human being—the ultimate boy next door. Though Shuvro was not a cult character much like Humayun's other famous creations such as Himu or Misir Ali — he had his own share of readers and fans. Shuvro was the go-to character when readers needed to be at peace. When one thinks of Shubhro, one thinks of him as the friend we go to when all else fails. Much like in the book Ei Shuvro! Ei — with using just the simplest words, he can portray life as the grand theatrical show it is."

Just before his death in 2012, Ahmed was working on a film adaptation of his 2010 novel Shuvro Has Gone to the Forest, and he cast actor Riaz in the title role as he really liked Riaz as Shuvro in Daruchini Dip. Ahmed died before work could begin on the film.

== Character ==
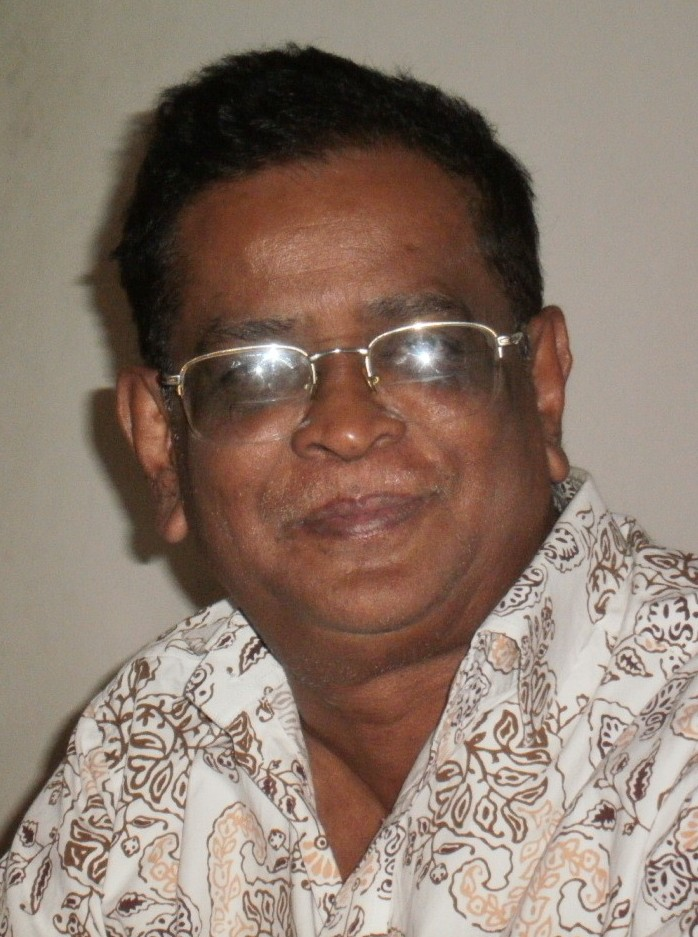
Humayun Ahmed, the creator of the character.

Shuvro is the only son of industrialist Iajuddin or in some stories, Mr. Motahar. His mother, Rehana or Jahanara, in some stories, is the only one with whom Shuvro has a real connection. Here, Ahmed gave us an ideal mother-son relationship. Once, Shuvro told his mother that, "If I would receive birth a million times, I would have told the Almighty, that I don't care about who I am born to, but each and every time, I should be sent to you." Shuvro is somewhat of a prince, his complexion is charming and just like other princes, he has many amenities.

Unlike other characters created by Humayun Ahmed, Shuvro changes from one book to another. The only common thing is his name, his thick-rimmed glasses, and his pure soul. He has a distant nature to be the bystander rather than the protagonist. He is not the masculine strong man who saves everyone, but he puts everything together with his own emotional sacrifice.

== Bibliography ==
- একটি সাদা গাড়ি: Ekti Shada Gari (A White Car)
- দারুচিনি দ্বীপ: Daruchini Dip (Cinnamon Island) (1990) ISBN 9844040027
- মেঘের ছায়া: Megher Chaya (The Shadow of the Clouds) (1993) ISBN 978-9844460140
- রূপালী দ্বীপ: Rupali Dip (Silvery Island) (1994) ASIN B008OPV0VQ
- শুভ্র: Shuvro (Shuvro) (2000) ISBN 9848160922
- এই শুভ্র! এই: Ei Shuvro! Ei (Hey Shuvro! Hey) (2003) ISBN 9848682600
- শুভ্র গেছে বনে: Shuvro Geche Bone (Shuvro Has Gone to the Forest) (2010) ISBN 9848685561

=== Anthology ===
- শুভ্র সমগ্র: Shuvro Samagra (Shuvro Anthology)

== Filmography ==
- Daruchini Dip

The 2007 film based on Ahmed's novel of the same name. It was directed by popular actor - director Tauquir Ahmed. Daruchini Dip stars Riaz, Dolly Johur,Fazlur Rahman Babu, Abul Hayat, Asaduzzaman Noor, Challenger, Rahmat Ali, Wahida Mollick Jolly and Abdullah al Mamun.

== See also ==
- Daruchini Dip, a Bengali film based on the novel with the same name, written by Humayun Ahmed. Directed by Tauquir Ahmed.
- Misir Ali, Bengali character created by Humayun Ahmed
- Himu, Bengali character created by Humayun Ahmed
- Baker Bhai, Bengali character created by Humayun Ahmed
- Tuni, Bengali character created by Humayun Ahmed.
- Tara Tin Jon, Bengali characters created by Humayun Ahmed appearing in a series of dramas, portrayed by Dr. Ejajul Islam, Faruque Ahmed and Shadhin Khosru.
- Alauddiner Cherager Doitto, Bengali character created by Humayun Ahmed appearing in a series of dramas, portrayed by Jayanta Chattopadhyay.

== Book Series ==
1. শুভ্র Series by Humayun Ahmed
2. দারুচিনি দ্বীপ (শুভ্র #1, দারুচিনি দ্বীপ #1)
3. মেঘের ছায়া (শুভ্র, #2)
4. রূপালী দ্বীপ (শুভ্র #3, দারুচিনি দ্বীপ #2 )
5. শুভ্র (শুভ্র, #4)
6. এই শুভ্র! এই (শুভ্র, #5)
7. শুভ্র গেছে বনে (শুভ্র, #6)
8. শুভ্র সমগ্র
