= Stacyville =

Stacyville may refer to:

- Stacyville, Iowa
- Stacyville, Maine
