= Labonno Chowdhury =

Bangladeshi actress and model

- লাবণ্য চৌধুরী
- Born: Chittagong, Bangladesh
- Citizenship: Bangladeshi
- Education: Monipur High School and College
- Occupations: Actress; model

Labonno Chowdhury is a Bangladeshi actress and model who works predominantly in Dhallywood cinema, Bangladeshi television drama. She made her acting debut in the feature film Krishnopokkho (2016).

== Early life ==
Chowdhury was born in Chittagong, Bangladesh. Her father's name is Advocate Mohammad Elius Chowdhury and mother's name is Subarna Sharmin Alo. She studied at Monipur High School and College. She had an interest in acting since childhood. When she was in class one, she got the opportunity to act in Chashi Nazrul Islam's film titled 'Amar Bangladesh'. But when Islam fell ill, it was no longer possible.

== Career ==
While studying in class one, Chowdhury got the opportunity to model in Gazi Shuvra's TV commercial 'Marks All Rounder'. She has also worked as a model in many other TV commercials of Shuvra.

Chowdhury made her debut as an actress in the feature film Krishnopokkho (2016), directed by Meher Afroz Shaon. She played the role of 'Priyodarshini', which was widely praised.

In 2017, Chowdhury was offered a role in Debi, directed by Anam Biswas and produced by Jaya Ahsan, which was released in 2018. Chowdhury played Ahsan's teenage role. For her role in the film Debi, Chowdhury got the opportunity to act in the film A Tale Of Two Sisters (Nokshi Kathar Jomin), where he again played Ahsan's teenage role.

Chowdhury then worked in Tanim Noor's feature film 'Bonolota Express', where she played the role of 'Ruby'.

== Filmography ==
=== Feature film ===
Key
†	Denotes films that have not yet been released

Year	Title	Role	Notes	Ref.
2016	Krishnopokkho	Priyodarshini / Sara	Child artist	
2018	Debi	Teenage Ranu	Child artist	
2022	Simana Periye	Lubna	Released on RTV Plus	
2023	Maa	Alamtara		
2023	Bongomata	Teenage Sheikh Hasina	Short film; based on the life of Sheikh Fazilatunnesa Mujib	
2024	Nakshi Kanthar Jamin: A Tale Of Two Sisters	Teenage Rahela		
2025	Dear Satyajit	Aparna		
2026	Bonolota Express	Ruby	Based on Humayun Ahmed's novel Kichukkhon	
2026	Mission D.D.L.J.	Diya	Debut in the lead role; released on iScreen	

=== Television ===
Year	Title	Role	Notes	Ref.
2021–2022	Friendbook	Tisha	Drama serial on NTV	
2022	Haradhoner Ekti Bagan	Shornalata	Telefilm on Channel i	
2022	Dubaiwala	Pori	Telefilm on GTV	
2024	Golam Mamun	Nabila	Series on Hoichoi	
2026	Headline	Anita	Series on Hoichoi	
