= Sabnam Faria =

Bangladeshi actress and model

- শবনম ফারিয়া
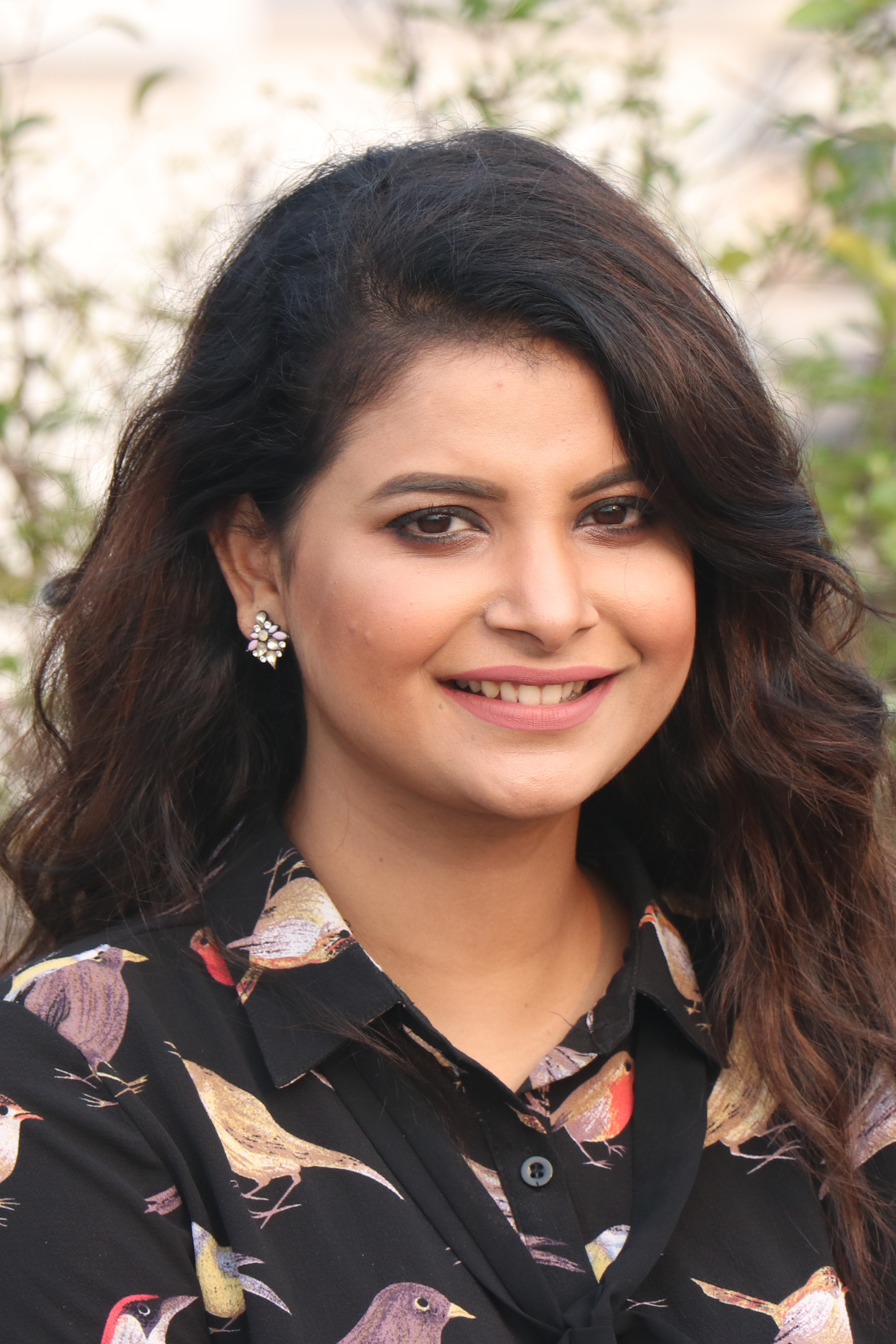
- Faria in 2017
- Born: Faria Sabnam Tripti; 14 March 1990 (age 36)
- Education: Eastern University
- Occupations: Actress, Model
- Years active: 2010–Present
- Spouse: Harunur Rashid (2018–2020 Tanzim Tayyab (m. 2025)
- Website: https://www.sabnamfaria.com/

Faria Sabnam Tripti (born 14 March 1990), known professionally as Sabnam Faria (Bengali:শবনম ফারিয়া) is a Bangladeshi film and drama actress and model, who appears in Bengali drama.

== Early life ==
Faria was born in Dhaka on 6 January 1990. She graduated with a degree in English from Eastern University. Her ancestral residence was in Mandartoli (Near Nouri Ahmmadia High School) village in North Upazila of Matlab, Chandpur. Her father was a doctor and mother is a housewife. Faria was married to Harunur Rashid Apu on 21 February 2019. The couple separated on 27 November 2020.

== Career ==
Faria started her career with television advertisement Pran Chanachur. In 2013, she made her acting debut in the Bengali drama All Time Dourer Upor.

=== Award ===
- Meril prothom alo award (best newcomer in movie )
- Babisas award ( best actress in supporting role for debi )
- Bachosas award ( best actress in supporting role for debi )
- CJFB award ( best actress in supporting role for debi )

=== Filmography ===
Year	Film	Language	Title	Director	Co-Actors	Ref.
2018	Debi	Bengali	Thriller	Anam Biswas	Jaya Ahsan, Chanchal Chowdhury, Iresh Zaker	
2021	Munshigiri	Bengali	Mystery	Amitabh Reza Chowdhury	Chanchal Chowdhury, Dilara Hanif Purnima	

=== Selected dramas ===
- All Time Dourer Upor - 2013
- Monkey Business
- Protikkha
- Debi
- Se Ase Fyre Fyre
- Digital Parrents
- Pronoy
- Golapi Ghuri
- Fandey Poria Boga Kande
- Premer Ronge Rangano
- Backbenchar
- Hing Ting Chot
- Bonolota
- Idiot
- Na Jogotik Na Puran
- Niyotir Muski Hashi
- Boiragir Gaan
- Bristider Bari
- Mister Jex
- Joriri Bibaho
- Honymoon Packeg
- Anar Koly
- Hok Kolorob
- Premer Rone Rangano
- Blask Verse
- Mr. And Mrs. Right
- Happy Ending
- Funny Video
- Hemonter Bristi
- Buk Vora Bhalobasha - 2019
- Shuborno Tithi - 2019
- Family Crisis - 2019

=== Web series ===
Year	Title	OTT	Character	Director	Notes
2021	Bilaap	Cinematic		Sunny Sanwar and Faisal Ahmed	a cinematic web series
2021	Tekka	Bioscope		Mehedi Hasan Tinku	
