= Debi (2018 film) =

Bangladeshi supernatural thriller film

- Theatrical release poster
- Directed by: Anam Biswas
- Screenplay by: Anam Biswas
- Based on: Debi by Humayun Ahmed
- Produced by: Jaya Ahsan
- Starring: Chanchal Chowdhury; Jaya Ahsan; Animesh Aich; Iresh Zaker; Sabnam Faria
- Cinematography: Kamrul Hasan Khosru
- Edited by: Sazal Alok
- Music by: Pritom Hasan; Anupam Roy
- Production company: C for Cinema (With sponsorship from Govt. of Bangladesh)
- Distributed by: Jaaz Multimedia
- Release date: 19 October 2018
- Running time: 106 Minutes
- Country: Bangladesh
- Language: Bengali
- Box office: ৳6 crore (equivalent to ৳9.2 crore or US$750,000 in 2024)

Debi : Misir Ali Prothombar (Note: or simply Debi; Bengali: দেবী, lit. 'Goddess') is a 2018 Bangladeshi supernatural thriller film based on Humayun Ahmed's novel of the same name. It was directed by Anam Biswas, starring Chanchal Chowdhury as Misir Ali, Jaya Ahsan, Iresh Zaker, Animesh Aich and Sabnam Faria. The film was produced by Jaya Ahsan and the government of Bangladesh as her first production from her production house C for Cinema. The film was released on 19 October 2018 with positive reviews from critics and was a box office hit .

== Plot ==
Set in 2018, the movie tells the story of Ranu, a middle-class housewife who is seemingly attached with some paranormal powers. After some strange circumstances, Her husband Anis, seeks help from Misir Ali, a psychiatrist and part-time professor in Dhaka University, to find an answer to her paranormal problems. At the same time, Nilu, the eldest daughter of Ranu's landlord and Misir Ali's student, becomes aware of an unknown person named Ahmed Sabet in Facebook and becomes curious to meet him.

Ranu tells Misir Ali about an accident of her childhood in which a corpse got stuck with her clothes while swimming in the river. To gather more information, Misir Ali travels to her village. However, it turns out that, that childhood memory is nothing but a mixture of many other incidents where Ranu never got stuck with a dead body. After a lot of research, Misir Ali finds out the truth - a local criminal once lured young Ranu in an abandoned temple and attempted to rape her. However, that failed because someone protected Ranu. Ranu's cousin also informs him about the future telling ability of Ranu which seems to appear after that incident. Misir Ali also learns that a beautiful goddess statue was stolen at the same time, which was thought to be haunted, because according to local legends, two girls were sacrificed to satisfy it. When Ranu is told about her dark past, she immediately remembers everything and replies that the man didn't lure her, she was already at the temple. Because she was attracted to the goddess statue and often played with it like a doll. She also reveals that the goddess protected her and till now, she's with her. Misir Ali doesn't believe this and tries to solve this case logically, but fails. On the other hand, the two daughters of the landlord, especially Nilu become close to Ranu. The relation between them evolves as the movie continues.

On Nilu's birthday, Ahmed Sabet sends a present with a love letter, in which he asks her to go on a date. Their date goes awkwardly, and it also appears that Sabet had lied to Nilu about his age. But on their way back home, Sabet cleverly kidnaps Nilu in his car.

In Sabet's torture cell, Nilu eventually learns that Sabet is a misogynist serial killer who brutally kills his victims by tricking them on social media.

At the same time, Ranu starts to sense strange omens and suddenly has a blurry vision of Saber's torture cell, in which Sabet is preparing to kill Nilu. She quickly informs others about Nilu's danger but unable to find her. As a last attempt to save Nilu, Ranu calls the goddess. This results in her becoming very sick and falling to her deathbed. The goddess saves Nilu by killing Sabet. But in the process, Ranu dies.

The movie then jumps a few days later, showing Misir Ali attending Ranu's funeral. There he accidentally meets Nilu and becomes shocked because her face and attitude are now the same as Ranu's, indicating that the goddess now stays with her.

== Cast ==
- Chanchal Chowdhury as Misir Ali
- Jaya Ahsan as Ranu
- Animesh Aich as Anis
- Iresh Zaker as Ahmed Sabet
- Sabnam Faria as Nilu
- Labonno Chowdhury as teenage Ranu

== Controversy ==
Humayun Ahmed's daughter Shila Ahmed said that the film didn't take permission of them to shoot.

Immediately before the film was made, a film "ESP: A film fantastic", in Bengali, "ESP: Ekti Rohoshshyo Golpo" (ESP: A Mystery Story) was made changing the name and religion of the character from the story of the same novel by Humayun Ahmed without mentioning the name of the writer, whereas Shibashish Roy's name was mentioned as the story writer, which was widely criticized in the Bangladeshi media after it was shown in Zee Bangla Cinema in August 2016. Meher Afroz Shaon, wife of Humayun Ahmed and proprietor of the story of Devi, and Jaya Ahsan, director of the film, protested against making the film without permission and without credit and Shaon wanted compensation for it. The film's director, Sekhar Das, assured that he did not know about it, and promised to look into the matter, and apologizes if confirmed.

== Awards ==
| Awards | Year | Award Section | Recipient | Result | Ref |
|---|---|---|---|---|---|
| Bachsas Awards | 2018 | Best Actress | Jaya Ahsan | Won | |
| Bachsas Awards | 2018 | Best Newcomer | Sabnam Faria | Won | |
| Bachsas Awards | 2018 | Best Director | Anam Biswas | Won | |
| Meril Prothom Alo Awards | 2018 | Best Actress | Jaya Ahsan | Won | |
| Meril Prothom Alo Awards | 2018 | Best Actor | Chanchal Chowdhury | Won | |
| Meril Prothom Alo Awards | 2018 | Best Newcomer | Sabnam Faria | Won | |
| Bangladesh National Film Awards | 2018 | Best Actress | Jaya Ahsan | Won | |
