= Lost on a Mountain in Maine =

Book by Donn Fendler

Lost on a Mountain in Maine (ISBN 0-688-11573-X) is a book written by Donn Fendler depicting his travel through the wilderness on Mt. Katahdin in Maine. Originally published in 1978, the book is written from his perspective as a young boy, Fendler told of his experience, from suffering hallucinations due to fatigue and hunger, as well as losing most of his clothing (including his trousers and shoes, which he attempted to throw across a stream, only to watch them float away in the water). In November 2011, it was republished as a young adult graphic novel.

A film adaptation of the book was released on November 1, 2024.
