= Headline (Bangladeshi TV series) =

- Poster
- Genre: Thriller-drama
- Screenplay by: Syed Ahmed Shawki; Ayman Asib Shadhin
- Story by: Syed Ahmed Shawki; Ayman Asib Shadhin
- Directed by: Saleh Sobhan Auneem
- Starring: Ziaul Faruq Apurba; Yash Rohan; Afsana Ara Bindu; Sarika Sabrin
- Country of origin: Bangladesh
- Original language: Bengali
- No. of seasons: 1
- No. of episodes: 8

Production
- Executive producer: Moshiour Rahman Ripon
- Producers: Syed Ahmed Shawki; Sakib R. Khan; Soumya Mukherjee
- Production location: Bangladesh
- Cinematography: Barkat Hossain Polash
- Editor: Saleh Sobhan Auneem
- Production company: Film Noir

Original release
- Network: Hoichoi
- Release: 25 June 2026

Headline is a 2026 Bangladeshi thriller drama web series directed by Saleh Sobhan Auneem and produced by Syed Ahmed Shawki, Sakib R. Khan and Soumya Mukherjee under the banner of Film Noir. It stars Ziaul Faruq Apurba, Yash Rohan, Afsana Ara Bindu, Sarika Sabrin, Farhana Hamid, Shamol Mawla, Ornil Birol, Raii Ranjonna, Intekhab Dinar. It was streaming on Hoichoi on 25 June 2026.

== Cast ==
- Ziaul Faruq Apurba
- Yash Rohan
- Afsana Ara Bindu
- Sarika Sabrin
- Farhana Hamid
- Shamol Mawla
- Ornil Birol
- Raii Ranjonna
- Intekhab Dinar

== Reception ==
=== Critical response ===
Masum Apu of Prothom Alo praised Headline for its realistic depiction of investigative journalism, press freedom, and corporate-political power dynamics, noting its departure from conventional thriller tropes. The lead performances by Ziaul Faruq Apurba and Yash Rohan were highlighted as the core of the series.

Utsa Ganguly of The Times of India awarded the series 2.5 out of 5 stars. The review commended the authentic 2006 Dhaka setting, central performances, and its depiction of corporate influence on press freedom, but criticized its predictable newsroom-thriller plot, slow pacing, and unresolved finale.
