= Rishta Laboni Shimana =

Bangladeshi model and actress

- রিশতা লাবণী সীমানা
- Born: 29 July 1985
- Died: 4 June 2024 (aged 38); Dhaka, Bangladesh
- Occupation(s): Actress, model
- Years active: 2006-2016
- Spouse: Parvez Sajjad (m. 2014) (divorced)
- Children: 2

Rishta Laboni Shimana (29 July 1985 – 4 June 2024) was a Bangladeshi actress and model. She started her career in the entertainment industry in 2006 through the Lux-Channel i Superstar competition. She gained acclaim for her performance in the film Daruchini Dwip (2007). She played the role of Kakli in the popular programme Sakin Sarisuri. She also started acting in dramas. She took a break from acting in 2016 due to motherhood and returned to the film industry in 2023 until her death in 2024.

== Career ==
In 2006, Seemaa made it to the top 10 of the reality show Lux Channel I Superstar. Since then she worked in numerous dramas and commercials. Her first film was Daruchini Dwip, directed by Tauquir Ahmed. She last acted in Roshni, directed by Biplob Haider.

== Filmography ==
Year	Title	Director	Notes
2007	Daruchini Dwip	Tauquir Ahmed	

== Personal life ==
Shimana married musician Parvez Sajjad in 2014. She took a break from the entertainment industry in 2016 due to motherhood. They had two children. The couple eventually divorced. Shimana married for the second time in 2019 and returned to the industry in 2023.

On 20 May 2024, she was admitted to a private hospital in Dhaka due to a brain haemorrhage. The next day, Seema was taken to another hospital in Dhanmondi for further treatment. She was then admitted to the National Institute of Neurosciences Hospital, where she underwent brain surgery. She was then transferred to Bangabandhu Sheikh Mujib Medical University, where she underwent tests and was put on life support as a last resort with ventilation. It was later reported that she died on 4 June at the age of 38.
