= Himu =

Himu (Bengali: হিমু) is a Bengali name. Notable people and characters with the name include:

- Himu (character), in novels by Humayun Ahmed
- Humaira Himu (1985–2023), Bangladeshi television and film actress
- Islam Mohamed Himu, Bangladeshi businessman
