= Krishnopokkho (film) =

- Theatrical release poster
- কৃষ্ণপক্ষ
- Directed by: Meher Afroz Shaon
- Written by: Humayun Ahmed
- Screenplay by: Meher Afroz Shaon
- Based on: Krishnopokkho by Humayun Ahmed
- Produced by: Faridur Reza Sagar
- Starring: Riaz; Ferdous Ahmed; Tania Ahmed; Wahida Mollick Jolly; Faruque Ahmed; Masud Akhond
- Music by: S.I. Tutul
- Production company: Impress Telefilm Limited
- Distributed by: Jaaz Multimedia
- Release dates: February 13, 2016 (Dhaka premiere); February 26, 2016 (Bangladesh)
- Running time: 141 minute
- Country: Bangladesh
- Language: Bengali

Krishnopokkho (Bengali: কৃষ্ণপক্ষ, "The Dark Lunar Fortnight") is a 2016 Bangladeshi Bengali language romance drama film based on novel of the same name written by Humayun Ahmed. The film's adapted screenplay was written and directed by Meher Afroz Shaon and starring Riaz, Tania Ahmed, Ferdous Ahmed, Wahida Mollick Jolly and Faruque Ahmed. This was the debut film by the director. The storyline revolves around two star-crossed lovers who are not destined to be together.

The film nationwide released on February 26, 2016, which was produced by Impress Telefilm Limited and distributed by Jaaz Multimedia The film had its closing premiere at the 11th Geneva International Oriental Film Festival (FIFOG) at the Grutli Theatre on April 17, 2016. In May 2016, the film had its opening premiere at 17th Rainbow Film Festival at London on May 29, 2016.

== Plot ==
Aru marries Muhib without the consent from any of the family. After marriage they go to Muhib's friend 's place. Muhib tries to manage a job for him while Aru's family thinks otherwise and the story turns into a new way.

The story revolves around the love story of Muhib and Oru, who are not together. Muhib grows up with his sister in his brother-in-law's house. Muhib and his sister come from a rural family. His sister married an elite, bourgeois man who is strict and robotic rather than human. His sister and brother-in-law have a daughter called Sara. The family seems well off, but lacks love and affection. Muhib is always afraid of his brother-in-law, who is fatherly in his rudeness and lacks any affection. When Muhib falls in love with Oru, he suddenly marries her without telling anyone. Even Oru's family didn't know. Soon after their wedding, Muhib's brother-in-law offered him a job out of town. On the way, he was involved in a terrible car accident that brought misfortune to everyone and changed the course of everyone's lives. Muhib's sister was shocked and spoke out against her husband for the first time, insulting him for his inhuman behaviour all her life. Meanwhile, Oru's family had already found her a husband and were unaware of her marriage to Muhib. When Oru was finally told about the accident, she couldn't help but reveal her secret marriage. At first it was thought that Oru's marriage to Muhib should never be revealed, as Oru needed to start a new life. But when Oru heard the news, she rushed to the hospital and wished to be Muhib's wife forever, waiting for him to come out of his coma.

== Cast ==
- Riaz as Muhib
- Ferdous Ahmed as Abrar
- Tania Ahmed as Zeba
- Wahida Mollick Jolly as Rahela
- Faruque Ahmed as Lina's Father
- Masud Akhond as Liyakat
- Moutushi Biswas as Miru
- Mahiya Mahi as Aru
- Azad Abul Kalam as Shafiq
- Kayes Chowdhury as Jamil Chowdhury
- Rafikullah Selim as Driver Mohsin
- Jhuna Chowdhury as Kazi Shaheb
- Arfan Ahmed as Bozlu
- Tarek Swapan
- Jayita Mahalanobish as Bozlu's Wife
- Ehsanur Rahman
- Ainun Putul as Lina's Mother
- Rimu Roja Khandaker as Moyna'r Ma
- Puja Cherry
- Labonno Chowdhury as Priyodarshini / Sara
- Tuktuki
- Tamim Iqbal
- Ariya
- Dr. Azad as Doctor-2
- Dr. Alamgir as Senior Doctor
- Mintu Sarder
- Motiul Alam Moti
- Babon
- Bipul
- Ebadul Islam Mehedi
- Nur-Nobi Chowdhury
- Emdad Khan Himu

Guest Appearance

- Jayanta Chattopadhyay as Zeba's Maternal Uncle
- Shadhin Khosru as Doctor-1

== Music ==
Krishnopokkho

Soundtrack album by S.I. Tutul
- Released: 2016
- Recorded: Azam Babu
- Genre: Feature Film Soundtrack
- Producer: Azam Babu

No.	Title	Singers	Length
1.	"Tin Number Bhuter Goli"	S.I. Tutul
2.	"Cholona Bristite Bhiji"	S.I. Tutul, Zarin Tasnim Naumi
3.	"Thikana Amar"	S.I. Tutul
4.	"Jodi Mon Kade Chole Esho"	Meher Afroz Shaon

== Release ==
Impress Telefilm Limited produced the film and handling its release with Jaaz Multimedia. The film premiered on February 26, 2016, after an invitation-only screening on February 13, 2016, at the Balaka Cineworld, Dhaka. On March 23, 2016, the film released in Singapore. The film premiered on April 17, 2016, at the 11th Geneva International Oriental Film Festival in Switzerland. On April 22, 2016, the film premiered in France as the title Le Sombre Quinzaine and on May 21, 2016, in the United States.

== Awards ==
- Bangladesh National Film Awards 2016
  - Best Actress in a Supporting Role
  - Best Female Playback Singer
