= Baker Bhai =

Bangladeshi TV series character

Baker Bhai বাকের ভাই
- Kothao Keu Nei character
- First appearance: Kothao Keu Nei (Book: 1992)
- Last appearance: Kothao Keu Nei ( 1993 – 1994)
- Created by: Humayun Ahmed
- Portrayed by: Asaduzzaman Noor
- Friends: Bodi; Mojnu

In-universe information
- Nickname: Baker
- Gender: Male
- Occupation: Gangster, Outlaw
- Spouse: Unmarried
- Significant other: Muna
- Religion: Islam
- Nationality: Bangladeshi

Baker Bhai (Bengali: বাকের ভাই lit. "Brother Bāker") is the lead character in a popular Bangladeshi television series called Kothao Keu Nei. The character is portrayed by Bangladeshi actor Asaduzzaman Noor. The show was created by Humayun Ahmed in 1990.

== Character ==
Baker (Asaduzzaman Noor) is portrayed as a local gangster who patrols the streets with his two companions, Bodi (Abdul Kader) and Mojnu (Lutfur Rahman George). As the leader of this small motorcycle gang, Baker Bhai skirts the edges of society, living just outside the law and outside of mainstream society. Although a rogue, gangster and rebellious spirit, he is known as a fair and just individual who won't hesitate to step in and correct an injustice or to come to the aid of the defenseless.

During the course of the drama, Baker Bhai endears himself to a woman named Muna (Suborna Mustafa), who initially disrespects him as a common thug, but eventually succumbs to his roguish charms and his sense of justice and develops feelings for him. As the head of a gang, Baker Bhai has to juggle the many competing claims to his turf. This and his readiness to come to the defense of the victimized get him in a series of serious conflicts and dangerous situations. In the end, he is betrayed by one of his own friends and is hanged on a charge of murder despite being innocent. Baker Bhai forgave his betrayer before his execution.

== Reception ==
The series was so popular in Bangladesh, and the character of Baker Bhai so beloved, that mass street protests took place when it was learned that the character would be sentenced to be hanged. Protesters gathered in the thousands and threatened to retaliate if the television station, Bangladesh Television, didn't reverse this decision. The station, however, didn't change their plans and the series ended with beloved Baker Bhai's death.

== Filmography ==
- Kothao Keu Nei

== See also ==
- Kothao Keu Nei, a Bangladeshi television series based on the novel with the same name, written by Humayun Ahmed. Directed by Mohammad Barkatullah.
- Misir Ali, Bengali character created by Humayun Ahmed.
- Himu, Bengali character created by Humayun Ahmed.
- Shuvro, Bengali character created by Humayun Ahmed.
- Tuni, Bengali character created by Humayun Ahmed.
