= Himu (character) =

Character of Bengali literature

- Himu character
- Himu, as depicted on the cover of the book Himu (1993)
- First appearance: Mayurakkhi (1990)
- Last appearance: Himu ebong Harvard Ph.D. Boltu bhai (2011)
- Created by: Humayun Ahmed
- Portrayed by: Fazlul Kabir Tuhin; Asaduzzaman Noor

In-universe information
- Full name: Himalay
- Gender: Male
- Occupation: Unemployed, vagabond
- Spouse: Unmarried
- Significant other: Rupa
- Relatives: Majeda Khala (aunt); Rahmat Ullah Talukder (uncle); Fatema khala (aunt); Badal (cousin); Jahir (cousin); Rinku (cousin)
- Nationality: Bangladeshi

Himu or Himaloy (Bengali: হিমু or হিমালয়) is a fictional character created by the Bangladeshi writer Humayun Ahmed who appears in a disjunct series of novels. The character first appeared in the novel titled Mayurakkhi published in 1990.

== Character ==
The real name of the character is Himalay, a name given by his father. He follows a lifestyle that was instructed by his psychopathic father who wanted him to be a great man (Bengali: মহাপুরুষ).

Himu wears a yellow panjabi that does not have a pocket and lives a mostly nomadic life. He walks barefoot on the streets of Dhaka without a certain destination. He does not have a job and, therefore, no source of income. He prefers the life of a beggar to that of a hard worker, often praising begging. The charterer is decidedly eccentric and unorthodox in outlook.

In winter, he wears a Kashmiri shawl, gifted by his girl friend Rupa. His hair and beard are naturally long. He walks around at night. His cousin Badal is his blind devotee. He is unconvinced of his spiritual powers and tries to follow him. Himu predicts events which often come true. He acts according to his laws and regulations, and misleads. Himu is often seen doing good deeds (although there is some confusion mixed in).

He has a large number of followers for his spiritual power of predicting future events of anyone, including those of police officers, beggars, neighbors, relatives, and tea stall proprietors. Most of the time he indifferently speaks unpleasant truth about the person with whom he talks.

Himu unlike the atheist psychology Professor Misir Ali argues that the beliefs make things happen, not inspecting or asking questions. This aspect of him makes him a person who lives by the magical side of the world, not using logic.

There are 21 novels about Himu. Five others are Himu-based.

== Bibliography ==
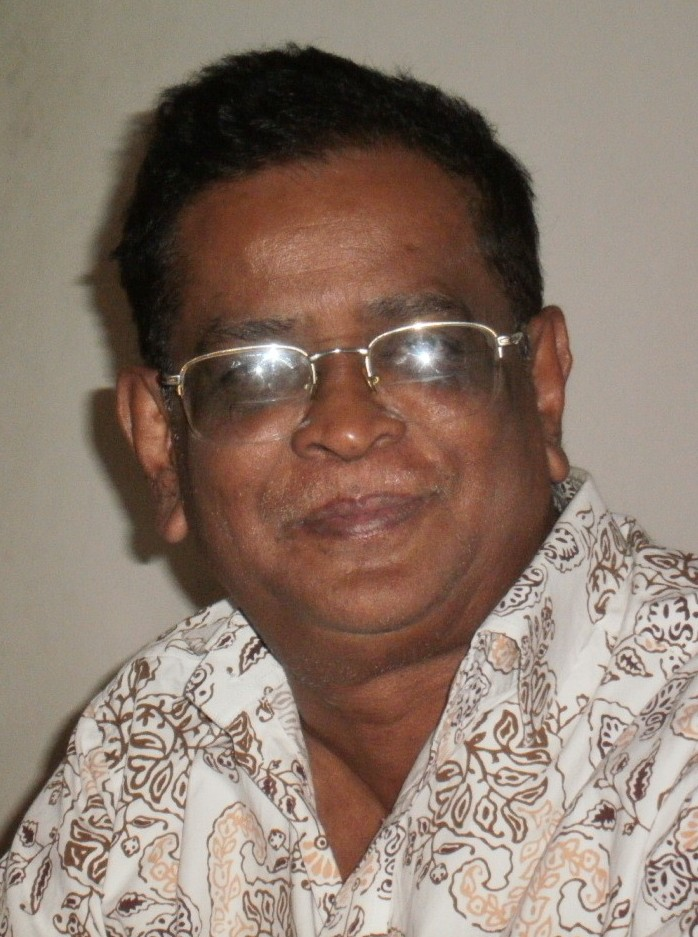
Humayun Ahmed, the creator of the character.

1. ময়ূরাক্ষী: Mayurakkhi (Peafowl Eyes). Anannya. 1990.
2. দরজার ওপাশে: Darajar opashey (On The Other Side of The Door). 1992.
3. হিমু: Himu. 1993.
4. পারাপার: Āhameda, Humāẏaūna (1994). Pārāpāra (The Crossing). Anya Prakash. ISBN 978-9848683675.
5. এবং হিমু ...: Āhameda, Humāẏūna (1995). And Himu... Samaẏa Prakāśana. ISBN 978-9844580985.
6. হিমুর হাতে কয়েকটি নীলপদ্ম: Himur Haate koyekti Neelpadmo (Some blue Lotuses in Himu's hand). 1996.
7. হিমুর দ্বিতীয় প্রহর: Āhameda, Humāẏūna (1997). (Himu's Second Morning). Kākalī Prakāśanī. ISBN 978-9844371453. - a crossover with Misir Ali
8. হিমুর রূপালী রাত্রি: Himur Rupali Ratri (The silver night of Himu). 1998. ISBN 978-9848485057.
9. একজন হিমু কয়েকটি ঝিঁ ঝিঁ পোকা: Ekjon Himu Koyekti Jhin Jhin Poka (A Himu and some Crickets). 1999.
10. তোমাদের এই নগরে: Āhameda, Humāẏūna (2000). Tomader Ei Nagore (In your city). Ananyā. ISBN 978-9844121171.
11. চলে যায় বসন্তের দিন: Āhameda, Humāẏūna (2002). Chole Jay Basonter Din (The days of spring are passing by). Anyaprakāśa. ISBN 978-9848681763.
12. সে আসে ধীরে: Āhameda, Humāẏūna (2003). Se Ase Dheere (He approaches slowly). Anyaprakāśa. ISBN 978-9848682531.
13. আঙুল কাটা জগলু: Āhameda, Humāẏūna (2005). Angul Kata Jaglu (Fingerless Jaglu). Kākalī Prakāśanī. ISBN 978-9844373266.
14. হলুদ হিমু কালো র‍্যাব: Āhameda, Humāẏūna (2006). Holud Himu Kalo Rab (Yellow Himu, Black RAB). Anyaprakāśa. ISBN 978-9848683965.
15. আজ হিমুর বিয়ে: Aaj Himur Biye (Today is Himu's wedding). Anyaprokash. 2007. ISBN 978-9848684153.
16. হিমু রিমান্ডে: Himu Remande (Himu is in Custody). Anyaprokash. 2008. ISBN 978-9848684641.
17. হিমুর মধ্যদুপুর: Himur Modhodupur (The mid afternoon of Himu). Annesha. 2009.
18. হিমুর নীল জোছনা: Himur Neel Jotsna (The moonlit night of Himu). Anyaprokash. 2010. ISBN 978-9848685938.
19. হিমুর আছে জল: Himur Ache Jol (Himu has water). Anyaprokash. 2011. ISBN 978-9845020015.
20. হিমু এবং একটি রাশিয়ান পরী: Himu Ebong Ekti Russian Pori (Himu and a Russian fairy). Gyanakosha. 2011. ISBN 978-9848933602.
21. হিমু এবং হার্ভার্ড Ph.D. বল্টুভাই: Himu Ebong Harvard Ph.D. Boltu Bhai (Himu and Harvard Ph.D brother Boltu). Anyaprokash. 2011. ISBN 978-9845020428.

=== Other Himu-related books ===
1. হিমু মামা: Himu Mama (Uncle Himu). 2004.
2. হিমুর একান্ত সাক্ষাৎকার ও অন্যান্য: Himur Ekanto Shakhkhatkar O Onnanno (Himu's exclusive interview and others). 2008.
3. হিমুর বাবার কথামালা: Himur Babar Kothamala (Words of Himu's father). Annesha. 2009.
4. ময়ূরাক্ষীর তীরে: Moyurakkhir Tire (At the bank of Moyurakkhi). 2011.
5. আজ রবিবার: Aaj Robibar (It's Sunday)

== Filmography ==
- Aaj Robibar (1996)
- Himu (1994)

== See also ==
- Misir Ali, Bengali character created by Humayun Ahmed
- Shuvro, Bengali character created by Humayun Ahmed
- Baker Bhai, Bengali character created by Humayun Ahmed
- Tuni, Bengali character created by Humayun Ahmed
- Tara Tin Jon, Bengali characters created by Humayun Ahmed appearing in a series of dramas, portrayed by Dr.Ejajul Islam, Faruque Ahmed and Shadhin Khosru
