= Munshigiri =

2021 film by Amitabh Reza Chowdhury

- Bengali: মুন্সিগিরি
- Directed by: Amitabh Reza Chowdhury
- Written by: Shibabrata Barman
- Screenplay by: Naseef Amin
- Based on: Mriterao Kotha Bole by Shibabrata Barman
- Produced by: Redoan Rony; Md Assaduzzaman
- Starring: Chanchal Chowdhury; Dilara Hanif Purnima; Sabnam Faria
- Cinematography: Tuhin Tamijul
- Edited by: Iqbal Kabir
- Music by: Jahid Nirob
- Production companies: Chorki; Half Stop Down
- Distributed by: Chorki
- Release date: 30 September 2021
- Running time: 85 minutes
- Country: Bangladesh
- Language: Bengali
- Budget: 7 Million

Munshigiri (Bengali: মুন্সিগিরি Munsigiriḥ) is a Bangladeshi mystery drama film directed by Amitabh Reza Chowdhury from a script by Naseef Amin for Chorki. Based on the novel Mriterao Kotha Bole by Shibabrata Barman, it stars Chanchal Chowdhury as Masood Munshi, Dilara Hanif Purnima as Suraiya Akhter, and Sabnam Faria as Parveen Sultana. It was released via Chorki on 30 September 2021.

This is going to be the first installment of the trilogy franchise Munshigiri. It is a character-driven franchise and Masood Munshi is the protagonist played by Chanchal Chowdhury. The story revolves around Munshi, who is an Additional Deputy Police Commission (ADC) from the detective branch (DB) of Bangladesh Police. The story revolves around how he deals with his personal and professional life.

Munshigiri has been produced by Chorki in association with Half Stop Down (Producer Md Assaduzzaman with Mahjabin Reza Chowdhury) and presented by Daraz.

== Premise ==
After the sensational 'Titas Gas Employee Murder' case was handed to the Detective Branch of the Police, the investigation was handed over to Masood Munshi, ADC of the detective branch. Masood Munshi, in collaboration with his wife Parveen Sultana, uses his old method of revealing secrets. The story of secret revenge. It is a breathtaking story about the involvement of Ishtiaq Mirza, the accused writer in the murder case.

— Chorki

== Cast ==
- Chanchal Chowdhury – Masood Munshi
- Dilara Hanif Purnima – Suraiya Akter
- Sabnam Faria – Parveen Sultana
- Gazi Rakayet – Ishtiaque Mirza
- Shahiduzzaman Selim – Additional Police Commissioner
- Khandaker Lenin – Bipin
- Kazi Anisul Haque Borun – Khorshed
- Imtiaz Barshon – Ali Akbar
- Tasnia Rahman – Sharmili Anwar
- Ashoke Bepari – Idris Mawla
- Ahsan Habib Nasim – ADC Wahid

== Production ==
This is the first time, any Bangladeshi-origin detective story is going to be adopted into a film. The director has waited two years to make this film. And the director and producers have the plan to make two more sequels to this film. Chorki announced Munshigiri on 15 January 2021. On the same day it was announced that Naseef Amin would write a script based on the novel Mriterao Kotha Bole by Shibabrata Barman, and Chanchal Chowdhury and Dilara Hanif Purnima were cast in the lead roles. On 28 January 2021, Sabnam Faria joined the cast of the film. Filming began on 15 February 2021.

In an interview with Sara Fairuz Zaima director Amitabh Reza Chowdhury said that principal photography had taken place in Karwan Bazar, Bakshi Bazar, Bangla Bazar, and different other locations in Dhaka. He also added that filming had been interrupted three times due to COVID-19 breakout related lockdown in Bangladesh.

== Release ==
On 28 September 2021, the trailer of Munshigiri was released on social media by Chorki. On 30 September 2021, the film was released digitally worldwide via Chorki.

== Reception ==
Siffat Bin Ayub of The Business Standard rated Munshigiri 7 out of 10 and praises its cinematography. In his review for The Financial Express, Shadya Naher Sheyam described Munshigiri as "The growth and treatment of mystery in the novel and cinema differ greatly. Even though some minor plot holes popped up, the deviation that took place between the mediums is handled in a subtle way".
