= Lost on a Mountain in Maine (film) =

- Theatrical release poster
- Directed by: Andrew Boodhoo Kightlinger
- Written by: Luke Paradise
- Based on: Lost on a Mountain in Maine by Donn Fendler
- Produced by: Sylvester Stallone; Braden Aftergood; Dick Boyce; Ryan B. Cook
- Starring: Luke David Blumm; Paul Sparks; Caitlin FitzGerald
- Cinematography: Idan Menin
- Edited by: Andrew Drazek
- Music by: Garth Stevenson
- Production companies: Balboa Productions; Mom & Dad Production; Great Mountain
- Distributed by: Blue Fox Entertainment
- Release dates: July 13, 2024 (Maine International Film Festival); November 1, 2024 (United States)
- Running time: 98 minutes
- Country: United States
- Language: English
- Box office: $1,181,354

Lost on a Mountain in Maine is a 2024 American adventure drama survival film written by Luke Paradise, directed by Andrew Kightlinger and starring Luke David Blumm as Donn Fendler. It is based on Fendler's book of the same name.

== Plot ==
The film tells the inspiring story of 12-year-old boy Donn Fendler, separated from his family by a fast-moving storm, must fight to stay alive during his nine-day adventure lost in the backwoods of Maine.

== Cast ==
- Luke David Blumm as Donn Fendler
- Paul Sparks as Mr. Donald Fendler
- Caitlin FitzGerald as Mrs. Ruth Fendler
- Griffin Wallace Henkel as Ryan Fendler
- Ethan Slater as Henry
- Bates Wilder as Lead Ranger
- Mason Cufari as Tommy Fendler

== Production ==
=== Filming ===
The film was shot in summer 2022 in Ulster County, New York and Baxter State Park. Scenes were filmed on Mount Katahdin.

== Release ==
=== Theatrical ===
The film premiered at the Maine International Film Festival on July 14, 2024. Then, it was released in theaters on November 1, 2024.

=== Home media ===
It was released on digital and on demand on January 7, 2025, and the DVD was released on March 11, 2025.

== Reception ==
=== Critical response ===
On the review aggregator website Rotten Tomatoes, 53% of 15 critics' reviews are positive.

Alex Saveliev of Film Threat scored the film a 6 out of 10 writing in his review consensus section: "jaded, cynical folks like me may wish for a little more grit and a few more bold, unexpected turns." Joe Leydon of Variety gave the film a positive review and wrote, “Despite its predictability and stretches of pokey pacing, director Andrew Boodhoo Kightlinger’s drama remains engrossing throughout.”

== See also ==
- Survival film
- List of adventure films of the 2020s
- List of drama films of the 2020s
