= Daruchini Dwip =

2007 film by Tauquir Ahmed

- DVD cover
- Directed by: Tauquir Ahmed
- Written by: Humayun Ahmed
- Based on: Daruchini Dwip (Novel) by Humayn Ahmed
- Starring: Riaz; Zakia Bari Momo; Mosharraf Karim; Emon; Bindu; Munmun; Abul Hayat; Afroza Banu
- Cinematography: A R Swapan
- Edited by: Atish Dey Sarkar
- Music by: S I Tutul
- Production company: Impress Telefilm
- Distributed by: Channel i
- Release date: 31 August 2007
- Running time: 126 minutes
- Country: Bangladesh
- Language: Bengali

Daruchini Dwip (lit. 'The Cinnamon Island') (Bengali: দারুচিনি দ্বীপ) is a Bangladeshi Bengali-language film. It was released on 31 August 2007 throughout Bangladesh. The film is based on the Bangladeshi novelist and filmmaker Humayun Ahmed’s popular novel of the same name. It was directed by popular actor - director Tauquir Ahmed. Daruchini Dwip stars Riaz, Fazlur Rahman Babu, the award-winning Zakia Bari Momo, Abul Hayat, Asaduzzaman Noor, Dolly Johur, Challenger, Rahmat Ali, Wahida Mollick Jolly and Abdullah al Mamun. The film marks the debut film of Momo, Emon, Bindu, and Munmun.

The film was appreciated by film critics and won the National Film Award of Bangladesh Best Film of the Year 2007 and was nominated in seven categories also won all of them. It also won Best Foreign Language Film at the 2010 Bali International Film Festival Awards in Indonesia.

== Plot ==
A team of young men and women in their 20s plan to go on a big trip across Bangladesh. The main protagonist of the film is Shuvro. They all hail from the mega city of Dhaka. In Bangladesh, being a conservative country, it is not common to the sight of a group consisting of both young, single men and women traveling together. Yet in this story, the women are seen to try to make it against the stream. Each had a different destination in mind: like Sundarban, Cox's Bazar, St. Martin's Island and many more places. Finally they decide to go to Daruchini Dwip. Shuvro (Riaz) has a big problem for his weak eyesight because he may be put out from the program. But finally the full team goes on a train with Shuvro.

== Cast ==
- Riaz – Shuvro
- Zakia Bari Momo – Jori
- Mosharraf Karim – Ayon / Boltu
- Emon – Shonju
- Bindu – Anushka
- Munmun – Muna
- Rishta Laboni Shimana
- Sabrina Shafi Nisa
- Abul Hayat – Shonju's father
- Afroza Banu – Shonju's mother Farida
- Abdullah al Mamun – Shuvro's father
- Dolly Johur – Shuvro's mother
- Rahmat Ali – Jori's uncle
- Shirin Alam – Jori's aunt
- Asaduzzaman Noor – Anushka's father
- Fazlur Rahman Babu – Monir
- Challenger – Jori's father
- Wahida Mollick Jolly – Jori's mother

== Awards and achievement ==
=== International awards ===
- Winner Best Foreign Language Film: Bali International Film Festival Awards 2010 Indonesia.

=== National Film Awards ===
Daruchini Dwip won the National Film Awards total seven categories in the year of 2007.

- Winner Best Film 'Impress Telefilm Ltd.' 2007
- Winner Best Actor: 'Riaz' 2007
- Winner Best Actress: 'Zakia Bari Momo' 2007
- Winner Best Music Director 'S I Tutul' 2007
- Winner Best Choreographer: 'Kabirul Islam Ratan' 2007
- Winner Best Side Role Actor: 'Abul Hayat' 2007
- Winner Best Scriptwriter: 'Humayun Ahmed' 2007

== Music ==
Daruchini Dwip

Soundtrack album by S I Tutul
- Released: 2000
- Recorded: 2000
- Genre: Feature film soundtrack
- Producer: Impress Telefilm Ltd.

The music for Daruchini Dwip was directed by S I Tutul.

=== Soundtrack ===
Track	Titles	Artist(s)	Composer(s)	Lyricist(s)
1	Dur Dwipobashini	Samina Chowdhury and Fahmida Nabi	Kazi Nazrul Islam	Kazi Nazrul Islam
2	Mon Chay Mon Chay	S I Tutul Bappa Mazumdar Fahmida Nabi Dinat Jahan Munni	S I Tutul and Samina Chowdhury	Kabir Bakul
3	Amar Mon Kemon Kore	Fahmida Nabi	Rabindranath Tagore	Rabindranath Tagore
