= Mission D.D.L.J. =

- Poster
- Directed by: Asif Jahangir Arko
- Screenplay by: Asif Jahangir Arko; Azharul Islam Ovi
- Story by: MKA Tushar
- Produced by: Faridur Reza Sagar
- Starring: Saad Salmi Naovi; Labonno Chowdhury; Masud Mohiuddin; Swapna Sheikh
- Cinematography: Bishawjit Datta
- Edited by: Mahfuzul Haque Ashique
- Production companies: Impress Telefilm iScreen
- Distributed by: iScreen; Channel i
- Release date: 25 September 2026
- Country: Bangladesh
- Language: Bengali

Mission D.D.L.J. is a 2026 Bangladeshi romantic comedy film directed by Asif Jahangir Arko and produced by Faridur Reza Sagar under the banner Impress Telefilm and iScreen. It stars Saad Salmi Naovi and Labonno Chowdhury play the lead roles and Masud Mohiuddin, Swapna Sheikh, Sharmin Sultana Sharmi, Sadia Islam Jui, Arman Mahmud, Shawkat Shovon and others are also part of the cast.

The film received international acclaim at the New York International Film Award (NYIFA), winning three awards in the three categories as Best Comedy Film, Best Romantic Film and Asif Jahangir Arko won the Best Director - Feature Film award.

== Cast ==
- Saad Salmi Naovi as Dhrubo
- Labonno Chowdhury as Diya
- Arman Bin Mahmud as Siyam
- Sadia Islam Jui as Rinki
- Shawkat Shovon as Jafor
- Asif Jahangir Arko as Wedding Photographer
- Masud Mohiuddin as Father
- Shopna Sheikh as Mother
- Sharmin Sultana Shormi as Beauty Aunty
- Neon Ahsan as Horse Cart Passenger

== Release ==
The film premiered on the OTT platform iScreen on 25 September 2026.

In October 2026, the film was featured in a special campus screening organized by the AIUB Film Club at the American International University-Bangladesh (AIUB).

== Reception ==
Mokful Hossain of Prothom Alo praised the natural chemistry between lead actors Saad Naovi and Labonno Chowdhury in their debut on-screen collaboration. A critic of Shomoyer Alo praised the emotional and humorous twists in the journey of characters Dhruba and Diya. Mokful Hossain of Muktokontho highlighted that the 85-minute project features a fresh lead pairing with Saad Naovi and Labonno Chowdhury. Channel i reported that, a grand premiere of the film was held at Star Cineplex in Bashundhara City, Dhaka, attended by the film's cast, crew, and prominent entertainment figures. The premiere received an enthusiastic response from attendees and celebrities who praised the film as an entertaining feel-good romantic comedy blending family drama and nostalgia.

== Awards and nominations ==
| Award | Category | Winner | Result | Ref. |
|---|---|---|---|---|
| New York International Film Awards | Best Comedy Film | Mission DDLJ | Won | |
| New York International Film Awards | Best Romance Film | Mission DDLJ | Won | |
| New York International Film Awards | Best Director (feature film) | Asif Jahangir Arko | Won | |
