= Donn Fendler =

American lost child (1926–2016)

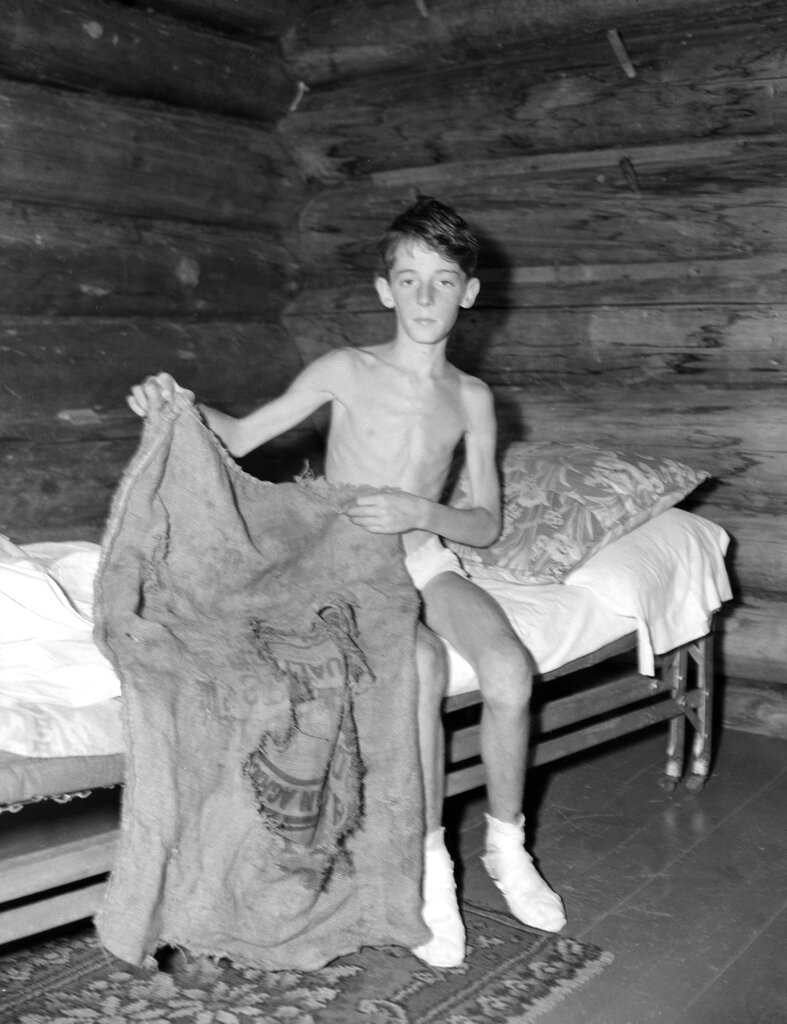
- Fendler in 1939
- Born: Donn Charles Fendler; August 29, 1926; Rye, New York, U.S.
- Died: October 10, 2016 (aged 90); Bangor, Maine, U.S.
- Known for: Lost child found in Mount Katahdin
- Spouse: Maryrose Connolly (m. 1953; died 2009)
- Children: 4

Donn Charles Fendler (August 29, 1926 – October 10, 2016) was an American author and public speaker. Born in Rye, New York, Fendler, at the age of 12, became separated from his family and was lost on Maine's Mount Katahdin in July 1939. His disappearance launched a search party, which became headline news throughout the United States. Donn survived for nine days without food or proper clothing, before following a stream and telephone line out of the woods near Stacyville, Maine. Fendler was dehydrated, covered with insect bites, and 16 pounds lighter than at the beginning of his odyssey, but otherwise unharmed. He credited his experience as a Boy Scout in helping him survive the ordeal.

== Biography ==
Donn Fendler was born on August 29, 1926, in Rye, New York.

On July 17, 1939, 12-year-old Fendler was separated from his family during a storm near the summit of Maine's Mount Katahdin. His disappearance led to hundreds of volunteers conducting a search party to find him throughout Baxter State Park. Fendler survived for nine days without proper food or clothing before following a stream and telephone line out of the woods near Stacyville, Maine. He stumbled into a hunting camp 35 miles (56 km) from the place he had gone missing. Fendler was dehydrated, covered with insect bites, and 16 pounds (7 kg) lighter than at the beginning of his odyssey, but otherwise unharmed. He credited his experience as a Boy Scout in helping him survive by remembering that he should follow the stream downhill, eating what he could find, and attempting to shield himself as best as possible during the frigid nights.

Shortly after, Fendler co-authored a memoir about his journey, Lost on a Mountain in Maine with Joseph B. Egan. Written from his perspective as a young boy, Fendler told of his experience, from suffering hallucinations due to fatigue and hunger, as well as losing most of his clothing (including his trousers and shoes, which he attempted to throw across a stream, only to watch them float away in the water). After his rescue, U.S. President Franklin D. Roosevelt presented him with the Army & Navy Legion of Valor's annual medal for outstanding youth hero of 1939. Fendler was feted with a parade in his honor, and his story was featured in the August 7, 1939, edition of Life magazine. For almost seventy years, he was called on to recount his story.

On the 70th anniversary of the event, Fendler was interviewed by the Bangor Daily News, in which he stated that he survived not only by eating strawberries and checkerberries, but by his "never-give-up attitude" through his faith in God and his prayers. He also added, "Mothers from all over the United States sent prayers to his mother by Western Union. They did that in those days. I think it worked, because I am still standing here." In September 1998, a map was published with the trail he had followed. In November 2011, it was republished as a young adult graphic novel.

== Personal life and death ==
In 1953, Fendler married to Maryrose Connolly; the couple had four children. Fendler died on October 10, 2016, in Bangor, Maine at the age of 90. At the time of his death, he had been living in Clarksville, Tennessee but spending his summers in Newport, Maine. Each autumn, he visited schools in Maine to tell his story and answer children's questions about his experience on the mountain.

On July 25, 2014, on the 75th anniversary of the day Fendler was finally found, Paul LePage, then-Governor of Maine, declared it was "Donn Fendler Day."

A film adaptation of the book Lost on a Mountain in Maine was released on November 1, 2024.
