= Bonolota Express (film) =

2026 Bangladeshi film by Tanim Noor

- Film poster
- Bengali: বনলতা এক্সপ্রেস
- Directed by: Tanim Noor
- Screenplay by: Ayman Asib Shadhin; Samiul Bhuiyan
- Story by: Humayun Ahmed
- Based on: Kichukkhon by Humayun Ahmed
- Produced by: Tanim Noor
- Starring: Mosharraf Karim; Chanchal Chowdhury; Sariful Razz; Sabila Nur; Shyamol Mawla; Azmeri Haque Badhon; Zakia Bari Momo; Intekhab Dinar; Shamima Nazneen; Labonno Chowdhury
- Narrated by: Nuhash Humayun
- Cinematography: Barkat Hossain Polash
- Edited by: Saleh Sobhan Auneem
- Music by: Jahid Nirob
- Production companies: Buriganga Talkies; Hoichoi Studios; Dope Production
- Release date: 21 March 2026 (Bangladesh)
- Running time: 153 minutes
- Country: Bangladesh
- Language: Bengali
- Budget: ৳4 crore (US$330,000)
- Box office: ৳25 crore (US$2.0 million)

Bonolota Express (Bengali: বনলতা এক্সপ্রেস) is a Bangladeshi adventure-black comedy film directed and produced by Tanim Noor under the banner of Buriganga Talkies, in association with Hoichoi Studios and Dope Productions. The film is based on Humayun Ahmed's novel Kichukkhon, with an ensemble cast consisting of Mosharraf Karim, Chanchal Chowdhury, Sariful Razz, Sabila Nur, Shamol Mawla, Azmeri Haque Badhon, Zakia Bari Momo, Intekhab Dinar, Shamima Nazneen, Labonno Chowdhury, Tridha Paul Maan, Tamim Kareem and Sifat Rahman.

Principal photography begun in December 2025 with filming taking place in BFDC. Screenplay and dialogues were written by Ayman Asib Shadhin and Samiul Bhuiyan, edited by Saleh Sobhan Auneem, cinematography by Barkat Hossain Polash, and music composed by Sayba Talukder.

The film was released on March 21, 2026 in the theaters of Bangladesh coinciding with Eid al-Fitr 2026. (Note: Some sources list the release as Eid-ul-Fitr 2025, likely an error given the October 2025 announcement date; Eid-ul-Fitr 2025 occurred on 31 March 2025. The film received positive reviews from critics & audiences, with praise for its performances (especially Mosharraf Karim, Sariful Razz, Shamima Nazneen), storytelling, soundtrack, and technical aspects) The film became a critical and commercial success, earning widespread acclaim from both critics and audience. It is currently the highest grossing Bangladeshi film of 2026 as well as one of the highest grossing Bangladeshi films of all time. The film won the 5th BIFA Awards in Best Film category and Sariful Razz won the award in Best Film Actor category.

== Cast ==
- Mosharraf Karim as Rashid Uddin
- Chanchal Chowdhury as Mr. Abul Khayer Khan "A. K. K.", Education Minister
- Sariful Razz as Dr. Ashhab
- Sabila Nur as Chitra
- Azmeri Haque Badhon as Shurma, Khan's wife
- Shamol Mawla as Aziz
- Zakia Bari Mamo as Afia, Aziz's wife
- Shamima Nazneen as Sajeda Begum, Ashhab's mother
- Intekhab Dinar as Chitra's paternal uncle
- A. K. Azad Shetu as Sudheer Chandra Das
- Tridha Paul Maan as Mitu, Aziz and Afia's daughter
- Monirul Islam Rubel
- Shangkha Zaman
- Labonno Chowdhury as Ruby
- Sifat Rahman as Shakil
- Tamim Kareem as Jafar
- Arefin Zilani as Faisal, Jamuna's husband
- Sabrin Azad as Jamuna
- Ahmed Hasan Sunny as Rocky
- Nuhash Humayun as Dead Body, the Narrator and Son of Rashid Uddin

Special appearances

- Masha Islam as Lily, Chitra's friend
- Ejajul Islam as Doctor
- Faruque Ahamed

== Production ==
The film is Tanim Noor's follow-up to his successful 2025 film Utshob. It is produced by Mahendra Soni, Shrikant Mohta, Vishnu Mohta, and Soumya Mukherjee. The screenplay is an adaptation of Humayun Ahmed's novel Kichhukkhon, overseen by Tanim Noor.

=== Development ===
Tanim Noor first hinted at the project on 8 September 2025, while accepting the Cinematic Excellence Award at the Blender's Choice–The Daily Star OTT & Digital Content Awards 2024, announcing it as based on a story by Humayun Ahmed. The title and adaptation details were officially announced on 14 October 2025. Nuhash Humayun, son of Humayun Ahmed, expressed excitement on social media, stating, "Best wishes to Tanim on his next film! 'Utshob' felt like a wonderful throwback to stories of old. Excited for his new adaptation of my father's work."

=== Filming ===
Principal photography is set to commence in December 2025. A custom train set will be constructed for key scenes, with filming planned across various locations in Dhaka, other parts of Bangladesh, and possibly abroad to capture diverse backdrops.

== Marketing ==
A 52-second announcement teaser was released on 14 October 2025, featuring a running train with the song "Chai-tei Paro" by Aurthohin as background music, poetic Bengali narration, and the tagline "Don't miss the train!" It ends with the film title and "Coming Soon". The teaser was shared on social media platforms, including by hoichoi Bangladesh.

== Soundtrack ==
The first song from the film, "Chaitei Paro", was released on YouTube on 6 March 2026, which is originally a song by the music band Aurthohin. In 20 March 2026, the second song of the film "Ural Debo Akashe" released, which is originally a song by Ayub Bachchu and re-sung by Ahmed Hasan Sunny. The composer and lyricist of the song is Abdullah Al Masud and Ayub Bachchu respectively. The film also used the song "Majhe Majhe Tabo Dekha Pai" by Shayan Chowdhury Arnob.

No.	Title	Lyrics	Music	Singer(s)	Length
1.	"Chaitei Paro"	Topu, Sumon		Aurthohin	02:30
2.	"Ural Debo Akashe"	Ayub Bachchu	Abdullah Al Masud	Ahmed Hasan Sunny	01:58

== Release ==
The film released in Eid-ul-Fitr conflicting with Prince: Once Upon a Time in Dhaka, Rakkhosh, Domm and Pressure Cooker. (Note: Attributed by multiple sources:) It released in Canada, United Kingdom and United States of America on 3 April 2026.

=== Screening and controversy ===
The Brahmanbaria Film Society, formed by undergraduate students from various higher education institutions, had organised a screening of the film Banalata Express at Annada Government High School premises on 30 May 2026 to mark Eid-ul-Azha. However, the screening was cancelled following a deadlock created by objections from Islamist groups. Brahmanbaria-2 lawmaker Rumeen Farhana announced a human chain and protest programme on 1 June against the suspension of the screening. Additionally, ten cultural organisations in Brahmanbaria strongly condemned the cancellation, describing it as a sign of growing intolerance toward cultural activities and freedom of expression. Supporters of the ban gave rape threats to Rumeen Farhana online.

== Awards ==
Year	Awards	Category	Winner	Results	Ref
2026	BIFA Awards	Best Film	—N/a	Won	
2026	BIFA Awards	Best Film Actor	Sariful Razz	Won	
2026	BIFA Awards	Best Film Actress	Sabila Nur	Won	
