= Naumi Hospitality =

Coordinates: 1.3004°N 103.8489°E

- Industry: Hotel
- Founded: 2007
- Founder: Surya Jhunjhnuwala
- Headquarters: Singapore
- Area served: Global
- Parent: Hind Development
- Website: naumihotels.com//

Naumi Hospitality is a hotel owner, operator and property chain, headquartered in Singapore. The group is a subsidiary of Hind Development and was founded by Surya Jhunjhnuwala. The hotel group owns a number of hotels in Singapore, Australia and New Zealand.

Their most notable hotels are located in Singapore, which have both being recognized as two of the best boutique hotels in the country by CNN and also Trip Advisor.

== History ==
Naumi Hospitality owns and operates a number of hotels and residencies in Singapore and New Zealand. The company was first founded in 2007, operating as a subsidiary of Hind Development Pte Ltd. Its first major property in Singapore is the 5-star hotel Naumi Hotel, located in the heart of Singapore. The hotel is recognized as a boutique hotel and has won a number of regional awards.

Shortly after opening, the boutique hotel featured on CNN due to the fact it was the only hotel in Singapore to have a women's only floor. In 2012, the first hotel in the Naumi Hospitality group underwent a multimillion-dollar revamp and reopened in October 2013.

The hotel group announced in late 2014 that they would be opening a new boutique hotel in Auckland, New Zealand. Named as Naumi Hotel Auckland Airport, the hotel has recently won 2018 Interior Awards under the Hospitality category for its colorful and bold interior design. The hotel is located on the same site as the previous Hotel Grand Chancellor. Within the same period, Naumi also announced they would be opening a new hotel in Sydney, Australia. Their hotel chain was also recognized by Forbes in late 2014.

During the same period, the group also launched their second Singapore-based hotel, Naumi Liora. The hotel was again based on a boutique style and design, with the hotel being converted from a heritage townhouse in Singapore. In 2017, the group sold Naumi Liora to 8M Real Estate.
