= Shyamol Mawla =

Bangladeshi actor

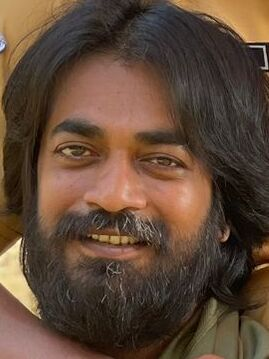
- Mawla in 2024
- Born: Golam Maola; November 8, 1983 (age 42); Shahbag, Dhaka
- Citizenship: Bangladeshi
- Occupation: Actor
- Years active: 2006-present

Golam Maola Shamol (born 8 November 1983) popularly known as Shamol Maola, is a Bangladeshi actor who works on stage, television and film. He started his career as a stage actor but currently works in television and Bangladeshi Bengali films. He made his acting debut through Sumon Anowar's Rod Brishtir Shohore (2006). Apart from that, his notable works include Mudrar Epith Opith, Astha, Cinemawala, Babui Pakhir Basa, Baranday Roddur. He later returned with a web series called Cash by director Syed Ahmed Shawki.

== Early life ==
Shyamol Maola's full name is Golam Maola Shyamol. He was born on 8 November 1983 in Shahbag of the capital Dhaka. But currently he is living in Uttara. He is a student of Eskaton Garden High School. Later he completed his higher secondary from Siddheshwari Degree College.

== Career ==
Shyamol Maola started acting in stage plays, his first drama being Rod Brishtir Shohore. Later, he worked in web series. In April 2018, Shyamol Maola made his OTT debut with a thriller drama called Cash directed by Syed Ahmed Shawki.

=== Film ===
Maola debut in the silver screen with Sincerely Yours, Dhaka (2019). The film was directed by 11 directors, including Nuhash Humayun, Tanim Noor, Robiul Alam Robi and Syed Ahmed Shawki. He made his lead role debut by Tauquir Ahmed's Sphulingo (2021). He also starred in Mainkar Chipay (2020), where he collaborated with Sariful Razz, and Afran Nisho.

After some successful films, he starred various films. His films are Here Jabar Golpo (2021), Sahosika 2 (2023), Deadbody (2024) and Agontuk (2024), and Bonolota Express (released in March 2026).

== Personal life ==
Shyamol married his second wife Maha Shikder on October 10, 2020. Shyamol Maola's first wife's name was Nandita. They divorced after three years. Shyamol has a son named Shreyan in that family.

== Filmography ==
=== Film ===
Key
†	Denotes films that have not yet been released

Year	Film	Role	Notes	Ref.
2019	Sincerely Yours, Dhaka	Magfirat	Debut film	
2020	Mainkar Chipay	Shafiq		
2021	Sphulingo	Partho	Debut in lead role	
2021	Here Jabar Golpo			
2023	Sahosika 2	Anis		
2024	Deadbody			
2024	Agontuk	Topu		
2026	Bonolota Express	Aziz		
2026	Chirkut	Tomal		
TBA	Nadaan †	TBA		
TBA	Suraiya †	Mansur	In post-production	

=== Web films ===
Year	Film	Role	OTT platform	Notes
2021	Koshtonir	Raihan Chowdhury	Hoichoi	Debut web film
2022	Café Desire	Abir Ahmed	Chorki	
2023	Antonagar		Chorki	

=== Web series ===
Year	Series	Role	OTT platform	Notes
2019	Money Honey	Shahriar	Hoichoi	Debut web series
2020	Sadarghater Tiger	Tiger	Binge	
2021	Contact	Baig	ZEE5	
2021	Mohanagar	Afnan Chowhury	Hoichoi	
2022	E Emon Porichoy	Rudro	ZEE5	
2022	Nikhoj	Saif Ahmed	Chorki	
2023	The Silence	Oyon	Binge	
2023	Ami Ki Tumi?		IScreen	
2023	Virus	Afzal	Chorki	
2024	Ararat	Rifat	Binge	
2024	Tiger	Tuger	Binge	
2025	Fekra	Ashfaq Ahmed	Bongo	
2025	Kanagoli	Mahfuz	Bongo	

=== TV series ===
Year	Series	Role	Platform	Notes
2011	Bishaash	Adnan	BTV, BTV World, Zee Café	Debut TV series; guest appearance

=== TV drama ===
Year	Drama	Channel	Running time	Co-artist	Notes
2006	Rod Brishtir Shohore	NTV	2006		Debut TV drama
2011	Noor Jahaan	Channel I	2010-11	Kamrul Hassan, Lutfur Rahman George	
2012	Mudrar Epith Opith	Channel 9	2012		Telefilm
2014	Astha	RTV	2014		
2015	Baranday Roddur	Maasranga TV, NTV	2015		
2016	Oborodh	Maasranga TV	2016	Orchita Sporshia	Special drama for International Mother Language Day
2016	Babui Pakhir Basa	ATN Bangla	2016-17	Shahiduzzaman Selim, Monira Mithu	
2016	Life and Fiona	NTV	2016	Afran Nisho, Sharlin Farzana, Airin	
2022	Life and Fiona	RTV	2022	Sabila Nur	
2023	Celluloid	RTV	2023	Zakia Bari Mamo	
2024	Shiuli Mala	Deepto TV	2024–present	Keya Payel, Mehazabien Chowdhury (apppeared as guest)	
2025	Makorsa	Deepto TV	2025	Sabila Nur	Eid drama
2025	Mayador	Channel I	2025	Tanjin Tisha	Eid drama
2025	Chalaki	Channel I	2025	Chanchal Chowhury, A. K. M. Hasan	Eid drama
2025	Poribarer Sera Golpo		2025	Tanjin Tisha, Nadia Ahmed	

=== Special dramas ===
- Happy Family (2024) - Tania Brishty
- Neel Kabyo (2024) - Niloy Alamgir, Moushumi Hamid
- Bisorjon - Aparna Ghosh
- Bukpockete Jibon - Mehazabien Chowdhury
- Ochena Megher Sondhane - Rafiath Rashid Mithila
- Holud Ronger Kham - Sarika Sabrin
- Opekkha/Sanad - Nusrat Imrose Tisha
- Ekdin Valo Thaki - Urmila Srabonti Kar
