= Stacyville, Maine =

Town in Maine, United States

- Town
- Location within Maine Location within the United States
- Coordinates: 45°53′20″N 68°29′30″W
- Country: United States
- State: Maine
- County: Penobscot

Area
  - Total: 39.54 sq mi (102.41 km^{2})
  - Land: 39.53 sq mi (102.38 km^{2})
  - Water: 0.012 sq mi (0.03 km^{2})
- Elevation: 600 ft (180 m)

Population (2020)
  - Total: 380
  - Density: 9.6/sq mi (3.7/km^{2})
- Time zone: UTC-5 (Eastern (EST))
  - Summer (DST): UTC-4 (EDT)
- ZIP Codes: 04777 (Stacyville); 04765 (Patten)
- Area code: 207
- FIPS code: 23-73600
- GNIS feature ID: 582743

Stacyville is a town in Penobscot County, Maine, United States, in the foothills of Mount Katahdin. The population was 380 at the 2020 census.

It achieved national prominence in 1939 when 12-year-old Donn Fendler was lost on Katahdin for nine days, before being found in Stacyville on July 25, 1939.

== Geography ==
According to the United States Census Bureau, the town has a total area of 39.54 square miles (102.41 km^{2}), of which 39.53 square miles (102.38 km^{2}) is land and 0.01 square miles (0.03 km^{2}) is water.

== Demographics ==
Historical population
Census	Pop.	Note	%±
1870	138		—
1880	184		33.3%
1890	250		35.9%
1900	347		38.8%
1910	577		66.3%
1920	583		1.0%
1930	600		2.9%
1940	717		19.5%
1950	679		−5.3%
1960	673		−0.9%
1970	547		−18.7%
1980	554		1.3%
1990	480		−13.4%
2000	405		−15.6%
2010	396		−2.2%
2020	380		−4.0%
U.S. Decennial Census

=== 2010 census ===
As of the census of 2010, there were 396 people, 162 households, and 107 families living in the town. The population density was 10.0 inhabitants per square mile (3.9/km^{2}). There were 224 housing units at an average density of 5.7 per square mile (2.2/km^{2}). The racial makeup of the town was 96.5% White, 0.3% African American, 0.8% Native American, 0.3% Asian, 0.3% from other races, and 2.0% from two or more races. Hispanic or Latino of any race were 0.8% of the population.

There were 162 households, of which 31.5% had children under the age of 18 living with them, 48.1% were married couples living together, 11.1% had a female householder with no husband present, 6.8% had a male householder with no wife present, and 34.0% were non-families. 27.2% of all households were made up of individuals, and 9.2% had someone living alone who was 65 years of age or older. The average household size was 2.44 and the average family size was 2.96.

The median age in the town was 42 years. 24.2% of residents were under the age of 18; 7.8% were between the ages of 18 and 24; 22.2% were from 25 to 44; 30.8% were from 45 to 64; and 15.2% were 65 years of age or older. The gender makeup of the town was 54.8% male and 45.2% female.

=== 2000 census ===
As of the census of 2000, there were 405 people, 162 households, and 115 families living in the town. The population density was 10.1 people per square mile (3.9/km^{2}). There were 226 housing units at an average density of 5.7 per square mile (2.2/km^{2}). The racial makeup of the town was 94.32% White, 1.73% Native American, 0.25% Asian, 0.99% from other races, and 2.72% from two or more races. Hispanic or Latino of any race were 1.73% of the population.

There were 162 households, out of which 31.5% had children under the age of 18 living with them, 62.3% were married couples living together, 5.6% had a female householder with no husband present, and 28.4% were non-families. 22.2% of all households were made up of individuals, and 8.0% had someone living alone who was 65 years of age or older. The average household size was 2.50 and the average family size was 2.90.

In the town, the population was spread out, with 25.7% under the age of 18, 5.9% from 18 to 24, 27.4% from 25 to 44, 24.0% from 45 to 64, and 17.0% who were 65 years of age or older. The median age was 41 years. For every 100 females, there were 89.3 males. For every 100 females age 18 and over, there were 95.5 males.

The median income for a household in the town was $26,667, and the median income for a family was $30,982. Males had a median income of $30,972 versus $15,417 for females. The per capita income for the town was $11,951. About 12.8% of families and 17.7% of the population were below the poverty line, including 22.8% of those under age 18 and 9.6% of those age 65 or over.

== Education ==
The community is in Katahdin Schools Regional School Unit #89.

- Katahdin Elementary School and Katahdin Junior-Senior High School.
