= Challenger (actor) =

Bangladeshi actor

- চ্যালেঞ্জার
- Born: 1959
- Died: 12 October 2010 (aged 52); Dhaka, Bangladesh
- Resting place: Paikpara, Dhamrai, Manikganj, Bangladesh
- Other name: Sadek
- Occupation: Actor
- Relatives: Monira Mithu (sister)

Challenger (born ASM Tofazzal Hossain; 1959 – 12 October 2010) was a Bangladeshi television and film actor known for his work in many dramas and movies. He became popular for his performances in television dramas and later appeared in several feature films.

== Early and personal life ==
Challenger was born in 1959 in Dhaka, which was then part of East Pakistan (now in Bangladesh). His birth name was ASM Tofazzal Hossain and he was also known by the personal nickname Sadek. His younger sister Monira Mithu, is a well-known television actress in Bangladesh. Hossain was nicknamed "Challenger" by writer, director Humayun Ahmed, when he debuted his acting career in the television drama Hablonger Bazare.

== Works ==
=== Television dramas ===
- Hablong-er Bazare (2000)
- Onath Babur Bhoy (2009)
- Brikkho Manab
- Bhober Haat
- Shawkat Shaheber Gari Kena
- Jamunar Jol Dekhtey Kalo
- Gani Shaheber Shesh Kichhudin
- Lilaboti
- Juta Baba
- Salek Dofadar
- Warrant
- Khela
- Dholbatti
- Aj Jorir Biye
- Khuab Nagar
- Chor
- Rupali Ratri
- Pichas Maqbul
- Poddo
- Akti Aoulokkik Bhromon Kahini
- Jol Torongo
- Ai Borshay
- Jinda Kobor
- Aziz Shahed er Pap
- 24 Caret Man

==== Guest appearance ====
- Tara Tin Jon

=== Drama serials ===
- Chandra Karigor
- Kala Koitor
- Ure Jay Bok Pokkhi
- Aim in Life

=== Films ===
- Shyamol Chhaya (2004)
- Noy Number Bipod Sanket
- Daruchini Dwip (2007)
- Lal Shobuj
- Kaal Shokaley

== Personal life ==
Challenger was respected by colleagues and audiences for his natural acting style and professionalism. In 2009, he became ill during the filming of Onath Babur Bhoy and was later diagnosed with brain cancer. He was taken to Singapore for treatment but his health did not improve. He died on 12 October 2010 in Dhaka at the age of 51. Actress Monira Mithu is Challenger's younger sister.
