= Zarin Tasnim Naumi =

Zarin Tasnim Naomi জারিন তাসনিম নাওমি Naumi
- Born: Zarin Tasnim Naumi; July 2, 1996 (age 30); Mymensingh, Bangladesh
- Occupation: singer
- Instrument: harmonium
- Years active: 2012–present
- Label: CD Choice

Zarin Tasnim Naumi (born 2 July 1996) is a Bangladeshi singer. She participated in the Bangladesh Television reality show Notun Kuri as a child. She has garnered nearly fourteen national and international awards in music. Later, her breakthrough came with the reality show Channel I Khude Gaanraj. She has sung in many hit films including Hero: The Superstar (2014), Most Welcome 2 (2014), Krishnopokkho (2016), Valobasha Emoni Hoy (2017), and on albums including "Tumi", "Tumi Hina", and "Milon" with Imran Mahmudul.

== Early life ==
Naumi was born in Mymensingh, Bangladesh on 2 July 1996. She later moved to Dhaka. She completed her schooling and college at Cambrian College, Dhaka.

== Career ==
Naumi began singing at the age of four. She learned music from Anil Kumar Dhar. She sang the song "Meghla Akash" on Amir Newaz's album. She gained nationwide popularity when she participated in the Channel i Khude Gaanraj contest. She debuted with her first album Naumi in 2012. Later, she sang the theme song of ABC Radio and Dhaka FM. She sang some jingles and published several successful music videos. Naumi has sung in several films as well.

== Discography ==
Year	Film/Album	Song	Co-singer
-	-	"Meghla Akash"	Amir Newaz
2014	Tumi	"Ki Kore Tomay Bojhai"	Imran Mahmudul
2014	Tumi Hina	"Anmona" "Shopno Majhe"	Imran Mahmudul
2014	Milon	"Ektu Ektu"	Milon
2014	Most Welcome 2	"Hawa Hoye Chhuye"	Bappa Mazumder
2014	Hero: The Superstar	"Jekhane Jabe Amake Pabe"	Arfin Rumey
2016	Krishnopokkho	"Cholona Brishtite Bhiji"	S. I. Tutul
2017	Valobasha Emoni Hoy	"Valobasha Emoni Hoy"	S. I. Tutul
