= Sabila Nur =

Bangladeshi actress and model

- সাবিলা নূর
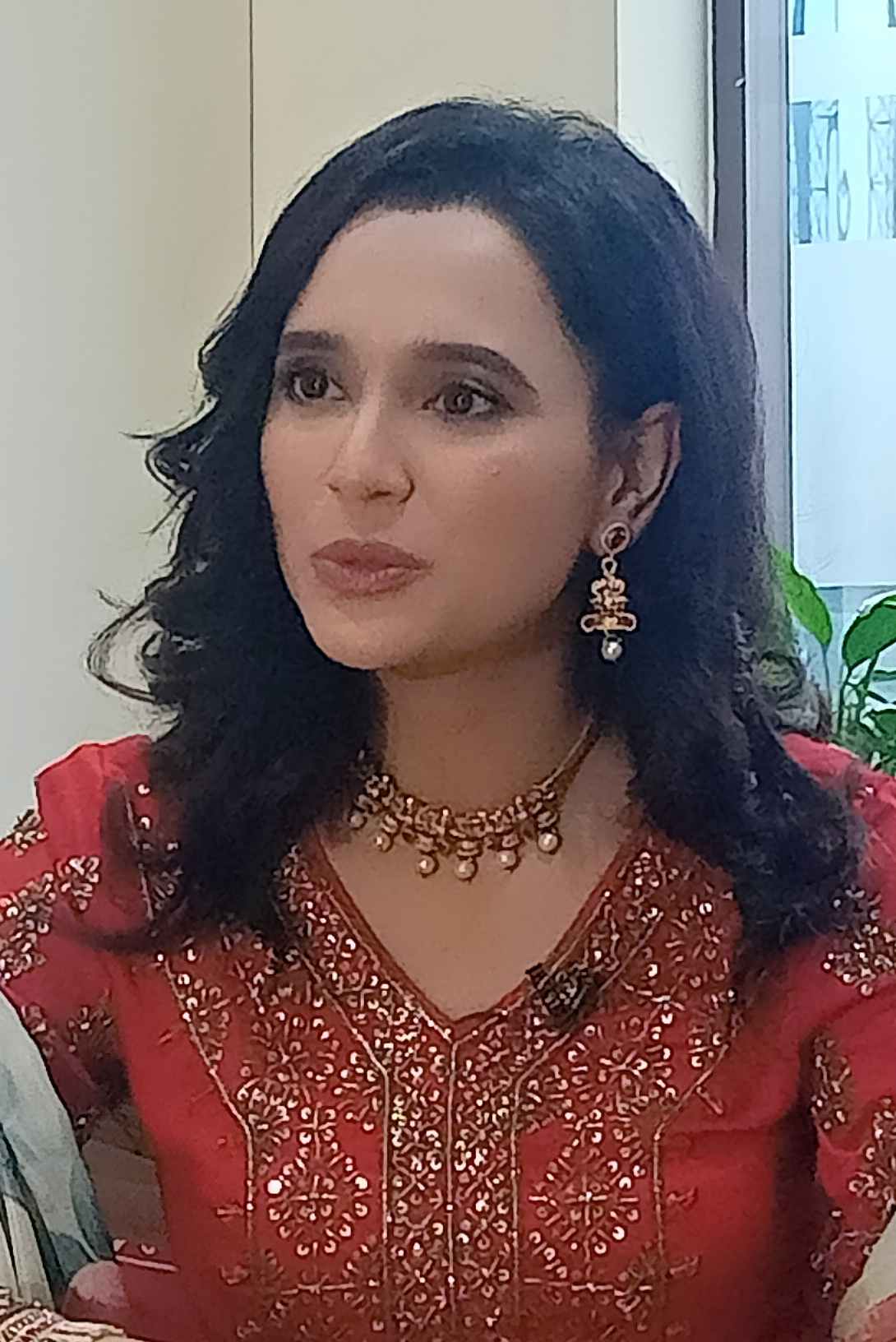
- Sabila in 2025
- Born: 27 May 1995 (age 31); Chittagong, Bangladesh
- Education: American International University-Bangladesh
- Occupations: Actress, model, dancer
- Years active: 2010–present
- Spouse: Nehal Taher (m. 2019)

Sabila Nur (born 27 May 1995) is a Bangladeshi actress. She got her breakthrough performing as "The Imaginary Girl" in a romantic comedy telefilm Monkey Bizness (2015). She performs in Bengali TV dramas and many TVC.

== Early life and education ==
She learned dancing from Bulbul Lalitakala Academy. She earned her bachelor of arts degree from the American International University-Bangladesh in 2023.

== Career ==
Nur started her career by modeling for the country's largest telecom company, Grameenphone. She is the host of Gazi TV's competition on teen bands, GTV Fanta Band. She is also the host of Lux Style fine on Banglavision. She is the brand ambassador of Glow & Lovely.

Nur made her telefilm debut with U-Turn in 2014.

== Works ==
Key
†	Denotes films that have not yet been released

Year	Films	Roles	Notes	Ref
2023	Mujib: The Making of a Nation	Sheikh Rehana	Debut film	
2025	Taandob	Nishat		
2026	Bonolota Express	Chitra	Based on Humayun Ahmed's novel Kichukkhon	
2026	Rockstar	Mira		
2026	Faisha Gesi	Samira	Released on Chorki	
2027	Kanabhula Paradox †	TBA	Filming	

== Television ==
Year	Drama	Role	Director	Notes	Ref
2014	U Turn			Television debut	
2015	Monkey Business		Rahat Rahman		
2015	Kolponar Ghor		---		
2016	Chemistry		---		
2016	Teen Teen		Mabrur Rashid Bannah		
2016	Musti Unlimited		---		
2016	Shoto Danar Projapoti		---		
2016	Rod Brishty Othoba Onnokichu		---		
2016	Chup		---		
2016	Sonaton Kabbya		---		
2016	Bullet Proof Marriage		---		
2016	Cross Connection		---		
2016	Misfire		---		
2016	Jonakir Alo		---		
2016	Khondokar Saheb		---		
2016	Valobashar Vut o Vobissot		---		
2016	Three Friends		---		
2016	Hell Mate		---		
2016	MMS		---		
2016	Jonakir Alo		---		
2016	Together		---		
2016	Premer Oli Golpo		---		
2016	Khoron		---		
2016	Protishodh		---		
2016	Oporajita Tumi		---		
2016	Jol Kolongko		---		
2016	Sairen		---		
2016	Love and Company		---		
2016	Somapti		---		
2016	Pasan is Back		---		
2016	Ja Kichu Ghote		---		
2016	Shoytani Hashi		---		
2017	Basic Ali	Ria			
2017	Megh Enechi Veja		Rubayet Mahmud		
2017	Happy Ending		Jakaria Soukin		
2017	Polayon Bidya		Iftikhar Ahmed		
2017	Love & Co.		Masud Sezan		
2017	Jemon Khushi Temon Sajo		Moniruzzaman Ripon		
2018	Kadbona		Mabrur Rashid Bannah		
2018	O Jeno Amar Hoy		Mabrur Rashid Bannah		
2020	Xchange		Rubel Hasan		
2021	Pasher Bashar Cheleta		Shihab Shaheen		
2021	Runu Vai		Shihab Shaheen		
2021	Agdum Bagdum		Rubel Hasan		
2021	Panta Bhate Ghee				
2021	Biye Birombona		Shihab Shaheen		
2022	Runu Vai 2		Shihab Shaheen		
2022	Oghoton		Shihab Shaheen		
2022	Abaro Oghoton		Shahiab Shaheen		
2022	Kagojer Biye				
2022	Digbaji				
2022	XChange Returns		Rubel Hasan		
2022	Bipod Songket				
2023	Runu Vai 3		Shihab Shaheen		
2024	Kichu Golper Sesh Nai				

=== Short films ===
- Chesra Premik
- Voice of Love (2017)
- Polayon Biddya (2017)
- The Knock (2020)
- Bondings (2021)
- 700 Taka (2021)
- Short Cut Series (Emon Jodi Hoto) (2021)
- Ke Kokhon Kivabe (Hot Patties) (2021)

=== Documentary ===
Year	Drama	Co-artist	Role	Aired Channel	Director	Notes
2017	Documentary of European University	Hasan Masood, Abdul Aziz, Anisur Rahman Milon	Herself	Ekhushey TV	Borhan Khan	She talks to University's cultural students of European University of Bangladesh

== Awards and nominations ==
Year	Award	Category	Drama	Result	Source
2014	Meril Prothom Alo Awards	Best Newcomer Actress	U-Turn	Nominated	
2026	BIFA Awards	Best Film Actress (popular)	Bonolota Express	Won	

== Personal life ==
Nur is married to Nehal Sunando Taher since October 2019.
