= Anam Biswas =

Bangladeshi director, composer and writer

- অনম বিশ্বাস
- Occupations: Director, screenwriter, composer, writer
- Years active: 2004–present
- Notable work: Aynabaji, Debi
- Spouse: Kaenat Ahmed
- Awards: National Film Award (1st time)

Anam Biswas is a Bangladeshi director, screenwriter, composer and writer. He is the director and screenwriter of Debi, released in 2018. In 2016, he won Bangladesh National Film Award for Best Screenplay for the film Aynabaji. He is also known to be an actor on the bangla drama '69' as the character Rafi.

== Personal life ==
Biswas is married to writer Kaenat Ahmed.

== Selected films ==
=== As a composer ===
- Dubshatar (2010)

=== As a director ===
- Debi - 2018
- WTFry - What the Fry (web film, released in Zee5) - 2021
- Dui Diner Duniya (web film, released in Chorki) - 2022
- Football 71† - (2023)
- Rongila Kitab (web series) - (2023)

=== As a screenwriter ===
- Aynabaji - 2016
- Debi - 2018

== Awards and nominations ==
National Film Awards

Year	Award	Category	Film	Result
2016	National Film Award	Best Screenplay	Aynabaji	Won
