= Faruque Ahamed =

Bangladeshi actor

Faruque Ahmed
- Born: 25 March 1960 (age 66); Manikganj, Bangladesh
- Occupation: Actor
- Years active: 1983–present
- Known for: Acting in drama

Faruque Ahmed is a playwright and actor in Bangladesh. He started his acting career by acting on stage while studying at the department of Geography and Environment of Jahangirnagar University. He was introduced across the country by playing a negative role called Rasik Lal in Baro rokom manus broadcast on Bangladesh Television. He was a regular face of popular playwright and writer Humayun Ahmed's drama.

== Early and personal life ==
Faruque Ahamed was born in Manikganj District of Dhaka division. He studied at the department of Geography and Environment at Jahangirnagar University. After passing out of the university, Faruque was involved in various NGOs including BRAC for a while. He is the father of a daughter.

== Career ==
Faruque Ahamed joined Dhaka theatre in 1983. There he worked with actors like Humayun Faridi, Afzal Hossain, Suborna Mustafa, Shimul Yousuf, Raisul Islam Asad, Ahmed Rubel and Litu Anam. He was associated with theatre for about 25 years. While in theatre, he was significantly discussed with his performances in plays like Kirtankhola, pracho, Keramat Mandal, Chakra and Yavati Kanya.

He was first significantly discussed Imdadul Haq Milan's TV drama Boro rokomer manus by playing Rasiklal. Shortly thereafter, he came to the notice of Humayun Ahmed and acted in the play Achin brikhho directed by him. After that, he became Sadin Khasru and Dr. Ejajul starred in Humayun Ahmed's popular series with Islam called Tara Tin Jon.

He also wrote the scripts of several plays including kal shaper donshon, uccho bonsho patra chai, digbaji, dui basinda and pani para. He directed the two dramas badragi badrul and how mau khaw.

He is mainly known as a theatre actor but has also acted in a few films.

== Works ==
=== Theatres ===
- Kirtankhola
- Pracha
- Keramat Mandal
- Cakra
- Yavati konnar mon

=== Television ===
- Boro Rokomer Manush
- Ochin Brikhho
- Humayun Ahmed
- Aaj Robibar
- Brikhho Manob
- Grihosukh Pvt. Ltd.
- Bonur Golpo
- Hablonger Bazarey
- 24 Caret Man
- Ghorer Khobor Porer Khobor
- Ami Aaj Bhejabo Chokh Somudro Joley!
- Ure Jai Bokpakkhi
- Tara Tinjon: Tea Master
- Juta Baba
- Mohan Choinik Chikitshok: Wang Pi
- Montri Mohodoyer Agomon Shubheccha Shagotom
- Yamuna'r Jol Dekhte Kalo
- Chor
- Homehappiness Pvt. Ltd.
- Jaitari
- The same case
- Ghost Luxury
- Silver Night
- Enayet Ali's Chhagol
- Hostage
- Behind the Scene
- FnF
- Graduate
- Jimmi
- Amra Jege Achi
- @18: All Time Dourer Upor
- Moneybag
- Faad O Bogar Golpo
- Sikander Box
- Behind the Trap
- Average Aslam
- Fatman
- Mahin Series
- Durer Bari Kacher Manush
- Chander Chada
- Behind The Puppy
- Syed Barir Bou
- Ekhane Keu Thakena
- Ekhane Keu Thakena 2
- Stories of traps and bobas
- Para
- Hitler wants to die
- Hoichoi Paribaar
- Shanti Molom 10 Taka
- Brazil vs Argentina Reloaded with Arosh Khan & Zaher Alvi

=== Films ===
- Nodir Naam Modhumoti (1996)
- Shyamol Chhaya (2004)
- Tok Jhaal Mishti (2005)
- Noy Number Bipod Sanket (2007)
- Ghetuputra Komola
- Taarkata (2014)
- Krishnopokkho (2016)
- Voyongkor Sundor (2017)
- Fagun Haway (2019)
- August 1975 (2021)
- Shuklopokkho (2022)
- Mukhosh (2022)
- Agamikal (2022)
- Esha Murder: Karmaphal (2025) as OC Sirajul
- Bonolota Express (2026)
- Kanamachi (Upcoming)

=== Web series ===
- Bhoyer Golpo – Murda Khat
- Sabrina (2022)
- Biye Jokhon Experiment (2025)

== Awards ==
Impressed by Faruque Ahamed's performance, Humayun Ahmed dedicated his book Lilua Batas.
