= Ferdous Ahmed filmography =

- Film: 164
- Television series: 1
- Hosting: 2

Ferdous Ahmed (born 7 June 1972) is a Bangladeshi film actor and producer. He acts in Bangladesh and Indian Bengali films. He won Bangladesh National Film Award for Best Actor 5 times for his roles in the films Hothat Brishti (1998), Gangajatra (2009), Kusum Kusum Prem (2011), Ek Cup Cha (2014) and Putro (2018).

== Filmography ==
Year	Film	Role	Notes
1997	Buker Bhitor Agun	Agun	Debut film
1998	Hothat Brishti	Ajith Chowdhury	Won: Bangladesh National Film Award for Best Actor, Won: Special Jury Anandalok Puraskar
1998	Modhu Purnima	Modhu	
1998	Prithibi Amare Chayna		
1999	Jibon Chabi		
1999	Miss Daina		
1999	Pordeshi Babu		
1999	Sontan Jokhon Shotru		
1999	Chupi Chupi		
1999	Jobabdihi		
2000	Amar Protigga		
2000	Amader Sansar		
2000	Ei Mon Chay Je...!		
2000	Har Jeet	Arun	
2001	Biplobi Janata		
2001	Mitti	Deva	Hindi Film
2001	Shuorani Duorani		
2001	Churiwala		
2001	Dada Thakur	Raja	
2001	Master Moshai		
2001	Ostad		
2001	Keno Bhalobashlam		
2002	Tak Jhal Mishti	Ajith	
2002	Saanjhbatir Rupkothara		
2002	Swapner Feriwala	Siddharth	
2002	Bhalobashar Juddho		
2002	Bostir Meye		
2002	Bou Hobo		
2002	Sontrasi Bondhu		
2002	Premer Jwala		
2002	Jonom Jonomer Sathi	Jibon	
2002	Phool Aar Pathor		
2002	Joto Prem Toto Jwala		
2002	Protihingsha		
2002	Prem Shakti	Mohan	
2003	Bou Shashurir Juddho	Sajeeb Chowdhury	
2003	Kokhono Megh Kokhono Brishti	Srabon	
2003	Miss Diana		
2003	Sobar Upore Prem		
2003	Karagar		
2003	Chandrokotha	Zahir	
2003	Praner Manush	Abhi	
2003	Tumi Boro Bhaggoboti		
2003	Kheya Ghater Majhi		
2003	Tumi Shudhu Amar	Raju	
2003	Brishti Bheja Akash		
2003	Ghor Jamai		
2004	Dost Amar		
2004	Joto Prem Toto Jwala		
2004	Phooler Moto Bou		
2004	Bachelor	Fahim	
2004	Akritagyo		
2004	Mon Jake Chay		
2004	Sagor Kinare		
2004	Khairun Sundori	Fazal	
2004	Dadu No. 1	Akash	
2005	Meher Nigar	Yusuf	
2005	Kal Shokale	Aju	
2005	Bolona Bhalobashi		
2005	Bou Keno Bondhok		
2005	Bhalobashar Juddho		
2005	Dui Noyoner Alo	Akash	
2005	Ghorer Lokkhi		
2005	Ek Buk Jwala		
2005	Khude Joddha		
2005	Jibon Shimante		
2005	Amar Swapno Tumi	Shahed	
2006	Ayna	Dolon	
2006	Praner Swami		
2006	Rakkhusi		
2006	Bindur Chhele		
2006	Dhrubotara		
2006	Rani Kuthir Baki Itihas	Rudra	
2006	Porom Priyo		
2006	Nondito Noroke	Khoka	Belal Ahmed
2006	Na Bolona	Sojol	
2007	Aha!		
2007	Jomila Sundori		
2007	Dukkhini Johura		
2007	Biyain Saab		
2007	Dojjal Shashuri		
2007	Ore Sampanwala		
2007	Banglar Bou		
2008	Rupantor	Arif	
2008	Mayer Swapno		
2008	Eri Naam Bhalobasha		
2008	Swaponopuron		
2008	Biyer Lagna	Akash	
2008	Baba Amar Baba		
2008	Amar Ache Jol	Sabbir	
2008	Aaynate	Rajat	
2008	Swami Niye Juddho		
2008	Chhoto Bon		
2008	Mayer Moto Bhabi		
2008	Swami Hara Sundori		special appearance
2008	Golapjan		
2008	Bodhu Boron		
2008	E Chokhe Shudhu Tumi		
2008	Sonar Moyna Pakhi		
2008	Tui Jodi Amar Hoiti Re	Shawon	
2009	Gangajatra		Winner: Bangladesh National Film Award for Best Actor
2009	Shubho Bibaho		
2009	Jol Rong		
2009	Tumi Ki Sei		
2009	Moyna Motir Songsar		
2009	Ke Ami		special appearance
2009	Opare Akash		
2010	Jaago - Dare To Dream	Shamim	
2010	Abujh Bou		
2010	Golapi Ekhon Bilatey	Mukta	
2010	Mohanogori		
2010	Morjada		
2011	Kusum Kusum Prem	Hashem	Winner: Bangladesh National Film Award for Best Actor
2011	Guerrilla	Hasan Ahmed	
2011	Fighter	A.C.P Subhash Bose	
2011	Rong Berong		
2011	Bhalo Meye Mondo Meye		
2011	Ke Apon Ke Por		
2012	Final Mission		
2012	Passport		
2012	Purnobrammah Sri Sri Harichand Thakur		
2012	Comeback		
2012	Palatak		
2012	Antardhan		
2012	Khokha babu	Shankar Das a.k.a. Bhaiji	
2012	Putro Jokhon Poyshawala		
2012	Jiddi Bou		
2012	Hothat Sedin	Sanjay	
2012	Khola Hawa		
2013	Encounter		
2013	Porichoi	Salim	
2013	Khancha	Ferdous Ahmed	
2013	Akorshon		
2013	Kichhu Asha Kichhu Bhalobasha		
2013	Phire Eso Abar		
2013	Shubho Bibaho	Rajib	
2013	Emonoto Prem Hoy		
2013	Juge Juge Tumi Amari		
2013	Samadhi	Sagar	
2014	Ek Cup Cha		Winner: Bangladesh National Film Award for Best Actor; Winner: Bachsas Award for Best Actor
2014	Brihonnola		
2014	Priya Tumi Sukhi Hou		
2014	Char Okkhorer Bhalobasha		
2015	Dui Beayar Kirti		
2015	Moner Ojante		
2015	Shovoner Shadhinota		
2015	Noy Chhoy		
2015	Swargo Theke Norok		
2015	Aaro Ekbar		
2015	Potadar Keerti		
2015	Krishnopokkho	Abrar	
2015	Anil Bagchir Ekdin		
2016	Mon Jane Na Moner Thikana		
2016	Badsha – The Don	Jayanta/ Johnny Bhai	Indo-Bangladesh joint production
2016	Bhalobashboi To		
2016	Kotodin Dekhini Tomay		
2016	Rong Keno Bishwo Rong		
2017	Yeti Obhijaan	Thomas Tribhuban Gupta	
2018	Kabir	Rajnath Bakshi	Special appearance
2018	Kaler Putul		
2018	Leader		
2018	Megh Kanya		
2018	Postmaster 71	Arif	
2018	Pobitro Bhalobasha		
2018	Putro		Winner: Bangladesh National Film Award for Best Actor
2021	Gontobbo		
2022	The Beauty Circus	Mirza Mohammad Bakhtiar	
2023	Mike		
2023	1971 Shei Shob Din		
2023	Sujon Majhi		
2024	Ahare Jibon		
TBA	Dam Para†		Filming
TBA	Maniker Lal Kankra†		
TBA	Jam†		Filming
TBA	Gangchil†		Based on Obaidul Quader novel and Filming
TBA	Waiting for Russell†		
TBA	Khoma Nei†		
TBA	Mir Jafar: Chapter 2†		
