= 36th Bangladesh National Film Awards =

National Film Awards, Bangladesh

- Awarded for: Excellence in cinematic achievements of bangladeshi cinema in 2011
- Awarded by: President of Bangladesh
- Presented by: Ministry of Information
- Presented on: 2013
- Site: Dhaka, Bangladesh
- Official website: moi.gov.bd

Highlights
- Best Feature Film: Guerilla
- Best Non-feature Film: Al-Badar and Lokonayak Kangal Harinath
- Best Actor: Ferdous Ahmed; Kusum Kusum Prem
- Best Actress: Joya Ahsan; Guerrilla
- Lifetime achievement: Nayok Raj Razzak
- Most awards: Guerrilla (10)

The 36th National Film Awards were presented by the Ministry of Information, Bangladesh, to felicitate the best of Bangladeshi cinema released in the year 2011. The awards in the ceremony were given by the president of Bangladesh. 24 artistes and others were given the National Film Awards 2011 in recognition of their outstanding contributions to the country's film industry. Guerrilla, the 2011 film on the Liberation War, won 10 awards – including best film, best director, and best actress.

== Awards ==
=== Merit awards ===
Name of Awards	Winner(s)	Film
Best Film	Esha Yusuf and Faridur Reza Sagor	Guerrilla
Best Director	Nasiruddin Yousuff	Guerrilla
Best Actor	Ferdous	Kusum Kusum Prem
Best Actress	Joya Ahsan	Guerrilla
Best Actor in a Supporting Role	Alamgir	Ke Apon Ke Por
Best Actress in a Supporting Role	Farida Akhter Bobita	Ke Apon Ke Por
Best Actor in a Negative Role	Shatabdi Wadud; Misha Sawdagor	Guerrilla; Boss Number One
Best Child Artist	Samonti	Khondagolpo-1971
Best Music Director	Habib Wahid	Projapoti
Best Music Composer	Emon Saha	Kusum Kusum Prem
Best Lyricist	Shafiq Tuhin	Projapoti
Best Male Playback Singer	Kumar Biswajit	Ma Amar Chokher Moni
Best Female Playback Singer	Nazmun Munir Nancy	Projapoti

=== Technical awards ===
Name of Awards	Winner(s)	Film
Best Story	Muhammad Zafar Iqbal	Amar Bondhu Rashed
Best Dialogue	Nasiruddin Yousuff and Ebaidur Rahman	Guerrilla
Best Screenplay	Nasiruddin Yousuff and Ebaidur Rahman	Guerrilla
Best Art Direction	Animesh Aich	Guerrilla
Best Editing	Samir Ahmed	Guerrilla
Best Cameraman	Lawrence Apu Rosario	Amar Bondhu Rashed
Best Cinematography	Rotan Pal	Amar Bondhu Rashed
Best Costume Design	Simul Yusuf	Guerrilla
Best Makeup	Mohammad Ali Babul	Guerrilla

=== Special awards ===
- Lifetime Achievement Award – Abdur Razzak
- Best Documentary Film – Al-Badar (Fokhrul Arefin) and Lokonayak Kangal Harinath (Directorate of Film and Publicity)

== Jury board ==
The government had constituted a 13-member jury board with an additional secretary of the Ministry of Information as president and the vice-chairman of the Bangladesh Film Censor Board (BFSB) as member secretary for awarding the National Film Awards 2011. The jury board recommended for the award after examining eligibility to get the award in different categories by 30 September 2012. The first meeting of the jury board was held at the BFSB boardroom in the capital, Dhaka, and jury board president M Hafizur Rahman presided over the meeting.

== See also ==
- Meril Prothom Alo Awards
- Ifad Film Club Award
- Babisas Award
