= 33rd Bachsas Awards =

Bangladeshi film awards ceremony in 2013

- Awarded for: outstanding performers of the silver screen, small screen, music, dance and theatre in 2011
- Awarded by: Bangladesh Cine-Journalists' Association
- Presented by: Bangladesh Cine-Journalists' Association
- Announced on: September 8, 2013
- Presented on: October 10, 2013
- Site: Indoor Stadium, Mirpur, Dhaka, Bangladesh

Highlights
- Best Film: Guerrilla
- Best Actor: Amin Khan (Goriber Mon Onek Boro)
- Best Actress: Joya Ahsan (Guerrilla)

The 33rd Bachsas Awards were given by the Bangladesh Cholochitra Sangbadik Samity (Bangladesh Cine-Journalists' Association) to outstanding performers of the silver screen, small screen, music, dance, and theatre in 2011. The awards were introduced in 1972 to encourage the fledgling film industry of the country.

== List of winners ==
=== Film ===
Name of Awards	Winner(s)	Film
Best Film	Shimul Yusuff	Guerrilla
Best Director	Nasiruddin Yousuff	Guerrilla
Best Actor	Amin Khan	Goriber Mon Onek Boro
Best Actress	Joya Ahsan	Guerrilla
Best Supporting Actor	Alamgir	Matir Thikana
Best Supporting Actress	Shampa Reza	Guerrilla
Best Music Director	Shimul Yusuff	Guerrilla
Best Lyrics	Selim Al Din	Guerrilla (Niros o Dogdho Somoy)
Best Male Playback Singer	James	(Chotordolay Ghumiye Ami)
Best Female Playback Singer	Shimul Yusuff	Guerrilla (Joy Sottyer Joy)
Best Story	Syed Shamsul Haq	Guerrilla
Best Dialogue	Nasiruddin Yousuff and Ebadul Hoq	Guerrilla
Best Cinematography	Nasiruddin Yousuff and Ebadul Hoq	Guerrilla
Best Screenplay	Lawrence Apu Rosario	Amar Bondhu Rashed
Best Art Direction	Animesh Aich	Guerrilla
Best Editing	Samir Ahmed	Guerrilla
Best Sound Recording	Said Hasan Tipu	Guerrilla
Special Award	Mosharraf Karim; Ryan Ibtesham Chowdhury	Projapoti; Amar Bondhu Rashed
