= List of Bangladeshi films of 1999 =

This is an incomplete list of Bangladeshi films released in 1999.

== Releases ==
Release date	Title	Director	Cast	Genre	Notes	Ref
31 March	Srabon Megher Din	Humayun Ahmed	Zahid Hasan, Meher Afroz Shaon, Mukti, Mahfuz Ahmed, Golam Mostafa	Drama		
28 May	Ananta Bhalobasha	Sohanur Rahman Sohan	Shakib Khan, Erin Zaman, Abul Hayat, Dolly Zahur, Rajib, Nasir Khan	Action, romance	On-screen debut of Shakib Khan and Erin Zaman	
25 June	Ammajan	Kazi Hayat	Shabnam, Manna, Moushumi, Amin Khan, Dipjol	Crime, drama		
29 October	Dujon Dujonar	Abu Sayeed Khan	Shakib Khan, Sadika Parvin Popy, Wasimul Bari Rajib, Sadek Bachchu, Mizu Ahmed	Romance, drama		
12 November	Ajker Dapot	A.J Rana	Shakib Khan, Purnima, Alexander Bo, Eka, Humayun Faridi, Dipjol	Action, crime		
	Bagher Thaba	Sohel Rana	Masum Parvez Rubel, Moushumi, Champa, Ali Raj, Humayun Faridi	Action, romance		
	Biyer Phul	Matin Rahman	Riaz, Shabnur, Shakil Khan, Kabori Sarwar, Ahmed Sharif	Romance		
	Dhor	Kazi Hayat	Manna, Eka, Bobita, Dipjol, Mizu Ahmed	Action		
	Dushmon Dunia	Shafiqul Islam	Manna, Moushumi, Humayun Faridi, Amit Hasan, Shahnaz, Anwara, Dildar, Nasir Khan	Action		
	Ke Amar Baba	Montazur Rahman Akbar	Manna, Popy, Rajib, Humayun Faridi	Action, romance		
	Raagi	Gazi Mazharul Anwar	Masum Parvez Rubel, Popy, Bobita, Razzak, ATM Shamsuzzaman	Action, romance		
	Tomar Jonno Pagol	Shilpi Chakraborti	Riaz, Shabnur, Amit Hasan, ATM Shamsuzzaman, Dildar	Romance		

== Notable debuts ==
- Shakib Khan – Ananta Bhalobasha
- Erin Zaman – Ananta Bhalobasha
- Yasmin Bilkis Sathi – Pordeshi Babu
- Priyanka Trivedi – Hothat Brishti (Bangladeshi debut)

== See also ==
- List of Bangladeshi films of 1998
- 1999 in Bangladesh
- List of Bangladeshi films of 2000
