= Ebadur Rahman =

Bengali writer

- এবাদুর রহমান
- Occupations: Filmmaker, novelist
- Notable work: Meherjaan

Ebadur Rahman is a Bengali novelist and award-winning filmmaker.

== Biography ==
Ebadur Rahman curated Bangladeshi artists including Ronni Ahmmed at the 14th and 15th edition of the Open International Exhibition of Sculpture and Installations in Venice, Lido and in the San Servolo Island.

Ebadur Rahman's directorial debut Atrocity Exhibition premiered in the Short Film Corner of the Festival de Cannes, 2013.

== Works ==
=== Alpha ===
Ebadur Rahman co-wrote the screenplay for the feature-length film Alpha, which Bangladesh has selected as its submission for the international feature film category at the 2020 Oscars.

=== Atrocity Exhibition ===
Ebadur Rahman's directorial debut Atrocity Exhibition premiered in the Short Film Corner of the Festival de Cannes, 2013.

=== Guerilla ===
The film Guerrilla received ten Jatio Chalachitra Purushkar or National Awards, two of which were for the screenplay and dialog written by Ebadur Rahman and his co-writer Nasiruddin Yusuf. Because of a disagreement with the director Ebadur Rahman left Guerrilla during the production.

=== Meherjaan ===
Ebadur Rahman wrote the initial screenplay for the feature-length film, Meherjaan, but he left the project because of creative differences.
