= Ananta Bhalobasha =

Bangladeshi Romantic action film

- Poster
- Directed by: Sohanur Rahman Sohan
- Screenplay by: Sohanur Rahman Sohan: dialogue; Henry Amin
- Story by: Henry Amin & Abu Saeed Khan
- Starring: Shakib Khan; Erin Zaman; Abul Hayat; Wasimul Bari Rajib; Dolly Johur; Nasir Khan; Misha Sawdagor
- Cinematography: Shahidullah Dulal
- Edited by: Jinnat Hossain
- Music by: Ahmed Imtiaz Bulbul; Alam Khan
- Production company: SP Production
- Distributed by: SP Production
- Release date: 28 May 1999
- Running time: 155 minutes
- Country: Bangladesh
- Language: Bengali

Ananta Bhalobasha (Note: Bengali: অনন্ত ভালবাসা; Bengali pronunciation: [ænˈæntə bˌæləbˈæʃə]; transl. Eternal Love) is a 1999 Bangladeshi romantic action film. The film was directed by Sohanur Rahman Sohan, who also wrote the screenplay, and produced by Kuddusur Rahman under the banner of SP Production. The story and dialogues of the film were written by Abu Saeed Khan and Henry Amin, respectively. The film stars Shakib Khan and Erin Zaman in the lead roles. It also features Abul Hayat, Wasimul Bari Rajib, Dolly Johur, and Misha Sawdagor in various important roles. The film marked the on-screen debut of Shakib Khan and Erin Zaman.

== Cast ==
Shakib (Khan) was brought to my attention by choreographer Aziz Reza, who first showed me his still photographs and strongly recommended him. At his insistence, I asked to meet the boy in person, and Aziz brought him to our office. We liked him as soon as we saw him. Shakib had the potential to become a leading man, and it was because I saw that potential in him that I cast him in the film. He may have been recommended, and I may have given him the opportunity, but the fact is that he was deserving.

— Director Sohanur Rahman Sohan about introducing Shakib Khan in the film.
- Shakib Khan as Moshal
- Erin Zaman as Jyoti
- Abul Hayat as Afzal Chowdhury
- Dolly Johur as Nazma Chowdhury, Wife of Afzal Chowdhury
- Wasimul Bari Rajib as Ashraf Chowdhury
- Rina Khan as Rahela Chowdhury, Wife of Ashraf Chowdhury
- Nasir Khan as Akram Chowdhury
- Anwar Hossain as Rahim Miah
- Amol Bose as Solicitor
- Misha Sawdagor as Rana
- Afzal Sharif as Boltu

== Casting ==
The film protagonist Shakib Khan's on-camera debut 1998 romantic drama film Sobaito Shuki Hote Chay directed by Aftab Khan Tulu, which was delayed being release. Although the film later released in the following year. At that time, director Sohanur Rahman Sohan was looking for a new hero due to a dispute with actor Shakil Khan. In two deferent interviews with Kaler Kantho and Chiti one of Khan's mentor Aziz Reza, who is the renowned choreographer, said that, he very much requested Sohanur Rahman Sohan to give a chance Shakib Khan in his film. Sohan agreed to his request and asked to bring Khan to their office. Sohan then gave him a chance as a lead actor for the film. Shakib Khan was paid-up only ৳5,000 for the film.

Shakib Khan said about acting in the film,

"When I started my film career, I was immature, but visionary. I didn't know where I was going or what I was going to do. I didn't know where I was going or what I was going to do. All I knew was that I had to work hard. Never give up. Today, when I look back, I'm grateful for all the people and experiences."

— Khan about acting in Ananta Bhalobasha.

== Soundtrack ==
Ananta Bhalobasha

Soundtrack album by Ahmed Imtiaz Bulbul, Alam Khan
- Released: 1 January 1999
- Genre: Feature film soundtrack
- Length: 29:45
- Language: Bengali
- Label: Anupam Recording Media
- Producer: Ahmed Imtiaz Bulbul, Alam Khan
External media
Audio
- Audio jukebox on YouTube
Video
- Video jukebox on YouTube

Ahmed Imtiaz Bulbul chronology
| Noyoner Kajol (1999) | Ananta Bhalobasha (1999) | Aaj Gaye Holud (2000) |

Alam Khan chronology
| Pagla Ghonta (1999) | Ananta Bhalobasha (1999) | Akheri Jobab (2000) |

The film soundtrack composed and written by Ahmed Imtiaz Bulbul. Also one song is composed by Alam Khan and one song is written by Milton Khandkar. All the songs are sung by Andrew Kishore, Runa Laila, Kanak Chapa, and Dolly Sayontoni.

Tracks listing
| No. | Title | Lyrics | Music | Singer(s) | Length |
|---|---|---|---|---|---|
| 1. | "Ei Je Duniya" | Ahmed Imtiaz Bulbul | Ahmed Imtiaz Bulbul | Andrew Kishore, Kanak Chapa | 4:39 |
| 2. | "Tumar-e Mishti Hashi" | Milton Khondokar | Alam Khan | Andrew Kishore, Dolly Sayontoni | 5:16 |
| 3. | "E Buke Likechi" | Ahmed Imtiaz Bulbul | Ahmed Imtiaz Bulbul | Andrew Kishore, Kanak Chapa | 4:39 |
| 4. | "Allah Re Morlam Re" | Ahmed Imtiaz Bulbul | Ahmed Imtiaz Bulbul | Runa Laila, Andrew Kishore | 4:44 |
| 5. | "Biye Hobere Hobe" | Ahmed Imtiaz Bulbul | Ahmed Imtiaz Bulbul | Runa Laila | 4:47 |
| Total length: | | | | | 29:45 |

== Reception ==
It took a place on the list of the 15 best films made in 1999 and returned the invested capital.

== Legacy ==
The film is marked a turning point in Bangladeshi cinema by introducing Shakib Khan, who is now one of the biggest superstars in the industry.

Through the film, director Sohanur Rahman Sohan changed the birth name of the protagonist Shakib Khan from Masud Rana to his stage name "Shakib Khan". After the news of Sohanur Rahman Sohan's death in 2023, Shakib Khan also said in an interview with The Daily Star that his stage name "Shakib Khan" was given by Sohan.
