= Keyamat Theke Keyamat =

Bangladeshi musical romantic drama film

Keyamot Theke Keyamot
- Directed by: Sohanur Rahman Sohan
- Written by: Sohanur Rahman Sohan (Screenplay); Nasir Hussain (Story); Ashish Kumar Loho (Dialogue)
- Produced by: Sukumar Ranjan Ghosh
- Starring: Salman Shah; Moushumi; Wasimul Bari Rajib; Abul Hayat; Ahmed Sharif
- Cinematography: Jahangir & Jahangir
- Edited by: Mojibor Rahman Dulu
- Music by: Anand–Milind; Alam Khan
- Production company: Anandamela Cinema Limited
- Distributed by: Anandamela Cinema Limited
- Release date: 25 March 1993
- Running time: 160 minutes
- Country: Bangladesh
- Language: Bangla
- Box office: ৳8.2 crore (equivalent to ৳59 crore or US$4.8 million in 2024)

Keyamot Theke Keyamot (Bengali: কেয়ামত থেকে কেয়ামত; transl. From doomsday till doomsday (Note: Keyamot is the term for the Islamic concept of Day of Resurrection)) is a Bangladeshi musical romantic drama film directed by Sohanur Rahman Sohan. The film was released on Eid vacation and was a huge success throughout Bangladesh. This movie was also the debut film of its two main leads Salman Shah and Moushumi, both of whom later became top movie stars in Bangladesh. The film is an official remake of the 1988 Hindi Language film titled Qayamat Se Qayamat Tak, and like its predecessor, is based on Romeo and Juliet.

== Plot ==
Mirza and Khan are two rival influential families in the village. Khan's younger son of the rich Khan family, Kabir Khan engages in a love affair with the younger Mirza sister, Dimple Mirza and makes her pregnant before dumping her. But Kabir, who's engaged to another girl, later refuses to marry Dimple after denying the allegations made by Boro Mirza which dishonours the Mirza family leading to the suicide of Dimple. Mirza Salauddin avenges death by killing Kabir, at his wedding, after showing him her body there and is sentenced to imprisonment. Boro Mirza leaves the village with Mirza Salauddin's wife Shahana and son Raj and move to Dhaka at his other's sister's house out of shame that their girl's lover will marry someone else especially after he impregnates her. He begins a successful clothing business with his brother-in-law Jamal. After Mirza Salauddin is released from prison, his son Raj falls in love with Reshma from the Khan family which resurfaces the old feud between the two families. When their families find out, they warn them to stop meeting each other. But being madly in love, they still meet secretly. Reshmi then gets engaged to her father Khan Bahadur Nazim Uddin's friend's son, Rakib Raihan, the man Raj posed as at her birthday party after he fell in love with her which heartbreaks him and shames him for loving an enemy. But Raj and Reshma elope to avoid the enmity between their families but this further complicates the situation. Khan Bahadur Nazim Uddin publishes his picture in the newspaper and offers a reward if he's found. Angered, Mirza Salauddin warns him he'll reluctantly become the killer Mirza Salauddin again if he harms Raj. Nazim Uddin, Rashmi's uncle Mukbul Hussain and cousin Selim hire killers to kill Raj when they learn their location. When they all arrive there, they send them to kill him. Nazim Uddin meets Reshmi and lies to her he accepted their marriage and has come to bring them home to which she gets thrilled. After his mother tells Raj's family about their hiring and begs them to save Raj and Rashmi's lives, Mirza Mohammad Salauddin, Boro Mirza and their nephew Sumon arrive there with her. Reshmi looks for Raj and is killed by the last surviving killer. Saddened, Raj kills him and runs to her. She dies in his arms and not tolerating to be separated from her, he commits suicide in front of his father, uncle, Sumon, Reshmi's grandma and dad. He then gives her a last kiss and lays with her. The lovers are eternally united, never to be separated.

== Cast ==
- Salman Shah as Raj
- Mousumi as Reshmi
- Rajib as Mirza Mohammad Salauddin, Raj's father
- Abul Hayat as Boro Mirza
- Ahmed Sharif as Khan Bahadur Nazim Uddin, Reshmi's father
- Shilpi as Dimple
- Mithu as Sumon
- Don as Selim
- Sirajul Islam Siraj as Khan Bahadur Roisuddin
- Jahanara Ahmed as Reshmi's grandmother
- Khaleda Akter Kolpona as Sahana, Raj's mother
- Abdur Ratin as Khan Bahadur Kabir Uddin
- Black Anwar as Jamal
- Tele Samad as Ghotok Ghuri
- Saif Uddin as Komol Ali
- Amol Bose as Talukder
- Kabir Kha
- AK Qureshi as Qureshi
- Zamilur Rahman Saka as Jailor

== Production ==
The production house Anandamela Cinema Limited bought remaking rights of three Hindi films including Qayamat Se Qayamat Tak (the others being Sanam Bewafa (1991), Dil (1990)) and proposed the director Sohanur Rahman Sohan to make a film based on one of them. Sohanur Rahman Sohan decided to make a film with completely new leads. Moushumi, who was then an emerging model, was selected for the leading female role. Initially, Amin Khan was supposed to do the film as the lead protagonist in place of Salman Shah, but he was opted out of this film by director Sohanur Rahman Sohan and producer Sukumar Ranjan Ghosh and the leading male role was eventually given to Salman Shah after it was turned down by actor Tauquir Ahmed and model Adil Hossain Nobel.

== Music ==
Alam Khan worked as the music director of this remake film while the original music in Hindi was composed by the Anand–Milind duo. Lyrics are written by Moniruzzaman Monir. Music was recorded in Anupam Recording Studio and singers were Runa Laila and Agun. The film is also the playback debut of singer Agun.

No.	Title	Lyrics	Music	Singer	Length
1.	"Baba Bole Chhele Nam Korbe (বাবা বলে ছেলে নাম করবে)"	Moniruzzaman Monir	Anand–Milind and Alam Khan	Agun	5:10
2.	"Eka Achi to Ki Hoyeche (একা আছি তো কি হয়েছে)"	Moniruzzaman Monir	Anand–Milind and Alam Khan	Runa Laila	5:51
3.	"Ekhon to Shomoy (এখন তো সময়)"	Moniruzzaman Monir	Anand–Milind and Alam Khan	Runa Laila and Agun	4:36
4.	"O Amar Bondhu Go (ও আমার বন্ধু গো)"	Moniruzzaman Monir	Anand–Milind and Alam Khan	Runa Laila and Agun	6:09
