= Bangladesh International Short and Independent Film Festival =

Film festival in Bangladesh

- Location: Dhaka, Bangladesh
- Founded: December 1988
- Language: International

The Bangladesh International Short and Independent Film Festival (BISIFF) is a biennial event held in Dhaka, Bangladesh, dedicated to showcasing contemporary short and independent films from around the world. It is organized by the Bangladesh Short Film Forum, a collective of independent filmmakers and film activists. The festival serves as a platform for emerging and established filmmakers who use cinema to express critical and artistic perspectives.

== History ==
Founded in December 1988, BISIFF was the first international short film festival in South Asia. Its inaugural edition featured globally recognized filmmakers including Polish director Krzysztof Zanussi, and Indian directors such as Mrinal Sen, Buddhadeb Dasgupta, Gautam Ghose, and Aparna Sen. Over the years, the festival has gained recognition for its commitment to artistic freedom and alternative storytelling.

== Festival program ==
The eight-day-long event is held across multiple venues in Dhaka, including the Central Public Library Auditorium, the National Museum Auditorium, and the Bangladesh Shilpakala Academy. Screenings include short fiction, documentary, animation, experimental films, and independent feature films.

The festival also features retrospectives, special country focus programs, and thematic sessions. Past retrospectives have celebrated filmmakers like Abbas Kiarostami, Kumar Shahani, and the collective work of feminist cinema groups.

== Awards ==
Since the 10th edition, the festival introduced competitive segments. Awards include:

- Best Fiction
- Best Documentary
- NETPAC Jury Award – for outstanding films from Asia
- Tareque Shahriar Best Independent Short – awarded to promising young Bangladeshi filmmakers

Award-winning films are selected by international juries comprising filmmakers, critics, and academics.

== Organizers ==
The festival is organized by the Bangladesh Short Film Forum, a non-governmental organization founded in 1986 to support independent and socially conscious cinema in Bangladesh. The Forum also operates the Bangladesh Film Center, which serves as a hub for screenings, workshops, and archives.

== Notable participants ==
Past participants include:

- Krzysztof Zanussi (Poland)
- Xie Fei (China)
- Garin Nugroho (Indonesia)
- Mrinal Sen, Buddhadeb Dasgupta, Shyam Benegal, Aparna Sen, and Gautam Ghose (India)

== See also ==
- Dhaka International Film Festival
- Bangladesh Short Film Forum
