= Khairun Sundari =

Bangladeshi film

- Khairun Sundari movie poster
- Bengali: খাইরুন সুন্দরী
- Directed by: A.K Shohel
- Written by: A.K Shohel
- Screenplay by: A.K Shohel
- Story by: A.K Shohel
- Produced by: Meghalaya Studio
- Starring: Ferdous Ahmed; Moushumi; A. T. M. Shamsuzzaman
- Music by: Emon Saha
- Distributed by: Anupam Recording Media
- Release date: 2004 (Note: Sources vary regarding the year the film was released. Fahmida Akhter, writing in Shilpakala, states 2004. Jago News 24 and Jugantor place it in 2007. United News of Bangladesh describes it in February 2006 as a "popular film", although whether they mean a style of film meant to appeal to the masses or a film that has been released and proved popular, is unclear.)
- Running time: 151 minutes
- Country: Bangladesh
- Language: Bengali
- Box office: ৳5 crore (equivalent to ৳8.6 crore or US$700,000 in 2024)

Khairun Sundari (Bengali: খাইরুন সুন্দরী; English: A Beautiful Lady, Khairun) is a 2004 Bangladeshi romantic folk‑drama film directed and written by A K Sohel and produced by Meghalaya Studio Reddit. Starring Moushumi as Khairun and Ferdous Ahmed as her husband. the film explores themes of rural love, betrayal, and tragedy inspired by a purportedly true village story from the Jamalpur region.

Released nationally in 2004, Khairun Sundari became a major commercial blockbuster and became the highest-grossing Bangladeshi film of 2004 as well as one of the highest-grossing films of all time. The title track—most notably the folk‑infused track “Khairun Lo Tor Lomba Mathar Kesh” sung by Momtaz—was a breakthrough performance by the singer. The film gained a cult following particularly in rural areas for its potent blend of folk lore, melodrama, and emotional resonance with rural female audiences. It was remade in India as Praner Swami (2007) starring Ferdous Ahmed, Rachana Banerjee & A.T.M. Shamsuzzaman.

== Plot ==
The story is inspired by a widely circulated folk tale said to have unfolded in the 1960s in Jamalpur district:

In Baksiganj's Merurchar village lives a young girl named Khairun, daughter of a master snake charmer known as Azgar Master. One day, Fazal Haq, a local betel-vendor from nearby Barkhali village, sees her and falls deeply in love. They marry with family approval and begin a happy life together.

Tragedy strikes when Fazal’s friend, harboring jealousy and mistrust, deliberately sets fire to their home. In the chaos, Fazal mistakenly kills his own son. Haunted and unsettled, he later teams up with local criminals to murder Khairun. Her body is thrown into the river where it is found the next day. Her death sparks outrage in the village; neighbors identify her corpse and public protests lead to Fazal’s arrest. He is sentenced to prison and serves many years.

After serving his sentence, Fazal is eventually released—reports say special clemency is granted—and he remarries. Meanwhile, Khairun becomes enshrined in local legend as Khairun Sundari, a tragic symbol of love, betrayal, and martyrdom.

== Cast ==
- Ferdous Ahmed
- Moushumi
- A.T.M. Shamsuzzaman

== Music ==
- "Khairun Lo Tor Lomba Mathar Kesh" - Momtaz Begum (it gained popularity across the country)
  All tracks are written by Wadud Rangeela.
  No.	Title	Length
  1.	"Moner Manush Pailam Re"	4:59
  2.	"Nitti Nitti Udoy Re Surjo"	3:40
  3.	"Khairun Lo"	3:56
  4.	"Biyar Dhum"	5:6
  5.	"Mathar Keso Diya Bondhu"	2:09
  6.	"Dada Go Tor Hat Dhoria Koi"	2:24
