= BSFF =

BSFF may stand for:

- Bangladesh Short Film Forum, an organization of young Bangladeshi filmmakers
- Brussels Short Film Festival, an annual film festival in Brussels, Belgium
