= Ekattorer Jishu =

Bangladeshi film

- Poster
- Directed by: Nasiruddin Yousuf Bachchu
- Based on: Ekattorer Jishu (novel) by Shahriar Kabir
- Starring: Pijush Banerjee; Humayun Faridi; Abul Khair
- Music by: Shimul Yusuf
- Release date: 1993
- Running time: 100 minutes
- Country: Bangladesh
- Language: Bengali

Ekattorer Jishu (Eng. Jesus of Seventy one, Bengali: একাত্তরের যীশু) is a 1993 Bangladeshi film based on the Bangladesh Liberation War. The film was directed by Nasir Uddin Yusuf and based on the novel Ekattorer Jishu by Shahriar Kabir. The film stars Piyush Bandyopadhyay, Humayun Faridi, Zahir Uddin Pial, Abul Khair, Anwar Farooq, Kamal Bayazid, Litu Anam and Shahiduzzaman Selim in the lead roles. Besides, Ibrahim Bidyut, Shatdal Barua Bilu, Saifuddin Ahmed Dulal, Faruk Ahmed, Yusuf Khasru, Delwar Hossain and many others have acted in different roles.

== Synopsis ==
Background In 1971, a fierce battle was going on in the territory of East Pakistan (present day Bangladesh). The story is about the life of a people of fisherman. The war has not yet spread to the villages. The fishermen of Jelepara (Fishervalley) catch fish, then take it to the market and sell it. There also had a church in the village. Most of the fishermen in the village were Christians. Desmond, the church caretaker, rang the church bell every Sunday morning. And then all the people of the village used to come to that church. Father would tell them the story of Jesus from the Bible. Everything was going well. But one day war broke out in their village. Fishermen were sitting in the market that day, sitting and fishing; No one comes to buy fish anymore. Suddenly they hear someone chanting 'Joy Bangla' (Victory of Bengal) and then the sound of gunfire. The Pak army attacked. The fishermen started fleeing wherever they could. But not everyone could escape. One of them, Haripada, was shot dead by Pakistani forces.

The war was going on in the city then. People have started fleeing the city in droves to India, where there is no Pak army violence. Some are going only for shelter, and some will return to the country with training and defeat the enemy. The people of Jelepara saw people in groups, just walking and walking. No food, no medicine. No place to sleep at night. There is no treatment if you are sick. People are just walking. If someone dies, they are lying on the side of the road. Those who are sick are also walking. The master of the fisherman gathered all the people there and then he started serving people outside this city. How many tents he made for them overnight. Arrangements were made to stay there overnight with sheets and mats from everyone in the village. Khichuri was cooked for everyone from house to house with rice and pulses. But as the medical arrangements were not made by the people of the fisherman, so the master went and asked the father of the church to give him the medicine kept in the church. He added that the sisters should take care of the sick people. The father wondered again whether he would involve the church in this war. But not being able to bear the suffering of so many people, Father allowed the sisters to take responsibility of everyone's treatment. Overnight the master, his students, old Desmond and the sisters together served, fed and treated the people who had fled the city.

The next morning all the people started their journey to India again. The tents became empty again. But as he turned around, old Desmond saw a cute girl at the base of a tree, one of the refugees. Desmond asked her the name, the name of the village, but the girl could not say anything. Desmond later realized that the girl was dumb! Desmond began to spend time behind the girl. He tells the story - the story of Jesus. The leaves make the flute, play and sound.

Another day news came in the village that the Pak army had come to the market. They set fire to the market. Village after village is burning. He is shooting whoever he finds. The father of another village church was stabbed with a bayonet. Children-old, young-old, father-fisherman, they are not leaving anyone, they are killing everyone. All the people of the village began to flee in fear. Father himself fled the church. All that was left was old Desmond and that cute girl. Meanwhile, the Pak army also came to this jail. Desmond told the girl not to leave the house. And went to see for himself the situation outside. Meanwhile, the Pak army came out of the house and started killing everyone. Desmond returned to the village and saw that the Pak army had set fire to the whole village and left nothing behind. As many houses as there were, everything was burnt down. All the people were killed. No one survives. They also killed girls. And the corpse of that cute dumb girl is lying in the middle of those corpses. Desmond hugged the girl and sobbed. He was buried and a small cross was buried near his head. This time Desmond was completely alone in the world.

Meanwhile, the master has gone to war long ago. His army needs a small group of people to stay. The master sent a party of them to Desmond and Desmond understood long ago that this war is everyone's war. This war is not a political war, this war is the war of his life. Everyone has to do something now. Desmond also gave them shelter. He still lives in his little room next to that church. He let them stay there too. He fed them and took care of them. And they started preparing for war from here.

A few days later, they came out in a small operation. A Pakistani camp must be attacked. The camp is not very big. Their team is enough to do the operation. They left with a blessing from Desmond. And then the Pak army in the camp lost in a fierce battle. They killed all of them in battle. This time a big operation will be done. The largest camp of Pakistanis in the vicinity is in Kamalganj. They will attack this camp. Two or four teams will attack from the back and one side. On the other side there will be three teams including their team. And three teams including the master's team will lead the attack from the front. A total of 10 groups attacked the Pakistani camp in Kamalganj. With all the preparations, they left with a blessing from Desmond . The battle started in Kamalganj camp. He is a terrible war! The camp of Pakistani forces there is also very strong and cannot be occupied in any way.

The freedom fighters won the war. Then from there some freedom fighters were returning happy. On the way, they fell into the ambush of the Pak army in the dark forest. Somehow escaped He took refuge in the church. Some died there. Those who survived were shot and killed, but could not kill members of the Pak army. Eventually they were captured by the Pak army. They want to know the identity of the freedom fighters when they get Desmond, the caretaker of the church. But Desmond refused to save his life, knowing the freedom fighters, while he has nurtured them for a few days. The Pak army saw the crucified statue of Jesus in front of the church and dragged the three freedom fighters into the field. Desmond wept bitterly. He had nothing to do!

== Cast ==
- Piyush Banerjee - Father of the church
- Humayun Faridi - Desmond, church caretaker
- Zahir Uddin Pial -
- Abul Khair -
- Anwar Farooq
- Litu Anam
- Kamal Bayazid -
- Ibrahim Biddyut
- Shatdal Barua Bilu
- Saifuddin Ahmed Dulal -
- Farooq Ahmed -
- Shahiduzzaman Selim
- Yusuf Khasru -
- Delwar Hossain -
- Palash -
- Liton -
- Sajjad -
- Pabel -
- Shoaib -
- Badal -
- Florence Sharmili Gomez -

== Production ==
The film "Ekattorer Jesu (Jesus of the Seventy One)" was shot in a village called Tuital in the Nayanshree Union of Nawabganj Upazila of Dhaka District and in the "Tuital Holy Spirit Church" located by the Ichamati river.

== Awards and honors ==
=== National ===
- National Film Awards
- Best Dialogue: Selim Al Deen 1993

=== International ===
- Nomination: London International Film Festival 1994
- Nomination: Edinburgh (Scotland) International Film Festival 1993
- Nomination: Brisbane International Film Festival 1994

== Music ==
Shimul Yusuf has composed the music and composed the lyrics for the film Jesus of 1971.
