= Esha Yousuff =

Bangladeshi film producer

Esha Yousuff এশা ইউসুফ
- Occupation: Film producer
- Spouse: Saqi Banerjee (m. 2019)
- Parent(s): Nasiruddin Yousuff (father); Shimul Yousuff (mother)

Esha Yousuff is a Bangladeshi film producer.

== Biography ==
Esha Yousuff is the daughter of Nasiruddin Yousuff and Shimul Yousuff. Gureilla was the first film which was produced by her. This film won National Film Award in 10 categories, including Best Film. She worked as executive producer in Olpo Olpo Premer Golpo which was released in 2014. She worked in Aynabaji as executive producer too. This film won National Film Award in 7 categories. She worked as producer in Alpha which film was released in 2019. It is the submission of Bangladesh to the 92nd Academy Awards for the Academy Award for Best Foreign Language Film.

Esha Yousuff married Saqi Banerjee on 11 October 2019. Saqi Banerjee is the vocalist of Bangladesh Band: Bhramaputra-Bangladesh

== Filmography ==
Year	Film	Role
2011	Guerilla	Producer
2014	Olpo Olpo Premer Golpo	Executive Producer
2016	Aynabaji	Executive Producer
2019	Alpha	Producer
