= Aami Sei Meye =

- Theatrical release poster
- Directed by: Prosenjit Chatterjee
- Written by: Prosenjit chaterjee
- Produced by: Ashoke dhanuka
- Starring: Jaya Prada; Prosenjit Chatterjee; Rituparna Sengupta; Ranjit Mallick; Abhishek Chatterjee; Alamgir; Sanghamitra Bandyopadhyay; Asrani; Shahin Alam
- Music by: Tabun Sutradhar
- Release date: 1998
- Countries: India; Bangladesh
- Language: Bengali
- Budget: ₹ 60 lakhs

Aami Sei Meye (transl. I am that girl) is a 1998 Bengali film directed by Prosenjit Chatterjee. This is the 2nd directorial film of Prosenjit Chatterjee under the banner of Dhanuka Brothers Pvt. Ltd. The film features actors Prosenjit Chatterjee, Rituparna Sengupta, Ranjit Mallick, Abhishek Chatterjee, and Alamgir in the lead roles. Famous Tollywood (Telugu) and Bollywood actress Jaya Prada made her debut in Bengali movies with this. The music of the film was composed by Tabun Sutradhar.

== Cast ==
- Jaya Prada
- Alamgir
- Ranjit Mallick
- Prosenjit Chatterjee
- Rituparna Sengupta
- Abhishek Chatterjee
- Sanghamitra Bandyopadhyay
- Asrani
- Shahin Alam
- Kobita

== Music ==
The film's music was composed by Tabun Sutradhar. The songs were sung by Udit Narayan, Kumar Sanu and Kavita Krishnamurthy.

It contained the chartbuster song "Aguner Din Sesh Hobe Ekdin", sung by Kumar Sanu and Kavita Krishnamurthy.
