= Shafiul Islam Mohiuddin =

Bangladeshi businessman

- শফিউল ইসলাম মহিউদ্দিন
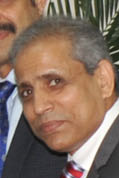
- Mohiuddin in 2015

Member of Parliament
- In office 21 March 2020 – 29 January 2024
- Preceded by: Sheikh Fazle Noor Taposh
- Succeeded by: Ferdous Ahmed
- Constituency: Dhaka-10

Personal details
- Born: 24 April 1955 (age 71) Dhaka, East Pakistan, Pakistan
- Party: Bangladesh Awami League
- Education: University of Dhaka
- Known for: Businessman

Shafiul Islam Mohiuddin is a Bangladeshi business leader. He was the Member of Parliament of the Dhaka-10. He is the former president of Federation of Bangladesh Chambers of Commerce and Industries (FBCCI). He led the RMG sector of the country over thirty years and became the president of Bangladesh Garment Manufacturers and Exporters Association (BGMEA), the largest export earning sector of the country.

== Early life and education ==
Mohiuddin obtained B.Com (Hon's) and M.Com degree in accountancy from University of Dhaka.

== Career ==
Mohiuddin was involved with the RMG sector of the country over thirty years. He entered the garment industry in 1992 by establishing Onus Apparel Ltd. Since then he has started his export oriented garments industry named Onus Group, the largest export earning sector of the country. He has also successfully diversified his business in other business sectors like garment accessories, real estate, shipping, fishing, trawlers, dredging, solar energy, auto bricks, handicrafts, etc. He has currently employed over six thousand people in his business group. He is the director of Trustee Board, BGMEA University of Fashion and Technology (BUFT). He is also the vice president of Society for Anti addiction Movement (SAAM), Centre of Excellence for Bangladesh Apparel Industry (CEBAI) and Rugby Federation, Director of Mohammedan Sporting Club Limited, Director of BGMEA Apparel Club.

On 26 November 2023 Awami League announced the final list of its 298 candidates to contest the 2024 national election which did not include Mohiuddin.

During COVID-19, he participated in the premier’s task force to launch the “Life & Livelihood Has to Go Together” initiative to begin the orderly rehabilitation of the nation’s financial system.
