= Koti Takar Prem =

Bangladeshi action romance film

Koti Takar Prem (কোটি টাকার প্রেম)
- Movie poster
- Directed by: Sohanur Rahman Sohan
- Written by: Chotku Ahmed
- Screenplay by: Sohanur Rahaman Sohan
- Story by: Anonno Mamun
- Produced by: S.S.K world Multimedia Production
- Starring: Shakib Khan; Apu Biswas; Misha Sawdagor; Abul Hayat; Don; Rina Khan; Mizu Ahmed
- Cinematography: Asaduzzaman Monju
- Edited by: Akramul Haque
- Music by: Shawkat Ali Emon
- Production company: S.S.K world Multimedia Production
- Distributed by: Pinky Films
- Release date: 24 June 2011
- Country: Bangladesh
- Language: Bengali

Koti Takar Prem (Bengali: কোটি টাকার প্রেম; English: Million Dollars Love) is a Bangladeshi Bengali-language action romance film directed by Sohanur Rahman Sohan. The film was produced by Sharif Udin Khan and features Shakib Khan, Apu Biswas and Misha Sawdagor in the lead roles.

== Cast ==
- Shakib Khan
- Apu Biswas
- Misha Sawdagor
- Don
- Siraj Haider
- Abul Hayat
- Rina Khan
- Mizu Ahmed

== Music ==
The film's music was directed by Shokit Ali Imon.
