= Ek Cup Cha =

- Ek Cup Cha Movie Poster
- Directed by: Noyeem Imtiaz Neyamul
- Written by: Basu Chaterjee
- Produced by: Ferdous Ahmed
- Starring: Ferdous Ahmed; Moushumi; Rituporna Sengupta; Dr.Ezazul Islam; Monira Mithu
- Cinematography: Basu Chaterjee
- Music by: Emon Saha
- Distributed by: Nuzhat Films
- Release date: 28 November 2014
- Running time: 128 minutes
- Country: Bangladesh
- Language: Bengali

Ek Cup Cha (transl. One cup tea) (Bengali: এক কাপ চা) is a 2014 Bangladeshi romantic film directed by Noyeem Imtiaz Neyamul. It stars Ferdous Ahmed and Moushumi in the central roles, alongside Omar Sani, Rituparna Sengupta, father and daughter duo Alamgir and Akhi Alamgir, and Humayun Faridi. It was Faridi's final film, he died before it was released.

The shooting of Ek Cup Cha started on October 15, 2010. But for different circumstances regarding producers, it could not be released. It was the first film produced by actor Ferdous Ahmed. It was finally released in 60 cinema halls in Bangladesh on November 28, 2014.

== Story ==
A professor of English of a college Shafiq (Ferdous Ahmed) falls in love with a librarian Deepa (Moushumi) but he cannot tell this to her. He kept a rose on Deepa's table every day. Suddenly, he decided to tell her about his love and asked Deepa to take a cup of tea with him. He faces some difficulties in his way. Kolkata super star Rituparna Sengupta is seen in a bar in a special appearance. Humayun Faridi acted as a doctor in this film.

== Cast ==
- Ferdous Ahmed as Shafiqur Rahman
- Moushumi as Deepa
- Rituporna Sengupta as Dilruba
- Dr.Ezazul Islam as Mr. Gomez, Deepa's landowner
- Monira Mithu as Mrs. Gomez, Deepa's landowners wife
- Kabila as Facebook
- Nayok Raj Razzak
- Humayun Faridi as Dr. Afzal Chowdhury
- Amol Bose
- Alamgir
- Ankhi Alamgir
- Mir Sabbir
- Nipun
- Shakib Khan as himself (special appearance)
- Emon as special appearance
- Nirob as special appearance
- Shahidul Alam Sachchu
- Omar Sani
- Ahmed Sharif as police inspector
- Anis as grocery shopkeeper
- Saif Babu as Salman
- Humaira Himu as Rosy
- Farhana Nisho as news presenter

== Soundtrack ==
The music of this film was composed by Emon Saha and lyrics were penned by Kabir Bakul. Lilua Batas Soi Go, a song by popular writer Humayun Ahmed has been included in the film. Before his death, it was his last penned song.

== Reception ==
=== Critical response ===
Rafi Hossain and M. H. Haider, writing for The Daily Star, called the film "at best, above average" and said, "One may argue that the film was a bit overhyped; and many among the audience might not have had their expectations met."

=== Accolades ===
Meril Prothom Alo Awards

- Critics Choice Award for Best Film Actress - Moushumi - Won

National Film Awards

- Best Actor - Ferdous Ahmed - Won

BACHSAS Awards

- Best Actor - Ferdous Ahmed - Won
