= Shampa Reza =

Bangladeshi actress

- শম্পা রেজা
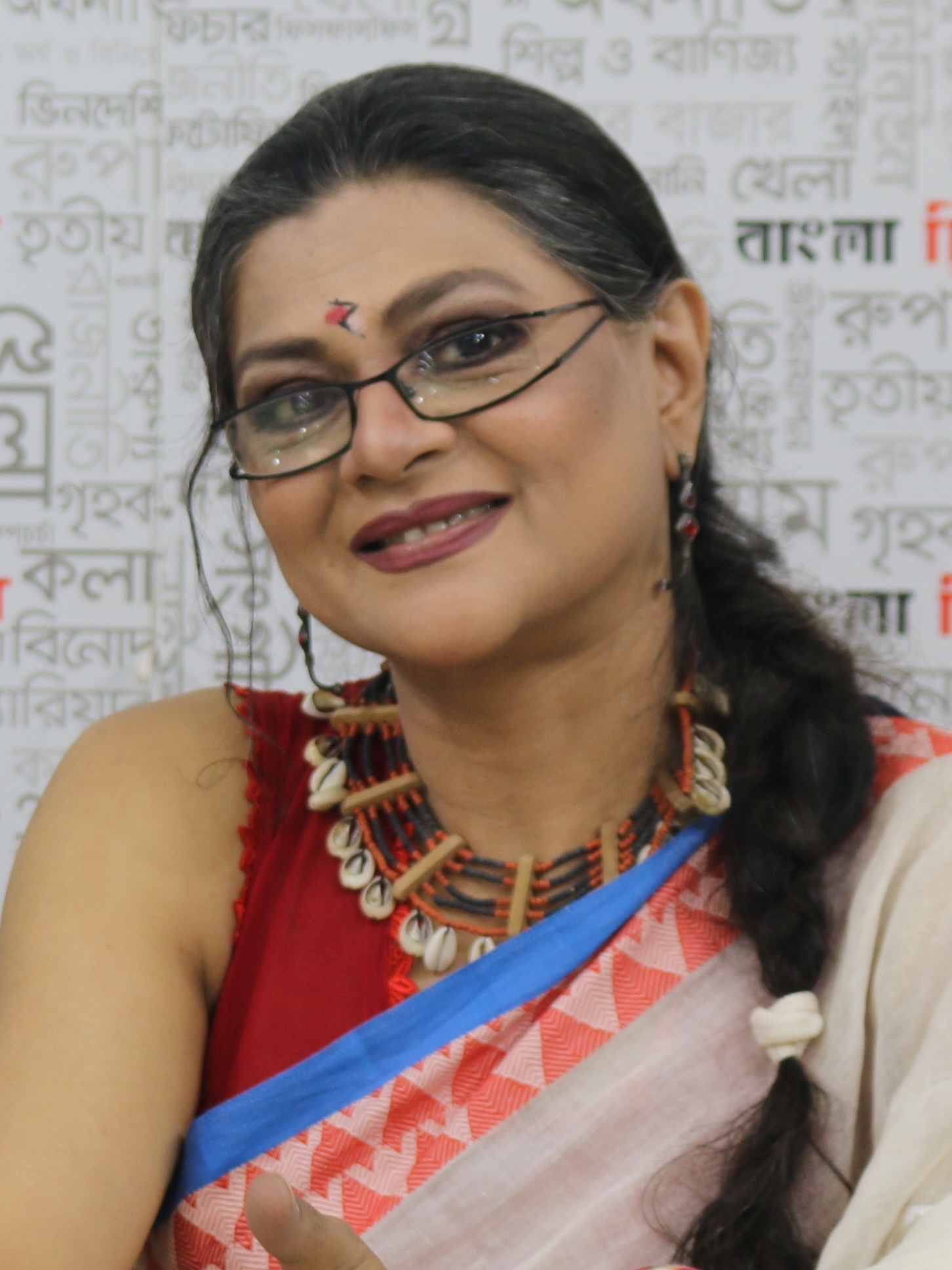
- Reza in 2017
- Education: Visva-Bharati University; BAF Shaheen College Dhaka; Holy Cross Girls' High School
- Occupations: Singer, actor, model
- Children: 2
- Parents: Ahmed Reza (father); Hasina Reza (mother)
- Relatives: Papia Sarwar (aunt)

Shampa Reza is a Bangladeshi singer, model, actress and television host.

== Early life and education ==
Shampa Reza was born to Ahmed Reza and Hasina Reza (d. 2022), a singer. Ahmed was the commander of Naval Commando Force of Bangladesh Army in 1971 Liberation War; he was a fighter-bomber pilot, trained the naval commandos in exile in absence of naval officers, served as the director of youth and reception camp and trained around 100,000 guerillas. After 1971, he worked in different capacities within the government of Bangladesh and retired as the chairman of Muktijoddha Kalyan Trust.

Shampa Reza's siblings are Rini Reza, Nipa Reza, Masum Reza and Azam Reza. Shampa started singing at the age of four. During the Bangladesh Liberation War in 1971, her family sheltered in Kalyani refugee camp in India.

Reza studied in Holy Cross School, Dhaka and BAF Shaheen College Dhaka. She went to Shantiniketan to study in Visva-Bharati University in 1976. Her instructor was Guru Pandit Dhruva Tara Joshi.

== Career ==
In 1975, when Reza was in grade 10, her acting career began with a role in the play Ostrotogandha, directed by Selim Al Deen. She got her acting breakthrough in the television drama Idiot. In January 2015, she was conferred A Showbiz Fashion Icon by the newspaper The Daily Star.

Reza hosted a chat show, Alor Atithi O Shampa, for RTV in 2006.

Reza won the 33rd Bachsas Awards of Best Supporting Actress for her role in the film Guerilla (2011). She then performed in the 2016 film Rina Brown, based on Bangladesh Liberation War. She completed an action thriller film Before I Die, a late 2022 release. In 2023, she appeared in Chorki's web series Internsheep.

== Personal life ==
Shampa Reza was married to Harold Rasheed Chowdhury and Alauddin Ali. Reza has two sons – Dhrubo and Tiyash. She also has a granddaughter.

Reza is the founder of the school Rodela Chottor. She founded another school in Sylhet, Anandaniketan, which enrolled around 800 students in 2006.

Reza's brother, Azam Reza, is serving life sentence for murdering his wife, Joyonti Reza, since 2004.

Reza's maternal aunt was singer Papia Sarwar.
