= Abul Hayat =

Bangladeshi actor

- আবুল হায়াত
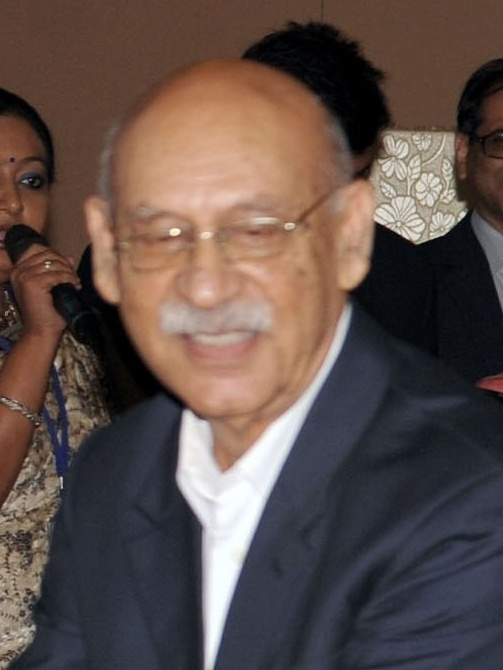
- Hayat in 2018
- Pronunciation: [abul hae̯at̪]
- Born: 7 September 1944 (age 81); Murshidabad, Bengal Presidency, British India
- Education: Bangladesh University of Engineering and Technology
- Occupations: Actor, writer, civil engineer, director
- Years active: 1969-present
- Spouses: Shirin Hayat (m. 1970)
- Children: Bipasha; Natasha
- Relatives: Tauquir Ahmed (son-in-law); Shahed Sharif Khan (son-in-law)
- Awards: See full list

Abul Hayat (Note: Bengali: [abul hae̯at̪].) (Bengali: [abul hae̯at̪]; born 7 September 1944) is a Bangladeshi actor. He is also a writer, civil engineer, and director. He earned the Bangladesh National Film Award for Best Supporting Actor for the film Daruchini Dwip (2007) and was awarded the Ekushey Padak for his acting in 2015 by the Government of Bangladesh. He portrayed the Misir Ali character in the television film Onno Bhuboner Cheleta.

== Education ==
Hayat completed his bachelor's in civil engineering from the Bangladesh University of Engineering and Technology (BUET).

== Early life and career ==
Hayat was born on 7 September 1944, in Murshidabad, located in what is now known as West Bengal in India, to a Muslim family. He and his family later moved to Chittagong in what was then East Pakistan due to his father's job transfer. He was an executive engineer of Dhaka WASA. Later, in 1978, he moved to Libya and worked there till 1981. He returned to Bangladesh in 1981 and started working in a private job, resigning from his government service.

Hayat acted in over 1000 television dramas. His debut role in television was in Oedipus in 1969, and his debut film was Titash Ekti Nadir Naam, a joint-venture film of India and Bangladesh released in 1973. He played Shakib Khan's father in Sohanur Rahman Sohan's romance Ananta Bhalobasha in 1999, which marked Khan's on-screen debut. He is the founder member of the theatre group Nagorik Natya Sampradaya.

As of February 2015, Hayat has written 28 books in total. He wrote his first book, Trishnar Shanti, in 1989.

== Personal life ==
Hayat married Shirin Hayat on 4 February 1970. Together, they have two daughters, Bipasha Hayat and Natasha Hayat, who are actresses. His sons-in-law, Tauquir Ahmed and Shahed Sharif Khan, are actors too.

== Filmography ==
=== Films ===
Year	Title	Role	Director	Notes
1972	Arunodoyer Agnishakkhi		Subhash Dutta	
1973	Titash Ekti Nadir Naam	Thakur	Ritwik Ghatak	Indo-Bangladesh co-production; debut film
1975	Choritrohin		Baby Islam	
1978	Badhu Biday	Master Moshai	Kazi Zahir	
1992	Shonkhonil Karagar	Abed Hossen	Mustafizur Rahman	
1993	Keyamat Theke Keyamat	Boro Mirza	Sohanur Rahman Sohan	
1995	Shopner Thikana	Hashmi, Sumon's father	M.A. Khaleq	
1995	Aguner Poroshmoni	Matin Uddin	Humayun Ahmed	
1997	Baba Keno Chakor	Iqbal	Razzak	
1997	Praner Cheye Priyo		Mohammad Hannan	
1999	Ananta Bhalobasha	Afzal Chowdhury	Sohanur Rahman Sohan	
2004	Joyjatra	Ramkrishna	Tauquir Ahmed	
2005	Amar Shopno Tumi	Shahed's father	Hasibul Islam Mizan	
2006	Rupkothar Golpo	Doctor	Tauquir Ahmed	Doctor, Special Appearance
2007	Daruchini Dwip	Sobhan	Tauquir Ahmed	Won Bangladesh National Film Award for Best Supporting Actor
2008	Rabeya	Rabeya's father	Tanvir Mokammel	
2009	Third Person Singular Number	Rahman	Mostofa Sarwar Farooki	
2010	Gohine Shobdo		Khalid Mahmud Mithu	
2011	Koti Takar Prem		Sohanur Rahman Sohan	
2011	Tiger Number One			
2015	Omi O Ice Cream Wala		Sumon Dhar	
2015	Dui Prithibi		F I Manik	
2016	Oggatonama	Sheikh Abdul Hakim, Wahab's father	Tauquir Ahmed	
2017	To Be Continued		Iftekhar Ahmed Fahmi	
2019	Fagun Haway	Deepti's grandfather	Tauquir Ahmed	
2021	Sphulingo	Teacher	Tauquir Ahmed	
2021	Raat Jaga Phool	Jobbar Master	Mir Sabbir	
2025	DayMukti		Badiul Alam Khokon	

=== Television ===
- Ei Shob Din Ratri (1985)
- Bohubrihi (1988)
- Ayomoy (1990)
- Aaj Robibar (1996)
- House Full (2008–2009)
- FnF (2010)

=== Web series ===
- Nayan Rahasya Feluda (2019)

== Awards ==
- Ekushey Padak (2015)
- Bangladesh National Film Award for Best Supporting Actor (2007)
