= Tuital Holy Spirit Church =

Catholic church in Bangladesh

- তুইতাল পবিত্র আত্মার গির্জা
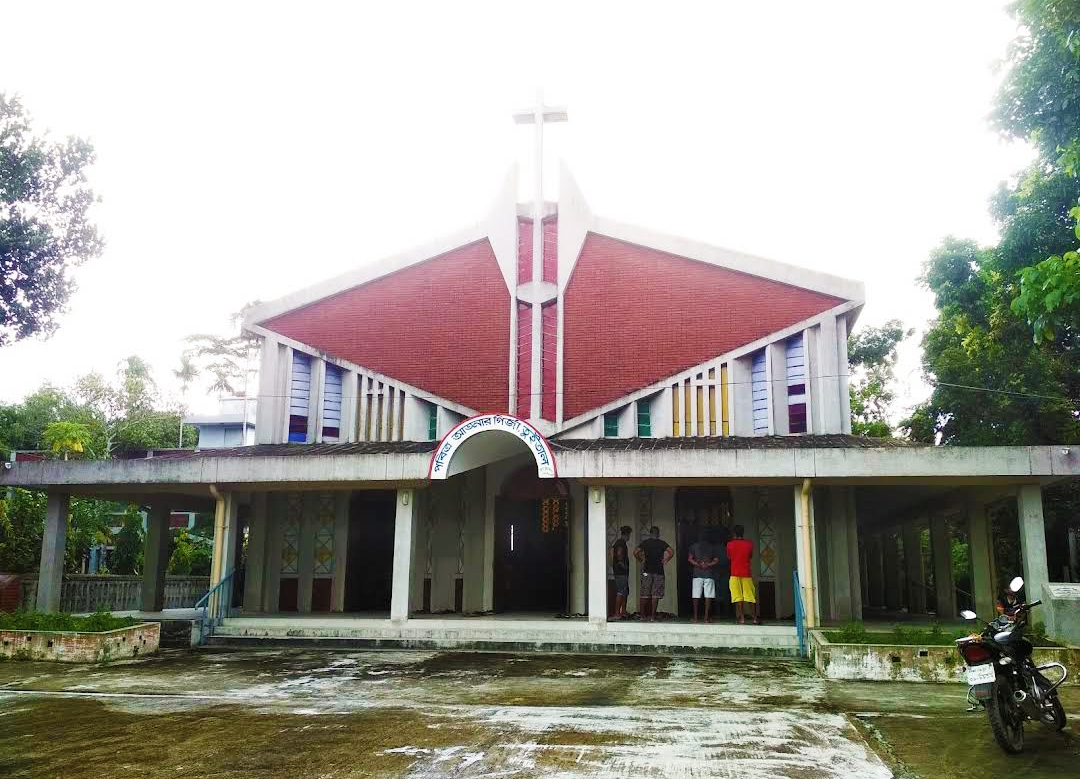
- Tuital Holy Spirit Church
- Tuital Holy Spirit Church
- 23.6924°N 90.1019°E
- Location: Tuital Nawabganj
- Country: Bangladesh
- Denomination: Roman Catholic

History
- Status: Church
- Founded: 15 May 1894; 132 years ago

Architecture
- Functional status: Active

The Tuitial Holy Spirit Church is a Roman Catholic Church situated in Dharmapalli, Tuitial, Nayanshree Union, Nawabganj Upazila, Dhaka Division, Bangladesh. It is the sole Catholic Church in the village.

== Overview ==
Before becoming a separate church, it used to be a part of a church in Hasnabad.

The church was formally established on May 15, 1894, with the founding of Tuitial Dharmapalli. To accommodate the increasing number of worshippers, a new church building named ‘Tuitial Church of the Holy Spirit’ was constructed adjacent to the original structure in 1924.

The 1993 film Ekattorer Jishu (Jesus of '71), based on Shahriar Kabir's novel of the same name, was filmed near the Church and along the banks of the Ichamati River.

== Gallery ==
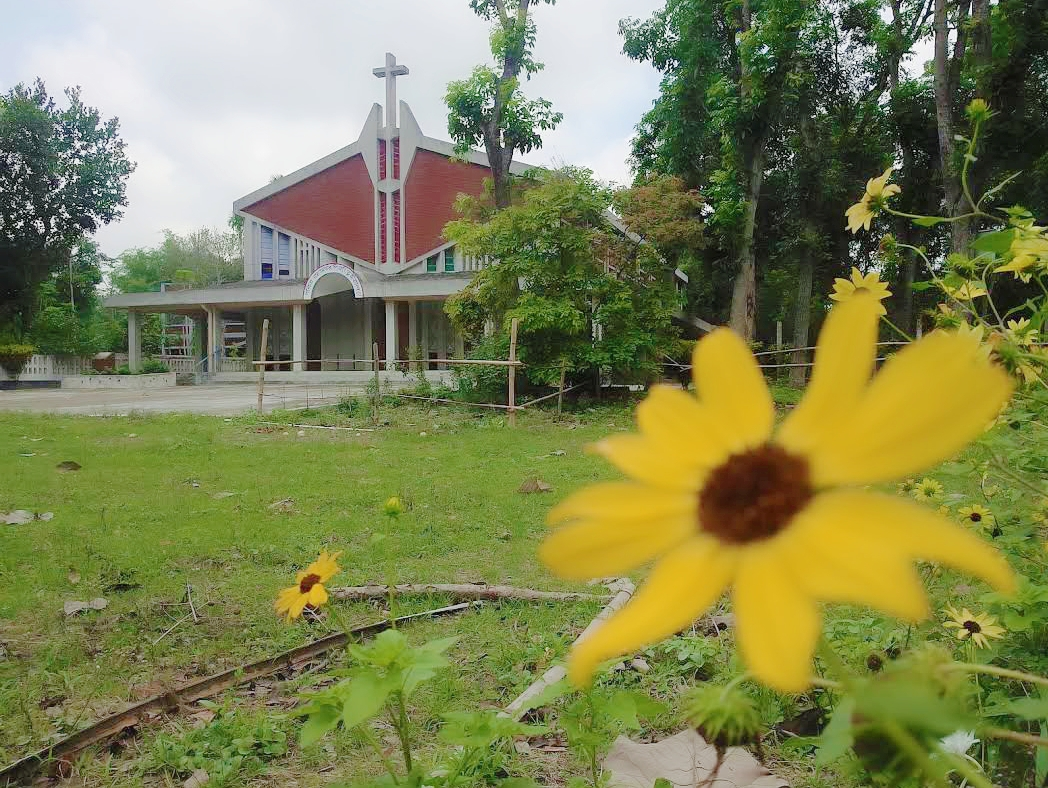

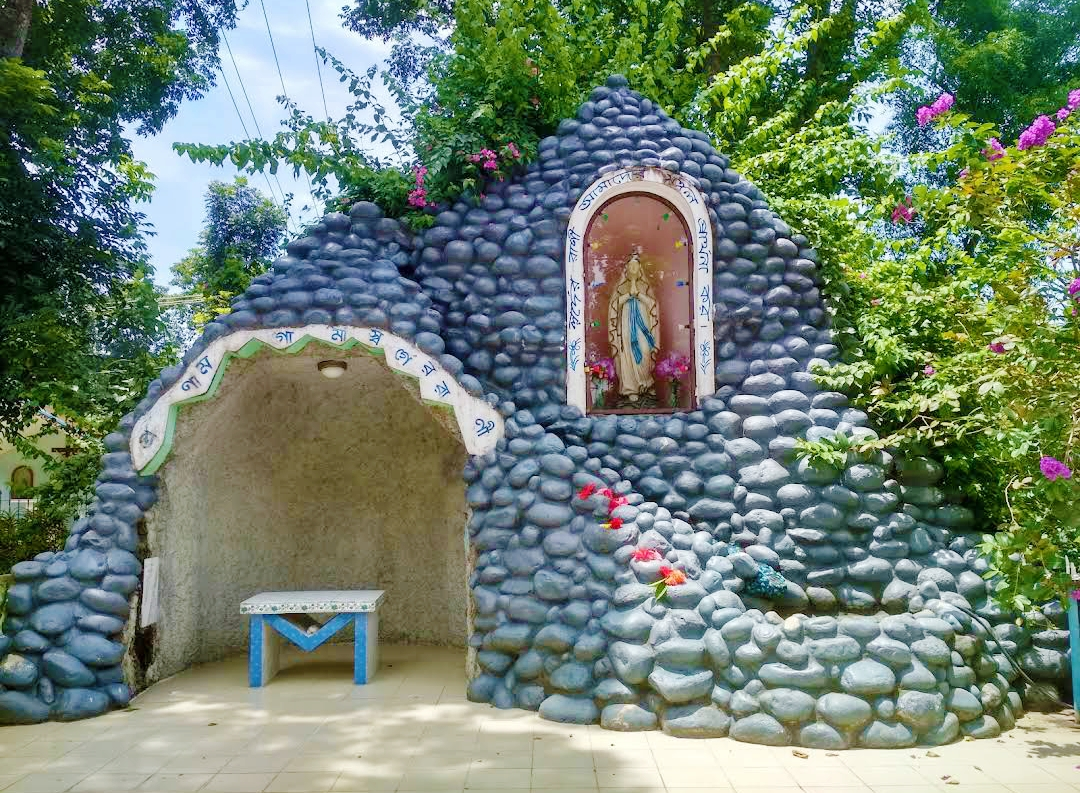
