= Humaira Himu =

Bangladeshi actress (1985–2023)

- হুমাইরা হিমু
- Born: Humaira Nusrat Himu; 23 November 1985; Lakshmipur, Bangladesh
- Died: 2 November 2023 (aged 37); Dhaka, Bangladesh
- Cause of death: Suicide by hanging
- Occupation: Actress
- Years active: 2005–2023

Humaira Nusrat Himu, better known as Humaira Himu (Bengali: হুমায়রা হিমু; 23 November 1985 – 2 November 2023) was a Bangladeshi television and film actress. She made her film debut in Amar Bondhu Rashed in 2011. She had appeared in TV dramas like DB, Sanghat, Chairman Bari, Batighor, and Shonena She Shonena.

== Early life ==
Himu was born in Lakshmipur District on 23 November 1985 as the only child to Sana Ullah (d. 2022) and Shamim Ara Chowdhury (d. 2020). She started working on theatre at an early stage. She worked at local cultural organisations - HiFi Koutuk Shilpogoshthi and Friends Natyogoshthi. In 1999, she moved to Dhaka after her Secondary School Certificate exams. She worked at several theatre groups including Nagorik Natyangan. It has been reported that Himu got married as a teenager but the marriage didn't last.

== Career ==
Himu mostly worked in television dramas. She made her television drama debut with 'PI' and film debut with Amar Bondhu Rashed in 2011 with the role "Toru Apa".

== Death ==
Himu died on 2 November 2023 at the age of 37. There was a debate going on whether her death was a suicide or murder. In September 2024, it was confirmed that her death was a suicide. Rapid Action Battalion arrested her boyfriend Mohammad Ziauddin alias Rufi alias Urfi Zia on accusation of being involved in her death. Rufi was also Himu's cousin's ex-husband who was currently married to someone else. According to Rufi, Himu committed suicide by hanging from a ceiling structure after an altercation with him regarding financial affairs. Himu and Rufi would often fight about marriage and gambling. Rufi has also said that she attempted to hang herself before when things did not go her way as a way to blackmail, but she would eventually come down.

Therefore, when she went to commit suicide, Rufi did not know that Himu would end her life at that moment. Rufi watched Himu committing suicide in her bedroom while he was sitting on her bed. When Himu hung herself, Rufi and makeup artist Mihir took her to the hospital, where the doctors confirmed she was deceased. When the doctors noticed a spot on her neck, they assumed that she might’ve committed suicide so they called the police. Before the police arrived, Rufi took Himu to the hospital and then later ran away with Himu’s two cell phones and her car. When the RAB caught Rufi, he said he wanted to sell those phones. Himu’s body was taken for autopsy and then her namaz-e-janaza was held at Channel i premises. She was then buried beside her mother’s grave in Lakshmipur.

== Works ==
Television dramas

- Action Goyenda
- Batighor
- Bokulpur
- Chairman Bari
- Chapabaj
- Chhaya Bibi
- Choumohol
- Comedy 420
- DB
- E Kemon Protidin
- Ek Mela Dui Pocket
- Ganyer Manush
- Ghor Kutum
- Gulshan Avenue
- Jamai Dawat
- KaNcher Ful
- Mirza Bari'r Meye
- Moti Behara
- Noashal
- Sanghat
- Shanto Kutir
- Shonena She Shonena
- Tamasha
- Tomar Dowa-e Bhalo Achhi Ma
- Uttoradhikar
