= Minu Haque =

- মীনু হক
- Education: MA (psychology)
- Alma mater: University of Dhaka
- Spouse: Shahudul Haque
- Parents: Meter Billah (father); Mina Billah (mother)
- Relatives: Shimul Yousuf (sister)
- Awards: Ekushey Padak (2018)

Minu Haque (née Billah) is a Bangladeshi dancer and choreographer. She specialises in Odissi dance.

== Early life and career ==
Haque was born to her parents Meter Billah and Mina Billah. Haque started dancing at the age of 5. She was trained by Dulal Talukder. Later she joined Bulbul Academy of Fine Arts (BAFA) in 1967. She completed her matriculation in 1968 from Motijheel Girl's High School.

During the Liberation War of Bangladesh in 1971, Haque served as a nurse in Bishramganj, Agartala (Field Sector 2), India. In 1977, she completed her master's in Psychology at the University of Dhaka. She is associated with the Bangladesh Dance Artist Association. She founded an Odissi dance school called Pallavi Dance Center in 1997.

She is serving as the President of the Bangladesh Nrittya Shilpi Shongstha.

== Personal life ==
Haque is married to Shahudul Haque. Together they have two sons. Actress Shimul Yousuf is Haque's sister. Her another sister, Sarah Mahmud, was married to music composer Altaf Mahmud.

== Awards ==
- Ekushey Padak (2018)
