= Mirana Zaman =

Bangladeshi actress

- মিরানা জামান
- Born: 25 December 1936 (age 89); Dhaka, Bangladesh
- Occupations: Actress; RJ
- Years active: 1962–present

Mirana Zaman (born 25 December 1936) is a Bangladeshi actress and RJ. She mainly works in theatre, television and films. She started her career in 1962 at Bangladesh Betar as a voice artist. She made her film debut with the film Jahan Baje Shehnai (1968) and later appeared in films like Dhire Bohe Mehgna (1973), Ora 11 Jon (1972), Suprovat, Guerrilla (2011) to name a few. In 2020, she was awarded "Bulbul Ahmed Award" by Bulbul Ahmed Foundation Trust.

== Early life ==
Mirana Zaman was born on 25 December 1936.

== Career ==
Mirana Zaman started her career in Bangladesh Betar as a voice artist and anchor. She later forayed in acting as well. Mirana started her film career in Jahan Baje Shehnai (1968). Then she went on to appear in 17 films. Her popular films include Ora Egaro Jon (1972), Dhire Bohe Meghna (1973), Guerrilla (2011) etc. Her last film appearance was in Shikhondi Kotha (2013).

She appeared in several television dramas telecast in Bangladesh Television. Among them Babar Binocular and Uttar Dakkhin are notable. In both of the dramas, she shared the screen with Dolly Zahur.
