= Aainaate =

- Film poster
- Directed by: Dulal Dey
- Screenplay by: Dulal Dey
- Story by: Dulal Dey
- Produced by: Narender S. Surana
- Starring: Rituparna Sengupta; Ferdous Ahmed; Rati Agnihotri; Soumitra Chatterjee; Deepankar De; Pushpita Mukherjee
- Music by: Joydeb Sen
- Release date: 28 November 2008
- Country: India
- Language: Bengali

Aainaate (Bengali: আয়নাতে, lit. 'In the Mirror') is a 2008 Bengali drama film directed by Dulal Dey. The film features Rituparna Sengupta, Firdous Ahmed, and marks Rati Agnihotri's debut in Bengali cinema.

== Plot ==
The film centers on Malini (Rituparna Sengupta), who reflects on her childhood and family connections while grappling with the trauma of molestation she experienced during her teenage years. Now a skilled photographer working for a magazine, Malini captures the poignant expressions of deceased individuals, exploring the emotions of their pale, lifeless faces. Her professional journey intersects with Urmila Sanyal (Rati Agnihotri), a prominent social activist dedicated to helping exploited and distressed women.

As Malini's life progresses, she embarks on a romantic relationship with Rajat (Firdous Ahmed), a wealthy businessman’s son. Torn between family expectations and her desire to maintain her own identity, Malini's situation becomes more complicated. Despite her family's support for her relationship with Rajat, they are unwilling to face the consequences when Malini becomes pregnant. Confronted with societal rejection and immense pressure to conform to patriarchal norms, Malini discovers unsettling truths about the people she once revered. Ultimately, she learns about the illegitimacy of her own birth and finds solace in Urmila Sanyal, whom she sees as a surrogate mother who had previously feared social condemnation.

== Cast ==
- Rituparna Sengupta as Malini
- Ferdous Ahmed as Rajat
- Rati Agnihotri as Urmila Sanyal
- Soumitra Chatterjee as Boren Sanyal
- Deepankar De as Mama
- Pushpita Mukherjee as Khuku

== Soundtrack ==
The film's music was composed by Joydeb Sen.

1. "Roj Shata Shata Mukh" – Kavita Krishnamurthy
2. "Swapno Rangano (Duet)" – Kumar Sanu
3. "Tumi Dekhale" (part 1) – Sadhana Sargam
4. "Jani E Lagan" – Kumar Sanu
5. "Premer Chhowa" – Ritika Sahani, Soham
6. "Swapno Rangano (Male)" – Kumar Sanu
7. "Tumi Dekhale" (part 2) – Sadhana Sargam
8. "Swapno Rangano (Female) – Alka Yagnik
