= Kokhono Megh Kokhono Brishti =

- VCD Cover
- Directed by: Moushumi
- Written by: Rabeya Khatun
- Produced by: Faridur Reza Sagar
- Starring: Moushumi; Ferdous; Razzak; Bobita; Humayun Faridi; Shahidul Alam Sachchu
- Cinematography: Shahidullah Dulal
- Edited by: Amzad Hossain
- Music by: Alauddin Ali
- Distributed by: Impress Telefilm Ltd.
- Release date: 2003
- Running time: 138 minutes
- Country: Bangladesh
- Language: Bengali

Kokhono Megh Kokhono Brishti (Bengali: কখনো মেঘ কখনো বৃষ্টি) is a 2003 Bangladeshi film directed by actress Moushumi. It was the first film she directed. It stars Moushumi, Ferdous, Razzak, Bobita, Humayun Faridi and Shahidul Alam Sachchu. Shooting wrapped up in August 2003.

== Cast ==
- Moushumi as Nodi
- Ferdous as Shabon
- Razzak as Nodi's brother
- Bobita as Nodi's sister-in-law (brother's wife)
- Humayun Faridi
- Shahidul Alam Sachchu
- Shabon
- Jasmin Parvez
- Shawon
- Shabon
- Priyanka
- Rawshan Ara
- Pranab Ghosh as himself
- Sibli Sadique
- Samsuddin
- Togor
- Shilpi Chokrobarti
- C B Jamal
- Tushar

== Music ==
Kokhono Megh Kokhono Brishti film's music directed by Bangladeshi famous music director Imon Shaha. Lyrics were by Gazi Mazharul Anwar and Mushfiqur Rahman Guljar. Playback singers were Bashir Ahmed, Andrew Kishore, Kanak Chapa, Pappia Sarowar, Sadi Mohammad, Samina Chowdhury and Sabbir Chowdhury. The film has six melodious songs with good scenes shot in Bangladesh.
