= Shahin Alam =

Bangladeshi film actor (1962–2021)

- Born: Shahinur Alam Shahin; 6 December 1962; Dhaka, Bangladesh
- Died: March 8, 2021 (aged 58)
- Occupation: actor
- Years active: 1993–2021
- Notable work: see below

Shahinur Alam Shahin (stage name Shahin Alam; 6 December 1962 – 8 March 2021) was a Bangladeshi actor who has appeared in films like Hathat Brishti (1998), Ghater Majhi (1998), Mastaner Upor Mastan (2002) etc.

== Career ==
Shahin Alam started his career with theatre plays and then he was selected in Bangladesh Fresh Face Talent Hunt organised by BFDC in 1986. His debut film was Mayer Kanna (1986) His films include Ghaater Majhi, Ek Palke, Gariber Sansar, Teji, Chandabaj, Prem Pratishodh, Tiger, Rag-Anurag, Daagi Sontan, Bagha-Baghini, Alif Laila, Dream Hero, Anjuman, Unknown Enemy, Traitor, Prem Diwana, My Mother, Crazy Babul, Hothat Brishti, Fight for Power, Dalpati, Sinful Child, Dhakaiya Mastan, Big Boss, Father, Baby Tiger, Rebel Salauddin and Fresh Men. He was a martial artist and earned a black belt. He has appeared in over 150 films, most of them as supporting actors.

== Filmography ==
- Boyfriend Number One (2013)
- Son of the doorman (2011)
- War on Life (2009)
- Torture (2006)
- Criminal Children (2006)
- King of the Capital (2006)
- Brother Number One (2006)
- Mature Player (2006)
- Ora Agnikanya (2006)
- Instruction (2006)
- Dawn of Bengal (2006)
- Top terrorist arrested (2006)
- Hira Amar Naam (2006)
- Ghrina (2006)
- Somajke Bodle Dao (2005)
- Hypocritical Leader (2004)
- Bagher Bachcha (2004)
- Bigg Boss (2003)
- Top Somrat (2003)
- Mastaner Upor Mastan (2002)
- Major Saheb (2002)
- Lund Bhand (2000)
- Hothat Brishti (1999)
- Shopner Nayok (1997)
- Bashira (1997)
- Prem Diwana (1993)
- Mayer Kanna (1986)

== Death ==
Alam was suffering from damaged kidneys and he was admitted to hospital on 13 July 2020. After fighting illness for 8 months in the hospital, Alam died on 8 March 2021 at the age of 58.
