= Tak Jhal Mishti =

Tak Jhal Mishti টক ঝাল মিষ্টি
- DVD cover of Movie Tak Jhal Mishti
- Directed by: Basu Chatterjee
- Starring: Ferdous Ahmed; Priyanka Trivedi; Arjun Chakraborty
- Release date: 5 September 2002
- Running time: 153 minutes
- Country: India
- Language: Bengali

Tak Jhal Mishti is a 2002 Bengali romantic movie directed by Basu Chatterjee. It stars Ferdous Ahmed and Priyanka Trivedi in the lead roles.

== Cast ==
- Ferdous Ahmed
- Priyanka Trivedi
- Arjun Chakraborty
- Ramaprasad Banik
- Ratna Ghoshal
- Sonali Chakraborty
- Kharaj Mukherjee
- Ananya Chatterjee
- Moumita Chakraborty
- Mousumi Saha

== Crew ==
- Director Basu Chatterjee
- Music Director Tabun Sutradhar
