= Kusum Kusum Prem =

Bangladeshi film

- Directed by: Mushfiqur Rahman Gulzar
- Written by: Mushfiqur Rahman Gulzar
- Produced by: Faridur Reza Sagar; Ibn Hasan Khan (Impress Telefilm Limited)
- Starring: Moushumi; Ferdous; Riaz; ATM Shamsuzzaman; Probir Mitra; Amol Bose; Nasima Khan
- Cinematography: Majibul Haque Bhiyan
- Edited by: Shohidul Haque
- Music by: Emon Saha
- Distributed by: Impress Telefilm Limited
- Release date: 31 August 2011
- Country: Bangladesh
- Language: Bengali

Kusum Kusum Prem (Bengali: কুসুম কুসুম প্রেম) is a Bangladeshi Bengali language film. It was released in 2011. The film was directed by Mushfiqur Rahman Gulzar who also wrote the story. The film was produced by Impress Telefilm Limited. Film stars Moushumi, Ferdous and Riaz in lead roles along with ATM Shamsuzzaman, Prabir Mitra, Khaleda Akter Kalpana, Amol Bose and Nasima Khan.

== Plot ==
Kusum Kusum Prem portrays the life of a destitute woman named Kusum.

== Cast ==
- Moushumi - Kusum
- Ferdous - Hashem
- Riaz - Badol
- ATM Shamsuzzaman - Guno Munsi
- Prabir Mitra - Kashem
- Kaleda Akter Kalpana - Badal's Mother
- Amol Bose - Gunin
- Nasima Khan - Kashem's Wife

== Music ==
The film's songs were composed and directed by Emon Saha. The playback singers are Kanak Chapa, Andrew Kishore, Monir Khan, Polash and Selim Chowdhury.

1. "Bhalobasha Dao" - Subir Nandi, Samina Chowdhury
2. "Buker Majhe Pushechilam" - Monir Khan
3. "Ei Prithibi" - Monir Khan
4. "Tor Alta Ranga Paye" - Monir Khan, Kanak Chapa

== Accolades ==
National Film Awards (for the year 2011)

- Won. Best actor: Ferdous
- Won. Best composer: Emon Saha
