= Alpha (2019 film) =

2019 Bangladeshi fantasy crime drama film

- Poster of Alpha
- Directed by: Nasiruddin Yousuff
- Written by: Nasiruddin Yousuff
- Screenplay by: Nasiruddin Yousuff
- Produced by: Faridur Reza Sagar; Esha Yousuff
- Starring: Alamgir Kabir; Doyel Mash; Al-Mamun Al Siyam; ATM Shamsuzzaman
- Edited by: Catherine Masud
- Production company: Impress Telefilms
- Release date: 26 April 2019
- Country: Bangladesh
- Language: Bangla

Alpha (Bengali: আলফা) is a 2019 Bangladeshi fantasy crime drama film starring Alamgir Kabir, Doyel Mash and ATM Shamsuzzaman in lead roles. It is the third direction of Nasiruddin Yousuff. The film was released on 26 April 2019. It was the submission of Bangladesh to the 92nd Academy Awards for the Academy Award for Best Foreign Language Film, but was not nominated.

== Synopsis ==
The film tells the story of a rickshaw painter, Alpha. He saw disharmony of the society and had to struggle with the condition of a concrete jungle.

== Cast ==
- Alamgir Kabir as Alpha
- Al-Mamun Al Siyam as Sarfaraz
- Doyel Mash as Golenur
- ATM Shamsuzzaman as Gondho Jetha
- Heera Chowdhury as Hekmat
- Ishrat Nishat as Solaiman's mother
- Vaskor Rasha as Alpha's father

== Release ==
The film was premiered on 20 April 2019 in Bangladesh Film Archive, and it was released in theatres on 26 April 2019.

== See also ==
- List of submissions to the 92nd Academy Awards for Best International Feature Film
- List of Bangladeshi submissions for the Academy Award for Best International Feature Film
