= Sohanur Rahman Sohan =

Bangladeshi film director and screenwriter (1960–2023)

- সোহানুর রহমান সোহান
- Born: 1960; Bogra District, East Pakistan, Pakistan
- Died: 13 September 2023 (aged 62–63); Dhaka, Bangladesh
- Occupations: Screenwriter; director
- Years active: 1988–2023
- Notable work: Keyamot Theke Keyamot; Ananta Bhalobasha
- Awards: Bachsas Awards

Sohanur Rahman Sohan (1960 – 13 September 2023) was a Bangladeshi film director and screenwriter, who was best known as the first director of Bangladeshi superstars Shakib Khan. He started his film career as an assistant of director Shibli Sadik. His first film was Biswas Abiswas (1988). He was best known in Dhallywood for directing romantic films. He launched Salman Shah and Moushumi with the film Keyamat Theke Keyamat in 1993 and his Ananta Bhalobasha in 1999 marked a turning point in Bangladeshi cinema by introducing Shakib Khan, who is now one of the biggest superstars in the industry. Other notable films directed by him are Amar Jaan Amar Pran (2008), Poran Jai Jolia Re (2010), Se Amar Mon Kereche (2012) etc. He served as the principal of the Universal Performing Arts Institute.

== Career ==
"Shakib (Khan) was brought to my attention by choreographer Aziz Reza, who first showed me his still photographs and strongly recommended him. At his insistence, I asked to meet the boy in person, and Aziz brought him to our office. We liked him as soon as we saw him. Shakib had the potential to become a leading man, and it was because I saw that potential in him that I cast him in the film. He may have been recommended, and I may have given him the opportunity, but the fact is that he was deserving."

— Sohanoor Rahman Sohan about launching Shakib Khan.

Sohanur Rahman Sohan born on October 15, 1960, in Fulbari, Bogra District then part of the East Pakistan and (now Bangladesh). Pursued his academic journey at Joypurhat School and College.

Commencing his cinematic expedition in 1977, Sohan served as an assistant director under the director Shibli Sadik. His apprenticeship extended to pivot roles in notable productions such as Shahidul Haque Khan's Kalmilata (1981), A J Mintu's Ashanti (1986) and Shibli Sadik's Wet Eyes (1988). He began his solo journey with the film Biswas Obiswas in 1988. He reached the pinnacle of his directorial finesse, attaining legendary status with the triumph of Keyamat Theke Keyamat (1993) with big screen debutant Salman Shah and Moushumi, which is a remake of the Indian cult Hindi film Qayamat Se Qayamat Tak (1989) starring Aamir Khan and Juhi Chawla. In 1999, he directed romantic masterpiece Ananta Bhalobasha, which marked a turning point in Bangladeshi cinema as the on-screen debut of Shakib Khan, who is now one of the biggest superstars in the industry and Erin Zaman, the younger sister of actress Moushumi. Despite the films humble reception, Shakib Khan as a hero caught the attention of everyone highlighting Sohan's keen eye for emerging talent in the industry.

== Death ==
On 12 September 2023, Sohan's wife died at their residence. A day after, Sohan also died at Crescent Hospital in Dhaka after suffering a stroke. He was 62. They survived three daughters, one of their daughter Samia Rahman Sristi found dead at a residential hotel in Dhaka in April 2024, aged 34. The middle daughter, Sadia Rahman Drishti is a Fashion Designer by profession. The youngest daughter is studying engineering abroad.

== Selected filmography ==
1. Biswas Abiswas (1988)
2. Love (1991)
3. Benam Badsha (1992)
4. Keyamat Theke Keyamat (1993)
5. Akheri Rasta (1994)
6. Bidrohi Konna (1996)
7. Shojon (1996)
8. Amar Ghor Amar Behesht (1997)
9. Amar Desh Amar Prem (1998)
10. Maa Jokhon Bicharok (1998)
11. Amar Protigga
12. Ananta Bhalobasha (1999)
13. Killer (2000)
14. Sotter Bijoy (2003)
15. Swami Chintai (2004)
16. Bolo Na Bhalobashi (2005)
17. Brishti Bheja Akash (2007)
18. Kotha Dao Sathi Hobe (2007)
19. Amar Jaan Amar Pran (2008)
20. Poran Jai Joliya Re (2010)
21. Koti Takar Prem (2011)
22. The Speed (2012)
23. Se Amar Mon Kereche (2012)
24. Ek Mon Ek Pran (2012)
25. Lobhe Paap, Paape Mrittu (2014)
26. Bhalo Lagar Cheyeo Ektu Beshi
27. Jedi (2022)
