= Lawrence Apu Rosario =

Bangladeshi cinematographer

L Apu Rosario
- Occupation: Cinematographer
- Organization: Bangladesh Short Film Forum
- Known for: Amar Bondhu Rashed
- Awards: National Film Award

Lawrence Apu Rosario is a Bangladeshi cinematographer. He won the Best Cinematographer category at the 2011 National Film Awards for the film Amar Bondhu Rashed.

== Education ==
Apu Rosario completed his higher secondary education at Notre Dame College, Dhaka in 1990. He later obtained an MSc degree in botany from University of Dhaka. He then studied motion picture photography at the Film and Television Institute of India, Pune.

== Films ==
- Matrity (2004)
- Khelaghor (2006)
- Durottwo (2004)
- Amar Bondhu Rashed (2011)
- Nekabborer Mohaproyan (2014)
- Anil Bagchir Ekdin (2015)
- We (2018)
- Ural (2020)

== Awards and honors ==
Award	Year	Category	Film	Result	Source
National Film Award	2011	Best Cinematographer	Amar Bondhu Rashed	Won	
BACHSAS Awards	2011	Best Cinematographer	Amar Bondhu Rashed	Won	
FFTG Awards	2020	Best Cinematographer	We	Won	
