= Shimul Yousuf =

Bangladesh actress and singer

- শিমুল ইউসুফ
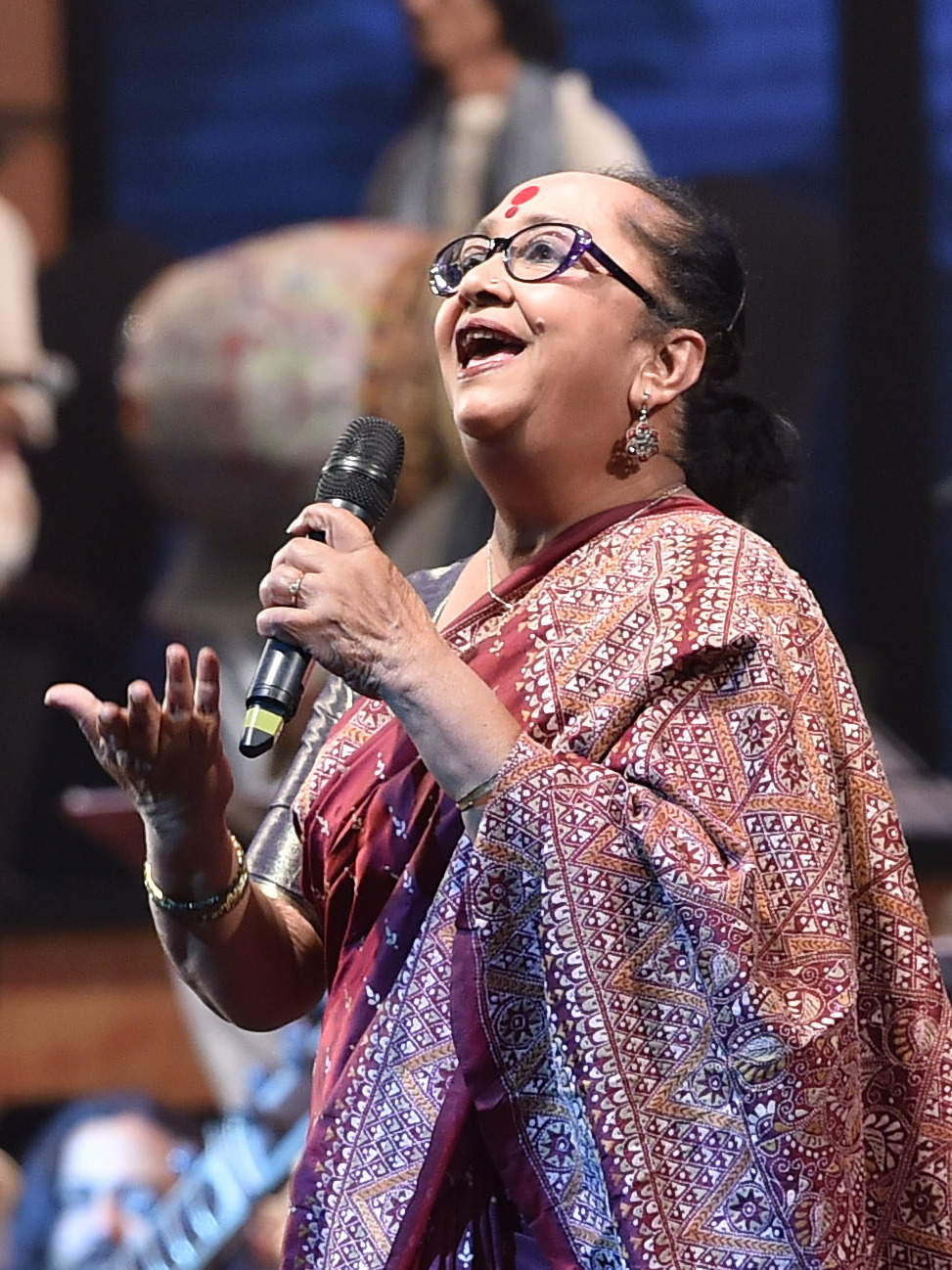
- Yousuf performing at the birth centenary program of Sheikh Mujibur Rahman in 2021
- Born: 24 March 1957 (age 68); Dhaka, East Pakistan, Pakistan
- Occupations: Actress, singer
- Spouse: Nasiruddin Yousuff
- Children: Esha Yousuff
- Parent: Mehter Billah
- Relatives: Minu Haque (sister)
- Awards: See full list

Shimul Yousuf (born 24 March 1957) is a Bangladeshi actress, director, and singer. In 2023, she was awarded the Ekushey Padak, the second highest award for civilians in Bangladesh.

== Early life ==
Yousuf was born in Dhaka on 24 March 1957 and is the youngest of seven siblings. Odissi dancer Minu Haque is her sister. Her father Mehter Billah from Bikrampur was a singer in Kamlapur. Shimul started singing at the age of five. She performed on radio and television and went on to sing in a children's show named "Kochi Kanchar Mela". She trained in classical and traditional songs from Ustad Helaluddin, P C Gomez, Altaf Mahmud, and Abdul Latif . Shimul completed her Honours in Social Science. She was admitted to the Institute of Fine Arts and also went to Baroda School of Fine Arts for schooling.

== Career ==
Yousuf first appeared in theater in one of the Abdullah Al Mamun's plays to raise funds for the freedom fighters in 1972. In 1974 she incorporated her in Dhaka Theatre after her siblings asked to be a proxy for another actress. Shimul began to take acting seriously after her 1975 drama "Muntasir Fantasy". She worked on Kasai (1976), Char Khakra (1977), Shakuntala (1978), Phani Monosa (1980), Kitton Khola (1981), Keramot Mongol (1985), Hat Hadai (1989), and Chaka (1990). During the 1990s she performed in Joiboti Kannyar Mon (1995) and Bono Pangshul (1998).

=== Binodini ===
One of her works in theater is the drama Binodini, based on a 19th-century actress Binodini Dasi. It is a one-person show where Yousuf portrayed the character of Binodini and also delivered the speeches of the remaining characters. The play was written by script writer Saymon Zakaria and directed by Shimul's husband, Nasiruddin Yousuff. The play mainly perpetuated the life of Binodini Dasi as she struggled to prolong her career in theater. Shimul said that "[the drama] shows the reality, the conflicts and contradiction an actress faces today, has not changed much since Binodini's time. Obviously I am affected by such realities."

== Awards ==
- Munier Choudhury Award (2024)
- Ekushey Padak (2023)
- Bangladesh National Film Award for Best Costume Design (2009)
- Bachsas Award for Best Music Director (2009)
- Bachsas Award for Best Female Playback Singer (2009)
- Anannya Top Ten Awards (2003)
- Zakaria Memorial Award (1999)
- Diboshri Padak
- Lokonatto Padak
- Aronno Dipu Padak
- Rishi Padak
- Rudra Padak
- Md. Shahidullah Award
- Jahangir Award
- Prothom Alo Jorip Award
- Women's Day Special Award
