= Amar Bondhu Rashed =

- DVD cover
- Bengali: আমার বন্ধু রাশেদ
- Directed by: Morshedul Islam
- Screenplay by: Morshedul Islam; Barkat Ullah Maruf
- Based on: Amar Bondhu Rashed by Muhammad Zafar Iqbal
- Produced by: Faridur Reza Sagar
- Starring: Chowdhury Zawata Afnan; Rayan Ibtesham Chowdhury; Refayat Zinnat; Faiyaz Bin Zia
- Cinematography: L. Apu Rozario
- Edited by: Ratan Paul
- Music by: Emon Saha
- Production companies: Monon Chalachitra; Impress Telefilm
- Distributed by: Ashirbad Chalachitra
- Release date: 1 April 2011
- Country: Bangladesh
- Language: Bengali

Amar Bondhu Rashed (Bengali: আমার বন্ধু রাশেদ, romanized: Amaar Bondhu Rashed, lit. 'My friend Rashed') is a film directed by Morshedul Islam, known for making indie movies. Adapted from the novel of same name Amar Bondhu Rashed by Muhammad Zafar Iqbal, the story narrates the courageous actions by schoolboy Rashed, told from the perspective of his friend Ibu, during the Bangladesh Liberation war in 1971. The movie was released on 1 April 2011. The music was composed and directed by Rizvi Hasan.

It is considered as one of the most critically acclaimed films of Bangladesh.

== Plot ==
The story is from the perspective a boy named Ibu during Bangladesh Liberation War in 1971. The story is about his friend Rashed. He lives in a small town. The character Rashed suddenly appears at his school. The name Rashed Hasan, was given to him by his teacher on his second day at school because his name real name 'Laddu' is not considered as an appropriate name and he did not have any other name. In 1971, when other students were not conscious about the liberation movement Rashed could understand the matters. Rashed started to motivate others to make them understand those matters. One day, Pakistani army attacks the town and Rashed observes the battle. He and his friends start to help the Mukti Bahini. In the end Ibu and his family evacuated the country, and Rashed was killed after getting caught by the Pakistani military.

== Cast ==
- Chowdhury Zawata Afnan as Rashed Hassan/Laddoo (deceased)
- Rayaan Ittesham Chowdhury as younger Ibu/Rakibul Hasan
- Rizvi Hasan
- Refayat Zinnat as Fazlu
- Faiyaz Bin Zia as Asraf
- Shovon Jaman
- Likhon Rahi as Dilip
- Kaosar Abedin as Kader
- Arman Parvez Murad as Shafiq
- Humaira Himu as Aru
- Raisul Islam Asad as senior Ibu/Rakibul Hasan
- Kazi Rayhan Rabbi as Ibu's son Rashed (named after his childhood friend Rashed)
- Pijush Banerjee as Ibu's father
- Wahida Mollick Jolly as Ibu's mother
- Inamul Huque as Majid Sir
- Gazi Rakayet as Ajraf Ali
- Kamol Ghosh as Dilip's father
- Kholilur Rahman Kadery as doctor
- Md Jakir Hossain (Actor) as Freedom Fighters
- Habibur Rahman as Freedom Fighter
- Shahinur Rahman as Freedom Fighter

== Production ==
Amar Bondhu Rashed was based on the novel of the same name by professor Muhammad Zafar Iqbal and was adapted by Filmmaker Morshedul Islam. This is the second collaboration between Zafar Iqbal and Morshedul Islam following Dipu Number 2. It was jointly produced by Monon Chalachitra and Impress Telefilm Ltd and was partially funded by a grant from the Government of Bangladesh. Ashirbad Chalachitra was the distributor of the film.

== Release ==
Amar Bondhu Rashed was released on 1 April 2011 in Dhaka, Khulna, Rajshahi, and Dinajpur in Bangladesh. The premier of the movie was held in Star Cineplex in Dhaka. The Pabna District Police and Pathshala, a non-profit organization, jointly organized the screening of the movie in 30 schools and colleges in the district. The movie was screened at Shahjalal University of Science and Technology where the writer of the book, Muhammad Zafar Iqbal, is a faculty member. On 23 May 2011, it was screened in Manikganj District. On 16 July 2011, the movie was screened at Rajshahi University. The movie was screened at the 7th annual South Asian Film Festival in 2012. It was screened at the 6th International Children's Film Festival, organized by the Children's Film Society of Bangladesh, in Khulna in 2013. The movie was screened at a film festival organized by the Theatre and Film Department of Bangladesh Shilpakala Academy in 2013.

=== Reception ===
Tamana Khan wrote in her review for The Daily Star that it was a "commendable effort to bring something entertaining for children but one that could have been done with a little more finesse". She praised the attempt but felt the adaption did not develop the relationship between the characters by leaving out some of the scenes from the book. The Daily Star placed it on a list of "essential Bangla movies for children" list in 2015 and on a list of 5 "memorable films" on the Bangladesh Liberation war in 2017.

== See also ==
- Dipu Number Two
