= Projapoti: The Mysterious Bird =

- Theatrical release poster
- Directed by: Mohammad Mostafa Kamal Raz
- Written by: Mohammad Mostafa Kamal Raz
- Produced by: Enayetur Rahman Bappy; NTV Production House
- Starring: Zahid Hasan; Moushumi; Mosharraf Karim
- Cinematography: Khair Khandakar
- Edited by: M. Jahangir Hossain and Md. Farhad Ahmed
- Music by: Habib Wahid
- Production company: NTV Production House
- Distributed by: NTV Production House
- Release date: 7 November 2011
- Running time: 113 minutes
- Country: Bangladesh
- Language: Bengali

Projapoti: The Mysterious Bird is a Bangladeshi film which was released in 2011. This film was directed by director of television Mohammad Mostafa Kamal Raz and it was his first film. This film was produced by Enayetur Rahman Bappy, under the banner of NTV Production House. Main star cast of the film was Moushumi, Zahid Hasan, Mosharraf Karim.

== Story ==
Tanvir (Zahid Hasan) is a gambler who never wins, so his family relies on his wife's income. His wife, Rita (Moushumi), borrowed money from her relatives for his business, but he lost it all gambling. Tareq (Mosharraf Karim) is a wealthy but lonely man who has a cousin named Babar who works for him. One day, Tareq meets Tanvir in a park, where he is playing imaginary cards alone because he has no money.

Tareq lends Tanvir money to gamble with and watches him play. As the story progresses, Tanvir borrows thousands of pounds from Tareq. One day, Tareq refuses to lend him any more money, even though Tanvir has a good hand and is about to win. Tanvir offers his wife as collateral to Tareq in order to borrow more money. However, Tanvir loses the bet, leaving Rita heartbroken when she finds out. She leaves Tanvir's house and moves in with Tareq. While the lovesick Tanvir waits outside Tareq's house, hoping Rita will forgive him, Tareq tries to win her over. Rita neither forgives Tanvir nor accepts Tareq's love. Ultimately, she leaves Tareq's house without informing anyone and becomes a teacher in a remote village.

== Cast ==
- Zahid Hasan - Tanveer
- Moushumi - Rita
- Mosharraf Karim - Tareq
- Sohel Khan - Mahfuz
- Kochi Khondokar -
- Kamal Hossain Babor - Babor

== Soundtrack ==
Projapoti

Soundtrack album by Habib Wahid
- Released: 2 September 2010
- Genre: Dhallywood Soundtrack
- Label: G-Series
- Producer: G-Series

The songs of this film were composed by Habib Wahid under the banner of G-Series. Lyrics were penned by Kabir Bakul, Shafiq Tuhin and Zahid Akbar.

Song	Singer	Lyricist	Music director
Projapoti (Title Song)	Habib and Konaa		Habib Wahid
Doob	Habib Wahid		Habib Wahid
Choto Golpo	Kumar Biswajit		Habib Wahid
Du Dikei Boshobash	Nancy		Habib Wahid
Taka	Ferdous Wahid and Shithi Saha		Habib Wahid
Prottakkhan	Balam		Habib Wahid
Choto Shwopno (Slow)	Kumar Biswajit		Habib Wahid

== Awards and nominations ==
Award	Category	Artist(s)	Result
National Film Awards	Best Music Director	Habib Wahid	Won
National Film Awards	Best Lyricist	Sahfiq Tuhin	Won
National Film Awards	Best Singer (Female)	Nancy	Won
Meril Prothom Alo Awards	Best Actress	Moushumi	Won

== See also ==
List of Bangladeshi films of 2011
