= Erin Zaman =

Bangladeshi actress

- ইরিন জামান
- Born: Sonadanga Khulna, Bangladesh
- Occupations: Actress, singer, television anchor
- Years active: 1999–2014
- Known for: Ananta Bhalobasha (1999)

Erin Zaman is a Bangladeshi actress, singer, and television anchor. She became notable as the first heroin of veteran Bangladeshi actor-producer Shakib Khan.

== Biography ==
Erin Zaman is Moushumi's younger sister. She made her debut in Dhallywood with Ananta Bhalobasha in 1999, where Shakib Khan was her co-star, which was also the first on-screen appearance of Shakib Khan. She acted in television dramas too. In 2008, she also performed with Khan in Monowar Khokon's romance project Hridoy Amar Naam.

Her first album was Modhurat, which was released before Ananta Bhalobasha. In 2008, her second album, Tomay Dekhbo Chhuye, was released, and in 2014, her third album, Chaile Tumi, was released. She also worked as a television host. She is now living in Atlanta in the United States.

== Selected filmography ==
- Ananta Bhalobasha as Jyoti (1999)
- Meher Negar (2005)
- Dojjal Shashuri
- Ulta Palta 69 (2007)
- Hridoy Amar Naam (2008)
- Shreshtho Sontan (2008)

== Album list ==
- Modhurat
- Tomay Dekhbo Chhuye
- Chaile Tumi
