= Hothat Brishti =

1998 Bengali romance movie directed by Basu Chatterjee

- DVD cover of the film
- Directed by: Basu Chatterjee
- Written by: S. Ahathian
- Story by: Agathiyan
- Produced by: Gramco Films (India); Ashirbad Chalachchitra (Bangladesh)
- Starring: Ferdous Ahmed; Priyanka Trivedi; Sreelekha Mitra
- Cinematography: Shirsha Roy
- Edited by: Satish Patnakar
- Music by: Nachiketa Chakraborty; Lyrics; Hindi Song Ruka Ja; Sanjeev Tiwari
- Release date: 1998
- Running time: 150 minutes
- Country: India
- Language: Bengali

Hothat Brishti (transl. Sudden Rain) is an Indian Bengali-language romance film released in 1998 under the direction of Basu Chatterjee. It is a remake of the 1996 Tamil film Kadhal Kottai. It was produced by both Bangladesh and India and featured Ferdous Ahmed, Priyanka Trivedi and Sreelekha Mitra.

== Plot ==
Deepa Nandy (Priyanka Trivedi) lives in Taramati with her sister and brother in law Premendra (Raisul Islam Asad). Tired of being a burden on her relatives, Deepa goes to Kolkata to look for a job. She stays with her friend Aruna. Despite appearing at a number of interviews, she does not manage to get a job and decides to go back to Taramati. On her way back, a pickpocket snatches her bag from the train window. This bag contained all her certificates. The co-passengers chip in to pay for her ticket and she manages to reach home. Her brother-in-law makes a sarcastic remark on seeing her back.

Meanwhile, Ajit Choudhury (Ferdous Ahmed) boards the train to go to Jaisalmer. Incidentally the pickpocket had thrown Deepa's bag into the train after taking the money. Ajit finds the bag. During Ajit's discussions with a co-passenger we come to know that Ajit is an orphan. He has a curious hobby of collecting people's names and birthdays and sending them birthday cards.

Ajit arrives at Jaisalmer and meets Haradhan Kundu or Kundu Singh (Manoj Mitra). Kundu Singh's grandfather had come from Dhaka and set up a hotel. However, the business floundered and Kundu's job became to help visitors get hotels etc. Kundu Singh arranges a room for Ajit. Here Ajit meets Rupmati, who lives next door.

Ajit sends Deepa's bag with the certificates to her. Deepa is overjoyed and sends back a thank you note. This exchange of letters continues and Ajit and Deepa fall in love with each other. Meanwhile, Rupmati (June Malia) is infatuated with Ajit and tries to learn Bengali phrases from Kundu Singh to impress Ajit. But when Kundu Singh tells Rupmati about Ajit's postal affair with Deepa, Rupmati is infuriated and confronts Ajit.

Ajit calls up Deepa every Sunday and Deepa send a T-shirt to Ajit so that she can recognize Ajit. Meanwhile, Deepa gets another interview call. Her brother in law Premendra arranges for the money to go to Kolkata and tells Deepa's sister that he will be glad if Deepa gets a job and has already identified a match for her. Over in Jaisalmer, Ajit is asked by the company MD to take new responsibility in factory to manage union troubles. Union leaders threaten Ajit. Ajit tries to quit job and go back to Kolkata. The company gives him a transfer instead to Kolkata. Rupmati asks for his forgiveness before Ajit leaves for Kolkata.

Ajit bumps into Deepa (literally) at the train station but they don't recognize each other. Deepa harbours a dislike for Ajit and tries to avoid him even though they meet accidentally. Preeti (Sreelekha Mitra) is the daughter of the MD of Ajit's company. Preeti flirts with Ajit. Ajit discourages Preeti and spurns her advances. Preeti gets a job in Singapore but does not want to leave Kolkata. Deepa goes back to Taramati. A letter from Deepa for Ajit gets into the hands of Preeti.

Ajit is not able to get a job and decides to drive a taxi in the meantime. Deepa's brother-in-law brings a marriage proposal for Deepa. Deepa meets the proposed candidate and tells him about Ajit. Deepa goes to Kolkata to look for Ajit. She goes to look for Aruna but Aruna wasn't home. Deepa gets into Ajit's taxi to go to Ajit's former office but still does not recognize him. Preeti gives Deepa the address of Ajit's former colleague and roommate. Deepa goes to meet Ajit's former colleague, who happens to be Prabodh (Shahin Alam), who had once proposed to Deepa. Prabodh (Kunal) reassures Deepa that he will try to find Ajit.

Deepa gets drenched in rain and goes in Ajit's taxi to his friend's house. Ajit gives Deepa the sari he had bought for her without knowing her identity. As AJit was drenched too, he wears the T-shirt Deepa had sent him but covers it with a shawl. Deepa goes back to Aruna's house but she had not returned. So Deepa decides to go back to Taramati.

Deepa's friend gets into the taxi of Ajit's friend. They come to know that their friends Ajit and Deepa love each other. Aruna gets the letter from Deepa and decides to go to the station to meet Deepa. Just as the train is leaving, Ajit removes his shawl and Deepa recognizes the T-shirt. She runs into Ajit's arms as the credits roll.

== Cast ==
- Ferdous Ahmed as Ajith Choudhury
- Priyanka Trivedi as Deepa Nandy
- Sreelekha Mitra as Preety
- Tota Roy Chowdhury as Basab
- Raisul Islam Asad as Premendra Nandy
- Manoj Mitra as Kundu Singh
- Shahin Alam as Sourabh
- June Malia as Rupamati
- Amol Bose as Telephone shop owner

== Soundtrack ==
- Lyrics and Music: Nachiketa Chakraborty
- Hindi Song: Sanjeev Tiwari
- Singer: Nachiketa Chakraborty, Saoli Mitra, Shikha Bose, Swastika Mitra

== Critical reception ==
Hothat Brishti was a success both in India and Bangladesh. This movie raised the leading Bangladeshi film star Ferdous Ahmed to stardom.
