= Bangladesh Short Film Forum =

Bangladeshi film organization

- Formation: August 1986
- Type: Organization of independent filmmakers
- Location: 108, Aziz Super Market, Shahbagh, Dhaka-1000, Bangladesh
- Official language: Bengali, English
- President: Zahirul Islam Kochi
- Key people: L. Apu Rozario (vice president); Dewan Shamsur Rakib (vice president); Rakibul Hasan (general secretary)
- Website: www.isiff-bd.org

Bangladesh Short Film Forum (BSFF) is an organization of young Bangladeshi film makers. It was formed on 24 August 1986 by a group of young independent filmmakers and activists who were then campaigning for creative and aesthetically rich cinema.

Most of these young filmmakers were initiated into cinema through their involvement with the film society movement in Bangladesh that began as early as in the 1960s. Short Film Forum was formed at a time when mainstream Bangladeshi cinema was dominated by crass commercialism and a network of producers-distributors-exhibitors which allowed no space for artistic or socially responsible films.

The Forum featured some of most notable young Bangladeshi film makers among its members, including Morshedul Islam, Tanvir Mokammel, Tareque Masud, Enayet Karim Babul, Tareq Shahrier, Shameem Akhter, Manjare Hasin Murad, Yasmin Kabir, Nurul Alam Atique, Zakir Hossain Raju, Zahidur Rahim Anjan, Rashed Chowdhury, Akram Khan, and Nasir Uddin Yusuf.

Bangladesh Short Film Forum now has its own film center in Shahbag, Dhaka with an auditorium, a library, an archive and an administrative office.

The Forum is mostly noted for organizing the biennial and non-competitive International Short and Independent Film Festival. The first festival was held in 1988, and was the first festival in the Indian Sub-continent which was entirely dedicated to short films.

The Forum produced a number of short films, including One Day in Krishnanagar (53 minutes) and Dhaka 2005 (5 minutes). It organizes seminars and workshops on films and limited scale film festivals all over Bangladesh, as well as film shows in its Bangladesh Film Center in Shahbag.

== Sources ==
- The festival on Bangladesh Online
- The festival on New Age
- The Forum on Power of Culture Website
- Weekly Holiday: Death of a creative mind
- Weekly Holiday: Open film open expression
