= Moushumi =

Bangladeshi actress and film director

- মৌসুমী
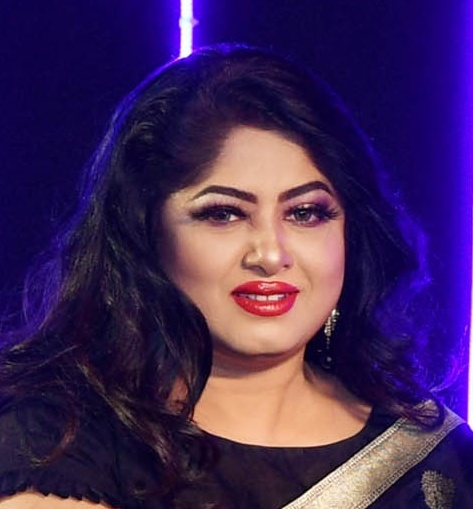
- Moushumi in 2021
- Born: Arifa Pervin Zaman; 3 November 1973 (age 52); Tailkupi, Khulna District, (Now Patkelghata, Satkhira District) Bangladesh
- Occupations: Actress, model, director
- Years active: 1992–present
- Notable work: Meghla Akash, Devdas
- Spouse: Omor Sani
- Children: 2
- Relatives: Erin Zaman (sister); Sadika Parvin Popy (cousin)

Arifa Pervin Zaman (born 3 November 1973), known by her stage name Moushumi, is a Bangladeshi film actress and director.

She is primarily known as a film actress and director through her work during the 1990s and 2000s. Her first film, Keyamat Theke Keyamat, released in 1993. Since then she has been in movies such as Ontare Ontare, Dola, Sneho, Bishwo Premik, Goriber Rani, 20 Bochor Por, Swajan, Denmohor, Adorer Sontan, Khuda, Sukher Ghore Dukher Agun, Muktir Songram, Bidrohi Bodhu, Luttoraj, Priyo Shotru, Kosto, Ondho Bhalobasha, Ulka, Rongin Rangbazz, Ruposhi Rajkonna, and Meher Nigar.

In the 2000s, her career rose further with films such as Matritto, Dojjal Shashuri, Khairun Sundori, Kokhono Megh Kokhono Brishti, Ammajan, Molla Barir Bou, Meghla Akash (2001), Shotru Shotru Khela, Tui Jodi Amar Hoiti Re, Sonar Moyna Pakhi, Kukkhato Khuni, Baba Amar Baba, and Golapi Ekhon Bilatey. These movies continued her success amid her reducing her work time after 2009 and becoming a supporting actor through films such as Taarkata, Dui Purush, Chittagainga Powa Noakhailla Maiya, Ek Cup Cha, Kichhu Asha Kichhu Bhalobasha, Ami Neta Hobo, and Shaheb Namer Golam.

She won the Bangladesh National Film Award for Best Actress three times for her roles in Meghla Akash (2001), Devdas (2013), and Taarkata (2014). She has acted in over 265 films and made her directorial debut with Kokhono Megh Kokhono Brishti (2003).

== Early life ==
Arifa Parvin Zaman was born on 3 November 1973. Tailkupi village, where she was born, was then in undivided Khulna District. (Now it is in Sarulia Union, Tala Upazila, Satkhira District). Her mother was Shamima Khatun. Her father was Nazmuzzaman Biswas, who worked as a contractor for the Khulna Development Authority. She had two younger sisters, Erin Zaman and Snigdha Zaman. She grew up in Sonadanga Thana of Khulna.

== Career ==
Moushumi won the Anonda Bichittra Photo Beauty Contest in 1990, which led to appearances in television commercials. She made her acting debut in 1993 with the movie Keyamat Theke Keyamat, a remake of a Bollywood film Qayamat Se Qayamat Tak directed by Sohanur Rahman Sohan. The film achieved significant commercial success in Bangladesh and shot Moushumi and her co-star Salman Shah to stardom. In the following two years she co-starred with Shah in three more feature films Ontare Ontare, Denmohor and Sneho.

In 1997, Moushumi started a production house, Kopotakhsma Cholochitra.

Moushumi founded Moushumi Welfare Foundation for women and children welfare and was named a UNICEF goodwill ambassador in 2013.

== Personal life ==
In 1996, Moushumi took a break for six months from acting and announced her engagement to actor Omar Sani. The couple have two children. Moushumi has a younger sister, Erin Zaman.

Actress Sadika Parvin Popy is Moushumi's cousin.

=== Legal issues ===
In August 2024, a Dhaka court issued an arrest warrant against Moushumi in an insufficient funds check case involving IPDC Finance. The warrant was issued after Moushumi had missed to appear in the court after multiple summonses.

== Filmography ==
=== Actress ===
Year	Title	Role	Notes	Ref.
1993	Keyamat Theke Keyamat	Reshmi	Debut film	
1993	Moushumi	Moushumi		
1994	Dola			
1994	Bidrohi Bodhu			
1994	Ontare Ontare	Jhinuk		
1994	Prothom Prem			
1994	Atmo Ohongkar			
1994	Sneho	Tithi		
1995	Denmohor	Rukhsana Chowdhury		
1995	Khuda			
1995	Vangchur			
1995	Muktir Songram			
1995	Songsharer Sukh Dukkho			
1995	Bishwo Premik	Shikha		
1995	Adorer Sontan			
1995	Shesh Rokkha			
1995	Priyo Tumi			
1995	Lojja			
1995	Goriber Rani			
1995	Atmo Tyag			
1995	Harano Prem			
1995	Shesh Khela			
1995	Baper Taka			
1996	Rakkhosh			
1996	Swajan			
1996	Sukher Swargo			
1996	Soitan Mansuh			
1997	Shanti Chai			
1997	Judge Shaheb			
1997	Ruposhi Rajkonna			
1997	Golaguli			
1997	Mithya Ohongkar			
1997	Rongin Rangbazz			
1997	20 Bochor Por			
1997	Laat Shaheber Meye			
1997	Sneher Badhon			
1997	Kal Naginir Prem			
1997	Kotha Dao			
1997	Ondho Bhalobasha			
1997	Sukher Ghore Dukher Agun			
1997	Monafek			
1997	Nara Pisach			
1997	Luttoraj			
1997	Ghaat Protighaat			
1997	Priyo Shotru			
1997	Tumi Shundor			
1998	Bagher Bachcha			
1998	Ulka			
1998	Vondo Baba			
1998	Sukher Ashay			
1998	Nor Pishach			
1998	Raja Bangladeshi			
1999	Moger Mulluk			
1999	Mostafa Bhai			
1999	Dushmon Duniya			
1999	Ammajan	Rina		
1999	Rajar Bhai Badsha			
2000	Cheater Number One			
2000	Aaj Gaye Holud			
2000	Kosto			
2000	Amar Protigya			
2000	Kukkhato Khuni			
2001	Meghla Akash		Won: Bangladesh National Film Awards	
2001	Bipodjonok			
2002	Dhakaiya Mastan			
2002	Major Saheb			
2002	Ali Baba			
2002	Itihas			
2002	Lal Doriya			
2002	Strir Morjada			
2002	Uttejito			
	Sotter Bijoy			
	Bouer Somman			
2003	Kokhono Megh Kokhono Brishti	Nodi	Debut as director	
2003	Big Boss			
2003	Bir Soinik	Rubi		
2004	Matritto			
2004	Khairun Sundori			
2005	Molla Barir Bou	Bokul	Won: Meril Prothom Alo Awards	
2005	Meher Nigar			
2006	Bindur Chele			
2006	Mayer Morjada			
2006	Hridoyer Kotha		Special appearance	
2007	Ek Buk Jwala			
2007	Ekjon Songe Chilo	Sumona		
2007	Shotru Shotru Khela			
2007	Machine Man			
2007	Shajghor			
2008	Swapnopuron			
2008	Tui Jodi Aamar Hoiti Re			
2008	Baba Amar Baba			
2008	Bodhu Boron			
2009	Shaheb Namer Golam			
2010	Golapi Ekhon Bilatey		Won: Meril Prothom Alo Awards	
2011	Kusum Kusum Prem	Kusum		
2011	Projapoti		Won: Meril Prothom Alo Awards	
2011	Dui Purush			
2013	Devdas	Chandramukhi	Won: Bangladesh National Film Awards, Nominated: Meril Prothom Alo Awards	
2014	Ek Cup Cha	Deepa	Won: Meril Prothom Alo Awards	
2014	Taarkata	Ibrahim's elder sister		
2015	Aashiqui	Arpita	Indo-Bangladesh Joint production	
2017	Dulabhai Zindabad	Josna		
2018	Postmaster 71			
TBA	Jam†		Filming	
TBA	Amar Baba		Post production, funded by Bengal Film Development Forum	
TBA	Bhangon			
TBA	Deshantor			

=== Director ===
- Kokhono Megh Kokhono Brishti (2003)
- Meher Negar (2006) jointly with Gulzar
- Shunno Hridoy (2014)

== Television appearances ==
=== Drama ===
Year	Title	Playwright & Director	Co-stars	Aired on	Notes & Source
2012	To be or not to be	Partho Sarker			Eid-ul-Fitr special TV play
2012	Otopor Ek Cup Cha	Partho Sarker	Shajal Noor		Eid-ul-Adha special one-hour play
2012	Kajoler Ontordhan	Kabir Bakul; Nuzhat Alvi Ahmed			Eid-ul-Adha special TV play
2015	"Shunno Jibon"			Channel i	first acted TV serial

=== TV program ===
- Judge of the TV competition "Super Hero Super Heroine", aired on ntv
- Judge of the reality show "Power Voice", aired on Channel 9
- Talk Show "Ekdin Sharadin" with Ferdous Ahmed, aired on Channel i on Eid-ul-Fitr in 2015

== Awards ==
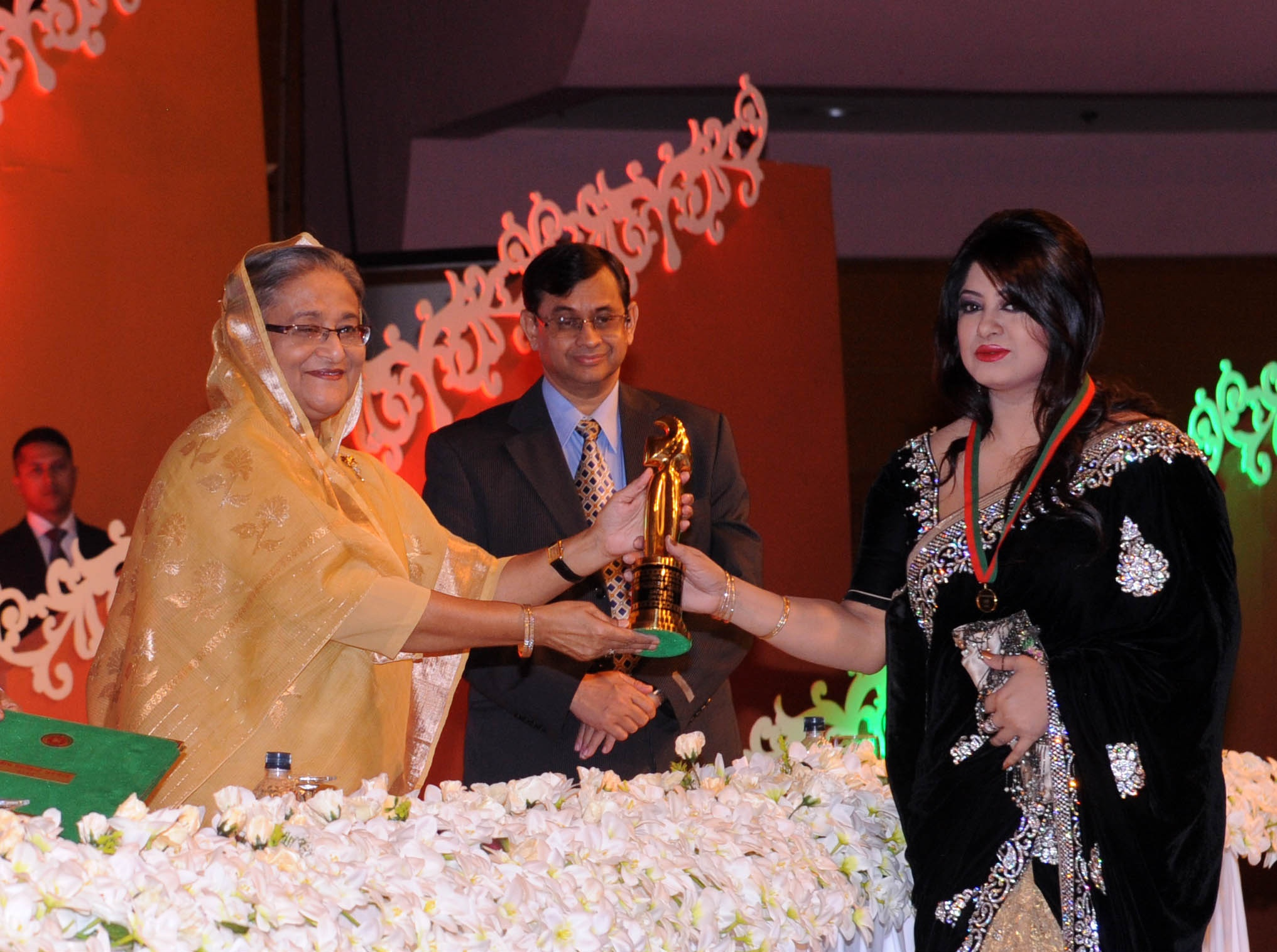
Moushumi receives National Film Award from Sheikh Hasina in 2015.

Year	Award Title	Category	Film	Result
2001	Bangladesh National Film Awards	Best Actress	Meghla Akash	Won
2005	Meril Prothom Alo Awards	Best Film Actress (Public Choice)	Molla Barir Bou	Nominated
2010	Meril Prothom Alo Awards	Best Film Actress (Public Choice)	Golapi Ekhon Bilatey	Won
2011	Meril Prothom Alo Awards	Best Film Actress (Public Choice)	Projapoti	Won
2011	Meril Prothom Alo Awards	Best Film Actress (Critics' Choice)	Projapoti	Nominated
2013	Bangladesh National Film Awards	Best Actress	Devdas	Won
2013	Meril Prothom Alo Awards	Best Film Actress (Public Choice)	Devdas	Nominated
2014	Bangladesh National Film Awards	Best Actress	Taarkata	Won
2014	Meril Prothom Alo Awards	Best Film Actress (Critics' Choice)	Ek Cup Cha	Won
2014	Meril Prothom Alo Awards	Best Film Actress (Public Choice)	Ek Cup Cha	Nominated
