= Guerrilla (2011 film) =

- Theatrical release poster
- Directed by: Nasiruddin Yousuff
- Screenplay by: Ebadur Rahman, Nasiruddin Yousuff
- Based on: The novel by Syed Shamsul Huq
- Produced by: Esha Yousuff
- Starring: Jaya Ahsan; Ferdous Ahmed; Shampa Reza; Ahmed Rubel; Shatabdi Wadud; Mirana Zaman; Pijush Bandyopadhyay; A.T.M. Shamsuzzaman
- Cinematography: Samiran Dutt
- Edited by: Sameer Ahmed
- Music by: Shimul Yousuf
- Production company: Impress Telefilm
- Distributed by: Ashirbad Cholochchita
- Release date: 14 April 2011
- Running time: 140 minutes
- Country: Bangladesh
- Language: Bengali

Guerrilla (Bengali: গেরিলা) is a 2011 Bangladeshi historical drama film based on the events of the Bangladesh Liberation War. It is an adaptation of the novel Nishiddho Loban by Syed Shamsul Huq and was released on 14 April 2011. It has been envisioned by the director of the film Nasiruddin Yousuf Bachchu. He has crafted the film Guerrilla with his own experience as a freedom fighter of 1971.

== Plot ==
On the ominous night of 25 March 1971, a heinous military operation, the Operation Searchlight, designed to kill indiscriminately the innocent democracy loving millions, was initiated by the Pakistan Army. The hated operation was just the beginning of the worst genocide to follow, a brutal crime against humanity after the Second World War. On that very night, Hasan Ahmed, a veteran journalist of the country, husband of Bilkis (Joya Ahsan), simply vanished while on his way to his newspaper office to perform his journalistic duty. He is untraceable till date.

Bilkis was in a banking profession. She started a desperate search for her husband and at the same time got herself engaged as a collaborator to the guerrilla operations which were gradually gaining momentum. She was not affected by her personal loss and pain, rather, undaunted; she chose the hazardous path to carry on the fight for our liberation. With the guerrilla fighters like Shahadat, Alam, Maya, Kazi Kamal, Fateh Ali and others operating in Dhaka, she started participating directly in many dangerous and successful operations. She was in constant touch with Altaf Mahmud, the legendary personality of Bengali Nation's musical arena and scorer of many revolutionary songs. She thus became the central character in the movie, also a target to the enemy. Bilkis, Shahin and many others got involved in the publication of a secret English News bulletin The GUERRILLA, obviously from the underground. Incidentally, at a particular point of time, Taslim Ali Sardar, a traditional Chieftain of the old Dhaka's subsector (Moholla), who courageously sheltered ill-fated Bilkis, got brutally killed by the Pakistani Army and their lackeys--- the hated rajakars. At one point, Altaf Mahmud, Rumi, Bodi along with some other freedom fighters were captured. Altaf and few others like him did never return, could never be traced, a tragic fact well known to us today. Bilkis, a lonely character now, could evade the worse, and tactfully leave the labyrinth- like barriers and traps set by the occupational army around Dhaka. She could get into a train to her home, Joleswari, a remote village at Rangpur. The metallic train transforms into a character, a symbolic one, a moving replica designed to depict a catastrophic journey.

The parents of Bilkis were killed in the communal riots of January '71 earlier. She just was desperately longing to meet her own brother: Khokon at Joleswari. Khokon was then a commander of the local freedom fighters. Pakistan Army units were on the verge of collapse due to consistent fierce attacks initiated by those fighters. Khokon dynamited a vital railway bridge near Joleswari, interrupting all train movements. She had to reach her brother. Nothing could deter her. She opted to walk. On her way, she got a young vibrant male companion, Siraj, a member of Khokon's fighting group. At one point Khokon was captured by the Pakistan Army. The brutal Army and Rajakar predators slaughtered him along with other captured freedom fighters. Bilkis wanted to have a glimpse of her dead brother, wanted to touch his apparently cold, inert body to feel the warmth of a loving brother, the heat of the fire inside him which no killer could extinguish. Khokon was a living, pulsating symbol of our ongoing freedom fight. She, risking her life, could enter the 'killing fields' of the occupants but was captured immediately by them. Bilkis was captured but she did never surrender to the heinous forces. For her country, for the entire freedom loving humanity, she did set up an example, a glorious one. She does not allow her body, the body of the fledgling Bangladesh, to be molested by the vultures of Pakistan. She blew herself up with explosives, destroying the surrounding mocking dogs in the process.

== Cast ==
- Jaya Ahsan as Bilkish Banu
- Ferdous Ahmed as Hasan Ahmed
- Pijush Bandyopaddhay as Anwar Hossain
- Ahmed Rubel as Altaf Mahmud
- Shatabdi Wadud as Captain Shamsad / Major Sarfaraj
- Shampa Reza as Mrs. Khan
- Apurbo Mozumdar as Colonel Taj Khan
- Azad Abul Kalam as Tyeb
- Shajjad Ahmed as Siraj
- Mirana Zaman as Jahanara Begum
- ATM Shamsuzzaman as Taslim Sardar

== Production ==
=== Development ===
The production process of the film started from January 2010. State grants play a special role in this regard. Later, Impress Telefilms joined with Ariel Creative Space and made the production more dynamic. Director Nasir Uddin Yusuf finalized the screenplay by revising it with Ebadur Rahman. With the help of character selector and producer Esha Yusuf, he decided the actors and actresses, talked to them about character-time, background-acting etc. Under his guidance, the costume department under the leadership of Shimul Yusuf and the art department under the leadership of Animesh Aich began to be prepared. As per the advice of the director, Military Training Adviser Lt Col (retd) Qazi Sajjad Ali Zaheer, Virpratik continued the training of Pak military. Action-explosion scenes were planned with Atiqur Rahman Chunnu. Finally, after many calculations like shooting schedule, FDC camera booking, Kodak film stock supply with Spark Limited, stay-eat, come-go, make-up, rain machine, crane, trolley, the actual construction work started in May with local and foreign talent.

=== Filming ===
Starting from 27 May 2010 sometimes Iskaton of Dhaka, Gulshan, Dhaka University, sometimes Tejgaon industrial area, Dhaka Medical College Morgue, Rajarbagh Police Line, again Panam Nagari of Sonargaon, Dhamrai, Rangpur here and there, Parvatipur of Dinajpur and again Dhamrai, Pubail, Manikganj The shooting ended on the morning of October 26 after exposing 180 cans of film for about 5 months at various locations.

However, editing began in the meantime, with Sameer in charge, at Gaon Productions Studios, with all negatives processed at Prasad Labs, Chennai, India. Telecine started coming from there in several stages, editing started here. Meanwhile, Syed Hasan Tipu's recording studio Dream-Desk was prepared for dubbing with various technical additions in consultation with Mumbai-based sound engineer Vinod Subramanian and dubbing started on 9 November 2010. In the meantime, talks are underway with Mumbai's Pixion for digital intermediates and Indranil Roy for visual special effects work. Along with this, Shimul Yusuf's atmospheric music work continues. Then as usual DI, special sound effects and visual effects etc. are completed and the celluloid print comes out from AdLab in Mumbai and the dream is created.

== Awards ==
=== National Film Awards ===
Guerrilla, won the 2011 National Film Awards highest award of the 10 categories.

- Best Film – Faridur Reza Sagar, Ibne Hasan and Esha Yusuf (producer)
- Best Director – Nasiruddin Yousuff
- Best Screenwriter – Ebadur Rahman, Nasiruddin Yousuff
- Best Dialogue – Ebadur Rahman, Nasiruddin Yousuff
- Best Actress – Joya Ahsan
- Best Villain – Shatabdi Wadud (jointly with Misha Sawdagar for Boss Number One)
- Best Editor – Sami Ahmed
- Best Art Director – Animesh Aich
- Best makeup man – Md. Ali Babul
- Best Clothing and decor – Shimul Yousuf

=== Meril Prothom Alo Awards ===
Guerilla received Awards in 4 categories for the Best Bangladeshi Film in the 2011 Meril Prothom Alo Awards.

- Best Film (Critics branch)
- Best Film Director Award (Nasir Uddin Yusuf)
- Best film artist (women) (Jaya Ahsan)
- Special Prize ATM Shamsuzzaman
- Best Child Actor Bidushi Bornita
