= Amol Bose =

Bangladeshi actor

- Born: Amol Bose; 1943; Faridpur, Bengal Presidency, British India
- Died: January 23, 2012 (aged 69); Dhaka, Bangladesh
- Occupations: Theater actor Film actor Television actor Radio actor
- Years active: 1966–2012
- Spouse: Sati Bose
- Children: Mondira Bose
- Parent(s): Ashalata Bose; Binod Behari Bose

Amal Bose (born Amalendu Bose (Bengali: অমল বোস); 1943 – 23 January 2012) was a Bangladeshi actor who appeared in theater, television and radio performances. He began his career in stage acting in 1963. His first film appearance was in Raja Sannasi (1966).

== Early and personal life ==
Bose was born in 1943 in Boalmari, Faridpur, Bangladesh. He started acting in the early 1960s in stage, film, television and radio. While a student of class seven, Bose first performed in a school play, which ignited his interest in acting. Later, he joined a professional Jatra troupe, 'Milon Shangha', in Boalmari, Faridpur. He spent the majority of his career in Dhaka.

He was married to Sati Bose. They have a daughter, Mandira Bose.

== Career ==
=== Theater ===
Bose began his career in theatre in Dhaka in 1963 as a theatre director and performer. The then Finance Minister of East Pakistan gave him a gold medal for his performance in a play. Plays directed by Bose were popular at home and abroad. Over 25,000 people saw the London productions of Siraj-ud-Daulah and Roopban, both Rangdhonu Natya Goshthi productions directed by Bose.

=== Film ===
Bose's first film role was in Raja Sanyashi in 1966. He has appeared in over 400 movies. He directed the film Keno Emon Hoy in the early 1960s. He appeared in the movies Abichar, Neel Akasher Nichey, Sonali Akash, Mohua, Phulshojja, Rangin Gunai Bibi, Chandra Dwiper Rajkonya, Rajlokkhi Srikanto, Hothat Brishti, Ami Shei Meye, Tomakey Chai, and Mon Maney Na. He won a National Film Awards (Bangladesh) for his work in the movie Aajker Protibad.

=== TV ===
Bose acted in a number of TV plays on the Bangladesh Television network starting in 1964. His regular skit "Nana-Nati" in the TV show Ittyadi was popular. He appeared in many TV dramas over his 38-year career.

He has also served as a senior officer of Jute Mills Corporation and retired in 1995.

== Notable films ==
- Raja Sannasi
- Neel Akasher Neechey
- Mohua
- Sonali Akash
- Chondon Diper Rajkonna
- Gunai Bibi
- Rajlokkhi Srikanto
- Abisar
- Ajker Protibad
- Ami Sei Meye
- Ajante
- Mon Mane Na
- Kajer Meye
- Ami Tomari
- Tumi Shudhu Tumi
- Sontan Jokhon Shotru
- Biyer Phool
- Tomar Jonno Pagol
- Milon Hobe Kotodine
- Khepa Basu
- Mon
- Bhalobasha Kare Koy
- Hothath Bristi
- Shoshurbari Zindabad
- Mayer Somman
- Wrong Number
- Akkel Alir Nirbachon (2008)
- Kusum Kusum Prem

== Awards ==
Bose won the National Film Awards for best co-artist' in the film Ajker Protibad, directed by Chashi Nazrul Islam.

== Death ==
Bose died of a heart attack at the age of 69 on 23 January 2012 in Apollo Hospitals, Dhaka.
