= Ferdous Ahmed =

Bangladeshi film actor, producer and politician

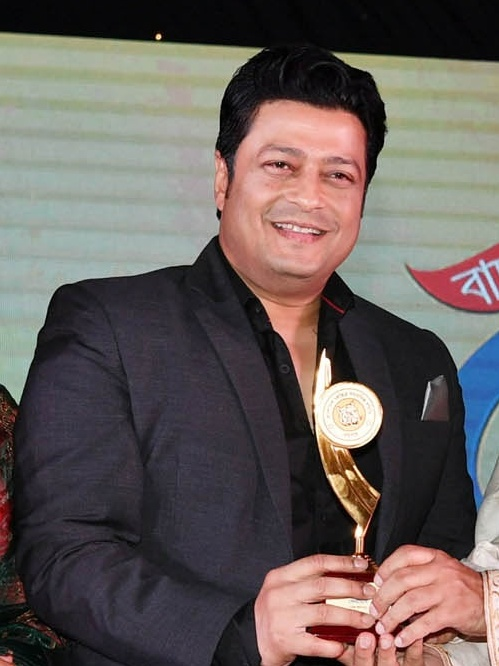
- Ahmed in 2019

Member of Parliament
- In office 29 January 2024 – 6 August 2024
- Preceded by: Shafiul Islam Mohiuddin
- Succeeded by: Shaikh Rabiul Alam
- Constituency: Dhaka-10

Personal details
- Born: 7 June 1972 (age 54) Comilla, Bangladesh
- Party: Bangladesh Awami League
- Spouse: Tania Ferdous (m. 2004)
- Children: 2
- Education: University of Dhaka; Adamjee Cantonment College
- Occupation: Actor, producer and politician
- Awards: Bangladesh National Film Awards (4 times)

Ferdous Ahmed (born 7 June 1972) is a Bangladeshi film actor, producer, and politician. He served as an MP representing the Dhaka-10 constituency.

His work includes Hothat Brishti (1998), Kokhono Megh Kokhono Brishti (2003), Chandrokotha (2003), Nondito Noroke (2006), Amar Swapna Tumi (2005), Moner Manush (2010), and Guerrilla (2011). He won the Bangladesh National Film Award for Best Actor five times for his roles in the films Hothat Brishti (1998), Gangajatra (2009), Kusum Kusum Prem (2011), Ek Cup Cha (2014), and Putro (2018).

In November 2023, Ahmed was nominated as Awami League's candidate for the Dhaka-10 constituency, replacing the incumbent Shafiul Islam Mohiuddin, in the 2024 Bangladeshi selection.

== Career ==
Ferdous Ahmed has become one of the highest-paid actors in Bangladesh. Ahmed was introduced to the film industry by choreographer Amir Hossain Babu. He debuted in the film Buker Vetor Agun. But Hothat Brishti (1998), directed by Basu Chatterjee, was Ahmed's first massive success. He won his first Bangladesh National Film Award for Best Actor for the lead role in the film. He then acted in two other Chatterjee films – Chupi Chupi (2001) and Tak Jhal Mishti (2002).

In 2002, he appeared in Azadi Hasanat Firoz's romance Sobar Upore Prem. In 2003, he performed in Chandrokotha and Kal Shokale. He appeared in Bachelor (2004) and in Meher Nigar (the first film made from the writing of national poet Kazi Nazrul Islam). In 2005, he performed in Rakkhushi. In 2006, Ahmed appeared in two films by Didarul Alam. The first was made from Humayun Ahmed's novel, Nondito Noroke, directed by Belal Ahmed.

Ferdous Ahmed owns a film production company, Nuzhat Films, the television production house CinemaScope, and a wing of an event planning studio. He produced his first film, Ek Cup Cha in 2014. which produced Postmaster 71.

== Personal life ==
Ferdous married Tania Ferdous, a pilot by profession, in 2004. Together they have two daughters, Nuzhat and Namira.

== Controversy ==
During the run-up to the 2019 Indian general election, Ahmed visited West Bengal, India, and was campaigning for chief minister and All India Trinamool Congress chief Mamata Banerjee. The Indian Union Ministry of Home Affairs revoked his business visa in turn.

In September 2024, a series of WhatsApp messages from a group named "Alo Ashbei" circulated online. The group, reportedly initiated by Ahmed and former state minister Mohammad Ali Arafat, included numerous pro-Awami League entertainers, politicians, and journalists. The leaked chats exposed members discussing strategies against the student-led anti-discrimination protests that took place in July 2024, which called for reform in the government job quota system and later evolved into a broader movement against the Awami League government and then-Prime Minister Sheikh Hasina.

The messages revealed in the chats, which included violent and provocative language, sparked outrage among netizens and within the entertainment industry. For instance, actress Aruna Biswas, another member of the group, suggested that they should "dump hot waters on the protesters", a comment she later clarified was misinterpreted.
