= Nasiruddin Yousuff =

Bangladeshi film director

- নাসির উদ্দীন ইউসুফ
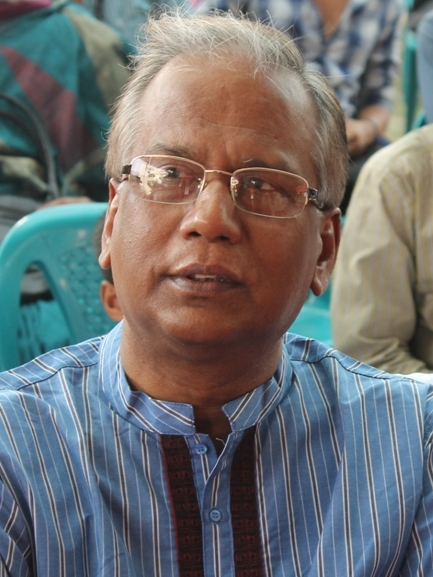
- Yousuff (April 2014)
- Born: April 15, 1950 (age 75); Lalbagh, Dhaka
- Occupations: Theater and film director
- Organization: Dhaka Theater
- Spouse: Shimul Yousuf

Nasiruddin Yousuff is a Bangladeshi stage and film director. He won Bangladesh National Film Award for Best Director for the film Guerrilla (2011). He was awarded Ekushey Padak by the Government of Bangladesh in 2010 for his contribution to Bangladeshi theater. He was a freedom fighter, an urban guerrilla fighter who fought for independence of Bangladesh.

== Career ==
Yousuff, along with Selim Al Deen, founded "Dhaka Theatre" in 1973 and later "Bangladesh Gram Theatre". He is the organising secretary of Bangladesh Centre of International Theatre (BCITI). He served as the president and director of the Committee for Cultural Identity and Development (CIDC).

== Works ==
- Ekattorer Jishu (1993)
- Alpha (2019)
- Guerrilla (2011)
- Shey Kotha Boley Jai

== Personal life ==
Nasiruddin Yousuff passed Matriculation from Old Dacca's Nawabpur Government High School in 1966. Yousuff is married to artist Shimul Yousuf. Together they have a daughter Esha Yousuf.
