= Shabana filmography =

Afroza Sultana Ratna (known by her stage name Shabana) is a Bangladeshi film actress. She earned a total of ten Bangladesh National Film Awards. Her national film award-winning roles were in Janani (1977), Sokhi Tumi Kar (1980), Dui Poisar Alta (1982), Nazma (1983), Bhat De (1984), Apeksha (1987), Ranga Bhabi (1989), Moroner Pore (1990) and Achena (1991). Across her three-decade-long career, she appeared in 299 films. She co-starred with Alamgir in 130 of them.

== Filmography ==
- All films are in Bengali-language, unless otherwise noted.

| Year | Film | Role | Note | Ref. |
|---|---|---|---|---|
| 1961 | Notun Sur | Ratna | Debut film as child artist; credited as Ratna | |
| 1963 | Talash | Herself | Debut in Urdu film as child artist; credited as Ratna | |
| 1964 | Paise | Herself | Urdu film as child artist; credited as Ratna | |
| 1965 | Sagar | Herself | Urdu film as child artist; credited as Ratna | |
| 1965 | Mala | Herself | Urdu film as child artist; credited as Ratna | |
| 1966 | Abar Bonobase Rupban | Sonavan | Supporting role; credited as Ratna | |
| 1966 | Daak Babu | Ratna | Supporting role; credited as Ratna | |
| 1966 | Bhaiya | Ratna | Urdu film as child artist; credited as Ratna | |
| 1967 | Chakori | Chakori | Debut in as lead role; Urdu film | |
| 1967 | Jongli Meye | | | |
| 1967 | Chote Saheb | | Urdu film | |
| 1968 | Chand Aur Chandni | | Urdu film | |
| 1968 | Bhagya Chakra | | | |
| 1968 | Kuli | | Urdu film | |
| 1969 | Daag | Shana | Urdu film | |
| 1969 | Anari | | Urdu film | |
| 1969 | Mukti | | | |
| 1970 | Payal | Paru | Urdu film; Bengali version as Nupur | |
| 1970 | Somapti | | | |
| 1970 | Chhoddobeshi | | | |
| 1970 | Bablu | | | |
| 1970 | Bijli | Bijli | | |
| 1970 | Modhu Milon | | Urdu version as Meherban released on 1971 in Pakistan | |
| 1970 | Ekoi Ange Eto Rup | | | |
| 1970 | Chand Suraj | Seema | Urdu film | |
| 1972 | Shomadhan | | | |
| 1972 | Chhondo Hariye Gelo | | | |
| 1972 | Ranga Bou | | | |
| 1972 | Erao Manush | | | |
| 1972 | Abujh Mon | Madhubi Banerjee | | |
| 1972 | Ora Egaro Jon | | | |
| 1972 | Swikriti | | | |
| 1972 | Chowdhury Bari | | | |
| 1973 | Jhorer Pakhi | | | |
| 1973 | Atithi | | | |
| 1973 | Bodhu Maata Konya | | | |
| 1973 | Dasyu Rani | | | |
| 1974 | Obak Prithibi | | | |
| 1974 | Dur Theke Kachhe | | | |
| 1974 | Bichar | | | |
| 1974 | Chokher Jole | | | |
| 1974 | Kar Hasi Ke Hase | | | |
| 1974 | Malka Banu | | | |
| 1974 | Daku Mansur | | | |
| 1974 | Adhare Alo | | | |
| 1974 | Utsorgo | | | |
| 1975 | Chashir Meye | | | |
| 1975 | Abhagi | | | |
| 1975 | Badshah | | | |
| 1975 | Alo Chhaya | | | |
| 1975 | Anek Prem Anek Jwala | | | |
| 1975 | Dui Rajkumar | | | |
| 1975 | Sadhu Shoytan | | | |
| 1975 | Sonar Khelna | | | |
| 1975 | Banjaran (Urdu) | | | |
| 1976 | Joy Porajoy | | | |
| 1976 | Agun | | | |
| 1976 | Gormil | | | |
| 1976 | Sondhikkhon | | | |
| 1976 | Jibon Sathi | | | |
| 1976 | Jibon Moron | | | |
| 1976 | Setu | | | |
| 1976 | Monihar | | | |
| 1976 | Raj Rani | | | |
| 1976 | Ferari | | | |
| 1976 | Jaliyat | | | |
| 1977 | Janani | | | |
| 1977 | Omor Prem | | | |
| 1977 | Jadur Banshi | | | |
| 1977 | Anubhab | | | |
| 1977 | Moner Manush | | | |
| 1977 | Dost Dushmon | | | |
| 1977 | Saheb Bibi Golam | | | |
| 1977 | Chakori | | | |
| 1977 | Daata Hatem Tai | | | |
| 1978 | Sohag | | | |
| 1978 | Angaar | | | |
| 1978 | Fakir Majnu Shah | | | |
| 1978 | Badhu Biday | | | |
| 1978 | Alangkar | | | |
| 1978 | Mayar Badhon | | | |
| 1978 | Toofan | | | |
| 1979 | Matir Ghar | | | |
| 1979 | Anurag | | | |
| 1979 | Ghar Sansar | | | |
| 1979 | Sonar Horin | | | |
| 1979 | Bijoyini Sonabhan | | | |
| 1980 | Sokhi Tumi Kar | | | |
| 1980 | Alif Laila | | | |
| 1980 | Chhokka Panja | | | |
| 1980 | Shesh Uttar | | | |
| 1980 | Chhutir Ghonta | | | |
| 1981 | Angshidar | | | |
| 1981 | Badal | | | |
| 1981 | Rajar Raja | | | |
| 1981 | Putra Badhu | | | |
| 1981 | Jhumka | | | |
| 1981 | Nawabzadi | | | |
| 1981 | Mohanogor | | | |
| 1981 | Gharani | | | |
| 1981 | Badhon Hara | | | |
| 1981 | Swami | | | |
| 1981 | Ostad Sagred | | | |
| 1981 | Kudrat | | | |
| 1981 | Bhangra Gora | | | |
| 1981 | Matir Putul | | | |
| 1981 | Allah Meherban | | | |
| 1982 | Rajnigandha | | | |
| 1982 | Dui Poisar Alta | | | |
| 1982 | Lal Kajol | | | |
| 1982 | Keu Karo Noy | | | |
| 1982 | Nalish | | | |
| 1982 | Ashar Alo | | | |
| 1982 | Sobuj Sathi | | | |
| 1982 | Alta Banu | | | |
| 1983 | Najma | | | |
| 1983 | Ghorer Bou | | | |
| 1983 | Lalu Bhulu | | | |
| 1983 | Mehoman | | | |
| 1983 | Somoy Kotha Bole | | | |
| 1984 | Bhat De | | | |
| 1984 | Sokhinar Juddho | | | |
| 1984 | Notun Prithibi | | | |
| 1984 | Nasib | | | |
| 1984 | Himmatwali | | | |
| 1984 | Basera | | Bilingual film | |
| 1984 | Mayer Achol | | | |
| 1985 | Ma O Chhele | | | |
| 1985 | Hulchul | | Multilingual film (Pakistani-Bangladeshi-Turkish) | |
| 1985 | Awara | | | |
| 1986 | Shatru | Asha | Bengali-Hindi bilingual film | |
| 1986 | Nishana | | | |
| 1986 | Ashanti | | | |
| 1986 | Chapa Dangar Bou | Kadambini | | |
| 1987 | Surrender | | | |
| 1987 | Didar | | | |
| 1987 | Rajlakshmi Srikanta | | | |
| 1987 | Apekkha | | | |
| 1987 | Desh Bidesh | | | |
| 1987 | Lalu Mastan | | | |
| 1987 | Shoshi Punno | | | |
| 1987 | Swami Stree | | | |
| 1987 | Sondhan | | | |
| 1988 | Stree | | | |
| 1988 | Amar | | | |
| 1988 | Shakkhor | Shanu | | |
| 1989 | Byathar Daan | | | |
| 1989 | Ranga Bhabi | | | |
| 1989 | Bidhata | | | |
| 1989 | Satya Mithya | | | |
| 1989 | Bhaijan | | | |
| 1990 | Moroner Pore | | | |
| 1990 | Goriber Bou | | | |
| 1990 | Bhai Bhai | | | |
| 1990 | Shadhin | Hena Chowdhury | | |
| 1990 | Mayer Dowa | | | |
| 1991 | Aandhi | | Bilingual film | |
| 1991 | Achena | | | |
| 1991 | Kajer Beti Rahima | | | |
| 1991 | Pita Mata Sontan | | | |
| 1991 | Streer Paona | | | |
| 1991 | Shantona | | | |
| 1991 | Top Rongbaz | | | |
| 1992 | Andha Biswas | | | |
| 1992 | Khoma | | | |
| 1992 | Lokkhir Shongshar | | | |
| 1993 | Abujh Sontan | | | |
| 1993 | Banglar Bodhu | | | |
| 1994 | Sneho | | | |
| 1994 | Ghatok | | | |
| 1994 | Grihobodhu | | | |
| 1994 | Dussahos | | | |
| 1994 | Kaliya | | | |
| 1994 | Judge Barrister | Barrister Shahana Chowdhury | | |
| 1995 | Konna Dan | | | |
| 1995 | Raag Anurag | | | |
| 1995 | Banglar Nayok | | | |
| 1995 | Ghorer Shotru | | | |
| 1996 | Ajante | | | |
| 1996 | Banglar Maa | | | |
| 1996 | Nirmom | | | |
| 1996 | Sotter Mrittu Nei | | | |
| 1996 | Morjadar Lorai | | | |
| 1996 | Miththar Mrittu | | | |
| 1996 | Durjoy | | | |
| 1996 | Gariber Sansar | | | |
| 1996 | Sukher Swargo | | | |
| 1997 | Ghore Ghore Juddho | | | |
| 1997 | Noropishach | | | |
| 1997 | Swami Keno Asami | | | |
| 1997 | Palabi Kothay | | | |
| 1998 | Meyerao Manush | | | |
| 1998 | Maa Jokhon Bicharok | Shanu | | |
| 1998 | Poradhin | | | |
| 1998 | Bhalobashar Ghor | | | |
| 1998 | Dui Rongbaz | | | |
| 1999 | Ekti Songsarer Golpo | | | |
| 1999 | Jiddi | | | |
| | Chakrani | | | |
| | Begum Rokeya | | | |
| | Jongli Phool | | | |

=== Other Bengali films ===
- Madhumita
- Man Somman
- Keu Karo Noy
- Usila
- Judge Barrister
- Shashon
- Banglar Badhu
- Bhabhir Sangshar
- Shamir Adesh
- Nanad Bhabi
- Jalim
- Bourani
- Iman
- Rajdulari
- Shashipunno
- Shiri Farhad
- Shabuj Shathi
- Shtree Hotta
- Ognishakhkhi
- Shobar upore maa
- Shakhi Tumi Kar
- Toposhsha
- Aashami
- Sukher Shorgo
- Sneher Badhon
- Nil Sagorer Tire
- Sotru Voyonkor
- Meiman
- Bondon
- Dui Rongbaz
- Griho Juddo
- Strir Shopno
- Ekti Shongshar Er Golpo
- Rag Anurag
- Akheri Mokabeli
- Swakhsmar
- Praischitto
- Shopno
- Hasan Tarek
- Somor
