= Premer Somadhi =

1996 Bangladeshi Bengali-language film

- Movie poster
- Directed by: Iftekhar Jahan
- Written by: Delwar Jahan Jhantu
- Screenplay by: Delwar Jahan Jhantu
- Story by: Delwar Jahan Jhantu
- Produced by: Ataur Rahman Tunu
- Starring: Bapparaj; Amit Hasan; Shabnaz; Antora; Dildar; A.T.M. Shamsuzzaman; Gangua
- Cinematography: Jakir Hossain
- Edited by: Dildar Hasan
- Music by: Anwar Jahan Nantu
- Production company: Bashundhara Films
- Distributed by: Bashundhara Films
- Release date: June 26, 1996
- Running time: 149 minutes
- Country: Bangladesh
- Language: Bengali

Premer Somadhi is a 1996 Bengali-language Bangladeshi romantic drama film. The story, screenplay, and dialogues were written by Delwar Jahan Jhantu and directed by Iftekhar Jahan. It was produced by Ataur Rahman Tunu under the banner of Bashundhara Films. It stars Bapparaj, Shabnaz, and Amit Hasan in the lead roles. It was remade in Indian Bengali-language Tollywood in 1997 as Bakul Priya.

The film, which was released in theaters on July 26, 1996, deals with themes of love, separation, relationships, and social conflict. The film was a huge box office success that year. The film's choreography was directed by Aziz Reza and the fight direction was also by Arman Group. The cinematographer was Zakir Hossain. Bapparaj gained a special recognition among the audience through the songs of the film and his role as a failed lover in the love triangle of the film, a type of role that the actor also had in films such as Prem Geet, Harano Prem, Bhulona Amay, Buk Bhora Bhalobasa, and Bhalobasa Kare Koy.

== Cast ==
- Bapparaj as Bakul
  - Srabon as Young Bakul
- Shabnaz as Ruksana Begum Hena
  - Baby Sheema as Young Hena
- Amit Hasan as Asif Khan
- Antora as Shayla
- Meena Hayder as Bakul's mother
- Dildar as Achar Mia
- A. T. M. Shamsuzzaman as Ramiz Mia
- Gangua as Joan
- Anwar Hossain as Khalek Mia

== Music ==
Premer Somadhi

Soundtrack album by Anwar Jahan Nantu
- Released: 1996
- Genre: film music
- Length: 41:21
- Label: Anupam Music
- Producer: Ataur Rahman Tunu

The music of the film Premer Samadhi was directed by Anwar Jahan Nantu. The most popular songs of this 16-reel, 14,694-foot film are 'Jibener Nookha Chole Hele Dule', 'Premer Somadhi Venghe', Tumi Bandhu Amar Chiro Sukheh Thako'. The songs were sung by Sabina Yasmin, Andrew Kishore, Shakila Zafar, Baby Naznin. The lyrics of the songs were written by Delwar Jahan Jhantu.

No.	Title	Lyrics	Singers	Length
1.	"Premer Somadhi Venge"	Delwar Jahan Jhantu	Andrew Kishore	6:06
2.	"Tumi Bondhu Amar"	Delwar Jahan Jhantu	Andrew Kishore	5:49
3.	"Jiboner Nouka Chole"	Delwar Jahan Jhantu	Sabina Yasmin, Andrew Kishore	4:30
4.	"Amare Ki Bhuila Gecho"	Delwar Jahan Jhantu	Sabina Yasmin	4:36
5.	"Mon Debo Hai Ami Jare"	Delwar Jahan Jhantu	Baby Naznin	6:18
6.	"Amar Moner Pakhir Chobi"	Delwar Jahan Jhantu	Shakila Zafar	4:22
7.	"Jiboner Nouka Chole"	Delwar Jahan Jhantu	Sabina Yasmin	4:28
8.	"Dekho Dekho Sundori"	Delwar Jahan Jhantu	Shakila Zafar, Anwar Jahan	5:58
Total length:				41:21

== Release ==
The film was released in Bangladeshi theaters on 26 July 1996.

== Reception ==
The film is said to have been a "huge commercial success": "The story of this film, the charming performances of the three stars and the songs were well received by the audience at that time. The songs of the film Premer Somadhi were played day and night in all corners of the country. Even though almost two decades have passed since the film's release, the songs of this film are still often heard on the lips of the audience". Contemporary audiences are still said to very often associate Bapparaj, Amit Hasan and Shabnaz with the film.

Prothom Alo stated that "The dialogue "Chacha, Hena Kothay?" (transl. Uncle, where is Hena?) is being widely discussed on social media in recent times. In the video clip of the recently viral film 'Premer Somadhi', it can be seen that, at one point in the movie, the protagonist Bakul (Bapparaj) returns home after a long time and finds his lover Hena (Shabnaz) decorating the house. He asks Hena's father, 'Uncle, why is the house so decorated? And where is hena? Uncle, don't talk about that. Why are you silent?' Uncle said in reply, 'Forget Hena, Hena is married.' Bakul then got emotional and said, 'No, no, Hena can't get married. I don't believe it, I don't believe it.' After that, the song "Premer Somadhi Venge, Moner Shikol Chhire, Pakhi Jai Ure Jai" started playing on the screen. Shariful Islam Nafi from Jamuna Television stated that "A video clip from the movie 'Premer Samadhi' is constantly trending on social media". RTV stated that "The movie 'Premer Somadhi' was released in 1996. At that time, the movie got a huge response from the audience. Actor Bapparaj and actress Shabnaz gained popularity at the same time". Dhaka Tribune stated that "The song from the movie "Premer Somadhi" with the lyrics "Premer Somadhi Venge, Moner Shikol Chhire, Pakhi Jai Ure Jai" has been on people's lips for 29 years. A search on YouTube shows that the song, uploaded six years ago by a channel called "Anupam Movie Songs", has been viewed more than 116.5 million times. And there are numerous comments praising the lyrics and singer of the song".
