= Bapparaj =

Bangladeshi actor (born 1963)

- বাপ্পারাজ
- Born: Rezaul Karim; 11 March 1963 (age 63); Dhaka Bangladesh
- Occupations: Actor, director, producer
- Years active: 1986–present
- Parent: Abdur Razzak (father)

Rezaul Karim (born 11 March 1963) known professionally as Bapparaj, is a Bangladeshi actor, producer, and director who predominantly worked in Dhallywood cinema. He was referred to in the media as "Tragedy King" due to his frequent and popular roles as a love failure or tragic hero in various films.

He made his debut in the Dhallywood industry with the film Chapa Dangar Bou (1986). Some of his the films that gave him popularity in his early stage of his career as lead actor include Dhaka 86, Jiner Badshah, Prem Shakti, Judge Barrister, Nishpap Bodhu, Banglar Commando, Ainer Haat, Bish Bochor Pore, & Bidrohi Bodhu. Some of his notable films as a second hero include Raag Anurag, Harano Prem, Premgeet, Gariber Sansar, Sakkhor, Ochol Poysa, Hotta, Ajker Sontrashi, Birdohi Asami, Tapossa, Chakrani, & Professor (1992).

== Early life ==
Bapparaj was born as Rezaul Karim on 11 March to Bangladeshi actor Abdur Razzak and Khayerun Nesa (Laxmi). He is the son of Bangladeshi cinema's legendary actor Nayak Raj Razzak. He is now busy with family business.

== Career ==
Bangladeshi film actor Bapparaj has acted in more than 100 films, with actresses such as Shabnur, Moushumi, Shabnaz, Lima, Sonia, Apu Biswas, and Purnima, and alongside other actors such as Riaz, Amit Hasan, Ferdous, Shakib Khan and Omar Sunny. His career starting in Dhallywood cinema in 1986 with film Chapadangar Bou, some of his hit films as a lead actor kept his prominence as a lead actor. These movies include Ma Jokhon Bicharok, Amar Ontore Tumi, Bissho Harami, Premer Nam Bedona, Mrithar Mrityu, Koto Je Apon, Sontan Jokhon Shotru, Moron Niye Khela, Premer Somadhi & Bhulona Amay. Some of his successful films as a supporting character in these times from 1995 to 2000 include Tejjo Putro, Buk Bhora Bhalobasha, Kotha Dao, Nirmom, Baba Keno Chakor, Tumi Je Amar, Paglir Prem, Durdanto Dapot, Baba Keno Asami, Bipod Songket, Baba Keno Asami, Parle Thekao, Taji Sontan, Andolon, Chiro Shotru.

After 2000, like many top actors of the time, he took a hiatus from film industry due to lack of interest in films as his consent to vulgarity, copies of Indian films, bad storytelling, and piracy. However he was still able to perform in supporting characters in successful films like Iblish, Jibon Shimante, Bhalobasha Kare Koy, Amar Shopno, & Koti Takar Fakir.

== Filmography ==
Key
†	Denotes films that have not yet been released

Year	Film	Role	Notes	Ref.
1986	Chapa Dangar Bou	Mahatap	Debut film	
1988	Dhaka 86	Sohan		
1988	Shakkhor	Pabla		
1989	Raja Mistri	Shamim		
1990	Jinner Badshah	Ratan Miah		
1990	Shadhin	Pavel		
1992	Professor	Khoka		
1992	Ajker Hangama	Rana		
1992	Dhongshon	Bappa		
1992	Shanti Oshanti	Inspector Rana		
1993	Prem Shakti	Raju		
1993	Prem Geet	Vicky		
1993	Jonom Dukhi	Ashik Ahmed		
1994	Judge Barrister	Srabon		
1994	Ainer Hat	Jibon		
1994	Hotta	Tonny		
1994	Dakat	Raju		
1994	Bidrohi Bodhu	Rahul		
1995	Chakrani	Rana		
1995	Boner Raja Tarzan	Rocky	Remake of the series Tarzan in Manhattan	
1995	Andolon	Inspector Sohel		
1995	Banglar Commando	Joy	Remake of the film Sholay	
1995	Hulia	Badshah		
1995	Rag Anurag	Mintu	Remake of the film The Parent Trap	
1996	Bidrohi Premik	Milon		
1996	Harano Prem	Maruf Khan		
1996	Topossha	Dipu		
1996	Baghini Konna	Opu		
1996	Ajker Sontrasi	Joy		
1996	Premer Somadhi	Bakul		
1996	Gariber Sansar	Sujon		
1996	Akheri Mokabela	Raju		
1996	Goriber Ostad	Rana		
1996	Nirmom	Prince		
1997	20 Bochor Por	Symon		
1997	Chiro Shotru	Rasel Raihan		
1997	Kotha Daw	Doctor Raihan		
1997	Baba Keno Chakor	Shamim Ahmed		
1997	Beimaner Shasti	Robin Chowdhury		
1997	Koto Je Apon	Ronny		
1998	Ochol Poisha	Munna		
1998	Nishpap Bodhu	Vicky		
1998	Mitthar Mrittu	Armaan		
1998	Protishruti	Rumi		
1998	Tejjo Putro	Sagor		
1998	Doronto Premik	Raja / Juwel		
1998	Paglir Prem	Raja		
1998	Bipod Songket	Inspector Joy		
1998	Ma Jokhon Bicharok	Kaliya		
1998	Amar Ontore Tumi	Agun		
1999	Ekti Shongsharer Golpo	Tomal		
1999	Bhulona Amay	Raju		
1999	Buk Vora Bhalobasha	Robin		
1999	Bissho Harami	Dipu		
1999	Dordanto Dapot	Sumon		
1999	Santan Jokhon Shatru	Dulal	Remake of 1985 Bangladeshi film Sot Bhai	
1999	Parle Thekao	Reza		
1999	Goribrao Manush			
2000	Baba Keno Ashami			
2000	Tumi Je Amar			
2000	Bidrohi Ashami			
2000	Teji Shontan			
2000	Sot Bhai		Debut in Indian Bengali film; remake of the 1985 Bangladeshi film Sot Bhai	
2000	Premer Naam Bedona	Raja	Remake of the 1983 Bangladeshi film Bodnam	
2001	Ghore Ghore Juddho	Sagor		
2001	Jabab Chai	Koushal Chakraborty	Indian Bengali film; remake of the 1985 Bangladeshi film Ashikar	
2001	Iblish		Remake of the film The 7th Voyage of Sinbad	
2001	Moron Niye Khela			
2002	Bhalobasha Kare Koy			
2002	Voyonkar Bodmash			
2005	Bhalobashar Juddho			
2005	Jibon Shimante			
2007	Moner Sathe Juddho		Won – Bachsas Awards for Best Supporting Actor; remake of the film Jeet	
2008	Koti Takar Fokir		Remake of the film Aankhen	
2009	Hridoy Theke Pawa		Remake of the film John Q.	
2009	O Sathi Re			
2009	Sobaito Bhalobasha Chay			
2010	Amar Shopno			
2011	Maa Amar Chokher Moni			
2012	Most Welcome			
2015	Kartooz		Also as director	
2017	Missed Call	Rana		
2017	Tukhor	Shihab		
2018	PoraMon 2	Norshed		
2023	Flashback 71	Major Akbar	Short film	
2026	Biday †	Chairman	Filming	
2026	Gulshan-er Chameli †	TBA	Filming	
TBA	Jibon Jontrona †	TBA	Completed	
TBA	Secret Agent †	TBA	Post-production	

=== Television ===
Year	Title	Role	Notes	Ref.
2004	Sritisotta	Ayon	Television drama on BTV	
2010	Gari	Raees	Telefilm; also director and story writer	
TBA	Rokto Rin †	Sayem Jabbar	First Web Series	

=== Other credits ===
Year	Title	Director	Producer	Notes	Ref.
2010	Gari	Yes	No	Telefilm; also story writer	
2014	Kacher Manush Rater Manush	Yes	No	Telefilm	
2014	Ekjon Lekhok	Yes	No	Telefilm	
2015	Kartooz	Yes	No	Debut film as director	
TBA	Tarchera †	Yes	Yes	Unreleased	

== See also ==
- Cinema of Bangladesh
