= Nirmom =

- YouTube version poster
- Directed by: Alamgir
- Screenplay by: Alamgir
- Story by: Delwar Jahan Jhantu
- Produced by: Lukman Hossain
- Starring: Alamgir; Shabana; Bapparaj; Shabnaz
- Cinematography: Afzal Chowdhury
- Edited by: Aminul Islam Mintu
- Music by: Alam Khan
- Production company: Akhi Films
- Distributed by: Akhi Films
- Release date: 1996
- Country: Bangladesh
- Language: Bengali

Nirmom is a 1996 Bengali language Bangladeshi drama film story written by Delwar Jahan Jhantu and screenplay, dialogue and direction by Alamgir. It stars Alamgir, Shabana, Bapparaj, Shabnaz in lead roles. Shabnaz won Bangladesh National Film Award for Best Actress for her role in the film.

== Cast ==
- Alamgir
- Shabana
- Bapparaj
- Shabnaz
- Dildar
- Morjina
- Jumbo

== Award ==
- Bangladesh National Film Award for Best Actress won Shabnaz
