= Mohammad Shoaib =

Mohammad Shoaib is the name of:

- Muhammad Shoaib (1907–1997), Pakistani finance minister
- Mohammad Shoaib (Constitutional Loya Jirga), delegate to Afghanistan's Constitutional Loya Jirga
- Mohammad Shoaib (Bangladeshi politician), politician from the Dinajpur District of Bangladesh
