= Dinajpur-5 =

Constituency of Bangladesh's Jatiya Sangsad

Coordinates: 25.66°N 88.91°E

- Constituency for the Jatiya Sangsad
- District: Dinajpur District
- Division: Rangpur Division
- Electorate: 477,516 (2026)

Current constituency
- Created: 1973
- Party: Independent
- Member: AZM Rezwanul Haque
- ← 9 Dinajpur-4 11 Dinajpur-6 →

Dinajpur-5 is a constituency represented in the Jatiya Sangsad (National Parliament) of Bangladesh since 2026 by independent politician AZM Rezwanul Haque.

== Boundaries ==
The constituency encompasses Fulbari and Parbatipur upazilas.

== History ==
The constituency was created for the first general elections in newly independent Bangladesh, held in 1973.

== Members of Parliament ==
Election	Member	Party
1973	Abdul Haque	Awami League
1979	Md. Shawkat Ali	Awami League
Major Boundary Changes
1986	Mostafizur Rahman Fizar	Awami League
1988	Mohammad Shoaib	Jatiya Party
1991	Mostafizur Rahman Fizar	Awami League
Feb 1996	AZM Rezwanul Haque	Bangladesh Nationalist Party
Jun 1996	Mostafizur Rahman Fizar	Awami League
2001	Mostafizur Rahman Fizar	Awami League
2008	Mostafizur Rahman Fizar	Awami League
2014	Mostafizur Rahman Fizar	Awami League
2018	Mostafizur Rahman Fizar	Awami League
2024	Mostafizur Rahman Fizar	Awami League
2026	AZM Rezwanul Haque	Independent

== Elections ==
=== Elections in the 2020s ===
General election 2026: Dinajpur-5
Party	Candidate	Votes	%	±%
Independent	AZM Rezwanul Haque	113,650		
NCP	Md. Abdul Ahad	108,948		
Majority		4,702		
Turnout				
Registered electors		477,516		
Independent gain from AL				

=== Elections in the 2010s ===
General Election 2014: Dinajpur-5
Party	Candidate	Votes	%	±%
AL	Mostafizur Rahman Fizar	93,576	96.7	+40.4
WPB	Mohammad Afsar Ali	3,224	3.3	N/A
Majority		90,352	93.3	+80.3
Turnout		96,800	27.2	−63.6
AL hold				

=== Elections in the 2000s ===
General Election 2008: Dinajpur-5
Party	Candidate	Votes	%	±%
AL	Mostafizur Rahman Fizar	164,419	56.3	+13.2
BNP	A. Z. M. Rezwanul Haque	126,529	43.3	+2.9
IAB	Md. Mostafizar Rahman	968	0.3	N/A
Majority		37,890	13.0	+10.4
Turnout		291,916	90.9	+6.5
AL hold				

General Election 2001: Dinajpur-5
Party	Candidate	Votes	%	±%
AL	Mostafizur Rahman Fizar	105,337	43.1	+2.8
BNP	A. Z. M. Rezwanul Haque	98,883	40.4	+16.3
IJOF	Mohammad Monsur Ali Sarkar	39,709	16.2	N/A
CPB	Md. Hafez Ali	296	0.1	N/A
Independent	Abu Bakkar Siddique	279	0.1	N/A
JSD	Md. Shamsuzzoha Sarkar	170	0.1	N/A
Majority		6,454	2.6	−9.9
Turnout		244,674	84.4	+7.0
AL hold				

=== Elections in the 1990s ===
General Election June 1996: Dinajpur-5
Party	Candidate	Votes	%	±%
AL	Mostafizur Rahman Fizar	71,363	40.3	−5.9
JP(E)	Md. Abul Wahab Sarkar	49,153	27.7	−0.8
BNP	A. Z. M. Rezwanul Haque	42,811	24.1	N/A
Jamaat	M. A. Kaiyum	12,827	7.2	−4.8
Zaker Party	Md. Khatibur Rahman	747	0.4	−0.2
Jatiya Samajtantrik Dal-JSD	Md. Mozaffar Hossain	243	0.2	+0.1
Independent	Md. Rabiul Alam Munshi	141	0.1	N/A
Majority		22,210	12.5	−5.2
Turnout		177,285	77.4	+14.5
AL hold				

General Election 1991: Dinajpur-5
Party	Candidate	Votes	%	±%
AL	Mostafizur Rahman Fizar	66,533	46.2	
JP(E)	Md. Abul Wahab Sarkar	41,039	28.5	
Jamaat	M. A. Kaiyum	17,265	12.0	
BNP	Samsuddin Ahmed	13,622	9.5	
Independent	Mokbul Hossain	1,233	0.9	
BAKSAL	Md. Khatibur Rahman	1,102	0.8	
Zaker Party	Md. Rezaul Alam Bulbul	935	0.6	
WPB	Md. Mozammel Hossain Sarkar	502	0.3	
Independent	Shamsuddin Ahmed	469	0.3	
Independent	Mohammad Afsar Ali	414	0.3	
UCL	Md. Iner Uddin Mondol	241	0.2	
NDP	Md. Mahfujul Islam	217	0.2	
Jatiya Oikkya Front	Md. Sadakatul Bari	203	0.1	
JSD (S)	Md. Hafizar Rahman	174	0.1	
Jatiya Samajtantrik Dal-JSD	Md. Golam Ashraful Prodhan	151	0.1	
Majority		25,494	17.7	
Turnout		144,100	62.9	
AL gain from				
