= Parbatipur Upazila =

Parbatipur পার্বতীপুর
- Upazila
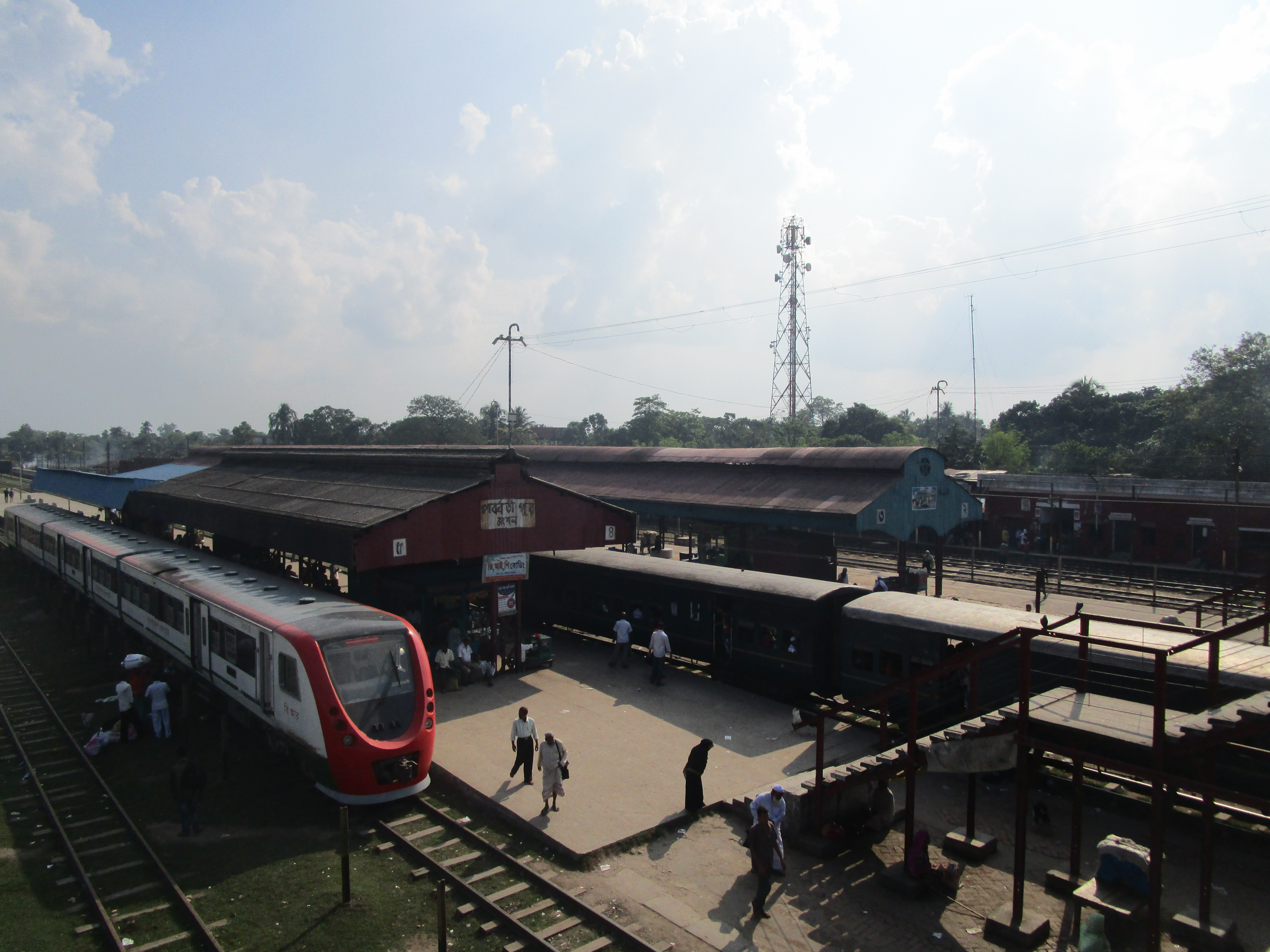
- Parbatipur Railway Junction

- Coordinates: 25.6533°N 88.9155°E
- Country: Bangladesh
- Division: Rangpur
- District: Dinajpur
- Thana: 1800
- Upazila: 1983

Government
  - Chief Executive Officer: Fatema Khatun

Area
  - Total: 395.04 km^{2} (152.53 sq mi)

Population (2022)
  - Total: 400,648
  - Density: 1,014.2/km^{2} (2,626.8/sq mi)
- Demonym: Parbatipuri
- Time zone: UTC+6 (BST)
- Postal code: 5250
- Area code: 0531
- Website: parbatipur.dinajpur.gov.bd

Parbatipur Upazila mauza geocode map

Parbatipur (Bengali: পার্বতীপুর, romanized: Parbatīpur) is an upazila (sub-district) of the Dinajpur District in northern Bangladesh, part of the Rangpur Division. It is home to the only active coal mine in Bangladesh, the Barapukuria Coal Mine.

== Etymology ==
The present-day area of Kholahati was the site of a small kingdom ruled by a local Raja called Kichak Rājā. Kichak's fort remains a place of interest in Parvatipur. Kichak had a daughter called Payravati (পায়রাবতী) or Parvati. Parvati was a child widow, and was once kidnapped by miscreants and taken to the nearby dighi (reservoir) of Dimali where she was assaulted in a dishonorable manner. She later committed suicide by drowning herself in the lake, and in her honour, the area was named by others as Parbatipur. Another theory suggests that the area was named after a Hindu deity known as Parvati, as the area was formerly home to a large Hindu population.

== History ==
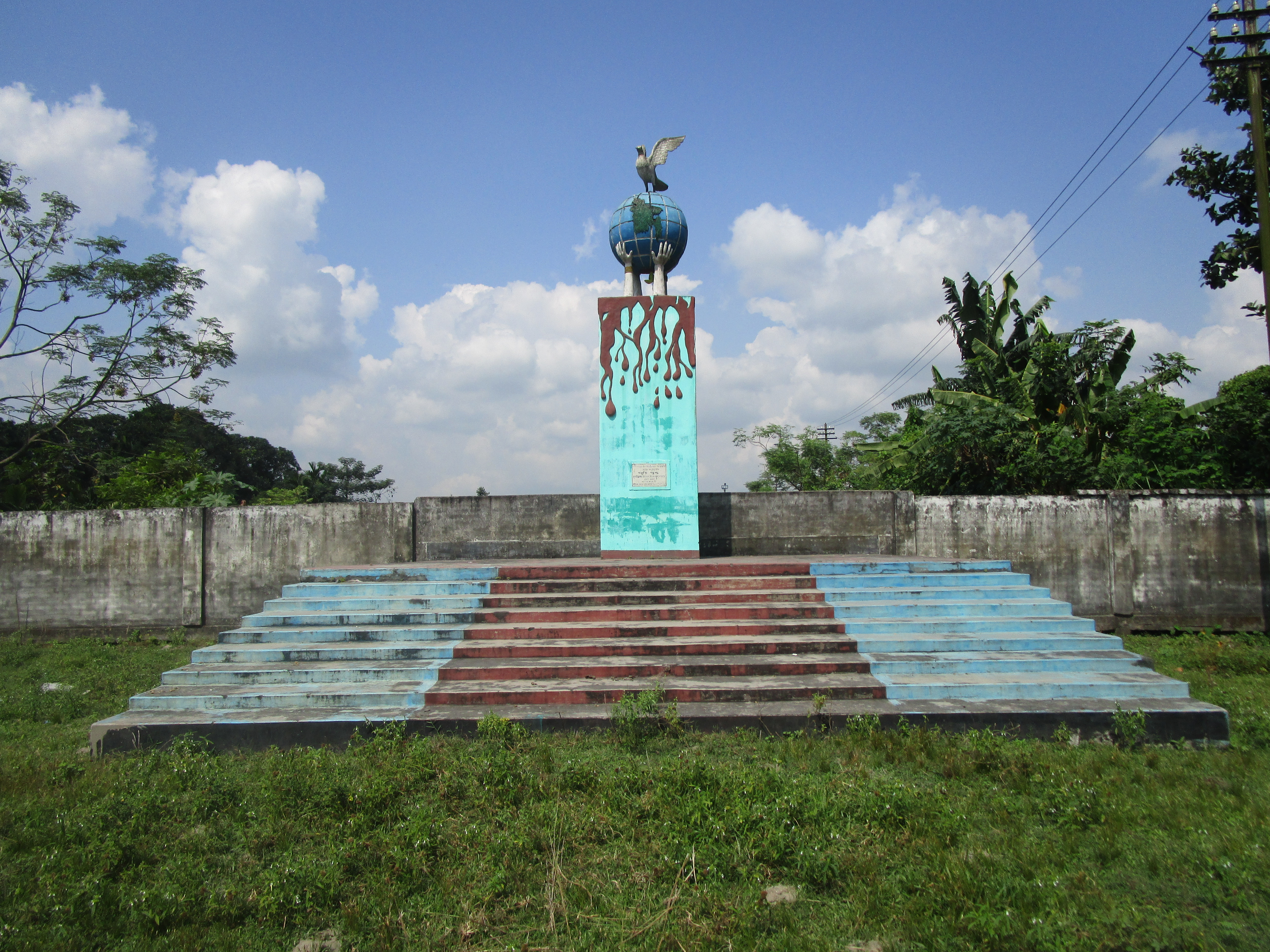
War Monument Parbatipur

In 1800, the British colonials established a thana in Parbatipur. The settlement of large numbers of Santals was promoted during this period. Following the Partition of India in 1947, a large number of Indian Muslims (mainly Bihari Muslims) migrated to East Bengal and settled in Parbatipur where they gained prominence as an influential community. During the Bangladesh Liberation War of 1971, 300 locals were mass murdered by the Pakistan Army and its collaborators in the areas of Peyadapara, Ramkrishnapur and Baghbari on the south of the Badarganj and Kholahati railway lines on 8 April. One of those murdered was Mohammad Shamshad Ali, a Bihari pharmacist who had supported the 1969 uprising. One of Parbatipur's martyred freedom fighters was Captain Mahbubur Rahman, and the Kholahati Cantonment was later renamed to his name following the war.

As part of the President of Bangladesh Hussain Muhammad Ershad's decentralisation programme, Parbatipur Thana was upgraded to an upazila in 1983. On 13 January 1985, a fire broke out on the Samanta Express train from Khulna to Parbatipur, and passengers pulled out the communication cord but the driver did not stop, apparently because robbers operate in the area. 27 people were killed with at least 58 injured, but news reports stated that 150 or more were killed.

== Geography ==
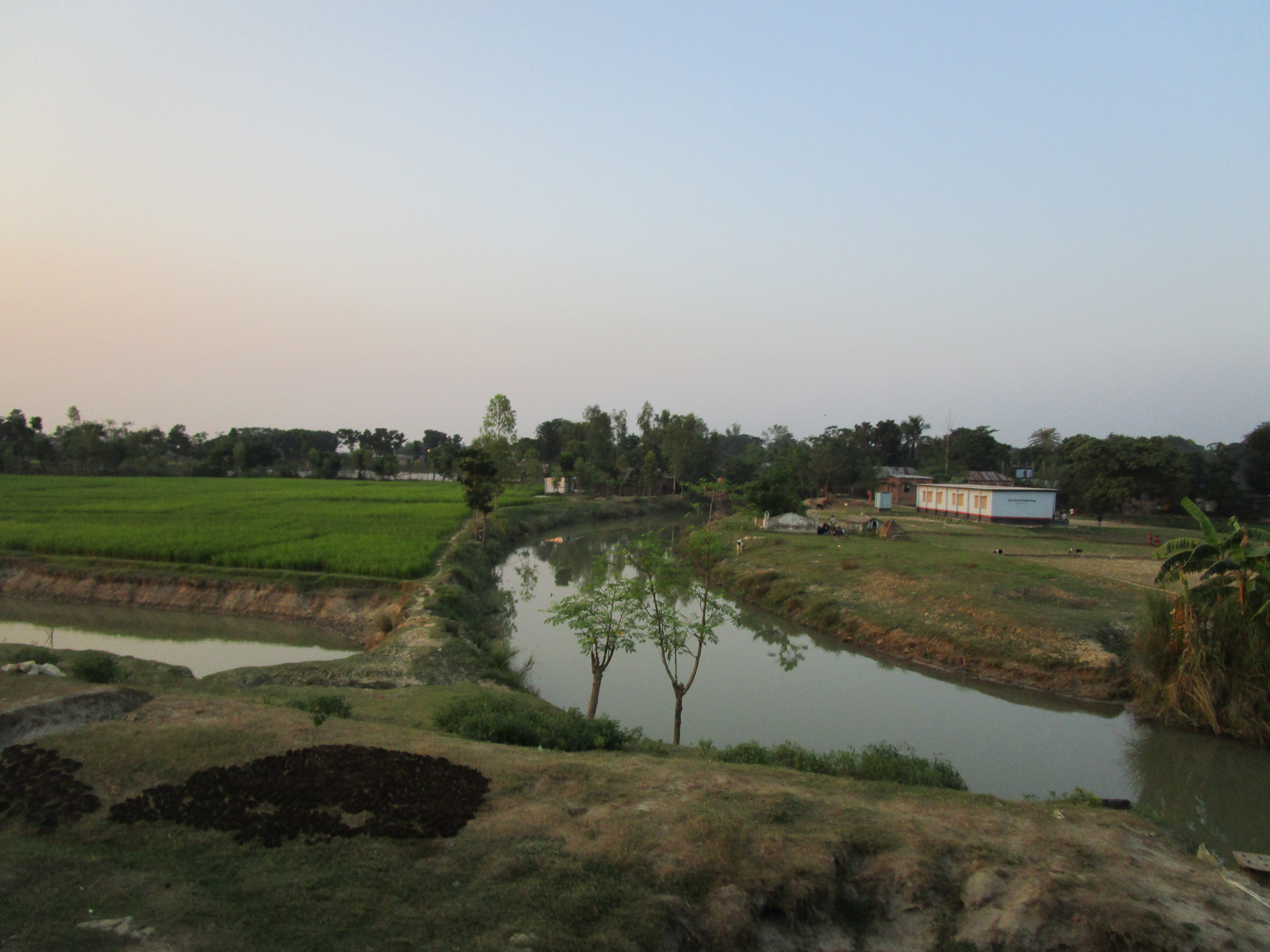
Khorkhoria River at Parbatipur Upazila.

Parbatipur is located at 25.6533°N 88.9155°E. It has a total area of 395.04 km^{2}.

The upazila is bounded by Saidpur Upazila of Nilphamari district on the north, Phulbari and Nawabganj upazilas on the south, Badarganj Upazila of Rangpur district on the east, Chirirbandar Upazila on the west.

== Demographics ==
Religions in Parbatipur Upazila (2022)
Religion	Percent
Islam	86.07%
Hinduism	12.59%
Christianity	0.92%
Other or not stated	0.42%

According to the 2022 Bangladeshi census, Parbatipur Upazila had 104,139 households and a population of 400,648. 9.04% of the population were under 5 years of age. Parbatipur had a literacy rate (age 7 and over) of 77.03%: 79.46% for males and 74.62% for females, and a sex ratio of 100.28 males for every 100 females. 60,474 (15.09%) lived in urban areas. Ethnic population is 4050 (1.01%) of which Santal are 3144.

According to the 2011 Census of Bangladesh, Parbatipur Upazila had 88,725 households and a population of 365,103. 81,676 (22.37%) were under 10 years of age. Parbatipur had a literacy rate (age 7 and over) of 53.86%, compared to the national average of 51.8%, and a sex ratio of 987 females per 1000 males. 39,983 (10.95%) lived in urban areas. Ethnic population was 4,453 (1.22%), of which Santal were 3,180.

As of the 1991 Bangladesh census, Parbatipur had a population of 270,904. Males constitute 51.46% of the population, and females 48.54%. Upazila's population of people eighteen years old or older is 139,294. Parbatipur has an average literacy rate of 29.7% (7+ years), compared to the national average of 32.4%.

The majority Bengalis (Muslim and Hindu) of Parbatipur speak the Dinajpuri dialect with the official language being Standard Bengali. There are also speakers of English, Urdu and Santali, with the latter two being spoken by the Stranded Pakistani and Santal population.

== Administration ==
UNO: Fatema Khatun.

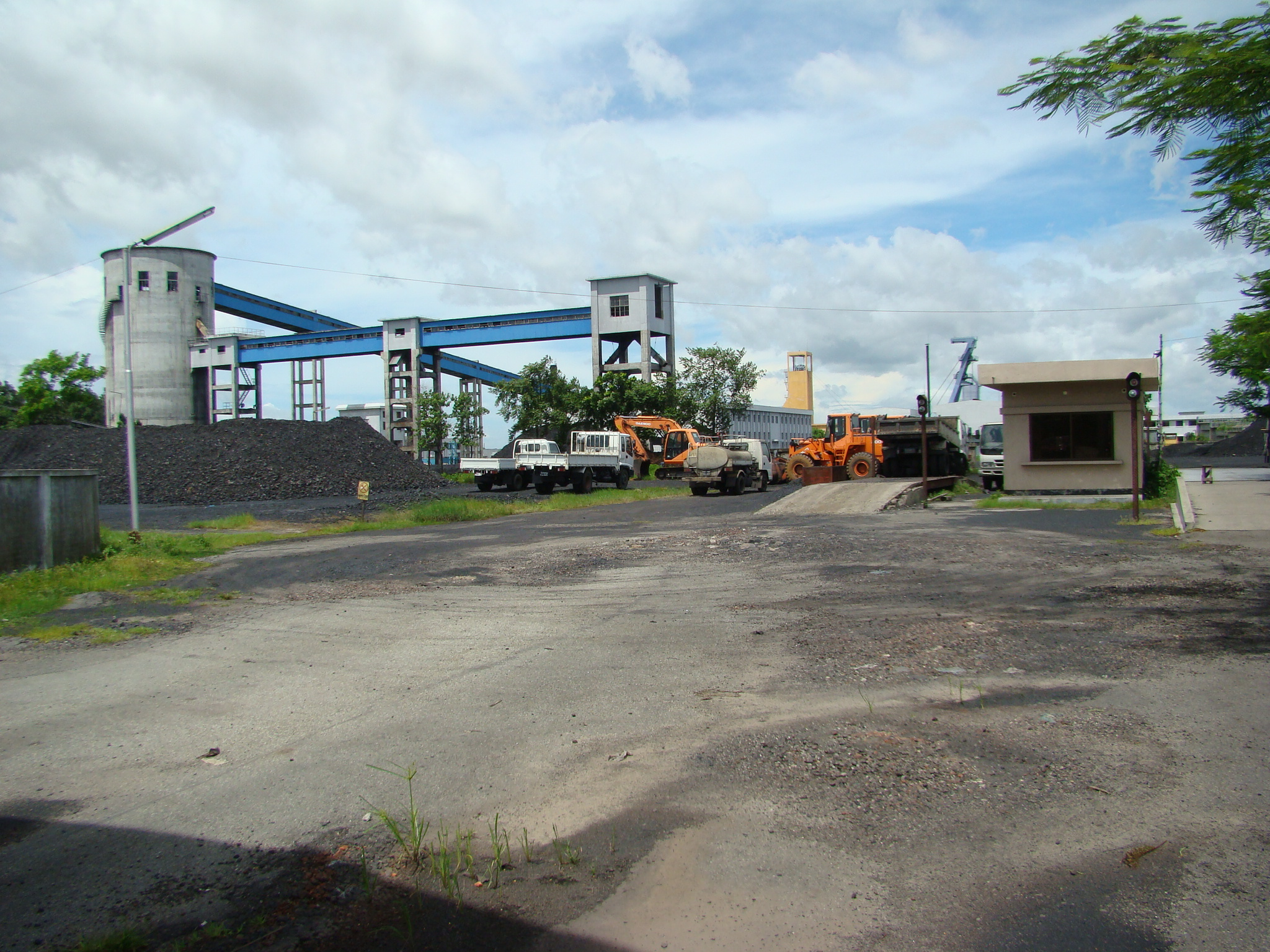
Barapukuria coalmine

Parbatipur, primarily formed as Thana in 1800 and it, turned into an upazila in 1983.

Parbatipur Upazila is divided into Parbatipur Municipality and ten union parishads: Belaichandi, Chandipur, Habra, Hamidpur, Harirampur, Mominpur, Monmothopur, Mostofapur, Polashbari, and Rampur. The union parishads are subdivided into 157 mauzas and 230 villages.

Parbatipur Municipality is subdivided into 9 wards and 36 mahallas.

=== Chairmen ===
List of chairmen
Name	Notes
Muhammad Tufazzal Husayn	25/6/1985-24/5/1990
Muhammad Abdul Jabbar Mandal	26/5/1990-22/5/1991
Alhaj Muhammad Hafizul Islam Pramanik Muzaffarnagari	23/2/2009–present

== Education ==
Parbatipur has many schools and colleges like,

- Harirampur High School
- Alo Residential Model School & College (Ranks no.1 in Parbatipur, Dinajpur),
- Moniria High School, Parbatipur, Dinajpur
- Parbatipur Adarsha Degree College
- Cantonment Public School & College BUSMS
- Parbatipur Govt. Degree College
- Kholahati Degree College
- Cantonment Board High School, BUSMS
- Parbatipur Agriculture College
- Parbatipur Mohila Agriculture College
- Manmathpur Ideal Degree College
- Janankur Pilot High School.
- Parbatipur Girls Pilot High School.
- Parbatipur Govt. Technical School & College
- Parbatipur Balika Biddapit School.
- Ainul Huda Fazil Madrasah, Ainul Huda (5250), Parbatipur, Dinajpur.
- Parbatipur Mohila Degree College
- Ambari M. L High School
- Barnamala Niketon High School & College, Parbatipur, Dinajpur.
- Mitaly high school Parbatipur, Dinajpur.
- Shohid srity gov. primary school, Parbatipur, Dinajpur.

== Economy and tourism ==
Parbatipur is home to numerous tourist sites. The ancient fort of Kichan Raja, a former local sovereign, can be found in Kholahati, Palashbari Union. Other places include the Harirampur Mound, Hirajira's Bhita, the Pancharatna Fort of Deol in Manmathpur Union and Habra Site.

Parbatipur is the focal point of the northern railway connection with different parts of Bangladesh. A four-way railway has been laid here. Therefore, it is one of the largest railway junctions and the pride of the factory and the upazila with bright potential in mineral resources. The Parbatipur Junction connects the area to the Burimari–Lalmonirhat–Parbatipur line. The Barapukuria coal mine is the only mine in Bangladesh. A part of the Saidpur Airport is in Parbatipur Upazila.

== Notable people ==
- Abdullah el Baqui, Islamic scholar, writer and politician
- AZM Rezwanul Haque, politician
- Jumbo, film actor
- Lutfullah al-Majid, former Minister of Fisheries and Livestock
- Mohammad Shamshad Ali, pharmacist
- Muhammad Abdul Bari, Islamic scholar, writer and teacher
- Sardar Mosharraf Hossain, politician
- Syed Abdus Samad, footballer

== See also ==
- Upazilas of Bangladesh
- Dinajpur District, Bangladesh
- American Camp
- LAMB Hospital, Bangladesh
