= Bakul Priya =

- Theatrical release poster
- Dvd cover
- Directed by: Swapan Saha
- Written by: Delwar Jahan Jhantu
- Screenplay by: Swapan Saha
- Story by: Delwar Jahan Jhantu
- Based on: Premer Somadhi by Delwar Jahan Jhantu
- Produced by: Maa Kali Chitramandir
- Starring: Prosenjit Chatterjee; Satabdi Roy; Abhishek Chatterjee; Subhendu Chatterjee; Manoj Mitra; Anushree Das; Subhasish Mukhopadhyay
- Music by: Anwar Jahan Nantu
- Release date: 1997
- Country: India
- Language: Bengali

Bakul Priya (Bengali: বকুল প্রিয়া) is a 1997 Bengali drama film directed by Swapan Saha and produced under the banner of Maa Kali Chitramandir. The film features actors Prosenjit Chatterjee and Satabdi Roy in the lead roles. This film was an unofficial remake of the 1996 Dhallywood film Premer Somadhi.

== Cast ==
- Prosenjit Chatterjee as Bakul
- Satabdi Roy as Priya
- Abhishek Chatterjee as Gourab
- Subhendu Chatterjee as Priya's Father
- Manoj Mitra as Bakul's Father
- Anushree Das
- Subhasish Mukhopadhyay
- Soham Chakraborty as Young Bakul
- Gora Sarkar
- Aditi Chattopadhyay

== Music ==
Music of the film has been composed by Anwar Jahan Nantu.

- "Jiboner Nouka Chole" – Andrew Kishore, Sabina Yasmin
- "Tumi Bondhu Amar, Chiro Sukhe Thako" – Andrew Kishore
- "Premer Somadhi Bhenge" – Andrew Kishore
- "Amare Ki Bhuila Gechho" – Sabina Yasmin
