= Mansur Ali Sarkar =

Bangladeshi politician

- মনসুর আলী সরকার

Member of the Bangladesh Parliament for Dinajpur-10
- In office 1979–1982

Minister of State for Education
- In office 1989–1990

Personal details
- Born: 11 March 1948 (age 78) Fulbari Bazar, Fulbari thana, British India
- Party: Bangladesh Nationalist Party
- Other political affiliations: Jatiya Party (Ershad)

Mansur Ali Sarkar is a Bangladesh Nationalist Party politician. He was elected a member of parliament from undivided Dinajpur-10 (current Dinajpur-5) in 1979. He was the minister of state for education and adviser to the president on education.

== Biography ==
Mansur Ali Sarkar was born on 11 March 1948 in Fulbari Bazar of what is now Fulbari Upazila, Dinajpur District, Bangladesh.

Mansur Ali Sarkar is a lawyer. He was elected to parliament from Dinajpur-10 (current Dinajpur-5) as a Bangladesh Nationalist Party candidate in the 1979 Bangladeshi general election. He joined the Jatiya Party in 1989. He served as the minister of state for education and later as the education advisor to the president. In 2006 he rejoined the Bangladesh Nationalist Party. He did not get party nomination from Dinajpur-5 in the 2008 and 2018 parliamentary elections.
