= Amalendu Biswas =

Bangladeshi actor

- Born: 29 May 1925; Rangoon, Burma, British India
- Died: October 13, 1987 (aged 61–62); Dhaka, Bangladesh
- Occupation: Actor
- Spouse: Jyotsna Biswas
- Children: Aruna Biswas

Amalendu Biswas (Bengali: অমলেন্দু বিশ্বাস; 29 May 1925 – 13 October 1987) was a Bangladeshi stage actor. Calling Jatra Samrat, he specialized in jatra pala genre. He won Sequence of Merit Award by Bangladesh Shilpakala Academy in 1980. He was awarded Ekushey Padak by the government of Bangladesh posthumously in 1989.

== Early life and education ==
Biswas was born in 1925, whilst his father Surendralal Biswas was working at the customs department in Yangon, Burma. He belonged to a Hindu family originally from the village of Masjidia in Sitakunda, Chittagong District. He later returned to Chittagong during his childhood, and completed his matriculation in 1941. He passed his FA from Robertson College in 1944.

== Career ==
Biswas started his career at the British Royal Air Force. He left the service during World War II and formed a jatra troupe Charanika Jatra Shamaj. He performed with the troupe Natta Company while he was in Kolkata.

As a result of the Partition of India in 1947, he opted for Pakistan and returned to East Bengal. He served in department of railways in East Pakistan. A police warrant was issued against him for joining the 1969 mass uprising against Ayub Khan.

== Personal life ==
Biswas was married to Jyotsna Biswas. Actress Aruna Biswas is their daughter.

== Legacy ==
In 2003, annual Amalendu Biswas Memorial Award was launched by Bangladesh Jatra Shilpa Unnayan Parishad (BJSUP) to award notable theater actors.

== Works ==
- Hitler
- Janoar
- Sirajuddaulah
- Ekti Paisa
- Michel Modhushudan
