= Gariber Sansar =

1996 film

- Movie poster
- Directed by: Delwar Jahan Jhantu
- Produced by: Bandhan Banichitra
- Starring: Shabana; Jashim; Bapparaj; Aruna Biswas; Danny Sidak; Dildar
- Music by: Anwar Jahan Nantu
- Release date: 1996
- Country: Bangladesh
- Language: Bengali

Gariber Sansar is a 1996 Bengali film directed by Delwar Jahan Jhantu and produced by Bandhan Banichitra. The music of the film was composed by Anwar Jahan Nantu.

== Cast ==
- Shabana as Rabiya
- Jashim as Jaman
- Bapparaj as Sujon
- Lima as Parul
- Aruna Biswas
- Danny Sidak as Sumon

== Music ==
| Song title | Composer | Lyricist | Singer(s) |
|---|---|---|---|
| "O Tui Kandis Nare Bon" (duet) | Anwar Jahan Jhontu | Delwar Jahan Nantu | Andrew Kishore, Runa Laila |
| "Rupero Rongbajite Chokhero Isharate" | Anwar Jahan Jhontu | Delwar Jahan Nantu | Andrew Kishore, Baby Naznin |
| "Tomar Chhobi Mone Ekechhi" | Anwar Jahan Jhontu | Delwar Jahan Nantu | Andrew Kishore, Kanak Chapa |
| "Ore Tingting Tingting Baaje Ghonta" | Anwar Jahan Jhontu | Delwar Jahan Nantu | Andrew Kishore |
| "Tetuler Achar Niye Feriwala Elore" | Anwar Jahan Jhontu | Delwar Jahan Nantu | Andrew Kishore |
| "O Tui Kadis Nare Bon" (male) | Anwar Jahan Jhontu | Delwar Jahan Nantu | Andrew Kishore |
