= Jumbo (actor) =

Bangladeshi film actor (1944–2004)

- জাম্বু
- Born: 1944; Dinajpur, Bengal Presidency, British India (Note: Sources disagree on his birthplace; see Early life.)
- Died: 3 May 2004 (aged 59–60); Dhaka, Bangladesh
- Other names: Jambu, Sukhlal Babu, Babul Gomez, Babulal
- Occupation: Film actor
- Children: 4

Jumbo (Bengali: জাম্বু; 1944 – 3 May 2004), also spelled Jambu, was a Bangladeshi film actor who played villains in Dhallywood films from the 1970s to the 1990s. His birth name is variously given as Sukhlal Babu, Babul Gomez and Babulal. The director Delwar Jahan Jhantu cast him in 1972 and named him after the jumbo jet because of his large build.

Jumbo was usually cast as a henchman or hired enforcer in commercial action films and often appeared opposite the action hero Jashim. His better-known roles include Mohammadi Beg in the colour film Nabab Sirajuddoula and Arjun Singh in Rajlakshmi Srikanta (1987); he played a rare sympathetic part in Atmorokkha. He acted in more than 250 films. He died in Dhaka on 3 May 2004.

== Early life ==
Jumbo was born in 1944. He has been described as born in Dinajpur, in a sweepers' colony in the railway town of Parbatipur in Dinajpur, where his forebears had settled after coming from India, and in the Ganaktuli city colony of Hazaribagh in Old Dhaka. He spent his childhood in the Parbatipur colony, and his family later settled in Manikganj. He had little formal education. He moved to Dhaka in search of work and was employed as a labourer and at Pilkhana before entering films.

His real name is uncertain, and people in the film industry gave different versions of it. His former landlord in Azimpur knew him as Sukhlal Babu. He first registered at the Bangladesh Film Development Corporation (FDC) as Babul Gomez, a name also spelled Babul Gomes. Jhantu recalled that he introduced himself as Babulal.

== Career ==
Jhantu met him in 1972 at Popular Studio, on the road to Narayanganj, while shooting a fight scene for his film Leader. He offered the tall, heavily built young man a part on condition that he shave his head, and after he agreed, gave him the name Jumbo. Leader was never released. The villain actor Tara introduced him to the FDC. Jumbo first drew attention in Sheeshnag, and his next film, Selim Javed, established him.

He worked through the black-and-white and colour periods of Bangladeshi cinema. With a shaved head, heavy build and harsh voice, he was cast mostly in menacing parts: the main villain's sidekick, a thug sent to raid a slum or abduct the heroine, or a hired killer. He rarely had large roles, and his characters usually died before the end of the film, killed by the hero or by the villain they served.

Jashim was his most frequent screen opponent, and their films together did well commercially. A recurring scene had Jashim slapping Jumbo across his bald head. They appeared together in Hero, in which Jumbo played a brutal leader of prison inmates, Rocky and Mohammad Ali. He played Zalim Singh in Rastar Raja.

Away from action films, he played Mohammadi Beg, the killer of Siraj-ud-Daulah, in the colour Nabab Sirajuddoula, and Arjun Singh in Rajlakshmi Srikanta (1987), adapted from a novel by Sarat Chandra Chattopadhyay. Both performances drew praise. His only sympathetic role came in Atmorokkha, starring Pallab, as a man forced to serve a woman named Dulari, whom his character kills at the end. He also sang in a few films.

== Legacy ==
The Daily Star described him in 2025 as one of Dhallywood's most recognisable villains, whose appearance alone was enough to frighten audiences. Stories circulated of mothers invoking him to scare children into sleep, and in the 1990s his name was a common nickname for heavily built people. A 2019 retrospective in Daily Bangladesh argued that he did not rank among the leading figures of Bangladeshi cinema, since he seldom played central characters and stayed within one type of role, but considered him a skilled actor who made an impression in even brief appearances.

The Channel i film programme Amar Chhobi paid tribute to him in its 17th-anniversary episode in January 2016.

== Personal life ==
Jumbo lived in Azimpur, Dhaka. He had two sons and two daughters. His younger son, Sambu, acted in several films and later performed in jatra across Bangladesh, billed as Jumbo's son. In 2019 Sambu said that no one from the film industry had kept in touch with the family after his father's death.

Jumbo died in Dhaka on 3 May 2004.

== Selected filmography ==
Films in which Jumbo appeared include:

- Achol Bondi
- Amor
- Angar
- Aparajito Nayok
- Aposh
- Atmorokkha
- Atmotyag
- Bagha Baghini
- Bijli Tufan
- Bijoy
- Biplob
- Bobi
- Bojropat
- Bondhu
- Boner Raja Tarzan
- Chakor
- Dakat
- Dayi Ke?
- Den Mohor
- Dhormo Amar Ma
- Dost Dushman
- Ek Mutho Bhat
- Ghatok
- Gola Barud
- Habildar
- Hasan Tarek
- Hero
- Jhumur
- Jodhdha
- Jyoti
- Kalia
- Khuner Bodla
- Matir Ful
- Miss Lanka
- Mohammad Ali
- Mrityodondo
- Murkho Manob
- Nabab
- Nabab Sirajuddoula
- Nirmom
- Nirdosh
- Nishpap
- Noya Layla Noya Mojnu
- Noyoner Alo
- Noyonmoni
- Otikrom
- Ovijan
- Palki
- Poribar
- Prem Diwana
- Raja Babu
- Rajlakshmi Srikanta (1987)
- Rakhal Raja
- Rasta
- Rastar Raja
- Rocky
- Rokter Dag
- Rubel Amar Nam
- Sagar Bhasa
- Sagorika
- Saja
- Samor
- Sathi
- Selim Javed
- Sheeshnag
- Shikar
- Shotru Dhongsho
- Sontras
- Tiger
- Usila
- Utthan Poton
