= Rupnarayan Roy =

Member of the Bengal Legislative Assembly
- In office 1946 - 1947
- Constituency: Dinajpur

Personal details
- Born: 1908(assumed) Phulbari Upazila, Dinajpur
- Died: 24 March 1974 Lalpurdanga, Amrabari Mauza, Phulbari Upazila, Dinajpur
- Party: Communist Party of India (until 1947); Communist Party of Pakistan (after 1947); National Awami Party(during ban on CPP); Communist Party of Bangladesh (from 1968)

Rupnarayan Roy was a veteran communist and peasant leader of undivided Bengal and then Bangladesh. One of the three first communist legislators who were elected to the Bengal Legislative Assembly in 1946. He died a martyr, some miscreants entered his house, called him from his bed at night and beheaded him.

== About ==
A marxist revolutionary, one of the top organizers of Tebhaga Movement, leader of anti-British movement, MLA of undivided Bengal, organizer of CPB-NAP-BSU led guerrilla force in the Bangladesh Liberation War.
