= Nayeem (actor) =

Bangladeshi actor

Khawaja Naim Murad
- খাজা নাইম মুরাদ
- Born: May 8, 1970 (age 56)
- Occupations: Actor; producer; director
- Years active: 1991–1997
- Spouse: Shabnaz (m. 1994)
- Children: 2
- Relatives: Khwaja Salimullah (great-grandfather); Dhaka Nawab family

Khawaja Naim Murad (born May 8, 1970), better known as Naim or Nayeem, is a Bangladeshi film actor, film producer, and television director. Naim made his acting debut alongside his wife, then-co-star film actress Sabreena Taniya Shabnaz Naim, popularly known as Shabnaz, in Ehtesham's Chandni (1991).

Following his success, Naim starred in 8 consecutive box office hits: Dil, Sonia, Zid, Love, Anutopto, Shakkhat, and Takar Ohonkar, all of which starred actress Shabnaz, making them the generation's most sought-after duo, "Naim-Shabnaz".

== Early and personal life ==
Naim was born in Dhaka, East Pakistan (now Bangladesh), on May 8, 1970, to Khawaja Murad and Asiya Panni Murad. Naim is the direct descendant of the Dhaka Nawab family. Naim's father was the grandson of Nawab Sir Khwaja Salimullah and son of Nawabzada Khawaja Hafizullah. On the other hand, Naim's mother is Mehedi Ali Khan Panni's daughter and the grand daughter of Haider Ali Khan Panni, brother of Wajed Ali Khan Panni (Chand Mia) of the Karatia Zaminder Family. When asked about his childhood, Naim mentioned he was always surrounded by art and music. He began playing tabla at the age of five. He has fond memories of hearing his father play the flute as a child, which sparked his love in music. In his teenage years he learned to play the guitar from the famous late guitarist and vocalist Niloy and Sheikh Ishtiaque. At the age of 16 Naim appeared alongside his sister Zeba Murad in the BTV music video " Cholo na Jai chole," which was sung by Shubro Dev and Sabah Tani. Following his popularity of the music video, he appeared in television commercials for Bata shoes and Sunsilk shampoo.

Naim has one younger sister, Zeba Murad, who is a writer and photographer. Pop singer Sabah Tani is his maternal first cousin.

On October 5, 1994, Naim married his co-star actress Shabnaz in a traditional Muslim wedding ceremony after a two-year courtship. They have two daughtersL Nameera Naim and Mahdiyah Naim.

== Filmography ==
Year	Films	Role	Notes	Ref.
1991	Chandni	Raju	Debut film; remake of Chakori	
1992	Lorai	Nayeem		
1992	Sonia	Nadim		
1992	Chokhe Chokhe	Shahed		
1992	Dil	Shaju		
1993	Zid	Raja		
1993	Love	Joy		
1993	Anutopto	Ratan		
1993	Shakkhat	Raisul Islam Rana		
1993	Takar Ohonkar	Juwel Chowdhury		
1994	Pul Ar Kata	Badshah		
1994	Agun Jole	Selim	Debut in as producer	
1995	Bisher Banshi	Selim		
1997	Ghore Ghore Juddho	Nadim		
1998	Sukher Ashai	Palash		
1999	Meyerao Mastan	Advocate Nasim		
2009	Nil Achol	Himself	Cameo appearance	

=== Television ===
Year	Title	Role	Notes	Ref.
2005–2006	Kach Ghar	Tayeb Jahan Khan	TV Serial on Boishakhi TV; also as story writer, director and producer	
2007	Prottaborton	—N/a	Telefilm; as director and producer	
