= Antora =

Bangladeshi actress (c. 1974 – 2014)

- অন্তরা
- Born: 1973/1974
- Died: 8 January 2014 (aged 40); Dhaka, Bangladesh
- Resting place: Azimpur, Dhaka, Bangladesh
- Occupation: Actress
- Years active: 1990s–2000s
- Spouse: Khokon
- Children: 2

Antora (Bengali: অন্তরা, pronounced [ˈɔntora]; 1973/1974 – 8 January 2014) was a Bangladeshi film actress.

== Life and career ==
Antora started her career in Dhallywood as a child actress, but later she began to work as a heroine. She acted in Premer Kasam, where her co-star Mahfuz Ahmed was at his film debut.

She died from a brain hemorrhage in January 2014 at Monowara Hospital in Dhaka, and was buried at Azimpur Cemetery.

== Selected filmography ==
- Boner Moto Bon
- Pagol Mon
- Premer Kosom
- Lady Rambo
- Amar Ma
- Dolon Chapa
- Shoytan Manush
- Fozor Ali Ashchhe
- Nag Naginir Prem
- Balika Holo Bodhu
- Lathi
- Goriber Ohongkar
- Premer Somadhi (1996)
- Hangor Nodi Grenade
