= Abdul Haque (Dinajpur politician) =

Bangladeshi politician

- আব্দুল হক

Member of Parliament for Dinajpur-5
- In office 1973–1975
- Succeeded by: Md. Shawkat Ali

Personal details
- Born: Dinajpur District
- Party: Bangladesh Awami League

Abdul Haque is a politician of Dinajpur District of Bangladesh and a former member of parliament for the Dinajpur-5 constituency in 1973.

== Career ==
Abdul Haque is a freedom fighter. He was elected to parliament from Dinajpur-5 as a Bangladesh Awami League candidate in the 1973 Bangladeshi general election.
