= Jyotsna Biswas =

Bangladeshi actor

- Occupation: Actress
- Spouse: Amalendu Biswas
- Children: Aruna Biswas
- Awards: Ekushey Padak

Jyotsna Biswas is a Bangladeshi stage actress specialized in jatra pala genre. She was awarded Ekushey Padak in 2011 by the Government of Bangladesh.

== Personal life ==
Biswas was married to stage actor Amalendu Biswas, also an Ekushey Padak winning jatra actor. Together they have a daughter, Aruna Biswas who is an actress and television drama director.
