= Sabah Tani =

Sabah Tani সাবা তানি
- Died: 19 February 2018 (aged 49) Dhaka, Bangladesh
- Instruments: Vocal

Sabah Tani (died 19 February 2018) was a Bangladeshi singer from the 1980s and 1990s. Her notable songs include "Kichhukhon", "Bhalobasa Bahurupi" and "Kono Baishakhi Raate Jodi".

== Early life ==
Tani grew up in Karatia Union, Tangail.

== Career ==
Tani served as a judge in the Sylhet region selection round of the reality show Close Up-1: Tomakei Khujchhey Bangladesh's 2012 edition. She had performed live music programs on television in 2016.

== Personal life ==
Tani was the cousin of film actor Nayeem. She had one son, Anid. She died of low blood pressure. She was buried in Gorai village in Tangail.
