= Jibon Jontrona =

Unreleased Bangladeshi film

- Directed by: Zahid Hossain; Khurshed Alam Khosro
- Screenplay by: Ahsan Habib Shokal
- Produced by: Khurshed Alam Khosro
- Starring: Manna; Moushumi; Popy; Bapparaj
- Music by: Ahmed Imtiaz Bulbul
- Production company: TOT Films
- Country: Bangladesh
- Language: Bengali

Jibon Jontrona is an unreleased Bangladeshi film directed by Zahid Hossain and Khurshed Alam Khosro and produced under the TOT Films banner. Jibon Jontrona is considered the last film featuring the late actor Manna, described by The Daily Star as a "massive star in Dhaka's film industry, synonymous with hit after hit". This film portrays the documented involvement of sex workers during the Bangladesh Liberation War, drawing on accounts describing how some sex workers assisted freedom fighters (Mukti Bahini) and undertook activities in support of the war effort.

== Cast ==
- Manna
- Moushumi
- Popy
- Misha Sawdagor
- Anwara
- Shahidul Alam Sachchu
- Ali Raj
- Bapparaj
- Dighi
- Shahnur

== Production ==
Manna died in 2008 with 15 percent of the film's shooting remaining. In 2011, the director used stand-in footage to complete the film and submitted it to the Bangladesh Film Censor Board under the name Lila Monthon. However, due to the censors' objections to the title, the film was delayed for an extended period. After that, the title was changed, and the film was submitted to the censors under the name Jibon Jontrona, and following censors approval, the film was supposed to be released.

The shooting of the film began in 2008, and the film was planned for release in 2013. However, the film was not released due to objections from the Censor Board to its original title, Lila Monthon. The title was subsequently changed to Jibon Jontrona and resubmitted, and the film is currently undergoing the censorship approval process.

== Release ==
The film was scheduled to be released on Independence Day, 26 March 2015. But the film was not released due to lack of clearance from the Bangladesh Film Censor Board.

The film was scheduled to be released in theaters on March 26, 2022, 17 years after shooting began, but it was not released. Although it was planned several times to the release, but it was postponed. Also the producer Khorshed Alam Khosru, had planned to release the film on 15 December 2023 but It was not released.
