= Chapa Dangar Bou =

- Poster
- Directed by: Abdur Razzak
- Screenplay by: Abdur Razzak; Rezaul Hasan (dialogue)
- Story by: Tarasankar Bandyopadhyay
- Based on: Tarasankar Bandyopadhyay's novel Chapadangar Bou
- Produced by: Abdur Razzak
- Starring: Shabana; ATM Shamsuzzaman; Bapparaj; Aruna Biswas
- Cinematography: Mahfuzur Rahman
- Edited by: Syed Mohammad Awwal
- Music by: Anwar Parvez
- Production company: Rajlokkhi Production
- Distributed by: Rajlokkhi Production
- Release date: 6 June 1986
- Running time: 126 minutes
- Country: Bangladesh
- Language: Bengali

Chapa Dangar Bou is 1986 Bangladeshi drama film directed and produced by Abdur Razzak under the banner of Rajlokkhi Production and its based on Tarasankar Bandyopadhyay's novel Chapadangar Bou. (Note: multiple sources:) It stars Shabana, ATM Shamsuzzaman, Bapparaj and Aruna Biswas in as lead role. The film's music score composed by Anwar Parvez. Its marks debut of Bapparaj and Aruna Biswas. (Note: multiple sources:)

== Cast ==
- Bapparaj as Mahatap
- Shabana as Kadambini
- Aruna Biswas as Manoda
- Hanif Sanket as Ghoton Ghosh
- ATM Shamsuzzaman as Setap Moral

== Legal issue ==
In 1986, a theatrical release conflict arose when film distributors attempted to block the Eid release of Chapa Dangar Bou. To avoid commercial competition with Azizur Rahman Buli's film Himmatwali, the Film Distributors Association secured a temporary restraining order to prevent Chapa Dangar Bou from being screened. In response, the film's director, Abdur Razzak, pursued legal action to counter the injunction. During the court proceedings, the presiding judge noted that since Advocate Rezaur Rahman, the legal counsel for the cinema owners, was absent and the district judge had not issued any prior directives on the matter, the stay order against the distributors' restriction would remain in effect. This legal outcome effectively cleared all remaining obstacles, allowing Chapa Dangar Bou to be released during the Eid festival as scheduled.

== Release ==
Chapa Dangar Bou directed by Nayak Raj Razzak released on June 6, 1986.

== Reception ==
Wroted by Mahmuda Choudhury from Weekly Bichitra and published by BMDb After the release of 'Chapa Dangar Bou', a short review of the film was published by Weekly 'Bichitra' of that time, "In the film Shabana has are excelled in the acting. Although not equal in every place, Bappa's fluency attracts attention". Wroted by Bangladesh Pratidin's survey as "it was commercial success in box office".

Wroted by Somoy News's survey as "Nayakraj Razzak has brought tears to the audience's eyes by bringing Tarasankar Bandyopadhyay's novel 'Chapa Dangar Bou' to celluloid". Wroted by Jagonews24's survey as "Bapparaj received praise for his performance in his first film". Wroted by Zoom Bangla's survey as "Hanif Sanket performed brilliantly as the village enemy in the film".
