= Mostafizur Rahman (politician, born 1953) =

Bangladeshi politician (1953–2024)

- মোস্তাফিজুর রহমান
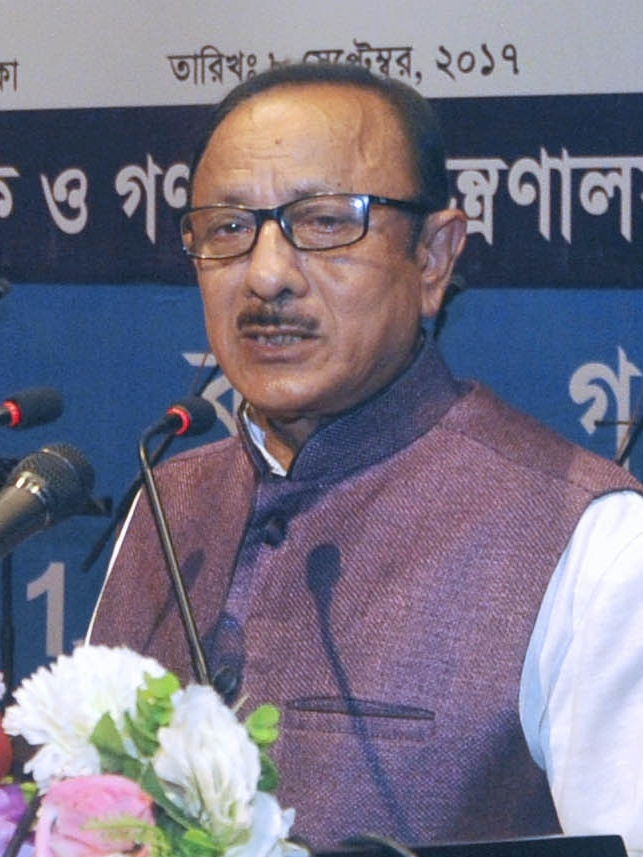
- Rahman at Shilpakala Academy (2017)

Member of the Bangladesh Parliament for Dinajpur-5
- In office 14 July 1996 – 6 August 2024
- Preceded by: AZM Rezwanul Haque
- Succeeded by: AZM Rezwanul Haque
- In office 5 March 1991 – 24 November 1995
- Preceded by: Mohammad Shoaib
- Succeeded by: AZM Rezwanul Haque
- In office 10 July 1986 – 6 December 1987
- Preceded by: Md. Shawkat Ali
- Succeeded by: Mohammad Shoaib

Minister of State for Primary and Mass Education
- In office 22 January 2014 – 24 January 2019
- Prime Minister: Sheikh Hasina
- Preceded by: Muhammad Afsarul Ameen
- Succeeded by: Md Zakir Hossain

Personal details
- Born: Mostafizur Rahman Fizar; 29 November 1953 Phulbari, Dinajpur District, Rajshahi Division, East Bengal, Pakistan
- Died: 29 September 2024 (aged 70) Dhaka, Bangladesh
- Party: Bangladesh Awami League
- Education: University of Rajshahi

Mostafizur Rahman Fizar (29 November 1953 – 29 September 2024) was a Bangladeshi politician who was the minister for primary and mass education, and a Jatiya Sangsad member who represented the Dinajpur-5 constituency for eight terms. He had previously served as the state minister for the Ministry of Environment and Forest and later took over the Ministry of Land as state minister, from 31 July 2009 to 21 November 2013.

== Early life ==
Fizar was born at Phulbari Upazila in Dinajpur District on 29 November 1953. He finished his SSC from the Sujapur High School and HSC in 1970 from Phulbari College. He fought in Sector-7 of the Bangladesh Liberation War in 1971. He completed his bachelor's and master's in law from Rajshahi University in 1977 and 1986, respectively.

== Career ==
In 1979, Fizar was the organizing secretary of Phulbari Thana Awami League. From 1980 to 1992, he was organizing secretary of the Dinajpur District Awami League. From 1992 to 2012, he was elected the general secretary of the Dinajpur District Awami League. In 2013, he was elected president of the Dinajpur District Awami League.

Fizar was elected member of Jatiya Sangsad six consecutive times beginning in 1986 from Dinajpur-5. In the seventh parliament, he served as the chairman of the standing committee on disaster management and relief ministry. He also served as a member of the parliamentary standing committee on public accounts and on the communication ministry. He was appointed the state minister of environment and forest. From 31 July 2009 to 21 November 2013, he was the state minister of land.

== Death ==
Rahman died at Labaid Hospital in Dhaka on 29 September 2024, at the age of 70.
