= American Camp =

American Camp আমেরিক্যান ক্যাম্প
- Village
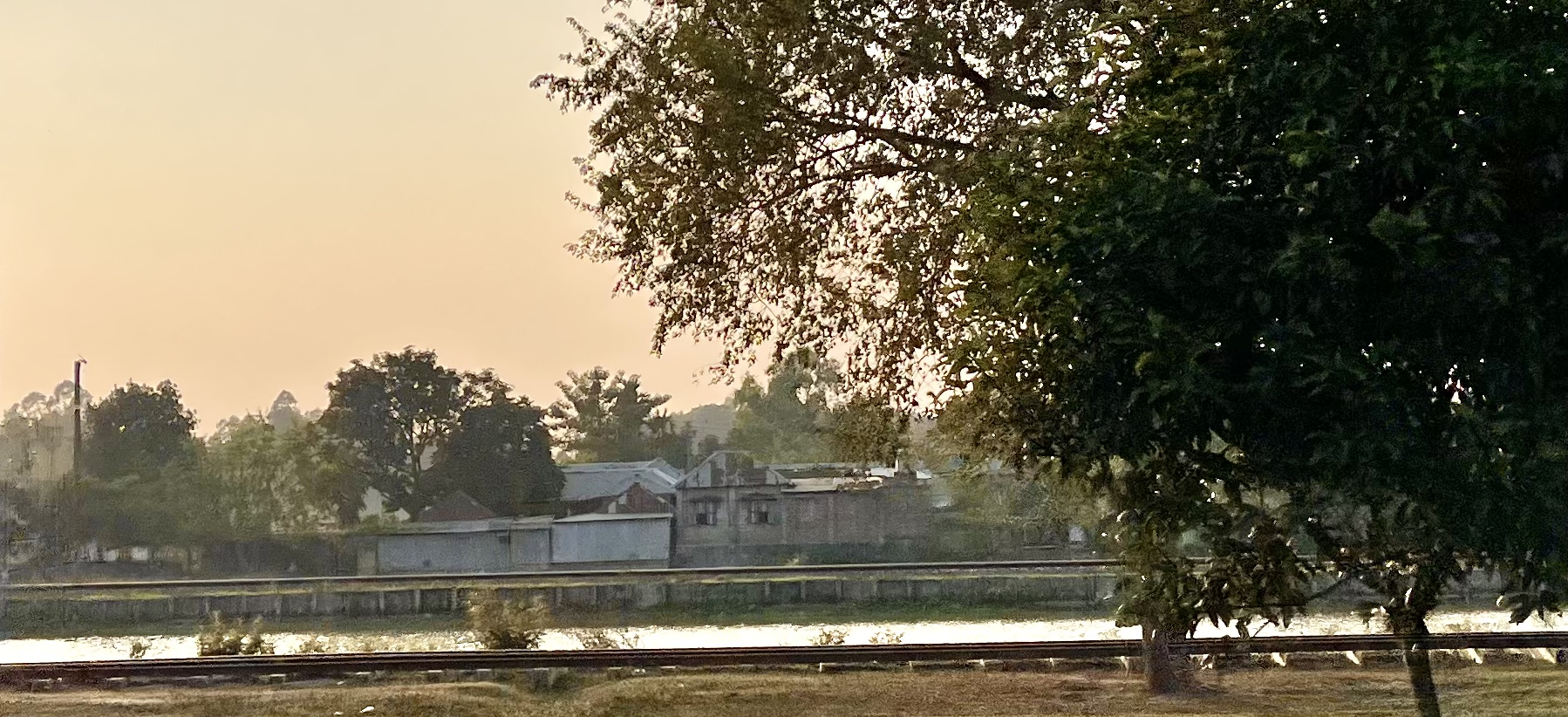

- Location within Bangladesh
- Coordinates: 25.669566014649867°N 88.91011582925445°E
- Country: Bangladesh
- Division: Rangpur
- District: Dinajpur

Government
  - Type: Municipality
  - Body: Mayor

Population (2023)
  - Total: 1,580

Languages
  - Official: Bengali, Rangpuri, English.
- Time zone: UTC+6 (BST)
- Post Code: 5250

American Camp (Bengali: আমেরিক্যান ক্যাম্প) is a village located in Ward No. 2 of Parbatipur Municipality, Parbatipur Upazila, Dinajpur District in the division of Rangpur, Bangladesh.

== See also ==
- List of villages in Bangladesh
