= Lima (actress) =

Bangladeshi actress

- লিমা
- Born: Shamima Ali Lima; 22 September 1979 (age 46); Daudkandi, Comilla
- Occupation: Actress
- Years active: 1992–1998

Shamima Ali Lima (22 September 1979), known as Lima, is a Bangladeshi former actress who worked in Dhallywood cinema. She was made her debut in the film industry with the film Sukher Agun (1992).

== Career ==
Shamima Ali Lima was born on 22 September 1979 in Daudkandi, Comilla. She grew up in Dhaka. Lima is the eldest of the three sisters. She started acting since childhood. 9-year-old little Lima started her journey in the industry. Gradually he started doing well in acting, dancing and singing. Then joined the movie. The 90s film 'Prem Geet' changed Lima's career. The film was released in 1993.

Nineties actress Lima. Acted with actors like Salman Shah, Alamgir, Omar Sani. She gained popularity by acting in 25 movies in just 8 years of acting career. At the end of 1998, she suddenly walked away from acting.

== Biography ==
Lima acted in Premjuddho in 1994 where her co-star was Salman Shah. In 1995 she acted in Konyadan where Salman Shah was her co-star too. In the last part of 90s she left Dhallywood. Then she connected herself with the business Beauty Parlour in New Market and Mohammadpur. She is now living in the United States.

== Selected filmography ==
Year	Film	Role	Notes	Ref.
1992	Sukher Agun	Lima	Debut film	
1992	Lorai	Shamima		
1993	Nag Naginir Prem			
1993	Lady Inspector	Lima		
1993	Shotorko Shoytan	Meghna		
1993	Prem Geet	Moyuri		
1993	Jonom Dhukhi	Lopa		
1993	Habildar			
1993	Boner Raja Tarzan	Mali		
1994	Duhshahosh			
1994	Dakat	Lipi		
1994	Prem Juddho	Priya		
1994	Onnay Ottachar	Sheuly		
1994	Judge Barrister	Singer Madhubi / Rubina		
1994	Ghorer Shotru	Jyoti		
1995	Konnadaan	Borsha		
1995	Banglar Commander	Chadni		
1995	Chakrani	Baby		
1995	Hulia	Moyna		
1995	Agnee Shakkhor	Neela		
1995	Khomotar Lorai	Neela		
1996	Ajker Foysala			
1996	Bagha Baghini			
1996	Gariber Sansar	Parul		
1997	Neel Shagorer Teere			
1997	Attoshat			
1998	Bipod Songket	Mohua		
