= Anjuman Ara Shilpi =

- আঞ্জুমান আরা শিল্পী
- Citizenship: Bangladesh
- Occupation: Actress
- Years active: 1995–2000

Anjuman Ara Shilpi is a retired Bangladeshi film and television actress. Her first film, Banglar Commando, was released on 5 May 1995. She performed in 36 films between 1995 and 2000. She then retired from her acting career.

== Career ==
Shilpi grew up in Dhaka but her father is originally from India and mother from Narayanganj. Her maternal uncle helped her get on stage in Narayanganj.

Shilpi's first film acting role was in Nag Nortoki. But her first film, Bangla Commando, was released on 5 May 1995. She became notable after her performance with Salman Shah at the film Priyojon. She withdrew from making films in 2000. The last films of hers to be released were Razzak's Premer Naam Bedona and Dewan Nazrul's Sujon Bondhu.

Shilpi had made her television debut in the drama Amrai, directed by Abdullah Al Mamun. She continued working in dramas irregularly until 2013.

== Personal life ==
Shilpi is married to Premier Bank chairman & former Awami League member of parliament HBM Iqbal. She moved to the United States when their son, Sanat Iqbal, was born in 2012. Two years later they had a daughter, Angelina Iqbal. After the fall of Sheikh Hasina's government on 5 August 2024, the Bangladesh Financial Intelligence Unit ordered the freezing of Iqbal & his family members' bank accounts, including Anjuman's.

== Filmography ==
- Banglar Commando (1995)
- Nag Nortoki
- Priyojon (1996)
- Lompot
- Baba Keno Chakor (1997) as Mita
- Ke Amar Baba (1999)
- Bir Santan
- Dost Amar Dushaman
- Housewife
- Khoma Nei
- Love Letter
- Mithyaar Mruthi
- Mukti Chai
- Rajpather Raja (1999)
- Shesh Pratiksha
- Shokter Bhokto
- Veer Ishan
- Premer Naam Bedona
- Sujon Bondhu (2001)
