= Aruna Biswas =

Bangladeshi actress

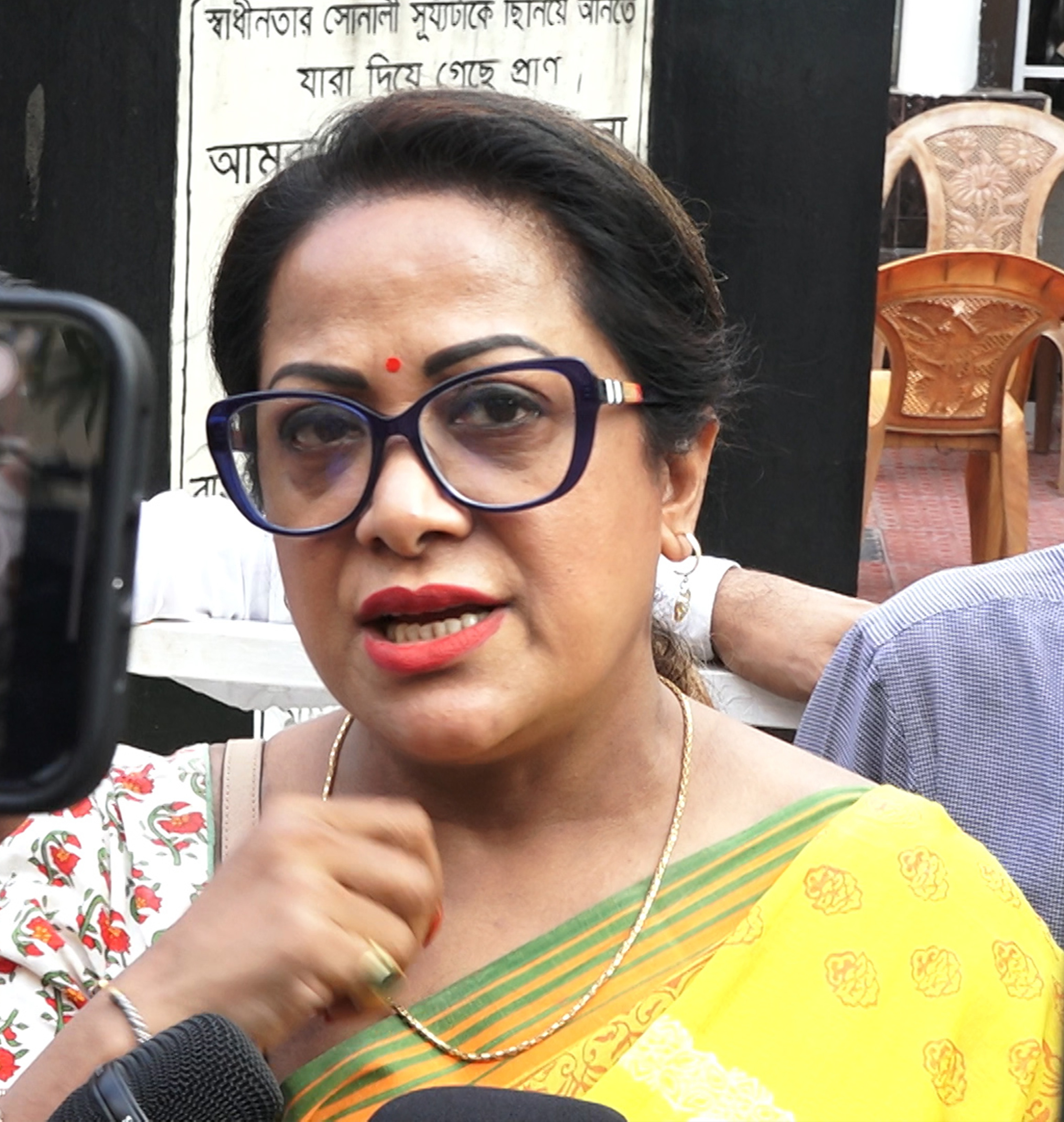
- Occupations: Actress, director, producer
- Children: 1
- Parent(s): Amalendu Biswas; Jyotsna Biswas

Aruna Biswas is a Bangladeshi television, stage and film actress. She is a television drama director.

== Personal life ==
Biswas is the daughter of jatra activists Amalendu Biswas and Jyotsna Biswas.

Aruna has a son, Shuddha, who lives in Canada.

== Career ==
Biswas debuted in the film industry in 1986.

Biswas serves as the chairwoman of the production house Jatravision. As of 2019, Biswas has acted in over 100 films. After 6 years staying in Canada, Biswas returned to Bangladesh. She directed her first TV serial Onnorokomer Lojja for Channel I. Then she completed Dolonchampa by Kazi Nazrul Islam, Boner Papiya and Dristhtidaan by Rabindranath Tagore, Shure Eka Chobi and Boro Didi by Sarat Chandra Chattopadhyay.

Biswas hosted television shows like Food Caravan on NTV and Nachey Gaaney Number One on Ekushey Television.

== Controversies ==
In 2024, during the Student–People's uprising, Aruna Biswas expressed support for the government amidst allegations of repression and violence against the protesters by the Awami League administration. Reports suggest that a group of artists aligned with the Awami League party, including Biswas, were active in a WhatsApp group named Alo Ashbei (English: There'll be light), reportedly led by actor Ferdous Ahmed, to oppose the movement. Following the non-cooperation phase of the protests, on September 3, 2024, screenshots purportedly linked to discussions within this WhatsApp group surfaced on social media, where she suggested that they should ‘Pour hot water on them [protesters]’ and that all protesters are 'jamaat-shibir activists', which drew attention and criticism online.

In September 2024, following the controversy, she left Bangladesh and went to Canada to her son.

== Works ==
- Chapa Dangar Bou (1986)
- Parash Pathar (1986)
- Durnam (1989)
- Goriber Bou (1990)
- Danga Fasaad (1990)
- Mayer Dowa (1990)
- Koifeyot (1990)
- Ochena (1991)
- Nisshartha (1991)
- Lal Benarashi (1991)
- Khoma (1992)
- Gorom Hawa (1992)
- Mayer Kanna (1992)
- Mayer Ashirbad (1993)
- Obujh Sontan (1993)
- Prem Shakti (1993)
- Dushahosh (1994)
- Shashon (1995)
- Goriber Songshar (1996)
- Nishthur (1996)
- Premer Sriti (1996)
- Hangor Nodi Grenade as Nita (1997)
- Five Rifles (1997)
- Fashi (1997)
- Jollad (1998)
- Tyag (2004)
- Chachchu (2006)
- Dadima (2006)
- Kabin Nama (2007)
- Mon Jekhane Hridoy Sekhane (2009)
- Antaranga (2015)
- Dulabhai Zindabad (2017)
- Bhalo Theko (2018)
- Ratrir Jatri (2019)
- Mayaboti (2019)
- Shaan (2022)
- Antaratma (2025)

=== Television ===
- Amader Nurul Huda
