= Chandni (1991 film) =

Bangladeshi musical romantic drama film

- Poster
- Directed by: Ehtesham
- Starring: Nayeem; Shabnaz; Sadek Bachchu
- Music by: Anwar Parvez
- Production company: Ajanta Kothachitra
- Distributed by: Ajanta Kothachitra
- Release date: 4 October 1991
- Country: Bangladesh
- Language: Bengali
- Budget: ৳50 lakh (US$41,000)
- Box office: ৳15 crore (US$1.2 million)

Chandni is a 1991 Bangladeshi musical romantic drama film directed by Ehtesham. The film was produced and distributed by Ajanta Kothachitra. It stars Nayeem and Shabnaz in the lead roles and it is the debut film of both of them. It was released in theaters on 4 October 1991. The film was a critical and commercial success. The film was a remake of Ehtesham's 1967 film Chakori.

== Cast ==
- Nayeem as Raju
- Shabnaz as Chadni
- Sadek Bachchu

== Release ==
On 4 October 1991, the film Chandni directed by Ehtesham was released in 25 cinemas across the country.

== Response ==
Reported by Prothom Alo's survey as "Shabnaz made a huge impact by playing the role of in the film".

Reported by Bangla Tribune's survey as "The film received a huge response at the time for its songs, dialogues, and the outstanding performances of the hero and heroine".

Reported by The Daily Star's survey as "Nayeem established a strong position in Dhaka cinema in a few years for his outstanding performance in the film."
