= Md. Shawkat Ali =

Bangladeshi politician

- শওকত আলী

Member of Parliament for Dinajpur-5
- In office 1979–1982
- Preceded by: Abdul Haque
- Succeeded by: Mostafizur Rahma

Personal details
- Born: November 4, 1929 Ghora Dhap, Pirganj thana, British India
- Party: Awami League

Md. Shawkat Ali (born 1929) was a politician of Dinajpur District, Bangladesh, and a member of parliament for constituency Dinajpur-5.

== Biography ==
Md. Shawkat Ali was born on 4 November 1929 in Ghora Dhap village of what is now Pirganj Upazila, Thakurgaon, Bangladesh.

He was a lawyer. He was elected to parliament for Dinajpur-5 as an Awami League (Malek) candidate in the 1979 Bangladeshi general election.

He died before 2021.
