= Baba Keno Chakor =

Bangladeshi family drama film

- Movie poster
- Directed by: Abdur Razzak
- Screenplay by: Abdur Razzak
- Story by: Zaman Akhter
- Produced by: Abdur Razzak
- Starring: Abdur Razzak; Dolly Johur; Bapparaj; Anjuman Ara Shilpi
- Cinematography: Reza Latif
- Edited by: Syed Awlad
- Music by: Alauddin Ali
- Production company: Rajlakkhi Production
- Release date: 8 August 1997
- Running time: 156 minutes
- Country: Bangladesh
- Language: Bangla
- Box office: ৳3 crore (equivalent to ৳17 crore or US$1.4 million in 2024)

Baba Keno Chakor (Bengali: বাবা কেন চাকর) is a 1997 Bangladeshi family drama film. It is directed, screenplay and produced by Abdur Razzak under the banner of his Rajlakkhi Production with story and dialogue by Zaman Akhter. It features Abdur Razzak and Dolly Johur in the lead roles and Amit Hasan, Anjuman Ara Shilpi, Bapparaj, Kajol and Mithun played in supporting roles. The song "Amar Moto Eto Shukhi Noyto Karo Jibon" sung by Khalid Hasan Milu from the film is considered to be one of the best songs of Razzak's career.

== Synopsis ==
The family reality of a father's last age is shown in the film. The carelessness of the elder son and his wife, the responsibility of the younger son. Realistic aspects including the death of the wife are included in the film.

== Cast ==
- Abdur Razzak as Rakib Ahmed
- Dolly Johur as Shahana, Rakib's wife
- Bapparaj as Shamim Ahmed, Rakib's younger son
- Anjuman Ara Shilpi as Mita, Shamim's love interest
- Mithun as Shakil Ahmed, Rakib's elder son
- Kajol as Khushi, Rakib's daughter
- Amit Hasan as Asif, Iqbal's son
- Majid Bongobashi
- Sharbori Dasgupta
- Ariful Haque
- Abul Hayat as Iqbal, Rakib's childhood friend
- Morjina

== Soundtrack ==
Baba Keno Chakor

Soundtrack album by Alauddin Ali
- Released: 1 January 1997
- Genre: Feature Film Soundtrack
- Length: 37:00
- Language: Bangla
- Producer: Alauddin Ali

Alauddin Ali chronology
Shudhu Tumi (1997)	Baba Keno Chakor (1997)	Baba Keno Chakor (1998)

The soundtrack of the film is composed by Alauddin Ali and all the songs penned by Mohammad Rafiquzzaman, which consisting seven songs.

Track Listing
No.	Title	Singer(s)	Length
1.	"Amar Moto Eto Shukhi"	Khalid Hasan Milu	4:52
2.	"Amar Moto Eto Shukhi" (Sad Version)	Khalid Hasan Milu	2:20
3.	"Rail Gari Jumajhum"	M A Khalek	3:23
4.	"Ami Bodhu Seje Thakbo"	Mitali Mukherjee, Agun	5:08
5.	"Bhalobeshe Jodi Dako"	Mitali Mukherjee, Sujoy Kumar	7:05
6.	"Bhalobasha Ondho"	Mitali Mukherjee, Sujoy Kumar	4:40
7.	"Ekla Komo Kotha"	Mitali Mukherjee, Sujoy Kumar	4:57
Total length:			32:00

== Reception ==
In an interview with Prothom Alo in 2024, Dolly Johur confirmed that the film had grossed ৳3 crore (equivalent to ৳17 crore or US$1.4 million in 2024).

== Re-made ==
The film was remade in Bengali in India under the same name in 1998 under the direction of Swapan Saha, with Razzak reprising the lead role.
