= Fulbari Upazila =

Fulbari ফুলবাড়ী
- Upazila
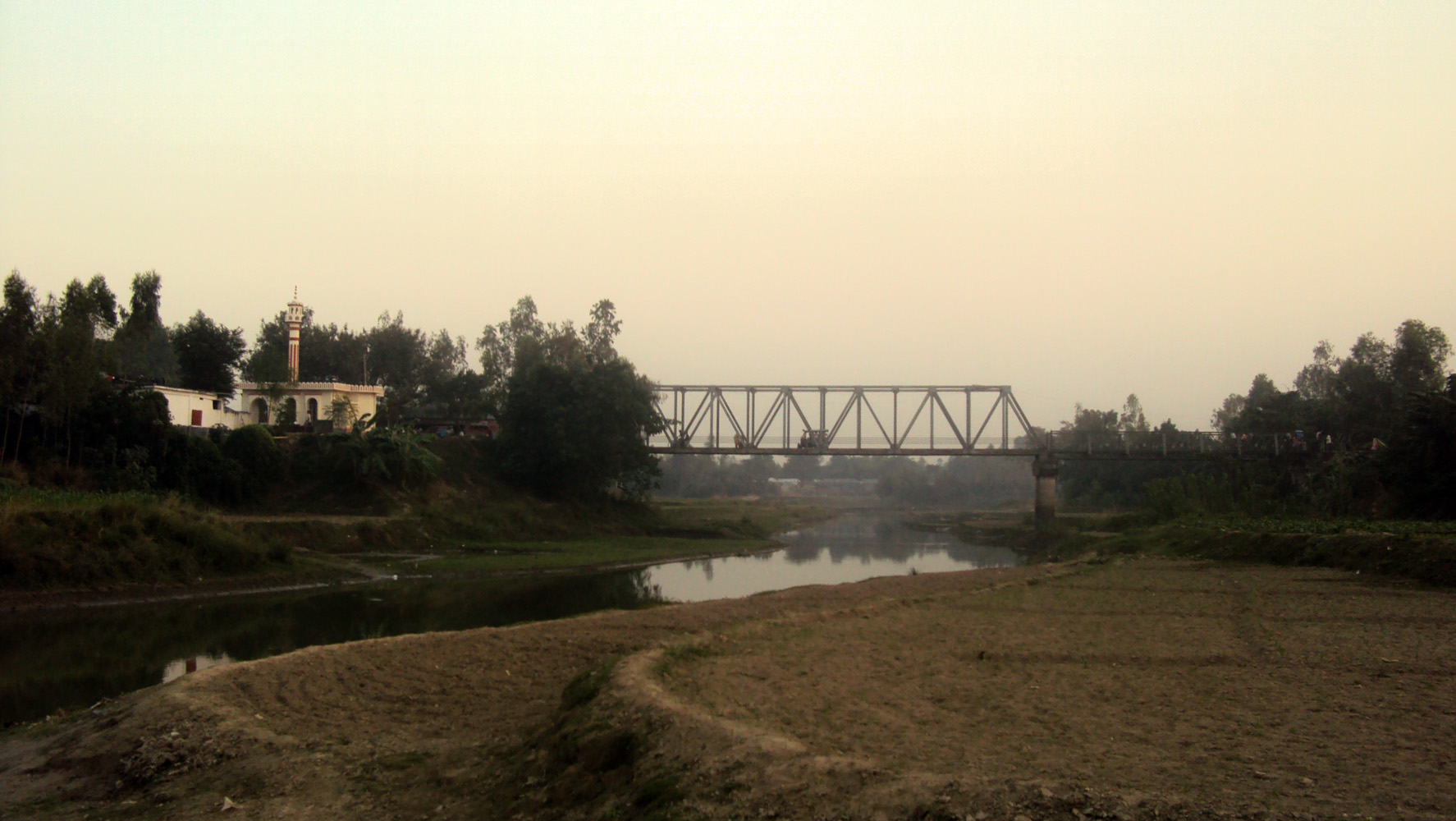
- Fulbari Bridge and countryside

- Coordinates: 25°31′N 88°53′E
- Country: Bangladesh
- Division: Rangpur
- District: Dinajpur

Area
  - Total: 228.49 km^{2} (88.22 sq mi)

Population (2022)
  - Total: 194,569
  - Density: 851.54/km^{2} (2,205.5/sq mi)
- Time zone: UTC+6 (BST)
- Postal code: 5260
- Area code: 05327
- Website: Official Map of Fulbari

Fulbari Upazila mauza geocode map

Fulbari (Bengali: ফুলবাড়ী) is an upazila of Dinajpur District in Rangpur Division, Bangladesh.

== Geography ==
Fulbari is located at 25.5167°N 88.8833°E. It has 43,137 households and total area 228.49 km^{2}.

Fulbari Upazila is bounded by Parbatipur and Chirirbandar Upazilas on the north, Nawabganj and Birampur Upazilas on the east, Birampur Upazila on the south and Kumarganj CD Block on the west.

== Demographics ==
Religions in Fulbari Upazila (2022)
Religion	Percent
Islam	83.70%
Hinduism	13.66%
Christianity	2.04%
Other or not stated	0.60%

According to the 2022 Bangladeshi census, Fulbari Upazila had 50,295 households and a population of 194,569. 8.37% of the population were under 5 years of age. Fulbari had a literacy rate (age 7 and over) of 77.61%: 79.85% for males and 75.41% for females, and a sex ratio of 99.58 males for every 100 females. 44,731 (22.99%) lived in urban areas.

According to the 2011 Census of Bangladesh, Fulbari Upazila had 43,137 households and a population of 176,023. 36,511 (20.74%) were under 10 years of age. Fulbari had a literacy rate (age 7 and over) of 52.58%, compared to the national average of 51.8%, and a sex ratio of 978 females per 1000 males. 34,786 (19.76%) lived in urban areas. According to the 2022 census, total population was 194,569. Ethnic population was 3,587(1.84%) in which Santal people was 3,260.

Population of upazila by ethnicity (2022)
1. Bengali (98.2%)
2. Santal (1.68%)
3. Others (0.16%)

As of the 1991 Bangladesh census, Fulbari has a population of 129,435. Males constitute 51.51% of the population, and females 48.49%. This Upazila's population over age of eighteen is 67,837. Fulbari has an average literacy rate of 31.7% (7+ years); the national average is 32.4% literate. Fulbari Upazila (dinajpur district) with an area of 229.55 km^{2}, is bounded by Parbatipur and Chirirbandar upazilas on the north, Birampur upazila on the south, Nawabganj (Dinajpur) and Birampur upazilas on the east, West Bengal of India on the west. Little Jamuna is the main river.

Fulbari (Town) consists of 9 wards and 11 mahallas. The area of the town is 16.03 km^{2}; population 28557; male 51.05%, female 48.95%. The density of population is 1781 per km^{2}. The literacy rate among the town people is 55.1%.

== Economy ==
Fulbari is an important business centre. Its importance grew significantly with the development of the Barapukuria coal mine and the Madhyapara hardrock mine, both located within a few kilometres from the town.

The government was working in 2006 with Asia Energy (now Global Coal Resources PLc - GCR) on a plan to develop an open-pit mine in Fulbari, Dinajpur. Opponents have protested the plans because of adverse environmental and social effects. An estimated 120,000 people may be displaced, including indigenous groups. Protesters have said such a mine would endanger an important food-producing region, as well as the quality of the water supply depended on by tens of thousands of people. There were major protests in Bangladesh in 2006, and the government closed the mine. As talks began again on the project, protesters conducted a week-long march from Fulbari to Dhaka in October 2010. In December 2010, an alliance of groups protested in London at a meeting of GCR company officials and stockholders.

== Administration ==
Phulbari Thana was formed in 1857 and it was turned into an upazila in 1984.

The Upazila is divided into Fulbari Municipality and seven union parishads: Aladipur, Aloary, Bethdighi, Daulatpur, Kazihal, Khairbari, and Shibnagor. The union parishads are subdivided into 158 mauzas and 152 villages.

Fulbari Municipality is subdivided into 9 wards and 14 mahallas.

== Notable people ==
- Rupnarayan Roy, Communist member of the Bengal Legislative Assembly, was murdered at his home in Fulbaria.
- Mansur Ali Sarkar, member of parliament and deputy minister for education, lived in Fulbari.
- Mainus Sultan, Bangla Academy Literary Award-winning travel author, was born in Fulbari village in 1956.
- Mustafizur Rahman Fizar, Current Member of Parliament. Formerly, Minister of Primary and Mass Education, State Minister for Land, and State Minister for Environment and Forestry of Government of Bangladesh.

== Archaeology ==
Swadhin Sen identified 15 early medieval (6th/7th century or later) archaeological sites in Fulbari upazila: Purba Bajitpur, Saraswatipur, Srikrisnapur, Pukuri, Narayan Madhab, Jujhapura Sahara, Jayanti, Chintamon-Rahmatpur, Amra, Barai Chhay Pukur, Choukiapara, Jharkathipara, Chourait, Basudevpur Garh (with associated outlying sites), and Garh Govinda/Fulbari Garh. All 15 sites are located on fluvial terrace, as opposed to floodplain. By far the largest of these sites is Pukuri, with an area of 476.6 hectares; it is even larger than Mahasthangarh and may represent a semi-urban settlement. It was located on the east bank of the now-dry Gukshi Khari river, also called the Kalidaha Sagar. The neighbouring site of Amra is just to the west of Pukuri, on the other side of this channel, and was probably a minor settlement. The site of Narayan Madhab is just south of Pukuri and has structural remains. Also on the east bank of the old Gukshi Khari were the sites of Choukiapara (the second-largest site, at 237.1 hectares) and Jujhapur Sahara. The site of Srikrisnapur is located in a concave depression that is prone to regular annual flooding, and it consists of three structural mounds, probably representing temples or other religious buildings, that "possibly looked like small islands during the flooding period".

== See also ==
- Districts of Bangladesh, Dinajpur
- Divisions of Bangladesh, Rangpur
