= Mohammad Shamshad Ali =

Pakistani physician and martyr

- Born: 9 March 1934; Alahabad, Mihar
- Died: 8 April 1971 (aged 37)
- Known for: Martyr during the Bangladesh Liberation War

Mohammad Shamshad Ali was a Bangladeshi physician who was killed in the Bangladesh Liberation War, and is considered a martyr in Bangladesh.

== Early life ==
Ali was born in his maternal home in Allahabad, Bihar on 9 March 1934. His father, Abul Hossain, was a doctor and a captain in the British Indian Army. His ancestral paternal home was in Sonatala, Bogra District. Ali studied in Rajshahi Medical College and then at Sir Salimullah Medical College, finishing his MBBS in 1963.

== Career ==
In 1963, Ali joined the Pakistani government's medical service. He was posted in Thana Health Complex in Comilla, where he worked for two years. After that, he resigned and opened a private practice in Parbatipur with his own pharmacy. The area was majority Bihari and was the site of frequent conflict between them and Bengalis. He supported the 1969 uprising in East Pakistan.

== Death ==
On 8 April 1971, Pakistan Army accompanied by Biharis raided his house and abducted him. He was taken to the suburbs of the town and shot dead. His body was chopped up and burnt in a rail engine at the local rail station. A road in Parbatipur has been renamed as Shaheed Dr Shamshad Ali Road. On 14 December 2000, Bangladesh Post Office issued commemorative posts in his name on the occasion of Martyred Intellectuals Day.
