= Moner Sathe Juddho =

- Directed by: Ahmed Nasir
- Screenplay by: Manna; Mohammed Rofiquzzaman; Ahmed Nasir
- Produced by: Manna
- Starring: Manna; Purnima; Bapparaj; Kazi Hayat
- Production company: Kritanjali Films
- Release date: 14 October 2007
- Country: Bangladesh
- Language: Bengali

Moner Sathe Juddho is a 2007 Bangladeshi drama film. The film was produced by Manna under the banner of Kritanjali Films. It was directed by Ahmed Nasir. It stars Manna, Purnima, Bapparaj and Kazi Hayat in the lead roles. (Note: multiple sources:) The film was released in Bangladesh on October 14, 2007. The film was a commercial success upon its release. The film won the Bachsas Awards in the category of Best Actor, winning a maximum of three awards at the 29th Bachsas Awards.

== Cast ==
- Manna
- Purnima
- Bapparaj
- Kazi Hayat
- Sujata
- Nasir Khan

== Music ==
Mahfuz Anam James has sung the song for the film. James charged 3 lakh taka for the song 'Ashbar Kale Ashlam Eka'.

== Awards ==
| Year | Award | Category | Winner | Result | Ref. |
|---|---|---|---|---|---|
| 2007 | Bachsas Awards | Best Actor | Manna | Won | |
| 2007 | Bachsas Awards | Best Supporting Actor | Bapparaj | Won | |
| 2007 | Bachsas Awards | Best Singer (Male) | James | Won | |
