= AZM Rezwanul Haque =

Bangladeshi politician

- এ জেড এম রেজওয়ানুল হক

Member of Parliament
- Incumbent
- Assumed office 17 February 2026
- Preceded by: Mostafizur Rahman Fizar
- Constituency: Dinajpur-5
- In office 15 February 1996 – 12 June 1996
- Preceded by: Mostafizur Rahman Fizar
- Succeeded by: Mostafizur Rahman
- Constituency: Dinajpur-5

Personal details
- Born: Dinajpur District
- Party: Independent
- Other political affiliations: Bangladesh Nationalist Party

AZM Rezwanul Haque is an independent Bangladeshi politician from Dinajpur-5 elected a member of parliament in the 2026 Bangladeshi general election. Previously, he was elected for the Bangladesh Nationalist Party from Dinajpur-5 in February 1996.

== Career ==
Haque joined the BNP in 1995. He was elected to parliament from Dinajpur-5 as a Bangladesh Nationalist Party (BNP) candidate in the 15 February 1996 Bangladeshi general election. He was defeated from Dinajpur-5 constituency on 1991, 12 June 1996, 2001, 2008 and 2018 on the nomination of Bangladesh Nationalist Party. He is the convener of Dinajpur district BNP.
