= Natta Company =

Bengali folk theatre troupe

Natta Company is a folk theatre troupe from Bengal established in 1869.

In 1869, Baikuntha Natta inspired by his younger brother, Srinath Natta, came up with his venture in the entertainment industry. He named his group "Machrang Baikuntha Sangeet Samaj". The local people used to call the group – "Natta-der Dal" (translated Natta's group). As time passed by the name "Natta Company" became a well known name in Bengal’s folk theatre and then in stage theatre. In the early years the group used to perform in different Zamindar’s (landlord’s) palaces. As time passed on they started to perform in different villages, small towns and also in cities like Kolkata (Calcutta). The responsibilities came in the hands of Baikuntha Natta’s descendants – Mathuranath Natta and then Jagendranath and Radhendranath Natta. Natta Company is being managed by Sri Makhan Lal Natta, a man in his late 70s.
