= LAMB Hospital, Bangladesh =

Hospital in Bangladesh

Coordinates: 25.6617°N 88.8841°E

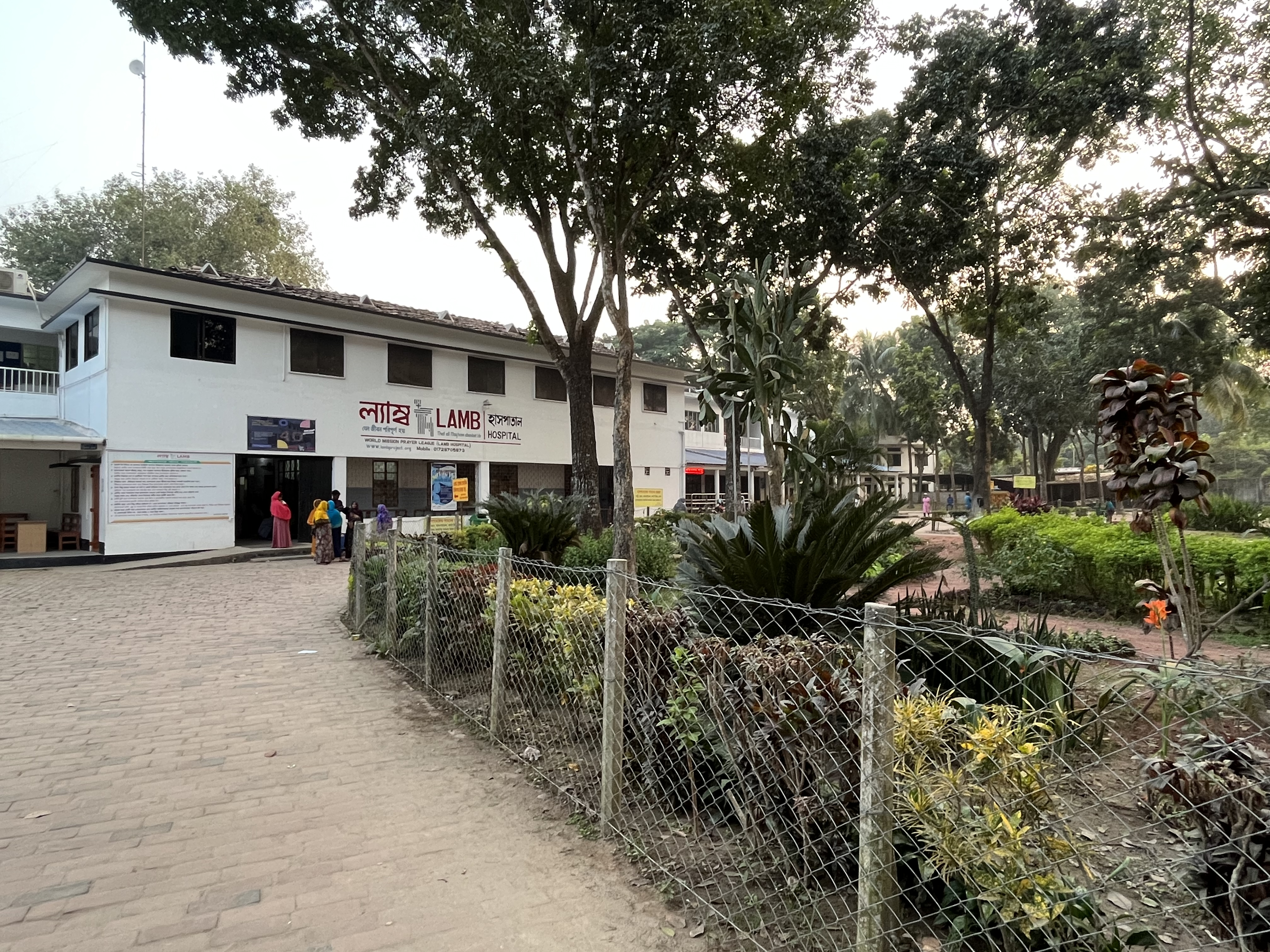
Exterior view

LAMB Hospital is a 150-bed general hospital located in Dinajpur District of Bangladesh. The hospital was opened in 1983 and since then it is providing health care for the neighboring community especially the poor. LAMB Hospital is run by Lutheran Aid to Medicine in Bangladesh, an NGO of the American Santal Mission in Dinajpur. The hospital also established a low-cost telemedicine system with the help of The Swinfen Charitable Trust apart from diagnostic, general health care and acute care services.

== History ==
The foundation of LAMB Hospital was envisioned in the mid-1950s by Rev. John Ottesen, who was a missionary of the American Santal Mission in Dinajpur. Subsequently, a prayer group in Los Angeles developed the idea of having a hospital for providing tertiary, secondary and primary health services to the neighboring community. In 1979, LAMB Community Health and Development Program (LAMB CHDP) was started.

== Location ==
LAMB Hospital is located in Dinajpur District of Bangladesh, approximately 320 kilometres (200 mi) from Dhaka by road. The hospital is about 30 kilometres (19 mi) east of Dinajpur City and 40 kilometres (25 mi) west of Rangpur City. The nearest town is Parbatipur, which is about 2 kilometres (1.2 mi) to the east.

== LAMB English Medium School ==
In order to compete with big city employers for staff, the LAMB Project set up a school offering free education for children of hospital employees.
