= Mainus Sultan =

Mainus Sultan is a Bangladeshi author and academic. He was born in 1956 in Fulbari, Sylhet. He completed a bachelor's degree from the University of Dhaka. He married Hollyn Green. Their daughter, Kajori Sultan, was born in 1994. He and Green worked in Laos from 1995 through 1999 with Quaker Service Laos, a branch of the American Friends Service Committee. Sultan's research there became the basis for his doctoral thesis, entitled "The process of collaborative capacity building: The journey towards achieving self-management for local INGO staff in the Lao PDR". He submitted it to the University of Massachusetts in May 2003 and received the degree of Doctor of Education.

Sultan was a visiting professor at University of Massachusetts Amherst. In 2014, he and his wife moved to Sierra Leone, where she became the head of public affairs for the US embassy in Freetown. Sultan received a Bangla Academy Award, the highest literary award of Bangladesh, in 2015 for his travel writing.
