= Prem Geet (1993 film) =

Bangladeshi romantic drama film

- Poster
- Directed by: Delwar Jahan Jhantu
- Screenplay by: Delwar Jahan Jhantu
- Story by: Delwar Jahan Jhantu
- Starring: Bapparaj; Omar Sani; Lima
- Cinematography: Zakir Hossain
- Edited by: Dildar Hasan
- Music by: Anwar Jahan Nantu
- Production company: SD Productions
- Distributed by: SD Productions
- Release date: 19 November 1993
- Country: Bangladesh
- Language: Bengali
- Budget: est.৳20 lakh (US$16,000)

Prem Geet is a 1993 Bangladeshi romantic drama film directed by Delwar Jahan Jhantu. The film was produced and distributed by SD Productions. It stars Bapparaj, Omar Sani and Lima in the lead roles. It was released in theaters on 19 November 1993 and was a huge commercial success.

== Cast ==
- Bapparaj as Vicky
- Omar Sani as Raju
- Lima as Moyuri
- Dulari
- Dildar
- Gangua as Shakil Mirza
- Abdullah Saki
- Ahmed Sharif as Guest appearance

== Production ==
Although Delwar Jahan Jhantu usually made films in the social and folk genre, he started making romantic films keeping in mind the needs of the audience. In 1981, he named his film after the title of 'Prem Geet', a Bollywood film starring Raj Babbar and Anita Raj, which featured Bappa Raj, Omar Sunny and newcomer Lima in the lead roles.

Although Bapparaj was initially offered the role of Raju in the film, he chose the urban character Vicky. After its release, Omar Sunny's role as the tragic hero was more appreciated.

== Music ==
The film and its songs became very popular in the villages. In particular, the songs 'Sukher Nire Ami Pathhara Pakhi' and 'Amar Surer Sathi Aay Re' composed by music director Anwar Jahan Nantu became very popular and deeply impressed the audience.
