= Shabnaz =

Bangladeshi film actress

- শাবনাজ
- Born: Sabrina Tania
- Occupation: Actress
- Years active: 1991–1996
- Spouse: Nayeem (m. 1994)
- Children: 2
- Mother: Anjuman Nahar
- Relatives: Tahmeena Sultana Mou (sister)

Sabrina Tania (known by her stage name Shabnaz) is a retired Bangladeshi film actress. She won Bangladesh National Film Award for Best Actress for her role in the film Nirmom (1996).

== Background ==
Sabrina Tania was born to Anjuman Nahar (d. 2023). Tania has two younger sisters – actress Tahmeena Sultana Mou is the youngest.

== Career ==
Shabnaz debuted her acting career in the film Chandni, directed by Ehtesham in 1991. With her co-artist, Nayeem, she acted in more than 20 films including Dil, Sonia, Zid, Love, Anutopto, Shakkhat, Takar Ohonkar and Bisher Bashi.

== Personal life ==
Shabnaz married Nayeem on 4 October 1994. They have two daughters, Nameera Naim and Mahdiyah Naim.

== Filmography ==
Year	Films	Role	Notes	Ref.
1991	Chandni	Chandni	Debut film	
1992	Ajker Hangama	Bijli		
1992	Sonia	Sonia		
1992	Chokhe Chokhe	Shahnaz		
1992	Dil	Dil Afroz Chowdhury "Dil"		
1992	Anjali	Anjali		
1993	Zid	Diana		
1993	Love	Asha		
1993	Anutopto	Rupa		
1993	Shakkhat	Lily		
1993	Takar Ahonkar	Tani		
1994	Ful Ar Kata	Laboni		
1994	Agun Jole	Jebonnesa "Jeba"		
1994	Jonom Jonom	Priya Chowdhury		
1994	Bisher Banshi	Shish Nagini / Moina / Meenu		
1995	Rag Anurag	Kuheli / Kakoli	Dual role	
1995	Anjuman	Anjuman		
1995	Asha Valobasha	Dana		
1996	Toposhha	Driti		
1996	Premer Somadhi	Ruksana Begum "Hena"		
1996	Jonotar Shatru	Shabnaz		
1996	Goriber Ostad	Meghla		
1996	Bodsurot	Doctor Sheema		
1996	Nirmom	Rani	Won – Bangladesh National Film Award for Best Actress	
1996	Mayer Odhikar	Disha		
1997	Chiro Shotru	Diana		
1997	Ashar Prodip	Laboni		
1997	Deshodrohi	Shanu		
1997	Ghore Ghore Juddho	Rina		
1998	Protisruti	Rupa		
1999	Ekti Shongsharer Golpo	Priya		
2007	Doctor Bari	Trishna		

=== Television ===
Year	Title	Role	Notes	Ref.
2005–2006	Kach Ghar	Kashfiya Jahan Khan	Serial on Boishakhi TV	
2007	Prottaborton	Shabnaz	Telefilm	
