= Mohammad Shoaib (Bangladeshi politician) =

Bangladeshi politician

- মোহাম্মদ সোয়াইব

Member of Parliament from Dinajpur-5
- In office 1988–1990
- Preceded by: Mostafizur Rahman Fizar
- Succeeded by: Mostafizur Rahman Fizar

Personal details
- Born: Dinajpur District
- Died: 5 June 2022
- Party: Jatiya Party

Mohammad Shoaib is a politician from the Dinajpur District of Bangladesh and an elected a member of parliament from Dinajpur-5.

== Career ==
Shoaib was elected to parliament from Dinajpur-5 as an independent candidate in 1988.
