= Shabana (actress) =

Bangladeshi actress (born 1952)

- শাবানা
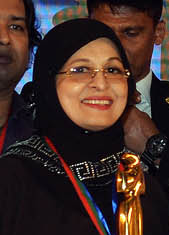
- Shabana in 2017
- Born: Afroza Sultana Ratna; 15 June 1952 (age 74); Raozan, Chittagong, East Bengal, Pakistan
- Occupations: Film actress, producer
- Years active: 1962–1998
- Spouse: Wahid Sadique (m. 1973)
- Awards: Bangladesh National Film Awards (10 times)

Afroza Sultana Ratna (born 15 June 1952), known professionally as Shabana, is a retired Bangladeshi film actress. She was among the highest-paid actresses in post-independence Bangladesh. Over a career of about three decades, she appeared in 299 films, 130 of them opposite of the actor Alamgir.

She began acting as a child in the 1961 film Notun Sur and rose to prominence in the 1980s. She won the Bangladesh National Film Award for Best Actress a record eight times, for Janani (1977), Sokhi Tumi Kar (1980), Dui Poisar Alta (1982), Nazma (1983), Bhat De (1984), Apeksha (1987), Ranga Bhabi (1989), Moroner Pore (1990) and Achena (1991). In July 2017, the Government of Bangladesh presented her with a Lifetime Achievement Award for her contribution to Bangladeshi cinema.

== Early life and career ==
Shabana's family has originated in Dabua, Raozan area in Chittagong. She started her acting career co-starring with Pakistani actor Nadeem in Urdu film Chakori in 1967. She acted in 299 films in Bengali and Urdu, and one in Hindi titled Shatru where she starred with Indian actor Rajesh Khanna in 1986. The film was directed by Pramod Chakravorty. She acted with Nadeem, Razzak, Bulbul Ahmed, Prabir Mitra, Shawkat Akbar, Subhash Dutta, Rahman, Syed Hasan Imam, Ujjal, Zafar Iqbal, Alamgir, Jashim, ATM Shamsuzzaman, Khasru, Sohel Rana, Mahmud Koli, Ilyas Kanchan, Wasim (actor), Humayun Faridi, Javed Sheikh and Rajesh Khanna.

=== Shabana-Nadeem pair ===
Shabana first acted with Pakistani film actor Nadeem in her debut Urdu film Chakori in 1967. Her performances in the films Anari, Chotey Sahab, Chand aur Chandni and Chand Suraj, an experimental film with the first half devoted to the relationship between Waheed Murad and Rozina and the unconnected second half focused on Shabana and Nadeem, received international critical acclaim.

She resurfaced in Pakistani movies during the 1980s, when co-productions among South Asian countries became popular, including roles in Basera (1984) and Aandhi (1991), both co-starring Nadeem. She also starred in the Pakistan-Turkey co-production Halchal with Javed Sheikh in 1986.

== Personal life ==
Shabana retired from acting in 1998 and immigrated to the United States to live with her family. She has been married to Bangladeshi film producer Wahid Sadique since 1973. They have two daughters and one son. Her daughter graduated from Yale and attended Harvard University for her doctoral work. Her son works in finance.
