= Delwar Jahan Jhantu =

Bangladeshi filmmaker

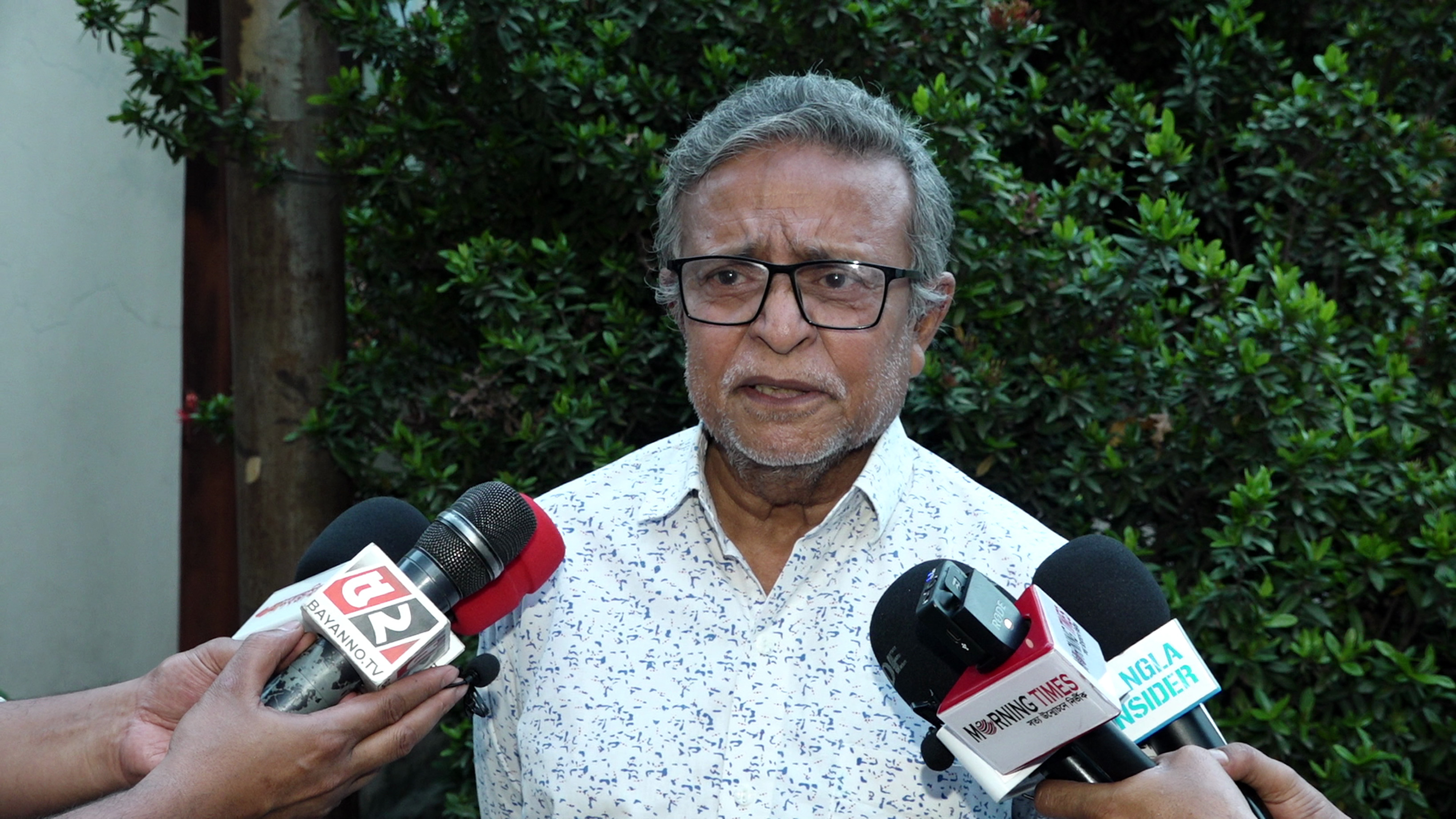
- Born: 1948 (age 77–78); Brahmanbaria, Chattogram
- Other name: Jhantu
- Education: Pak-German Technical Institute
- Occupations: director, producer, screenwriter, story-writer
- Years active: 1978–present
- Style: Folk, mythic, science fiction
- Relatives: Sarowar Jahan (brother)

Delwar Jahan Jhantu (Bengali: দেলোয়ার জাহান ঝন্টু) is a Bangladeshi film director, producer, lyricist, composer, screenwriter, story-writer, Film editor, cinematographer, music director and a freedom fighter.

== Career ==
Delwar Jahan Jhantu made his directorial debut with the film Leader, he also produced it. His first directorial released was Bonduk, and it was released in 1978. As of 5 July 2024 he has directed 81 films in more than four decades of his career, which is the highest directorial venture of any single director in Bangladeshi film, and has written screenplays for more than 350 films. He has also produced 26 films. He won the National Film Awards as Best screenplay for the film Goriber Raja.

== Films ==
1. Bonduk (1978)
2. Leader
3. Omar Sharif (1980)
4. Selim Javed (1981)
5. Al Helal (1982)
6. Nagrani (1983)
7. Mohal (1984)
8. Jhinuk Mala (1985)
9. Mujahid (1985)
10. Matir Koley (1986)
11. Shashi Punnu (1987)
12. Shukh Shanti (1987)
13. Hati Amar Sathi (1987)
14. Poribar (1987)
15. Amor (1988)
16. Kohinoor (1988)
17. Bhai Amar Bhai (1988)
18. Ghor Bari (1989)
19. Shimul Parul (1990)
20. Jadrel Bou (1990)
21. Dukhini Ma (1990)
22. Palki (1990)
23. Stirir Swapno (1991)
24. Nache Nagin (1991)
25. Nisshartha (1991)
26. Bhabir Songshar (1991)
27. Rupashi Nagin (1992)
28. Shukh Shanti Naginir Prem (1992)
29. Shanti Oshanti (1992)
30. Goriber Bandhu (1992)
31. Bhaier Ador (1993)
32. Ruper Rani Ganer Raja (1993)
33. Sotto Badi (1993)
34. Nach Nagina Nach (1993)
35. Jalimer Dushmon (1993)
36. Prem Geet (1993)
37. Judge Barrister (1994)
38. Dakat (1994)
39. Deshi Rangbaz (1994)
40. Konya Dan (1995)
41. Chakrani (1995)
42. Buker Dhon (1995)
43. Deshi Rangbazz (1995)
44. Raag Anuraag (1995)
45. Bir Bahadur (1995)
46. Harano Prem (1996)
47. Bagha Baghini (1996)
48. Goriber Songshar (1996)
49. Fashir Ashami (1996)
50. Bish Bochor Por (1997)
51. Five Rifles (1997)
52. Nil Sagorer Tirey (1997)
53. Prem (1997)
54. Jol Dosshu (1997)
55. Raja Bangladeshi (1998)
56. Goriber Raja Robin Hood (1999)
57. Bishe Bhora Nagin (2000)
58. Dui Nagin (2001)
59. Baap Betir Judho (2001)
60. Bir Soinik (2003)
61. Bizli Toofan (2004)
62. Circus Konya (2004)
63. Nach Ruposhi (2005)
64. Bokul Phooler Mala (2006)
65. Sobai To Bhalobasha Chay (2009)
66. Sathi Hara Nagin (2011)
67. Headmaster (2014)
68. Epar Opar (2015)
69. Akash Mahal (2019)
70. Tumi Acho Tumi Nei (2021)
71. Sujon Majhi (2023)
72. Bou†

=== story, screenplay, dialogue and lyrics ===
- Moheshkhalir Bakhe (1978) – (story and lyricist)
- Shishnaag (1979) – (story)
- Shobuj Sathi (1122) – (story)
- Nazma (1983) – (story)
- Laily Majnu (1983) – (lyricist)
- Sokal-Sondha (1984) – story
- Jadu Nogor – (story)
- Protihingsha – (story and dialogue)
- Alif Laila: Aladiner Aschorjo Prodip – (story, screenplay, dialogue, lyrics)
- Nishpap (1986) – (story, screenplay)
- Obodan (1988) – (story)
- Bouma (1989) – (story)
- Bhaijaan (1989) – (story, screenplay)
- Dhon Rotno (1990) – (story and screenplay)
- Mayer Doa (1990) – (story)
- Nache Nagin (1981) – (story)
- Mayer Ashirbaad (1993) – (story)
- Nag Naginir Prem (1993) – (story)
- Prem Geet (1993) – (story, screenplay, dialogue, lyricist)
- Kanyadan (1995) – (story, screenplay, dialogue, lyrics)
- Boner Raja Tarzan (1995) – (story)
- Jhinuk Mala (1996) – (story)
- Nishthur (1996) – (story, screenplay, dialogue and lyrics)
- Five Rifles (1997) – (story, screenplay, dialogue, lyricist)
- Gotiber Ostad (1997) – (story, screenplay)
- Shoktir Lorai (1997) – (story, screenplay, dialogue)
- Sobar Upore Maa (1997) – (story)
- Shimul Parul (1998) – (story)
- Gariber Samman (1999) – (story)
- Shotru Dhongsho (1999) – (story)
- Bou Shashurir Juddho (2003) – (story)
- Bir Soinik (2003) – (story, dialogue, screenplay)
- Action Lady (2005) – (lyricist)
- Bidrohi Salahuddin (2006) – (story)
- Bakul Phuler Mala (2007) – (screenplay, dialogue)
- Banglar King Kong (2010) – (story)
- Judge Barrister Police Commissioner (2013) – (story)
- Shiri Forhad (2013) – (story)
