= Mohiuddin Faroque =

Bangladeshi art director (1942–2020)

- মহিউদ্দীন ফারুক
- Born: 1942 (Note: Most obituaries give 1942. Others give 1941, and one gives 1 January 1944.)
- Died: 17 April 2020 (aged 77–78); Banani, Dhaka, Bangladesh
- Resting place: Mirpur, Dhaka
- Other name: Mohiuddin Faruque
- Education: University of Dhaka
- Occupations: Art director, set designer, film director
- Notable work: Surja Dighal Bari; Padma Nadir Majhi; Dukhai
- Children: 3
- Awards: National Film Award for Best Art Direction (7 times)

Mohiuddin Faroque (Bengali: মহিউদ্দীন ফারুক; 1942 – 17 April 2020), also spelled Mohiuddin Faruque, was a Bangladeshi art director, set designer and film director. He was a set designer at Bangladesh Television and art director on more than 100 films. He won the Bangladesh National Film Award for Best Art Direction seven times between 1977 and 2010. His films include Surja Dighal Bari, Padma Nadir Majhi and Dukhai. He also directed Biraj Bou, an adaptation of a Sarat Chandra Chattopadhyay novel. From 2008 he chaired the Department of Film and Media Studies at Stamford University Bangladesh.

== Early life ==
Faroque was born in 1942 in Dhaka. He studied at the Faculty of Fine Art of the University of Dhaka.

== Career ==
Faroque joined Pakistan Television in 1967 and later worked as a set designer for Bangladesh Television until he retired. Banglapedia credits the design of the BTV logo to Imdad Hossain, with lettering by Mustafa Monwar; other accounts also note contributions from Kamrul Hassan and Faroque.

He began in films as art director of Punam Ki Raat and went on to work with directors including Goutam Ghose, Rajen Tarafdar, Sheikh Niamat Ali and Subhash Dutta. For Tarafdar's India–Bangladesh co-production Palanka (1975) he received an award in Kolkata. In the 1970s he also worked on Lathial (1975), Bosundhora (1977), Subhash Dutta's Dumurer Phool (1978), Sareng Bou (1978) and Surja Dighal Bari (1979).

Later films included Rajlokkhi Srikanto (1987), Pita Mata Santan (1991), Padma Nadir Majhi (1993), Meghla Akash (2001) and Obujh Bou (2010). For Morshedul Islam he was art director on Dipu Number 2 and Dukhai (1997), building a set at Kuakata for the natural disaster in Dukhai. Islam considered him one of the best art directors in Bangladesh. Ghose's co-production Moner Manush was the last film he worked on.

Faroque directed Biraj Bou, based on a Sarat Chandra novel. He was a member of the Film Directors' Guild at the Bangladesh Film Development Corporation and sat on the jury for the 2014 National Film Awards.

After retiring from BTV, he became chair of the Department of Film and Media Studies at Stamford University Bangladesh in 2008. He also taught at the Bangladesh Cinema and Television Institute.

== Death ==
Faroque had a long-standing heart condition and had been fitted with a stent about six years before his death. In April 2020, during the COVID-19 pandemic, he developed a fever and isolated himself from his family at his home in Banani, Dhaka. On 17 April he was found unconscious and was declared dead at hospital, aged 78. Samples were taken for COVID-19 testing because of his symptoms. He was buried in Mirpur and was survived by his wife, two sons and a daughter.

== Awards ==
Faroque received the Bangladesh National Film Award for Best Art Direction seven times, from Bosundhora in 1977 to Obujh Bou in 2010.

| Year | Award | Category | Film | Result |
|---|---|---|---|---|
| 1977 | National Film Awards | Best Art Direction | Bosundhora | Won |
| 1978 | National Film Awards | Best Art Direction | Dumurer Phool | Won |
| 1991 | National Film Awards | Best Art Direction | Pita Mata Santan | Won |
| 1993 | National Film Awards | Best Art Direction | Padma Nadir Majhi | Won |
| 1997 | National Film Awards | Best Art Direction | Dukhai | Won |
| 2001 | National Film Awards | Best Art Direction | Meghla Akash | Won |
| 2010 | National Film Awards | Best Art Direction | Obujh Bou | Won |

== Selected filmography ==
Films on which Faroque was art director include:

- Punam Ki Raat
- Palanka (1975)
- Lathial (1975)
- Bosundhora (1977)
- Dumurer Phool (1978)
- Sareng Bou (1978)
- Surja Dighal Bari (1979)
- Rajlokkhi Srikanto (1987)
- Pita Mata Santan (1991)
- Padma Nadir Majhi (1993)
- Chaka (1993)
- Dipu Number 2
- Dukhai (1997)
- Meghla Akash (2001)
- Obujh Bou (2010)
- Moner Manush
- Mintu Amar Nam
- Protigga
- Nazma
- Sohag Milon
- Champa Danger Bou
- Johnny
- Nosib
- Uchhila
