= Narendranath Mitra =

Indian writer and poet (1916–1975)

- Born: 30 January 1916; Sadardi, Faridpur, Bengal Presidency, British India (now in Bangladesh)
- Died: 14 September 1975 (aged 59); Calcutta, West Bengal, India
- Citizenship: Indian
- Education: Bangabasi College, University of Calcutta
- Occupations: Writer, Journalist and novelist
- Writing career
- Language: Bengali
- Notable work: Chenamahal

Narendranath Mitra (30 January 1916 – 14 September 1975) was an Indian writer and poet, best known for his short stories in the Bengali-language. Several of his works have been adapted into films, such as Mahanagar directed by Satyajit Ray.

== Biography ==
Narendranath Mitra was born in Sadardi village, Faridpur, Bengal Presidency (in modern-day Bangladesh). His father was a lawyer's clerk. His mother died when he was very young and he was brought up by his stepmother. He was based in Kolkata, now in India at the time of partition in 1947, and chose to remain in India when his birthplace fell to the share of East Pakistan.

In 1933, he passed S. S. C. Level from Vanga High School obtaining first division marks. After doing his I. A. from Rajendra College, Faridpur, he went to Calcutta for further studies. He completed his B.A. from Bangabasi College, of the University of Calcutta.

He found employment at the Dum Dum ordnance factory in Kolkata during the Second World War. After that, he joined Kolkata National Bank. Later, his family was living in Kolkata.

He was a journalist, editor; worked for 'Krishok', 'Swaraj' 'Satyajug'. From 1951 until his death in 1975, he was with Anandabazar Patrika.

== Works adaptations ==
His story Abataranika was adapted into Mahanagar (The Big City) by Satyajit Ray in 1964, with Madhabi Mukherjee as lead. Ras(রস) was adapted into the Hindi film, Saudagar (1973), by Sudhendu Roy, starring Amitabh Bachchan and Nutan;it was selected as the Indian entry for the Best Foreign Language Film at the 46th Academy Awards, but didn't receive a nomination. and a Bangladeshi film Poush Maser Pirit by Nargis Akhter, starring Ahmed Rubel and Sadika Parvin Popy. In 1970, Bengali film Bilambita Lay and in 1975 Palanka were released based on his short story. 1988 Bengali film, Phera by Buddhadeb Dasgupta, was also adapted from his story.

== Bibliography ==
- Deeppunjo
- Osomotol
- Holde Bari
- Dehomon
- Durvashini
- Rupmonjori
- Ultoroth
- Sukh Dukher Dheu
- Suklapakhya
- Chenamahal
- Chorai Utrai
- Okhore Okhore
- Jatrapath
- Misrarag
- Headmaster
- Mohanagar
- Chilekotha
- Shandhyarag
- Surjasakkhi
- Sreshtha Golpo
- Tin Din Tin Ratri
- Suryasakshi
- Godhuli
- Chhatri
- Debjan
- Bilambitalay
