= Poush Maser Pirit =

- Movie poster
- Directed by: Nargis Akhter
- Starring: Sadika Parvin Popy, Priyanka, Ahmed Rubel
- Production company: Femcom Bangladesh
- Release date: 2 September 2016
- Country: Bangladesh
- Language: Bengali

Poush Maser Pirit (Love of Winter) is a Bengali romantic drama film directed by Nargis Akhter based on Narendranath Mitra's short story Rosh. This film was released on 2 September 2016 under the banner of Femcom Bangladesh in Bangladesh. In 1973, a Bollywood film Saudagar was made by Sudhendu Roy, based on the same story.

== Cast ==
- Sadika Parvin Popy as Majhu Khatun
- Ahmed Rubel as Rejjak
- Tony Dias as Motaleb
- Priyanka as Fuljan
- Taru Mostafa as Wahed
- Aminur Rahman Bachchu
- Aditya Alam as Surat Ali
- Habibur Rahman Modhu as Kamar
