= Bangladesh National Film Award for Best Art Direction =

Bangladesh National Film Awards
- Awarded for: Excellence in cinematic achievements for Bangladeshi cinema
- Location: Dhaka
- Country: Bangladesh
- Presented by: Government of Bangladesh
- First award: 1975
- Website: www.moi.gov.bd

Bangladesh National Film Award for Best Art Director (Bengali: জাতীয় চলচ্চিত্র পুরস্কার) is the highest award for art directors in Bangladesh.

== List of winners ==
Year	Winner(s)	Film
1975	No Award	
1976	No Award	
1977	Mohiuddin Faroque	Bosundhora
1978	Mohiuddin Faroque	Dumurer Phool
1979	Abdus Sobur	Aradhana
1980	No Award	
1981	No Award	
1982	No Award	
1983	Anjan Bhowmick	Bhat De
1984	No Award	
1985	Sheikh Niamat Ali	Dahan
1986	Abdus Sobur	Surjogrohon
1987	Sharifuddin Bhuiyan	Harano Sur
1988	Abdul Khalek	Agaman
1989	Abdus Sobur	The Affliction of Estrangement
1990	Abdus Sobur	Surjogrohon
1991	Mohiuddin Faroque	Pita Mata Santan
1992	Bijoy Sen	Andha Biswas
1993	Mohiuddin Faroque	Padma Nadir Majhi
1994	Abdus Sobur	Ghatak
1995	Uttam Guho	Anya Jibon
1996	No Award	
1997	Mohiuddin Faroque	Dukhai
1998	No Award	
1999	Uttam Guho	Chitra Nodir Pare
2000	Tarun Ghosh	Kittonkhola
2001	Mohiuddin Faroque	Meghla Akash
2002	Uttam Guho	Hason Raja
2003	Mohammad Kalantor	Dui Bodhu Ek Swami
2004	Uttam Guho	Lalon
2005	Mohammad Kalantor	Hajar Bachhor Dhore
2006	No Award	
2007	No Award	
2008	Mohammad Kalantor	Megher Kole Rod
2009	Mohammad Kalantor	Gangajatra
2010	Mohiuddin Faroque	Obujh Bou
2011	Animesh Aich	Guerrilla
2012	Uttam Guho and Mohammad Kalantor	Raja Surja Khan
2013	Uttam Guho	Mrittika Maya
2014	Samurai Maruf	Taarkata
2015	Samurai Maruf	Zero Degree
2016	Uttam Guho	Shankhachil
2017	Uttam Guho	Gohin Baluchor
2018	Uttam Guho	Ekti Cinemar Golpo
2019	Rahmatullah Basu; Farid Ahmed	Moner Moto Manush Pailam Na
2020	Uttam Guho	The Grave (2020 film)
2021	Shihab Nurun Nabi	Nonajoler Kabbo
2022	Himadri Barua	Rohingya

=== Multiple wins and nominations ===
The following individuals received two or more awards:

Wins	Art Director
9	Uttam Guho
7	Mohiuddin Faroque
5	Mohammad Kalantor
5	Abdus Sobur
2	Samurai Maruf

== See also ==
- Bachsas Awards
- Meril Prothom Alo Awards
- Ifad Film Club Award
- Babisas Award
