= Mohammad Kalantor =

Bangladeshi art director

- মোহাম্মাদ কালান্তর
- Occupations: Art director, production designer and actor
- Years active: 2003–present
- Notable work: Hajar Bachhor Dhore; Megher Koley Rod; Gangajatra
- Awards: National Film Award (5th times)

Mohammad Kalantor is a Bangladeshi art director. He won Bangladesh National Film Award for Best Art Direction five times for the films Dui Bodhu Ek Swami (2003), Hajar Bachhor Dhore (2005), Megher Koley Rod (2008), Gangajatra (2009), and Raja Surja Khan (2012).

== Selected films ==
- Dui Bodhu Ek Swami (2003)
- Dui Noyoner Alo (2005)
- Hajar Bachhor Dhore (2005)
- Ek Takar Bou (2008)
- Megher Koley Rod (2008)
- Gangajatra (2009)
- Raja Surja Khan (2012)

== Awards and nominations ==
National Film Awards

Year	Award	Category	Film	Result
2003	National Film Award	Best Art Direction	Dui Bodhu Ek Swami	Won
2005	National Film Award	Best Art Direction	Hajar Bachhor Dhore	Won
2008	National Film Award	Best Art Direction	Megher Koley Rod	Won
2009	National Film Award	Best Art Direction	Gangajatra	Won
2012	National Film Award	Best Art Direction	Raja Surja Kha	Won
