= Chitralekha Guho =

Bangladeshi actress

- চিত্রলেখা গুহ
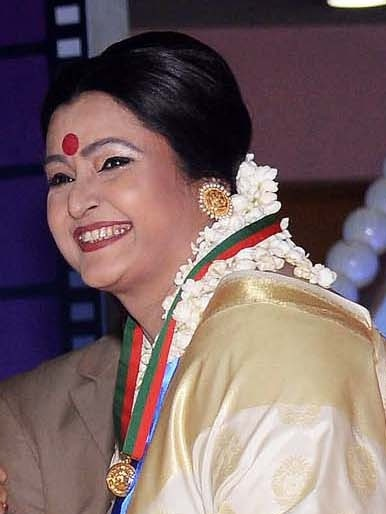
- Chitralekha Guho in 2016.
- Occupation: Actress
- Years active: 1986–present
- Spouse: Uttam Guho
- Children: 2

Chitralekha Guho is a Bangladeshi television, stage and film actress. She was awarded Bangladesh National Film Award for Best Supporting Actress for her role in the film '71 Er Maa Jononi (2014).

== Career ==
Guho debuted her acting career in 1986 by her role in the play Abbhontorin Kheladhula.

== Filmography ==
Year	Title	Role	Director	Notes
1995	Onno Jibon		Sheikh Niamat Ali	
1997	Shopner Nayok	Rebecca	Nasir Khan	
2011	Aloshpur	Chanchal Chowdhury	Al Hazen	
2000	Uttarer Khep		Shahjahan Chowdhury	
2001	Lalsalu	Khalek's Wife	Tanvir Mokammel	
2004	Lalon		Tanvir Mokammel	
2005	Molla Barir Bou	Boistami	Salauddin Lavlu	
2008	Rabeya		Tanvir Mokammel	
2011	Khondo Golpo 1971		Badrul Anam Soud	
2012	Common Gender		Noman Robin	
2014	'71 Er Maa Jononi	Hashem's Mother	Shah Alam Kiran	
2014	Jibondhuli		Tanvir Mokammel	
2015	Podmo Patar Jol	Mrs. Shahbaz	Tonmoy Tansen	
2020	Rupsha Nodir Banke		Tanvir Mokammel	

=== Television ===
- Tulite Aka Swapno (2007)
- Mem Saheb (2008)
- Chicken Tikka Masala (2010)
- Noashal
- Bideshi Bou (2016)
- Syed Barir Bou (2021)
- Ayna (2021)
- Mashrafe Junior (2021; Present)

== Personal life ==
Guho is married to Uttam Guho, an art director. Together they have two daughters Arnila Guho and Arnisha Guho.
