= Mishu Chowdhury =

Bangladeshi cricketer, sports anchor, actress and umpire

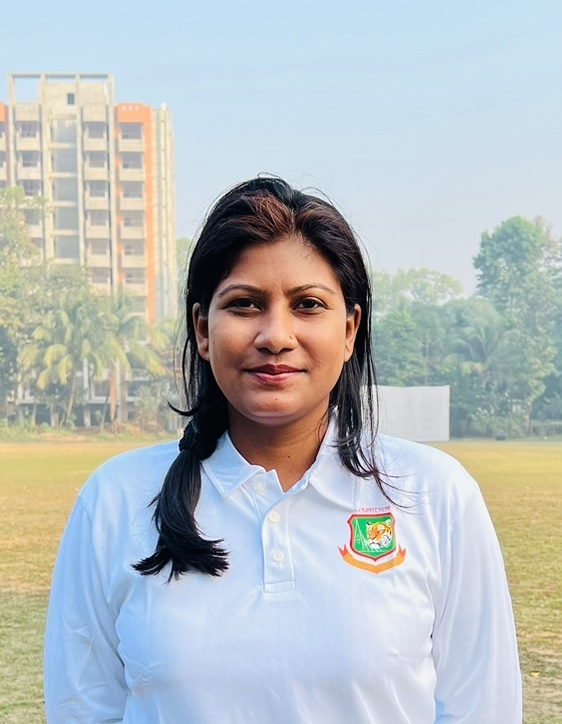
- Born: 3 March 1990 (age 36); Bogra, Bangladesh
- Education: Eden Mohila College, Dhaka
- Occupations: umpire, former cricketer, sports anchor, commentator, television actress, stage performer, model and writer
- Years active: Cricket: 2005-2013; Acting: 2014-present Umpiring: 2022-present

Rokeya Sultana
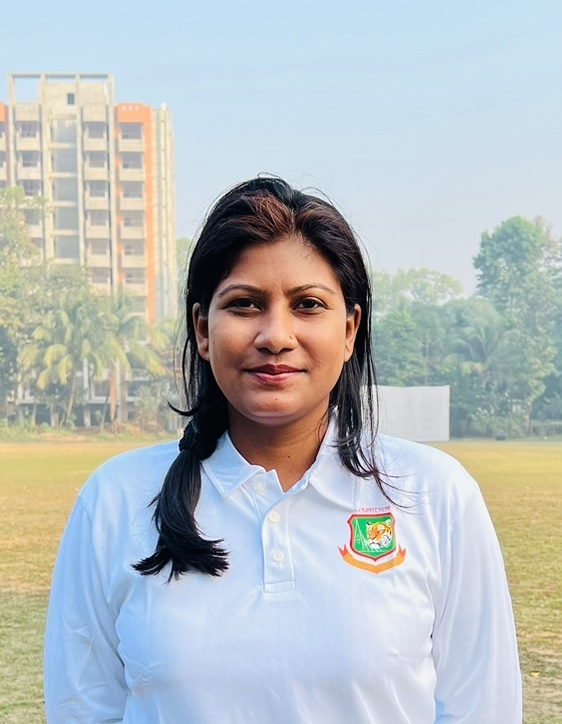

Personal information
- Full name: Rokeya Sultana Mishu Chowdhury
- Nickname: Mishu Chowdhury
- Batting: Right-handed
- Bowling: Right-arm medium
- Role: Umpire

Domestic team information
- Years: Team
- Sylhet Division

Umpiring information
- WT20Is umpired: 11 (2024–2025)
- LA umpired: 1 (2024)
- Source: ESPNcricinfo, 25 April 2024

Rokeya Sultana Mishu Chowdhury (Bengali: রোকেয়া সুলতানা; born 3 March 1990) is a Bangladeshi former cricketer, umpire, sports anchor, and actress. She is also one of the first Bangladeshi women umpires to join the ICC Development Panel. She played in national cricket leagues from 2008 to 2012 but retired due to a ligament injury. Later she took up sports anchoring and acting. She acted in '71 Er Ma Jononi and several other films and numerous TV dramas.

== Career ==
Mishu Chowdhury was born in Bogura. Her original name is Rokeya Sultana and nickname is Mishu Chowdhury. After completion of her intermediate examination, she came to Dhaka for higher studies. She completed her graduation in Accounting from Eden Mohila College, Dhaka, and a second graduation in Mass media & journalism from Stamford University. Mishu started her acting career in Bogra Theatre early in her life. She acted in 5 plays there, the last one being Nuruldiner Sarajibon (2009). She took up stage performance again in 2016 in the play Surgao for Desh Natok.

Mishu joined the Bogra district women's cricket team in 2006. As an all-rounder cricketer, she played in Club Cup for Mohammedan Sporting Club, Azad Sporting Club and Indira Road Krira Chokro; District Cup for Bogra district and Division Cup for Sylhet Division. In 2013 she had to retire from cricket due to a ligament injury. She also played Open Badminton singles & Doubles tournament.

While in her cricket career, Mishu starred in a telefilm Shudhu Tumi in 2012. Later she took on acting professionally with the film '71 Er Ma Jononi. She has acted in 5 films and more than 70 television dramas. She has also acted in several television commercials among which is Grameen phone's Sob Kotha Jomaya Rakh directed by Amitabh Reza Chowdhury. She regularly hosts sports programs as well.

Besides sports and media, Mishu also teaches in an English-medium school. She wrote a book titled Bangladesher Nari Kriketer Ovijatra on the women cricketers of the country.

Mishu got the Best Popular Anchor award and an honorific emblem as an actress by Business File. She was also given the Grameenphone 'Balance for Better' inspiration award in 2019.

Umpiring

On 29 October 2022, Mishu umpired her first match as one of the four first Bangladeshi woman umpires for 3rd Division Men's Cricket League team 2022. She also umpired in New York Bangladesh Cricket League 2023 as the first Bangladeshi women umpire in the USA which earned her an honorary award. Other tournaments she umpired in includes Dhaka First Division Women Cricket League 2023, Dhaka Premier Division Women Cricket League 2023, Dhaka women's First Division Qualifying T-20 Cricket League, Under-14 Men's Cricket League 2023, T-20 Men's Physically Disability Cricket League 2023, and Commonwealth Cricket League 2023. Her debut in international matches was at Women's U19 Tri-Nation T20 Series 2024.

In March 2024, along with 3 other women umpires, Mishu was selected for the ICC Development Panel of Umpires.

== Filmography ==
=== Feature films ===
| Year | Title | Director | Role |
|---|---|---|---|
| 2014 | '71 Er Ma Jononi | Shah Alam Kiran | Jorina |
| 2016 | Maya Nogor | Shanti Chowdhury | Sokhina |
| 2017 | Target | Saif Chandan | Police |
| 2022 | Hudson-er Bonduk | Proshanto Adhikari | Mafia |
| 2022 | Bhangan | Mirza Sakhawat Hossen | Anna |

=== Stage performances ===
| Year | Title | Director | Theatre |
|---|---|---|---|
| 2003 | Amader School | Saiful | Bogura Theatre |
| 2004 | Court Marshal | Toufique Hasan Moyna | Bogura Theatre |
| 2004 | Makorsha | Amirul Islam | Bogura Theatre |
| 2005 | Koiborto Bidroho | Toufique Hasan Moyn | Bogura Theatre |
| 2009 | Nuruldiner Sarajibon | Towfiqul Emon | Bogura Theatre |
| 2016 | Surgao | Masum Reza | Desh Natok |

=== Sporting anchoring ===
| Year | Title | Channel |
|---|---|---|
| 2015 | Bisshokape Bisshomate (ICC World Cup) | Boishakhi TV |
| 2015 | Asian Sports 30 | Asian TV |
| 2016 | Power Play (ICC T-20 World Cup) | Maasranga TV |
| 2016 | We Love Sports | News24 |
| 2017 | Khelar Jogot | ATN Bangla |
| 2018 | FIFA Russia World Cup Football | Channel i |
| 2018 | I-sports | Channel i |
| 2018 | Cricket Extra | GTV |
| 2018 | ICC Asia Cup | Channel i |
| 2019 | ICC World Cup Cricket | Somoy TV |
| 2022 | After Match (ICC T-20 World Cup | Desh TV |
| 2022 | FIFA Qatar World Cup Football | Channel i |
| 2022 | FIFA Qatar World Cup Football | Bangladesh Television |

=== Television commercial ===
| Year | Product | Director |
|---|---|---|
| 2014 | Documentary | Syed Aolad |
| 2014 | Docudrama | Gautum Koiry |
| 2014 | SMC | Gazi Shuvro |
| 2015 | Pran Dairy Milk | Shoraf Ahmed Jibon |
| 2015 | Documentary | Chayanika Chowdhury |
| 2015 | Grameenphone | Amitabh Reza Chowdhury |
| 2016 | IDLC Cook Store | Maksud Hossain |
| 2016 | Jago Foundation | Afzal Hossain |
| 2016 | DBBL | Afzal Hossain |
| 2016 | Saban | Soinik |
| 2017 | Absolute Barbeque | Alamgir Hossen |
| 2018 | Chui Jhal | Ashin |
| 2021 | RFL Gas Stove | Sujan Sarkar |
| 2021 | Grameenphone | Adnan Al Rajeev |

=== Television drama (serial) ===
| Year | Title | Playwright & Director | Aired On |
|---|---|---|---|
| 2015 | DB | Shahiduzzaman Selim | ATN Bangla |
| 2015 | Thanar Nam Shonir Akhra | D.A. Tayeb | RTV |
| 2015 | Mago Tomar Jonno | Mahfuz Ahmed | ATN Bangla |
| 2015 | Chitro Jogot | G M Saikot | Channel i |
| 2015 | Probashe Porobashe | Shakal Ahmed | Channel i |
| 2015 | Jekhane Shopner Desh | Belal Ahmed | Channel i |
| 2015 | Kutum Ashche | S A Hoque Aliq | RTV |
| 2015 | Azimpur Express | Mohammad Anwar | RTV |
| 2015 | Korta Kahini | Aronno Anwar | Bangla Vision |
| 2015 | Shunne Chora Dhill | Shakal Ahmed | Massranga TV |
| 2016 | Jol Foring Er Gaan | Anjan Aich | SATV |
| 2016 | Chandraboti | Anjan Aich | Channel Nine |
| 2016 | Valobasha Kare Koi | Zahangir Alam Shumon | ATN Bangla |
| 2016 | Kheya | Shakal Ahmed | ATN Bangla |
| 2016 | Nari | Mostofa Monon | Massranga TV |
| 2017 | Calling Bell | Imraul Rafat | Desh TV |
| 2017 | Nilambori | Ahsanur Rahman | Massranga TV |
| 2017 | Nil Nagorik | Masud Mohiuddin | Asian TV |
| 2017 | Ekti Adorsholipi | Hasan Morshed | SATV |
| 2017 | Poran Kotha | Amirul Islam Arun | Massranga TV |
| 2017 | Uzan Gaang Er Naiya | Bashar Georgis | ATN Bangla |
| 2017 | Nagor Jonaki | Masud Mohiuddin | Asian TV |
| 2017 | Chitra Bichitra | D.A. Tayeb | ATN Bangla |
| 2017 | Agun Alpona | Matia Banu Shuku | Channel Nine |
| 2017 | Chutki | Shamim Zaman | ATN Bangla |
| 2018 | Golpogulo Amader | Mizanur Rahman Aryan | NTV |
| 2018 | Gramer Naam Shimulpur | Bashar Georgis | Channel i |
| 2019 | Khub Pain A Achi | Mehedi Hasan Mukul | ATN Bangla |
| 2021 | Momotaz Mohol | Shojib Mahmud | Bangla Vision |
| 2021 | Mashrafi Junior | Sazzad Shumon | Deepto TV |

=== Television drama (single) ===
| Year | Title | Playwright & Director | Aired On |
|---|---|---|---|
| 2012 | Vuter Golpo | Ahsan Habib | NTV |
| 2012 | Shudhu Tumi | Noresh Bhuiyan | Banglavision |
| 2014 | Sobai Keno Doctor | Shah Alam Kiran | Channel i |
| 2014 | Otopor Se Kobi | Saiful Islam Mannu | Channel i |
| 2015 | Aporichita | Sumon Anowar | NTV |
| 2015 | Ekti Gopon Kotha Bolbo | Syed Jamil | Massranga TV |
| 2015 | Nil Akashe Kalo Megh | Mohammad Anowar | ATN Bangla |
| 2015 | Sarissrip | Mahfuz Ahmed | Channel i |
| 2015 | Dokholi Sutre Malik | S A Hoque Olik | ATN Bangla |
| 2015 | Chor Na Dakat | Ferdose Hasan | ATN Bangla |
| 2015 | Rong | Ferdose Hasan | RTV |
| 2015 | Modhumoy | Ferdose Hasan | RTV |
| 2016 | Raychoron | Saidul Anam Tutul | SATV |
| 2016 | Shes Theke Shuru | Koushik Sarkar Das | Bangla Vision |
| 2016 | Trajik Life | Sazzad Rabbi | SATV |
| 2016 | Agnimonche Rohomot | Milki Motin | SATV |
| 2016 | Chad R Alo Chorabe Na | Chayanika Chowdhury | Massranga TV |
| 2016 | Tomar Aronno Dine | Ferdose Hasan | SATV |
| 2016 | Zitur Shonshar | Mohammad Noman | ATN Bangla |
| 2016 | Crime Petrol | Rajib Rasul | Channel i |
| 2016 | Onakankhito Sotto | Shuvro Khan | RTV |
| 2017 | Objection Your Honour | Majibul Hoque Khokan | ATN Bangla |
| 2017 | Bkash | Shuvro Khan | RTV |
| 2017 | Formalin Plas | Masud Sezan | Bangla Vision |
| 2017 | Praychistto | Imraul Rafat | Desh TV |
| 2017 | Chayashorir | Rezanur Rahman | Channel i |
| 2017 | Tobuo Akash Nil | Sazzad Shumon | NTV |
| 2017 | Lalu Bulu | Zahir Babu | Channel i |
| 2017 | Ektu Bariye Bola | Mazharul Islam | Channel i |
| 2017 | Hamiliner Bashiwala | Sazzad Shumon | Channel i |
| 2017 | Jege Othar Golpo | Redwan Roni | Massranga TV |
| 2017 | Badsha Sir Er Bibaho | Himel Ishak | BTV |
| 2017 | Commitment | Rashed Raha | NTV |
| 2017 | Probonchok | Rafiqul Hoque | NTV |
| 2017 | Ador | Himel Ishak | BTV |
| 2017 | Jaan | Rajib Rasul | Channel i |
| 2017 | Stationer Ek Raat | Himel Ishak | BTV |
| 2017 | Shokhina | Himel Ishak | BTV |
| 2017 | Arunima Obosheshe | Milton Sarkar | Channel Nine |
| 2017 | Ekrattry | Mazharul Islam | Channel i |
| 2018 | Lux Gala Round Drama | Redwan Roni | Channel i |
| 2019 | 22 Gojer Valobasha | Rezanur Rahman | Channel i |
| 2021 | Amra Amrai 2 | Selim Reza | Channel Nine |
| 2021 | Mukhomukhi | Selim Reza | Channel Nine |
