= Rupsha Nodir Banke =

2020 Bangladeshi film

- Theatrical release poster
- Directed by: Tanvir Mokammel
- Written by: Tanvir Mokammel
- Screenplay by: Tanvir Mokammel
- Story by: Tanvir Mokammel
- Produced by: Sazzad Khan
- Starring: Jahid Hasan Shovon; Khairul Alam Sabuj; Tawsif Saadman Turjo; Ramendu Majumdar; Naziba Bashar; Chitralekha Guho; Jhuna Chowdhury; Afzal Kabir; Razib Salehin
- Cinematography: Mahfuzur Rahman Khan
- Edited by: Mahadev Shi
- Music by: Syed Sabab Ali Arju
- Production company: Kino-Eye Films
- Distributed by: Kino-Eye Films
- Release date: 11 December 2020 (Bangladesh)
- Running time: 137 mins
- Country: Bangladesh
- Language: Bengali
- Budget: ৳96 lakh (equivalent to ৳1.3 crore or US$110,000 in 2024)

Rupsha Nodir Banke (lit. 'Quiet Flows The River Rupsha') is a 2020 Bangladeshi biographical full-length film. This Bangladesh government-funded film is written and directed by Ekushey Padak-winning filmmaker Tanvir Mokammel. The main thrust of the film is the involvement of events in the historical life of a supporter of left-wing politics at different ages. In the political biography of the main character of the film called Manabratan Mukhopadhyay, various historical events that happened in Bangladesh from 1930 to 1971 are presented. Khairul Alam Sabuj, Tawsif Saadman Turjo and Zahid Hasan Sobhan have acted according to the age of Manabratan Mukhopadhyay.

The film's production was crowd-funded in addition to a grant from the Bangladesh government. The production of Quiet Flows The River Rupsha took more than three years. Mahfuzur Rahman Khan's camera captured its scenes in Khulna, Comilla and Old Dhaka Central Jail in Bangladesh. The film began planning in 2016 and finished production in March 2020 with editing.

After a short campaign, Rupsha Nodir Banke was released in four cinemas in Bangladesh on 11 December 2020. Apart from commercial release, the film was screened at international film festivals. It garnered positive reception from critics upon release.

== Plot ==
In this two hour and 17 minute long film, Swadeshi movement, Tebhaga movement, killing of 7 leftists in Rajshahi District Jail on April 24, 1950 and various other notable events from 1930s to 1971 are narrated from the life of Manabratan Mukhopadhyay, a patriotic, ill-fated unmarried leftist leader, who was executed by the Pakistan army supported Razakars during the Bangladesh Liberation War.

Manabratan Mukhopadhyay, the main character of the film, was born in a well-known feudal family in a village named Karnapara on Rupsha river in Khulna District during the British period. Fatherless as a child, he joined the 'Anushilan' Samiti and later leftist movement at a young age. He played an important role in the peasant movement, that's why he became known 'Comrade Manabda' to local people, who respected him as well. He received the title 'Comrade Tagore' from poor Namasudra peasants. He gives more importance to political life than his personal life. During the Partition of British India, the only beloved Urmimala went to the other side of Bengal. Manabda spent a troubled life in the midst of prison-oppression-torture and various struggles during the Pakistan period after the partition of the country by the British government, which tragically ended in 1971 in the liberation war of Bangladesh.

== Cast ==
=== Actors ===
The main character of the story is portrayed by Zahid Hasan Shovon in his middle age, Khairul Alam Sabuj in his old age and Tawsif Saadman Turjo in his young age.

Other roles played by Ramendu Majumdar, Najiba Bashar (as Urmimala), Afzal Kabir, Alok Basu, Baisakhi Ghosh, Chitralekha Guho, Iqbal Ahmed, Mrinal Dutt, Abdullah Rana, Abdus Salim, Achiruddin Milan, Debashish Ghosh, Ibrahim Bidyut, Milli Bashar, Jahangir Hossain, Jhuna Chowdhury, Khandkar Sohan, Rajib Salehin, Masum Bashar, Mehdi Al Amin, Mohsin Shamim, Mahmud Alam, Navkumar Sarkar, Partha Pratim, Pankaj Majumdar, Sangeeta Chowdhury, Sharif Hossain Imon, Shyamal Biswas, Sushil Saha, Swapan Guha; Child artist Hiya, Himu and other acting artists. British actor Andrew Jones acted as a police superintendent.

=== Crew ===
Mahfuzur Rahman Khan filmed Rupsha Nodir Banke. The executive producer was Sazzad Khan, Its editor was Mahadev Shi, Uttam Guho was responsible for the art directoion and he was chief assistant director of the film. Chitralekha Guha acted as costume and casting director; Its assistant director was Rana Masud and Sagir Mostafa, eight persons worked as assistants to Tanvir Mokammel in the film, who were students of Bangladesh Film Institute.

== Production ==
=== Pre-production ===
“Some of them have served 20-25 years in jail during the British and Pakistani eras. I have seen some such old leftist leaders up close. This is the story of one of them. This man was shot dead by the Razakars in 1971.”

—Tanvir Mokammel's interview with Bdnews24.com

Tanvir Mokammel started planning for the construction of Rupsha Nodir Banke before 2016. He based the character 'Manabda' in the screenplay on the real-life left-wing leader of southern Bangladesh, Bishnu Chattopadhyay. In the financial year 2016-2017, the film received a grant of 50 lakh takas from the Ministry of Information of the Government of Bangladesh considering the spirit of Bangladesh's independence and liberation war, human values, tasteful and industrial quality. Ninety six lakh takas were spent on its production. Other than grants, the rest of the money is raised through crowd-funding. It is the seventh feature film directed by Tanvir Mokammel.

=== Filming ===
On 24 February 2018, its shooting began at WAPDA Dam, adjacent to the Jhupzhupia river in Khulna's Batiaghata Upazila. Later, the scenes of the film were shot in the countryside of Phultala Upazila, Daulatpur Railway Station, Comilla and Dhaka. Ten percent shooting of the film was left in 2018. Filming of this film was completed on 29 September 2019 by shooting scenes in Old Dhaka Central Jail. The dubbing and other editing work of the film started from 1 July 2018. Full production of the film was completed in the second week of March 2020.

=== Music ===
Syed Sabab Ali Arju composed the background music of this film. The soundtrack of the film was completed at studio of Chhayanaut in Dhanmondi. Two songs were used in the film. One song is written by Chitralekha Guho and the other song is recorded in the voice of child artist Rishti.

== Release ==
=== Theatrical ===
Rupsha Nodir Banke was released in theaters after a brief campaign. Tanvir Mokammel released the first official trailer of the film on 24 March 2020 for the initial promotion. The film was initially slated to release in December 2019 and later in March 2020. Finally the film was released in four cinemas in Bangladesh on December 11, 2020. The film was released commercially in cinemas as well as on the internet.

=== Screening ===
In 2021, Rupsha Nodir Banke was selected to screen in the "World Panorama" section of the 51st Goa Film Festival and the 16th Kerala Film Festival. Outside the festivals, the film had a special screening at Gorky Sadan in Kolkata on 21 January. On September 23, the film was screened as the opening film of the 4th Toronto International Multicultural Film Festival.

== Reception ==
Rupsha Nodir Banke earned positive reviews from the audience. Two different critics praised the film for its story linking important events in the history of Bangladesh, actors' performances, cinematography, editing and music. Marzia Akhtar of Kaler Kantho described the film as "a unique presentation of Bengali soul-searching and liberation thought". In Bangla Movie Database, Rahman Moti wrote about the film - "This is the best film of 2020". He gave the film an overall rating of 9/10 stars.
