= Swapnabhumi =

Bangladeshi documentary film

- DVD cover
- Bengali: স্বপ্নভূমি
- Directed by: Tanvir Mokammel
- Screenplay by: Tanvir Mokammel
- Produced by: Tanvir Mokammel; Shafiur Rahman
- Narrated by: Chitralekha Guho
- Cinematography: Anwar Hossain
- Edited by: Mahadeb Shi
- Music by: Syed Shabab Ali Arzoo
- Production company: Kino-Eye Films
- Release date: 30 November 2007
- Running time: 90 mins
- Country: Bangladesh
- Language: Bengali

Swapnabhumi (The Promised Land) is a 2007 Bangladeshi documentary film by Tanvir Mokammel. The film tells the plight of Stranded Pakistanis in Bangladesh, who are also identified as Biharis.

== Plot ==
The film highlights the current stateless status of Stranded Pakistanis in Bangladesh, otherwise known as Biharis. The story is of six decades, three countries- India, Pakistan, Bangladesh and statelessness of about more than 150,000 people from the Urdu-speaking community people who originally emigrated from India to Bangladesh. It highlights the violence against Biharis and their despair of not being able to settle in Pakistan, which the Biharis see as a betrayal.

== Music ==
Background score by Syed Shabab Ali Arzoo with sound by Nahid Masud, the film used tracks used before in popular culture.

No.	Title	Lyrics	Music	Singer(s)	Length
1.	"Lagta Nehe Ye Dil Mera"	Bahdur Shah Zafar
2.	"Mujhe Gale Se Laga Lo" (from film Aaj Aur Kal (1963))	Sahir Ludhianvi		Kamal Ahmed
3.	"Berahem Aasman Meri Manzil Bata" (from film Bahana (1960))		Madan Mohan	Talat Mehmood

== Reception ==
The film premiered at the International Documentary Film Festival Amsterdam in 2007. It was screened at the Bahrain International Film Festival in 2009, where it received critical praise. In 2009, the film won second best documentary film award at the Film South Asia Film Festival at Kathmandu.
