= Uttam Guho =

Bangladeshi art director

- উত্তম গুহ
- Born: 30 September
- Occupation: Art director
- Spouse: Chitralekha Guho

Uttam Guho (born 30 September) is a Bangladeshi art director of films and stage plays. He won Bangladesh National Film Award for Best Art Direction a record 10 times for the films Anya Jibon (1995), Chitra Nodir Pare (1999), Hason Raja (2002), Lalon (2004), Raja Surja Khan (2012), Mrittika Maya (2013), Shankhachil (2016), Gohin Baluchor (2017), Ekti Cinemar Golpo (2018) and Gor (The Grave) (2020).

== Personal life ==
Guho is married to actress Chitralekha Guho. Together they have two daughters, Arnisha and Arnila.

== Works ==
=== Stage plays ===
- Sheshrokkha
- Bhuboner Ghate
- Phulrani Aami Tia
- Anya Gazir Anya Kissa

=== Films ===
- Chandragrohon (2008)
- Anya Jibon (1995)
- Chitra Nodir Pare (1999)
- Hason Raja (2002)
- Lalon (2004)
- Raja Surja Khan (2012)
- Mrittika Maya (2013)
- Brihonnola (2014)
- Jibondhuli (2014)
- Shankhachil (2016)
- Gohin Baluchor (2017)
- Ekti Cinemar Golpo (2018)
- Gor (The Grave) (2020)
