= Moyuri =

Bangladeshi actress

- Born: Munmun Akhter; December 6, 1983 (age 42); Rampura, Dhaka, Bangladesh
- Citizenship: Bangladesh
- Occupation: Actress
- Years active: 1998–2007
- Notable work: Char Satiner Ghar, Bir Soinik
- Spouses: Rejaul Karim Milon (m. 2007; died 2015) Safiq Jewel Ahmed (m. 2017)
- Children: Maimuna Saiba Angel (daughter); Shaikh Saad Muhammad Insafh (son)
- Parent: Satu Islam (mother)

Munmum Akhter Liza (better known as Moyuri on stage) (born December 6, 1983) is a Bangladeshi film actress. She made her film debut in 1998 with the film Mrityur Mukhe. Since then, she has acted in about 309 films and she became one of the leading actresses of Bangladesh. Nargis Akhter's movie Char Satiner Ghar based on author Selina Hossain's novel Hridoy O Shramer Sansar playing the role of Khan Shaheb's third wife further enhanced her reputation. Moyuri was praised for her role as the strong character of actor Alamgir's wife.

== Early and personal life ==
Maury's real name is Munmun Akhter Liza. Born on 7 December 1983 in Rampura Dhaka. While in ninth grade, she became involved with the film industry.

She married Rezaul Karim Milon, an upazila vice-chairman, in 2007. They have a daughter named Maimuna Saiba Angel from the marriage. In 2015 her husband died at the age of 45. In 2017, she married a Teacher, named Shafiq Jewel Ahmed. She gave birth to her second child, Sheikh Saad Muhammad Insafh, on 23 February 2019.

== Career ==
In 1997, Maury entered the world of acting through the film Mrityur Mukhe by a producer named Malek Afsari. Then her acting life moved forward very fast. She made a lot of names in one movie after another.

She rose to fame by playing the role of Alamgir's wife in the film Char Satiner Ghar directed by Nargis Akhter.

In her career she was a member of a circus troupe called the New Opera Circus.

== Films ==
- Mrittur Mukhe (1997)
- Moger Mullok (1999)
- Ke Amar Baba (1999)
- Hira Chuni Panna (2000)
- Dujon Dujonar (2000)
- Kukhato Khuni (2000)
- Voyonkor Sontrasi (2001)
- Rongbaz Badshah (2001)
- Dhakaiya Mastan (2002)
- Arman (2002)
- Mastaner Upor Mastan (2002)
- Aghat Palta Aghat (2002)
- Keyamot (2003)
- Hingsha Protihingsha (2003)
- Bir Soinik (2003)
- Kothin Simar (2003)
- Dui Bodhu Ek Shami (2003)
- Bhaier Shotru Bhai (2004 film)
- Char Satiner Ghar (2005)
- Hira Amar Naam (2005)
- Nirapatta Chai (2005)
- Vondo Ojha (2006)
- Tumi Amar Shami (2006)
- Top Samrat
- Bangla Vai
- Palta Hamla
- Lohar Shikol
- Moron Nishan
- Bahadur Sontan
- Juddhe Jabo (2002)
- Kosom Banglar Mati
