= 35th Bangladesh National Film Awards =

National Film Awards, Bangladesh

- Awarded for: Best of bangladeshi cinema in 2010
- Awarded by: President of Bangladesh
- Presented by: Ministry of Information
- Presented on: 3 April 2012
- Site: Bangabandhu International Conference Center, Dhaka, Bangladesh
- Hosted by: Riaz and Moushumi
- Official website: moi.gov.bd

Highlights
- Best Feature Film: Gohine Shobdo
- Best Actor: Shakib Khan; Bhalobaslei Ghor Bandha Jay Na
- Best Actress: Purnima; Ora Amake Bhalo Hote Dilo Na
- Lifetime achievement: Anwar Hossain
- Most awards: Bhalobaslei Ghor Bandha Jay Na (7)

Television coverage
- Channel: BTV

The 35th National Film Awards were presented by the Ministry of Information, Bangladesh, to felicitate the best of Bangladeshi cinema released in the year 2010. The government announced the names of 25 artistes and technicians for the National Film Award 2010 in recognition of their outstanding contributions to the country's film industry. Prime Minister Sheikh Hasina handed over the 'National Film Awards – 2010' to the winners. The government has decided to observe 3 April as National Film Day from this year. The National Film Award 2010 was held at the Bangabandhu International Conference Centre, Dhaka.

== List of winners ==
Awards were given in 25 categories this year.

=== Merit awards ===
Name of Awards	Winner(s)	Film
Best Film	Faridur Reza Sagar (Impress Telefilm Limited)	Gohine Shobdo
Best Director	Khalid Mahmood Mithu	Gohine Shobdo
Best Actor	Shakib Khan	Bhalobaslei Ghor Bandha Jay Na
Best Actress	Purnima	Ora Amake Bhalo Hote Dilo Na
Best Actor in a Supporting Role	MA Alamgir	Jibon Moroner Sathi
Best Actress in a Supporting Role	Rumana Khan	Bhalobaslei Ghor Bandha Jay Na
Best Actor in a Negative Role	Mizu Ahmed	Abujh Bou
Best Actor in a Comic Role	Afzal Sharif	Nisshash Amar Tumi
Best Child Artist	Prarthana Fardin Dighi	Chachchu Amar Chachchu
Best Music Director	Shujeo Shyam	Abujh Bou
Best Music Composer	Sheikh Sadi Khan	Bhalobaslei Ghor Bandha Jay Na
Best Lyrics	Kabir Bakul	Nisshash Amar Tumi
Best Male Playback Singer	S.I. Tutul	Bhalobaslei Ghor Bandha Jay Na
Best Female Playback Singer	Shammi Akhter	Bhalobaslei Ghor Bandha Jay Na

=== Technical awards ===
Name of Awards	Winner(s)	Film
Best Strory	Zakir Hossain Raju	Bhalobaslei Ghor Bandha Jay Na
Best Dialogue	Zakir Hossain Raju	Bhalobaslei Ghor Bandha Jay Na
Best Screenplay	Nargis Akter	Abujh Bou
Best Cinematography	Hasan Ahmed	Gohine Shobdo
Best Choreography	Imdadul Haque Khokon	Mughal-e-Azam
Best Art Direction	Mohiuddin Faruk	Abujh Bou
Best Editing	Mujibur Rahman Dulu	Abujh Bou
Best Sound Recording	Kazi Selim	Gohine Shobdo
Best Costume Design	Bibi Russell	Moner Manush
Best Make-up	Abdur Rahman	Moner Manush

=== Special awards ===
- Lifetime Achievement Award – Anwar Hossain

== Host and performance ==
The award giving ceremony was anchored by Riaz and Moushumi. In the cultural section, a documentary based on Bangladeshi films was shown. Dancers of BTV performed with country songs. Runa Laila, Subir Nandi, Samina Chowdhury, and S I Tutul sang songs afterwards.

== See also ==
- Bachsas Film Awards
- Meril Prothom Alo Awards
- Ifad Film Club Award
- Babisas Award
