= Mahanagar =

- A poster for Mahanagar
- Directed by: Satyajit Ray
- Screenplay by: Satyajit Ray
- Based on: Abataranika by Narendranath Mitra
- Produced by: R.D. Bansal
- Starring: Anil Chatterjee; Madhabi Mukherjee; Haradhan Bannerjee; Haren Chatterjee; Vicky Redwood; Jaya Bhaduri; Sefalika Devi
- Cinematography: Subrata Mitra
- Edited by: Dulal Dutta
- Music by: Satyajit Ray
- Production companies: R.D. Bansal & Co.
- Distributed by: Edward Harrison (US)
- Release date: 27 September 1963 (India)
- Running time: 131 minutes
- Country: India
- Language: Bengali

Mahanagar (Bengali: মহানগর, lit. 'The Big City') is a 1963 Indian Bengali-language drama film written and directed by Satyajit Ray. Starring Madhabi Mukherjee in the leading role and based on the short story Abataranika by Narendranath Mitra, it tells the story of a housewife who disconcerts her traditionalist family by getting the job of a saleswoman. The film marked the first screen appearance of Jaya Bhaduri, one of Hindi cinema's leading actresses.

Shot in the first half of 1963 in Calcutta, Mahanagar was the first film directed by Ray set entirely in his native Calcutta, reflecting contemporary realities of the urban middle-class, where women going to work is no longer merely driven by ideas of emancipation, but has become an economic reality. The film examines the effects of the confident working woman on patriarchial attitudes and social dynamics. According to veteran film critic Philip French, the film stands alongside The Apu Trilogy as some of Ray's greatest work.

== Plot ==
In Calcutta in the 1950s, Arati, a homemaker, lives in a cramped apartment with not only her husband Subrata and their young son Pintu, but also Subrata's younger sister Bani, father Priyogopal, and mother Sarojini. Money is tight with only Subrata's income from working at a bank and doing some tutoring, so Arati tells him that she wants to get a job, and he helps her find work selling the Autonit, a knitting gadget, door-to-door. Subrata's orthodox and conservative parents disapprove, but Arati, who is initially hesitant and nervous on her own out in the world, soon begins to prosper in her field. She befriends Edith, an Anglo-Indian colleague, who exposes her to some modern Western ideas, including wearing lipstick.

Arati begins to find that she enjoys her new-found financial and psychological independence. However Subrata points out that both of his parents, and their son Pintu, are opposed to her working: "Peace within the family is more important than money." He also points out the physical toll that her long hours are taking on Arati. For these reasons, Subrata asks her to quit her job, saying he will, instead, find a second, part-time, job. Before Arati can quit, however, the bank Subrata works for shuts down in the last of the Calcutta bank crashes, so he has no choice but to let Arati continue to work. Now the sole breadwinner of the family, Arati immediately asks for a raise, and Mr. Mukherjee, her boss, gives it to her. He even says he intends to make her a group leader once he expands the sales force.

Subrata spends his days idly at home, his suspicions and insecurities deepened by such things as finding lipstick in Arati's purse and overhearing her lie and describe him as a successful businessman to a male acquaintance. Meanwhile, Priyogopal, a retired schoolteacher, begins visiting his successful former pupils after Arati starts to work, preferring to beg, rather than accept any money from her. He gets a badly needed pair of eyeglasses from an optometrist and some money from a lawyer, but then collapses and falls down a flight of stairs on his way to see a doctor, who chastises Subrata for neglecting his father. Priyogopal apologizes and agrees to let Arati care for him while he recuperates, and they reconcile.

Subrata goes to Arati's work when she is out and meets Mr. Mukherjee, an affable and astute man who quickly surmises why Subrata is there. Noting that they both are from Pabna District, Mukherjee offers to use his connections to help Subrata get a job, and they arrange to meet that evening. When Arati gets back to the office, Edith is in tears because Mukherjee just fired her, supposedly because he does not believe she was actually sick when she missed several days of work recently. Knowing Edith really was sick, and also that Mukherjee is biased against Anglo-Indians, the once-timid Arati confronts her boss over the unjust firing. After a heated exchange during which Mukherjee refuses to apologize to Edith, Arati hands him the resignation letter she did not give him before Subrata lost his job and storms off.

On her way out of the office, Arati meets Subrata returning. She tearfully apologizes for impulsively quitting her job, and, although Subarata realizes that now he will have to look elsewhere for work, he does not mention this to Arati, instead praising her for having the courage to stand up to injustice. Though they face an uncertain future, the couple reaffirms their commitment to each other and goes off together, hopeful that they will be able to find new jobs in such a big city.

== Cast ==
- Anil Chatterjee as Subrata "Bhombol" Mazumdar, Arati's husband
- Madhabi Mukherjee as Arati Mazumdar, Subrata's wife
- Haradhan Bannerjee as Himangshu Mukherjee, Arati's boss
- Haren Chatterjee as Priyogopal, Subrata's father
- Vicky Redwood as Edith Simmons, Arati's Anglo-Indian colleague
- Jaya Bhaduri as Bani, Subrata's sister
- Sefalika Devi as Sarojini, Subrata's mother
- Prosenjit Sarkar as Pintu, Arati and Subrata's son
- Shyamal Ghoshal as Anupam Ray Choudhury, a lawyer and former student of Priyogopal
- Shailen Mukherjee as Nobendu Banerjee, a doctor and former student of Priyogopal
- Gitali Roy as Anupam's wife
- Subrata Sensharma as Pranab, an eye specialist and former student of Priyogopal

== Reception and legacy ==
Upon its 1967 release in the United States, Mahanagar drew praise from Roger Ebert, Pauline Kael, and others. Ebert wrote that "the power of this extraordinary film seems to come in equal parts from the serene narrative style of director Satyajit Ray and the sensitive performances of the cast members", and he described the film as "one of the most rewarding screen experiences of our time". Bosley Crowther of the New York Times gave the film a rave review in which he said: "There is nothing obscure or over-stylized about this characteristic work by Mr. Ray. It is another of his beautifully fashioned and emotionally balanced contemplations of change in the thinking, the customs and the manners of the Indian middle-class."

In a review from 2013, Peter Bradshaw of The Guardian gave Mahanagar five stars out of five, describing it as "An utterly absorbing and moving drama about the changing worlds of work and home in 1950s India, and a hymn to uxorious love acted with lightness, intelligence and wit."

On the review aggregator website Rotten Tomatoes, 93% of 27 critics' reviews of the film are positive, with an average rating of 8.4/10.

== Awards ==
Satyajit Ray won the Silver Bear for Best Director at the 14th Berlin International Film Festival in 1964.

The film was selected as the Indian entry for Best Foreign Language Film at the 36th Academy Awards, but was not chosen as one of the final five nominees for the award.

At the 11th National Film Awards, the film won the All India Certificate of Merit for the Third Best Feature Film.

R.D. Bhansal won the first Filmfare Best Bengali Movie award in 1963.

== Preservation and restoration ==
The Academy Film Archive preserved Mahanagar in 1996. The Criterion Collection released a restored 2K version of the film in 2013.

== See also ==
- List of submissions to the 36th Academy Awards for Best Foreign Language Film
- List of Indian submissions for the Academy Award for Best Foreign Language Film
- Deux jours, une nuit – a 2014 film by the Dardenne brothers inspired by Mahanagar
