= Bijoy Sen =

Bangladeshi art director

- বিজয় সেন
- Occupation: Art director
- Years active: 1966–2000
- Notable work: Andha Biswas
- Awards: National Film Award (1st time)

Bijoy Sen is a Bangladeshi art director. He won Bangladesh National Film Award for Best Art Direction for the film Andha Biswas (1992).

== Selected films ==
- Behula - 1966
- Anowara - 1967
- Ki Je Kori - 1976
- Nazma - 1983
- Awara - 1985
- Ashanti - 1986
- Rajlokkhi Srikanto - 1987
- Lalu Mastan - 1987
- Ranga Bhabi - 1989
- Rajar Meye Bedeni - 1991
- Shongkhonil Karagar - 1992
- Ondho Bishwas - 1992
- Shopner Prithibi - 1996
- Uttarer Khep - 2000

== Awards and nominations ==
National Film Awards

Year	Award	Category	Film	Result
1992	National Film Award	Best Art Direction	Andha Biswas	Won
