= Aap Ki Khatir (1977 film) =

- Poster
- Directed by: Sudhendu Roy
- Written by: Sunder Dar
- Story by: Indu Kohli; Uma Thakur; Pushpa Ghai
- Produced by: Harsh Kohli
- Starring: Vinod Khanna; Rekha
- Cinematography: Dilip Ranjan Mukhopadhyay
- Edited by: Ravi Patnaik
- Music by: Bappi Lahiri
- Release date: 7 June 1977
- Country: India
- Language: Hindi

Aap Ki Khatir (transl. For your sake) is a 1977 Bollywood film, produced by Harsh Kohli and directed by Sudhendu Roy. The stars are Vinod Khanna, Rekha, Helen and Om Shivpuri. The film's music is by Bappi Lahiri. The last song in the film "Bombay se Aaya Mera Dost" became a memorable hit. The film is a remake of the American film For Pete's Sake (1974).

== Plot ==
Sagar (Vinod Khanna) defies his wealthy family by marrying a poor girl named Sarita (Rekha) and therefore is cut out of his family's inheritance. He then decides to make a living by driving a cab. Sarita feels guilty that he left his wealth behind to marry her. She raises Rs.10,000 from a loan shark but lies to her husband saying she got it from her uncle. She then asks her husband to give the money to a stockbroker friend to invest. When the investment doesn't result in healthy dividends, Sarita becomes desperate to raise the money to repay the loan shark. She inadvertently gets hooked up with a madam (Nadira) who sends clients to her apartment. Sarita gets into humorous incidents as she avoids contact with her male clients.

== Cast ==
- Vinod Khanna as Sagar
- Rekha as Sarita
- Helen as Shola
- Om Shivpuri as Suraj
- Nadira as Shanti
- Mac Mohan as Mac
- Tun Tun as Dancer / Singer
- Asrani as Bhola
- Tarun Ghosh as Hazarimal
- Murad as Sagar's Father
- Sonia Sahni as Suraj's Wife

== Soundtrack ==
Song	Singer
"Seedhi Saadi Shehzadi"	Kishore Kumar
"Raja Mere Tere Liye"	Lata Mangeshkar
"Aap Ke Khatir"	Lata Mangeshkar
"Pyara Ek Bangla Ho, Bangle Mein Gaadi Ho"	Lata Mangeshkar, Bappi Lahiri
"O Shola, O Shola, O Shola Shola Re, O Bhola, O Bhola, O Bhola Bhola Re"	Shailendra Singh, Usha Mangeshkar, Bappi Lahiri
"Bambai Se Aaya Mera Dost"	Bappi Lahiri
