= Abdus Sobur =

Bangladeshi art director and actor

- আব্দুস সবুর
- Occupations: Art director and Actor
- Years active: 1959–1999
- Notable work: Aradhana; Surjogrohon; Ghatak
- Awards: National Film Award (5th times)

Abdus Sobur is a Bangladeshi art director and actor. He won Bangladesh National Film Award for Best Art Direction five times for the films Aradhana (1979), Surjogrohon (1986), The Affliction of Estrangement (1989), Surjogrohon (1990), and Ghatak (1994).

== Selected films ==
=== As actor ===
- Jibon Nouka - 1981

=== As art director ===
- Matir Pahar - 1959
- Kokhono Asheni - 1961
- Talash - 1963
- Rupban - 1965
- Behula - 1966
- Nawab Sirajuddaula - 1967
- Darshan - 1967
- Nayan Tara - 1967
- Anowara - 1967
- Dui Bhai - 1968
- Tum Mere Ho - 1968
- Sooye Nadiya Jaage Pani - 1968
- Songsar - 1968
- Pitch Dhala Path - 1968
- Neel Akasher Nichey - 1969
- Jowar Bhata - 1969
- Jibon Theke Neya - 1970
- Darpochurno - 1970
- Apon Por - 1970
- Sadharon Meye - 1970
- Ka Kha Ga Gha Umo - 1970
- Deep Nebhe Nai - 1970
- Shorolipi - 1971
- Nacher Putul - 1971
- Obujh Mon - 1972
- Yea Kore Biye - 1972
- Chhando Hariye Gelo - 1972
- Jhorer Pakhi - 1973
- Shopno Diye Ghera - 1973
- Rangbaaz - 1973
- Songram - 1973
- Alor Michil - 1974
- Masud Rana - 1974
- The Rain - 1976
- Shurjogrohon - 1976
- Moti Mahal - 1977
- Toofan - 1978
- Bodhu Biday - 1978
- Alankar - 1978
- Din Jai Kotha Thakey - 1979
- Shurjo Shongram - 1979
- Matir Ghar - 1979
- Aradhona - 1979
- Shesh Uttor - 1980
- Jibon Nouka - 1981
- Kalmilata - 1981
- Lal Kajal - 1982
- Notun Bou - 1983
- Nag Purnima - 1983
- Chandranath - 1984
- Shuvoda - 1986
- Biroho Byatha - 1989
- Top Rangbaaz - 1991
- Ochena - 1991
- Utthan Poton - 1992
- Sotorko Shoitan - 1993
- Ghatok - 1994
- Commander - 1994
- Bishwapremik - 1995
- Palabi Kothae - 1997
- Ekhono Onek Raat - 1997
- Madam Fuli - 1999
- Pagla Ghonta - 1999

== Awards and nominations ==
National Film Awards

Year	Award	Category	Film	Result
1979	National Film Award	Best Art Direction	Aradhana	Won
1986	National Film Award	Best Art Direction	Surjogrohon	Won
1989	National Film Award	Best Art Direction	The Affliction of Estrangement	Won
1990	National Film Award	Best Art Direction	Surjogrohon	Won
1994	National Film Award	Best Art Direction	Ghatak	Won
