= Common Gender =

Bangladeshi film

- Film poster
- Bengali: কমন জেন্ডার
- Directed by: Noman Robin
- Starring: Dolly Zahur; Chitralekha Guho; Dileep Chakraborty; Saju Khadem
- Music by: Arfin Rumey; Balam
- Release date: 22 June 2012
- Country: Bangladesh
- Language: Bengali-language

Common Gender is a 2012 Bangladeshi film starring Dolly Zahur and Chitralekha Guha. It is the first Bangladeshi film to portray the lives of Hijra or transgender people. It is one of the first films in world cinema to have two transgender people as lead characters. It was subsequently released in the United States. Chitralekha Guho plays a pivotal character.

== Story ==
Sushmita (born Sushmoy) is a hijra, who resides in a group of transgender people, and makes a living by dance performances at various wedding ceremonies. One day at a wedding night, she meets a boy – Sanjay, who is straight – who Sushmita falls in love with. Despite Sushmita being transgender, Sanjay accepts their love.

== Cast ==
- Dolly Johur
- Chitralekha Guho
- Dileep Chakraborty as Sanjay
- Saju Khadem as Shushmita
- Manosh Bandopadhyay Shushmiter's father
- Sohel Khan
- Delowar Hossain
- Hasan Masood
- Rosey Siddiqui as Shushmita's mother

== Soundtrack ==
Common Gender

Soundtrack album by Arfin Rumey and Balam
- Released: 2012
- Genre: film music
- Producer: Gaanchill

Track	Song	Singer(s)
1	Chand Jemon Ghomta Diye	Balam & Nazmun Munira Nancy
2	Bajare Dhol	Arfin Rumey
3	Upche Pore Premer Jol	Saira Reza
4	Sakkhi Ache Rab	Ferdous Wahid
5	Maago Maa	Balam
৬	Jugol Milon	Arif Baul
7	Upche Pore Premer Jol (DJ Mix)	Saira Reza and DJ Rahat
8	Shakkhi Ache Rob (reprise)	Arfin Rumey
9	Bajare Dhol	Hasan Masud
