= Samurai Maruf =

- সামুরাই মারুফ
- Born: Maruf Hossain Ibn Saeed; Chittagong, Bangladesh.
- Occupation: Art director
- Years active: 2006–present
- Notable work: Taarkata; Zero Degree
- Awards: National Film Award (2nd times)

Maruf Hossain Ibn Saeed (popularly known as Samurai Maruf or Maruf Samurai) is a Bangladeshi art director. He won Bangladesh National Film Award for Best Art Direction two times for the films Taarkata (2014) and Zero Degree (2015).

== Selected films ==
- The Guest - 2013
- Taarkata - 2014
- Zero Degree - 2015
- Samraat - 2016
- Debi - 2018

== Awards and nominations ==
National Film Awards

Year	Award	Category	Film	Result
2014	National Film Award	Best Art Direction	Taarkata	Won
2015	National Film Award	Best Art Direction	Zero Degree	Won
