= Abujh Bou =

2010 Bangladeshi film

- Directed by: Arthik Sazib & Nargis Akhtar
- Screenplay by: Nargis Akhtar
- Story by: Rabindranath Tagore
- Produced by: Faridur Reza Sagor
- Starring: Bobita; Priyanka; Ferdous Ahmed; Nipun Akhtar; Shakil Khan
- Cinematography: Shahidullah Dulal
- Edited by: Mujibur Rahman Dulu
- Music by: Sujeo Shyam
- Distributed by: Impress Telefilm
- Release date: 10 September 2010 (Bangladesh)
- Running time: 155 minutes
- Country: Bangladesh
- Language: Bengali

Abujh Bou (Bengali: অবুঝ বউ), translated as "The Dumb Wife", is a 2010 Bangladeshi film directed by Arthik Sazib and Nargis Akhtar and stars Ferdous Ahmed and Priyanka in her debut role. It earned three awards at 35th Bangladesh National Film Awards.

== Synopsis ==
It is a female centric movie. Mrinmoyee, a desperate tomboy girl who taunts all in-laws after her marriage, later turns realistic.

== Cast ==
- Bobita
- Priyanka (debut) - Mrinmoyee
- Ferdous Ahmed - Apurba Roy
- Nipun - Kalyani
- Shakil Khan

== Release ==
The film had its world TV premier on 10 September 2010. The same day it was released.

== Soundtrack ==
No.	Title	Lyrics	Music	singer(s)	Length
1.	"Ami Dossi Meye"	Mohammed Rafiquzzaman	Sujeo Shyam	Shakila Zafar
2.	"Biyer Sajone"	Mohammed Rafiquzzman	Sujeo Shyam	Mamun and Shukla

== Awards ==
35th Bangladesh National Film Awards

- Best Screenplay - Nargis Akhtar
- Best Music Director - Sujeo Shyam
- Best Editor - Mujibur Rahman Dulu

== See also ==
- Meghla Akash
- Megher Koley Rod
