= Hariprobha Takeda =

Bengali writer

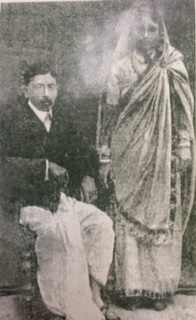
- Uemon and Hariprabha Takeda
- Born: 1890
- Died: 1972; Kolkata, West Bengal
- Spouse: Wemon Takeda

Hariprobha Takeda (1890-1972) also known as Hariprobha Basu Mallik was a Bengali woman who married a Japanese national. She lived in Japan and wrote a notable autobiography which was turned into a movie in Bangladesh.

== Personal life ==
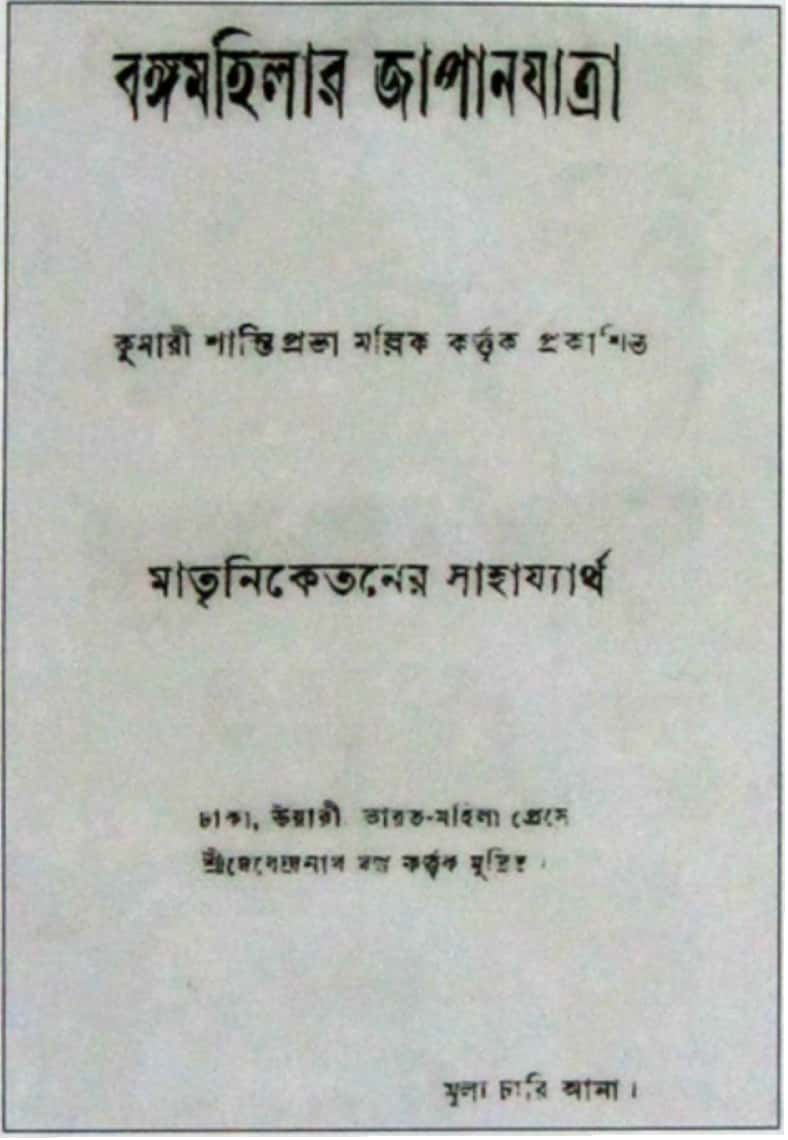
Front page of the book of Bangamahilar Japan Jatra, 1915

In 1907 Hariprobha married Uemon Takeda, a Japanese businessman residing in Dhaka, East Bengal. He manufactured soaps in Bulbul soap factory. Hariprobha moved to Tokyo, Japan in 1912. She published Bongo Mohilar Japan Jatra (A Bengali Lady's Visit to Japan), which detailed her travels and experiences there. She settled permanently in Japan in 1941.

== World War II ==
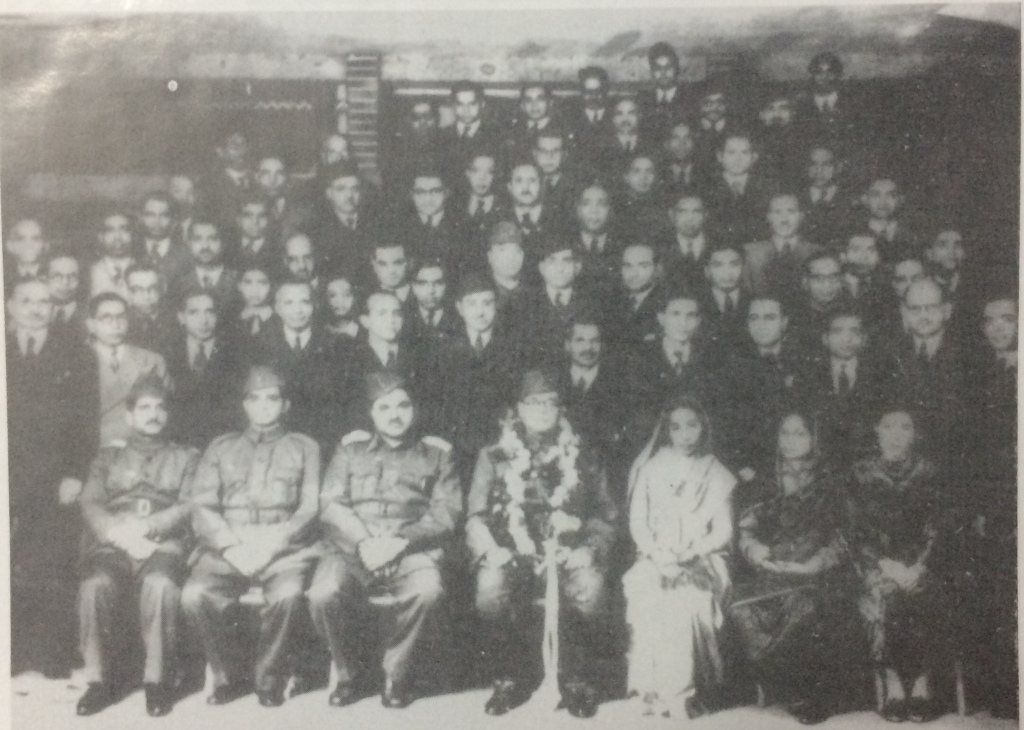
Hariprobha Takeda, second from right in the front row. The middle man is of course Subhas Chandra Bose

She worked for the Japanese imperial army broadcasting messages/news for the Bengali Indian National Army led Subhas Chandra Bose from 1944 to 1945. The Indian National Army was allied with Japan during World War II. During the war her husband fell ill. She travelled to work at the dead of night to avoid allied bombing of Tokyo. She wrote another book about the effect of the war on the Japanese people. She was aided in her broadcasts by Rash Behari Bose. She moved to Jalpaiguri, West Bengal, after her husband's death.

== Legacy ==
Hariprobha died in 1972 in Shambhunath Pandit Hospital, Kolkata, West Bengal. Tanvir Mokammel have made a documentary based on her book and her life called Japani Bodhu (The Japanese Wife).
