= Jeevan Mukt =

- Directed by: Sudhendu Roy
- Produced by: Sudhendu Roy; S.R. Productions
- Starring: Girish Karnad; Laxmi; Parikshat Sahni; Vidya Sinha; Suresh Oberoi
- Music by: Rahul Dev Burman; Yogesh (lyrics)
- Release date: 1977 (India)
- Running time: 113 minutes
- Country: India
- Language: Hindi

Jeevan Mukt (Hindi: जीवन मुक्त; translation: Freedom in Life) is a 1977 Bollywood drama film directed by Sudhendu Roy. This family drama stars Girish Karnad, Laxmi, Parikshit Sahni, Vidya Sinha in lead roles. This is the first full length film of Suresh Oberoi.

== Plot ==
The story is about Anita's quest for love, her tribulations in this process and her ultimate realisation of freedom in life.

== Cast ==
- Parikshat Sahni as Satish Sharma
- Girish Karnad as Amarjeet
- Laxmi
- Vidya Sinha
- Suresh Oberoi as Suresh

== Crew ==
- Direction – Sudhendu Roy
- Production – Sudhendu Roy
- Edition – Subhash Sehgal
- Production company – S.R. Productions
- Music composition – Rahul Dev Burman
- Lyrics – Yogesh
- Playback – Asha Bhosle

== Soundtrack ==
Song	Singer
"Phoolon Ke Desh Mein"	Kishore Kumar
"Aao Wahin Hum Chale"	Asha Bhosle
"Hey Shyam Kahoon Kaise"	Asha Bhosle
"Humne Kabhi Socha Nahin"	Asha Bhosle
"Lehrake Dagar Chali Jaati Hai"	Asha Bhosle
