= Abdul Khalek =

- আব্দুল খালেক
- Occupations: Art director production manager
- Years active: 1975–1994
- Notable work: Agaman
- Awards: National Film Award (1st time)

Abdul Khalek is a Bangladeshi art director and production manager. He won Bangladesh National Film Award for Best Art Direction for the film Agaman (1988).

== Selected films ==
- Bandi Theke Begum - 1975
- Nishan - 1977
- Alankar - 1978
- Notun Bou - 1983
- Nazma - 1983
- The Hunger - 1984
- Ranga Bhabi - 1989
- Mayer Doa - 1990
- Santona - 1991
- Golapi Ekhon Dhakai - 1994

== Awards and nominations ==
National Film Awards

Year	Award	Category	Film	Result
1988	National Film Award	Best Art Direction	Agaman	Won
