= Char Satiner Ghar =

Bangladeshi social film

- Poster
- চার সতীনের ঘর
- Directed by: Nargis Akhter
- Screenplay by: Nargis Akhter
- Based on: Hridoy O Sromer Songsar by Selina Hossain
- Starring: Alamgir; Bobita; Diti; Shabnur; Moyuri; Mahfuz Ahmed
- Production company: Bangladesh Film Development Corporation
- Distributed by: Femcom Bangladesh
- Release date: 20 January 2005 (Bangladesh)
- Running time: 140 min
- Country: Bangladesh
- Language: Bengali

Char Satiner Ghar (Eng : Four Wives's Forum) is a 2005 social awareness Bengali film directed by Nargis Akhter, based on the story Hridoy O Sromer Songsar by Selina Hossain. The gist of the movie was 'Parents are responsible for having children both ways, and an extra marriage can't cure it'. Alamgir, Bobita, Diti, Shabnur, Mayuri and many others Bangladeshi actors have acted in it.

== Storyline ==
Khan Saheb i.e. Kashem Khan is a respected rich man of the village. Although he has a lot of wealth, he has none of this huge wealth. He got married four times in a row in the hope of having children but still failed to have children. At first he thought his wives were infertile women, which tempted him to marry again and again. But he surrenders to his last wife, the stubborn Phulbanu Jade, and seeks the help of a doctor, and only then does he realize that it is not his wives' fault to not give birth but his own disability.

== Cast ==
- Alamgir as Kashem Khan (Khan Shaheb).
- Bobita as Khan Shaheb's first wife.
- Diti as Khan Shaheb's second wife.
- Moyuri as Khan Shaheb's third wife.
- Shabnur as Fulbanu (Khan Shaheb's fourth wife).
- Mahfuz Ahmed as Mazhi (Boatman).
- Dany Sidak as Kalu (Khan house's servant).
- Amir Shirazi as Fulbanu's father.
- Rasheda Chowdhury as Fulbanu's mother.
- Suchorita as doctor.
- Rani Sarkar
- Zamilur Rahman Shakha as Kazi Shaheb.
- Serajul Karim (as Sirajul Karim).
- Shamima Nazneen.
- Nauha Munir Dihan (as Dihan).
- Upama Moti Banu (as Upoma).
- Sufia.
- Kamola Rani Das.
- Syed Akhtar Ali
- Milon
- Sayem Samad (as Syem Samad).
- Rabindranath
- Jahangir
- Milu
- Sarowar
- Abdul Haque
- Selim Haider
- Babul Chowdhury
- Abdul Karim Old boatman (as Karim).
- Moshi
- Promit
