= Shakil Khan =

Bangladeshi actor and politician

- শাকিল খান
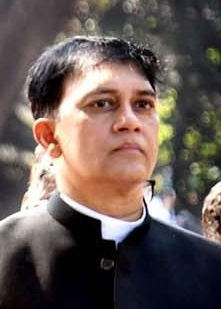
- Khan in 2022
- Born: Shakil Ahasan; 3 November 1968 (age 57); Khulna, Bangladesh
- Occupations: Actor; politician; businessman; social activist
- Years active: 1997-2025
- Notable work: Biyer Phul, Meghla Akash, Abujh Bou, Baba Amar Baba
- Spouses: Jona (m. 2002; div. 2003) Sharmin Hossain (m. 2006)
- Children: 2
- Website: shakilkhanofficial.com

Shakil Ahasan (born 3 November 1968), better known as Shakil Khan, is a Bangladeshi film actor, politician, businessman, and social activist who dominantly works in Dhallywood cinema. He made his debut in the film Amar Ghor Amar Behesht (1997).

== Career ==
Khan Started his film career with success of Amar Ghor Amar Behest, thereafter he continued to play the lead roles in genres like romance, social and action in movies such as Paharadar, Maa Jokhon Bicharok, Biyer Phul, Narir Mon, Jibon Chabi, Praner Priyotoma, Sontrashi Bandhu, Ei MonTomake Dilam, Milon Malar Prem, Dushtu Meye Misthi Chele, Jabi Koi, Manush Keno Omanush, Hridoyer Bashi, Sobar Ojante, Amar Antore Tumi, Giringibaj and Bolona Bhalobashi.

Some of his notable performances as a supporting actor are Mayer Bodla, Bhul Sob E Bhul, Manush Manusher Jonno, Sokhi Tumi Kar, Mon, Baba Amar Baba, Koshto, Biyanshab and Tomakey Khujchi. Khan went on to perform in films Paharadar, Biyer Phul, Narir Mon, Koshto, and Abujh Bou, among others.

Khan continued to build his presence in cinema with notable performances in films such as Paharadar etc, his roles during this period showcased his versatility and helped solidify his reputation as a dependable and compelling actor in the industry.

== Personal life ==
Shakil was born on 3 November 1968 in Khulna,Bangladesh .

== Filmography ==
Year	Title	Role	Notes	Ref.
1997	Amar Ghor Amar Behest	Raja	Debut film; remake of Hindi film Dil	
1998	Ei Mon Tomake Dilam	Noyon	Remake of Hindi film Dilwale	
1998	Agnisakkhi	Faisal		
1998	Raja Rani Badsha	Joy	Indo-Bangladesh joint production; remake of 1991 Kannada film Bhairavi	
1998	Maa Jokhon Bicharok	Raju Chowdhury		
1998	Milon Malar Prem	Milon		
1998	Manush Keno Amanush	Shahed Ahmed		
1998	Amar Ontore Tumi	Shamim		
1999	Paharadar			
1999	Bilat Ferot Meye			
1999	Jibon Chabi			
1999	Biyer Phul	Akash		
1999	Praner Priyotoma			
1999	Moger Mulluk			
1999	Shotru Dhongsho			
1999	Manush Manusher Jonyo			
1999	Zor			
2000	Narir Mon	Joy Chowdhury		
2000	Dushtu Chele Misty Meye	Noyon		
2000	Amar Bou			
2000	Sobar Ojante			
2000	Tumi Je Amar			
2000	Jabi Koi?			
2000	Sontrashi Bondhu			
2000	Koshto	Shakil		
2001	Mon			
2002	Meghla Akash	Tingku		
2002	Har Har Mahadev	Jaideep	Debut in Hindi film	
2002	Hridoyer Bashi			
2005	Bolona Bhalobasi	Sujon		
2006	Mayer Bodla			
2007	Brishty Bheja Akash			
2007	Rokto Pipasa			
2008	Baba Amar Baba	Shoufiq		
2008	Tomakey Khunjchhi			
2010	Abujh Bou			
2019	Prothom Dekha Prothom Prem	Prothom / Uday	Dual role; Released on YouTube	(Note: official YouTube link:)

== Award and nominations ==
Year	Award	Category	Works	Result	Ref.
1998	Meril-Prothom Alo Awards	Best Film Actor	Popularity	Nominated	
2001	Sweet Media Light Award	Best Film Actor	Excellence in Acting and Exceptional Media Presence	Won	
2001	Bangladesh Cultural Movement Award	Best Film Actor	Cultural Contributions and Strengthening the Role of Cinema in National Identity	Won	
2007	Human Rights Review Gold Award	Best Film Actor	Impactful Work in Socially Sonscious Films and Advocacy Through Art	Won	
2012	A-ONE Telemedia Award	Best Film Actor	Outstanding Performance and Contribution to Bangladeshi Cinema	Won	
2024	CJFB Jury Award	Best Film Actor	Best Achievements of His Acting Career	Won	
2025	Bangladesh Cultural Reporters' Association "BCRA" Award	Best Film Actor	Best Achievements of His Acting Career	Won	
2025	Tourism Fair Award	Best Film Actor	Outstanding Performance and Contribution to Bangladeshi Cinema	Won	

== See also ==
- Cinema of Bangladesh
