= Nissash Amar Tumi =

- Poster
- Directed by: Bodiul Alom Kokun
- Written by: Sundeep Malani; Hossain
- Story by: Veeru Potla
- Produced by: Monir Hossion
- Starring: Shakib Khan; Apu Biswas; Shiwoli Shela; Sami; Misha Sawodagor; Probir Mitro
- Cinematography: Mazno
- Edited by: Zinnath Hossion Zinnath
- Music by: Ali Akram Shuvo & Sayeem Hasan
- Distributed by: Asha Production
- Release date: 2010
- Running time: 174 minutes
- Country: Bangladesh
- Language: Bengali

Nissash Amar Tumi is a 2010 Dhallywood romantic comedy film directed by Bodiul Alom Kokun and produced by Asha Production. The film stars Shakib Khan and Apu Biswas in the lead roles. It is a remake of the 2005 Telugu film Nuvvostanante Nenoddantana. Nissash Amar Tumi was a hit at the box-office and was one of the highest grossing Bengali movies of 2010. It won two awards at the 2010 National Film Awards.

== Plot ==
Hridoy (Shakib Khan) is a rich city boy, born to billionaire parents and brought up in London. On the other hand, Aasha (Apu Biswas) is a traditional, simple desi girl from Bangladesh who is brought up by her only brother, Mohammod Ali (Misha Sawdagor). He is heartbroken when their father marries another woman and throws them out of the house, humiliating them on the way. Their mother dies and her tomb is built on the small land which they own until the zamindar tells them that it is his land, since their mother had taken a loan from the man. Mohammod Ali volunteers to work day and night, to pay off the loan as long as they don't tear down his mother's tomb. The Zamindar agrees and the local station master helps them. Slowly Mohammod Ali and Aasha grow up. One day, Purnima, Aasha's best friend, comes to their house to invite Aasha to their house as she is getting married. Purnima's cousin, Hridoy also arrives on the same day with his mother, Shabnur (Dulari).

Slowly Hridoy and Aasha fall in love but Hridoy's mother does not bear it as Aasha is not as rich as them, and is thus not to their standards; Hridoy is also to be married to Shabnur's brother's business partner's daughter, Bobby. Shabnur humiliates Aasha as well as Mohammod Ali, who arrives a minute before, and both are thrown of the house after Shabnur accuses them of trying to entice and trap Hridoy. When Hridoy learns of this, he goes to Aasha's house and pleads to her brother to accept him. Mohammod Ali gives him a chance, just like he was given a chance by the Zamindar when he was little. Hridoy is tasked to take care of the cows, clean up after them and grow more crops than Mohammod Ali by the end of the season; if he does not, Hridoy will be thrown out of the village and can never see Aasha again. The Zamindar and his son is not happy as the Zamindar's son wanted to marry Aasha. With them and Bobby and her father trying to get Hridoy to lose the competition, Hridoy has to work hard for his love, eating red chillies and rice everyday, even though he can't bear it. Through many antics from the Zamindar's side and Bobby's side, Hridoy eventually proves his love for Aasha to Mohammod Ali, and succeeds in growing more grains. However, Zamindar & his son kidnap Aasha and then later tries to rape her. A fight takes place in which Hridoy kills the Zamindar's son. Mohammod Ali, after realizing that Hridoy and Aasha should be together, takes the blame for this and spends 5 years in prison. The movie ends with Mohammod Ali's release from prison which is also when Aasha and Hridoy get married, in everyone's presence. Shabnur then accepts Aasha to be her daughter-in-law.

== Cast ==
- Shakib Khan as Hridoy
- Apu Biswas as Asha
- Misha Sawdagor as Mohammod Ali, Asha's brother
- Ali Raj as Hridoy's father
- Shiwoli Shela
- Sami
- Prabir Mitra
- Sadek Bachchu
- Shiba Shanu
- Dulari
- Afzal Sharif
- Boby
- Elias Kobra

== Music ==
Nissash Amar Tumi

Studio album by Ali Akram Shuvo
- Released: 2010 (Bangladesh)
- Genre: Feature film soundtrack
- Producer: CD Choich

Nissash Amar Tumi film's music directed by Bangladeshi famous music director Ali Akram Shuvo. And some part of music given by Sayeem Hasan.

=== Soundtrack ===
Trac	Song	Singers	Performers	Notes
1	Nishash Amar Tumi (Title Track)	Asif Akbar and Kanak Chapa	Shakib Khan and Apu Biswas	
2	Bhalobashar Hobe Joy	S. I. Tutul	Shakib Khan	
3	Tumi Amar Chile Amar Thakbe	Andrew Kishore and Runa Laila	Shakib Khan and Apu Biswas	
4	Rupali Chad Nemeche	Andrew Kishore and Kanak Chapa	Shakib Khan and Apu Biswas	
5	Pakhi Der Dana Jodi Pai	Sabina Yasmin	Apu Biswas	

== Award ==
National Film Award (for the year 2010)

- won. Best lyric writer : Kabir Bakul for song - Rupali Chad Nemese
- won. Best Comedian : Afzal Sharif
