= Khairul Alam Sabuj =

Bangladeshi actor, playwright and translator

- খায়রুল আলম সবুজ
- Sabuj in 2020
- Education: University of Dhaka
- Occupations: Actor, playwright, translator

Khairul Alam Sabuj is a Bangladeshi actor, playwright and translator. As of 2020, he published four story books and wrote more than 35 television dramas. He received Bangla Academy Literary Award (2019) in the translation category by the Government of Bangladesh.

== Early life and career ==
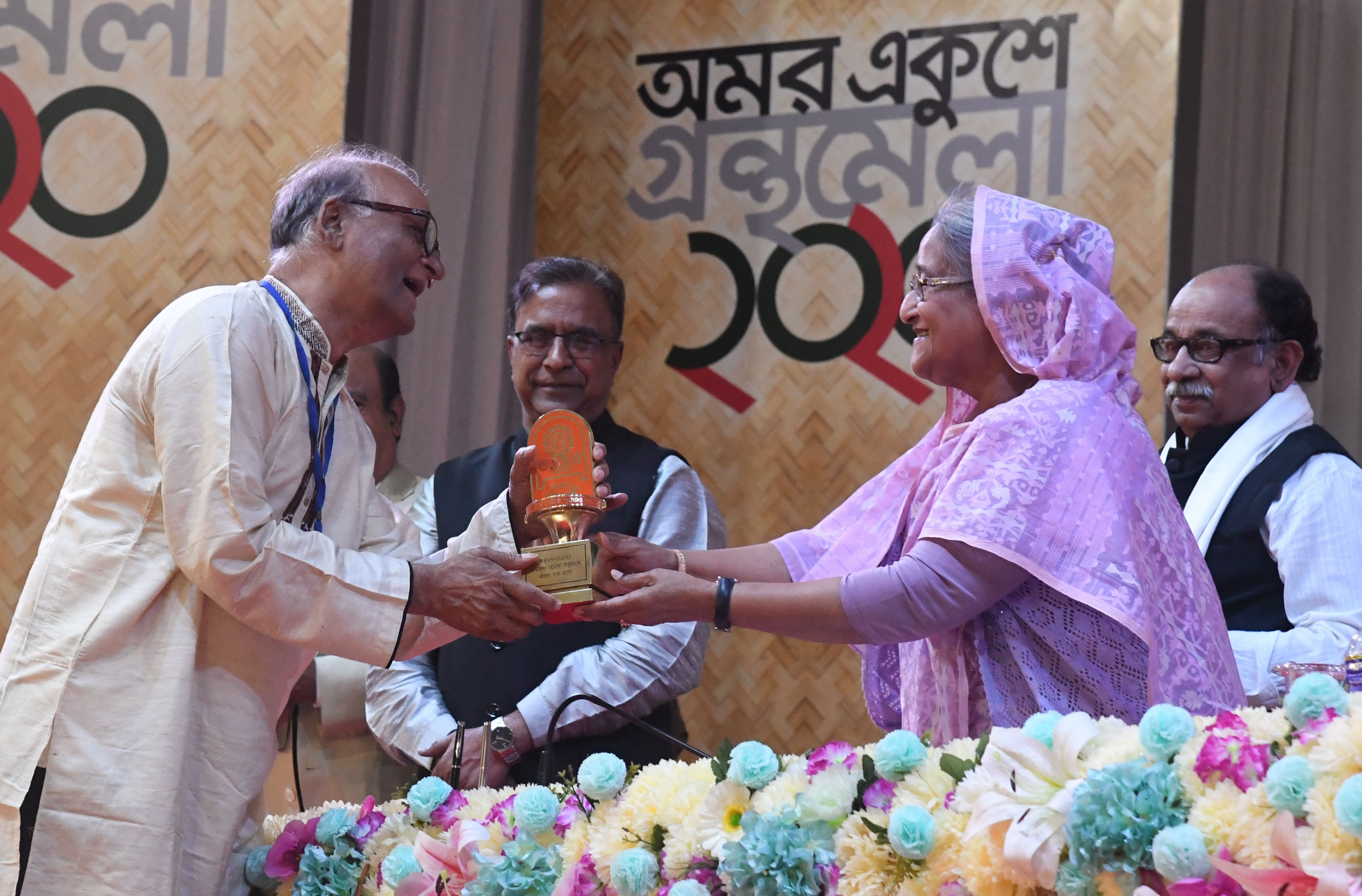
Sabuj receiving 2019 Bangladesh Academy Literary Award

Sabuj grew up in Barisal and graduated in English literature from the University of Dhaka. was one of the leaders at Dhaka University Central Students' Union (DACSU).

Sabuj was a teacher in Libya in 1980.

== Works ==
Sabuj translated Norwegian playwright Henrik Ibsen's 12 plays into Bengali language.

Television

- Kothao Keu Nei (1990)
- Noashal (2004)
- Kajer Meye (2008)
- Mahanagar (2007)
- Mayur Bahon (2008)
- Asharey Golpo (2010)
- Shada Pata-e Kalo Daag (2010)
- Tomader Golpo 2 (2026)

Theatre playwright

- Translation of The Dumb Waiter by Harold Pinter

Film

- Nondito Noroke
- Molla Barir Bou (2005)
- Meherjaan (2011)
- Horijupia (2015)
- Rupsha Nodir Banke (2020)
- Mujib: The Making of a Nation (2022)

Book

- Sophia Loren: Tar Apon Kotha (original Sophia Living & Loving: Her Own Story by A.E. Hotchner) (2003)

== Personal life ==
Sabuj is married to Shirin Alam and together they have a daughter Protiti Purna.
