= Megher Koley Rod =

Bangladeshi film

- Poster
- Directed by: Nargis Akhtar
- Screenplay by: Nargis Akhtar
- Starring: Riaz; Tony Dias; Sadika Parvin Popy; Kabori
- Music by: S. I. Tutul
- Release date: 1 August 2008
- Running time: 143 minutes
- Country: Bangladesh
- Language: Bengali-language

Megher Koley Rod (English: Sunshines in the Lap of Clouds) is a 2008 Bangladeshi film directed by Nargis Akhtar and stars Riaz, Tony Dias and Popy in lead roles. It earned six awards at the 33rd Bangladesh National Film Awards.

== Synopsis ==
It deals with HIV AIDS disease. Its story is parallel to the director's first movie Meghla Akash. The film is made to create consciousness about lethal HIV AIDS. Popy plays an AIDS patient, Rodela.

== Cast ==
- Riaz - Udoy
- Tony Dias - Nijhum
- Popy - Rodela
- Kabori - Doctor Selina Hossain
- Amirul Haque Chowdhury
- Rasheda Chowdhury
- Dilara Zaman

== Soundtrack ==
Megher Koley Rod

Soundtrack album by S I Tutul (composer) Pranab Ghosh (lyrics)
- Released: 2008 (Bangladesh)
- Recorded: 2008
- Genre: film music
- Label: Music
- Producer: Eagle Music

#	Song-title	Singer(s)
1	Bondhu Khuje Pelam	Asif Akbar, Dinat Jahan Munni and Robi Chowdhury
2	Ei Ki Prem Bhalobasha	Asif Akbar and Dinat Jahan Munni
3	Shob Kotha Bolena Hridoy	Monir Khan, Asif Akbar and Dinat Jahan Munni
4	Tak Dum Dum Tak	Robi Chowdhury, Dinat Jahan Munni and Pranab Ghosh

== Awards ==
33rd Bangladesh National Film Awards

- Best Actress - Popy
- Best Story - Mohammad Rafiquzzaman
- Best Lyrics - Kabir Bakul
- Best Art Direction - Kalantar
- Best Costume Design - Md Shamsul Islam

== See also ==
- Abujh Bou
