= Tanvir Mokammel =

Bangladeshi film director (born 1955)

- তানভীর মোকাম্মেল
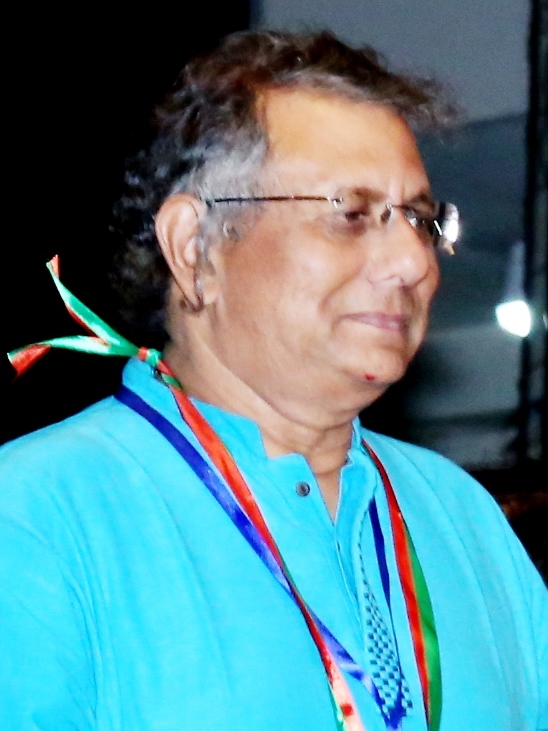
- Mokammel in 2017
- Born: 8 March 1955 (age 71); Khulna, East Pakistan, Pakistan
- Education: University of Dhaka
- Occupations: filmmaker, writer
- Years active: 1984–present
- Website: www.tanvirmokammel.info

Tanvir Mokammel (born 8 March 1955) is a Bangladeshi filmmaker and writer. He is the recipient of Ekushey Padak in 2017. He won Bangladesh National Film Awards total ten times for the films Nodir Naam Modhumoti (1995), Chitra Nodir Pare (1999) and Lalsalu (2001). He is the current director of Bangladesh Film Institute in Dhaka.

== Early life and education ==
Tanvir Mokammel grew up in Khulna. His father worked as a magistrate in Narail and his mother was a teacher in a local college. He completed his master's in English literature at the University of Dhaka.

== Career ==
Since he was a university student, Mokammel worked as a left-wing journalist for landless peasants in rural areas. As a filmmaker he has made six full-length features and fifteen documentaries and short films, some of which have received national and international awards.

His feature films are "Nodir Naam Modhumoti" (The River Named Modhumati), "Chitra Nodir Pare" (Quiet Flows the River Chitra), "Lalsalu" (A Tree Without Roots), "Lalon", "Rabeya" (The Sister), and "Jibondhuli" (The Drummer). Tanvir Mokammel's prominent documentaries are "The Garment Girls of Bangladesh", "The Unknown Bard", "Teardrops of Karnaphuli", "Riders to the Sunderbans", "A Tale of the Jamuna River", "The Promised Land", "Tajuddin Ahmad :An Unsung Hero", "The Japanese Wife", "Swapnabhumi" and mega-documentary "1971". His movies "Nadir Naam Modhumati" (The River Named Modhumati) and "Chitra Nodir Pare" (Quiet Flows the River Chitra) ranked second and third respectively in the list of 10 best Bangladeshi films, in the audience and critics' polls conducted by the British Film Institute.

Mokammel has written poems, short stories, and newspaper articles on cinema and cultural issues. Tanvir Mokammel's important books are "A Brief History of World Cinema", "The Art of Cinema", "Charlie Chaplin: Conquests by a Tramp", "Syed Waliullah, Sisyphus and Quest of Tradition in Novel" (a work of literary criticism), "Grundtvig and Folk Education" (a book on alternative educational ideas), and a translation of Maxim Gorky's play "The Lower Depths".

Mokammel established a film institute called Bangladesh Film Centre.

== Filmography ==
Year	Title	English Title	Contribution	Notes
1984	Hooliya	Wanted	Script/Direction	An experimental short feature film based on a political poem by poet Nirmalendu Goon
1991	Smriti Ekattor	Remembrance of '71	Script/Direction	A documentary on the massacre on Bengalis in 1971.
1993	Ekti Golir Atyakahini	Tale of a Lane	Script/Direction	A documentary on the life and the present condition of the Hindu conch shell makers of old Dhaka
1996	Nodir Naam Modhumoti	The River Named Modhumati	Script/Direction	A feature film on the backdrop of the Bangladesh liberation war in 1971. Received three national awards for best story, best dialogue and best song. Shown in the Tri Continental Film Festival, Nantes, France.
1996	Achin Pakhi	The Unknown Bird	Script/Direction	A documentary film on the Bauls.
1996	Swapnar School	A School for Swapna	Script/Direction	A documentary on the alternative schools for the poor adults
1999	Chitra Nodir Pare	Quiet Flows The River Chitra	Script/Direction	Won - National Film Awards in 7 category including Best Film.
1999	Images And Impressions	Images And Impressions	Script/Direction	A documentary on the ideals of the Folk High Schools in Denmark.
2001	Lalsalu	A Tree Without Roots	Script/Direction	Won - National Film Award in 7 category including Best Film.
2002	Oie Jamuna	A Tale of the Jamuna River	Script/Direction	
2004	Lalon	Lalon	Script/Direction	A Feature film on Lalon Shah. Won - National Film Award for Best Art Direction
2005	Karnaphulir Kanna	Teardrops Of Karnaphuli	Script/Direction	A documentary on the plight of the Chakma, Marma, Tripura, Mrung and other indigenous people of the Chittagong Hill Tracts. The documentary was banned by the government of Bangladesh.
2005	Bonojatri	Riders To The Sunderbans	Script/Direction	A documentary film on the Sunderbans
2007	Bostrobalikara	Garment Girls of Bangladesh	Script/Direction	Won- Best documentary film of the year by Bangladesh Federation of Film Societies.
2007	Nissonga Sarathi	Tajuddin Ahmad: An Unsung Hero	Script/Direction	A documentary about Tajuddin Ahmad, the first premier of Bangladesh.
2007	Swapnabhumi	The Promised Land	Script/Direction	Won - Second Best Documentary Film by Film South Asia Film Festival, 2009, Nepal.
2008	Rabeya	The Sister	Script/Direction	A deconstruction of Sophocles's play "Antigone" on the backdrop of the Bangladesh liberation war of 1971.
2011	1971	1971	Script/Direction	A mega-documentary on the liberation war of Bangladesh.
2012	Japani Bodhu	The Japanese Wife	Script/Direction	A documentary on Hariprobha Takeda, the first Bengali woman who wrote a travelogue on Japan and used to read Bengali news from Tokyo Radio for Subash Bose's Azad Hind Fauz.
2014	Jibondhuli	The Drummer	Script/Direction	A feature film on the liberation war of Bangladesh in 1971.
2017	Seemantorekha	The Borderline	Script/Direction	A documentary film on the Partition of Bengal in 1947.
2020	Rupsha Nodir Banke	Quite flows the river Rupsha	Script/Direction	A biographical film on the life of a leftist
2023	Titas Parer Manushti: Shaheed Dhirendranath Dutta	Martyr Dhirendranath Dutta	Script/Direction	A documentary on martyr Dhirendranath Dutta.
2025	Sojan Badiar Ghat		Script/Direction	A Feature-length film in development.

== Awards and honors ==
Mokammel received Ekushey Padak, the second highest civilian award in 2017 for notable contribution in Bengali film.

Year	Award	Category	Nominated work	Result
1995	National Film Award	Best Story	Nodir Naam Modhumoti	Won
1995	National Film Award	Best Dialogue	Nodir Naam Modhumoti	Won
1999	National Film Award	Best Film	Chitra Nodir Pare	Won
1999	National Film Award	Best Director	Chitra Nodir Pare	Won
1999	National Film Award	Best Story	Chitra Nodir Pare	Won
1999	National Film Award	Best Dialogue	Chitra Nodir Pare	Won
2001	National Film Award	Best Film	Lalsalu	Won
2001	National Film Award	Best Director	Lalsalu	Won
2001	National Film Award	Best Dialogue	Lalsalu	Won
2007	Chalachchitram Padak	lifetime achievement		Won

== Publications ==
1. Chalachitra Nondontottwo o Barojon Director (Film Aesthetics and Twelve Directors); 1985, Sahitya Prakashoni, ISBN 9789844250208
2. Chalachitra (Film); 1987, Bangla Academy
3. Marxbad O Sahitya (Marxism and Literature)
4. Syed Waliullah, Sisyphus and Quest for Tradition in Novel; 1988, Muktodhara.
5. Nitchutalar Manush, translation of Maxim Gorky's play The Lower Depths; 1997, Bishwo Shahitto Kendro, ISBN 9841800667 .
6. Charlie Chaplin: Triumph of the Tramp (Bhabaghurer Digbijoy), in Bengali, on the life and craft of Charlie Chaplin as an actor and film-maker, Sahitya Prakasoni, 1996.
7. Grundtvig and Gonoshikhsa, a book on the theories of alternative education for the downtrodden and disadvantaged people of the rural areas, 1997.
8. Art of Cinema (Cinemar Shilparup), in Bengali, a collection of essays on different aspects of the aesthetics of cinema, 1998, Agamee Prakashani
