= Sadika Parvin Popy =

Bangladeshi actress (born 1979)

Popy
- পপি
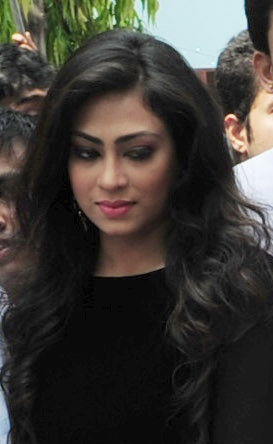
- Popy in 2015
- Born: Sadika Parvin Popy; 10 September 1979 (age 47); Khulna, Bangladesh
- Occupations: Actress, model
- Years active: 1997–present
- Relatives: Moushumi (cousin), Erin Zaman (cousin)
- Awards: full list

Sadika Parvin Popy (born 10 September 1979) known mononymously as Popy, is a leading Bangladeshi film actress. She won Bangladesh National Film Award for Best Actress three times for the films Karagar (2003), Megher Koley Rod (2008) and Gangajatra (2009)

Popy debuted with blockbuster, which went on to become one of highest grossing movies of 1990's, i.e. Coolie. She continued her iconic career and established herself as among most popular and successful actress in Dhallywood with movies such as Amar Ghor Amar Behesht, Borsha Badol, Milon Malar Prem, Bidroho Charidike, Ke Amar Baba, Dujon Dujonar, and Praner Priyotoma.

Further with a new decade 2000s, she continued to be successful and eventually started in movies where she won the Juari, Sei Tufan, Oder Dhor, Villain, Kuddhe Juddha, Ki Jadu Korila, Churmar, Gangajatra, Shami Amar Behest, Ma Amar Behest, Daku Rani, Shami Hara Sundori, City Terror, Bostir Rani Suriya, Bissho Batpar, and Garments Konna. However, after 2014, she has slowly disappeared from Dhallywood to focus of marital affairs, family, and other ventures.

== Early life ==
A native of Khulna, she attended the National Girls' School, Gobar Chakas, Khulna.

== Career ==
Popy's first role was in director Sohanur Rahman Sohan's film Amar Ghor Amar Behesht, but before it was released she made her film debut in Coolie (1997), directed by Montazur Rahman Akbar. She performed with Shakib Khan in his second film Dujon Dujonar in 1999. At her prime, she did over 250 films as a leading actress. Popy debuted in television drama in Nayak, directed by Shahidul Islam Khan. She performed in the web series, Garden and Indubala.

== Filmography ==
Year	Film	Role	Notes	Ref.
1997	Coolie	Poppy	Debut film	
1997	Amar Ghor Amar Behesht			
1998	Bidroho Charidike	Moshal		
1998	Ei Mon Tomake Dilam	Kajol		
1998	Maa Jokhon Bicharok			
1998	Praner Priyotoma			
1998	Ke Amar Baba			
1998	Amar Bou			
1999	Jibon Chabi			
1999	Dujon Dujonar	Jhinuk		
2000	Borsha Badol			
2001	Daku Rani	Rani		
2002	Khepa Basu			
2002	Oder Dhor	Riya		
2002	Bissho Batpar			
2002	Dosshu	Sonali		
2003	Karagar			
2003	Khomotar Dapot			
2004	Bostir Rani Suriya	Suriya		
2005	Bisakto Chokh: The Blue Eye	Rani		
2005	City Terror	Tania		
2005	Prem Korechi Besh Korechi			
2005	Norok	Shikha		
2006	Bidrohi Padma	Sudha		
2006	Dapot	Ria		
2007	Jhontu Montu Dui Bhai			
2007	Rani Kuthir Baki Itihash	Momo		
2007	Jomoj	Jui		
2008	Megher Koley Roud	Rodela		
2008	Ki Jadu Korila	Jhinuk		
2009	Gangajatra	Sudha		
2012	Garments Konna	Brishti		
2014	Char Okkhorer Bhalobasha	Bhabna		
2015	Dui Beayar Kirti			
2016	Poush Maser Pirit	Majhu Khatun		
2017	Shona Bondhu	Rushni		
2019	The Director			
2025	Direct Attack	ACDB Sohana		

=== Web series ===
Year	Title	OTT	Character	Co-Artist	Director	Notes
2019	Garden Game	Bioscope	Brita	Riaz, Nipun	Towhid Mitul	
2020	Indubala		Razia "Indubala" Shikder	ABM Sumon, Achol, Tariq Anam Khan, Shahiduzzaman Selim	Anonno Mamun	

== Awards ==
National Film Awards

Year	Award	Category	Film	Result
2003	National Film Award	Best Actress	Karagar	Won
2008	National Film Award	Best Actress	Megher Koley Roud	Won
2009	National Film Award	Best Actress	Gongajatra	Won
