= '71 Er Ma Jononi =

2014 Bangladeshi film

- Poster
- Bengali: '৭১ এর মা জননী
- Directed by: Shah Alam Kiron
- Screenplay by: Shah Alam Kiron
- Story by: Anisul Haque
- Produced by: Faridur Reza Sagor
- Starring: Nipun Akter; Agun; Chitralekha Guho
- Cinematography: Mahfuzur Rahman Khan
- Edited by: Mujibur Rahman Dulu
- Music by: Shujeo Shyam; Emon Saha
- Distributed by: Impress Telefilms
- Release date: 16 December 2014
- Country: Bangladesh
- Language: Bengali

'71 Er Ma Jononi (Bengali: '৭১ এর মা জননী) is a 2014 Bangladeshi drama film directed by Shah Alam Kiron, and starring Nipun Akter. The film is centered on the 1971 Bangladesh War of Independence and based on a book written by Anisul Haque, Jononi Shahoshini 71. The Government funded this film and was produced by Impress telefilm. This film shows the story of heroines, who joined Bangladesh liberation war. Nipun Akter plays the lead heroine role, while her husband's role was played by singer Khan Asif Agun. Apart from that, some other actors like M M Morshed, Shakil Ahmed, Chitralekha Guho, Mishu Choudhary and Gulshon Ara also played supporting roles. Chitralekha Guho was awarded Best Supporting Actress at the 39th Bangladesh National Film Awards.

== Cast ==
The film stars Khan Asifur Rahman Agoon (Agun) and Nipun Akter in the lead roles. Other actors include Chitralekha Guha, M. M. Morshed, Gulshan Ara, Mishu, Rakib, Abdul Halim Aziz, Smaran, Murshed Alam, Sarwar Alam Soikat, Likhan, Mahbub, Elina Parvez, Rima, Ishita Payel, Soma Ferdous, Mima Jaman Tithi, and Sohan.

== Soundtrack ==
No.	Title	Lyrics	Music	singer	Length
1.	"Ekti Swadhin Desh"	Munshi Wadid	Shujeo Shyam	Andrew Kishore
2.	"'71 Er Maa Jononi Tumi"	Munshi Wadud	Shujeo Shyam	Andrew Kishore

== Awards ==
39th Bangladesh National Film Awards

- Winner: Best Supporting Actress - Chitralekha Guha
