= Sudhendu Roy =

Indian film director (1921–1999)

- Born: 1921; Pabna, Bengal Presidency, British India
- Died: 1999 (aged 77–78); Mumbai, Maharashtra, India
- Occupations: film director; art director; production designer
- Years active: 1948–1999
- Known for: Madhumati (1959), Bandini (1963), Saudagar (1973)
- Children: 3, including Sharmishta Roy

Sudhendu Roy (1921–1999) was a noted Indian film director, art director and production designer in Hindi cinema, most known for his realistic art direction in auteur Bimal Roy's films, like Sujata (1959), Madhumati (1959) and Bandini (1963), and glitzy work in films Subhash Ghai's Karz (1980) and Karma (1986) to Yash Chopra's Silsila (1981), Chandni (1989) and Lamhe (1991). He won the Filmfare Award for Best Art Direction thrice for, Madhumati (1959), Mere Mehboob (1964) and Sagina (1975).

He also directed Hindi films like Uphaar (1971) and Saudagar (1973), both of which were India's official entry to the Academy Award for Best Foreign Language Film.

== Early life ==
Sudhendu Roy was born and brought up in Pabna (now in Bangladesh), where his father Puranchandra Roy was a lawyer by profession from eastern Bengal, who was also a writer and even took part in the freedom movement, and wanted his son to study law, young Roy had other plans, so he took his admission fees to join a law college in Kolkata, and ran away from home, never to go back.

== Career ==
A self-taught man, he started his career as a commercial artist. He struggled for some years, and later joined Bengali cinema in Kolkata as an art director. After meeting, Parimal Roy, brother and cameraman of film director, Bimal Roy, he did Anjangarh (1948) produced by New Theatres and directed by Bimal Roy. The film was a commercial success and thus started a collaboration which lasted the rest of Bimal Roy's film career. In the following years he worked with directors like Tapan Sinha and Hiten Choudhary. Finally Bimal Roy left Kolkata in early 1950s, and shifted to Hindi cinema, he too shifted base to Mumbai as a part of his team, making his debut in Hindi cinema with Biraj Bahu (1954), Madhumati (1958), Yahudi (1958), Sujata (1959) and Bandini (1963), after this Bimal Roy died in 1966, though made a small film Benazir (1964).

At the peak of his career as an art director, he was offered, Uphaar (1971) by Tarachand Barjatya of Rajshri Productions, the film was based on Rabindranath Tagore's story Samapti and had Jaya Bachchan in her first solo lead. Later it was chosen India's entry to the Academy Award for Best Foreign Language Film. This was followed by Saudagar (1973), based on Bengali story, Ras by Narendranath Mitra and starring Nutan, Amitabh Bachchan and Padma Khanna as leads, the film was not a commercial success, but received much critical acclaim, and also became India's entry to the Academy Award for Best Foreign Language Film. His two others films, based on his own stories, Sweekar (1973) and Jeevan Mukt (1977). Lastly, he made a romantic comedy, Aap Ki Khatir (1977) with Vinod Khanna and Rekha as lead, featuring hit song, Bombai se Aaya Mera Dost.

Thereafter, he continued working as a production designer for the next two-decade, cross genres and collaborating as new generation of film directors, Subhash Ghai and Yash Johar, in films like Don (1978), Karz (1980), Shakti (1982), Karma (1986), Chandni (1989), Agneepath (1990), Lamhe (1991) and Darr (1993). He created an unparalleled association with Yash Chopra which was carried out, after him, by his daughter who also worked with the Chopra's for two decades and received numerous accolades for her work with them.

== Personal life ==
While working in film industry, he befriended noted art director Ganesh Basak, who worked on Bimal Roy's film, Do Bigha Zameen (1953) and Nagina (1986). Later Roy married his sister Krishna. Out of their three children, his youngest daughter, Sharmishta Roy is also an art director in Hindi cinema, and assisted him in her early career, before starting independently, receiving Filmfare Award for Dil To Pagal Hai (1998), Kuch Kuch Hota Hai (1999), Kabhi Khushi Kabhie Gham (2002). and the National Film Award for Best Production Design for Meenaxi: A Tale of Three Cities (2003). His son Krishnendu runs an animation studio, and one daughter, Sumona, lives in Canada.

== Filmography ==
Director

- Uphaar (1971)
- Saudagar (1973)
- Sweekar (1973)
- Jeevan Mukt (1977)
- Aap Ki Khatir (1977)

Art Director

- Anjangarh (1948)
- Biraj Bahu (1954)
- Madhumati (1958)
- Yahudi (1958)
- Sujata (1959)
- Parakh (1960)
- Memdidi (1961)
- Aas Ka Panchhi (1961)
- Kabuliwala (1961)
- Mujhe Jeene Do (1963)
- Mere Mehboob (1963)
- Bandini (1963)
- Arzoo (1965)
- Aankhen (1968)
- Brahmachari (1968)
- Aya Sawan Jhoom Ke (1969)
- Sawan Bhadon (1970)
- Safar (1970)
- Pavitra Paapi (1970)
- Heer Raanjha (1970)
- Aan Milo Sajna (1970)
- Dastak (1970)
- Saudagar (1973)
- Sagina (1974)
- Aap Ki Kasam (1974)
- Bidaai (1974)
- Laila Majnu (1976)
- Don (1978)
- Trishna (1978)
- Kali Ghata (1980)
- Aasha (1980)
- Karz (1980)
- Kudrat (1981)
- Rocky (1981)
- Ek Duuje Ke Liye (1981)
- Silsila (1981)
- Shakti (1982)
- Sawaal (1982)
- Himmatwala (1983)
- Swarag Se Sunder (1986)
- Dharm Adhikari (1986)
- Swati (1986)
- Naache Mayuri (1986)
- Karma (1986)
- Samundar (1986)
- Sansar (1987)
- Hifazat (1987)
- Himmat Aur Mehanat (1987)
- Joshilaay (1989)
- Kasam Suhaag Ki (1989)
- Rakhwala (1989)
- Chandni (1989)
- Kanoon Apna Apna (1989)
- Bhrashtachar (1989)
- Agneepath (1990)
- Benaam Badsha (1991)
- Akayla (1991)
- Lamhe (1991)
- Parampara (1993)
- Sahibaan (1993)
- Aaina (1993)
- Darr (1993)
- Anjaam (1994)
- Pehla Pehla Pyar (1994)
- Aag (1994)
- English Babu Desi Mem (1996)
- Vijeta (1996)
- Majhdhaar (1996)

Writer

- Paraya Dhan (1971)
- Saudagar (1973)

== Awards ==
- Filmfare Award for Best Art Direction
  - 1959: Madhumati
  - 1964: Mere Mehboob
  - 1975: Sagina
