= Saudagar (1973 film) =

- Theatrical release poster
- Directed by: Sudhendu Roy
- Written by: Sudhendu Roy (screenplay); P.L. Santoshi (dialogues)
- Story by: Ras by Narendranath Mitra
- Produced by: Tarachand Barjatya
- Starring: Nutan; Amitabh Bachchan; Padma Khanna
- Cinematography: Dilip Ranjan Mukhopadhyay
- Edited by: Mukhtar Ahmed
- Music by: Ravindra Jain
- Production company: Rajshri Productions
- Release date: 14 September 1973
- Running time: 131 minutes
- Country: India
- Language: Hindi

Saudagar (transl. Trader) is a 1973 Bollywood drama film, directed by Sudhendu Roy and based on the Bengali story, Ras, by Narendranath Mitra. It stars Nutan as Mahzubeen and Amitabh Bachchan as Moti, in the leading roles. It also featured Trilok Kapoor, and Padma Khanna as Phoolbanu. Murad, Leela Mishra as (Badi Bhi), Dev Kishan, Jugnu and V. Gopal are also featured in the film. Though the film didn't do well commercially, it was selected as the Indian entry for the Best Foreign Language Film at the 46th Academy Awards, but didn't receive a nomination.

== Plot ==
Moti is a famous"gur" (unrefined concentrated date palm juice) trader of Sultanganj who trades in the seasonal gur made of "Khajur" (date-palm). During the offseason, he meets a girl, Phoolbanu, and falls in love with her. Moti approaches Phoolbanu's father, who asks for mehar (bride price), which he does not have.

Majubee, a widow who is Moti's business associate, prepares the gur for him to sell. Her gur (and consequently Moti's) is very famous and people always prefer to buy from Moti. Moti decides to marry Majubee so that he does not have to pay her, and hence can save more and sooner. Majubee, unaware of Moti's ulterior motive, is first surprised by the proposal, but later accepts it. At the end of the season, Moti saves enough for the meher and divorces Majubee with pretext that she has illicit relationship with her much respected brother in law. Majubee being shocked has cursed Moti before leaving.

This incident shocks Majubee and people of the community. Moti meets Phoolbanu's father and asks again for his daughter's hand. Satisfied with the meher, he marries off his daughter (Phoolbanu) to Moti. Side by side, Moti was using all the money he has earned with the help of Majubee and was taking more debt after marriage with Phool banu for a luxurious lifestyle. Meanwhile, a fish trader (Nadeer) asks Majubee to marry him. He is honest with her, explaining that he has small children and wants Majubee to look after them. He always treats her with courtesy.As a result, Majubee has left for another village. All is fine till the Gur season arrives. Phoolbanu is terrible at making Gur, and Moti's customers stop buying from his shop.

It is almost the end of the gur season, and Moti does not make a good profit that year. One day Phoolbanu making the gur leaves in between to take bath when Moti arrives and sees the gur has been burnt. He badly beats Phoolbanu with a stick. Thereafter, his father in law arrived for reconciliation and they again started living together.

But one morning Moti while collecting the sap from the palm tree gradually realises his mistake. He arrived at home without any plant sap for gur manufacturing. Phoolbanu(Phooljan) asked him where are the today's sap. Moti said he left the work of gur manufacturing. Realising that Moti is upset and totally broken Phoolbanu left for her father's home. Simultaneously on the way Phoolbanu saw Moti coming with plant sap but gradually realises that he is going somewhere else. Phoolbanu followed him on th way and realised that Moti is going to Majubee's house. Moti has finally realised his mistake. He takes two cans of date-nectar and approaches Majubee at her husband's house to request her to make him some Gur to sell. At first, Majubee is very angry upon seeing Moti, but she understands that he is in a pitiful condition and is indirectly begging for her forgiveness. She also sees Phoolbanu listening to everything from behind a fence. As the eyes of the two ladies meet, they start weeping and hug each other affectionately.

== Cast ==
- Nutan as Mahjabeen "Maju", Moti's former wife.
- Amitabh Bachchan as Motallib a.k.a. Moti
- Trilok Kapoor as Nadeer
- Padma Khanna as Phoolbanu "Phool jaan"
- Murad as Sheikh
- Leela Mishra as Badi Bhi
- Dev Kishan as Waheed Bhaijan, Razak's elder brother
- Jugnu as Usman
- V. Gopal as Gafoor
- C.S. Dubey as Banerjee
- Yunus Bihari as buyer
- H.L. Pardesi as Sikandar
- Paro as Khaala
- Habiba Rehman as village girl
- Narbada Shankar as Mallik babu
- Shriram Shastri as Sadan babu
- Suraiya as villager

== Music ==
The music for the film was composed by the versatile composer Late Ravindra Jain. Lyrics were also by Ravindra Jain. He composed several memorable songs for the movie, notably:

1. "Har Haseen Cheez Ka" - Kishore Kumar
2. "Sajana Hain Mujhe Sajna Ke Liye" - Asha Bhosle
3. "Kyon Laayo Sainya Paan" - Asha Bhosle
4. "Husn Hain Ya Koi Qayamat Hain" - Mohammed Rafi, Aarti Mukherjee
5. "Door Hain Kinara" - Manna Dey
6. "Tera Mera Saath Rahe" - Lata Mangeshkar
7. "Main hoon Phool Banu" - Lata Mangeshkar

== See also ==
- List of submissions to the 46th Academy Awards for Best Foreign Language Film
- List of Indian submissions for the Academy Award for Best Foreign Language Film
