= Shujeo Shyam =

Bangladeshi singer, composer and music director (1946–2024)

- সুজেয় শ্যাম
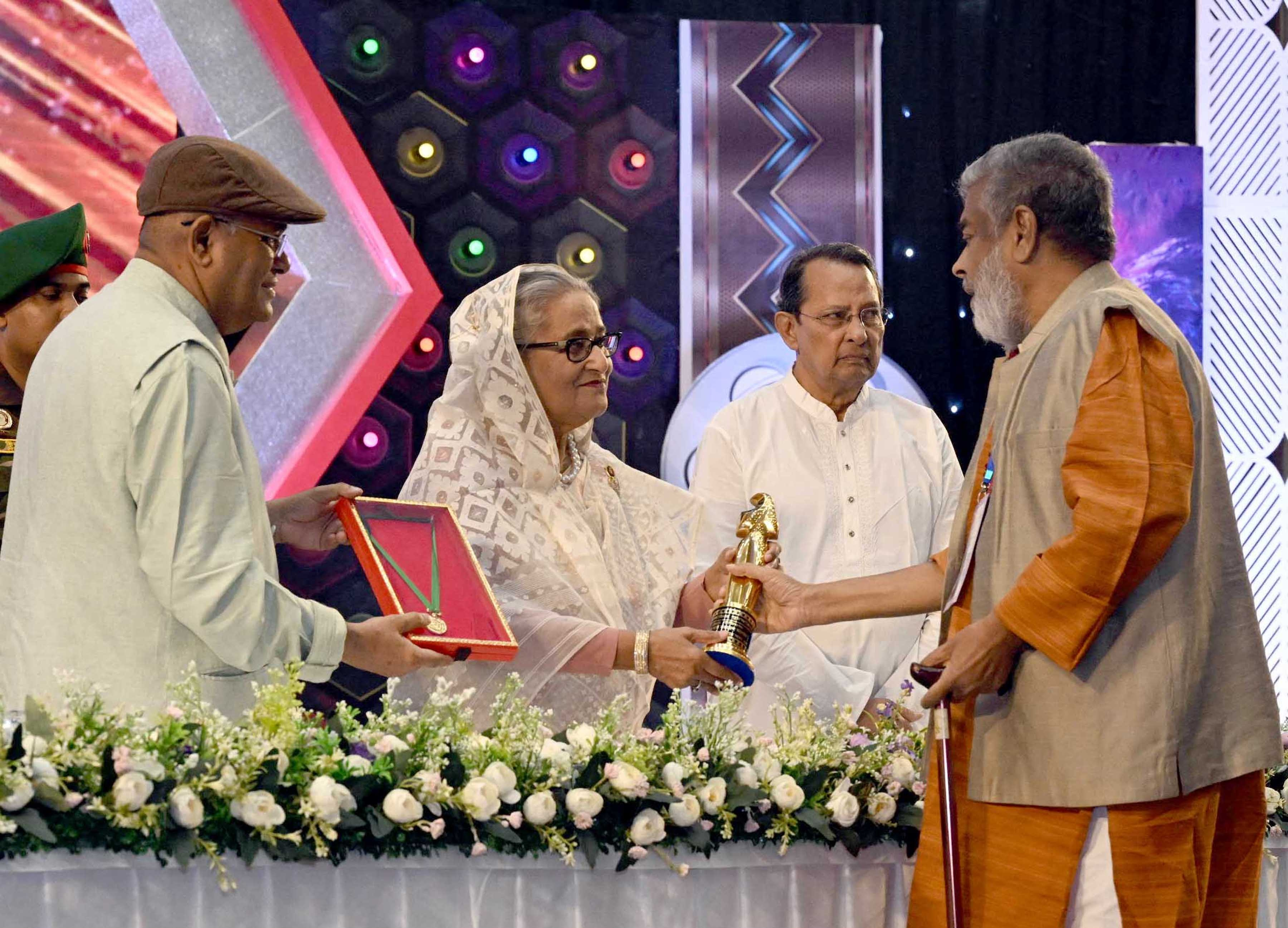
- Shyam (right) receiving National Film Award from Sheikh Hasina (2023)
- Born: 14 March 1946; Sylhet, Bengal Province, British India
- Died: 18 October 2024 (aged 78); Dhaka, Bangladesh
- Occupations: Singer, composer, music director
- Awards: Full list

Shujeo Shyam (14 March 1946 – 18 October 2024) was a Bangladeshi singer, composer, and music director. He won Bangladesh National Film Award for Best Music Director four times for the films Hason Raja (2002), Joyjatra (2004), Obujh Bou (2010) and Joiboti Konyar Mon (2021). He was awarded Ekushey Padak in 2018 by the Government of Bangladesh.

== Life and career ==
Shyam was born in Sylhet, Bengal Province, British India on 14 March 1946.

From April 1971, he was involved with Swadhin Bangla Betar Kendra. His work at the radio station included "Rokto Diye Naam Likhechi," "Rokto Chai Rokto Chai," "Aha Dhonno Amar Jonmobhumi," and "Ayre Chashi Mojur Kuli".

Shyam directed and composed the song "Bijoy Nishan Ureche Oi," - lyrics written by Shahidul Amin and sung by Ajit Roy.

Shyam had a daughter, Rupa Manjuri Shyam. Shujeo Shyam died on 17 October 2024, while undergoing treatment at Bangabandhu Sheikh Mujib Medical University in Dhaka. He was 78.

== Awards ==
- Shilpakala Padak (2015)
- Bangladesh National Film Award for Best Music Director
  - 2002 for Hason Raja
  - 2004 for Joyjatra
  - 2010 for Abujh Bou
  - 2021 for Joiboti Konyar Mon
- Ekushey Padak (2018)

== Discography ==
Year	Film	Notes
1975	Sadhu Shoytan	composed with Raja Hossain Khan
1992	Rupban Kanya	
2002	Hason Raja	Winner: Bangladesh National Film Award for Best Music Director
2004	Joyjatra	Winner: Bangladesh National Film Award for Best Music Director
2010	Abujh Bou	Winner: Bangladesh National Film Award for Best Music Director
2012	Antardhan	
2014	'71 Er Maa Jononi	composed with Emon Saha
2014	Ekattorer Khudiram	
2021	Joiboti Konyar Mon	
