= Nargis Akhter =

Bangladeshi film director

- নারগিস আক্তার
- Born: 20 November; Dhaka, Bangladesh
- Education: University of Dhaka
- Occupations: Film director, screenwriter, producer
- Years active: 2001–present
- Notable work: Meghla Akash; Megher Koley Rod; Abujh Bou
- Awards: National Film Awards (2 times)

Nargis Akhter is a Bangladeshi film director, screenwriter and producer. Her first directed film was Meghla Akash. After her first film, she directed various films including Megher Koley Rod (2008), Abujh Bou (2010), and Poush Maser Pirit (2016).

She won twice National Film Award for the Best Screenplay category for the film Meghla Akash and Abujh Bou. She is the first Bangladeshi woman to receive national and international film awards.

== Early life ==
Akhter was born in Dhaka Medical College Hospital. Her ancestral home is in Madaripur. She graduated from Dhaka University with a degree in social welfare. She gained early experience making television documentaries for a development organization. Her first, Ajana Ghatak, on the subject of HIV AIDS, was broadcast in 1996.

== Filmography ==
Year	Film	Director	Screenwriter	Dialogue writer	Producer	Notes
2001	Meghla Akash	Yes	Yes	Yes	No	
2005	Char Satiner Ghar	Yes	Yes	No	Yes	
2008	Megher Koley Rod	Yes	Yes	No	Yes	
2010	Abujh Bou	Yes	Yes	Yes	No	
2015	Putro Ekhon Poyshawala	Yes	Yes	Yes	No	
2016	Poush Maser Pirit	Yes	Yes	Yes	No	
2021	Jaibati Kanyar Mon	Yes	Yes	Yes	No	

== Television ==
Year	Show	Host	Channel	Notes
2014	Citycell Taroka Kathon		Channel i	Live show
2014	Bela Seshe		SA TV	

== Awards ==
National Film Awards

Year	Category	Film	Results
2003	Best Screenwriter	Meghla Akash (2001)	Won
2012	Best Screenwriter	Abujh Bou (2010)	Won
