= Lalon (film) =

Bangladeshi film

Lalon লালন
- Film poster
- Directed by: Tanvir Mokammel
- Starring: Raisul Islam Asad; Azad Abul Kalam; Shomi Kaiser
- Release date: 2004
- Running time: 140 minutes
- Country: Bangladesh
- Language: Bengali

Lalon (Bengali: লালন) is a 2004 Bangladeshi film directed by Tanvir Mokammel. The film won Bangladesh National Film Award for Best Art Direction at the 29th Bangladesh National Film Awards.

== Plot ==
The plot is mainly based on the life of Bengali mystic poet Fakir Lalon.

== Cast ==
- Raisul Islam Asad as Lalon
- Azad Abul Kalam as Young Lalon
- Shomi Kaiser as Piyarinnesa
- Wahida Mollick Jolly
- Ramendu Majumdar
- Khurshiduzzaman Utpal
- Naresh Bhuiyan
