= Chitra Nodir Pare =

- Bengali: চিত্রা নদীর পারে
- Directed by: Tanvir Mokammel
- Written by: Tanvir Mokammel
- Produced by: Tanvir Mokammel
- Starring: Momtajuddin Ahmed; Afsana Mimi; Rawshan Jamil; Tauquir Ahmed; Sumita Devi; Nazmul Huda
- Edited by: Mahadeb Shi
- Music by: Syed Shabab Ali Arzoo
- Release date: 1999
- Running time: 114 minutes
- Country: Bangladesh
- Language: Bengali

Chitra Nodir Pare (Bengali: চিত্রা নদীর পারে, known in English as Quiet Flows the River Chitra) is a Bangladeshi Bengali language film on the destiny of a Hindu family in East Pakistan. Directed by Tanvir Mokammel, the film won seven national awards including the best film and the best director of the year 1999. Other awards were best Story, best Dialogue, best Art-Director, best Supporting Actress and best Make-up Man. The film was shown in London, Oslo, Fribourg (Switzerland), Singapore, Delhi, Calcutta and Trivandrum film festivals.

== Cast ==
- Momtajuddin Ahmed – Shashikanta Sengupta
- Afsana Mimi – Minoti
- Tauquir Ahmed – Badal
- Rawshan Jamil – Anuprova
- Sumita Devi
- Nazmul Huda

== Soundtrack ==
The music of this film was directed by Syed Shabab Ali Arzoo.

== Response ==
Film critic Ahmed Muztaba Zamal, writing in Cinemaya in 2000, named Chitra Nodir Pare as one of the top twelve films from Bangladesh.

== Awards ==
Award Title	Category	Awardee	Result
National Film Awards	Best Film	Tanvir Mokammel (Producer)	Won
National Film Awards	Best Director	Tanvir Mokammel	Won
National Film Awards	Best Supporting Actress	Rawshan Jamil	Won
National Film Awards	Best Story	Tanvir Mokammel	Won
National Film Awards	Best Dialogue	Tanvir Mokammel	Won
National Film Awards	Best Art Direction	Uttom Guha	Won
National Film Awards	Best Makeup	Dipak Kumar Sur	Won

== See also ==
- Srabon Megher Din (1999)
