= Meghla Akash =

2002 Bangladeshi film

- VCD cover
- Directed by: Nargis Akhtar
- Written by: Masum Reza
- Produced by: Nargis Akhtar
- Starring: Moushumi; Ayub Khan; Shakil Khan; Purnima; Amit Hasan; Neelam Sing; Rajib; Ferdousi Mazumder; Shahidul Alam Shachhu; Dildar
- Cinematography: Mahfuzur Rahman Khan
- Edited by: Mujibur Rahman Dulu
- Music by: Alauddin Ali
- Release date: 2002
- Running time: 137 minutes
- Country: Bangladesh
- Language: Bengali

Meghla Akash also (Bengali: মেঘলা আকাশ, English: The Cloudy Sky) is a Bangladeshi Bengali language film. The film was directed by Bangladeshi filmmaker Nargis Akter as her first directed film. It was released in 2002 all over Bangladesh. This thought has brought forward Nargis Akhter's first feature film Meghla Akash that deals with the issue of HIV/AIDS prevention and control. It stars Moushumi, Ayub Khan, Amit Hasan, Shakil Khan, Purnima, Wasimul Bari Rajib, Shahidul Alam Sachchu, Ferdousi Mazumder, Pijush Bandyopadhyay and many more. Public consciousness based the films special appearance Indian actress Shabana Azmi The film was appreciated by film critics and film viewers and won the National Film Award of Bangladesh as best director Nargis Akter of the year 2002, with won a total of six categories.

== Synopsis ==
Meghla (Moushumi), a beautiful girl, is in love with Moni (Amit Hasan). However, Mohit's father rejects Meghla because her uncle cannot afford a dowry. Meghla leaves her village, heartbroken. Khoybor, an evil man, tricks her by offering to find her a job. Then he sells her into prostitution.

== Cast ==
- Moushumi as Meghla
- Ayub Khan as Jabed Ahmed
- Shakil Khan as Tingku
- Purnima as Rimi
- Amit Hasan as Moni
- Neelam Sing as Jabed's girl friend
- Rajib as Hawlader
- Ferdousi Mazumder as prostitution leader
- Shahidul Alam Shachhu as Koybar Molla
- Dildar as police constable
- Syed Hasan Imam
- Dolly Zahur as Meghla's aunt
- Amol Bose as Moni's father
- Jahanara Bhuiyan
- Probir Mitra as Dr. Mitra
- Pijush Bandyopadhyay as Baker Shakib
- Sirajul Islam
- Anis as Kazi
- Shabana Azmi as virology doctor (special appearance)

== Awards and achievement ==
=== National Film Awards ===
Meghla Akash won the National Film Awards total six categories in the year of 2002.

- Winner Best screenplay : 'Nargis Aktar' 2002
- Winner Best Actress: 'Moushumi ' 2002

== Music ==
The music was arranged and conducted by Bangladeshi music director Alauddin Ali; lyrics were provided by Mohammad Rafiquzzaman. Playback singers were as follows:

- Mitali Mukharjee
- Protik Dey
- Khalid Hasan Milu
- Ragob Chowdhury.
