= List of Bangladeshi patriotic songs =

Most of the Bangladeshi patriotic songs were written during 1971 War of Independence, to inspire the freedom fighters.

This is a list of Bangladeshi patriotic songs.

- "Aar Juddho Noy"
- "Akbar Jete Dena" - sung by Sabina Yasmin and Shahnaz Rahmatullah in different versions
- "Aktara Tui Deser Kotha" - sung by Sabina Yasmin and Shahnaz Rahmatullah in different versions
- "Akti Bangladesh" - written by Noyeem Gahar and sung by Sabina Yasmin and Konok Chapa in different versions
- "Amar Desher Matir Gondhe"
- "Amar Shonar Bangla" - National anthem of Bangladesh, written by Rabindranath Tagore
- "Amar Vaier Rokte Rangano" - written by Abdul Gaffar Chowdhury and composed by Altaf Mahmud during 1952 Bengali language movement.
- "Amay Jodi Prosno Kore" - sung by Sabina Yasmin
- "Ami Banglai Gaan Gaai"- composed by Pratul Mukhopadday
- "Ami Bhalobashi Ei Banglake"
- "Bangladesh" - by Ayub Bachchu
- "Bhalobashi Deshta Amar"
- "Ei Padhama Ei Meghna"
- "Eki Oporup Rupe Ma Tor" - sung by Konok Chapa
- "Ek Nodi Rokta Periye" - sung by Shahnaz Rahmatullah
- "Ek Sagar Rokter Binimoye"
- "Bangladesh" - written by Prince Mahmood sung by James
- "Jodi Abar Ashte Pari"
- "Jonmo Amar Dhonno Holo Maago" - Written by Nayeem Gahar and sung by Sabina Yasmin and Konok Chapa- in different versions
- "Joy Bangla, Banglar Joy" - written by Gazi Mazharul Anwar
- "Karar Oi Louho Kopath"
- "Moder Gorob Moder Asha" - written by Atulprasad Sen
- "Mora Ekti Ful Ke" -
- "Amar Aat Koti Ful" -
- "Amar Bangla Ma Tor"
- "O Amar Desher Mati" by Rabindranath Tagore
- "Polash Dake Kokoil Dake"
- Praner Anonde Baje" -
- "Purbo Digonte Surjo Utheche" - written and composed by Gautam Haldar
- Shadhinota Tomake Niye"
- "Sobkota Janala Khule Dau Na" - sung by Sabina Yasmin
- Sobujer Buke Lal - Milton Khondokar
- "O Alor Pothojatri" - sung by Manna Dey
- "Muktir Gaan"
- "Ek Sagor Rokter Binimoye" - sung by Shahin Samad
