= 47th Bangladesh National Film Awards =

National Film Awards, Bangladesh

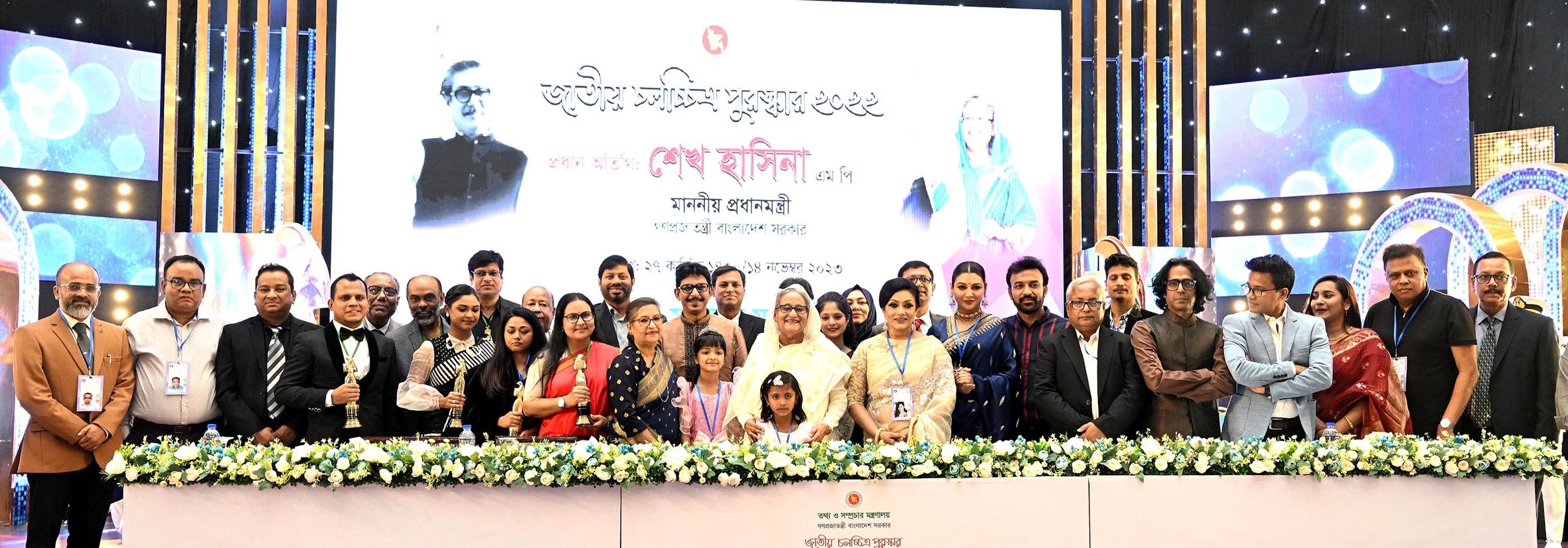
- Award ceremony held on 14 November 2023
- Awarded for: Best of Bangladeshi cinema in 2022
- Awarded by: Prime minister of Bangladesh
- Presented by: Ministry of Information
- Announced on: 31 October 2023
- Presented on: 14 November 2023

Highlights
- Best Feature Film: Kura Pokkhir Shunne Ura and Poran
- Best Actor: Chanchal Chowdhury
- Best Actress: Jaya Ahsan and Rikita Nandini Shimu
- Lifetime achievement: Kamrul Alam Khan Khasru and Rozina

The 47th National Film Awards was presented by Ministry of Information, Bangladesh to felicitate the best of Bangladeshi films released in the calendar year 2022. The list of winners were declared on 31 October 2023. and presented on 14 November 2023.

== Jury board ==
On 27 March 2023, the ministry formed a 13-member jury board. Jury members included Mushfiqur Rahman Gulzar, Hasan Motiur Rahman, Pankaj Palit, Dolly Johur, Naquib Khan, Monjurul Ahsan Bulbul and Riaz Ahamed.

== Lifetime Achievement ==
Award	Winner(s)	Awarded As
Lifetime Achievement	Rozina	Actor
Lifetime Achievement	Kamrul Alam Khan Khasru	Actor

== List of winners ==
Award	Winner(s)	Film
Best Film	Mohammad Abdul Qayyum; Md Tamzid Ul Alam	Kura Pokkhir Shunne Ura; Poran
Best Short Film	S M Kamrul Ahsan Lenin	Ghore Fera
Best Documentary Film	A J M Shafiul Alam Bhuiyan	Bangabandhu and Dhaka University
Best Director	Rubaiyat Hossain	Shimu
Best Actor	Chanchal Chowdhury	Hawa
Best Actress	Jaya Ahsan; Reekita Nondine Shimu	Beauty Circus; Shimu
Best Supporting Actor	Nasir Uddin Khan	Poran
Best Supporting Actress	Afsana Mimi	Paap Punno
Best Actor/Actress in Negative Role	Subhasish Bhowmik	Deshantor
Best Actor/Actress in Comedy Role	Deepu Imam	Operation Sundarbans
Best Child Artist	Bristi Akther; Muntaha Amelia	Rohingya; Birotto
Best Child Artist in Special Category	Farzina Akhtar	Kura Pokkhir Shunne Ura
Best Music Director	Ripon Khan	Payer Chhaap
Best Dance Director	None	None
Best Male Playback Singer	Bappa Mazumder; Chandan Sinha	Operation Sundarbans; Hridita
Best Female Playback Singer	Atiya Anisha	Payer Chhaap
Best Lyrics	Robiul Islam Jibon	Poran
Best Music Composer	Shouquat Ali Imon	Payer Chhaap
Best Story	Faridur Reza Sagar; Khorshed Alam Khosru	Damal; Golui
Best Screenplay	Mohammad Abdul Qayyum	Kura Pokkhir Shunne Ura
Best Dialogue	S A Haque Olike	Golui
Best Editing	Sujon Mahmud	Shimu
Best Art Direction	Himadri Barua	Rohingya
Best Cinematography	Asaduzzaman Mojnu	Rohingya
Best Sound Recording	Ripon Nath	Hawa
Best Costume Design	Tansina Shawon	Shimu
Best Makeup	Khokon Mollah	Operation Sundarbans

=== Multiple wins ===
Awards	Film
4	Shimu
3	Kura Pokkhir Shunne Ura Operation Sundarbans Poran Payer Chhaap
2	Hawa Rohingya Golui
