= Sujan Mahmud =

Bangladeshi film editor and sound designer

- Born: 24 September 1975; Dhaka, Bangladesh

Sujan Mahmud is a film editor and sound designer in Bangladesh. He is a two time National Film Award (Bangladesh) winner.

== Early life and career ==
At the age of 25, Sujan Mahmud made his mark to the film industry by editing Kittonkhola (2002). For his work in the film, he won best editor award at 25th Bangladesh National Film Awards. After that, he didn't look back. One after another he worked in Rupantor (2008), Britter Bairey (2009), Opekkha (2010), Meherjaan (2011), Bibek (2014), and Under Construction (2015). Besides these, he has edited internationally award-winning short film Statement After My Poet Husband's Death.

For his work in the film Britter Bairey (2009), he was awarded best sound recording award at 34th Bangladesh National Film Awards. Now he is working on some upcoming films.

== Filmography ==
Name	Year	Category	Work As	Note
Kittonkhola	2000	Feature	Editor	Best Editor at 25th Bangladesh National Film Awards
Rupantor	2008	Feature	Music and Soud Recordirst.	
Britter Bairey	2009	Feature	Sound	Best Sonud Recordist at 34th Bangladesh National Film Awards
Opekkha	2010	feature	Editor	
meherjaan	2011	Feature	Editor	
Bibek	2014	Feature	Editor	
Under Construction (film)	2015	Feature	Editor	
Statement After My Poet Husband's Death	2016	Short	Editor and Sound Design	
