= Hunting Flies =

Hunting Flies can refer to:

- Hunting Flies (1969 film), a 1969 Polish film
- Hunting Flies (2016 film), a 2016 Norwegian film
