= Made in Bangladesh (2019 film) =

2019 Bangladeshi film

- Film poster
- Bengali: শিমু / Shimu
- Directed by: Rubaiyat Hossain
- Written by: Rubaiyat Hossain; Philippe Barrière
- Produced by: François D'artemare; Ashique Mostafa; Peter Hyldahl; Pedro Borges; Aadnan Imtiaz Ahmed; Rubaiyat Hossain
- Starring: Rikita Nandini Shimu
- Cinematography: Sabine Lancelin
- Edited by: Raphaëlle Martin-Hölger; Sujan Mahmud
- Music by: Tin Soheili
- Production companies: Les Films de l'Après-Midi; Khona Talkies; Beofilm; Midas Films; Cinema Cocoon
- Distributed by: Pyramide Films (France)
- Release date: 6 September 2019 (TIFF)
- Countries: Bangladesh; France; Denmark; Portugal
- Language: Bengali
- Box office: $72,884

Made in Bangladesh (also known in Bengali as Shimu Bengali: শিমু;) is a 2019 Bangladeshi drama film directed by Rubaiyat Hossain. It premiered in the Contemporary World Cinema section at the 2019 Toronto International Film Festival, following the participation at BFI London Film Festival, Locarno Film Festival and other major festivals. Distributed by Pyramide Films, the film was widely released in France on 4 December 2019 and running for several months following the theatrical release worldwide including USA, Canada, Denmark, Portugal, Germany, China, Mexico, Singapore, Australia, Turkey, Bangladesh and Japan.

Made in Bangladesh (Shimu) received National Film Award in four categories including Best Director and Best Lead Actress

== Plot ==
Shimu, 23, works in a clothing factory in Dhaka, Bangladesh. Faced with difficult conditions at work, she decides to start a union with her co-workers. Despite threats from the management and disapproval of her husband, Shimu is determined to go on. Together the women must fight and find a way.

Made in Bangladesh / Shimu Bengali poster.

== Cast ==
Rikita Nandini Shimu: Lobby card of Bangladesh release.

- Rikita Nandini Shimu as Shimu
- Novera Rahman as Daliya
- Deepanwita Martin as Reshma
- Parvin Paru as Maya
- Mayabi Rahman as Tania
- Shatabdi Wadud as Reza
- Mostafa Monwar as Sohel
- Mita Rahman as Moyna's mother
- Shahana Goswami as Nasima

== Critical response ==
Had its world premiere at Toronto International Film Festival (TIFF), the artistic director of TIFF Cameron Bailey mentioned the main character of the film as "She is the Norma Rae we need now". Writing for Cinema Scope, Dana Reinoos described the film as "a vision of feminist solidarity in the face of overwhelming opposition" while Jordan Mintzer of The Hollywood Reporter called it "an earnest if sometimes schematic portrait of social rebellion' and wrote that it "definitely deserves wider attention."

The film won the Premio Interfedi Award at the Torino Film Festival, the Audience Award at the African Diaspora Film Festival, and the Norwegian Peace Film Award at the Tromsø International Film Festival.
