= Izer Aliu =

Izer Aliu may refer to:

- Izer Aliu (director) (born 1982), Norwegian filmmaker
- Izer Aliu (footballer) (born 1999), Swiss footballer
