= Shimu =

Shimu is a Bangladeshi surname.

- Raima Islam Shimu, Bangladeshi actress, film producer and director
- Reekita Nondine Shimu, Bangladeshi actress
- Sumaiya Shimu, Bangladeshi model, television actress and social activist

== See also ==
- Zeta Andromedae, a star also named Shimu
