= Opekkha =

2010 Bangladeshi drama film

- Film poster
- Bengali: অপেক্ষা
- Directed by: Abu Sayeed
- Written by: Abu Sayeed
- Starring: Mirana Zaman; Jayanta Chattopadhyay; Tinu Karim; Uzzal Mahmud
- Cinematography: Abu Sayeed
- Edited by: Sujan Mahmud
- Music by: Foad Nasser Babu
- Production company: Aangik Communications
- Release date: 31 December 2010
- Running time: 90 minutes
- Country: Bangladesh
- Language: Bengali

Opekkha (Bengali: অপেক্ষা, lit. 'Wait') is a 2010 Bangladeshi drama film written and directed by Abu Sayeed. The film stars Mirana Zaman, Jayanta Chattopadhyay, Tinu Karim, and Uzzal Mahmud.

== Plot ==
Rabiul and Ranju are two young men from two different districts of Bangladesh. Rabiul stays in Dhaka for his passion for singing. He was brought up by his grandmother, his only relative who lives in a village. Grandma writes letters regularly to him. Rabiul's grandmother has problems with her memory. Ranju studies at a college and he becomes a member of an Islamist militant group. He mounts a bomb attack in Dhaka which kills Rabiul and others. Ranju's parents come to know the fact and the revelation comes as a shock to them. Grandma forgets about the death of Rabiul and begins writing letters again and continues her eternal waiting at the village bus stop for her grandson to return. Parents also continue their eternal search for their son to come back.

== Production ==
The idea for Opekkha came to Abu Sayeed in 2006. He finished the script in 2009. Filming began in the Dhunat area of Bogra District in March 2010, and continued for 28 consecutive days.

== Release ==
Opekkha opened in Dhaka and Rajshahi on 31 December 2010.

== Award ==
- Best Director, Best Actor, Best Actress, Meril-Prothom Alo Critics Award, 2010.
