= Bangladesh National Film Award for Lifetime Achievement =

National Film Award for Lifetime Achievement
- Awarded for: Excellence in cinematic achievements for Bangladeshi cinema
- Sponsored by: Government of Bangladesh
- Location: Dhaka
- Country: Bangladesh
- Presented by: Ministry of Information
- First award: 2009 (34th)
- Final award: 2022 (47th)
- Currently held by: Rozina and Kamrul Alam Khan Khasru (2022 (43rd))

Highlights
- Total awarded: 23
- First recipient: Sultana Zaman (2009 (34th))
- Website: moi.gov.bd

The Bangladesh National Film Award for Lifetime Achievement (Bengali: বাংলাদেশ জাতীয় চলচ্চিত্র পুরস্কার আজীবন সম্মাননা) is one of the most prestigious film awards given in Bangladesh. Since 2009, awards have been given in the category.

== List of winners ==
| Year | Recipient(s) | Ref |
|---|---|---|
| 2009 (34th) | Sultana Zaman | |
| 2010 (35th) | Anwar Hossain | |
| 2011 (36th) | Razzak | |
| 2012 (37th) | Khalil Ullah Khan | |
| 2013 (38th) | Kabori Sarwar | |
| 2014 (39th) | Syed Hasan Imam and Rani Sarker | |
| 2015 (40th) | Ferdausi Rahman and Shabana | |
| 2016 (41st) | Bobita and Farooque | |
| 2017 (42nd) | ATM Shamsuzzaman and Sujata | |
| 2018 (43rd) | Alamgir and Prabir Mitra | |
| 2019 (44th) | Sohel Rana and Shuchanda | |
| 2020 (45th) | Anwara Begum and Raisul Islam Asad | |
| 2021 (46th) | Dolly Zahur and Ilias Kanchan | |
| 2022 (47th) | Rozina and Kamrul Alam Khan Khasru | |

== Sources ==
- BFDC (2012). "List of National Film Award recipients name 1975-2012" (PDF). Bangladesh Film Development Corporation (in Bengali). Dhaka: Ministry of Information (Bangladesh). pp. 1–23. Archived from the original (PDF) on 1 November 2020.
- BFDC (2013). "National Film Award 2013". Bangladesh Film Development Corporation (in Bengali). Dhaka: Ministry of Information (Bangladesh). Archived from the original on 18 September 2020.
- BFDC (2014). "National Film Award 2014". Bangladesh Film Development Corporation (in Bengali). Dhaka: Ministry of Information (Bangladesh). Archived from the original on 18 September 2020.
- BFDC (2015). "National Film Award 2015" (PDF). Bangladesh Film Development Corporation (in Bengali). Dhaka: Ministry of Information (Bangladesh).
- BFDC (2016). "National Film Award 2016" (PDF). Bangladesh Film Development Corporation (in Bengali). Dhaka: Ministry of Information (Bangladesh).
- BFDC (2018). "National Film Award 2017-2018" (PDF). Bangladesh Film Development Corporation (in Bengali). Dhaka: Ministry of Information (Bangladesh). Archived (PDF) from the original on 2020-11-01.
