= Chokkor 302 =

- Directed by: Saraf Ahmed Zibon
- Screenplay by: Syed Gousul Alam Shaon; Nahid Hasnat
- Story by: Saraf Ahmed Zibon
- Produced by: Abul Fazal Mohammad Ritu; Syed Gousul Alam Shaon; Sarder Saniat Hossain; Adnan Al Rajeev; Saraf Ahmed Zibon
- Starring: Mosharraf Karim; Tareen Jahan; Mousumi Nag; Intekhab Dinar; Rawnak Hasan; Sumon Anowar; Reekita Nondine Shimu
- Cinematography: Kamrul Hasan Khosru
- Edited by: Sanglap Bhowmik
- Music by: Emon Chowdhury, Jahid Nirob, Amit Chatterjee
- Production company: Gammaflix
- Distributed by: Tiger Media
- Release date: March 31, 2025
- Running time: 142 minutes
- Country: Bangladesh
- Language: Bangla
- Budget: approx. ৳3 crore

Chokkkor 302 is a 2025 Bangladeshi crime thriller film directed by Saraf Ahmed Zibon, in his directorial debut, coproduced by Abul Fazal Mohammad Ritu, Syed Gousul Alam Shaon, Sarder Saniat Hossain, Adnan Al Rajeev, Saraf Ahmed Zibon. The film's story revolves around Moinul (played by Mosharraf Karim), a police official who embarks on a journey to unravel mysteries through a series of intriguing events. The film released on Eid al-Fitr 2025.

== Cast ==
- Mosharraf Karim as Mainul, a Detective Branch official
- Shashwta Datta as Mainul's assistant
- Reekita Nondine Shimu as Mainul's wife
- Tareen Jahan
- Moushumi Nag
- Intekhab Dinar
- Rawnak Hasan
- Sumon Anwar
- Arian Sarwar
- Gaosul Alam Shaon
- Tanvin Sweety
- Jannatul Noor Moon

== Production ==
The film received a government grant of ৳6.5 million from the Bangladesh government for the fiscal year 2021-22. The film reportedly made with a budget ৳3 crore. The film was originally titled Bicharaloy, but following a directive from the ministry, the title was changed to Chokkor 302. The new title was officially announced on February 20, 2024, along with a poster showcasing a figure in a black shade, holding a pistol with a tense expression. Mosharraf Karim will reportedly play as the leading man in the film, while National Film Award-winning actress Reekita Nondine Shimu will portray his wife.

== Music ==
Chokkor 302

Soundtrack album by Emon Chowdhury
- Recorded: 2024
- Studio: Tiger Media
- Genre: Feature Film Soundtrack
- Language: Bengali
- Label: Tiger Media
- Producer: Emon Chowdhury

Emon Chowdhury chronology
Deyaler Desh (2024)	Chokkor 302 (2025)	TBA (TBA)

Singles from Chokkor 302
- 1. "Kaowa Komola Khaite Jane Na" Released: 18 March 2025

One of Matal Razzak Dewan popular song "Kaowa Komola Khaite Jane Na" has been re-created for the film and was released on March 18, 2025 as a single. While preserving Dewan's original lyrics, the song has been re-composed by Emon Chowdhury and sung by Kajal Dewan.

No.	Title	Lyrics	Music	Singer(s)	Length
1.	"Kaowa Komola Khaite Jane Na"	Matal Razzak Dewan	Emon Chowdhury	Kajal Dewan	3:13

== Marketing ==
The first look poster was revealed on March 30, 2024. The official 1-minute 16-second teaser of the film was released on March 15, 2025. A special screening of the film was held on June 29 at Centre Point Star Cineplex, Dhaka. On January 3, 2025, the film received a "U" certificate from the Bangladesh Film Certification Board.

== Release ==
The film is scheduled to release 1 April 2025, coinciding with Eid al-Fitr.

== Reception ==
=== Critical response ===
Nasif Tanjim of The Business Standard praised as a standout release, commended for its sharp dialogue, strong performances (particularly by Mosharraf Karim, Shashwat Dutta, and Sumon Anowar) and impressive technical aspects, including cinematography and color grading, despite minor flaws in its background score and subplot pacing.

Ahsan Kabir of Bangla Tribune rated the film 7 out of 10, praised for its story-driven plot, twist-filled narrative, and Mosharraf Karim's performance, while noting minor pacing issues.

Atanu Tias of The Daily Ittefaq praised Saraf Ahmed Zibon's Chokkor 302, highlighting Mosharraf Karim's performance, the suspenseful storytelling, and its technical aspects particularly, the cinematography and soundtrack while noting minor issues with pacing in the second half.
