= The Difficult Bride =

2026 psychological film by Rubaiyat Hossain

- International teaser poster
- Directed by: Rubaiyat Hossain
- Written by: Rubaiyat Hossain
- Produced by: François d'Artemare; Pedro Borges; Rubaiyat Hossain; Aadnan Imtiaz Ahmed; Ingrid Lill Høtgun; Anna Katchko
- Starring: Zaineen Chowdhury Karim; Azmeri Haque Badhon; Reekita Nondine Shimu; Sunerah Binte Kamal; Shatabdi Wadud; Saberi Alam; Mohammed Bari; Dameer Khan
- Cinematography: Leonor Teles
- Edited by: Raphaëlle Martin-Hölger
- Music by: Jim Williams
- Production companies: Les Films de l'Après-Midi; Midas Filmes; Khona Talkies; Barentsfilm; Tandem Productions
- Release date: 6 September 2026 (Venice)
- Running time: 88 minutes
- Countries: Bangladesh; France; Portugal; Norway; Germany
- Language: Bengali

The Difficult Bride is a 2026 psychological drama film written and directed by Rubaiyat Hossain. A co-production of Bangladesh, France, Portugal, Norway, and Germany, it follows Zaineen (Zaineen Chowdhury Karim), a bride-to-be in Dhaka whose wedding preparations draw her into a supernatural and psychological world shaped by beauty, faith, memory and fear.

The film had its world premiere in the Orizzonti section of the 83rd Venice International Film Festival on 6 September 2026, marking the first Bangladeshi feature film to be selected for the festival.

== Plot ==
Days away from her wedding, Zaineen, a bride-to-be, arrives at Mayfair, a historic beauty parlour in Dhaka, to prepare for her wedding. As her wedding preparations progress, she finds herself drawn into an unsettling and mysterious world shaped by beauty, faith, memory and fear. Her body begins to revolt against bridal rituals in poetic and grotesque ways. Reality gradually gives way to the supernatural as she encounters strange events and psychological disturbances.

== Cast ==
- Zaineen Chowdhury Karim as Zaineen
- Azmeri Haque Badhan
- Reekita Nondine Shimu
- Sunerah Binte Kamal
- Shatabdi Wadud
- Saberi Alam
- Mohammed Bari
- Dameer Khan

== Production ==
=== Development ===
The story of The Difficult Bride originated from an urban legend Hossain heard as a child at Mayfair Beauty Parlour, one of Dhaka's oldest salons. According to the legend, a bride died under mysterious circumstances at the salon. The idea stayed with Hossain for nearly two decades, evolving from a short film concept in 2006 into a feature screenplay through numerous rewrites. Hossain stated that the film came together only when the financing, collaborators and cast naturally aligned.

The film received post-production support from the inaugural Fondazione Prada Film Fund, the cultural institution of Italian fashion house Prada.

The film is produced by France's Les Films de l'Après-Midi, in co-production with Portugal's Midas Filmes, Bangladesh's Khona Talkies, Norway's Barentsfilm and Germany's Tandem Productions. The film also received backing from Eurimages, France's CNC, Portugal's ICA, Norway's Sørfond and Germany's World Cinema Fund.

=== Casting ===
Zaineen Chowdhury Karim, a newcomer, was cast in the lead role after initially being hired as an assistant director. She shares her first name with the character she plays. Karim had previously studied at Smith College in Massachusetts, where Hossain had also studied years earlier. A former professor introduced them, and Karim initially joined the project as an assistant director before being offered the lead role.

The cast also includes three Bangladesh National Film Award winners: Azmeri Haque Badhan, Reekita Nondine Shimu and Sunerah Binte Kamal.

=== Filming ===
Principal photography took place in Bangladesh, beginning on 8 June 2025 and concluding on 8 July 2025, with a total of 26 shooting days. Post-production was completed in Paris, France, and Lisbon, Portugal.

The film was shot by Portuguese cinematographer Leonor Teles. The score was composed by British composer Jim Williams, a recurrent collaborator of Julia Ducournau.

== Release ==
The Difficult Bride had its world premiere in the Orizzonti section of the 83rd Venice International Film Festival on 6 September 2026. It is the first Bangladeshi feature film to be selected for the Venice Film Festival. It will be followed by its North American premiere at the 2026 Toronto International Film Festival on 16 September. On 11 October 2026, it will compete at the 2026 BFI London Film Festival in official competition, and screened for the Asian Premiere on 30 October 2026 in the Competition section of the 39th Tokyo International Film Festival.

Films Boutique has acquired international sales rights for the film.

== Awards and nominations ==
The film received the Premio Bisato d'Oro (Independent Film Critics Award) at the 83rd Venice International Film Festival, where it had its world premiere in the Orizzonti competition section.

| Year | Award | Category | Recipient(s) | Result | Ref. |
|---|---|---|---|---|---|
| 2026 | Venice International Film Festival | Premio Bisato d'Oro (Independent Film Critics Award) | The Difficult Bride | Won | |

== See also ==
- List of Bangladeshi films of 2026
- Rubaiyat Hossain
- Cinema of Bangladesh
