= CPH PIX =

Annual film festival in Copenhagen, Denmark

Coordinates: 55°40′34″N 12°34′06″E

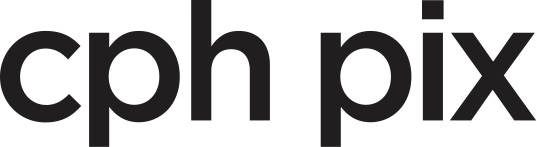
- Location: Copenhagen, Denmark
- Founded: 2009
- Disestablished: 2022
- Website: Archived version

CPH PIX was a film festival that took place annually in Copenhagen, Denmark. Created when the Copenhagen International Film Festival and the NatFilm Festival were merged in 2008, the festival ran from 2009 until 2021. It was run by Copenhagen Film Festivals, which also manages the documentary festival CPH:DOX. CPH PIX incorporated Buster Film Festival for Children and Youth between 2016 and 2018.

== History ==
CPH PIX was created when the Copenhagen International Film Festival and the NatFilm Festival were merged in 2008, which created the organisation Copenhagen Film Festivals. Copenhagen Film Festivals also manages the documentary festival CPH:DOX. The festival was founded by Jacob Neiiendam, former head of programming at Copenhagen International Film Festival from 2005 to 2007, and the Nordic correspondent for Screen from 1999 until 2005.

The first edition of CPH PIX was held in April 2009 with an audience of 36,500 - the largest crowd ever recorded for a film festival in Copenhagen at the time. The festival grew to an audience of 78,000 people in 2017.

In 2016 the festival merged with Buster Film Festival for Children and Youth, and the festival period also moved from April to October/November. From 2016, Jacob Neiiendam and CPH:DOX founder-director Tine Fischer were co-CEOs of all three festivals (CPH PIX, CPH:DOX, and BUSTER). In September 2018 it was announced that Jacob Neiiendam would be stepping down after 31 October, and that Fischer would continue as sole CEO for all three festivals.

Neiiendam had recently been appointed chairman of the Danish Film Academy earlier, and had been running the Robert Awards (the Danish film awards) since 2013. He had a continuing role on the selection committee for the European Film Academy.

Until 2018, the festival lasted for two weeks, with a packed program of more than 200 films from around the world, as well as 700 film related events and activities. After the change in management, the festival's format relaunched in a new compressed WEEKEND edition. The first WEEKEND edition was held in 2019, with a strongly curated program consisting of 20 films in four days. In this year, the festival once again separated from Buster Film Festival for Children and Youth.

In 2020, CPH PIX was cancelled due to the COVID-19 pandemic.

In February 2021 it was announced that Tine Fischer would be stepping down from the CEO role after the 18th edition (21 April to 2 May 2021) to take up a position as director of the National Film School of Denmark. The 2021 edition was a smaller version of the event, running over five days and screening 40 films, and this was the last edition of the festival.

In June 2022 it was announced that the festival would be shutting down permanently, after having had financial problems for some years in the new era of streaming services and being unable to raise the necessary funding. BUSTER and CPH:DOX festivals would continue, with the 2022 edition of BUSTER taking place from 29 September 29 to 9 October.

== Awards ==
Over the course of its history CPH PIX awarded several different prizes, including:

- New Talent Grand PIX, the main award given to a debuting director, selected by an international jury of industry professionals
- Politiken Talent Award, given to a debuting director of a Danish feature film in collaboration with Politiken
- PIX Audience Award, selected by audiences
- BUSTER's Best Children's Film, selected by a special children's jury, awarded as part of BUSTER

In 2021 the festival awarded only one prize: the Crystal Ball, an international competition for feature film debutants, which was selected by a jury consisting of industry professionals.

The award-winners were:

=== 2009 ===
Award	Director	Film
New Talent Grand PIX	Peter Strickland (RU/UK)	Katalin Varga
Politiken Audience Award	Philippe Falardeau (CA)	It's Not Me, I Swear! (C'est pas moi, je le jure!)

=== 2010 ===
Award	Director	Film
New Talent Grand PIX	Hélène Cattet and Bruno Forzani (BE)	Amer
Politiken Audience Award	Scandar Copti (PS), Yaron Shani (IL)	Ajami

=== 2011 ===
Award	Director	Film
New Talent Grand PIX	Alistair Banks Griffin (US)	Two Gates of Sleep
Politiken Audience Award	Saverio Costanzo (IT)	La solitudine dei numeri primi

=== 2012 ===
Award	Director	Film
New Talent Grand PIX	Kleber Mendonça Filho (BR)	Neighbouring Sounds
Politiken Audience Award	Philippe Falardeau (CA)	Monsieur Lazhar

=== 2013 ===
Award	Director	Film
New Talent Grand PIX	Ramon Zürcher (CH)	The Strange Little Cat
Politiken Audience Award	Felix van Groeningen (NL)	The Broken Circle Breakdown

=== 2014 ===
Award	Director	Film
New Talent Grand PIX	Eskil Vogt (N)	Blind
Politiken Audience Award	Benedikt Erlingsson (IS)	Of Horses and Men

=== 2015 ===
Award	Director	Film
New Talent Grand PIX	Thomas Daneskov (DK)	The Elite
Politiken Audience Award	Dagur Kári (IS)	Virgin Mountain

=== 2016 ===
Award	Director	Film
New Talent Grand PIX	Ralitza Petrova (BG)	Godless
Nordisk Film Fonden's Best Children’s Film	Alexandra-Therese Keining (SE)	Girls Lost
Politiken Audience Award	Guðmundur Arnar Guðmundsson (IS)	Heartstone
Politiken Fonden's Best Short Film For Children	Amalie Næsby (DK)	Ztripes

=== 2017 ===
Award	Director	Film
New Talent Grand PIX	Hlynur Pálmason (Iceland)	Winter Brothers
Politiken Audience Award	Philippe Van Leeuw (Belgium)	In Syria
BUSTER's Best Children's Film	Izer Aliu (Norway)	Hunting Flies

=== 2018 ===
Award	Director	Film
New Talent Grand PIX	Tuva Novotny (SE)	Blind Spot
Politiken Talent Award	Isabella Eklöf (SE)	Holiday
BUSTER's Best Children's Film	Anders Walter (DK)	I Kill Giants
PIX Audience Award	Boots Riley (US)	Sorry to Bother You

=== 2019 ===
Award	Director	Film
Politiken Talent Award	Frelle Petersen	Uncle

=== 2020 ===
Cancelled due to the COVID-19 pandemic

=== 2021 ===
Award	Director	Film
The Crystal Ball	David Adler	End Of Night

== Gallery ==
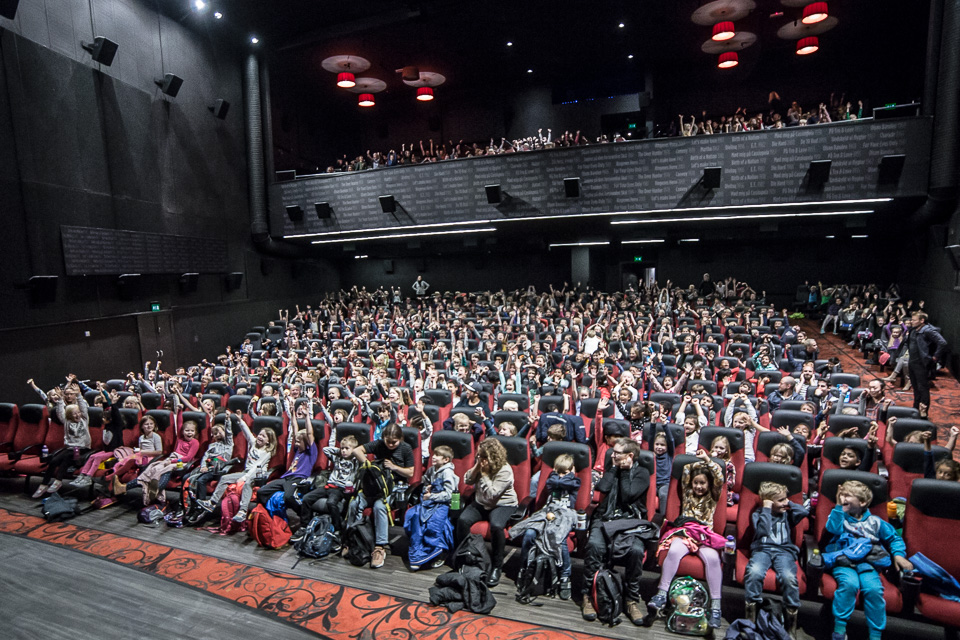
BUSTER film festival for children

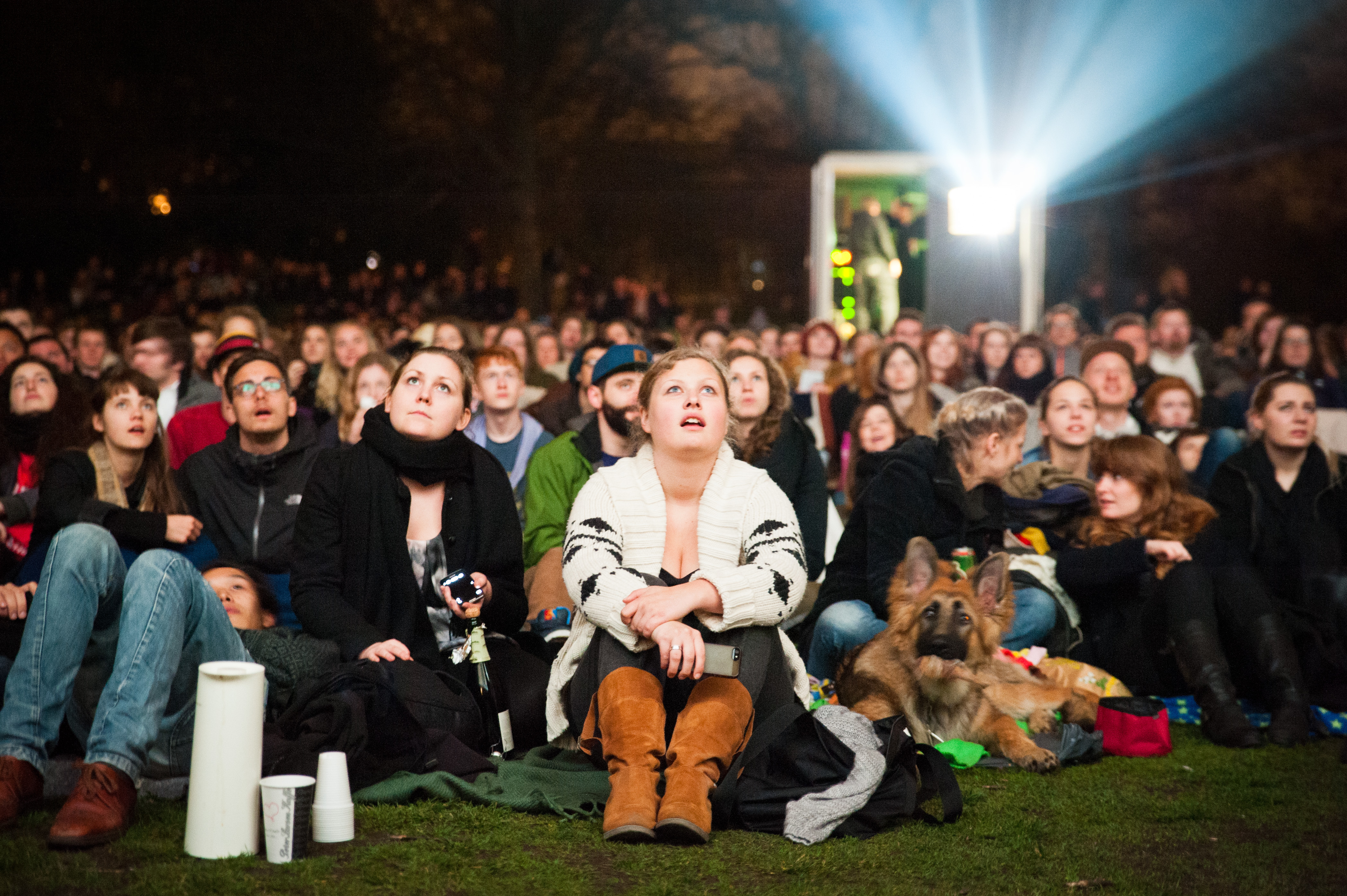
Open air screening of Game of Thrones season premiere 2014

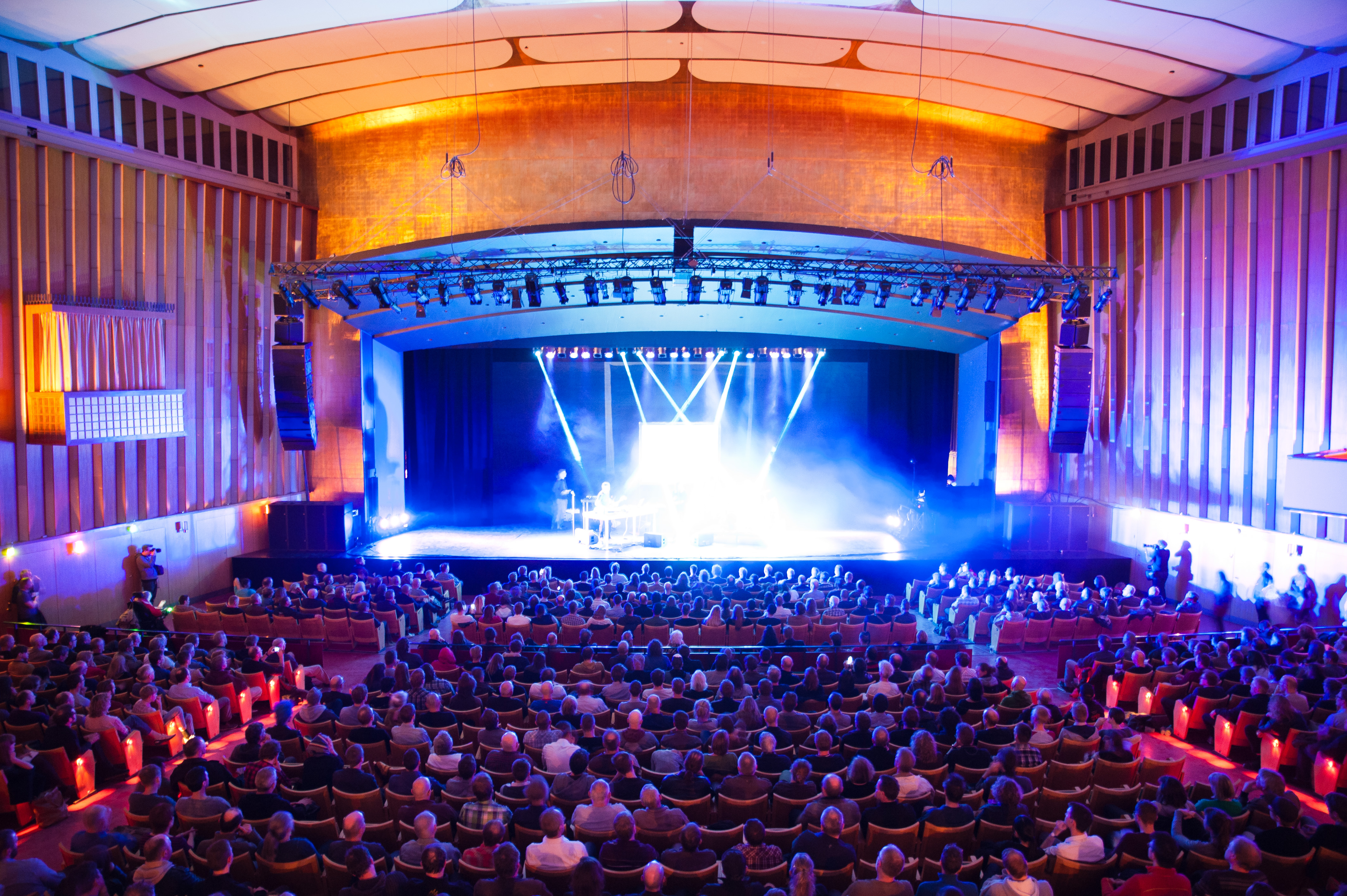
Concert during CPH PIX

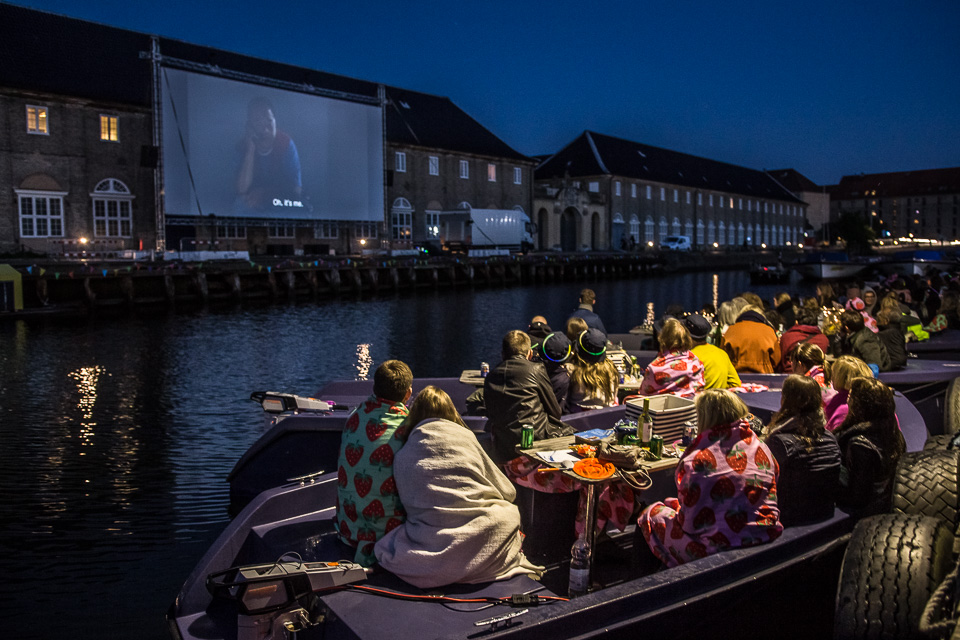
On location film screening in the channels of Copenhagen

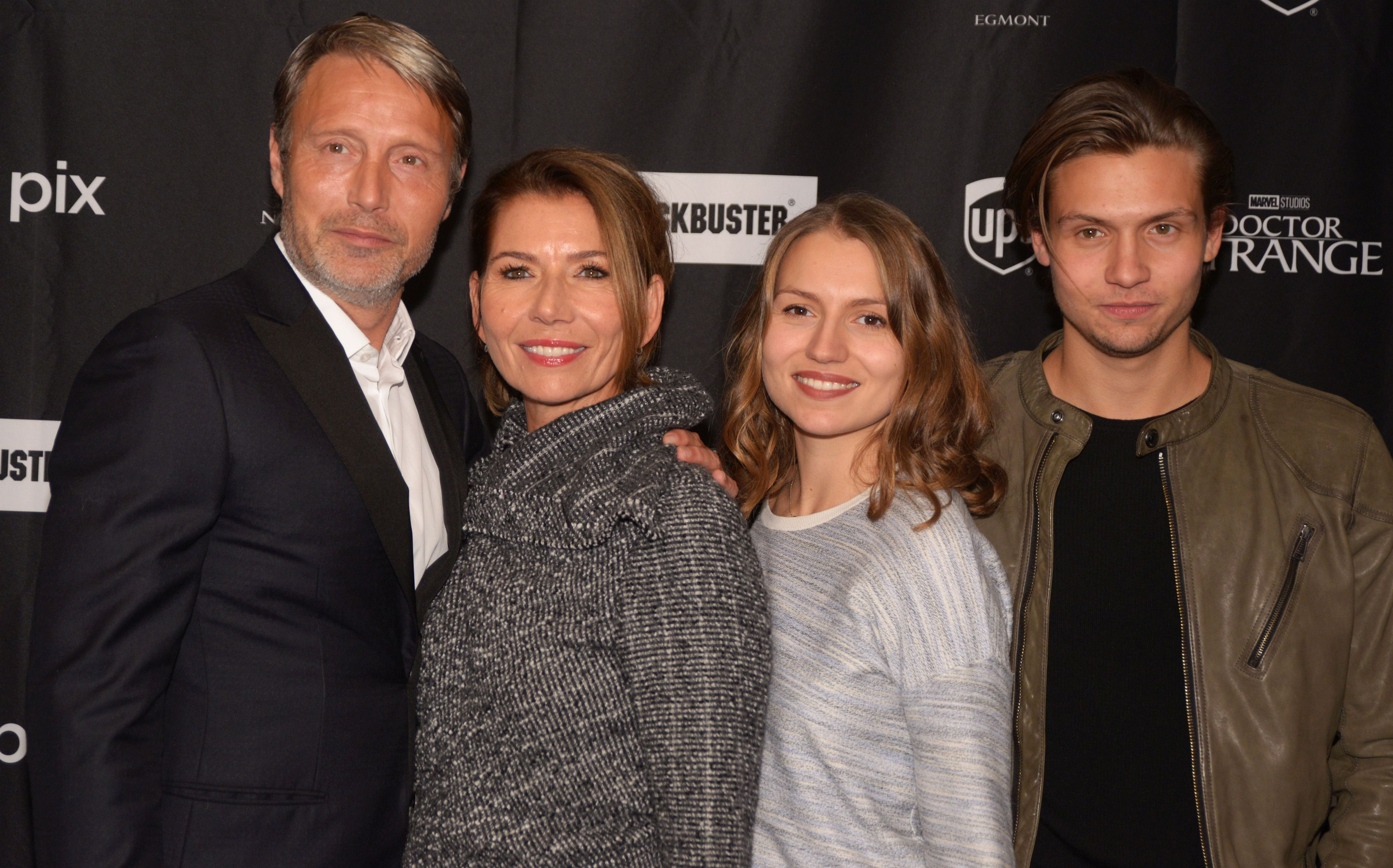
Mads Mikkelsen attending CPH PIX

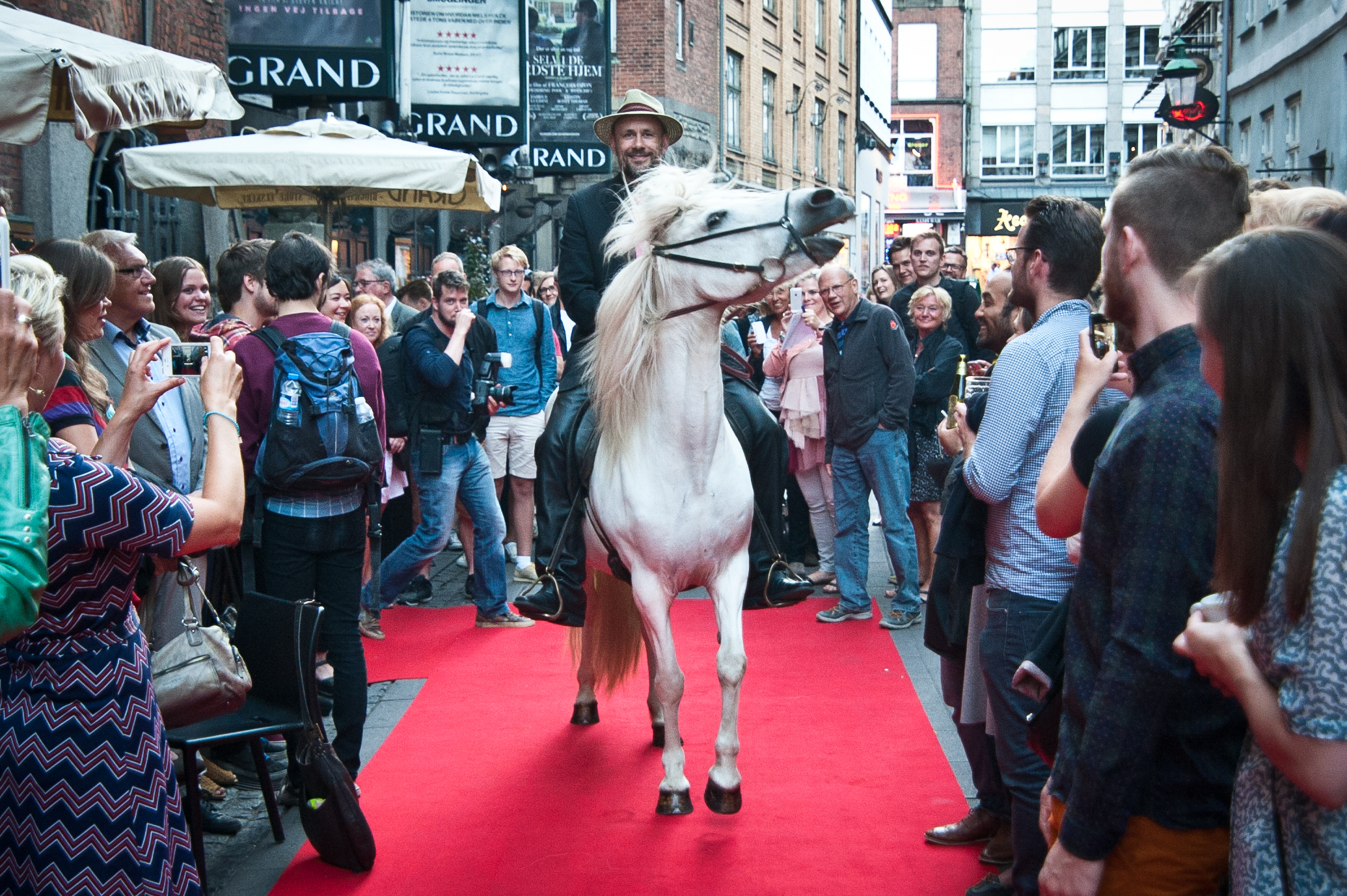
Premiere event of Of Horses and Men

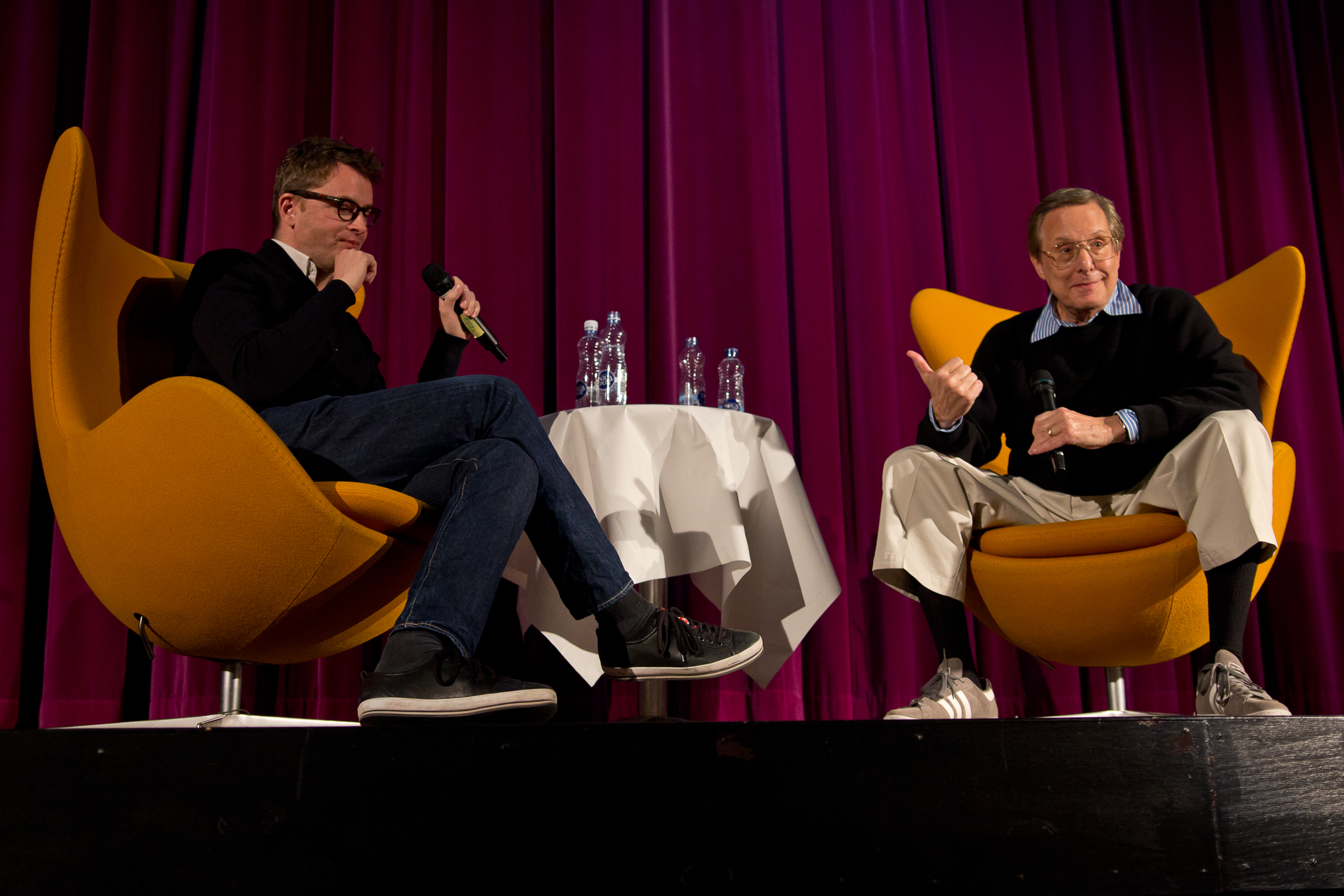
William Friedkin in conversation with Nicolas Winding Refn at CPH PIX

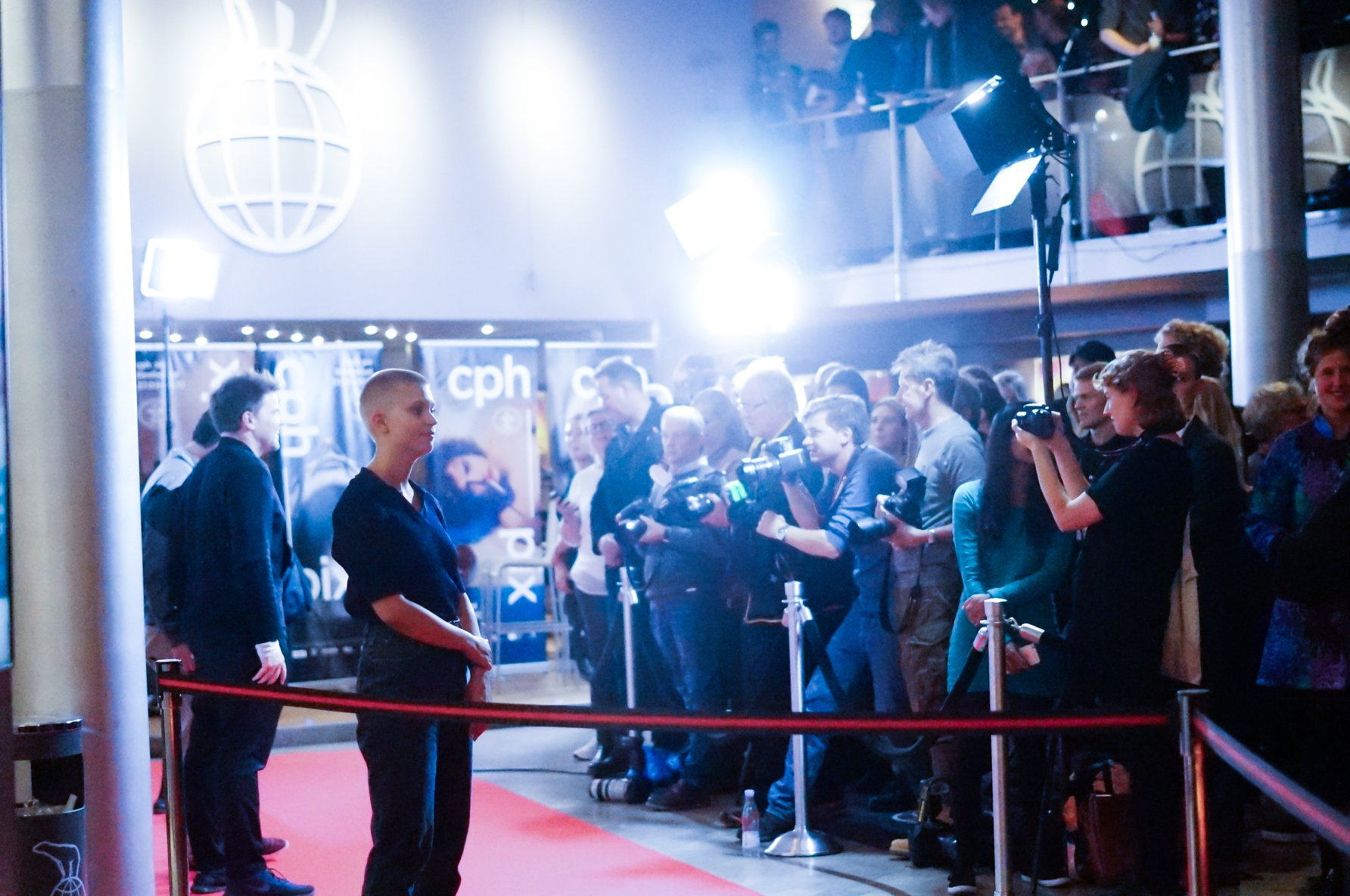
Red carpet for the opening gala 2018

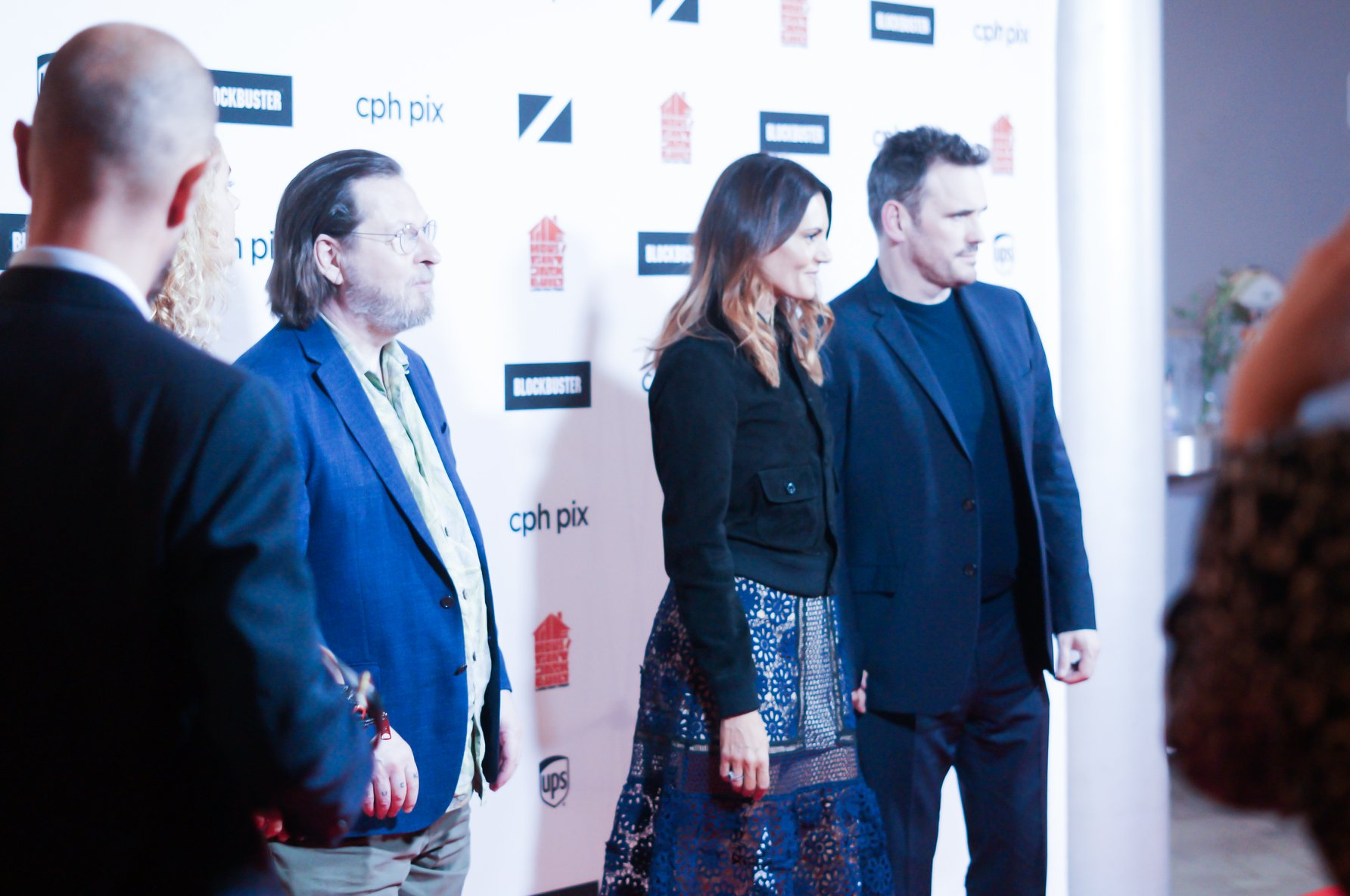
Lars Von Trier and Matt Dillon on the red carpet for the opening gala of the 10th edition of CPH PIX.
