= Ora Egaro Jon =

- Theatrical release poster
- Directed by: Chashi Nazrul Islam
- Written by: Al Masood
- Screenplay by: Kazi Aziz Ahmed
- Produced by: Masud Parvez
- Starring: Kamrul Alam Khasru; Abdur Razzak; Afroza Sultana Shabana; Farhana Amin Nuton; Sumita Devi; Rawshan Jamil; Khalil Ullah Khan; ATM Shamsuzzaman
- Cinematography: Abdus Samad
- Edited by: Bashir Hossain
- Music by: Khandaker Nurul Alam
- Production companies: Parvez Films; Star Film Corporation Ltd.
- Distributed by: Star Film Distributors
- Release date: 11 August 1972 (Dhaka)
- Running time: 117 minutes
- Country: Bangladesh
- Language: Bengali
- Budget: ৳500 k (US$68,493)
- Box office: ৳40 lakh (US$519,480)

Ora Egaro Jon (Bengali: ওরা ১১ জন; transl. They are eleven people) is a 1972 Bengali historical drama film written by Al Masood and directed by Chashi Nazrul Islam, based on the Bangladesh Liberation War. Director Islam and lead actor Kamrul Alam Khan Khasru were both members of Mukti Bahini (liberation army).

After Bangladesh won their independence, this was the first film about Bangladesh Liberation War.

== Plot ==
Khosru (Khosru) and his sister Mita (Shabana) live at their maternal uncle's home in Dhaka. Khosru's marriage with his neighbor Sheela (Nuton) is fixed. On the other hand, Sheela's engineer brother Parvez (Razzak) grew a romantic bond with Mita, a medical college student. Everything was going well until the war broke out.

Khosru joined the war and formed a guerilla force with ten other companions. The force was led by Khosru himself. Parvez was captured by the Pakistan army for helping the freedom fighters. In the midst of Parvez's torturous interrogation, Pak forces killed Parvez's mother and younger brother in front of him as the Pak major wanted to know about the whereabouts of the freedom fighters. His sister Sheela was also tortured and raped in the Pak cantonment.

Mita joined a medical team in Bikrampur to serve the wounded freedom fighters. However, one day, the Pakistani army also got hold of the medical centre she was working in. The Pak forces killed all the wounded freedom fighters in the medical centre and they also raped Mita in the process. She was later rescued by some freedom fighters; disgraced she later tried to commit suicide but was stopped by her senior doctor. The war later ended with the surrender of the enemy and the victory of the freedom fighters. Parvez returned wounded from Pak captivity and was treated in the medical centre where Mita was serving. Mita felt ashamed to show herself to Parvez but despite learning about Mita's persecution, he willingly reunited with Mita.

Back in the Pak cantonment Parvez's sister and Khosru's fiance, Sheela is freed along with other Birangonas. Khosru was able to find her but she succumbed to the immense persecution she suffered at the Pak army's hands and died at Khosru's arms.

== Cast ==
- Kamrul Alam Khan Khasru as Khosru, Guerrilla fighter's leader
- Murad as Murad, Guerrilla fighter
- Helal as Helal, Guerrilla fighter
- Abu as Abu, Guerrilla fighter
- Ata as Ata, Guerrilla fighter
- Monju as Monju, Guerrilla fighter
- Alin as Alin, Guerrilla fighter
- Altaf as Mijan, Guerrilla fighter
- Firoj as Firoj, Guerrilla fighter
- Siddique Jamal Nantu as Nantu, Guerrilla fighter
- Baby Zaman as Zaman, Guerrilla fighter
- Abdur Razzak as Parvez
- Shabana as Mita, Khosru's sister
- Nuton as Shila, Parvez's sister
- Mita Rahman as Keya
- Rawshan Jamil as Abu's mother
- Sumita Devi as Khosru's mother
- Sayed Hasan Imam as Doctor
- Kazi Mehfuzul Haque as Hafizur Rahman, Parvez's father
- Sabita as Paroma
- Sitara Begum as Aunt
- Mirana Zaman as Parvez's mother
- Sawpna Kazi as Baby
- Kazi Kamal as Khokon
- Hafizur Rahman Ayek as Khosru's uncle
- Suja Khondokar as Suja Afgan, Pakistani soldier
- Khalil Ullah Khan as Pakistani Major
- ATM Shamsuzzaman as Bejar Ali (Razakar)

== Production ==
=== Background ===
The film 'Ora Egaro Jon' was directed by Chashi Nazrul Islam and produced by freedom fighter and then Chhatra League leader Md. Masood Parvez, popularly known as Sohel Rana. He was a student of Dhaka University during Bangladesh Liberation War. After the war, Masud Parvez planned to make a film on the liberation war after returning to the university. The plan to make the film was taken on 19 December 1971. Famous freedom fighter Kamrul Alam Khan Khosru played the lead role in the film. He was the guerrilla commander of Dhaka region during the liberation war.

All those who acted in this film as freedom fighters were members of Mukti Bahini including Khusru with 10 other freedom fighters who had returned from the war, a few days before the shooting of the film.

=== Development ===
This was Chashi Nazrul Islam's first film as a director. Before that he was working as an assistant director. Mustafizul Hoque, one of the famous director at that time wanted to make the film at that time without remuneration. But after hearing that Chashi Nazrul Islam was also joining the project, Mustafiz said, “He has been working for a long time. He can do it". The producer of the film Masud Parvez was funded by many of his friends, relatives and well known personnel. His mother Delwara Begum gave a part of his pension money to his son. The producer also took ৳10,000 (US$1,369) given by his sister Ferdous Ara Begum. After the shooting of some scenes, a five-year contract of ৳450,000 (US$61,643) was signed with the Star Film Distributor. The signing money was ৳10,000 (US$1,369). It is said that the investment money of the movie came from the advance money from the owners before the release.

The weapons and ammunition used in the liberation war were also used in the shooting of the movie. Sohel Rana went to Air Vice Marshal AK Khandkar along with his close friend Noore Alam Siddiqui. After hearing that arms and ammunition would be needed to make the movie, he told the then Major Shaukat. A major was attached to the shooting team to look after the Pakistan Army and Bangladesh Army uniforms. With the help of Major Ziaur Rahman, one of the sector commanders of the liberation war, the battle scenes were shot with the weapons and logistics left behind by the Pakistan Army. Arms and ammunition were supplied from Gazipur Cantonment for use in the film. Basically this initiative was taken to make the battle scenes more realistic. Army personnel from Gazipur cantonment also acted in the film.

=== Filming ===
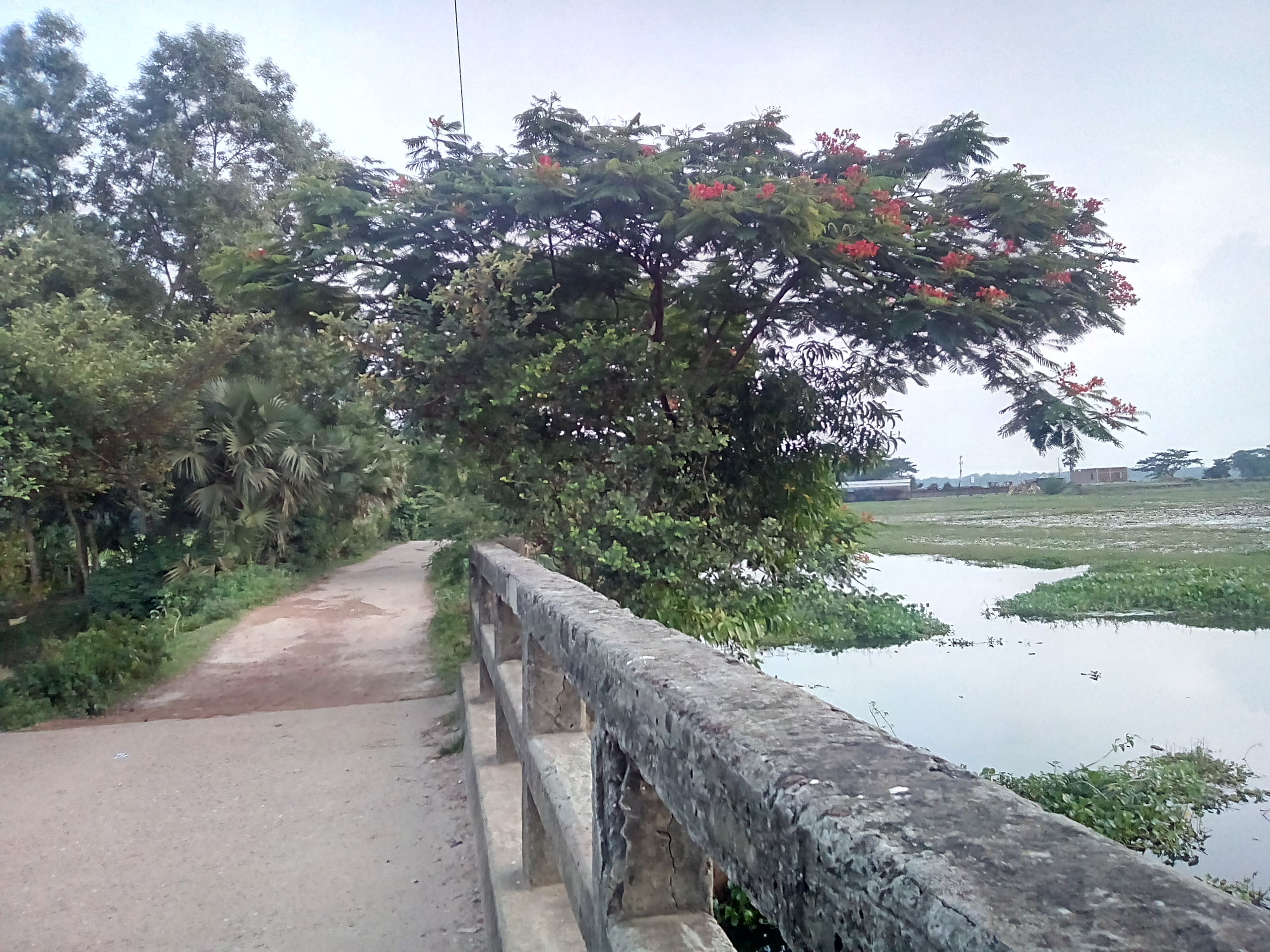
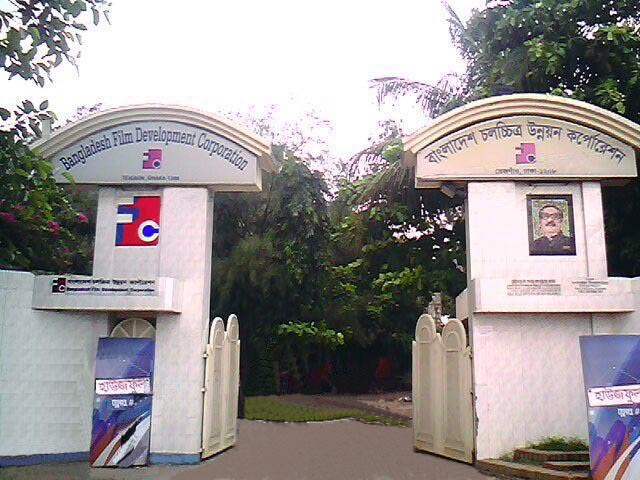
Joydebpur village and BFDC garden; much of Ora Egaro Jon was shot in these locations.

The use of real weapons also entails considerable risk in film shooting. Even cameraman Abdus Samad refused to capture some of the scene.

The film had a scene where Razakar was killed. For the sake of the scene, some Razakars detained in Iqbal Hall were caught and taken to the shooting. Sohel Rana said, the Razakars were asked to play death by shooting in water. Another scene also featured real Pakistani soldiers.

Another scene was to kill a captured Pakistani soldier. Two Pakistani soldiers, who were trapped during the liberation war were then imprisoned near the film's unit. They have not yet been handed over to the Bangladesh government. The scene is acted out with these two soldiers. They were then handed over to the cantonment authorities.

The film also featured some parts of the historic 7th March speech of Sheikh Mujibur Rahman.

The film was shot for 190 days starting from 3 February 1972, at various locations including Joydebpur, Gazipur Cantonment and Bangladesh Film Development Organization.

=== Casting ===
Although the movie was planned to be made only with freedom fighters, but Iftekharul Alam Kislu of the Star Film, suggested adding familiar faces alongside the freedom fighters. So the stars of that time were offered to act. To whom it was said, all agreed unanimously, even without remuneration. later stars like Abdur Razzak, Shabana were added to the cast for the film. Beside Kamrul Alam Khan Khasru, the other 10 freedom fighters who acted in the film are Manju, Aleen, Helal, Abu, Ata, Nantu, Baby, Murad, Altaf and Feroze. Apart from Razzak and Shabana, Actress Nuton, Rawshan Jamil, Mirana Zaman, Sumita Debi, Actor Mehfuz, Syed Hasan Imam, Khalil Ullah Khan, Raj and others starred this film. ATM Shamsuzzaman played the role of Razakar in the film.

== Music ==
Ora Egaro Jon

Soundtrack album by Khandaker Nurul Alam Sabina Yasmin, Saiful Islam and others
- Released: 1972
- Genre: Film music
- Language: Bengali

The music of the film is directed by renowned composer Khondaker Nurul Alam.

Ora Egaro Jon Soundtrack – Track listing
No.	Title	Lyrics	Singers	Length
1.	"O Amar Desher Mati"	Rabindranath Tagore	Saiful Islam
2.	"Amay Ekti Khudiram dao"
3.	"Ek Sagar Rokter Binimoye"		Sabina Yasmin

== Release ==
The film was released on 11 August 1972 in Dhaka.

== Reception ==
=== Critical response ===
Reviews were broadly positive nationwide. The film was discussed or reviewed by many critics and film makers and media. Notable among them is an edited book by Anupam Hayat, an article written by Chinmoy Mutsuddi and a research paper by Dr. Kaveri Gayen.

Everyone mentioned this film as a documentary film of the liberation war in their writings. Also, the panelists have given importance to innovation, technical skills and positive representation of women in the editing of the movie.

Ahmad Zaman Chowdhury said,

Some of the camera work in this black-and-white film was extraordinary. Soldiers running in rows. Scenes of the brutal killing of blindfolded, naked women were artistic. The use of metaphors and montages have played a significant role in establishing the film as a war film. In some cases, the influence of Sergei Eisenstein's war movie 'Battleship Potemkin' is seen in the film's editing and cinematography.

Evaluating the film as an important film in the history of Cinema of Bangladesh, film analysts and producer Matin Rahman said,

The director of the movie, the producer, the cameraman and most of the artisans made the movie with the experience of the liberation war. They did not erase the horrors of the Liberation war, they were transformed into scenes planning.

The film was also praised by Bangabandhu Sheikh Mujibur Rahman who formed the non-cooperation movement against the ruling party of Pakistan in the pre-Bangladesh Liberation War in 1971. After the release of the film, producer Masud Parvez went to his Dhanmondi residence to know about his opinion on the film. Mujib hugged him and said,

Well done, go ahead.

In the discussion of film critic Chinmoy Mutsuddi, he said,

Those who played the role of 11 freedom fighters in this film are all freedom fighters but none of them are actors. So while the acting in other scenes is not that great, the battle scenes are realistic enough.

This was both a strengths and a weaknesses of this film The actors are all freedom fighters, so their actions and shots on the battlefield were largely believable and realistic. But the lack of emotion and expression relative to the weakness and necessity of their dialogue as actors is quite noticeable. The story also slows down a bit in the middle of this almost two-hour film. In some cases, the director added extra time, which otherwise would not have harmed the film. There was no climax throughout the whole film. The director must be said to have failed somewhat in creating the necessary excitement in directing the flow of events. But there was enough opportunity to create this tension or climax in the story.

However, even 50 years after its release, the film is considered as a masterpiece. It has been selected for preservation by the Bangladesh Film Archive.

=== Box office ===
The film was a commercial success. It is known that within a week of the release, the production cost of the film had recovered. It grossed ৳40 lakh (US$519,480) at the box office.

=== Accolades ===
Award	Result	Source
Bachsas Awards	Won	
