= Jonmo Amar Dhonno Holo Maago =

1970 Bengali nationalist song

"Jonmo Amar Dhonno Holo Mago"

Song by Firoza Begum and Sabina Yasmin

from the album Shob Ko’ta Janala Khule Deo Na
- Language: Bengali
- Released: 1970
- Recorded: 1970
- Studio: Karachi Transcription Service
- Venue: Karachi, Pakistan
- Genre: Patriotic
- Length: 6:12
- Label: His Master's Voice (1970); Soundtek (2016-present)
- Songwriter: Noyeem Gahar
- Composer: Azad Rahman
- Producer: Azad Rahman

Music video
- "জন্ম আমার ধন্য হলো" on YouTube

Music video
- "১৯৭০-এর সংস্করণ" on YouTube

"I Am Blessed to Be Born" is a Bengali patriotic song composed in 1970 by Azad Rahman with lyrics by Noyeem Gahar. This song is in the genre “Jagorner Gaan” (lit.“Songs of Awekaning”) which was prevalent during the Bangladesh Liberation war. This song personifies Bengal as a Mother; And shows themes of nationalism and patriotism. After Bangladesh’s independence this song gains popularity with the singing of Sabina Yasmin.

== History ==
In 1970 Sabina Yasmin went to Karachi for the recording of this song. During the recording of this song Azad Rahman introduces Sabina Yasmin to Noyeem Gahar. The song was first recorded in a duet. The main voice of the song was the famous Nazrul Giti singer Firoza Begum and Sabina Yasmin. The background voice was given by Zinat Rehana, Nasir Haider, Ahmedullah Siddiqi, Asad Ul Haque and Laila Mozammel. This song was recorded at Karachi Transcription Service. In the same year this song was released on records alongside another song titled “Purber Oi Akashe Shurjo Uthechhe Alok e Alokomoy” by His Master's Voice.

== In popular culture ==
This Song is one of the “Jagoroner gaans” Composed by Noyeem Gahar. To raise the Moral of the revolutionaries this was one of the songs played by Swadhin Bangla Betar Kendra during the time of the Bangladesh Liberation war. The first two stanzas were said to be liked by Sheikh Mujibur Rahman, whenever he met with Sabina Yasmin, he supposedly often requested her to sing the first two stanzas of this song. She including many other artists sung this song many times in various concerts. This was also played many times on Bangladesh's National Television.

=== Reproduction and use in films ===
- An album titled 'Songs of Awakening' was released on December 12, 2009 with 71 songs that played a role in various movements and struggles in Bangladesh and was produced by Step Media Limited under the plan of Jagoron Culture and Research Centre. This song was one of them.
- Sabina Yasmin recorded and reproduced her own patriotic songs on Swapad and released the song in an album titled 'Shakol Ko'ta Janalen Na' under Soundtek. On 3 May 2016 Soundtek uploaded this album on their YouTube channel. later on 19 December 2019 the song was uploaded by it self.
- On 1994 this song was used in the film “Desh Premik” by Kazi Hayat.
