= Reekita Nondine Shimu =

Bangladeshi actress

- রিকিতা নন্দিনী শিমু
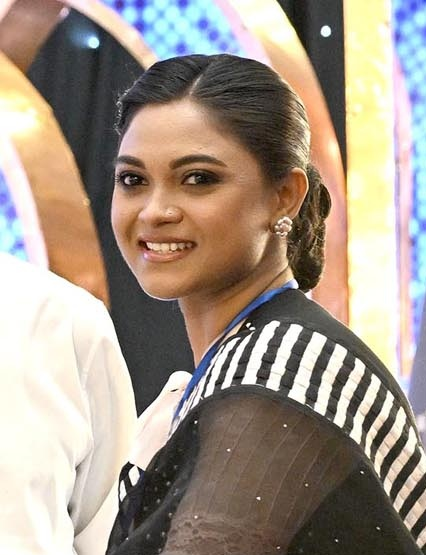
- Shimu receiving National Film Award (2023)
- Occupation: Actress
- Website: www.reekitanondine.com

Reekita Nondine Shimu (Rikita Nandini Shimu) is a national award-winning Bangladeshi actress, who acted in films of notable filmmakers including Tareque Masud, Rubaiyat Hossain and Aditya Vikram Sengupta. She received Bangladesh National Film Award for Best Actress and the Best Actress Award at Saint-Jean-de-Luz International Film Festival for her lead role in 2019 film Made in Bangladesh (Bangladeshi Title: Shimu).

== Films ==
Year	Film	Role	Notes	Ref.
2010	Runway	Sheuli	Debut film	
2016	Kingdom of Clay Subjects			
2016	Under Construction	Moyna		
2019	Made in Bangladesh	Shimu Akhtar		
2021	Once Upon a Time in Calcutta	Pinky	Indian Bengali film	
2025	Chokkor 302	Mainul's wife		
2025	Fereshteh		Iran-Bangladesh joint production film	
2026	The Difficult Bride			
