= Izer Aliu (director) =

Norwegian filmmaker (born 1982)

- Born: 1982 (age 43–44); Macedonia
- Occupations: Director; Screenwriter
- Years active: 2012-present

Izer Aliu (born 1982) is a Norwegian-Macedonian director and screenwriter. He is most well known for his 2016 debut feature film, Hunting Flies. He wrote and directed TV series Countrymen (Jordbrukerne) and a second feature film, 12 Dares (12 bragder), while a third feature film is under way as of May 2024.

== Early life and education ==
Izer Aliu, who is of Albanian descent, was born in Macedonia in 1982. He moved to Sweden when he was two years old, and grew up mostly in Norway and Sweden, later becoming a Norwegian citizen.

He first studied international relations and philosophy, before studying filmmaking at the Norwegian Film School at Lillehammer. There he taught young people in filmmaking workshops, as part of Filmbussen ("the cinema bus"), which travelled to schools in the vicinity. He graduated in 2012. He has spoken of the gratitude he feels towards his teachers, "who made me realize things I cannot imagine living without today", and his filmmaking education.

As of 2023 Aliu was a PhD student at the Film School, researching "if all editing is a lie". He intends to explore the process of editing through the life of making a film, from writing, through production, to post-production, and investigate whether there is a way "to 'cut' without 'cutting'".

== Career ==
Iliu's first short film, made as a student for exam purposes, was To Guard A Mountain (Å vokte fjellet; 2012), which received the Amanda Award for best short film at the Norwegian International Film Festival, among others.

His next short film was The Good Life, Over There (Det gode livet, der borte), which was nominated for the Amanda.

His breakthrough came with his debut feature film, Hunting Flies, a political film which explores "the birth, the flourishing and the fall of a dictator, within a school setting". There was only one professional actor in the film.

In 2018 Aliu made a short film, Crazy Love (L'Amour Fou), produced by frequent collaborator Khalid Maimouni. In this film, a man pretends to be mad in order to scare his neighbours in his small village, and then moves to the city to do the same thing.

He co-wrote the Rubicon TV Franco-Norwegian comedy TV series Countrymen (Jordbrukerne; 2021) with experienced writer-creator Anne Bjørnstad (Lilyhammer, Beforeigners). The series, which was filmed in the middle of the COVID-19 pandemic, centres on four immigrant men who move from Oslo to a little village in Telemark, south-eastern Norway. Khabib, the leader of the group, has big plans that rarely go the way he intended. Bjørnstad learnt Muslim prayers and learnt about the religion from an imam during the shooting. After being screened at Canneseries, Countrymen was broadcast on NRK in October 2021.

In 2022, his second feature film, 12 Dares (12 bragder), which he wrote and directed, premiered at the 2022 Gothenburg Film Festival on 2 February 2022. After being screened at several other festivals, it was released in Sweden on 15 December 2023 by SVT. The film, a comedy drama, is a Swedish-Norwegian co-production, produced by Lizette Jonjic of Zentropa Sweden, Maria Ekerhovd of Mer Film, and Khalid Maimouni of Storyline. Its title derives from the plotline: a 16-year-old boy in Sweden has to do 12 dares to prove his loyalty to his friends.

As of May 2024 Aliu's third feature film, 4 Guys and a Bag, is in post-production.

He says that what challenges him most in filmmaking is balancing his "need to be impulsive and improvise based on the surroundings" with the lengthy and meticulous planning needed to make a film. About his filmmaking:

Regarding my international ambitions: I have great ambitions, mostly because film is a universal language, with regional limitations. I think that as long as you are locally based, but express yourself globally, it makes it easy for everyone to gain insight in what being a human really entails. Although we are bound by limitations, our films are not.

== Awards and nominations ==
- 2012: Student Academy Award
- 2012: Amanda Award for Best Short Film, for To Guard A Mountain (Å vokte fjellet)
- 2014: Nomination, Amanda Award for Best Short Film, for The Good Life, Over There (Det gode livet, der borte)
- 2014: Best Film Award at the Grimstad Festival in Grimstad, Norway, for The Good Life, Over There (Det gode livet, der borte)
- 2015: Anders Jahre Culture Prize for young artists
- 2017: Many awards and nominations for Hunting Flies, including:
  - Winner, Norwegian Peace Film Award
  - Winner, Amanda Award for Best Direction
  - Winner, BUSTER Award for Best Children's Film
  - Nominated, Nordic Council Film Prize
- 2021: Special Interpretation Prize (for the whole cast) and the High School Prize for Best Series (voted by students from local lycées) at Canneseries, for Countrymen
- 2021: Countrymen is selected as one of the best international series released that year
- 2022: Rockie Award for Best Comedy Series: Non-English Language, at the Banff World Media Festival, Banff, Canada, for Countrymen
- 2022: Nominated (one of five) for the Nordisk Film & TV Fond Prize for outstanding screenwriting of a Nordic drama series

== Personal life ==
Aliu has two children.

He is an avid gamer, and proud of his achievements in Hearthstone and World of Warcraft TBC expansion.
