= Under Construction (film) =

Bangladeshi film

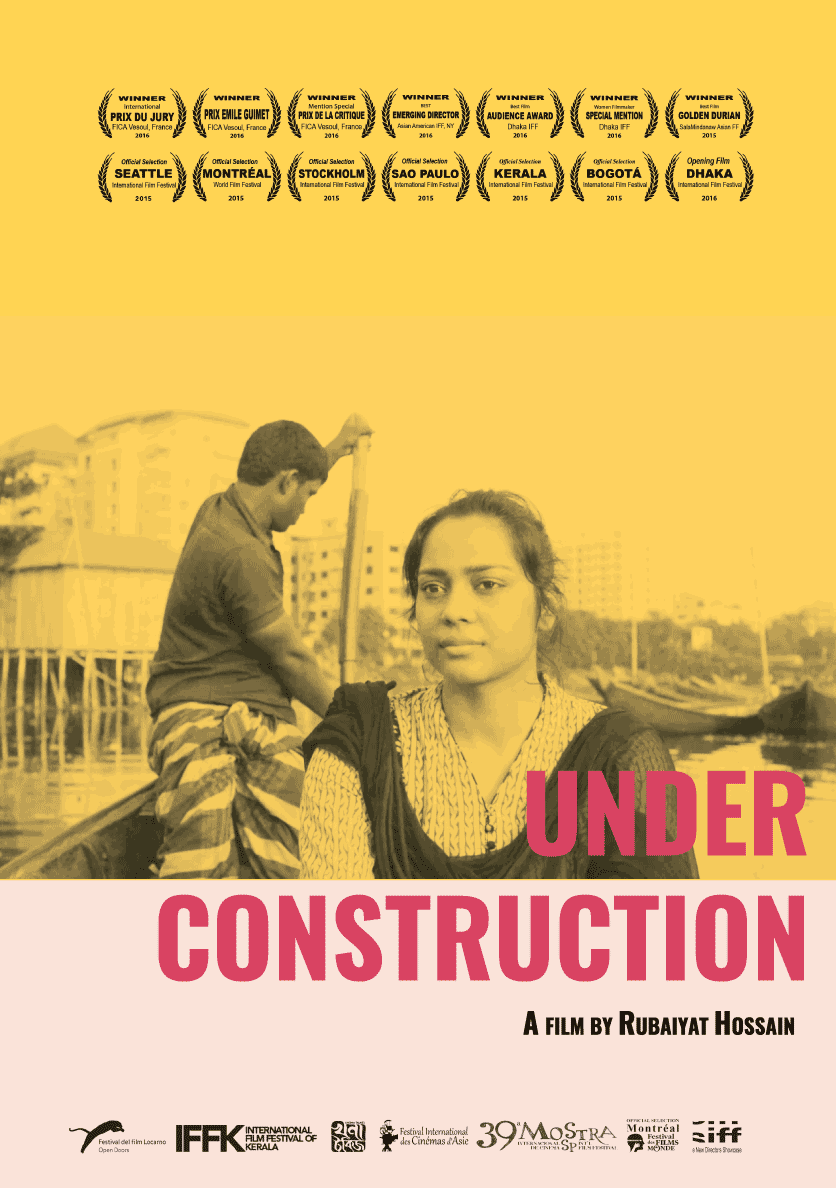
- Poster of film
- Directed by: Rubaiyat Hossain
- Written by: Rubaiyat Hossain
- Produced by: Rubaiyat Hossain; Ashique Mostafa
- Starring: Shahana Goswami; Rahul Bose; Rikita Nandini Shimu; Mita Rahman
- Cinematography: Martina Radwan
- Distributed by: Khona Talkies (Bangladesh); contre-courant (France)
- Release dates: 6 June 2015 (United States); 14 January 2016 (Bangladesh)
- Running time: 88 minutes
- Country: Bangladesh
- Language: Bengali

Under Construction (Bengali: আন্ডার কন্সট্রাকশন; and French title as Les Lauriers-roses rouges) is a 2015 Bengali narrative feature film written and directed by Rubaiyat Hossain.

== Plot ==
Struggling to find herself in the sprawl of urban Bangladesh, Muslim theater actress Roya suffers from her husband's wish for children and traditional life. Not interested in motherhood, she decides to reconstruct a famous and politically minded play for modern times, reclaiming her identity, her freedom and her sexuality in the process.

== Cast ==
- Shahana Goswami
- Rikita Nandini Shimu
- Mita Rahman
- Rahul Bose
- Shahadat Hossain
- Shohel Mondol

== Production ==
This film is produced by a Bangladeshi Film Production Company Khona Talkies.

== Release ==
Under Construction had its premiere at the Seattle International Film Festival on 6 June 2015.

It premiered in Bangladesh on 14 January 2016 at the Dhaka International Film Festival, where it was selected as the opening film and won the Best Audience Award. It opened in cinemas in Bangladesh on 22 January and ran for 4 weeks.

Released in France on 7 June 2017 running for 6 weeks.

=== Festivals ===
- Montreal World Film Festival
- São Paulo International Film Festival
- Stockholm Film Festival
- Locarno Film Festival - Open Doors
- It was screened at 51st International Film Festival of India in January 2021 in Country in focus section.

== Awards ==
- Prix du Jury International, FICA Vesoul
- Mentions spéciales de la critique, FICA Vesoul
- Prix Emile Guimet, FICA Vesoul (awarded by Guimet Museum in Paris)
- Best Emerging Director Award, NY AAIFF
- Best Audience Award, Dhaka IFF
- Bangladesh National Film Awards 2016
  - Best Dialogue
  - Best Make-up
