= Hunting Flies (2016 film) =

2016 film

- Film poster
- Directed by: Izer Aliu
- Written by: Izer Aliu
- Produced by: Khalid Maimouni
- Starring: Burhan Amiti
- Cinematography: Nils Eilif Bremdal
- Edited by: Izer Aliu
- Music by: Roy Westad
- Distributed by: Europafilm
- Release date: 10 September 2016 (TIFF)
- Running time: 106 minutes
- Country: Norway
- Language: Albanian
- Box office: $134,067

Hunting Flies (Fluefangeren) is a 2016 Norwegian drama film directed and written by Izer Aliu.

== Synopsis ==
Hunting Flies is a drama film set in a classroom over the course of one day. The protagonist, Ghani, is an idealistic teacher who loses his job on the first day of teaching. In a bid to get his job back he locks his students in the classroom and forces them to resolve a long-running conflict between their villages.

== Cast ==
- Burhan Amiti as Ghani the Teacher (the only professional actor)
- Miraxh Ameti
- Hadis Aliov
- Besar Amiti

== Production ==
Hunting Flies is the directorial debut feature film of Izer Aliu, who also wrote the screenplay. It was produced by Khalid Maimouni, who was born in Tangier, Morocco, in 1979, moving to Norway when he was 11. He has been involved in filmmaking since 2007.

After the project had started in April of 2013, filming was done over 22 days of the hot summer, in a rural area near Skopje in Macedonia. Nils Eilif Bremdal was director of photography and part of a team of only five people. Writer/director Aliu worked from an 11-page synopsis, developing the script as they worked.

There was only one professional actor in the film, Burhan Amiti; the rest were friends and relatives, including the filmmaker's wife, as it was difficult to find women prepared to act in the film.

== Themes ==
Writer/director Aliu says that Hunting Flies is "above all, a political film" in which he aimed "to evoke the birth, the flourishing, and the fall of a dictator, within a school setting". He said it was about the loss of principles, and the challenge of remaining true to ourselves "when the system forces us to change".

== Release ==
Hunting Flies had its world premiere in the Discovery section at the 2016 Toronto International Film Festival, and went on to screen at many other film festivals.

== Accolades ==
The film earned many nominations and some wins in several awards in 2017, including:

- Winner, Norwegian Peace Film Award
- Winner, Amanda Award for Best Direction
- Winner, BUSTER Award for Best Children's Film
- Nominated, Nordic Council Film Prize
- Nominated, Amanda Award for Best Screenplay
- Nominated, Amanda Award for Best Cinematography
