= Meherjaan =

Bengali film

- Theatrical release poster
- Directed by: Rubaiyat Hossain
- Written by: Rubaiyat Hossain
- Screenplay by: Rubaiyat Hossain; Ebadur Rahman
- Produced by: Ashique Mostafa
- Starring: Jaya Bachchan; Victor Banerjee; Humayun Faridi
- Cinematography: Samiran Datta
- Edited by: Sujan Mahmud; Mita Chakraborty
- Music by: Neil Mukherjee
- Distributed by: Habibur Rahman Khan
- Release date: January 21, 2011
- Running time: 119 minutes
- Country: Bangladesh
- Languages: Bengali; English; Urdu

Meherjaan (Bengali: মেহেরজান) is the feature-length début film of Bangladeshi director Rubaiyat Hossain. The film was pulled from theatres due to the hostile response of some segments of the audience after its release in January 2011. Meherjaan claims to be a women's "feminine" re-visiting of the Bangladesh Independence War with Pakistan in 1971, while many feel discomfort with the deconstructive representation of the '71 conflict.

== Cast ==
- Jaya Bachchan as Meher
- Victor Banerjee as Khwaja Saheb (Grandfather)
- Omar Rahim as Wasim Khan (Pakistani Soldier)
- Shaina Amin as Young Meher
- Reetu A Sattar as Neela (Birangona/Freedom fighter)
- Azad Abul Kalam as Shumon (Communist Party worker)
- Humayun Faridi as Khonker (Razakar)
- Sharmili Ahmed as Meher's Mother
- Khairul Alam Sabuj as Meher's Father
- Monira Mithu as Meher's Aunt
- Nasima Selim as Sarah (Warchild)
- Rubaiyat Hossain as Salma
- Ashique Mostafa as Shimul (Freedom fighter)
- Shatabdi Wadud as Khalil
- Iqbal Sultan as Major Baset (Pakistani Major)
- Rifat Chowdhury as Arup
- Arup Rahee as Rahee
- Rajeev Ahmed as Sami
- Tansina Shawan as Joba (Freedom Fighter)

== Festivals and awards ==
Meherjaan still on a book cover, published by University of Washington Press.

Meherjaan poster

Meherjaan has been participated in many film festivals including Kolkata Film Festival, Festival International de Films de Fribourg, Festival de Cine de Bogotá,Festival Cinematográfico Internacional del Uruguay, London Asian Film Festival, Osian's Cinefan Festival of Asian & Arab Cinema.

Meherjaan wins a handful of awards at International film festivals and competitions including Best Critic Award (Jaipur International Film Festival), Jury Award and Audience Award (Northampton International Film Festival), Orson Welles Award (Tiburon International Film Festival)

== Suspension ==
The film was withdrawn from movie theatres in Bangladesh due to the objections of different groups of people. "The film Meherjaan, which was released in Dhaka in January 2011, was quickly pulled out of theatres after it created a furore among audiences. The hostile responses to the film from across generations highlight the discomfort about the portrayal of a raped woman, and its depiction of female and multiple sexualities during the Bangladesh Liberation War of 1971. The film's stance against nationalism also created a stir among audiences."

On 3 November 2011, there was a special film event and a panel discussion at Harvard University sponsored by the University of Massachusetts Boston, South Asia Initiative at Harvard University, Consortium on Gender, Security and Human Rights at UMass, and the CARR Center for Human Rights, Harvard Kennedy School. The film was screened in advance of a panel discussion by Cambridge/Boston academics.

== Reception ==
=== Critical response ===
Meherjaan has received mixed reviews. Nayanika Mookherjee of Economic and Political Weekly noted that Meherjaan's withdrawal stemmed from its romantic plotline involving a West Pakistani soldier, which challenged traditional 1971 war narratives and provoked public discomfort over its depiction of wartime gender dynamics. In a coverage of the Kolkata Film Festival, The Times of India noted that despite facing controversy in Bangladesh, Rubaiyat Hossain's 1971-based romantic drama Meherjaan was well received by the audience in Kolkata. A critic of The Sunday Guardian characterized Meherjaan as a provocative film that explores a romance between a Bangladeshi woman and a Pakistani soldier during the 1971 war. The critique noted that the film's humanistic focus on love amidst military conflict challenged traditional wartime narratives, making it a highly controversial yet notable work in South Asian cinema. A critic of The Express Tribune highlighted that Meherjaan was voluntarily withdrawn from Bangladeshi theaters due to public backlash over its romantic depiction of a Pakistani soldier during the 1971 war. Critics and veterans argued that the film distorted war history, while the filmmakers defended it as an alternative narrative on love and conflict.

Ethirajan Anbarasan of BBC News noted that Meherjaan sparked intense controversy for depicting a romance between a Bengali woman and a Pakistani soldier during the 1971 war. Critics argued that the film distorted historical realities and softened wartime atrocities, leading to its withdrawal from cinemas. Writing for The Daily Star, researcher Naeem Mohaiemen described Meherjaan as a flawed effort at creating a counter-narrative of the 1971 war. While noting that fiction should not be burdened with serving strictly as historical reportage, he criticized the film's cinematic execution—arguing that its idealized romance and stylized aesthetic obscured the historical geography and brutal realities of the genocide. Subir Bhaumik of Al Jazeera, highlighted that Meherjaan sparked widespread outrage in Bangladesh for attempting to break away from traditional wartime narratives by portraying a romance between a Bengali woman and a Pakistani soldier. The report noted that critics and feminist activists accused the film of trivializing the atrocities committed by the Pakistani military during the 1971 war, which ultimately led to its withdrawal from theaters by the distributor. William Gomes of Bangla News 24 noted, the screening of Meherjaan was halted in Bangladeshi theaters following widespread objections from audiences and war veterans. The report highlighted that the film faced intense criticism for its controversial storyline involving a romance with a Pakistani soldier, which many argued demeaned the history and spirit of the 1971 Liberation War.
