= Norwegian Peace Film Award =

Annual award

The Norwegian Peace Film Award - NoPFA was founded December 2, 2003. The organizations represented at the inaugural meeting were the Centre for Peace Studies (CPS), the Students Network for Peace (SNF), and the Tromsø International Film Festival (TIFF).

== Objectives ==
The NoPFA-Foundation will annually give The Norwegian Peace Film Award during the Tromsø International Film Festival to a film spotlighting direct, structural or cultural violence, and which in a creative way contributes to a deeper understanding of conflicts and violence. Through educational work and distribution of the award, the foundation wants to contribute to the promotion of a culture of peace both on local and international level.

The foundation is a non-profit organization and has no political affiliation.

== Organization ==
The foundation is managed by a board consisting of six members. Each of the three founding organizations appoints two members. The board is responsible for the administration of the foundation, for its representation outwards, for the nomination of relevant films for the award, and for the appointment of the jury.

== Winners ==
- 2020 Made in Bangladesh, Rubaiyat Hossain, France/Bangladesh/Denmark/Portugal, Pyramide International
- 2019 Blindspotting, Carlos López Estrada, USA, Non Stop Entertainment
- 2018 A Man of Integrity, Mohammad Rasoulof, Iran, Arthaus
- 2017 Hunting Flies, Izer Aliu, Norway/Macedonia, Europafilm
- 2016 Democrates, Camilla Nielsson, Danmark, Det Danske Filminstitut
- 2015 Drone, Tonje Hessen Schei, Norway, Tour de Force
- 2014 Omar, Hany Abu-Assad, Palestine, The Match Factory
- 2013 Wadjda, Haifaa Al Mansour, Germany/Saudi Arabia, Arthaus
- 2012 Play, Ruben ôstlund, Sweden, Arthaus
- 2011: Hands Up (Romain Goupil, France)
- 2010: The Other Bank (George Owashvili, Georgia/Kazakhstan)
- 2009: Waltz with Bashir (Ari Folman, Israel)
- 2008: Little Moth (Peng Tao, China)
- 2007: The Cats of Mirikitani (Linda Hattendorf, USA)
- 2006: Shooting Dogs (Michael Caton-Jones, UK)
- 2005: Beautiful City (Asghar Farhadi, Iran)
- 2004: In This World (Michael Winterbottom, UK)
