= Subhasish Bhowmik =

Bangladeshi actor

- সুভাশীষ ভৌমিক
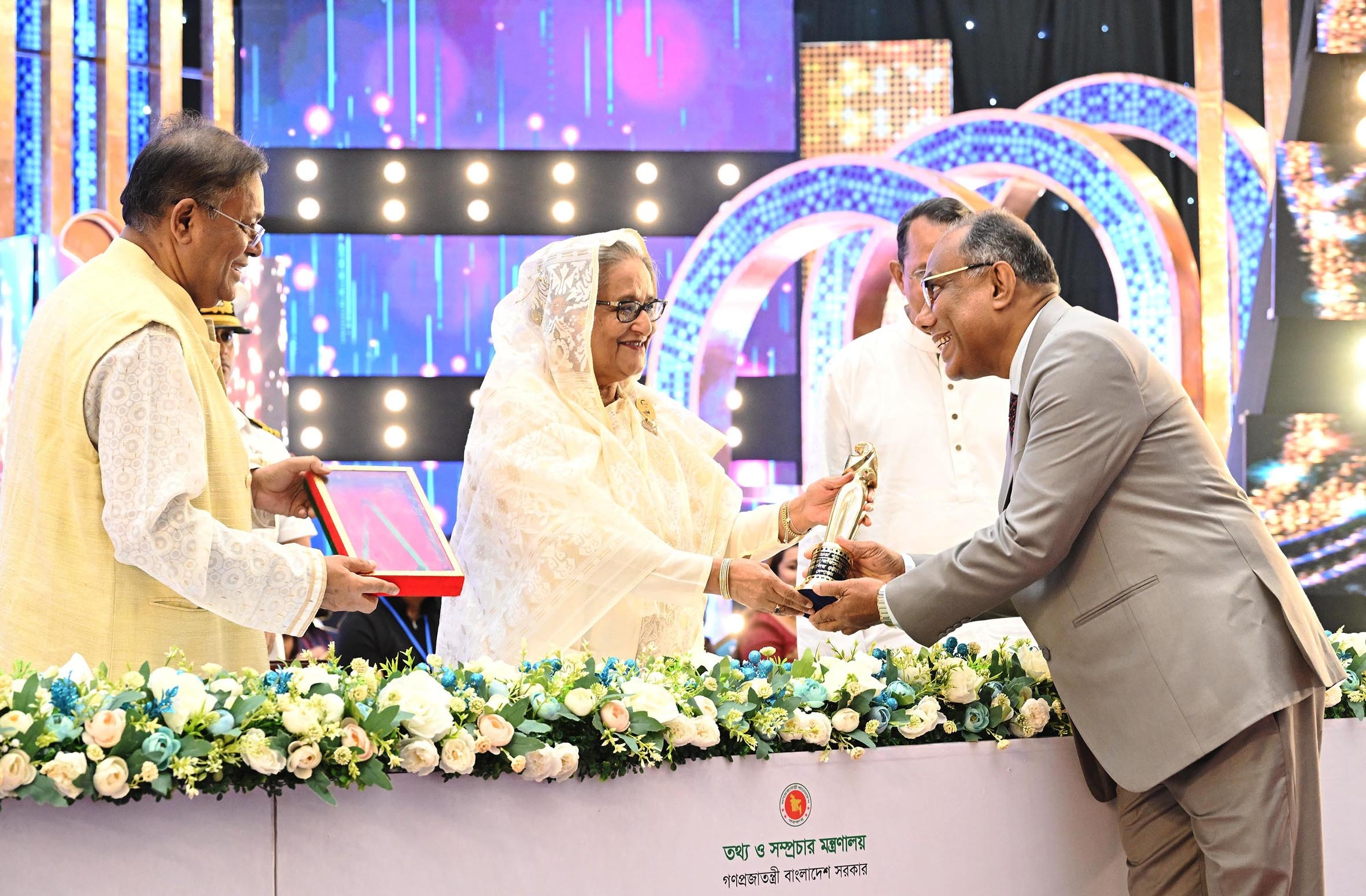
- Bhowmik (rightmost) receives National Film Award from Sheikh Hasina in 2023.
- Education: Jahangirnagar University
- Occupation: Actor
- Years active: 1985–present
- Spouse: Angona Bhowmik
- Children: Shuvojit Bhowmik; Sarbajit Bhowmik
- Parents: Subhash Chandra Bhowmik (father); Mridula Bhowmik (mother)

Subhasish Bhowmik is a Bangladeshi stage, television and film actor. He was born to Subhash Chandra Bhowmik and Mridula Bhowmik. He won Bangladesh National Film Award for Best Performance in a Negative Role for his role in the film Deshantor (2022).

== Career ==
Bhowmik made his television debut in 1985 with Bibaho, directed by Humayun Ahmed. He performed in notable films include Guerrilla (2011) and Bhuban Majhi (2017).
