= Ami Banglay Gaan Gai =

Patriotic song by Pratul Mukhopadhay

- Gana Sangeet by Pratul Mukhopadhyay
- English: I sing in Bengali
- Native name: আমি বাংলায় গান গাই
- Year: 1994
- Genre: Ganasangeet
- Language: Bengali
- Based on: The mother tongue of Bengali
- Duration: 6:33
- Vocal: Pratul Mukhopadhyay

Ami Banglay Gaan Gai (Bengali: আমি বাংলায় গান গাই) is a patriotic song by Bengali poet and composer and singer Pratul Mukhopadhyay. The song was elected as sixth greatest Bengali song of all time by BBC Bangla. This song also has been sung in a popular action Bharatio Bangla Cinema 'Kranti' acting by popular actor Jeet.

== History ==
This song of Pratul Mukhopadhyay was later sung by the popular artist of Bangladesh Mahmuduzzaman Babu and after him Anupam Roy, Durnibar Saha, Iman Chakraborty, Sagarika Bhattacharya and many others have released albums singing this popular song.

== See also ==
- "Amar Sonar Bangla"
