= Khasru (actor) =

Bangladeshi film actor

Quamrul Alam Khan (known as Khasru) is a Bangladeshi film actor and veteran of the Bangladesh Liberation War who received the Bangladesh National Film Award for Lifetime Achievement in 2022. After the independence, he starred as a Freedom Fighter in the first Bangladeshi film on the Bangladesh Liberation War, directed by Chashi Nazrul Islam titled Ora Egaro Jon. Prime Minister Sheikh Hasina, on 14 November 2023, presented the award to him for his invaluable contributions to the industry jointly with Rozina. He was a guerrilla commander of the Dhaka region during the Liberation War in 1971.

== Bangladesh Liberation War ==
In June 1970, student leaders of the Shadhin Bangla Nucleus decided to design a flag to represent a future independent Bangladesh. The design featured a red sun on a dark green background, with a golden map of Bangladesh placed at the centre to counter propaganda and affirm a distinct national identity. Khasru played a practical role in the making of this early version of the flag. He was assigned to purchase the necessary fabric, selecting green and red cloth from a shop in New Market, Dhaka. He then arranged for the flag to be stitched at a tailoring shop in the city.

Following the outbreak of the Bangladesh Liberation War in 1971, Khasru received guerrilla warfare training in Dehradun, India. He was part of a group of eleven freedom fighters. After training, the group set up a camp near the Shitalakshya River on the outskirts of Dhaka. The area was strategically important because it was close to industrial zones and key river routes. He served as the commander of his group. The fighters blended into the local community and observed the movements of the Pakistani army. They established several camps in the region and stored arms and ammunition in an under-construction factory owned by Jahurul Islam.

One of his notable operations occurred in Ruposhi, near the Shitalakshya River. The Pakistani army had built bunkers near the road leading toward the Narsingdi and Sylhet highway and the road toward Cumilla and Chattogram. The river area was used by patrol boats. During the monsoon season, much of the land was flooded. Khasru and his team used this condition to their advantage. On 7 September 1971, Khasru left his camp at Shalipur by boat with a young steersman named Sunil. While passing under a bridge near the Narsingdi road, they noticed a jeep carrying armed Pakistani soldiers approaching the riverbank. To avoid detection, he entered the water and hid beneath the bridge while the boat continued forward. The soldiers searched the boat but did not find him. After they left, he returned to the boat and continued his journey. During his visit, news arrived that Pakistani forces were looting the local bazaar and detaining civilians. He decided to plan an ambush.

When the Pakistani patrol boats began to return, Khasru opened fire with his light machine gun. According to later accounts, two of the patrol boats sank, and a third moved away with casualties on board. The Pakistani forces later brought reinforcements and carried out retaliatory attacks in the area. Houses were burned, and civilians were killed. He had already warned many villagers to leave in anticipation of such action. He relocated their base to a nearby village.

Khasru later described the Ruposhi operation as one of the most significant missions of his wartime experience. He has stated that his actions during the war were motivated by his commitment to Bangladesh and to its founding leader Sheikh Mujibur Rahman. During the first week of December 1971, Khasru and his group assisted the allied Bangladeshi and Indian forces in crossing the river on their way toward Dhaka.
