= Rubaiyat Hossain =

Bangladeshi film director, writer, and producer

- রুবাইয়াত হোসেন
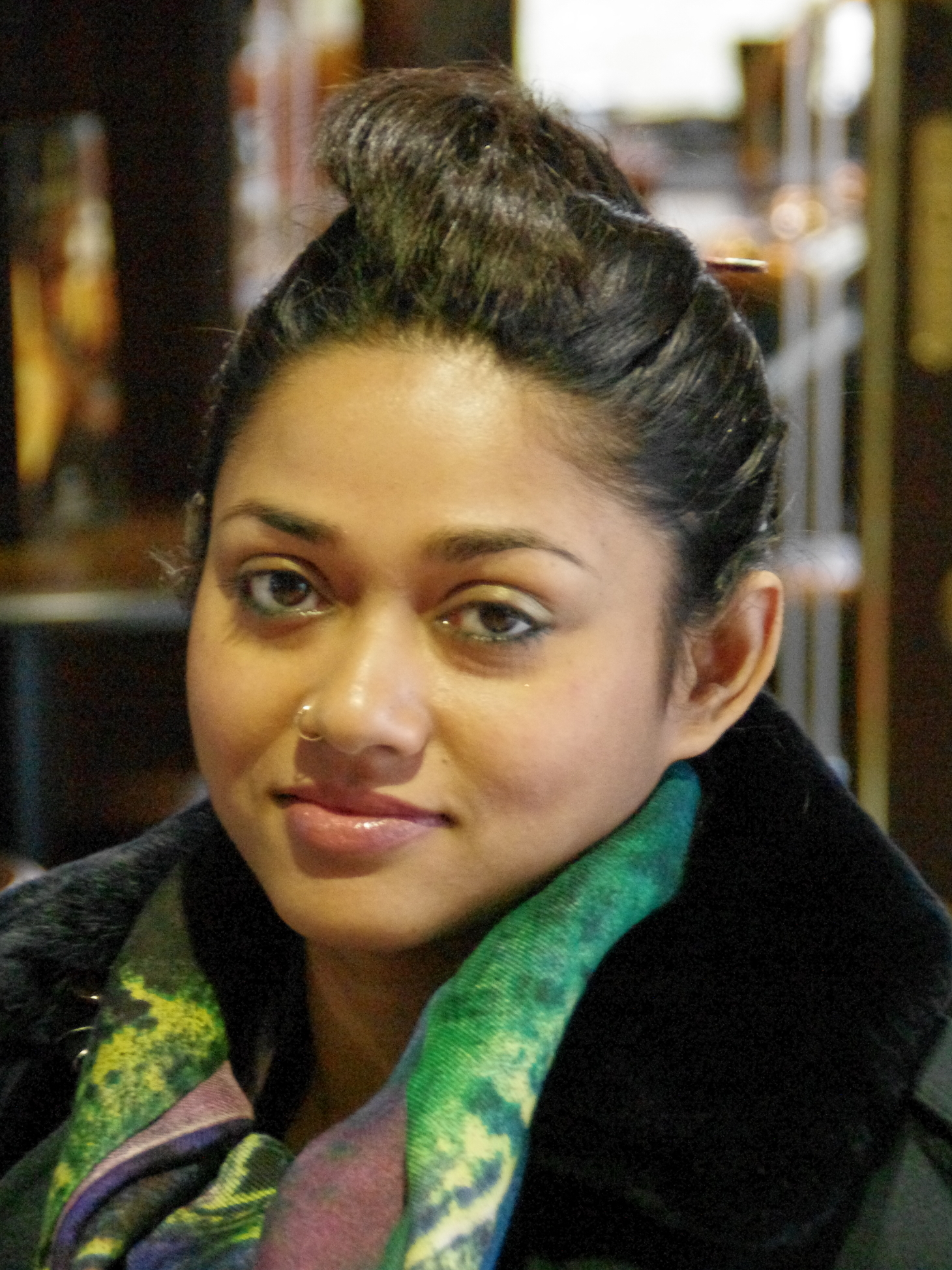
- Hossain in 2016
- Education: Smith College; University of Pennsylvania; New York University
- Occupations: Director, writer, producer
- Partner: Ashique Mostafa
- Website: rubaiyat-hossain.com

Rubaiyat Hossain is a Bangladeshi film director, writer, and producer. She made the films Meherjaan (2011), Under Construction (2015) and Made in Bangladesh (2019). In 2023, she became the second female director to win a Bangladesh National Film Award for Best Director, for Made in Bangladesh. Made in Bangladesh was listed in Criterion Collection's hidden-gems of the 2010s. Her fourth feature film, The Difficult Bride has been selected as a first bangladeshi film at the orizzonti section of the 83rd Venice Film Festival.

== Background and education ==
Rubaiyat Hossain was born to Syed Abul Hossain, a former Bangladeshi minister, a member of the parliament, and a businessman. Inspired by the works of Satyajit Ray, Rubaiyat pursued her interest in cinema and completed a diploma in film direction at the New York Film Academy in 2002. She has also completed a B.A. in women studies from Smith College, an M.A. in South Asian studies from the University of Pennsylvania, and an M.A. in cinema studies from Tisch School of the Arts at New York University in the United States. Her primary fields of interest are Sufism, Bengali nationalism, the formation of Bengali modernity and its correlation with female sexuality.

Hossain teaches film studies, women's studies, and South Asia studies at Smith College.

== Career ==
Hossain's works reflect social realism and use a feminist lens to deconstruct the otherwise phallocentric institution of cinema.

Hossain debuted as a feature filmmaker in 2011 with Meherjaan, a film about a Bengali woman's love affair with a Pakistani soldier during Bangladesh's 1971 war of independence. The film was controversial in Bangladesh and pulled down from cinema halls by its distributors just a week after its release.

Hossain's next film, Under Construction, was released in 2015 and tells the story of an urban middle-class woman in an unhappy marriage who plays the role of Nandini in Tagore's play Raktakarabi (Red Oleanders). It has been screened at film festivals around the world and received several awards. Including Prix du Jury International, FICA Vesoul; Mentions spéciales de la critique, FICA Vesoul; Prix Emile Guimet, FICA Vesoul (awarded by Guimet Museum in Paris); Best Audience Award, Dhaka International Film Festival; and two Bangladesh National Film Awards in Best Dialogue and Best Make-up.

Hossain's recent film, Made in Bangladesh, a Bangladesh-France-Denmark-Portugal joint-venture is premiered at the 2019 Toronto International Film Festival following the participation at BFI London Film Festival, Locarno Film Festival and other major festivals. This is a "film on Bangladesh's garment workers spotlights women driving change." Distributed by Pyramide Films, the film was widely released in France on 4 December 2019 and running for several months. Made in Bangladesh was listed in criterion collections hidden-gems of the 2010s as "The storytelling in the film is like the lead character—quiet, methodical, and tenacious, reminiscent of the great director Satyajit Ray."

Hossain is currently working on the fourth feature, a Bangladesh-Norway-France-Germany-USA Co production. The Sor fond jury termed Difficult Bride script "an atmospheric and immersive journey, and the jury was fascinated and intrigued by the poetic, yet grotesque, way the filmmaker is planning to visualise the protagonist's feelings and desires."

The Difficult Bride (2026) had its world premiere in the Orizzonti section of the 83rd Venice International Film Festival on 6 September 2026.

== Social work ==
Hossain has worked for prominent women's rights NGOs in Bangladesh such as Ain O Salish Kendra and Naripokkho. She was also the co-coordinator for the first international workshop on Sexuality and Rights organized by BRAC School of Public Health in 2007.

== Filmography ==
=== Feature films ===
| Year | English Title | Original Title | Notes |
|---|---|---|---|
| 2011 | Meherjaan | মেহেরজান | Also producer |
| 2015 | Under Construction | আন্ডার কন্সট্রাকশন | Also producer |
| 2019 | Made in Bangladesh | শিমু | Also producer |
| 2026 | The Difficult Bride | | Also producer |

== Accolades ==
- Winner, Best Director Award (For Made In Bangladesh / শিমু by the Ministry of Information and Broadcasting, People's Republic of Bangladesh (Highest State Honor and 2nd woman to receive this honor in Bangladesh)
- Prix Emile Guimet, honored by the Guimet Museum of Paris, France
- Premio Interfedi, Torino Film Festival
- Norwegian Peace Film Award, Tromsø International Film Festival
- Mahila Parishad Award – Honored by Bangladesh Mahila Parishad for the outstanding contribution in cinema.
- Public Award, African Diaspora International FF
- Jury Prize, Le Festival International du Film d'Amiens

== Khona Talkies ==
Hossain and her partner Ashique Mostafa established Khona Talkies in 2008 with the vision of using young Bangladeshi talent to produce films in a local terrain with possible foreign co-production and creative tie-ups. Since its inception, Khona Talkies has produced a few award-winning and internationally acclaimed as well as locally significant independent films by young filmmakers.

== Sultana's Dream ==
Hossain started Sultana's Dream, a funding and mentorship grant to empower, promote and support the next generation of women filmmakers and storytellers in Bangladesh, named after a 1902 novel by Begaum Rokeya, a pioneer of women's education in South Asia. For its pilot run, the program selected a cohort of 16 emerging women filmmakers who would receive basic filmmaking training across disciplines and guidance for preparing project dossiers and pitching, leadership workshops, script-writing modules, study circles encompassing feminist film history, the female gaze and gendered reading of film texts. Production grant and mentorship has been provided to three projects selected by an independent jury.
