= O Amar Desher Mati =

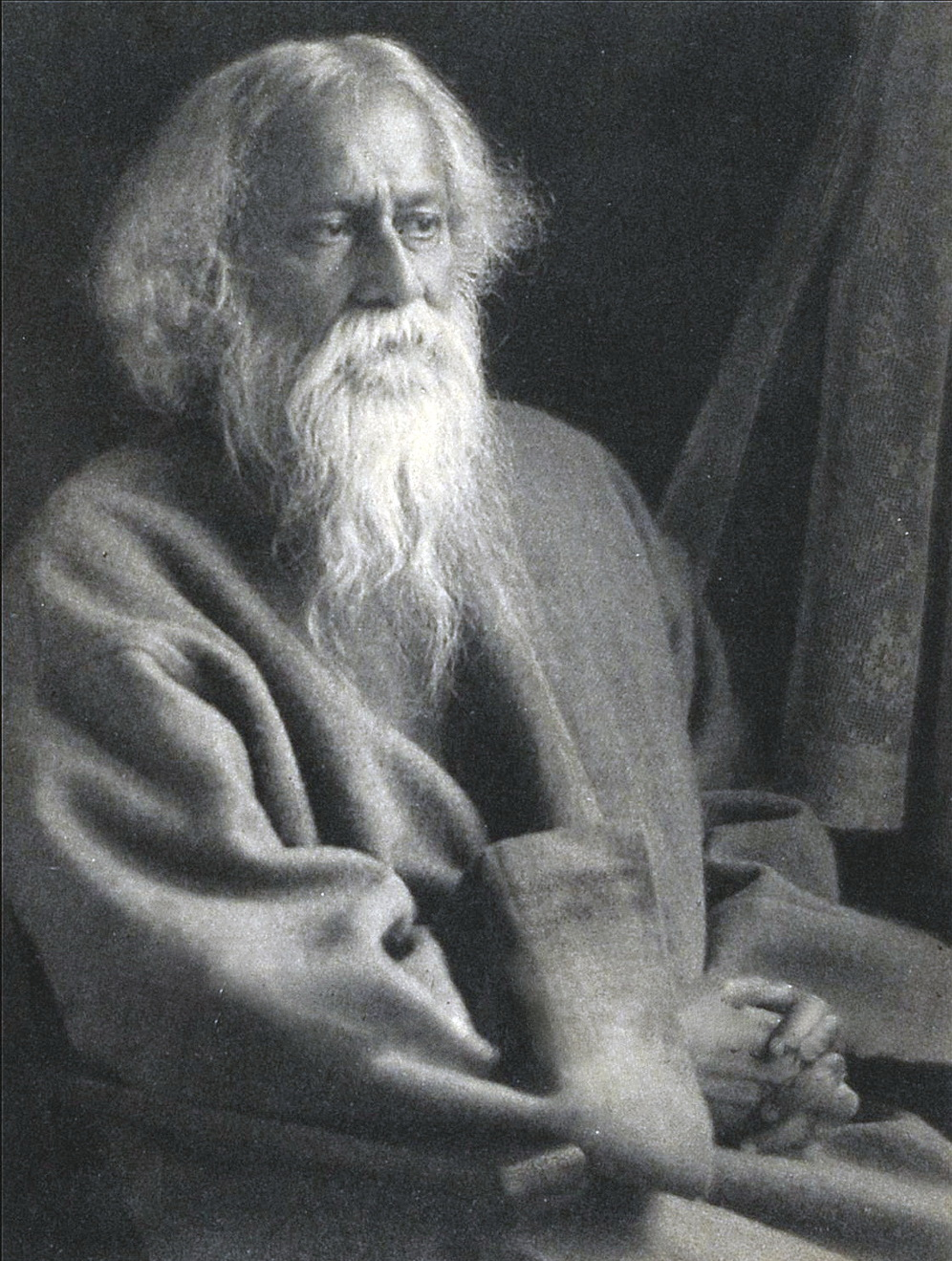

Song by Rabindranath Tagore
- Language: Bengali
- Written: 1905
- Genre: Rabindra Sangeet
- Songwriter: Rabindranath Tagore
- Composer: Rabindranath Tagore

"O Amar Desher Mati" (Bengali: ও আমার দেশের মাটি) is a Bengali patriotic song written by Rabindranath Tagore. It was written against the Partition of Bengal in 1905. Indira Debi Chowdhurani provided the notation of the song. This song belongs to the "Shawdesh" (patriotic) group of Rabindra Sangeet. It was composed in Pilu-Baul Raga and Dadra Taal.

== Legacy ==
Bengali revolutionary Krishnagopal Chowdhury sang this song on his way to death sentence given by the British Raj on charges of sedition in 1934. The song inspired the Bengali fighters during the Liberation War of Bangladesh. The song was used in the Bengali film Ora Egaro Jon directed by Chashi Nazrul Islam.

== Synopsis ==
The song recounts the narrative of the motherland's role as a nurturing entity towards her people, as well as the lamentable realization of their failure to reciprocate in kind.
