= Pratul Mukhopadhyay =

Indian Bengali-language singer and composer (1942–2025)

- প্রতুল মুখোপাধ্যায়
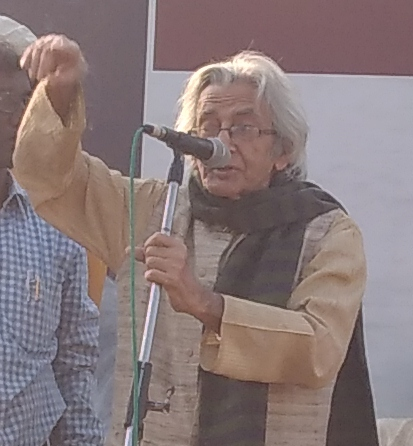
- Mukhopadhyay speaking at the 46th International Kolkata Book Fair
- Born: 20 September 1942; Barisal, Bengal Province, Bangladesh
- Died: 15 February 2025 (aged 82); Kolkata, West Bengal, India
- Occupations: Singer, songwriter, composer
- Known for: Writer and singer of the song Ami Banglay Gan Gai and other Bengali ' mass songs '
- Spouse: Sarbani Mukhopadhyay

Pratul Mukhopadhyay (25 June 1942 – 15 February 2025) was an Indian Bengali-language singer, creative artist, activist, and songwriter. He is the writer and the singer of the famous Bengali song Ami Banglay Gan Gai and Dinga Bhashao Sagore. He was a playback singer in the Bengali film Gosaibaganer Bhoot. Mukhopadhyay died at the SSKM Hospital, Kolkata, West Bengal, on 15 February 2025, at the age of 82.

== Works ==
=== Albums ===
- Pathorey Pathorey Naachey Aagun (1988) with various artists.
- Jete Hobey (1994)
- Ootho Hey (1994)
1. Chokra Chand Jowan Chand with Narration - Pratul Mukhopadhyay (3:49)
2. Lal kamla Halde Sabuj - Pratul Mukhopadhyay (3:20)
3. Darun Gabhor Theke - Pratul Mukhopadhyay (4:50)
4. Giyechhilam Lohar Hate with Narration - Pratul Mukhopadhyay (2:30)
5. Ki Amader Jaat - Pratul Mukhopadhyay (5:02)
6. Bhalobasar Manus - Pratul Mukhopadhyay (3:54)
7. Kancher Basaner Jhan Jhan Shabde - Pratul Mukhopadhyay (2:35)
8. Maa Selai Kare - Pratul Mukhopadhyay (4:41)
9. Sei Chhotto Duti paa - Pratul Mukhopadhyay (5:45)
10. Amra Dhan Katar Gaan Gai - Pratul Mukhopadhyay (3:43)
11. Nakosi Skele Africa - Pratul Mukhopadhyay (4:32)
12. Tui Chhenra Matir Buke Achhis - Pratul Mukhopadhyay (3:52)
13. Ei To Jano Pate - Pratul Mukhopadhyay (4:48)
- Kuttus Kottas (1997)
- Swapner Pheriwala (2000) with various artists
- Tomake Dekhchhilam (2000)
- Swapanpurey (2002)
- Aanek Natun Bandhu Hok (2004) with other artists
- Haw Jaw Baw Raw Law of Sukumar Ray (2004) Recitation and text reading
- Dui Kanur Upakshyan (2005) Recitation and text reading with various artists
- Aandhar Naame (2007)

=== Documentaries ===
- Songs of Pratul Mukhopadhyay – Produced by Anweshan, Directed by Manas Bhowmik
- Dinga Bhasao – Produced by Samakalin Chalchitra

=== Books ===
- Pratul Mukhopadhyayer Nirbachito Gaan (Selected Songs of Pratul Mukhopadhyay)
- Shakti-Rajniti (Power Politics)
