= Raima Islam Shimu =

Bangladeshi actress and director (died 2022)

- রাইমা ইসলাম শিমু
- Born: c. 1977 or 1987; Barisal, Bangladesh
- Disappeared: 16 January 2022
- Status: Died
- Cause of death: Murdered
- Body discovered: Keraniganj Upazila, Dhaka District, Bangladesh
- Occupations: Actor; film producer; film director

Raima Islam Shimu (c. 1977 or 1987 – after 16 January 2022) (Note: The Daily Star says that Shimu was born in 1977 and Jugantor says that she was born in 1987.) was a Bangladeshi actress, film producer and director. She who has starred in 24 films and numerous TV dramas since 1998. Shimu disappeared on 16 January 2022, and she was later murdered.

== Early life and career ==
Shimu was born in Barisal in c. 1977 or 1987.

Her first film was Bartaman (1998), directed by Kazi Hayat. Her final film appearance was in Jamai Shashur (2002).

== Murder ==
Shimu went missing on January 16, 2022. Shimu's husband Sakhawat Ali Nobel was depressed due to various reasons including closure of business. He gradually became suspicious of his wife being unfaithful. This led to marital quarrels, which eventually led to her death by her husband. Shimu reported her husband being abusive to the police sometimes earlier her death. Her husband and his friend planned and executed the murder, and later confessed to the police on January 19. Her dismembered dead body was found by police in Keraniganj Upazila in Dhaka District on 17 January 2022. The body was kept in the morgue of Sir Salimullah Medical College.
