= Noyeem Gahar =

- নয়ীম গহর
- Born: 15 August 1937
- Died: 8 October 2015; Dhaka, Bangladesh
- Resting place: Martyred Intellectual Cemetery, Mirpur, Dhaka
- Citizenship: Bangladeshi
- Awards: Independence Day Award (2012)

Noyeem Gahar (15 August 1937 – 7 October 2015) was a famous lyricist of Bangladesh. He was awarded the Independence Day Award in 2012 for his unique contribution in inspiring Mukti Bahini and the Bangladeshi people and forming public opinion through music during the Bangladesh Liberation war.

== Early life ==
Gahar was born on 15 August 1937 in Sepahipara village, Rampal union in Munshiganj Sadar Upazila, Munshiganj District.

== Career ==
During the Bangladesh Liberation war in 1971, his songs were used to boost the morale of Mukti Bahini soldiers. His songs included "Janma Amar Dhanya Holo Ma Go" and "Nongar Tolo Tolo Samay Yeh Holo Holo".

== Death ==
Gahar lost his memory following a brain stroke. He had an injury on his thigh and his back was injured from prolonged bed rest. As a result, he was admitted to Bangabandhu Sheikh Mujib Medical University Hospital in Dhaka and died there on 7 October 2015.
