= Censorship in Bangladesh =

Censorship in Bangladesh refers to the government censorship of the press and infringement of freedom of speech. Article 39 of the constitution of Bangladesh protects free speech subject to certain restrictions.

According to Human Rights Watch, the government of Bangladesh is using sophisticated equipment to block websites critical of the government and carrying out surveillance on online traffic. Brad Adams, Asia Director of Human Rights Watch, has accused Prime Minister Shiekh Hasina of marching towards authoritarianism through intimidating the free press and cracking down on freedom of expression. Editors told the HRW that they censor 50 to 80 percent of the stories they get as a form of self censorship to prevent trouble with the government. Asia Times has described Bangladesh as an Orwellian dystopia. Freedom of expression has declined in Bangladesh according to the Global Expression Report 2018–19 by Article 19.

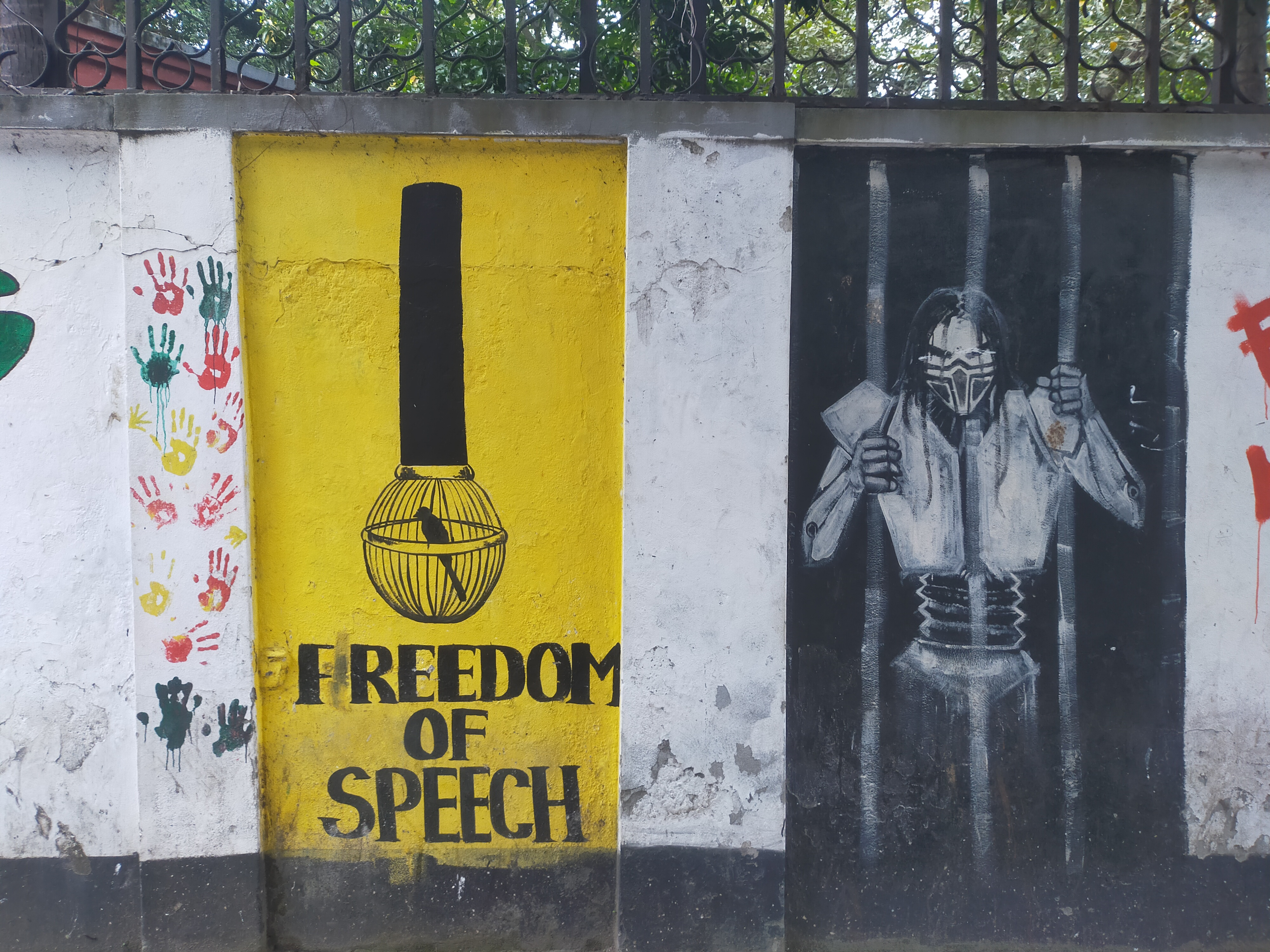
A graffiti of July revolution at Baily Road, Dhaka, reading, 'FREEDOM OF SPEECH '.

== History ==
The government has approved the usage of deep packet inspection to monitor web traffic. According to Freedom House, Bangladesh is partly free. Freedom House has reported that the Awami League government has consolidated its power through the intimidation of political rivals and journalists. The government of Bangladesh throttled internet speed during the 2018 Bangladesh road-safety protests to prevent information from being uploaded

In May 2019, the government of Bangladesh arrested three people, including a lawyer and poet, over content posted online.

The government of Bangladesh increased suppression of the press following the COVID-19 pandemic in Bangladesh. After Netra news, based in Sweden, claiming two million would die in the pandemic in Bangladesh, government intelligence agents visited the mother of its editor, Tasneem Khalil, in Sylhet. They made her call her son and ask him to stop publishing news against the government. They visited her after a warning against "rumors" by Hasan Mahmud, the Minister of Information. According to The Diplomat, any information that is deemed critical of Sheikh Hasina led Awami League is called "rumors" by the government. The government has suspended doctors, government officers, and academics for criticizing the government response to COVID-19.

As Part of an anti-pornography campaign the government of Bangladesh banned 20 thousand websites and blogs. Mustafa Jabbar, ICT Minister, described it as part of his "war on pornography". One of the blogged websites was somewhereinblog.net which is blogging website that bans explicit content and is a partner of Deutsche Welle. Jabbar supported the ban by stating that the website published content which was critical of the government and Islam.

In 2021, the Bangladeshi government was suspected to have used the Pegasus spyware.

== Laws ==
The Digital Security Act has been criticized as a tool to suppress the press. According to Reuters, the Digital Security Act had a chilling effect on free speech and the media. The law penalizes journalist for obtaining information, documents, and pictures from government offices without government authorization. This, according to Professor Asif Nazrul of Dhaka University, is a threat to investigative journalism in Bangladesh. The law allows the arrest of journalists without warrants and restricts bail. The editor of Manab Zamin, Matiur Rahman Chowdhury, reported that journalists were practicing self censorship. More than one thousand cases have been filed under this act according to Amnesty International, which describes the law as "draconian".

The Broadcast Act 2018 is a law designed to regulate broadcast media. The law allows the arrest of journalist without warrants and restricts bail. The law is aimed to crack down on talk shows on television.

=== Litigation ===
The government of Bangladesh and activists of Bangladesh Awami League have filled around 80 criminal cases against Mahfuz Anam, the editor of The Daily Star, in courts around the country forcing Anam to move around the country seeking bail in different courts. The cases seek 8 billion taka in damages from him. The government has also prevent Anam from covering events of Prime Minister Sheikh Hasina. In 2015, the government asked companies to stop advertising in The Daily Star. Anam was forced to reduce the number of editorials he wrote.

== Organizations ==
The National Telecommunication Monitoring Centre is able to block content critical of the government through the usage of “Content Blocking and Filtering System”. The Centre monitors all electronic communication in Bangladesh.

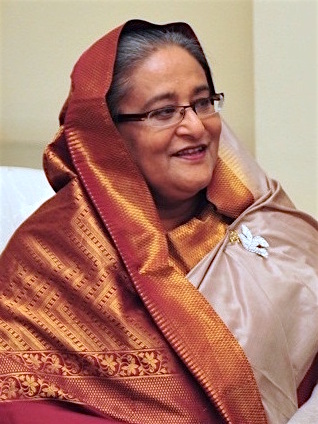
Sheikh Hasina has been accused of using law to silence dissent

== Games ==
Various games were blocked in the past like PUBG Mobile and Free Fire, etc.. A lot of different internet sites also cannot offer services in Bangladesh.

== Film ==
In 1991, Bangladesh Censor Board censored Remembrance of '71, a documentary by Tanvir Mokammel, on the Bangladesh Liberation war.

In 1994, Bangladesh Censor Board banned Nodir Naam Modhumoti, by Tanvir Mokammel, for being "anti-nationalistic".The film was released after Awami League returned to power.

In 1995, the Censor Board objected to Muktir Gaan, by Tareque Masud and Catherine Masud, as it believed the songs in the documentary were pro-Awami League, then the opposition party. The film was released after Awami League returned to power.

In 2005, the Ministry of Home Affairs tried to censor Teardrops of Karnaphuli, a documentary about the effect of Kaptai Dam on the indigenous community in Chittagong Hill Tracts. The documentary was made by Tanvir Mokammel.

In 2009, the Bangladesh Censor Board refused to allow the release of Nomuna, a satirical film by Enamul Karim Nirjhar, because of the film satirizing political figures of Bangladesh. The Censor board forced the removal of scene showing street harassment from the movie Third Person Singular Number.

In 2011, the Bangladesh Censor Board banned Hridoy Bhanga Dheu due to reason that the main villain in the movie wore a Mujib Coat, a coat worn by Sheikh Mujibur Rahman.

=== List of banned films ===
Date	Title	Notes
1991	Remembrance of '71	This documentary by Tanvir Mokammel, on the Bangladesh Liberation war was banned by the Bangladesh Film Censor Board.
1994	Nodir Naam Modhumoti	This film was banned for being "anti-nationalistic". The director Tanvir Mokammel appealed the ban to the Bangladesh Supreme Court, and then, to the Bangladesh High Court. The film eventually was released in 1996, after the Awami League returned to power.
1995	Muktir Gaan	This documentary by Tareque Masud and Catherine Masud was objected by the Censor Board out of concern that the songs featured in it were pro-Awami League. Overturned in 1996.
2005	Teardrops of Karnaphuli	This documentary by Tanvir Mokammel about the effects of Kaptai Dam on the indigenous community in Chittagong Hill Tracts was banned in Bangladesh.
2009	Nomuna	This satirical film by Enamul Karim Nirjhar had its release refused by the Censor Board for its satire of political figures of Bangladesh.
2011	Hridoy Bhanga Dheu	This film was banned because the main villain in the film wore a Mujib Coat, a coat worn by Sheikh Mujibur Rahman, the first President of Bangladesh.
2015	Mor Thengari	This Chakma language film (which was the first of its kind) was refused certification by the Censor Board as the Bangladesh Army lodged a complaint that the film showed the activities of the army in the Chittagong Hill Tracts which is a sensitive issue, as well for their negative portrayal (along with the police forces') during the Chittagong Hill Tracts conflict. The Ministry of Information in a letter to the Censor board objecting to some scenes of the film, requesting their deletion. The director, Aung Rakhine, withdrew the film rather than cut it, accusing the Censor Board of violating human rights.
2016	Rana Plaza	This film about a garment factory worker's 17-day fight to survive under the debris of Rana Plaza, a building that collapsed on 24 April 2013, was banned by the Bangladesh Film Censor Board due to a petition from the Bangladesh National Garment Workers League chief Sirajul Islam, as the film featured scenes considered "frightening" as well the names of security forces, which is considered a breach of the law.
2023	Faraaz	Faraaz, directed by Hansal Mehta, was released on 3 February 2023, in India and received mixed reviews from critics. This film is based on the 2016 Dhaka attack wherein 29 people were killed, including 20 hostages (17 foreigners and 3 locals), two police officers, five gunmen, and two bakery staff. Ruba Ahmed, the mother of Abinta Kabir, who was killed by militants in the Holey Artisan Attack on 1 July 2016, filed the writ on 12 February 2023. After hearing that writ petition, the High Court bench of Md. Khasruzzaman and Justice Md Iqbal Kabir delivered this order to ban this misleading film.

In 2015, Bangladesh Censor Board delayed the release of the first Chakma, an ethnic minority in Bangladesh, language film Mor Thengari by refusing to give certification to the film. The Ministry of Information in a letter to the Censor board object to some scenes of the film and requested their deletion. The director, Aung Rakhine, withdrew the film rather than cut it.

== Press ==
The Press in Bangladesh started facing restrictions in 1974 after the start of one party BAKSAL rule.

The free press felt further censorship under the subsequent military regimes. Following the reinstatement of democracy in 1991, the press started to flourish again.

In 2002, the Bangladesh Nationalist Party government banned the private news network ETV.

In 2008, the Military backed caretaker government banned Sachalayatan, a blogging website.

In 2009, Bangladesh Awami League government blocked YouTube over videos critical of the government management of the 2009 Bangladesh Rifles Mutiny.

In 2010, the government blocked Facebook over images critical of Islam.

In 2012, the government blocked YouTube over videos critical of Islam.

In 2013, Bangladesh Telecommunication Regulatory Commission asked ISPs to reduce the upload bandwidth due to piracy concerns but it was speculated that it was done to prevent uploading videos critical of the government.

In 2015, the government blocked social media sites for 22 days following protests the verdicts of International Crimes Tribunal. The government also monitors bloggers in the country. A leaked report showed that blogger killed in Bangladesh overlapped with those under surveillance of the state.

In 2016, the government of Bangladesh blocked 35 news websites without any explanation.

In May 2017, the government of Bangladesh blocked a website of Swedish Radio after it published a report containing a confessional statement over extrajudicial murders by an officer of Rapid Action Battalion.

In 2017, the government of Bangladesh blocked The Wire, an Indian newspaper, following a report on Directorate General of Forces Intelligence abducting an academic.

From 1 to 2 June 2018, the government of Bangladesh blocked the website of The Daily Star for in-depth investigation into the drug trade.

In August 2018, Shahidul Alam, was arrested after he an interview critical of the government of Bangladesh on Al Jazeera English.

On 20 March 2019, the government blocked aljazeera.com after it published report that implicated Major General Tarique Ahmed Siddique, Defense Advisor to Prime Minister Sheikh Hasina, in the abduction of his business associates. The Joban, a Bengali language news website, was blocked after publishing the report on Tarique Ahmed Siddique. In this cases both websites were blocked by intelligence agencies circumventing Bangladesh Telecommunication Regulatory Commission and proper procedure.

In January 2020, the government of Bangladesh blocked Netra news, a Swedish-based news website, after they published a report accusing Obaidul Quader of corruption and used pictures of him wearing expensive watches including a 34 thousand dollar Rolex.

In 2020, Shafiqul Islam Kajol became a victim of forced disappearance in Bangladesh for 53 days. After he reappeared, he was arrested and detained under the Digital Security Act. Amnesty International has called him a prisoner of conscience. He had published an article on a prostitution ring operated by female Awami League leader. Matiur Rahman Chowdhury, editor of Manab Zamin, was also accused in the case over the prostitution report. The cases were filled by Saifuzzaman Shikhor, a Member of Parliament and former Assistant Personal Secretary of Prime Minister Sheikh Hasina.

=== Journalists ===
In July 2018, Mahmudur Rahman, editor of Amar Desh, had been attacked while coming out of a court in Kushtia. He is known to be sympathetic to the opposition Bangladesh Nationalist Party. He had been attacked by activists of Bangladesh Chhatra League, the student wing of the ruling Awami League. He was left bleeding with pictures of his injuries going viral on social media

In March 2020, executive magistrates detained and sentenced Ariful Islam, correspondent of Dhaka Tribune and Bangla Tribune. He had been tortured, threatened with execution, and sentenced without proper evidence by Executive Magistrate Bikash Chakma. He had been arrested after he wrote news reports against Sultana Pervin, Kurigram District Deputy Commissioner. His arrested was condemned by Editors' Council. The government suspended those who were involved with the arrest, Rintu Chakma, Nazim Uddin, and SM Rahatul Islam. Ariful had been sentenced to one year imprisonment at a trial in the middle of the night at Pervin's office. On 23 March 2020, Bangladesh High Court ordered Bangladesh Police to file attempted murder charges against Sultana Pervin and others.

From 5 August 2024 until the end of 2025, according to UN special rapporteur Irene Khan, hundreds of journalists had been arrested on "politically motivated, dubious charges of murder, terrorism and other serious crimes", and many were subjected to prolonged arbitrary detentions.

== Books ==
In 2002, the government of Bangladesh banned Wild Wind by Taslima Nasreen. This was the third book of Taslima that was banned by the government of Bangladesh. She had been force to flee Bangladesh after the publication of her novel Lajja, which had been deemed blasphemous. Her second book, My Girlhood, was also banned for blasphemy.

In 2010, the government of Bangladesh ordered the removal of all books written by Syed Abul Ala Maududi, founder of Jamaat-e-Islami party, from mosques and libraries. The government stated that his books promoted extremism.

Bangladesh banned two fictional books, Dia Arefin and Diya Arefiner Nanir Bani, in 2020 for hurting religious sentiments. The books were banned following a court order by Bangladesh High Court. They had been written by Diarshi Arag, a secular writer.

== See also ==
- List of defamation of religion cases under section 57 in Bangladesh
- List of films banned in Bangladesh
