= Kagojer Phul =

- Bengali: কাগজের ফুল
- Written by: Tareque Masud
- Screenplay by: Tareque Masud; Catherine Masud
- Story by: Tareque Masud
- Produced by: Government of Bangladesh
- Starring: Jayanta Chattopadhyay
- Production company: Audiovision
- Country: Bangladesh
- Language: Bengali

Kagojer Phul (Bengali: কাগজের ফুল, The Paper Flower) is an unfinished Bangladeshi epic drama film. The film is based on the life of Tareque Masud's father. Based on Tareque's story, the screenplay was co-written by Tareque and his wife Catherine Masud. Kagojer Phul will be a prequel set on the younger life of Masud’s father, who portrayals in Matir Moina.

== Background ==
On 13 August 2011, Tareque Masud and media personality Mishuk Munier died in a road accident while returning to Dhaka from Manikganj on the Dhaka-Aricha highway after visiting the filming location of Kagojer Phul. Bangladesh prime minister Sheikh Hasina assured to extend her support for making the film. Hasina said, "Muktir Gaan was a bright ray of light in the dark. She also said she would extend her support to complete Kagojer Phul.

== Pre-production ==
In 2012, they received a grant from the National Film Grant award from the Bangladesh Government for the production of films. Jayanta Chattopadhyay is to be one of the actors of the film.

== Cast ==
- Jayanta Chattopadhyay as Kazi

== Sequel ==
A sequel titled Matir Moina was released in 2002. The film is set against the backdrop of unrest period in East Pakistan in the late 1960s leading up to the Bangladesh War of Liberation. Kagojer Phul, would follow younger Kazi, the main character of Matir Moina (based on Masud's father), and zoom in on his years in Calcutta (now Kolkata) from 1945 to 1947. The film would show how Kazi's character was shaped by the riots in Calcutta and partition of Bengal.
