= Runway (2010 film) =

Bangladeshi film

- Runway film poster
- Directed by: Tareque Masud
- Written by: Tareque Masud; Catherine Masud
- Produced by: Catherine Masud
- Starring: Fazlul Haque; Rabeya Akter Moni; Ali Ahsan; Nazmul Huda Bachchu
- Cinematography: Mishuk Munier
- Edited by: Catherine Masud
- Music by: Tareque Masud; Catherine Masud
- Production company: Zingo Films
- Distributed by: Audio Vision
- Release date: 16 December 2010 (Bangladesh)
- Running time: 90 minutes
- Country: Bangladesh
- Language: Bengali

Runway (Bengali: রানওয়ে) is a 2010 Bangladeshi drama film directed by Tareque Masud, his final feature film before his death. The screenplay was co-written by Masud and his wife Catherine Masud. The film was inspired from the 2005 Bangladesh terrorist attack.

The film explores the complex issue of Islamic extremism in Bangladesh through the story of Ruhul, a young boy living in poverty near an international airport. Disillusioned and unemployed, Ruhul becomes entangled with a charismatic figure who introduces him to a radical ideology.

Runway garnered critical acclaim for its social commentary, realistic portrayal of contemporary Bangladesh, and performances by its cast. It often comes in the lists of one of the best Bangladeshi films ever made.

== Plot ==
.Ruhul, a young man, lives in a small hut near an international airport with his sister, Fatema, his mother, and his grandfather. Fatema works at a garment factory and goes to work early in the morning with her coworker Sheuli. Ruhul often visits his uncle's shop, who runs an internet café, to learn about the internet. There he meets a man named Arif, who teaches him how to use the internet. They soon become friends and start talking about political issues in the world regarding Muslims. Arif convinces Ruhul that he can get him a job at the airport. Later, Arif takes Ruhul to a mosque where a terrorist leader was hiding. He brainwashes Ruhul into thinking that religious terrorism is the only way to save the world from western influence.

Ruhul's mother becomes intimidated by his change in personality and becomes stressed about her son's extremist ideologies. Ruhul often leaves home for some time to train with his other militant companions and tries to convince his mother that he is fine and will soon start to earn money by the path he has chosen. Sheuli tells Ruhul that her father has arranged her marriage with a drug addict, whom she refuses to marry, and confronts her love for Ruhul. However, Ruhul rejects her to save her and tells her that it's none of his concern.

The terrorists stage an attack on a theater, which is led by Arif. The police begin to investigate the attack and arrest Ruhul's uncle on suspicion of having affiliations with the terrorists. The terrorists plan to bomb a van carrying the chief justice of the court, which is also led by Arif. The attack goes off, and Arif somehow manages to survive it but is heavily injured and captured by the police. Ruhul later finds out that the terrorist group was affiliated with a political party and was receiving internal support from them. The group leader goes fugitive and suggests Ruhul and his companions do the same.

Ruhul later realizes that he was brainwashed and acknowledges his mistakes. He hallucinates his father coming from abroad, who lost contact with his family during the Arab Spring.

== Production ==
The lyrics of the songs in the movie were written by Tareque Masud.

== Cast ==
- Fazlul Haque as Ruhul
- Rabeya Akter Moni as Rahima
- Ali Ahsan as Arif
- Nazmul Huda Bachchu as Ruhul's Grandfather
- Nasrin Akter as Fatema
- Rikita Nandini Shimu as Sheuli
- Nurul Islam Bablu as Urdu Vai
- Jayanta Chattopadhyay as Ruhul's Uncle
- Nusrat Imroz Tisha as Selina
