= Muktir Kotha =

- Words of Freedom
- Directed by: Tareque Masud; Catherine Masud
- Based on: Bangladesh Liberation War
- Produced by: Tareque Masud
- Cinematography: Mishuk Munier
- Edited by: Catherine Masud; Fauzia Khan
- Production company: Audiovision
- Release date: 1999
- Running time: 80 minutes
- Country: Bangladesh
- Language: Bengali

Muktir Kotha (Bengali: মুক্তির কথা, Words of Freedom) is a 1999 Bangladeshi drama film directed by Tareque Masud and Catherine Masud. Muktir Kotha follows a group of young men and women began traversing the far corner of Bangladesh projectionists from 1996 to 1999, showing Muktir Gaan, a documentary on the 1971 Bangladesh Liberation War. The film screenings prompted the villagers to share their own stories of wartime suffering and resistance. Often the projection space would be spontaneously transformed into a folk concert. Through these interactions with village audiences, the young projectionist came to 'relearn' the wider history of the Liberation War, and the continuing struggle of ordinary people for a more just and democratic society.

== Synopsis ==
Muktir Katha is a film about the liberation struggle of 1971. The film is an archive of how the ordinary people fell victim to atrocities of the war. The struggle is still raging in the countryside, and struggle for a more just and democratic society. The combined footage shot used in the film was taken from American film maker Lear Levin.

== DVD ==
The DVD of Muktir Kotha was released on 25 March 2012 by Laser Vision. It is thought to be the first interactive DVD in Bangladesh.
