= Noroshundor =

- Official film poster
- Bengali: নরসুন্দর
- Directed by: Tareque Masud; Catherine Masud
- Written by: Tareque Masud (script)
- Story by: Tareque Masud
- Starring: Anwar Hossain; Sultana Rebu; Thomas Baroi
- Cinematography: Mishuk Munier
- Edited by: Catherine Masud
- Production companies: Audiovision; RMMRU
- Release date: 2009
- Running time: 15 mins
- Country: Bangladesh
- Language: Urdu

Noroshundor (The Barbershop) is a 2009 Bengali political thriller short set in 1971 during Bangladesh Liberation War. It was directed by Tareque Masud and Catherine Masud. It deals with nationalism and identity issue daring the war.

== Plot ==
In 1971, during Bangladesh Liberation War, Pakistan Army led a local collaborator raid at homes in search for freedom fighters. The young man they seek flees through the narrow alleyways of Old Dhaka and stumbles upon a barbershop. He quickly decides to get a shave to disguise himself. Meanwhile, his mother takes his injured father to a nearby pharmacy. The Hindu doctor hesitantly takes them in because of not getting into target. At the barbershop, the young man soon realizes he has put himself in more danger, where all the barbers are Urdu-speaking Biharis, who are also known to be supporting the Pakistan Army.

== Cast ==
- Anwar Hossain
- Sultana Rebu
- Thomas Baroi
- Members of the Bihari community
