= Shaheen Samad =

- শাহীন সামাদ
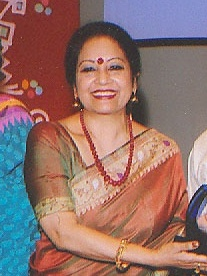
- Samad in Dhaka (2015)
- Born: 27 December 1952 (age 72); Kushtia, East Bengal, Dominion of Pakistan
- Occupation: Singer
- Spouse: Habib Us Samad
- Parents: Samsul Huda (father); Shamsun Nahar Rahima Khatun (mother)
- Website: shaheensamad.com

Shaheen Samad (born 27 December 1952) is a Bangladeshi Nazrul Sangeet singer. She was awarded Ekushey Padak in 2016 by the Government of Bangladesh.

== Early life ==
Samad was born in Kushtia to Shamsun Nahar Rahima Khatun and Samsul Huda. She spent her childhood at Jalpaiguri mostly. She took lessons from Ram Gopal, Fazlul Haque Mia, Sanjida Khatun and Ful Mohammad. She entered Chhayanaut at the age of 13. After coming back from London she learned singing from Sudhin Das.

== Career ==
Samad is a former artiste of the Swadhin Bangla Betar Kendra, the clandestine radio station broadcast to revolutionaries and occupied population during the Bangladesh Liberation War. During the Liberation War in 1971, Samad joined a cultural troupe, named Bangladesh Mukti Shangrami Shilpi Shangstha. They used to travel to refugee camps and different areas in Mukta Anchal, perform patriotic songs, arrange puppet shows and stage dramas to inspire the freedom fighters and people with the spirit of war.

She completed her studies and moved to England in 1974.

== Popular culture ==
In 1995, Samad was featured in the documentary film Muktir Gaan Directed by Tareque Masud and Catherine Masud.

== Awards ==
- Ekushey Padak (2016)
- Bangladesh Mohila Poroshod Award (2009)
- 9th North America Nazrul Conference Award (2004)
- Justice Abu Sayeed Chowdhury Award (2002)
- Shetubondhon Award (2001)
- Amra Surjomukhi Award (2000)
- National Press Club Award (2000)
- Poush Mela Award (2000)
- Bangladesh Deputy High Commission Award (1999)
- Bangladesh Human Rights Foundation Award (1998)
- Rotary club of Shamoly Award (1997)
- Dilip Kumar Ray Sotoborsho Award (1997)

== Personal life ==
Samad is married to Habib Us Samad.
