= Moushumi Bhowmik =

Indian Bengali singer-songwriter, researcher

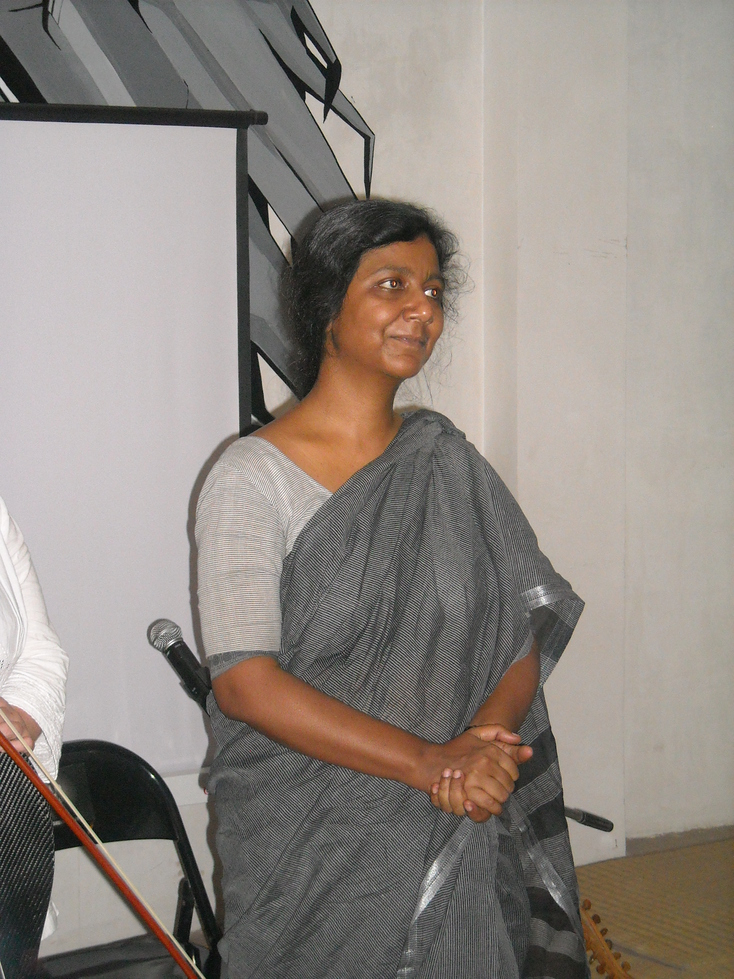
- Bhowmik in 2012

Background information
- Born: 29 December 1964 (age 61); Jalpaiguri, West Bengal, India
- Origin: Kolkata, West Bengal, India
- Genres: Contemporary, Folk, Rabindrasangeet
- Occupations: Singer, songwriter, composer, researcher, archivist, writer, translator, editor
- Years active: 1994–present
- Website: thetravellingarchive.org

Moushumi Bhowmik (born 29 December 1964) is an Indian singer-songwriter, writer and researcher based in Kolkata, she is known to perform Bengali folk songs, as well as her own compositions. She has released four albums― Tumio Chil Hao (1994), Ekhono Galpo Lekho (2000), Ami Ghor Bahir Kori (2001), Songs from 26H (2017). She has composed for documentaries and art cinema. Bhowmik created The Travelling Archive, based on field recordings from Bengal. Moushumi Bhowmik holds a PhD from the School of Cultural Texts and Records, Jadavpur University for her work on the wax cylinder recordings of Arnold Bake from Bengal from the 1930s. The title of her PhD thesis is 'Songs of Absence and Presence: Listening to the Arnold Bake Wax Cylinders from Bengal 1931-34'.

== Family and early life ==
Moushumi Bhowmik was born on 29 December 1964 at Jalpaiguri, a small town of West Bengal, India. Moushumi's father Bhupendranath Bhowmik, who was originally from Pabna District of East Bengal (Now Bangladesh), moved to West Bengal for education and a job. Her mother Anita Sengupta (Bhowmik)'s family was originally from Barisal District of East Bengal (now Bangladesh), but they settled in Jalpaiguri before the partition of India. Moushumi is the youngest of two children of her parents. Her elder sister Goutami is a mathematician. Moushumi Bhowmik lived in Shillong for the first sixteen years of her life, with three years in between in Agartala. Later she went on to Santiniketan.

== Education ==
Moushumi Bhowmik attended Pine Mount School in Shillong and for higher school education was sent to Santiniketan. She completed her graduation and post-graduation from the Department of English, Jadavpur University. Moushumi Bhowmik submitted her doctoral thesis on the ethnographic field recordings from Bengal of Arnold Bake, at the School of Cultural Texts and Records, Jadavpur University, and was awarded a PhD in November 2022.

== Works ==
Moushumi Bhowmik has lived in many places since her childhood, including Shillong, Santiniketan, Kolkata and London, and extensively travelled in Bangladesh. She started her career as a journalist by joining The Statesman as a sub-editor. In 1996, she joined Stree, a Kolkata-based independent publisher on gender and society, as an editor and began and developed Stree's Bengali titles. She began to write songs in Bangla in the 1990s.

Bhowmik formed a band named Parapar in 2002 with members from Kolkata and London. The band aimed to stress the continuity between diverse musical traditions– kirtan, bhatiyali, the blues and both Indian and Western classical music– blending them into a subtle and distinctive musical language. They also drew upon folk material collected by Moushumi from West Bengal, Assam and Bangladesh.

Bhowmik composed for Matir Moina (The Clay Bird, dir. Tareque Masud), which won the Critics' Prize at Cannes in 2002 and Best Music at Kara Film Festival, Karachi in 2003. She has also composed and sang for some documentaries and art cinema films.

In 2003, Bhowmik embarked on a journey of recording and documenting the tradition of Bengali folk music, covering mainly Bangladesh and the eastern Indian state of West Bengal and some adjoining areas of Assam in the east of South Asia; even distant locations such as the Bengali/Bangladeshi neighbourhoods of East London. She is the co-creator of the field recordings-based project in Bengal called The Travelling Archive, where she explored new avenues of research and dissemination, including archiving and working with archival material, writing and publication, presentation-performance and lectures, collaboration with museums and art galleries, and launching a record label with selections of field recordings.

Her work is included in the Women's Revolutions Per Minute (WRPM) archive, a collection dedicated to music by women, now housed in Special Collections at Goldsmiths, University of London.

== Writings ==
Moushumi Bhowmik's essays have been published in both English and Bengali journals, regional as well as international. Her essays have been included in several volumes on music and sound, including On Listening (London and Sheffield: CRiSAP and RGAP, 2013), edited by Cathy Lane and Angus Carlyle and Poetics and Politics of Sufism and Bhakti in South Asia: Love, Loss and Liberation (New Delhi: Orient Blackswan, 2011), edited by Kavita Panjabi. She has written and translated for children and has edited anthology of Bengali Muslim women's writings.

== Discography ==
- Matir Moyna (2002)
- Ami Ghor Bahir Kori (2001)
- Ekhono Golpo Lekho (2000)
- Tumio Cheel Hao (1994)
- Songs from 26H (2017)
- Rainbow Jelly Film (2018)
