= Ontarjatra =

2006 Bangladeshi film

- The Homeland
- Directed by: Tareque Masud; Catherine Masud
- Written by: Tareque Masud; Catherine Masud
- Produced by: Tareque Masud
- Starring: Sara Zaker; Jayanta Chattopadhyay; Rifaquat Rasheed; Abdul Momin Chowdhury; Raisa Nawar
- Cinematography: Gaëtane Rousseau
- Edited by: Catherine Masud
- Music by: Harold Rasheed; Buno
- Distributed by: British Council; Audiovision; Maasranga Productions Ltd. Hubert Bals Fund
- Release date: 29 January 2006 (United Kingdom)
- Running time: 85 minutes
- Country: Bangladesh
- Languages: English; Bengali; Sylheti

Ontarjatra (Bengali: অন্তর্যাত্রা; Homeland) is a 2006 Bangladeshi drama film directed by Tareque Masud and Catherine Masud. Upon its release in 2006, the film achieved critical and commercial success. It won for Best Direction at International Film Festival Bangladesh in 2006. Special Jury Award at Osian's Cinefan Festival Delhi in 2006.

== Synopsis ==
Ontorjatra (literally meaning "inner journey") is a Bengali intimate exploration of the complex issues of dislocation and identity in a diasporic world. After 15 years in the UK, Shireen and her son Sohel return to their home in Sylhet, Bangladesh for the funeral of Sohel's father. For Shireen the homecoming allows her to make peace with her ex-husband and his family, for Sohel, the journey allows him to connect with a family and a "homeland" he has never known.

== Cast ==
- Sara Zaker as Shireen
- Jayanto Chattopadhyay as Iqbal
- Rifaquat Rasheed as Sohail
- Abdul Momen Choudhury as Grandfather
- Rokeya Prachy as Salma
- Harold Rasheed as Khaled
- Nasrine R. Karim as Najma
- Raisa Nawar as Rini
- Lakkhan Das as Lakkhan
- Ria Ahmed as Bithi

Guest appearances

- Anusheh Anadil
- Buno
