= Jayanta Chattopadhyay =

Bangladeshi actor and reciter

Jayanto Chattopadhyay
- জয়ন্ত চট্টোপাধ্যায়
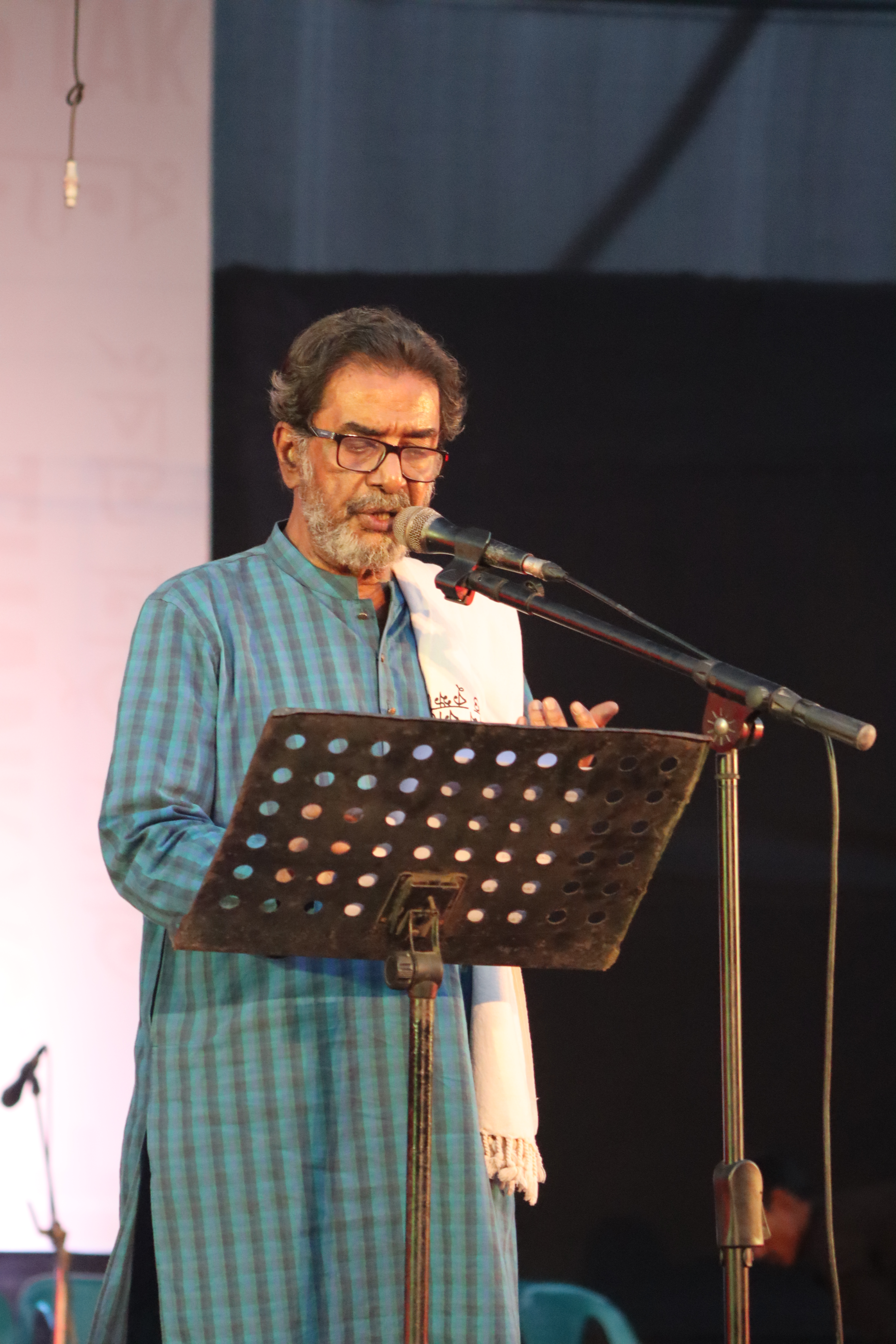
- Born: 28 July 1946 (age 80); Satkhira, Bengal, British India
- Occupations: Actor, Reciter, executive producer
- Years active: 1971–present
- Children: 2

Jayanto Chattopadhyay (born 28 July 1946) is a Bangladeshi actor and reciter. He studied English literature from Calcutta University. He portrayed the famous character Misir Ali in a television drama named Trishna.

== Works ==
=== Films ===
- Adam Surat (1989)
- Kittonkhola (2000)
- Matir Moina (2002) (The Clay Bird)
- Adhiar (2003)
- Joyjatra (2004)
- Ontarjatra (2006)
- Nirontor (2006)
- Banshi (2007)
- Noy Number Bipod Sanket (2007)
- The Last Thakur (2008)
- Runway (2010)
- Opekkha (2010)
- Ghetuputra Komola (2012)
- Pita - The Father (2012)
- Shikhandi Kotha (2013)
- Sutopar Thikana (2015)
- Death of a Poet (2017)
- Matir Projar Deshe (2018)
- Padmar Prem (2019)
- Kagojer Phul (TBA)
- Amar Ache Jol (2008)
- Krishnopokkho (2016)
- Birotto (2022)
- A House Named Shahana (2023)

=== Drama serials ===
- Bishaash (2010)
- Kala Koitor (2012)

=== Dramas ===
- Trishna
- Lilaboti
- Khela

=== Web series ===
Year	Title	OTT	Character	Director	Notes
2020	Contract	ZEE5		Tanim Noor	
2020	Ladies and Gentlemen	ZEE5		Mostofa Sarwar Farooki	
2022	Karagar	Hoichoi		Syed Ahmed Shawki	
2025	AKA	Hoichoi		Vicky Zahed	

== See also ==
- Cinema of Bangladesh
- Bangladeshi film actor
