= A Kind of Childhood =

2002 Bangladeshi film

- Directed by: Tareque Masud; Catherine Masud
- Edited by: Catherine Masud
- Production companies: Audiovision; Xingu Films (UK)
- Release date: 2002
- Running time: 50 minutes
- Country: Bangladesh
- Languages: English; Bengali

A Kind of Childhood is a 2002 Bangladeshi drama film directed by the husband and wife duo Tareque and Catherine Masud. The film was awarded the Jury Prize at the International Video Festival of India in 2003.

== Awards ==
Wins

- 2003 Jury Prize — International Video Festival of India
