= SM Sultan =

Bangladeshi painter (1923–1994)

- শেখ মুহাম্মদ সুলতান
- Self-Portrait
- Born: Sheikh Mohammed Sultan; 10 August 1923; Narail, Bengal, British India
- Died: 10 October 1994 (aged 71); Jessore, Khulna, Bangladesh
- Resting place: Narail, Khulna, Bangladesh
- Education: Government School of Art
- Known for: Painting, drawing
- Notable work: First Plantation (1975); Char Dakhal (1976); Harvesting (1986); Fishing-3 (1991)
- Awards: Ekushey Padak; 1982 Bangladesh Charu Shilpi Sangsad Award; 1986 Independence Day Award; 1993

Sheikh Mohammed Sultan (Bengali: শেখ মহম্মদ সুলতান; 10 August 1923 – 10 October 1994), popularly known as S M Sultan, was a Bengali decolonial artist who worked in painting and drawing. His fame rests on his striking depictions of exaggeratedly muscular Bengali peasants engaged in the activities of their everyday lives. Sultan's early works were influenced by western technics and forms, particularly impressionism, however, in his later works particularly, works exhibited in 1976, we discover there is a constant temptation to decolonize his art technics and forms.

For his achievement in fine arts he was awarded with the Ekushey Padak in 1982; the Bangladesh Charu Shilpi Sangsad Award in 1986; and the Independence Day Award in 1993. His works are held in several major collections in Bangladesh, including the Bangladesh National Museum, the National Art Gallery (Bangladesh), the S.M. Sultan Memorial Museum, and the Bengal Foundation.

== Early life ==
Sultan was born in Machimdia village, in what was then Jessore District, British India (now Narail District, Bangladesh) on 10 August 1923. After five years of primary education at Victoria Collegiate School in Narail, he went to work for his father, a mason. Even as a child he felt a strong artistic urge. He seized every opportunity to draw with charcoal, and developed his talent depicting the buildings his father worked on. Sultan wanted to study art in Calcutta (Kolkata), but his family did not have the means to send him. Eventually, he secured financial support from the local zamindar and went to Calcutta in 1938.

Meanwhile, Sultan joined Allama Mashriqi's Khaksar movement in British India. Mustafa Zaman in his article entitled "Revisiting Lal Mia's vision" wrote: "His fluid movements through myriad social geographies and his proximity with some unique personalities, his engagement with Allama Mashriqi's Khaksar movement that sought to organise the 'self' and 'Muslim sociality' to lay the ground for decolonisation; and his sojourns in America and Europe prepared him for his canvases which soon became populated with muscular men and women. These were obvious references to the peasant population he became part of".

There poet and art critic Hasan Shahid Suhrawardy restyled him S. M. Sultan and offered him accommodation in his home and the use of his library. Sultan did not meet the admissions requirements of the Government School of Art, but in 1941 managed to get in with the help of Suhrawardy, who was on the school's governing body. Under Principal Mukul Chandra Dey the school deemphasized the copying of Old Masters and moved beyond Indian mythological, allegorical, and historical subjects. Students were encouraged to paint contemporary landscapes and portraits expressing original themes from their own life experience.

== Career ==
=== Indian and Pakistani period ===
Sultan left art school after three years, in 1944, and traveled around India. He earned his living by drawing portraits of Allied soldiers encamped along his route. His first exhibition was a solo one in Shimla, India, in 1946. Next, after Partition, came two individual exhibitions in Pakistan: Lahore in 1948 and Karachi in 1949. None of his artworks from this period survived, mainly due to Sultan's own indifference towards preserving his work.

The Institute of International Education (IIE) in New York ran an International Arts Program that brought exceptionally promising foreign artists between the ages of 25 and 35, selected jointly by their country's ministry of education and the IEE, to the United States for a stay of several weeks. The institute provided round-trip transportation and grants for living expenses. The program included visits to museums, a period of creative work or study at a school, consultations with leading American artists, and exhibition of the visitors' work.

Sultan's official selection by the government in Karachi made it possible for him to visit the United States in the early 1950s, (Note: S.M. Sultan and His Paintings and Banglapedia give 1950 as the date of Sultan's visit to the United States. The "Independence Award Listing Details" says it was 1951. According to IEE and Rockefeller Foundation annual reports, the 1951–1952 school year was the first in which Pakistan participated in IEE's International Arts Program.) and exhibit his work at the IEE in New York; at the YMCA in Washington, D.C.; in Boston; at the International House of the University of Chicago; and at Michigan University, Ann Arbor. Later he traveled to England, where he participated in the annual open-air group exhibition at Victoria Embankment Gardens, Hampstead, London.

The following year, while teaching art at a school in Karachi, he came into contact with leading Pakistani artists Abdur Rahman Chughtai and Shakir Ali, with whom he developed a lasting friendship. After a period living and painting in Kashmir, Sultan returned to his native Narail in 1953. He settled down in an abandoned building overlooking the Chitra River, where he lived with an eclectic collection of pets. He lived close to the land and far from the outside art world for the next twenty-three years, developing a reputation as a whimsical recluse and a Bohemian.

SM Sultan. Untitled (1952). Watercolor on card.

Sultan's drawings, such as his self-portrait, are characterized by their economy and compactness. The lines are powerful and fully developed. His early paintings were influenced by the Impressionists. In his oils he employed Van Gogh's impasto technique. His watercolors, predominantly landscapes, are bright and lively.

The themes of his paintings are nature and rural life. S Amjad Ali, writing in 1952 for Pakistan Quarterly, described Sultan as a "landscape artist." Any human figures in his scenes were secondary. In Ali's view Sultan painted from memory in a style that had no definite identity or origins.

=== Bangladeshi period ===
Between Sultan's 1969 individual exhibition at the Khulna Club, Khulna, and the first National Art Exhibition (a group exhibition), in Dhaka, in 1975, a transformation took place in his work.

SM Sultan. Char Dakhal (1976). Bengal Foundation.

Agricultural laborers engaged in everyday activities such as ploughing, planting, threshing, and fishing took center stage on his canvases. The landscape – farmland, rivers, villages – was still present, but as a backdrop. What was distinctive about his figures, such as those in Char Dakhal (1976), was their exaggeratedly muscular physique. In this way he made obvious the inner strength of the sturdy, hard working peasants, the backbone of Bangladesh, something that would have remained hidden in a more realistic depiction.

Sultan did some of his best work in the 1970s and 1980s. In 1976 the Bangladesh Shilpakala Academy put on an individual exhibition of his work. It was his first major exhibition and his first in Dhaka. The next year he was selected as a member of the panel of judges for the Asian Art Biennale in Dhaka. The catalog of his solo exhibition at the German Cultural Center, Dhaka, in 1987, described how he saw his subjects:

These people who lived close to the soil, who bore on their shoulders the burden of civilization did not appear to Sultan to be weak, debilitated, starving creatures who deserved pity and sympathy. Quite the contrary, he saw their bulging muscles, their vigorous torso, their overpowering vitality, their well-rounded buttocks and swelling breasts ready to come to grip with life.

The peasants were heroes to him. He described their place in his art:

The matter of my paintings is about the symbol of energy. The muscle is being used for struggling, struggling with the soil. Power of those arms drives the plough into the soil and grows crops. Labor is the basis and because of that labor of our farmers this land has been surviving over thousand of years.

Sultan's paintings never included urban elements or anything produced by modern technology, which he considered imported. They are modern art in the sense that he broke with the artistic conventions of the past, but they remained figurative art with a narrative. He had little interest in abstract art.

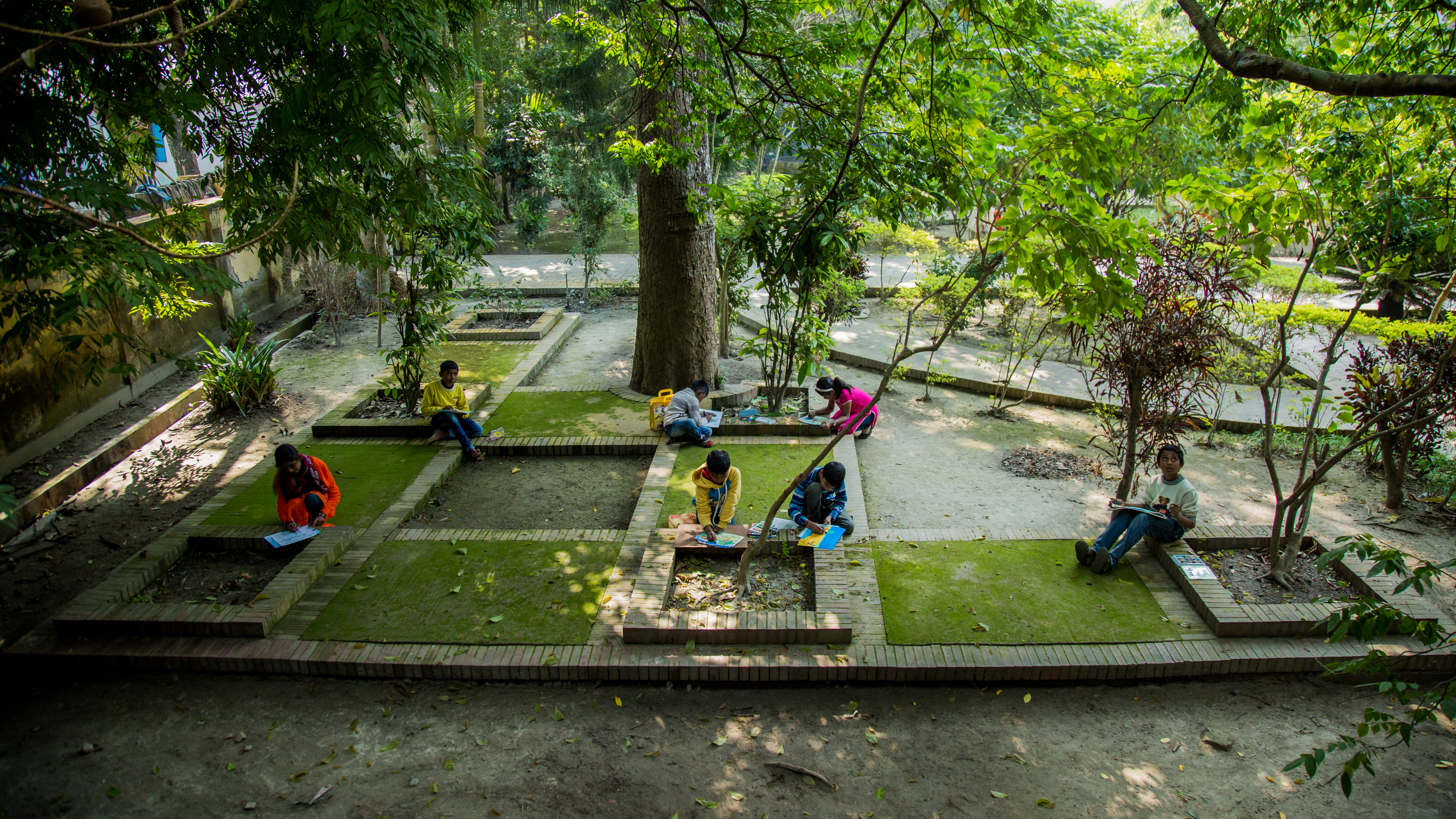
House of SM Sultan

== Legacy ==
Professor Lala Rukh Selim, Chairman of the Department of Sculpture, University of Dhaka, described Sultan as one of the four pioneers of Bangladeshi modernism, along with Zainul Abedin, Safiuddin Ahmed, and Quamrul Hassan.

Sultan received the Ekushey Padak, Bangladesh's highest civilian award for contribution in the field of arts, in 1982; the Bangladesh Charu Shilpi Sangsad Award in 1986; and the Independence Day Award, the highest state award given by the government of Bangladesh, in 1993 for his contribution to fine arts.

Harvesting (1986) is listed by the Bangladesh National Museum as one of its 100 renowned objects.

Sultan established the Kurigram Fine Arts Institute at Narail in 1969 and another art school, now named Charupeeth, in Jessore in 1973.

In 1989, Tareque Masud directed a 54-minute documentary film on Sultan's life, called Adam Surat (The Inner Strength). Masud started filming it in 1982 with the help of the painter, and traveled with him all around Bangladesh. According to Masud, Sultan agreed to cooperate only on the condition that "... rather than being the film's subject, he would act as a catalyst to reveal the film's true protagonist, the Bengali peasant."

In 2005, photographer Nasir Ali Mamun published a book Guru with 68 photographs of Sultan. These were selected from thousands of photographs taken by Mamun in the period from 1978, when he first met with Sultan, until his death.

=== SM Sultan Gold Medal ===
Bangladesh Shilpakala Academy introduced an award 'SM Sultan Gold Medal', named after SM Sultan. The award is given every year to a notable artist, during the festival marking the birth anniversary of SM Sultan. As of January 2020, the award recipients include Farida Zaman, Mustafa Monwar, Qayyum Chowdhury, Rafiqun Nabi, Ferdousi Priyabhashini, Hashem Khan, Abdul Mannan, Kalidas Karmakar, Hamiduzzaman Khan, Samarjit Roy Chowdhury and Murtaja Baseer.
