= Adam Surat =

Adam Surat The Inner Strength
- Poster
- Directed by: Tareque Masud
- Based on: Sheikh Mohammed Sultan (painter)
- Produced by: Tareque Masud
- Starring: SM Sultan
- Edited by: Catherine Masud
- Production company: Audiovision
- Release date: 1989
- Running time: 54 minutes
- Country: Bangladesh
- Languages: Bengali, English

Adam Surat (Bengali: আদম সুরতThe Inner Strength) is a 1989 Bangladeshi documentary film about the Bangladeshi painter Sheikh Mohammed Sultan, directed and produced by Tareque Masud.

== Synopsis ==
Adam Surat is the directional debut film of Masud. It is a documentary about Bangladeshi painter Sheikh Mohammed Sultan (well known as "SM Sultan"). Masud started the film in 1982 and completed it seven years later. By that time, he had met and married the Chicago-born Catherine Shapere (well known as Catherine Masud), with whom he formed a close working relationship until his death.

== Digitized ==
The 54 minute documentary film was taken in 16 mm film. The film had been converted into the digital format at a studio in New York City. The film would soon be released all over Bangladesh except Dhaka.
