= Shonar Beri =

- Bengali: সোনার বেড়ি
- Directed by: Tareque Masud
- Written by: Tareque Masud
- Screenplay by: Tareque Masud
- Story by: Tareque Masud
- Production company: Documentum
- Release date: 1987
- Running time: 25 mins
- Country: Bangladesh
- Language: Bengali

Shonar Beri (Bengali: সোনার বেড়ি; also known in English as Chains of Gold) is a 1987 Bengali documentary film. Written and directed by Tareque Masud, the film was his directorial debut. The film was also the first video documentary and was an early attempt at dealing with gender issues in Bangladesh.
