= Aly Zaker =

Bangladeshi actor (1944–2020)

- আলী যাকের
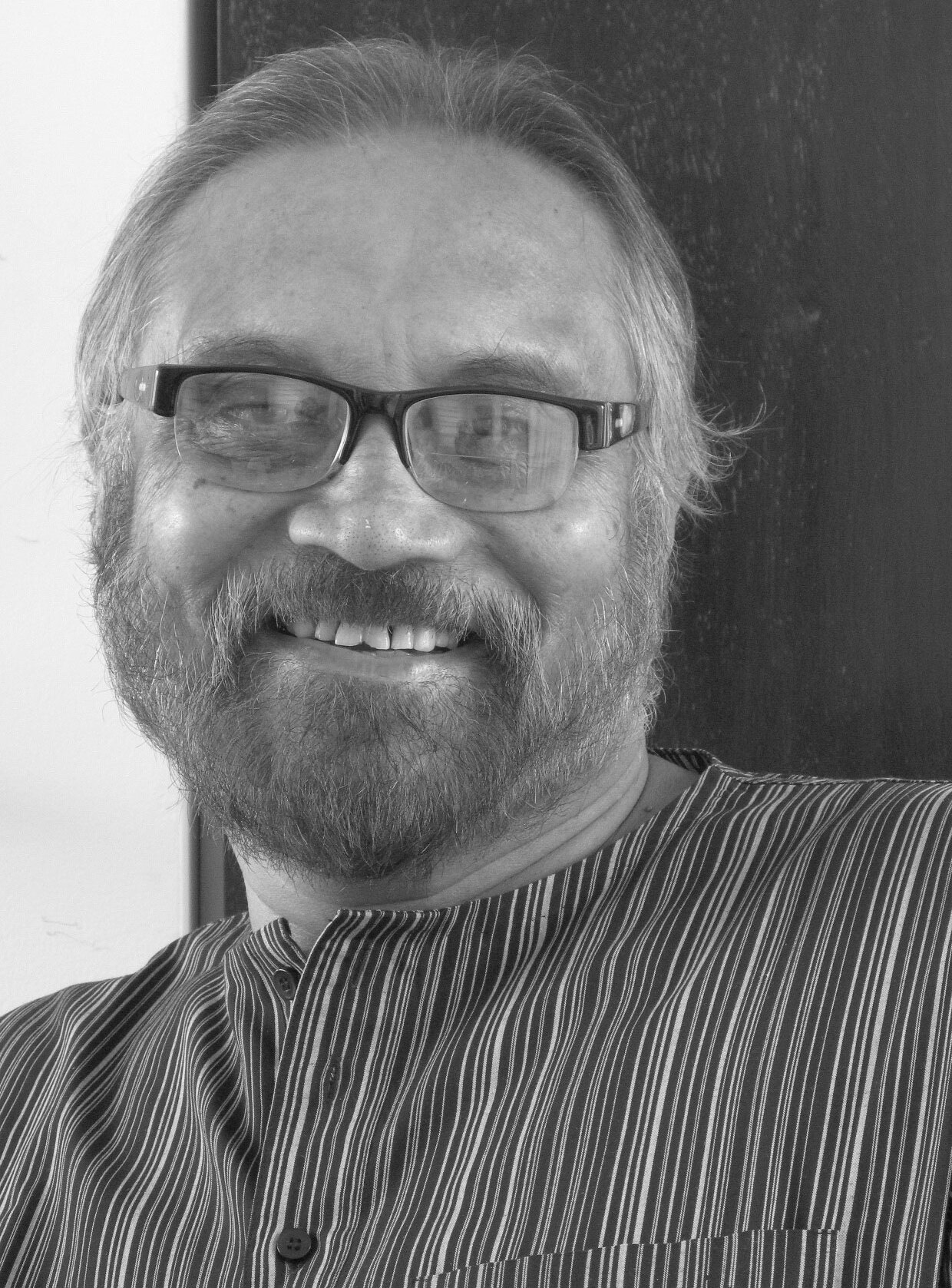
- Born: 6 November 1944; Village Ratanpur of Nabinagar Upazila, Brahmanbaria District, Bengal Presidency, British India
- Died: 27 November 2020 (aged 76); United Hospital, Dhaka, Bangladesh
- Education: University of Dhaka
- Occupations: Actor, director, businessman
- Spouse: Sara Zaker
- Children: Iresh Zaker; Sriya Sharbojoya
- Parents: Muhammad Taher; Rezia Taher
- Website: http://alyzaker.love

Aly Zaker (6 November 1944 – 27 November 2020) was a Bangladeshi actor, businessman, director and writer. He was the owner of Asiatic Marketing Communications Limited (Asiatic 3 Sixty).

Zaker served as a freedom fighter during the 1971 Bangladesh Liberation War. He was one of the trustees of Liberation War Museum in Dhaka.

In 1999 Zaker was awarded the prestigious Ekushey Padak award by the Government of Bangladesh, which is the second highest civilian award in Bangladesh.

Aly Zaker, who had cancer, died at Dhaka's United Hospital at 6:45am on 27 November 2020. He was being treated for COVID-19.

== Early life and education ==
Zaker was born on 6 November 1944 to a Bengali family in Ratanpur, Nabinagar (now in Brahmanbaria District, Bangladesh). Among four siblings, he was the third of his parents – Muhammad Taher and Rezia Taher. Muhammad Taher was a high ranked government official (District Magistrate).

He experienced the diversity of life living in different places since his early childhood as his father was in a transferable government job. He spent his early childhood in Kushtia and Madaripur. The family later moved to Khulna and lived there for a couple of years until they moved to Dhaka. He completed his matriculation from the St. Gregory's High School in 1960, and proceeded to study at the Notre Dame College. He graduated with a Bachelor of Arts in social science from the University of Dacca.

== Personal life ==
Zaker was married to Sara Zaker who is also a media personality, entrepreneur, and social activist. Together they had two children – Iresh Zaker and Sriya Sharbojoya. Both Iresh and Sriya are working in Asiatic Marketing Communications Limited as executive director and brand communication manager respectively. While Sara Zaker is the deputy managing director of the company.

== Professional life ==
=== Acting ===
Zaker was famed for his theatre acting, with his career spanning many decades. He was founding member of the theatre group, Nagorik where he worked alongside his wife Sara Zaker and the celebrated actor and politician Asaduzzaman Noor since the 1970s.

In 2018 Zakar played the leading role in a Bangla adaptation of Bertolt Brecht's 1943 play The Life of Galileo. Zakar played the role of the 17th Century polymath, Galileo Galilei, alongside Asaduzzaman Noor, who played a number of supporting roles. The play ran for a limited number of performances in Dhaka's Bailey Road.

=== Business ===
Zaker was the group chairman of Asiatic 3Sixty, an advertising agency in Bangladesh. It includes Asiatic Marketing Communications Ltd, Talkingpoint, MEC (media agency), Maxus, Asiatic Mindshare, ForthoughtPR, Dhoni Chitra Ltd, 20 Miles, Nayantara Communications, Asiatic Events Ltd, Moitree Printers Ltd., MRC-Mode Ltd.

== Work ==
Television drama

- Pathar Shomoy
- Bohubrihi
- Aaj Robibaar
- Nitu Tomaye Bhalobasi
- Ekdin Hothat
- Nokkhotrer Raat (Guest Appearance)

Theatre

- Dewan Gazir Kissa
- Acholayatan
- Chhayanaut
- Kanthal Bagan (Cherry Orchard)

Films

- Agami (1984)
- Nodir Naam Modhumoti (1996)
- "Brishtee"
- Rabeya (2008)

== Awards ==
- Ekushey Padak (1999)
- Selim Al-Deen Padak (2017)
- Shaheed Altaf Mahmud Padak (2017)
- Meril Prothom Alo Awards (2018)
