= Sara Zaker =

Bangladeshi actor, director, businesswoman, and social activist

- সারা যাকের
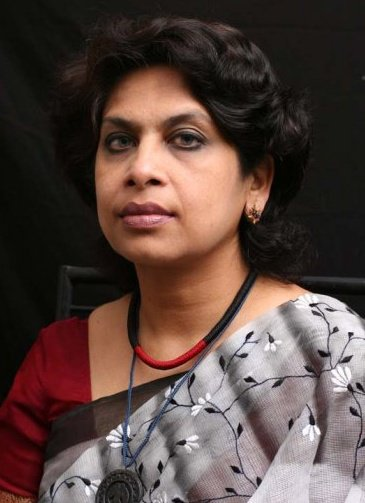
- Born: Sara Amin; 21 October
- Education: University of Dhaka (MA)
- Occupations: Actor, director, producer, entrepreneur, activist
- Spouse: Aly Zaker (m. 1975; died 2020)
- Children: 2, including Iresh Zaker
- Awards: Full list

Sara Zaker née Amin is a Bangladeshi theatre and television actor, director, business entrepreneur, and social activist. She was awarded Ekushey Padak by the government of Bangladesh in 2017.

== Early life and education ==
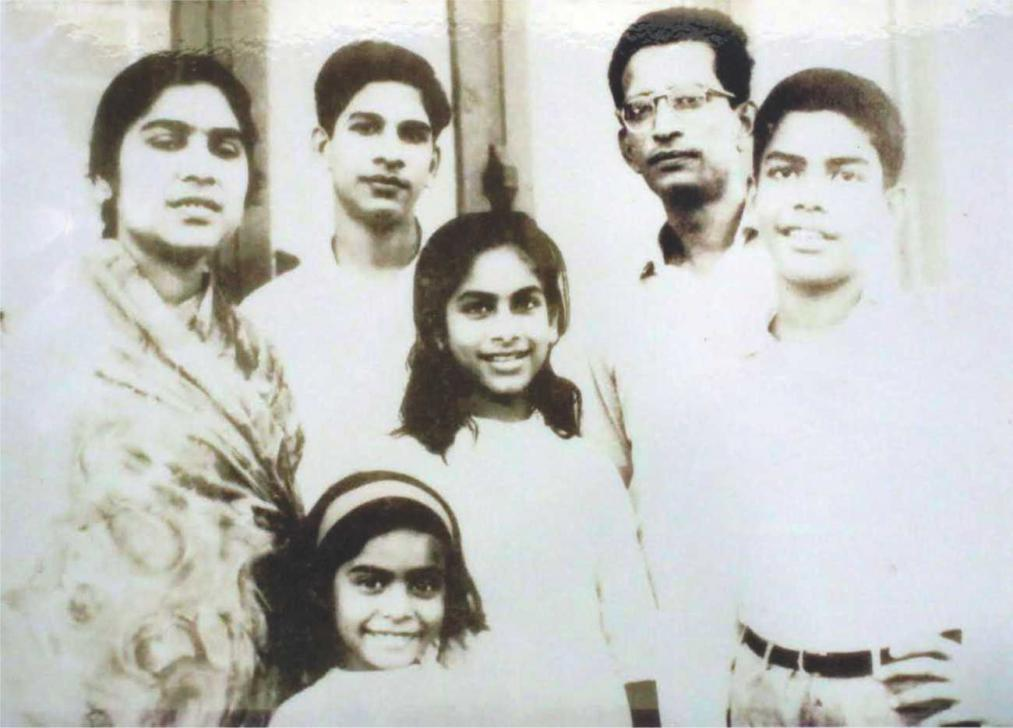
Zaker (centre) with her family in Dhanmondi, Dhaka (1965)

Sara Amin was born in Abbottabad in the then North-West Frontier Province, Dominion of Pakistan. She was nicknamed Chixie. She was the third of four children of Major Salauddin Mohammad Amin, a Pakistan Army officer and Alia Amin, a former school teacher of Viqarunnisa Noon School. The family moved to Dhaka in 1962 after Salauddin left the army. They lived in a newly built house in Dhanmondi, Dhaka for nine months in 1965 before moving to Eskaton Garden. Sara went to "Ragrupa", a dance school in Dhanmondi. The eldest son, Chinku, was killed during the Bangladesh Liberation War in 1971.

Sara was a student of Viqarunnisa Noon School and Holy Cross College, Dhaka. She enrolled into the University of Dhaka to study biochemistry but later graduated with bachelors and masters in English literature. She then went to London for a directorial course.

== Career ==
=== Actress ===
Sara Zaker joined Nagorik Natya Sampraday, a theater troupe, just after finishing secondary school in 1972. Her first production with the troupe, "Baki Itihash" premiered in February 1973. She went on to perform in Bidogdho Romonikul, Nishiddho Polli, Shot Manusher Khoje (1976), Dewan Gazi'r Kissa and "Naam-Gotroheen: Manto'r Meyera" (2014).

=== Entrepreneur ===
Zaker's business career began in 1995 in the field of market research. She is working as the project head of Nayantara Communications since its inception in 2004. Nayantara is the co-producer of Sesame Workshop New York in producing Sisimpur, the Bengali edition of the Sesame Street. She is the managing director of Asiatic 360, director of Asiatic Events Marketing Limited, and the managing director of Ddhoni Chitra Ltd.

=== Activist ===
- Founder member of the Board of Trustees of Liberation War Museum of Bangladesh.

== Personal life ==
Sara married actor Aly Zaker (d. 2020) in 1975. Their son, Iresh Zaker, is an actor and daughter, Sriya Sharbojaya, worked at a sister concern of Asiatic 360 and as a radio personality of Radio ABC and Radio Shadhin.

As of 2021, Sara's brother, Alim Amin Pincho, is working as a professor and her sister, Sajeda Amin Pixie, as a demographer, both residents of the United States.

== Works ==
Serial dramas

- Nokkhtrer Raat
- Ayomoy

Films

- Emiler Goenda Bahini (1980)
- Nodir Naam Modhumoti (1996)
- Ontarjatra (2006)

Produced

- Chuye Dile Mon (2015)

Voice

- The World According to Sesame Street (2006)

== Awards ==
- Bishishtho Nattojon – Lokonattya Gosthi Sommanona (2014)
- Badruddin Hossain Memorial Award (2016)
- Ekushey Padak (2017)
- Munier Choudhury Award (2020)
- ATN Women in Excellence Award (2023)
