= Nurul Islam Bablu =

Bangladeshi actor

- নুরুল ইসলাম বাবলু
- Born: September 15, 1996
- Occupation: Actor
- Years active: 2002
- Notable work: Matir Moina (2002)

Nurul Islam Bablu popularly known as Nurul Haque, is a Bangladeshi actor, known for his acting debut in the film Matir Moina, directed by Tareque Masud, which became Bangladesh's first film to compete for the Academy Award for Best Foreign Language Film in 2002. For this film he won a National Film Awards in Best Child Artist category in 2002.

== Career ==
Bablu got his acting breakthrough in Tareque Masud's film Matir Moina in 2002.

== Filmography ==
Year	Title	Role	Notes
2002	Matir Moina	Anu	

== Awards and nominations ==
Year	Award	Category	Film	Result
2002	Bangladesh National Film Awards	Best Child Artist	Matir Moina	Won
