= List of defamation of religion cases under section 57 in Bangladesh =

According to the 15(Ga), 15 (Gha) and 27 paragraphs of constitution of Bangladesh, everyone is equal in law and state is bound to provide equal rights to citizens of Bangladesh without considering their religion or caste. According to 39–1, 39–2 (Ka), (Kha), state provide freedom of speech to every citizen. ICT 57 act also exists in the same constitution, which is unclear and had criticism from the beginning. However, Awamileague government never seemed interested in dismissing this rule rather than put effort of modifying or bringing correction in the act. Though, so far barely any correction visible from the first version of the act. Misuse of this act is getting popular with time. Many people had been arrested and many case has been filed according this act. Different time, claiming blasphemy religion minority were attacked. According to constitution, state is committed to make sure the safety of its citizen but most often Bangladesh government failed to maintain that. Moreover, there's a claim that even state's forces were involved in kidnapping civil citizen. Here's the list of similar incidents happened on the year of 2017:

== Complains on blasphemy ==
1. On 27 January 2017 two Ansar member were arrested by police for using invective or abusing language on religion.
2. A person named Tapas Kar was accused to use abusive language against Islam. Police arrested him on 31 March according to the ICT 57 act.
3. On 22 April 2017 leaders of Hefazot E Islam, Narayanganj area demanded to arrest Rabby claiming his speech were blasphemous.
4. Against a reporter of Daily Janakantha, Firoj Mannan, there was an accusation of blasphemy against Buddhist religion. People made a protest human chain at Roangchori.
5. Police arrested a young man on 11 May 2017 for posting indecent materials about Islam religion on social network. Local Muslims had a protests against him on the same day.
6. Police arrested a person named Papon Bisshas from Bagerhat. He was accused to comparing mosque and temple with brothel.
7. Student of Jahangirnagar University, Pallab Ahmed was accused to post indecent statement against Mohammad on his social media account. Although he withdrew his statement but he was arrested on 8 June.
8. Rakesh Roy, Chief Editor of Hinduism-Buddhist-Christian United Council was arrested by Police for making invective against Islam and Mohammed.
9. In Rangamati, on 7 June 2017, a group of religious people demanded death sentence of Shaon biSshas and Chaina Patowari for abusing Islam religion through there Facebook post.
10. Student of Chittagong University, Nayan Mojumder was beaten for supporting Sultana Kamal's speech on social media. He was accused to support blasphemy against Islam. Two Maolana, Muslim leader asked to attack his home. Although Nayan Majumder apologized for his support still he was beaten by a group of angry young people.
11. Hajiganj Thana Police arrested a youth for using abusive words about Namaz on his personal social media account.
12. Police arrested a person named Abdullah Al Mamun accusing to abuse Quran on 1 August 2017.
13. On 28 August, Hundreds Muslim protested in road and demanded death sentence of a person named Al Amin accusing blasphemy against Islam and Muhammed.
14. Proctor of Noakhali Science and Technology University was accused to abuse religion on 30 August 2017
15. A school boy Shubhroto Modok was accused to use abusive word about reciting Quran. He was arrested by police according to ACT 57 (2) at midnight.
16. police arrested Bilas Chandra Paul on 4 October for inciting violence by insulting a mosque during a march.
17. On 4 October 2017, a teacher of Indurkani School had to apologize in front of people for using invective against Quran
18. Muslims of Patenga area had a protest against a group named Ahle Sunnat for abusing Quran on 20 October 2017
19. Shyamol Chandra Roy was arrested from Lalmonirhat for sharing a Facebook post on 20 October 2017.
20. A young person was arrested on 21 October for abusing religion.
21. A village doctor was accused to use insult Imam Azam Abu Hanif on 28 October. Local people beat him up and sent him to police later.রে
22. Although, Doyal Bari's family claimed he is mentally unstable however he was also arrested for abusing religion on 31 October.2017. He used invective against religion on his speech at an Islamic program.
23. On 31 October a school teacher from Hatia was accused to use abusive word against religion on his social media account. He claimed, it was someone else but not him.
24. A service holder of Sonali Bank, Modhusudon Haoladar was accused to abusive words about Islam, Hajj and Tablig Jamat on 7 November. The case is still under investigation. However, the bank already sent him legal notice and transferred into another branch.
25. Mobile phone of school teacher Atikur Rahman, from Faridpur was seized on 10 November for posting invective against Hinduism on social media.

== Violence ==
1. On 16 March, Abul Bashar from Char Matua Union was accused of using invective against Mohammad. Local people set fire to his house, damaging it.
2. On 2 November 2017, a person named Bishnumalo was accused to posting abusing photo of Quran. More than 200 local people destroyed his computer servicing shop at morning and later they also attacked at his home. Police arrested Bishnumalo instead on Act 57 and he claimed it was not him but someone else posted that invective against Quran. Police informed an investigation will take place on his activity.
3. On 10 November 2017, a total of 15 houses of eight Hindu families were set on fire and destroyed. Police tried to stop this destruction and as a result 1 person died and around 30 people were hurt, including police. The incident was triggered by a Facebook post by Tito Roy that was derogatory of Mohammad. Although Tito Roy does not live in that village anymore, his mother is a resident of that village. According to local police, more than 10,000 people from 8 different village gathered on this destructive activity. However, later the protesters claimed local Hindus set fire on their own house.
