= Juddho Joy =

2007 sculpture made by Ejaj-e-Kabir

Coordinates: 23.4767312°N 91.1360723°E

- যুদ্ধ জয় (Bengali)
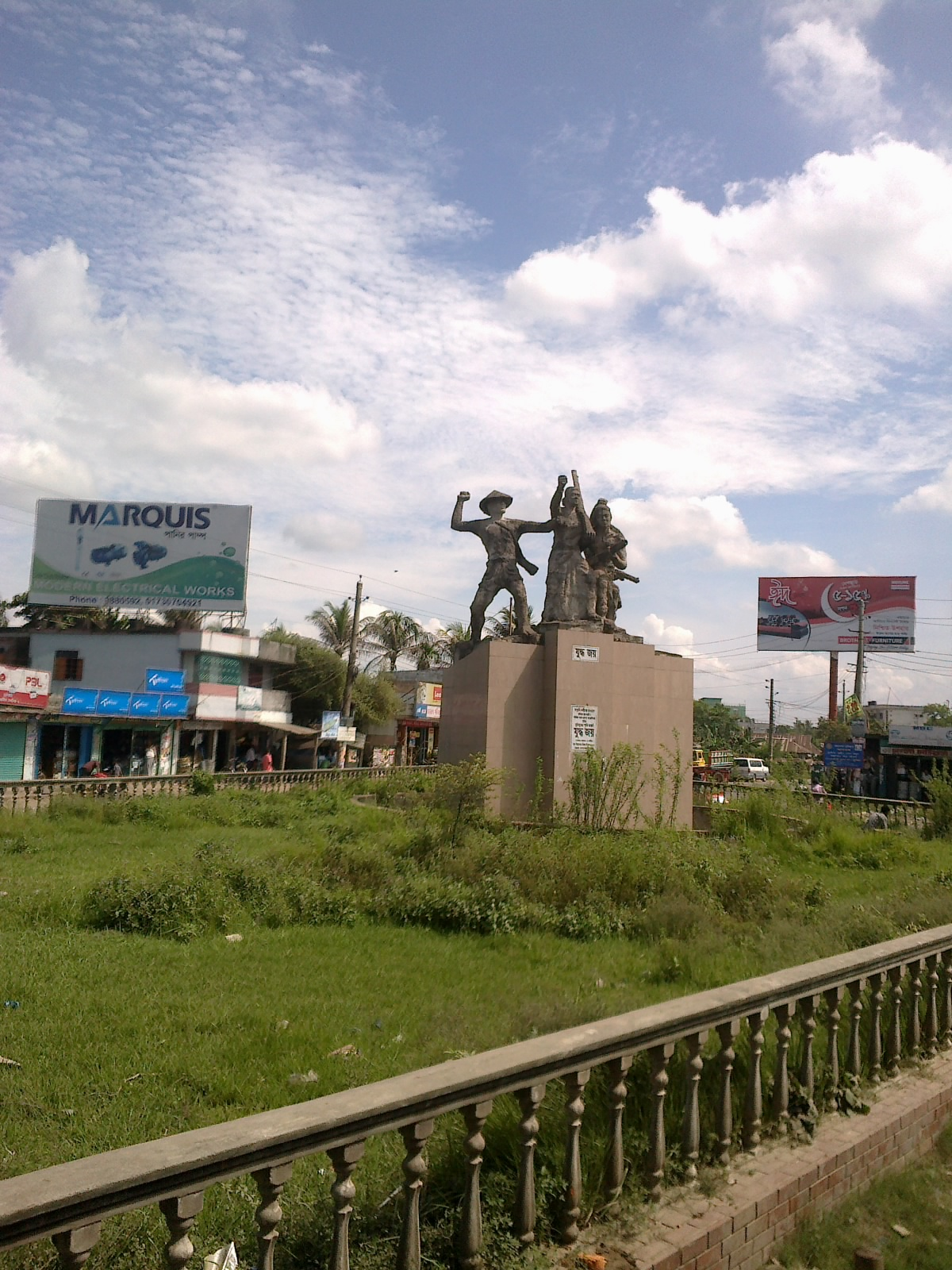
- Artist: Ejaj-e-Kabir
- Completion date: 16 December 2007
- Subject: Bangladesh Liberation War
- Location: Alekhar Char, Cumilla
- Owner: Cumilla City Corporation

Juddho Joy (Bengali: যুদ্ধ জয়, lit. 'Victory in the war') is a commemorative sculpture of the Bangladesh Liberation War. The sculpture of the freedom fighters is installed at Alekharchar, at the entrance of Cumilla city, from the Dhaka-Chattogram highway. It was officially unveiled on 16 December 2007.

Designed by Ejaz-e-Kabir, the sculpture was built with financial support from the Shafiul Group and is maintained by the Cumilla City Corporation. It is recognized as one of the main locations for celebrating Victory Day in Cumilla.

== Description ==
The sculpture captures the moment of four freedom fighters, including a woman, stepping forward with determination on a raised platform. The female fighter is moving forward with her hand raised, the fighter on the right side of her is ready with a grenade in hand, and the other two freedom fighters are alert with weapons in hand.
