= Saidur Rahman Boyati =

Bangladeshi folk singer

- সাইদুর রহমান বয়াতি
- Born: 1931 (age 94–95); Manikganj District, Bengal Presidency, British India
- Occupation: Folk singer

Saidur Rahman Boyati (born 1931) is a Bangladesh folk singer of Baul genre. He was awarded Shilpakala Padak in 2013 and Bangladesh National Film Award for Best Male Playback Singer in 1995.

== Background and career ==
Boyati started his education at Paschim Hasli Primary School in Manikganj. In 1959, he failed the matriculation examination and did not study afterward.

During the war of liberation in 1971, Boyati used to write various songs and poems to give courage to his comrades.

== Personal life ==
Rahman married Saleha Begum in 1986. They had three sons and a daughter. Their eldest son Abul Bashar Abbasi is also a musician. He sings on radio and television.
