= Nodir Naam Modhumoti =

- DVD cover
- নদীর নাম মধুমতী
- Directed by: Tanvir Mokammel
- Written by: Tanvir Mokammel
- Produced by: KINO-EYE FILMS
- Starring: Tauquir Ahmed; Abul Khair; Aly Zaker; Raisul Islam Asad; Sara Zaker; Afsana Mimi
- Cinematography: Anwar Hossain
- Edited by: Mahadeb Shi
- Music by: Syed Shabab Ali Arzoo
- Release date: 20 December 1996
- Running time: 130 minutes
- Country: Bangladesh
- Language: Bengali

Nodir Naam Modhumoti (translated as The River Named Modhumoti) is a 1996 Bangladeshi Bengali language film directed by Tanvir Mokammel. The film, produced and distributed by Kino-Eye Films, stars a notable cast with Tauquir Ahmed, Aly Zaker, Raisul Islam Asad, Sara Zaker, and Afsana Mimi in prominent etc. It won 20th Bangladesh National Film Awards for the Best Story, Best Dialogue and Best Male Playback Singer. It is debut film of the actor Gazi Rakayet.

== Background ==
The film was banned by the Censor Board in 1994 citing the reason "anti-nationalist". Mokammel appealed this ban to the Bangladesh Supreme Court, and then to the High Court. The film was released later in 1996.

== Plot ==
In a village by the banks of the Madhumati River, Motaleb Molla, a local landlord and influential Muslim leader, resides. After the death of his elder brother, Motaleb marries his brother's widow, who already had a son named Bacchu. Bacchu, influenced by the village teacher, Amulya Chakraborty, works towards establishing a school in the village. Assisting him in this endeavor is Akhtar, an older friend with whom Bacchu shares a close bond. Together, they often visit Amulya's house to discuss various matters. Amulya's daughter, Shanti, who is a widow, lives with her father.

During the 1971 Bangladesh Liberation War, Motaleb sides with the Pakistani military, while Bacchu, inspired by Sheikh Mujibur Rahman's speech on the radio, joins the guerrilla forces. Bacchu is horrified by the atrocities committed by the Pakistani army, but he struggles with his role as he is not given significant responsibilities due to his father's position as the chairman of the Peace Committee. Meanwhile, Motaleb's followers murder Amulya Chakraborty and force his daughter Shanti into marrying Motaleb.

The guerrillas decide to impose the death penalty on the collaborators. However, the commander hesitates to make a decision regarding Motaleb, as he is Bacchu's father. One day, Bacchu takes matters into his own hands. Determined to complete his mission, he crosses the Madhumati River with a rifle in hand, prepared to face the consequences.

== Cast ==
- Tauquir Ahmed
- Aly Zaker
- Raisul Islam Asad
- Sara Zaker
- Afsana Mimi
- Abul Khair
- Gazi Rakayet
- Shomu Chowdhury

== Soundtrack ==
The music for the film was composed by Syed Shabab Ali Arju, with lyrics penned by Abu Zafar Shamsuddin. The songs were performed by Farida Parveen and Saidur Rahman Boyati.

== Awards ==
Award Title	Category	Awardee	Result
1996 National Film Awards	Best Story	Tanvir Mokammel	Won
1996 National Film Awards	Best Dialogue	Tanvir Mokammel	Won
1996 National Film Awards	Best Male Playback Singer	Saidur Rahman Boyati	Won
