= Muktir Gaan =

- Poster of Muktir Gaan
- Directed by: Tareque Masud; Catherine Masud
- Produced by: Tareque Masud
- Cinematography: Lear Levin
- Edited by: Catherine Masud
- Music by: Heamel Shaha
- Production company: Audiovision
- Release date: 1 December 1995
- Running time: 80 minutes
- Country: Bangladesh
- Language: Bengali

Muktir Gaan (Bengali: মুক্তির গান; The Song of Freedom) is a 1995 Bangladeshi documentary film by Tareque Masud and his wife Catherine Masud. It explores the impact of cultural identity on the Bangladesh Liberation War in 1971, where music and songs provided a source of inspiration to the freedom fighters and a spiritual bond for the emerging nation.

== Background ==
During the Liberation War in 1971, a cultural troupe, named Bangladesh Mukti Sangrami Shilpi Sangstha used to travel to refugee camps and different areas in Mukta Anchal, perform patriotic songs, arrange puppet shows and stage dramas to inspire the freedom fighters and people with the spirit of war. Muktir Gaan, 25 years in the making. Tareque and Catherine used original footage by American filmmaker Lear Levin, as well as other archival footage from the UK and India.

== Crew ==
- Tareque Masud, director, co-producer
- Catherine Masud, co-producer, editor
- Lear Levin, Cinematography

== Synopsis ==
In 1971 the people of East Pakistan (now Bangladesh) waged a war of liberation against West Pakistan, which ended in December 1971 with the foundation of the country of Bangladesh. The film Muktir Gaan is a special and rare archive of footage of this war. Firstly the footage taken by American filmmaker Lear Levin shot of a group of young musicians and actors who at the time travelled through the country with battle songs and political puppet shows. The film follows the group not only during their performances for refugees and guerillas but also during their travels, which has produced many melancholy pictures. Levin's material is available for the first time thanks to two filmmakers from Bangladesh who, being discontent with the present regime, wanted to remind the Bengal people of the initial motives of the war of liberation: freedom and democracy. The film was screened in Bangladesh where it was a resounding success.

== Music ==
The songs in Muktir Gaan have been sung by various singers of the country. The film also features Brig Gen (retired) Giasuddin Chowdhury, Aminul Haque Badshah and other nameless freedom fighters who fought for liberation of the country.

- Bipul Bhattacharjee
- Debobroto Chowdhury
- Dulal Chandrashil
- Laila Khan
- Lata Chowdhury
- Lubna Marium
- Mahmudur Rahman Benu
- Shaheen Samad
- Sharmin Murshid
- Swapan Chowdhury
- Ziauddin Tariq Ali

== See also ==
- Artistic depictions of Bangladesh Liberation War
- Independent films of Bangladesh
