= Matir Moina =

2002 Bengali film

- Film poster
- Bengali: মাটির ময়না
- Directed by: Tareque Masud
- Written by: Tareque Masud
- Screenplay by: Tareque Masud; Catherine Masud
- Story by: Tareque Masud
- Produced by: Catherine Masud
- Starring: Nurul Islam Bablu; Jayanta Chattopadhyay; Rokeya Prachy; Masud Ali Khan; Soaeb Islam; Lameesa R. Reemjheem
- Cinematography: Sudheer Palsane
- Edited by: Catherine Masud
- Music by: Moushumi Bhowmik
- Production companies: MK2 Diffusion; Audiovision
- Distributed by: MK2 Diffusion; Milestone Film & Video; Audiovision; ICA Projects
- Release dates: 15 May 2002 (Cannes Film Festival); 30 April 2004 (North America)
- Running time: 98 minutes
- Country: Bangladesh
- Language: Bengali
- Budget: $300,000
- Box office: est. US$46,852

Matir Moina (Bengali: মাটির ময়না; also known in English as The Clay Bird) is a 2002 Bengali war-drama film written and directed by Tareque Masud. It was his debut feature film. Based on Tareque's story the screenplay was co-written by Tareque and Catherine Masud. In the film, Tareque's childhood experience is revealed against the backdrop of 1969 Mass uprising in East Pakistan on the eve of Bangladesh Liberation War. The film stars Nurul Islam Bablu, Russell Farazi, Jayanta Chattopadhyay, Rokeya Prachy, Soaeb Islam and Lameesa R. Reemjheem in the lead role. It is considered one of the best Bangladeshi films of 21st century.

The film deals with its historical references during the independence of Bangladesh. It portrays the experiences of a young protagonist, his family, his teachers and his life at the madrasah. Production began with initial funding from the French government. The film was officially screened on 15 May 2002 at the 55th Cannes Film Festival. Produced by Catherine Masud, the film grossed about US$48,752 at the box office after its release.

The film was initially banned in Bangladesh. After the expulsion order was revoked, VCD and DVD version of the film were released on 17 April 2005 by Laser Vision. In 2002, as the first Bangladeshi film, it won the FIPRESCI Prize in section Directors' Fortnight at the Cannes Film Festival. In 2004, the film won the National Film Awards for Best Child Artist and Best Screenplay. The film also won various domestic and international awards, including awards in five categories at the 24th Bachsas Awards. It was Bangladesh's first submission for Best Foreign Language Film category at the 75th Academy Awards in 2002.

== Plot ==
The film is set in the late 1960s, during the unrest period in East Pakistan leading up to the Bangladesh War of Liberation. The story is of a small village family which comes to grip with their culture, faith, tradition, and the brutal political changes. The autobiographical film, set against the backdrop of the director's childhood, is based on the life story which is pictured by a teenage character named Anu (Nurul Islam Bablu). He lives with his fundamentalist-Muslim father, Kazi (Jayanta Chattopadhyay), who practices homoeopathic medicines. His mother, Ayesha (Rokeya Prachy) was once a spirited girl, but after her marriage, she becomes sullen in subservience to her fundamentalist husband. Anu has a little sister named Asma. Kazi's younger brother Milon is involved in local politics protesting against Pakistan's military rule and follows Left-wing politics. Despite Kazi's dislike, Milon took Anu to see Hindu festivals and the Canoe sprint. The film depicts the culture of secular Bengal, including folk-songs, Puthi recitation, Chaitra Sankranti or Charak Puja, embroidery, rural fairs, Bahas etc.

Finally, Kazi sent Anu to a madrasa (Islamic school) because of his religious beliefs. At the madrasa, Anu met and befriended Rokon (Russell Farazi), an outcast student, who invites him to play catch with an imaginary ball. Rokon's role is different from other students. After all, Anu tried to adjust to life away from home. Suddenly his younger sister Asma falls ill and dies because of Kazi's refusal to use modern medicines. On the other hand, at the madrasa Rokon is an eccentric misfit and forced by the headmaster to undergo an exorcism by ducking in the freezing pond to cure himself of Jinn.

As the political upheaval reaches a critical stage, internal crises begin to occur in Anu's family. As political divisions intensified, moderate and extremist ideologies developed in Anu's madrasa and growing divisions arose. The same picture of division is seen in Anu's family and her independent mother Ayesha. Kazi still believes in the religious unity of Pakistan, in the face of cruel, contradictory events. A shattering political development then changes their town, their life, and the inner dynamics of the family, including the patriarch's role. The film, which focuses on religious liberalism, cultural diversity, and the incomprehensibility of Islam, has universal relevance in a troubled world.

== Cast ==
- Nurul Islam Bablu as Anu
- Russell Farazi as Jonas Ebadat, Anu's friend
- Jayanta Chattopadhyay as Kazi, Anu's father
- Rokeya Prachy as Ayesha Bibi, Anu's mother
- Soaeb Islam as Milon, Anu's uncle
- Lameesa R. Reemjheem as Asma, Anu's sister
- Moin Ahmed as Ibrahim, Madrasa teacher
- Md. Moslemuddin as Bakiullah headmaster
- Abdul Karim as Halim Mia
- Shah Alom Dewan as Karim boatman
- Golam Mahmud as Shaheen, Milon's friend
- Pradip Mittra Mithun as Uttam, Milon's friend
- Auyon Chowdhury as 3rd Friend
- Masud Ali Khan as Khan Bahadur
- Amena Khatun as Taser's Mother
- Manjila Begum as Female singer-Night concert
- Aynal Mia as Male singer-Day Concert
- Nasima Aktar as Female Singer-Day Concert
- Abdul Malek as Night Concert Accompanist
- Gurudhan as Night Concert Accompanist
- Nuru Mia Chisty as Night Concert Accompanist
- Shafique as Day Concert Accompanist
- Majibur Rahman as Day Concert Accompanist
- Iman Ali Sarkar as Day Concert Accompanist
- Abdul Kadir as Day Concert Accompanist
- Ibrahim Boyati as Ferry Boat Singer
- Gulam Rabbani
- Kazi Tamanna
- Shiuly Ahmed
- Naznin Sultana
- Mohiuddin Sarkar
- Nayaran Banik
- Lokman
- Pulak

Other Madrasa Students

- Kamrul
- Jashim 1
- Jashim 2
- Kashem
- Akhter
- Sohel
- Shamim
- Apu
- Imran
- Bahadur
- Hasan
- Kamal
- Yahia
- Rasel
- Omar Faruk Uzzal
- Sajib
- Tofajjal
- Taher
- Moktar
- Khokon
- Liton
- Jahangir

== Pre-production ==
"The film is a reflection of my life. The protagonist in the film is what I have been. I was sent to a Madrasa where I studied till the age of 15 and the film just portrays what I experienced."
— Tareque Masud

For many years, Tareque and Catherine Masud were planning to make a feature based on Tareque's childhood experience at the madrasa (Islamic school) during the late 1960s in the East Pakistan (now Bangladesh). That was a turbulent period in the history of Bangladesh. Before liberation its eastern wing Islamic State of Pakistan was divided into a strong secular and democratic movement and a pro-Islamic military junta bent on stifling dissent and reform which leads to 1969 Mass uprising in East Pakistan. The film contents reference to historical events. In this film, Masud wanted to tell his autobiographical story through the childish vision. In May 2000, based on the quality of the screenplay they received a grant from the French Ministry of Culture and Communication and the Ministry of Europe and Foreign Affairs Fonds Sud (South Fund) for the production of films. This grant also covered the film stock, 35 mm camera equipment and necessary laboratory facilities. Later, Paris-based production and distribution company Mk2, was contracted to co-produce and distribute the film internationally. Multiple producers co-produced the film with Catherine.

== Production ==
At the end of 2000, a year and a half of film production began in Bhanga, Faridpur. Masood and Catherine invested almost their entire savings in projects involving ambitious massive seasonal shooting and timing publication design. The characters made up entirely of non-professional actors, including street children, Madrasa students-teachers, rural folk musicians and villagers. As the first Bangladeshi feature, Matir Moina using the live sound recording to capture spontaneous performances and live ambience. The film was also shot on actual locations in rural settings and small towns in Dhamrai and Faridpur, during all winter, monsoon and spring seasons. It was completed in early 2002.

== Post-production ==
=== Music and soundtrack ===
All tracks are written by A.T. Masud.

No.	Title	Music	Performer(s)	Length
1.	"Pakhita Bondi Aachhe" (The Bird is Trapped in the Body's Cage)	Traditional	Momtaz	3:38
2.	"Puthi Recitation" (Recitation)		Shah Alam Dewan
3.	"Shere Khoda Ali Sabe" (The Ballad of Fatema)		Ibrahim Boyati
4.	"Jodi Bheste Jaite" (If You Wish to Go to Heaven)		Aynal Mia, Momtaz	4:22

== Release ==
=== Screening ===
As the first Bangladeshi feature film, it was initially screened on 15 May 2002 at the 55th Cannes Film Festival in Directors' Fortnight section. In addition to its commercial release in Europe and Americas, the film was screened at multiple festivals in later years. In August 2002, the film was screened at the Edinburgh International Film Festival and the Montreal World Film Festival in Canada. In the same year on 9 October it was screened at the Sitges Film Festival in Spain, and the Cairo International Film Festival in Egypt.

On 11 January 2003, the film was screened at the Palm Springs International Film Festival in the United States. In the same year on 9 February, it was screened at the Toronto International Film Festival. On 5 April 2003, the film was selected at the New Directors/New Film Festival, jointly organized by the Film Society of Lincoln Center in New York City and the Museum of Modern Art. It was screened on 17 December at the 8th International Film Festival of Kerala in India. On 15 February 2004, the film was screened at the Dublin International Film Festival in Ireland. A press screening was held on 24 March. In 2015, Matir Moina was screened at Bangladesh Shilpakala Academy as the inaugural film at the Bangladesh Film Festival.

=== Commercial release ===
Outside its home country, the film was initially released in theatres in France. Due to its ban, the film was not initially screened commercially in Bangladesh. However, the film was later released commercially in only two theatres in Dhaka. The film was released on 30 April 2004 in New York and San Francisco coastal theatres. In October 2002, the film was released in Dhaka. Later year, on 4 July 2003, it was released commercially in the United Kingdom as the first Bangladeshi film. In the same year on 14 August, it was recorded due to a 4-week long exhibition in Dhaka. The film was re-released commercially on 29 July 2006 in Kolkata, India.

=== Controversy and censorship ===
After the initial screening at Cannes, the film got international press coverage for its positive portrayal of Bangladesh as well as its tolerant traditions. Due to its religious content the film was banned from public screening in the country by the Bangladesh Film Censor Board. The ban also claimed that it provided a distorted image of the madrasa system in the sub-continent. After a massive campaign against the ban was launched in the Bangladeshi media and on the Internet, there was pressure on the Bangladeshi Government to revoke the ban. Tareq and Catherine Masud brought a case against the ban in the Bangladesh Supreme Court, Appellate Division, which ruled in their favour. As a result, the film was allowed to be released in Bangladesh in late 2002.

=== Television broadcasting ===
Channel Four, the UK-based public service television broadcasting company, bought the broadcasting rights from ICA, the UK distributor of the film. In July 2005, as the first Bangladeshi film it was on-air in UK television. The film was later televised in Argentina on 26 September 2006, and in the United Kingdom on 20 December 2006.

=== Critical reception ===
Medium	Rating/%	Critic(s)
AllMovie	4/5 stars	-
AlloCiné	3.5/5 stars	13
Metacritic	75	14
Rotten Tomatoes	89%	27

"Easily one of the finest pictures of this year or any other. Masud's expansive fluidity is rapturous, inspired equally by the floating equanimity of Satyajit Ray and the work of the Iranian director Abbas Kiarostami, who deftly uses ritual behavior to provide social commentary."

— Elvis Mitchell, The New York Times

Matir Moina mainly received positive reviews from critics, viewers and film connoisseurs, who commented on the film's historical and social impact. The film received an average rating of 4/5 on the movie review website Allmovie. The French film database AlloCiné has an average rating of 3.5/5 based on 13 reviews. On the film review aggregator website Rotten Tomatoes, the film has an approval rating of 89% based on 27 reviews, with a rating average of 7.57/10. The site's critical consensus reads, it "has a kind of twofold eloquence." Metacritic, which gave its reviews a weighted average rating, with the film scoring 75 based on 14 critics, including "generally favorable reviews".

Peter Bradshaw of The Guardian said, "The film offers a valuable and independent engagement with Muslim history, quite different from the ugly fight-to-the-finish promoted elsewhere in the media, and constitutes a nuanced riposte both to the dogmatic verities of religion and also to a species of Islamophobia that assumes the Muslim world to be crudely monolithic. ..It is one of the films of the year." According to The Washington Post's Ann Hornaday, the low-cost film captures the lyricism of life in Bangladesh's waterways and cities, some scenes reminiscent of Jean Renoir's 1951 classic Le Fleuve. Ty Burr of The Boston Globe stated that the connection between personal, political and spiritual instability is revealed with the pure imagination of the autopsy. American film critic Frank Scheck writes in The Hollywood Reporter, the producers' clear sympathy for the film's characters and close knowledge of its subject matter makes the film come alive. Michael O'Sullivan commented in a review of The Washington Post that The Clay Bird hits a number of beautiful and lazy trends about the human condition. According to Eric Monder of Film Journal International, the film is somewhat restrained for its own drama, but at least for a contemporary audience, it sheds light on a significant part of world history. Marty Mapes of Movie Habit comments that the film is a good piece of armchair anthropology. American film historian and critic Elias Savada said, "The Clay Bird is a incredibly humbling experience." American writer and film critic Phil Hall stated in Film Threat, it a great film in Bangladesh. American journalist and historian Elliott Stein said, "The Clay Bird recalls the empathy for childhood's innocence and lust for living—as well as the visual rapture and naturalness—of Satyajit Ray's great Pather Panchali." According to the BBC's Jamie Russell, Anu skillfully created an increasingly gentle portrait of Masud during his transition through childhood. According to Sean Axmaker of Seattle Post-Intelligencer, the film is a timeless work with clear and elusive and almost historical features. Jamal Malik, a professor of German Islamic Studies of Pakistani descent, said the story of Matir Moina is presented in a textual structure similar to European art cinema. Indian filmmaker Aparna Sen praises the film.

=== Accolades ===
Tareque Masud was commemorated on Google Doodle on 6 December 2016, on his 60th birthday. Where an iconic bird represents the film Matir Moina.

List of awards and nominations
Organization	Year	Category	Recipients & nominees	Result	Ref.(s)
Bangladesh Cine-Journalist Association	2003	Best Film	Tareque Masud, Catherine Masud	Won	
Bangladesh Cine-Journalist Association	2003	Best Director	Tareque Masud	Won	
Bangladesh Cine-Journalist Association	2003	Best Story	Tareque Masud	Won	
Bangladesh Cine-Journalist Association	2003	Best screenplay	Tareque Masud	Won	
Bangladesh Cine-Journalist Association	2003	Best editing	Catherine Masud	Won	
Bangladesh Cine-Journalist Association	2003	Best art-direction	Kazi Rakib	Won	
Cannes Film Festival	2002	FIPRESCI Prize in section Directors' Fortnight	Tareque Masud	Won	
Channel I Film Awards	2003	Best film	Tareque Masud	Won	
Directors Guild of Great Britain	2004	Outstanding Directorial Achievement in Foreign Language Film	Tareque Masud	Nominated	
Kara Film Festival	2003	Best Feature Film	Tareque Masud	Won	
Kara Film Festival	2003	Best Musical Score	Moushumi Bhowmik	Won	
Marrakech International Film Festival	2002	Best Film	Tareque Masud	Nominated	
Marrakech International Film Festival	2002	Best Screenplay	Tareque Masud, Catherine Masud	Won	
National Film Awards	2002	Best Child Artist	Russell Farazi	Won	
National Film Awards	2002	Best Child Artist (Special prize)	Nurul Islam Bablu	Won	
National Film Awards	2002	Best Screenplay	Tareque Masud	Won	

=== Home media ===
On 16 June 2004, the film was released on DVD (only for Region 2) by its French producer, distributor and world sales representative mk2 under Warner Bros. Home Entertainment France. VCD and DVD versions of the film was released in Bangladesh on 15 April 2005 from Laser Vision. Which includes an additional two-hours documentary, featuring scenes, interviews and audience feedback. It is considered as the first interactive DVD in Bangladesh.

The film was released in DVD version in late 2005 by its North American distributor Milestone Films.

== See also ==
- List of Bangladeshi submissions for the Academy Award for Best Foreign Language Film
