= Mishuk Munier =

Bangladeshi journalist (1959–2011)

- মিশুক মুনীর
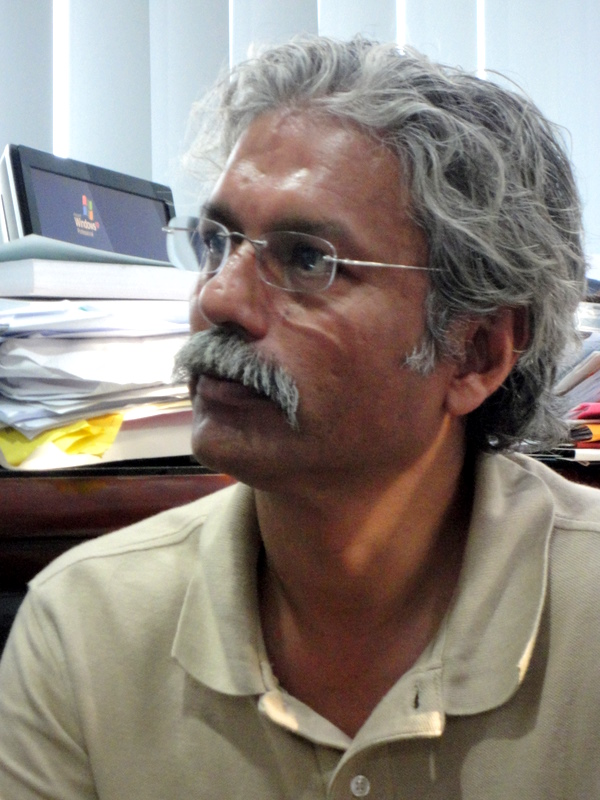
- Born: Ashfaque Munier; September 24, 1959; Dacca, East Pakistan, Pakistan
- Died: 13 August 2011 (aged 51); Manikganj, Dhaka, Bangladesh
- Education: Dhaka University
- Occupation: journalist
- Spouse: Monjuly Kazi
- Children: Nayeem Sebastien Munier
- Parent(s): Munier Choudhury and Lily Chowdhury
- Relatives: Ahmed Munier and Asif Munier (brothers)
- Awards: Ekushey Padak

Ashfaque Munier (September 24, 1959 – August 13, 2011; known as Mishuk Munier) was a Bangladeshi media specialist and broadcast journalist. He was known for his photography direction and for being the cofounder of the global news channel The Real News Network. He was one of three sons of Munier Chowdhury. Mishuk served as the chief executive officer and chief editor of satellite TV channel ATN News. He died in a road accident, along with Tareque Masud, on August 13, 2011. He was awarded Ekushey Padak for his contribution to journalism in 2012 by the Bangladeshi government.

== Career ==
Munier studied mass communication and journalism at Dhaka University. After completing his studies, he joined the faculty as a part-time lecturer in 1989. At the same time, he started to work for BBC as a freelance photographer. In 1999, Munier took a job as director of news operations of satellite TV channel Ekushey Television, playing a key role in broadcast journalism in Bangladesh. In 2002, he emigrated to Canada, where he worked for The Real News. He also contributed for BBC, WTN, ARD1, Channel 4, CBC, and Discovery Health. In November 2010, he returned to Bangladesh to act as CEO of ATN News.

== Family ==
Munier was the second son of Munier Chowdhury, who lost his life on December 14 during the 1971 Bangladesh Liberation War.

== Works ==
Munier worked as a cinematographer on many of Tarque Masud's films. He was the chief cinematographer of Tareque Masud's Runway and was working on Kagojer Phool when he died. He extensively worked on conflict zones, natural disasters and political upheavals. He worked as the director of photography for Return to Kandahar (2003) and also as the cinematographer of Words of Freedom (1999).

== Death ==
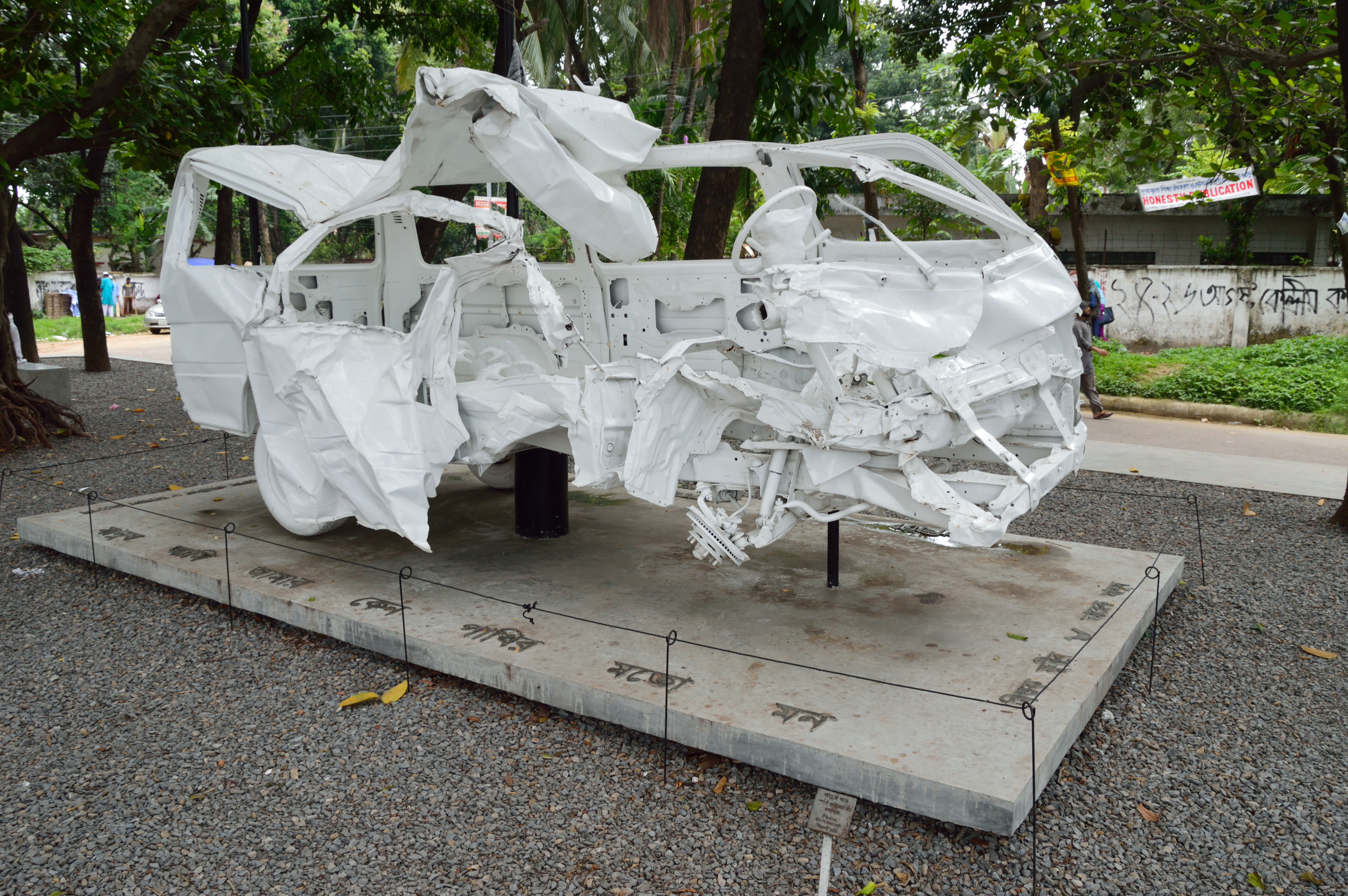
The wrecked microbus of Mishuk Munier and Tareque Masud is preserved at University of Dhaka Campus.

Munier and Tareque Masud died on a road accident on August 13, 2011, at Ghior of Manikganj with three others including camera assistant Wasif and the driver. The accident took place when the microbus collided with another bus coming from the opposite direction. The team was returning from location scouting for Masud's next movie, Kagojer Phool, in Manikganj.

With Munier's death, the International War Crimes Tribunal lost a key witness, as he had been involved in compiling documents and audio-visual evidence for the investigation agency of the international war crimes tribunal of Bangladesh. Mishuk and his uncle, Shamser Choudhury, were the only two witnesses who saw his father Munier Choudhury being taken away by collaborators of the Pakistani occupation force on December 14, 1971. Mishuk was to be a witness for the International Crimes Tribunal formed in March 2010.
