= Tareque Masud =

Bangladeshi film director

Tareque Al Masud
- তারেক মাসুদ
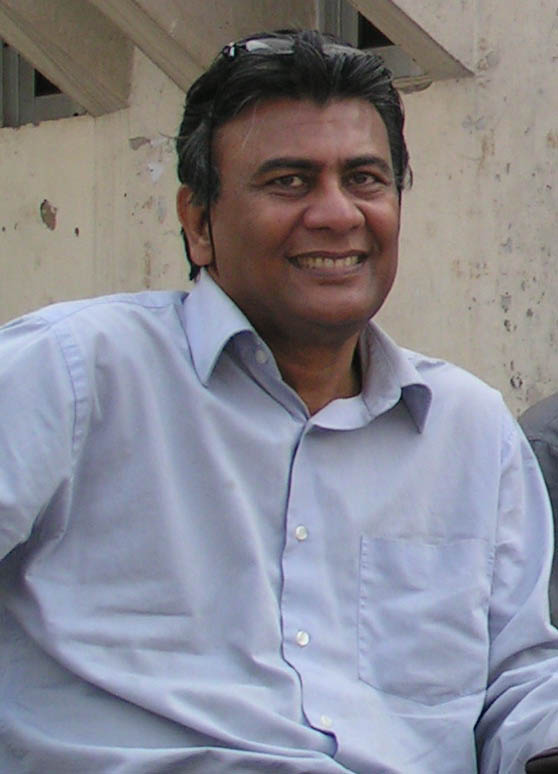
- Masud in Sylhet, December 2010
- Pronunciation: [t̪aɾek masud̪]
- Born: Abu Tareque Masud; 6 December 1956; Bhanga, Faridpur, East Pakistan
- Died: 13 August 2011 (aged 54); Ghior Upazila, Manikganj, Bangladesh
- Resting place: Nurpur, Bhanga, Faridpur
- Monuments: The Wreckage Microbus of Mishuk Munier and Tareque Masud
- Other name: Cinema Feriwalla
- Education: MA
- Alma mater: University of Dhaka
- Occupations: Film director; producer; screenwriter; lyricist
- Years active: 1995–2011
- Known for: Matir Moina
- Notable work: Muktir Gaan; Matir Moina
- Spouse: Catherine Masud
- Children: 1
- Awards: Ekushey Padak (2012)
- Website: tarequemasud.org

Tareque Masud (Note: Bengali pronunciation: [t̪aɾek masud̪].) (Bengali pronunciation: [t̪aɾek masud̪]; 6 December 1956 – 13 August 2011) was a Bangladeshi independent film director, film producer, screenwriter and lyricist. He first found success with the films Muktir Gaan (1995) and Matir Moina (2002), for which he won three international awards, including the International Critics' FIPRESCI Prize, in the Directors' Fortnight at 2002 Cannes Film Festival. The film became Bangladesh's first film to compete for the Academy Award for Best Foreign Language Film.

Masud died in a road accident on 13 August 2011 while returning to Dhaka from Manikganj on the Dhaka-Aricha highway after visiting a filming location. Masud was working on Kagojer Phool (The Paper Flower).

In 2012, he posthumously received Ekushey Padak, the second highest civilian award of Bangladesh. In 2013, New York University Asian/Pacific/American Institute, and South Asia Solidarity Initiative, hosted the first North American retrospective of his films.

== Background ==
Abu Tareque Masud was born on 6 December 1956 in Nurpur village, Bhanga Upazila, Faridpur District, East Pakistan (now Bangladesh). He grew up in Nurpur village and started his education in an Islamic school (madrasah). He studied in the madrassa system for eight years until the upheaval brought about by the 9-month Liberation War interrupted his education in 1971. After the war, he entered general education, completing his HSC from Notre Dame College and completed his master's degree in history from the University of Dhaka.

Tareque was involved in the film society movement from his university days and started his first film, Adam Surat (The Inner Strength), a documentary on the Bangladeshi painter SM Sultan, in 1982. His 1995 feature-length documentary on the 1971 Liberation War, Muktir Gaan (Song of Freedom), brought record audiences and became a cult classic. He also made many other films on the war, including Muktir Kotha (Words of Freedom, 1999), Narir Kotha (Women and War, 2000) and Naroshundor (The Barbershop, 2009). In 2002, he completed his feature film Matir Moina (The Clay Bird), which was based on his childhood experience in the madrassa.

As a part of his filmmaking work, he was a pioneer of the independent film movement in Bangladesh. In 1986, Tareque was a founding member of Bangladesh Short Film Forum, the leading platform for independent filmmakers in Bangladesh. In 1988, he organized the country's first International Short and Documentary Film Festival, which is held on a biannual basis to this day. He was also known as the "Cinema Feriwalla" for the way in which he showed his films, touring remote towns and villages throughout the country with his mobile projection unit.

His wife, an American-born film editor Catherine Masud, was his creative partner. They met at the time he was completing work on Adam Surat and spent the next two decades making films together through their production house Audiovision. Together they wrote scripts, often co-directed, and toured the country and the world with their films. Catherine also edited all of their work.

== Early career ==
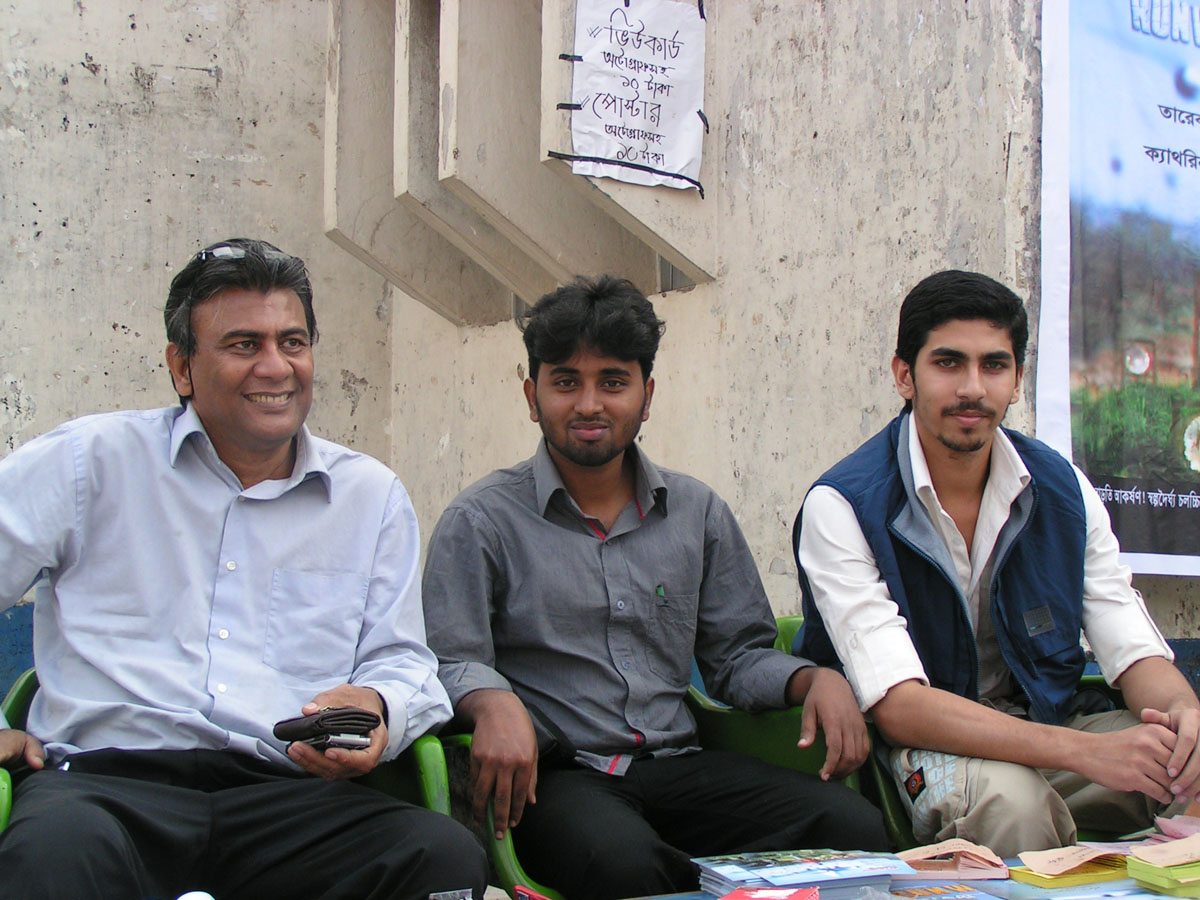
From left; Masud, Bashar and right Murshed (Moviyana Film Society Member) at the show of Runway in Sylhet

Masud's first film was the documentary Adam Surat (Inner Strength) on the Bangladeshi painter SM Sultan which he completed in 1989. His most famous film in the early age of his career was the documentary Muktir Gaan (The Song of Freedom, 1995) where the camera follows a music troupe during the Liberation War of Bangladesh in 1971. The members of the troupe sing songs to inspire freedom fighters.

His first full-length feature film, Matir Moina ("The Clay Bird", 2002) which debuted at the Cannes Film Festival, derives inspiration from his own childhood experiences. He won the International Critic's Award at the Cannes Film Festival in 2002 for this film, as well as the FIPRESCI Prize for Directors' Fortnight for "its authentic, moving and delicate portrayal of a country struggling for its democratic rights." Matir Moina was received with critical praise and toured the international circuit. It was one of the first Bangladeshi films to be widely circulated and was greeted with enthusiasm for its realistic depiction of life without the melodrama that is prevalent in many other South Asian films.

His film, Ontarjatra ("Homeland", 2006), featured two generations of Bangladeshi diaspora in London and their return to Bangladesh. His next feature film, Runway (2010) was about the influence of radical religious teachings on a young boy, caught between many modernistic. Masud's last unfinished project was Kagojer Phool ("The Paper Flower"), about the partition of the Indian subcontinent. This film has become a prequel to Matir Moina (2002).

== Personal life ==
Masud and Catherine Shapere have a son, Nishad Bingham Putra Masud.

== Death ==
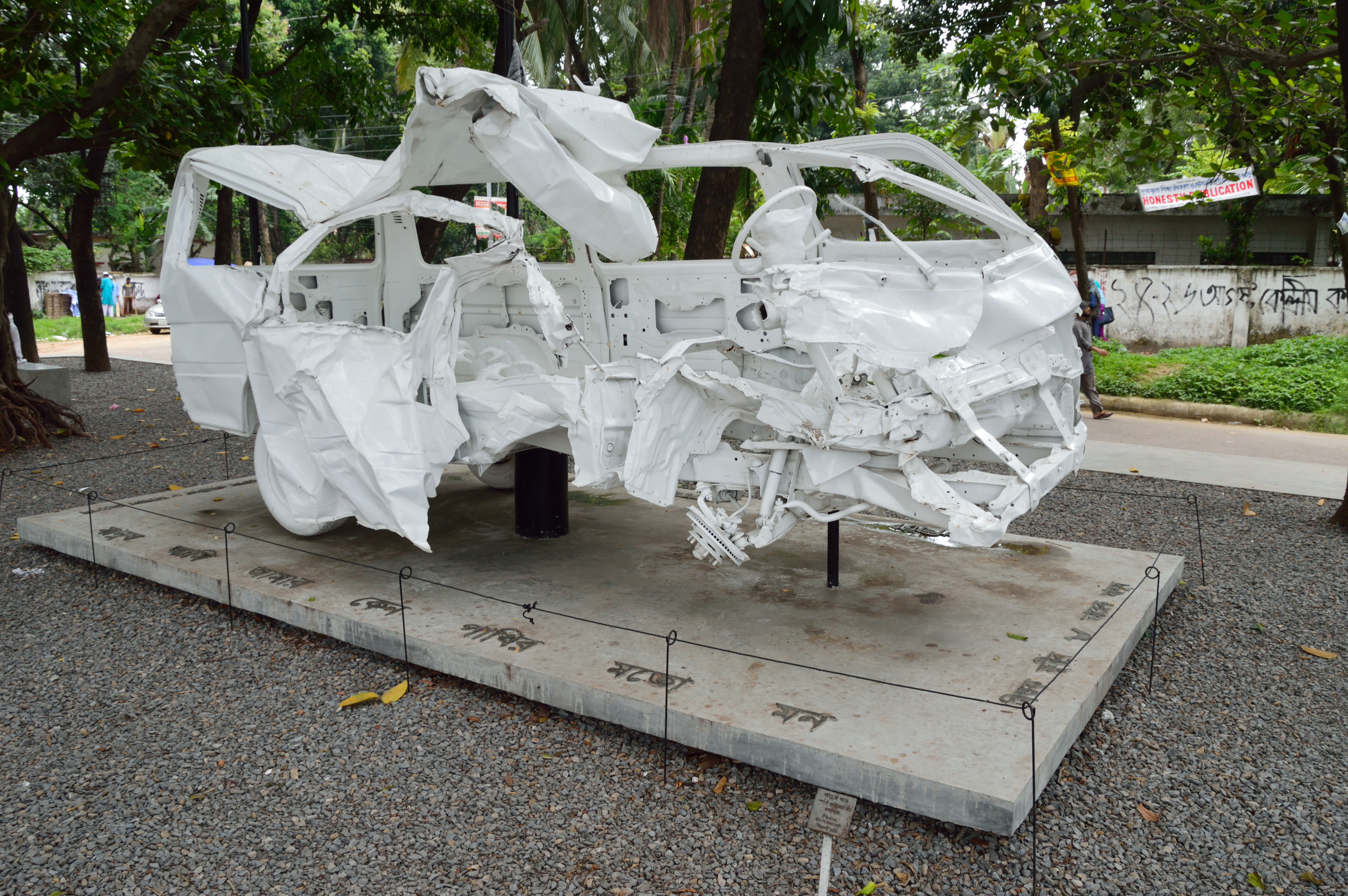
The Wreckage Microbus of Mishuk Munier and Tareque Masud is preserved at University of Dhaka Campus.

On 13 August 2011, Masud died in a road accident at Joka under Ghior Upazila while returning to Dhaka from Manikganj on the Dhaka-Aricha highway after visiting a shooting location. His microbus collided head-on with an oncoming passenger bus (Chuadanga Deluxe, Dhaka Metro Ba 14-4288). He along with the other passengers were travelling to choose shooting locations for his new film Kagojer Phool (The Paper Flower), filming of which was supposed to begin after shooting locations were finalized.

Masud was travelling with long-time co-worker Mishuk Munier, a cinematographer, journalist and CEO of ATN News. Munier also died in the accident.

Masud's wife, Catherine, along with four others, survived the accident. Since his death, Catherine has established the Tareque Masud Memorial Trust, which is dedicated to the task of archiving and memorializing Masud's work through publications, educational projects, screening programs, and the completion of their unfinished works.

== Legacy ==
On 6 December 2018, a Google Doodle was displayed on Google Bangladesh page to celebrate his 62nd birthday.

== Awards ==
Masud was received many international and national awards for his notable works. He received Best Film Award from Bengal Film Journalists' Association Awards in 1996 and a Special Jury Prize from Festival of South Asian Documentaries in 1997 and a National Award for Documentary film Muktir Gaan.

He received an International Critics' FIPRESCI Prize, in the Directors' Fortnight section outside competition at the 2002 Cannes Film Festival. Best Screenplay Award from International Film Festival of Marrakech in 2002. Best Film Award from Bengal Film Journalists' Association Awards, Kara Film Festival and Channel I Film Awards in 2003 from the film Matir Moina (2002).

After Masud received Jury Prize from International Video Festival of India in 2003, Best Direction award from International Film Festival Bangladesh in 2006, Special Jury Award, Osian's Cinefan Festival Delhi in 2006, Meril Prothom Alo Awards in 2010 etc.

In 2012, he received Ekushey Padak, the highest civilian award of Bangladesh posthumously. In 2013, New York University Asian/Pacific/American Institute, and South Asia Solidarity Initiative, hosted the first North American retrospective of his films.

| Year | Film | Role | Notes |
|---|---|---|---|
| 1995 | Muktir Gaan | Director | Special Mention – Festival of southasian documentaries at Film South Asia, 1997; Best Film — Bengal Film Journalists' Association Awards, 1996; National Award for Documentary, 1996 |
| 2002 | Muktir Kotha | Director | Best Narrative Documentary — Three Continents Festival, 2002 |
| 2002 | Matir Moina | Director | FIPRESCI Prize in section Directors' Fortnight, 2002 Cannes Film Festival; Nominated - Best Film - Marrakech International Film Festival 2002; Best Screenplay - Marrakech International Film Festival 2002; Best film - Channel I Film Awards 2003; Best Film - 33rd Bachsas Awards; Best Director - 33rd Bachsas Awards; Best Story - 33rd Bachsas Awards; Best screenplay - 33rd Bachsas Awards; Best Feature Film — Kara Film Festival 2003; Bangladesh National Film Award for Best Screenplay - 27th Bangladesh National Film Awards, 2004; Nominated - Outstanding Directorial Achievement in Foreign Language Film — Directors Guild of Great Britain; Bangladeshi submissions for the Academy Award for Best Foreign Language Film 2002 |
| 2002 | A Kind of Childhood | Director | Jury Prize – International Video Festival of India, 2003 |
| 2006 | Ontarjatra | Director | Best Direction – International Film Festival Bangladesh, 2006; Special Jury Award — Osian's Cinefan Festival of Asian and Arab Cinema, 2006 |
| 2010 | Runway | Director | Best Film — Meril Prothom Alo Awards, 2010; 2004 Nominated – Directors Guild of Great Britain, Outstanding Directorial Achievement in Foreign Language Film |

== Frequent collaborators ==
Masud has frequently cast the same actors more than once in films that he has directed.

== Recurring themes ==
Masud's films have recurring themes with subtexts. These include the religious conflicts between humanity and society, strong female characters, and a strong patriot movement.

== Filmography ==
| Year | Title | Credited as | | | | Notes | Ref(s) |
| Year | Title | Director | Writer | Producer | Other | Notes | Ref(s) |
|---|---|---|---|---|---|---|---|
| 1985 | Shonar Beri | Yes | Yes | No | No | Documentary film | |
| 1989 | Adam Surat | Yes | No | Yes | No | Biographical documentary on SM Sultan | |
| 1992 | Unison | Yes | Yes | No | No | Animated documentary film | |
| 1993 | Shey | Yes | Yes | No | No | Documentary film Co-directed by Shameem Akhter | |
| 1995 | Muktir Gaan | Yes | No | No | No | Documentary film footage filmed by Lear Levin | |
| 1997 | Shishu Kantha | Yes | Yes | No | No | Documentary film | |
| 1999 | Nirapotter Namey | Yes | Yes | No | No | Documentary film | |
| 1999 | Muktir Kotha | Yes | No | No | No | Documentary film | |
| 2000 | Narir Kotha | Yes | Yes | Yes | No | Documentary film | |
| 2002 | Matir Moina | Yes | Yes | No | No | Co-written with Catherine Masud | |
| 2002 | A Kind of Childhood | Yes | Yes | No | No | Documentary film Co-directed with Catherine Masud | |
| 2006 | Ontarjatra | Yes | Yes | No | No | Co-directed with Catherine Masud | |
| 2008 | Kansater Pothay | Yes | Yes | No | No | Documentary film Co-directed with Catherine Masud | |
| 2009 | Noroshundor | Yes | Yes | No | No | Co-directed with Catherine Masud | |
| 2010 | Runway | Yes | Yes | No | Yes | Music director Co-directed with Catherine Masud | |
| TBA | Kagojer Phul | No | Yes | No | No | an unfinished feature | |

== See also ==
- Artistic depictions of Bangladesh Liberation War
- Bengali cinema
- Cinema of Bangladesh
