= Catherine Masud =

American film producer

- Born: Catherine Lucretia Shapere; May 27, 1963 (age 62); Chicago
- Occupation: Filmmaking
- Known for: Filmmaker

Catherine Masud (Bengali: ক্যাথরিন মাসুদ) is an American-born filmmaker, residing in Bangladesh from 1995 to 2015. She now lives in the United States. She has collaborated with her husband & filmmaking partner Tareque Masud to make numerous shorts, documentaries and features, many of which have been nationally/internationally awarded and shown around the world. Since Tareque's untimely death in August 2011, Catherine has devoted herself to the archiving and preservation of his work, and the completion of their unfinished oeuvre.

== Professional life ==
A graduate of Brown University, she also studied fine arts at the Art Institute of Chicago, and film production in New York. Among many other films, she produced and co-wrote the acclaimed feature Matir Moyna (The Clay Bird), directed by Tareque, which won the International Critics' Prize at Cannes. Thematically many of their films address the relationship between religious and cultural identity in the context of South Asia. She edits all of her films and has taught numerous courses and workshops on various aspects of cinema at universities and training institutes. More recently she has served as an adviser to the Bangladesh National Film Archives and the National Film and Television Institute (under development), and is a founding member of the South Asian Children's Cinema Forum, a regional body for the promotion of children's cinema.

Since the death of Tareque Masud, Catherine Masud has worked on rereleasing all of their older films on DVD, as well as editing a book on his life. She has curated more than 100 film screenings in 35 different venues around the country in collaboration with local community groups, student organizations and film societies in continuation of Tareque Masud's philosophy of 'total filmmaking' activist engagement with audience. She has published two books on Tareque Masud, and is working on two more in works: a collection of screenplays, and selected interviews (in collaboration with Dept. of Media Studies at University of Liberal Arts Bangladesh). She has successfully lobbied the Bangladesh government to institute reforms to film industry, which led to declaration of film as an official "Industry" and lifting of excessive taxation and introduction of tax holiday for new theaters. She chairs the Tareque Masud Memorial Trust.

== Personal life ==
She was born Catherine Lucretia Shapere in Chicago in 1963. Catherine graduated from Brown University, with a degree in economics. In late 1980s, she met Tareque Masud and they married in 1988. Since 1995, she has been living and working in Dhaka, Bangladesh. She and her husband have one child, Nishad Bingham Putra Masud. She was widowed by a road accident on August 13, 2011.
