= 38th Bangladesh National Film Awards =

National Film Awards, Bangladesh

- Awarded for: Best of Bangladeshi cinema in 2013
- Awarded by: President of Bangladesh
- Presented by: Ministry of Information
- Presented on: 4 April 2015
- Site: Dhaka, Bangladesh
- Hosted by: Zahid Hasan
- Official website: moi.gov.bd

Highlights
- Best Feature Film: Mrittika Maya
- Best Non-feature Film: Shunety Ki Pao
- Best Actor: Titas Zia
- Best Actress: Moushumi and Shormi Mala
- Lifetime achievement: Kabori Sarwar
- Most awards: Mrittika Maya (17)

The 38th National Film Awards were presented by the Ministry of Information, Bangladesh, to felicitate the best of Bangladeshi cinema released in the year 2013. The ceremony took place in Dhaka, and awards were given by the prime minister of Bangladesh.

== List of winners ==
| Name of Awards | Winner(s) | Film |
|---|---|---|
| Lifetime Achievement Award | Sarah Begum Kobori | |
| Best Film | Gazi Rakayet and Faridur Reza Sagor | Mrittika Maya |
| Best Documentary Film | Kamar Ahmad Simon and Sara Afreen | Shunte Ki Pao! (Are You Listening!) |
| Best Director | Gazi Rakayet | Mrittika Maya |
| Best Actor | Titas Zia | Mrittika Maya |
| Best Actress | Moushumi; Shormi Mala | Devdas; Mrittika Maya |
| Best Actor in a Supporting Role | Raisul Islam Asad | Mrittika Maya |
| Best Actress in a Supporting Role | Aparna Ghosh | Mrittika Maya |
| Best Actor in a Negative Role | Mamunur Rashid | Mrittika Maya |
| Best Child Artist | Md Saif Khan Swachho | Ekee Britte |
| Best Special Child Artist | Syeda Wahida Sabrina | Ontordhan |
| Best Music Director | AK Azad; Shawkat Ali Emon | Mrittika Maya; Purno Doirgho Prem Kahini |
| Best Music Composer | Kaushik Hossain Taposh | Purno Doirgho Prem Kahini |
| Best Lyricist | Kabir Bakul | Purno Doirgho Prem Kahini |
| Best Male Playback Singer | Chandan Sinha | Purno Doirgho Prem Kahini |
| Best Female Playback Singer | Runa Laila; Sabina Yasmin | Devdas |
| Best Story | Gazi Rakayet | Mrittika Maya |
| Best Dialogue | Gazi Rakayet | Mrittika Maya |
| Best Screenplay | Gazi Rakayet | Mrittika Maya |
| Best Art Direction | Uttam Guho | Mrittika Maya |
| Best Editing | Md. Shoriful Isam Rasel | Mrittika Maya |
| Best Cinematography | Saiful Islam Badal | Mrittika Maya |
| Best Sound Recording | Kazi Selim | Mrittika Maya |
| Best Costume Design | Wahida Mallik Jolly | Mrittika Maya |
| Best Makeup | Md. Babul Ali | Mrittika Maya |

== See also ==
- Meril Prothom Alo Awards
- Ifad Film Club Award
- Babisas Award
