= Enamtara Begum =

Bangladeshi costume designer and performing artist

Enamtara Begum Saki
- এনামতারা বেগম সাকি
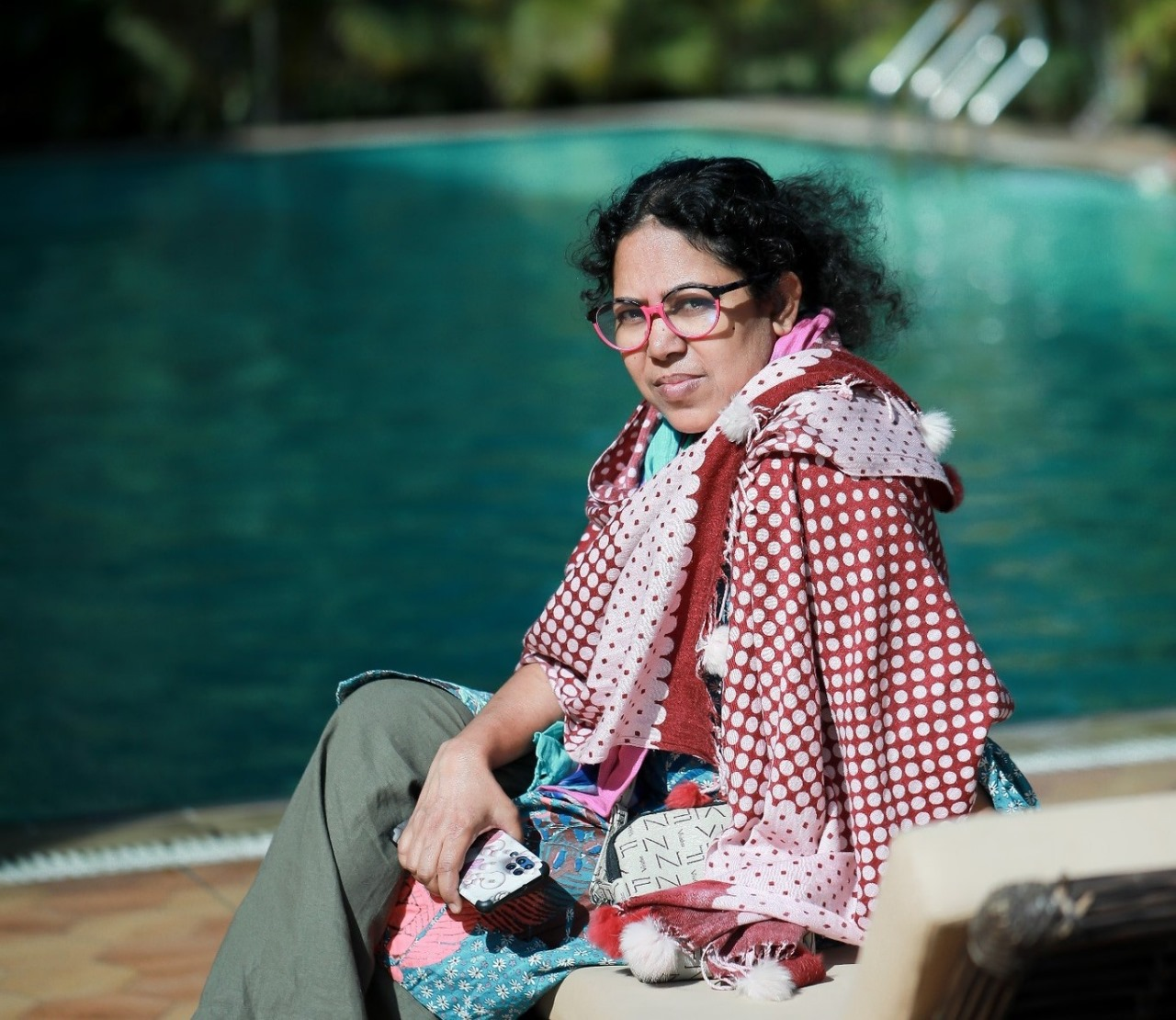
- Born: 10 December; Kurigram, Bangladesh
- Occupations: Costume designer, Performing artist
- Years active: 1990–present
- Notable work: Gor (The Grave)
- Awards: National Film Award (2020)

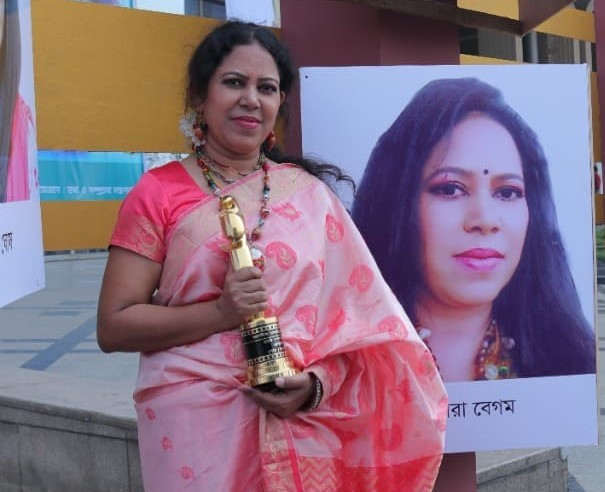
Enamtara Begum Saki on 45th Bangladesh National Film Awards

Enamtara Begum (এনামতারা বেগম) is a Bangladeshi costume designer and performing artist. She is also known as Saki or Sakitara (সাকী বা সাকীতারা). She won the 45th Bangladesh National Film Awards in 2020 for Best Costume Design in the film Gor (The Grave). She has designed costumes for approximately 100 productions in theater and film. She also serves as a trainer for acting workshops organized by the Bangladesh Group Theatre Federation and Bangladesh Shilpakala Academy, and provides guest training in costume design at various universities and theater schools.

== Early life and education ==
Enamtara Saki was born on 10 December in Kurigram, Bangladesh. Her mother, Bushra Haque, is a retired school teacher, and her father, Alhaj Md. Enamul Haque, is a retired army person. She spent her childhood between her maternal and paternal grandfather's homes, both families being involved in politics, education, and arts, inspiring her early interest in cultural activities.

Her maternal grandfather, S. M. Ahmad Hossain, was a teacher at Kurigram River View High School and a patron of arts. Her maternal uncle, Iqbal Hossain Babla, was a prominent figure in the traditional Prochchod theatre of Kurigram. Another paternal uncle, Md. Shamsul Haque, was head of the Kurigram district Mukul Fauj.

Due to her parents' profession, the family moved to Dhaka around 1974. Saki attended Balughat High School and a few days later, she was admitted to the Dhaka Cantonment Board Adarsha Vidya Niketan in Manikdi. Completing primary and secondary education, she completed higher secondary and undergraduate studies at Tejgaon College and later joined Government Titumir College for postgraduate studies in Zoology. Eventually, she pursued a master's degree in Theater from the Department of Theater and Performance Studies, University of Dhaka.

== Career ==
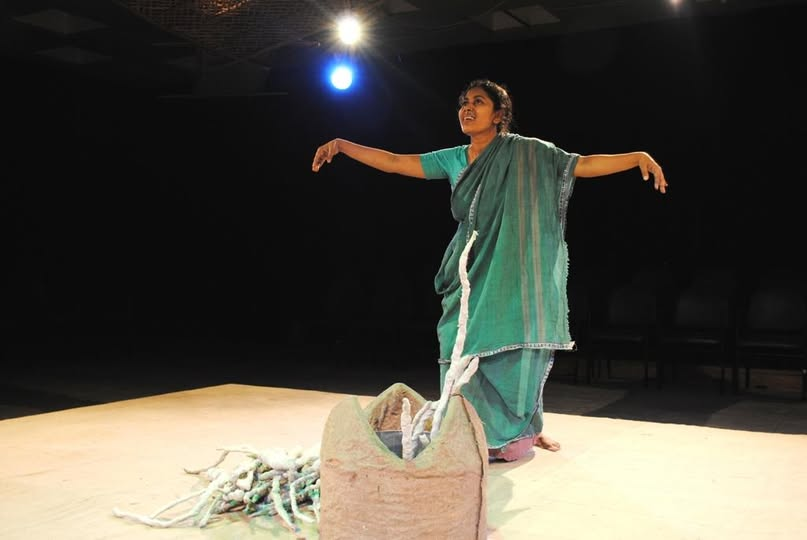
Stage play Putra performed by Enamtara Begum Saki

Saki began her theater career with Dhaka Sarak Theatre, debuting on stage in the play Ekka Dokka. During university, she designed costumes for A Doll's House, initially as an academic requirement, but developed a passion for costume design. She continued designing for theater and film while performing as an actress.

After her postgraduate degree, she briefly worked in NGOs but focused entirely on arts after 2007. She has designed costumes for nearly 100 productions and acted in around 20. She won the National Film Award in 2020 for costume design in Gor (The Grave), directed by Gazi Rakayet and produced by Impress Telefilm. In 2013, her costume designs won a booth exhibition award at the World Costume Festival in Vigan, Philippines. She currently serves as General Secretary of the Kissa Kahini Theatre Group.

== Personal life ==
Saki married Mohammad Jasim Uddin, a light designer and theater director associated with Bangladesh Shilpakala Academy, in 2003. They have one daughter, Ankon Tara Rath Sukonna, and one son, Chitro Path Tepantor. In her leisure time, she enjoys painting, playing dotara, and singing.

== Costume design work ==
Year	Production Name	Production Type	Production Authority / Director	Ref.
2025	Koitori (The Lost Identity)	Short Film	Director Adnan Abhi, Pathshala, South Asian Institute	
2025	Joya	Film (Shooting Ongoing)	Director Golam Mostofa	
2025	Baka Uthanta	Short Film	Director Aminur Rahman Mukul	
2025	Manush Dekho (See the Person)	Film	Director Gazi Rakayet	
2025	Subhankar Hat Dharte Ceyechilo	Theater	Tirandaj Repertory	
2025	Nityapuran	Theater	Diaspora, New York	
2024	Otho Gandhari	Theater	Theater Department, Tejgaon College, Dhaka	
2024	Pulsirat	Film	Director Rakhal Shobuj	
2024	Animal Costume	Children's Drama	Pidim Theater	
2024	Rangin Chorki	Theater	Shunyan Repertory Theater, Dhaka	
2023	Surendra Kumari	Theater	Mahakal Natya Sampraday, Dhaka	
2023	Meril-Prothom Alo Awards (Drama Part)	Award Given Ceremony	Meril Prothom Alo 2023	
2023	Bohe Prantajan	Theater	Bangladesh Shilpakala Academy, Rajshahi	
2023	Uraal	Film	Director Zobaidur Rahman, Jatra Party, Dhaka	
2023	Rajdrohi	Theater	Ethic Theater, Dhaka	
2023	Janmasutra	Film	Bangladesh Cinema and Television Institute (BCTI) & Impress Telefilm, Dhaka	
2023	Acholayoton	Theater	Renaissance Drama Society, Melbourne, Australia	
2023	Neta Je Rate Nihoto Holen	Theater	Ethic Theater, Dhaka	
2023	Adam Surat	Theater	Tardua Natya Dal, Dhaka	
2023	Droho O Bedanar Upakhyan	Theater	Bangladesh Shilpakala Academy, Narayanganj	
2023	Raja Gilgamesh	Theater	Faridpur Theater & Bagerhat Theater, Dhaka	
2022	Nissongo Lorai	Yatra	Bangladesh Shilpakala Academy, Dhaka	
2022	Sonar Manush Matir Manush	Theater	Bangladesh Shilpakala Academy, Tangail	
2022	Joy Banglar Joyotsob	Independence Golden Jubilee Closing Ceremony	Ministry of Liberation War Affairs	
2022	Rajnetro	Theater	Aranyak Natya Dal, Dhaka	
2022	Nishobdo 71	Theater	British Council Bangladesh, Dhaka	
2022	Honnakaler Protnopuran	Theater	Bangladesh Shilpakala Academy, Sirajganj	
2022	Roktonodi Gorai	Theater	Bangladesh Shilpakala Academy, Kushtia	
2022	Madhav Malonchi	Theater	Theater Art Unit, Dhaka	
2021	Chokhbanda Microbus O Shunyotar Golpo	Theater	Bangladesh Shilpakala Academy, Dhaka	
2021	Khuli	Theater	Bangladesh Shilpakala Academy, Tangail	
2021	Lalbridge Otopor	Theater	Bangladesh Shilpakala Academy, Chuadanga	
2020	Jindabahar	Television Drama Serial	Bangladesh Television, Dhaka	
2020	Gor	Film	Impress Telefilm, Dhaka	
2019	Radharaman	Theater	Bandhan Theater, Sunamganj	
2019	Arto	Film	Sanskritayon, Dhaka	
2018	Ora Kadam Ali	Theater	Drrishyakabya, Dhaka	
2018	Boishakhini	Theater	Shobdaboli Group Theater, Barishal	
2017	Uronto Pakhi	Dance Drama	Bangladesh Shilpakala Academy, Dhaka	
2016	Shesh Nawab	Theater	Charunirdham, Dhaka	
2016	Mahabidya	Theater	Kissa Kahini, Dhaka	
2016	Bagh Eseche	Theater	Wild Team Bangladesh, Dhaka	
2016	Badh	Theater	Bangladesh Shilpakala Academy, Dhaka	
2016	Mortyer Arasik	Theater	Banglalok, Dhaka	
2016	Saheb Chander Eid Bhojon	Theater	Shobdaboli Group Theater, Barishal	
2015	Bibek	Film	Rainyday, Dhaka	
2015	Sukh Chander Mor	Theater	Kissa Kahini, Dhaka	
2014	Dakghar	Theater	Peoples Little Theater, Dhaka	
2014	Sompurkothon	Theater	Bangladesh Shilpakala Academy, Joypurhat	
2014	Wari Boteswar	Theater	Bangladesh Shilpakala Academy, Narsingdi	
2014	Bishadsindhu	Theater	Aboyob Natya Dal, Dhaka	
2014	Shopnopothik	Theater	Aranyak Natya Dal, Dhaka	
2013	Behula Basor	Theater	Bangladesh Shilpakala Academy, Dhaka	
2013	Rajar Chithi	Theater	Jagoroni Theater, Savar	
2013	Dondo	Theater	Bangladesh Shilpakala Academy, Dhaka	
2013	Rathjatra	Theater	Loknatya Dal, Dhaka	
2013	Target Platoon	Theater	National Theater Repertory, Dhaka	
2012	Acrobatic Team Costumes	Acrobatics	Bangladesh Shilpakala Academy, Dhaka	
2010	Mujib Mane Mukti	Theater	Loknatya Dal, Dhaka	
2010	Na Manush	Theater	Natgaur, Dhaka	
2009	Sitar Agniporikkha	Theater	Sadhana, Dhaka	
2009	Putro	Theater	Bangladesh Shilpakala Academy, Dhaka	
2008	Boishakhi Gan	Film	Bengal Creative Media, Dhaka	
2008	Dakghar	Theater	Loknatya Dal, Dhaka	
2008	The Comedy of Errors	Theater	Cine & Drama Club, North South University, Dhaka	
2007	Lilabati Akhyán	Theater	Loknatya Dal, Dhaka	
2006	Baichal	Theater	Bangladesh Shilpakala Academy, Rajbari	
2006	Behula Bhashan	Theater	Theater & Performance Studies Dept., Dhaka University, Dhaka	
2006	Costume Design Coordinator - Harold Printer Natya Utsab	Theater	British Council & Theater & Performance Studies Dept., Dhaka University, Dhaka	
2006	Onno Gazi'r Onno Kissa	Theater	Natya Jan, Dhaka Theater & Performance Studies Dept., Dhaka University	
2006	Lady from the Sea	Theater	Theater & Performance Studies Dept., Dhaka University, Dhaka	
2006	Romeo and Juliet	Theater	Independent University, Dhaka	
2006	A New Testament of Romeo & Juliet	Theater	Shobdaboli Group Theater, Barishal	
2005	Scapin	Theater	Cine & Drama Club, North South University, Dhaka	
2005	Karnakotha	Theater	Aboyob Natya Dal	
2005	Advertisement of British American Tobacco Co.	Television	Asiatic MCL, Dhaka	
2005	Sisimpur, 1st 10 Episodes (Assistant Costume Designer)	Television Pappet Series	Bangladesh Television	
2004	Tartuffe	Theater	Cine & Drama Club, North South University, Dhaka	
2003	Would Be Gentleman	Theater	Cine & Drama Club, North South University, Dhaka	
2003	Macbeth	Theater	Theater & Performance Studies Dept., Dhaka University, Dhaka	
2003	Neel Moyur-er Joubon	Theater	Shobdaboli Group Theater, Barishal	
2003	Darpan	Theater	Pragati Songh, Dinajpur	
2002	Shopno	Theater	Brittapat, Dhaka	
2002	Nepathy Kotha	Theater	Dhaka Nandanik, Dhaka	
2001	The Taming of the Shrew	Theater	Cine & Drama Club, North South University, Dhaka	
2001	Amar Bishonno Mukh	Theater	Monchashromik, Dhaka	
2001	Kabar	Theater	Dhaka University Theater, Dhaka	
2001	Oedipus	Theater	Bangladesh Group Theater Federation, Dhaka	
2001	Kal Sokale	Theater	Theater Art Unit, Dhaka	
2001	Hasur Gan	Theater	Theater Center for Social Development, Dhaka	
2000	Shishurajyo	Theater	Center for Social Theater Development, Dhaka	
2000	Kajol Rekha	Theater	Shobdaboli Group Theater, Barishal	
1999	A Doll's House	Theater	Theater & Performance Studies Dept., Dhaka University, Dhaka	
1996	Oedipus	Theater	Theater & Performance Studies Dept., Dhaka University, Dhaka	

== Acting ==
Year	Production Name	Type	Production Authority / Director	Ref.
2025	Koitori (The Lost Identity)	Film	Pathshala South Asian Institute	
2023	Uraal	Film	Jatra Party, Dhaka	
2020	1971 Sei Shob Din	Film	Jazz Multimedia, Dhaka	
2017	Rizwan	Theater	Natbangla, Director Syed Jamil Ahmed	
2016	Mahabidya	Theater	Kissa Kahini, Dhaka	
2015	Bibek	Film	Rainyday, Dhaka	
2015	Sukh Chander Mor	Theater	Kissa Kahini, Dhaka	
2014	Bishadsindhu	Theater	Aboyob Natya Dal, Dhaka	
2013	Behula Basor	Theater	Bangladesh Shilpakala Academy, Dhaka	
2009	Putro	Theater	Bangladesh Shilpakala Academy, Dhaka	
2005	Abhiggat	Film	Impress Telefilm, Dhaka	
2002	Shopno	Theater	Brittapat, Dhaka	
2001	Kabar	Theater	Dhaka University Theater, Dhaka	
2000	Shakuntala (Dance Drama)	Theater	Theater & Performance Studies Dept., Dhaka University, Dhaka	
1999	A Doll's House	Theater	Theater & Performance Studies Dept., Dhaka University, Dhaka	
1998	Komlarani'r Sagar Dighi	Theater	Theater & Performance Studies Dept., Dhaka University, Dhaka	
1997	Urubhangam	Theater	Theater & Performance Studies Dept., Dhaka University, Dhaka	
1996	Edipus	Theater	Theater & Performance Studies Dept., Dhaka University, Dhaka	
1995	Mime	Theater	Theater & Performance Studies Dept., Dhaka University, Dhaka	
1993	Tahader Kotha	Theater	Dhaka Sarak, Dhaka	
1991	Nishobdo Niyoti	Theater	Dhaka Sarak, Dhaka	
1990	Ekka Dokka	Theater	Dhaka Sarak, Dhaka	

== Direction Work ==
Year	Production Name	Type	Production Authority / Director
2016	Mahabidya	Theater	Kissa Kahini, Dhaka
2005	Manob Dhormo (Workshop Production)	Theater	Bangladesh Group Theater Federation, Dinajpur
2004	Adbhoot Trash (Workshop Production)	Theater	Bangladesh Group Theater Federation, Narayanganj
2001	Hasur Gan (Children's Drama)	Theater	Theater Center for Social Development, Dhaka
2000	Shishurajyo (Children's Drama)	Theater	Theater Center for Social Development, Dhaka

== Playwriting ==
- Swapnacop
- Hasur Gan
- Shishurajyo

== Awards and honors ==
Year	Award / Honor Name	Type	Awarded By	Ref.
2025	Shubhechha Smarak	Commemorative	Jahangirnagar Theater	
2023	Bohe Prantajan Smarak	Honor	District Shilpakala Academy, Rajshahi	
2023	Rajdrohi Costume Design Honor	Honor	Ethic Natya Dal, Dhaka	
2022	Ethic Youth Honor	Honor	Ethic Natya Dal, Dhaka	
2022	Shubhechha Smarak	Commemorative	District Shilpakala Academy, Madaripur	
2022	Yugala Sammanana	Honor	Byatikram Nattodal, Dhaka	
2020	National Film Award	Award	Ministry of Information, Govt. of Bangladesh	
2013	Rajar Chithi 25th Performance Commemorative	Commemorative	Jagoroni Theater, Savar	
2013	Booth Exhibition Award	Award	World Costume Festival, Vigan, Philippines	
2006	Rudra Natya Dal	Commemorative	Rudra Natya Dal, Bagerhat	
2000	Young Designer of the Millennium Award	Award	KAY KRAFT, Dhaka, Bangladesh	
