= Costume =

Wardrobe and dress in general

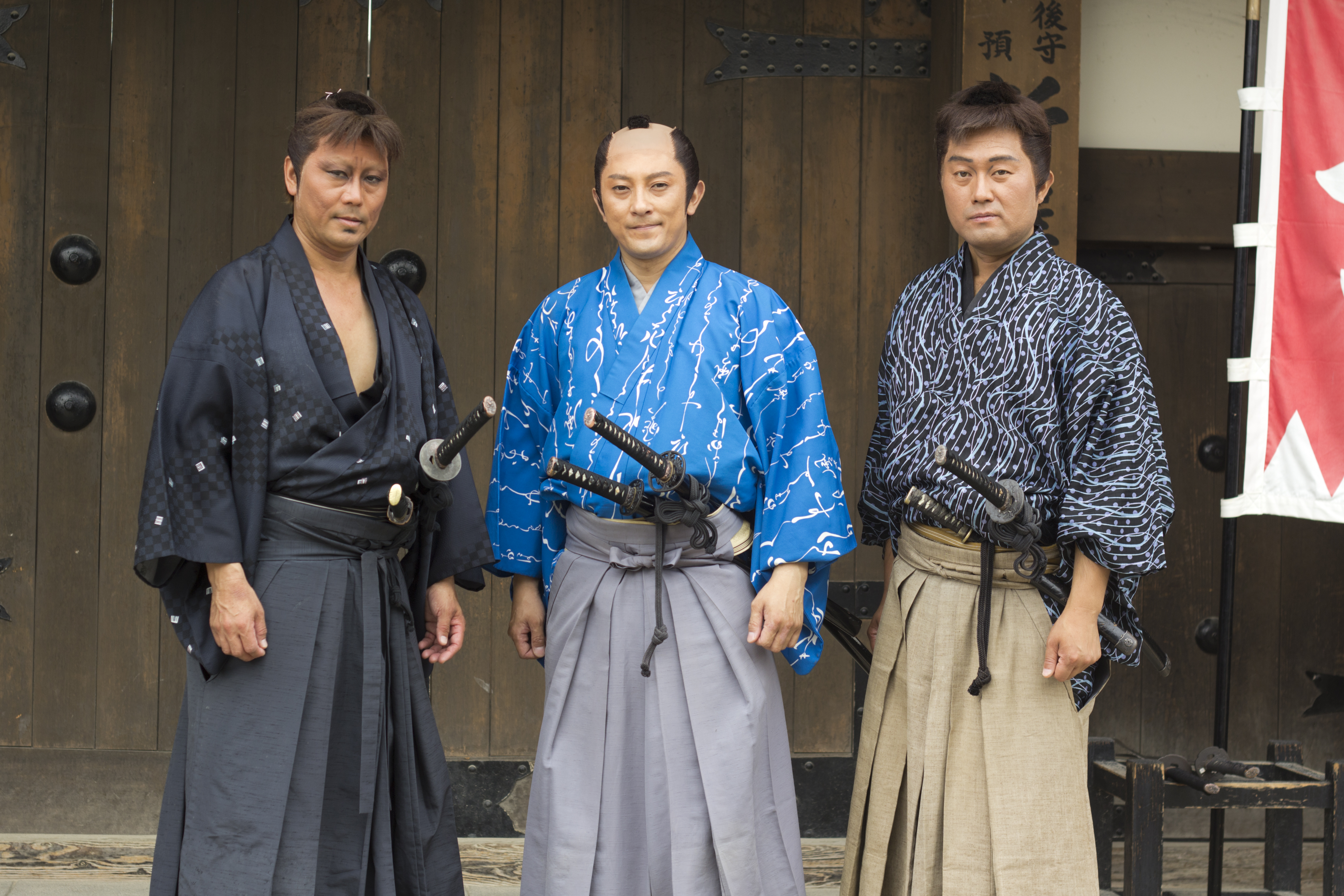
Actors in samurai costume at the Kyoto Eigamura film set

Costume is the distinctive style of dress and/or makeup of an individual or group that reflects class, gender, occupation, ethnicity, nationality, activity or epoch—in short, culture.

The term also was traditionally used to describe typical appropriate clothing for certain activities, such as riding costume, swimming costume, dance costume, and evening costume. Appropriate and acceptable costume is subject to changes in fashion and local cultural norms.

"But sable is worn more in carriages, lined with real lace over ivory satin, and worn over some smart costume suitable for an afternoon reception." A Woman's Letter from London (23 November 1899).

This general usage has gradually been replaced by the terms dress, attire, robes or wear and usage of costume has become more limited to unusual or out-of-date clothing and to attire intended to evoke a change in identity, such as theatrical, Halloween, and mascot costumes.

Before the advent of ready-to-wear apparel, clothing was made by hand. When made for commercial sale it was made, as late as the beginning of the 20th century, by costumiers, often women who ran businesses that met the demand for complicated or intimate female costume, including millinery and corsetry.

== Etymology ==
Derived from the Italian language and passed down through French, the term "costume" shares its origins with the word signifying fashion or custom. Variedly, the term "costume," indicating clothing exclusively from the eighteenth century onward, can be traced back to the Latin consuetudo, meaning "custom" or "usage."

== National costume ==
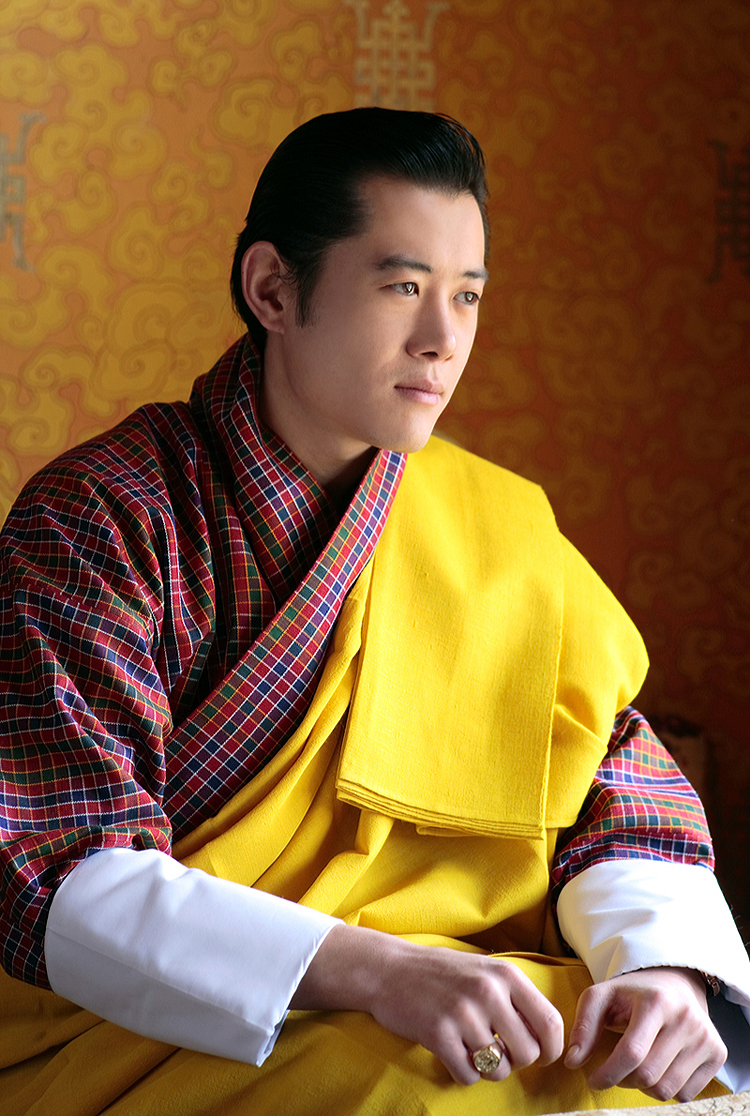
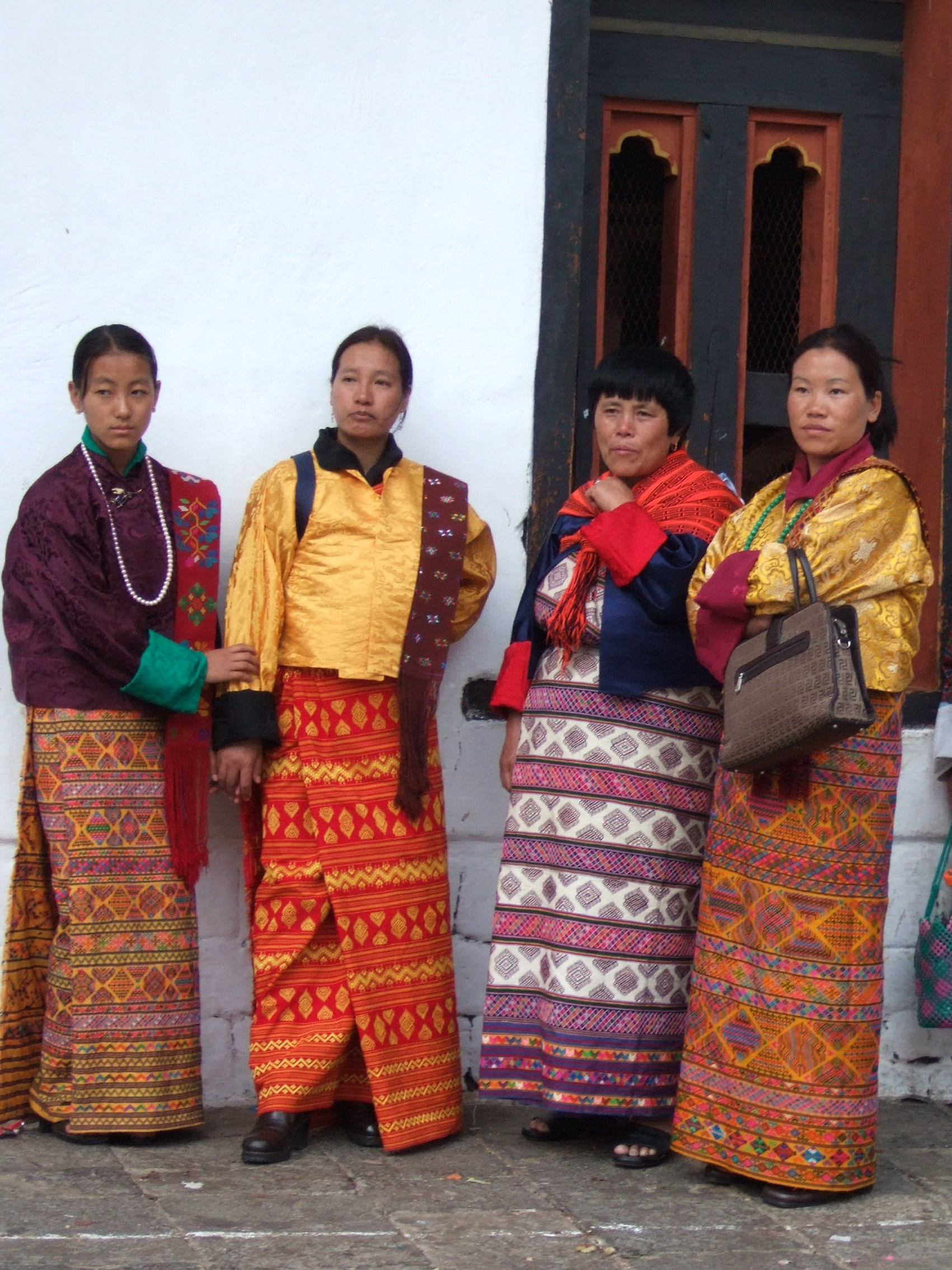
King of Bhutan in traditional dress and Bhutanese Women in traditional dress

National costume or regional costume expresses local (or exiled) identity and emphasizes a culture's unique attributes. They are often a source of national pride. Examples include the Scottish kilt, Turkish Zeybek, or Japanese kimono.

In Bhutan there is a traditional national dress prescribed for men and women, including the monarchy. These have been in vogue for thousands of years and have developed into a distinctive dress style. The dress worn by men is known as Gho which is a robe worn up to knee-length and is fastened at the waist by a band called the Kera. The front part of the dress which is formed like a pouch, in olden days was used to hold baskets of food and short dagger, but now it is used to keep cell phone, purse and the betel nut called Doma. The dress worn by women consist of three pieces known as Kira, Tego and Wonju. The long dress which extends up to the ankle is Kira. The jacket worn above this is Tego which is provided with Wonju, the inner jacket. However, while visiting the Dzong or monastery a long scarf or stoll, called Kabney is worn by men across the shoulder, in colours appropriate to their ranks. Women also wear scarfs or stolls called Rachus, made of raw silk with embroidery, over their shoulder but not indicative of their rank.

== Theatrical costume ==
Costume often refers to a particular style of clothing worn to portray the wearer as a character or type of character at a social event in a theatrical performance on the stage or in film or television. In combination with other aspects of stagecraft, theatrical costumes can help actors portray characters' and their contexts as well as communicate information about the historical period/era, geographic location and time of day, season or weather of the theatrical performance. Some stylized theatrical costumes, such as Harlequin and Pantaloon in the Commedia dell'arte, exaggerate an aspect of a character.

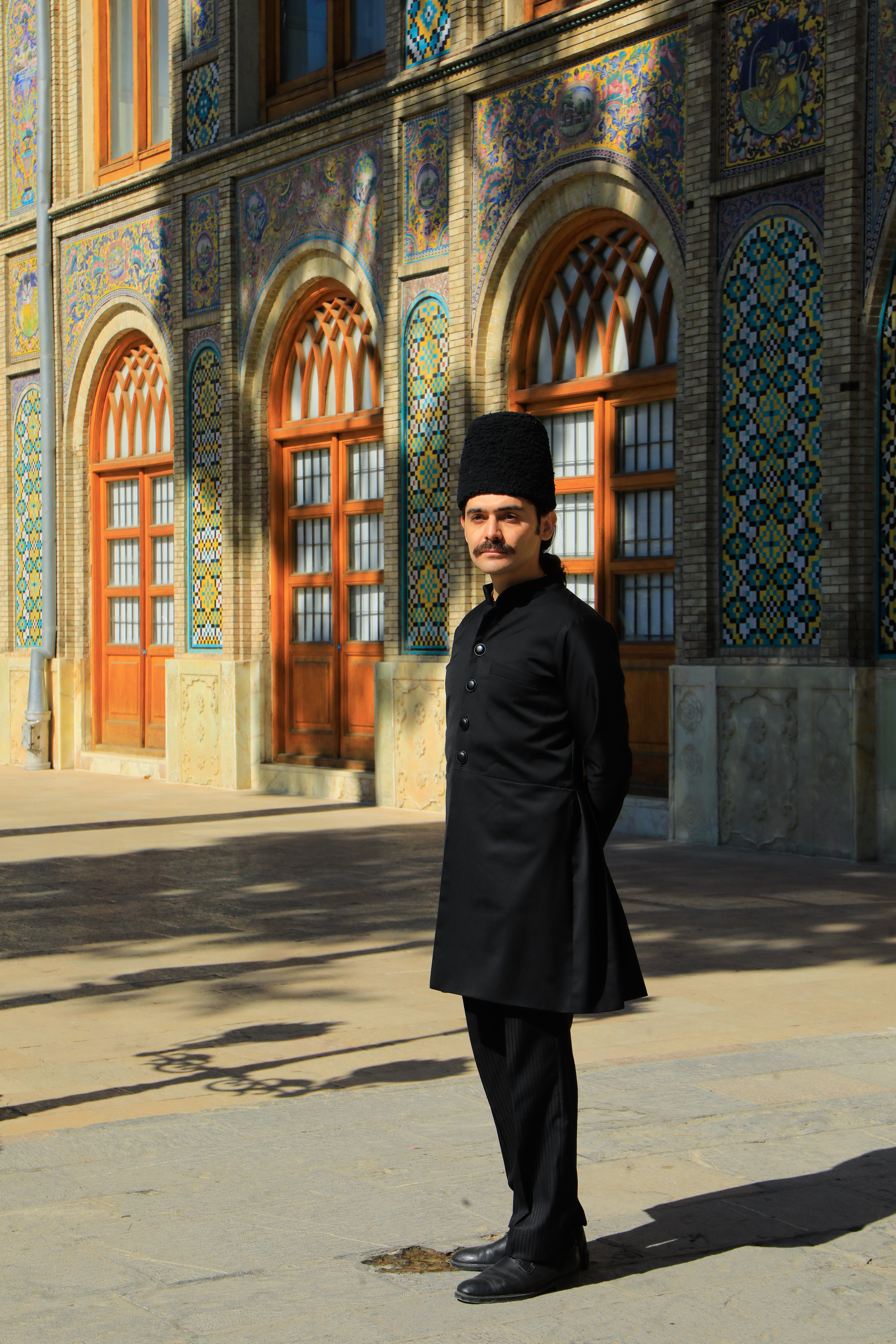
a tour guide in Golestan Palace, wearing 19th-century Qajar Persia costume

In the tourism industry, some tour guides may wear historical costumes in heritage sites or neighbourhoods, in order to enhance the quality of their tour. Such costumes range from those worn solo or by a group of guides.

== Costume construction ==
A costume technician is a term used for a person that constructs and/or alters the costumes. The costume technician is responsible for taking the two dimensional sketch and translating it to create a garment that resembles the designer's rendering. It is important for a technician to keep the ideas of the designer in mind when building the garment.

=== Draping and cutting ===
Draping is the art of manipulating fabric directly on a dress form or body form as the first step to create a pattern. A body form can be padded to a person's specific measurements. Flat drafting is the art of drawing patterns onto paper based on measurements to create a pattern.

Cutting is the act of tracing a pattern onto fabric and cutting out the pieces. These pieces are put together to create a final costume. In costuming, the person who creates a pattern is called a cutter/draper, and in fashion this person is more commonly called a pattern drafter, though both techniques may be used in both fields. Draping is especially useful with stretchy fabrics or bias cut garments as the maker can see how it will be affected by body curves and the pull of gravity.

== Jobs ==
Costume designer
Designs and creates a concept for the costumes for the play or performance.
Costume technician
Constructs and patterns the costumes for the play or performance.
Wardrobe supervisor
Oversees the wardrobe crew and run of the show from backstage. They are responsible for maintaining the good condition of the costumes.
Milliner
Also known as a hatmaker, responsible for the manufacturing of hats and headwear.

== Religious festivals ==
Wearing costumes is an important part of holidays developed from religious festivals such as Mardi Gras (in the lead up to Easter), and Halloween (related to All Hallow's Eve). Mardi Gras costumes usually take the form of jesters and other fantasy characters; Halloween costumes traditionally take the form of supernatural creatures such as ghosts, vampires, pop-culture icons and angels.

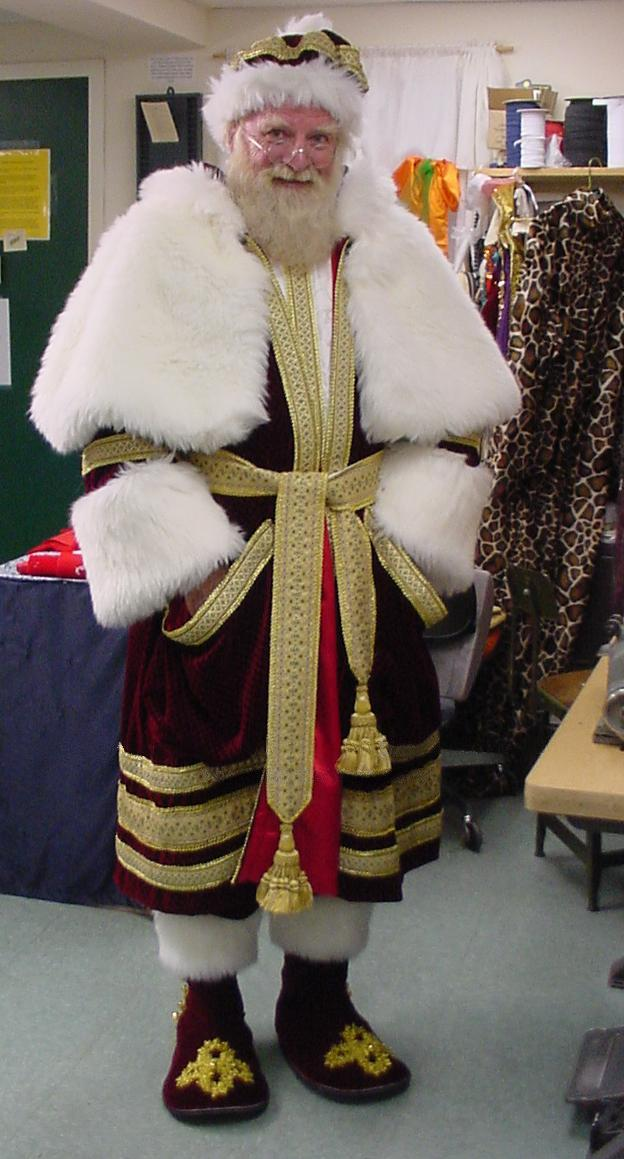
A traditional, European-style Santa suit

Halloween costumes developed from pre-Christian religious traditions: to avoid being terrorized by evil spirits walking the Earth during the harvest festival Samhain, the Celts donned disguises. In the eighth century, Pope Gregory VIII designated November 1 as All Saints Day, and the preceding days as All Hallows Eve; Samhain's costuming tradition was incorporated into these Christian holidays. Given the Catholic and pagan roots of the holiday, it has been repudiated by some Protestants. However, in the modern era, Halloween "is widely celebrated in almost every corner of American life," and the wearing of costumes forms part of a secular tradition. In 2022, United States households spent an average of $100 preparing for Halloween, with $34 going to costume-related spending.

Christmas costumes typically portray characters such as Santa Claus (developed from Saint Nicholas). In Australia, the United Kingdom and the United States the American version of a Santa suit and beard is popular; in the Netherlands, the costume of Zwarte Piet is customary. Easter costumes are associated with the Easter Bunny or other animal costumes.

In Judaism, a common practice is to dress up on Purim. During this holiday, Jews celebrate the change of their destiny. They were delivered from being the victims of an evil decree against them and were instead allowed by the King to destroy their enemies. A quote from the Book of Esther, which says: "On the contrary" (Hebrew: ונהפוך הוא) is the reason that wearing a costume has become customary for this holiday.

Buddhist religious festivals in Tibet, Bhutan, Mongolia and Lhasa and Sikkim in India perform the Cham dance, which is a popular dance form utilising masks and costumes.

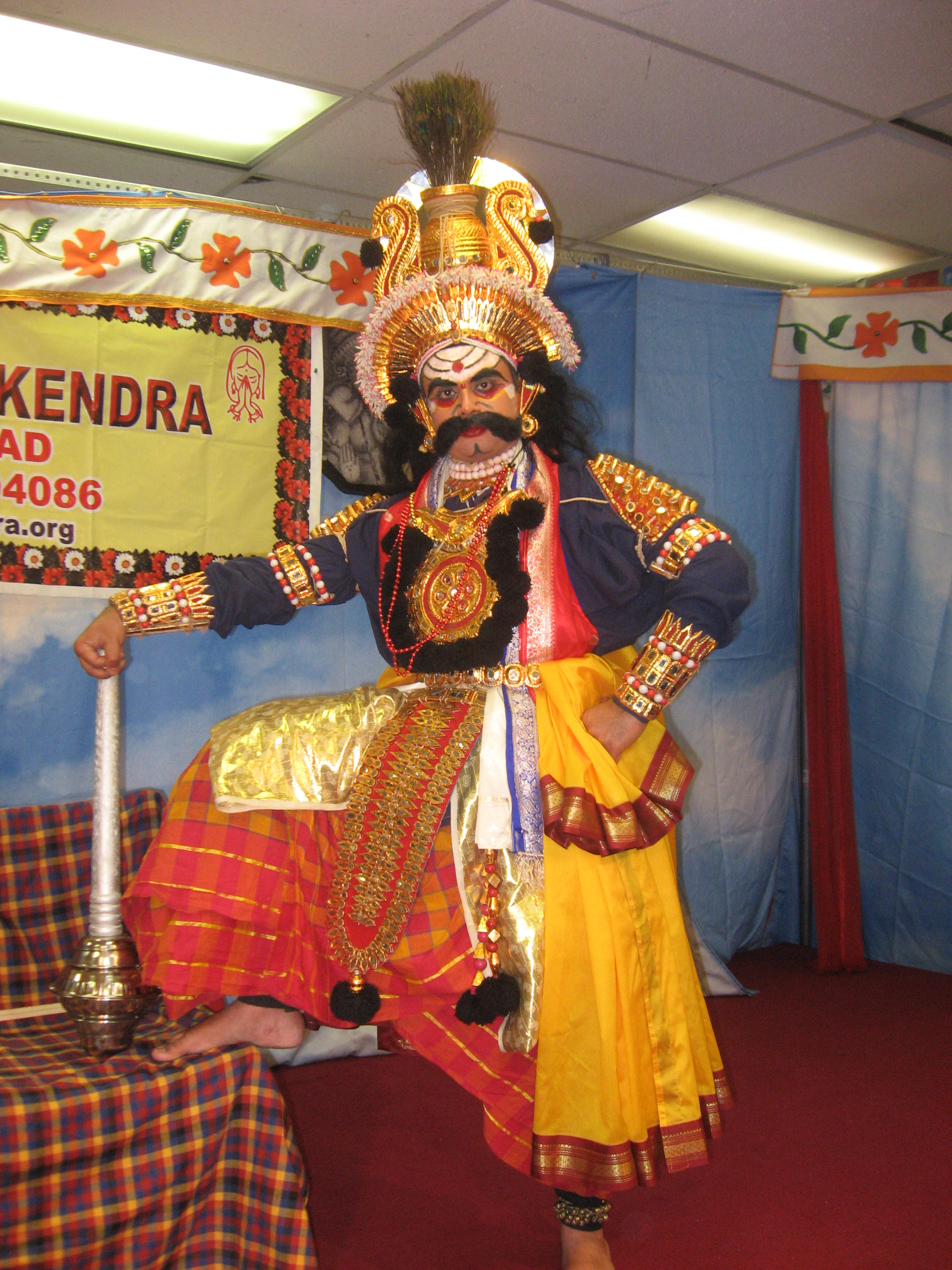
A costume used in yakshagana, a theater art from India

== Parades and processions ==
Parades and processions provide opportunities for people to dress up in historical or imaginative costumes. For example, in 1879 the artist Hans Makart designed costumes and scenery to celebrate the wedding anniversary of the Austro-Hungarian Emperor and Empress and led the people of Vienna in a costume parade that became a regular event until the mid-twentieth century. Uncle Sam costumes are worn on Independence Day in the United States. The Lion Dance, which is part of Chinese New Year celebrations, is performed in costume. Some costumes, such as the ones used in the Dragon Dance, need teams of people to create the required effect.

== Sporting events and parties ==
Public sporting events such as fun runs also provide opportunities for wearing costumes, as do private masquerade balls and fancy dress parties. Figure skating costumes are worn when a figure skater performs.

=== Mascots ===
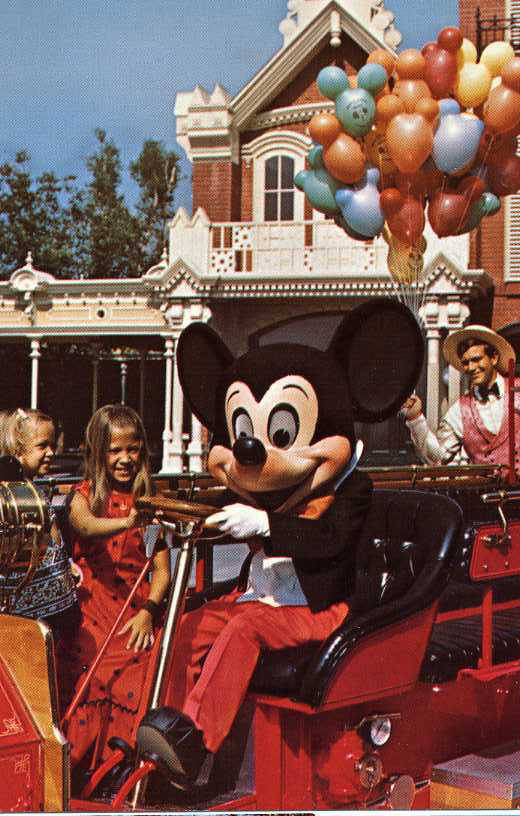
The Chief Firemouse, Mickey Mouse, Disney World (NBY 8235)

Costumes are popularly employed at sporting events, during which fans dress as their team's representative mascot to show their support. Businesses use mascot costumes to bring in people to their business either by placing their mascot in the street by their business or sending their mascot out to sporting events, festivals, national celebrations, fairs, and parades. Mascots appear at organizations wanting to raise awareness of their work. Children's Book authors create mascots from the main character to present at their book signings. Animal costumes that are visually very similar to mascot costumes are also popular among the members of the furry fandom, where the costumes are referred to as fursuits and match one's animal persona, or "fursona".

=== Children ===
Costumes also serve as an avenue for children to explore and role-play. For example, children may dress up as characters from history or fiction, such as pirates, princesses, cowboys, or superheroes. They may also dress in uniforms used in common jobs, such as nurses, police officers, or firefighters, or as zoo or farm animals. Young boys tend to prefer costumes that reinforce stereotypical ideas of being male, and young girls tend to prefer costumes that reinforce stereotypical ideas of being female.

=== Cosplay ===
Cosplay, a word of Japanese origin that in English is short for "costume display" or "costume play", is a performance art in which participants wear costumes and accessories to represent a specific character or idea that is usually always identified with a unique name (as opposed to a generic word). These costume wearers often interact to create a subculture centered on role play, so they can be seen most often in play groups, or at a gathering or convention. A significant number of these costumes are homemade and unique, and depend on the character, idea, or object the costume wearer is attempting to imitate or represent. The costumes themselves are often artistically judged to how well they represent the subject or object that the costume wearer is attempting to contrive.

== Design ==
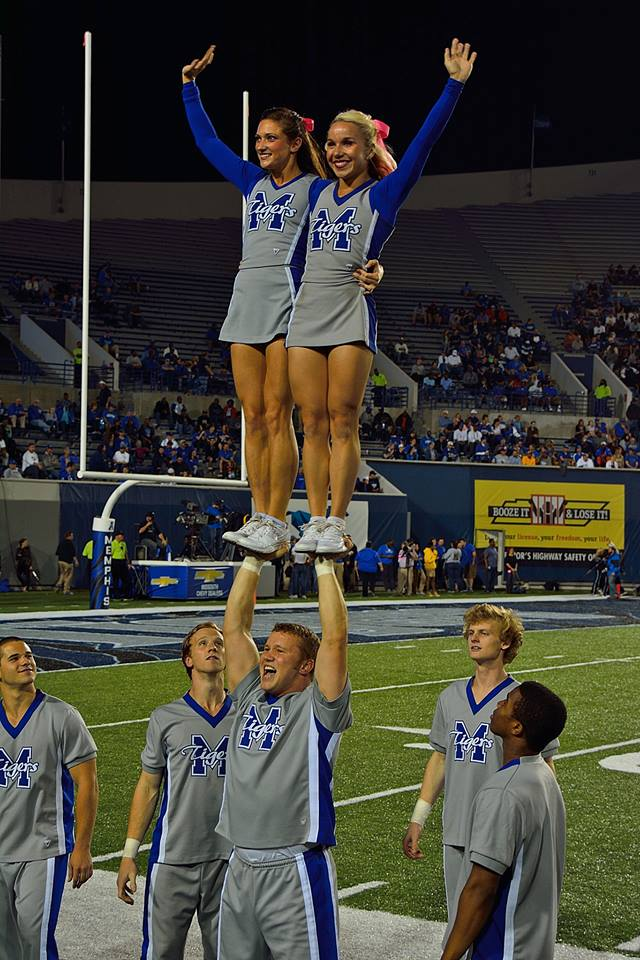
A U.S. university's cheerleading group at a performance, wearing costume as per their gender.

Costume design is the envisioning of clothing and the overall appearance of a character or performer. Costume may refer to the style of dress particular to a nation, a class, or a period. In many cases, it may contribute to the fullness of the artistic, visual world that is unique to a particular theatrical or cinematic production. The most basic designs are produced to denote status, provide protection or modesty, or provide visual interest to a character. Costumes may be for, but not limited to, theater, cinema, or musical performances. Costume design should not be confused with costume coordination, which merely involves altering existing clothing, although both processes are used to create stage clothes.

=== Organizations ===
The Costume Designers Guild's international membership includes motion picture, television, and commercial costume designers, assistant costume designers and costume illustrators, and totals over 750 members.

The National Costumers Association is an 80 year old association of professional costumers and costume shops.

=== Publications ===
The Costume Designer is a quarterly magazine devoted to the costume design industry.

=== Notable designers and awards ===
Notable costume designers include recipients of the Academy Award for Best Costume Design, Tony Award for Best Costume Design, and Drama Desk Award for Outstanding Costume Design. Edith Head and Orry-Kelly, both of whom were born late in 1897, were two of Hollywood's most notable costume designers.

== Industry ==
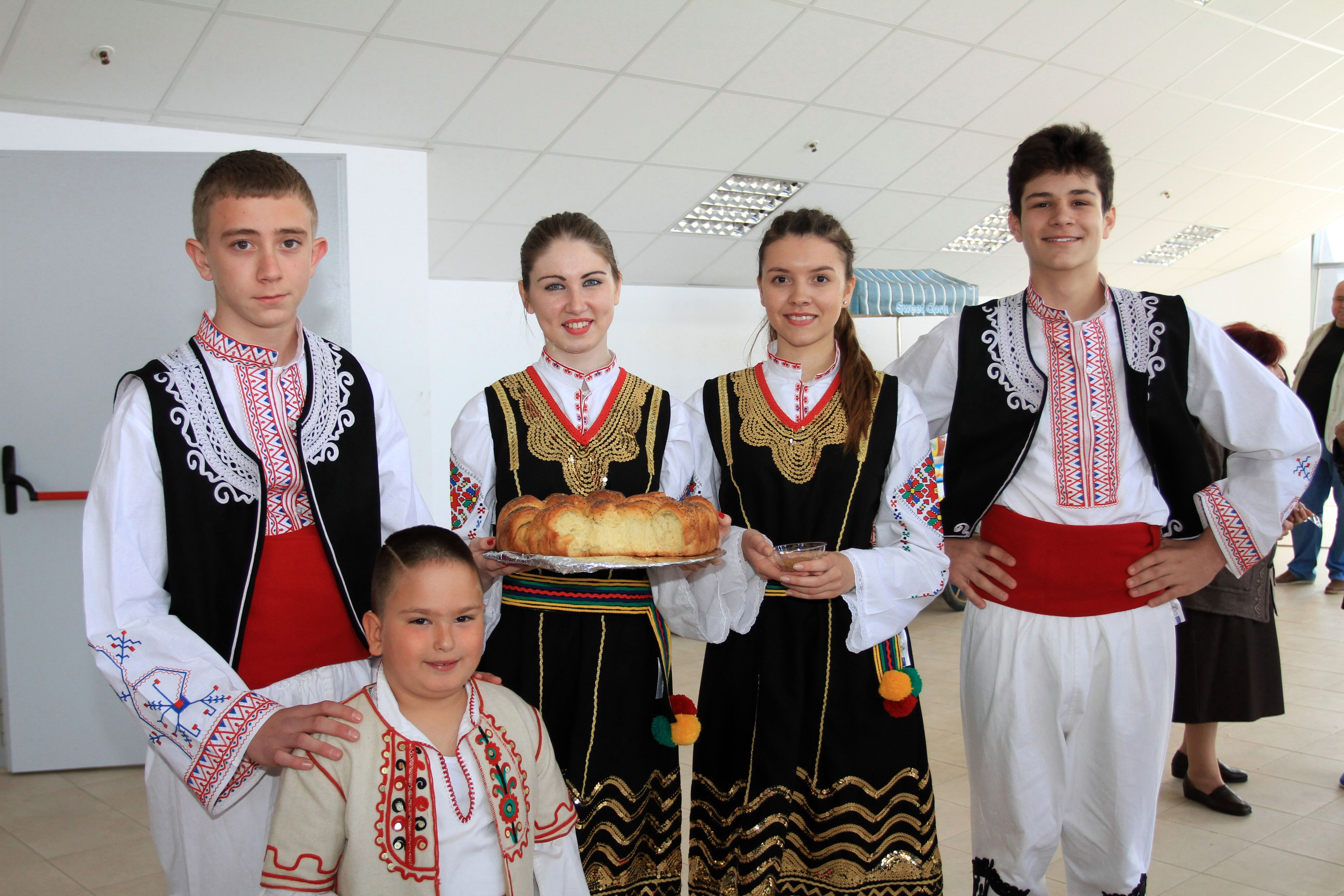
Children in Bulgarian national costumes welcome guests during the Folklore Festival, Slivnitsa, Bulgaria.

Professional-grade costumes are typically designed and produced by costume companies who can design and create unique costumes. These companies have often been in business for over 100 years, and continue to work with individual clients to create professional quality costumes.

Professional costume houses rent and sell costumes for the trade. This includes companies that create mascots, costumes for film, TV costumes and theatrical costumes.

Larger costume companies have warehouses full of costumes for rental to customers.

There is an industry where costumers work with clients and design costumes from scratch. They then will create original costumes specifically to the clients specifications.

== See also ==
- Best Costume Design
- Costumed character
- Costume drama
- Costume jewelry
- Costume museum
- Dress code
- Illusion costume
- List of costume designers
- Uniform
- World Costume Festival
- Mascot
