= 45th Bangladesh National Film Awards =

National Film Awards, Bangladesh

- Awarded for: Best of Bangladeshi cinema in 2020
- Awarded by: President of Bangladesh
- Presented by: Ministry of Information
- Announced on: 16 February 2022
- Presented on: 23 March 2022

Highlights
- Best Feature Film: Gor (The Grave); Bishwoshundori
- Best Actor: Siam Ahmed
- Best Actress: Deepanwita Martin
- Lifetime achievement: Anwara Begum; Raisul Islam Asad
- Most awards: Gor (The Grave) (11)

The 45th National Film Awards were presented on 23 March 2022 by Ministry of Information, Bangladesh to felicitate the best of Bangladeshi films released in the calendar year 2020. The list of winners were declared on 16 February 2022.

== Submissions ==
The deadline for submitting films for the National Film Award 2020 was on 19 September 2021. 14 full-length feature films, 7 short films and 6 documentaries were submitted.

== Lifetime Achievement ==
Award	Winner(s)	Awarded As
Lifetime Achievement	Anwara Begum	Actor
Lifetime Achievement	Raisul Islam Asad	Actor

== List of winners ==
Award	Winner(s)	Film
Best Film	Gazi Rakayet and Faridur Reza Sagar; Anjan Chowdhury	Gor (The Grave); Bishwoshundori
Best Short Film	Jannatul Ferdaus	Aarong
Best Documentary Film	Syed Ashik Rahman	Bangabandhur Rajnoitik Jibon o Bangladesher Obbhyudoy
Best Director	Gazi Rakayet	Gor (The Grave)
Best Actor	Siam Ahmed	Bishwoshundori
Best Actress	Deepanwita Martin	Gor (The Grave)
Best Supporting Actor	Fazlur Rahman Babu	Bishwoshundori
Best Supporting Actress	Aparna Ghosh	Gondi
Best Actor/Actress in Negative Role	Misha Sawdagor	Bir
Best Child Artist	Mugdhota Morshed Wriddhi	Gondi
Best Child Artist in Special Category	Md Shahadat Hasan Badhon	Aarong
Best Music Director	Belal Khan	Hridoy Jurey
Best Dance Director	Md Shahidur Rahman	Bishwoshundori
Best Male Playback Singer	Imran Mahmudul	Bishwoshundori
Best Female Playback Singer	Dilshad Nahar Kona; Konal	Bishwoshundori; Bir
Best Lyrics	Kabir Bakul	Bishwoshundori
Best Music Composer	Imran Mahmudul	Bishwoshundori
Best Story	Gazi Rakayet	Gor (The Grave)
Best Screenplay	Gazi Rakayet	Gor (The Grave)
Best Dialogue	Fakhrul Arefeen Khan	Gondi
Best Editing	Shariful Islam	Gor (The Grave)
Best Art Direction	Uttam Guho	Gor (The Grave)
Best Cinematography	Pankaj Palit and Mahbub Ullah Niaz	Gor (The Grave)
Best Sound Recording	Kazi Selim Ahmed	Gor (The Grave)
Best Costume Design	Enamtara Begum	Gor (The Grave)
Best Makeup	Mohammad Ali Babul	Gor (The Grave)
