= List of costume designers =

Artistic designer list

Costume designers are a handful of artistic designers, whose personal and artistic choices determine the outcome of the overall visual look of a stage, film or television production.

== Theater ==
- Theoni V. Aldredge: Annie, Barnum, A Chorus Line
- Gregg Barnes: Dirty Rotten Scoundrels
- Willy Clarkson: designed costumes for London's West End theatre
- Ann Curtis: Jekyll & Hyde
- Gregory Gale: Urinetown, The Wedding Singer
- Jane Greenwood: The Scarlet Pimpernel, Once Upon a Mattress
- Tim Hatley: Spamalot, Shrek
- Desmond Heeley: Brigadoon
- Susan Hilferty: Wicked, Spring Awakening
- Ann Hould-Ward: Beauty and the Beast, Dance of the Vampires
- Eiko Ishioka: Spider-Man: Turn Off the Dark
- Toni-Leslie James: Jelly's Last Jam, Footloose
- Willa Kim: The Will Rogers Follies
- William Ivey Long: The Producers, Chicago
- Santo Loquasto: Fosse, Ragtime
- Bob Mackie: On the Town
- Hayden Ng: designed costumes for many Singapore's theatre productions
- Ann Roth: Assassins
- Julie Taymor: The Lion King
- Valentina: The Philadelphia Story
- Jennifer von Mayrhauser: Rabbit Hole, Talley's Folly, The Heidi Chronicles

== Film and television ==
- Anaita Shroff Adajania: Love Aaj Kal, Dhoom 2
- Dolly Ahluwalia: Bajatey Raho, Bhaag Milkha Bhaag, Love Aaj Kal
- Bhanu Athaiya: Gandhi, Pyaasa, C.I.D. (won Oscar for Gandhi)
- Colleen Atwood: Chicago, Memoirs of a Geisha, Alice in Wonderland
- Cecil Beaton: My Fair Lady, Gigi
- Jenny Beavan: Howards End, Sense and Sensibility
- Kelly-Anne Bonieux: North of Albany, Richelieu, Humanist Vampire Seeking Consenting Suicidal Person
- Milena Canonero: A Clockwork Orange, The Godfather Part III, Marie Antoinette
- Ruth E. Carter: Black Panther, Selma, The Butler, Sparkle, Bamboozled, Rosewood, Crooklyn, What's Love Got to Do with It, Do the Right Thing, School Daze
- Oleg Cassini: The Razor's Edge, The Ghost and Mrs. Muir, The Mating Season
- Kanak Chapa Chakma: Jonakir Alo
- Phyllis Dalton: Doctor Zhivago, The Princess Bride, Oliver!
- Ngila Dickson: The Lord of the Rings: The Return of the King, The Last Samurai
- Danilo Donati: Romeo and Juliet
- Jean-Pierre Dorleac: Somewhere in Time, The Blue Lagoon, Battlestar Galactica, Buck Rogers in the 25th Century, Heart and Souls, Quantum Leap
- James Galanos: Oh Dad, Poor Dad, Mamma's Hung You in the Closet and I'm Feelin' So Sad, Never Wave at a WAC, Ginger in the Morning
- Adrian Greenburg: The Wizard of Oz, Marie Antoinette
- Julie Harris: Darling, A Hard Day's Night, Goodbye, Mr. Chips, The Slipper and the Rose
- Edith Head: Sabrina, The Sting, Lady in the Dark, The Emperor Waltz, The Hurricane
- Dorothy Jeakins: The Sound of Music
- Karan Johar: Kal Ho Naa Ho, Kabhi Alvida Naa Kehna
- Wahida Mollick Jolly: Mrittika Maya
- Simple Kapadia: Rudaali
- Niharika Khan: Bhootnath, The Dirty Picture, Karthik Calling Karthik
- Michelle Laine: Archenemy
- Jean Louis: From Here to Eternity
- Neeta Lulla: Aur Pyaar Ho Gaya
- Manish Malhotra: Tashan
- Deborah Nadoolman: Raiders of the Lost Ark, The Three Amigos, Michael Jackson's Thriller
- Mike O'Neill: The Damned United, North & South, I.D., Prime Suspect
- Orry-Kelly: An American in Paris, Some Like It Hot, Gypsy
- Walter Plunkett: Gone with the Wind, Singin' in the Rain
- Sandy Powell: The Wings of the Dove, Shakespeare in Love
- Ann Roth: The English Patient
- Bibi Russell: Mrittika Maya
- Kazuhiro Sawataishi: 13 Assassins
- Irene Sharaff: Call Me Madam, Guys and Dolls
- William Travilla: How to Marry a Millionaire
- Theadora van Runkle: Bonnie and Clyde
- Jennifer von Mayrhauser: The Hand That Rocks the Cradle, The Private Lives of Pippa Lee
- Hazel Webb-Crozier: Mickybo and Me, Closing the Ring, Your Highness
- Shimul Yusuf: Guerrilla

== Theatre and opera ==
- Madeleine Boyd: Pelléas et Mélisande, Orfeo ed Euridice, La Gazzetta, Partenope, Peter Grimes, La scala di seta
- Tilly Grimes: theatre, opera, and film

== Others ==
- Calico Cooper: designed costumes for Alice Cooper tours, and currently designs for her performances in the band Beasto Blanco
- India Ferrah
- Steve Summers: costume designer for Dolly Parton

== See also ==
- Costume design
- Filmmaking
- List of film formats
- List of motion picture-related topics
