= Bangladesh National Film Award for Best Costume Design =

Bengali film award

National Film Award for Best Costume Design জাতীয় চলচ্চিত্র পুরস্কার শ্রেষ্ঠ পোশাক ও সাজসজ্জা
- Awarded for: Excellence in cinematic achievements for Bangladeshi cinema for the best Choreography category
- Location: Dhaka
- Country: Bangladesh
- Presented by: President of Bangladesh, Prime Minister of Bangladesh
- First award: 2008
- Final award: 2015
- Currently held by: Muskan SumaikaPadma Patar Jol
- Website: moi.gov.bd

The Bangladesh National Film Award for Best Costume Design (Bengali: বাংলাদেশ জাতীয় চলচ্চিত্র পুরস্কার শ্রেষ্ঠ পোশাক ও সাজসজ্জা) is one of the highest film awards in Bangladesh. Since 2008, the awards have been given in the category of best choreography. The first award winner was Mohammad Shasmsul Islam. No awardees have since won multiple awards in this category. Females have taken 5 out of all 8 awards given in this category.

== List of winners ==
Year	Name of Winner	Film	Notes
2008	Mohammad Shamsul Islam	Megher Koley Rod	
2009	Dilip Singh	Gongajatra	
2010	Bibi Russell	Moner Manush	
2011	Shimul Yousuf	Guerrilla	
2012	S.M. Mainuddin	Ghetuputro Komola	
2013	Wahida Mollick Jolly	Mrittika Maya	
2014	Kanak Chapa Chakma	Jonakir Alo	
2015	Muskan Sumika	Padma Patar Jol	
2016	Sattar; Farjana Shan	Niyoti; Aynabaji	
2017	Rita Hossain	Tumi Robe Nirobe	
2018	Sadia Shabnam Shantu	Putro	
2019	Khondkar Sajia Afreen	Fagun Haway	
2020	Enamtara Begum	The Grave	
2021	Edila Farid Turin	Nonajoler Kabbo	
2022	Tansina Shawon	Shimu	
