= Deepanwita Martin =

Bangladeshi film actress

- দীপান্বিতা মার্টিন
- Occupation: Actress
- Years active: 2020–present

Rosalin Dipannita Martin, popularly known as Deepanwita Martin, is a Bangladeshi actress. She won the Bangladesh National Film Award for Best Actress for her role in the film Gor (The Grave) (2020).

== Criticism ==
Deepanwita Martin took a stand for the government during the repression of the dictatorship Awami League government on the students in the quota reform movement that took place in 2024. During the movement, a group of pro-autocracy Awami artists, including Deepanwita Martin, were active against the movement in a WhatsApp group called 'Alo Ashbei' led by actor Ferdous. After the non-cooperation movement, on 3 September, 2024, some screenshots related to that WhatsApp group were spread on social media. Due to the violence post the 2024 events, she relocated to Nepal.

== Filmography ==
=== Film ===
Year	Title	Role	Director	Notes	Ref.
2020	The Grave	Honufa	Gazi Rakayet		
2021	No Ground Beneath the Feet	Second wife	Mohammad Rabby Mridha		

== Accolades ==
Award	Date of Announcement	Category	Work	Results	Ref.
45th National Film Awards	15 February 2022	Best Actor in a Lead Role (Female)	The Grave	Won	
