= Chandan Sinha =

Bangladeshi playback singer

- চন্দন সিনহা
- Occupations: Playback singer, producer

Chandan Sinha is a Bangladeshi playback singer. He won Bangladesh National Film Award for Best Male Playback Singer twice for his performance in the films Purno Doirgho Prem Kahini (2013) and Hridita (2022). He was the producer of the sequel Purno Doirgho Prem Kahini 2.

== Early life ==
Sinha's grandfather was Nutan Chandra Singha. Sinha's father was Gaurang Sinha (d. 2015).

Chandan Sinha left home for Bollywood at a young age to pursue his dream of being a playback singer. He was unsuccessful there, so he returned home. He then came to the attention of Bangladesh Television (BTV) writer and director Abdullah al Mamun. Mamun used Sinha's voice in his television serial Shirsho Bindu.

== Awards ==
- Uro Binodon Bichitra Award for Drama Title of Joar Bhata (2003)
- Citycell-Channel i Music Award (2015)
