= Purno Doirgho Prem Kahini 2 =

Bangladeshi romantic sports drama film

- Theatrical Release Poster
- Directed by: Shafi Uddin Shafi
- Screenplay by: Rumman Rashid Khan
- Story by: Rumman Rashid Khan
- Produced by: Chandan Sinha
- Starring: Shakib Khan; Joya Ahsan; Emon; Moushumi Hamid
- Cinematography: Tapon Ahmed
- Music by: Showkat Ali Emon; Shahriyar Afsan Ovro; Kosik Hossion Taposh; Kabir Bakul; Sayeem Afran
- Distributed by: Friends Movies International
- Release date: 8 April 2016
- Country: Bangladesh
- Language: Bengali

Purno Doirgho Prem Kahini 2 (transl. Full-length Love Story 2) also known by the initialism as PDPK II, is a Bangladeshi romantic sports drama film directed by Shafi Uddin Shafi and produced by Chandan Sinha under the banner of Friends Movies International. The film features Shakib Khan, Joya Ahsan, Moushumi Hamid and Emon in lead roles and has played a negative role in this film in place of Arifin Shuvoo. The film was released on 8 April 2016, Upon release, the film received mixed to positive reviews from critics, eventually becoming one of the highest grossing Bengali film of 2016. The film is a sequel of 2013 film Purnodoirgho Prem Kahini.

== Cast ==
- Shakib Khan as Asad Ahmed
- Joya Ahsan as Mitu
- Emon as Rayan Khan
- Moushumi Hamid
- Omar Sani
- Sadek Bachchu
- Shirin Bokul
- Shahidul Alam Sachchu
- Johnny Hoque
- Gulshan Ara Ahmed
- Fardin Mahi
- Noor
- Johnny Haque
- Sazzad Hossain
- Sanko Panja
- Jae Mamun as
- Asif Akbar as special appearance
- Habibul Bashar as special appearance

== Production ==
=== Casting and development ===
The project was announced is 2014 after success of the first installment of the film. Khan portrays the role of a cricketer in the film while Joya Ahsan plays role of a ramp model. Producers of the film later announced that Arifin Shuvoo will not be seen in the film, while Mamnun Hasan Emon and Moushumi Hamid were added to the film. The filming began in Hatirjheel on 16 September 2014. The film was shot in Bangladesh and Malaysia. The film's logo was first revealed on 18 September 2015.

== Soundtrack ==
No.	Title	Singers	Length
1.	"Prem Korbo Ami Morbo"	Chandan Sinha, Dinat Jahan Munni	5:00
2.	"Toke Chara Bhalo Lagena"	Chandan Sinha	4:42
3.	"Tumi Chile Hridoy Er"	Kona, Tasif	4:00
4.	"Tor Hashi Jeno"	Asif Akbar	3:26
