= Muskan Sumika =

Bangladeshi costume designer

- মুসকান সুমাইকা
- Occupation: Costume designer
- Years active: 2015–present
- Notable work: Podmo Patar Jol
- Awards: National Film Awards (1st time)

Muskan Sumika is a Bangladeshi costume designer. He won the Bangladesh National Film Award for Best Costume Design for the film Podmo Patar Jol (2018).

== Filmography ==
- Podmo Patar Jol - 2015
- Rajneeti - 2017

== Awards and nominations ==
National Film Awards

Year	Award	Category	Film	Result
2015	National Film Award	Best Costume Design	Podmo Patar Jol	Won
