= Rumman Rashid Khan =

Bangladeshi scriptwriter, anchor, journalist

- রুম্মান রশীদ খান
- Occupations: Playwright, anchor. journalist
- Years active: 2009-present

Rumman Rashid Khan (রুম্মান রশীদ খান; born 11 July) is a Bangladeshi screenwriter, dramatist, television host, podcast host, and journalist. He is also the host of the "Behind the Fame with RRK" podcast on Maasranga Television.

He is known for writing the scripts for TV plays and films, such as Purnodoirgho Prem Kahini (2013), Bishwoshundori (2020) and hosting Ranga Shokal show on Maasranga TV. He has also worked as a feature writer for Samakal and Prothom Alo newspapers. To date, he has written about 100 one-hour tele-fictions and telefilms.

== Early life and education ==
Rumman Rashid Khan was born in Dhaka, Bangladesh. He finished his SSC exam from Ideal School & College, HSC from Notre Dame College, and did his MBA from East West University.

== Career ==
Rumman Rashid Khan started his career as a journalist at Prothom Alo. While working there, he met with Kabir Bakul. He made his TV debut with SMS, a tele-fiction aired in 2009. He made his debut as a film writer with Purnodoirgho Prem Kahini (2013), a romantic drama directed by Shafi Uddin Shafi and starring Shakib Khan and Joya Ahsan. The film was a commercial success and spawned a sequel, Purnodoirgho Prem Kahini 2 (2016), which was also written by Rumman Rashid Khan. His last film project was Bishwoshundori (2020), a musical drama directed by Chayanika Chowdhury and starring Siam Ahmed and Pori Moni.

He has been the producer of the talk show program Ranga Shokal on Masranga TV. He has also hosted other shows on the channel. Khan also works as a marketing consultant. He was behind the publicity for the film Debi and Nolok.
