= No Ground Beneath the Feet =

2021 Bangladeshi drama film

- Theatrical release poster
- Bengali: পায়ের তলায় মাটি নাই
- Literally: Payer Tolay Mati Nai
- Directed by: Mohammad Rabby Mridha
- Screenplay by: Mohammad Rabby Mridha; Nahar Mridha
- Story by: Fazla Rabby
- Produced by: Abu Shahed Emon
- Starring: Mostafa Monwar; Priyam Archi; Deepanwita Martin
- Cinematography: Manirul Islam; Tonmoy Sharif
- Edited by: Sameer Ahmed
- Music by: Emon Chowdhury
- Production companies: Golpo Rajjo Films; Impress Telefiline Limited; Batayan Productions
- Distributed by: Golpo Rajjo Films
- Release date: 7 October 2021 (BIFF)
- Running time: 90 mins
- Country: Bangladesh
- Language: Bengali

No Ground Beneath the Feet (Bengali: পায়ের তলায় মাটি নাই, romanized: Payer Tolay Mati Nai) is a 2021 Bangladeshi drama film directed by Mohammad Rabby Mridha (in his feature directorial debut) with a screenplay by Mohammad Rabby Mridha and Nahar Mridha from a story by Fazla Rabby. The film is produced by Bangladeshi filmmaker Abu Shahed Emon Starring Mostafa Monwar, the film depicts the life of Saiful, an impoverished ambulance driver in Dhaka. The film premiered at the 26th Busan International Film Festival in 'out of competition section' on 7 October 2021, and competed for Golden Peacock Award at the 52nd International Film Festival of India in November 2021.

The film was submitted for nomination in the Best International Feature Film category of the 96th Academy Awards, by the Oscar Committee as Bangladeshi entry, but, it didn't make it to the shortlist.

== Synopsis ==
Saiful an improvised ambulance driver migrated to Dhaka to earn a living for his family. His lust leads him to a second marriage with a woman he slept with and who now pesters him for money. His family and his brother all want his help but he cannot return home, and as time goes on the situation worsens.

== Cast ==
- Mostafa Monwar as Saiful
- Priyam Archi as Mina, first wife
- Deepanwita Martin as second wife

== Release ==
The film had its premiere at the 26th Busan International Film Festival in out of competition section on 7 October 2021. It competed for Golden Peacock Award at the 52nd International Film Festival of India in November 2021. In March 2022, it was screened at the 17th Osaka Asian Film Festival on 13 March 2022.

The film made it to Red Lotus Asian Film Festival Vienna, where it was screened in May 2022. On 25 June 2022, it was screened at London Indian Film Festival in Ciné Lumière.

The film was screened at the Asian Film Festival Barcelona on 4 November 2022.

=== OTT release ===
After being screened at various international film festivals, the film was released on the OTT platform iScreen on 30 May 2026, coinciding with Eid al-Adha.

== Reception ==
Panos Kotzathanasis reviewing for Asian Movie Pulse praised direction, cinematography and performance of actors. He commended cinematography writing, "Manirul Islam and Abu Raihan’s cinematography is on a very high level." For directions, he opined, "Mohammad Rabby Mridha manages to direct a film that, despite its documentary-like realism." Praising lead actor Mostafa Monwar, he wrote, "Monwar's measured acting as Saiful, is another great performance by him. Kotzathanasis concluded, "No Ground Beneath the Feet is a great movie, a rather hopeful debut, and a testament to the progress of Bangladeshi cinema."

== Awards and nominations ==
Year	Award ceremony	Category	Recipient/ Nominee(s)	Result	Ref.
2021	52nd International Film Festival of India	Golden Peacock Award	No Ground Beneath the Feet	Nominated	

== See also ==
- List of submissions to the 96th Academy Awards for Best International Feature Film
- List of Bangladeshi submissions for the Academy Award for Best International Feature Film
