= Illusion costume =

Fancy dress costume

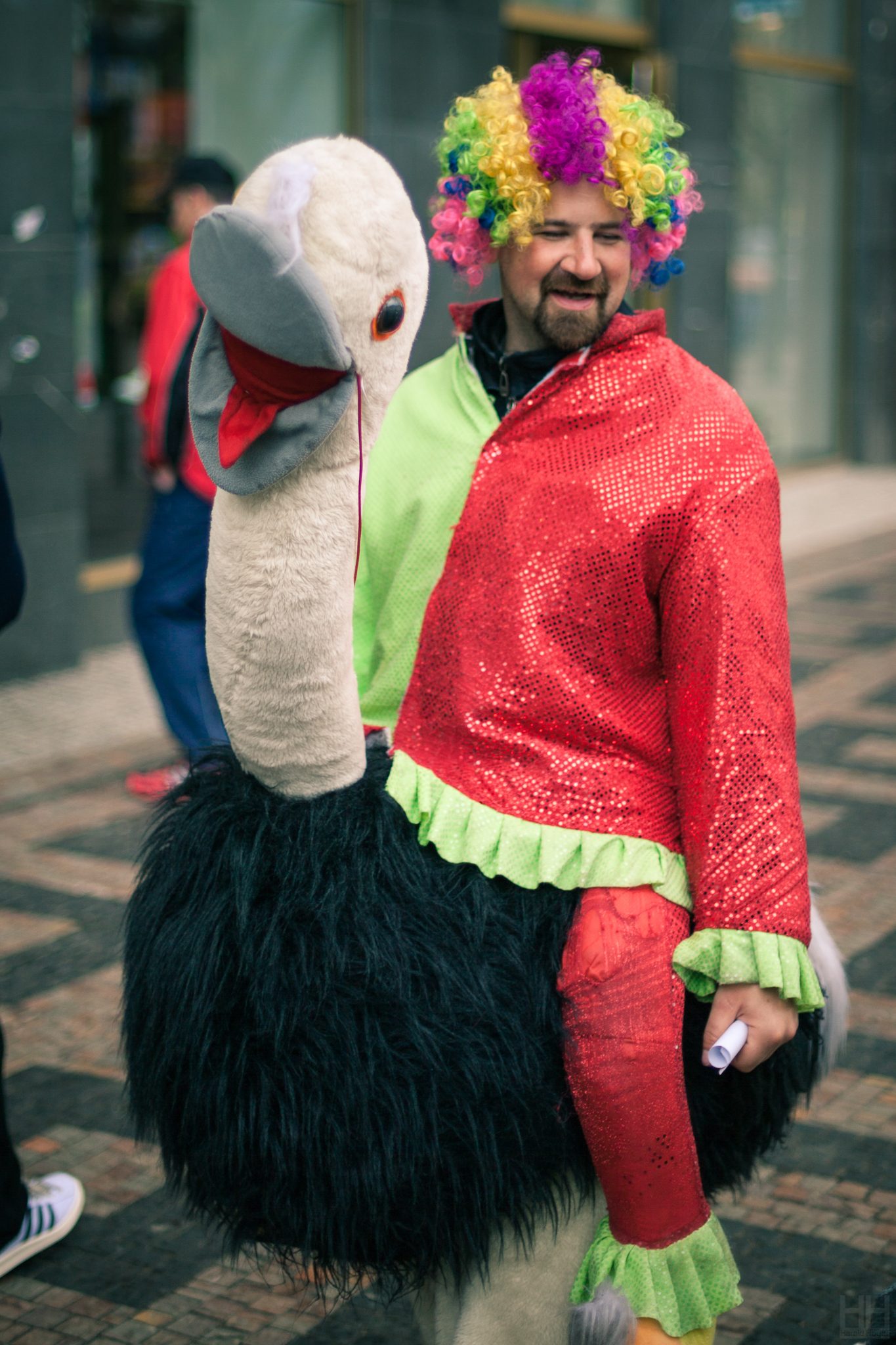
A person wearing an "ostrich rider" costume

An illusion costume is a costume that fools the eyes by making it seem that the person in the costume is riding an animal, being held by another person (which is part of the costume), or many other things. The most common is the rider, in which the "rider" (person) gives the illusion of riding an animal; the person's legs go through the hollowed-out animal legs, along with fake legs dangling off the wearer's body to finish off the illusion.
