= Best Costume Design =

Best Costume Design is the name of an award which is presented by various film, television and theatre organizations, festivals, and people's awards. It may refer to:

- AACTA Award for Best Costume Design
- Academy Award for Best Costume Design
- Africa Movie Academy Award for Best Costume Design
- ARY Film Award for Best Costume Design
- Asian Film Award for Best Costume Design
- BAFTA Award for Best Costume Design
- Bangladesh National Film Award for Best Costume Design
- Bollywood Movie Award – Best Costume Designer
- British Academy Television Craft Award for Best Costume Design
- British Independent Film Award for Best Costume Design
- Canadian Screen Award for Best Costume Design
- César Award for Best Costume Design
- Costume Designers Guild Awards
  - Costume Designers Guild Award for Best Costume Design – Contemporary TV Series
  - Costume Designers Guild Award for Best Costume Design – Period or Fantasy TV Series
- Critics' Choice Movie Award for Best Costume Design
- Czech Lion Award for Best Costume Design
- European Film Award for Best Costume Designer
- Filmfare Award for Best Costume Design
  - Filmfare Award for Best Costume Design – Marathi
- Gaumee Film Award for Best Costume Design
- Genie Award for Best Achievement in Costume Design
- Guldbagge Award for Best Costume Design
- Golden Arena for Best Costume Design
- Goya Award for Best Costume Design
- IIFA Award for Best Costume Design
- Laurence Olivier Award for Best Costume Design
- Magritte Award for Best Costume Design
- Maharashtra State Film Award for Best Costume Design
- Nandi Award for Best Costume Designer
- National Film Award for Best Costume Design
- Online Film Critics Society Award for Best Costume Design
- Polish Academy Award for Best Costume Design
- Prix Iris for Best Costume Design
- Producers Guild Film Award for Best Costume Design
- Robert Award for Best Costume Design
- Satellite Award for Best Costume Design
- Saturn Award for Best Costume Design
- Screen Award for Best Costume Design
- Tony Award for Best Costume Design
  - Tony Award for Best Costume Design in a Musical
  - Tony Award for Best Costume Design in a Play
- Vijay Award for Best Costume Designer
- Zee Cine Award for Best Costume Design

== See also ==
- Bollywood Movie Award – Best Costume Designer
- Hong Kong Film Award for Best Costume Make Up Design
- Kerala State Film Award for Best Costume Designer
- Nandi Award for Best Costume Designer
- Tamil Nadu State Film Award for Best Costume Designer
- Vijay Award for Best Costume Designer
- Zee Cine Award for Best Costume Designer
