= Jalal's Story =

Bangladeshi film

- Film poster
- Directed by: Abu Shahed Emon
- Produced by: Faridur Reza Sagar
- Starring: Arafat Rahman; Tauquir Ahmed; Mosharraf Karim; Moushumi Hamid; Shormi Mala; Mohammad Emon
- Cinematography: Barkat Hossain Polash
- Edited by: Abu Shahed Emon
- Release dates: 5 October 2014 (South Korea); 4 September 2015 (Bangladesh)
- Running time: 121 minutes
- Country: Bangladesh
- Language: Bengali

Jalal's Story (Bengali: জালালের গল্প) is a 2014 Bangladeshi film directed by Abu Shahed Emon and produced by Faridur Reza Sagar. Character actors Arafat Rahman and Mohammad Emon play the lead roles. The film was selected as the Bangladeshi entry for the Best Foreign Language Film at the 88th Academy Awards, but it was not nominated.

== Plot ==
Just as Moses was found in the river Nile, an infant is rescued from a river, and adopted by Miraj, Karim and Sajib in turns over the years, only to be abandoned at the various stages of his life. From innocence to becoming a gangster, the unpredictable currents of Jalal's journey prove that he is truly a child of the river.

== Cast ==
- Arafat Rahman as Jalal (aged 20)
- Tauquir Ahmed as Karim
- Nur A Alam Nayon as Miraj
- Mitali Das as Marium
- Akter Ahmed as Monir
- Mosharraf Karim as Sajib
- Moushumi Hamid as Shila
- Mohammad Emon as Jalal (age 9)

== Awards ==
Year	Category	Institution or publication	Result	Notes	Ref.
2014	New Current	Busan International Film Festival	Nominated		
2016	Best Film	19th Avanca International Film Festival	Won		

== See also ==
- List of submissions to the 88th Academy Awards for Best Foreign Language Film
- List of Bangladeshi submissions for the Academy Award for Best Foreign Language Film
