= Abu Shahed Emon =

Bangladeshi filmmaker

- আবু শাহেদ ইমন
- Born: Takerghat, Sunamganj District, Bangladesh
- Education: University of Dhaka (B.Sc.), University of Wisconsin–La Crosse, Sydney Film School, Royal Melbourne Institute of Technology, Korea National University of Arts (MFA)
- Occupations: Film director, film producer
- Years active: 2012–present
- Notable work: Jalal's Story; Sincerely Yours, Dhaka; No Ground Beneath the Feet

Abu Shahed Emon is a Bangladeshi film director and producer.

== Early life and education ==
Emon was born in the village of Takerghat, Sunamganj District, Bangladesh. He pursued a bachelor's degree in psychology at University of Dhaka. He developed interest for filmmaking during his involvement with the Dhaka University Film Society, which he would later further study filmmaking at the University of Wisconsin–La Crosse, Sydney Film School. and Royal Melbourne Institute of Technology (RMIT) in Australia. Later he completed his Master in Fine Arts (MFA) from School of Film, TV and Multimedia Korea National University of Arts

== Career ==
Emon directed his debut film, Jalal's Story. The film was premiered in the New Currents Competition of Busan International Film Festival, and appeared as Bangladesh's Oscars award submission 88th Academy Award in 2016. He produced Sincerely Yours, Dhaka, and No Ground Beneath the Feet. The Bangladesh Oscar Committee selected the anthology film Sincerely Yours, Dhaka as Bangladesh's submission for the International Feature Film category at the 93rd Academy award 2021 Oscars. The film No Ground Beneath the Feet, produced by Emon, was submitted as Bangladesh's entry for the Best International Feature Film category at the 96th Academy Award, also known as the 2023 Oscars.

Emon written and directed the web series, Mercules for Bangladeshi streaming platform Chorki and also produced an anthology series Bagh Bondi Shingho Bondi for Bangladeshi streaming platform Binge and directed one episode titled Arai Mon Shopno (2020) Emon directed a Japanese-language short film Tenement of Secret Talk, which was showcased in several Japanese film festivals. He served as the project director for the Bengali dubbed version of the Korean animation series "Teenie Scouts: Big Five," which on-aired on Bangladeshi Satellite channel Channel I and iscreen.

== Filmography ==
Year	Title	Role	Notes
2012	The Container	Producer/Writer/Director	Short film
2014	Jalal's Story	Writer/Director/Editor	Feature film
2018	Sincerely Yours, Dhaka	Creative Producer	Feature film
2020	Arai Mon Shopno	Producer/Writer/Director	Short Film
2021	No Ground Beneath the Feet	Producer	Feature film
2022	Paap Punno	Creative Producer	Feature film
2022	Damal	Creative producer	Feature film
2023	Roktojoba	Creative producer	Feature film
2023	A House with No Names	Producer	Feature film
2023	Mercules	Writer/Director/Co-Producer	Web Series
2024	Tenement of Secret Talk	Director	Japanese short film
2025	Jaya Aar Sharmin	Producer	Feature film
