= Moushumi Hamid =

Bangladeshi actress and model

Mousumi Hamid
- মৌসুমী হামিদ
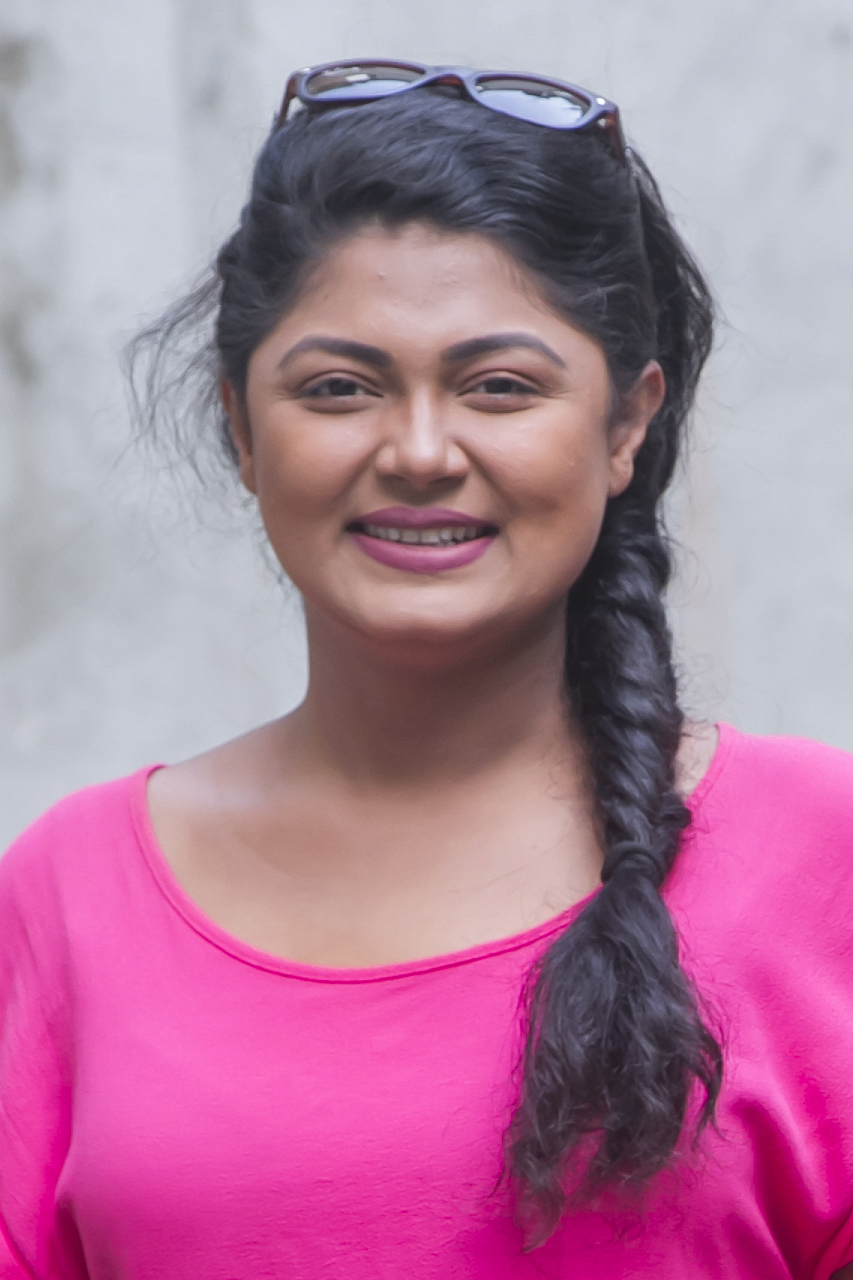
- Hamid in 2015
- Born: 12 October 1988 (age 38); Satkhira, Khulna, Bangladesh
- Education: Azam Khan Commerce College
- Occupations: Actress; model
- Years active: 2010–present
- Height: 5 ft 9.5 in (177 cm)
- Website: www.mousumihamid.com

Mousumi Hamid (born 12 October 1988) is an actress and model from Bangladesh. She rose to prominence after becoming the 1st runner-up in LUX Channel I Superstar 2010. Since then, she worked in several TV shows such as Love Rectangle (Valobasar Chatushkone), Radio Cholocate and several others. Since 2013, Hamid has signed several films including Anonno Mamun's Blackmail (2015), Shafi Uddin Shafi's Purno Doirgho Prem Kahini 2 (2015) and Shamim Ahamed Roni's Mental (2016).

== Early life ==
Hamid was born in Dhaka but her ancestral residence Tala, Satkhira in 1988. After completion of high school, Hamid moved to Khulna to pursue education in management studies and completed her education from Azam Khan Commerce College. After completion, she moved to Dhaka to pursue a career in the media industry.

== Career ==
=== Television ===
In 2011, Hamid took part in Bangladeshi fashion-based reality television series LUX Channel I Superstar, and ended up becoming the runner up in season finale. In 2011, she started her acting career with TV series Roshni (Lights). She later went to star in several other Bangladeshi TV shows such as Radio Cholocate (2012–2013) and Valobasar Chatushkone (2013–present).

=== Films ===
Hamid made her debut into Bangladesh film industry with Na Manush (2013) but came into mainstream films in 2014 with Hudsoner Bonduk. She is currently working on Anonno Mamun's Blackmail alongside Anisur Rahman Milon and Shafi Uddin's Purnodoirgho Prem Kahini 2 alongside Shakib Khan, Joya Ahsan and Emon. She will also make a cameo in Shamim Ahamed Roni's Mental.

== Personal life ==
Hamid married screenwriter Abu Sayeed Rana on 12 January 2024.

== Filmography ==
Films

Key
†	Denotes films that have not yet been released

Year	Title	Role	Notes	Ref.
2013	Na Manush	Moumi	Debut Film	
2014	Jalal's Story	Shila		
2015	Black Money	Sonali		
2015	Blackmail	Muskan		
2016	Mastani	Mou		
2016	Purno Doirgho Prem Kahini 2	Poly	Sequel of Purnodoirgho Prem Kahini	
2016	Mental	Herself	Special appearance in "Khaina Jonab" song	
2019	Bhalobashar Rajkonna	Sheuli Khan Chowdhury		
2019	Shapludu	Nazrul's wife		
2020	The Grave	Archona	Bengali-English bilingual film	
2021	Hudsoner Bonduk	Jhinuk		
2022	Chitmahal	Naren's wife		
2024	Noya Manush	Sujala Debi		
2026	Rongbazar		Released on Cinematic	
2026	Zapito Jibon †	Sumona	Filming; based on Selina Hossain's novel Zapito Jibon	
TBA	Tribunal †	TBA	Filming	

Web series

Year	Title	Role	Notes	Ref.
2021	Tekka		Series on Bioscope	
2023	Guti	Lipi	Series on Chorki	
2025	Bohemian Ghora	Azmeri Haque	Series on Hoichoi	

== Awards & nominations ==
Year	Award	Category	Works	Results	Ref.
2024	Global Star Awards	Best Actress	Guti	Won	
