= List of Bangladeshi submissions for the Academy Award for Best International Feature Film =

Best International Feature Film submissions from Bangladesh

Highlights
- Debut: 2002
- Submissions: 22
- Nominations: none
- Oscar winners: none

Bangladesh has submitted films for the Academy Award for Best International Feature Film (Note: The category was previously named the Academy Award for Best Foreign Language Film, but this was changed to the Academy Award for Best International Feature Film in April 2019, after the Academy deemed the word "Foreign" to be outdated.) since 2002. The award is handed out annually by the United States Academy of Motion Picture Arts and Sciences to a feature-length motion picture produced outside the United States that contains primarily non-English dialogue. It was not created until the 1956 Academy Awards, in which a competitive Academy Award of Merit, known as the Best Foreign Language Film Award, was created for non-English speaking films, and has been given annually since.

As of 2026, Bangladesh has submitted twenty-two films, but none of them were nominated.

== Submissions ==
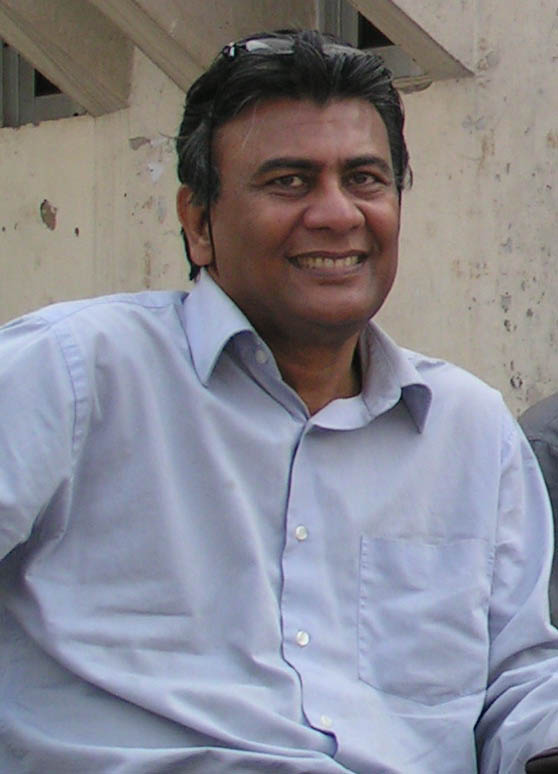
Tareque Masud was the first filmmaker to represent Bangladesh in the category.

The Academy of Motion Picture Arts and Sciences has invited the film industries of various countries to submit their best film for the Academy Award for Best International Feature Film since 1956. The International Feature Film Committee oversees the process and reviews all the submitted films. Following this, they vote via secret ballot to determine the five nominees for the award.

The Bangladeshi nominee is decided annually by the Bangladesh Federation of Film Societies.

All but one of the Bangladeshi submissions since 2005 have been produced by Impress Telefilm Limited film studio, based in the capital Dhaka, and there was a lot of cast crossover between the films. Actors Fazlur Rahman Babu, Jayanta Chattopadhyay and Shahidul Islam Sachchu, as well as actress Rokeya Prachi each had leading roles in three out of the six submitted films, including Britter Baire in which all four co-starred.

All the films submitted were primary in Bengali. Below is a list of the films that have been submitted by Bangladesh for review by the academy for the award by year and the respective Academy Awards ceremony.

| Year (Ceremony) | Film title used in nomination | Original title | Language(s) | Director | Result |
|---|---|---|---|---|---|
| 2002 (75th) | The Clay Bird | মাটির ময়না | Bengali | Tareque Masud | Not nominated |
| 2005 (78th) | Shyamol Chhaya | শ্যামল ছায়া | Bengali | Humayun Ahmed | Not nominated |
| 2006 (79th) | Forever Flows | নিরন্তর | Bengali | Abu Sayeed | Not nominated |
| 2007 (80th) | On the Wings of Dreams | স্বপ্নডানায় | Bengali | Golam Rabbany Biplob | Not nominated |
| 2008 (81st) | Aha! | আহা! | Bengali | Enamul Karim Nirjhar | Not nominated |
| 2009 (82nd) | Beyond the Circle | বৃত্তের বাইরে | Bengali | Golam Rabbany Biplob | Not nominated |
| 2010 (83rd) | Third Person Singular Number | থার্ড পারসন সিঙ্গুলার নাম্বার | Bengali | Mostofa Sarwar Farooki | Not nominated |
| 2012 (85th) | Ghetuputra Komola | ঘেটুপুত্র কমলা | Bengali, English | Humayun Ahmed | Not nominated |
| 2013 (86th) | Television | টেলিভিশন | Bengali | Mostofa Sarwar Farooki | Not nominated |
| 2014 (87th) | Glow of the Firefly | জোনাকির আলো | Bengali | Khalid Mahmood Mithu | Not nominated |
| 2015 (88th) | Jalal's Story | জালালের গল্প | Bengali | Abu Shahed Emon | Not nominated |
| 2016 (89th) | The Unnamed | অজ্ঞাতনামা | Bengali | Tauquir Ahmed | Not nominated |
| 2017 (90th) | The Cage | খাঁচা | Bengali | Khan Akram | Not nominated |
| 2018 (91st) | No Bed of Roses | ডুব | Bengali, English | Mostofa Sarwar Farooki | Not nominated |
| 2019 (92nd) | Alpha | আলফা | Bengali | Nasiruddin Yousuff | Not nominated |
| 2020 (93rd) | Sincerely Yours, Dhaka | ইতি, তোমারই ঢাকা | Bengali | Eleven different directors (Note: An anthology film with eleven different directors: Tanvir Ahsan, Saleh Sobhan Auneem, Krishnendu Chattopadhyay, Mir Mukarram Hossain, Nuhash Humayun, Mahmudul Islam, Golam Kibria, Abdullah Al Noor, Rahat Rahman, Robiul Alam Robi and Syed Ahmed Shawki.) | Not nominated |
| 2021 (94th) | Rehana | রেহানা মরিয়ম নূর | Bengali | Abdullah Mohammad Saad | Not nominated |
| 2022 (95th) | Hawa | হাওয়া | Bengali | Mejbaur Rahman Sumon | Not nominated |
| 2023 (96th) | No Ground Beneath the Feet | পায়ের তলায় মাটি নাই | Bengali | Mohammad Rabby Mridha | Not nominated |
| 2024 (97th) | The Wrestler | বলী | Bengali | Iqbal Hossain Chowdhury | Not nominated |
| 2025 (98th) | A House Named Shahana | বাড়ির নাম শাহানা | Bengali | Leesa Gazi | Not nominated |
| 2026 (99th) | Roid | রইদ | Bengali | Mejbaur Rahman Sumon | Pending |

== See also ==
- List of Academy Award-winning foreign language films
- List of Academy Award winners and nominees for Best International Feature Film
- List of countries by number of Academy Awards for Best International Feature Film
- Cinema of Bangladesh
- Dhallywood
