= Madeleine Boyd =

British set and costume designer and graduate

- Born: Somerset, U.K.
- Website: http://www.madeleineboyd.co.uk

Madeleine Boyd is a British set and costume designer who trained in Theatre Design at Central St. Martins College of Art and Design and graduated in 2001.

== Career ==
In April, 2009 The Independent Opera production of Pelléas et Mélisande (2008) at Sadler's Wells, for which she designed the set and costumes, was shortlisted for The Royal Philharmonic Society award for Opera and Music Theatre.

She was awarded the 2008 design fellowship from Independent Opera at Sadler's Wells, London, and was a finalist in the European Opera Directing Prize 2007, with her Design concept for Rusalka by Antonín Dvořák, with the director Alessandro Talevi.

She has worked primarily in Europe with the American opera director Thaddeus Strassberger and the South African opera director Alessandro Talevi.

Notable productions include Set and Costume Design: La Cenerentola, by Gioachino Rossini for Malmö Opera, Sweden; Orfeo ed Euridice by Christoph Willibald Gluck, at Theater Augsburg, November 2007; La Gazzetta by Gioachino Rossini, Rossini in Wildbad Festival, July 2007. Her designs for Elizabeth Maconchy's one-act operas The Sofa and The Departure, for Independent Opera at Sadler's Wells, in November 2007, were received with acclaim. The Chandos label released a recording of both operas (Chandos CD - CHAN10508), the cover of which features a photograph of her set for The Sofa.

Fiona Maddocks in the London Evening Standard gave these productions a five star review, declaring the designs "exciting stuff".

Madeleine is part of the creative team of Independent Opera at Sadler's Wells, London, which was founded to serve as a London platform for outstanding new directors, designers, singers and others involved in the staging and production of opera.

She has worked as a designer at Les Azuriales opera festival at Cap Ferrat, France, on productions including Partenope by George Frideric Handel.

In 2009 Madeleine designed the costumes for a production of Benjamin Britten's opera Peter Grimes for Teatro San Carlo, in Naples, Italy, conducted by Jeffrey Tate. Further productions in 2009 include La Cenerentola for Malmö Opera and Music Theatre, Sweden, and Les nuits d'été by Hector Berlioz, for Les Azuriales Opera Festival, with the director Thaddeus Strassberger and the conductor Bryan Evans, MBE.

Madeleine has worked as assistant and revival designer for opera productions at La Scala, in Milan, Italy, La Fenice, in Venice, Italy, Vlaamse Opera, in Antwerp, Belgium, the Spoleto Festival, in South Carolina, U.S.A., and Central City Opera in Central City, Colorado, U.S.A.

== Recent designs ==
- Set and Costume Design: L'assedio di Calais by Donizetti at the Guildhall school of music and drama, London.
- Set and Costume Design: La Cenerentola for Malmö Opera, Sweden
- Set and Costume Design: La cambiale di matrimonio and The Marriage, Opera double bill at the Guildhall school of music and drama, London.
- Set and Costume Design: La fedelta premiata, Royal Academy of Music, London
- Costume Design: Peter Grimes for San Carlo Opera House, Napoli.
- Set and Costume Design: Pelléas et Mélisande for Independent Opera at The Lillian Bayliss Theatre, Sadler's Wells, London.
- Set and Costume Design: All about it by Rachael McGill, for the Big Fish Theatre Company, touring show.
- Set and Costume Design: Partenope by Handel, for Les Azuriales Opera at the Ephrussi de Rothschild Villa, Côte d'Azur, France.
- Set and Costume Design: La Colombe and L'occasione fa il ladro, an opera double bill at the Guildhall School of Music and Drama London.
- Set Design: The Sofa and The Departure, two short operas by Elizabeth Maconchy for Independent Opera at The Lilian Bayliss Theatre, Sadler's Wells, London.
- Costume Design: Orfeo ed Euridice by Gluck at Theatre Augsburg, Germany
- Set and Costume Design: La Gazzetta and La scala di seta for the Belcanto Rossini festival in Wildbad, Germany.
- Set Design: Rhymes, reasons and bombass beatz, a hip-hop monologue at the studio space of the Oval Theatre, London.
- Set and Costume Design: True Stories at the studio space of The Drill Hall, London.
- Set and Costume Design: The Turn of the Screw by Benjamin Britten for Opera North
