= Shormi Mala =

Bangladeshi actress

Shormymala
- Occupation: Actress

Shormymala is a Bangladeshi stage, television and film actress. She won Bangladesh National Film Award for Best Actress for her role in the film Mrittika Maya (2013).

== Career ==
Mala got involved in acting with the theater troupe Palakar in 2006. She debuted her film career by her role in Moner Manush (2010).

== Works ==
- Moner Manush (2010)
- Mrittika Maya (2013)
- Jalal's Story (2014)
- Nodijon (2015)
- Zindabahar (2022)
