= The Grave (2020 film) =

2020 Bangladeshi film

- Official poster
- Bengali: গোর
- Directed by: Gazi Rakayet
- Written by: Gazi Rakayet
- Screenplay by: Gazi Rakayet
- Based on: 'Gor' the drama
- Produced by: Gazi Rakayet; Faridur Reza Sagar; Iftekharul Chisty
- Starring: Gazi Rakayet; Dilara Zaman; Moushumi Hamid; Sushoma Sarkar; Ashiul Islam; Deepanwita Martin
- Cinematography: Pankaz Palit; Niaz Mahbub
- Edited by: Muhammad Shariful Islam Rasel
- Music by: Mohammad Fazla Kadar Shadhin
- Production companies: Impress Telefilm Limited; Charuneerom Audio Visual Limited
- Distributed by: Impress Telefilm Limited
- Release dates: 25 December 2020 (Bangladesh); 14 May 2021 (Los Angeles)
- Running time: 132 minutes
- Country: Bangladesh
- Languages: Bangla, English
- Budget: ৳ 6 million

The Grave is a 2020 Bangladeshi English language drama film written and directed by Gazi Rakayet. It is a Bangladesh Government and Impress Telefilm funded joint venture film, based on a journey of an undertaker. It features Gazi Rakayet himself in the title role, Dilara Zaman, Deepanwita Martin, Moushumi Hamid, Sushoma Sarkar, and Shamima Tusty among others. SM Mohsin and Mamunur Rashid also make guest appearances in the film. The film was simultaneously shot in Bengali, titled Gor (Bengali: গোর,transl. the grave) respectively. The film is coined as Bangladesh's first bilingual film project. The Grave is initially released in Bangladesh on 25 December 2020, and later on Hollywood as the first Bangladeshi-produced film. The film was also submitted to compete in the general category of the 94th Academy Awards; as it is the first Bangladeshi film to be competing in this category. The film was added to the 2022 Oscar Reminder List. The film bagged 11 National film awards of Bangladesh.

== Synopsis ==
Rakayet now a middle-aged person has lost everything, his loving family, his daughter, because of a tidal bore. Now he begs, but begging is not the main purpose of his life. He is an undertaker, a gravedigger. He inquires about the death of people through begging. When he was young he came to a Char and got married. They had a lovely daughter named Rahela. He had to go to town for work. Rahela asked for a doll from the town. he bought a doll, while he was returning to the Char from town; but he couldn’t come back to Char due to bad weather. The next day he heard that the tidal bore had washed out the Char. Later he came back to Char. But he didn’t find his daughter and wife anywhere. The Char was full of dead bodies. At that time he started digging graves. Now he has only two possessions in his life. One is a doll which he bought for his daughter and the other is a number which he got from his ancestors. His ancestors believed that if someone could dig a hundred graves he would surely be placed in heaven. But no one could ever reach the target. He believes the only way to get salvation is to dig one hundred graves, so he can go straight to heaven and meet his family. Thus he dug 99 graves. His goal is to dig a hundred graves. He wandered from village to village waiting for the news of people's deaths and digging graves. Then began the wait to achieve his goal, and he falls in a big crisis with a girl who looks like his deceased daughter.

== Cast ==
Note: The actors from Gazi Rakayet to Zarifa Tasnim Abony appear in the opening credits, and the rest of the cast appears in the closing credits.

- Gazi Rakayet as Shirja Mia
- Ashiul Islam as Moja
- A.K. Azad Shetu as Soba
- Deepanwita Martin as Honufa
- Moushumi Hamid as Archona
- Sushoma Sarkar as Annopunna
- Shamima Islam Tusty as Shefali
- Dilara Zaman as Anguri
- Kazi Anisul Haque Borun as Haripod
- SM Mohsin as Anchhu
- Habib Masid as Nibaron
- Omar Faruque as Suresh

Child artists

- Gazi Amatun Nur Duti as Rahala, Soba's daughter.
- Zarifa Tasnim Abony as Rehala, Shirja's daughter.
- Chitrapath Tepantar as Moyna

Other casts

- Roman Khan as Young boy
- Mahmud Alam Chanchal as Sultan
- Hasan Mehedi Laltu as Mugdam
- Shamim Al Mamun as 1st Gentleman
- Mamunur Rashid as 2nd Gentleman
- Akhand Jahid as 3rd Gentleman
- Namita Das as Village Woman
- Nurun Nahar Begum as Anchu's wife
- Tajkia as Anchu's daughter in law
- Gazi Liakat Ali as Imam 1
- Sohel Hasan Sony as Young boy's friend
- Shahin Alam as Young Murubbi
- Ratan Siddique as Gentleman
- Mukter Ahmed as loom labor
- ABM Shahidul Haque as Farmer
- Avi Alamin as Munsi
- Faysul Robin as Imam 2
- Liakat Rahi Ratan
- Sahik Tahiat as Zulhash
- Alamgir Sagar as Archona's brother

Students of Charuneerom school of acting played in Team of Holee.

== Production ==
The screenplay of The Grave is originally adapted from Rakayet's previously scripted and starred, tele-fiction named Gor, aired on Bangladesh Television. Original story was written in 1994 and made in drama for TV in 1998. The film received a grant of 6 million BDT from the Government of Bangladesh for the production of films. Later, Impress Telefilms, was joined to co-produce and distribute the film. Original Bengali screenplay was translated by Abdus Selim for English version. The film was shot in rural scene and inset of Dohar. Uttam Guho provided the art direction for this film. Set was created by clearing space in a jungle. Principal photography was done in October and November in 2018. The film was shot bilingually simultaneously for both international and domestic audiences.

Film's soundtrack and the score is composed by Mohammad Fazla Kadar Shadhin. Only song "Jater meye kalo bhalo" is penned by A.K. Azad, used in the film on Naira Farzin Mahfuza's voice.

== Releases ==
The Grave has been release on few screens in Bangladesh on Christmas Day of 2020. The film was also scheduled to release internationally on 15 January 2021 in Los Angeles. Later on 14 May 2021, the film is commercially released on Laemmle NoHo 7 as the first Bangladeshi production. There were 21 shows run in Laemmle. The Grave was later released in Over the top platforms like Plex TV and Typhoon TV in the USA.

== Accolades ==
The Grave won eleven awards at the 45th National Film Awards in the Best Film, Best Film Director, Best Actor in a Lead Role (Female), Best Story, Best Screenplay, Best Art Direction, Best Cinematographer, Best Editor, Best Makeup, Best Sound Designer, Best Costume categories.

List of accolades received by The Grave
| Award | Date of Announcement | Category | Recipient(s) | Results | Note | Ref(s) |
|---|---|---|---|---|---|---|
| 45th National Film Awards | 15 February 2022 | Best Film | Gor (The Grave) | Won | cowinner with Bishwoshundori | |
| 45th National Film Awards | 15 February 2022 | Best Film Director | Gazi Rakayet | Won | | |
| 45th National Film Awards | 15 February 2022 | Best Actor in a Lead Role (Female) | Deepanwita Martin | Won | | |
| 45th National Film Awards | 15 February 2022 | Best Story | Gazi Rakayet | Won | | |
| 45th National Film Awards | 15 February 2022 | Best Screenplay | Gazi Rakayet | Won | | |
| 45th National Film Awards | 15 February 2022 | Best Art Direction | Uttam Guho | Won | | |
| 45th National Film Awards | 15 February 2022 | Best Cinematographer | Pankaj Palit Mahbub Ullah Niaz | Won | Joint winner | |
| 45th National Film Awards | 15 February 2022 | Best Editor | Muhammad Shariful Islam Rasel | Won | | |
| 45th National Film Awards | 15 February 2022 | Best Makeup | Mohammad Ali Babul | Won | | |
| 45th National Film Awards | 15 February 2022 | Best Sound Designer | Kazi Selim Ahmed | Won | | |
| 45th National Film Awards | 15 February 2022 | Best Costume categories | Enamtara Begum | Won | | |
