= Uraal =

- Promotional poster
- Directed by: Zobaidur Rahman
- Written by: Samrat Pramanik
- Screenplay by: Samrat Pramanik
- Produced by: Sharif Siraj
- Starring: Mahfuz Munna; Sohel Tawfiq; Shanto Chandra Sutradhar
- Cinematography: Ibad Alim
- Edited by: Ashiqur Rahman Sujon
- Music by: Khayyam Sanu Sandhi
- Production companies: Jatra Party & Joker
- Distributed by: Abhi Kothachitra
- Release date: 1 August 2025
- Running time: 99 minutes
- Country: Bangladesh
- Language: Bengali

Ural (Bengali: উড়াল; transl. Flight) is a 2025 Bangladeshi drama film directed by Zobaidur Rahman and produced by Sharif Siraj under the banner of Jatra Party. The film is distributed by Abhi Kothachitra.

The story, screenplay, and dialogues were written by Samrat Pramanik. The lead roles are performed by Mahfuz Munna, Sohel Tawfiq, and Shanto Chandra Sutradhar.

Filming began in mid-2022 and principal photography started on 1 August 2023. Locations included Syedpur, Parbatipur, and Narail in northern Bangladesh.

This film marks the debut of Mahfuz Munna, Sohel Tawfiq, Shanto Chandra Sutradhar, Kabykotha, K M Abdur Razzak, Karbi Dash, Roshen Sharif, and Mir Sarwar Ali Mukul. It is also the first directed film by Zobaidur Rahman and the first produced film by actor Sharif Siraj.

== Cast ==
- Mahfuz Munna as Moti
- Sohel Tawfiq as Ranju
- Shanto Chandra Sutradhar
- Kabykotha as Kumkum
- K M Abdur Razzak
- Karbi Dash as Kabykotha's mother
- Roshen Sharif
- Nurnobi Islam Naim

== Release ==
The film was released on 1 August 2025 in Bangladesh on Friendship Day, distributed by Abhi Kothachitra.
