= Titas Zia =

Bangladeshi film actor

- Education: University of Dhaka
- Occupation: Actor
- Awards: National Film Awards

Titas Zia is a Bangladeshi film actor. He won Bangladesh National Film Award for Best Actor for his role in the film Mrittika Maya (2013).

== Education ==
Although Titas Zia's ancestral home was in Sirajganj, Bangladesh, he grew up in Jhenaidah, and later moved to Dhaka to pursue higher education, graduating from the University of Dhaka with a bachelor's degree in drama.

== Filmography ==
Year	Films	Role	Notes
2013	Mrittika Maya	Boishakh	Won – Bangladesh National Film Award for Best Actor
2021	Nonajoler Kabbo	Rudro	
