= World Costume Festival =

Fashion festival in Vigan City, Philippines

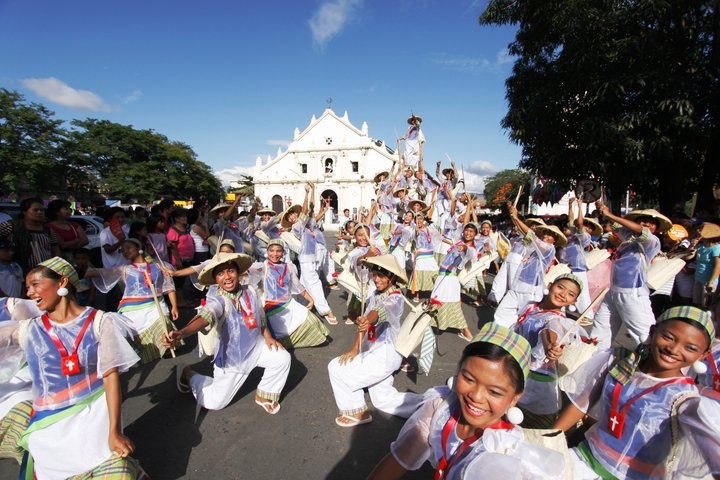
Dancers in Vigan City during the Binatbatan Festival of the Arts.

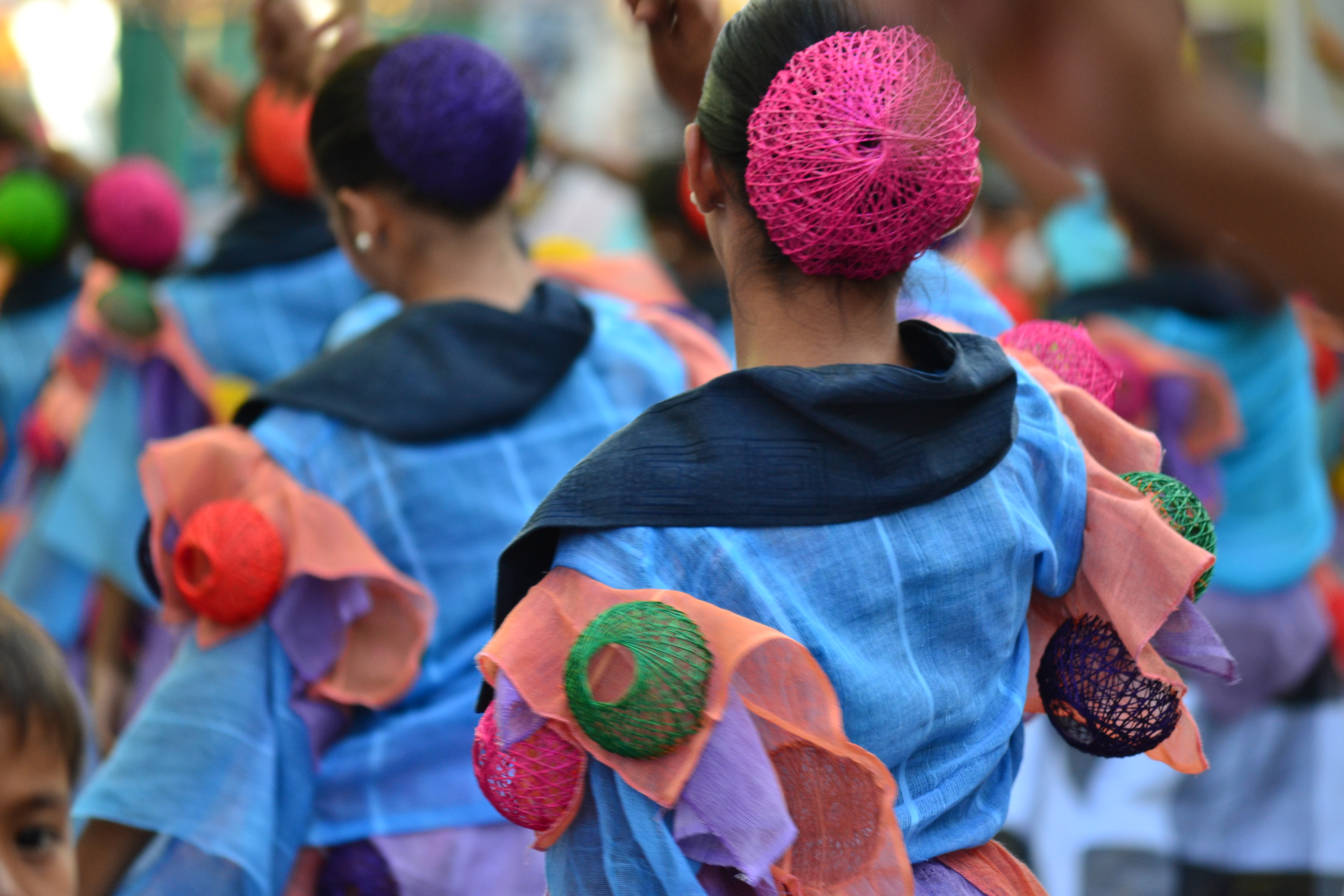
Street dancers in April in Vigan.

The World Costume Festival is an international fashion festival held every two years in the Philippines city of Vigan City in Ilocos Sur. The event showcases indigenous and modern costumes geared towards live performances, such as drama, festivals, events, as well as multimedia presentations. It emphasizes apparel for special ritual occasions or theater performance work as opposed to regular fashion apparel. Its organizers aim to promote tourism as well as encourage native loom-weaving and fabrics. There is an emphasis on fabric materials and Philippine weaving methods such as batik, abel, and piña, from different parts of the Philippines. A festival was held in Vigan City in the last week of April in 2013. The dominant view is that the 2013 festival in Vigan was the first world costume festival, although there is a report of a similar costume festival that was held in Davao City in Mindanao in 2001. There are reports of the event either becoming an annual event or being held every two years. The event coincides with fashion festivals held in different cities in the Philippines. The event was described as a preview for the World Stage Design Festival in Cardiff, Wales. The primary focus of the event is a costume competition. The highest award at the festival is the Golden Kneeling Carabao Trophy, the carabao is a Philippine water buffalo sometimes found in swamps. In addition to the costume competition, the event has workshops, classes by designers, conferences, as well as lectures from international experts. There is a costume parade down the cobblestone streets of Vigan. The event has "jubilant colors" as well as a body-painting competition. The Manila Standard described the event as "kaleidoscopic" with people wearing costumes from the historic past.
