= Gazi Rakayet =

Bangladeshi actor

- গাজী রাকায়েত
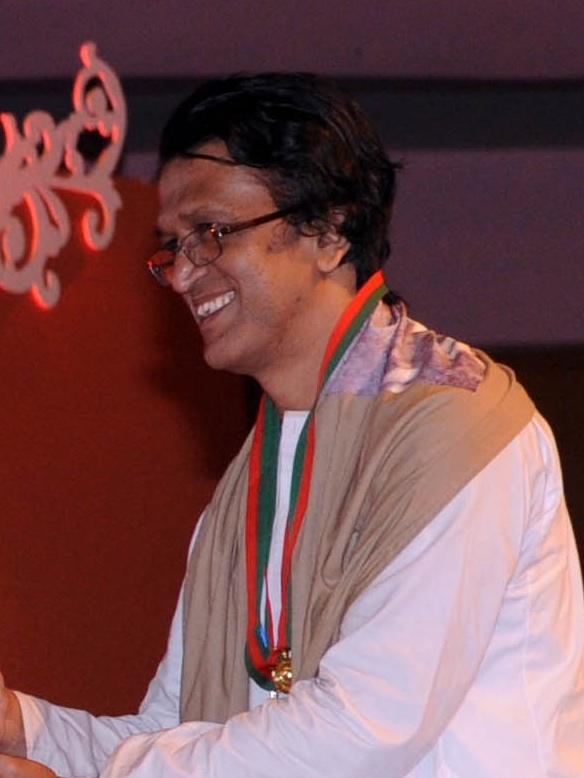
- Gazi Rakayet at the National Film Awards programme in 2015.
- Born: June 15, 1966 (age 60); Shinepukur, Dohar, Dhaka, Bangladesh
- Education: Bangladesh University of Engineering and Technology
- Occupations: Actor; director; producer; story writer
- Spouses: Afsana Mimi (m. 1989; div. 1996) Naira Shahrin (m. 1997)

Gazi Rakayet (born: 15 June 1966) is a Bangladeshi actor, director, producer and story writer who predominantly works in Dhallywood cinema and television drama. He made his debut with the liberation war film Nodir Naam Modhumoti (1996).

He is the recipient of the Bangladesh National Film Awards for Best Film Director for the film Mrittika Maya (2013) and also won the Bangladesh National Film Award for Best Supporting Actor for his performance in the film Anil Bagchir Ekdin (2015). His directorial and produced film The Grave (2020) received the 45th Bangladesh National Film Awards in 11 categories including, the Best Film, Best Film Director, Best Film Actress, Best Story, Best Screenplay, Best Art Direction, Best Cinematographer, Best Editor, Best Makeup, Best Sound Designer and Best Costume designer.

== Education ==
Rakayet passed his SSC exam from Gandaria High School in 1983 and HSC exam with an outstanding result from Notre Dame College, Dhaka in 1985. Then he earned his BSc degree in civil engineering from Bangladesh University of Engineering and Technology in 1993.

== Career ==
In 1980, when Rakayet was in grade seven, he performed in a stage-play named Halchal. In 1988, he joined a team of stage actors at the Group Theatre Federation. Later he performed at Bailey Road for the first time in Kiron Mritya's Amrit Bish, directed by Syed Mohidul Islam. His first web series is Unoloukik. He acted as Ishtiaque Mirza, a writer in Chorki's web film Munshigiri. He later directed and produced the film The Grave, which was shot in his home village of Shinepukur, Dohar.

== Personal life ==
Rakayet born on 15 June 1966. He was married to actress Afsana Mimi until 1996. He remarried in 1997 to Naira Shahrin.

In a podcast interview, Rakayet shared his transition from atheism back to Islam. He stated that his religious faith was restored after examining the scientific and mathematical references while reading a Bengali translation of the Quran.

== Filmography ==
=== As actor ===
Key
| † | Denotes films that have not yet been released |

| Year | Film | Role | Notes | Ref. |
|---|---|---|---|---|
| 1996 | Nodir Naam Modhumoti | Rakayet | Debut film | |
| 2006 | Khelagor | Tunu | | |
| 2007 | Aha! | Kanchan Bhai | | |
| 2008 | The Last Thakur | Saifur Rahman | | |
| 2008 | Chandragrohon | Shombhu | | |
| 2009 | Priyotomeshu | Mijan | | |
| 2011 | Amar Bondhu Rashed | Ajraf Ali | | |
| 2014 | Glow of the Firefly | SM Sultan | | |
| 2015 | Anil Bagchir Ekdin | Ayub Ali | | |
| 2018 | Ahoto Phooler Golpo | Mohona's father | | |
| 2019 | Chandrabati Kotha | Dewan | | |
| 2020 | The Grave | Shirja Mia | Also as director, screenplay, story writer and co-producer | |
| 2021 | Munshigiri | Ishtiaque Mirza | Released on Chorki | |
| 2022 | The Beauty Circus | Nader Molla | | |
| 2022 | Mujib: The Making of a Nation | Abdul Hamid | | |
| 2024 | Toofan | Jalaluddin | | |
| 2025 | Amalnama | Aziz | Released on Chorki | |
| 2025 | Daagi | Mushfiqur Rahim | | |
| 2025 | Taandob | Fayez Karim | | |
| 2025 | Bandhab | | | |
| 2026 | Pressure Cooker | Political Leader | | |
| 2026 | Manushtike Dekho | Minister | Also as director | |
| 2026 | Roid | | | |
| 2026 | Masud Rana | Professor Kabir Chowdhury | | |
| 2026 | Lifeline | | Released on Chorki | |
| 2027 | Andhar † | Jalal | Post-production; scheduled for release on 26 March 2027 | |

=== Other crew positions ===
| Year | Films | Credits | Notes | Ref. |
|---|---|---|---|---|
| 2013 | Mrittika Maya | Director, screenplay, story writer and co-producer | Debut as director | |
| 2020 | The Grave | Director, screenplay, story writer and co-producer | | |
| 2026 | Manushtike Dekho | Director | | |

== Awards and nominations ==
| Year | Award | Category | Work | Results | Note | Ref. |
|---|---|---|---|---|---|---|
| 2013 | National Film Awards | Best Film Director | Mrittika Maya | Won | | |
| 2015 | National Film Award | Best Supporting Actor | Anil Bagchir Ekdin | Won | | |
| 2022 | 45th National Film Awards | Best Film | The Grave | Won | co-winner with Bishwoshundor | |
| 2022 | 45th National Film Awards | Best Film Director | The Grave | Won | | |
| 2022 | 45th National Film Awards | Best Story | The Grave | Won | | |
| 2022 | 45th National Film Awards | Best Screenplay | The Grave | Won | | |
