= Purno Doirgho Prem Kahini =

- Theatrical Release Poster
- Directed by: Shafi Uddin Shafi
- Screenplay by: Rumman Rashid Khan
- Story by: Rumman Rashid Khan
- Produced by: Friends Movies International
- Starring: Shakib Khan; Joya Ahsan; Arifin Shuvoo
- Cinematography: Tapon Ahmed
- Music by: Shawkat Ali Emon; Kaushik Hossain Taposh; Sayeem Afran
- Distributed by: Friends Movies International
- Release date: 16 October 2013
- Running time: 158 minutes
- Country: Bangladesh
- Language: Bengali
- Box office: ৳3.5 crore (equivalent to ৳7.2 crore or US$590,000 in 2024)

Purno Doirgho Prem Kahini (transl. Full-length Love Story) also known by initialism as PDPK, is a 2013 Bangladeshi romance film written by Rumman Rashid Khan and directed by Shafi Uddin Shafi. The film stars Shakib Khan, Joya Ahsan, and Arifin Shuvoo with Razzak, Anwara, Diti, Subrata, Lamia Mimo and Saju Khadem in supporting roles.

== Plot ==
The film's plot centres on Joy, an aeronautical engineer who is engaged to his cousin, Mitu. However, he promises his grandfather that he will not marry until he has found his missing aunt and uncle. This prompts Joy to travel to Malaysia to search for them. While there, he falls in love with Zara, a UN employee. Zara's childhood friend, billionaire businessman Shakib, also confesses his love for her. They become acquainted, and Zara helps Joy find his aunt. Appreciative of her help and companionship, Joy falls for Zara. In order to avoid him, Zara begins a relationship with another man: Shakib Ahmed. The film takes a dramatic turn when Joy discovers that Zara is his aunt's daughter, while Shakib plots to win her over. Ultimately, Joy must choose between his responsibilities to his family and his love for Zara.

== Cast ==
- Shakib Khan as Joy Shikder
- Joya Ahsan as Zara Haque
- Arifin Shuvoo as Shakib Ahmed
- Razzak as Samad Shikdar
- Anwara as Rokeya Begum
- Parveen Sultana Diti as Nishat Shikdar
- Subrata as Dr. Shamsul Haque
- Mimo as Mitu Shikder
- Shaju Khadem as Sentu
- Sohel Rana as the Narrator
- Bobita as the Narrator

== Music ==
Purno Doirgho Prem Kahini

Soundtrack album by Showkat Ali Emon
- Released: October 5, 2013
- Recorded: 2012/13
- Genre: Film soundtrack
- Length: 36:07
- Language: Bengali
- Label: Laser Vision

The soundtrack for the film is composed by Showkat Ali Emon and Kaushik Hossain Taposh composed one songs as guest composers, with the lyrics penned by Kabir Bakul. The soundtrack features 7 tracks overall.

Purno Doirgho Prem Kahini Album: Track listing
No.	Title	Music	Singer(s)	Length
1.	"O Priyo Ami Tomar Hote Chai"	Showkat Ali Emon	Dinat Jahan Munni & Taasif	5:40
2.	"Ami Nissho Hoye Jabo"	Kaushik Hossain Taposh	Chandan Sinha	4:41
3.	"Akash Hote Ami Chai"	Shawkat Ali Emon	Nancy	5:36
4.	"Ek Mutho Roddur"	Shawkat Ali Emon	S. I. Tutul & Dinat Jahan Munni	4:02
5.	"Hamillon Er Pagla Bashi"	Shawkat Ali Emon	Pulok	5:08
6.	"Premer Tajmahal"	Shawkat Ali Emon	Muhin, Sonia, Ronty & Kishor	4:29
7.	"Priyo Ami Tomar Hote Chai"	Shawkat Ali Emon	Dinat Jahan Munni, Taasif & Shakib Khan	6:19

== Reception ==
- Purnodoirgho Prem Kahini was theatrically released on 16 October 2013, on the occasion of Eid al-Adha. The film opened to major critical success and earned numerous accolades. It received six Meril Prothom Alo Awards nominations, with Khan winning Best Actor and Ahsan winning Best Actress. The film had the longest theatrical run in 2013, completing over 100 days at the box office. The film was a blockbuster at the box office, and one of the biggest film of 2013. Due to the film's commercial success, the producers announced a sequel titled Purno Doirgho Prem Kahini Two, which was released on 8 April 2016.
- The film completed 50 days in 20 centers.
- The film completed 100 days in 6 centers.

== Awards ==
Meril Prothom Alo Awards
Category	Name	Result
Best Actor	Shakib Khan	Won
Best Actress	Joya Ahsan	Won
Best Actor	Arifin Shuvo	Nominated
Best Singer	Chandan Sinha	Nominated
Best Singer (female)	Dinat Jahan Munni	Nominated
Best Singer (female)	Nancy	Won

== Sequel ==
The original production team had announced plans to make a sequel called Purno Doirgho Prem Kahini 2. the sequel will retain leads Shakib Khan and Joya Ahsan, while Mamnun Hasan Emon and Moushumi Hamid is a new addition to the cast and is released on 8 April 2016 to positive response from Critic and audience.
