= Mrittika Maya =

- Film poster
- Directed by: Gazi Rakayet
- Written by: Gazi Rakayet
- Produced by: Gazi Rakayet; Faridur Reza Sagar
- Starring: Titas Zia; Shormi Mala; Raisul Islam Asad
- Cinematography: Saiful islam Badal
- Edited by: Md. Shoriful Isam Rasel
- Music by: AK Azad
- Production company: Impress Telefilm Limited
- Distributed by: Impress Telefilm Limited
- Release date: 6 September 2013
- Running time: 150 minutes
- Country: Bangladesh
- Language: Bengali

Mrittika Maya is a 2013 Bangladeshi film about the heartbreaking life of an old potter. The film's script, screenplay and direction were done by Gazi Rakayet and produced by Faridur Reza Sagar and Gazi Rakaet. The star casts of this film include Lutfur Rahman George, Mamunur Rashid, Pijush Bandyopadhyay, Akhteruzzaman, Wahida Mollick Jolly, Mrinal Dutta and many more. The film was released for the mass audience on September 6.

== Story ==
Khirmohon is an old man and a potter by profession. All his life, he has struggled to keep his head above water and now is the owner of his own pottery house and a banyan tree. His two sons, Satten and Nikhil, stay in the city and prefer urban life. They have no interest in their father's business and want to sell his life's work for financial gain. The silver lining in Khirmohon's life is his granddaughter Poddo, who is an eye catching dusky beauty. They stay in the pottery house with another person named Boishakh, who was adopted by Khirmohon when he was just a mere child. Boishakh is a passionate character,who is loyal to Khirmohon and is more interested in keeping the pottery business afloat then Khirmohon's own sons. There is a spark between Poddo and Boishakh, but it is not expressed. The story moves forward with Boishakh trying to protect the business from going into ruins by unwanted invaders and village politics.

== Cast ==
- Raisul Islam Asad - Khirmohon
- Titas Zia - Boishakh
- Shormi Mala - Poddo
- Aparna Ghosh
- Mamunur Rashid
- Pijush Bandyopadhyay
- Lutfur Rahman George
- Akhteruzzaman
- Wahida Mallik Jolly
- Mrinal Dutta
- Ashiul Islam - Niren

== Soundtrack ==
The soundtrack of the film composed by AK Azad.

== Awards ==
Gazi Rakayet and Faridur Reza Sagor's 'Mrittika Maya' won awards in 17 categories including best director, best music director, best supporting actor, best actor in negative role, best story, best script writer and best art. It also stood second at SAARC Film Festival, held in Sri Lankan capital Colombo from May 26–31, winning a silver crest.
