= Bishwoshundori =

2020 Bangladeshi film

- Theatrical release poster
- Bengali: বিশ্বসুন্দরী
- Directed by: Chayanika Chowdhury
- Written by: Rumman Rashid Khan
- Starring: Siam Ahmed; Pori Moni; Alamgir; Champa; Fazlur Rahman Babu
- Cinematography: Khair Khandakar
- Music by: Farid Ahmed; Pintu Ghosh; Imran Mahmudul; Pritom Hasan
- Production companies: Sun Music & Motion Pictures Limited
- Distributed by: Jaaz Multimedia
- Release date: 11 December 2020
- Running time: 135 Minutes
- Country: Bangladesh
- Language: Bangla

Bishwoshundori (Bengali: বিশ্বসুন্দরী) is a 2020 Bangladeshi romantic drama film. It is director Chayanika Chowdhury's debut film. The film is written by Rumman Rashid Khan, and stars Siam Ahmed, Pori Moni, Champa, Fazlur Rahman Babu & Alamgir. The film is produced by Sun Music & Motion Pictures Limited and distributed by Jaaz Multimedia. Masranga Television is the broadcast partner & owns the TV rights. The soundtracks of the film are composed by Imran, Pritom Hasan, Kona, Farid Ahmed and Pintu Ghosh.

The film premiered in theatres on 11 December 2020. It was scheduled to release on 27 March 2020, in occasion of Independence Day of Bangladesh, but the release was postponed due to COVID-19 pandemic.

== Cast ==
- Siam Ahmed as Shadhin
- Pori Moni as Shova
- Alamgir
- Fazlur Rahman Babu
- Champa
- Monira Mithu
- GM Tonoy

== Soundtrack ==
#	Title	Singer(s)
1	"Tui Ki Amar Hobi Re"	Imran, Kona
