= List of Bangladeshi films of 2004 =

This is a list of Bangladeshi films that were released in 2004.

== Releases ==
Opening	Title	Director	Cast	Genre	Notes	Ref.
	Bidrohi Salauddin	Masum Parvez Rubel		Action		
	Prem Korechi Besh Korechi	Badol Khandokar	Chunkey Pandey, Rituparna Sengupta, Riaz	Romance		
	Footpather Raja	Shahadat Hossain Liton				
	Lalon	Tanvir Mokammel	Raisul Islam Asad, Shomi Kaiser, Azad Abul Kalam	Drama, history	based on the life of Lalon	
	Khairun Sundari	A.K Shohel	Ferdous Ahmed, Rachana Banerjee, ATM Shamsuzzaman	Folk drama		
	Nogno Gaddar	Shahadat Ali Shiplu				
	Rukhe Darao	Shahadat Hossain Liton	Sahara			
	Shankhonad	Abu Sayeed	Zahid Hasan, KS Firoz, Nazma Anwar, Fazlur Rahman Babu	Drama		
	Shasti	Chashi Nazrul Islam	Riaz, Purnima, Ilias Kanchan, Champa	Drama	based on Rabindranath Tagore's novel	
	Tornado Kamal	Masum Parvez Rubel		Action		
	Vikkha Dey	A. R. Ruhin				
2 January	Bachelor	Mostofa Sarwar Farooki	Shabnur, Ferdous, Hasan Masood, Joya Ahsan, Aupee Karim, Marjuk Russel	Comedy, drama, romance		
25 March	Wrong Number	Motin Rahman	Riaz, Abdul Kader, Dolly Johur, Shrabanti, Nasir Rahman, Tushar Khan, Amol Bosh, Tahsina, Taskina	Drama, world		
2 April	Bhaier Shotru Bhai	Montazur Rahman Akbar	Monwar Hossain Dipjol, Manna, Shabnur, Moyuri, Amit Hasan	Action		
	Megher Pore Megh	Chashi Nazrul Islam	Riaz, Purnima, Mahfuz Ahmed, Shahidul Alam Sachchu	Drama		
8 July	Ek Khondo Jomi	Shahjahan Chowdhury	Raisul Islam Asad, Champa, Anwar Hossain	Drama		
4 November	Taka	Shahidul Islam Khokon	Riaz, Purnima, Sohel Rana, Alamgir, Humayun Faridi, Suchorita and Hridoy Islam	Drama, mystery		
	Bostir Rani Suriya	Montazur Rahman Akbar	Sadika Parvin Popy, Shakib Khan	Action		
15 November	Manna Bhai	FI Manik	Manna	Action		
3 December	Joyjatra	Tauquir Ahmed	Mahfuz Ahmed, Bipasha Hayat, Abul Hayat, Azizul Karim	Drama, history, war	based on Bangladesh Liberation War	
16 December	Shyamol Chhaya	Humayun Ahmed	Humayun Faridi, Challenger, Riaz	Drama, history, war	based on Bangladesh Liberation War	

== See also ==
- 2004 in Bangladesh
- List of Bangladeshi films of 2005
- List of Bangladeshi films
- Cinema of Bangladesh
- Dhallywood
