= 29th Bangladesh National Film Awards =

2004 film award ceremony in Bangladesh

- Awarded for: Best of Bangladeshi cinema in 2004
- Awarded by: President of Bangladesh
- Presented by: Ministry of Information
- Presented on: October 23, 2008
- Site: Bangladesh-China Friendship Conference Centre, Dhaka, Bangladesh
- Hosted by: Alamgir and Farzana Brownia
- Official website: Official website

Highlights
- Best Film: Joyjatra
- Best Actor: Humayun Faridi জাহিদুল হাসান; Matritwa
- Best Actress: Aupee Karim; Bachelor
- Most awards: Joyjatra (7)

The 29th National Film Awards, presented by Ministry of Information, Bangladesh to felicitate the best of Bangladeshi Cinema released in the year 2004. Bangladesh National Film Awards is a film award ceremony in Bangladesh established in 1975 by Government of Bangladesh. Every year, a national panel appointed by the government selects the winning entry, and the award ceremony is held in Dhaka. Chief Adviser Dr. Fakhruddin Ahmed presented the awards at the Bangladesh-China Friendship Conference Centre on October 23, 2008.

== List of winners ==
An eleven-member jury board chaired by the additional secretary of the Ministry of Information selected the winners in 15 different categories.

=== Merit Awards ===
Name of Awards	Winner(s)	Film
Best Film	Tauquir Ahmed and Impress Telefilm Limited	Joyjatra
Best Director	Tauquir Ahmed	Joyjatra
Best Actor	Humayun Faridi	Mattritto
Best Actress	Aupee Karim	Bachelor
Best Actor in a Supporting Role	Fazlur Rahman Babu	Shonkhonaad
Best Actress in a Supporting Role	Mehbooba Mahnoor Chandni	Joyjatra
Best Child Artist	Master Amal	Durotto
Best Music Director	Shujeo Shyam	Joyjatra
Best Male Playback Singer	Subir Nandi	Megher Pore Megh

=== Technical Awards ===
Name of Awards	Winner(s)	Film
Best Story	Amjad Hossain	Joyjatra
Best Screenplay	Tauquir Ahmed	Joyjatra
Best Cinematography	Rafiqul Bari Chowdhury (posthumous)	Joyjatra
Best Art Director	Uttam Guho	Lalon
Best Editing	Junayed Halim	Shankhonad
Best Makeup	M.M. Jasim	Ek Khondo Jomi

== See also ==
- Bachsas Film Awards
- Meril Prothom Alo Awards
- Ifad Film Club Award
- Babisas Award
