= Australian Council =

Australian Council may refer to:

- Australian Council for Educational Research, a non-governmental educational research organisation based in Camberwell, Victoria
- Australian Council of Film Societies, the national body for film societies in Australia
- Australian Council of Social Service, an Australian advocacy group that represents the interests of organisations and individuals engaged in social welfare in Australia
- Australian Council of Trade Unions, the largest peak national body representing workers in Australia
- Australian Dance Council, a national dance advocacy organisation for dancers, choreographers, directors and educators
- Australian Medical Council, a national standards advisory body for medical education and training
- Australian National Kennel Council, the peak body in Australia responsible for promoting excellence in breeding, showing, trialling, obedience, and other canine-related activities
- Australian Press Council, the self-regulatory body of the Australian print media
- Australian Research Council, the Australian Government's main agency for allocating research funding to academics and researchers in Australian universities

== See also ==
- Australia Council, full name the Australia Council for the Arts
- Australian Football Council (disambiguation)
- Australian Legislative Council (disambiguation)
