= Badal Rahman =

Bangladeshi film director

- Born: June 4, 1949
- Died: June 11, 2010 (aged 61); Dhaka, Bangladesh
- Occupation: Film director

Badal Rahman (June 4, 1949 – June 11, 2010 ) was a Freedom Fighter of Bangladesh Liberation War 1971, Bangladeshi film director, Film Society Activist, Writer & Cultural Personality. In 1980 he became the first director to create a full-length feature film for children in Bangladesh, Emiler Goenda Bahini. The film was an adoption of Erich Kästner's novel Emil und die Detektive published in 1929.

== Biography ==
Rahman completed his diploma in film editing from the Film and Television Institute of India. In 1974, he, along with Syed Salahuddin Zaki made his first film, Prottashar Shurjo. After directing Emiler Goenda Bahini, he made two more children's films - Kanthal Burir Bagan and Chhana O Muktijuddha, both films funded by Bangladesh Shishu Academy.

Rahman served as the president of the Federation of Film Societies of Bangladesh (FFSB) until his death.

Rahman had two daughters and one son Abhishek.

=== Legacy ===
In 2011, filmmakers Belayat Hossain Mamun and Saiful Islam Jarnal jointly directed a documentary based on Rahman's life. Dhaka International Film Festival renamed Best Children Film Award as Badal Rahman Award.

Moviyana Film Society organize Badal Rahman Memorial Lecture every year.

Moviyana Film Society consistently remembered late filmmaker Badal Rahman 2011 to 2018

== Works ==
- Emiler Goenda Bahini (1980)
- Prottashar Shurjo (1974)
- Kathal Burir Bagan (1988)
- Chhana O Muktijuddha (2009)

== Awards ==
Badal Rahman was honored Golden Jubilee Memorial Honours from Bangladesh Chalachchitra Sangsad Andolon (BCSA).
