= Tareen Jahan =

Bangladeshi actress, model and singer

- তারিন জাহান
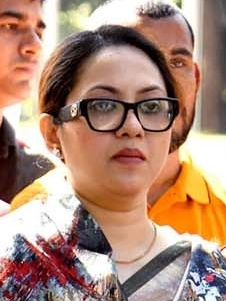
- Jahan in 2022
- Born: Yeasmin Tazreen Jahan Tareen; 26 July
- Occupations: Actress; model; singer
- Years active: 1988–present
- Spouses: Sohel Arman (m. 2001; div. 2001)
- Awards: Meril Prothom Alo Awards

Yeasmin Tazreen Jahan Tareen (born 26 July), commonly known as Tareen Jahan, is a Bangladeshi actress, model and singer. She is mostly known for her acting career in the television dramas and telefilms. In 1985, she stood first at the reality television competition program Notun Kuri for acting, dancing and storytelling divisions. She won Meril Prothom Alo Awards three times for her roles in Kotha Chhilo Onnorokom (2006), Maya (2007) and Green Velvet (2012).

== Early life ==
Jahan was born to Mohammad Shahjahan (d. 2021) and Tahmina Jahan. In 1985, Jahan stood first in the acting, dancing, and storytelling category in Bangladeshi talent hunt Notun Kuri. She took classical music lessons from Hasan Ikram Ullah. At the age of three, her mother would send her daughter to Tapan Das Gupta to learn dancing. She obtained a master's degree in social work from Lalmatia Women's College. She is the youngest among the five sisters including Nahin Kazi, a notable beautician and makeup artist.

== Career ==
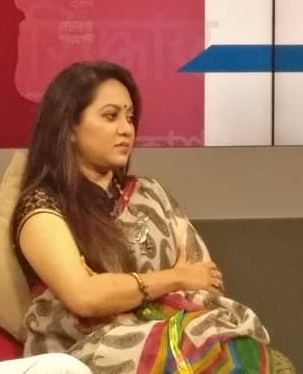
In 2018.

Jahan got her first major role as a child actor in the TV serial Ei Shob Din Ratri then she acted on the mega serial named Songsoptok, based on the novel by Shahidullah Kaiser, as a child artist in 1988. She acted in a film as a child actress in Kathal Burir Bagan (1988), directed by Badal Rahman. As an adult, she acted mostly in numerous television plays and teleflims. Her notable works plays include Ful Baganer Sap, Kotha Chilo Onyorokom, U Turn, Maya, Harano Akash, Rajkonya, Shobuj Velvet and Ogni Bolaka, and also telefilms like Megher Arale Megh and Ilish.

By 2013, Jahan acted in two films – Pirit Ratan Pirit Jatan and Kajaler Dinratri (2013). She then acted in a Bangladesh Liberation War based film, 1971 Shei Shob Din (2023). In April 2024, she debuted in Indian Bengali cinema, through the film Eta Amader Golpo, directed by Manasi Sinha. Their second collaboration, 5 No Shopnomoy Lane, will be released in December 2024.

Besides, Jahan voiced for Priyanka Upendra and Priyanka Banerjee in two Indian-Bangla films and also one film for Shabnur. She owns a production house, A New Tree Entertainment Production.

=== Singing ===
Jahan released her first solo album, named Akash Debo Kake, in Eid ul Adha in 2011. There were ten tracks on the album, with four duet tracks where she sang with Raghab Chatterjee and Rupankar Bagchi of Kolkata and Ibrar Tipu and Tapan Chowdhury of Bangladesh. Joy Sarkar and Rupankar of Kolkata and Bappa Mazumder, Ibrar Tipu and Belal Khan were the composers of the album. All the tracks are based on different themes including mind, suffering, rain, hope, pain, sky, request, mother and others. She dedicated a song titled "Amar Prothom Dekha Nayok" to her father. This song was penned by Julfikar Rasel and composed by Ibrar Tipu. She also sang the title song of a drama named "Shopno Gulo Jonak Pokar Moto". This song was written by Arun Chowdhury and composed by Ibrar Tipu.

== Personal life ==
Jahan was married to Sohel Arman, a son of filmmaker Amjad Hossain, for less than a year in 2001.

== Television appearances ==
=== Dramas and telefilms ===
Year	Title	Playwright & Director	Aired on	Notes & Source
1985-1986	Ei Shob Din Ratri	Humayun Ahmed, Mostafizur Rahman	Bangladesh Television	drama serial, acted as a child artist
1988	Songsoptok	Shahidullah Kaiser	Bangladesh Television	drama serial, acted as a child artist
	Kathalburi			debut as a lead actress
	Fuler Bagane Saap			acted first with Afzal
2006	Kotha Chhilo Onnorokom			won Meril Prothom Alo Awards in Best TV Actress (Popular) category
2006	U-Turn			
2007	Maya			won Meril Prothom Alo Awards in Best TV Actress (Popular) category
	Harano Akash			
	Nupur			
	Bochhor Kuri Por			
2011	Rajkonna			produced by her Tana Production House
2012	Sobuj Velvet	Muhammad Zafar Iqbal; Abu Raihan Jewel	ntv	and won Meril Prothom Alo Awards in Best TV Actress (Critics) category
2012	Kalantar			
2012	Nakful	Niaz Mahbub; Pantho Sahriar		Produced by herself
2012	Chhayabrita	Tauquir Ahmed	ATN Bangla	TV serial
2012	Kagojer Bari	Arun Chowdhury	ntv	TV serial
2012	Bono Chaltar Gaye	Prasun Rahman; Mahfuz Ahmed		5-episode TV serial, aired on Eid-ul-Adha
2013	Sopno Golu Jonak Pokar Moto	Jakaria Soukhin; Chayonika Chowdhury	ATN Bangla	TV serial, sang the title song
2013	Juary	Giasuddin Selim; Chayonika Chowdhury	ATN Bangla	Eid Special Telefilm, Produced by herself
2013	Shondhikkhon	Pantho Shahriar; Niaz Mahbub	SA TV	Eid Special Telefilm, Produced by herself
2013	Death of Birthday	Masum Reza; Awlad Hossain	ATN Bangla	Eid Special Telefilm
2013	Jotsna O Tar Jol	Tauquir Ahmed; Arif Khan		Eid Special Telefilm
2013	Brishti	Chayonika Chowdhury		Eid Special TV play
2013	Rong Tulir Achor	Saiful Islam Mannu; Chayonika Chowdhury		Eid Special TV play
2013	Grand Master	Sahjahan Sourav; Dipankar Dipan		TV serial
2013	Hey Nistobdho Purnima Jamini	Bipasha Hayat; Tauquir Ahmed		Eid special TV play
2013	Abonti Tomar Opekkhay	MS Rana; Naim Imtiaz Niamul	Banglavision	3 episode drama, aired on Eid
2013	My Husband My Hero	Sahjahan Sourav; Nuzhat Alvi Ahmed	Channel 9	
2014	Golpoti Sotti	Naim Imtiaz Niamul	SA TV	
2014	Onucched 71	Shanta Rahman	ATN Bangla	Independent Day special TV play
2014	Kalo Mokhmol	Niaz Mahbub		TV serial
2014	Mon	Iraj Ahmed; Chayonika Chowdhury	Ekushey Television	Telefilm, aired on Pahela Baishakh
2014	Bewarish Manush	Tarikul Islam		
2014	Oporanno	Sakhawat Hossain Manik	ntv	aired on Eid
2014	Sigmar Telephone Songlap	Dilara Hashem; Ezaz Munna		
2014	Delishia Hotya	Rokeya Sakhawat Hossain; Begum Momtaz Hossain	Bangladesh Television	

=== Television ===
Year	Program	Anchor	Channel	Notes
	Sur Ar Anondo	Tarin		as host
2013	Gaane Alapone	Tarin	ntv	as host, aired on Valentine's Day

== Filmography ==
Tarin acted in two films, Pirit Roton Pirit Joton and Kajoler Dinratri. Kajoler Dinratri was submitted for National Film Awards 2013.

Year	Film	Notes
	Pirit Roton Pirit Joton	
2013	Kajoler Dinratri	

== Discography ==
=== Solo ===
Year	Album	Notes
2012	Akash Debo Kake?	4 tracks of the album are duets, including one with Tapan Chowdhury

=== Film scores ===
Year	Film	Notes
2013	Shopno Gulo Jonak Pokar Moto	Serial drama directed by Chayanika Chowdhury.

== Awards and nominations ==
Year	Award Title	Category	Drama	Result
1982	Notun Kuri	Acting, Dancing, Story Telling		First
2006	Meril Prothom Alo Awards	Best TV Actress (Popular)	Kotha Chhilo Onnorokom	Won
2007	Meril Prothom Alo Awards	Best TV Actress (Popular)	Maya	Won
2012	Meril Prothom Alo Awards	Best TV Actress (Critics)	Green Velvet	Won
