= Moviyana Film Society =

Bangladeshi film culture organization

- Formation: 10 November 2006
- Founder: Belayat Hossain Mamun
- Founded at: Dhaka, Bangladesh
- Type: Non government cultural organization
- Legal status: Registered
- Purpose: Film Society
- Location: Aziz Super Market (1st Floor) Shahbag, Dhaka-1000
- Region served: Bangladesh
- Official language: Bengali
- President: Belayat Hossain Mamun
- Main organ: Central Executive Committee
- Affiliations: Federation of Film Societies of Bangladesh

The Moviyana Film Society (Bengali: ম্যুভিয়ানা ফিল্ম সোসাইটি) is one of the largest film culture oriented organisations in Bangladesh. It was established on 10 November 2006. It regularly arranges film screenings, film festivals, a film appreciation course and other film making related courses in different cities of Bangladesh. Film maker and writer Belayat Hossain Mamun is the founder and incumbent president of this organization.

Moviyana Film Society is affiliated to the Federation of Film Societies of Bangladesh (FFSB).

== Activities ==
Moviyana Film Society also arranged a three-month long workshop on Digital Film Making with Bangladesh Shilpakala Academy from April, 2012.

In 2013, Moviyana Film Society organised a 6-day “Film Festival of Women Filmmakers in Bangladesh” at the National Art Gallery Auditorium, featuring 31 films, all by Bangladeshi women directors.

Moviyana Film Society organized yearlong film festival titled ‘New Films New Filmmakers Film Festival’ jointly with Bangladesh Shilpakala Academy (BSA)

Moviyana Film Society and Bangladesh Shilpakala Academy organised Asian Cinema Retrospective 2016, set to screen 65 films from 19 countries over a 17-week period. The retrospective featured discussions on Asian films and noted Asian film makers.

A three-month long Cinematography Training Workshop organized by Moviyana Film Society with Bangladesh Shilpakala Academy at 2017.

Moviyana Film Society, in support with Bangladesh Shilpakala Academy, organised a discussion programme in memory of the talented actor, editor and photographer Dolly Anwar to celebrate her 70th birth anniversary, at 3 July 2018 in the conference room of Jatiya Natyashala, BSA.

in 2018 Moviyana Film Society organizes a three-day long workshop on Films of Tareque Masud and Catherine Masud.

Moviyana Film Society consistently organized memorial Lecture of late Filmmaker Badal Rahman at 2011 to 2018.

Moviyana Film Society celebrated late renowned Swedish filmmaker Ingmar Bergman’s birth centennial through a two-day workshop and film screening at Bangladesh Shilpakala Academy. The workshop titled was ‘Bergman- Path’, feature in-depth analysis of Bergman's writings and films. Film-critic and writer Mahmudul Hossain conduct the workshop and Moviyana Film Society president Belayat Hossain Mamun coordinate the event.

To Celebrate Living legend Filmmaker Mrinal Sen's 95th Birthday Moviyana Film Society organized a film screening followed by a discussion on his work at Bangladesh Shilpakala Academy. film researcher Dr Naadir Junaid, film activists Zayeed Aziz and Filmmaker & Writer Belayat Hossain Mamun spoke about the significance of Mrinal Sen's work.

Moviyana Film Society holding a two-day workshop on French film critic Andre Bazin marking his 100th birth anniversary at Seminar Hall of Bangladesh Shilpakala Academy at 14 and 15 December 2018. Art critic Moinuddin Khaled and film critic, writer Mahmudul Hossain are conducting the workshop. Workshop coordinated by Moviyana Film Society's president Belayat Hossain Mamun. ‘Through this workshop we want to promote Andre Bazin's thoughts and theories among young film enthusiasts of Bangladesh,’ said Belayat Hossain Mamun.

Moviyana Film Society remembered Filmmaker Alamgir Kabir on his 30th death anniversary. Moviyana organized a two-day long workshop on films and thoughts of Alamgir Kabir.
