= Ek Khondo Jomi =

- Movie poster
- Directed by: Shahjahan Chowdhury
- Written by: Shahabuddin Nagri
- Produced by: Shahjahan Chowdhury
- Starring: Raisul Islam Asad; Champa; Anwar Hossain
- Cinematography: Mahfuzur Rahman Khan
- Music by: Sheikh Sadi Khan
- Release date: 8 July 2004
- Running time: 96 minutes
- Country: Bangladesh
- Language: Bengali

Ek Khondo Jomi (Bengali: এক খন্ড জমি) is a 2004 Bangladeshi film starring Raisul Islam Asad and Champa. The film was made from poet Shahabuddin Nagri's 2003 poem of the same title. Nagri wrote it in 2003 Ekushey Book Fair. Nagri also wrote the script and the songs of the film. Ek Khondo Jomi was the first Bangladeshi feature film made from a poem, confirmed by the director himself. For Shahjahan, who earlier made films like Pinjor (1976), Shotru (1986) and Uttarer Khep (2002), this film was his fourth stint as a director.

== Soundtrack ==
No.	Title	Lyrics	Music	singer	Length
1.	"Bortomane Amra Byasto Sobai"	Shahabuddin Nagri	Sheikh Sadi Khan	Shahabuddin Nagri
2.	"Asha Chilo Chhotto Ekta Jomi Hobe"	Shahabuddin Nagri	Sheikh Sadi Khan	Shahabuddin Nagri
3.	"Asha Chilo Chhotto Ekta Jomi Hobe (sad)"	Shahabuddin Nagri	Sheikh Sadi Khan	Shahabuddin Nagri
4.	"Jibon Hoilo Rongin Ghuri"	Shahabuddin Nagri	Sheikh Sadi Khan	Shahabuddin Nagri
5.	"Tumi Padma Patar Jol"	Shahabuddin Nagri	Sheikh Sadi Khan	Shahabuddin Nagri & Shakila Zafar

== Awards ==
Year	Award Giving Body	Category	Nominee	Result	Ref
2008	29th Bangladesh National Film Awards	Best Makeup	M. M. Jashim	Won	
