= Kathal Burir Bagan =

- Directed by: Badal Rahman
- Written by: Badal Rahman
- Starring: Suborna Mustafa; Tareen Jahan; Humayun Faridi; Dilara Zaman
- Release date: 1988
- Running time: 48 mins
- Country: Bangladesh
- Language: Bengali

Kathal Burir Bagan (Bengali: কাঁঠাল বুড়ির বাগান) is a Bangladeshi children's film released in 1988. It stars Tareen Jahan in the lead role and Subarna Mustafa and Humayun Faridi in supporting roles. It is the debut film of Tareen. It was directed by Badal Rahman.

== Cast ==
- Suborna Mustafa
- Tareen Jahan
- Humayun Faridi
- Dilara Zaman

== Music ==
Palabi Kothay

Soundtrack album by Syed Abdul Hadi, Chitra Sultana, Dodul and Shukla Acharya
- Released: 1997
- Genre: Film music
- Language: Bengali

Palabi Kothay Soundtrack – Track listing
No.	Title	Lyrics	Singers	Length
1.	"Chora Re Tor Sahos Koto"	Debashis Sarkar	Chitra Sultana
2.	"Ami Toh Bhai Adha Pagol"	Debashis Sarkar	Syed Abdul Hadi
