= Dorothy Burritt =

Canadian film society organizer and experimental filmmaker

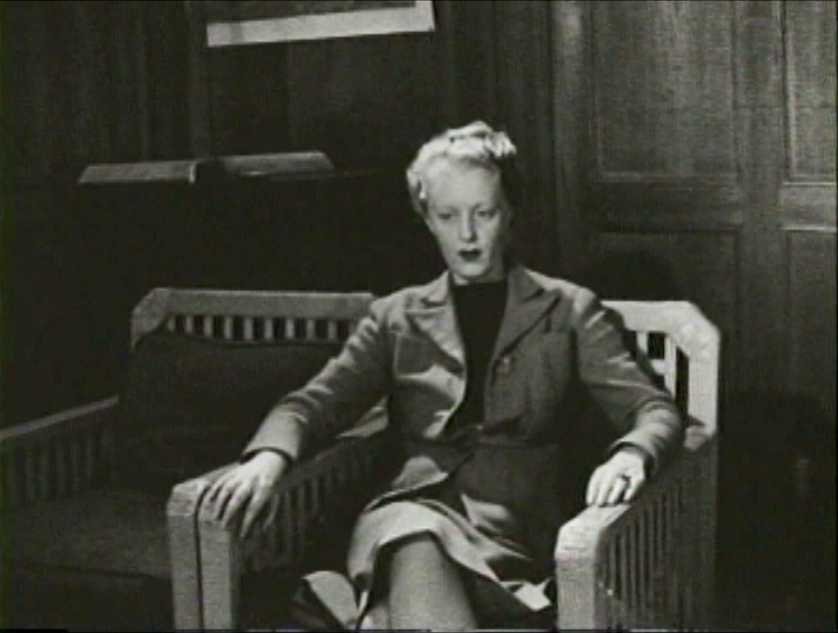
- Dorothy Burritt poses for a portrait in her film Suite Two (1947)
- Born: Dorothy McLellan Fowler; 1910; Vancouver, British Columbia, Canada
- Died: September 11, 1963 (aged 52–53); Toronto, Ontario, Canada
- Occupation: film society organizer
- Years active: 1940-1963

Dorothy Burritt [née Fowler] (1910–1963) was a cinéaste, an experimental filmmaker, and a principal architect of the Canadian film society movement. In the 1930s, she was active in the Vancouver Branch of the National Film Society of Canada (VB/NFSC), which later became the Vancouver Film Society. In 1946, she co-founded the Film Survey Group of the Labor Arts Guild. She was also a co-founder of the Toronto Film Society (TFS) and the Canadian Federation of Film Societies (CFFS).

As an amateur filmmaker in Vancouver, Dorothy Burritt also created a few pioneering works of Canadian avant-garde cinema.

== In the Vancouver film community (ca. 1936–1947) ==
In the late 1930s, UBC graduate Dorothy Fowler became involved with the Vancouver Branch of the NFSC, attending its regular public screenings of classic and foreign films. There she struck up a friendship with Oscar C. Burritt, the society's manager and co-founder, who became a kind of mentor for the world of cinema. In a film shot by Burritt, Fowler can be seen attending an April 1940 VB/NFSC screening at the Stanley Theatre on Vancouver's Granville Street.

=== Early films ===
An avid amateur filmmaker, Burritt encouraged Fowler to explore the medium. Working with Margaret Roberts, she produced "and–", the earliest known experimental film made in Vancouver, and among the first produced in Canada. On a Labour Day weekend excursion to Galiano Island, Burritt, Fowler, and Roberts also filmed an "experimental travelogue/memoir," Three There: Galiano Island 1940. These personal films, made principally for their makers' experience and enjoyment, were probably screened for select audiences through the film society.

During the Second World War, the Vancouver Branch of the NFSC suspended operations. Dorothy Fowler, who had been working for the VB/NFSC, got an administrative job at the Vancouver office of the National Film Board of Canada. She married Oscar Burritt on 10 January 1942. In 1943, Oscar was hired by producer Leon C. Shelly of Vancouver Motion Pictures (VMP) and became a professional cinematographer and director of sponsored films and documentaries. After the war, Shelly rebranded VMP as Shelley Films and began planning to move his operation to Toronto. The Burritts moved there in 1947.

=== Vancouver Film Survey Group ===
Oscar's VMP colleague Lew Parry remembered Dorothy as “something of an artiste” who was interested in “arty things, arty groups, discussions on philosophy and all that sort of thing.” In 1946, she joined with film society members Moira Armour, Vernon van Sickle, and painter Jack Shadbolt to create the Vancouver Film Survey Group of the Labor Arts Guild. The Film Survey Group built on the legacy and goodwill of the NFSC to present an ambitious program of silent, classic, and international films. Stanley Fox recalled: "There was to be a Main Series at the Paradise Theatre downtown and a Silent Series at the John Goss Studio Theatre."

Fox and his high school classmate Allan King became involved with the Film Survey Group, serving as projectionists and disc jockeys (for the live performance of the silent film soundtracks); both men were mentored by Dorothy Burritt. "The Group" drew on progressive notions about art, cinema, and leftist political thought. Unfortunately, the Film Survey Group of the Labour Arts Guild lasted barely two years. In 1947, the Vancouver Branch of the NFSC came back from its hiatus and took over the screenings.

=== Suite Two: A Memo to Oscar (1947 film) ===
The Burritts' Vancouver apartment was a suite in an old mansion on Robson Street near Stanley Park, and the mansion was slated to be demolished. In June 1947, Dorothy Burritt collaborated with 19-year-old Stanley Fox to make her most elaborate film, Suite Two: A Memo to Oscar. At the time, Oscar Burritt was in Toronto, helping prepare for the opening of Shelley Films there.

Suite Two was made by Dorothy to document their Vancouver home and the community of artistic friends who regularly gathered there. In the film, she prepares the apartment for company, assisted by an unexplained figure in a giant bird costume who serves as her butler. She later poses for a portrait by Estonian-born painter Peter Bortkus (1906–1995). In the evening, she welcomes visitors (including film librarian Moira Armour, film editor Maureen Balfe, photographer Peter Varley, and clairvoyant Nettie Gendall) for drinks, conversation, and dancing. The film's cinematographer, Stanley Fox, also appears on-camera as the evening's projectionist, screening a feature film: Sacha Guitry's historical comedy The Pearls of the Crown (1937).

At the first annual presentation of the Canadian Film Awards in 1949, Suite Two received honourable mention in the amateur category. In 1986, Stanley Fox donated the original 16-millimetre edited reversal picture of Suite Two to the British Columbia Archives in Victoria.

== Toronto (1947–1963) ==
Moving to Toronto later in 1947, Dorothy and Oscar Burritt became closely involved in creating the Toronto Film Study Group, which became the Toronto Film Society (TFS) in 1950. Dorothy was also co-founder and liaison officer of the Canadian Federation of Film Societies (CFFS). She was tremendously influential in the realms of Canadian arthouse cinema, film appreciation, and film distribution. The Toronto Star noted: "At least one Canadian distributor never bought a foreign film without getting her opinion, and she was instrumental in getting a general release for many films which the commercial distributors would otherwise have passed by."

In 1951, the TFS brought the renowned American avant-garde filmmaker Maya Deren to Toronto to produce an experimental dance film. Dorothy Burritt and her colleague Moira Armour organized the intensive workshop that collaborated with their visiting artist at Toronto's Sovereign Studios. The unfinished Deren project, Ensemble for Somnambulists, was shown only once to TFS members. Dissatisfied with the film, Deren never released it, and later remade it as The Very Eye of Night (1952–58).

After a life fully engaged with cinema, culture, and the arts, Dorothy McLellan Burritt died on 11 September 1963 at the age of 53. At her death, it was noted that she had "helped virtually every film organization in Canada." The celebrated Canadian film director Allan King called her "a remarkable heroine of film culture in Canada."

== Legacy ==
At the presentation of the 15th Canadian Film Awards in May 1963, Dorothy and Oscar Burritt received a Special Award for their "pioneering work over three decades in contributing to the development of appreciation of film in Canada." Their integral contribution to the history of the Toronto Film Society is described in a 1999 monograph published by the society.

In 1964, the Canadian Federation of Film Societies created the Dorothy Burritt Memorial Award. In 1974, following Oscar's death, it was renamed the Dorothy and Oscar Burritt Memorial Award. The award, later administered by the Toronto Film Society, provided an annual cash grant towards projects that fostered “greater understanding and enjoyment of film as an art." The Burritts are remembered as essential players in the Canadian film society movement.
