= Oscar C. Burritt =

Canadian filmmaker and broadcaster

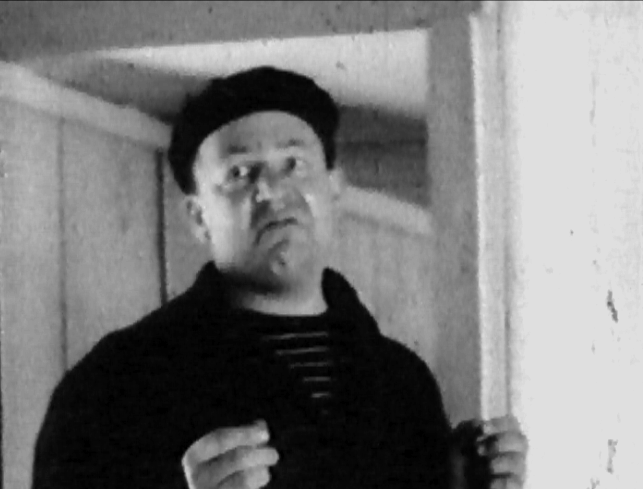
Oscar Burritt mugging for the camera in the experimental film "and–" (ca. 1940–41).

Oscar C. Burritt (1908–1974) was a Canadian cinéaste, cinematographer, documentary film director and editor, and television film consultant. In the 1930s, while working as a lino- and carpet-layer for his family's Vancouver business (Burritt Brothers Carpets), he became keenly interested in international cinema, eventually becoming a self-taught expert on the subject. Burritt's filmmaking efforts began with some accomplished amateur films made in the years 1938–1944. Later, as a film professional, he served in key roles at Vancouver Motion Pictures, Shelley Films, and the Canadian Broadcasting Corporation's Toronto television station, CBLT.

== In the Vancouver film community (1936-47) ==
In 1936, Oscar Burritt became a board member of the Vancouver Branch of the National Film Society of Canada, which would become the Vancouver Film Society following the Second World War. Burritt managed the film society from 1939 to 1942. Through the society's regular screenings at venues like the Stanley Theatre, he was exposed to a very wide range of World cinema. Inspired, he began making his own 16-millimetre amateur films in the late 1930s, often in collaboration with his friend Dorothy Fowler, another society member. Burritt became a skilled cinematographer and a self-taught film technician; he processed his exposed 16-millimetre film using his own home-built processing and printing equipment.

Ultimately, Burritt became a professional filmmaker, joining Vancouver Motion Pictures (VMP) in 1943 to work as a cinematographer, editor, and director of industrial films and National Film Board of Canada (NFB) documentaries. One important VMP-produced NFB film he directed was Of Japanese Descent (1945), which dealt with the internment of Japanese-Canadians during the Second World War. In 1945, he also directed a pair of films about BC's salmon and herring fisheries for British Columbia Packers Limited.

Burritt was well-regarded for his technical and photographic acumen. His VMP colleague Lew Parry (later Vancouver's most prolific industrial film producer) remembered his helpful insights. "Oscar knew more about the technique of filmmaking than anybody. And I needed that. [He] would go to great lengths to put me 'in tune with the infinite.'"

== Toronto (1947-1974) ==
In 1947, he moved to Toronto with his wife Dorothy Burritt [née Fowler]. Burritt continued working for Shelley Films until 1950, when he joined the Canadian Broadcasting Corporation to work in television for the rest of his career. O. C. Wilson—who had also preceded Burritt as manager of the National Film Society (Vancouver Branch)—hired him to manage film services at CBLT Toronto, two years before the station went on the air. According to the Toronto Star, "Burritt was one of a small group who planned the first CBC television programs in CBC Toronto."

As the Supervisor of Distribution and Film Evaluation for the CBC's National Film Service, Burritt was involved in the acquisition and versioning of films for broadcast, as well as the training of new film personnel. In the 1960s, he also appeared on-camera, hosting broadcasts of vintage and artistic movies on the CBLT programs Cine Club, Cinema Six, and Canadian Film Makers. As TFS member Fraser Macdonald pointed out, viewers may have wondered about the identity of "that baldheaded man . . . who looked surprisingly like the TV puppet character Uncle Chichimus."

Burritt retired from the CBC in 1973, a year before his death.

== Legacy ==
With his wife and creative partner Dorothy Burritt (1910–1963), Oscar Burritt was instrumental in creating the Toronto Film Study Group, which became the Toronto Film Society in 1950. Their integral contribution to the history of the TFS is described in a 1999 monograph published by the society. At the presentation of the 15th Canadian Film Awards in May 1963, Dorothy and Oscar Burritt received a Special Award for their "pioneering work over three decades in contributing to the development of appreciation of film in Canada."

In 1964, the Canadian Federation of Film Societies created the Dorothy Burritt Memorial Award; in 1974, it was renamed the Dorothy and Oscar Burritt Memorial Award. It provided an annual cash grant towards projects that fostered “greater understanding and enjoyment of film as an art.”

The Burritts are remembered as key architects of the Canadian film society movement.

== Key amateur films ==
Some of the Burritt amateur films listed below are described and discussed in the Amateur Movie Database (AMDB) or in the article "Evangelists," cited under 'External links" below.

- Pier D fire, Vancouver (1938)
- May Day parade, Vancouver (1938)
- Stanley Park (Coast Films, 1939)
- National Film Society of Canada (Vancouver Branch), Fourth Season 1940, Ninth Performance… (1940)
- Three There: Galiano Island 1940 (1940, with Dorothy Fowler and Margaret Roberts)
- "and–" (by Dorothy Fowler and Margaret Roberts, ca. 1940–41) - contributed found footage; editor (uncredited)
- Chinese theatre performance, Vancouver (February 1944)
- Cinemaorgy (Toronto Film Society, 1955)

== Notable work at Vancouver Motion Pictures (as director) ==
- Tomorrow's Timber (for the National Film Board, sponsored by Dominion Forest Service/Mines and Resources Canada, 1944)
- Salmon for Food (for BC Packers Ltd., ca. 1945)
- The Herring Hunters (for BC Packers Ltd., ca. 1945)
- Of Japanese Descent: An Interim Report (for the National Film Board, sponsored by the Canadian Department of Labour, 1945)

== Notable work at Shelley Films (Toronto) ==
- Salmon Run (for National Film Board, 1945) – cinematographer
- Red Runs the Fraser [a short version of the above title] (for National Film Board, 1948) – cinematographer
- Beans of Bounty* (for Victory Mills, 1949) - director
- Timagami Ranger (for Ontario Dept. of Lands and Forests, [ca. 1946–50]) - director
- Farm Forestry (for Ontario Dept. of Lands and Forests, [ca. 1946–50) - director/writer

* At the 1st Canadian Film Awards ceremony in 1949, Beans of Bounty won the award for Best Non-Theatrical, Live-Action Film (Documentary).
