= Notun Kuri =

- নতুন কুঁড়ি
- Genre: Talent contest
- Created by: Mustafa Monwar
- Presented by: Masuma Khatun; Mustafa Monwar
- Country of origin: Bangladesh
- Original language: Bengali

Production
- Executive producer: Kazi Kayum

Original release
- Network: Pakistan Television (1966-1971); Bangladesh Television (1976-2006; 2025 - present)
- Release: 1966

Notun Kuri (Bengali: নতুন কুঁড়ি, lit. 'New Bud') is a Bangladeshi reality television competition series for child artistes created by Mustafa Monwar. It was first launched in 1966 on Pakistan Television, where it was broadcast live on a limited scale. At that time, the program was not presented as a talent search competition in the modern sense for children and adolescents. After the independence of Bangladesh, in 1976, the show was revived on Bangladesh Television (BTV) under the direction of Mustafa Monwar as a national television competition, continuing until 2005.

The program’s title was taken from the poem Kishore (“Adolescent”) by poet (and Monwar's father) Golam Mostofa, the first fifteen lines of which were used as the show’s opening theme song.

== Judges ==
- Anil Kishon Sinha

== Talented children raised from Notun Kuri ==
Winners of the show were child artists like Tarana Halim, Rumana Rashid Ishita, Tarin Ahmed, Meher Afroz Shaon, Firoz Mahmud, Sabrin Saka Meem and Nusrat Imroz Tisha.

- Tamalika Karmakar (dance)
- Mehbooba Mahnoor Chandni (dance)
- Samina Chowdhury (singing) 1977
- Azad Rahman Shakil (Master Shakil, film actor)
- Firoz Mahmud (Art/painting)
- Tareen Jahan (acting, dancing and storytelling divisions)
- Rumana Rashid Ishita (dance, song, Art, acting)
- Tisha (actress) (Acting)
- Sabrin Saka Meem (Acting)
