= Sabrin Saka Meem =

Bangladeshi actress and television news presenter

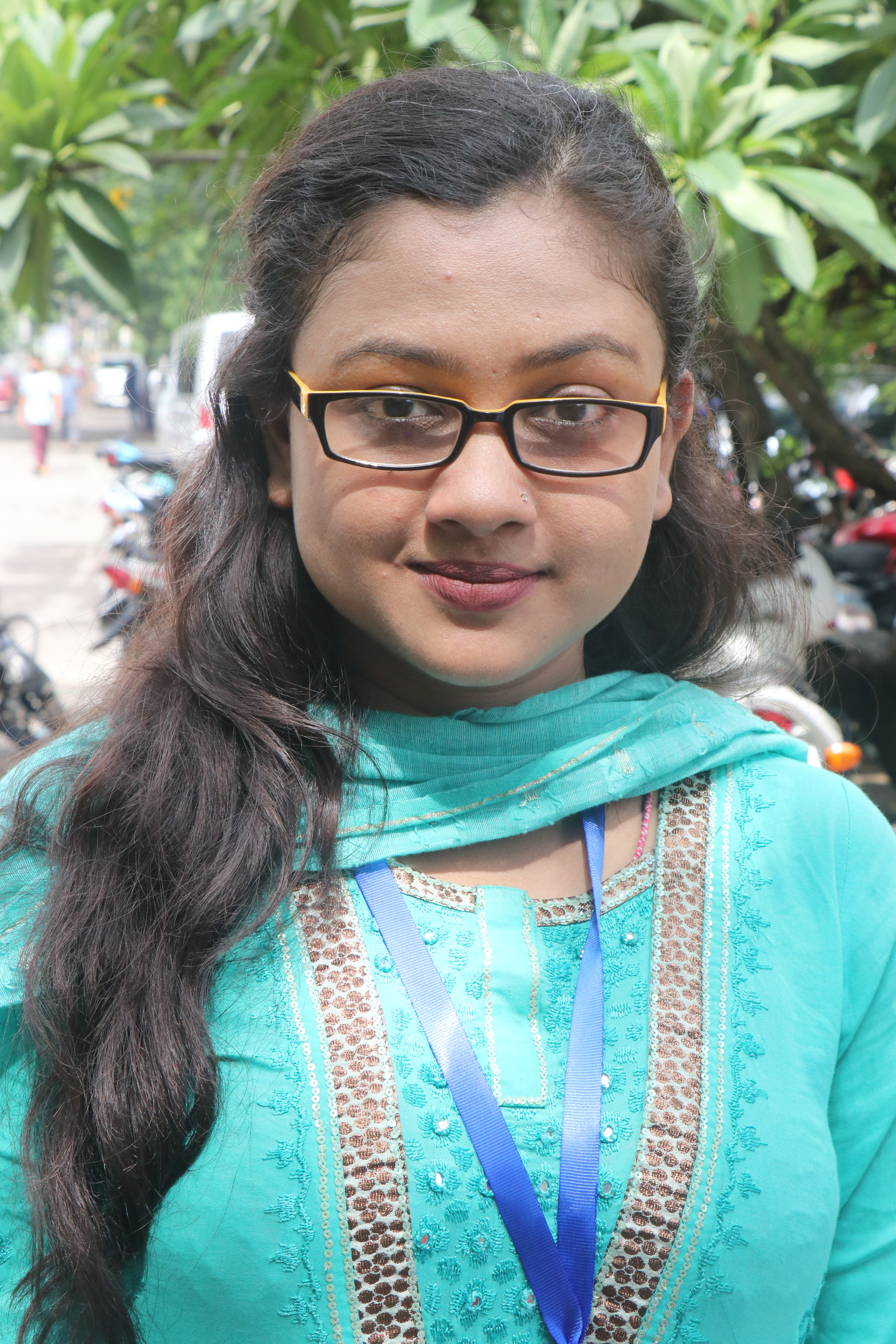
- Meem, 2019
- Occupations: Actress, news presenter
- Known for: Notun Kuri champion

Sabrin Saka Meem is a Bangladeshi actress and television news presenter.

== Biography ==
Meem's birthday is June 25. Her parents are both doctors. Her younger sister, Sharmin Saka Tuktuki, would also go on to be a doctor.

Meem first performed on television in 1991, when she was in class 1. The next year, she started acting in television dramas. She was a champion in the national children's talent contest Notun Kuri in 1995. She went on hiatus from media in 2011.

Meem completed her education from Dhaka University. She married Shahriar Ahmed Sajib on December 7, 2012.

In 2013, she became a television news presenter at ATN News, and more recently, she has been a newsreader for RTV.

Now she is working with ActionAid Bangladesh's child sponsorship team.
