= And (film) =

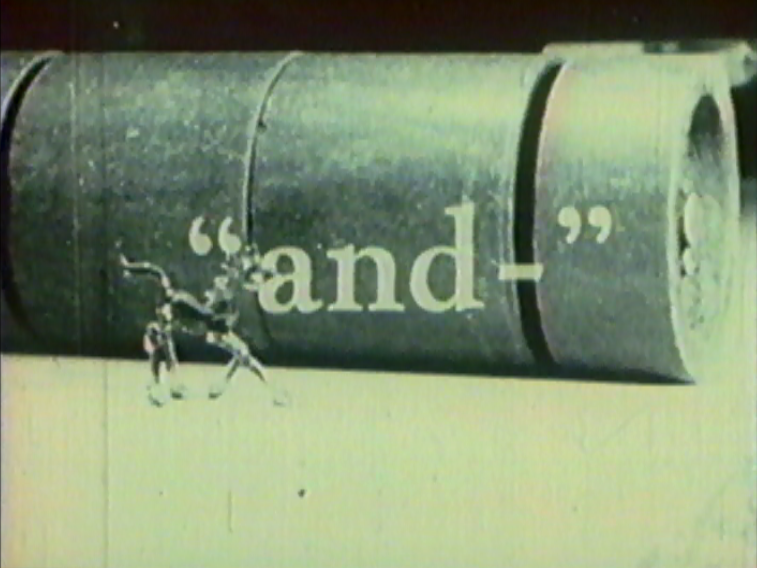
Title frame of the film "and–" (1940-41).

“and–” is an experimental film by Dorothy Fowler and Margaret Roberts, who made it in Vancouver, British Columbia, circa 1940–41. Fowler and Roberts were members of the Vancouver Branch of the National Film Society of Canada (VB/NFSC). "and–” is the earliest known experimental film made in Vancouver, and among the earliest produced in Canada.

== Production ==
"and–” is a collage film; it utilizes some pre-existing film footage by amateur filmmaker Oscar C. Burritt, another member of the VB/NFSC. (For instance, the “producers” credit in "and–" runs over an out-take from his midget-racing-car film "Bats Out of Hell," shot in July 1940.) This found footage—including negative film stock, inverted (reversed) images, and random camera movements—was combined with Fowler and Roberts' newly hand-painted and scratched stock. In some cases, their hand-painting carried over onto the found footage as well.

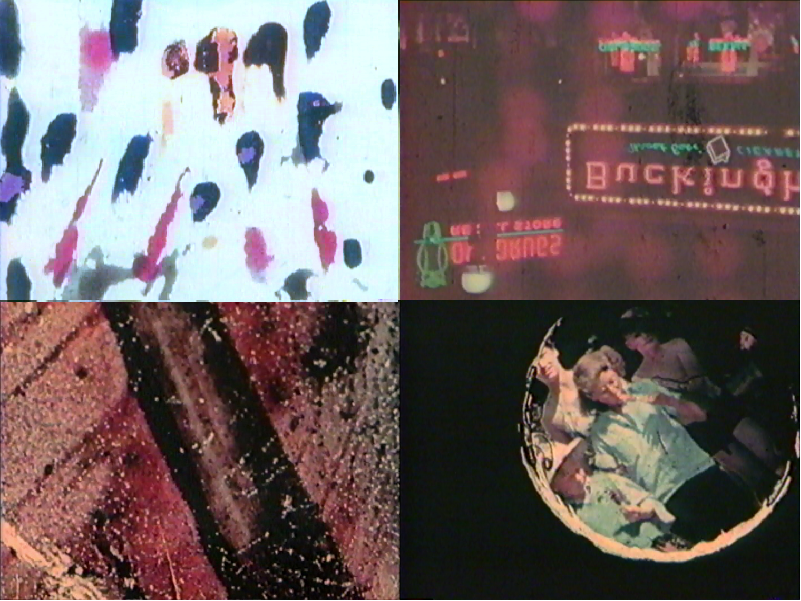
A selection of frames from "and-" illustrating the techniques used.

The technique of painting and scratching directly onto film stock later became widely identified with Norman McLaren of the National Film Board of Canada (NFB). However, "and–" was clearly inspired by the earlier work of Len Lye, whose pioneering short A Colour Box (1935) had been screened by the film society. "and–" is particularly significant because it was made before (or simultaneously with) McLaren's arrival at the NFB. The found footage and the hand-painted material were brought together by Oscar Burritt, who served as the editor of "and–" but didn't take credit for his role.

== Presentation ==
The only published mention of the film from the period it was made refers to a screening at the University of British Columbia on 30 January 1942. It seems likely that the film was also shown at a regular screening of the VB/NFSC. Preserved today in silent form, the film was originally presented with a soundtrack of swing music from phonograph records, mixed “live” on a dual turntable set-up owned by the film society. The tracks used included Benny Goodman’s “Sing, Sing, Sing” and Bud Freeman’s "China Boy" and “The Eel."

== The Burritts ==
Dorothy Fowler and Oscar Burritt were married in January 1942. Moving to Toronto in 1947, they helped to found the Toronto Film Study Group (which became the Toronto Film Society in 1950). Dorothy Burritt (1910–1963) was co-founder and liaison officer of the Canadian Federation of Film Societies. The Dorothy Burritt Memorial Award was created in 1964 by the Canadian Federation of Film Societies, then renamed in 1974 to honour both Dorothy and Oscar Burritt. It provided an annual cash grant towards projects that foster “greater understanding and enjoyment of film as an art.”

== Preservation status ==
"and–" remained in the Burritts' hands until Oscar Burritt died in 1974. Largely forgotten, the film was rarely mentioned in print. One exception is a reference in a 1984 John Porter article in the arts magazine Vanguard. The original 16-millimetre edited picture roll of "and–” was copied to produce a duplicate negative, which is now preserved in the Douglas Wilson film collection at Library and Archives Canada in Ottawa. The same collection also includes Three There: Galiano Island 1940 (by Burritt, Fowler, and Roberts) and Cinemaorgy (1955) (by Oscar Burritt).

Another early experimental film work, apparently related to "and–", is residue 2, which is credited to "Angus Hanson" (a pseudonym used by Oscar Burritt). This film was found among Oscar Burritt's possessions after his death. A 1-inch videotape master of residue 2 is preserved at the BC Archives/Royal BC Museum.
