= Anisur Rahman Anis =

Bangladeshi actor (c.1940–2019)

- আনিসুর রহমান আনিস
- Born: 1940; Jalpaiguri, Bengal Presidency, British India
- Died: 28 April 2019 (aged 78–79); Dhaka, Bangladesh
- Occupation: Actor
- Spouse: Kulsum Ara Begum (m. 1965; died 2013)
- Children: 2

Anisur Rahman Anis (c. 1940 – 28 April 2019) was a Bangladeshi film, television and theatre actor who acted in more than 250 films. He was known for acting in comic roles.

== Early life and career ==
Anisur Rahman Anis was born in Jalpaiguri District in 1940. His country house is situated in South Ballavpur, Chhagalnaiya, Feni. He entered into Dhallywood with Bishkonya in 1960 which was an unreleased film. His first released film was Eito Jibon which was released in 1964. Jemon Jamai Temon Bou was his last film. He also acted in television and theatre. He was known for playing the character Golam Hossain in the play Nawab Sirajuddoula in the theatre arena of Bangladesh.

== Personal life and death ==
Anis married his cousin Kulsum Ara Begum in 1965. She died in 2013. They had two daughters.

Anis died on 28 April 2019 at the age of 78.

== Selected filmography ==
- Bishkonna (unreleased)
- Eito Jibon (1964)
- Paisay (1964)
- Mala (1965)
- Zarina Sundori (1966)
- Odhikar
- Ujan Bhati
- Talak
- Barud
- Ongar
- Lal Kajol
- Jongli Meye (1967)
- Chena Achena (1968)
- Madhumala (1968)
- Roopban Roopkatha (1968)
- Rakhan Bandhu (1968)
- Payal (1970)
- Puroskar
- Nirdosh
- Sanai
- Vanumoti
- Surjo Othar Age
- Ghor Songsar
- Emiler Goenda Bahini (1980)
- Padma Nadir Majhi (1992)
- Jemon Jamai Temon Bou
