= Emiler Goenda Bahini =

Bangladeshi feature film

- এমিলের গোয়েন্দা বাহিনী
- Directed by: Badal Rahman
- Based on: Emil and the Detectives by Erich Kästner
- Starring: Golam Mustafa; ATM Shamsuzzaman; Sara Zaker; Sharmili Ahmed
- Release date: 1980
- Running time: 125 min
- Country: Bangladesh
- Language: Bangla
- Budget: 11,50000 BDT

Emiler Goenda Bahini is a 1980 Bangladeshi feature film directed by Badal Rahman. It is based on German writer Erich Kästner's 1929 novel Emil and the Detectives. The film won Bangladesh National Film Awards for Best Film, Best Supporting Actor, Best Child Artist, Best Cinematographer (Color) and Best Editing.

== Cast ==
- Partho Shahid as Emil
- Golam Mustafa
- ATM Shamsuzzaman
- Sharmili Ahmed
- Ataur Rahman
- Dr. Enamul Haque
- Sara Zaker
- Anisur Rahman Anis
- Syed Lutfur Rahman

== Accolades ==
Bangladesh National Film Awards

- Bangladesh National Film Award for Best Film
- Bangladesh National Film Award for Best Supporting Actor
- Bangladesh National Film Award for Best Child Artist
- Bangladesh National Film Award for Best Cinematographer (Color)
- Bangladesh National Film Award for Best Editor
