= The Vancouver Film Society =

Canadian film society and cultural organization

The Vancouver Film Society was one of Canada's most active and significant film societies from the mid-1930s to the early 1970s. It began as the Vancouver Branch of the National Film Society of Canada (VB/NFSC), founded in the spring of 1936. (The National Film Society of Canada itself had been inaugurated just one year earlier.) The first president of the Vancouver branch was UBC professor Dr. David O. Evans. Among those instrumental in founding the branch were Garfield A. King (director of the Progressive Arts Club of Vancouver) and O. C. Wilson, who became the branch's first secretary-manager. Oscar C. Burritt and treasurer Clarence Darling also played very active roles.

== Early Screenings (1936-1940) ==
The society's first public screening took place on 30 September 1936 in the Little Theatre at 637 Commercial Drive. The program featured G. W. Pabst's Kameradschaft (1931), J. S. Watson and Melville Webber's surrealist short Lot in Sodom (1933), the travel film The Cathedrals of Paris, and the cartoon "Klop", or The Master of Experience, by the Soviet animator Aleksandr Ptushko. The entire program was presented in 35-millimetre prints.

Due to the unexpected public interest in the society's screenings, it began seeking a larger venue almost immediately. In November 1936, the VB/NFSC received permission from the City of Vancouver to hold Sunday afternoon shows at the Stanley Theatre on Granville Street, beginning with its third presentation on November 29.

In early 1937, the VB/NFSC briefly published the magazine Film Bulletin, a five-cent publication billed as "an intelligent guide to film-goers." The society grew significantly in the late 1930s; its paid membership of more than a thousand (by September 1938) made the Vancouver branch the largest in Canada.

According to longtime member Stanley Fox: "The remarkable thing about the prewar society was how very progressive it was, for its time. They were bringing in important films in the Thirties, and they had a gigantic membership of, I was told, eleven hundred people. They used to use the Stanley Theatre, a large cinema, and obviously run in 35-millimetre. They were well-supported and popular. And course, one can understand why; at that time, they would be the only possible way you could see foreign films. So anyone who had the slightest interest in foreign film would take advantage of the showing and go."

In August 1939, cinéaste and amateur filmmaker Oscar C. Burritt replaced O.C. Wilson as manager of the VB/NFSC. The genuine popularity of the screenings is demonstrated in a reel of film footage by Burritt, which shows the large turnout for a Sunday afternoon show at the Stanley in April 1940.

The Corporate Registry file for the VB/NFSC indicates that the society was inactive during much of the Second World War, from the fiscal year ending 31 May 1941 to 31 May 1947.

Despite the above, the National Film Society (the parent organization, presumably) collaborated with the National Film Board in 1942 to assemble a Vancouver lending library of information films about the Allied war effort. The library included the NFB's "Canada Carries On" series, plus selected wartime titles from the United States, Australia, and Britain's Ministry of Information. The films could be accessed through the Vancouver School Board and the UBC Film Society, as well as through the local booking agent for the NFS, Dorothy Fowler [Burritt].

== The Film Survey Group of the Labor Arts Guild ==
In 1946, a group of film society members—including Moira Armour, Dorothy Burritt, painter Jack Shadbolt, and Vernon van Sickle—started the Film Survey Group of the Labor Arts Guild. The Film Survey Group "borrowed" the goodwill of the VB/NFSC to present an engaging program of silent, classic, and international films. The Main Series was presented in 35-millimetre prints at the Paradise Theatre on Granville Street. The Silent Series, shown at the John Goss Studio Theatre down the street, featured classics of European silent film in 16-millimetre prints, accompanied by carefully selected music from 78-rpm phonograph records. This series included such key films as The Cabinet of Dr. Caligari, Metropolis, The Last Laugh, and The Passion of Joan of Arc.

The Film Survey Group was a pioneering effort to bring together ideas about art, cinema, and leftist political thought, and an attempt to reach a broader audience with arthouse cinema. Unfortunately, the group lasted little over a year; as it turned out, the program was too ambitious. By March 1947, the Main Series had been cancelled; only the John Goss Studio screenings continued.

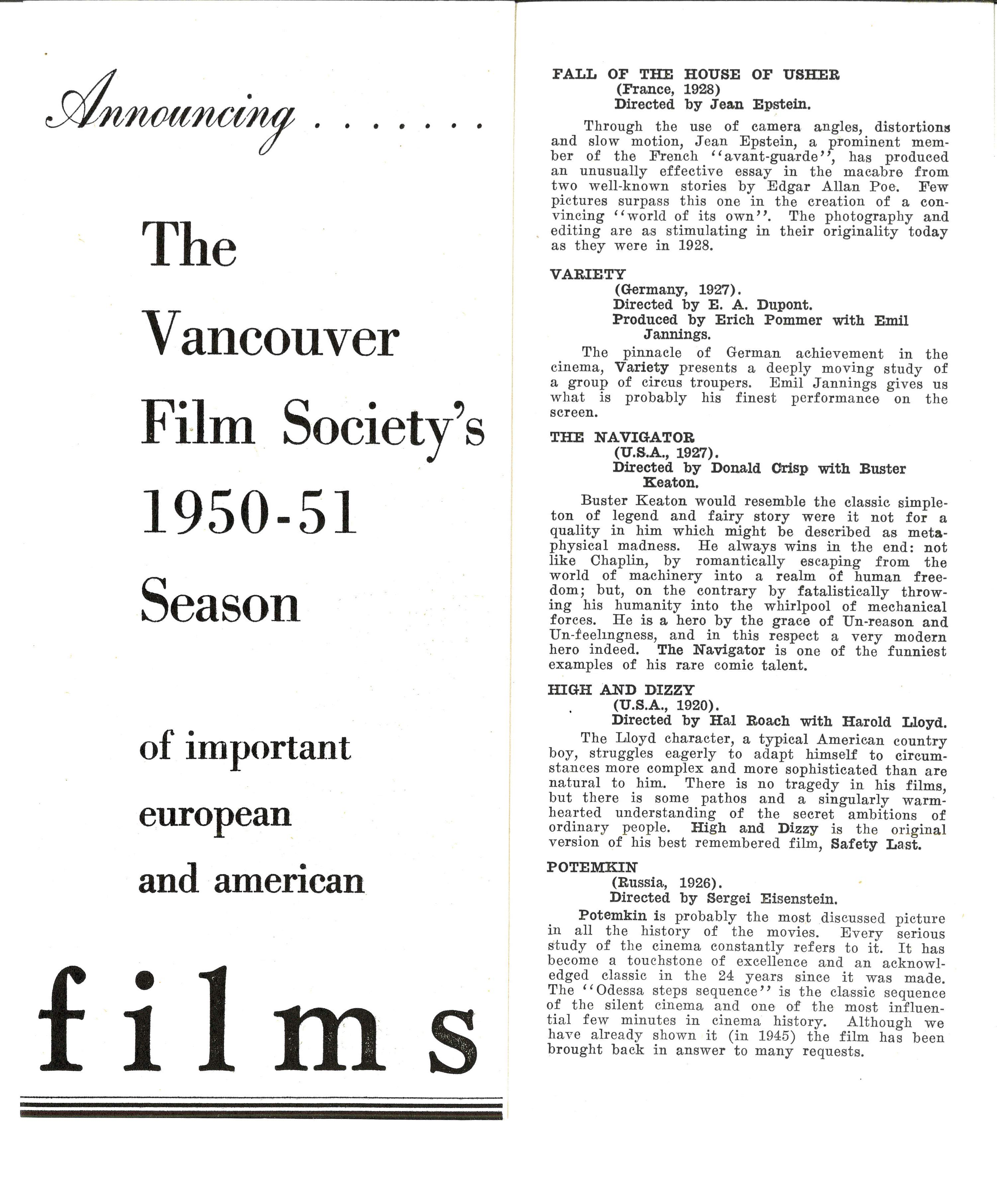
A brochure for the film society's 1950–51 season shows the ambitious range of its programming—including Eisenstein's Battleship Potemkin (1925), Buster Keaton's The Navigator (1927), and Epstein's Fall of the House of Usher (1928).

== Postwar Revival ==
The film society regrouped in June 1947, undertaking a new series of screenings at the Pender Auditorium, popularly known as "Boilermakers' Hall." On 11 September 1950, the VB/NFSC was officially renamed "The Vancouver Film Society." In the ensuing years, its board of directors contained a cross-section of the city's artistic-intellectual community: Shadbolt, Armour, future architect Peter Cotton, journalist and broadcaster Clyde Gilmour, art photographer Forbes Helem, noted bookseller Merwyn "Binky" Marks, and CBC Vancouver filmmakers Arla Saare, Allan King, and Stanley Fox. The society was dissolved in 1953, but a second incarnation remained active from 1955 through the mid-1970s.

In the early 1950s, the VFS gained access to the Christmas Seal Auditorium at Vancouver General Hospital—a comfortable theatre with first-rate projection facilities. It was there that novelist Malcolm Lowry and his wife Margerie Bonner attended film society screenings in the early 1950s, as described in Lowry's posthumously published October Ferry to Gabriola (1970).

At the end of 1970, the Vancouver Film Society was described as "one of the most active and progressive in Canada." The society was still showing films at the Christmas Seal Auditorium as late as January 1976.

== Legacy ==
It was quite true that, in the 1930s, the film society was "the only possible way you could see foreign films" in Vancouver, and this situation likely persisted at least into the late 1950s. It began to change with the limited North American commercial release of landmark films like Akira Kurosawa's Rashomon (1950), Francois Truffaut's The 400 Blows (1959), and Jean-Luc Godard's Breathless (1960).

The film society's exhibition and education role in Vancouver was eventually supplanted by the Pacific Cinémathèque Pacifique, founded in 1972. The 1970s and 1980s also saw the establishment or conversion of several second-run, revival, or repertory cinemas, expanding the number of art film venues in Vancouver. The re-launching of the Vancouver International Film Festival in 1982 provided another significant outlet for international and art cinema. The film society gradually lost its exclusive cultural status.

A search of Vancouver newspapers reveals no advertisements and only rare listings for Vancouver Film Society events after February 1976. BC's Corporate Registry dissolved the society on 25 March 1982, after an ongoing failure to file annual reports.
