= Dukhai =

- DVD cover of Dukhai
- দুখাই
- Directed by: Morshedul Islam
- Written by: Morshedul Islam
- Screenplay by: MA Mobin
- Produced by: Morshedul Islam
- Starring: Raisul Islam Asad; Rokeya Prachy; Nusrat Anwar Nishi; Mehbooba Mahnoor Chandni
- Edited by: Boshir Hossain
- Release date: 1997
- Country: Bangladesh
- Language: Bengali

Dukhai (Bengali: দুখাই) is a 1997 Bangladeshi film written and directed by Morshedul Islam. The film got National Film Awards in 9 different categories.

== Plot ==
This film shows the struggle of the people of the shore in the face of a natural calamity.

== Cast ==
- Raisul Islam Asad
- Rokeya Prachy
- Nusrat Anwar Nishi
- Mehbooba Mahnoor Chandni
- Nazma Anwar
- Amirul Haq Chowdhury

== Soundtrack ==
The music of this film was directed by Pulak Gupta.

== Awards ==
Award Title	Category	Awardee	Result
National Film Awards	Best Film	Morshedul Islam (Producer)	Won
National Film Awards	Best Actor	Raisul Islam Asad	Won
National Film Awards	Best Actor in a Supporting Role	Abul Khair	Won
National Film Awards	Best Actress in a Supporting Role	Rokeya Prachy	Won
National Film Awards	Best Child Artist	Nusrat Anwar Nishi	Won
National Film Awards	Best Male Playback Singer	Kiran Chandra Roy	Won
National Film Awards	Best Screenplay	MA Mobin	Won
National Film Awards	Best Art Direction	Mohiuddin Faruque	Won
National Film Awards	Best Makeup	Moyajjem Hossain	Won
