= Ranesh Dasgupta Film Society =

Bangladesh cultural organization

Ranesh Dasgupta Film Society was established in 2008. This was named after writer and cultural activist Ranesh Das Gupta. Moshiah Uddin Shaker was the founder president and Arafatul Kabir Rizvi was founder general secretary of this film Society

== Activities ==
Ranesh Dasgupta Film Society works for free and liberal cultural film society activism. It arranged several seminal, festival and film making workshop on regular interval. In 2015, Raneh Dasgupta Film society and Bangladesh Shilpakala Academy jointly organized Muktopran Film festival 2015. Independent film makers participated in this festival.
