= 1st Canadian Film Awards =

Canadian film award ceremony

- Date: April 27, 1949
- Location: Little Elgin Theatre, Ottawa, Ontario
- Hosted by: Robert Winters

The 1st Canadian Film Awards were presented on April 27, 1949 to honour achievements in Canadian film.

The awards came into being at a May 1947 conference of forty-four organizations connected to the Canadian Association for Adult Education, where it was decided that awards should be given to distinguished Canadian radio programs and films. The awards should be similar in stature to the Governor General Awards for Literature, and they should raise standards in film and radio, help Canadians understand the work of Canadian artists and broadcasters, and recognize Canadian creative effort.

It was eventually agreed that there would be Canadian Radio Awards, and Canadian Film Awards, and that the physical prizes would be Canadian paintings. For the first awards presentations, twenty-eight short films and one full-length film were entered. The prize to each winner was an original painting by a Canadian artist, valued at $50.00. The ceremony, which took place at Ottawa's Little Elgin Theatre, was hosted by politician Robert Winters.

== Winners ==
- Film of the Year: The Loon's Necklace — Crawley Films, F.R. Crawley producer and director
- Non-Theatrical, Live-Action (Documentary): Beans of Bounty — Shelley Films, Leon C. Shelly producer, Oscar C. Burritt director

Feeling of Hostility — National Film Board of Canada, Robert Anderson producer and director
Drug Addict — National Film Board of Canada, Robert Anderson producer and director

- Theatrical Short: Who Will Teach Your Child? — National Film Board of Canada, Gudrun Parker and Tom Daly producers, Stanley Jackson director

Theatrical Short, Honourable Mention: Canadian Cameo Series — Associated Screen Studios, Bernard Norrish producer, Gordon Sparling director

- Non-Theatrical, Animated: Chantons Noël — National Film Board of Canada, Jim MacKay producer, Jean-Paul Ladouceur director

Honourable Mention: Suite Two, A Memo to Oscar — Dorothy Burritt and Stanley Fox directors
Honourable Mention: Making a Life Mask — Louis Shore producer, Judith Crawley director

- Amateur: Not awarded
- Special Awards:

- Dots and Loops, National Film Board of Canada, Norman McLaren producer and director — "in recognition of the experimental work of Norman McLaren in the field of animation".
- Un homme et son péché (A Man and His Sin), Quebec Productions Corp., Paul L'Anglais producer — "for making a definite advance in Canadian film history".
