= Dressing Table =

2016 film by Abu Sayeed

- Poster
- Bengali: ড্রেসিং টেবিল
- Directed by: Abu Sayeed (film director)
- Written by: Abu Sayeed (film director)
- Produced by: Impress Telefilm Limited
- Starring: Tarin Rahman; Azad Abul Kalam
- Cinematography: Abu Sayeed
- Music by: Abu Sayeed
- Release date: 2016
- Running time: 85 minutes
- Country: Bangladesh
- Language: Bengali

Dressing Table (Bengali: ড্রেসিং টেবিল) is a 2016 Bangladeshi drama film written and directed by Abu Sayeed. The film stars Tarin Rahman and Azad Abul Kalam in the lead roles.

== Plot ==
Shila and Rahul have been married recently. Being a lower-middle-class family, they could not get all the things needed to furnish a house. There is no dressing table in the house. One day Rahul brings home a dressing table, albeit an old one. Shila is still happy to have it. The next day, while cleaning the dressing table, she finds an old diary. Shila initially hesitates to read the diary as it belongs to someone else, but one night she gives in to her curiosity. After finding the first 2/3 pages interesting, she ends up reading the whole diary by the end of the night. After finishing the diary, Shila walks towards the dressing table. She looks at the mirror and discovers herself. Then starts a new chapter in her life.

== Cast ==
- Tarin Rahman as Shila
- Azad Abul Kalam as Rahul
- Taskin Sumi
- Arman Parvez Murad
- Nadia Nodi
- Iffat Trisha
- Tania Rahman
- Ataur Rahman
- KS Firoz
- Khalilur Rahman Qaderi

== Production and release ==
Filming began on 24 July 2015, took place in Dhaka and Purbali, and lasted 10 days. The film was submitted to the Bangladesh Film Censor Board on 4 August 2016, and cleared on 22 August.

Dressing Table received its world première at the 40th Montreal World Film Festival on 26 August 2016.

== Response ==
Film critic Swapan Mullick of The Statesman wrote, "The simplicity is quite deceptive and the acting far removed from the dramatic compulsions of popular cinema."
