= Pincers on Japan =

- Screenshot of opening title
- Directed by: James Beveridge
- Narrated by: Lorne Greene
- Cinematography: Julian Roffman; Leon C. Shelly; James Beveridge
- Production company: National Film Board of Canada
- Distributed by: Columbia Pictures of Canada
- Release date: 1943
- Running time: 19 minutes
- Country: Canada
- Language: English

Pincers on Japan (Piège à Nippon) is a 19-minute 1943 Canadian documentary film, made by the National Film Board of Canada (NFB). The film was directed by James Beveridge, who also produced and directed a similar NFB documentary, Look to the North (1944). Its companion film, Road to Tokyo, was produced in 1942.

== Synopsis ==
In 1943, Alaska and the north Pacific have become a theatre of war as Japanese forces threaten. For over a decade, Japan had begun training for warfare in a subarctic region, and had targeted the Aleutian Islands where they had maintained a foothold. Both Canadian and American forces are assembled to protect and defend the region, in what came to be known as the Aleutian Islands Campaign.

In 1942, U.S. Army engineers created the Alaska Highway, carved out of the northern bush to bring American troops and supplies northward. Canada's role is to construct airfields alongside the military highway and train troops to fight in the extreme conditions of the region. Out of Canadian ports on the west coast, ship convoys carrying war materiél supply the various outposts of the northwest, while patrol bombers and lookouts keep a constant vigil.

The Japanese invasion of the Aleutian Islands is countered by both a ground and air attack by Allied forces. With the defeat of the Japanese on American territory, Allied strategy moves from defence to taking the fight to the Japanese empire across the Pacific, striking at the heart of Japan.

== Production ==
Typical of the NFB's documentary short films, Pincers on Japan was created as a morale boosting "polemic" or propaganda film during the Second World War. The film relied heavily on newsreel material including "enemy" footage, and combined multiple sources to create a story. (Note: Enemy footage was provided care of the Alien Property Custodian.) Some of the footage for Pincers on Japan and Road to Tokyo was shot in British Columbia, by Leon C. Shelly.

The deep baritone voice of stage actor Lorne Greene was featured in the narration of Pincers on Japan. Greene, known for his work on both radio broadcasts as a news announcer at CBC as well as narrating many of the Canada Carries On series. His sonorous recitation led to his nickname, "The Voice of Canada", and to some observers, the "voice-of-God". When reading grim battle statistics or narrating a particularly serious topic such as the war on Japan, he was "The Voice of Doom".

== Reception ==
Pincers on Japan was produced in 35 mm for the theatrical market and was shown over a six-month period as part of the shorts or newsreel segments in approximately 800 theatres across Canada and later, the United States. The NFB had an arrangement with Famous Players theatres to ensure that Canadians from coast-to-coast could see them, with further distribution by Columbia Pictures.

After the six-month theatrical tour ended, individual films were made available on 16 mm to schools, libraries, churches and factories, extending the life of these films for another year or two. They were also made available to film libraries operated by university and provincial authorities.
