= Mehbooba Mahnoor Chandni =

Bangladeshi model, actress and dancer

- মেহবুবা মাহনূর চাঁদনী
- Born: 19 January 1983 (age 43)
- Occupations: Model, actress, dancer, dance teacher
- Years active: 1994-present
- Spouse: Bappa Mazumder (m. 2008; div. 2017)
- Awards: Bangladesh National Film Awards

Mehbooba Mahnoor Chandni (born 19 January 1983) is a Bangladeshi model, actress and dancer. She had roles in the films Dukhai, Lalsalu and Joyjatra.

== Biography ==
Chandni started taking dance lessons from the age of four. She learned Bharatanatyam, modern and Bangladeshi dance under Hero. She became first in group dancing in Notun Kuri competition telecasted on BTV.

Chandni started her career through the film Dukhai in 1994. She also appeared in television plays. She has earned a good name as a dancer and widely travels abroad. She performed in the cultural program as Bangladeshi community in Brunei Darussalam celebrated their 42nd Independence and National day in 2012.

Chandni married musician Bappa Mazumder on 21 March 2008. They were divorced in 2017.

== Works ==
=== Films ===
Year	Film	Director	Role	Co-stars	Notes
1994	Dukhai	Morshedul Islam		Raisul Islam Asad, Rokeya Prachy	
2001	Lalsalu	Tanvir Mokammel	Jamila	Raisul Islam Asad, Munira Yusuf Memy	won National Film Awards in Best supporting actress category
2004	Joyjatra	Tauquir Ahmed	Moriyom	Mahfuz Ahmed, Bipasha Hayat, Azizul Hakim	won National Film Awards in Best supporting actress category
2015	Bish	Kishor Mahmud		Sabbir, AK Azad Setu	as a gypsy girl

=== Dramas ===
Year	Film	Director Playwright	Co-stars	Notes
	Boyosh Jokhon Ekush	Taher Shipon	Shajal Noor	drama serial
2010	Haruner Mongol Houk		Shajal Noor	
2014	Dahan	Aranya Anwar		
2015	Bala	Nuzhat Alvi Ahmed; Kamona Seema	Shajal Noor	single-episode play being made for Mother's Day
2015	Green Card	Nuzhat Alvi Ahmed; Jakir Hosain Uzzal	Shajal Noor	seven episode drama aired on Asian TV

== Awards ==
Year	Award Title	Category	Film	Result
	Notun Kuri	Group Dance		First
2001	National Film Awards	Best Supporting Actress	Lalsalu	Won
2004	National Film Awards	Best Supporting Actress	Joyjatra	Won
