= Film society =

Film-watching club

A film society is a membership-based club where people can watch screenings of films that would otherwise not be shown in mainstream cinemas. In Spain, Ireland and Italy, they are known as "cineclubs", and in Germany they are known as "filmclubs". They usually have an educational aim, introducing new audiences to different audiovisual works through an organized and prepared program of screenings.

Editorial output reinforces the work of these organisations, as they produce hand-programmes, brochures, schedules, information sheets, and even essays, supporting the significance of their exhibitions. A common feature that may characterize a film society screening is that they begin with an introduction of the film to the audience, and end with the promotion of a discussion about the film, where assistants, organizers and sometimes the filmmakers themselves, exchange their views.

There are networks in many different countries, and these are organized into federations, councils, collectives, and local networks. Famous film societies include Amos Vogel's Cinema 16, Cinémathèque Française, and the Film Society of Lincoln Center in New York City.

== International ==
The film society movement originated in France in the time between the two world wars (see below). The international body for film societies is the International Federation of Film Societies (IFFS). This international association was set up in 1947 in Cannes (France) among groups of film societies in countries throughout the world and this association is called Fédération Internationale des Ciné-Clubs (F.I.C.C.).

== Australia ==
Founded in 1946, the Hobart Film Society is the oldest continually operating film society in Australia. The Melbourne Cinematheque began as the Melbourne University Film Society (MUFS) in 1948 and changed its name to Cinémathèque in 1984. The national body for film societies in Australia is the Australian Council of Film Societies (ACOFS) was established in 1949.

Notable members of the Australian "film society movement" include Ian Klava, David Stratton, Michael Thornhill, Frank Moorhouse, Ken Quinnell and John Flaus.

== Bangladesh ==
Film society movement in Bangladesh was started in 1963. The young generation of the '70s is continuing this society culture. From their effort, there are now quite a few film societies in Bangladesh. The parent organization is Federation of Film Societies of Bangladesh (FFSB). Prominent film societies in Bangladesh are:

- Moviyana Film Society
- Dhaka University Film Society
- Gono Bishwabidyalay Film Society
- Chokh Film Society
- Jagannath University Film Society
- Women's Film Society Bangladesh
- Zahir Raihan Film Society
- Islamic University Film Society
- Ranesh Dasgupta Film Society
- Children's Film Society, Bangladesh
- Rainbow Film Society
- Chalachchitram Film Society
- Sylhet Agricultural University Film Society
- Chittagong University Film Society
- Rajshahi University Film Society
- BUET Film Society
- CUET Film Society
- Brac University Film Society
- KHULNA FILM SOCIETY
- Barisal University Film society
- Daffodil International University Film Society

== Canada ==
The beginnings of Canadian film education may be traced to the relatively late arrival of the film society movement. While the earliest film societies were formed in Paris in 1924 and in London the following year, it was not until 1935 that Donald Buchanan assembled a sufficient number of film enthusiasts to launch the National Film Society of Canada. That organization, largely modelled on the British Film Institute, took as its mandate the establishment of a genuine film culture. Within a year, the society opened branches in Ottawa, Toronto, Montreal and Vancouver. The Vancouver Branch, founded in 1936, was particularly successful in the late 1930s; it presented its screenings in 35-millimetre prints at the commercial Stanley Theatre, and had more than 1,000 paid-up members. The Vancouver Branch was managed by O. C. Wilson (1936-39) and Oscar C. Burritt (1939-42).

After a wartime hiatus, the Canadian film society movement enjoyed what may now be seen as its golden age. The Vancouver Branch of the National Film Society, for instance, reformed in 1946–47 and collaborated with the Film Survey Group of the Labor Arts Guild to present an ambitious program of more than sixty classic films to enthusiastic audiences. In 1950 it was renamed the Vancouver Film Society.

In 1947, newly arrived from Vancouver, Dorothy and Oscar Burritt helped to found the Toronto Film Study Group, which in 1950 became the Toronto Film Society.

The National Film Society, renamed the Canadian Film Institute in 1950, became a clearing house for a growing number of societies across Canada. It was soon a victim of its own success as the groups broke away in 1954 to form the Canadian Federation of Film Societies (CFSS). Spearheaded by Dorothy Burritt, CFFS member societies programmed ambitious retrospectives often accompanied by lengthy and erudite program notes.

== Colombia ==
There are a number of active local societies including Pulpmovies and Cinema Solaz.

== France ==
The term "film club" appears for the first time in April 1907 with the creation of Edmond Benoit-Lévy's "Film club." Located at the 5 Montmartre boulevard in Paris, it is to preserve and place at the disposal of its members all the cinematographic documents and productions existing. It is also equipped with a room of projection.

The Italian film theoretician Ricciotto Canudo who had been living in Paris since 1921 founded one of the first film societies.

After the first world war the film director and film critic Louis Delluc founded one of the first film societies and the important film magazine Cinéa.

In 1930 Jean Vigo founded the first film club in Nice, les Amis du Cinéma. In 1935 Henri Langlois and Georges Franju founded the film society Cercle du cinéma which became the Cinémathèque française in 1936 to show and to preserve old films.

After the second world war the movement of ciné-clubs boomed. In 1945 the film society of Annecy was founded from which originated the Annecy International Animated Film Festival. In 1948 André Bazin together with Jean-Charles Tacchella, Doniol-Valcroze, Astruc, Claude Mauriac, René Clément and Pierre Kast founded the avantgarde film society Objectif 49. Jean Cocteau became its president. This film society became the cradle of the Nouvelle Vague. Objectif 49 organized the Festival du Film Maudit which took place in Biarritz in 1949.

François Truffaut has depicted vividly Bazin's engagement in the ciné=club-movement:

"During the first days of our friendship - it was about 1947 - I had the chance of accompanying him at his film presentations and observing him who he projected two short films of Chaplin - first in a Dominican monastery and two days later to the workers in a metal factory in their short break between their lunch and their return to their workbenches. At both occasions he managed to inspire his audience and to draw everybody into the discussion."

The first French film society exclusively for women was founded in the 1970s in Toulouse.

In 2005 the Musée Dapper in Paris founded the first film society entirely concentrating on the cinema of Africa, the Caribbean and the African-American diaspora - the occasion being the celebration of 50 years of African Cinema.

There is a federation of clubs: the Fédération Française des Ciné-Clubs.

== Germany ==
The first film clubs developed in Germany after 1945 upon the suggestion the British and French after the Second World War, in order to promote non-political strictly cultural exchange and democratic consciousness. In the 1950s, the decade of the flowering of the film club movement, gave it a wave of reestablishments, also in the Soviet occupation zone and/or later German Democratic Republic. The film clubs became either independent associations or worked under a carrier, which itself education and culture had used up. From them important impulses for the German film landscape proceeded, for example the establishment of film festivals as from International Filmfestival Mannheim-Heidelberg.
In the German Federal Republic however the number of the film clubs decreased to such an extent that in 1971 the Federal association dissolved. For the 1970s stepped in many places local cinemas to the place of the film clubs. With the collapse of the German Democratic Republic, many East German film clubs lost the financial and organizational basis, succeeded also here unite the step to the local cinema.
There are two national bodies for film societies in Germany who are members of the International Federation of Film Societies, the Bundesverband Jugend und Film e.V., and the Bundesverband kommunale Filmarbeit.

== Hungary ==
In Hungary, there is quite a vivid cine-club life with involving hundreds of viewers and dispute partners week by week... The first Hungarian film club is dated back to 1956, as you can read here:

== India ==
Filmmaker Satyajit Ray founded the first Indian film society, the Calcutta Film Society in 1947. In 1959, Federation of Film Societies of India was formed as a central organization combining the film societies of Calcutta, Delhi, Bombay (now Mumbai), Madras (now Chennai) and Patna. Satyajit Ray was elected president. In Chennai, in 1981 Chennai Film Society was started by serious film buffs and film institute graduates. M. Sivakumar was its founder secretary and Sasikumar was its founder president. It was active for 15 years with screening of international films, conducting film appreciation courses, meeting up with film makers, screening retrospective of masters and anniversary film festival. It ran a film magazine in Tamil called Salanam for five years. With the advent of DVDs, satellite television channels, and many of its society organizers got active in film making, the Chennai film society slowly disappeared.

The first film society in Kerala was formed in Trivandrum in 1965. It was formed by the celebrated and award-winning director Adoor Gopalakrishnan. It paved the way for a new Malayalam cinema. https://web.archive.org/web/20130131092225/http://www.cinemaofmalayalam.net/malayalam_his_4.html

Indo Cine Appreciation Foundation in Chennai has been conducting an annual international film festival, Chennai International Film Festival (CIFF) every year in December- http://www.chennaifilmfest.com, http://www.icaf.in, an annual event since 2003.

According to film scholar Amrit Gangar it is necessary for a member to be at least 18 years old as film societies are allowed to show uncensored films being exempt from censorship laws. yadharthaa is a Film society functioning from 04-12-1978 in Madurai Tamil Nadu. Tamil Nadu Children Film Society organising Madurai International Children Film Festival from 2004.

== Ireland ==
The Irish Film Theatre operated as a film club in Dublin from 1977 to 1984. It offered audiences art and international films not usually shown by commercial cinemas, and the venue was unusual in showing uncensored films. Irish censorship law only required films that were shown to the general public to be submitted for censorship, and films screened by clubs were exempt from censor review, and cutting or banning.

== New Zealand ==
The first New Zealand Film Society was set up in 1945. In 2015 the New Zealand Federation of Film Societies represented fourteen regions.

The Wellington Film Society is the largest film society in New Zealand. It screens weekly at the Embassy theatre and in 2024 had an average weekly attendance of 537.

== Norway ==
Norwegian film societies are called filmclubs, and their national body is The Norwegian Federation of Film Societies. The first filmclubs were founded at the end of the 1950s in Oslo and Narvik, and since then the film society movement has thrived both in the big cities, and in more rural areas of Norway.

== Poland ==
The national body for film societies in Poland is the Polish Federation of Film Societies (Polska Federacja Dyskusyjnych Klubów Filmowych - PF DKF). Its honorary chairman is Andrzej Wajda.

== Portugal ==
The national body for film societies for this country is Portuguese Federation of Film Societies, founded in 1978. www.fpcc.pt

== Spain ==
There are two federations of film societies in Spain representing Catalonia and Galicia, the Catalan Federation of Film Societies (Federació Catalana de Cine Clubs) and the Federation of Film Societies of Galicia (Federación de Cineclubes de Galicia).

== United Kingdom ==
The first film society was established in London in 1925 by a group of intellectuals and enthusiasts including Iris Barry, Sidney Bernstein, Baron Bernstein, Adrian Brunel, Hugh Miller, Walter Mycroft, and Ivor Montagu, to show films which had been rejected on commercial grounds, most of them European, and films which had been rejected by the censor, most of them from the Soviet Union. It counted among its sponsors George Bernard Shaw, H. G. Wells, and numerous members of the Bloomsbury Group. It was simply called the Film Society, but is often referred to as the London Film Society as it was followed by many others in the next fifteen years. These included the Edinburgh Film Guild (1929, still in existence) and the Salford Workers Film Society (1930; this became the Manchester & Salford Film Society, still in existence). Its activities came to an end in 1939, though after the war the New London Film Society was something of a successor body.

The national body for film societies in the UK is the British Federation of Film Societies (BFFS). Most university and college students' unions have film societies, including the Warwick Student Cinema at University of Warwick, the Oxford University Filmmaking Foundation at University of Oxford, and one of the country's oldest at University College London. In 2006, Filmclub was launched by Beeban Kidron and journalist Lindsay Mackie to improve schoolchildren's access to film.

== United States ==
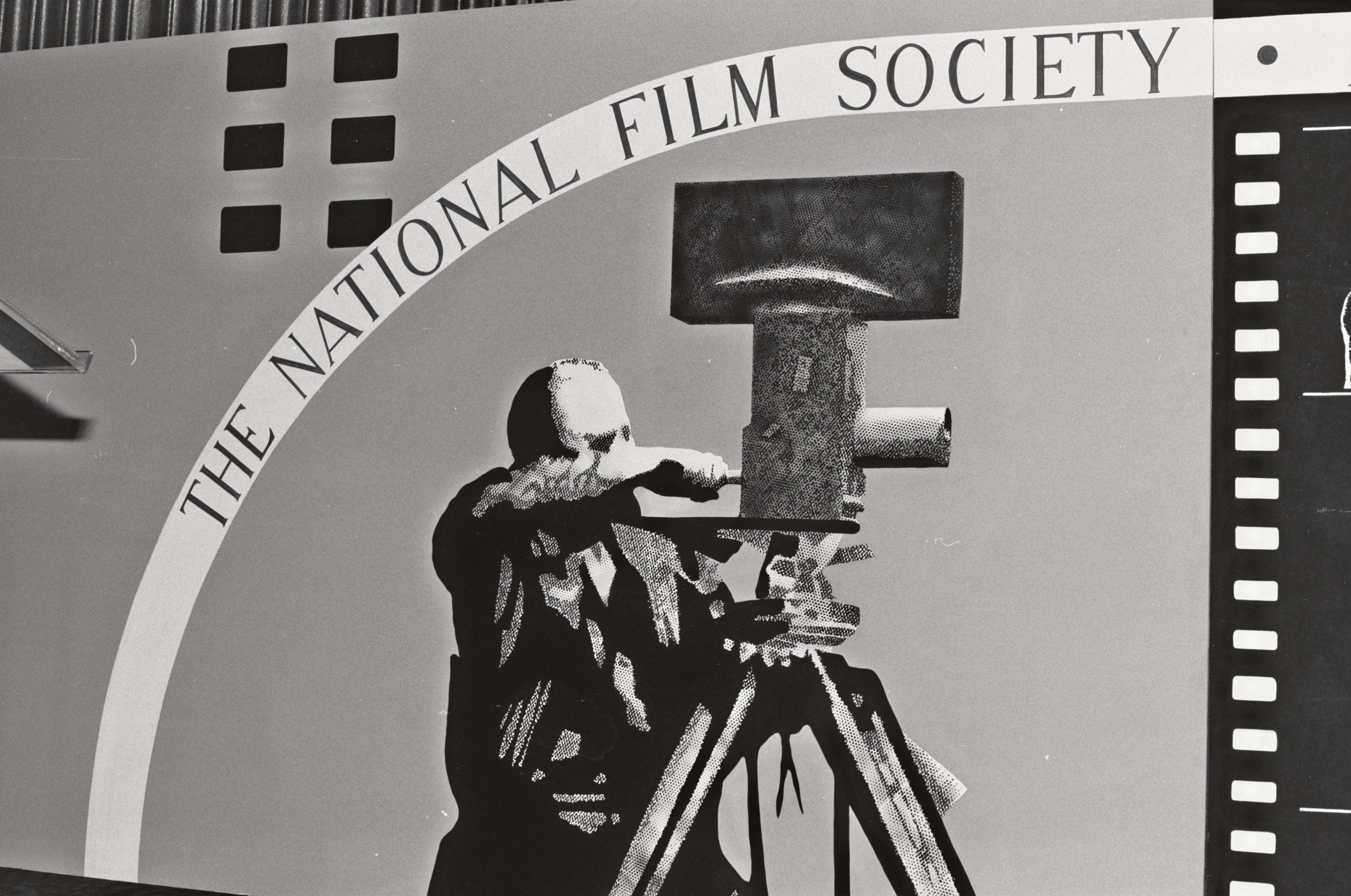
A National Film Society poster

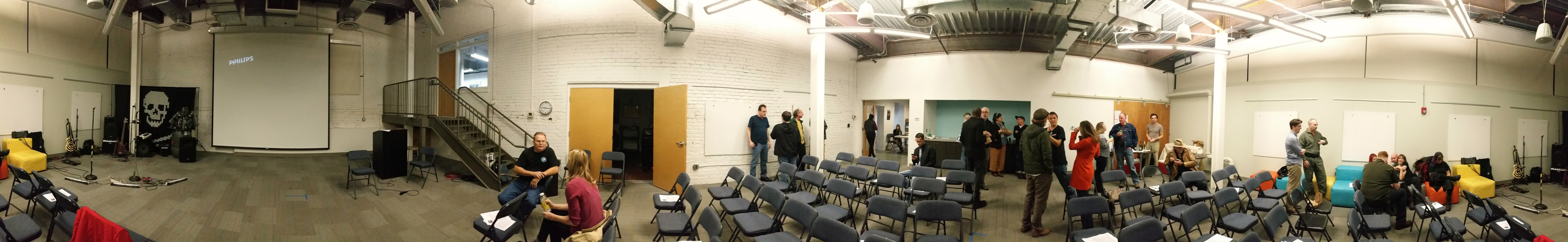
The James River Film Society

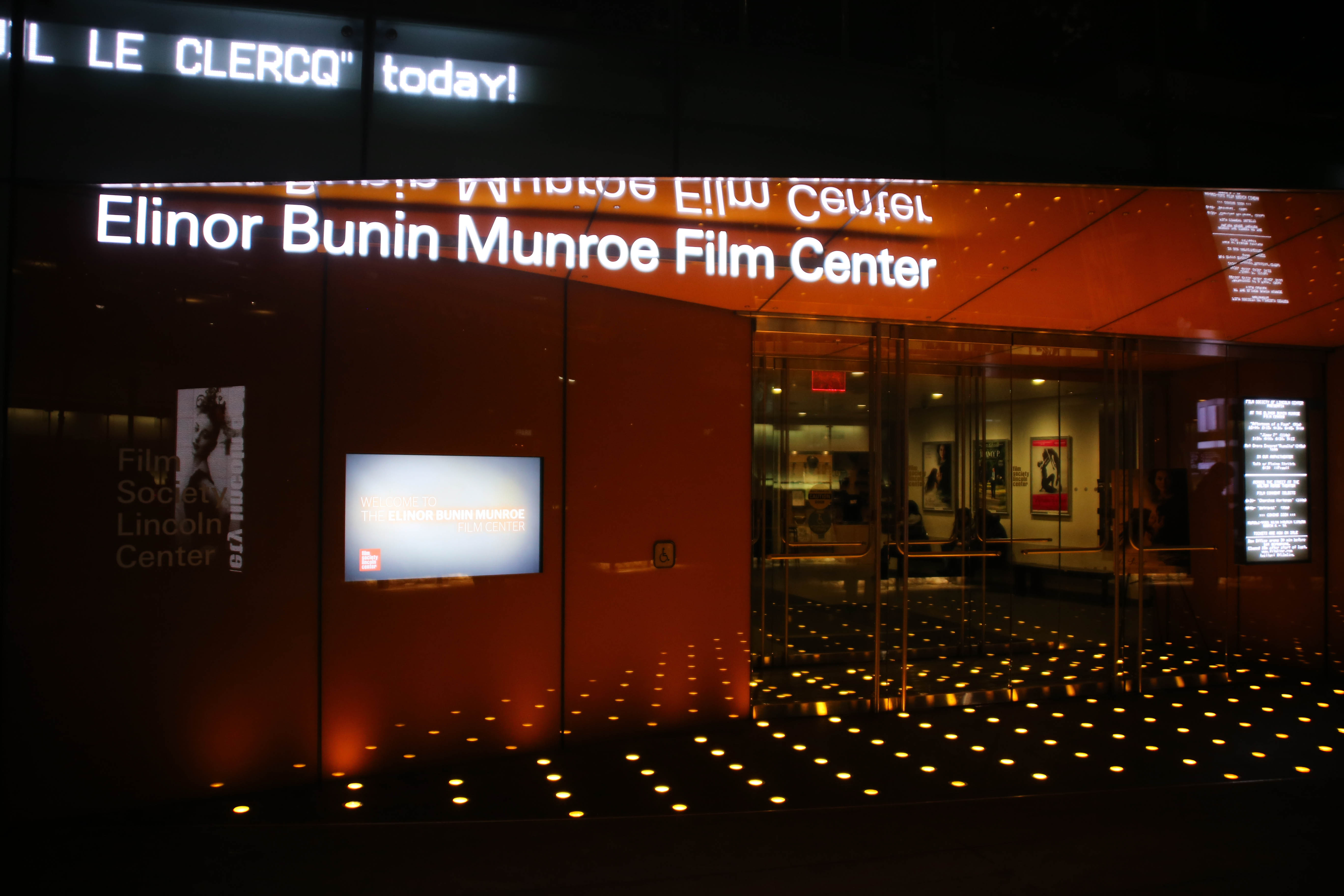
The Elinor Bunin Munroe Film Center; Film Society of Lincoln Center

"From 1946 until 1954, 'Art in Cinema' presented programs of independent film to large audiences at the San Francisco Museum of Art and at the University of California, Berkeley." Inspired by film projections which Maya Deren had organized, Amos Vogel and his wife founded Cinema 16 in 1947.

Other film societies in the United States include:

- Armenian Film Society in Glendale, California
- Austin Film Society
- CWRU Film Society in Cleveland, Ohio
- Central Coast Film Society in California
- Columbia Film Society in Columbia, Maryland
- Columbia Film Society in Columbia, South Carolina
- Desert Film Society based in Palm Springs, California
- Enzian Film Society in Maitland, Florida
- Film Society of Lincoln Center based in New York City
- Houston Cinema Arts Society in Houston, Texas
- North Country Film Society, which represents upstate New York
- Park Circle Film Society in North Charleston, South Carolina
- Peoria Riverfront Museum Film Society, Peoria, Illinois, Marc Eliot, Resident Curator
- Rehoboth Beach Film Society in Delaware
- Tallahassee Film Society
- Victoria Film Society in Victoria, Texas
- Doc Films in Chicago, Illinois

== Venezuela ==
Cine Club Monteávila
