= Uttarer Khep =

- Poster
- Directed by: Shahjahan Chowdhury
- Based on: Uttarer Khep by Shawkat Ali
- Starring: Champa; Manna; Anwara
- Music by: Sheikh Sadi Khan
- Release date: 2000
- Country: Bangladesh
- Language: Bengali-language

Uttarer Khep is a 2000 Bangladeshi drama film directed by Shahjahan Chowdhury and starring Champa and Manna in lead roles. Champa earned a Bangladesh National Film Award for Best Actress for her role. The film is based on a novel by the same name by Shawkat Ali.

== Cast ==
- Champa
- Manna
- Chitralekha Guho
- Pijush Bandyopadhyay
- Tushar Khan

== Music ==
#	Song-title	Singer	Picturised on
1	"Ami Boro Eka"	Agun	Manna
