= KS Firoz =

Bangladeshi actor (1946–2020)

- কে এস ফিরোজ

Personal details
- Born: Khandaker Shaheed Uddin Firoz; 7 July 1946 Wazirpur, Barisal, Bengal Presidency, British India
- Died: 9 September 2020 (aged 74) Dhaka, Bangladesh
- Spouse: Madhobi Firoz (m. 1974)
- Children: 3
- Occupation: Actor

Military service
- Allegiance: Bangladesh
- Branch/service: Bangladesh Army
- Years of service: 1967–1977
- Rank: Major

Khandaker Shaheed Uddin Firoz (known as KS Firoz; 7 July 1946 – 9 September 2020) was a Bangladeshi actor.

== Early life and career ==
Firoz was born in Wazirpur, Barisal in the then Bengal Presidency, British India. He was brought up in Dhaka's Lalbagh area.

Firoz joined the Bangladesh Army in 1967, and reached the rank of Major before retiring in 1977. He was active in the Dhaka theatre circuit, and got his breakthrough in King Lear. He made his career debut in the television drama Dwip Tobuo Jwoley and in films in Lawarish.

== Personal life and death ==
Firoz married Madhobi in 1974, and had three daughters. He died from COVID-19 complications during the COVID-19 pandemic in Bangladesh on 9 September 2020, at the age of 74.

== Works ==
Films

- Padma Nadir Majhi
- Nodir Naam Modhumoti
- Shankhonad
- Brihonnola
- Chandragrohon
- Tumi Amar (1994)
- Devdas

Drama

- Ayomoy
- Banshi
- Dressing Table (2016)
