= Australian Council of Film Societies =

National film society

Australian Council of Film Societies ACOFS is the national body for film societies in Australia. The inaugural meeting was held in Sydney in November 1949 and the constitution was adopted at a second meeting which is the official start of ACOFS, in 1950. Only two Federations existed at this time, from Victoria and NSW, but individual societies were represented from Queensland, ACT and Tasmania. The early issues which motivated ACOFS members were censorship, UNESCO ideals, sales tax on 16mm films and acquisition of suitable titles. ACOFS has seen many fluctuations in its membership and activities since then and in 2005 celebrated fifty four years of operation. There has been a lively and active film society culture in Australia for over sixty years.

== Film Societies in Australia ==
The membership of Australia's film societies varies between 15 and over 1000. In country areas probably 20 to 30 is the norm. Many films have only been seen in Australia by members of the general public when programmed by a film society. Most of the films screened by film societies in Australia are selected from the more than 6,000 titles held in the Non-Theatrical Lending Collection, owned and managed by the National Film and Sound Archive. This is a world-renowned collection of 16 mm feature films and short films and more recently DVDs which are available to film societies for a service charge. There is another lending facility within the Archive of mainly Australian films which on different terms are also available for screening. Protecting these invaluable resources has been one of ACOFS' main activities over the past few years.

=== Notable Presidents ===
The inaugural meeting of ACOFS was chaired by John Heyer the notable documentary film maker. The first President in 1950 was Professor AK Stout and during the first decade such notable figures as Frank Nicholls (Vic), WH (Bill) Perkins (Tas), Erwin Rado (Vic) David Donaldson (NSW) and Ray Fisher (Vic) all had spells in the Presidential seat.

Barrie King was instrumental in reviving ACOFS in 1974 after several years of inactivity, and alternated between President and Secretary as the needs arose for the next twenty five years. A leading figure in the International Film Theatre in Perth, the Western Australian Federation of Film Societies and the State Archive of Western Australia, Barrie was totally involved in the film culture until an untimely stroke compelled him to relinquish all positions in 1999. Barrie had been a campaigner for foundation of the National Film and Sound Archive and was a member of its first Advisory Committee from 1984.

John Turner became Treasurer of ACOFS in 1974 and remained in that position for 25 years, taking over from Barrie King as President in 1999 until the present (2008). John produced all seven editions of the ACOFS 16mm Catalogue (two were in conjunction with the National Library of Australia) and the first Catalogue of the NLA Film Study Collection (with Andrew Pike). John has been a strong campaigner for the Film Study Collection over many years.

== Members ==
There are six state federations covering the six states, Australian Capital Territory and Northern Territory, and approximately two hundred film societies as members of these federations.

- Federation of Victorian Film Societies
- New South Wales Federation of Film Societies
- West Australian Federation of Film Societies
- South Australian Federation of Film Societies
- Tasmanian Federation of Film Societies
- Federation of Queensland Film Societies
- Screen & Study Institute (SASI) (Associate Member)

== Annual General Meetings ==
The state federations operate independently, and delegates from each state Federation meet once a year at the ACOFS Conference and AGM to set policy for the coming year.

In the past the Conference/AGM tended to be held in rotation around the State capital cities usually lasting for two days. With COVID restrictions, meetings have been held using internet tools.

At the 2022 AGM, the newly elected executive committee was:

President: Prodos S N Marinakis (QLD/VIC)

Vice President: Mark Horner (TAS)

Secretary: Jason Lockwood (NSW)

Treasurer: Kerry McKinnon (QLD)

== Services ==
ACOFS itself provides publicity, education and information, but its main role is to keep the film society movement to the forefront when government policy and self-interest pushes the many non-commercial, fragmented Australian film bodies to the fore. The state federations on the other hand have a more hands on approach, and provide insurance policies, preview feature and short films, provide film and DVD technical advice, run film weekends and generally help the smaller societies to stay afloat year after year.

ACOFS can provide a state-by-state listing of film societies around Australia. Existing groups or individuals interested in starting a film society can request information and advice from the State Federations of Film Societies or ACOFS (the parent body). They provide information, advice and services that are not available to the individual.

Among the benefits available through ACOFS and the Federations are:

- A film insurance scheme to protect against loss or damage of film
- Film distribution arrangements to reduce the cost of film hire and freight
- A DVD screening rights agreement with the major DVD distributors in Australia to cover the screening rights for DVDs screened by member film societies.

Publications

ACOFS publishes a number of Fact Sheets and other documentation

These are as of April 2018

Fact Sheet #1 – 16mm films from ACMI

Fact Sheet #2 – Borrowing from the NFSA

Fact Sheet #3a – How to Obtain your DVDs & Get Screening Rights

Fact Sheet #3b – DVD Distributor Contacts

Fact Sheet #3c – DVD Agreements – Info for Distributors

Fact Sheet #4 – How to Start a Film Society Federation

Fact Sheet #5 – Public Liability Insurance

Projectionist's Reference Manual

The Film Society Handbook

ACOFS is a member of the International Federation of Film Societies.
