= Australian Football Council =

Australian Football Council may refer to:

- Australian Amateur Football Council, the governing body for the sport of amateur Australian rules football in the states of Victoria, South Australia and Tasmania in Australia formed in 1933
- Australian National Football Council a national body for the sport of Australian rules football; known as the Australasian Football Council (1890–1927) and Australian National Football Council (1927–1993); though commonly referred to as the Australian Football Council before and after the name change
- International Australian Football Council, a body formed to govern Australian rules football internationally which existed between 1995 and 2002
