= Australian Legislative Council =

Australian Legislative Council may refer to:

- South Australian Legislative Council, the upper house of the Parliament of South Australia
- Western Australian Legislative Council, the upper house of parliament in the Australian state of Western Australia
- New South Wales Legislative Council, the upper house of parliament in the Australian state of New South Wales
- Tasmanian Legislative Council, the upper house of parliament in the Australian state of Tasmania
- Queensland Legislative Council, the former upper house of parliament in the Australian state of Queensland, abolished 1922
- Victorian Legislative Council, the upper house of parliament in the Australian state of Victoria
