= Abu Sayeed (film director) =

Bangladeshi film director, screenwriter, and television producer

- আবু সাইয়ীদ
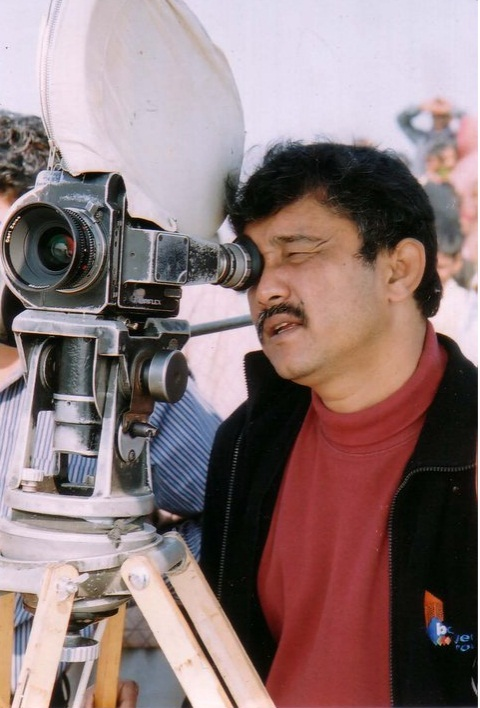
- Born: 1961 or 1962 (age 63–64)
- Occupations: Film director, screenwriter, television producer
- Years active: 1987–present
- Notable work: Kittonkhola, Shangkhonad, Nirontor, Rupantor, Opekkha, Ekjon Kabir mrityu
- Children: Anindo Sayeed

Abu Sayeed (born 1962) is a Bangladeshi film director, screenwriter, and television producer. As a filmmaker he has made six full-length features and two short films. HIs films have received 6 national and 4 international awards.

== Biography ==
Sayeed graduated from United High School, Naogan, and then attended Government Azizul Haque College.

In 1987, at the age of 25, Abu Sayeed made his first film, the short Aborton. It was released the following year and won the Bangladesh National Film Award for Best Short Film. Sayeed started work on his second short film, Dhushar Jatra, in 1989. It was released in 1992, and also won the National Award for Best Short Film.

The short films were not lucrative, however, so in 1997 Sayeed shifted to television production, which was more profitable.

=== 2000-present ===
In 2000, Sayeed directed his first feature film, Kittonkhola. It won National Awards for Best Film, Best Director, and in seven other categories. His second feature, Shankhonad, won the Meril-Prothom Alo Critics Choice Award for Best Film. His third feature, Nirontor (English title Forever Flows) was Bangladesh's submission to the 79th Academy Awards for the Academy Award for Best Foreign Language Film, but was not accepted as a nominee.

He and his wife have a son, born in 2006.

=== Urban planning ===
Sayeed has championed an elevated "Moving Road" concept similar to a moving walkway as a solution to traffic congestion in Dhaka. In late 2017, he demonstrated a prototype at the Shilpakala Academy. In March 2020, he exhibited the idea at Sufia Kamal National Public Library. He has also advocated elevated housing that emulates the structure of trees, calling it a more environmentally friendly architectural design.

== Filmography ==
Year	Film	Ref.
2000	Kittonkhola	
2004	Shankhonad	
2006	Nirontor	
2007	Banshi	
2008	Rupantor	
2010	Opekkha	
2016	Dressing Table	
2017	Death of a Poet	
