= Debashis Sarkar =

Indian author, columnist and management consultant

- Occupations: Author, management consultant
- Years active: 1998–present
- Known for: Lean management, Operational excellence, The DEB-LOREX model
- Notable work: Building a Lean Service Enterprise – Reflections of a Lean Management Practitioner (2016); How Can I Help You – 5 Mistakes to Avoid in Customer Service (2013); Lessons in Lean Management (2012); Lean for Service Organizations and Offices–Holistic Approach for Achieving Operational Excellence (2008); 5S for Service Organizations and Offices–A Lean Look at Improvement (2006); Lessons in Six Sigma (2004)
- Awards: QCI's D.L. Shah Quality Champion Platinum Award (2017); ASQ's Philip Crosby Medal (2014); American Society for Quality Fellow (2013)
- Website: Official website

Debashis Sarkar is an Indian author, columnist and management consultant. He is the author of 11 books, including Building a Lean Service Enterprise – Reflections of a Lean Management Practitioner (2016), How Can I Help You – 5 Mistakes to Avoid in Customer Service (2013), Lessons in Lean Management (2012), Lean for Service Organizations and Offices–Holistic Approach for Achieving Operational Excellence (2008), 5S for Service Organizations and Offices–A Lean Look at Improvement (2006) and Lessons in Six Sigma (2004). He is noted for his work in Lean management and Operational excellence. Sarkar is an American Society for Quality (ASQ) Fellow. In recognition of his book, Lessons in Lean Management (2012), he was awarded the ASQ Crosby Medal in 2014. For his contribution to the field of quality, he also received the first D.L. Shah Quality Champion Platinum Award from Quality Council of India for the year 2017–2018. He has been credited for conceptualizing the DEB-LOREX Model.

== Work ==
Debashis Sarkar is the author of several books, some of which include Building a Lean Service Enterprise – Reflections of a Lean Management Practitioner (2016), How Can I Help You – 5 Mistakes to Avoid in Customer Service (2013), Lessons in Lean Management (2012), Lean for Service Organizations and Offices–Holistic Approach for Achieving Operational Excellence (2008), 5S for Service Organizations and Offices–A Lean Look at Improvement (2006) and Lessons in Six Sigma (2004) and Quality in Business (2003). He has conceptualized the DEB-LOREX Model, a holistic approach for service lean transformation.

A book review, published in Mint described him as "an authority on Lean management". He served as the global head of reengineering at Standard Chartered, head of organizational excellence group at ICICI Bank and also held various leadership positions in Unilever, Marico and Coca-Cola. He also served as the chairman of the ASQ Automotive Division-Team India.

Sarkar's writings have appeared in The Financial Express, The Smart Manager, Performance Improvement Journal and Quality Digest. He is also a columnist at multiple publications, including Huffington Post and The Economic Times.

== Bibliography ==
=== Books ===
- Building a Lean Service Enterprise: Reflections of a Lean Management Practitioner. Productivity Press. 2016. ISBN 9781498779593.
- How Can I Help You?: 5 Mistakes to Avoid in Customer Service. Random House. 2013. ISBN 9788184004144.
- Lessons in Lean Management. Westland. 2012. ISBN 9789381626801.
- Lean for Service Organizations and Offices: A Holistic Approach for Achieving Operational Excellence and Improvements. ASQ Quality Press. 2007. ISBN 9780873897242.
- 5S for Service Organizations and Offices. Pearson Education. 2006. ISBN 9788131725511.
- The India Business Quiz Book. SAGE Publications. 2005. ISBN 9780761933441.
- Lessons in Six Sigma: 72 Must-Know Truths for Managers. SAGE Publications. 2004. ISBN 9780761998433.
- Quiz on Geography. Sura College of Competition. 2004. ISBN 9788174780706.
- Quality in Business: 76 Mantras for Managers. SAGE Publications. 2003. ISBN 9780761997948.
- The Millennium Business Quiz Book. Response Books. 2001. ISBN 9780761995159.
- Managers Handbook For Total Quality Management. Beacon Books. 1998. ISBN 9788186104491. OCLC 959383464.

== Awards and recognition ==
- He was awarded the first D.L. Shah Quality Champion Platinum Award from Quality Council of India for the year 2017–2018.
- He was listed in The Asian Banker's List of Leading Practitioners in 2015.
- In 2014, he received the Philip Crosby Medal from American Society for Quality for his book, Lessons in Lean Management (2012).
- Debashis was named Fellow of American Society for Quality (ASQ) in February 2013.
- He was listed in the Who's Who in Quality by Quality Progress, in 2009.
- He received the Golden Quill Award twice from ASQ Quality Press in 2008 and in 2007.
