= Rokeya Prachy =

Bangladeshi actress and director

- রোকেয়া প্রাচী
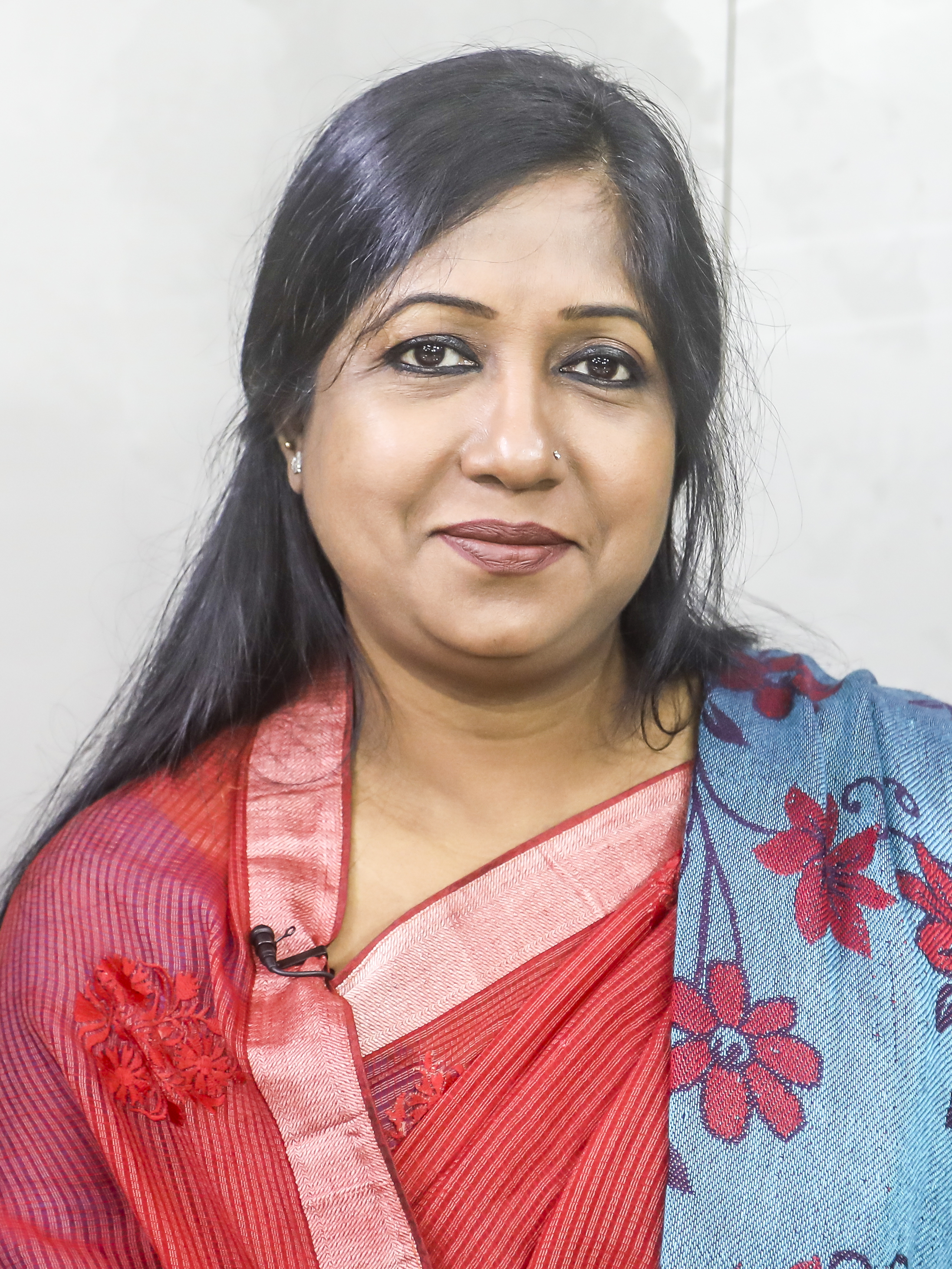
- Prachy in Dhaka, 2019
- Occupations: Actress; director
- Spouses: Ahad Parvez (died 1999); Asif Nazrul (m. 2004; div. 2013)
- Awards: Bangladesh National Film Awards

Rokeya Prachy is a Bangladeshi theater, television and film actress and director.

== Career ==
Prachy got her acting breakthrough in Morshedul Islam's film Dukhai in 1997. Her first directorial work was a docufiction for Channel I in 2009. She later directed "Lutfunnesa" and "Bayanno'r Michhile". In 2015, she made her first television series direction in "Shelai Poribar".

== Personal life ==
Prachy was married to Sergeant Ahad Parvez, who was later killed by muggers in Shapla Square, Motijheel in Dhaka on 28 October 1999. She then married journalist and columnist Asif Nazrul in May 2004. They later welcomed a daughter, but then divorced in 2013.

== Criticism ==
In 2024, during the Student–People's uprising, Rokeya Prachy expressed support for the government amidst allegations of repression and violence against the protesters by the Awami League administration. Reports suggest that a group of artists aligned with the Awami League party, including Prachy, were active in a WhatsApp group named "Alo Ashbei" (English: There'll be light), reportedly led by actor Ferdous Ahmed, to oppose the movement. Following the non-cooperation phase of the protests, on September 3, 2024, screenshots purportedly linked to discussions within this WhatsApp group surfaced on social media, where some members suggested to ‘throw hot water on protesters’, which drew attention and criticism online.

In April 2025, a murder case was filed against Prachy and 16 other actors over the death of a protester in Vatara during the Anti-Discrimination Student Movement against the Awami League government led by Prime Minister Sheikh Hasina.

== Works ==
=== Television dramas ===
- Share Bahattor Ghonta (2016)
- Shelai Poribar (2015)
- Parampara (2015)
- Tobuo Manush Swopno Dekhe (2015)

=== Films ===
Year	Title	Role	Notes
1997	Dukhai		
2002	Matir Moina	Ayesha Bibi	
2006	Ontarjatra		
2007	On the Wings of Dreams	Matka	
2010	Moner Manush	Lalon's mother	
	Andho Nirangam	Lalon's mother	
2013	Gaariwala		
2013	Shikhandi Kotha		
2017	Doob: No Bed of Roses	Maya	
2018	Matir Projar Deshe		
2022	Mujib: The Making of a Nation		
2025	Saba	Shirin	

== Awards and nominations ==
Prachy was nominated for and won domestic and international awards.

Year	Award	Category	Film	Result
1998	Bangladesh National Film Awards	Best Supporting Actress	Dukhai	Won
1999	Critics’ Award	Best Actress	Chor	Won
2008	Lux Channel-I Performance Award	Best Supporting Actress	On the Wings of Dreams	Won
