= Nazma Anwar =

Bangladeshi actress (c. 1941–2004)

- নাজমা আনোয়ার
- Born: c. 1941; Munshiganj District, Bengal Presidency, British India
- Died: 14 December 2004 (aged 62–63); Dhaka, Bangladesh
- Occupation: Actor
- Years active: 1981-2004
- Children: Ishrat Nishat (d. 2020) Manzur Kalam Nuzhat Anwar Nisbat Anwar Nusrat Naheed

Nazma Anwar (c. 1941 – 14 December 2004) was a Bangladeshi film and television actress, and drama activist. She performed in Bengali films including Hajar Bachhor Dhore (2005), Dukhai (1997) Joyjatra (2004), Shonkhonil Karagar (1992), Chittagong: The Last Stopover (2000), Shankhonad (2004) and also in television drama plays including Iblish, Kothao Keu Nei, and Tahara.

== Early life ==
Anwar was born in 1941 in Munshiganj District in the-then British India. Her father was a professor of Arabic in the Government Haraganga College. She moved to Dhaka with her family when she finished her sixth grade in school.

== Career ==
Anwar started her career as a theater activist by joining Dhaka Drama Circle in 1960s. In 1981, she joined in Aranyak Natyadal, a theater group in Bangladesh.

In 2001, she played in the tele drama Kariman Bewa (2001), based on the biography of freedom fighter Taramon Bibi.

== Personal life ==
Anwar had five children. Her daughter, Ishrat Nishat, was a theatre activist. Ishrat Nishat died on January 19, 2020 from a cardiac arrest at around 11:00 pm at 56 years old.

== Works ==
Films

- Shonkhonil Karagar (1992)
- Dukhai (1997)
- Chittagong: The Last Stopover (2000)
- Joyjatra (2004)
- Shankhonad (2004)
- Hajar Bachhor Dhore (2005)
