= Joyjatra =

- Bengali: জয়যাত্রা
- Directed by: Tauquir Ahmed
- Written by: Amjad Hossain
- Screenplay by: Tauquir Ahmed
- Produced by: Nokkhotro Films and Impress Telefilm Limited
- Starring: Mahfuz Ahmed; Bipasha Hayat; Azizul Hakim; Abul Hayat; Humayun Faridi; Tariq Anam Khan
- Cinematography: Rafiqul Bari Chowdhury
- Edited by: Arghyakamal Mitra
- Music by: Shujeo Shyam
- Distributed by: Nokkhotro Films
- Release date: 15 November 2004
- Running time: 119 minutes
- Country: Bangladesh
- Language: Bengali

Joyjatra ("Triumphant Journey"; Bengali: জয়যাত্রা) is a 2004 Bangladeshi film directed by Tauquir Ahmed and produced by Azam Faruk, featuring Mahfuz Ahmed, Bipasha Hayat, Azizul Hakim, Ahsan Habib Nasim, and others. The film is set in the period of the Bangladesh Liberation War.

== Plot ==
Joyjatra takes place during the liberation war of Bangladesh. Many people from various villages and ethnic backgrounds attempt to flee to India after the Pakistan Army launched an attack on them. For days, the refugees have been stuck on a boat on a journey to India, but eventually, some of them were killed by the army.

== Cast ==
- Mahfuz Ahmed as Baidhan
- Azizul Hakim as Adam
- Bipasha Hayat as Hawa
- Abul Hayat as Ramkrisna
- Humayun Faridi as Panchanand Saha
- Tariq Anam Khan as Tarafdar
- Chadni as Marium
- Intekhab Dinar as Johnson
- Rumana as Sokhina
- Shahed Sharif Khan as Kashem
- Shams Sumon as Jashimuddin
- Farhana Rahman as Jashimuddin's wife
- Shuvra as Fatema
- Ahsan Habib Nasim as Ali
- Nazma Anwar as Grandmother
- Saleh Ahmed as Imam
- Jayanta Chattopadhyay as Dr. Kalikingkor
- Mosharraf Karim (credited as Mosharraf Hossain) as Foni, who later converts to Islam and changes his name to Farid Ali.

== Soundtrack ==
The songs of this film were composed by Sujey Shyam and the lyrics by Mosharraf Hossain.

== Awards and nominations ==
This film won several awards including

Bangladesh National Film Awards

Category	Awardee	Result
Best Film	Tauquir Ahmed	Won
Best Director	Tauquir Ahmed	Won
Best Actress in Supporting Role	Mehbooba Mahnoor Chandni	Won
Best Music Director	Shujeo Shyam	Won
Best Story	Amjad Hossain	Won
Best screenplay	Tauquir Ahmed	Won
Best Cinematography	Rafiqul Bari Chowdhury	Won

Dhaka International Film Festival

- Won Special Award for the Film

Meril Prothom Alo Awards

- Won Critics Choice Best Director - Tauquir Ahmed

== See also ==
- Bangladesh National Film Awards
- Cinema of Bangladesh
