= Shahjahan Chowdhury (film director) =

Bangladeshi film director

- শাহজাহান চৌধুরী
- Occupation: Film director

Shahjahan Chowdhury is a Bangladeshi film director and scriptwriter. As of 2011, he has made five films – Pinjar (1975), Shatru (1985), Uttarer Khep (2004) and Ek Khanda Jami (2004) and Madhumati (2011).

== Career ==
Before 1971, Chowdhury worked for the newspaper Khobor. Chowdhury debuted in film making through Pinjar (1975). He was co-director with the Pakistani filmmaker Suroor Barabankvi for the film Akhri Station.

After the independence of Bangladesh in 1971, he began working with Weekly Bichitra. He later published the monthly, Nipun. He has been serving as the editor and publisher of the Weekly Nipun since 2009.

== Personal life ==
He married Sufia Chowdhury. Together they have 2 son Arman Chowdhury and Shaan Chowdhury. Currently, he resides in USA.
