= Leon C. Shelly =

Canadian film producer

- Born: May 10, 1906; Louth, St. Catharines, Ontario
- Died: April 23, 1987 (aged 80); Toronto
- Occupation: Film producer
- Years active: 1936-1969

Leon C. Shelly (1906–1987) was a Canadian producer of industrial and sponsored films, active in Vancouver (1936–1945) and in Toronto (1945–1969).

== Early life ==
Leonard Curtis Shelly was born in Louth, St. Catharines, Ontario in 1906, the eldest of six children of Cora Snure and W. C. Shelly, a prominent Vancouver businessman who would become a Member of the Legislative Assembly of British Columbia (1928–1933) and provincial finance minister. The elder Shelly was co-founder, with his brother Frederick, of Shelly Brothers Ltd., a successful commercial bakery with locations throughout British Columbia; that company would eventually become Canada Bread. William was also in the timber business, and president of several other companies including Home Oil Co. Ltd., Canada Grain Export Co. Ltd., Guaranty Savings and Loan, Nanaimo Sawmills, and Grouse Mountain Highway and Scenic Resort Ltd. Leon Shelly was involved in managing and developing the latter project and, when his father retired in 1940, Leon was listed as his corporate "advertising manager".

== Career ==
It was presumably in his capacity as the promoter of various companies in numerous fields that Leon saw film as a valuable marketing tool. And it was with an investment from his father that, in 1936, Leon Shelly assumed control of two Vancouver motion picture service companies. Motion Skreenadz Limited had been founded in 1920, and was initially operated by J. Howard Boothe and Harry Rosenbaum. Skreenadz specialized in the production of theatrical advertising trailers or "screen ads," but later expanded to make promotional shorts and travelogues for the local market. Vancouver Motion Pictures Limited, founded in 1928 by Rosenbaum, Roger Bourne, Charles McKenzie and Charles Lambly, initially provided film laboratory and technical services. Both companies had offices in the Film Exchange Building at 1216 Burrard Street in downtown Vancouver.

== Vancouver Motion Pictures ==
Under Shelly's leadership, Vancouver Motion Pictures (VMP) emerged in the 1930s and 1940s as an active and busy production house, creating dozens of sponsored promotional and industrial shorts. The company and its staff would play an important early part in the development of the Vancouver film industry. Notable clients included the BC Government Travel Bureau, BC Packers, Kelly Douglas Limited, and the Powell River Company.

With the help of cinematographer and technical wizard E. Wallace (Wally) Hamilton, Shelly updated the facilities and equipment necessary for film production, including optical sound recording, an essential component for commercial motion pictures. By the late 1930s, Shelly was producing quality industrial and sponsored films for the BC market, eventually combining the operations of the two companies under the name Vancouver Motion Pictures.

Shelly brought professional colour film production to Vancouver, adopting the Cinecolor bi-pack (two-negative) colour process. The companies also provided film processing, titling and sound work, and "coming attractions" trailers. On three bigger-budget 35 mm films produced for the Travel Bureau in 1940–42, intended for theatrical distribution to US audiences, he hired crew members from Hollywood, including cinematographer Ray Fernstrom, narrator Gayne Whitman, and director and editor Ed Taylor.

The regular staff working at VMP included many people who would play important roles in the development of the Canadian film and television industry. They included directors Oscar C. Burritt, Lew Parry, cinematographers Ernie Kirkpatrick, Don Lytle, and Mel Parry; editors Maureen Balfe and Hellen Semmens; and titling artist/art director/animator Marguerite Roozeboom (nee Goulding).

The war years proved critical in the emergence of filmmaking on Canada's west coast. In 1942–43, VMP began filming BC sequences for the National Film Board of Canada (NFB), which used the material in films for its propaganda series Canada Carries On and World In Action. In three of these films, Road to Tokyo, Banshees Over Canada and Pincers on Japan, Shelly is credited as cinematographer. In spring 1943, a film industry trade journal reported that the company was "working full blast these days in commercial and government work."

In 1943, Shelly traveled to Ottawa to meet with John Grierson at the NFB. Shelly was keenly interested in acquiring some of the contract propaganda work that was being liberally awarded by the federal government. Grierson gave him the job of producing the films awarded by the Master General of Ordnance. While there is only a record of three of these films, there was reportedly an 'endless stream' of them. By 1946, Shelly had co-produced half a dozen additional documentaries with the NFB.

== Shelley Films (Toronto) ==
When he acquired all of this new work, Shelly created "Shelley Films" and moved the operation to Toronto. (He added a second 'e' to his company's name, to differentiate it from his family name.) Much of the Vancouver Motion Pictures staff moved there with him, with the exception of Lew Parry, who stayed in Vancouver and started his own production company, eventually becoming BC's most prolific filmmaker. Parry would, however, direct three of the NFB films that Shelly produced: Jasper, Limbs to Order and Road to Recovery. Parry's Vancouver art director and animator, Marguerite (Goulding) Roozeboom, also stayed behind, and eventually founded Pageant Productions with her husband, cinematographer Bill Roozeboom.

Based in Toronto, Shelly was able to expand his client base to include provincial government organizations and national companies. One of his productions, Beans of Bounty (1948), was co-winner in the Non-Theatrical category at the 1st Canadian Film Awards presentation in 1949.

In the late 1950s, Shelley Films discontinued most film production to focus on television commercials, laboratory work and the printing of Hollywood feature films.

== Personal life and death ==
In 1946, Shelly married Catharina Vanderpant, daughter of the Dutch-Canadian photographer John Vanderpant. They had three children. He was a member of the Toronto Rotary Club, the founder and past president of the Consumer Health Organization of Canada, co-founder of the Family Life Foundation, and founder of Corporate Concern. In 1987, Shelly died at his home in Toronto at the age of 81.

== Filmography (partial) ==
Motion Skreenadz Ltd.

- Why? (Pacific Milk advertising trailer, c. 1927) – Rare extant example of a Motion Skreenadz trailer with sound track
- The Story of Canadian Salmon (for British Columbia Packers and Clover Leaf Packers, 1939)

Vancouver Motion Pictures Ltd. (pre-Shelly era)

- Dominion Day crowds witness world champion sprinters in action at Hastings Park, 1927
- A Typical British Columbia Logging Operation (for the Thomsen and Clark Timber Company, 1929)
- Old Hastings Mill Store Moved (attributed to VMP), 1930
- Grand Opening of Vernon's Civic Airport, Vernon, B.C., 1931
- Governor General his excellency the Right Honourable the Earl of Bessborough, PC, GCMG, and her excellency the Countess of Bessborough visit Britannia Mines on Commodore E. W. Hamber's steam yacht "Vencedor" of the RVYC, 1932
- Lest We Forget (for the Department of National Defence, 1935)

Vancouver Motion Pictures Ltd. (Shelly era)

- Behind the Headlines (for the Vancouver Daily Province, 1939)
- Blackout (Civil Air Raid Precautions, 1940)
- Beautiful British Columbia (for the BC Government Travel Bureau, 1940) – Lost
- Valley of Blossoms (Twentieth Century Fox, 1941) - as director
- British Columbia Sports, a.k.a. Evergreen Playland, (for the BC Government Travel Bureau, 1941)
- North of the Border (for the BC Government Travel Bureau, 1942)
- Apple Valley (for BC Tree Fruits Ltd., 1942)
- Coffee for Canadians (for Nabob Foods of Kelly Douglas Limited, 1942)
- Coffeeland to Canada (for Nabob Foods of Kelly Douglas Limited, 1942)
- Road to Tokyo (National Film Board of Canada, 1942) – as cinematographer
- Banshees Over Canada (for the National Film Board of Canada, 1943) – British Columbia sequences only
- Pincers on Japan (National Film Board of Canada, 1943) – as cinematographer
- The Story of Ordnance (for the National Film Board of Canada, 1944)
- Ordnance at Work (for the National Film Board of Canada, 1944)
- Highlights of Ordnance (for the National Film Board of Canada, 1944)
- Tomorrow's Timber (for Dominion Forest Services/Dept. of Mines and Resources Canada, 1944)
- River of Paper (for the Powell River Company, 1944)
- Salmon for Food (for B.C. Packers, c. 1945)
- The Herring Hunters (for B.C. Packers, c. 1945)
- Limbs to Order (co-produced with the National Film Board of Canada, 1945)
- Of Japanese Descent (for the Canadian Department of Labour, co-produced with the National Film Board of Canada, 1945)
- Road to Recovery`(co-produced with the National Film Board of Canada, 1948)

Shelley Films

- Salmon Run (co-produced with the National Film Board of Canada, 1945)
- Valiant Company (for General Motors of Canada, 1945)
- Land of Sky Blue Waters (for B.C. Tree Fruits Ltd., 1946)
- Jasper (for the National Film Board of Canada, 1946)
- Niagara the Powerful (for the Hydro Electric Power Commission of Ontario, 1946)
- Motoring in the Maritimes (for Imperial Oil, 1947)
- Search Unending : The History of Oil Operations in Canada (for Imperial Oil, 1947)
- Royal Winter Fair (for Imperial Tobacco Canada, 1948)
- Something to Chew On (for the Dept. of National Health and Welfare, 1948)
- Beans of Bounty (for Victory Mills, 1949)
- Oil for Canada (for Imperial Oil, 1949)
- Modern Brazil (client unknown, c 1949)
- Timagami Ranger (for the Ontario Department of Lands and Forests, [ca. 1946–50])
- Farm Forestry (for Department of Lands and Forests Ontario, [ca. 1946–50])
- Light with Father (for the Hydro Electric Power Commission of Ontario, 1950)
- Vacations in Quebec (for Imperial Oil, c 1950)
- Shop Talk (for Robert Simpson Co., Simpsons, 1952)
- The Wealth of the Nation (for Abitibi Power and Paper Company, 1952)
- A Good Place to Live (for Thompson Products, 1956)
- The Old Fabric (for Upper Canada College, 1958)
- Atlas Bowling Centre (commercial, 1962)
- Return of the Forests (for Department of Lands and Forests Ontario, c 1966)
- Premier Frost's Election Speech, c 1969
