= Shankhonad =

2004 Bangladeshi drama film

- Shankhonad movie poster
- Bengali: শঙ্খনাদ
- Directed by: Abu Sayeed
- Screenplay by: Abu Sayeed
- Based on: Urey Jaay Nishi Pokkhi by Nasreen Jahan
- Produced by: Anjan Chowdhury Pintu; Abu Sayeed
- Starring: Zahid Hasan; KS Firoz; Nazma Anwar; Fazlur Rahman Babu
- Cinematography: Mahfuzur Rahman Khan
- Edited by: Junaid Halim
- Music by: S I Tutul
- Production company: Machranga Productions Limited
- Release date: 2004
- Running time: 102 minutes
- Country: Bangladesh
- Language: Bengali

Shankhonad (Bengali: শঙ্খনাদ, Wail of the Conch) is a 2004 Bangladeshi drama film directed by Abu Sayeed. It stars Zahid Hasan, KS Firoz, Nazma Anwar, and Fazlur Rahman Babu.

== Plot ==
Osman returns to his ancestral village on a stormy night, the same village he had fled in the dark of the night 27 years ago. He finds shelter in the home of Mannaf Khan, a village elder. Without disclosing his identity, Osman seeks to rediscover his childhood and goes about reliving the past through childhood memories. He meets Kunjo Buri who had nursed him as an infant. He also meets his boyhood friend Fazlu. Osman is not after worldly gains, he wants to spend the rest of his life in the village, and relive the nostalgia of bygone days. That, however, is not to be. He comes face to face with a reality of a markedly different kind, when Mannaf Khan realizes he is the son of the pair his father murdered.

"After more than 27 years of absence Chand returns to his birthplace in a stormy night. When he was still a child his parents were killed and the murderer seized his fields. Without exposing his real identity he meets the people that characterized his childhood: the sorceress Kunjuburi, his friend Fazlu and the son of his parents' murderer, Mannaf Khan. The latter welcomes him at first cordially, but when he comes to know his real identity he tries to get rid of him."

== Cast ==
- Zahid Hasan as Osman
- KS Firoz as Mannaf Khan
- Nazma Anwar as Kujo Buri
- Fazlur Rahman Babu as Fazlu
- Krishnendu
- Rebeka Dipa
- Insan Ali
- Mehnaz Parveen Bani

== Festival participations ==
- Official selection, Fribourg International Film Festival
- Official selection, Asian African & Latin American Film Festival
- Official selection, Commonwealth Film Festival
- Official selection, Dubai International Film Festival
- Official selection, International Film Festival, India

== Reception ==
Writing in Variety, Deborah Young praised Mahfuzur Rahman Khan's camerawork, but said the convoluted narrative structure "is urgently in need of a substantial re-edit to make the storytelling more logical".

== Award ==
- National Film Award in three categories, 2004
- Best Film, Meril-Prothom Alo 2004
