= Federation of Film Societies of Bangladesh =

Bangladesh Federation of Film Societies (BFFS) is a national umbrella organization for film societies in Bangladesh. It promotes film culture, appreciation, screenings, festivals, and collaboration among film societies. BFFS is the country’s sole member of the International Federation of Film Societies. It coordinates Bangladesh's selection process for the Academy Awards' International Feature Film category.

== History ==
It was established on 19 October 1975.

International Film Festival Bangladesh (2003): Presented approximately 130 films from 36 countries.

Second International Film Festival Bangladesh (2004): Featured approximately 115 films from around 40 countries.

Third International Film Festival of Bangladesh (2006): Planned screenings of approximately 120 films from 55 countries.

National Film Society Conference/ National Convention for Film Societies

BFFS organizes national conferences bringing together film societies, filmmakers, academics, and film activists to discuss the development of cinema and film culture.

The 2025 conference addressed declining audiences, financial difficulties, access to quality films, and challenges faced by regional film societies. The National Film Society Conference 2026 was held at the Bangladesh Film Archive in Agargaon, Dhaka, on 16 May 2026.

98th Academy Awards (2026 ceremony): Bangladesh selected Barir Naam Shahana (A House Named Shahana), directed by Leesa Gazi.

99th Academy Awards (2027 ceremony): Bangladesh selected Roid (রইদ), directed by Mejbaur Rahman Sumon.

== Activities ==
The federation has organized international film festivals, screenings, seminars, and awards. Its notable activities include:

BFFS coordinates the Oscar Bangladesh Committee, which evaluates eligible Bangladeshi films for submission to the Academy Awards' International Feature Film category. The committee assesses submitted films and announces Bangladesh's official selection.
