= Bengali theatre =

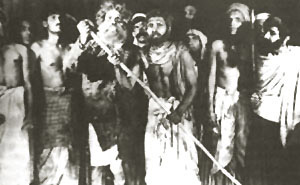
A scene from Nabanna.

Bengali theatre primarily refers to theatre performed in the Bengali language. Bengali theatre is produced mainly in West Bengal, and in Bangladesh. The term may also refer to some Hindi theatres which are accepted by the Bengali people.

Bengali theatre has its origins in British rule. It began as private entertainment in the early 19th century. In the pre-independence period, Bengali theatres played a pivotal role in manifesting dislike of the British Raj. After the independence of India in 1947, leftist movements in West Bengal used theatre as a tool for social awareness. This added some unique characteristics to the art form that still have strong effects. These groups differentiate themselves ideologically from commercial Bengali theatre.

== Types ==
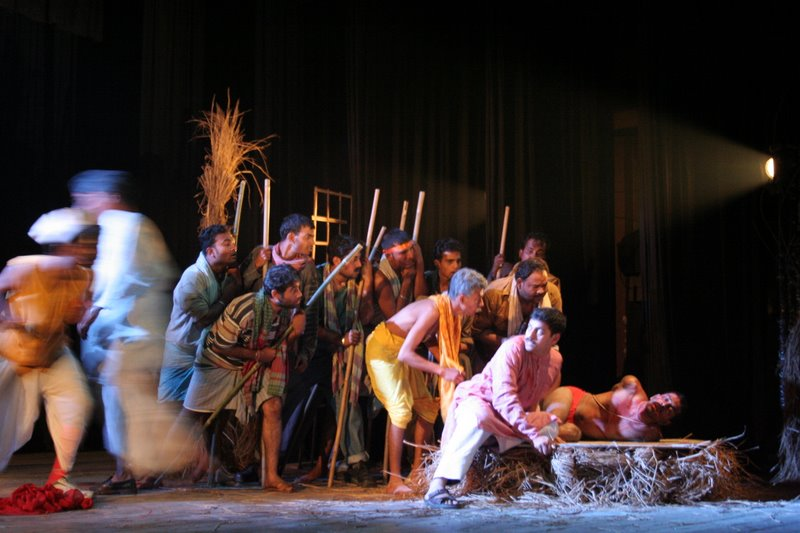
Play Tohar Gaon Bhi Ek Din staged by Sreejansena group

The many theatres in West Bengal can be broadly divided into Kolkata-based theatres and rural theatres. Outside Bengali-speaking areas, the term "Bengali theatre" primarily refers to Kolkata-based groups, as the rural theatres are less well-known. The two types are similar in form and content, but the Kolkata-based theatres are better funded and staffed. This is mainly due to the influx of expertise from rural areas to Kolkata in search of a larger audience.

There are also Bengali folk theatres. There are many dialects of Bengali spoken in West Bengal and Bangladesh. The larger Bengali theatres use the dialect spoken in Kolkata, Bengali folk theatres have performances in some of the other Bengali dialects.

There is another category of Bengali theatre called Jatra, which is run commercially in rural West Bengal and Bangladesh. This traditional Bengali theatre form is mostly performed by travelling troupes. The most prominent characteristics of Jatra are melodramatic contents and presentation, exaggerated expressions and movements, and an extensive use of traditional musical instruments. Jatra originally explored subjects concerning the tales of Radha-Krishna. But at present, it has been modernized to feature crisis through stories. Many popular Bengali film artists participate in Jatra.

Hindi theatres which are accepted by the Bengali people include the productions of Rangakarmee (established 1976) directed by Usha Ganguly, and productions by Padatik (established 1972) under Shyamanand Jalan, who started with Anamika in 1955.

Following the independence of Pakistan in 1947, religion-based nationalism was strong and affected the theatre in eastern Bengal. In East Pakistan (modern-day Bangladesh), playwrights emerged such as Ibrahim Khan (1894–1978), Ibrahim Khalil (b. 1916), Akbar ad-Din (1895–1978) and others. These playwrights would create plays related to the Islamic history of the subcontinent and Middle East, glorifying past Muslim rulers as well as the history of the Pakistan Movement.

Natyaguru Nurul Momen was the pioneer by breaking away from these dramas glorifying Islam & moved to Bengali Nationalism. He believed that, Bengalis are Bengalis first, then next comes his religion. He was the trailblazer & doyen of Bengali theatre's progressiveness & secular tradition. Natyaguru Nurul Momen's maiden play "Rupantor" and 2nd play Nemesis (Momen play) ushered in the Bengali nationalism in Bengali theatre; which imbibed Bengali nationalism in the theatrical & cultural fields and eventually, that led to the independence of Bangladesh.

== Music ==
The late 19th- and early 20th-century theatres had their own Bengali music. This form was pioneered by Girish Chandra Ghosh; the era of Bengali theatre before him laid the groundwork, and after his death Bengali theatre music became more experimental. During the era of Girish Chandra, all stage-plays included some form of traditional Bengali music, and dancer-singers who performed before and between the acts. Mythological plays would have Kirtan-anga songs, epics would include indigenous styles such as khyāmtā, and comedies and farcical plays often included tappā songs by Nidhu Babu.

== Notable people ==
=== Bangladesh ===
- Abdullah Al Mamun
- Abdul Kader
- Abul Hayat
- Abul Khair
- Abdullah Hel Mahmud
- Afsana Mimi
- Ahmed Rubel
- Aly Zaker
- Asaduzzaman Noor
- ATM Shamsuzzaman
- Azizul Hakim
- Bijori Barkatullah
- Ejajul Islam
- Enamul Haque
- Ferdousi Mazumder
- Faiz Zahir
- Golam Mustafa
- Hridi Haque
- Humayun Faridi
- Jayanta Chattopadhyay
- Khairul Alam Sabuj
- KS Firoz
- Laila Hasan
- Litu Anam
- Lucky Enam
- Lutfun Nahar Lata
- Malay Bhowmick
- Mamunur Rashid
- Masud Ali Khan
- Momtazuddin Ahmed
- Munier Choudhury
- Nasiruddin Yousuff
- Nazma Anwar
- Nazmul Huda Bachchu
- Natyaguru Nurul Momen
- Sara Zaker
- Saleh Ahmed
- Shabnam
- Shahiduzzaman Selim
- Shamima Nazneen
- Shanta Islam
- Sikandar Abu Zafar
- Selim Al Deen
- Subhash Dutta
- Suborna Mustafa
- Tamalika Karmakar
- Wahida Mollick Jolly

=== West Bengal ===
- Ajitesh Bandopadhyay
- Asit Bandopadhyay
- Sisir Bhaduri
- Ardhendu Sekhar Mustafi
- Bijon Bhattacharya
- Kshirode Prasad Vidyavinode
- Mohit Chattopadhyay
- Utpal Dutt
- Michael Madhusudan Dutta
- Girish Chandra Ghosh
- Debshankar Haldar
- Dinabandhu Mitra
- Manoj Mitra
- Sambhu Mitra
- Tripti Mitra
- Shobha Sen
- Soumitra Chattopadhyay
- Dwijendralal Ray
- Badal Sarkar
- Rudraprasad Sengupta
- Jyotirindranath Tagore
- Rabindranath Tagore
- Ramaprasad Banik
- Kaushik Sen
- Bratya Basu
- Goutam Halder
- Arun Mukherjee
- Anirban Bhattacharya
- Debesh Chattopadhyay

== Notable theatre groups ==
=== Bangladesh ===
- Dhaka Theatre – Founded in 1973 by Nasiruddin Yusuf; one of the leading theatre groups in Bangladesh and known for productions rooted in Bengali folk traditions.
- Nagorik Natya Sampraday – Established in 1968 in Dhaka; one of the earliest modern theatre organisations in Bangladesh.
- Aranyak Natyadal – A Dhaka-based theatre troupe founded in 1971 and led by Mamunur Rashid.
- Theatre (Baily Road) – A theatre company established in 1972 by Abdullah Al Mamun and Ramendu Mazumdar.
- Natyachakra – A theatre group founded in Dhaka in 1972 and active in the Bangladeshi group theatre movement.
- Padatik Natya Sangsad – Founded in 1978; known for productions addressing social issues and national history.
- Anushilan Natyadal – Established in 1979 in Rajshahi and known for socially conscious stage and street theatre.
- Arindam Natya Sampraday – A Chattogram-based theatre troupe active since the 1970s.
- Tirjak Natyadal – A theatre group from Chattogram involved in the regional group theatre movement.

=== West Bengal ===
- Bohurupee Kolkata, India
- Bratyajon West Bengal, India
- Indian People's Theatre Association (IPTA) and its branches
- Nandikar Kolkata, India
- Chetana Kolkata, India
- Swapnasandhani Kolkata, India
- Sansriti Kolkata, India
- Bengal Repertory
- Sahil Nandi
