= Bipasha Hayat =

Bangladeshi actress, model, painter and playback singer

- বিপাশা হায়াত
- Pronunciation: [bipaʃa hae̯at̪]
- Born: 23 March 1971 (age 55)
- Education: MFA
- Alma mater: University of Dhaka
- Occupations: Actress; script writer; painter; playback singer
- Spouse: Tauquir Ahmed (m. 1999)
- Children: 2
- Father: Abul Hayat
- Relatives: Shahed Sharif Khan (brother-in-law)
- Awards: Bangladesh National Film Awards; Meril Prothom Alo Awards

Bipasha Hayat (Note: Bengali: [bipaʃa hae̯at̪].) (Bengali: বিপাশা হায়াত, pronounced [bipaʃa hae̯at̪]; born 23 March 1971) is a Bangladeshi actress, model, painter and playback singer. She won Bangladesh National Film Award for Best Actress for her performance in the film Aguner Poroshmoni (1994). She earned Meril Prothom Alo Awards in 1998, 1999 and 2002.

== Early life and education ==
Hayat completed her master's from the Faculty of Fine Arts, University of Dhaka in 1998. During the 90's Hayat played many popular television dramas. She wrote her first TV play "Shudhui Tomake Jani" in 1997.

== Career ==
=== Acting ===
She acted in two liberation war related movies Aguner Poroshmoni and Joyjatra. The first of those which was directed by Humayun Ahmed, she portrayed the role of a young girl who was blocked in her house with her family inside the city of Dhaka. Ratri as her characters name fell in love with a guerrilla freedom fighter (played by Asaduzzaman Noor) who lived in their house during the war for shelter. Her affection towards the fighter reflects the support and contribution of the civilians to the guerrilla fighters of the war. In Joyjatra, her character was much more different as she acted as a middle-aged mother who lost her son as she tried to escape from an army attack.

=== Painting ===
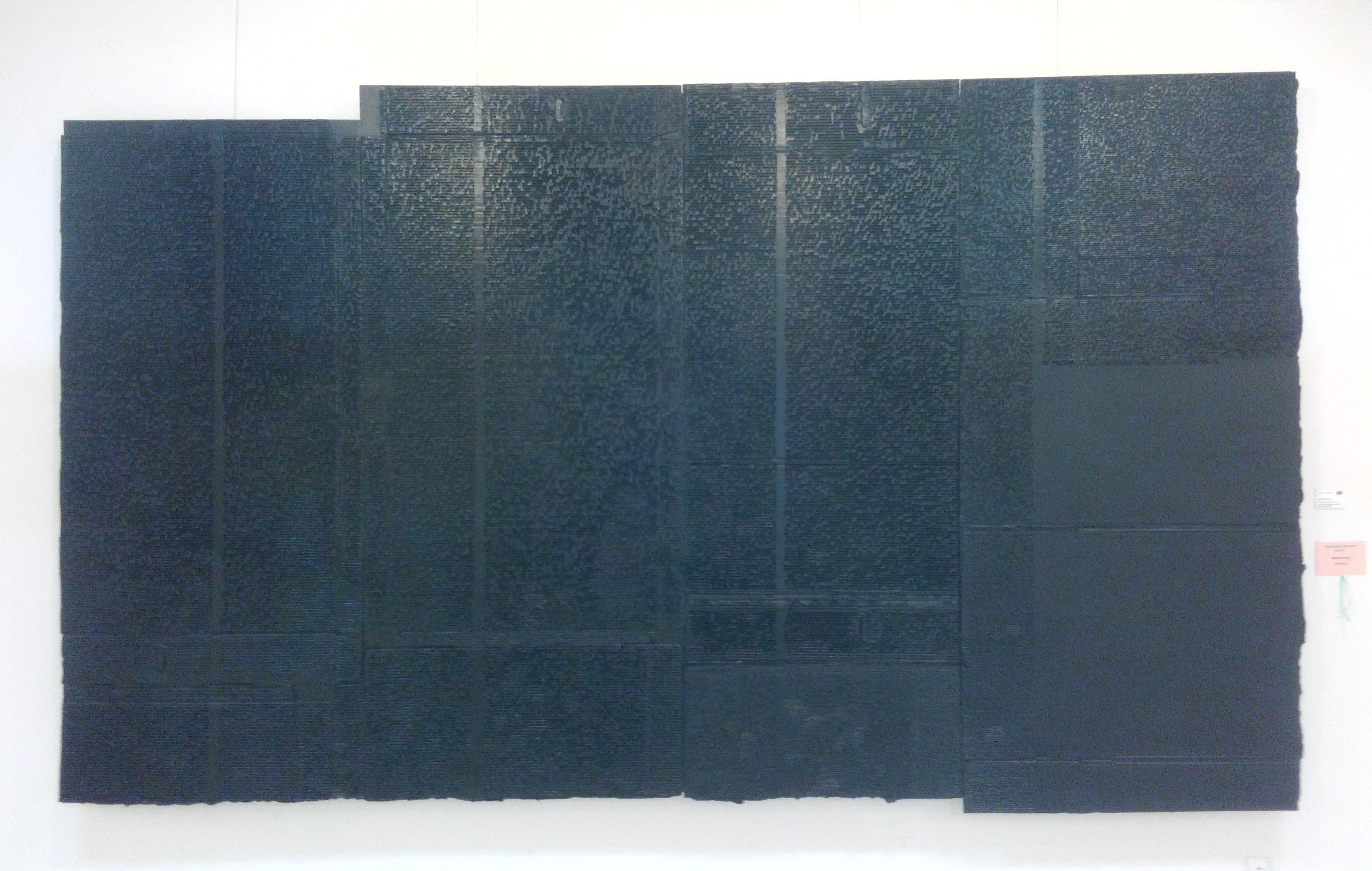
Hayat won an award at the 17th Asian Art Biennale for her mixed-media work Memoir (2016)

Hayat's art works were displayed at Miniature Painting Exhibition in Gallery Tone in Dhaka in 1996. In 1998, she took part in a group art exhibition at Divine Art Gallery in Pan Pacific Sonergaon Hotel. Later, she took part in Nine Contemporary Young Artists Exhibition at Zainul Gallery, FFA in 2002.

Hayat's 6th solo art exhibition titled "Mindscape" held during 14–24 January 2017 in Rome. It showcased 50 of her work, which included acrylics, drawings and cardboard acrylics.

== Personal life ==
Hayat married Tauquir Ahmed, an actor and film director. She is the daughter of actor and director Abul Hayat. Her sister Natasha Hayat and brother-in-law Shahed Sharif Khan both have acting careers. Bipasha and Natasha invested on a boutique house in 2008. She has a daughter named Arisha Ahmed and a son named Aareeb Ahmed. The couple Bipasha Hayat and Tauquir Ahmed is currently living in the US

== Works ==
=== Television dramas ===
Year	Title	Director & Playwright	Co-stars	Notes
1990-1991	Ayomoy	Nawazish Ali Khan; Humayun Ahmed	Asaduzzaman Noor; Abul Hayat; Abul Khair; Dilara Zaman; Dr. Enamul Haque; Saleh Ahmed; Sara Zaker; Lucky Enam; Suborna Mustafa; Afzal Sharif; Mozammel Hossain; KS Firoz; Tarana Halim	
1992	Shongkito Podojatra	Kha Ma Harun & Mansurul Aziz	Zahid Hassan	Serial Drama
1993	Rupnagar			Serial Drama
1996	Harjit	Abul Hayat	Tauquir Ahmed	teleplay
1997	Shudhui Tomake Jani	Bipasha Hayat		drama serial, debut as a playwright
2000	Brishty	Morshedul Islam		
	Beli	Abul Hayat	Tauquir Ahmed	teleplay
	Pratyasha	Abul Hayat	Tauquir Ahmed	teleplay
	Ekjan Aparadhini	Abul Hayat	Tauquir Ahmed	teleplay
	Dola	Abul Hayat	Tauquir Ahmed	drama series
	Hasuli	Abul Hayat	Tauquir Ahmed	drama series
2006	Ontormomo			drama serial, deals with the complexities of human character
2013	Mukhsoh Jibon	Mahmud Didar (both)	Tauquir Ahmed, Kumkum Hasan	teleplay, aired on ntv
2015	Sonali Danar Chil	Abul Hayat (both)	Tauquir Ahmed	teleplay, aired on Channel i on Eid
2015	Kobita Sundor na	Arif Khan; Bipasha Hayat	Afzal Hossain, Mahfuz Ahmed	single episode play, aired on Channel i on Eid

=== Serial dramas ===
Year	Film	Director & Playwright	Notes

=== Films ===
Year	Film	Director	Role	Notes
1994	Aguner Poroshmoni	Humayun Ahmed	Ratri	Debut Film
2004	Joyjatra	Tauquir Ahmed	Haowa	

=== Art ===
==== Art exhibitions ====
- Spontaneity (2002)
- The Journey Within (2011)
- Realms of Memory (2015)
- Mindscape (2017)

==== Poster designs ====
- Fagun Haway
- Haldaa

=== Music ===
- Rupkothar Golpo (2006)

== Awards ==
Bangladesh National Film Awards

- Best Actress - Aguner Poroshmoni (1994)

Meril Prothom Alo Awards

- Best TV Actress (Popular Choice) - 1998, 1999, 2000
