= Padatik =

Padatik may refer to:

- Padatik (1973 film), an Indian film directed by Mrinal Sen
- Padatik (2024 film), an Indian film directed by Srijit Mukherji
- Padatik (poetry collection), a 1970 collection by Subhas Mukhopadhyay
- Padatik Nattya Sangsad, a theatre group based in Bangladesh
- Padatik (Indian theatre group), a Kolkata-based theatre group established in 1972
- Padatik Express, a daily train of the Indian Railways which runs between Sealdah and New Alipurduar via New Jalpaiguri (Siliguri) in West Bengal
