= 1971 Shei Shob Din =

2023 film directed by Hridi Haq

- Poster
- Bengali: ১৯৭১ সেই সব দিন
- Directed by: Hridi Haq
- Produced by: Lucky Enam, Kamruzzaman Ronnie
- Starring: Hridi Haq; Ferdous Ahmed; Litu Anam
- Edited by: Kamruzzaman Ronnie
- Music by: Debojyoti Mishra
- Production company: Ticket Productions
- Release date: 18 August 2023
- Running time: 146 minutes
- Country: Bangladesh
- Language: Bengali
- Budget: ৳20000000 lakh (US$16 billion)
- Box office: ৳35000000 lakh (US$29 billion)

1971 Shei Shob Din is a Bangladeshi film directed by Hridi Haq. This is a government-granted movie that tells the story of the Bangladesh Liberation War. It stars Mamunur Rashid, Jayanta Chattopadhyay, Munmun Ahmed, Shilpi Sarkar Apu, Ferdous Ahmed, Litu Anam, Saju Khadem, Sanjida Preeti, Tareen Jahan, Shajjad Ahmed, Jewel Jahur and others. Litu Anam makes a return to the silver screen after 15 years in this movie. The film was written by director Hridi Haq, based on a concept by her father Enamul Haque.

== Background ==
The film revolves around a family's experiences during 1971, providing a poignant portrayal of the era. Ferdous, Litu Anam and Sajal play the roles of three brothers involved in The Liberation War. Ferdous played the role of a teacher from Dhaka University.

== Release ==
1971 Shei Shob Din was released on 18 August in theatres across Bangladesh. It had its international release in Australia on 10 September, followed by screenings in several states of the United States on 23 October.
