= Foot soldier (disambiguation) =

Foot soldier is a generic term for members of the infantry.

Foot soldier may also refer to:

- The Foot Soldiers, a comic book originally published by Dark Horse Comics
- Padatik (poetry collection) (Foot Soldier), a 1940 book of poetry by Bengali poet Subhash Mukhopadhyay
- Foot Soldier, a 1998 television program on the History Channel, hosted by Richard Karn
- Characters in the Teenage Mutant Ninja Turtles television series who belong to the Foot Clan
- "Foot Soldier", a song by American rapper Rich Homie Quan from the 2018 album Rich as in Spirit
- "Foot Soldier", a song by Icelandic singer-songwriter Björk, a b-side from her 2001 single "Hidden Place".
