= Dewan Nurunnabi =

Bangladeshi politician

- দেওয়ান নুরুন্নবী

Member of Parliament from Nilphamari-2
- In office 1986–1991
- Preceded by: Seats start
- Succeeded by: Md. Shamsuddoha
- Incumbent
- Assumed office 1988
- Preceded by: Md. Shamsuddoha
- Succeeded by: Ahsan Ahmed
- In office February 1996 – June 1996

Personal details
- Died: 10 October 2013 Dhaka, Bangladesh
- Party: Bangladesh Nationalist Party
- Other political affiliations: Jatiya Party

Dewan Nurunnabi was a politician from the Nilphamari District of Bangladesh and an elected member of parliament from Nilphamari-2.

== Career ==
Nurunnabi was elected to parliament from Nilphamari-2 as a Jatiya Party candidate in 1986 and 1988. After that he joined the Bangladesh Nationalist Party. and was elected to parliament from Nilphamari-2 as a Bangladesh Nationalist Party candidate in 15 February 1996 Bangladeshi general election.

He died on 10 October 2013 in Dhaka.
