= Bohubrihi =

- বহুব্রীহি
- Genre: Sitcom
- Written by: Humayun Ahmed
- Starring: Abul Hayat; Aleya Ferdousi; Aly Zaker; Lutfun Nahar Lota; Nahid Zaman; Asaduzzaman Noor; Afzal Sharif; Mahmuda Khatun; Torsha; Rehnuma Tarannum; Lucky Enam; Afzal Hossain; Abul Khair; Nazmul Huda Bachchu; Dipa Islam
- Country of origin: Bangladesh
- Original language: Bengali
- No. of seasons: 1
- No. of episodes: 26

Production
- Producer: Nawazish Ali Khan

Original release
- Network: Bangladesh Television
- Release: 1988 – 1989

Bohubrihi is a Bangladeshi television drama series created by Humayun Ahmed, which aired on Bangladesh Television from 1988 to 1989. Adapted from the novel by the same name, the series quickly gained widespread popularity for its engaging storyline, memorable characters, and insightful commentary on societal norms and human relationships.

Set in Dhaka, the capital city of Bangladesh, Bohubrihi follows the lives of a diverse group of characters, each grappling with their own struggles, aspirations, and interpersonal dynamics. Bohubrihi is considered a timeless classic from the 90s cable-TV era in Bangladesh.

== Premise ==
The main characters of the Sitcom is Mr. Sobhan, who is a wealthy retired family person living with his family in Dhanmondi, Dhaka in a house named "Niribili". And the main characteristics of this person is he is always involve in finding social and cultural problems around him, but unfortunately all his plan fails at the end as almost every problems he found had nothing to do with the reality. He loves to write down the problems in a big note books and his wife Minu was always irritated with that. Mr. Anis was a tenant in his house, who is a widower having two children, only thing he was good at was giving people a good suggestion. All the problems identified by Mr. Sobhan was always criticized by Mr. Anis, until one day when Mr. Sobhan came up with the idea to work with the names of the martyrs of 1971 Bangladesh Liberation War.

== Cast ==
The major casts of the drama serial were as follows.

- Abul Hayat as Mr. Sobhan
- Aleya Ferdousi as Minu, Mr. Sobhan's wife
- Aly Zaker as Farid Mama
- Lutfun Nahar Lota as Mili
- Nahid Zaman as Bilu
- Asaduzzaman Noor as Anis
- Afzal Sharif as Kader
- Mahmuda Khatun as Rahima's mother
- Torsha Khan as Togor
- Rehnuma Tarannum as Nisha
- Lucky Enam as Esha
- Afzal Hossain as doctor
- Abul Khair as Emdad Khondokar
- Nazmul Huda Bachchu as Karim
- Dipa Islam as Putul
