= Nilphamari (disambiguation) =

Nilphamari can refer to the following in northern Bangladesh:

- Nilphamari District
- Nilphamari Sadar Upazila
- Nilphamari, the city
- Nilphamari-1, an assembly constituency
- Nilphamari-2, an assembly constituency
- Nilphamari-3, an assembly constituency
- Nilphamari-4, an assembly constituency
