= Ke Hotey Chay Kotipoti =

2011 Bangladeshi television quiz show

- Logo
- Bengali: কে হতে চায় কোটিপতি?
- Genre: Quiz Show
- Created by: Delta Bay Production
- Based on: Who Wants to Be a Millionaire?
- Presented by: Asaduzzaman Noor
- Composers: Matthew Strachan; Keith Strachan; Ramon Covalo; Nick Magnus
- Country of origin: Bangladesh
- Original language: Bengali
- No. of seasons: 1
- No. of episodes: 52

Production
- Running time: 60 minutes
- Production companies: Delta Bay Production & Distribution Pvt. Ltd. Sony Pictures Television

Original release
- Network: Desh TV
- Release: 10 July – 2 November 2011

Related
- Kaun Banega Crorepati; Who Wants To Be A Millionaire

Ke Hotey Chay Kotipoti? (Bengali: কে হতে চায় কোটিপতি?, also mentioned as Ke Hote Chay Kotipoti or KHK) is a Bangladeshi game show based on the original British format of Who Wants to Be a Millionaire?. The program was broadcast from 10 July to 2 November 2011.

The show was aired every week from Sunday to Tuesday at 9:45 pm.

There were 52 episodes in the show. It was a Delta Bay Bangladesh production and Delta Bay was the official licensee for the show in Bangladesh. It was broadcast on the Bangladeshi TV station Desh TV. Cultural personality Asaduzzaman Noor hosted the show.

== History ==
Who Wants to Be a Millionaire? has achieved recognition worldwide. In Bangladesh, the Hindi version, Kaun Banega Crorepati, has been airing since 2000. This set the groundwork for Desh TV to arrange the show. Ke Hotay Chay Kotipoti is Bangladesh's first official global franchise show.

== Rules ==
As in the UK version, the contestants must undergo an initial round of "Fastest Finger First", in which the host introduces the ten contestants of the episode and asks them all the same question. The contestants must then arrange the answers in the order described in the question. The contestant that places the four options in the correct order in the fastest time gets the chance to go on the "hotseat".

All contestants must be over the age of 18 and a citizen of Bangladesh in order to be eligible. The person must not be a former "Ke Hotey Chay Kotipoti" contestant and must be a resident of Bangladesh.

At the hot seat, the contestant is asked a series of general knowledge questions consistently rising in difficulty with every question. Each question has four options with only one correct answer. The contestant wins a certain amount of money with each correct answer, and may choose to give up and retain the money they have already won if they decide not to answer the currently shown question. There is no Time Limit.

The money won after each question is roughly doubled from the previous amount won, exponentially increasing the amount won after each correct answer until the contestant reaches the final question, after which they win the maximum prize (currently Tk. 1 crores/- in KHK 1).

== Lifelines ==
- Ask The Audience: If the contestant uses this lifeline, it will result in the host repeating the question to the audience. The studio audience get 10 seconds to answer the question. Audience members use touch pads to designate what they believe the correct answer to be. After the audience have chosen their choices, the results are displayed to the contestant in percentages in bar-graph format and also shown on the monitors screens of the host and contestant, as well as the TV viewers.
- Phone a Friend: If the contestant uses this lifeline, the contestant is allowed to call one of the three pre-arranged friends, who all have to provide their phone numbers in advance. The host usually starts off by talking to the contestant's friend and introduces him/her to the viewers. After the introduction, the host hands the phone call over to the contestant who then immediately has 30 seconds to ask and hope for a reply from their friend.
- Fifty-Fifty (50:50): If the contestant uses this lifeline, the host will ask the computer to randomly remove and eliminate two of the "wrong" answers. This will leave one right answer and one wrong answer, resulting in a situation of eliminating 50% of the choices as well as having a 50% chance of getting the answer right if the contestant is in a situation of making a guess.

== Money tree ==
No.	Winnings for right answer	Winnings if walk away	Winning for wrong answer
1	Tk. 1,000/-	Tk. 0/-	Tk. 0/-
2	Tk. 2,000/-	Tk. 1,000/-	Tk. 0/-
3	Tk. 3,000/-	Tk. 2,000/-	Tk. 0/-
4	Tk. 5,000/-	Tk. 3,000/-	Tk. 0/-
5	Tk. 10,000/- (guaranteed sum)	Tk. 5,000/-	Tk. 0/-
6	Tk. 20,000/-	Tk. 10,000/-	Tk. 10,000/-
7	Tk. 40,000/-	Tk. 20,000/-	Tk. 10,000/-
8	Tk. 80,000/-	Tk. 40,000/-	Tk. 10,000/-
9	Tk. 1,60,000/-	Tk. 80,000/-	Tk. 10,000/-
10	Tk. 3,20,000/- (guaranteed sum)	Tk. 1,60,000/-	Tk. 10,000/-
11	Tk. 6,40,000/-	Tk. 3,20,000/-	Tk. 3,20,000/-
12	Tk. 12,50,000/-	Tk. 6,40,000/-	Tk. 3,20,000/-
13	Tk. 25,00,000/-	Tk. 12,50,000/-	Tk. 3,20,000/-
14	Tk. 50,00,000/-	Tk. 25,00,000/-	Tk. 3,20,000/-
15	Tk. 1,00,00,000/-	Tk. 50,00,000/-	Tk. 3,20,000/-

== Notable celebrity guests ==
=== Season 1 ===
Guest(s)	Year	Amount won	Notes	Ref.
Shakib Khan and Apu Biswas	2011	Tk. 12,50,000/-	First celebrity guests to play the game, played for an organization	
Chanchal Chowdhury and Nusrat Imrose Tisha	2011	Tk. 12,50,000/-	Second celebrity guests to play the game, played for an organization	
Partha Barua and Naquib Khan	2011	Tk. 25,00,000/-	Third celebrity guests to play the game, played for an organization	
Aly Zaker and Sara Zaker	2011	Tk. 25,00,000/-	Fourth celebrity guests to play the game, played for an organization	
