= Subhash Mukhopadhyay (poet) =

Indian poet and translator

- Subhash Mukhopadhyay
- Born: 12 February 1919; Krishnanagar, Bengal Presidency, British India
- Died: 8 July 2003 (aged 84); Kolkata, West Bengal, India
- Occupation: Poet
- Writing career
- Genres: novels, poetry, libretto

Subhash Mukhopadhyay (Shubhash Mukhopaddhae; 12 February 1919 – 8 July 2003) was one of the foremost Indian Bengali poets of the 20th century. He is also known as the "podatik kobi" ("foot-soldier poet") in the field of Bengali literature. A book of thirty of Subhash's best known poems in English translation, titled ' As Day is Breaking', was published in 2014 by Anjan Basu, a Bangalore-based writer/critic. The book includes a rather detailed introduction to the poet's work as well. He was honoured with Jnanpith Award in 1991.

== Early life ==
Mukhopadhyay was born in 1919 in Krishnanagar, a town in Nadia district in the province of West Bengal. An excellent student, he studied philosophy at the Scottish Church College in Calcutta, graduating with honours in 1941.

== Career ==
Like his contemporary Sukanta Bhattacharya, Mukhopadhyay developed strong political beliefs at an early age. He was deeply committed to the cause of social justice, and was active in left-wing student politics through his college years. Following graduation, he formally joined the Communist Party of India. He thus became one of a handful of literary practitioners with first-hand experience as a party worker and activist.

In 1940, while still a student, he published his first volume of poetry Padatik (Pedestrian). Many critics regard this book as a milestone in the development of modern Bengali poetry. It represented a clear departure from the earlier Kallol generation of poets; and Subhash's distinctive, direct voice, allied with his technical skill and radical world-view, gained him great popularity. In his poetry, Subhash grappled with the massive upheavals of that era which ruptured Bengali society from top to bottom. The 1940s were marked by world war, famine, partition, communal riots and mass emigration in Bengal. Subhash's writings broke away from the traditional moorings of the establishment poets, and instead addressed the despair and disillusion felt by the common people. He remained throughout his life an advocate of the indivisibility of the Bengali people and Bengali culture. His radical activism continued unabated. He was one of the leaders of the "Anti-Fascist Writers' and Artists' Association", formed in March 1942 in reaction to the murder of Somen Chanda, a fellow-writer and Marxist activist. Subhash remained attached with the Communist Party until 1982, and spent time in jail as a political prisoner briefly in the late 1960s. From the late 1950s onwards, Subhash's poetry evolved into something more personal and introspective. The lyricism of Phul phutuk na phutuk, aaj Boshonto, one of his most famous poems, was a result of this period.

Later in the 1970s, Subhash's poetry took a turn toward the narrative and the allegorical. But he never lost his technical facility nor his unique voice. Besides verse, Subhash also wrote works of prose including novels, essays and travelogues. He was active in journalism too, having served on the editorial staff of daily and weekly newspapers. He was an editor of the leading Bengali literary journal Parichay. He was also an accomplished and popular writer for children. He edited the Bengali children's periodical Sandesh jointly with Satyajit Ray for a few years in the early sixties.

Besides the above, Subhash's work as a translator is notable. He is credited with having translated many of Nazim Hizmet's works into Bengali (from Turkish).

== Personal life ==
Mukhopadhyay married Gita Bandyopadhyay, also a well-known writer, in 1951. They adopted three daughters, and later two more daughters and a son.

He had an older brother named Narayan Mukhopadhyay, who died many years ago in his youth. Narayan had a daughter named Taniya Mukherjee and a son called Ashish Mukherjee, from his wife Mira Mukherjee, who was a teacher by profession.

Subhash suffered from severe heart and kidney ailments, and died in Kolkata in July 2003, at the age of 84. He was survived by his wife Geeta Bandopadhyay.

== Awards ==
Mukhopadhyay received numerous awards and honours in his lifetime, including the two highest literary prizes in India: the Sahitya Akademi Award in 1964 (for Joto Dureii Jai), and the Jnanpith Award in 1991. The Government of India awarded the civilian honour of the Padma Bhushan in 2003.

== Bibliography ==
=== Sample work ===
- Excerpt from Phul phutuk na phutuk, aaj Boshonto

Phul phutuk na phutuk, aaj Boshonto

Shaan-badhano footpath-ey
Pathorey paa dubiye
Ek katth-khotta gachh
Kochi kochi patae

Paanjor phatiye hashchhey.

Translation to English:

Whether flowers bloom or not, it's Spring today

Standing on the concrete pavement
Dipping his toes into the rock
A curmudgeonly tree
Decked out in new leaves

Laughs his heart out.

- English translation of the poem Jol Saite

When you see, may you not feel hurt,
May your sight be soothed and you feel good,
For that
I have stuck flowers in all the thorns pricked in my breast,
Do smile.
May you not feel sad when you hear,
May your ears be soothed with sweet sound and you feel good,
For that
I have wrapped my weeping heart in melodious tunes

Do smile, all ye, do enjoy...

== Notable works ==
- Padatik (The Foot Soldier)
- Chirkut (The Parchment)
- Agnikone
- Phul Phutuk (Let the Flowers Bloom)
- Joto Dureii Jai (How Distant I may be)
- E Bhai (Hey, Brother)
- Kaal Modhumash (Tomorrow is Spring)
- Cheley Gechhey Boney (The Son has gone to Exile)
- Bangalir Itihaash (History of Bengalis)
- Desh Bidesher Rupkotha (Fairy Tales from Home and Abroad)

== Recognition ==
- Sahitya Akademi Award, 1964
- Deshikottam Award, 1970
- Afro-Asian Lotus Prize, 1977
- Kumaran Asan Award, 1982
- Mirzo Tursunzoda Prize (USSR), 1982
- Ananda Puraskar, 1991
- Soviet Land Nehru Award
- Jnanpith Award, 1991.

He was a fellow of the Sahitya Akademi, and was the Deputy Secretary of the Progressive Writers' Union. He was conferred Deshikottama (Honorary D.Litt.) by the Visva-Bharati University, Santiniketan. He was the Organizer-General of the Afro-Asian Writers' Association in 1983. He was also a member of the Executive Board of the Sahitya Akademi since 1987.

The U.S. Library of Congress has a collection of forty titles by him including translations.

== Legacy ==
- In 2010 a metro railways station in Kolkata Kavi Subhash Metro Station has been named after poet.
- In 2009 Sealdah-NJP Express was named "Padatik Express" after this book in memory of the poet.
