= Shaju Khadem =

Bangladeshi actor and comedian

Shaju Khadem is a prominent Bangladeshi actor and comedian whose work is predominant in television.

He has starred in popular dramas like “Doll's House”, “Gohine”, “Poush Faguner Pala”, “Besto Doctor” and “Alok Nagar”. He has featured in many other popular one-hour-dramas. He was an art director for Banglavision.

== Career ==
Khadem started his career in 1997 by stage dramas. Later in 1999, he got the leading role in silent comedy serial Bholar Diary on ETV. Then, he planned and directed a popular show titled “Raat Biraate”. He made his film debut in the movie Common Gender, playing the role of a hermaphrodite or Hijra. He has acted in numerous television dramas like “Kobiraj Golap Shah”, “Oloshpur”, “Poush Faguner Pala”, “Chor Kabyo” and “Gronthikgon Kohe”, “Ponchom” by Omlan Bishwash, “Mombasa” by Shihab Shaheen and two more dramas titled “Iti Dulabhai” and “Facebook”. Mozeza Ashraf Monalisa made her debut with the drama "Chupichupi" opposite Shaju.

== Personal life ==
Khdem is married to actress Protitee Haque, she is the sister of actress Hridi Haque and sister-in-law of actor Litu Anam.

== Films ==
Common Gender (2012) as Sushmita / Sushmoy

- Purno Doirgho Prem Kahini
- Made in Chittagong (2022)
- Maa

== Television ==
- Mehman (2021)
