= Al Faruq Abdul Latif =

Bangladeshi politician

Member of Parliament
- Incumbent
- Assumed office 17 February 2026
- Preceded by: Asaduzzaman Noor
- Constituency: Nilphamari-2

Personal details
- Born: September 1, 1970 (age 55) Nilphamari, East Pakistan now Bangladesh
- Party: Bangladesh Jamaat-e-Islami
- Occupation: Politician

Al Faruq Abdul Latif is a politician of Bangladesh Jamaat-e-Islami and incumbent MP from Nilphamari-2.
