= Desh TV =

Bangladeshi TV channel

Desh TV দেশ টিভি
- Logo of Desh TV, used from March 2026
- Country: Bangladesh
- Broadcast area: Nationwide
- Headquarters: Malibagh, Dhaka

Programming
- Language: Bengali

Ownership
- Owner: Karnaphuli Group
- Key people: Saber Hossain Chowdhury (Chairman)

History
- Launched: 26 March 2009; 17 years ago

Links
- Website: desh.tv

Desh TV (Bengali: দেশ টিভি; lit. 'country TV'), stylized as desh.tv, is a Bangladeshi Bengali-language satellite and cable television channel owned by Desh Television Limited, a part of the Karnaphuli Group conglomerate. It officially commenced broadcasts on 26 March 2009. Desh TV is headquartered in Malibagh, Dhaka. The channel is broadcast via the Bangladesh Satellite-1.

== History ==
Former logo of Desh TV, used from 2009 to 2022

In mid to late 2000s, the Bangladesh Telecommunication Regulatory Commission granted Desh TV a license to broadcast. The channel was launched on 26 March 2009 via the Telstar 10 satellite by veteran actor and politician Asaduzzaman Noor, who is the former managing director of the channel. Desh TV aims to focus on enriching the country's culture, values, and communal harmony, which would strengthen democracy, according to Noor. Later, Bangladesh's national anthem, sung at the foot of the Shikha Chironton, was broadcast.

On 25 June 2010, marking the first death anniversary of American singer Michael Jackson, Desh TV aired a special program dedicated to him titled Tribute to the Legend: Michael Jackson. In July 2011, Desh TV premiered Ke Hotey Chay Kotipoti, the Bangladeshi adaptation of the international game show Who Wants to Be a Millionaire?, hosted by Asaduzzaman Noor. The series started with the appearance of veteran Bangladeshi actor Shakib Khan and his ex-wife Apu Biswas. In November 2011, Desh TV, along with three other Bangladeshi television channels, signed an agreement with UNICEF to air children's programming for one minute.

The channel began broadcasting on Sky in the United Kingdom on 27 April 2011 but was later removed for unknown reasons on 12 January 2012. On 2 June 2012, Desh TV launched its website. In December 2013, Desh TV aired a special 12-episode miniseries titled Deshe Deshe Juddhaporadh, regarding war crimes committed around the world. On the occasion of the month of Ramadan, Desh TV was one of the eight television channels to broadcast the cooking series Pran Premium Ghee Star Cook in July 2014. Desh TV was one of the nine Bangladeshi television channels to sign an agreement with Bdnews24.com to subscribe to a video-based news agency run by children called Prism in May 2016.

Logo of Desh TV from 2022 to 2026

On 18 October 2019, marking the first death anniversary of guitarist and singer Ayub Bachchu, Desh TV aired Sei Tumi, a special program dedicated to him. On 3 March 2022, Desh TV signed an agreement with local telecommunications company Banglalink. Under the agreement, the channel will enjoy Banglalink corporate connection as a valued client, according to a press release. Desh TV announced in July 2022 that Asaduzzaman Noor quit the channel. The channel officially adopted a new logo on 26 October 2022, changing the stylization to "DESH^{TV}". The foundation stone of the construction of Desh Tower, a new 26-floor building which would be housing Desh TV, was laid on 17 December 2023.

On 26 March 2026, coincinding their 17th anniversary, Desh TV commenced high-definition broadcasts and introduced a new logo, with the Bengali "দেশ" wordmark and the "desh.tv" stylization being brought back.

== Programming ==
Desh TV offers a diverse range of programming, including news, entertainment, and sports. It also strongly upholds the culture of Bangladesh. On its thirteenth anniversary on 26 March 2022, the channel announced that it would completely shift to airing news programming, by removing all non-news programs.

=== List of programming ===
- Bakorkhani
- Baranday Roddur
- Bela Obela Sarabela
- Call-er Gaan
- Calling Bell
- Cornet
- Desh Janapad
- Desh Shongbad
- Durpath
- Gaan Ar Gaan
- Jao Pakhi
- Jimmi
- Ke Hotey Chay Kotipoti
- Kolpoloker Golpokotha
- Radio Chocolate
- Radio Chocolate Reloaded
- Sangskriti Saradesh
- Satkahon
- Shimanto
- Shubhro
- Soja Kotha
- Sur Ar Gaan
- Tribute to the Legend
- Total Sports

== See also ==
- List of television stations in Bangladesh
