= Malay Bhowmick =

Bangladeshi playwright, actor, director, and educationist

- মলয় ভৌমিক
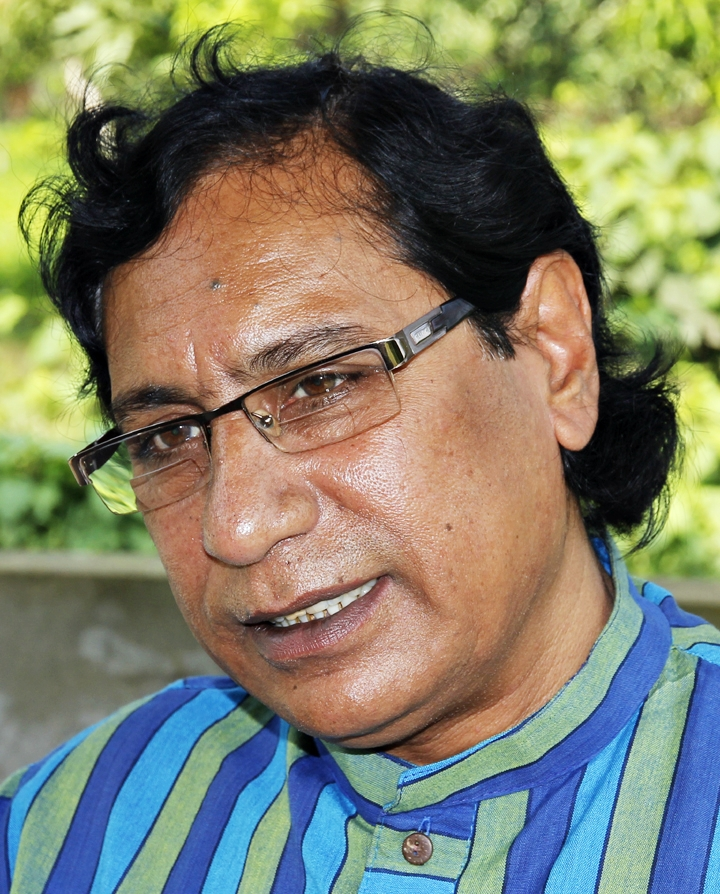
- Bhowmick in 2013
- Born: 1 May 1956 (age 69); Sirajganj, Bangladesh
- Occupation: Teaching
- Known for: Playwright, director, and educationist

Malay Bhowmick (born 1 May 1956) is a Bangladeshi playwright, actor, director, and educationist.

Bhowmick has a broad role to play in the movement of pedestrians, especially in the open play movement in the northern region of Bangladesh. Although professor of the Management Studies Department of Rajshahi University, he is better known as a playwright. Bhowmick has also served as chairperson of the Department of Theater and Music at Rajshahi. He is the recipient of Bangla Academy Literary Award (2017) and Shilpakala Padak (2020).

== Birth and family life ==
Malay Bhowmick was born on 1 May 1956 in a village of Kansona, Ullahpara, Sirajganj district, Bangladesh. His father, Shibendra Nath Bhowmick, was a respected college principal and his mother- Niyoti Bhowmick- was a homemaker. Malay Bhowmick is the third sibling of three brothers and three sisters. In 1983, Malay Bhowmick tied knots with Swapna Banerjee, headmistress of a school. Together they have a daughter: Barnana Bhowmick. She is currently serving as a lecturer in the Department of Mass Communication and Journalism at Jagannath University.

== Education ==
Malay Bhowmick earned his M.Com.(Masters of Commerce) degree in management studies from the University of Rajshahi in 1978.

== Career ==
Malay Bhowmick commenced his career as a university professor in 1982 at the Department of Management Studies at the University of Rajshahi. From the year 2003–2006, he served as the Chairperson of the same department. He was also the Chairperson of the Department of Theatre and Music from 2009 to 2011. Since his childhood, Malay Bhowmick is passionate about performing arts and engrossed himself in creative activities. For many years, Bhowmick has been a theatre personality.

From 1977 to 1999, Bhowmick worked as a journalist at the Daily Sangbad- a notable newspaper of the country. In the nineties, Malay Bhowmick wrote columns for the Daily Sangbad under the pen name Uttarer Ulukhagra. He is now a well-known columnist for Prothom Alo and for the Daily Jugantor.

For the next 7 years (1984-1993), he served as the convener of this alliance. From 1985 to 1991, he was a member of the Secretarial Committee of the National Committee of the Mukto Natok (Open Drama). Malay Bhowmick has been elected a member of the Presidium member of the Bangladesh Group Theater Federation numerous times. He is one of the executive members of the International Theater Institute (Bangladesh Centre). Since 2010, he has been a member of the Central Council of Bangladesh Shilpakala Academy.

He is also a member of the academic council of the University of Rajshahi and Jahangirnagar University. From 2000 to 2002, Bhowmick was a member of the board of governors of Bangladesh Open University. Not only did he receive advanced training in theatre, journalism, and education but also conducted several workshops and seminars on them to share his knowledge.

Malay Bhowmick is one of the founders of the theatre group named Anushilan Natyadal which was established in 1979. He is also a member of the board of directors of the Institute of Culture and Theater for Development.

== Theatre ==
Malay Bhowmick has acted in over 35 plays hitherto. From 1977 to 1980, Bhowmick was a regular actor at Bangladesh Betar, Rajshahi. He has worked as a playwright on BTV and various other private televisions. Among the TV dramas, Malay Bhowmick can be spotted in 'Aat Prohorer Golpo', 'Sundori' (serial drama), and 'Bishwas'. In contribution to theatre in Bangladesh is unparalleled. He has written 27 plays (basic in character) and has directed 37 plays.

=== Plays (written) ===
1. Bhnui (ভুঁই)
2. Goru (গরু)
3. Shatagronthi (শতগ্রন্থি)
4. Protipaksha (প্রতিপক্ষ)
5. Bibi Alir Vote (বিবি আলীর ভোট)
6. Shabbabochhed (শবব্যবচ্ছেদ)
7. Chowrasta (চৌরাস্তা)
8. Bahe Prantojan (বহে প্রান্তজন)
9. Daidayitto (দায়দায়িত্ব)
10. Bhavmurti (ভাবমূর্তি)
11. Sunagoriker Sandhane (সুনাগরিকের সন্ধানে)
12. Tunn (তূণ, যৌথ রচনা)
13. Gher (ঘের)
14. Sangcromon (সংক্রমণ)
15. Bhumikonya (ভুমিকন্যা)
16. Hotyar Shilpokala (হত্যার শিল্পকলা)
17. Uttarkhona (উত্তরখনা)
18. Dondo (দণ্ড)
19. Jagoraner Pala (জাগরণের পালা)
20. Durjan Barjan (দুর্জন বর্জন)
21. Bokboki Begum (বকবকি বেগম)
22. Ami Rana Bhai Bolchhi (আমি রানা ভাই বলছি)
23. Interghat (ইন্টারঘ্যাঁট)
24. Enternet (এন্তারনেট)
25. Mawsangketton (ম্যাওসংকেত্তন)
26. Buderamer Kupe Para (বুদেরামের কূপে পড়া)
27. Nayak O Khalnayak (নায়ক ও খলনায়ক)

=== Plays (directed) ===
1. Sat Manusher Khnoje (সৎ মানুষের খোঁজে)
2. Rajjotok (রাজযোটক)
3. Ayna (আয়না)
4. Ora Kadam Ali (ওরা কদম আলী)
5. Jodi Amra Sobai (যদি আমরা সবাই)
6. Khapa Paglar Panchal (ক্ষ্যাপা পাগলার প্যাঁচাল)
7. Iblish (ইবলিস)
8. Basan (বাসন)
9. Bhnui (ভুঁই)
10. Hattomalar Opare (হট্টমালার ওপারে)
11. Shabdorshon (শবদর্শন)
12. Satya Vuter Gappo (সত্যি ভূতের গপ্প)
13. Drabyagun (দ্রব্যগুণ)
14. New Royel Kichha (নিউ রয়েল কিসসা)
15. Pawnaganda (পাওনাগন্ডা)
16. Chokhe Aungul Dada (চোখে আঙুল দাদা)
17. Kinu Kaharer Thetar (কিনু কাহারের থেটার)
18. Hothobondh (হঠবনধ)
19. Bibi Alir Vote (বিবি আলীর ভোট)
20. Shabbabochhed (শবব্যবচ্ছেদ)
21. Dewan Gazir Kichha (দেওয়ান গাজীর কিসসা)
22. Galpo Hekim Saheb (গল্প হেকিম সাহেব)
23. Daidayitto (দায়দায়িত্ব)
24. Bhavmurti (ভাবমূর্তি)
25. Sunagoriker Sandhane (সুনাগরিকের সন্ধানে)
26. Bhumikonya (ভুমিকন্যা)
27. Jonum (জনুম, Santali drama)
28. Rather Roshi (রথের রশি)
29. Uttarkhona (উত্তরখনা)
30. Dando (দণ্ড)
31. Jagoroner Pala (জাগরণের পালা)
32. Durjan Barjan (দুর্জন বর্জন)
33. Interghat (ইন্টারঘ্যাঁট)
34. Enternet (এন্তারনেট)
35. Mawsangketton (ম্যাওসংকেত্তন)
36. Buderamer Kupe Para (বুদেরামের কূপে পড়া)
37. Nayak O Khalnayak (নায়ক ও খলনায়ক)

== Publications ==
The Oitijja Publisher collected 12 basic plays by Malay Bhowmick and published them as a book titled ‘Malay Bhowmicker Natyasongroho’. On top of that, his research articles, essays, columns and other creative writings have been published in various local and foreign newspapers and journals.

== Role in the Liberation War ==
Malay Bhowmick is a valiant freedom fighter. In 1971, at the age of 15, Malay Bhowmick, a fierce teenager, left his home to fight for the liberation war of Bangladesh. He fought under Sector 7.

== Role of Democratic Movement ==
In addition to his active participation in the Mass Revolt in 1969 and the liberation war in 1971, Bhowmick had an undeniable role in the mass movements against autocracy in 1990 and 1996.

In 1993, when cultural activities were banned at the University of Rajshahi, Malay Bhowmick did not hesitate to protest. This then subjected him to torture by the police. In 1996, under the dynamic leadership of Bhowmick, Anushilan Nattadal, Udichi Rajshahi Zila Sangsad and Rajshahi Theatre jointly formed ‘Janatar Moncho’. The satirical script he wrote to recognize the manipulative election of the government of the time, was enacted at this very stage.

On 24 August 2007, Malay Bhowmick protested against the government's anti-human rights activities. As a repercussion of this protest, special forces of the Army backed up by the caretaker government arrested him along with few other teachers of Rajshahi and Dhaka University. Upon remanding him, they tortured him and sent him to jail. In the face of intense mobilization, the then caretaker government was forced to release him from jail on 25 December 2007; he was later proven innocent by the court. He has also played a significant role in the construction of Teachers Students Cultural Centre (TSCC) and opening of Theatre and Music Department of Rajshahi University.

== Awards and honors ==
Malay Bhowmick has been awarded the Bangla Academy Award in 2017 for his contribution to Bengali literature. In 2020, he was awarded for the 'Shilpakala Padak', provided by Bangladesh Shilpakala Academy. He was also awarded the ‘Medal of Drama Activist’ by Lok Natyadal, Dhaka in 1992. Other recognitions include the ‘Munir Chowdhury Award’ in 2008, the ‘Aranyak Dipu Smriti Padak’ in 2009 by the Aranyak Natyadal and 'Akshay Kumar Maitreya Honors' in 2021. In 2023, he received the 'Shaheed Mir Quayyum Bir MuktiJoddha Award-2023', bestowed upon him by the authorities of Shahid Mir Abdul Quayyum International Dormitory, University of Rajshahi.

He addresses the audience as a guest speaker at the ‘World Theater Day’ organized in coordination of the International Theater Institute Bangladesh Center and Bangladesh Group Theater Federation on 25 March 2008. His drama ‘Uttarkhona’ is now included in the syllabus of the Theatre Department at Rabindra Bharati University, India.
