= Md. Shamsuddoha =

Bangladeshi politician

Member of Bangladesh Parliament
- In office 1991–1996
- Preceded by: Dewan Nurunnabi
- Succeeded by: Ahsan Ahmed

Personal details
- Party: Communist Party of Bangladesh

Md. Shamsuddoha is a Communist Party of Bangladesh politician and a former member of parliament for Nilphamari-2.

== Career ==
Shamsuddoha was elected to parliament from Nilphamari-2 as a Communist Party of Bangladesh candidate in 1991.
