= Ayomoy =

Bangladeshi serial

- Also known as: Oyomoi
- অয়োময়
- Genre: Drama
- Based on: Oyomoi by Humayun Ahmed
- Written by: Humayun Ahmed
- Directed by: Nawazish Ali Khan
- Starring: Asaduzzaman Noor; Abul Hayat; Abul Khair; Dilara Zaman; Enamul Haque; Sara Zaker; Lucky Enam; Bipasha Hayat; Subarna Mustafa; Afzal Sharif; Mozammel Hossain; KS Firoz; Tarana Halim
- Country of origin: Bangladesh
- Original language: Bengali
- No. of seasons: 1
- No. of episodes: 24

Production
- Producer: Nawazish Ali Khan

Original release
- Network: Bangladesh Television
- Release: 1990 – 1991

Ayomoi (Bengali: অয়োময়, The man who would not die) was a popular Bangladeshi television serial, written by Humayun Ahmed and directed by Nawazish Ali Khan, originally aired on Bangladesh Television in 1990–91. Blending fact with fiction and set in the period of British Raj, the story centres on a declining Bangla Jomidar (landlord) family.

== Cast ==
- Asaduzzaman Noor as Choto Mirza
- Abul Hayat
- Abul Khair
- Dilara Zaman
- Enamul Haque
- Saleh Ahmed
- Sara Zaker as Elachi Begum
- Lucky Enam
- Bipasha Hayat
- Suborna Mustafa
- Afzal Sharif
- Mozammel Hossain
- KS Firoz
- Tarana Halim
