= Ei Shob Din Ratri =

- Also known as: Eisob Dinratri
- এইসব দিনরাত্রি
- Genre: Drama
- Based on: Eisob Dinratri by Humayun Ahmed
- Written by: Humayun Ahmed
- Directed by: Mostafizur Rahman
- Starring: Khaled Khan; Dilara Zaman; Kazi Mehfuzul Haque; Shilpi Sarkar Apu; Asaduzzaman Noor; Lutfun Nahar Lata; Nayar Sultana Lopa; Dolly Johur; Bulbul Ahmed
- Country of origin: Bangladesh
- Original language: Bengali
- No. of seasons: 1
- No. of episodes: 21

Production
- Production location: Dhaka
- Running time: 60 minutes (average)

Original release
- Network: BTV
- Release: 1985

Eisob Dinratri (English: All These Days and Nights) is a 1985 Bangla family-drama written by Humayun Ahmed. It aired on BTV.

== Synopsis ==
The drama tells the story of a middle-class joint family living in the capital city Dhaka. It depicts a middle class Bangladeshi family's day-to-day life, including love, marriage, death and other issues. The story ends with the death of a young girl called Tuni due to Hodgkin disease. Viewers had demanded that its creator Humayun Ahmed save the character, but Ahmed refused to change his original story. Humayun Ahmed allegedly wrote the story to raise enough money to buy a television which was expensive back then. He stopped writing the story once his original goal had been fulfilled which later drew criticism from the actors and actresses involved in the show.

== Cast ==
- Kazi Mehfuzul Haque as father
- Dilara Zaman as mother
- Bulbul Ahmed as Shafique
- Dolly Johur as Neelu
- Asaduzzaman Noor as Rafique
- Lutfun Nahar Lata as Sharmin
- Khaled Khan as Anis
- Shilpi Sarkar Apu as Shahana
- Nayar Sultana Lopa as Tuni
- Abul Khair as Kabir Mama
- Masud Ali Khan as Neelu's boss
- Enamul Haque as Mr. Karim, Neelu's colleague
- Abul Hayat as Dulabhai
- Raisul Islam Asad as Jahir, Shahana's husband
- Suja Khondokar as Sadek Ali
- Jamaluddin Hossain as Sharmin's father

Guest appearances

- Jewel Aich as himself
