= Lutfun Nahar Lata =

Bangladeshi actress and director

- লুৎফুন নাহার লতা
- Born: Bangladesh
- Other name: Lota
- Citizenship: Bangladeshi
- Occupations: Actress; director
- Years active: 1985-1997, 2016-present
- Known for: Ei Shob Din Ratri (1985) Bohubrihi (1988 – 1989)
- Spouses: Nasir Uddin (before 1997); Marc Weinberg (m. 2014)

Lutfun Nahar Lata or Lota (a.k.a. Lata Nasiruddin) is a Bangladeshi actress and director, known for Ei Shob Din Ratri (1985), Eka Eka (1985), and Bohubrihi (1988). She started her acting career in the late 1980s, and after she took a long break from acting in 1997.

== Biography ==
She was born in Bangladesh. In 1997 she moved to New York City, and lives there. After the separation with Major Nasir Uddin she married Marc Weinberg, a Swiss American businessman in 2014. In 2017, she published a story book named Jibon O Juddher Collage. She was president of United States Bangabandhu Sangskritik Jote. She serves in the New York City Department of Education.

== Works ==
=== Filmography ===
As actress

==== Films ====
- Ekattorer Lash (1998)

==== Television ====
Year	Title	Role	Note
1985	Eka Eka	Nishat	
1985	Ei Shob Din Ratri	Sharmin	
1987	Ditiyo Jonmo	Sharmin	
1988	Shoikote Sharosh	Zebin	
1988	Bohubrihi	Mili	
1997	Ghatona Samanno	Rumki	credited as Lata Nasiruddin

As director

- Tumi Ashbe Bole (2016)

=== Books ===
- Jibon O Juddher College (2017)
