= Nawazish Ali Khan =

Bangladeshi television producer

- নওয়াজীশ আলী খান
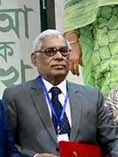
- Khan in 2023
- Occupation: Television producer
- Awards: Read full list

Nawazish Ali Khan is a television producer. His productions are Bohubrihi (1988-1989), Ayomoy (1990-1991), Jalsha (1994). He is the CEO at Global Television.

Khan won the National Award for Best Producer in 1975 and 1976 consecutively for his production of Bornali. In 2023, he won Ekushey Padak for his contributions to arts.

== Career ==
Khan studied at University of Karachi. He joined Pakistan Television in 1967. He worked there til 1972. Khan didn't get the chance to return home, even after Bangladesh earned its independence in 1971. Then, escaping from Pakistan in October 1972, he returned to Bangladesh, passing through Afghanistan and India. He joined Bangladesh Television as a producer. Eventually, he started his job with a musical programme. After that, he produced a programme titled Ratna Dwip. After completing 28 years of tenure, he retired from BTV as the general manager in 1999. He joined Ekushey Television in the same year as head of program. In 2002, after the shutdown of Ekushey Television, he joined ATN Bangla as the head of program and later advisor (program). He worked at ATN Bangla for more than 15 years. In 2019, he joined Global Television as its CEO.

Khan completed his 50 years in television media on 29 November 2017.

== Works ==
Among his notable works are Bornali, a subject-oriented hourly musical show, for which he won the National Award for Best Producer in 1976; Jalsha, which featured Bangladeshi bands; and Eid Special Program Anondomela, which has been hosted by personalities like Annisul Huq, Abed Khan, Sanjida Akhter, Abdullah Abu Sayeed and Jewel Aich, among others. Khan has also produced the first SAF games for BTV, which were planned by Mustafa Monwar.

Khan collaborated with Humayun Ahmed in multiple projects, including his first television drama, Prothom Prohor, in 1983. The duo created TV productions like Janani, Gach Manush, Kobi, Matir Pinjirae Bondi Hoia, Himu, Ojatra, Esho Nipobone, Ouija Board, Nimful and others. His works also include television shows Shoptoporna hosted by Abdullah Abu Sayeed and Jodi Kichu Mone Na Koren hosted by Fazle Lohani. Khan has also won the National Award for Best Producer in 1975 for magazine shows and other programs. His work Jononi has been recognized with a merit certificate from the United Nations, while Korean Broadcasting Network has awarded "Kaajer Gaan", an episode of Bornali, with a merit certificate.

== Awards ==
- National Award for best Television Program- Bornali (1975 and 1976)
- Sher-E-Bangla Literary Award (1992)
- Dhaka Youth Foundation Award (1995)
- Kalodhwani Independence Gold Medal (1995)
- National Personality Award (1995)
- TDF Lifetime Achievement Award (2004)
- A-1 Telemedia and Silk Line Independence Award (2005)
- Bijoy Barta Shommanona Award (2017)
- Ekushey Padak (2023)
