= Nilphamari-2 =

Constituency of Bangladesh's Jatiya Sangsad

Coordinates: 25.93°N 88.86°E

- Constituency for the Jatiya Sangsad
- District: Nilphamari District
- Division: Rangpur Division
- Electorate: 385,785 (2026)

Current constituency
- Created: 1984
- Party: Bangladesh Jamaat-e-Islami
- Member: Al Faruq Abdul Latif
- ← 12 Nilphamari-1 14 Nilphamari-3 →

Nilphamari-2 is a constituency represented in the Jatiya Sangsad (National Parliament) of Bangladesh since 2026 by Al Faruq Abdul Latif of the Bangladesh Jamaat-e-Islami.

== Boundaries ==
The constituency encompasses Nilphamari Sadar Upazila.

== History ==
The constituency was created in 1984 from a Rangpur constituency when the former Rangpur District was split into five districts: Nilphamari, Lalmonirhat, Rangpur, Kurigram, and Gaibandha.

== Members of Parliament ==
Election	Member	Party
1986	Dewan Nurunnabi	Jatiya Party
1991	Md. Shamsuddoha	Communist Party of Bangladesh
Feb 1996	Dewan Nurunnabi	Bangladesh Nationalist Party
Jun 1996	Ahsan Ahmed	Jatiya Party
2001	Asaduzzaman Noor	Awami League
2008	Asaduzzaman Noor	Awami League
2014	Asaduzzaman Noor	Awami League
2018	Asaduzzaman Noor	Awami League
2024	Asaduzzaman Noor	Awami League
2026	Al Faruq Abdul Latif	Bangladesh Jamaat-e-Islami

== Elections ==
=== Elections in the 2020s ===
General election 2026: Nilphamari-2
Party	Candidate	Votes	%	±%
Jamaat	Al Faruq Abdul Latif			
BNP	Shahrin Islam Tuhin			
Majority				
Turnout				
Registered electors		385,785		
Jamaat gain from AL				

General Election 2024: Nilphamari-2
Party	Candidate	Votes	%	±%
AL	Asaduzzaman Noor			
Independent	Md. Zainal Abidin			
JP(E)	Md. Shahjahan Ali Choudhury			

=== Elections in the 2010s ===
General Election 2018: Nilphamari-2
Party	Candidate	Votes	%	±%
AL	Asaduzzaman Noor	178,030	67.9	+6.3
BNP	Moniruzzaman Montu	80,283	30.6	−6.8
IAB	Md Jahurul Islam	3,808	1.5	+0.5
Majority		97,747	37.3	+13.1
Turnout		262,121	84.1	−6.6
Registered electors		311,735		
AL hold				

Asaduzzaman Noor was re-elected unopposed in the 2014 general election after opposition parties withdrew their candidacies in a boycott of the election.

=== Elections in the 2000s ===
General Election 2008: Nilphamari-2
Party	Candidate	Votes	%	±%
AL	Asaduzzaman Noor	135,626	61.6	+23.5
Jamaat	Moniruzzaman Montu	82,324	37.4	+1.5
IAB	Mohammad Ali Paramanik	2,198	1.0	N/A
Majority		53,302	24.2	+22.0
Turnout		220,148	90.7	+7.3
AL hold				

General Election 2001: Nilphamari-2
Party	Candidate	Votes	%	±%
AL	Asaduzzaman Noor	69,960	38.1	+5.1
Jamaat	Abdul Latif	65,835	35.9	+12.0
IJOF	Joynal Abedin	41,227	22.5	N/A
Jatiya Party (M)	Ahsan Ahmed	5,806	3.2	N/A
Independent	Mosa. Monsura Begum	467	0.3	N/A
KSJL	Md. Ataur Rahman	282	0.2	N/A
Majority		4,125	2.2	−1.9
Turnout		183,577	83.4	+6.4
AL gain from JP(E)				

=== Elections in the 1990s ===
General Election June 1996: Nilphamari-2
Party	Candidate	Votes	%	±%
JP(E)	Ahsan Ahmed	44,999	33.3	+9.4
AL	Joynal Abedin	44,560	33.0	N/A
Jamaat	Abdul Latif	32,278	23.9	−4.8
BNP	Dewan Nurunnabi	11,615	8.6	−3.8
IOJ	Md. Abdus Sattar	959	0.7	N/A
Jatiya Biplobi Front	A. K. M. Jakaria Shekh	631	0.5	N/A
Majority		439	0.3	−4.5
Turnout		135,042	77.0	+14.1
JP(E) gain from BNP				

General Election 1991: Nilphamari-2
Party	Candidate	Votes	%	±%
CPB	Md. Shamsuddoha	35,216	33.5	
Jamaat	Abdul Latif	30,154	28.7	
JP(E)	Dewan Nurunnabi	25,125	23.9	
BNP	Ahsan Ahmed	13,013	12.4	
Jatiya Samajtantrik Dal-JSD	Md. Aminul Islam	629	0.6	
Zaker Party	Md. Fazlul Haq	474	0.5	
NDP	Sayed Md. Ismail	168	0.2	
Independent	Kazi Aminul Haq	166	0.2	
Bangladesh Muslim League (Kader)	Kazi Ashfaq Hossain	153	0.1	
Majority		5,062	4.8	
Turnout		105,098	62.9	
CPB gain from JP(E)				
