= Bengal Repertory =

Indian theater group

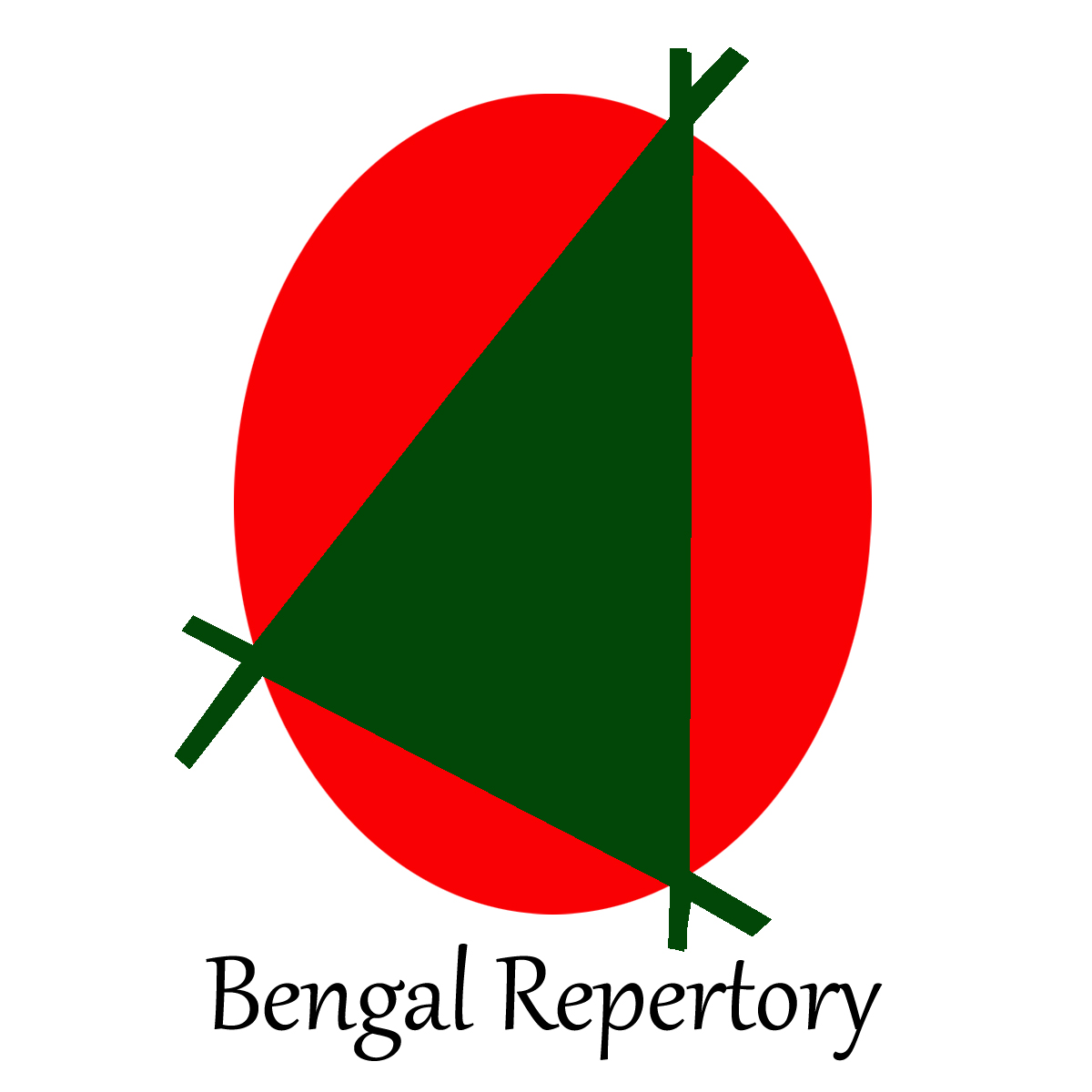
- Formation: 2008
- Type: Theatre group
- Location: Kolkata, West Bengal, India
- Artistic director: Rik Amrit
- Website: www.bengalrepertory.org

Bengal Repertory is a Bengali theater group from Kolkata, West Bengal. The group is famous for its destination theatre festival 'Natya Dhara' in India.

== Major productions ==
Until April, 2020 Bengal Repertory has staged several full-length plays. Some of those are:

- Vasana
- Manan
- Katha-Karnabhar
- Aradhika
- Ashwatthama-the war machine
- Krishna the man alone
- Advut Andhar Ek
- Megh Malhar

== Theatre Festival: Natya Dhara ==
Bengal Repertory's Natya Dhara is a theatre festival, which is the first ever destination theatre festival in West Bengal, India.
