= Ahsan Ahmed =

Bangladeshi Politician

Member of Parliament for Nilphamari-2
- In office 14 July 1996 – 13 July 2001
- Preceded by: Md. Shamsuddoha
- Succeeded by: Asaduzzaman Noor

Personal details
- Died: 24 February 2017 (aged 83) Dhaka, Bangladesh
- Party: Bangladesh Nationalist Party

Ahsan Ahmed (died on 24 February 2017) was a Bangladesh Nationalist Party politician and a Jatiya Sangsad member representing the Nilphamari-2 constituency.

== Career ==
Ahmed was elected to parliament from Nilphamari-2 as a Jatiya Party candidate in 1996. He was elected mayor of Nilphamari Municipality four times. He was the founding president of the Nilphamari District unit of the Bangladesh Nationalist Party. He contested the 1991 parliamentary election as a candidate from Bangladesh Nationalist Party-BNP and lost. He also contested the national parliamentary election as a candidate from NAP ( Vasani) in Bangladesh's first parliament election in 1973 and lost that race as well.

== Death ==
Ahmed died on 24 February 2017 in Eden Multicare Hospital, Dhaka, Bangladesh.
