= Asaduzzaman Noor =

Bangladeshi actor and politician

- আসাদুজ্জামান নূর
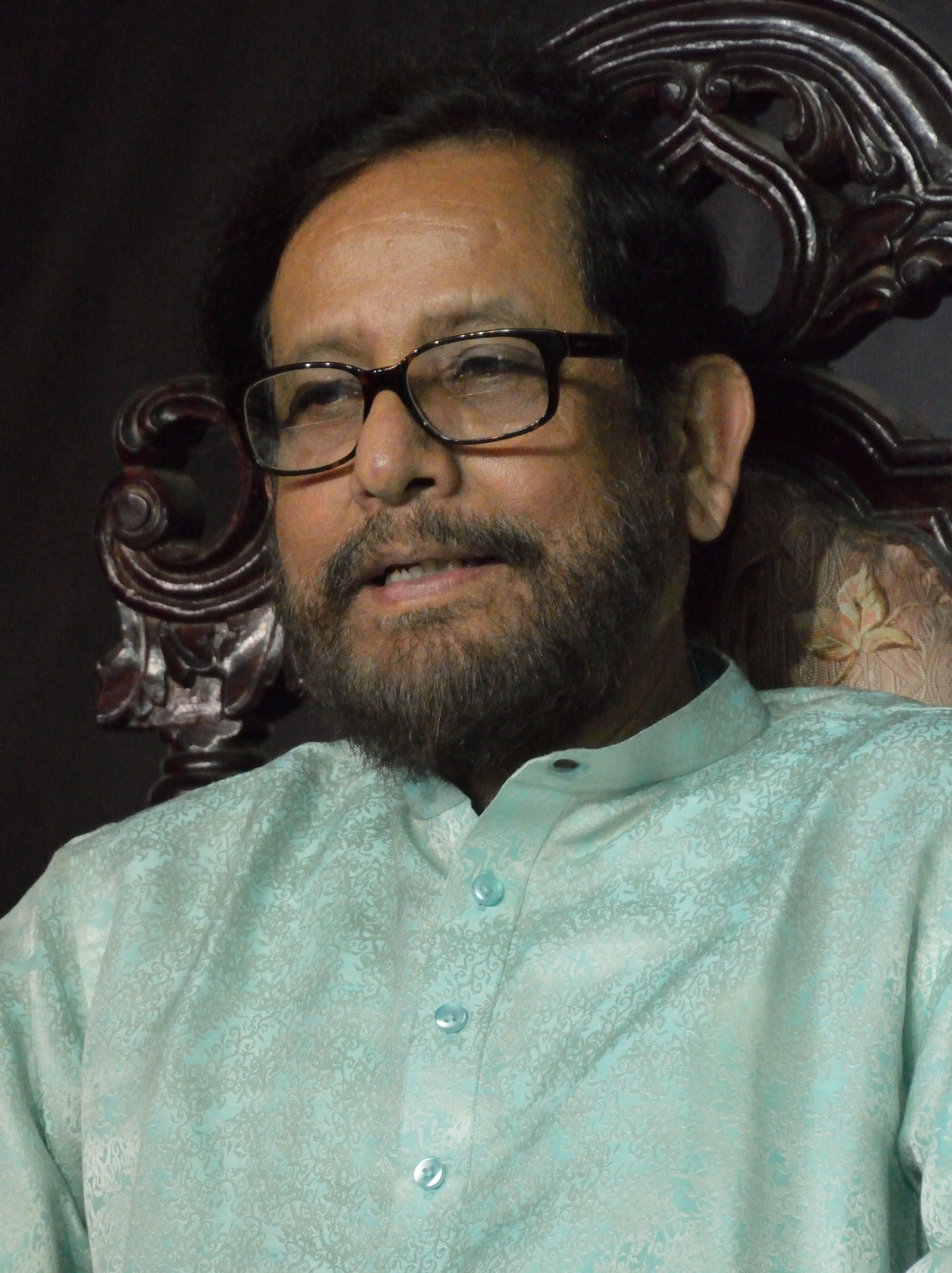
- Noor in Kolkata in 2016

Member of the Bangladesh Parliament for Nilphamari-2
- In office 10 October 2001 – 6 August 2024
- Preceded by: Ahsan Ahmed
- Succeeded by: Al Faruq Abdul Latif

Minister of Cultural Affairs
- In office 13 January 2014 – 7 January 2019
- Prime Minister: Sheikh Hasina
- Preceded by: Hasanul Haq Inu
- Succeeded by: K. M. Khalid

Personal details
- Born: 31 October 1946 (age 79) Jalpaiguri, Bengal Province, British India
- Party: Bangladesh Awami League
- Spouse: Shaheen Akhter
- Education: University of Dhaka
- Occupation: Actor, cultural activist, politician, reciter

Asaduzzaman Noor (born 31 October 1946) is a Bangladeshi actor, politician and activist. He was a Jatiya Sangsad member representing the Nilphamari-2 constituency during 2001–2024 and served as the cultural affairs minister during 2014–2019.

Noor worked as an actor in theatre, film and television productions. He is best known for his role as Baker Bhai in the television series Kothao Keu Nei. His other notable television works include Ei Shob Din Ratri, Aaj Robibar, Ayomoy, Bohubrihi and Nokkhotrer Raat. His notable films are Shonkhonil Karagar (1992) and Aguner Poroshmoni (1994).

In 2018, Noor was awarded the Independence Day Award, the highest civilian state award in Bangladesh, by the government of Bangladesh.

== Early life and education ==
Noor was born in Jalpaiguri in West Bengal (now in India) on 31 October 1946 to Abu Nazem Mohammad Ali and Amina. His family migrated to Nilphamari District in East Bengal (now in Bangladesh) in 1948. Both of his parents worked as school teachers. He studied at Nilphamari College, Carmichael College and the University of Dhaka.

== Career ==
=== Acting ===
Noor's acting career began with the theatre. In 1973, he joined the theatre group "Nagorik". He was a receptionist of the paper "Chitraly" at that time and went to take the interview of the prominent actors that time. There he met Aly Zaker, an actor of Nagorik, who asked him to visit the rehearsal of his new team. Later he joined that group. At first, he used to work behind the stage as a prompter. At one point the rehearsal of the drama Toilo Shonkot, which was written by Rashid Haider, was going on when, with only two days remaining until performance day, the leading actor of that drama, Abul Hayat, got injured. As Noor had learned all the lines in his role as a prompter, Zaker asked Noor to take the part. Following a bit of persuasion from the other cast, Noor performed the role, and thus began his career as an actor. Noor's first television drama, Rang-er Phanush, was directed by Abdullah al Mamun in 1974.

Noor got his break-through in acting during his early days as a Bangladesh Television dramatic artist and has since starred in many television shows and films.

In 2018, Noor returned to the stage with his long-term acting partner, Zaker, in a Bengali adaptation of Bertolt Brecht's play, The Life of Galileo, about the 17th-century polymath Galileo Galilei. The role of Galileo was played by Zaker, with Noor playing a number of supporting roles. The play ran for a limited number of performances in Dhaka's Bailey Road.

=== Politics ===
Noor came to politics during the period of Ayub Khan in 1962. He was a student and had joined the East Pakistan Students' Union, which was a left-sided organisation. Later he became the chairman of the Nilfamari Mohokuma Shomeetee. In 1966, he was admitted to Dhaka University to study law, where he met Natyaguru Nurul Momen as his teacher. He was still a member of the Students' Union. Later he became the cultural secretary of the central committee. He also was the chairman of the Shongskriti Shongshod, a very large cultural organisation of Dhaka University. Noor stayed in the Iqbal Hall (now Johurul Huq Hall) which was the centre of student politics during that period. At that time Noor came in contact with the versatile student leaders of that time. Though the followers of different political belief they worked together against the dictatorship of West Pakistan government.

At the eve of the Bangladesh Liberation War, Noor left Dhaka and came back to Nilphamari District when he received an order from his political party on 8 March 1971. There he helped the then East Pakistan Rifles (now Border Guards Bangladesh). He crossed the border during the War of Liberation on 8 April. Noor was a freedom fighter under the Sector-6 and helped to organise the war and took training. He also helped to recruit freedom fighters during the nine-month war period. But following the liberation of Bangladesh, he grew more distant from active politics. However, later Noor became active in the 1990 Mass Uprising against the military leader Ershad.

In 1996, Noor was asked by the Bangladesh Awami League leader and future prime minister, Sheikh Hasina, to run as an Awami League candidate in the upcoming parliamentary election. However, claiming he was not yet ready, he postponed participation until the subsequent general election in 2001, running in his home-town, Nilphamari. In the 2001 general election Noor was elected as the member of parliament for Nilphamari-2, a constituency in the north-west, where he won with 38% of the popular vote.

In the subsequent 2008 general election, Noor was re-elected, increasing his vote share to 62%. Noor ran unopposed in the 2014 general election, as the election was boycotted by the opposition alliance. He was elected for a fourth consecutive time in the 2018 general election for Nilphamari-2, with a vote share of 68%. He was elected again in the 2024 general election (which was largely boycotted by opposition parties). Noor ceased to be an MP when parliament was dissolved in August 2024, following the quota reform movement.

In 2014, Noor was appointed to the cabinet by the prime minister, Sheikh Hasina, as minister for the Ministry of Cultural Affairs. He served a full term as minister but was dropped from the subsequent cabinet formed in 2019.

On 14 December 2013, Noor's motorcade in Nilphamari was attacked by activists of Bangladesh Jamaat-e-Islami, causing the deaths of five people. Two days earlier, 70+ shops and businesses owned by the local Hindu community in his constituency, had allegedly been attacked and burnt down by Jamaat activists. Noor's convoy was returning from a visit to his constituencies there when the attack happened. According to media reports, the road had been cut up, preventing the convoy's movement, in what was described as a planned ambush, and the attackers were brandishing sharp weapons. Four of those killed were affiliated with the ruling Awami League. Noor is said to have only escaped alive because people had made a human shield around him.

On 15 September 2024, Noor was arrested from Bailey Road, Dhaka, by the detective branch for a murder case filed over the death of hotel staff, Siam Sarder, in the Mirpur area during the quota reform movement on 18 July. He was also sued in another murder case of Golam Rabbani, the organising secretary of BNP's Lakshmichap union leader, in Nilphamari in 2014.

=== Other activities ===
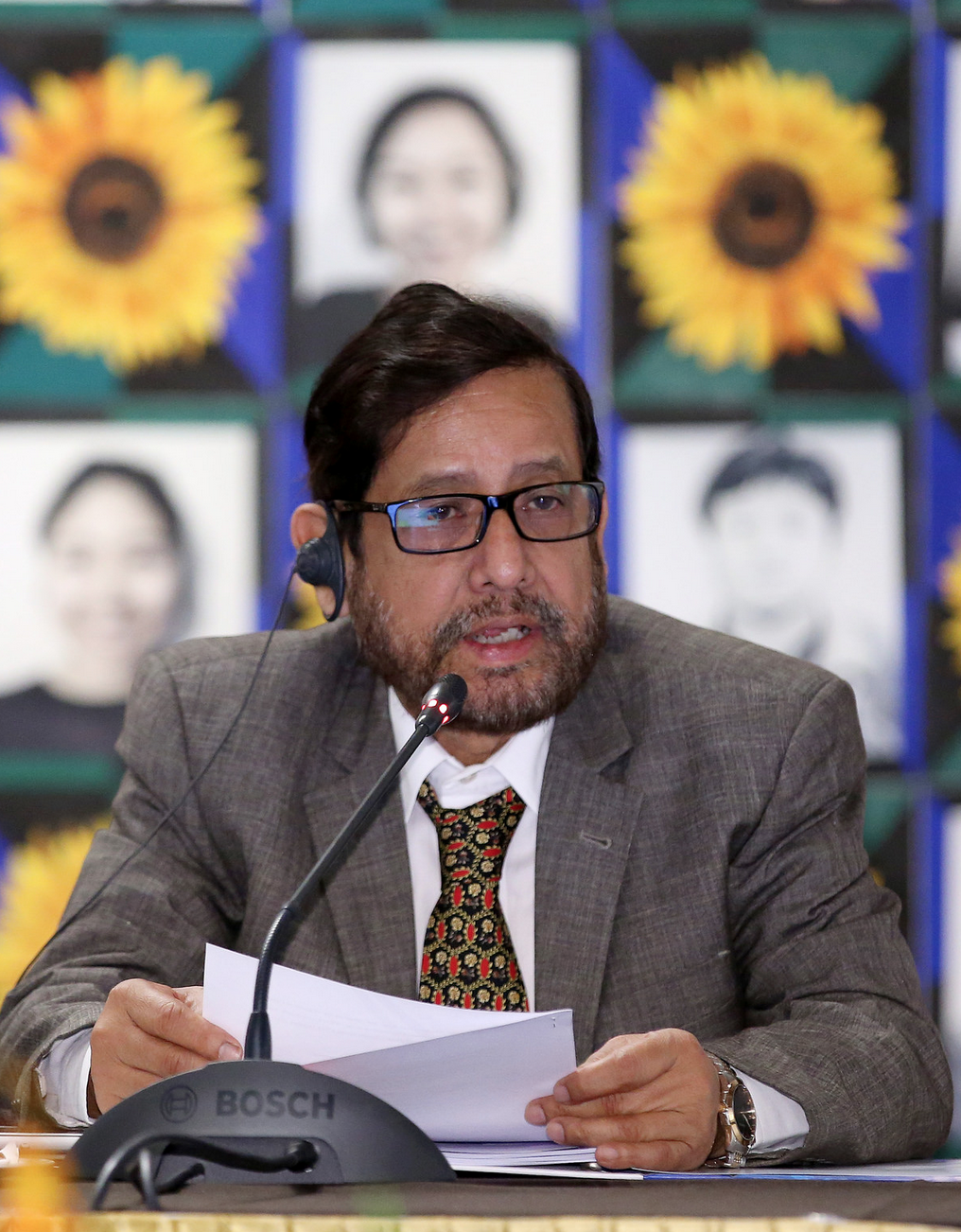
Noor in Gwangju, South Korea (2014)

Noor is an elocutionist known for his poetry and prose recitation and his oration. He has lent his voice to numerous television shows as a narrator and to advertisements.

Noor is a former vice-chairman at Asiatic Three Sixty and a former managing director at Desh TV, but resigned from these posts when assuming his role as a minister. He is also a trustee at the Bangladesh Liberation War Museum.

== Works ==
=== Television ===
- Ei Shob Din Ratri (1985)
- Ayomoy (1988)
- Bohubrihi (1988)
- Kothao Keu Nei (1990)
- Nokkhotrer Raat (1995)
- Priyo Podorekha (1992)
- Aaj Robibar (1999)
- Ke Hotey Chay Kotipoti (2011)
- Osthir Somoy Shostir Golpo: Hotel Albatross (2017)

=== Films ===
- Hooliya (1984)
- Shonkhonil Karagar (1992)
- Aguner Poroshmoni (1994)
- Chandrokotha (2003)
- Daruchini Dip (2007)
- Biography of Nazrul (2020), as a narrator
- Joy Banglar Dhoni† (2022)

=== Web series ===
- Unoloukik

== Awards ==
- Shahid Munier Chowdhury Award (2006)
- Syed Badruddin Hossain Memorial Award (2015)
- World Theatre Day Award (2015)
- Independence Day Award (2018)

== Personal life ==
Noor is married to Shaheen Akhter, a professor of paediatric neurology at the Institute of Postgraduate Medical Research (IPGMR) and the director of the Institute of Paediatric Neurodisorder and Autism (IPNA). Together they have a son, Shudeepto, and a daughter, Shuprova.
