= Padatik Nattya Sangsad =

Theatre group in Dhaka, Bangladesh

Padatik Natya Sangsad-Bangladesh
- Formation: 21 January 1978
- Type: Theatre group
- Location: Dhaka, Bangladesh
- Notable members: S. M. Solayman; Khan Anisuzzaman Manik; Anwarul Kamal Badal; A M Murtayish Kochi; Selim S. H. Chowdhury; Golam Kuddus; Md Kutub Uddin Jang Chowdhury
- Website: http://www.padatikbd.com

Padatik Natya Sangsad (Padatik theatre group) is a Dhaka based Bangladeshi Bengali theatre group. To sustain the spirit of the Bangladesh Liberation War, the group was formed in 1978.

== History ==
Padatik began its journey on 21 January 1978 with a core team of spirited Dhaka University students and some former theatre workers of Kalantar Natyagosthi. The primary aim of this group was to uplift spirit, enrich culture and to sustain the spirit of the Bangladesh Liberation War (1971). The first drama to be staged by this group was Jasimuddin's Sojan Bandiyar Ghat. Following members started Padatik namely S.M. Solaiman, Anisuzzaman Manik, Abul Kashem Dulal, Abu Mohammad Murtaysh Kachi, Quamrul Hassan Swapan, Ulfat Rana, Selim S H Chowdhury, Golam Quddus & others. Ist Executive committee formed with Anisuzzaman Manik as president and abul Kashem Dulal as General Secretary. In 1980 Padatik formed another branch of this theatre group in Narayanganj, Bangladesh.[4][5] The troupe has produced popular plays like “Shojon Badiar Ghat”, “Tin Rostomer Goppo”, “Monoshar Pala”, “Maa”, Chandraboti", “Shey”, “Khetmojur Khoimuddin”, “Poramati”, “Khyapa Paglar Pyachal”, “Jol Balika” & “Dinlipi (Mime)”. Padatik promote original plays based on literary classics and rich folk heritage. The founding chief SM Solaiman, who had an affinity with folk culture. The spirit of Liberation War shaped Bangladesh theatre. Padatik Sangeet Sangsad, the musical wing of Padatik, in association with Kolkata-based cultural organization Mitali, has been arranging a Rabindra Sangeet talent hunt programme since 2005. Young talents from Bangladesh, West Bengal, Assam and Tripura [of India] participate in the competition. Padatik hold the ‘Padatik Ekushey Cultural Congress’ in Dhaka since 1998 and introduced 'Kachi Smriti Padak' in 2004 in memory of its founder member Abu Mohammad Murtaysh Kachi.

== Festivals ==
- Since 1999 the theatre group organizes Padatik Ekushey Cultural Congress every year on 21 February in the occasion of International Mother Language Day.
- Since 2003, the group also celebrates Choitro Sangkranti Utsab, eve of Bangla New year every year. Artists, activists and different cultural group from Bangladesh and India join these festivals.
- Since 2004 Padatik introduce "Kachi Memorial Award" in memory of its founder member Abu Mohammad Murtaysh Kachi with Padatik Drama Festival.

== Productions ==
=== Stage plays ===
Year	Drama	Writer/Based on	Director
In alphabetical order
1982	Ballabhpurer Rupkatha	Badal Sarkar	Kamruzzaman Runu
1988	Chandrabati	Monajat Uddin and Asif Munir	Kamruzzaman Runu
1980	Chikitsa Bibhrat	Porshuram	Anisuzzaman Manik
1990	Chokkor	Wilder Thornton	Aziz
2001	Choitonney Droho	Shamim Ahsan	Sahadat Hossain Nipu
2005	Jolbalika	Masum Reza	Shamsul Alam Bokul
1978	Kabar	Jasimuddin's poem	S. M. Solayman
2003	Khetmojur Khaimuddin	Golam Sarwar	Golam Sarwar
1984	Ma	Play written by Bertolt Brecht and based on Maxim Gorky's Mother	Kamal Uddin Nilu
1980	Manasar Pala	Kazi Rafiq	Kazi Rafiq
1980	Rata-Rati	Parshuram	A. M. Murtayish Kachi
1978	Sojan Bandiyar Ghat	Jasimuddin	S. M. Solayman
2011	Shey	Rabindranath Thakur	Debashis Gose
2014	Poramati (Tale from '71)	Babul Biswas	Dr. Irin Parveen Lopa
2009	Dinlipi (Mime)	Raj	Raj
1978	Tin Rostomer Goppo	SM Solaiman	SM Solaiman
2021	Prerona	Sabil Reza Chowdhury	Sabil Reza Chowdhury

=== Street Plays ===
(in alphabetical order)

- Khepa Paglar Peychal- Director: S.M. Solyman
- Ajker Sangbad - Director: Kamaluddin Nilu
- Bhulini Ekattor
- Bishwa Behayar Porikolpana - Director: Ziillur Rahman Jhon
- Choor - Director: Kazi Rafique
- Ekhono kalo Megh
- Hollabol - Director: Ziillur Rahman Jhon
- Machine - Director: Malay Kumar Paul
- Raja Canute - Director: Bahar Uddin Khelon
- Rongbaji
- Sari Sari Lash - Director: Kazi Rafique
- Taramon Bibi - Director: Kazi Rafique
