= Litu Anam =

Bangladeshi actor

- লিটু আনাম
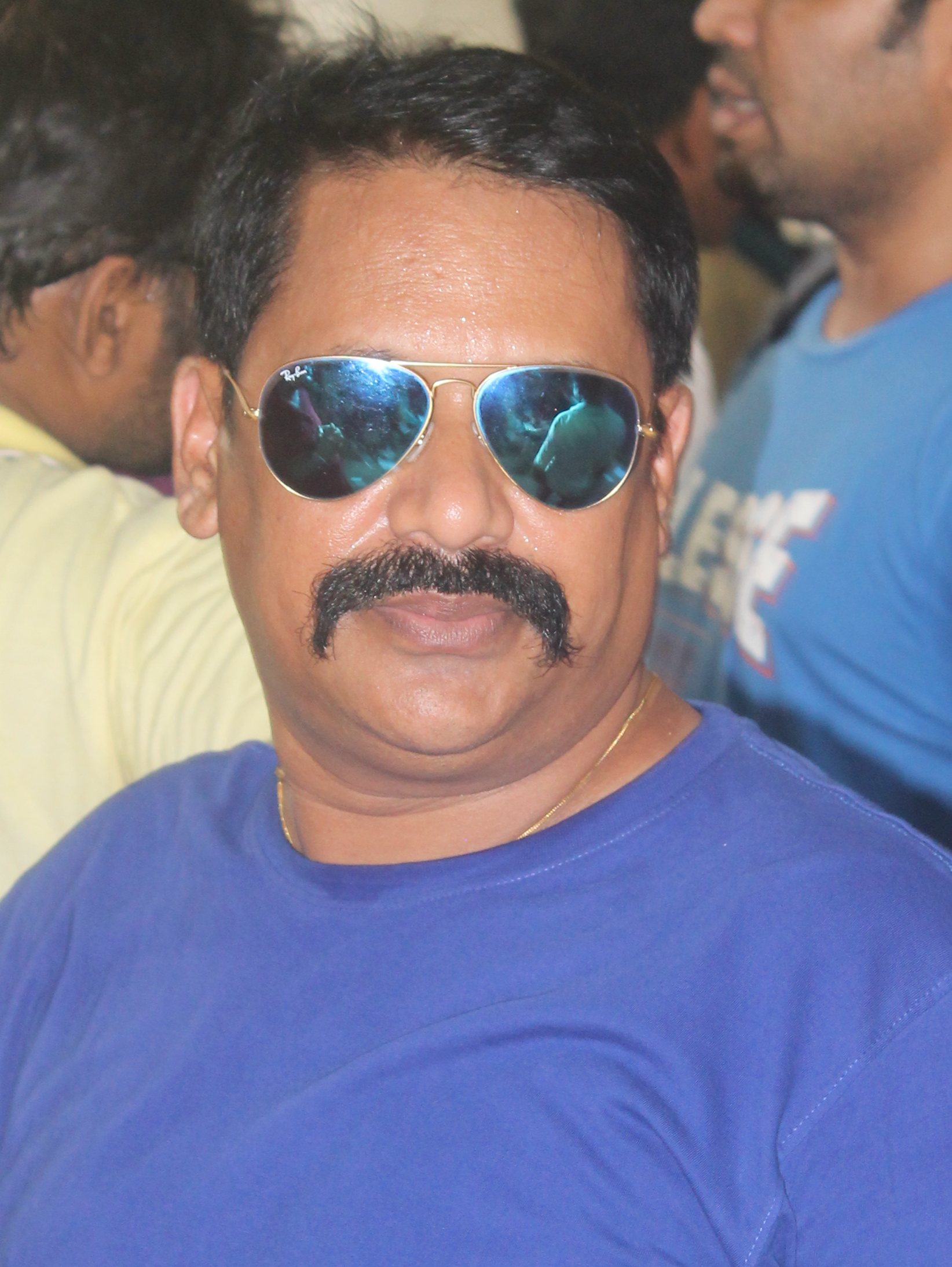
- Litu Anam, Dhaka 2018
- Born: Thakurgaon
- Occupation: Actor
- Years active: 1998–present
- Spouse: Hridi Haq
- Children: 2

Litu Anam (Bengali: লিটু আনাম) is a Bangladeshi stage, television, and film actor. He made his acting debut in the drama Dure Kothao. He has acted in about 3,500 television shows and a few films. He married Hridi Haq, the daughter of Enamul Haque and Lucky Enam.

== Early and personal life ==
Litu Anam was born on 15 June in Thakurgaon. He has an older brother, Parvez Anam. Anam married actor and director Hridi Haq, the elder daughter of actors Enamul Haque and Lucky Enam, in December 2005. On 5 December 2011, they had twins, a boy, Aniruddha Unman, and a girl, Ansuya Hridi.

== Career ==
Anam started his acting career in theater. He was a member of the Dhaka Theatre group. In 1998, he made his television debut opposite Shomi Kaiser in Dure Kothao, directed by Mohan Khan. Anam went on to appear in about 3,500 works, mostly for television, but also a few films. Because of his television workload, he rarely acted in live theater after 2001.

== Works ==
=== Television ===
- Meghdut
- Setar
- Lalghuri
- Mukhos
- Jal o Khorer Putul
- Valobasa
- Valobasi
- Godai Dactar
- Jadur Kathi
- Doirotho
- Chacha Even Company
- World Cup
- Kul Ny Kinar Ny
- Baba
- Opohoron
- Mojar Manus
- Kanamachi
- Dhong
- Chhaymukh
- Korbani Online
- Sagor Songome
- Monvasi
- Prottasa o Prapti
- Bibor
- Shekor
- Ek Je Chhilo Hati
- Je Fule Gondho Nei
- Tumi Nou
- Babuder Futani
- Jua
- Bonnyar Chokhe Jol
- Vitore Bahire
- Sit Khali Ny
- Korban Ali O Korbani
- Chokhachokhi
- Dohon
- Bogurar Sir
- Nosto Jibon
- Mayajal
- Ojana
- Atonko
- Sopno 1997
- Bijone Sujon
- Lov
- Sesh Drisswe Khoma
- Sei Sob Dingulo
- Icecream
- Horof
- 1971 & etc.
- Shopno
- Telelove
- Porinoti
- Tini Ekjon
- Dure Kothao (1998)
- Ghurni (2001)
- Moner Goheene Tumi (2003)
- Kala Golar Mala (2005)
- Megh Baloker Galpo (2005)
- Shat Jan Jatri (2005)
- Anur Bikal (2005)
- Amader Anondo Bari (2005)
- Shunnosthan Purno (2006)
- Rikter Bedon (2006)
- Mohanagar (2007)
- Shubhodrishti (2007)
- Syed Barir Bou (2008)
- Jege Theko (2008)
- Shesh Rakkha (2008)
- Protishapon (2008)
- Shomudrojol (2008)
- Ronger Duniya (2008)
- Tuntuni Villa (2008)
- Saat Samuddur (2008)
- Jakhon Bhalobasha (2009)
- 1920 (2009)
- Tomtom (2009)
- Swapne Boshobash (2009)
- Ghor-er Khobor Por-er Khobor (2009)
- Mayakanon (2009)
- Aladin-er Cheragh (2009)
- Johur Ali Johuri (2009)
- Chandmari (2009)
- Sixty-Twenty (2009)
- Monkora (2009)
- Samudra Mongal (2009)
- Niyomer Baire (2009)
- Ekta Kinle Ekta Free (2009)
- Tobuo Boshonto (2009)
- Nayok Asheyni (2009)
- Ekti Showpiece-er Kahini (2009)
- Ilu Ilu (2009)
- Barabari Hate Hari (2009)
- Jonmodin (2009)
- Rahman Monjil (2010)
- Hey Rajkonya (2010)
- Anubhumi (2010)
- Dewal (2010)
- Ikaruser Dana (2010)
- Shada Pata-e Kalo Daag (2010)
- Natra Atta Nirjantar Golpo (2010)
- Chokh (2010)
- Kagojer Nouka (2010)
- Kalbihongo (2010)
- Hridoyer Kachher Bochhor (2011)
- Cricketrongo (2011)
- Tokhon Hemonto (2011)
- Nolak (2011)
- Boiree Batash (2012)
- Jadur Shohor (2012)
- Sixth Sense (2014)
- Chokrobohu (2014)
- Bajro-Atuni (2014)
- Bashontipur (2016)
- Lady in Blue (2019)
- Roop (2019)

=== Filmography ===
- Ekattorer Jishu
- Chor o Bhogoban
- Adhiar (2003)
- Nirontor (2006)
- Nondito Noroke (2006)
- 1971 Shei Shob Din (2023)
