= Lucky Enam =

Bangladeshi television and theatre personality

- লাকী ইনাম
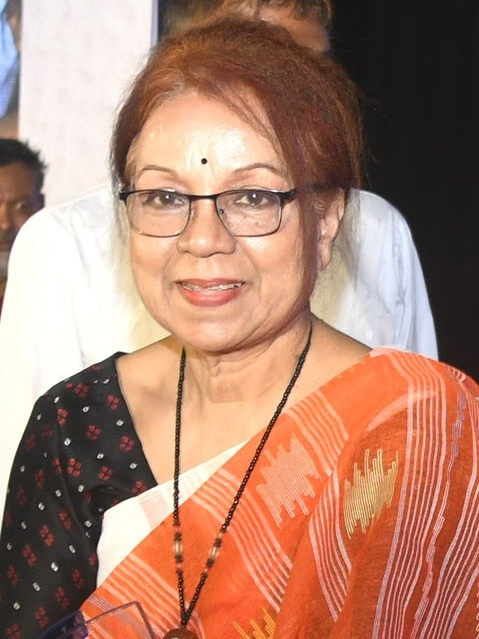
- Enam in 2023

Chairperson of Bangladesh Shishu Academy
- In office 25 September 2019 – 12 August 2024
- Preceded by: Selina Hossain
- Succeeded by: Position vacant

Personal details
- Born: 14 September 1952 (age 74)
- Spouse: Enamul Haque
- Children: Hridi Haq
- Relatives: Litu Anam (son-in-law)
- Education: University of Chittagong; University of Dhaka
- Occupation: Actor, director, playwright, theatre activist

Lucky Enam (born September 14, 1952) is a Bangladeshi television and theatre personality. She was awarded Ekushey Padak by the government of Bangladesh in 2019. She served as the chairperson of Bangladesh Shishu Academy during 2019–2024.

== Background ==
Enam was born on 14 September 1952, in Rangpur to Kalimullah Bhuiyan and Mohua. She completed her SSC from SV Girls' School and HSC from Comilla Women's College. She then earned her bachelor's and master's in economics from the University of Chittagong and University of Dhaka respectively.

== Career ==
Enam began performing in 1972 by joining the theater troupe Nagorik Natya Sampradaya. She first appeared in a dual role in the play Anubhabe Anubhutee with Pijush Bandyopadhyay in 1987. Her notable roles include Kona in Sharoma, Ambia in Nuruldiner Sarajibon, Ms. Esha in Bohubrihi and Boro Bou in Ayomoy.

Enam is the co-founder and general secretary of the theatre troupe Nagorik Nattyangan. She directed several stage plays including Ami Birangana Bolchi, Sharoma, Pragoitihashik, Sheishob Dinguli, Bideha, Muktir Upaye and Kritodasher Hashi. She also directed television drama serials Amader Ananda Bari, based on Enamul Huq's novel Greehobashi Galpo and Shesh Rakkha.

In 2012, Nagorik Nattyangan and Bangladesh Shilpakala Academy arranged a six-day theatre festival to celebrate the 60th birthday of Enam at the National Theatre Hall, Dhaka.

== Personal life ==
Enam was married to actor, theatre activist and academic Enamul Huq. Together they had two daughters – Hridi Huq and Proitee Huq.

== Awards ==
- Award of Honour for dedication in theatre (1984)
- Shilpakala Padak in 2014 by Bangladesh Shilpakala Academy
- Ekushey Padak (2019)

== Works ==
Television

- Ayomoy (1988)
- Bohubrihi (1988)
- Kothao Keu Nei (1990)
