= Anushilan Natyadal =

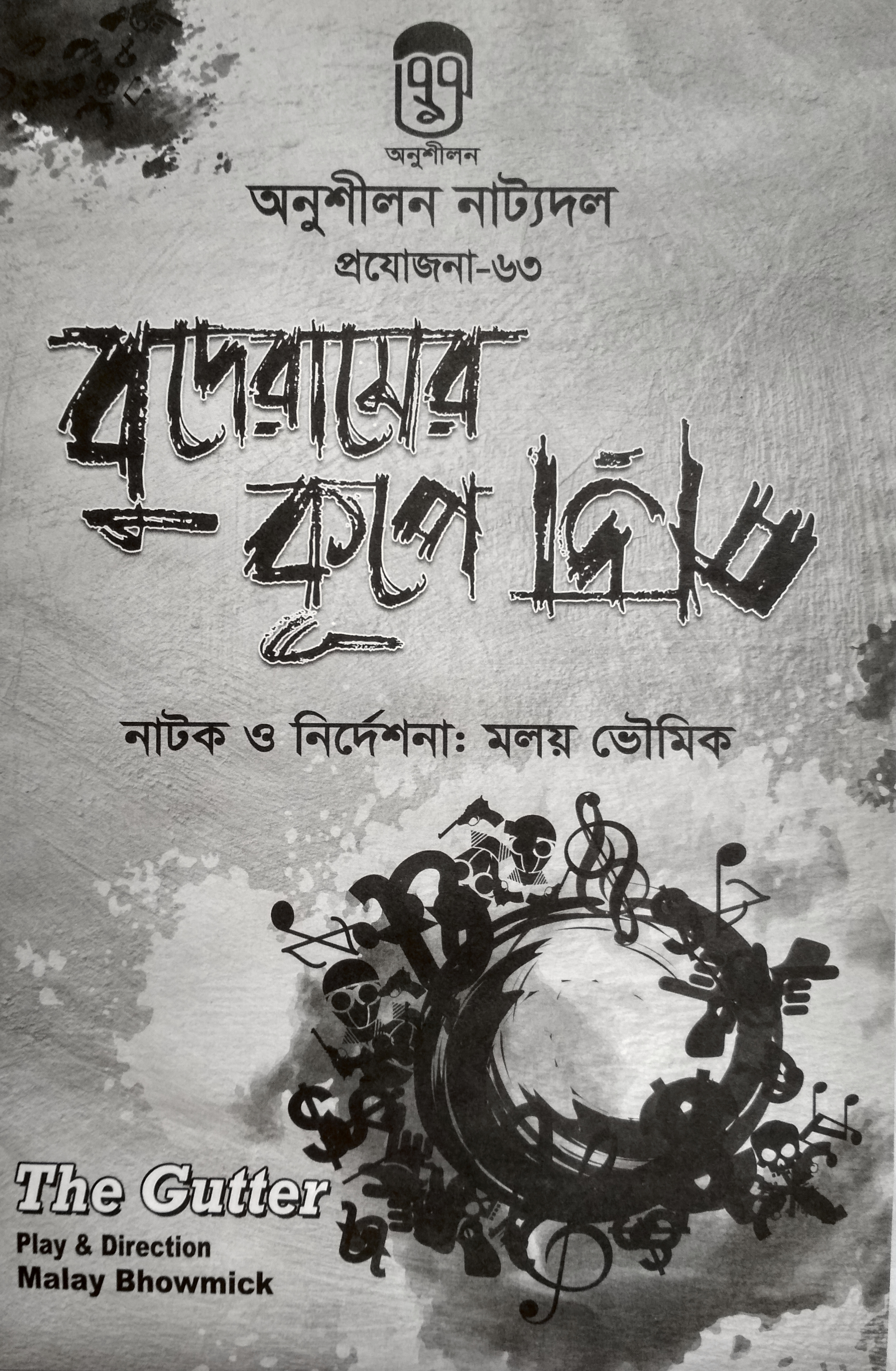
- Poster of Buderamer Kupe Pora (The Gutter) by Anushilan Natyadal
- Formation: 8 October 1979
- Type: Theatre group
- Location: Rajshahi, Bangladesh

Anushilan Natyadal is a Bangladeshi Bengali theatre group. The theatre group was founded on 8 October 1979. Most of the members of the theatre group are students of Rajshahi University.

== History ==
Anushilan Natyadal was founded on 8 October 1979. The primary aim of this theatre group was to bring social and cultural changes and generate awareness through theatre. This group produces both stage and street dramas and has produced more than 34 plays of which seven were stage dramas and twenty seven were street dramas.

The first stage drama performed by this theatre group was Ora Kadam Ali (1980). In November 2001, the group became a member of Bangladesh Group Theatre Federation.

== Productions ==
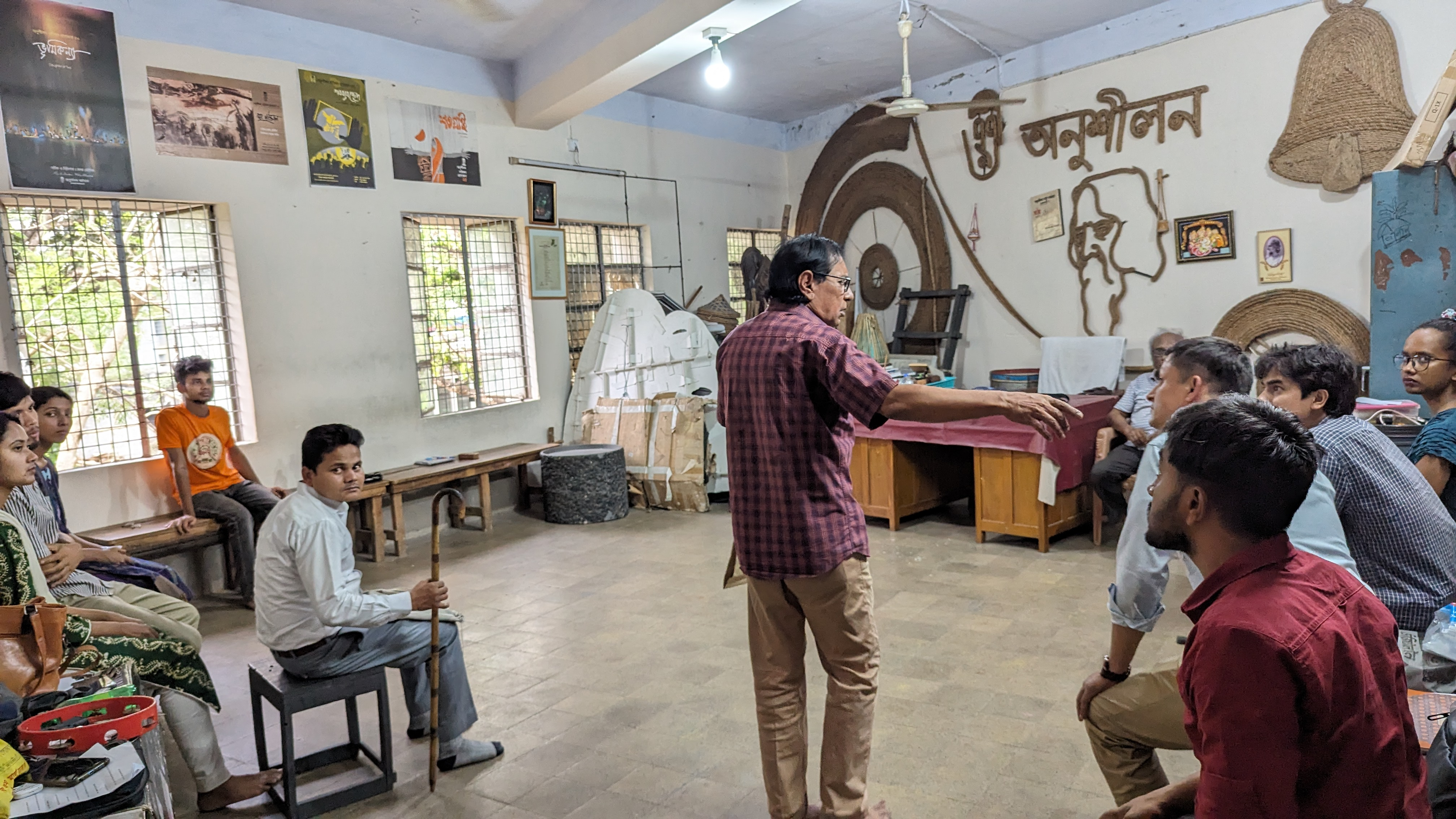
The rehearsal room of Anushilan Natyadal.

(in alphabetical order)

- Ekjon Sheuly
- Kinu Kaharer Thetar (1998)
- Ora Kadam Ali (1980)
- Rother Roshi
- Shatagranthi (1991)

== See also ==
- Nattokendro
