= Enamul Haque (actor) =

Bangladeshi actor and academic (1943–2021)

- ইনামুল হক
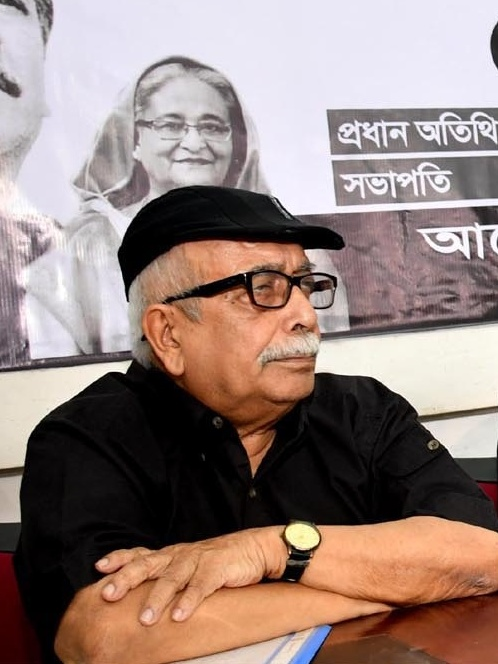
- Born: 29 May 1943; Feni District, Bengal Presidency, British India
- Died: 11 October 2021 (aged 78); Dhaka, Bangladesh
- Education: Ph.D. (Chemistry)
- Alma mater: University of Dhaka; University of Manchester
- Occupations: Actor, educator
- Spouse: Lucky Enam
- Children: Hridi Haq, Proyti Haq
- Relatives: Litu Anam (son-in-law); Saju Khadem (son-in-law)

Enamul Haque, sometimes Enamul Huq (29 May 1943 – 11 October 2021), was a Bangladeshi actor, academician and playwright. He acted in stage, television and film mediums. He was a professor at the Department of Chemistry of Bangladesh University of Engineering and Technology (BUET). He was awarded Ekushey Padak in 2012 by the government of Bangladesh for his contribution to fine arts.

== Early life, education and academic career ==
Haque was born to Obaidul Haque and Razia Khatun in Motobi area in Feni District in the then Bengal Presidency in British India. He completed his SSC from Feni Pilot High School, and HSC from Notre Dame College, Dhaka. He earned his bachelor's and master's in chemistry in 1963 and 1964 respectively from the University of Dhaka. He joined the department of chemistry, BUET in 1965 as a lecturer. He earned his Ph.D. degree from the University of Manchester in 1976 in the field of synthetic organic chemistry. He worked as a post-doctoral research fellow in medicinal chemistry in the same university from June 1976 to May 1977. Back at BUET, he was promoted to assistant professor, associate professor and professor in 1970, 1979 and 1987, respectively. He served as the chairman of the department for 15 years. He also acted as the dean of the faculty of engineering for two years.

== Career in drama ==
In 1968, Haque wrote his first television drama Onekdiner Ekdin, directed by Abdullah Al Mamun. In the same year, he debuted in acting with the television drama Mukhora Romoni Boshikoron (William Shakespeare's The Taming of the Shrew). He also wrote the scripts for more than 60 television dramas, including Sheishob Dingulo, Nirjon Shoikot and Ke Ba Apon Ke Ba Por. His notable acting works include Emiler Goenda Bahini (1980), Ei Shob Din Ratri (1985), Ayomoy (1988), Amar Bondhu Rashed (2011) and Brihonnola (2014).

Haque was a founding member of the theatre troupe Nagorik Natya Sampradaya. His theatrical productions include Bibaho Uthshob and Grihobash. In 1995, he founded his own theatre troupe, Nagorik Nattyangan.

== Personal life ==
Haque was married to actress Lucky Enam, with whom he had two daughters, Hridi Haque and Proitee Haque.

== Death ==
On 11 October 2021, Haque died at his home on Bailey Road in Dhaka at the age of 78. His body was taken to the Central Shaheed Minar and then to BUET, where numerous people paid their last respects; he was then buried at the Banani graveyard the following day.
