= Hridi Haq =

Bangladeshi actress, playwright and director

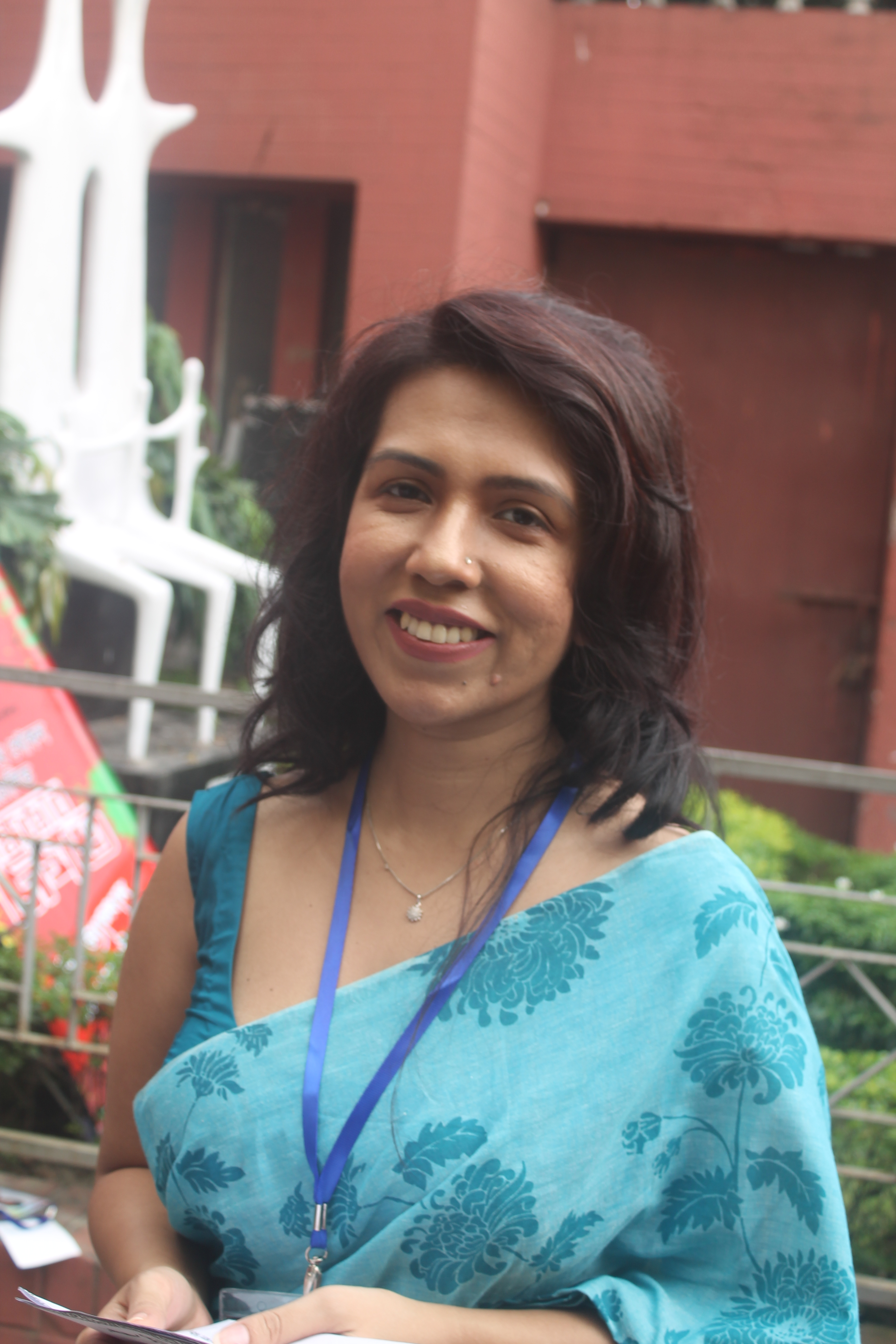
- Born: July 28; Dhaka, Bangladesh
- Education: University of Dhaka
- Occupations: Theatre activist, actor, director, playwright and producer
- Spouse: Litu Anam
- Children: 2
- Parents: Enamul Huq (father); Lucky Enam (mother)

Hridi Haq (born July 28) is a theater, film and television director, writer and actress from Dhaka, Bangladesh. She made her directorial debut with government-granted film, "1971 Shei Shob Din", which depicts the gripping narrative of Bangladesh's Liberation War. Hridi Huq is noted as the Secretary of Nagorik Nattyangon, the renowned theatre group of Bangladesh and Executive Member of Bangladesh Group Theater Federation. In 2016, she became the Joint General Secretary of Director's Guild for consecutive second term.

== Personal life ==
Hridi Huq is the daughter of theatre activist parents Lucky Enam and Enamul Huq. She has a sister, Proitee Huq, who is also a theater activist.

Huq is married to actor Litu Anam since 2005. Together they have twin children, Auniruddho Unmon and Aunoshua Hridi.

== Works ==
Theater productions
Year	Troupe	Play	Appearance	Back Stage
1993	Nagorik Nattya Shampradaya	Amader Jonmo Holo	Protester	N/A
1995	Bangladesh Shilpakala Academy	Romeo & Juliet	Juliet	N/A
1995	Nagorik Nattyangon	Amra Kobore Jabona	Lover of a Dead Soldier	N/A
1996	Nagorik Nattyangon	Jonotar Rongoshala	Sokhina	Choreographer
1997	Nagorik Nattyangon	Shoroma	Social Worker	Costume Designer
1999	Nagorik Nattyangon	Grihabashi	Moushumi	Costume Designer
2002	Nagorik Nattyangon	Golmatha Chokhamatha	Nanna	Choreographer, Costume Designer
2003	Nagorik Nattyangon	Udbaho	Agafya	Costume Designer
2004	Nagorik Nattyangon	Hobuchondro Gobuchondro	Chorus	Costume Designer
2005	Nagorik Nattyangon	Super Glue	Voyager	Costume Designer
2007	Nagorik Nattyangon	Pragoitihashik	Panchi	Costume Designer
2009	Nagorik Nattyangon	Shei Shob Dingulo	Protester	Choreographer, Costume Designer
2010	Nagorik Nattyangon	Pussy Biral O Ekjon Prokrito Manush	Zoyee	Costume Designer
2015	Nagorik Nattyangon	Gohor Badsha O Banesa Porii	Banesa Porii	Director, Dramatization
2016	Nagorik Nattyangon	Kritodasher Hashi	Meherjaan	Dramatization
2018	Nagorik Nattyangon	’71 Ekjon Nattyokar	Selina, Ruma, Bithi	Dramatization, Direction
2019	Nagorik Nattyangon	Akase Phuiteche Phul – Leto Kahon	Shahida	Director

As script writer and director
Production	Category	Channel	Designation
Amader Anondo Bari	Television Series	NTV	Script Writer
Nineteen Twenty	Television Series	NTV	Director, Script Writer
Hey Rajkonna	Telefilm	Bangla Vision	Director, Script Writer
Deyal	Television Series	NTV	Director, Script Writer
Icarus er Dana	Television Series	Boishakhi	Director, Script Writer
1971 Shei Shob Dingulo	Television Film Series	Channel I	Director, Script Writer
Sesh Bikeler Gaan	Television Series	NTV	Director, Script Writer
Chakryabyoho	Single Drama	SATV	Director
Baba	Single Drama	NTV	Script Writer
Chokher Aloy Dekhechilem Choker Bahire	Single Drama	NTV	Script Writer
Borshar Golpo	Single Drama	RTV	Director
Boishakhi Mime Troupe	Single Drama	NTV	Director, Script Writer
Lady in Blue	Single Drama	NTV	Director, Script Writer
Meye	Television Series		Script Writer

Film
Name	Year	Role	Comments
1971 Shei Shob Din	2023	Director	Directorial debut

Other engagements
Year	Organization	Responsibility
2016–2018	Bangladesh Group Theatre Federation	Executive Member
2011–2021	Nagorik Nattyangon	Organizing Secretary
2022 - till date	Nagorik Nattyangon	Secretary
2022 – Till Date	Nagorik Nattyangon Institute of Drama	Chairman
2016 – 2020	Directors Guild	Joint General Secretary
