= Padatik (poetry collection) =

- Padatik book front cover
- Author: Subhash Mukhopadhyay
- Language: Bengali
- Genre: Poetry
- Publication date: 1940
- Publication place: India

Padatik (The Foot Soldier) first published in 1940 is a Bengali book of poems written by Subhash Mukhopadhyay. This was Mukhopadhyay's first published book. This book created a storm in Bengali literature. Mukhopadhyay wrote this book as a representative of a political party. Mukhopadhyay in his personal life was a consistent Marxist. In this book, poet showed his zeal to redeem the poor and suffering masses from exploitation.

== Legacy ==
- For the popularity of the book Subhash Mukhopadhyay is often called "Padatik Subhash Mukhopadhyay" or "Padatik poet Subhash Mukhopadhyay",
- In 2009 Sealdah-NJP Express was named "Padatik Express" after this book in memory of the poet.
