= List of educational institutions in Kushtia =

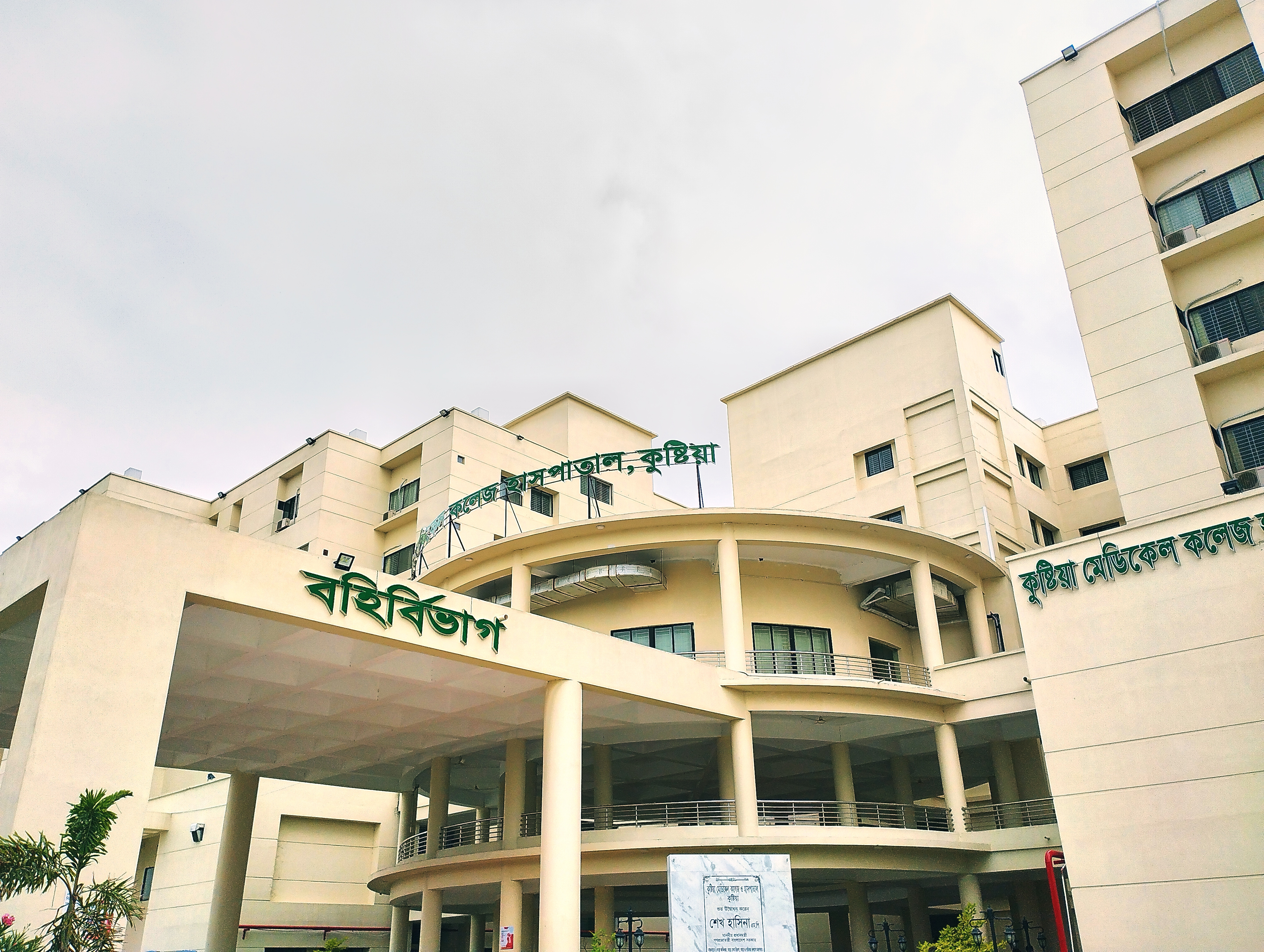
outpatient department building of Medical College

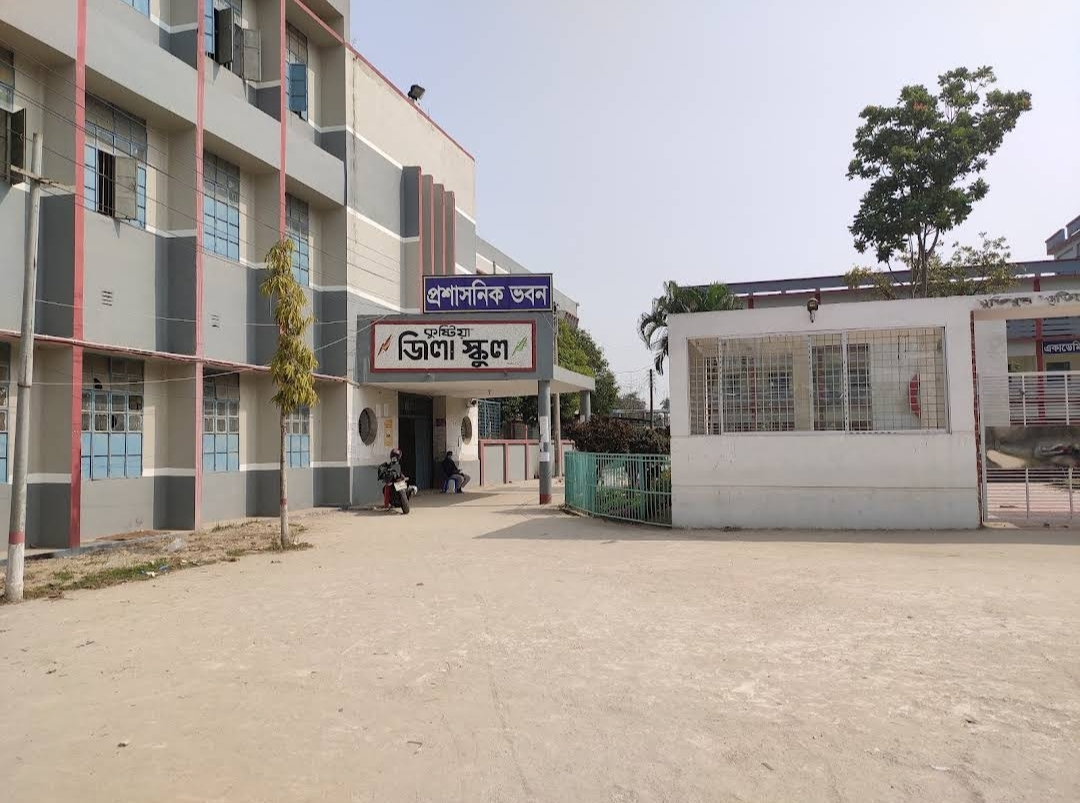
Administrative building and Muktijudhho memorial of Zilla School

This is a list of educational institutions in Kushtia city, Bangladesh.

== Universities ==
There are 3 universities in Kushtia.

- Justice Abu Zafar Siddique Science and Technology University
- Rabindra Maitree University
- Lalon Science and Arts University, Kushtia

== Medical colleges ==
- Kushtia Medical College
- Selima Medical College and Hospital

== Colleges ==
=== Government colleges ===
There are 3 government colleges in Kushtia.

- Kushtia Government College
- Kushtia Government Mohila College
- Kushtia Government Central College

=== MPO colleges ===
There are 5 mpo colleges in Kushtia.

- Kushtia Adarsha Degree College
- Kushtia Islamia College
- Kushtia City College
- Gorai Mohila College
- Syed Masood Rumi Degree College

== Technical educational institutions ==
=== Government ===
- Technical Training Center
- Kushtia Government Polytechnic Institute
- Kushtia Government Technical School and College

=== Non-govt ===
- Kushtia Institute of Science and Technology
- Graduate Institute of Agriculture and Technology
- Kushtia Institute of Engineering and Technology
- Kushtia City Polytechnic and Engineering Institute
- Gurukul Polytechnic Institute
- Darpan Polytechnic Institute
- IDEAL POLYTECHNIC INSTITUTE (IPI)

== Nursing institutes ==
=== Government ===
- Medical Assistant Training School

=== Non-govt ===
- Alo Medical Assistant Training School
- Dr. Liza-Dr. Ratan Medical Assistant Training School
- Specialized Medical Assistant Training School
- Lalon Shah Medical Assistant Training School
- Padma Garai Medical Assistant Training School

== Higher secondary schools ==
=== MPO ===
- Collectorate School and College
- K.S.M. Dhaka Minipara Higher Secondary School
- Police Lines School and College

=== Non-govt ===
- Educare Ideal School and College
- SUNUP International School and College
- Hasib Dream School College

== Secondary/high school ==
=== Government ===
- Kushtia Zilla School
- Kushtia Government Girls High School

=== MPO ===
- Aruapara Secondary Girls School
- Kushtia Adarsh Secondary School
- Kalkakali Secondary School
- Kushtia High School
- Jagati Secondary School
- G.K. secondary school
- Chaudharhans Mukul Sangh Secondary Girls School
- Dinmani Secondary School
- Barkhada Secondary School
- Milpara Secondary Girls School
- Mohini Mohan Vidyapeeth
- Lahini Secondary School
- Sahittik Mir Mosharraf Hossain Secondary School
- Sirajul Haque Muslim Secondary School
- Housing Estate Secondary School
- Hasan Zaman Lalon Secondary School

=== Non-govt ===
- Proteitei school
- School of Laureates International
- Merit Model School
