= List of streets and roads in Kushtia =

== Lists ==
=== Highways ===
Name	Part of	Length	Starting point	Ending point	Description	Image
Jhenaidah Road	N704 (Bangladesh)	4.6 km (2.9 mi)	Mazampur Gate	Battail intersection		Saddam Bazar, East Mazampur
Dadapur Road	N704 (Bangladesh)	4.3 km (2.7 mi)	Mazampur Gate	Barkhada/Trimohoni		Alpha Mor
Dhaka Road	R710 (Bangladesh)	4.4 km (2.7 mi)	Chourhas intersection (N704)	Cheuria/Dobir Mollar Gate		Kushtia Medical
Kushtia city bypass road	N713 (Bangladesh)	6.6 km (4.1 mi)	Trimohoni Bypass Gate/Barkhada	Battail intersection		Kushtia Sugar Mill area

=== Others ===
Name	Image	Length	Locations	Starting point	Ending point	Description
Ajinul Jalil Road			Courtpara	Maiur Square	Hospital Mor	
Ambika Charar Mukherjee Road		0.7 km (0.43 mi)	Thanapara	Renwick Gate	Choy Rastar Mor	
Arjun Das Agarwala Road/Rab Gali		0.65 km (0.40 mi)	Courtpara	Jhautala (Mazampur)	College Mor	
Baroari Tala Road		0.35 km (0.22 mi)	Big Bazar	Big Bazar rail gate	Big Bazar Ghat	
Bicharpati Mahbub Morshed Road		1.4 km (0.87 mi)	Mollategharia, Housing Estate, Pearatala, Courtpara	Mollategharia Mor	Hospital Mor	
BRRI Road						
Chand Mohammad Road	Aarong	0.4 km (0.25 mi)	Thanapara	Thanar Mor/Bak Chattar	Haripur Bridge	
Chaudhary Kawser Ahmed Road		0.45 km (0.28 mi)	Thanapara	Mazampur Gate	Renwick Gate	
Chinikal Road/ Jagati Sugar Mill Road/ Jagati Station Road			Chourhas, Jagati, Chenchua	Chourhas Mor		
Damdama Road			Lahini	Lahini Battala (Dhaka Road)		
DC Bungalow Road		0.5 km (0.31 mi)	Chourhas	Custom's Mor (PTI Road)	Collectorate Square (DC Court)	
Dr. Ainuddin Biswas Road			Kalishankarpur			
Girjanath Majumdar road		1.1 km (0.68 mi)	Thanapara, Kamalapur	Renwick Gate	Alpha Mor (Dadapur Road)	
Islamia College Lane			Thanapara	NS Road	Court Station	
Jitendranath Majumdar Lane			Courtpara	Court Station		
Kazi Nazrul Islam Road			Courtpara	Kushtia Court Station	Sono Tower	
Khodadad Khan Road			Thanapara	NS Road		
Lalon Shah Road	Lalon Fari 2025				Dobir Mollar Gate (R710)	
Mahtab Uddin Road			Courtpara, Eidgahpara, Kalishankarpur			
Mir Ibrahim Road			Courtpara, Eidgahpara	KGC (MM Hossain Road)	Narikeltala (Sir Iqbal Road)	
Mir Mosharraf Hossain Road		1.9 km (1.2 mi)	Courtpara, Eidgahpara, Aruapara, Millpara	College Mor (RCRC Road)	Chauler Border	
Mojibor Rahman Road			Chorhas	Phultala (Jhenaidah Road)	Jailkhana Mor	
Moksed Shai Road						
M.U. Bhuia Road			Courtpara	Hospital Mor		
Muktijoddha Bahauddin Road			East Mazampur, Courtpara	Saddam Bazar (N704)	Maiur Square	
Nawab Sirajuddaula Road		2.7 km (1.7 mi)	Thanapara, Aruapara, Kuthipara, Big Bazar	Municipal gate	Big Bazar rail gate	
Nuruddin Ahmed Road				Lahinibotala		
Ostad Bhai Road			East Mazampur	Saddam Bazar (N704)		
PTI Road						
R.A. Khan Chaudhary Road		0.7 km (0.43 mi)	Thanapara, Mazampur	Mazampur Gate	Choy Rastar Mor	
Raja Promoth Bhushan Dev Roy Road						
R.C.R.C Road						
Shashi Bhushan Pramanik Road						
Shirish Chandra Banerjee Road			Thanapara, Kuthipara			
Sir Iqbal Road						
Sonar Bangla Road						
Surendranath Rai Lane			Courtpara			
Upazila Road						

- Aga Yusuf Road
- Audhir Karim Road
- Kabi Azizur Rahman Road
- Mohini Mohon Chakrabarrti Road

=== Other Roads ===
- Mahtab Uddin Road
- MU Bhuyan Road
- Palan Box Road
- Samsum Obyed Road
- Titumir Road
- Wares Hossain Road

=== Lanes ===
- Ananda Mohan Bagchi Lane
- Bholanath Pual Lane
- Keramot Ali Lane
- Masjid Bari 1st Lane
