= Kushtia =

City and District headquarters of Kushtia District

Kushtia কুষ্টিয়া Custia custia
- City
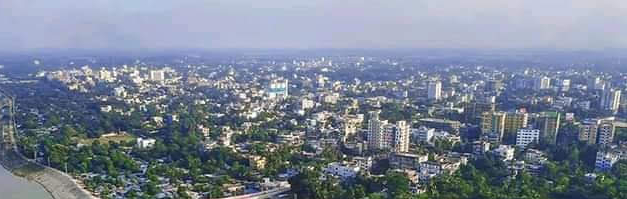
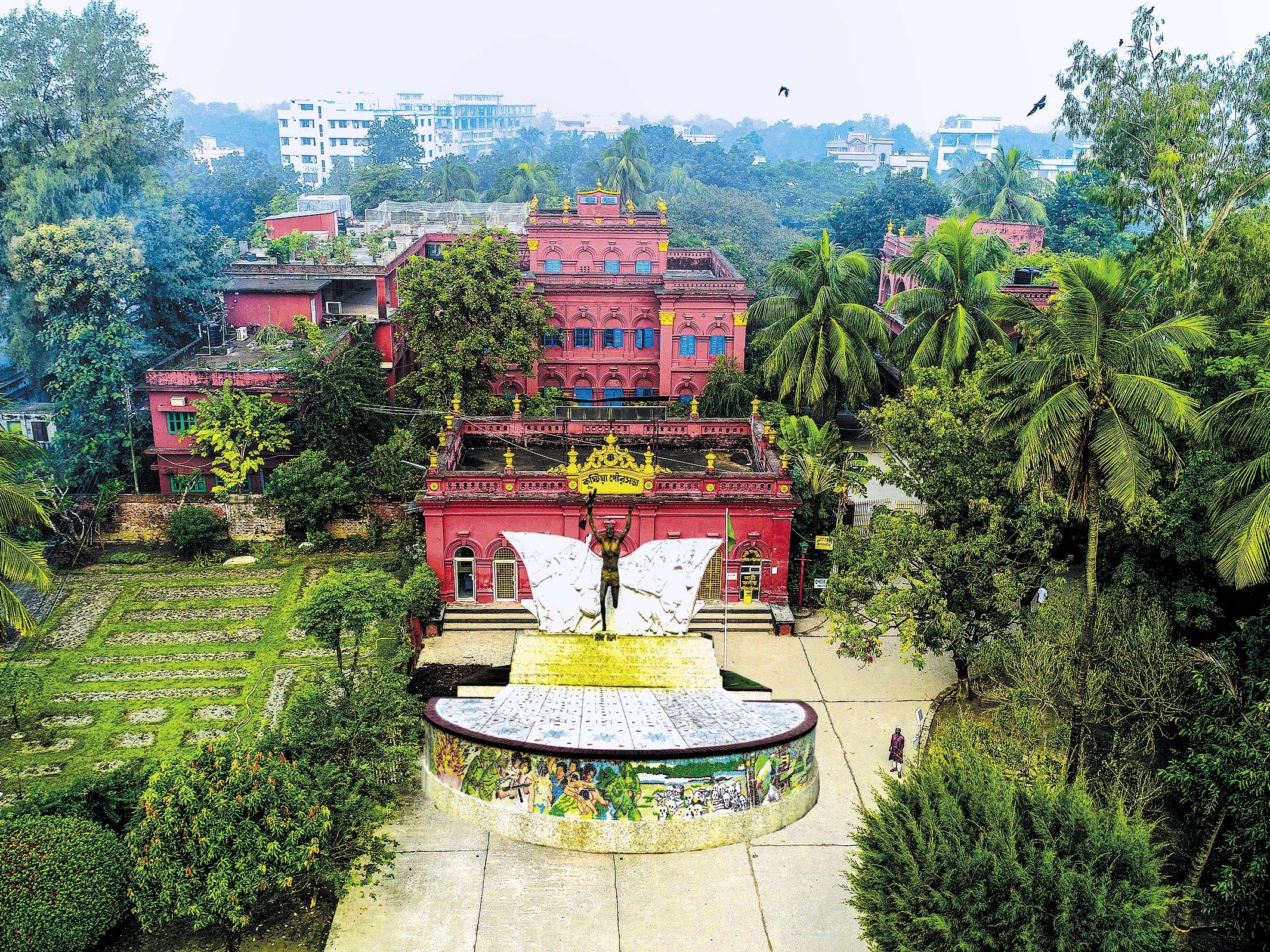
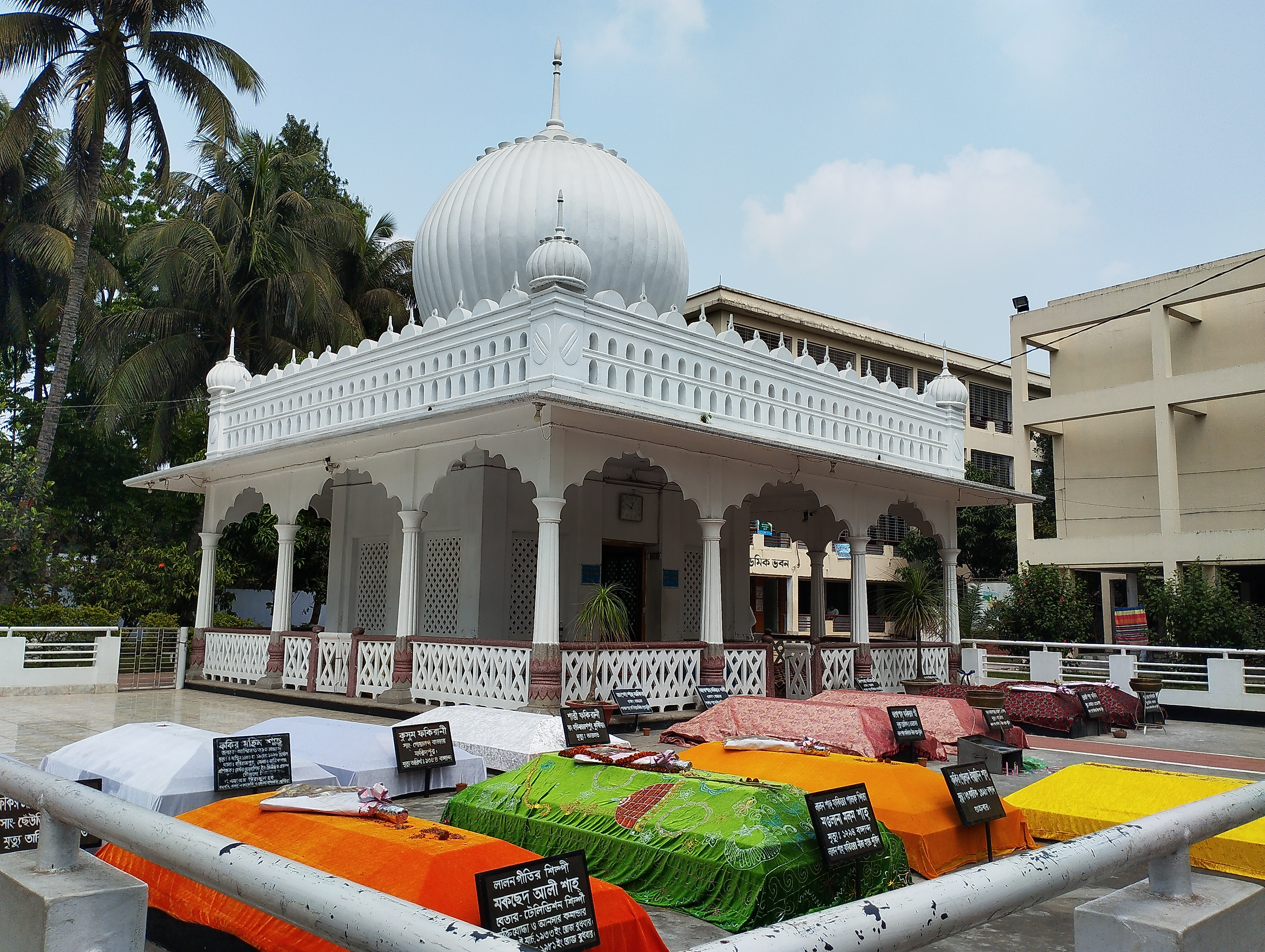
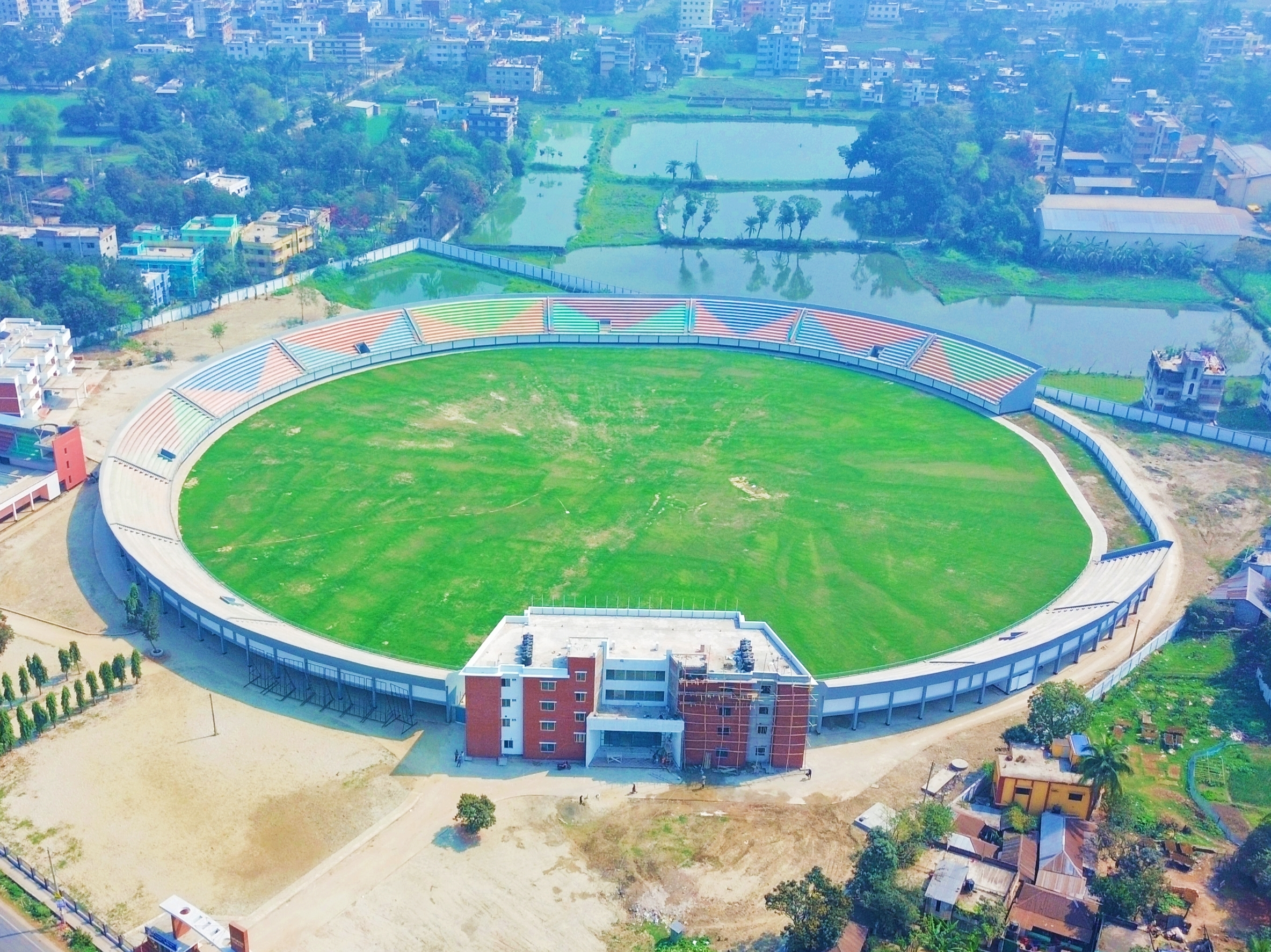
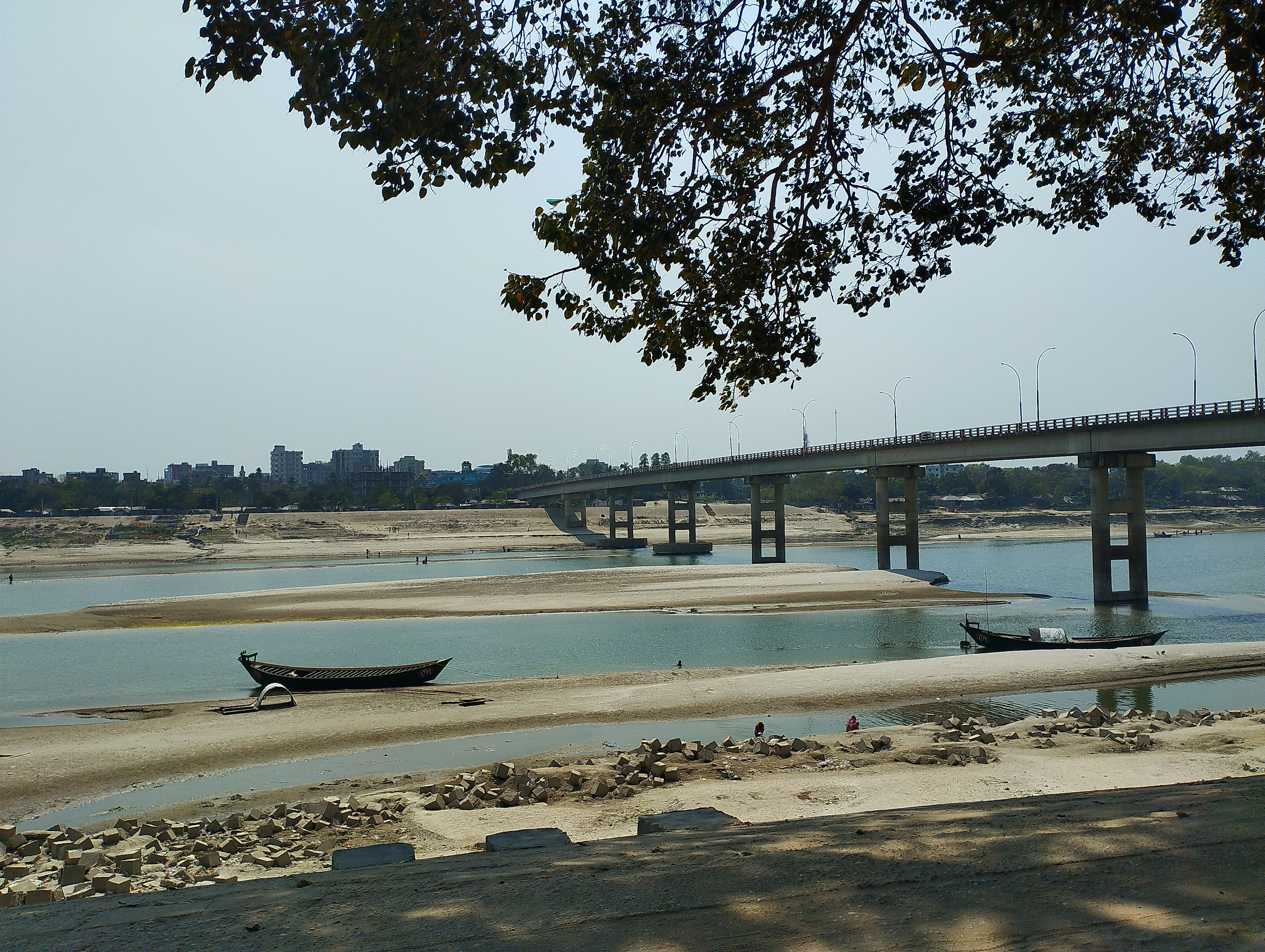
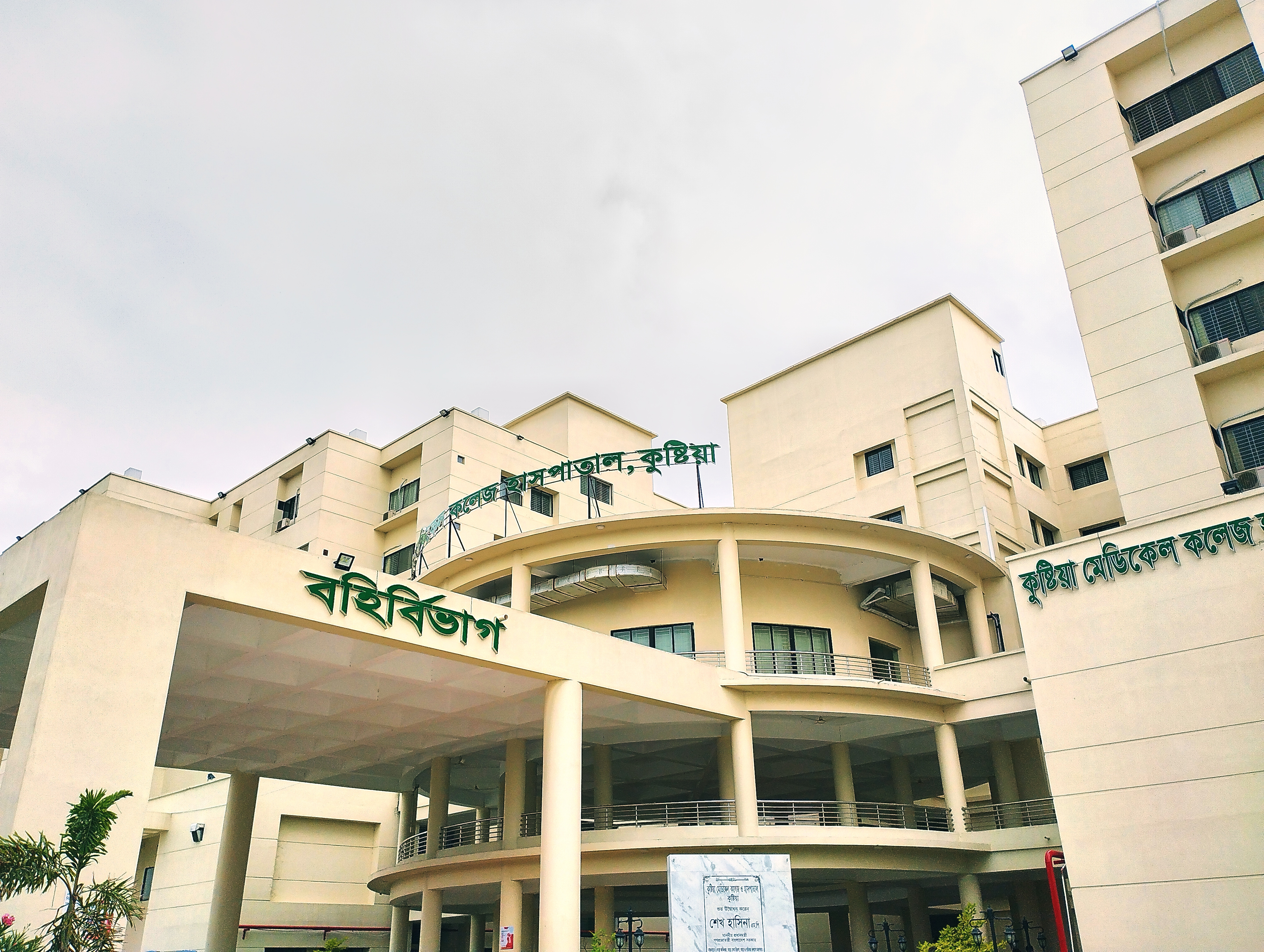
- Skyline of Kushtia Kushtia Municipal Building Mausoleum of Lalon Shah Kushtia Stadium Shilpakala Academy Haripur Bridge Kushtia Medical College
- Nickname: Cultural capital
- Location within Khulna Division Location within Bangladesh
- Coordinates: 23.904082°N 89.126157°E
- Country: Bangladesh
- Division: Khulna
- District: Kushtia
- Upazila: Kushtia Sadar
- Municipality established: April 1, 1869; 157 years ago

Government
  - Type: Municipality
  - Body: Kushtia Municipality

Area
  - Urban: 42.79 km^{2} (16.52 sq mi)

Population (2022)
  - Urban: 221,804
  - Urban density: 5,184/km^{2} (13,430/sq mi)
- Time zone: UTC+06:00 (Bangladesh Standard Time)
- Postcode: 7000, 7001, 7002
- Municipal code: 60
- ISO 3166 code: BD-30
- Website: Kushtia Municipality

Kushtia (Bengali: কুষ্টিয়া is a city located on the banks of the Gorai River in Bangladesh. It serves as the headquarters of Kushtia District and is considered the cultural capital of Bangladesh. The city is known for its Tiler Khaja (sesame sweets), kulfi malai, and the Mausoleum of Lalon Shah. Kushtia is home to numerous medium and heavy industries that play a vital role in the national economy. The area of Kushtia Municipality is 42.79 square kilometres (16.52 sq mi). According to the 2022 Bangladeshi census, the population of Kushtia Municipality is 221,804.

In 1864, the 'Kushtia Union Committee' was formed with 10 villages under the Kushtia subdivision. During this time, the town of Kushtia developed in the mouzas of Mojompur and Bahadurkhali. In 1869, the Kushtia Municipality was established. With the construction of the Kushtia and Kushtia Court railway station in 1871 various industries began to emerge in the town. Among them, Mohini Mill and Renwick Jajneswar & Co Limited are notable.

== Etymology ==
Kushtia has long been widely recognized as the "Cultural Capital" of Bangladesh. However, there are differing opinions among historians regarding the origin of the name "Kushtia." The most widely accepted theory is found in Hamilton’s Gazette published in 1820. According to it Kushtia was once a major producer of jute. In the local dialect jute was called "Koshta" (a term still in use) or "Kushti" from which the name "Kushtia" is believed to have originated.

Some believe the name came from the Persian word 'Kushtah', meaning 'island of ashes'. Another theory suggests that the town developed around the "Kushti port" during the reign of the fifth Mughal emperor Shah Jahan.

== Geography ==
Kushtia is located to the west of the capital Dhaka, north of Khulna, and southeast of Rajshahi between 23º42΄ to 23º59΄ north latitude and 88º55΄ to 89º04΄ east longitude.

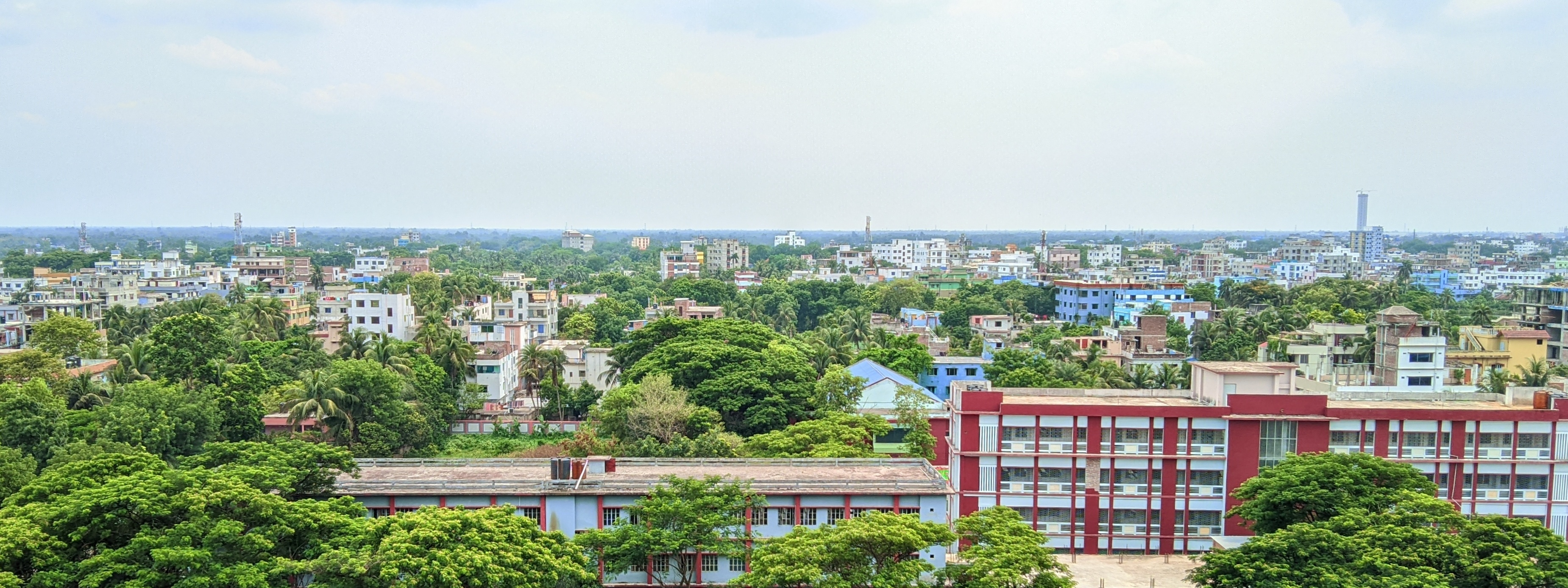
Southern part of the city

=== Rivers and Canals ===
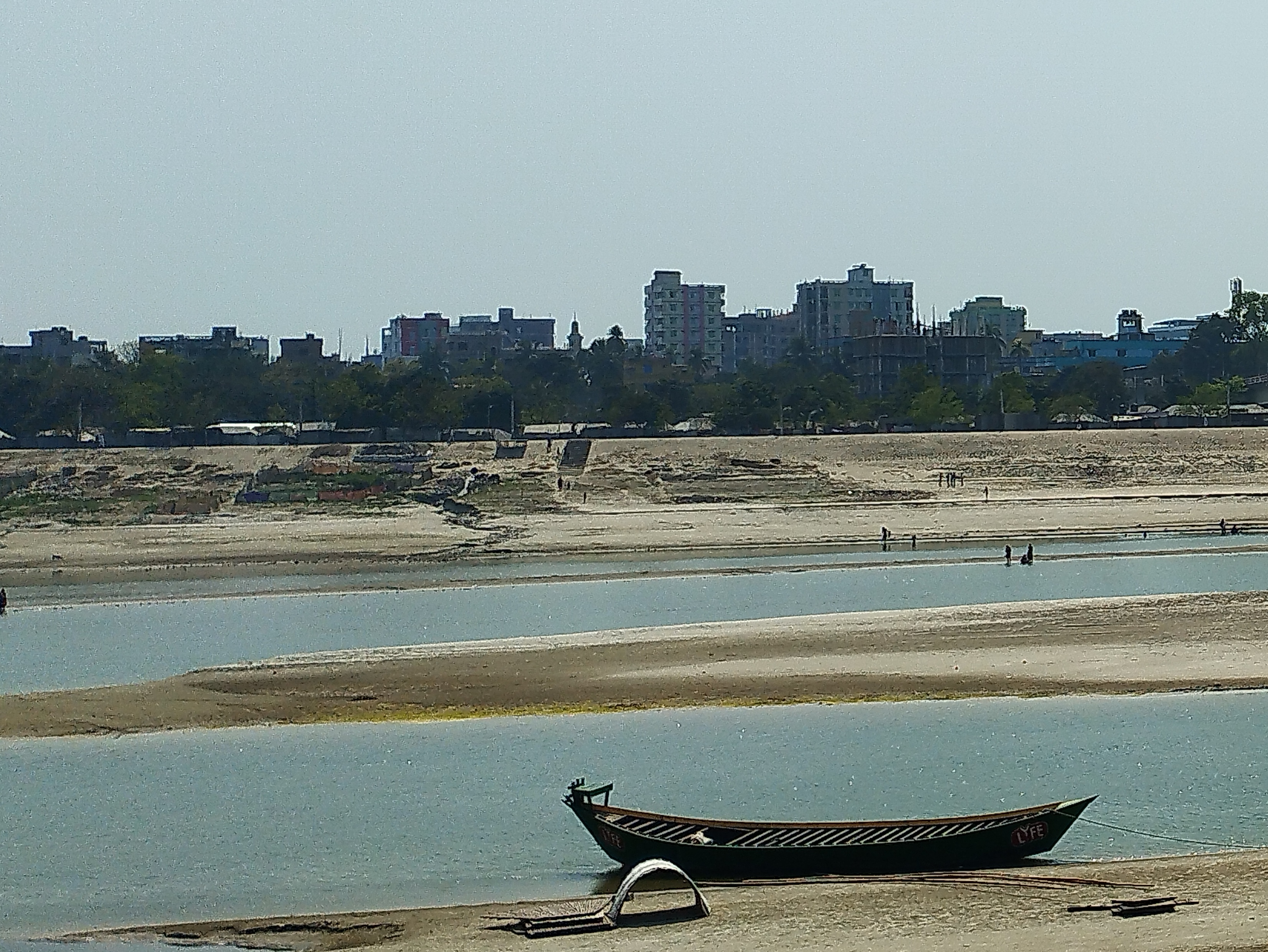
The Gorai River near Haripur Bridge

To the north of Kushtia flows the Gorai River and to the east lies the Kaliganga River. The city mainly developed around the Gorai River. The Gorai is a distributary of the Padma River and the Kaliganga is a branch of the Gorai. To improve connectivity between the city and the areas of Haripur and Kaya, a road bridge was constructed between 2013 and 2017 from Thanapara to Haripur named Haripur Bridge. People also cross the river via Ghorar Ghat in the Big Bazar area.

In 1949, the Gorai Canal was excavated to benefit Kushtia’s municipal residents, reduce waterlogging of agricultural land in parts of Mirpur Upazila, and expand the local waterways. The canal is 8.5 kilometres (5.3 mi) long. In 1954–55 under the Ganges-Kobadak Irrigation Project the Chourhas Canal was excavated.

== Transport ==
Road

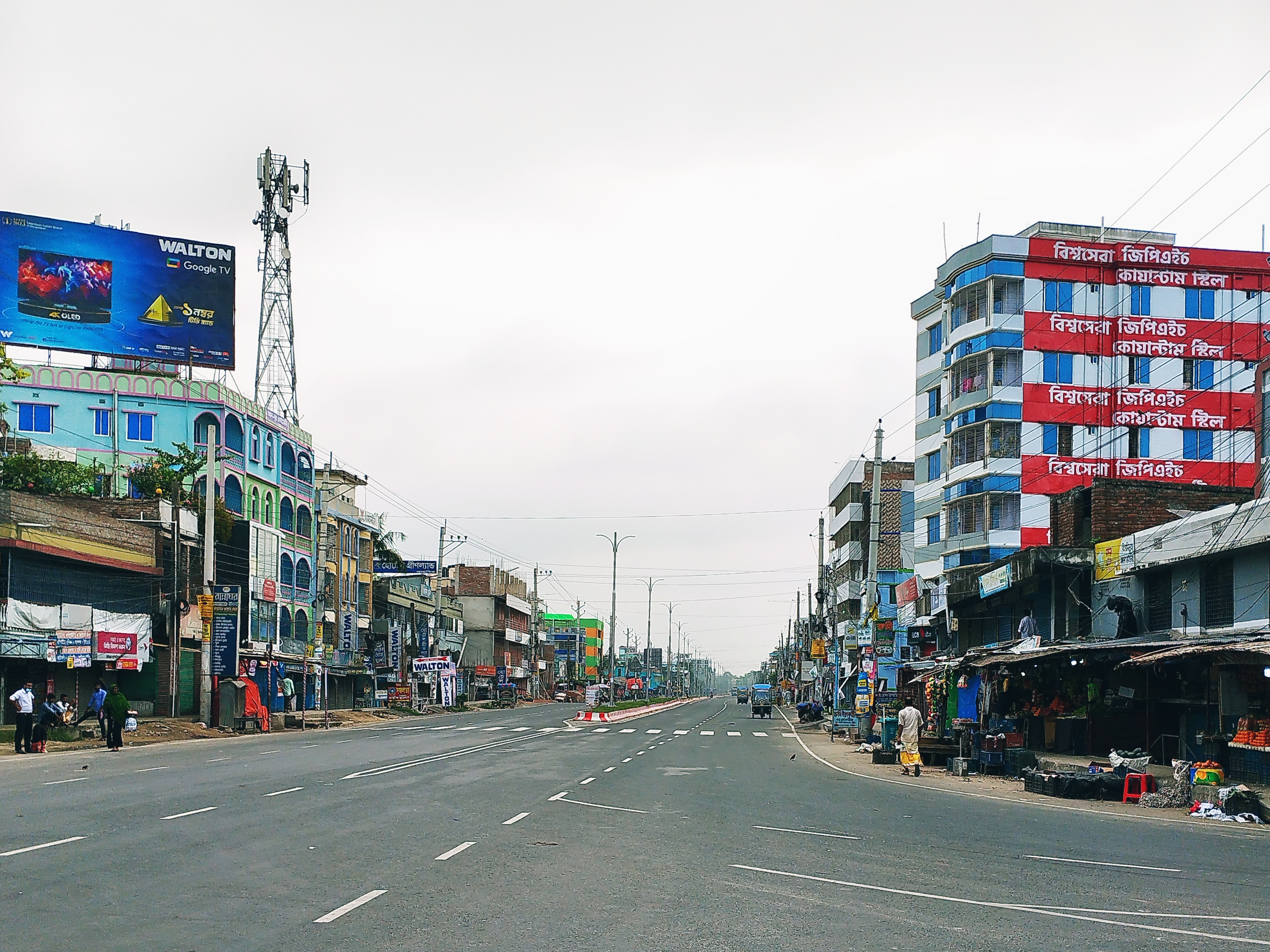
Chourhas Mor

A bus terminal was constructed in Kushtia in 1991 known as Kushtia Central Bus Terminal or Chourhas Bus Terminal.

The commercial activities of the city are centered around NS Road. The city is connected by two national highways and three regional highways. The national highways are N704 known as the Kushtia–Jhenaidah or Kushtia–Rajshahi Highway, and N713 also known as the Kushtia Bypass Road which was constructed between 2016 and 2018. The Kushtia–Jhenaidah Highway was upgraded to four lanes between 2020 and 2025. The regional highways are R710 known as the Kushtia–Dhaka or Kushtia–Rajbari Highway, R745 known as Kushtia–Meherpur Highway and R747 known as Kushtia–Chuadanga Highway.

Rail

The first railway station in Bangladesh Jagati railway station is located in Jagati, Kushtia. On 15 November 1862 a 53.11 km broad-gauge railway line from Ranaghat in Kolkata to Jagati was inaugurated and the Jagati station was constructed. Later on 1 January 1871 the railway line was extended by 75 km to Goalundo Ghat leading to the establishment of Kushtia Court and Kushtia railway stations. Currently, Kushtia Court railway station is the main station in Kushtia. It serves 4 intercity trains, 1 commuter train and 1 local train.

== Education ==
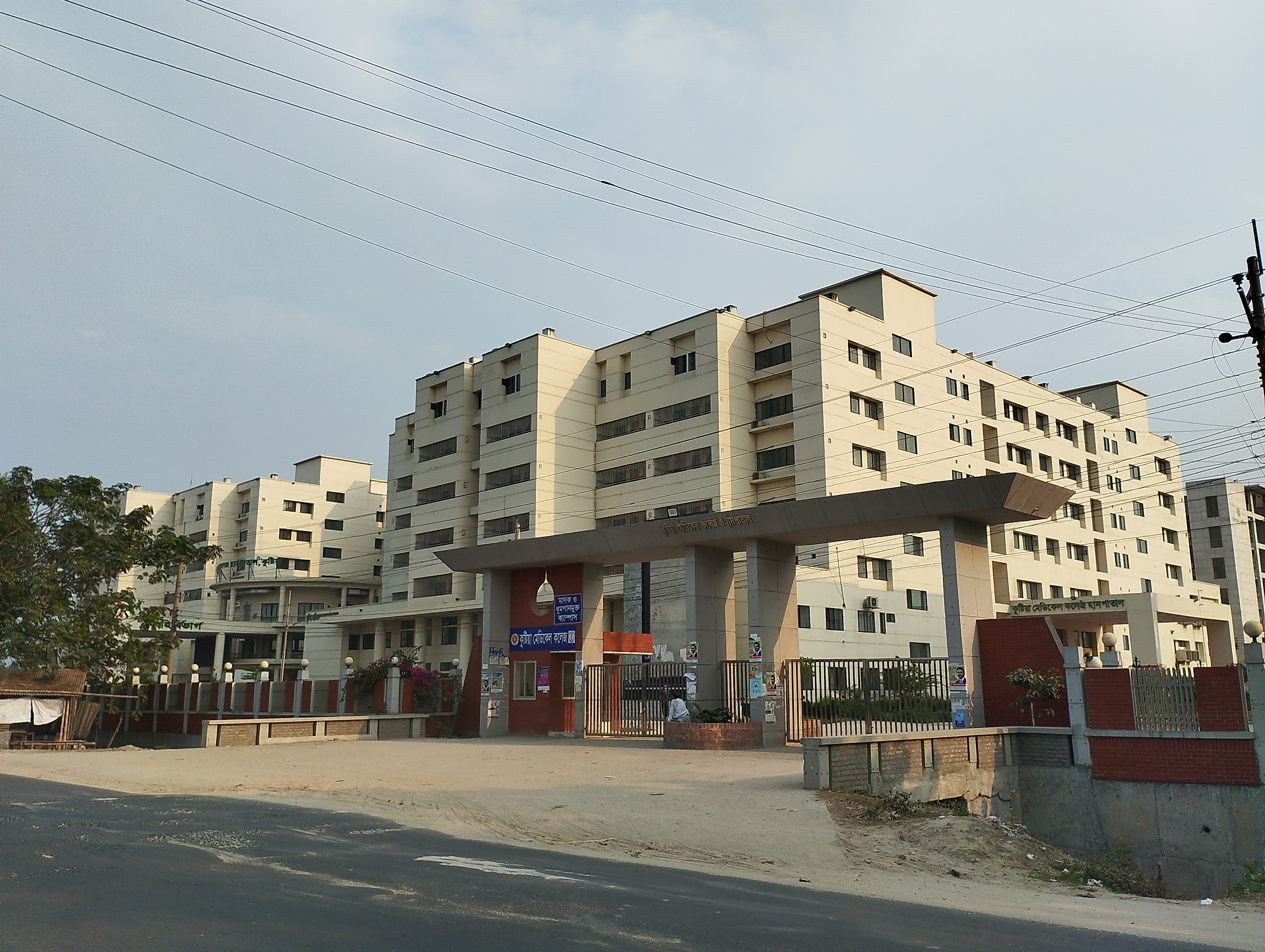
Kushtia Medical College

During British rule several schools were established in Kushtia including Kushtia High School (1861), Kushtia Government Girls High School (1884), Kushtia Mission Secondary School (1898), Jagati Secondary School (1914), Dinmoni Secondary School (1930), Mohini Mohon Vidyapith (1941), and Sirajul Haque Muslim Secondary School (1945). In 1961 Kushtia Zilla School was founded which is currently one of the most popular schools in the city.

A college was established in Kushtia in 1910 but was closed due to lack of government financial support. Later in 1947 Kushtia College was established. It was nationalized in 1965 and renamed 'Kushtia Government College'. In 1964 Kushtia Polytechnic Institute was founded. In 1966 Kushtia Government Mohila College was established which was nationalized in 1979 and renamed 'Kushtia Government Women's College'. In 1967 the Government Commercial Institute was established which is now known as Kushtia Government Central College. In 1983 Kushtia Homeopathic Medical College was founded. In 1984 Kushtia Government Technical School and College was established. The plan to establish a medical college in Kushtia was initiated in 1978–1979 but it was postponed. Eventually in 2011 Kushtia Medical College was established and began its academic activities at Kushtia General Hospital. The college was officially inaugurated in 2023.

Kushtia has six colleges affiliated with the National University. These are Kushtia Government College Kushtia Government Mohila College Kushtia Islamia College Kushtia Adarsha Degree College Gorai Mohila College and Syed Masud Rumi Degree College. Other secondary and higher secondary institutions in Kushtia fall under the jurisdiction of the Board of Intermediate and Secondary Education, Jessore.

== Economy ==
The economy of Kushtia is industry-based. The medium and heavy industries located here contribute to the national economy. In addition to the BSCIC Industrial neighbourhoods Khajanagar and Poradah also play a significant role in this regard. According to a 2019 report by Prothom Alo 30 percent of Bangladesh's rice demand is met by production in Khajanagar.

Big Bazar

The commercial center of Kushtia is Big Bazar. This market developed on the bank of the Gorai River at the eastern end of NS Road. The age of the market is evident from its old buildings and other infrastructure. The famous 'Rajar hat' (Hat of king) of Kushtia is located on the southern side of Big Bazar. On the northern side of the market, there is a ghat named 'Ghorar Ghat'. An advisory committee is responsible for managing this market.

== Demographics ==
Historical population
Year	Pop.	±% p.a.
1872	9,245	—
1881	9,717	+0.55%
1891	11,199	+1.43%
1901	5,330	−7.16%
1911	6,095	+1.35%
1921	7,849	+2.56%
1931	9,405	+1.83%
1941	13,842	+3.94%
1951	21,129	+4.32%
1961	24,952	+1.68%
1974	36,199	+2.90%
1981	71,062	+10.12%
1991	72,427	+0.19%
2001	86,066	+1.74%
2011	102,988	+1.81%
2022	221,806	+7.22%
Note: In 1901, three wards of Kushtia Municipality were separated to form a union.

Religions in Kushtia Paurashava (2022)
Religion	Percent
Islam	93.64%
Hinduism	6.31%
Other or not stated	0.05%

According to the 2022 Bangladesh census, Kushtia city had 58,214 households and a population of 221,806. Kushtia had a literacy rate of 84.04%: 86.37% for males and 81.67% for females, and a sex ratio of 102.42 males per 100 females. 7.43% of the population was under 5 years of age.

According to the 2011 Bangladesh census, Kushtia city had 23,037 households and a population of 102,988. 15,788 (15.33%) were under 10 years of age. Kushtia had a literacy rate (age 7 and over) of 74.85%, compared to the national average of 51.8%, and a sex ratio of 947 females per 1000 males.

== Places of interest ==
- Mausoleum of Lalon Shah
- Kushtia Municipality Office
  - Municipal Building
  - Municipal Museum
  - Bijoy Ullas (sculpture)
  - Palki and Bearers (sculpture)
- Tagore Lodge (Kushtia Kuthi Bari)
- Mohini Mill

Parks and entertainment centers

- Kamrul Islam Siddique Municipal Shishu Park
- Shaheed Ziaur Rahman Shishu Park
- Porimal Theatre
- Shaheed Abrar Fahad Stadium
- Kushtia Swimming Pool
- Haripur Bridge
- Zila Parishad Rabindra-Lalon Garden

== Notable people ==
- Abrar Fahad – BUET student who was beaten to death by leaders of the university's Chhatra League branch
- Abdul Karim Shah – Bangladeshi Baul singer
- Abul Ahsan Chowdhury – Writer and researcher
- Abul Barkat – (born: 27 September 1954) Professor and former Chairman of the Department of Economics at University of Dhaka
- Ahmed Kamal – Bangladeshi cricketer
- Aminul Haque Badsha – Co-founder of the Swadhin Bangla Betar Kendra, journalist, and author
- M Amir-ul Islam – Bangladeshi legal expert, politician, and former minister
- Anamul Haque – Bangladeshi cricketer
- Bibudhendra Sarkar – Canadian researcher
- Chandana Mazumdar – Bangladeshi vocalist
- Chamok Hasan – Bangladeshi author
- Farida Parveen – Renowned Bangladeshi singer
- Faruk Quazi – Bangladeshi journalist and legal reporter
- Haradhan Banerjee – Bengali film and television actor
- Jagadish Gupta – Bengali novelist and short story writer
- Khalid Hossain – Ekushey Padak-winning Nazrul Sangeet singer and researcher
- Milton Khondokar – Film lyricist, music director, and filmmaker
- Mohammad Badruddoza – Politician of Jatiya Party (Ershad) and former Member of Parliament for Kushtia-3
- Rashid Askari-- Bilingual writer, translator, educationist, former Vice-chancellor of Islamic University, Bangladesh, and Director general of Bangla Academy.
- Sabuz Hossain – Footballer in the Bangladesh Premier League
- Sayeem Rana – Lyricist, composer, music director, and professor
- S.I. Tutul – Bangladeshi singer
- Zobeda Khanum - Educationist and litterateur
- Habibul Bashar - Bangladeshi Cricketer & Selector

== Gallery ==
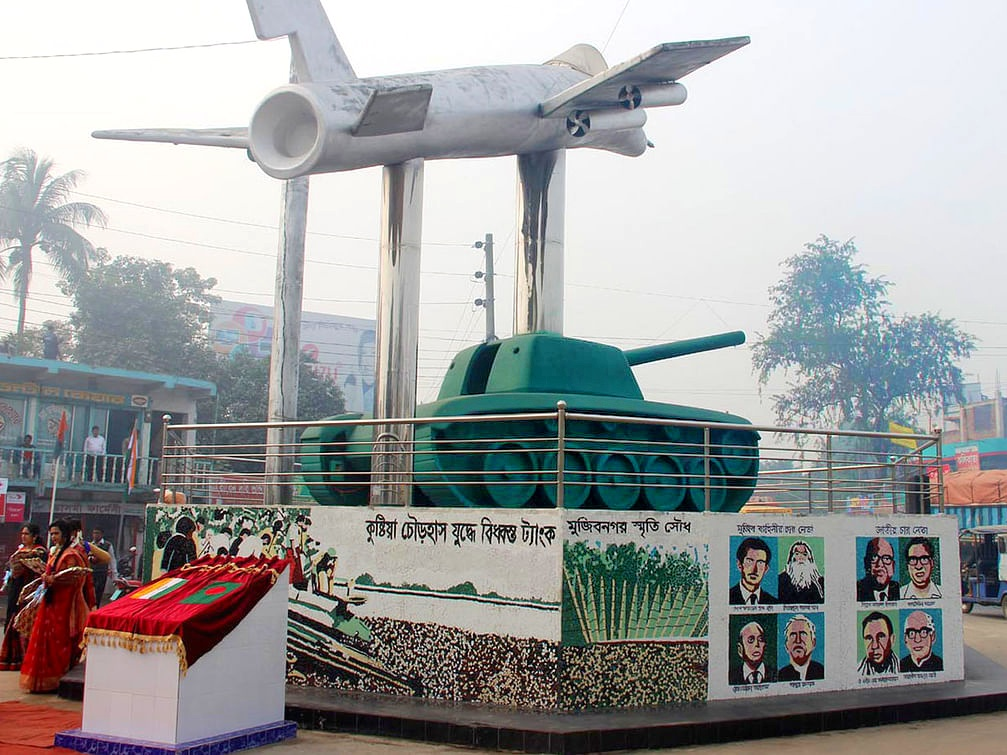
Mukti Maitree Memorial located at Chourhas intersection

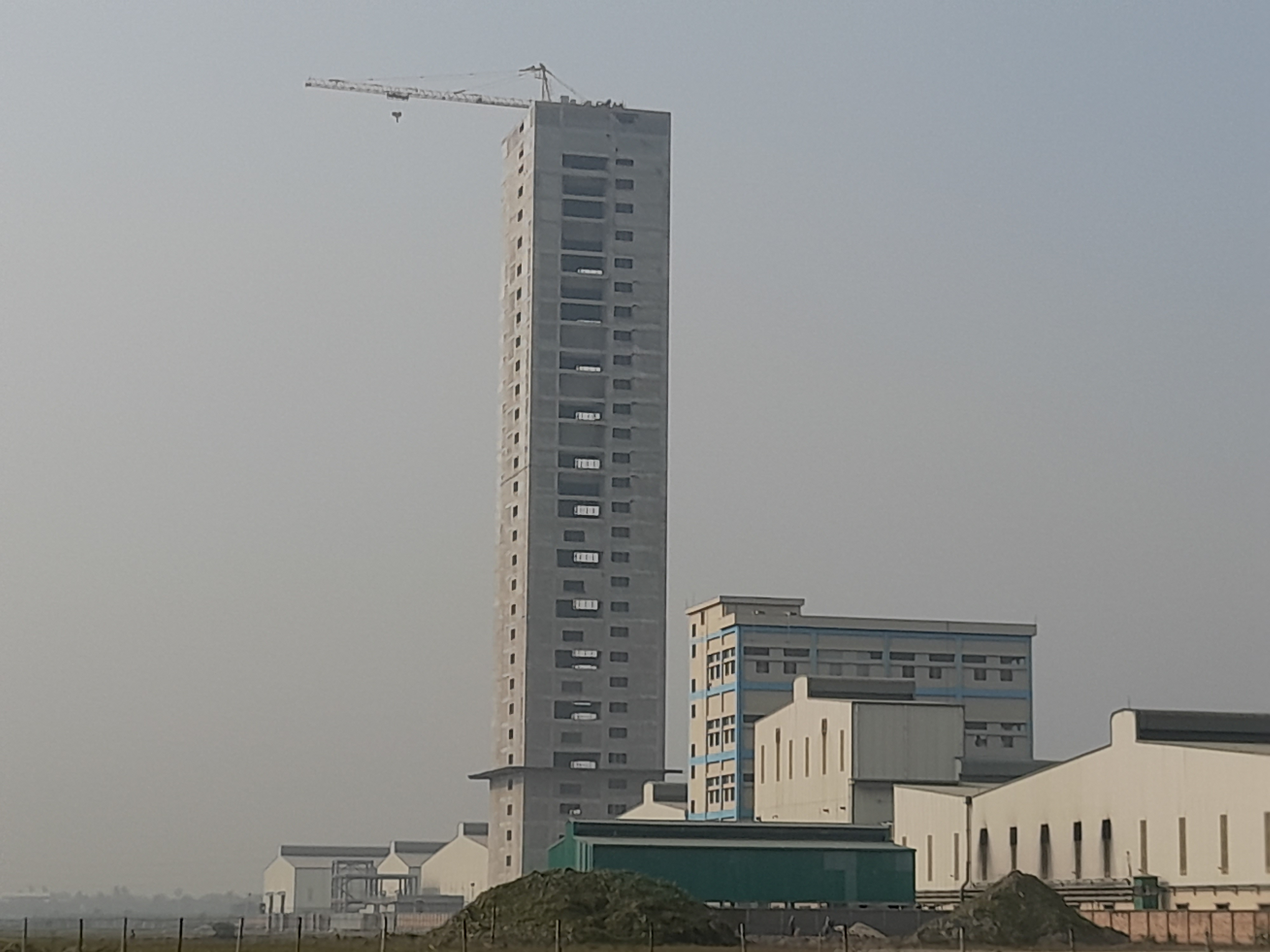
BRB Cable Tower (under construction)

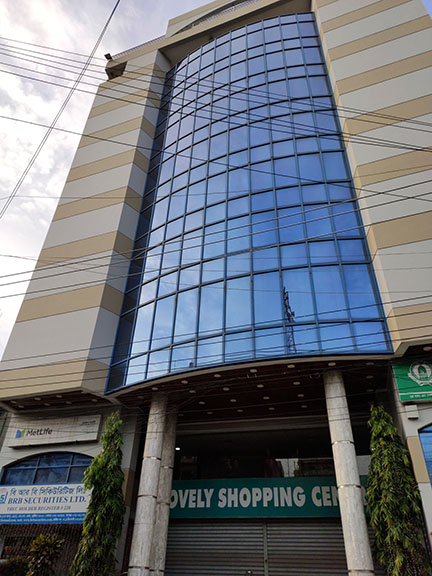
The first high-rise building in Kushtia, built in 1999. It is the first modern shopping mall in Khulna Division.

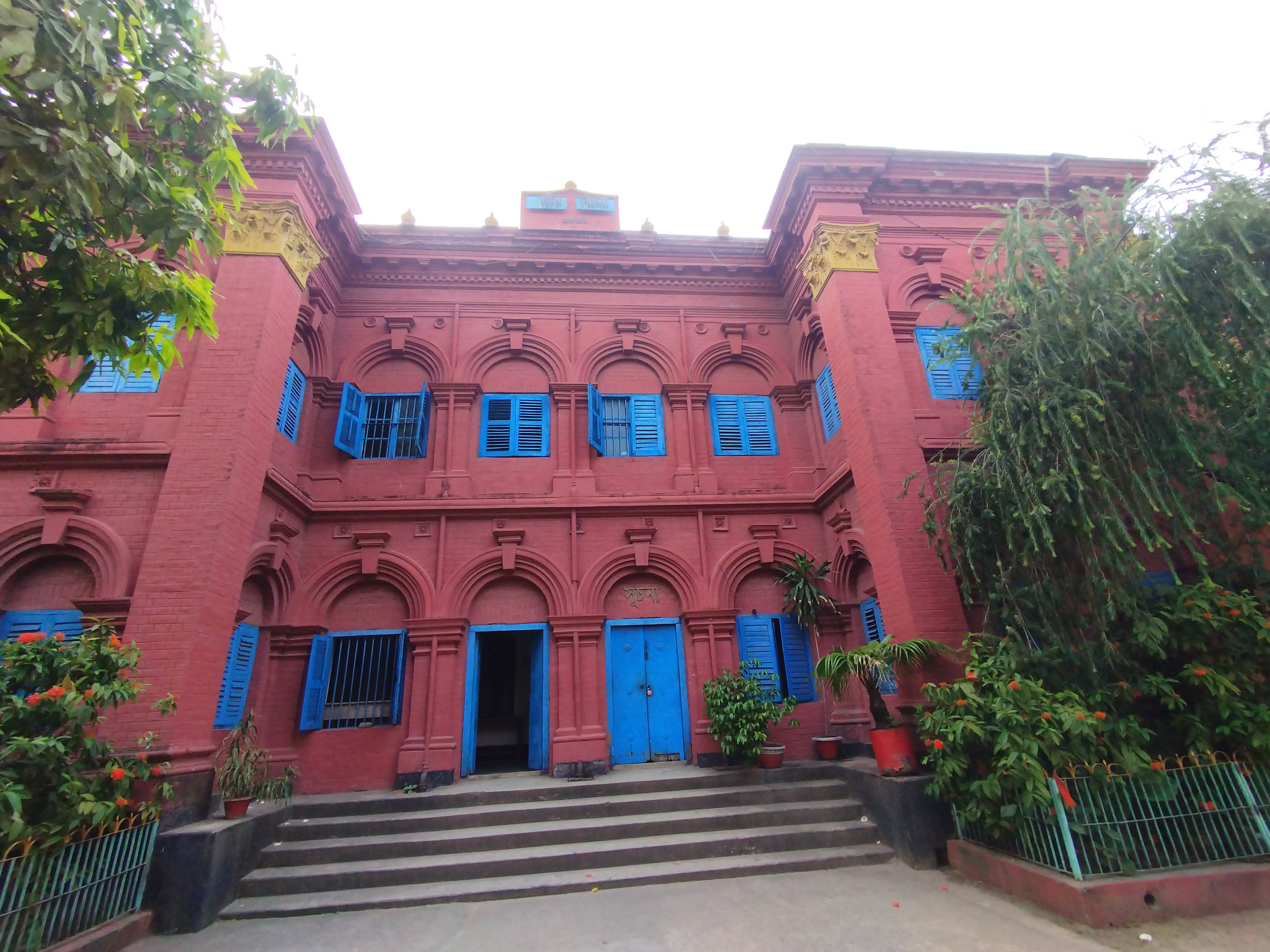
Front view of Kushtia Municipal Building

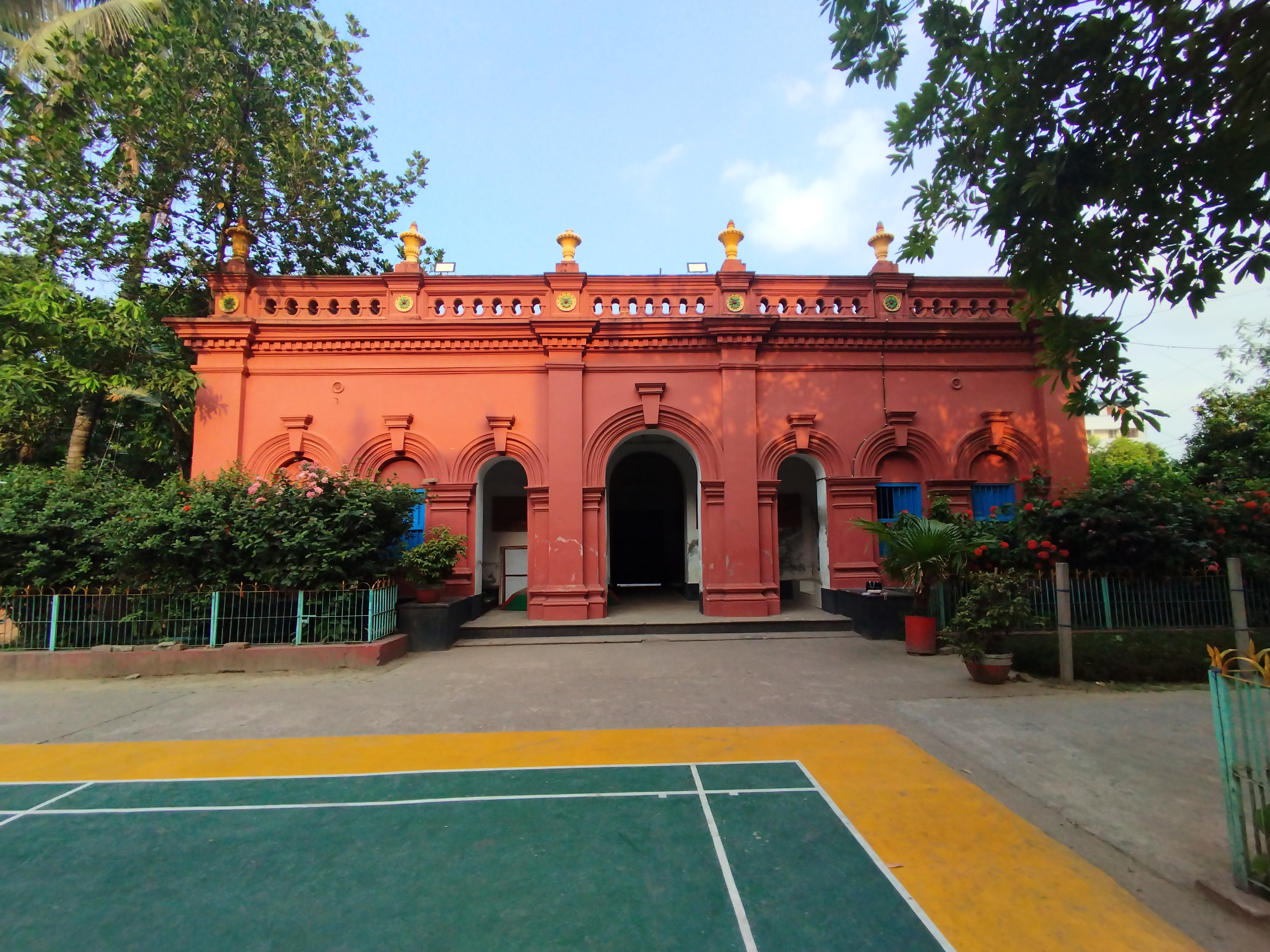
Kushtia Municipal Museum

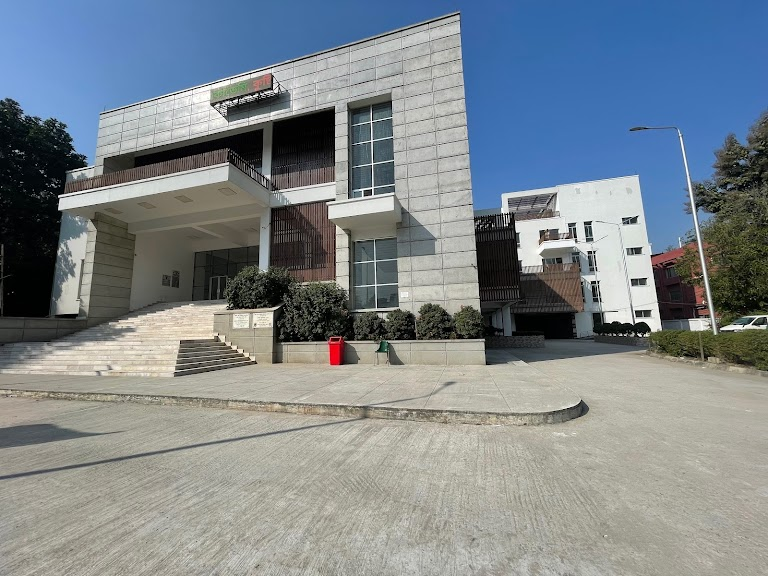
Kushtia Zilla Shilpakala Academy

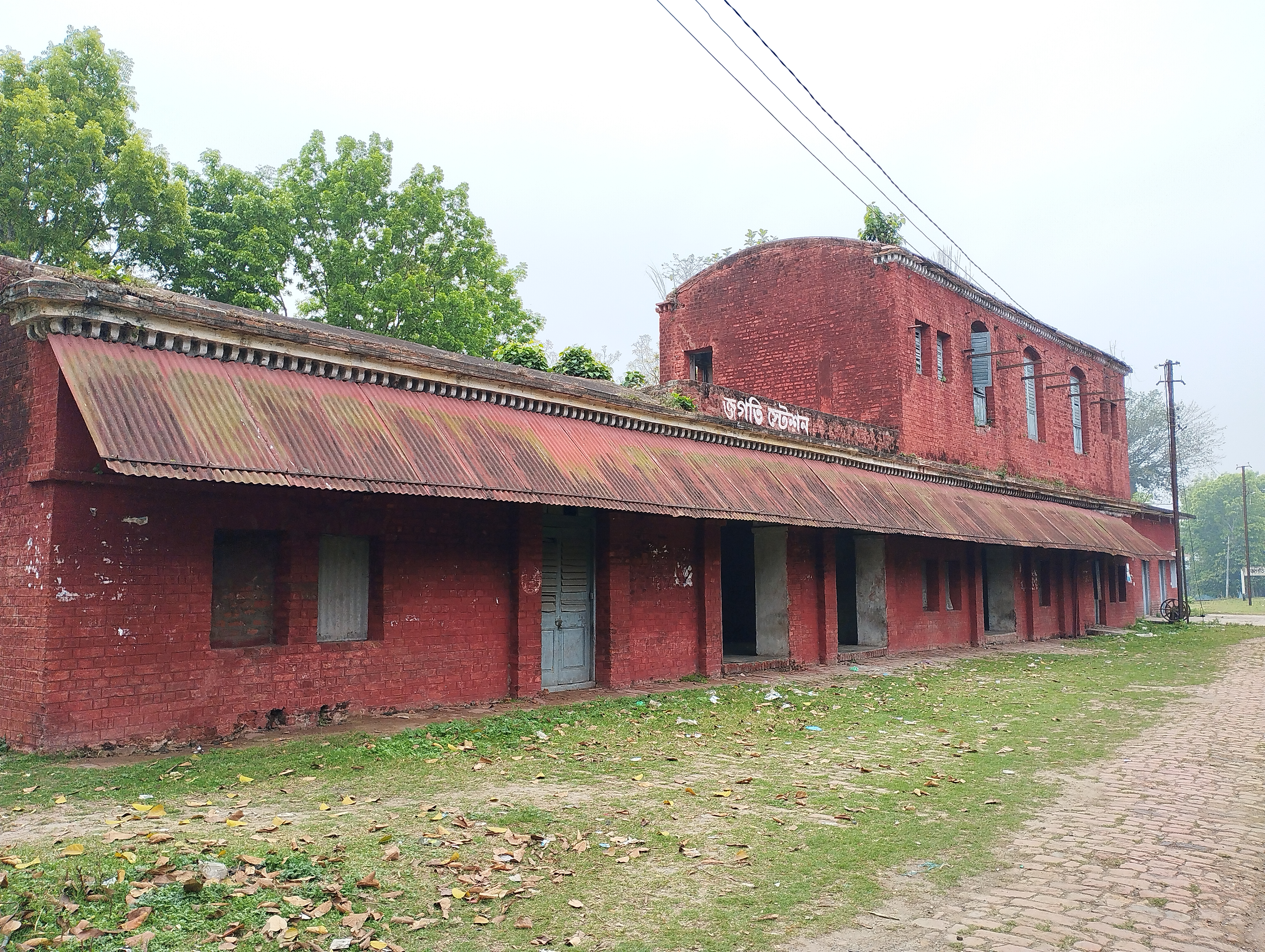
Jagati railway station (March 2024)

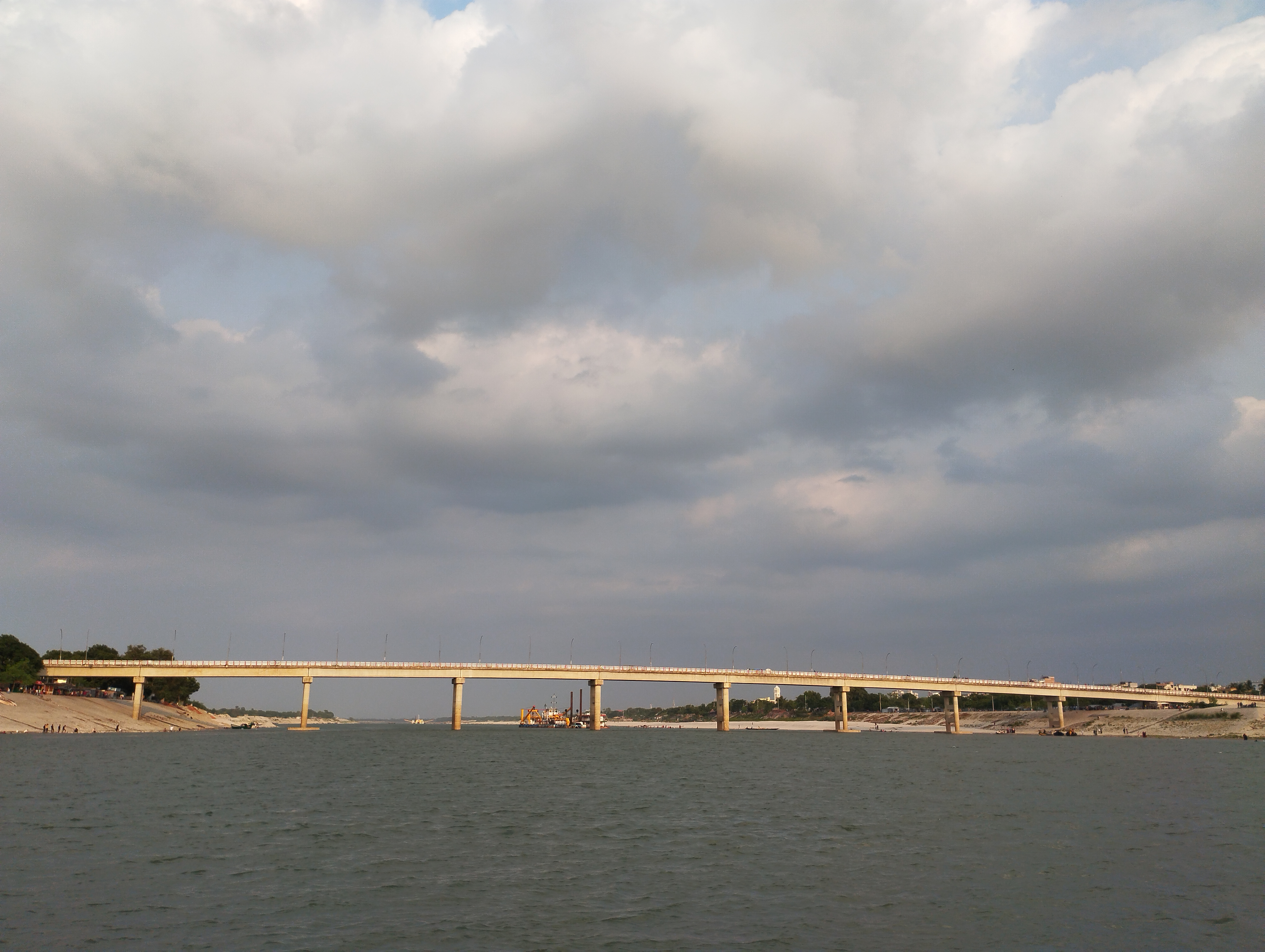
Bridge connecting Kushtia and Old Kushtia (Haripur Bridge)

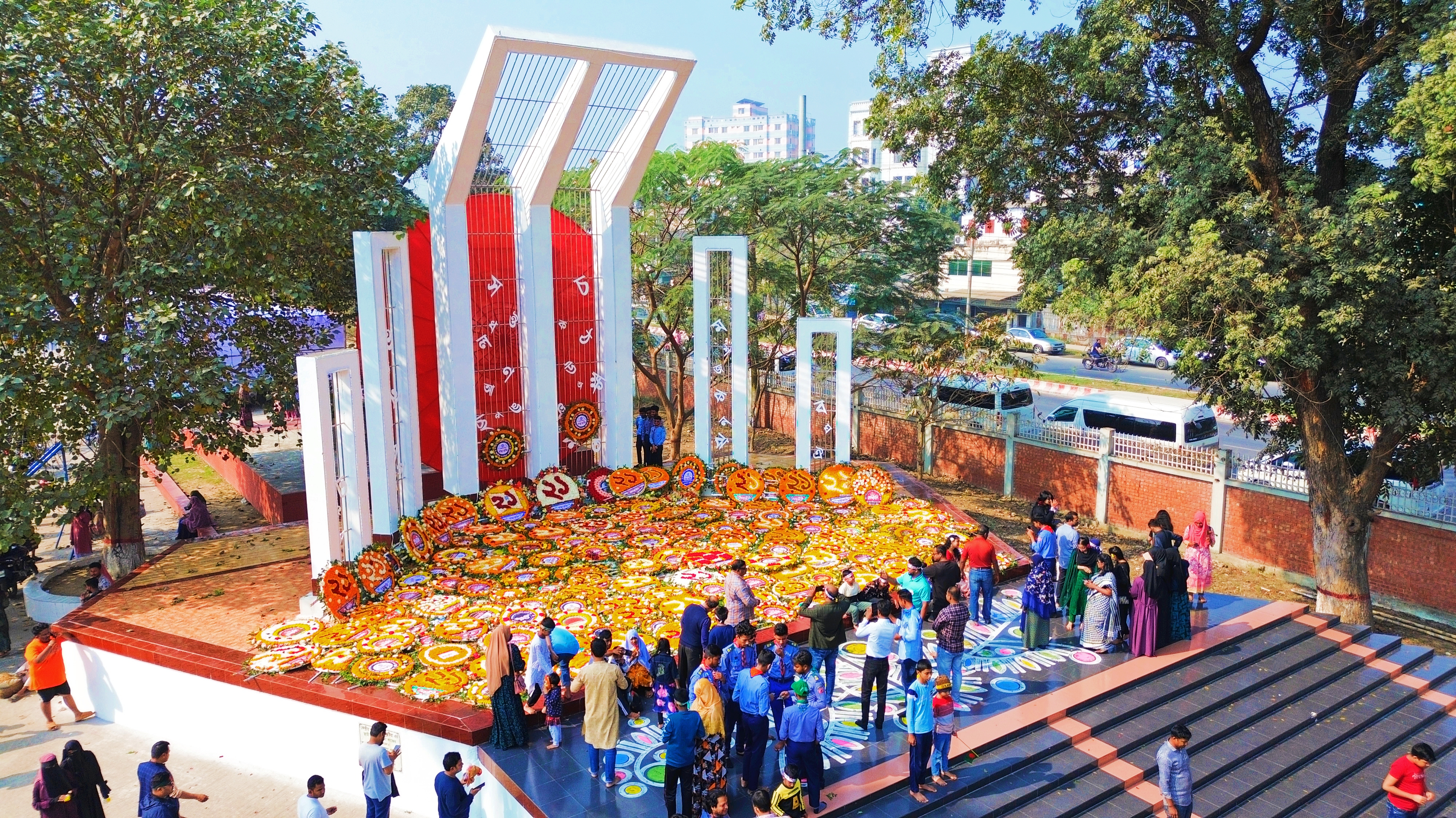
Kushtia Central Shaheed Minar on 21 February 2025

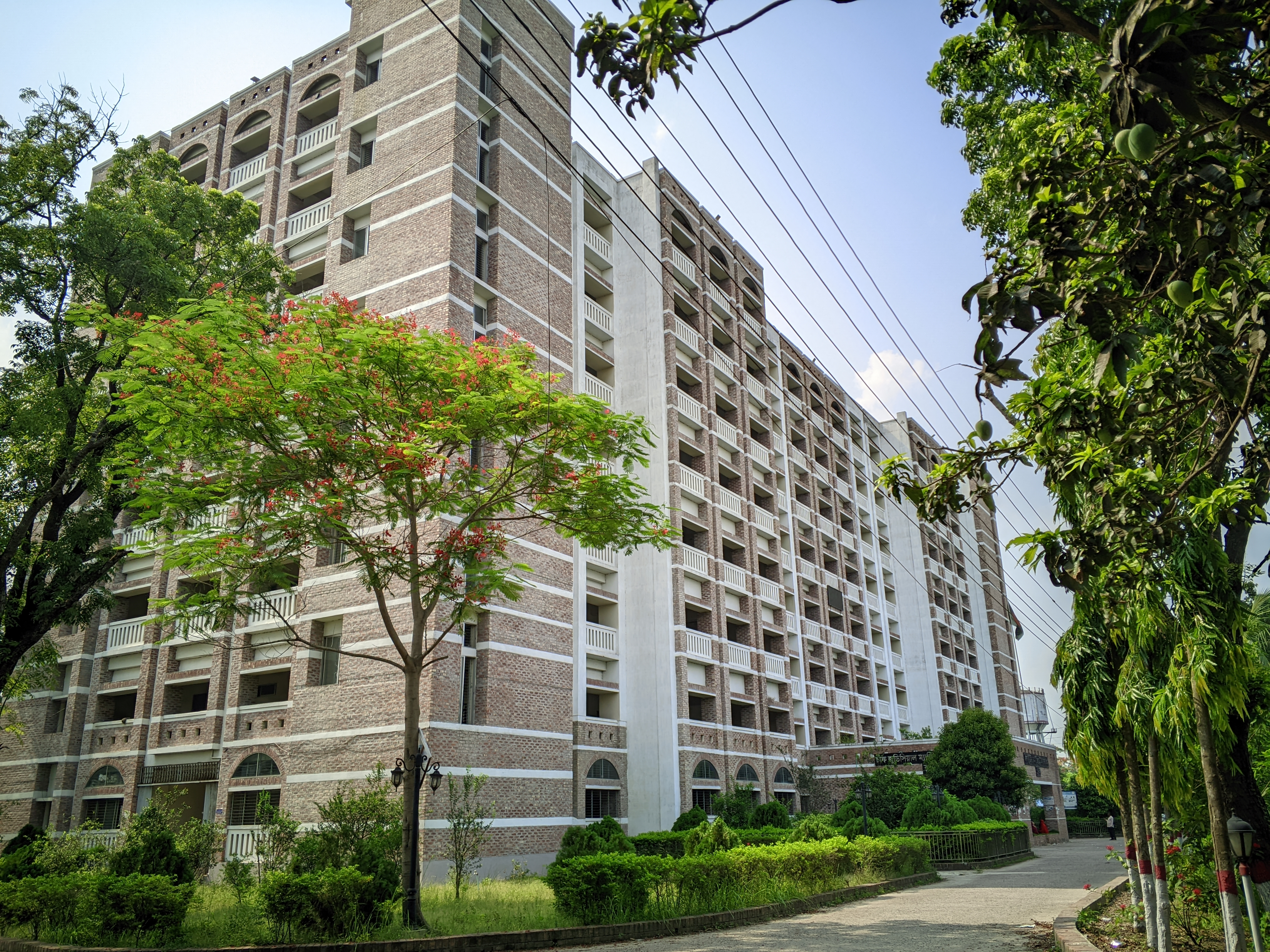
Chief Judicial Magistrate Court, Kushtia
