= Kushtia central bus terminal =

Kushtia pauro central bus terminal Kushtia central bus terminal কুষ্টিয়া পৌর কেন্দ্রীয় বাস টার্মিনাল কুষ্টিয়া কেন্দ্রীয় বাস টার্মিনাল

General information
- Other names: Chorhash Bus Terminal
- Location: Kushtia–Dhaka Highway; Kushtia; Bangladesh
- Coordinates: 23.8908°N 89.1168°E
- System: Bus station
- Owner: Kushtia Municipality

Construction
- Parking: Yes
- Cycle facilities: No
- Accessible: Yes

History
- Opened: 1999; 27 years ago
Location

Kushtia pauro central bus terminal (Bengali: কুষ্টিয়া পৌর কেন্দ্রীয় বাস টার্মিনাল) is a bus terminal located in Kushtia city. The terminal was constructed in 1999 at the initiative of Kushtia Municipality. It is also known as Chorhash Bus Terminal.

== Location ==
The bus terminal is located along the R710 Regional Highway in Adarshapara area of Chorhash in Kushtia. The distance of the terminal from Majampur (an important center of city) is 3.1 km.

- There is unused land on the east side
- On the west side are –
  - Kushtia Passport Office
  - Office of Anti-Corruption Commission, Kushtia
  - Kushtia District Government Library
- To the south is the Technical Training Centre
- Part of Adarshpara in the north

== Infrastructure ==
The total area of the terminal is about 8 acres (32,000 m2 ). The main building of the terminal is single storey. There are 3 main roads to the south and 2 connecting roads to the north for access and exit to the terminal. There is a public toilet on the east-south side of the main building.

platform

There are platforms on all sides of the building except the south side. There is also a 120m long platform on the north side.
