= Gorai Canal =

Canal in Kushtia, Bangladesh

Gorai Canal গড়াই খাল
- Location: Kushtia
- Country: Bangladesh

Specifications
- Length: 8.5 km (5.3 miles)

History
- Date completed: 1949; 76 years ago

Geography
- Beginning coordinates: 23.916598°N 89.120233°E
- Ending coordinates: 23.906112°N 89.069809°E

Gorai Canal (Bengali: গড়াই খাল) is a canal that flows through Kushtia, Bangladesh. It was excavated in 1949. The canal was constructed to benefit the residents of Kushtia Municipality, alleviate waterlogging in some agricultural lands of Mirpur Upazila, and expand the local waterways.

== Route ==
The canal originates from the Gorai River and enters Kushtia through Mongalbaria and Kamalapur in the Kushtia Municipality. It stretches approximately 8.5 kilometres (5.3 mi), passing through Kamalapur, Mongalbaria Bazar, Udibari, Baradi, Mandirpara in Chourhash, Chechuya, Phulbaria, Jagati, and bypass, before reaching Minapara.

== Problems ==
Encroachment

The canal has been encroached upon due to prolonged disregard for the River Commission's regulations, excuses made in the name of development, negligence, and the shortsightedness of government offices.

== Development Project ==
In 2018, the Kushtia Municipality authorities initiated a project with a budget of 23.8 million Bangladeshi Taka. The project included plans for dredging the canal, constructing walkways on both sides, planting trees, and facilitating fish and duck farming in the canal's water. However, due to a lack of proper planning, contractor negligence, and various other issues, the project was not implemented.
