= Renwick Jajneswar & Co Limited =

- Formation: 1881
- Headquarters: Dhaka, Bangladesh
- Location: Kushtia (Factory)
- Region served: Bangladesh
- Official language: Bengali
- Parent organization: Bangladesh Sugar and Food Industries Corporation

Renwick Jajneswar & Co Limited (Bengali: রেনউইক যজ্ঞেশ্বর অ্যান্ড কোম্পানি) is a Bangladesh government owned company that manufactures machines and parts for sugar mills.

== History ==
Renwick Jajneswar & Co Limited was established in 1881. It is located on a 37-acre site in Kushtia.

Renwick Jajneswar & Co Limited was delisted from the Dhaka Stock Exchange briefly after delays with converting paper shares into electronic shares.

Renwick Jajneswar & Co Limited had been operating in a deficit and by January 2019 it had been months since workers were paid at the company. It switched from buying scrap metals from state owned sugar mills to a private contractor, Azam & Sons, increasing the cost of raw materials. According to Dhaka Tribune there is a strong syndicate involved in embezzling funds from the company. The newspaper reported that the syndicate is controlled by accountants, Alamgir Hossain and Partha Pratim Saha, of the company.

The government of Bangladesh owns 51% of the shareholders while the rest are held by the general public. The public shareholders do not have a director on the Board of Directors representing their interests. BRB cables has bought 26.89% of the shares of the company from the stock market. According to Dhaka Stock Exchange 17.38% of the shares was owned by institutional investors and the remaining 31.62% by general shareholders. BRB cables hoped to place a director on the company board. It was the second state owned company, after Eastern Cables Limited, in which BRB cables bought significant number of shares.

Bangladesh Sugar and Food Industries Corporation, a state owned corporation, owned sugars mills owed half a billion taka to Renwick Jajneswar & Co Limited in November 2019. An audit report stated that the company was at risk of closure unless it could collect the debts from state owned sugar mills.
