= Big Bazar, Kushtia =

Big Bazar
- বড় বাজার
- Location: Kushtia, Bangladesh
- Coordinates: 23.905152°N 89.141374°E
- Management: Bara Bazar Business Association

Big Bazar (বড় বাজার) is the main commercial hub of Kushtia city. A traditional market called 'Rajar Hat' is held here twice a week. This market is over two hundred years old. During the British colonial period, the market developed around Rajar Hat, Mohini Mills, Tagore Lodge, and the Kushtia railway station.

Kuwatul Islam Kamil Madrasa and Syed Masud Rumi Degree College are located in the Bara Bazar area.

Every year, during the Rath Yatra of the Hindu community a fair is held along NS Road within Bara Bazar. This Rath Yatra has been held since 1905. The Gopinath Jiu Temple committee organizes the fair annually.

== Location ==
Location of Big Bazar in Kushtia city

Big Bazar is formed from parts of the Amlapara, Aruyapara, and Millpara neighborhoods of Kushtia city. It is located on the bank of the Gorai River at the eastern end of NS Road. The Kushtia railway station is situated in the Millpara area of Bara Bazar, and is also popularly known as the 'Bara Bazar Railway Station'.

== Gallery ==
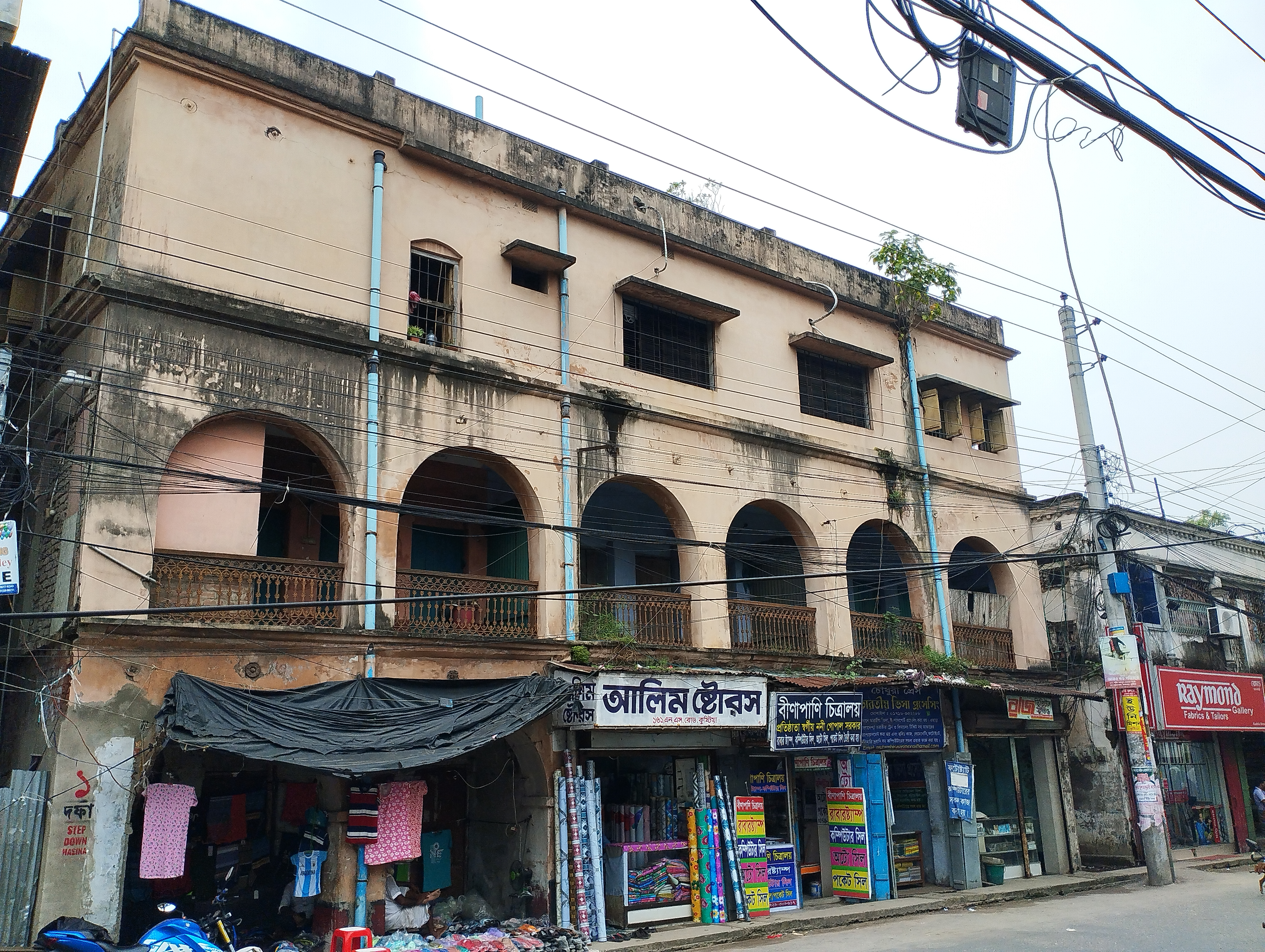
Old building from the British era

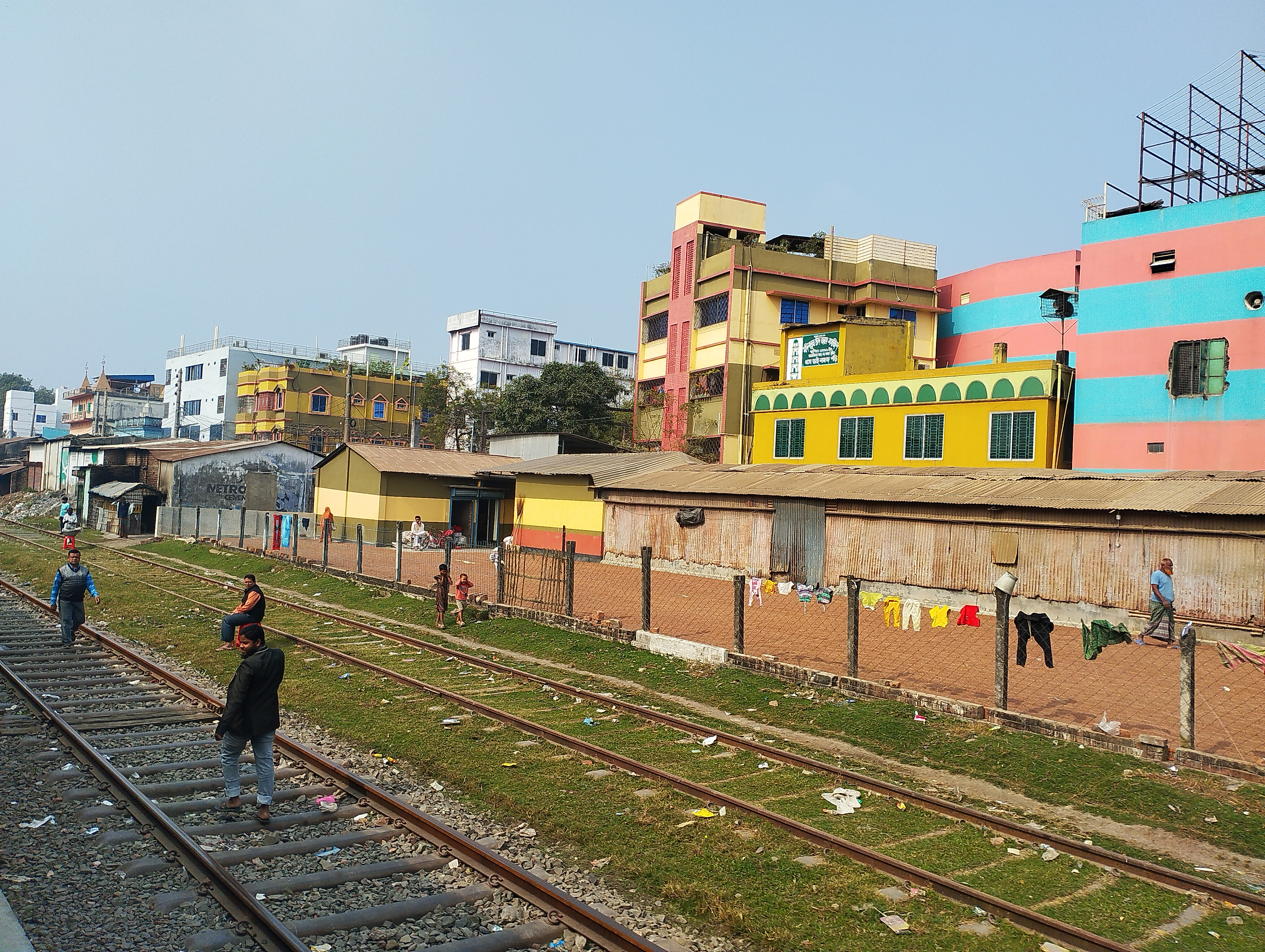
Various buildings in Bara Bazar near the Kushtia railway station

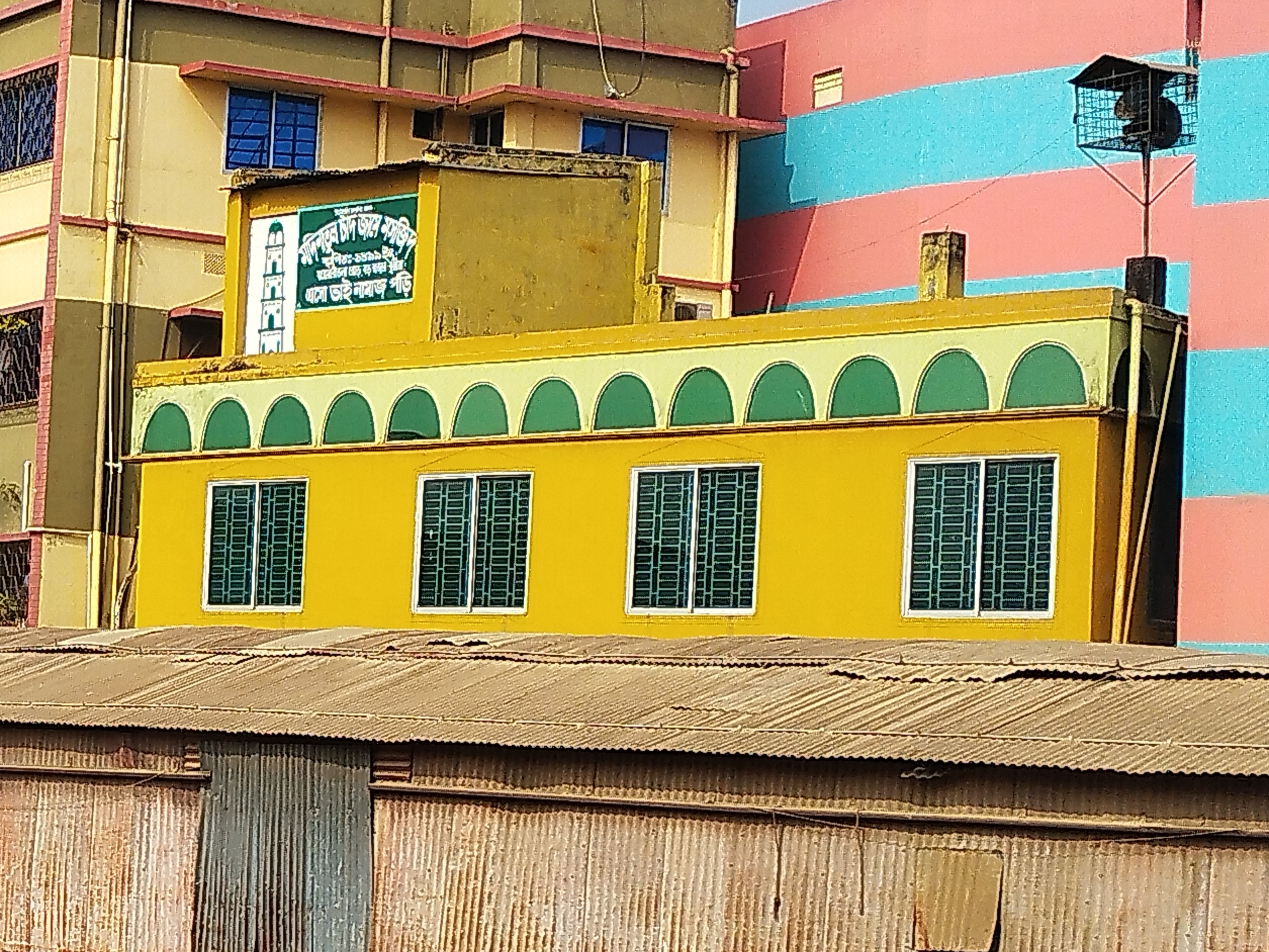
'Madinatul Chand Jame Mosque' established in 1899

== External ==
- Media related to Big Bazar, Kushtia at Wikimedia Commons
