= Kushtia Municipal Building =

- কুষ্টিয়া পৌর ভবন
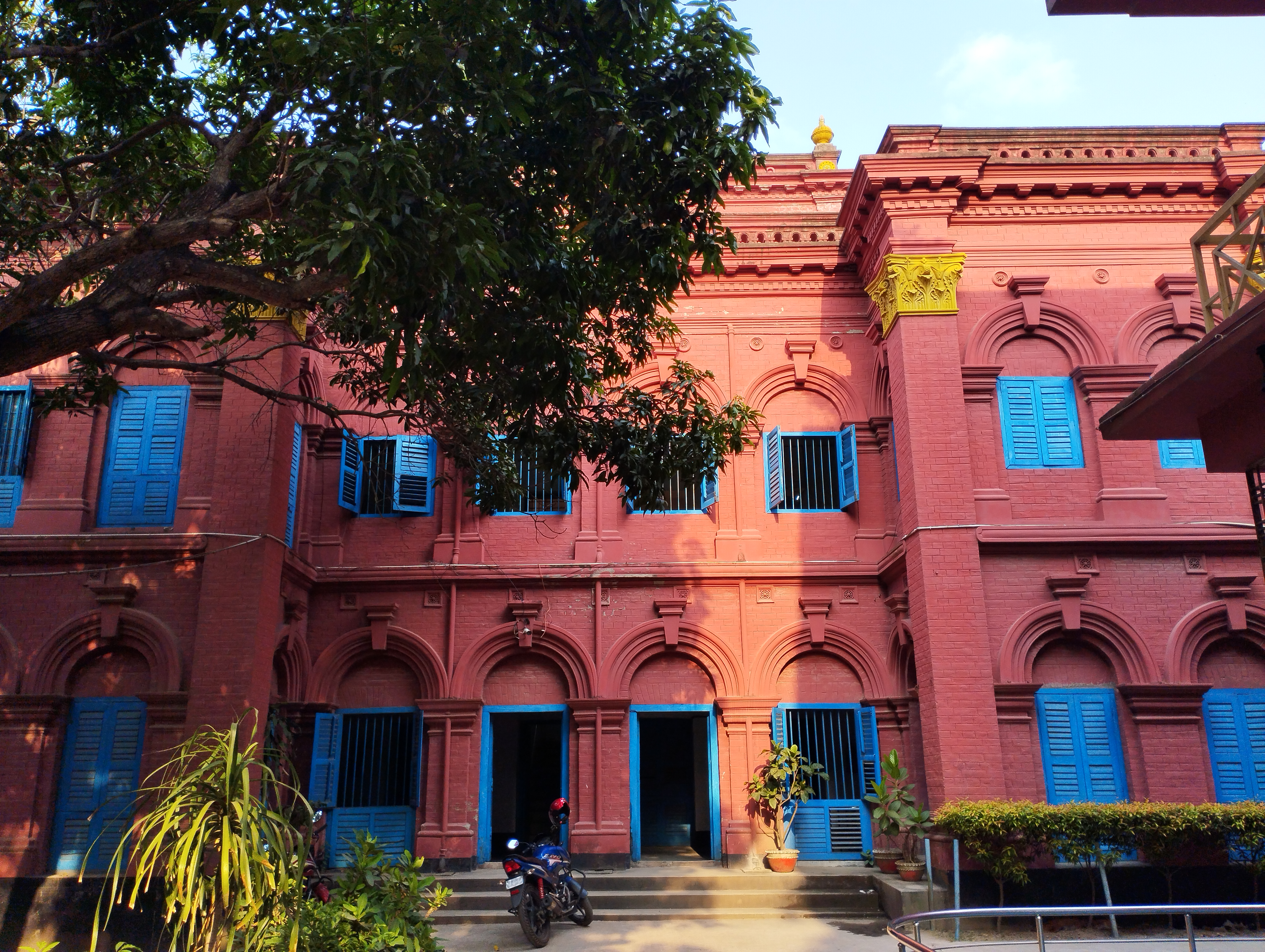
- Front side of Municipal Building
- Interactive map of the Kushtia Municipal Building area
- Former names: Zamindar house of Satish Saha

General information
- Architectural style: European architecture
- Location: Majampur, Kushtia, Bangladesh
- Coordinates: 23.9103796°N 89.1219930°E
- Owner: Kushtia Municipality

Technical details
- Floor count: 3

Other information
- Number of rooms: 12

Website
- municipality.kushtia.gov.bd

Kushtia Municipal Building or Kushtia Paur Bhavan (Bengali: কুষ্টিয়া পৌর ভবন) is a palatial building located in the Kushtia city. Earlier it was the zamindar house of Satish Saha. Since 1966, the building has been used as the office of the Kushtia Municipality.

== History ==
The municipal building was built in the European architectural style during the British period. Its exact year of construction is unknown. It was the house of Satish Saha, the zamindar of Kushtia. Since 1966 it has been used as the office of Kushtia Municipality.

== Structure ==
The building is a tall three-storied building built on a rectangular ground-plan in European architecture. The height of the building is 42 feet (13 m) and 62 feet (19 m) in length from north to south when viewed from east and west, the building looks like English letter 'H'. Bricks and tiles, lime-surki, plaster and kadi-barga have been used as construction materials. Above each door and window is a semicircular arch with four tiers of geometric proportions. Windows and doors have wooden shutters. The walls of the building are more than two feet thick and the corners are carved. There are total 12 rooms in the building.

== Gallery ==
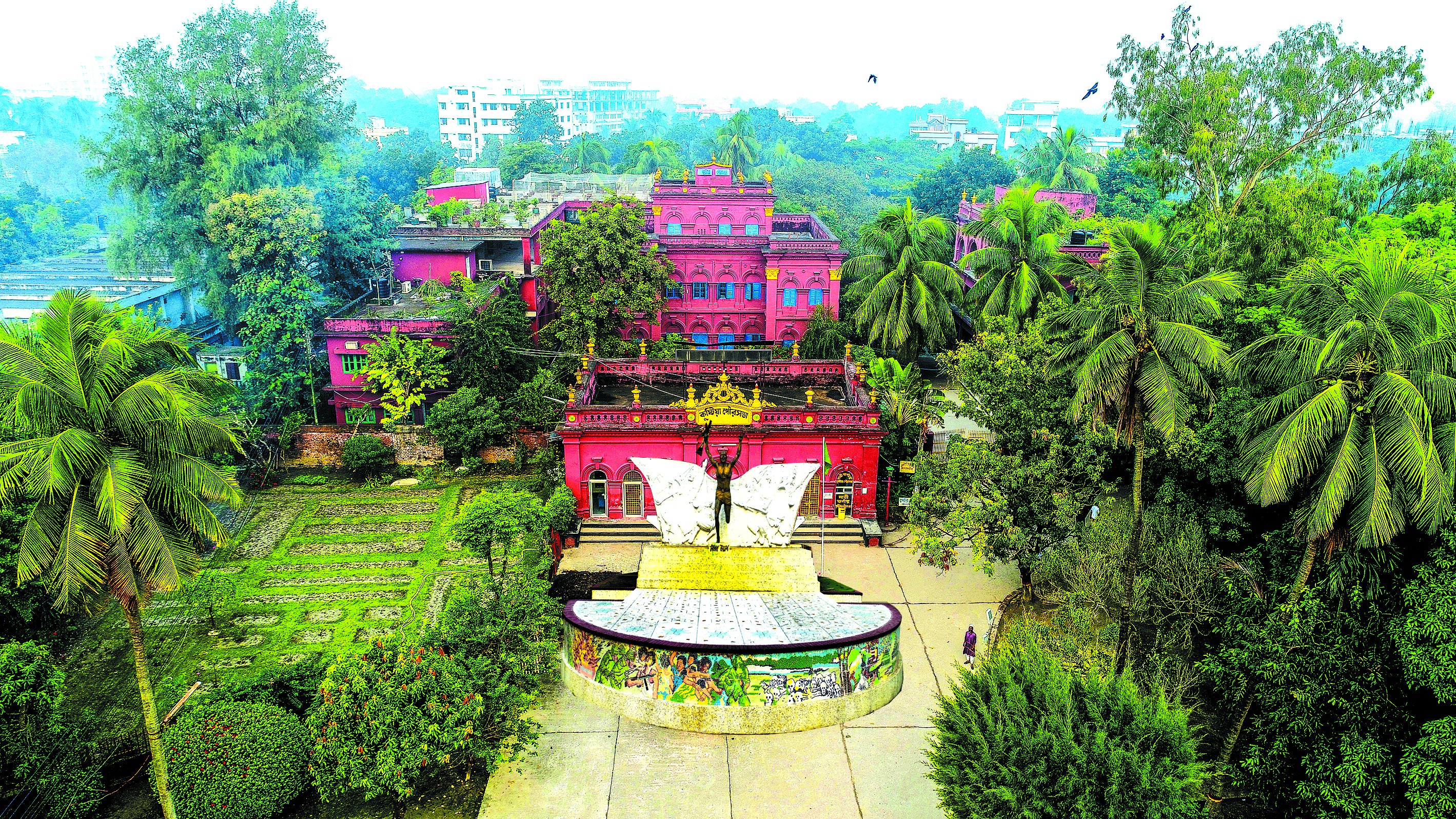

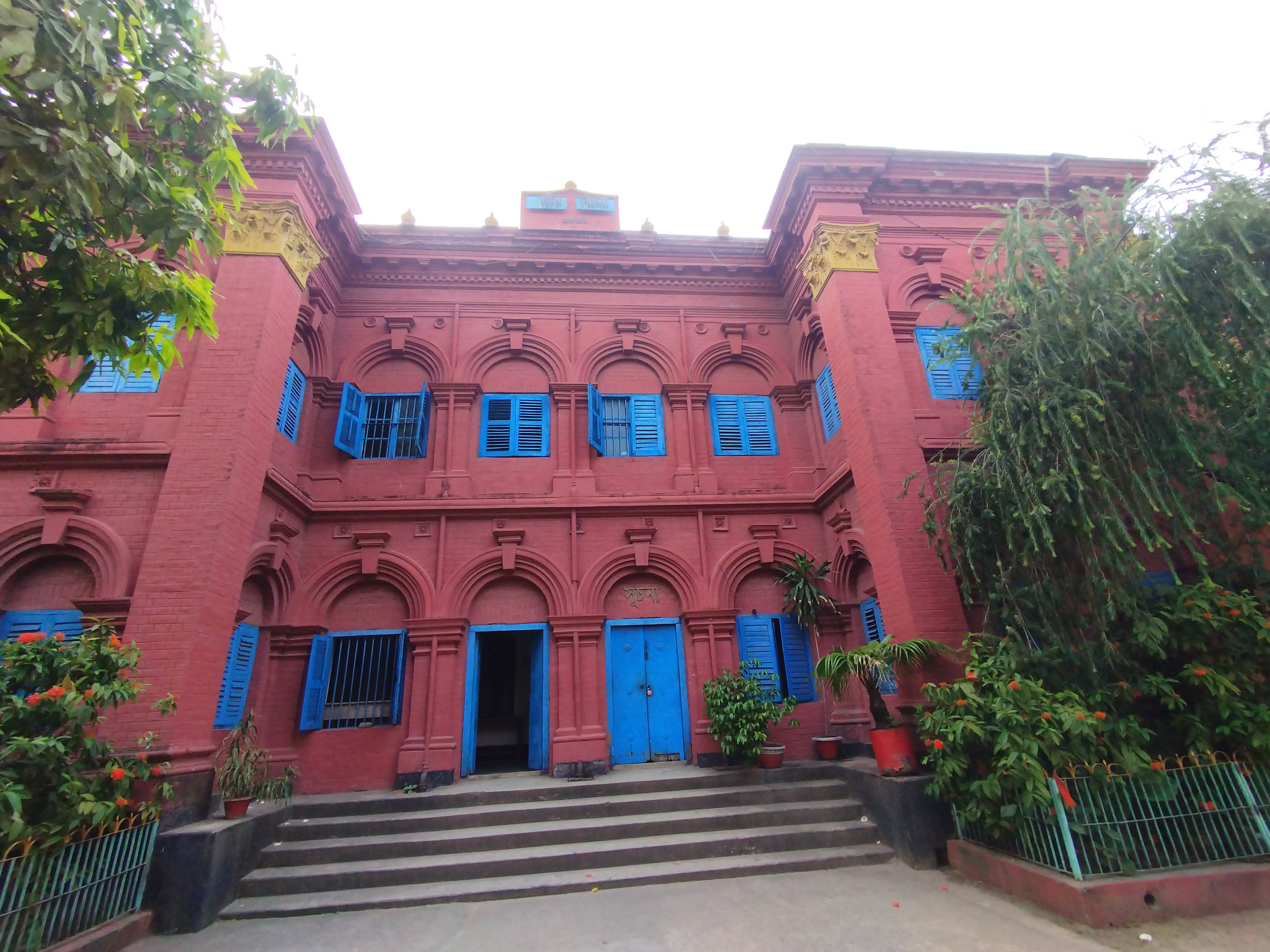

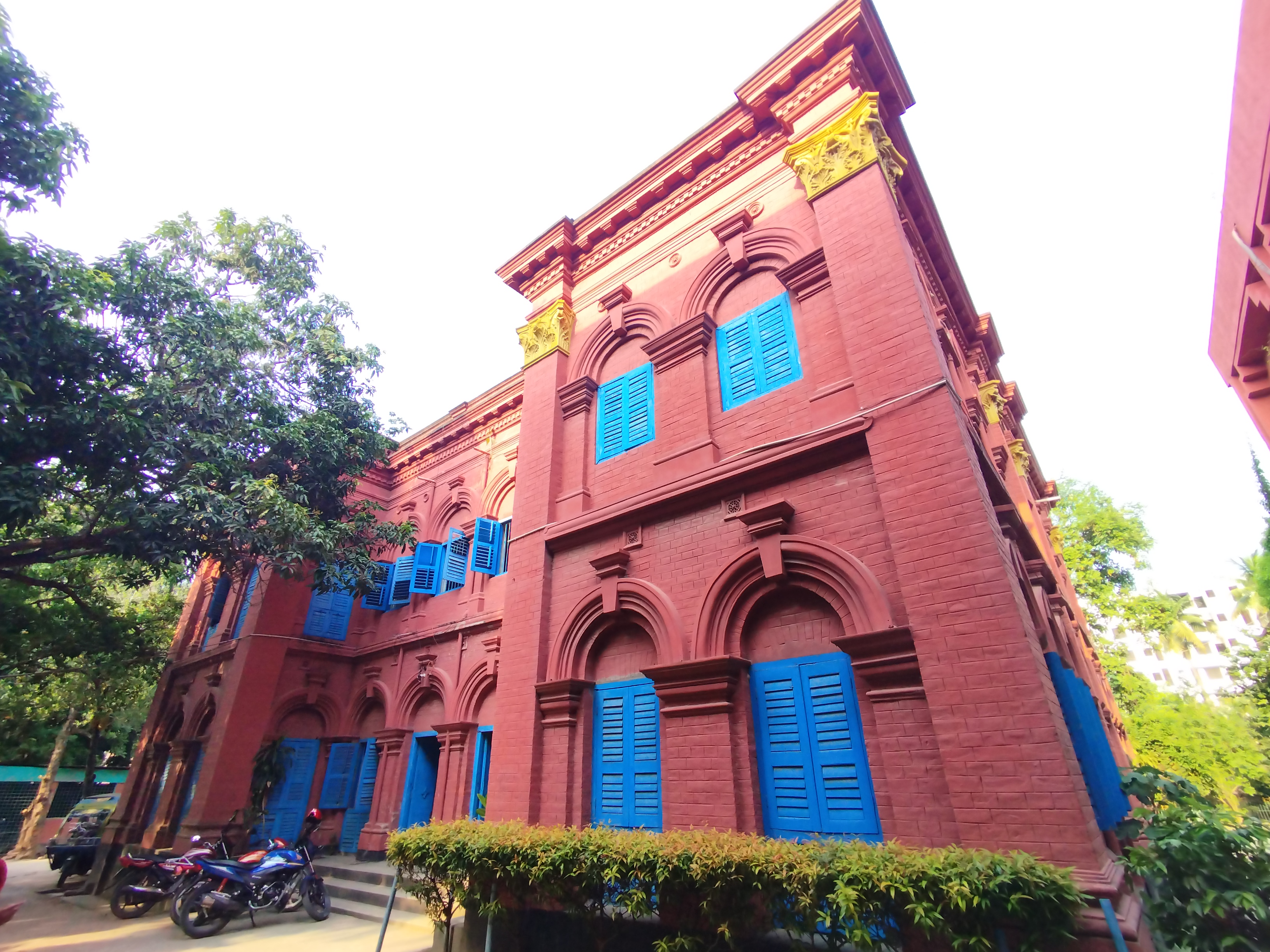

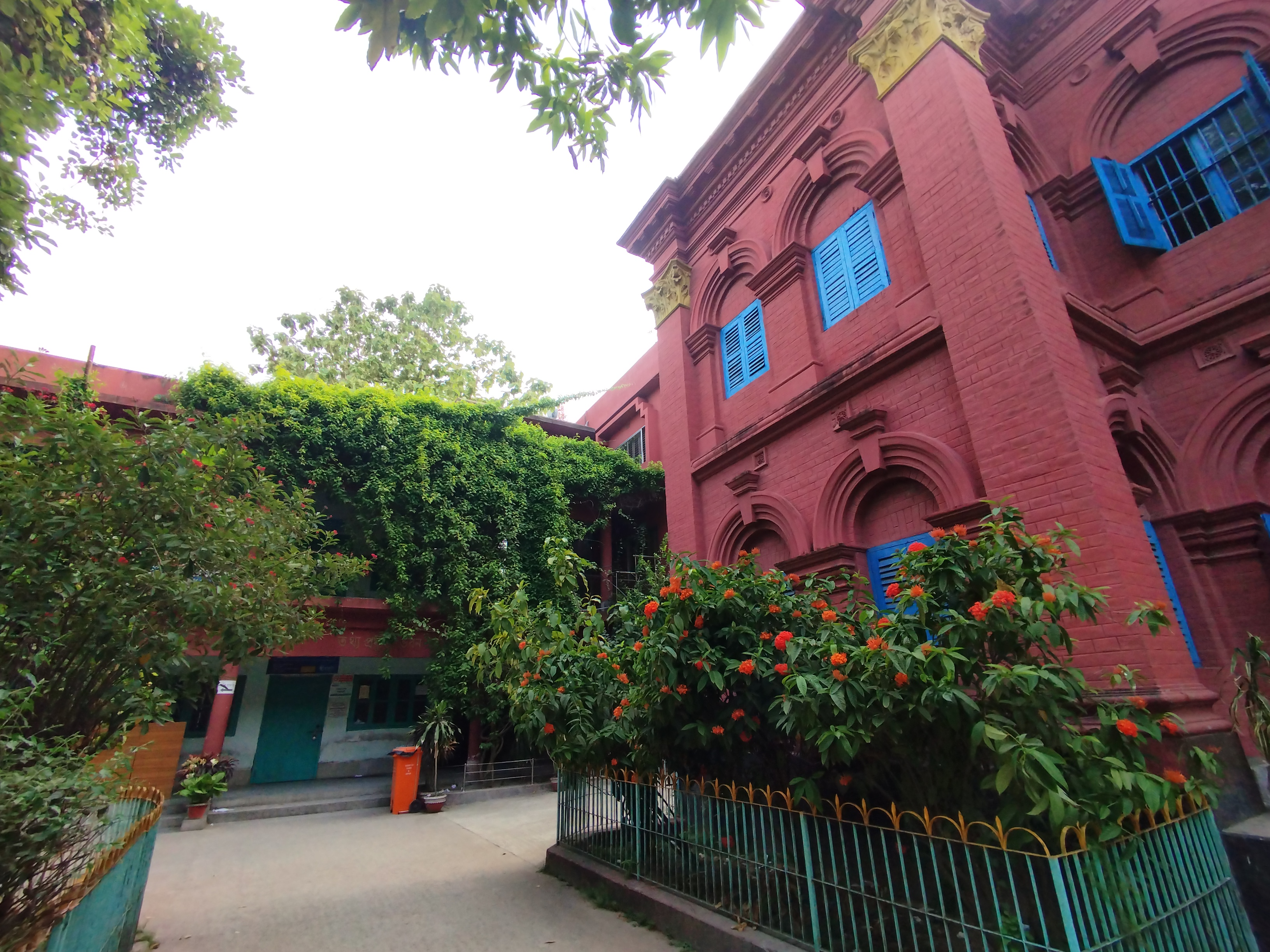

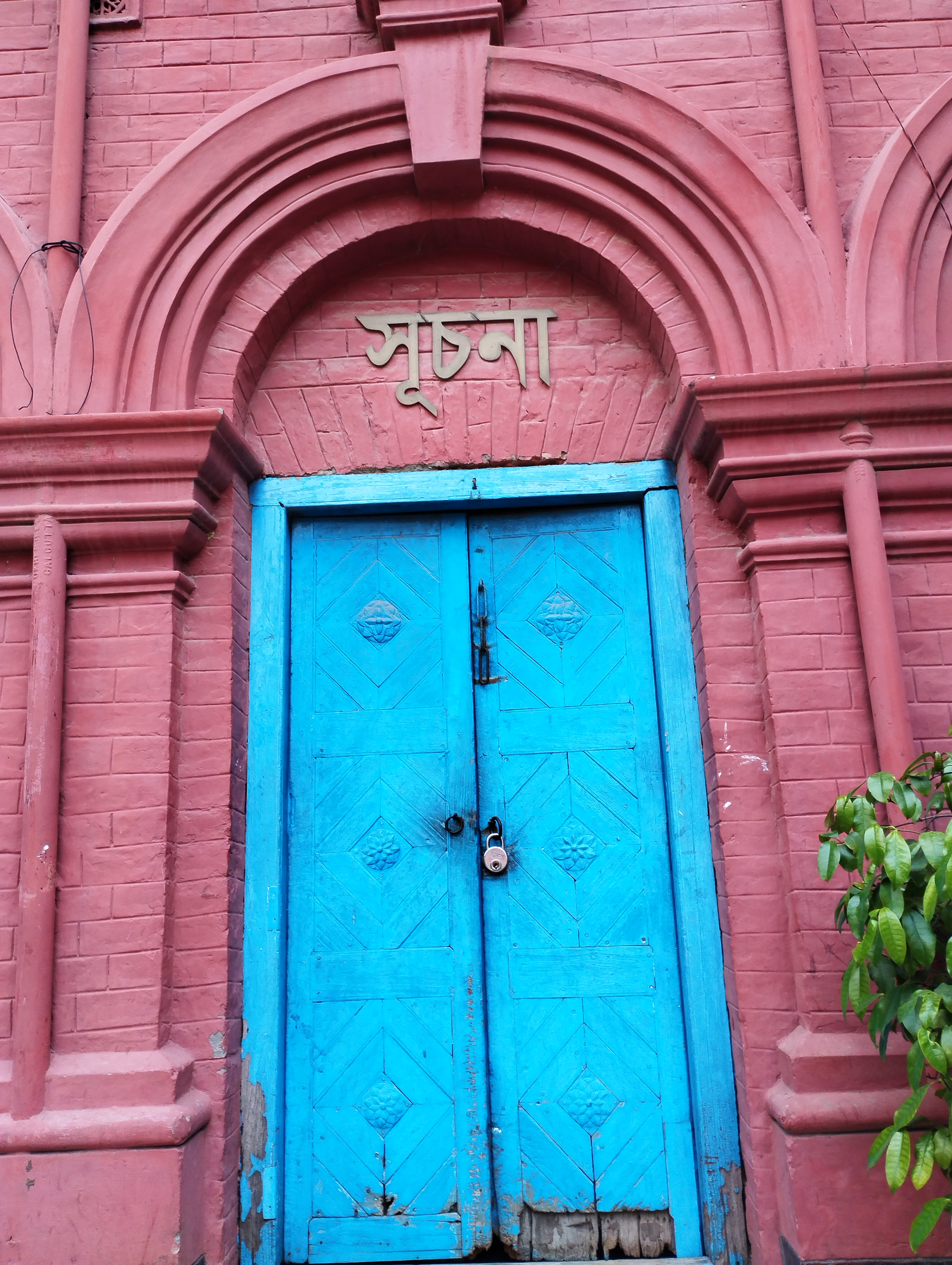

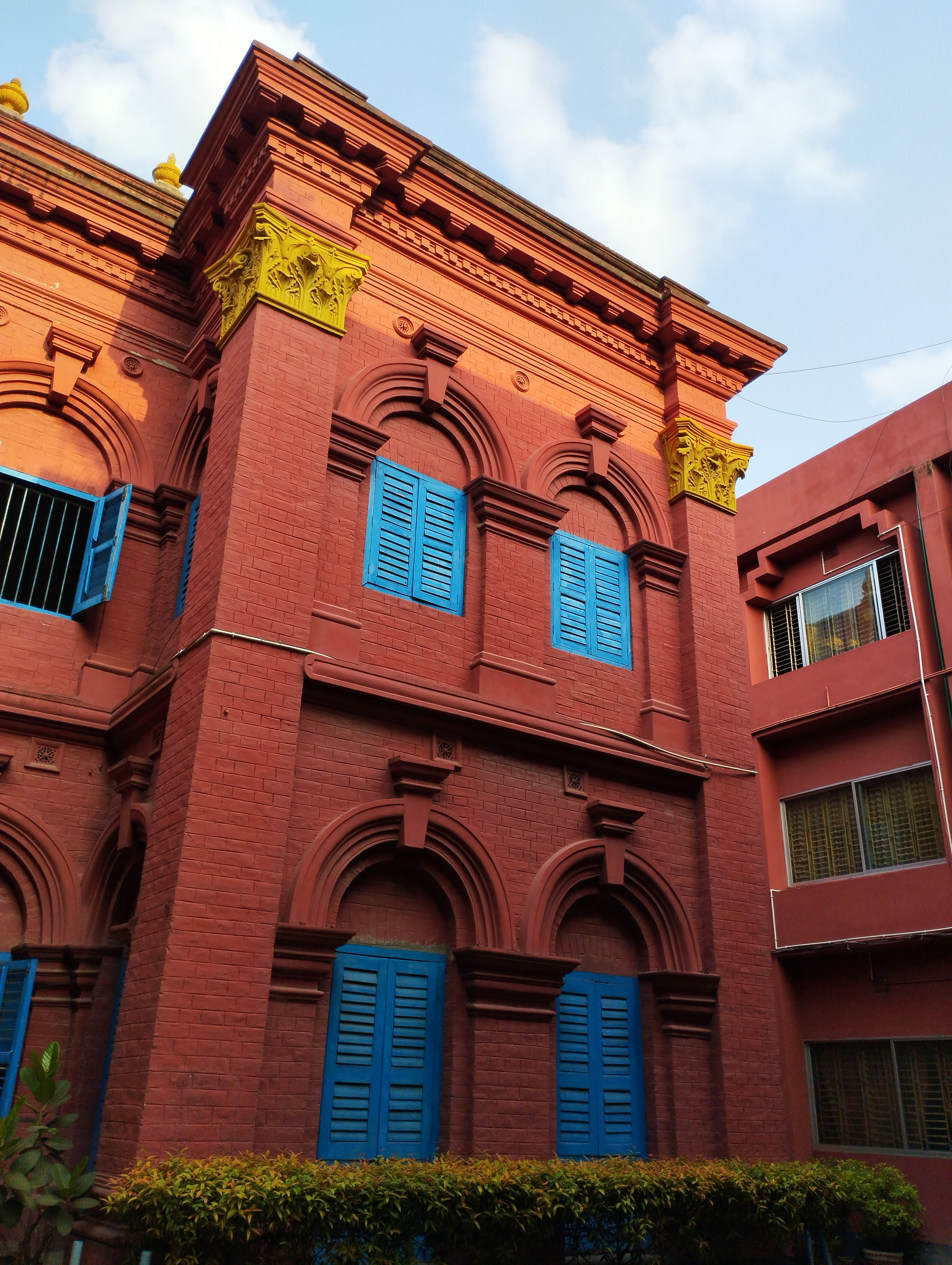

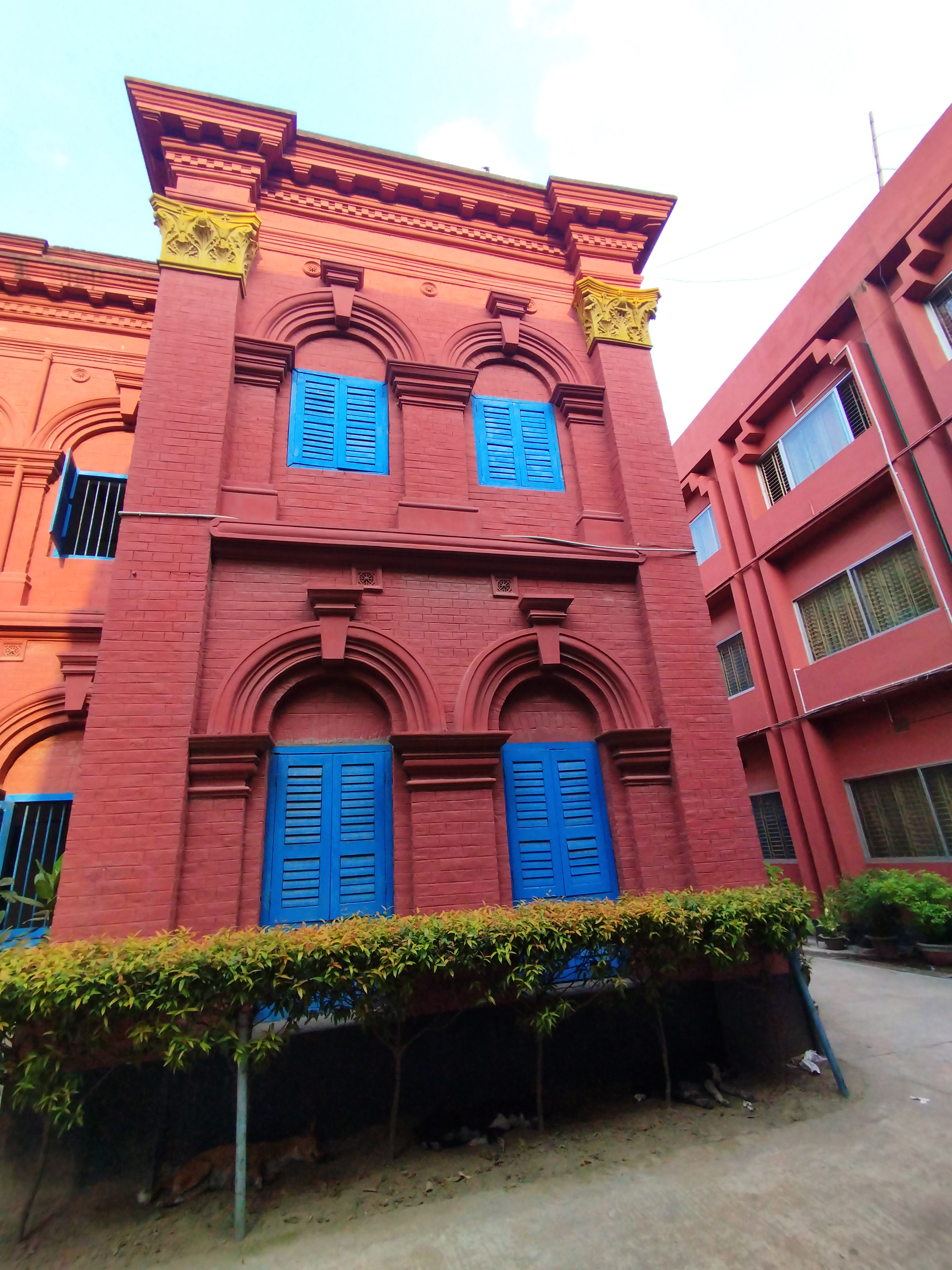

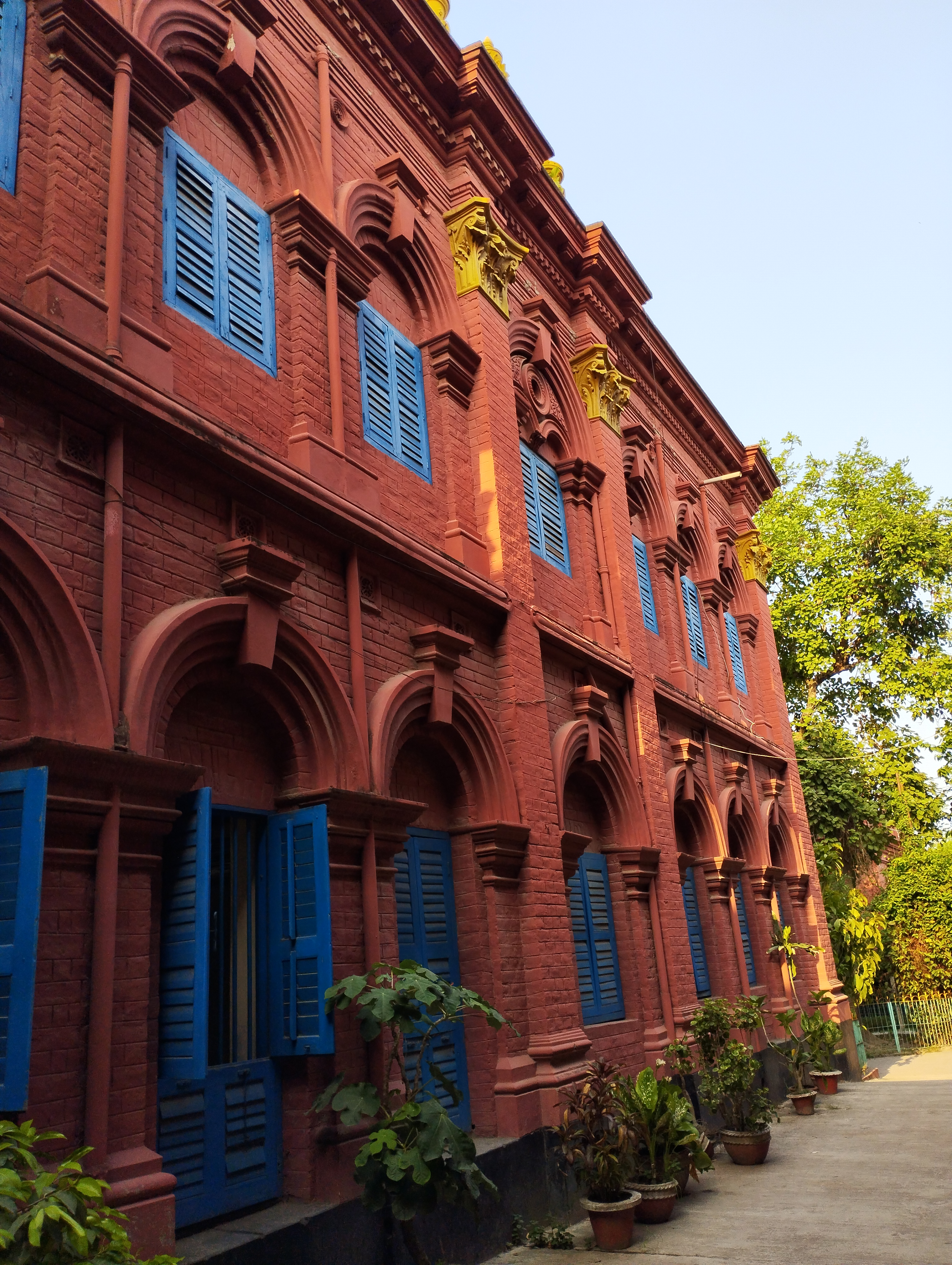
