= Kushtia Medical College =

Medical school in Kushtia, Bangladesh

- কুষ্টিয়া মেডিকেল কলেজ
- Other name: KuMC/কুষমেক
- Type: Public medical college
- Established: 9 October 2011 (14 years ago)
- Academic affiliations: University of Rajshahi, Khulna Medical University
- Principal: Mohammad Mahbubur Rahman Khan
- Academic staff: 60 (2017)
- Administrative staff: 20
- Students: 305
- Location: Kushtia, Khulna, Bangladesh; 23.9009°N 89.1233°E
- Campus: Urban
- Language: English
- Website: https://www.kumc.edu.bd/

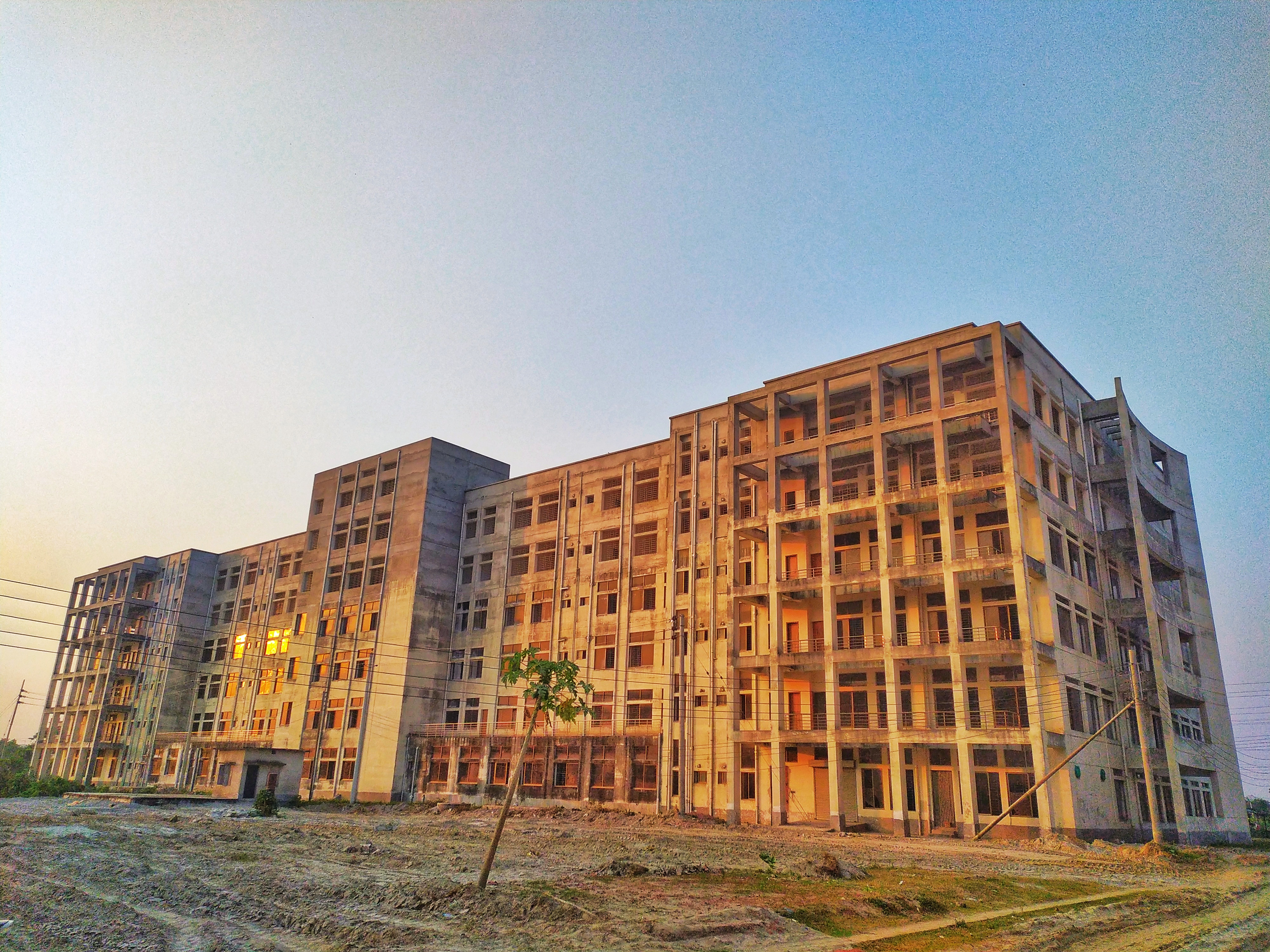
Kushtia Medical College

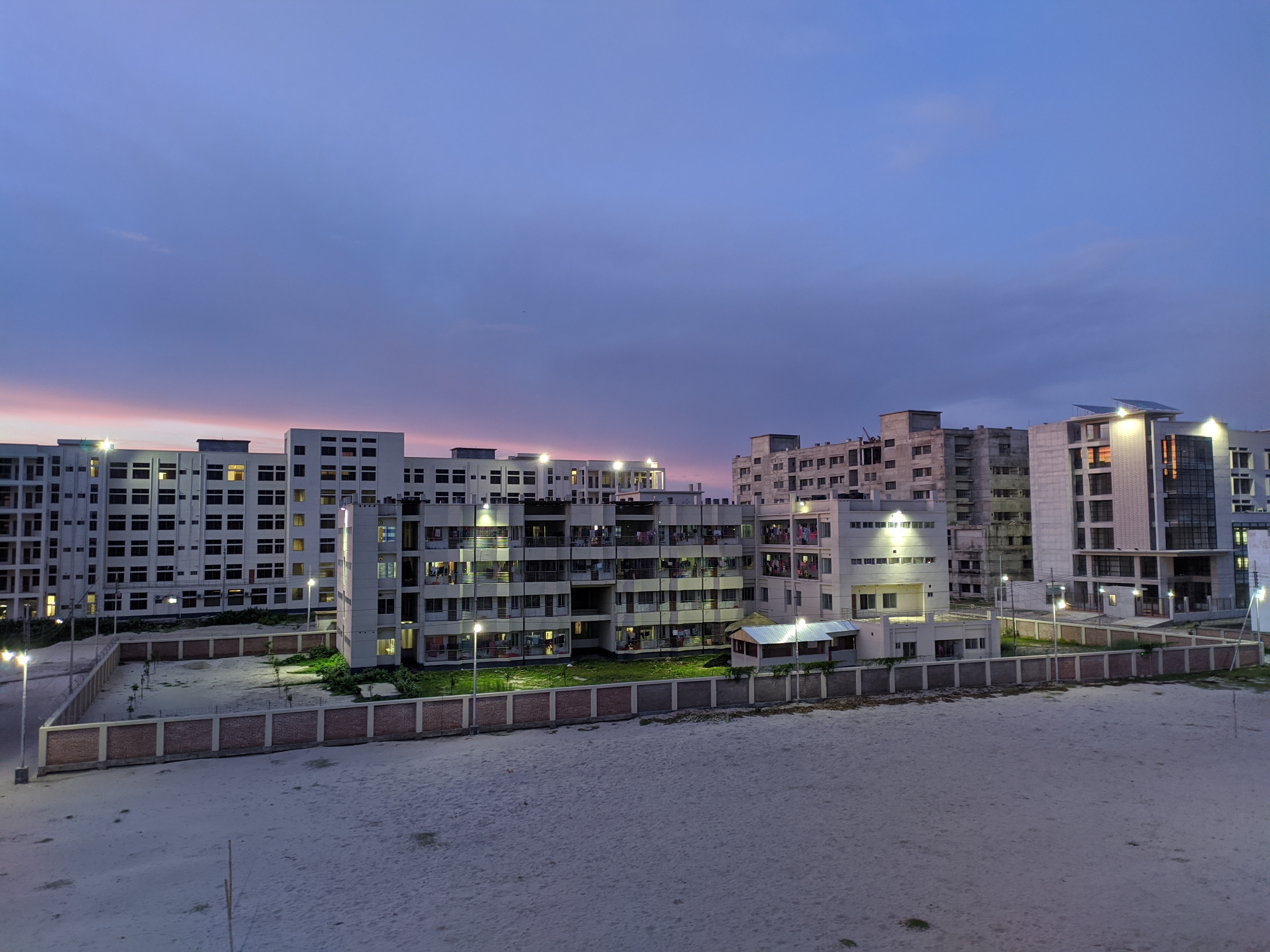
Night view of KuMC campus

Kushtia Medical College (Bengali: কুষ্টিয়া মেডিকেল কলেজ) is a government medical school in Kushtia, Bangladesh, established in 2011. The college is affiliated with Khulna Medical University as a constituent college.

It offers a five-year MBBS degree programme and admits 65 students every year. The commencement of the academic activities started at the MATS, Kushtia temporarily. The permanent campus was started to build in the bank of canal beside the Kushtia-Dhaka Highway and opposite to the Housing #E Block. It is expected the academic and residential options could be supplant to the permanent campus in 2021.

== History ==
In 1978-1979, the Bangladesh government planned to establish medical colleges at Bogra, Comilla, Dinajpur, Faridpur, Kushtia, Khulna, Noakhali and Pabna with a view to improve the healthcare services in the country. Subsequently, the programme was abandoned. Than the government felt the need for more medical colleges for medical education facilities. Accordingly, the government committed to establish four new medical colleges at Kushtia, Satkhira, Gopalganj and Kishoreganj with annual intakes of 52 students at each. The college was established in 2011. In 2011 it started educational service in a part of general hospital. Now it is a modern and technology based medical college and it is running with a 250 bed hospital.

serial	Name	Period
1.	Iftekhar Mahmood	2011-2015 (October)
2.	Jamal Uddin Molla	2015 (November) - 2017 (January)
3.	Mir Mahfujul Haque Chowdhury	2017 (January) - 2017 (October)
4.	S. M. Mostanzid	2017 (October) - 2020 (February)
5.	Asraful Haque Dara	2020 (February) - 2020 (July)
6.	Md.Saleque Masud Mian	2020 (5 July) - 2020 (21 July)
7.	Shomsed Begum	2020 (22 July) - ???
8.	Deldar Hossain	??? - 2023 (18 October)
9.	Mohammad Mahbubur Rahman Khan	2023 (19 October) - present

== Campus ==
Construction work of a permanent campus of Kushtia Medical College started in 2013 at a cost of Tk. 275 crore. However, due to bureaucratic complications and negligence on the part of the contractor, the construction of permanent campus has been repeatedly extended.

=== Accommodation ===
Kushtia Medical College has separate accommodation for boys and girls. The boys' hall is called Rifat-Milon Hostel and the girls' hall is called Rahima-Afsar Hostel.

== Clubs, associations, and extracurricular achievements ==
- Sandhani, KuMC Unit (blood, organ donating charitable organization)
- KuMC Photography Club
- KuMC Debate Club
- KuMC Cultural Society
- Humans Of KuMC
- Chinnomukul (ছিন্নমুকূল)

== See also ==
- List of medical colleges in Bangladesh
