= Kushtia Government Girls High School =

Coordinates: 23.9069°N 89.1328°E

Kushtia Government Girls High School is a government owned girls' school for grades 3–10 situated in Kushtia Sadar Upazila, Kushtia District, Bangladesh. The EIIN number of this school is 117759. It was established in 1963. It has some co-curriculum activities with the British Council.

== See also ==
- Kushtia Zilla School
