= Bhanupriya Bhooter Hotel =

2026 Indian Bengali horror comedy film

- Theatrical release poster
- Directed by: Aritra Mukherjee
- Screenplay by: Zinia Sen and Godhuli Sharma
- Story by: Zinia Sen
- Dialogues by: Zinia Sen and Godhuli Sharma
- Produced by: Nandita Roy; Shiboprosad Mukherjee
- Cinematography: Pratip Mukhopadhyay
- Edited by: Subhajit Singha
- Music by: Songs: Anupam Roy; Arnab Dutta; Score: Amit Chatterjee
- Production company: Windows Production
- Distributed by: Windows Production
- Release date: 23 January 2026
- Running time: 129 minutes
- Country: India
- Language: Bengali

Bhanupriya Bhooter Hotel is a 2026 Indian Bengali horror comedy film directed by Aritra Mukherjee. Written by Zinia Sen and Godhuli Sharma, the film has been produced by Nandita Roy and Shiboprosad Mukherjee under the banner of Windows Production. The film stars Mimi Chakraborty, Soham Majumdar, Bonny Sengupta and Swastika Dutta in the lead roles, while Kanchan Mullick and Anamika Saha play other pivotal roles.

The film is about a lawyer who takes up a legal battle against the owner of a haunted hotel after its ghostly residents seek his help in reclaiming their former graveyard. Anupam Roy and Arnab Dutta has composed the music of the film while Amit Chatterjee did the background score. Pratip Mukhopadhyay did the cinematography while Subhajit Singha handled the editing. The film was released in the theatres on 23 January 2026.

== Plot ==
The film opens at the Bhanupriya Hotel, where a married guest is frightened by some apparitions after he secretly contacted his lover. The story then shifts to lawyer Shaon Mitra, whose grandmother, Manju Mitra, went missing during a trip to Nepal. While trying to find her through a ritual he learnt online, a group of ghosts who reside in the hotel, visit him. They requested him to file a case against the hotel's owner, Bhupati Sinha, claiming that the hotel was built illegally on a graveyard. In return, they promised to help him find his grandmother.

Shaon files a case against Bhupati. His girlfriend, Nandini Basu, appeared for the defence. Since there was no proof that a graveyard ever existed there, the ghosts began searching for evidence inside the hotel. Several guests arrived at the hotel, including actor Aranyadeb, whose recent films had failed. Feeling hopeless, he attempted a suicide but was stopped by Malini, who introduced herself as a journalist. Malini encouraged him to regain his confidence, and they gradually developed feelings for each other.

Nandini and her friend Anee also checked into the hotel. Although Nandini refuses to believe in ghosts, a series of strange incidents made her suspicious. One day, while searching for mobile signal in the forest behind the hotel, she discovered several hidden graves and realized that Shaon was telling the truth. Before she could return, Bhupati's men captured her and took her away.

The ghosts later forced the hotel manager to confess that every room had hidden cameras for Bhupati to murder those, who stood in his way. During their search, the ghosts found a locked vault protected by tantric charms. Smritikona's innocent nature kept her unaffected by the tantra. She successfully opened it and recovered the original map of the graveyard.

Bhupati tried to assault Nandini, but Shaon and Aranyadeb intervened. During the tussle, the woman appearing to be Nandini revealed herself to be Smritikona in disguise. The real Nandini was tied up nearby. Smritikona attempted to kill Bhupati with his own consecrated trident. She then revealed that her real name was Bhanupriya and she was Bhupati's wife. Years earlier, Bhupati had murdered her and transferred her property to his own name. He later named the hotel after her to avoid suspicion. Bhanupriya recovered her skeletal remains from the burial site, providing further evidence against him.

At the final hearing, Shaon submitted the original property map and Bhanupriya's skeleton before the court. Nandini withdrew from the case on ethical grounds. The court informed that Bhupati had fallen into a coma owing to unknown reasons. After examining the evidence, the judge ruled in Shaon's favour and ordered the demolition of the hotel.

After the verdict, life began to return to normal. Aranyadeb decided to make a film with Malini, Love Ranjan found love with Champa, Sumitra reunited with her husband and Shaon proposed to Nandini, who accepted it. Soon afterwards, a man claiming to be Banamali Saha arrived to take ownership of the land. The ghost of the real Banamali Saha appeared and revealed that the property never belonged to him but originally belonged to Shaon's grandmother, Manju. At the end, Bhanupriya and Banamali decide to deal with the impostor themselves.

== Cast ==
- Mimi Chakraborty as Nandini Basu, an advocate
- Soham Majumdar as Shaon Mitra, an advocate and Nandini's beau
- Bonny Sengupta as Aranyadeb, an actor
- Swastika Dutta as Malini, the ghost of actress Patralekha
- Kanchan Mullick as Love Ranjan, a ghost
- Anamika Saha as Sumitra, a ghost
- Joydeep Mukherjee as Bhupati Sinha, the hotel owner
- Anashua Majumdar as Manju Mitra, Shaon's grandmother
- Subhrajit Datta as the hotel manager
- Manasi Sinha as Smritikona, the ghost of Bhanupriya
- Ujan Chatterjee as Kamal, a ghost
- Shruti Das as a guest at the hotel
- Samadarshi Sarkar as the guest's son
- Gulshanara Khatun as Anee, Nandini's friend
- Rajat Gangopadhyay as Sumitra's husband
- Kanchana Moitra as Sumitra's husband's new partner
- Rohit Mukherjee as a guest at the hotel
- Priyanka Bhattacharjee as Champa, a guest at the hotel
- Sanjib Sarkar as a guest at the hotel
- Bimal Giri as a guest at the hotel
- Putul Das as a child ghost

== Production ==
=== Development ===
Zinia Sen said that the idea for Bhanupriya Bhooter Hotel originated during a vacation in Kalimpong, where she stayed at an old hotel whose locked rooms and eerie atmosphere inspired the concept. She discussed the idea of making a horror comedy with Nandita Roy and Shiboprosad Mukherjee, who encouraged her to develop the story. After returning from the trip, Sen shared the concept with director Aritra Mukherjee. Although he initially felt the genre would be challenging because it required creating an entirely fictional world without real-life references for ghost characters, he was intrigued by the premise. Ergo, Zinia Sen started writing the script. The 24th draft was ultimately selected as the final version.

=== Announcement ===
The film was announced on 22 January 2025. The production company's Facebook account appeared to have been hacked, with posts claiming that it had been taken over by ghosts. By the end of the day, the makers revealed that the incident was a marketing stunt to announce the film in a unique way.

The title announcement poster of the film was released on 23 January 2025. It depicted a thematic representation of the film's core idea. A motion poster, which also served as the first look poster for the four lead actors in the film — Mimi Chakraborty, Soham Majumdar, Bonny Sengupta and Swastika Dutta, was released on 19 October 2025, coinciding with Bhoot Chaturdashi. The poster showed a luxurious hotel lobby where two couples are dancing Tango, with a few spectators watching from the back stairs.

=== Casting ===
Bhanupriya Bhooter Hotel marked Aritra Mukherjee's fourth collaboration with Windows Production after Brahma Janen Gopon Kommoti (2020), Baba Baby O (2022) and Fatafati (2023).

The principal cast of the film was announced on 13 June 2025 — Mimi Chakraborty, Soham Majumdar, Bonny Sengupta and Swastika Dutta. This film marked Shruti Das's second collaboration with the Windows Production House after Aamar Boss (2025). Anamika Saha was cast in the film, marking her first collaboration with the production house. Kanchan Mullick was also cast in a pivotal role.

=== Filming ===
Principal photography began on 22 June 2025 in Lava, where a three-day outdoor schedule was held. Following this, filming continued across North Bengal, primarily in North Bengal and Kolkata. The North Bengal schedules were mainly filmed at Rishop, Lava and Kalimpong. Additional scenes shot in several nearby mountain villages.

After the completion of the North Bengal schedule, the filming shifted to Kolkata for the indoor sequences, for which a luxurious hotel set was constructed inside a studio.

Director Aritra Mukherjee shared in an interview that filming in Lava was frequently disrupted by heavy rainfall, dense fog, and the presence of leeches. During the shoot, Kanchan Mullick was bitten by leeches while several members of the crew also faced similar incidents.

Swastika Dutta injured her cornea while filming an outdoor schedule in North Bengal in June 2025. During the filming of a scene involving strong gusts of wind, a grain of sand entered her eye, which she initially believed to be a minor particle. Afterwards, owing to excruciating pain, when she was taken to a nearby hospital, doctors confirmed that she has sustained a corneal injury. Filming was suspended for two days following the incident. Dutta subsequently completed the remainder of her scenes using anaesthetic eye drops, which enabled her to keep her eyes open for approximately 20 minutes after each application.

== Soundtrack ==
Bhanupriya Bhooter Hotel

Soundtrack album by Anupam Roy and Arnab Dutta
- Released: 2026
- Genre: Film soundtrack
- Length: 14:41
- Language: Bengali
- Labels: Times Music Bangla; Windows

Anupam Roy and Arnab Dutta has composed the music of the film. Amit Chatterjee has done the background score. The lyrics were penned by Roy and Dutta for their respective compositions.

The first song "Tumi Ke" was released on 5 December 2025. The song marked the first use of Tango in a Bengali film. The second song "Chandni Raate" was dropped on 30 December 2025. The third song "Ami Bar Bar" was released on 6 January 2026. Shot in black and white, this song served as a tribute to the golden era of Bengali cinema. The fourth and last song of the album "Chol Paliye Chol" was released on 21 January 2026.

Track listing
| No. | Title | Lyrics | Music | Singer(s) | Length |
|---|---|---|---|---|---|
| 1. | "Tumi Ke" | Anupam Roy | Anupam Roy | Anupam Roy, Srijita Mitra | 3:44 |
| 2. | "Chandni Raate" | Arnab Dutta | Arnab Dutta | Saptak Bhattacharjee, Shrestha Das | 3:40 |
| 3. | "Ami Bar Bar" | Arnab Dutta | Arnab Dutta | Arnab Dutta, Kajol Chatterjee | 3:35 |
| 4. | "Chol Paliye Chol" | Arnab Dutta | Arnab Dutta | Arnab Dutta, Iman Chakraborty | 3:42 |
| Total length: | | | | | 14:41 |

== Marketing ==
The teaser of Bhanupriya Bhooter Hotel was released on 20 December 2025. The trailer of the film was revealed on 16 January 2026. The trailer launch event was held at the Polo Floatel in Kolkata. The film was premiered at the Cinépolis in Acropolis Mall, Kolkata.

== Release ==
=== Theatrical ===
The film was initially scheduled for release in December 2025, during the Christmas period. However, following a meeting of the Screening Committee, the makers were requested to choose a different release date to avoid release clashes and minimize the potential impact on box office business. The film was subsequently released on 23 January 2026, with a U/A 16+ rating from the Central Board of Film Certification.

Director Aritra Mukherjee alleged that certain production houses were deliberately doing paid negative campaign to lower the film's rating on BookMyShow. He further claimed that fake and bot-operated accounts had been posting low ratings on the platform since the morning of the film's release.

=== Home media ===
The digital streaming rights of the film was obtained by ZEE5. The film was premiered on ZEE5 on 15 April 2026, coinciding with Poila Baisakh.

== Reception ==
=== Critical reception ===
Eshna Bhattacharya of The Times of India rated the film 3.5/5 stars and wrote "The film balances mild scares, clever humour, and engaging performances in a way that makes it accessible to audiences across age groups. The writing, direction, and ensemble performances work in concert to create a cinematic experience that is both intelligent and enjoyable." She appreciated the direction, the tone and pace of the film, well maintained balance between humour, suspense and warmth, the script and dialogues, the witty humour, the attention to details in every scene, the performance of the ensemble cast, the music and background score, the visually aplomb sets, the costumes and the lighting. But she criticized the slow pace in certain sequences, uneven tonal transitions and the occasional reliance of humour on exaggerated expressions and familiar tropes.

Prabhat Roy of Sangbad Pratidin reviewed the film and opined "Bhanupriya Bhooter Hotel is a new effort, a new surprise from the team of Nandita, Shiboprosad, Zinia and Aritra. Both horror and comedy are very naturally mixed in the story." She praised the use of light and shadow for creating spooky and gunny moments in the film, the pace in the second half, the twists in the last few minutes, the screenplay and dialogues, the music, the cinematography, the performance of the ensemble cast and the director's shrewd prudence. But she bemoaned the excessive time taken in the first half, just for the development of the characters.
