= Aritra Mukherjee =

Indian film director and screenwriter

- Born: Shantiniketan, West Bengal, India
- Education: Jadavpur University
- Occupations: Film director; Screenwriter; Dialogue writer
- Years active: 2000s—present
- Spouse: Namrata Mukherjee (m. 2006)
- Children: 2

Aritra Mukherjee (pronounced [ɔritro mukʰard͡ʒi]) is an Indian film director and screenwriter who works in the Bengali film industry. He began his career as an assistant director and worked on several Bengali films before making his directorial debut with Brahma Janen Gopon Kommoti in 2020. He subsequently directed Baba Baby O (2022), Fatafati (2023) and Bhanupriya Bhooter Hotel (2026).

Brahma Janen Gopon Kommoti was screened in the Indian Panorama section of the 51st International Film Festival of India in 2021. Mukherjee received nominations for Filmfare Awards Bangla and the West Bengal Film Journalists' Association Awards for Best Debut Director and Most Promising Director, respectively, for the film.

== Career ==
Mukherjee began his professional career in the Bengali television industry. He worked as an assistant director, screenwriter and dialogue writer on television programs including Bouma, Daakbabu and Prathama. He subsequently worked as an assistant director in Bengali cinema, under the direction of Nandita Roy and Shiboprosad Mukherjee. Before making his directorial debut, he worked as an assistant director in about twenty films, including Icche (2011), Muktodhara (2012), Alik Sukh (2013), Ramdhanu (2014), Belaseshe (2015), Praktan (2016), Posto (2017), Haami (2018), Konttho (2019) and Gotro (2019).

In 2020, he directed Brahma Janen Gopon Kommoti. The film was produced by Nandita Roy and Shiboprosad Mukherjee, and marked his project under the banner of Windows Production. It was screened under the Panorama section at the 51st IFFI in 2021. His next directorial was Baba Baby O, released in 2022. The film, written by Zinia Sen and Samragnee Bandopadhyay, starred Jisshu Sengupta and Solanki Roy and was produced under the banner of Windows Production.

In 2023, Mukherjee directed Fatafati, a drama film starring Ritabhari Chakraborty and Abir Chatterjee. The screenplay was written by Zinia Sen, with dialogues by Samragnee Bandyopadhyay. Mukherjee subsequently directed the horror-comedy Bhanupriya Bhooter Hotel in 2026. The film was written by Zinia Sen and Godhuli Sharma and starred Mimi Chakraborty, Soham Majumdar, Bonny Sengupta and Swastika Dutta.

== Filmmaking style ==
Mukherjee's films focus on contemporary social issues, gender relations, family and parenthood, often using comedy and drama to tell the stories. His films often deal with characters facing social expectations and family-related issues. Brahma Janen Gopon Kommoti explores gender inequality through the story of a woman who becomes a priest, while Baba Baby O deals with single fatherhood and surrogacy. Fatafati deals with social stigma and body shaming through the story of a fat woman who becomes a fashion influencer.

== Filmography ==
Year	Film	Notes	Ref.
2020	Brahma Janen Gopon Kommoti	Directorial debut; Screened under Panorama section of the 51st IFFI in 2021	
2022	Baba Baby O		
2023	Fatafati		
2026	Bhanupriya Bhooter Hotel		

=== Web series ===
Year	Series	Platform	Notes	Ref.
2021	Tarader Shesh Tarpon	Hoichoi	Marked his streaming productions directorial debut; Documentary web series	

== Accolades ==
Year	Award	Ceremony	Category	Work	Result	Ref.
2022	Filmfare Awards Bangla	5th Filmfare Awards Bangla	Best Debut Director	Brahma Janen Gopon Kommoti	Nominated	
2022	WBFJA Awards	5th WBFJA Award	Most Promising Director	Brahma Janen Gopon Kommoti	Nominated	
