= Mazampur =

Mazampur মজমপুর
- Area of Kushtia
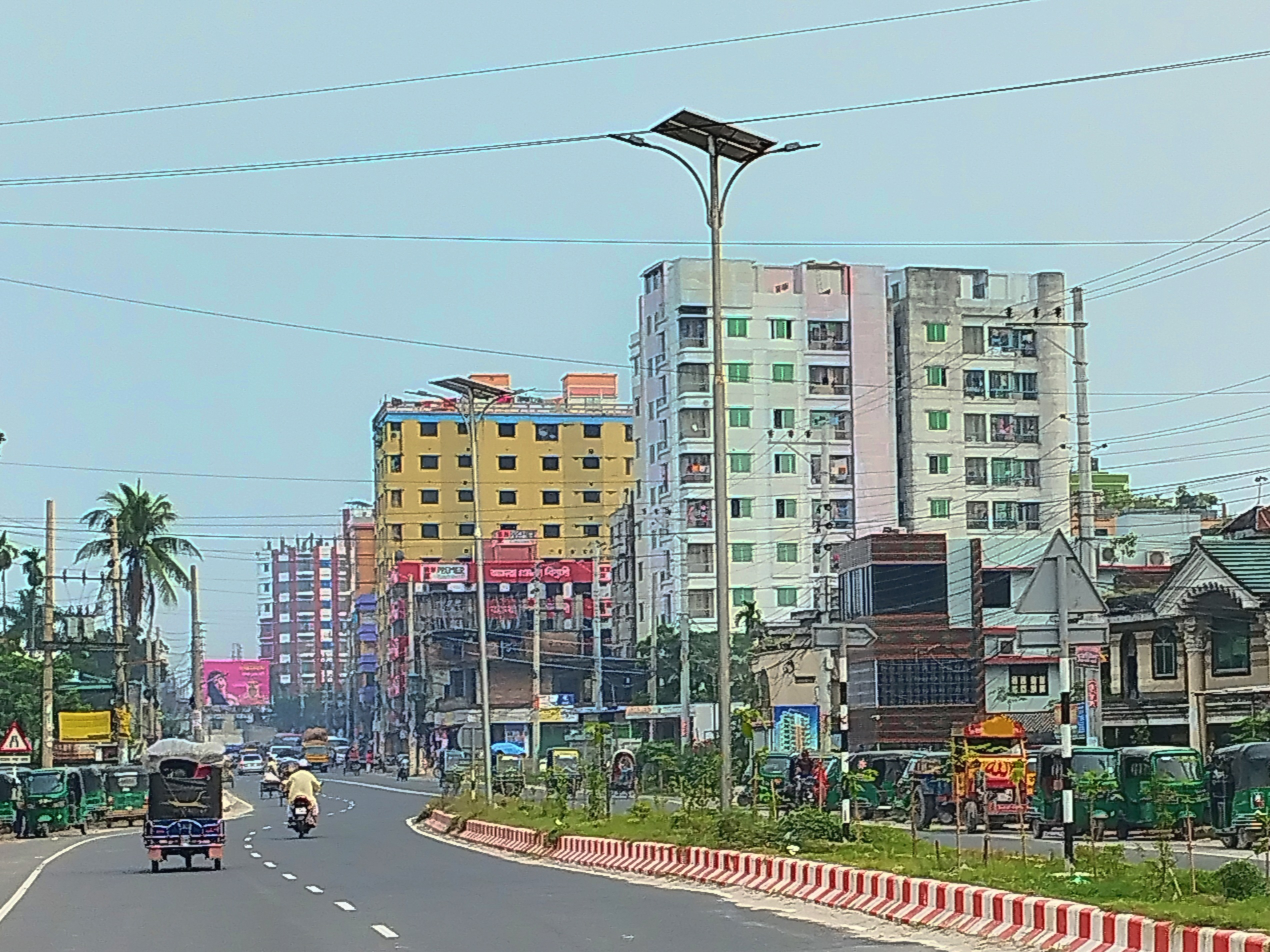
- Dadapur Road

- Location within Bangladesh
- Coordinates: 23.908636°N 89.121677°E
- Country: Bangladesh
- Municipality: Kushtia

Mazampur or Mojompur is one of the busiest and most densely populated areas in Kushtia city. Most of the bus counters for routes to the capital Dhaka are located here. Due to its heavy traffic and population, numerous hotels, restaurants, and businesses have developed in the area. A sculpture titled 'Hateful Razakar' (Ghrinito Razakar) has been erected here to express public hatred toward Razakars.

== Ghrinito Razakar ==
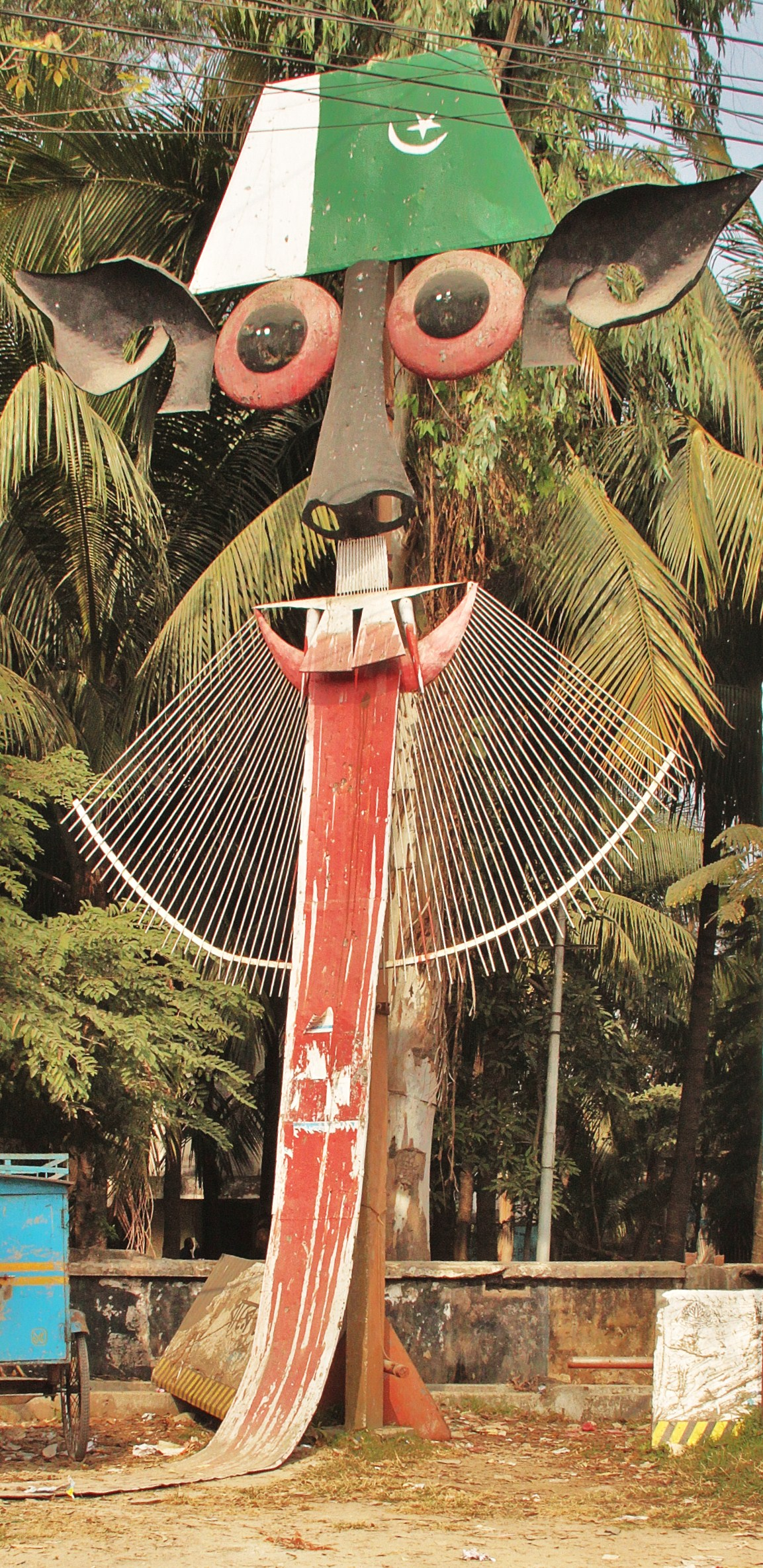
The 'Hateful Razakar' sculpture in 2013

The 'Hateful Razakar' (Ghrinito Rajakar) sculpture was first built on 16 December 2000 in front of Kushtia Zilla School. It was inaugurated by researcher Abul Ahsan Chowdhury. Later, under the initiative of the National Committee for the Construction of the 'Hateful Razakar' sculpture it was relocated to the Mazampur Gate at the city's entrance. The reinstalled sculpture was inaugurated on 17 April 2009 by freedom fighter Chitta Ranjan Dutta.

The design was created by sculptor Iti Khan. At the time construction of the sculpture cost ৳32,000. The sculpture stood 18 feet (5.5 m) tall (according to some sources 25 feet (7.6 m)) and was mounted on a tall concrete pillar. A list of Razakars was also installed alongside the sculpture, though it is no longer present. In May 2025 the entire sculpture was demolished.

== Gallery ==
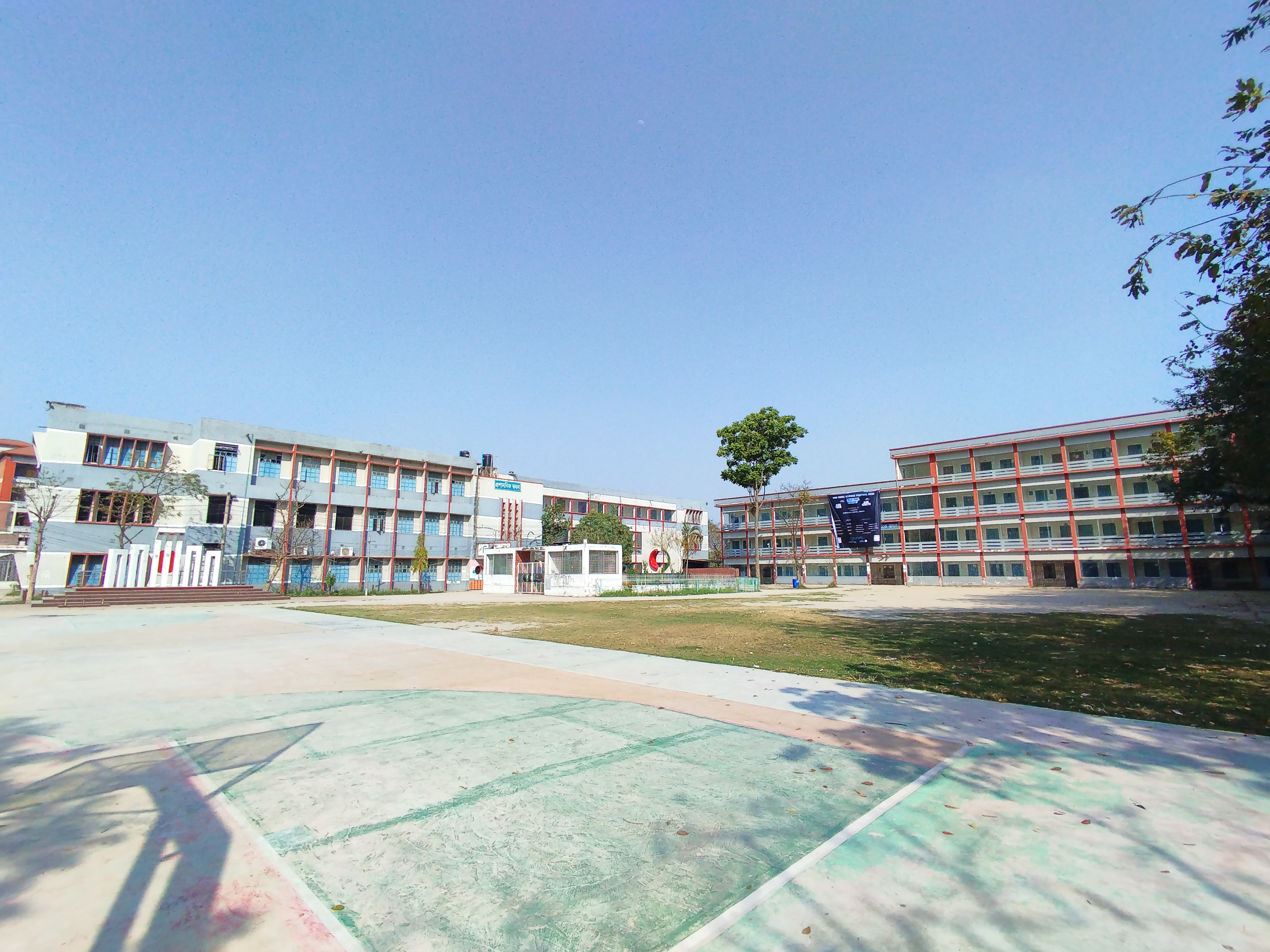
Kushtia Zilla School

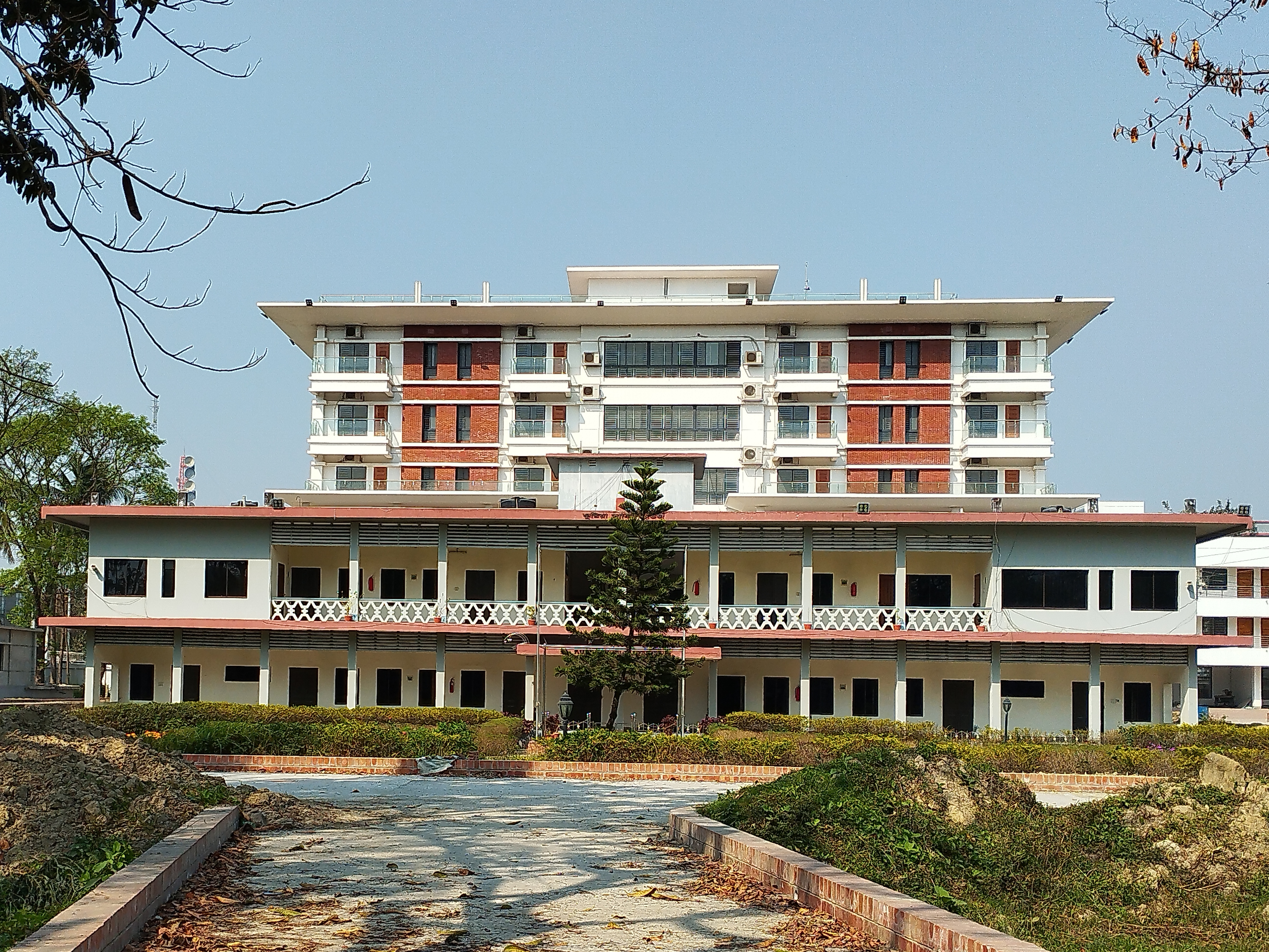
Kushtia Circuit House

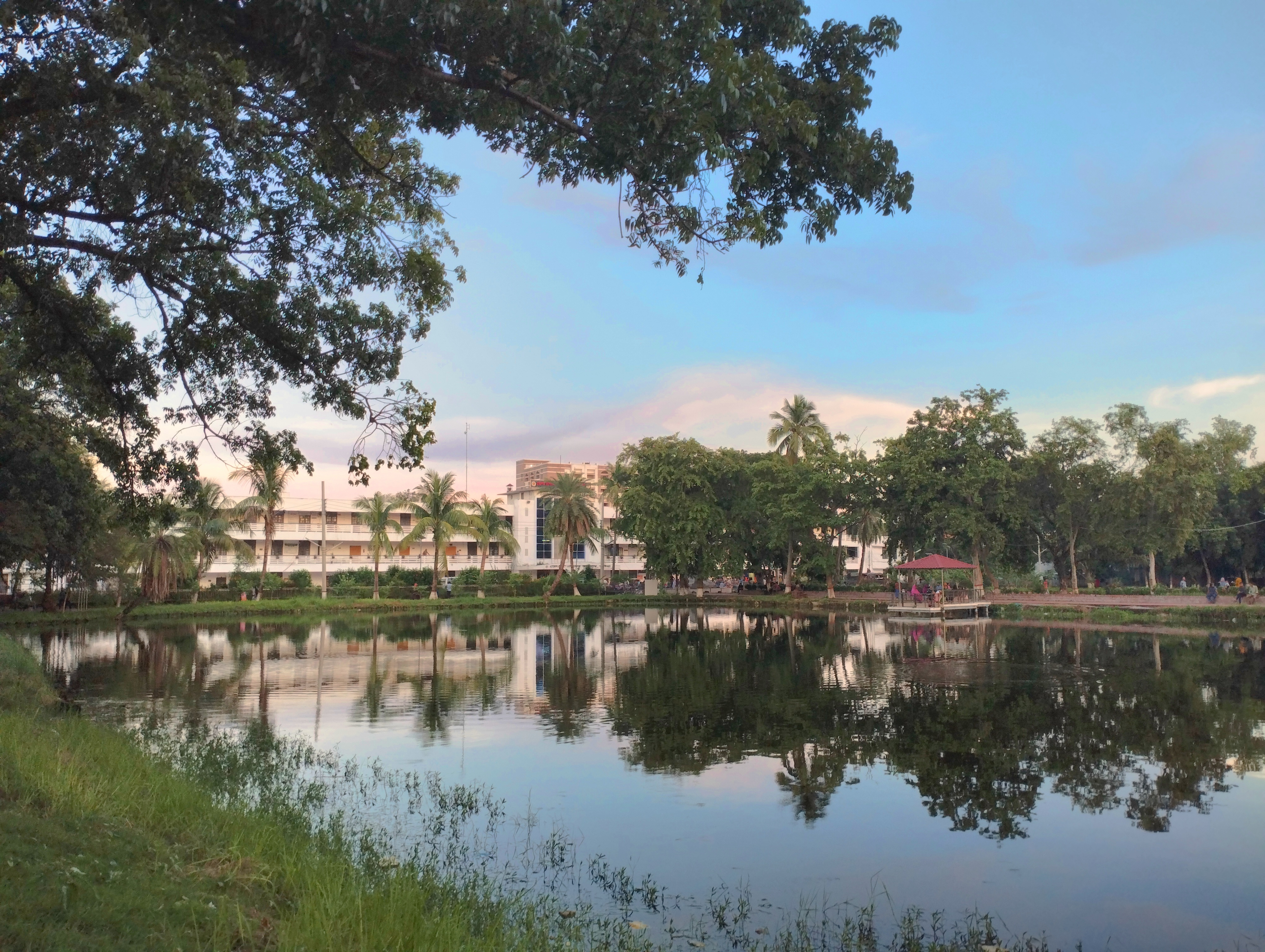
Kushtia District Commissioner's Office

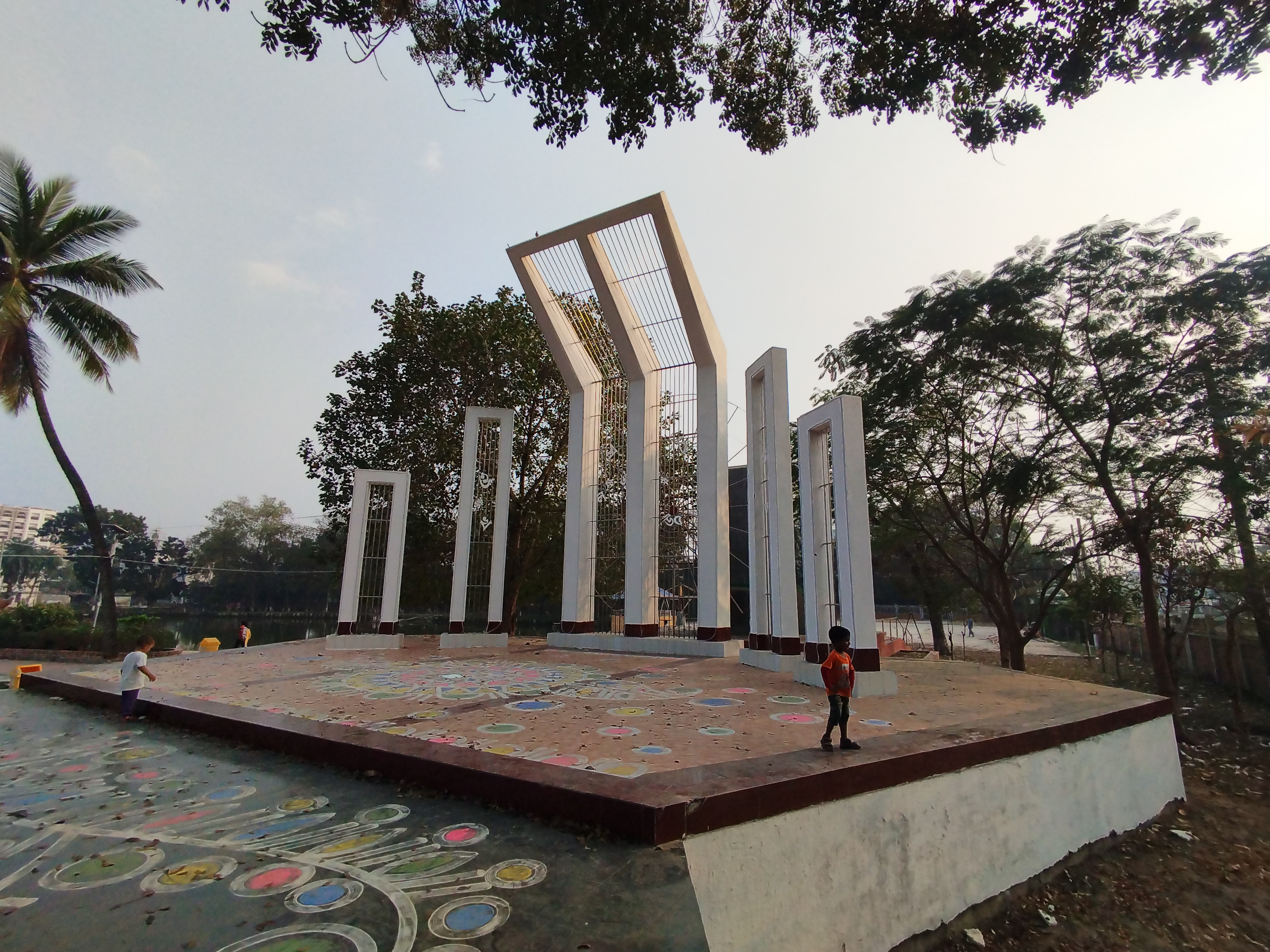
Kushtia Central Shaheed Minar

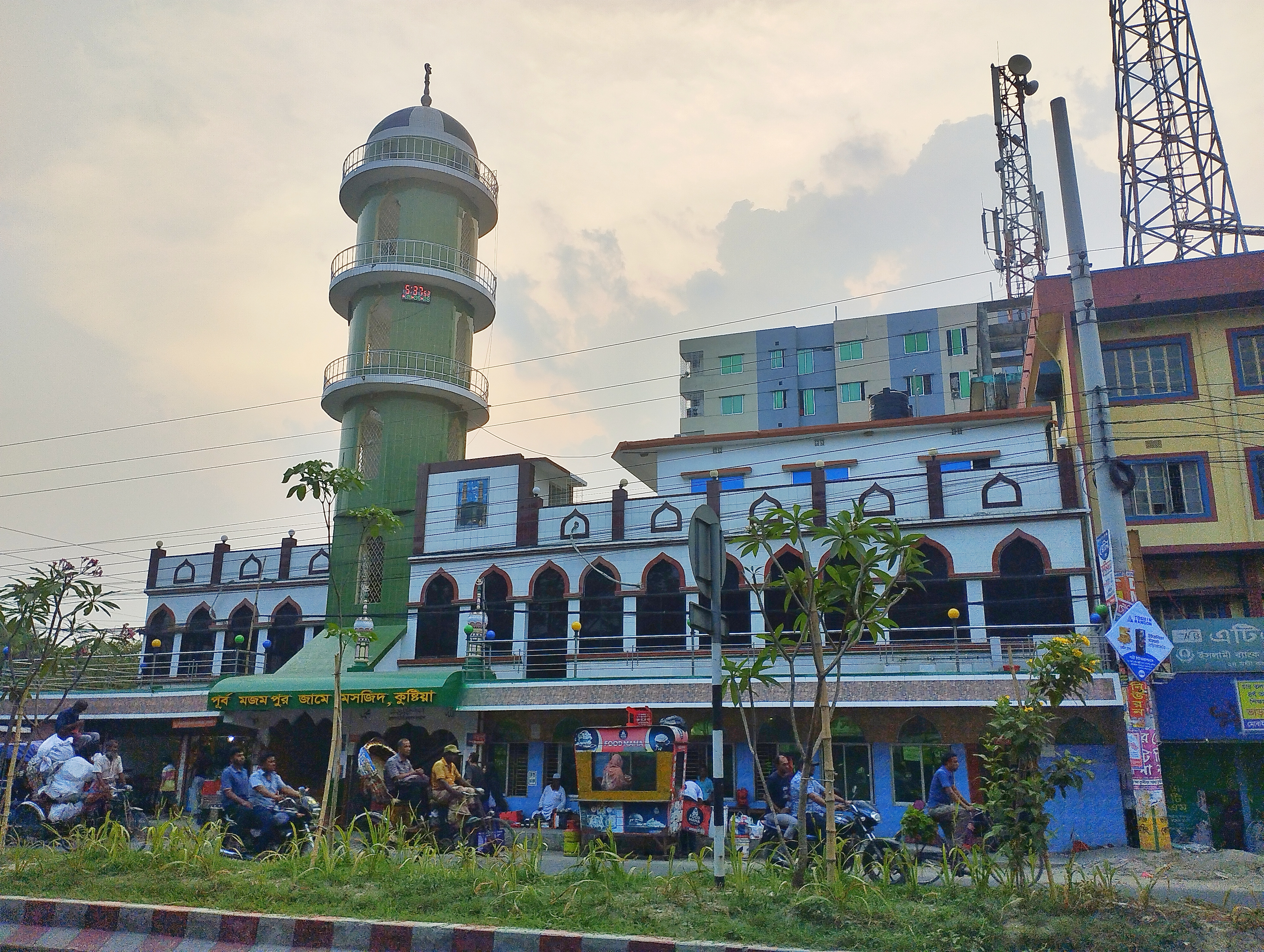
East Mazampur Jame Mosque, established in 1888

== External ==
- Media related to Mojompur at Wikimedia Commons
