= Changey Falls =

Waterfall in West Bengal, India

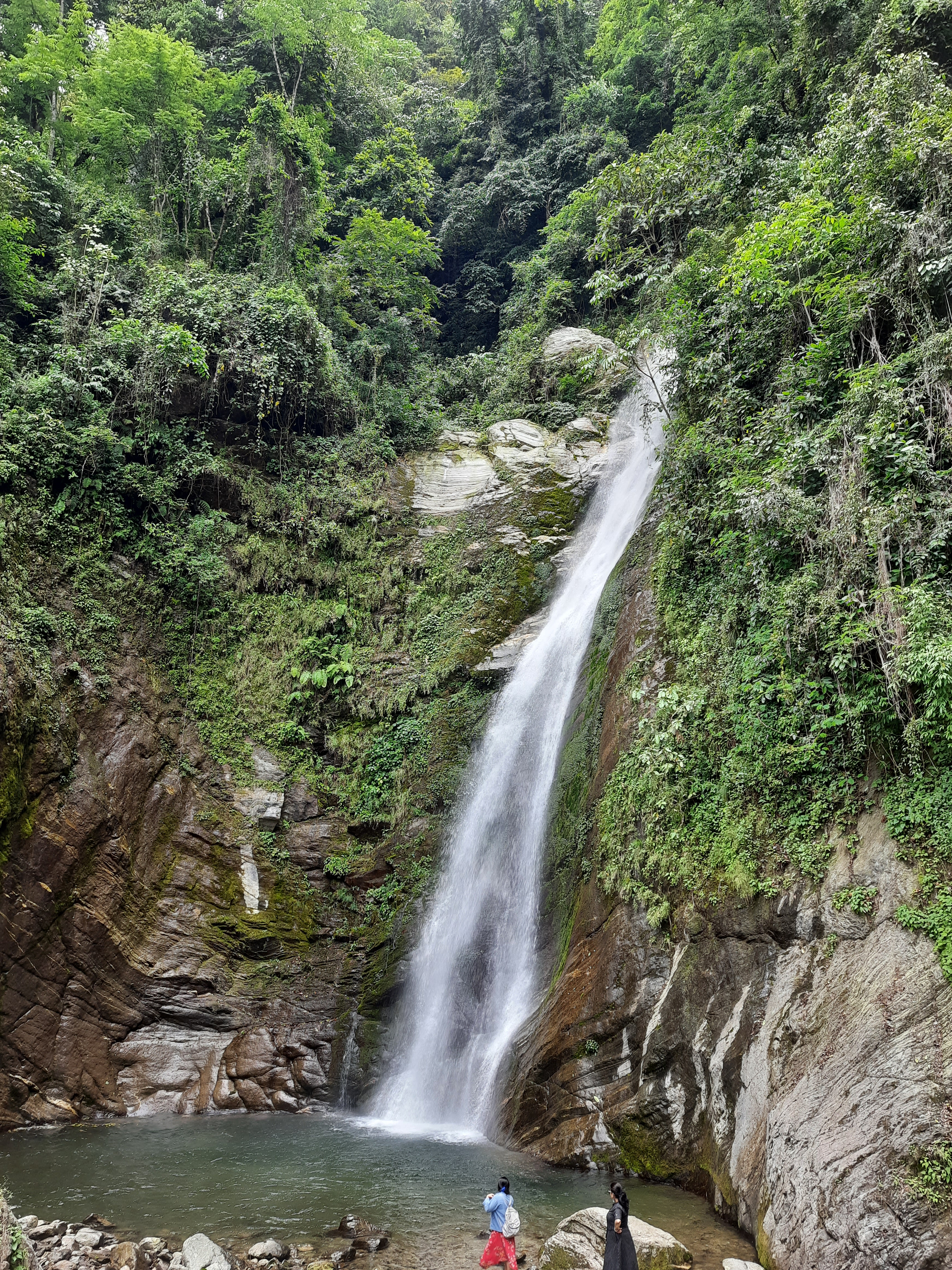
- Changey Falls

- Location within West Bengal Location within India
- Location: Lingsaykha Khasmahal, West Bengal, India
- Coordinates: 27.11298°N 88.67867°E
- Total height: 300 m (984 ft)

Changey Falls is a waterfall located in Lingsaykha Khasmahal, West Bengal, India.

== Location ==
The waterfall sits at an elevation of 2,200 m (7,218 ft) and is situated at a distance of about 4 km (2.5 mi) from Kolakham and 10 km (6.2 mi) from the hamlet of Lava in Kalimpong district, West Bengal. It is reachable via a 900 m (0.56 mi) trek along a short walking trail from the last motorable point. The waterfall has several viewing decks.

The nearest airport is Bagdogra Airport and the nearest railway station is New Jalpaiguri Junction railway station, Siliguri.
