= Chamok Hasan =

Bangladeshi author, online educator

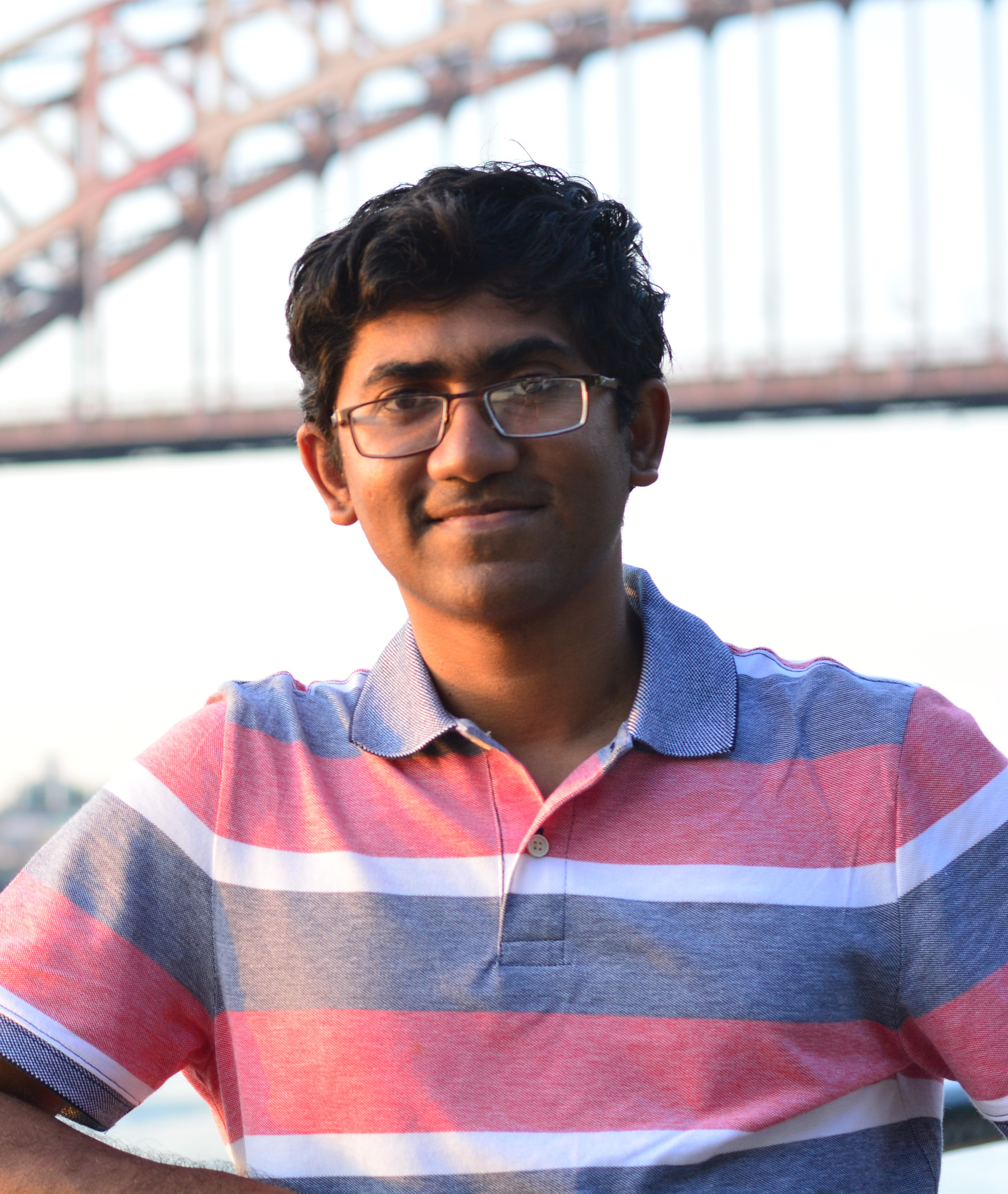
- Chamok Hasan in 2020
- Born: Nowrin Hasan Chamok; 28 July 1986 (age 40); Kushtia, Kushtia District, Khulna Division, Bangladesh
- Education: Kushtia Zilla School; Kushtia Government College; Bangladesh University of Engineering and Technology (BSc Eng); University of South Carolina (PhD)
- Occupations: Author, musician, educator, electrical engineer
- Years active: 2015–present
- Spouse: Feroza Binte Omar
- Children: 2

Nowrin Hasan Chamok (Bengali: নওরিন হাসান চমক), commonly known as Chamok Hasan, is an author, musician, online educator and engineer from Bangladesh. As of 2022, he authored 6 books on mathematics and popular science in Bengali. Chamok debuted as a music producer and playback singer in the 2022 Indian Bengali-language drama film Baba Baby O. In 2023, he wrote and performed "Swapno bonar somoy ekhon" for another Indian film Fatafati.

== Works ==
=== Bibliography ===
- Golpe-jolpe Genetics গল্পে-জল্পে জেনেটিক্স (2012)
- Goniter Ronge: Hashikhushi Gonit গণিতের রঙ্গে: হাসিখুশি গণিত (2015)
- Onko Bhaiya অঙ্ক ভাইয়া (2018)
- Nimikh Pane: Calculus er Poth Poribhromon, Parts 1 & 2 নিমিখ পানে: ক্যালকুলাসের পথ পরিভ্রমণ (2019)
- Juktifande Foring যুক্তিফাঁদে ফড়িং (2021)
- Nibir Gonit নিবীড় গণিত (2022)

=== Discography ===
Year	Film	Track title	Producer(s)	Writer(s)	Singer(s)
2022	Baba Baby O	"Ei Mayabi Chander Raate"	Chamok Hasan, Amit- Ishan, Rudraneel Chowdhury	Chamok Hasan, Firoza Bonhi	Chamok Hasan, Ikkshita Mukherjee, Hemlata Chakraborty
2023	Fatafati	"Swapno Bonar Somoy Ekhon"	Chamok Hasan, Amit Chatterjee	Chamok Hasan	Chamok Hasan, Anwesshaa Duttagupta

== Personal life ==
Chamok holds a PhD in electrical engineering and works at Boston Scientific Corporation in California, United States as a research and development engineer. He is married to Feroza Binte Omar and the couple has two children. Chamok mentioned Feroza as a song-writing partner.
