= Kushtia Zilla School =

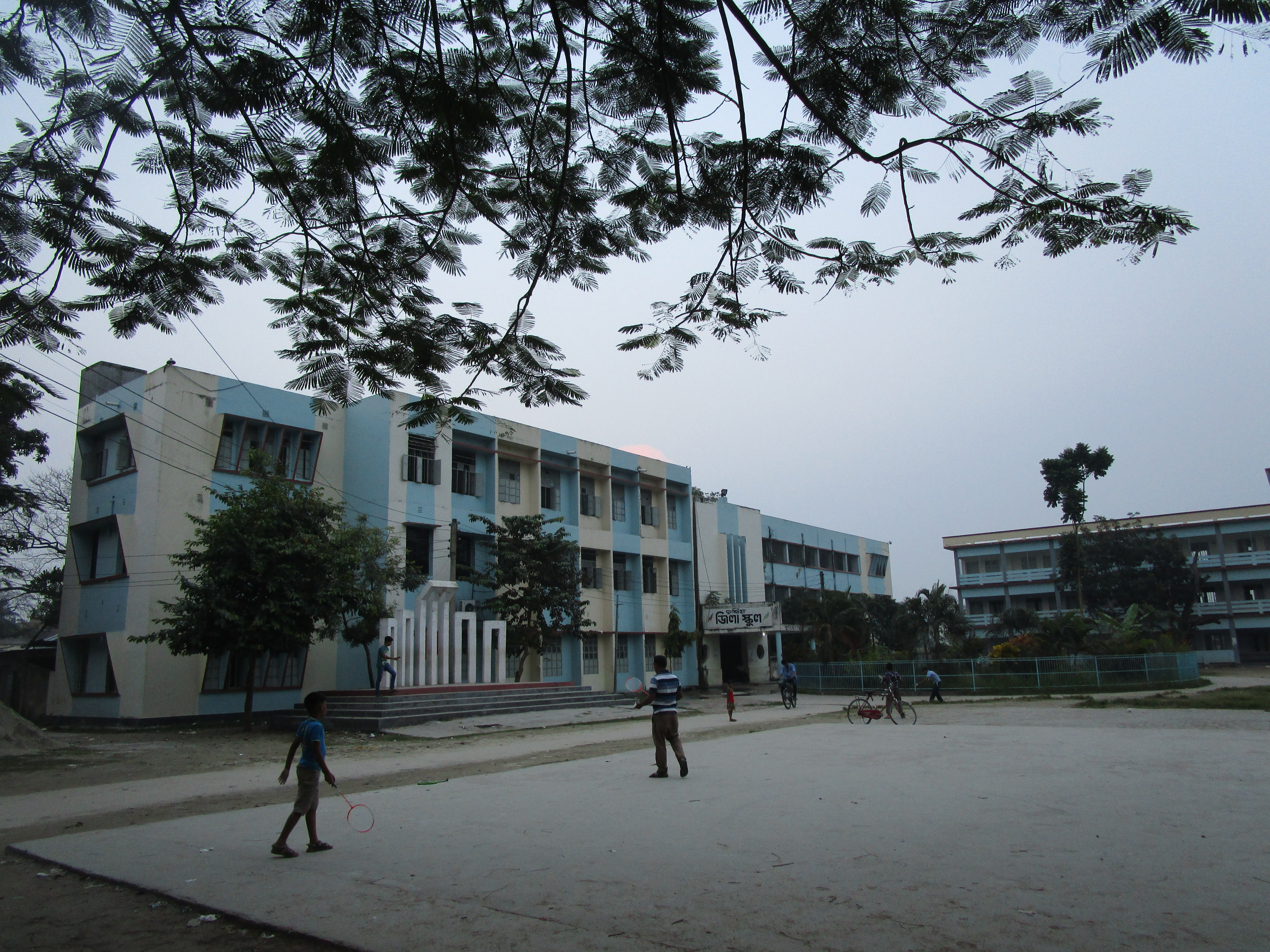
- Front view of Kushtia Zilla School

Location
- Kushtia; Bangladesh; 23.9054°N 89.1207°E

Information
- Type: Public
- Established: 1961
- School board: Board of Intermediate and Secondary Education, Jashore
- Headmaster: Munshi Kamruzzaman (acting)
- Faculty: 50
- Grades: Class 3 to Class 10
- Gender: Male
- Enrollment: 2,000
- Language: Bengali
- Website: kushtiazillaschool.edu.bd

Kushtia Zilla School is a public school for boys in Kushtia, Bangladesh. It offers education from Class 3 through Class 10 to about 2,000 students in two shifts.

The school was established in 1961. At the outbreak of the Bangladesh Liberation War, a company of Pakistan Army troops set up their headquarters there. A few days later they were attacked, driven from the school, and nearly annihilated by rebel forces.

== History ==
Kushtia Zilla School was established in 1961, when Kushtia was part of East Pakistan.

Ten years later, it was the largest school in what was then a town of 30,000 people. When the Bangladesh Liberation War broke out in 1971, the Pakistani Army tried to control the East Pakistani populace. During the night of 25 March, a company of the 27 Baloch Regiment entered Kushtia. They disarmed 500 police there and occupied the school and other key positions.

Many personnel of the East Pakistan Rifles (EPR) turned against the Pakistan Army. Before dawn on 30 March, several thousand members of the EPR, augmented by police and Ansars (paramilitary militia), attacked the West Pakistani troops in Kushtia. Major Abu Osman Chowdhury was in overall command of the attack.

The West Pakistanis called for reinforcements, but none came. After two days of fighting, having fallen back to the radio station and the school, 75 surviving soldiers tried to break out of the siege under cover of darkness and retreat to their army base at Jessore. Finding the road blocked, they fled into the countryside. Most were killed by farmers "armed with hatchets, knives, and bamboo staves". Only about a dozen lived.

== Academics ==
Kushtia Zilla School is a school for boys. It offers education from Class 3 through Class 10. To serve its approximately 2,000 students, it operates two shifts—a morning shift and a day shift. It employs about 50 teachers.

== Campus ==
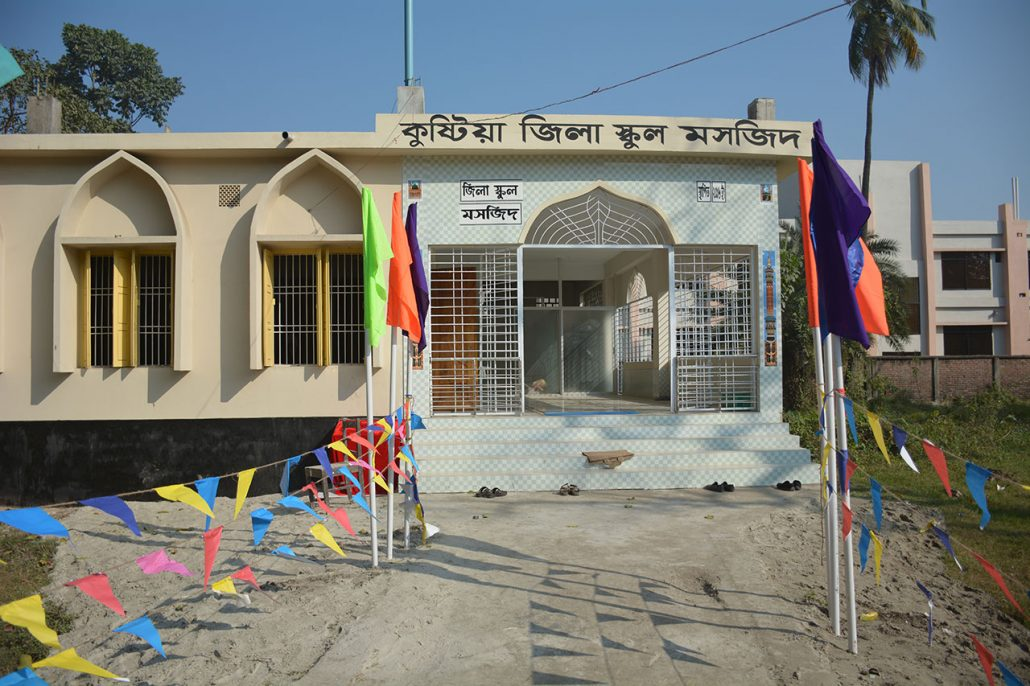
Kushtia Zilla School Mosque

The Kushtia Zilla School campus is located on 8 acres (3.2 ha) in the heart of Kushtia, on the east side of the Rajshahi-Khulna Highway. The three-story administration building was built in 1961. A four-story academic building was added in 2010.

== Notable alumni ==
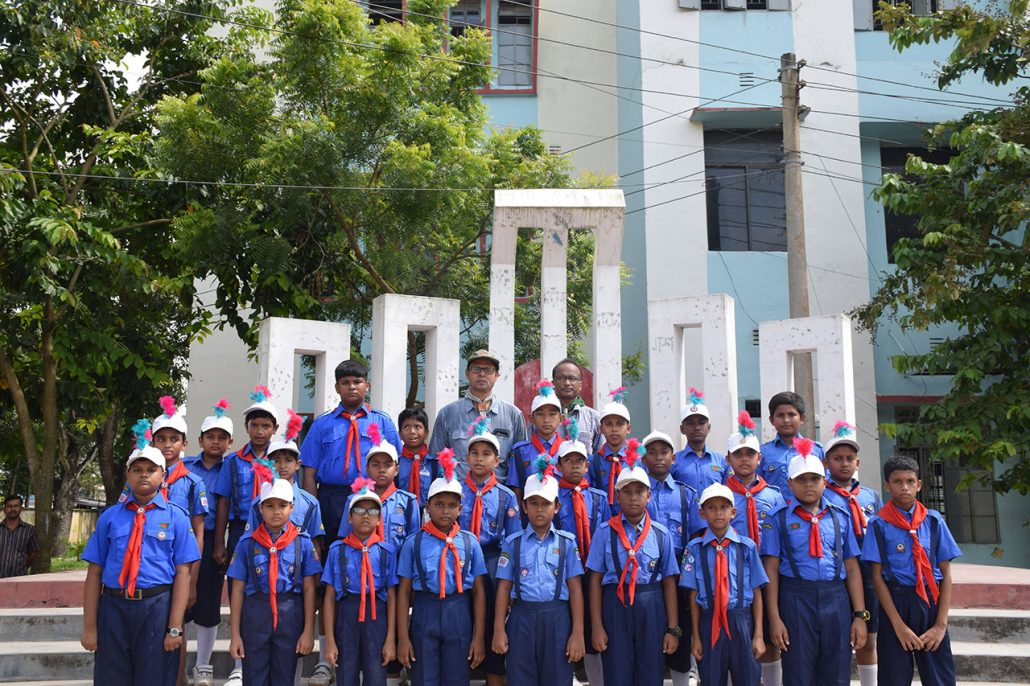
Students of Kushtia Zilla School

- Abul Barkat, economist and professor at the University of Dhaka
- Abul Ahsan Chowdhury, professor of Bengali at Islamic University, Bangladesh and Bangla Academy Literary Award recipient
- Raghib Rauf Chowdhury, attorney general
- Abrar Farhad, murdered Bangladesh University of Engineering and Technology student and posthumous Independence Award recipient
- Anamul Haque, wicket-keeper for Bangladesh national cricket team
- Chamok Hasan, author, musician, educator and electrical engineer
- Masum Reza, playwright, television and stage director
- Sadik Hasan Rumi, major general
- S.I. Tutul, singer and musician
