= Kagyu Thekchen Ling Monastery =

Buddhist monastery in Lava, West Bengal

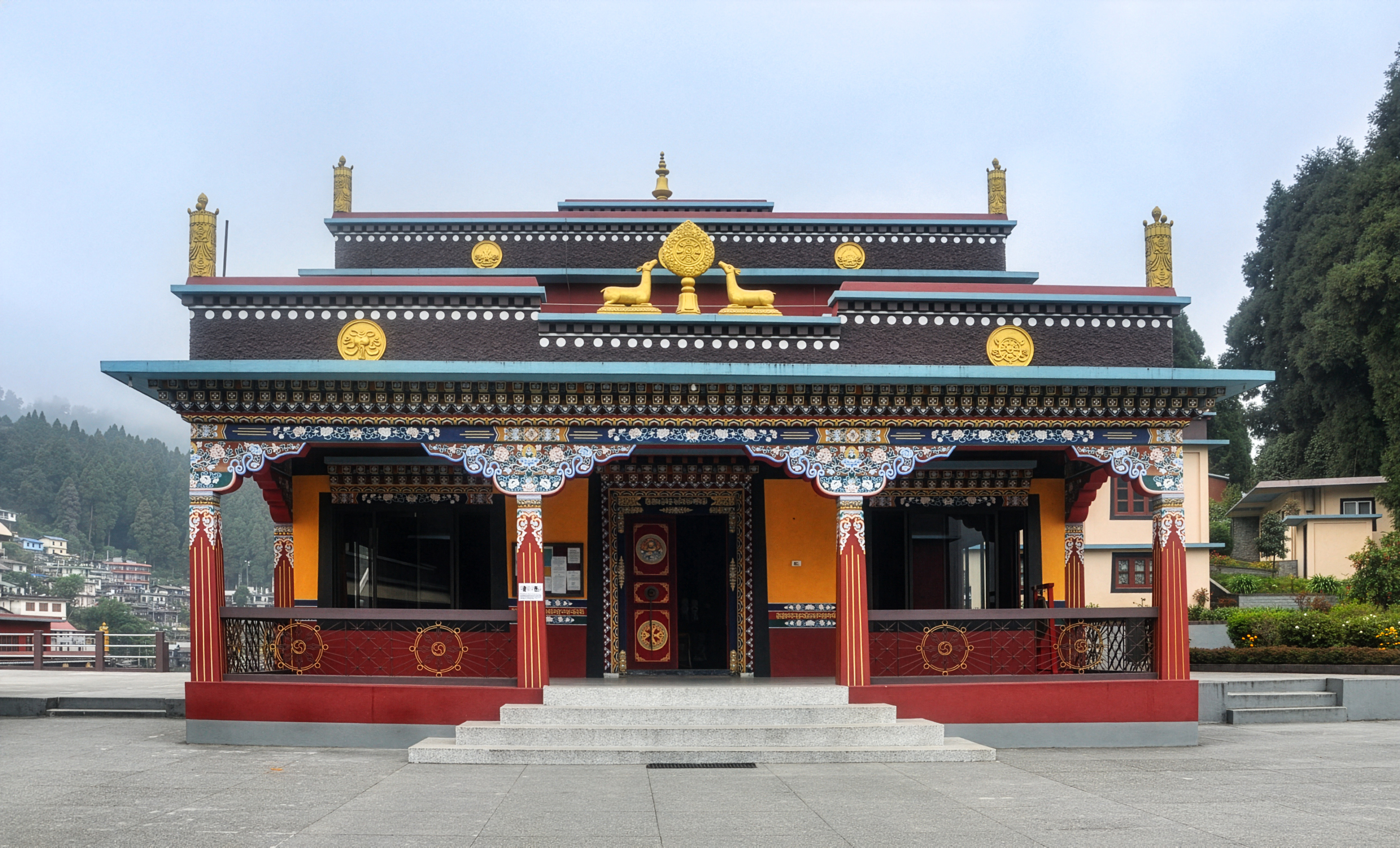
- Kagyu Thekchen Ling Monastery

- Location in West Bengal Kagyu Thekchen Ling Monastery (India)

Religion
- Affiliation: Tibetan Buddhism

Location
- Location: Lava, Kalimpong district, West Bengal, India
- Interactive map of Kagyu Thekchen Ling Monastery
- Coordinates: 27.0860°N 88.6638°E

Architecture
- Founder: Karma Lodrö Chökyi Senge
- Established: June 6, 1990

Kagyu Thekchen Ling Monastery, also known as Ratnarishi Bihar Buddhist Gumpa or simply Lava Monastery, is a Buddhist monastery situated in Lava, West Bengal, India.

== History ==
In the 1980s, the local Buddhist community of Lava offered Karma Lodrö Chökyi Senge (1954–1992), the 3rd Jamgon Kongtrul Rinpoche, four acres of land to establish a Buddhist monastery in the hamlet, with the aim of preserving local religious and cultural tradition. The offer was accepted in 1987 and construction work commenced in April, 1988. The monastery was opened on June 6, 1990, on the occasion of Chökhor Düchen.

In 2001, the Dalai Lama opened Mane Lhakhang, a community temple next to the monastery. Today, over a hundred monks practise Buddhist philosophy at the monastery.

== Location ==
The monastery is located in Lava, Kalimpong district in the Indian state of West Bengal. It sits just beside the Neora Reservoir, and serves as a gateway to the Neora Valley National Park. It is at a distance of about 32 km (19.9 mi) from Kalimpong. The nearest railway station is New Jalpaiguri Junction railway station and the nearest airport is Bagdogra Airport in Bagdogra, Siliguri.

== Description ==
The monastery resembles elements and styles of Tibetan architecture, and is built of brick and concrete. It has several prayer halls, lawns, sitting areas, and houses a large Buddha statue. It is properly maintained.

== Gallery ==
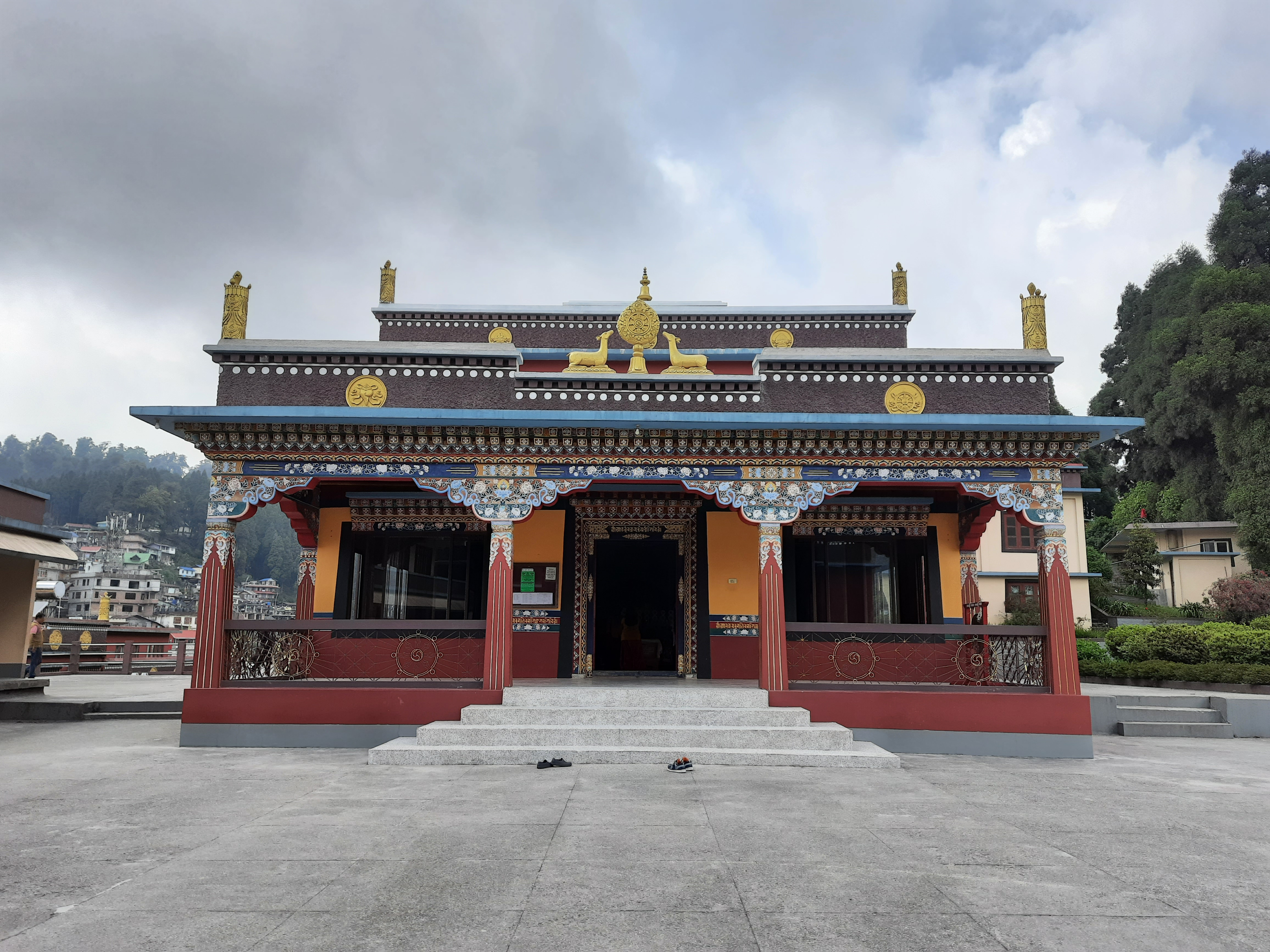
Kagyu Thekchen Ling Monastery, Lava

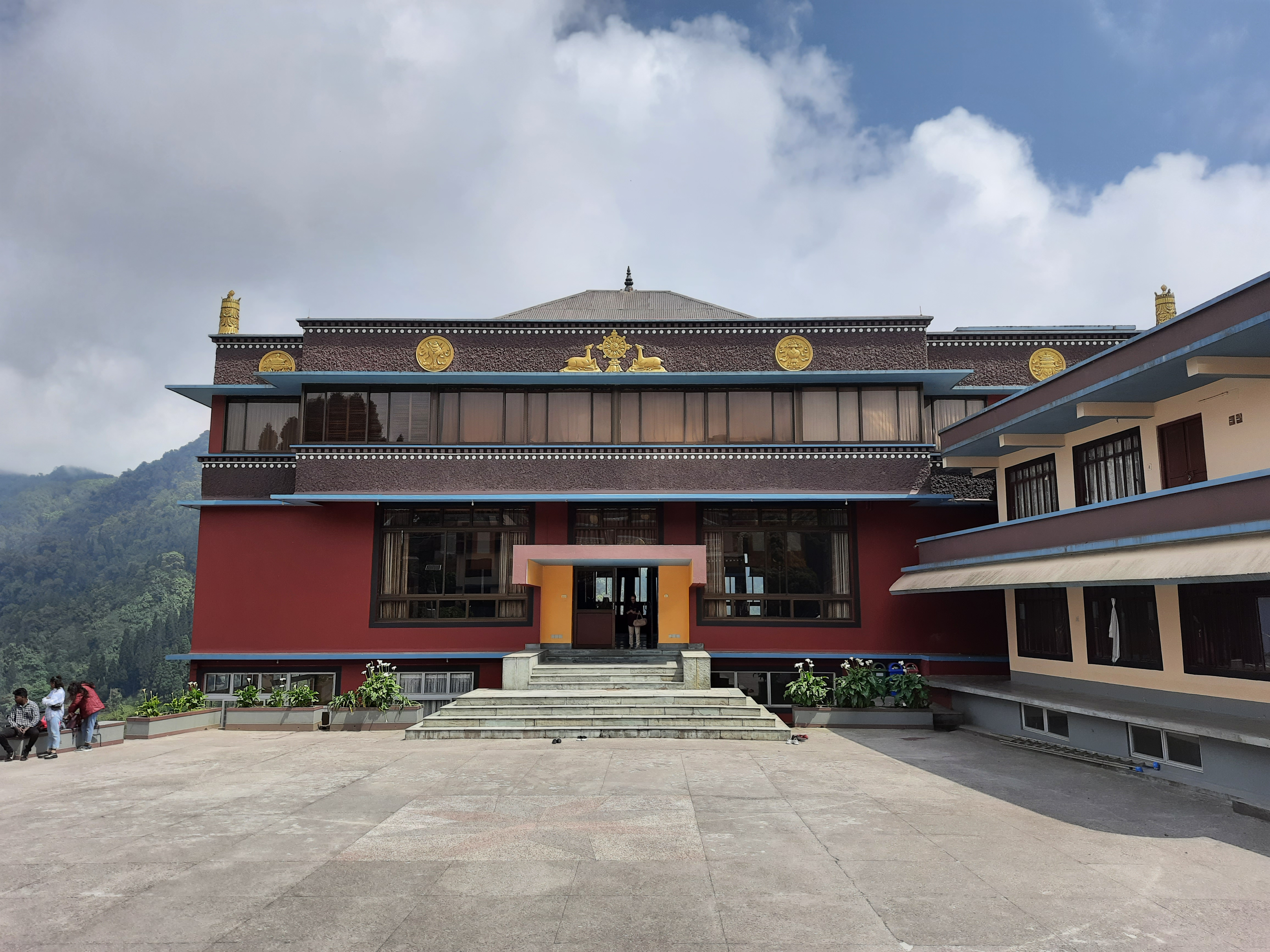
Lava Monastery

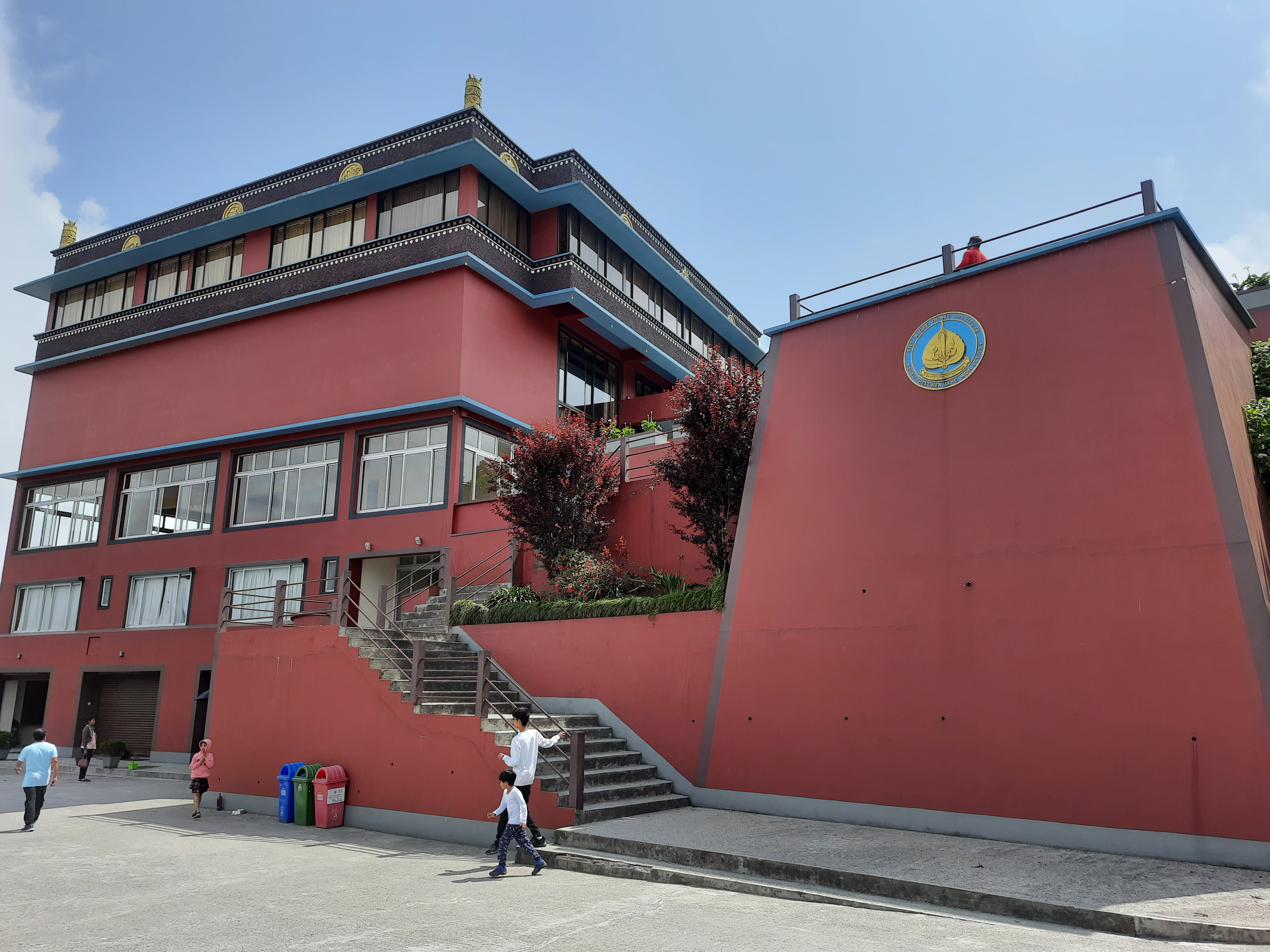
Lava Monastery

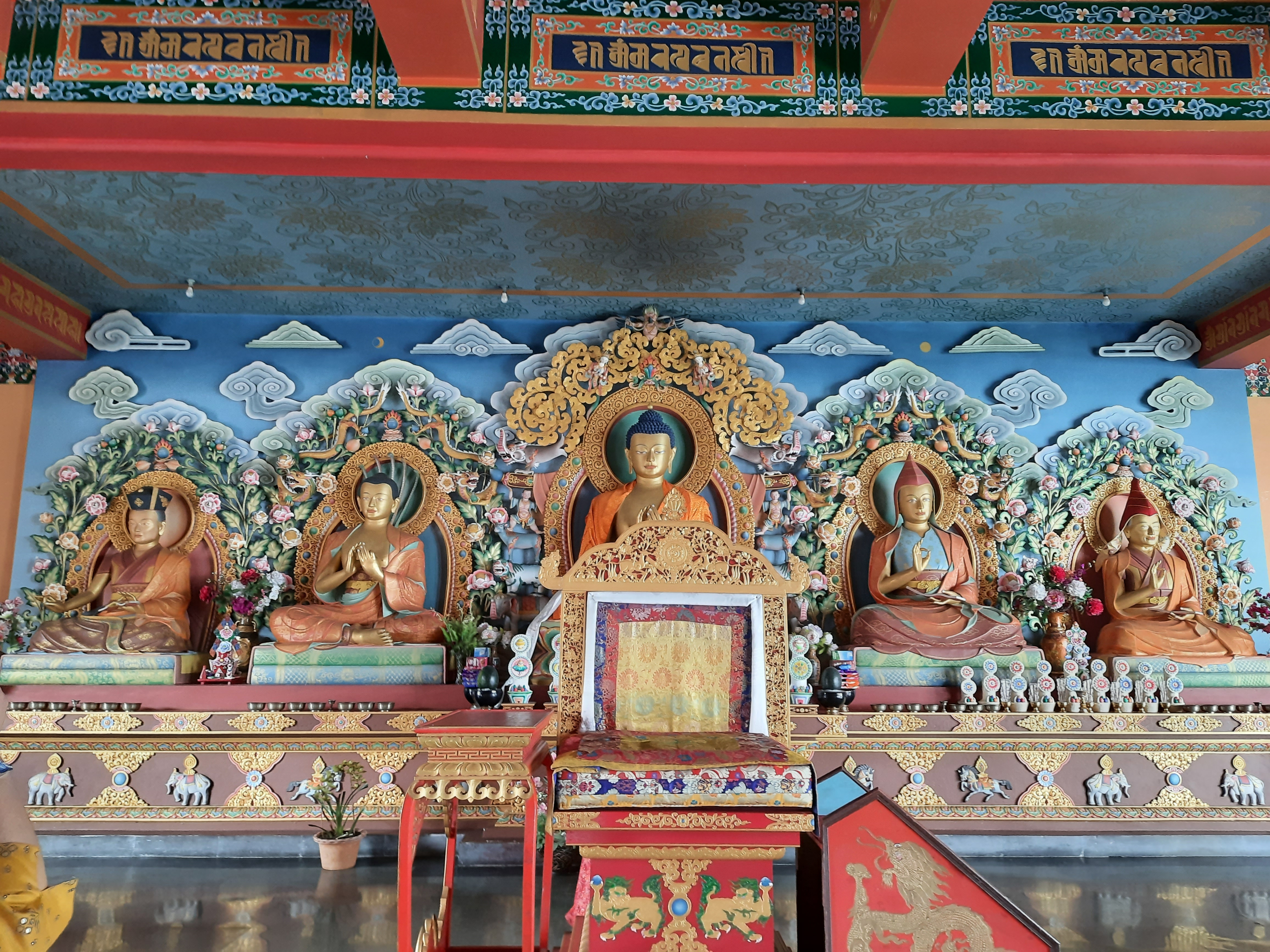
Inside Lava Monastery

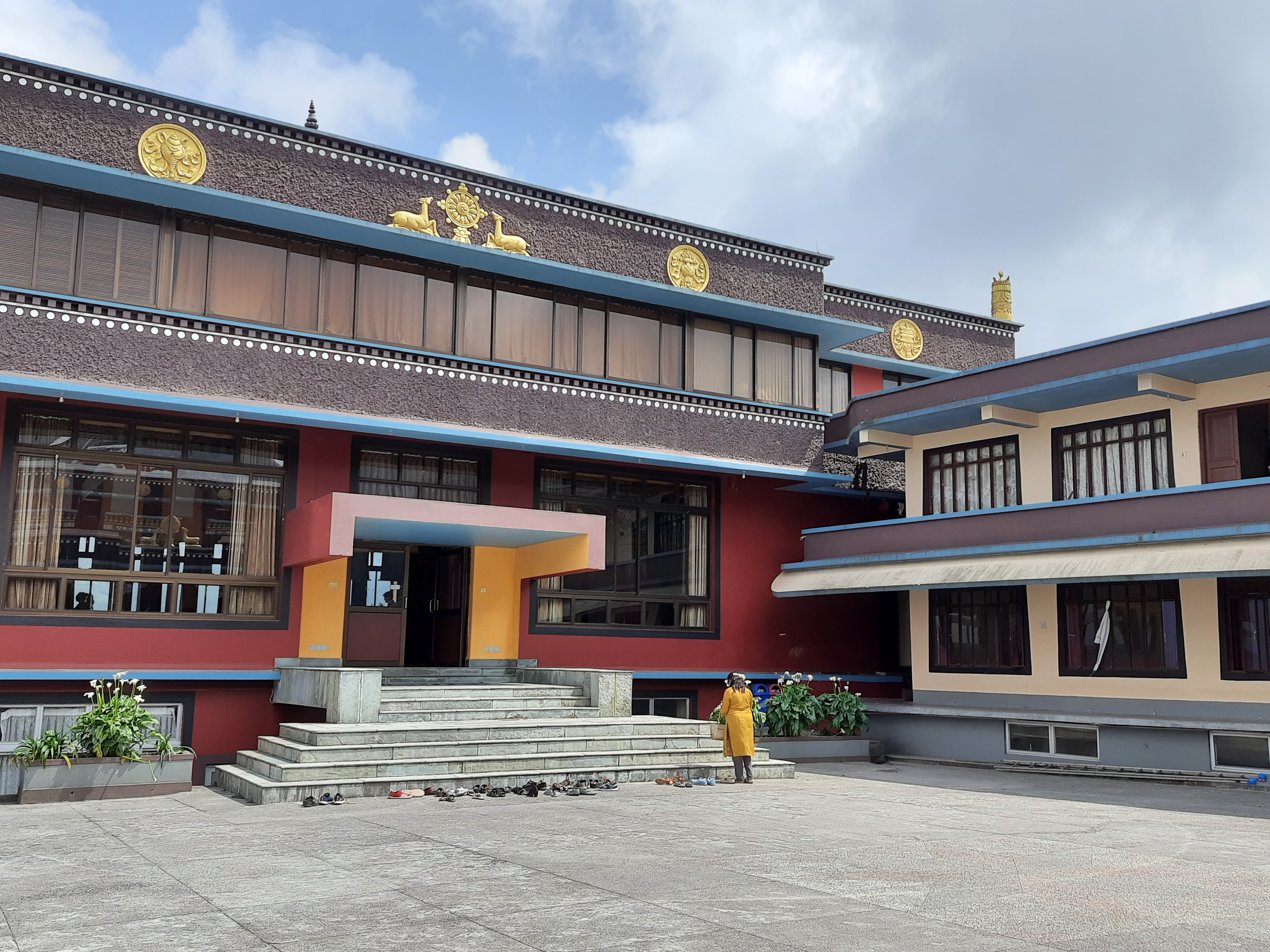
Lava Monastery

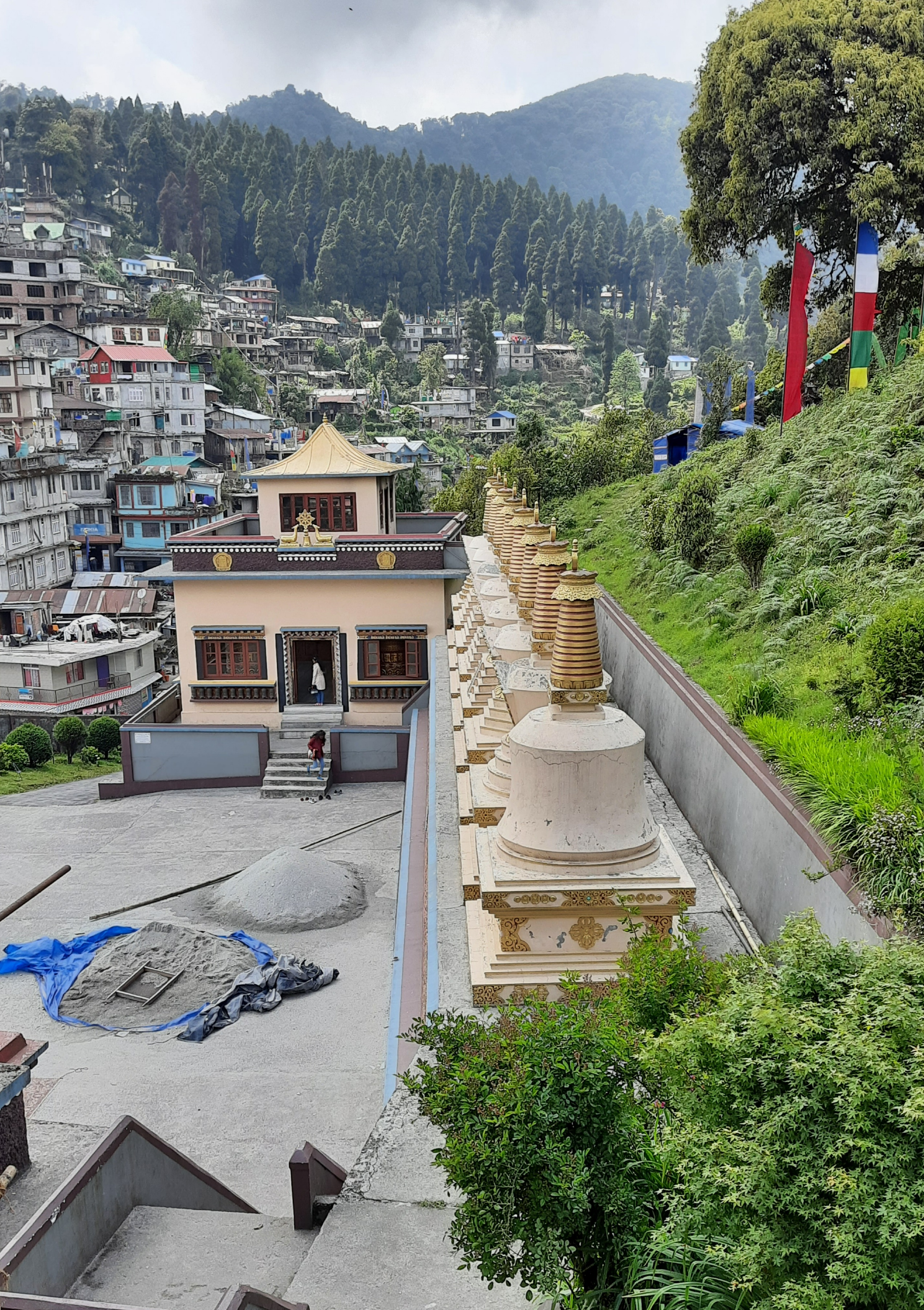
Mane Lhakhang
