= Baba Baby O =

2022 Indian Bengali-language film by Aritra Mukherjee

- Theatrical release poster
- Directed by: Aritra Mukherjee
- Written by: Zinia Sen
- Produced by: Shiboprosad Mukherjee; Nandita Roy
- Starring: Jisshu Sengupta; Solanki Roy
- Cinematography: Subhankar Bhar (ISC)
- Edited by: Moloy Laha
- Music by: Chamok Hasan; Amit-Ishan
- Production company: Windows Production
- Distributed by: Windows Production
- Release dates: January 2022 (Jaipur Film Festival); 4 February 2022 (India)
- Running time: 135 minutes
- Country: India
- Language: Bengali

Baba Baby O is a 2022 Indian Bengali-language drama film directed by Aritra Mukherjee. The film is produced by Shiboprosad Mukherjee and Nandita Roy under the banner of Windows Production. The film stars Jisshu Sengupta and Solanki Roy in lead roles.

== Plot ==
40-something Megh decides to have babies through surrogacy. His life takes a u-turn when he meets Brishti. The film tries to highlight that love can happen anywhere, anytime.

The film begins with Megh becoming a father through surrogacy to two little boys (later referred to as Potol-Posto). Due to his constant denial and disinterest in marriage, his father comes to doubt if he is gay and in a relationship with his best friend. However he reveals that his disinterest is not only due to his age but also due to rejection he faced from his former girlfriend due to his love and desire for children.

Megh goes to a toy shop to buy toys for his boys, sees Brishti scolding a man for his indecent comments. Megh, as his caring nature suggests, rescues Brishti from the ruckus, also having developed a crush on her. Through numerous encounters henceforth, he helps Brishti in various ways. It is eventually revealed that Brishti has a sour relationship with her mother due to her second marriage as she believes her mother dumped her father, while it is the vice versa. It is also revealed that she hates kids as she believes they are irrational and impractical unlike adults which breaks Megh's heart. Enter Souvik, Brishti's boyfriend, who plans to shift to Sydney with Brishti and sell the house and toy shop that Brishti and her mother have inherited from the latter's second marriage. This makes Brishti's mother furious and Brishti leaves the house with Souvik. Brishti seeks help from Megh and he finds them an apartment beside his own flat for rent. A beautiful relationship develops between Megh's parents, Brishti and Megh's children, whom Brishti begins to accept.

We see the constant neglect that Souvik offers in the relationship to Brishti, not being there when she needs him the most, unlike Megh, who always open heartedly tries to hear Brishti out. Brishti finds a letter in her luggage which was written by her biological father to her mother before she got married for the second time, stating that he has happily settled again and Brishti must not know of how he has dumped her. Brishti regrets not accepting her adoptive father and her mother's marriage when her adoptive father was actually alive. She tries to contact Souvik who is out of the house, but not getting any support from him, calls Megh instead. Megh consoles her. Brishi reconciles with her mother.

Some days later, as Brishti is about to leave for Sydney with Souvik, her mother shows her a picture of Megh and approves him over Souvik, as he kept sending Brishti's pictures to her mother all the while that she was away. Brishti and Souvik have lunch at Megh's place and Brishti leaves for Sydney with a heavy heart. Megh realises how important Brishti is to him and goes to stop her when his parents motivate him, however in vain. He returns home only, to find Brishti waiting for him. She tells him that she was always confused if Megh was her father or her lover due to his fatherly nature, hinting of the void of the fatherly love that she had always craved for. Megh assures her that she is free to love him in whatever way. Brishti says she might not be a good mother to Potol Posto but can be a good friend to them. Megh tells her that every kind of love has an affection and she is free to mould their children in any way she wants. Megh and Brishti reconcile, a happy family scene is shown, hinting at their marriage and love filled life with a sense of freedom ahead. However, the moment Megh is back, another Megh is portrayed imagining the entire thing with all the other cast ignoring him, leaving it unclear if Brishti did return.

== Cast ==
- Jisshu Sengupta as Megh Roddur Chatterjee
- Solanki Roy as Brishti Roy
- Bidipta Chakraborty as Brishti's mother
- Gourab Chatterjee as Souvik, Brishti's fiance
- Rajat Ganguly as Megh's father
- Reshmi Sen as Megh's mother
- Mainak Banerjee as Raja, Megh's friend

== Soundtrack ==
Baba Baby O

Soundtrack album by Chamok Hasan, Amit-Ishan
- Released: 22 December 2021
- Recorded: 2021
- Genre: Film soundtrack
- Length: 16:31
- Language: Bengali
- Label: Times Music Bangla

The background score and the soundtracks are composed by Chamok Hasan, Amit-Ishan and lyrics are penned by Chamok Hasan, Ritam Sen and Firoza Bonhi

Track listing
No.	Title	Lyrics	Music	Singer	Length
1.	"Ei Mayabi Chander Raate"	Chamok Hasan; Firoza Bonhi	Chamok Hasan	Chamok Hasan; Ikkshita Mukherjee; Hemlata Chakraborty; Barnomala	3:22
2.	"RongMoshal"	Ritam Sen	Amit-Ishan	Ishan Mitra	3:17
3.	"Baba Howa Eto Soja Noy"	Chamok Hasan	Chamok Hasan	Anindya Chatterjee	3:36
4.	"Ei Mayabi Chander Raate(Reprise Version)"	Chamok Hasan; Firoza Bonhi	Chamok Hasan	Chamok Hasan; Ikkshita Mukherjee; Hemlata Chakraborty; Barnomala	3:15
5.	"Badhone Bandhibo"	Amit Chatterjee	Amit-Ishan	Sovan Ganguly; Sanchari Sengupta	3:01
Total length:					16:31

== Release ==
The film released on 4 February 2022.

== Reception ==
=== Critical reception ===
Jaya Biswas of The Times of India rated the film 3/5 stars and wrote "This film celebrates fatherhood by following the everyday struggles of a man trying to navigate problems of his love life, family and career to the best of his abilities." She appreciated Jisshu and Solanki's respective performances, the performance of the supporting cast, Rajat Ganguly and Mainak Banerjee's comic timing and the music but bemoaned Jisshu and Solanki's weak chemistry, slow pace, predictable storyline, poor editing and not-so-strong dialogues.

Abir Chatterjee reviewed the film on behalf of Anandabazar Patrika and opined "Looking at the film, I feel that no relationship progresses according to a familiar pattern, but rather new equations are constantly being created. Love is no exception." He praised the topic of the film, Jisshu and Solanki's performances, their chemistry, the supporting cast, the music, the direction and the cinematography.

Suvo Pyne of High on Films reviewed the film and summarized "In the end, it would be another fare of Nandita Roy and Shiboprosad Mukherjee that would only be enjoyed by the viewers with a proclivity for their films. The rest, not so much I would presume." He praised the performance of Jisshu Sengupta and Solanki Roy, and the performance of the supporting cast but criticized the bare minimum plotline, stringent execution, the lack of proper exploration about the single father idea, the film's resort to routine family drama trope, similar dialogues and character writing for all the actors and the unnecessary sub-plots.

Shampali Moulik of Sangbad Pratidin reviewed the film and highlighted "On one side, the film has a strong focal point, but the other side is that the film becomes didactic while presenting an idea. It makes the film unnecessarily burdened and wipes out the joy of watching it." She praised the film's portrayal of the social taboos, the intertwined cinematography between unequal age romance and single fatherhood, the dialogues, the performance of the whole cast, the direction and the soundtrack.

== Accolades ==
- Screened at the 14th Jaipur International Film Festival
