= Fatafati =

2023 Indian Bengali film

- Theatrical release poster
- Directed by: Aritra Mukherjee
- Screenplay by: Zinia Sen
- Dialogues by: Samragnee Bandyopadhyay
- Story by: Zinia Sen
- Produced by: Nandita Roy; Shiboprosad Mukherjee
- Starring: Ritabhari Chakraborty; Abir Chatterjee
- Cinematography: Aalok Maiti
- Edited by: Subhajit Singha
- Music by: Anindya Chatterjee
- Production company: Windows Production
- Release date: May 12, 2023
- Running time: 171 minutes
- Country: India
- Language: Bengali

Fatafati (transl. Awesome) is a 2023 Indian Bengali-language fashion drama film directed by Aritra Mukherjee. The film is produced by Nandita Roy and Shiboprosad Mukherjee under the banner of Windows Production. The film stars Ritabhari Chakraborty and Abir Chatterjee as leads. The film revolves around body shaming in the society. The film was released on 12 May 2023. It was a box office success and an unexpected hit at the box office.

== Plot ==
Phullora Bhaduri is a tailor by profession, who lives in Dhulishohor with her husband, Bachospoti, mother-in-law Behula and brother-in-law Gogol. Because of her body weight, she often attracts snide remarks from people. Despite being told by model Bikki Sen and people in general that fashion is not for the fat, she starts writing about designs that suit all body types. Gogol, in a bid to practise translation from Bengali to English, publishes her writings online and the Instagram handle, Fatafati, becomes a rage overnight. While the family goes through a financial crisis, Phullora gets offers to endorse brands through Instagram. Can Phullora, who has an alternative name for social media and herself, suffers from body image issues, reclaim her identity and tell the world who she is?

== Cast ==
- Ritabhari Chakraborty as Phullora Bhaduri
- Abir Chatterjee as Bachaspati Bhaduri
- Swastika Dutta as Vicky Sen
- Soma Chakraborty
- Raktim Samanta
- Arijita Mukhopadhyay
- Debnath Chatterjee
- Debosree Ganguly
- Sanghasree Sinha
- Asmee Ghosh
- Loknath Dey
- Shreya Roy
- Sushmita Roy

== Soundtrack ==
No.	Title	Lyrics	Music	Singer(s)	Length
1.	"Jani Okaron"	Ritam Sen	Amit Chatterjee	Antara Mitra, Ishan Mitra	4:36
2.	"Swapno Bonar Somoy (Male)"	Chamok Hasan	Chamok Hasan	Chamok Hasan	3:21
3.	"Swapno Bonar Somoy (Female)"	Chamok Hasan	Chamok Hasan	Anwesshaa	3:20
4.	"Jotodur Tumi"	Ritam Sen	Amit Chatterjee	Javed Ali	4:12
5.	"O Phullora"	Anindya Chattopadhyay	Anindya Chattopadhyay	Khnada Bhattacherjee, Pousali Banerjee, Shuchismita Chakraborty, Paramita Mallick	3:55
Total length:					19:24

== Reception ==
Anindita Mukherjee of India Today rated this film 3 stars out of 5 stars and noted "‘Fatafati’ is more than just a tale of platonic love; it is a story of fighting body image issues and finding self-acceptance. This film shows that it's crucial to look beyond societal norms and appreciate the beauty within." Ujjainee Roy of The Times of India rated this film 3 stars out of 5 stars and noted "Some may deem it a one-time watch but that shouldn't take away from the film's creative merits. Watch it for the laughs and the drama if you have some time to kill this week."

== Release ==
The film was theatrically released on 12 May 2023, and later released on the OTT platform Sony Liv on 4 August 2023 in Bengali along with dubbed version in Hindi, Tamil, Telugu, Malayalam & Kannada.
