= Abul Ahsan Chowdhury =

Abul Ahsan Choudhury
- আবুল আহসান চৌধুরী
- Born: January 13, 1953 (age 73); Mazampur, Kushtia, East Bengal, Dominion of Pakistan
- Education: University of Dhaka
- Occupation: Professor of Islamic University, Bangladesh
- Writing career
- Subjects: Folklore, Lalon music
- Notable works: Swadesh Amar Bangla (1971); Nilkantha Jiban Tumi (1974)
- Notable awards: Bangla Academy Literary Award, Full List

Abul Ahsan Choudhury (born January 13, 1953) is a poet, researcher, and folklorist of Bangladesh. He is the senior professor of the Department of Bengali at the Islamic University, Bangladesh. He is active in research and academic matters at home and abroad. He received a Bangla Academy Literary Award in 2009.

== Biography ==
Choudhury was born in Mazampur, Kushtia, Bangladesh. His father, Fazlul Bari Chowdhury, was a writer, social worker, and former honorary magistrate. His mother is Saleha Khatun. He received his Bachelor of Arts degree from the University of Dhaka in 1975, graduating with honours. He received his Master of Arts degree in 1976 and his Ph.D. from the same university in 1995.

He has been

- Features editor, The Weekly Swadhin Bangla (newspaper on the Liberation War) — 1971
- Editor, The Weekly Jagoroni, Kushtia, Bangladesh — 1972
- Editor, Loko Sahitya Patrika (quarterly), Kushtia, Bangladesh — 1975–84
- Editor, The Islamic University Studies, Islamic University, Kushtia, Bangladesh — 998
- Editor, Islami Biswabidyalaya Barta (quarterly), Islamic University, Kushtia, Bangladesh — 2000
- Edited three books on Hason Raja: Proshongo Hason Raja, Hason Rajar Gan and Hason Raja: The minstrel of the mystic soil — 2009

== Publications ==
Choudhury has published two books of poetry, Swadesh Amar Bangla (1971) and Nilkantha Jiban Tumi (1974), and a range of research publications, including on Fakir Lalon Shah, Mir Mosharraf Hossain and Kangal Harinath Mazumder. He also writes a newspaper column.

== Awards ==
- Lalon Award, West Bengal Lalon Mela Shomittee, India, 2000
- Sayed Abdur Rob Sambardhana, Faridpur, 2001
- Bangiya Sahitya Parishad Award, Kolkata, 2008
- Bangla Academy Literary Award, 2009
