= Tarader Shesh Tarpon =

Indian web series

- Genre: Documentary
- Directed by: Aritra Mukherjee
- Country of origin: India
- Original language: Bengali
- No. of seasons: 1
- No. of episodes: 12

Production
- Production company: Windows Production House

Original release
- Release: 17 September – 9 October 2020

Tarader Shesh Tarpon is a Bengali web series released on 17 September 2020 on the Bengali OTT platform hoichoi. Directed by Aritra Mukherjee and produced by Windows Production the series is a documentary one where the audience memorizes the celebrated personalities who are not with us. They have touched our hearts through their work but unfortunately, we lost them in recent times.

== Premise ==
In Bengali tradition, tarpon refers to offering prayers in memory of deceased ancestors; drawing on that custom, the series looks back at the lives and work of deceased Bengali and Indian public figures. Sports journalist Gautam Bhattacharya hosts the show, interviewing colleagues and public figures such as Prosenjit Chatterjee, Jisshu Sengupta, Sourav Ganguly, and Srijit Mukherjee about each person's career and life.

== Speakers ==
- Gautam Bhattacharya
- Sourav Ganguly
- Prosenjit Chatterjee
- Jisshu Sengupta
- Srijit Mukherjee
- Saswata Chatterjee
- Soumitra Chattopadhyay

== Episodes ==
Series	Episodes	Originally released
1	12	17 September 2020

== Seasons ==
SEASON 1 (2020)

On 17 September 2020, hoichoi released the first four episodes of the web series. Music directed by Indraadip Dasgupta

No.	Title	Directed by	Original release date
1	"Subimal Goswami"	Aritra Mukherjee	17 September 2020
2	"PK Banerjee"	Aritra Mukherjee	17 September 2020
3	"Rituparno Ghosh"	Aritra Mukherjee	17 September 2020
4	"Gopal Bose"	Aritra Mukherjee	17 September 2020
5	"Sunil Gangopadhyay"	Aritra Mukherjee	25 September 2020
6	"Sushant Singh Rajput"	Aritra Mukherjee	25 September 2020
7	"Ajay Bose"	Aritra Mukherjee	25 September 2020
8	"Kalikaprasad"	Aritra Mukherjee	2 October 2020
9	"Krishanu De"	Aritra Mukherjee	2 October 2020
10	"Mahua Lahiri"	Aritra Mukherjee	2 October 2020
11	"Tapas Paul"	Aritra Mukherjee	9 October 2020
12	"Supriya Devi"	Aritra Mukherjee	9 October 2020

SEASON 2 (2021)

In 2021, the second season of the series was released. Music directed by Amit-Ishaan

Episode number	Title	Director	Release date
1	Soumitra Chatterjee	Aritra Mukherjee	6 October 2021
2	Amal Dutta		
3	Swatilekha Sengupta		
4	Sankha Ghosh		
5	Budhhadeb Dasgupta		11 October 2021
6	Mrinal Sen		
7	Mahua Roy Choudhury		
8	Irfan Khan		

== Reception ==
A review in The Times of India wrote: "Overall, Tarader Shesh Tarpon is a very engaging watch despite being biographical as it doesn’t try too hard to put them on a pedestal. Instead, it focuses on the basic fact that they were just human, with lives full of ups, downs, bitterness and happiness and of course, success."
