= Brahma Janen Gopon Kommoti =

2020 Indian Bengali drama film

- Theatrical release poster
- Directed by: Aritra Mukherjee
- Written by: Zinia Sen
- Screenplay by: Zinia Sen
- Produced by: Nandita Roy; Shiboprosad Mukherjee
- Starring: Ritabhari Chakraborty; Soham Majumdar
- Cinematography: Aalok Maiti
- Edited by: Moloy Laha
- Music by: Rudraneel Chowdhury
- Production company: Windows Production
- Release date: 6 March 2020
- Running time: 127 minutes
- Country: India
- Language: Bengali
- Budget: 72 Lakhs
- Box office: est. 1 crore

Brahma Janen Gopon Kommoti is a 2020 Indian Bengali social drama film, which is the directorial debut of Aritra Mukherjee and produced by Windows Production. It stars Ritabhari Chakraborty and Soham Majumdar in the lead roles while Ambarish Bhattacharya, Manasi Sinha and Subhasish Mukherjee play other pivotal roles. This film was released on 6 March 2020.

== Synopsis ==
The film revolves around the life of Shabari and her right to performing priesthood, dealing with menstrual taboos and standing up against the concept of Kanyadan. Shabari is a lecturer, performing artiste and priest. She picked up the art of priesthood from her father. When a chance encounter with Vikramaditya at a college function leads to a marriage proposal, she tells the would-be groom that she does puja among other things. Her words are misinterpreted for the usual puja that women perform at home. After her marriage, Shabari is forced to keep her identity under wraps due to the stark differences between her worlds, pre and post marriage. Will she be able to continue being a priest against all odds or will she be forced to give up faced with opposition by a patriarchal society? All the more when women in their menstrual age are not allowed to perform pujas! The story makes one ponder over the outdated rites and rituals and questions the gender imbalance in our society.

== Cast ==
- Ritabhari Chakraborty as Shabari, the only female priest in West Bengal
- Soham Majumdar as Bikramaditya
- Manasi Sinha as Gurudasi
- Subhasish Mukherjee as Purohit Moshai
- Soma Banerjee as Amrabati
- Ambarish Bhattacharya as Pratapaditya
- Iman Chakraborty as Uma in a Special Appearance
- Tanika Basu

== Release ==
It was theatrically released on 6 March 2020. It had a short theatrical run until the 25th of March, 2020, due to the country-wide lockdown for COVID-19. However, it packed houses across Bengal in that short period of time. The film enjoyed 50+ houseful shows back to back on the first Sunday of its release, even some theatres had back to back packed shows. Later it had its world television premiere on 14th of February, 2021 and is also available on OTT platforms. It was screened at the 51st International Film Festival of India in January 2021 in the Indian Panorama section.

== Soundtrack ==
Brahma Janen Gopon Kommoti

Soundtrack album by Anindya Chatterjee
- Released: 6 March 2020
- Recorded: 2019
- Genre: Feature film soundtrack
- Length: 11:24
- Language: Bengali
- Label: INRECO

The soundtrack is composed by Anindya Chatterjee on his own lyrics.

Track list
No.	Title	Singer	Length
1.	"Yadidang Whridayang"	Ujjaini Mukherjee	3:51
2.	"Kon Gopone"	Surangana Bandyopadhay	3:23
3.	"Tui Chol"	Somlata Acharyya Choudhury	3:29
4.	"Biya Legeche" (Chorus: Mouli Bhattacharya)	Singer: Lagnajita Chakraborty	3:32
Total length:			14:25

== Reception ==
=== Critical reception ===
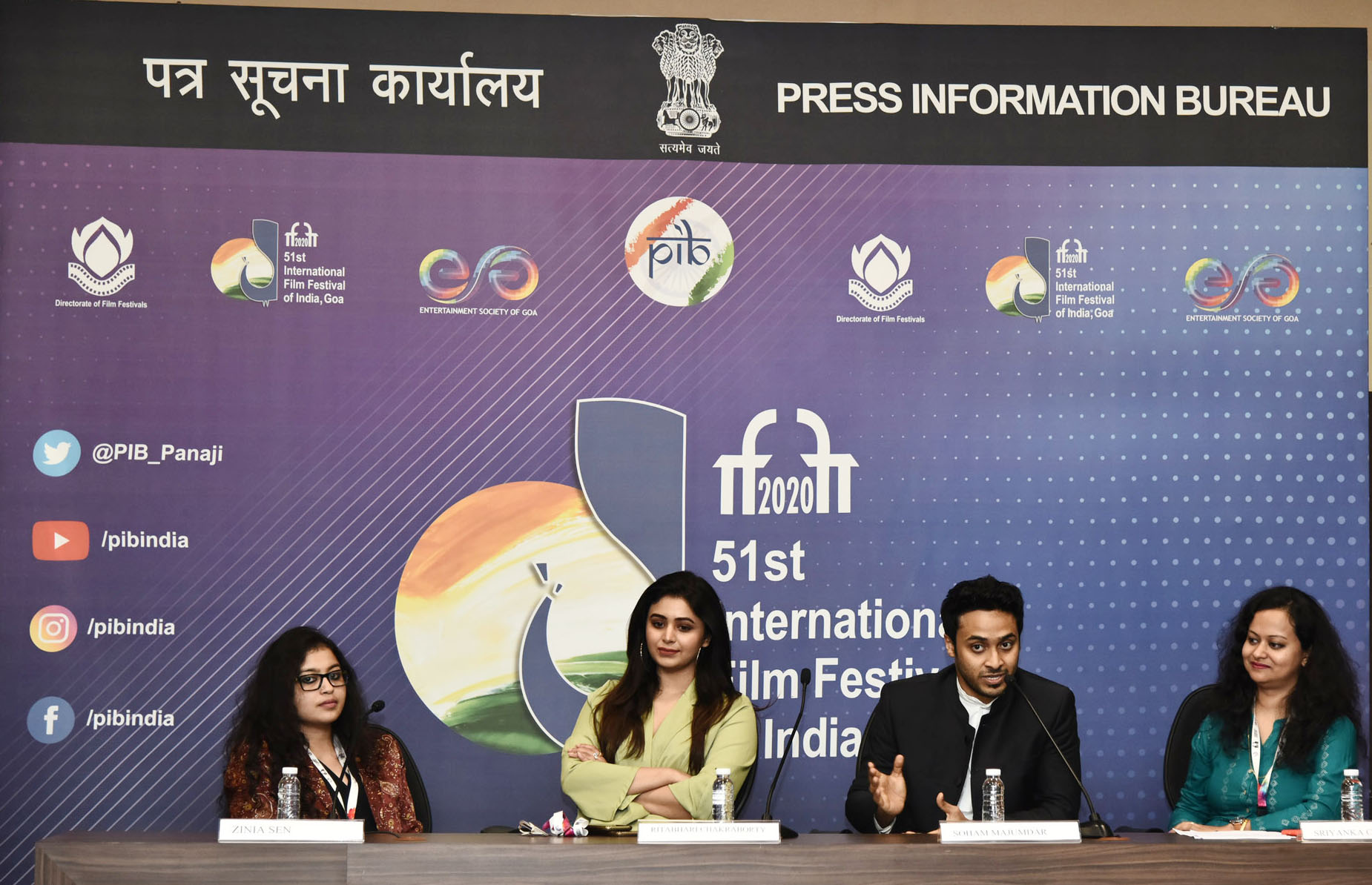
Ritabhari Chakraborty and Soham Majumdar addressing a Press Conference, during the 51st International Film Festival of India in Panaji, Goa on 18 January 2021

Debolina Sen of The Times of India rated the film 3/5 stars and wrote "Brahma Janen Gopon Kommoti stresses on gender-bending roles, layered with humour, which could have been less loud but appears entertaining because of the lighter route it takes to spread awareness on serious topic." She praised the performance of the actors but criticized Ritabhari's sketchy struggles, excessive melodrama in certain parts, poor story binding, bad interval positioning, repetitive jokes, long runtime, below par dialogues and the easy overcoming of the obstacles in the marriage of Ritabhari's character.

A critic from the The Indian Express rated the film 3/5 stars and opined "It is not known whether this film will make a difference before Women's Day. However, the society's equality-inequality, need-unnecessity, right-wrong will definitely be measured once on the scales." The critic praised the screenplay, Mukherjee's direction and Ritabhari's performance but bemoaned the weak soundtrack.

Sisir Roy of Anandabazar Patrika rated the film 6/10 stars and wrote "The film had a good idea, a good story, good dialogues and a good screenplay but suffered from poor execution." He appreciated Ritabhari's performance but bemoaned multiple loose ends in the plotline, weak climax, excessive melodrama and easy win over obstacles. Manabi Banerjee of the same news outlet reviewed the film and praised it's core idea of fighting against societal superstitions against women. Sandipta Bhanja of Sangbad Pratidin reviewed the film and applauded the director's attempt in using an issue like priesthood to battle the age old superstitions against women.

== Controversy ==
Justice Sabyasachi Bhattacharyya's six-page order on March 6 nullified a plea against the film at the Calcutta High Court for "hurting Hindu religious sentiments" by linking Brahma with 'gopon kommoti', which means "the secret act". Petitioner Subhadep Adhikari had also argued that the filmmakers should be prosecuted under penal sections which deal with hurting religious sentiment with a malicious intent.

Writer Debarati Mukhopadhyay claimed that the plot of the movie was copied from her book Diotima without giving any attributions. Shiboprosad Mukherjee and Nandita Roy informed that Debarati's claim was baseless and Windows Production filed a suit of 10 crores against her. Mukhopadhyay filed a counter suit against the production house for plagiarism, copyright violation worth 50 crores. Later, she filed another defamation suit against the script writer of the film for humiliating her.
