= Kolakham =

Kolakham KolKham Kolbong
- Village
- Nickname: Rai Gaon
- Location in West Bengal, India Kolakham (India)
- Coordinates: 27°06′05″N 88°40′40″E
- Country: India
- State: West Bengal
- District: Kalimpong
- Founder: Ujir Man Rai Samsuhang
- Named for: traditional technique of oil production
- Time zone: UTC+5:30 (IST)
- Vehicle registration: WB
- Lok Sabha constituency: Darjeeling
- Vidhan Sabha constituency: Kalimpong
- Website: kalimpongdistrict.in

Kolakham is a village in the Kalimpong II CD block in the Kalimpong Sadar subdivision of Kalimpong district in the state of West Bengal, India.

== Geography ==
Places in the Kalimpong Sadar subdivision in Kalimpong district
CT: census town, R: rural/ urban centre, M: municipality, F: facility, NP: national park
Abbreviations used in names – TG for tea garden (town/village)
Owing to space constraints in the small map, the actual locations in a larger map may vary slightly.

=== Location ===
Kolakham is located at 27°06′05″N 88°40′40″E.

Kolakham is located in the Neora Valley National Park. It has an average altitude of 1981 meters (6500 ft). It is located 8 km from Lava and 38 km from Kalimpong.

=== Area overview ===
The map above shows the Kalimpong Sadar subdivision of Kalimpong district. Physiographically, this area forms the Kalimpong Range, with the average elevation varying from 300 to 3,000 metres (980 to 9,840 ft). This region is characterized by abruptly rising hills and numerous small streams. It is a predominantly rural area with 77.67% of the population living in rural areas and only 22.23% living in the urban areas. While Kalimpong is the only municipality, Dungra is the sole census town in the entire area. The economy is agro-based and there are six tea gardens in the Gorubathan CD block. In 2011, Kalimpong subdivision had a literacy rate of 81.85%, comparable with the highest levels of literacy in the districts of the state. While the first degree college in the subdivision was established at Kalimpong in 1962 the entire subdivision (and now the entire district), other than the head-quarters, had to wait till as late as 2015 (more than half a century) to have their first degree colleges at Pedong and Gorubathan.

Note: The map above presents some of the notable locations in the subdivision. All places marked in the map are linked in the larger full screen map.
