= Lava, West Bengal =

Village Hill station in West Bengal, India

Lava, Kalimpong
- Town
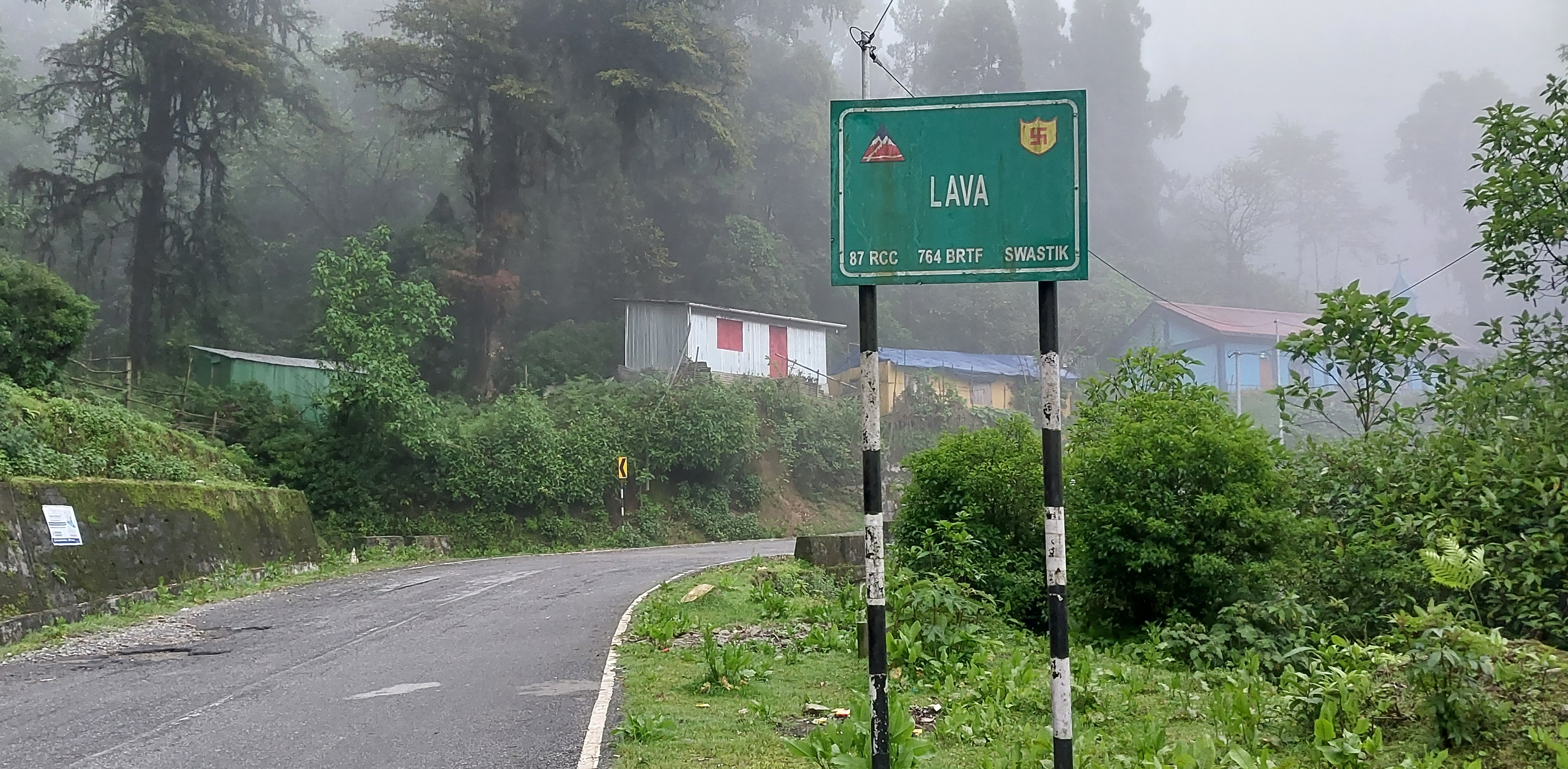
- A clock in the main town square

- Location of Lava in West Bengal Lava, Kalimpong (India)
- Coordinates: 27°05′10″N 88°39′38″E
- Country: India
- State: West Bengal
- District: Kalimpong
- Elevation: 2,200 m (7,200 ft)

Population (2011)
  - Total: 1,836

Languages
  - Official: Nepali, English
- Time zone: UTC+5:30 (IST)
- PIN: 734 314
- Telephone code: 03552
- Vehicle registration: WB-78, 79
- Nearest city: Kalimpong, Malbazar
- Website: kalimpong.gov.in

Lava (also known as Lava Bazar) is a town in the Kalimpong II CD block in the Kalimpong subdivision of the Kalimpong district in the Indian state of West Bengal. As it lies in the high altitude, it is also visible from high altitude towns and villages of East Sikkim, high areas of Bhutan and also from Pakyong Airport. The climate of the town is usually very cold because of high altitude making it a perfect place for tourists during summer season.

== Geography ==
Places in the Kalimpong Sadar subdivision in Kalimpong district
CT: census town, R: rural/ urban centre, M: municipality, F: facility, NP: national park
Abbreviations used in names – TG for Tea Garden (town/village)
Owing to space constraints in the small map, the actual locations in a larger map may vary slightly

=== Location ===
Lava is located at 27°05′10″N 88°39′38″E.

=== Area overview ===
The map alongside shows the Kalimpong Sadar subdivision of Kalimpong district. Physiographically, this area forms the Kalimpong Range, with the average elevation varying from 300 to 3,000 metres (980 to 9,840 ft). This region is characterized by abruptly rising hills and numerous small streams. It is a predominantly rural area with 77.67% of the population living in rural areas and only 22.23% living in the urban areas. While Kalimpong is the only municipality, Dungra is the sole census town in the entire area. The economy is agro-based and there are 6 tea gardens in the Gorubathan CD block. In 2011, Kalimpong subdivision had a literacy rate of 81.85%, comparable with the highest levels of literacy in the districts of the state. While the first degree college in the subdivision was established at Kalimpong in 1962 the entire subdivision (and now the entire district), other than the head-quarters, had to wait till as late as 2015 (more than half a century) to have their first degree colleges at Pedong and Gorubathan.

Note: The map alongside presents some of the notable locations in the subdivision. All places marked in the map are linked in the larger full screen map.

=== Description of the place ===
Lava is a small hamlet situated 30 kilometres (19 mi) east of the town of Kalimpong through Algarah in Kalimpong district of the state of West Bengal, India. Lava is situated at an altitude of 7,200 feet (2,195 m). It is one of the few places in West Bengal to receive snow in winter. It is the entry point to the Virgin Neora Valley National Park from Kalimpong. The route to Lava is scenic with the change in vegetation from tropical deciduous to the wet alpine trees of fir, pine and birch. The verdant forests are a popular spot for picnicking, trekking and bird-watching. Lava has gradually become a favorite tourist destination. Temperature decreases below Zero Degree in Winter and increases up to Maximum 30 Degree Celsius in Summer. It is situated on the trade route to Tibet via the Chumbi Valley. Lava can be reach through Gorubathan from Damdim or Malbazar of Jalpaiguri District. Distance from Gorubathan is 50 kilometres. The Road is Wide, Smooth and full with Scenic Beauty in every turn. The new Road is Built by Border Roads Organisation (B.R.O.) of Defence Ministry of Government of India.

Wild animals such as the Himalayan black bear, Leopard, Wild Boar, Red Panda and barking deer are found in these parts. Some Royal Bengal Tiger was found and captured in Camera here in the Year 2015. A Buddhist Monastery is present on one of the hills of Lava. Notable sites include Changey Waterfalls, Rache-La, Kolakham and Kagyu Thekchen Ling Monastery.

== Demographics ==
According to the 2011 Census of India, Lava Bazar DIF had a total population of 1,836 of which 945 (51%) were males and 891 (49%) were females. There were 195 persons in the age range of 0 to 6 years. The total number of literate people in Lava Bazar DIF was 1,283 (78.18% of the population over 6 years).

== Tourism in Lava ==
Tourism in Lava includes places like the Neora Valley National Park, where the surrounding area is an destination for bird watchers. Because of the cold climate in the town and nearby areas, it is tourist destination during the summer season. The National Highway 717A passes through forests, deep valleys, rivers and, on top of the hills, Ambiok and other Tea Gardens. Lava also has sunrise view points, like Local Homestay and Kafer.

== Transport ==
Lava (9th mile) lies on National Highway-717A connecting Bagrakote to Gangtok via Pakyong Airport. Lava Bazaar lies on GREF road connecting Algarah to Damdim via Gorubathan.

Taxis, Jeeps, Buses etc are available from Labha to cities and towns like Kalimpong, Pedong, Rhenock, Algarah, Malbazar, Gorubathan, Siliguri etc.

The nearest railway station is Malbazar Junction 58 kilometres away, and the nearest airport is Pakyong Airport about 75-80 kilometres and Bagdogra International Airport around 110 kilometres.

== Gallery ==
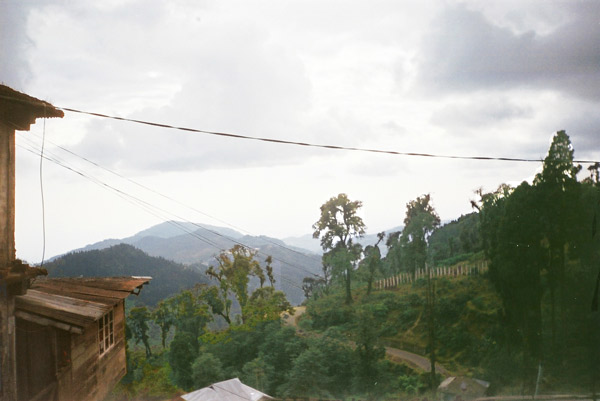
View from the town of Lava

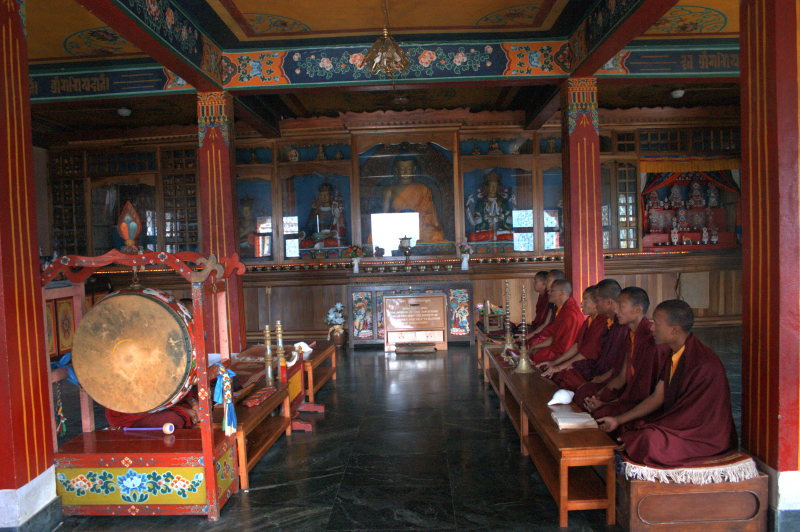
Buddhist Monastery in Lava

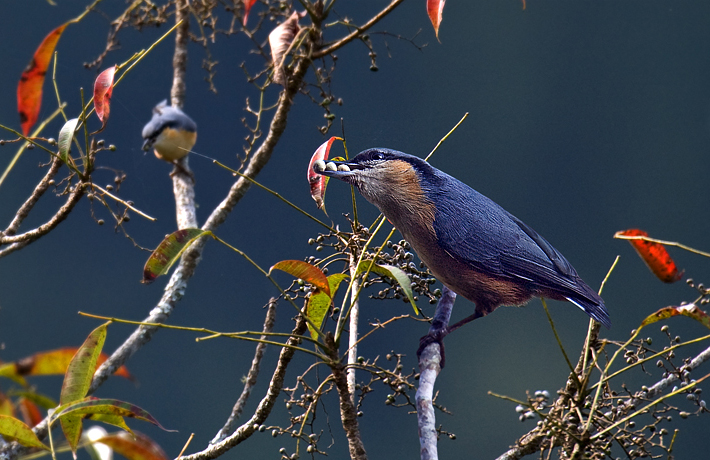
Chestnut bellied Nuthatch

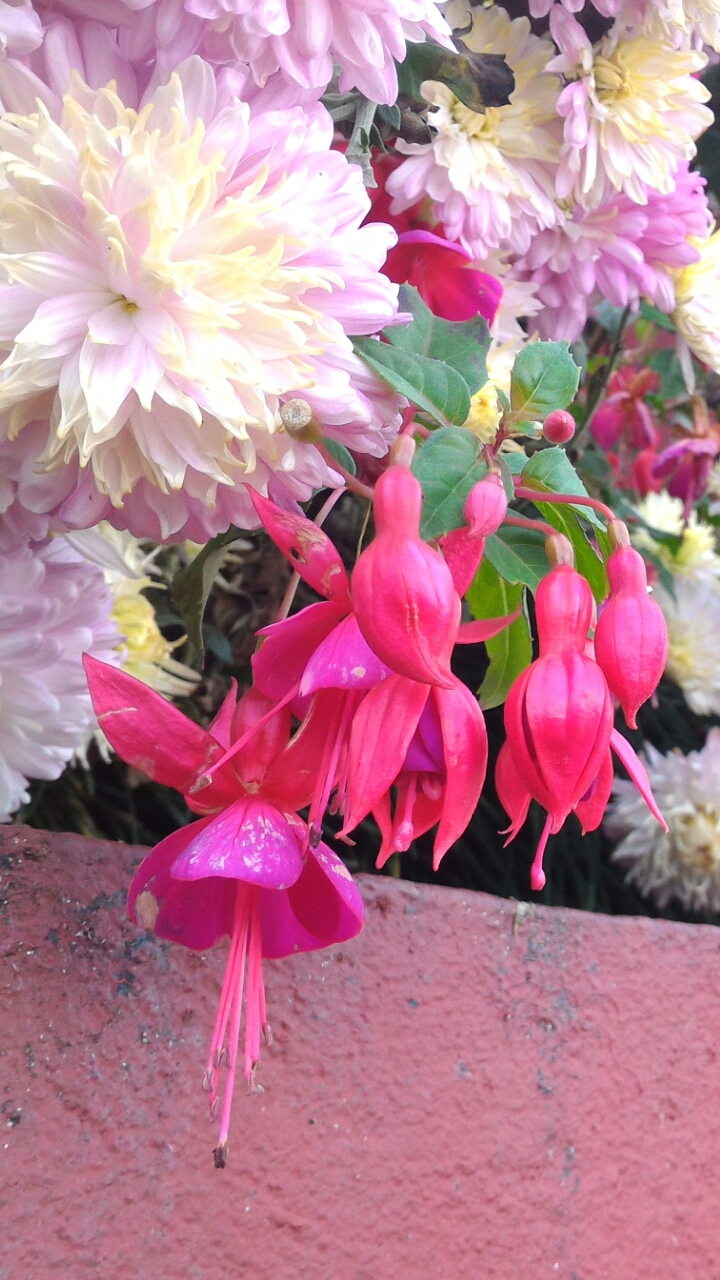
Flowers in Lava Monastery

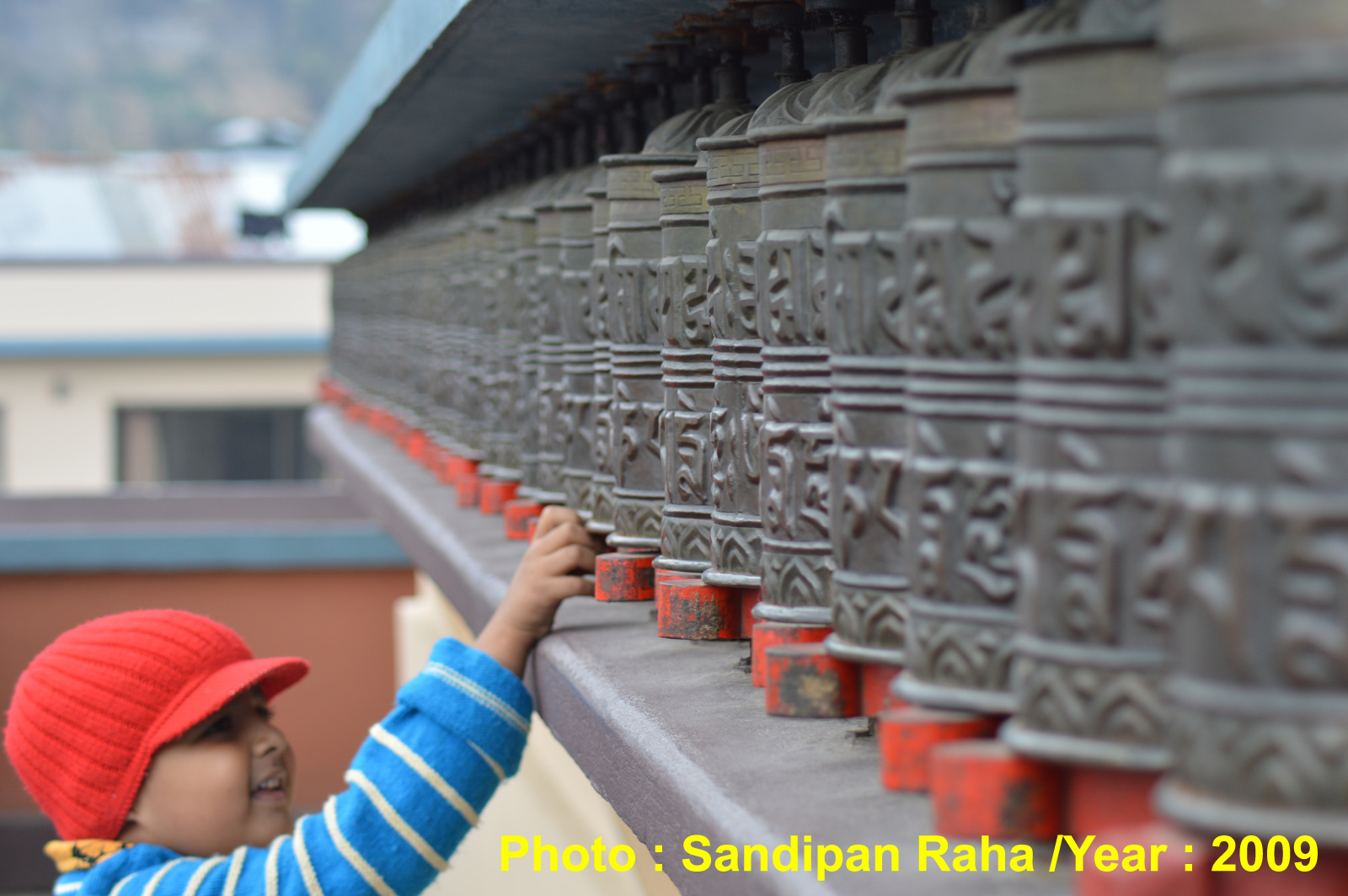
Holy Child at Kagyu Thek Chen Ling Monastery Year- 2009

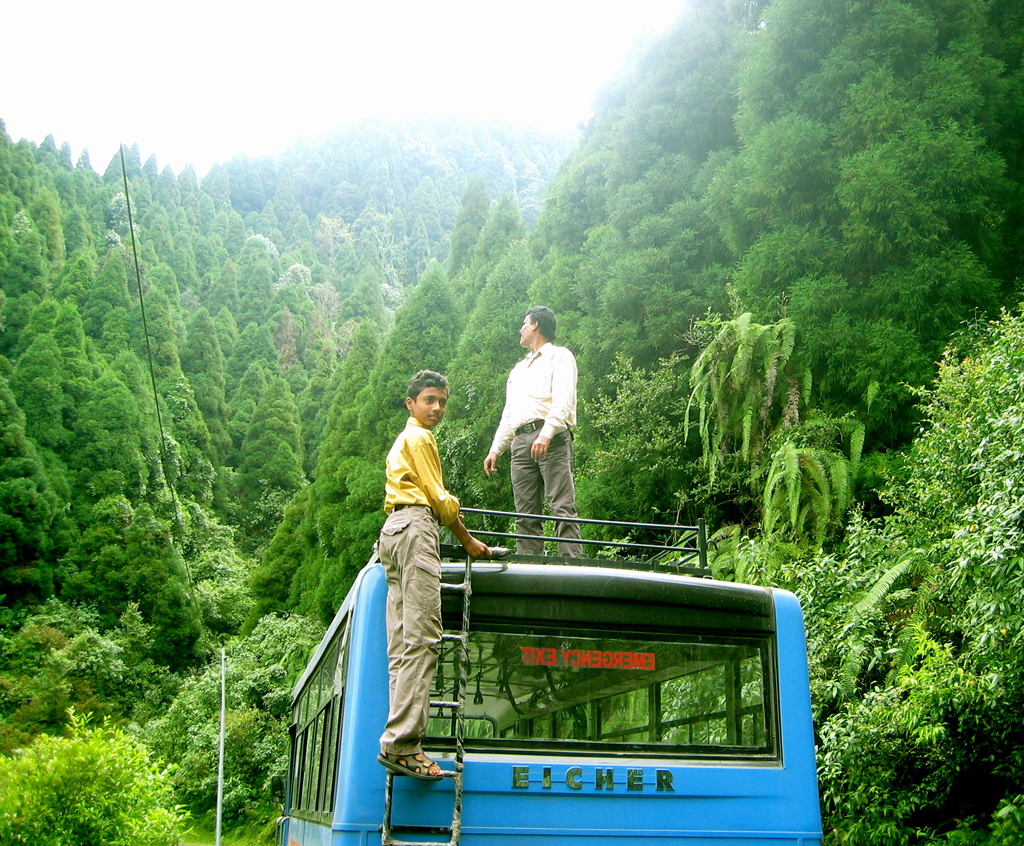
Curious Tourist on the Roof of NBSTC Bus at Lava

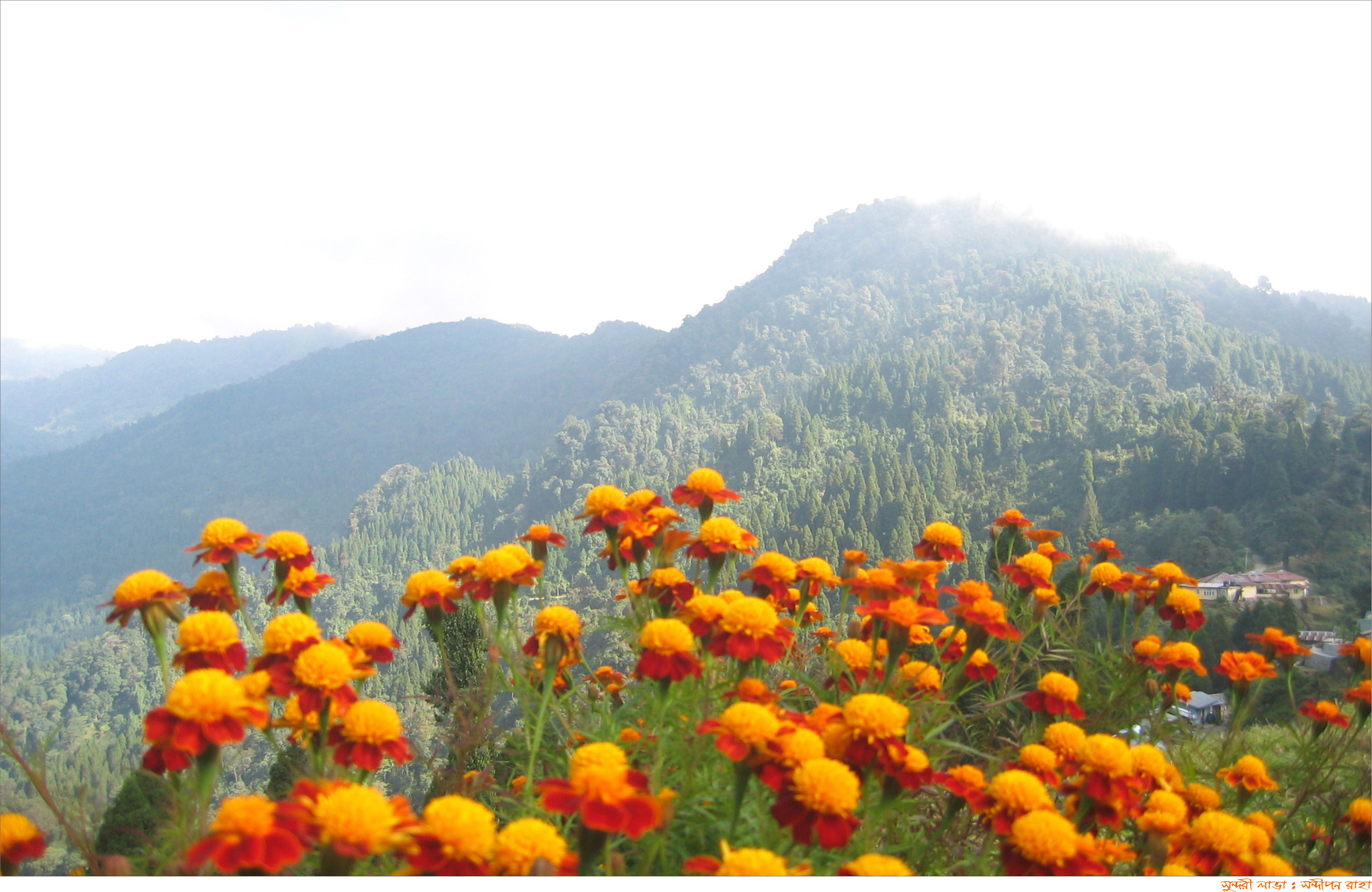
Rache-La from Kagyu Thek Chen Ling Monastery Year- 2009

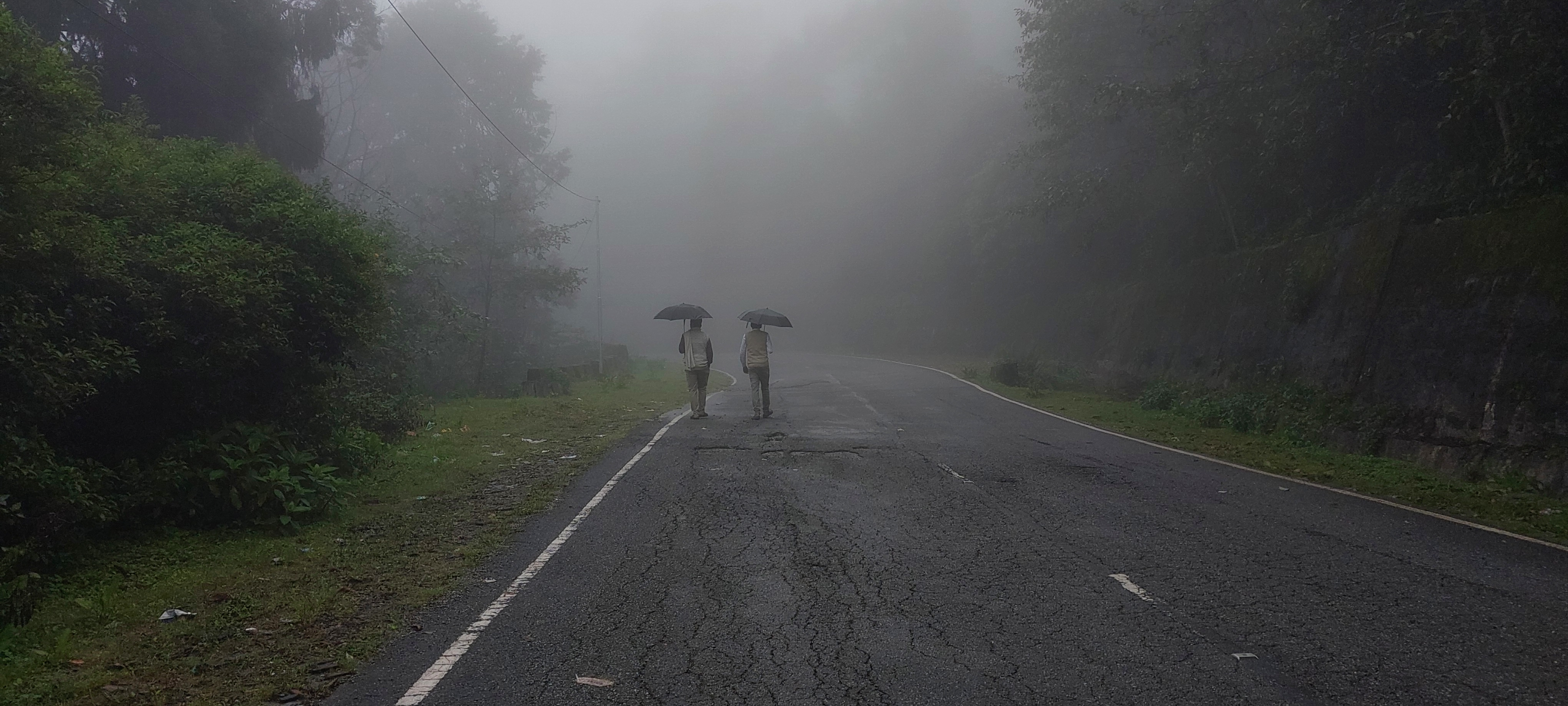
The smoky weather at Lava in May 2025
