= Kushtia Court railway station =

Railway station in Kushtia, Bangladesh

Kushtia Court কুষ্টিয়া কোর্ট
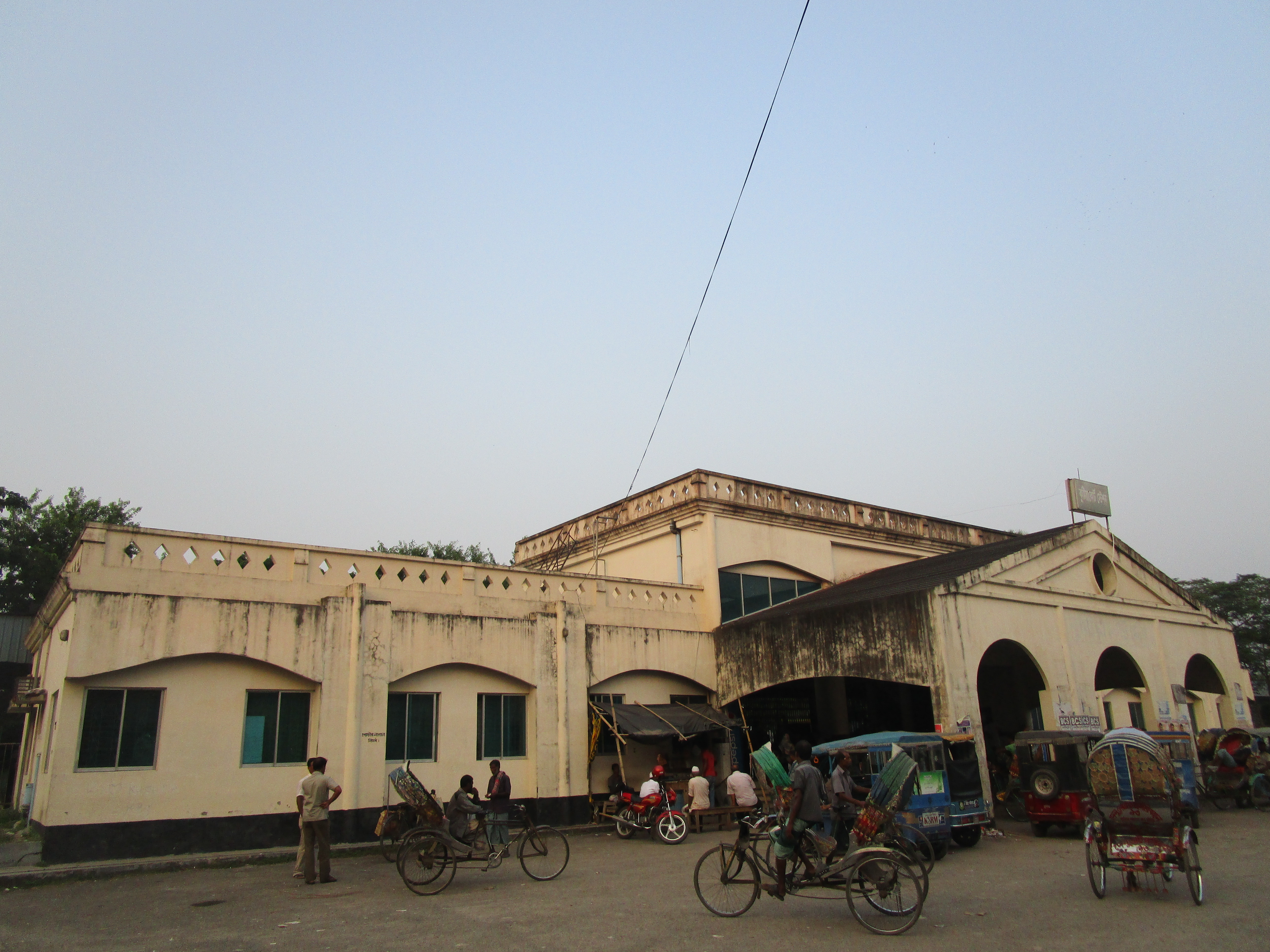

General information
- Location: Sir Iqbal Road, Courtpara, Kushtia; Bangladesh
- Coordinates: 23.907133°N 89.128218°E
- System: Railway station of Bangladesh
- Owner: Bangladesh Railway
- Platforms: 1
- Tracks: 1

Construction
- Parking: yes

Other information
- Station code: KSTC
- Fare zone: West Zone

Key dates
- Construction begin: 1869
- Opened: January 1, 1871; 155 years ago

Services
Preceding station	Bangladesh Railway	Following station
Jagati	Poradah–Goalundo Ghat line	Kushtia
Route map
Location

Kushtia Court railway station (কুষ্টিয়া কোর্ট রেলওয়ে স্টেশন) is a train station located in Kushtia city. Now It is the main station of Kushtia city. The station was first built in 1871.

== History ==
15 November 1862 the railway line from Ranaghat to Jagati in Kushtia was opened. This railway line was extended to Goalundo Ghat. The Poradah–Goalundo Ghat line was opened on 1st January 1871. Construction of Kushtia Court railway station began in 1869 and was opened in 1871.

== Services ==
The trains that stop at Kushtia Court Railway Station are mentioned below:

- Madhumati Express
- Sundarban Express
- Tungipara Express
- Benapole Express
- Nakshikantha Commuter
- Poradah Shuttle

== Gallery ==
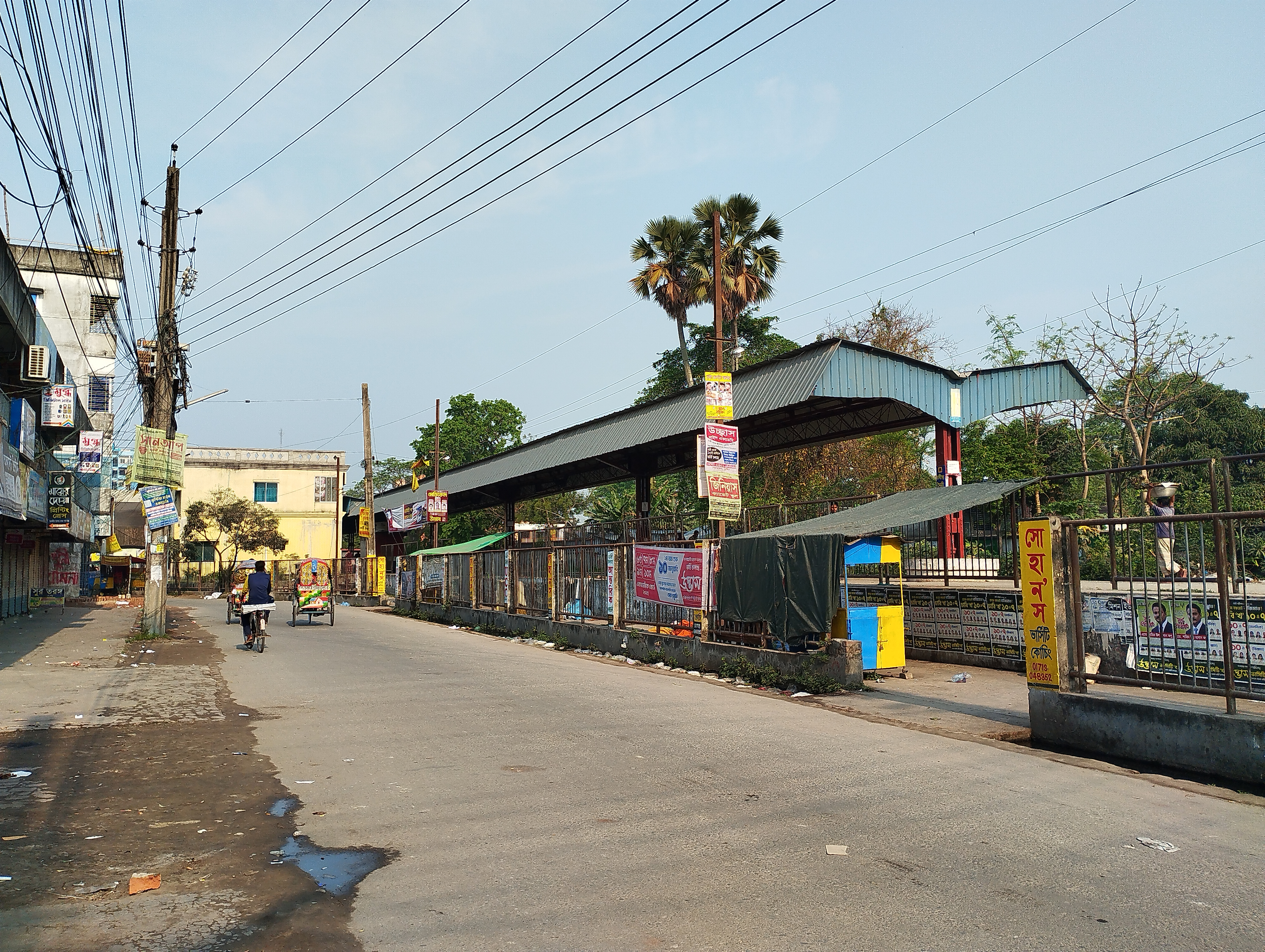
Court Station Road (Sir Iqbal Road)

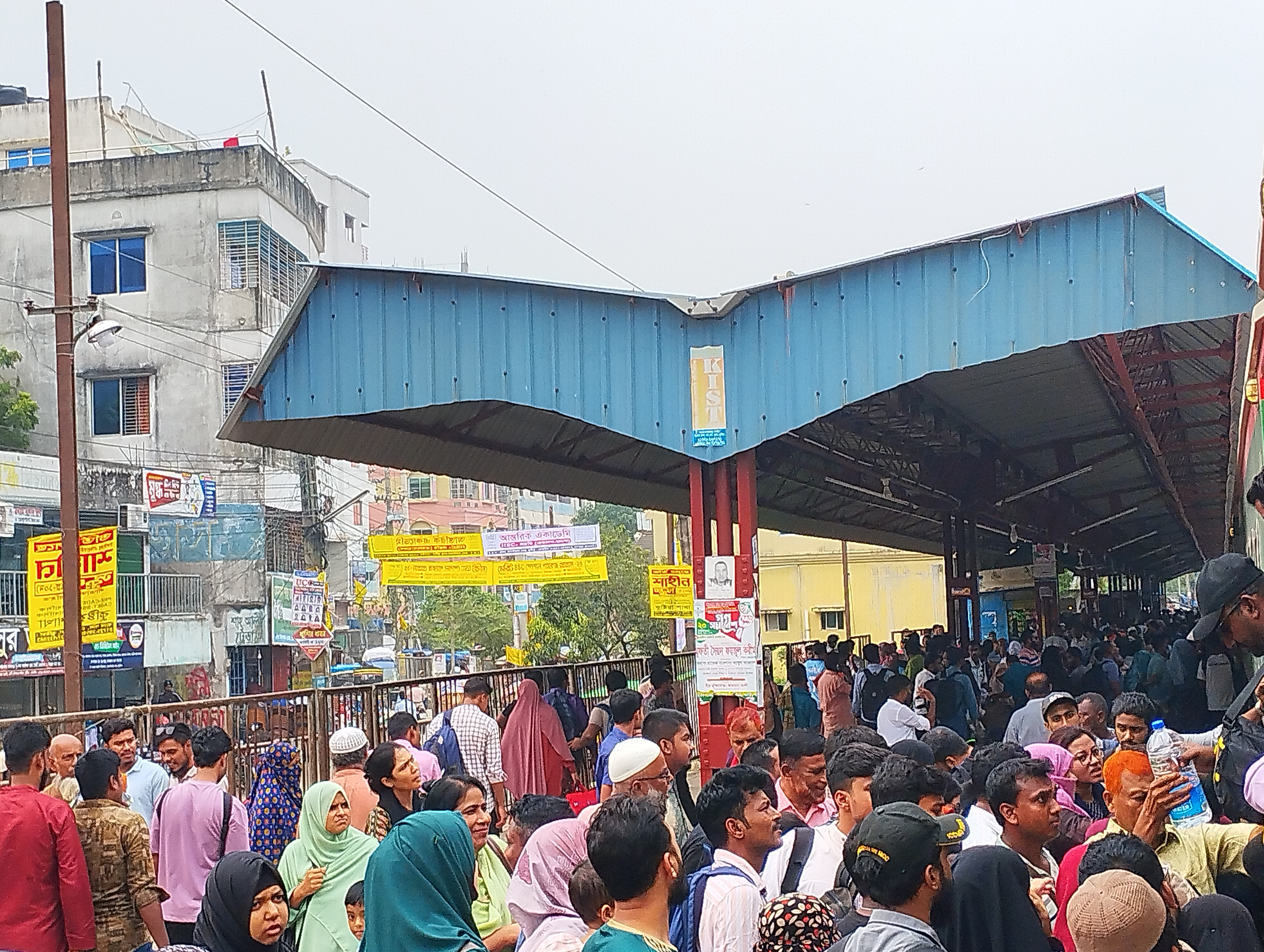
Passenger movement

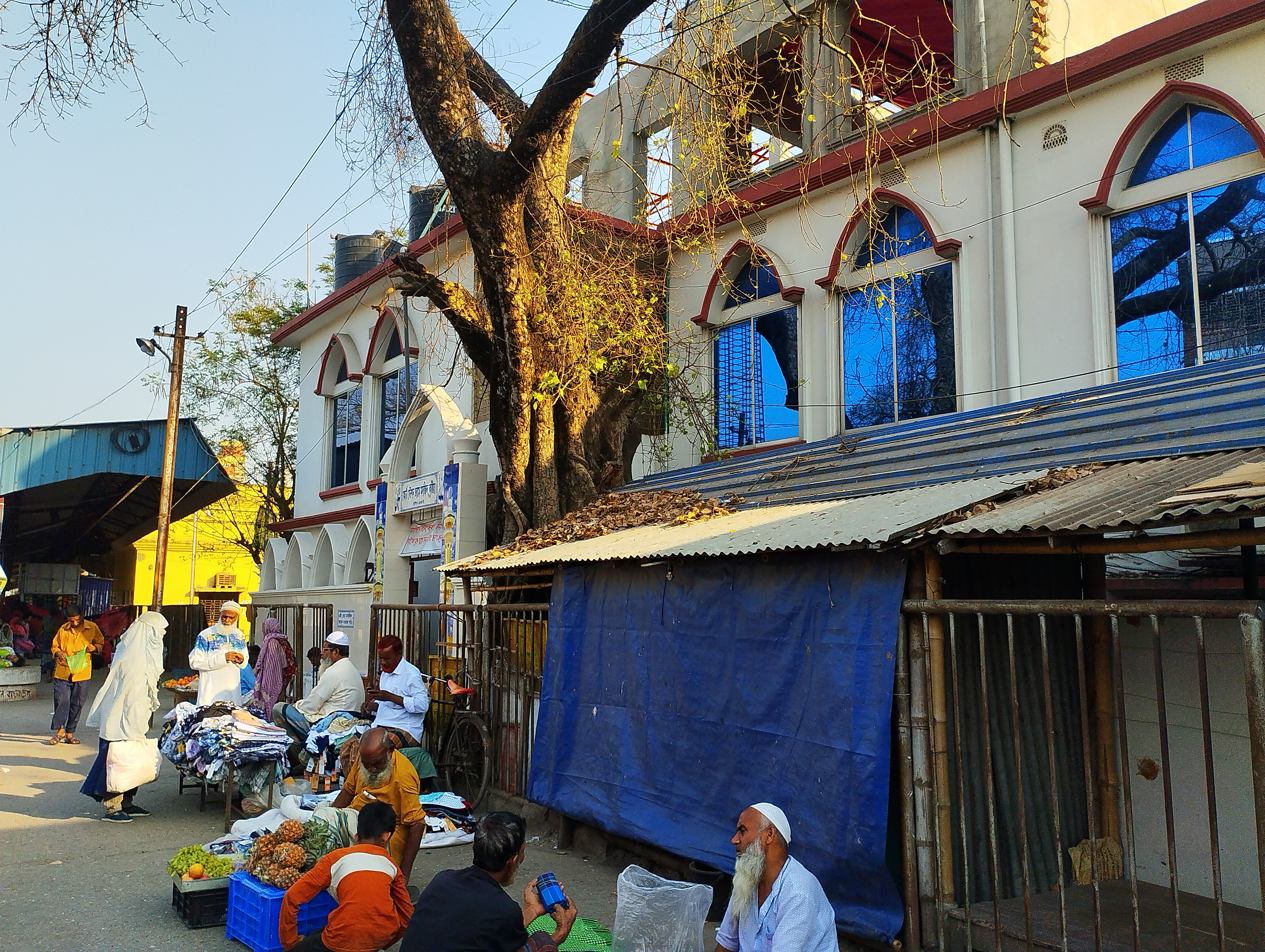
Kushtia Court Station Jame Masjid

== External ==
- Media related to Kushtia Court railway station at Wikimedia Commons
- Ali, Anoar. সার্ধশতবর্শ স্মারকগ্রন্থ ১৮৬৯-২০১৯ [150th Anniversary Memorial Book 1869-2019] (PDF) (in Bengali). Kushtia: Kushtia Municipal Corporation. ISBN 978-984-34608-1-3. Archived from the original (PDF) on 2024-09-12.
