= Benapole Express =

Passenger train service in Bangladesh

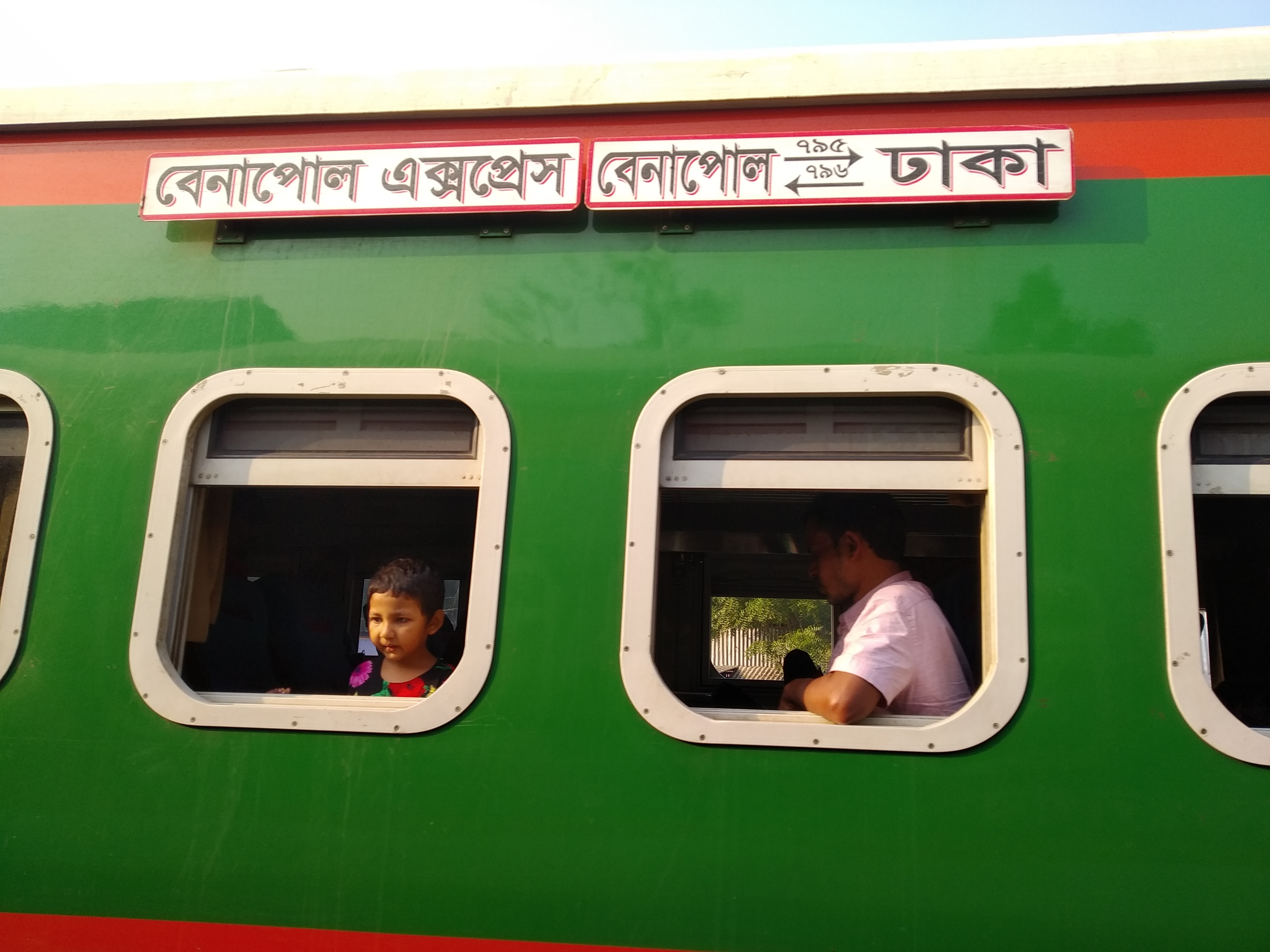

Overview
- Status: Operating
- Locale: Bangladesh
- First service: July 17, 2019
- Website: http://www.railway.gov.bd/

Route
- Stops: 10
- Average journey time: 8 hours
- Service frequency: 6 days each week

On-board services
- Catering facilities: On-board

Technical
- Rolling stock: One 6500/ 6600 Class locomotive; Three chair carriages; Four Economy carriages; One AC Cabin carriages; One Non-Ac Cabin Carriages; One generator car; One buffet car; Two Guard brake
- Track gauge: Broad gauge (1676 mm)

Benapole Express (Train no. 795-796) is an intercity train which runs between Dhaka (capital of Bangladesh) and Benapole. The train connects the capital to an important Land port of Bangladesh.

== History ==
There was no train service directly from Benapole to Dhaka. So Bangladesh government had decided to operate a new intercity train on Dhaka-Benapole route as the existing train makes 14 stops, taking the total travel time to 10 to 12 hours. In order to reach Dhaka, the passengers of India are facing extreme suffering. The only road to travel depends on the bus. This breakthrough move saves at least 3 to 4 hours as Benapole Express is reaching its destination within 7–8 hours daily. The Benapole Express has been scheduled to run non-stop for six days every week.

== Naming ==
The train is named after its final destination. At first, a few names including Bandar Express, Ichhamati Express and Benapole Express were proposed but Prime Minister Sheikh Hasina decided on the name Benapole Express.

== Coaches ==
The Benapole Express has a total of 896 seats. There are 12 new coaches on the train with advanced technologies and facilities which have been procured from China. Among them, two are air-conditioned controlled. There is a wheelchair system for disabled passengers, which is the first in Bangladesh.

Rolling Stock:

- AC Chair 2
- AC Cabin 1
- Shovon Chair 6
- Power Car 1
- Guard Brake 2

At the beginning, the train used to run with 12 new coaches procured from Indonesia. But then the new coaches were replaced with 10 LHB coaches from India. On 18 April 2023, Benapole express received its current Chinese coaches with advanced technologies and facilities under the Padma Rail Link.

== Halts ==
The train will have stopovers in-

- Benapole
- Jhikargacha
- Jashore Jn
- Mobarakganj
- Kotchandpur
- Darsana Halt
- Chuadanga
- Alamdanga
- Poradah Jn
- Kushtia Court railway Station
- Khoksha Railway Station
- Kalukhali Jn
- Rajbari
- Faridpur railway station
- Bhanga
- Dhaka

== Price ==
The ticket price for the train has been fixed at ৳485 taka for Shovan chair, ৳1,047 taka for Snigdha, ৳1,213 taka for air-conditioned seats each and ৳1,869 taka for air-conditioned cabins.

== Foods ==
Two canteen are added to the train. Here burgers, cakes, sandwiches, patches, rolls, bread, tea, copies, cutlets, boiled eggs, fried chicken, kebab singers, samucha, various types of soft drinks and mineral water are available.
