= Rajbari railway station =

Railway station in Rajbari District, Bangladesh

Rajbari রাজবাড়ী
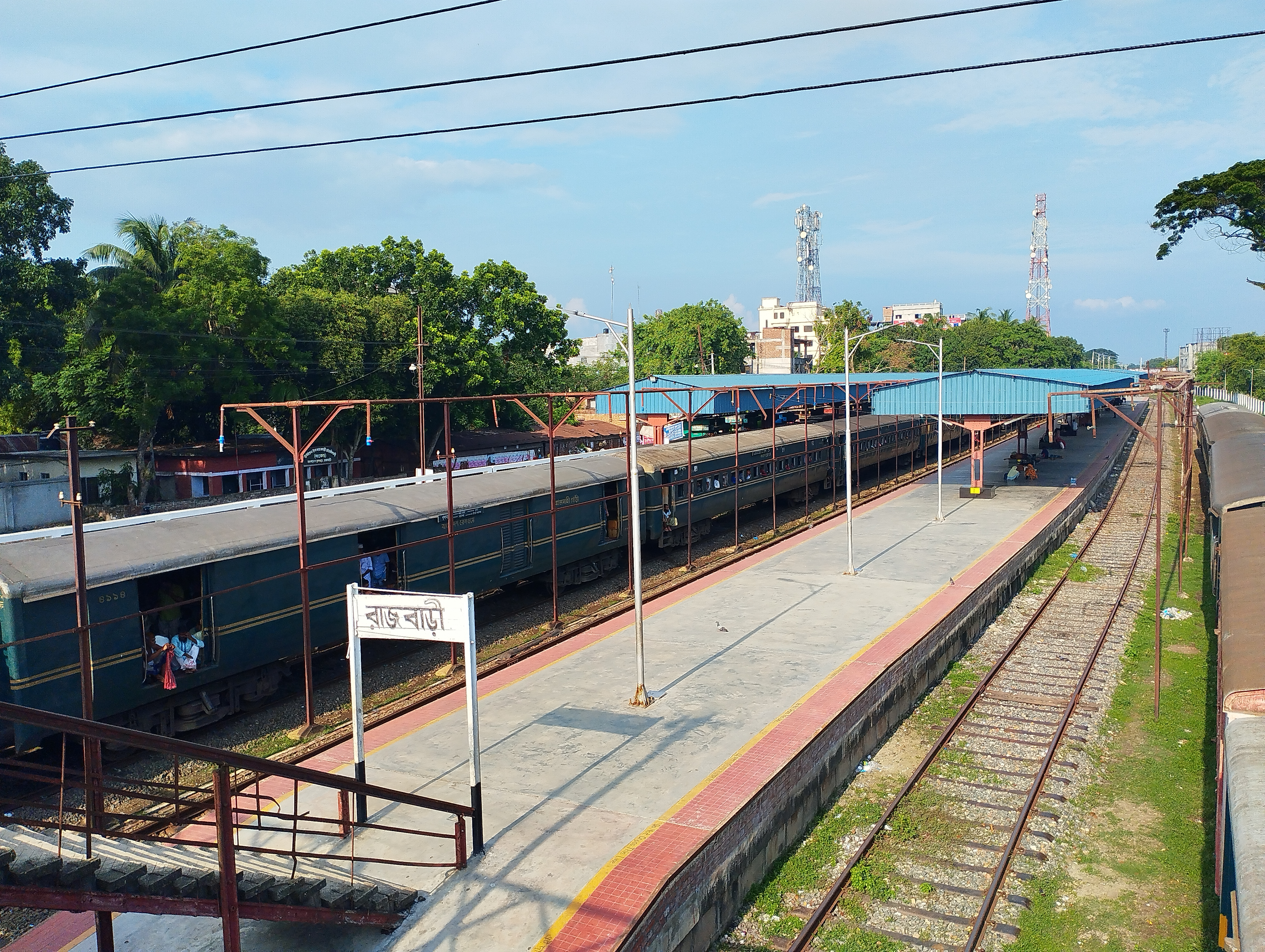
- Rajbari railway station platform

General information
- Location: Rajbari, Rajbari District, Dhaka Division; Bangladesh
- Coordinates: 23.7628941°N 89.6452302°E
- Owner: Bangladesh Railway
- Line: Poradah–Goalundo Ghat line
- Platforms: 3
- Tracks: 5

Construction
- Structure type: Standard (on ground station)
- Parking: Yes
- Cycle facilities: Yes
- Accessible: Yes

Other information
- Status: Opened
- Station code: RB
- Zone(s): West Zone
- Division(s): Pakshi

History
- Opened: January 1, 1871; 155 years ago

Services
Preceding station	Bangladesh Railway	Following station
Surjanagar towards Poradah Junction	Poradah–Goalundo Ghat	Panchuria Junction towards Goalundo Ghat
Location

Rajbari railway station is a railway in Rajbari in Dhaka Division, Bangladesh. It is located in Poradah–Goalundo Ghat line. The station was established on 1 January 1871.
