= Poradah–Goalundo Ghat line =

Railway line in Bangladesh

Overview
- Status: Functioning
- Owner: Bangladesh Railway
- Locale: Bangladesh
- Termini: Poradah Junction railway station; Goalundo Ghat railway station
- Stations: 16

Service
- Type: Railway line in Bangladesh

History
- Opened: Darshana–Poradah–Jagati (opened 15 November 1862); Jagati–Goalundo Ghat (1 January 1871)

Technical
- Track gauge: Broad-gauge 1,676 mm (5 ft 6 in)
- Operating speed: 80

Poradah–Goalundo Ghat line is a broad-gauge railway of Bangladesh Railway. The line is maintained and operated by West Zone.

== History ==
On 29 September 1862, the Eastern Bengal Railway inaugurated the railway line from Calcutta to Ranaghat. This line was extended and on 15 November 1862 and a 53.11 km broad gauge (1,676 mm) railway section was opened from Darshana to Jagati. Kushtia was a marginal station at that time, but in 1867, due to the erosion of the Padma, it was shifted to the banks of the Gorai river and the original Kushtia station was abandoned in the following year. A 75 km railway line from Kushtia to the inland river port of Goalundo on the banks of the Padma (below the confluence of the Padma and Jamuna River) was inaugurated on 1 January 1871.

== Stations ==
- Poradah Junction railway station
- Jagati railway station
- Kushtia Court railway station
- Kushtia railway station
- Choraikal railway station
- Kumarkhali railway station
- Khoksha railway station
- Machpara railway station
- Pangsha railway station
- Kalukhali Junction railway station
- Belgachi railway station
- Surjanagar railway station
- Rajbari railway station
- Pachuria Junction railway station
- Goalundo Bazar railway station
- Goalundo Ghat railway station
