= Kushtia railway station =

Railway station in Kushtia District, Bangladesh

Kushtia কুষ্টিয়া

General information
- Location: Kushtia, Khulna Division; Bangladesh
- Coordinates: 23.9025503°N 89.1454874°E
- System: Railway station
- Owner: Bangladesh Railway
- Operator: Bangladesh Railway
- Line: Poradah–Goalundo Ghat line
- Platforms: 1
- Train operators: Western Railway

Construction
- Structure type: At-grade
- Parking: Yes
- Cycle facilities: Yes

History
- Opened: 1871; 155 years ago

Services
Preceding station	Bangladesh Railway	Following station
Kushtia Court	Line; Poradah–Kalukhali–Goalundo Ghat	Choraikal
Location

Kushtia railway station is a railway station in Kushtia City of Kushtia District of Khulna Division, Bangladesh.

== Location ==
The railway station is located in Mill Para of Kusthia City.

== History ==
The origins of Kushtia’s railway links go back to the early colonial period. On 29 September 1862, the Eastern Bengal Railway inaugurated the railway from Kolkata to Ranaghat. This line was extended and on 15 November 1862, a 53.11 km broad gauge (1,676 mm) railway branch was opened from Darshana to Jagati.

Following a major breach in the Padma River in 1867 that disrupted traffic to the original terminal, a new alignment was constructed. The 75 km long railway line from Kushtia to Goaland Ghat, an inland river port on the banks of the Padma was inaugurated on 1 January 1871.

Despite its historic importance, Kushtia Railway Station has seen little renovation since its establishment. A 2025 report in the Dhaka Tribune described the station as "a century of decay," noting that while it once symbolized colonial-era modernity, today its platforms, waiting rooms, and yard infrastructure are in a state of long-term neglect.
