= Jagati railway station =

Railway station in Kushtia District, Bangladesh

Jagati জগতি
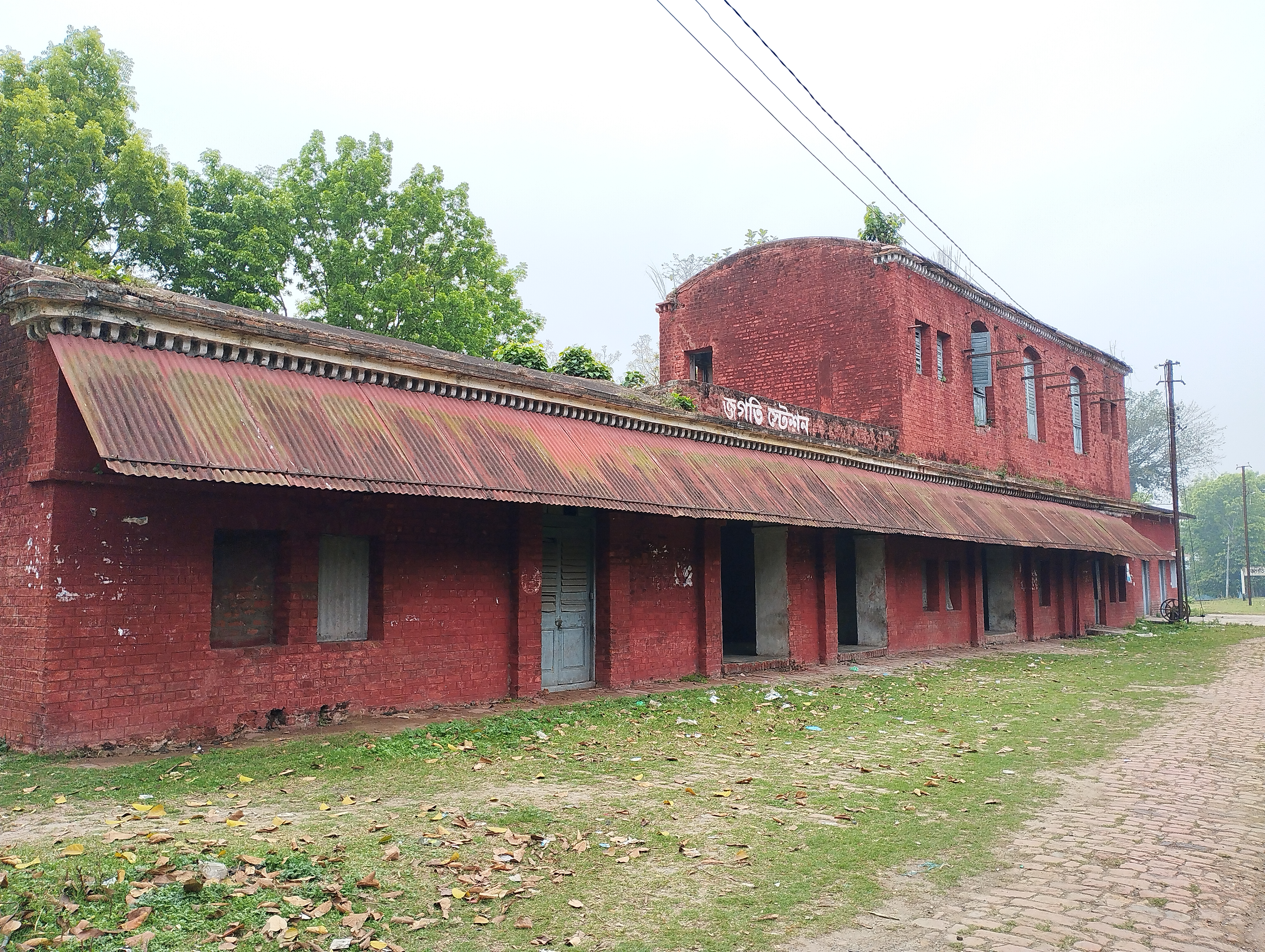
- Jagati railway station building

General information
- Location: Kushtia, Khulna Division; Bangladesh
- Coordinates: 23.890639°N 89.098678°E
- System: Railway Station
- Owner: Bangladesh Railway
- Operator: Bangladesh Railway
- Line: Poradah–Kalukhali–Goalundo Ghat line
- Platforms: 1

Construction
- Parking: Yes
- Cycle facilities: Yes
- Accessible: Yes

History
- Opened: 15 November 1862

Services
Preceding station	Bangladesh Railway	Following station
Poradah Junction	Line; Poradah–Kalukhali–Goalundo Ghat	Kushtia Court
Location

Jagati railway station (Bengali: জগতি রেলওয়ে স্টেশন) is a railway station in Kushtia, Bangladesh. It was one of the first railway stations in present-day Bangladesh.

== History ==
Kushtia's Jagati Railway Station has been a witness to the history of the railways in Bangladesh. This is the country's first railway station. During the British period, this station was opened in 1862 to travel from Sealdah to Kushtia. In 1844, R. M Stephenson formed the East India Railway Company to build a railway line from Howrah near Kolkata to the coal-mining-rich Raniganj town of West Bengal. In 1854, the company opened a 38-km long rail line from Howrah to Hooghly. Then on September 29, 1862, the Eastern Bengal Railway opened the rail line from Kolkata to Ranaghat. Extending this line, a 53.11-km Broad gauge railway line section was unveiled on November 15 that year until Jagati in Kushtia. At that time, the first railway station of East Bengal, Jagati, was established. Later, in order to facilitate the communication between Dhaka and Kolkata, on January 1, 1871, a railway line was started from Jagati to Goalundo ghat on the banks of the Padma river in the present Rajbari District. At that time, people used to take a train from Kolkata and go to Goalundo ghat via Jagati station.

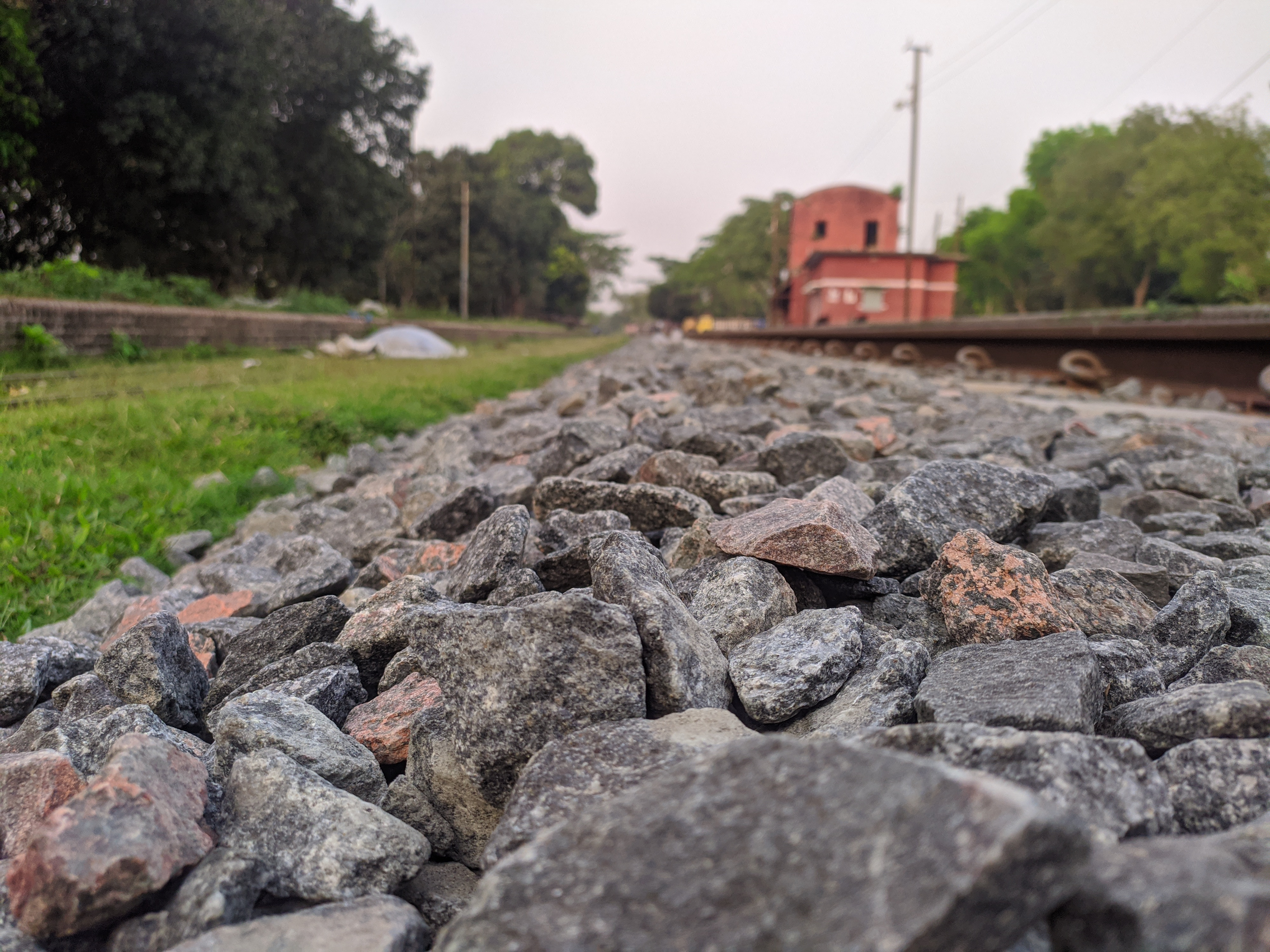
Side view of Jagati Railway Station

== Service ==
Trains that run through Jagati Railway Station are mentioned below:

- Modhumoti express
- Tungipara express
- Nakshikantha express
- Local trains
