= Poradah Junction railway station =

Railway Junction in Kushtia, Bangladesh

Poradah Junction পোড়াদহ জংশন
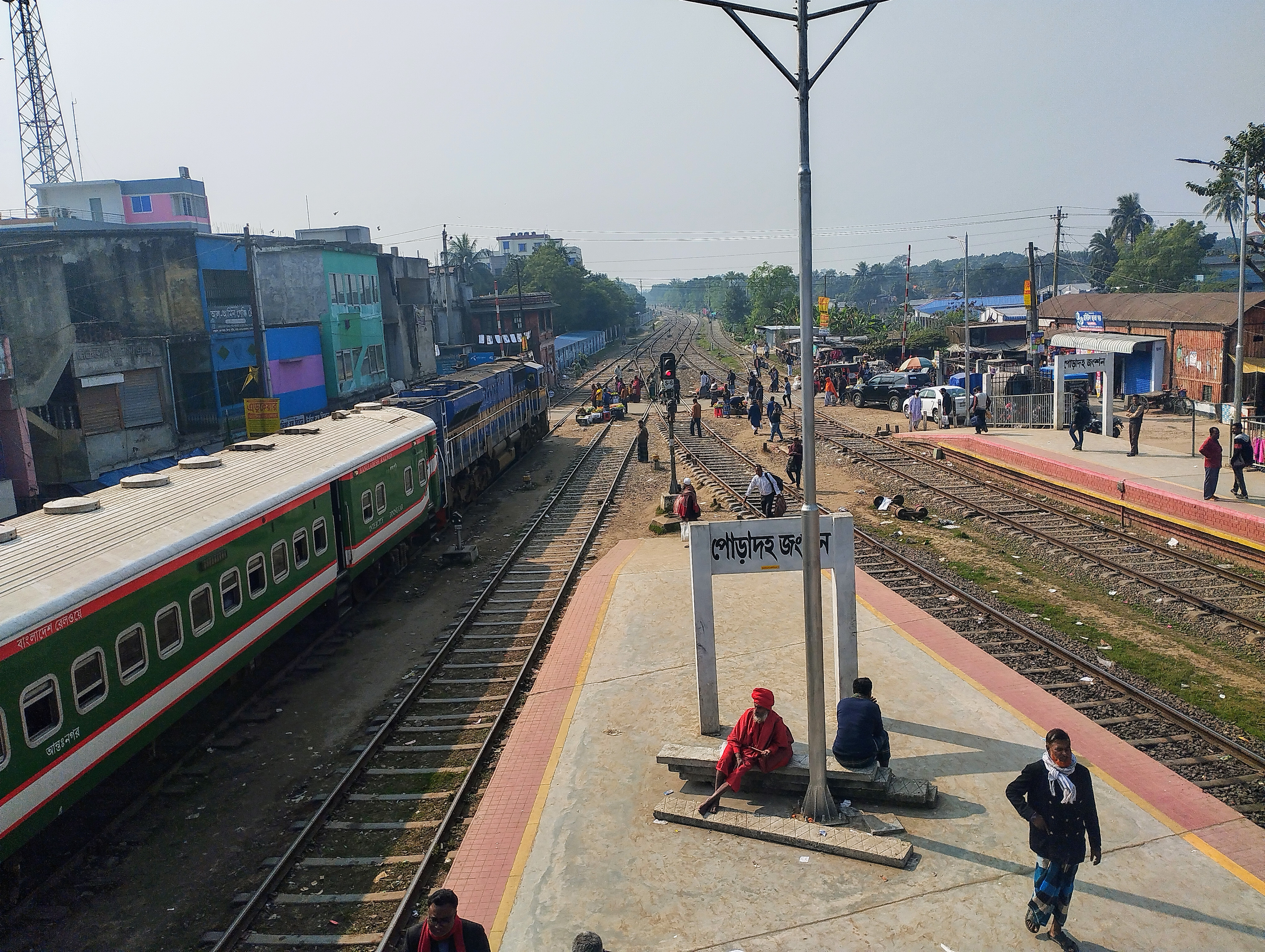
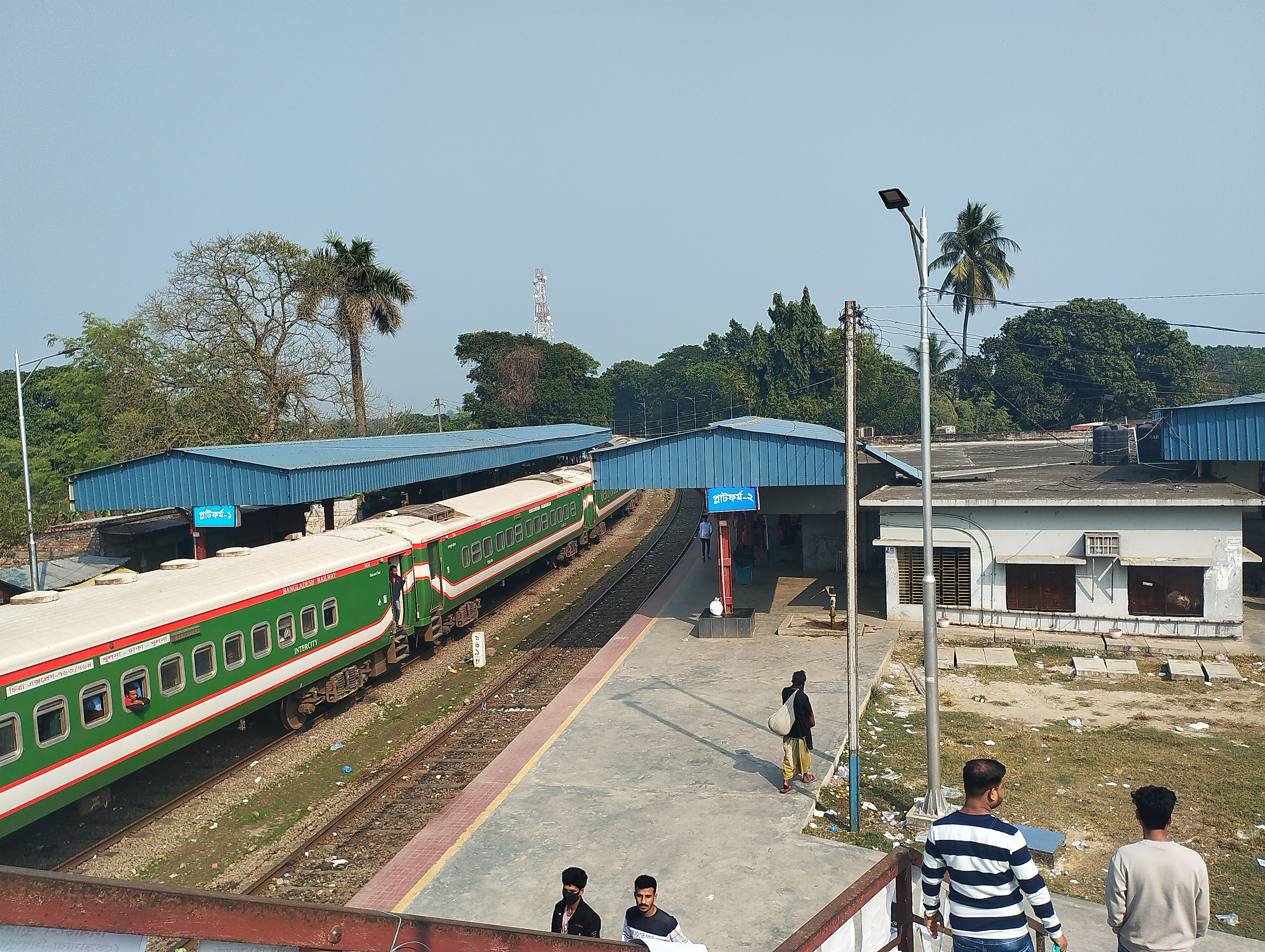
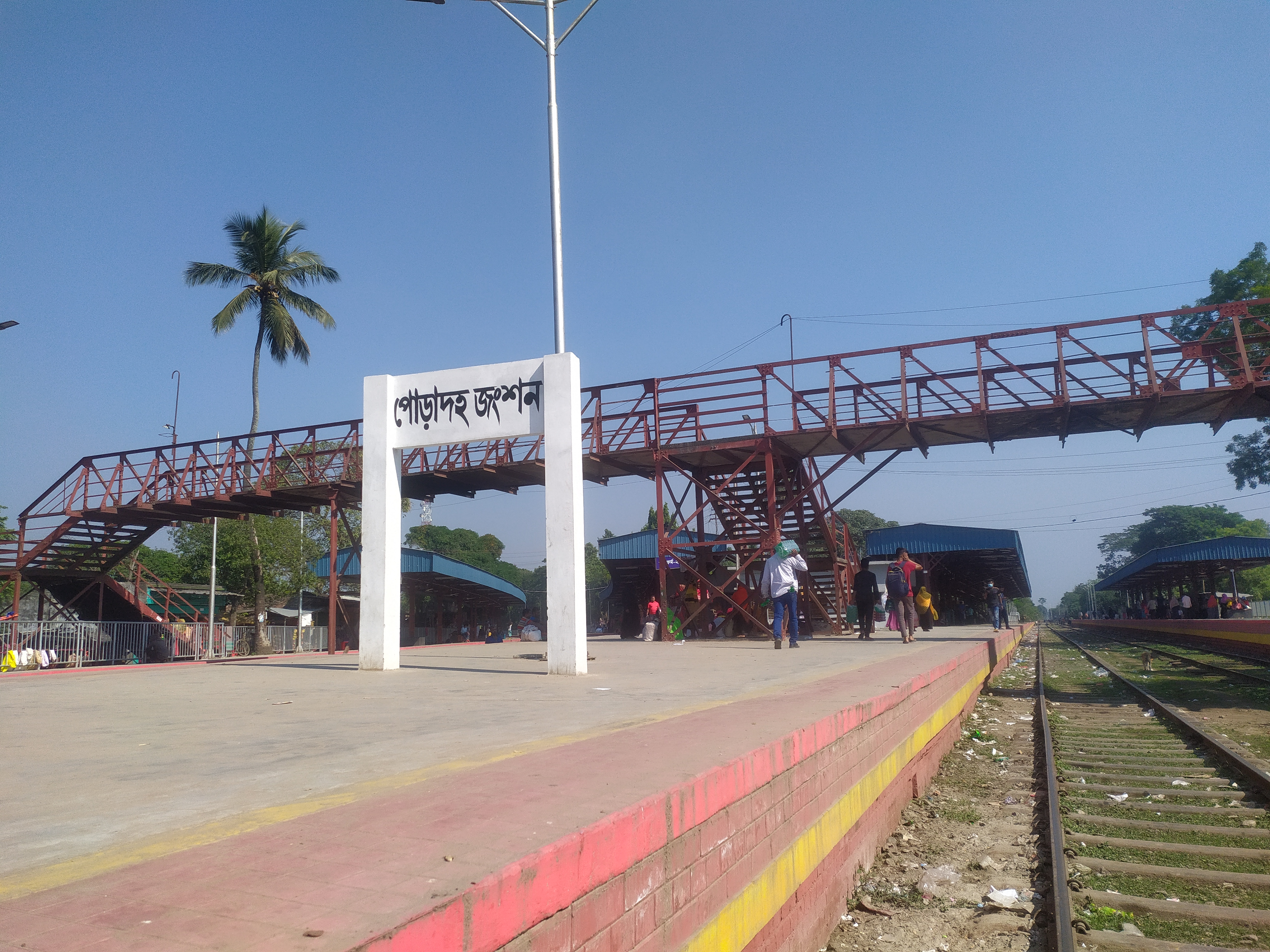
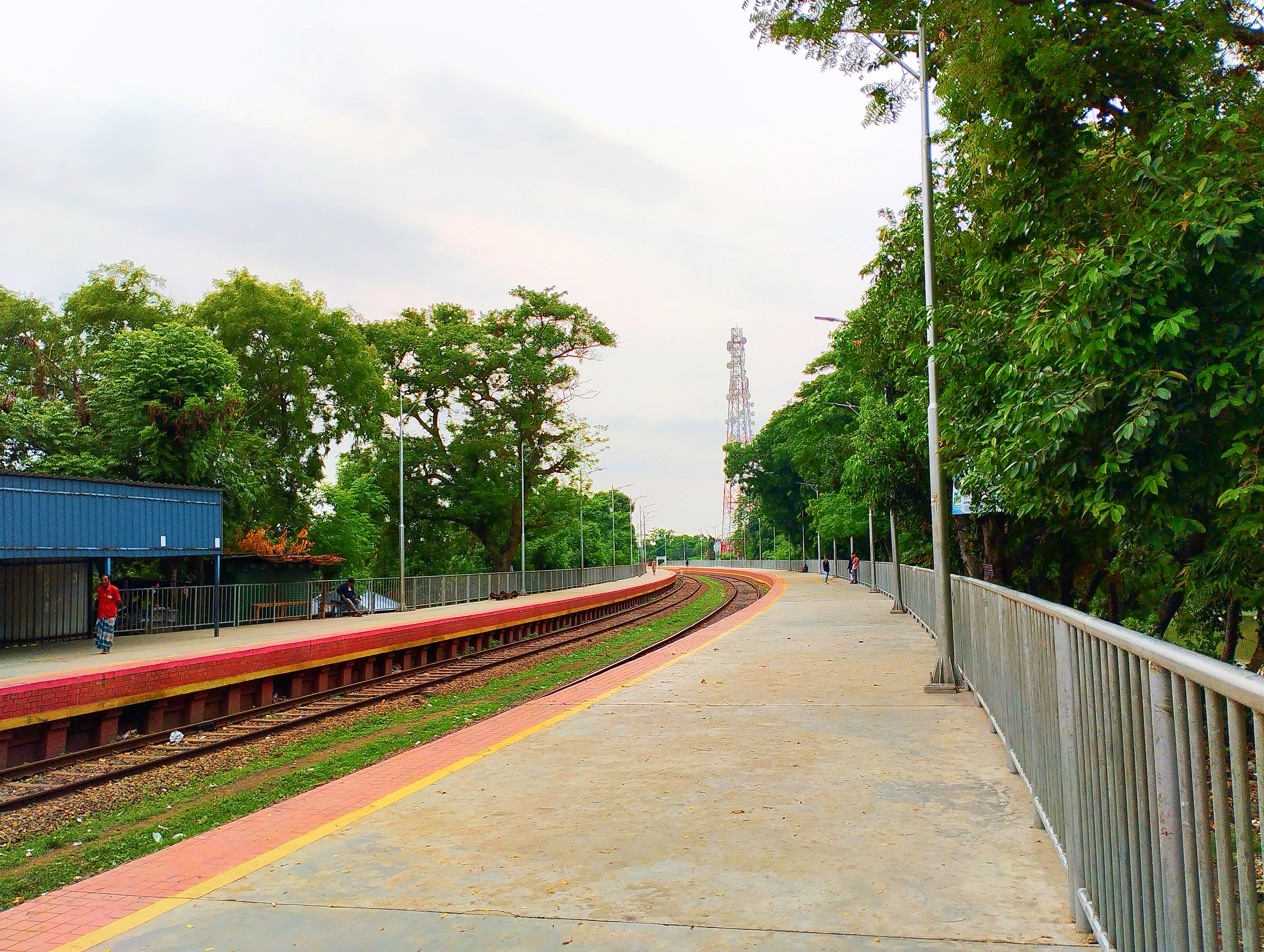
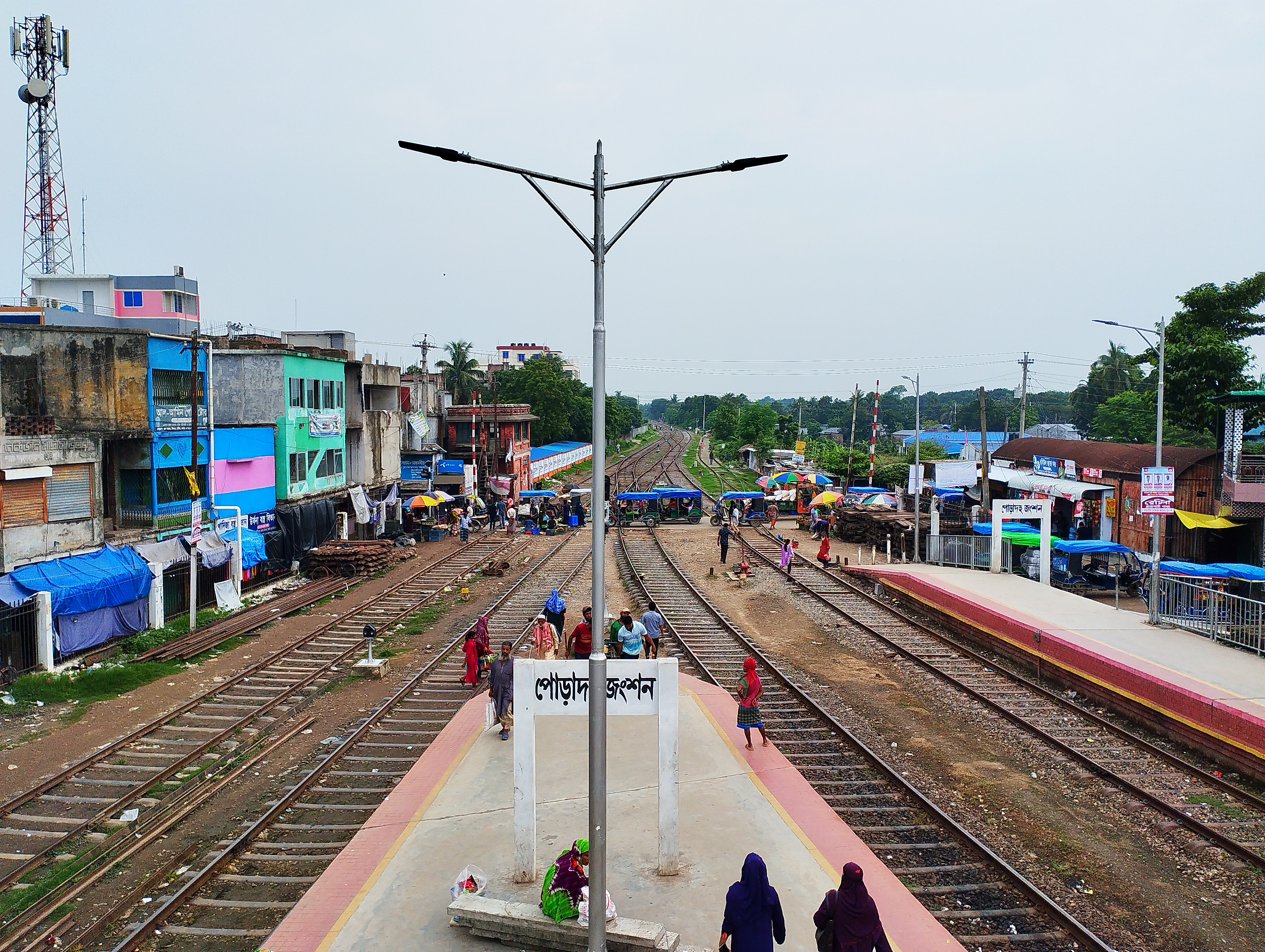
- Sundarban Express stands at platform no.4 Chitra Express stands at platform no.1 Platform No. 3 (Poradah–Goalundo Ghat line) Platform No. 1 and 2 (Chilahati–Parbatipur–Santahar–Darshana line)

General information
- Location: Kushtia District; Bangladesh
- Coordinates: 23.864725°N 89.0327096°E
- System: Bangladesh Railway Station
- Lines: Chilahati–Parbatipur–Santahar–Darshana line; Poradah–Goalundo Ghat line
- Platforms: 4
- Tracks: Broad Gauge

Construction
- Structure type: Standard (on ground station)

Other information
- Status: Functioning
- Station code: PDB
- Zone(s): West Zone
- Division(s): Paksey

History
- Opened: 1862; 164 years ago
- Original company: Eastern Bengal Railway

Key dates
- Becomes a junction: 1878; 148 years ago
- Operate by PER: 1961-1971; 10 years
- Operate by BR: 1972-present

Services
Preceding station	Bangladesh Railway	Following station
Mirpur	Line; Chilahati–Parbatipur–Santahar–Darshana	Halsa
Terminus	Line; Poradah–Goalundo Ghat	Jagati
Location

Poradah Junction railway station is a railway junction located in Poradah of Kushtia District, Bangladesh. It is the first railway junction of Bangladesh.

== History ==
The British Raj government laid the first railway line from Calcutta to Jagati via Poradah on 15 November 1862. Later, the Poradah–Bheramara railway line opened by 1878, making Poradah railway station a junction. The Benapole Express train running from Dhaka to Benapole takes a break at Poradah Junction.

== Gallery ==
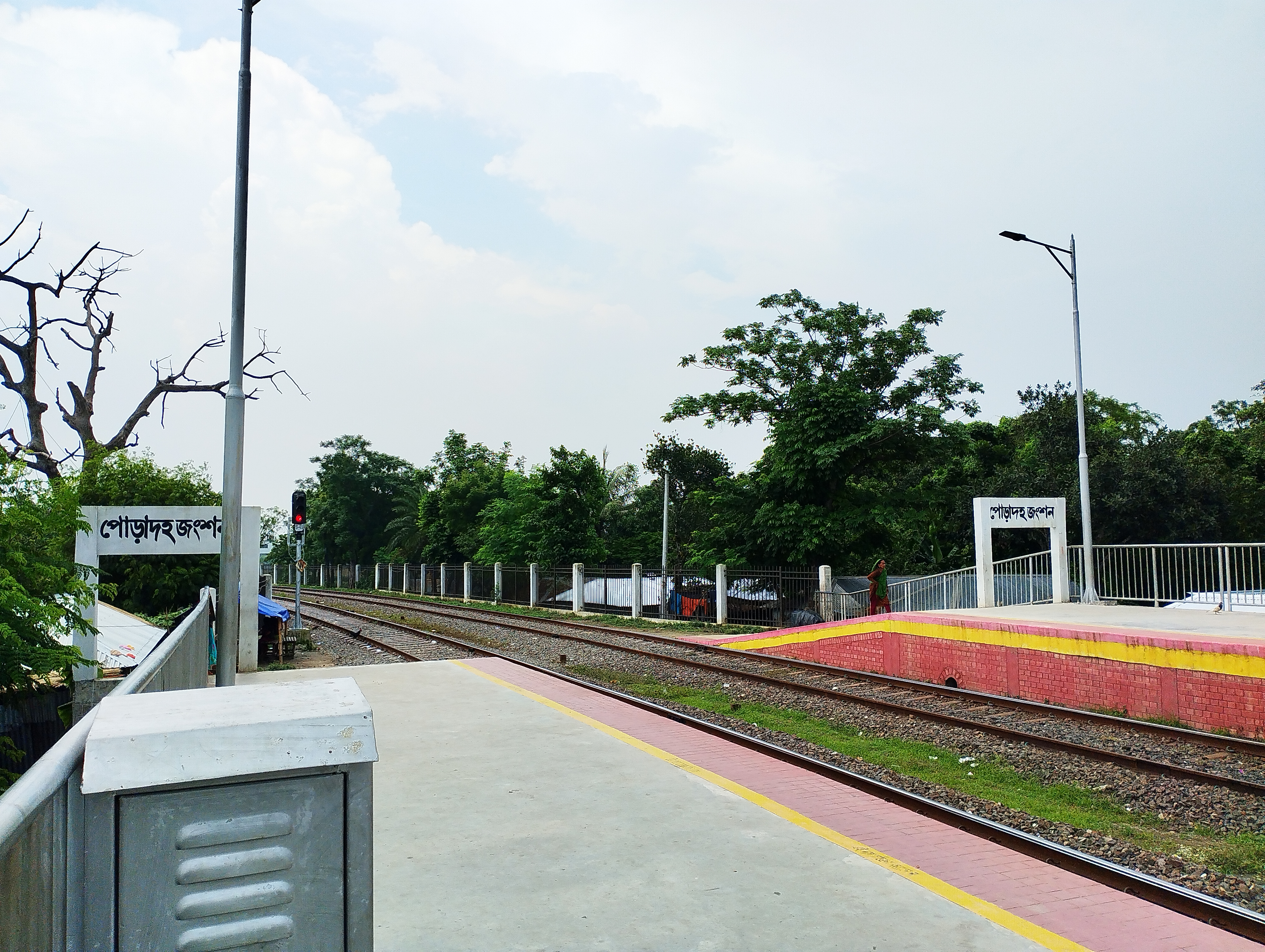
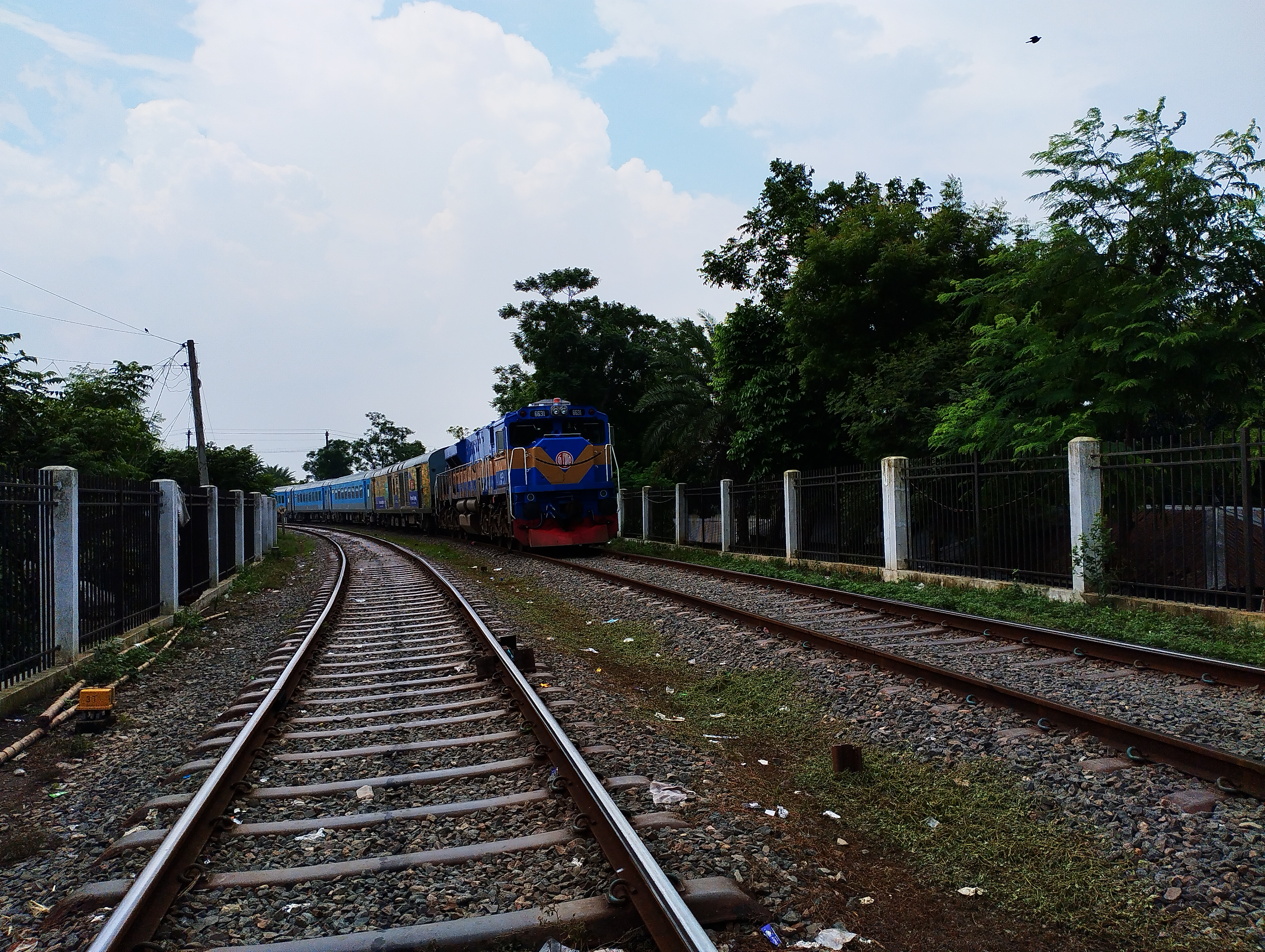
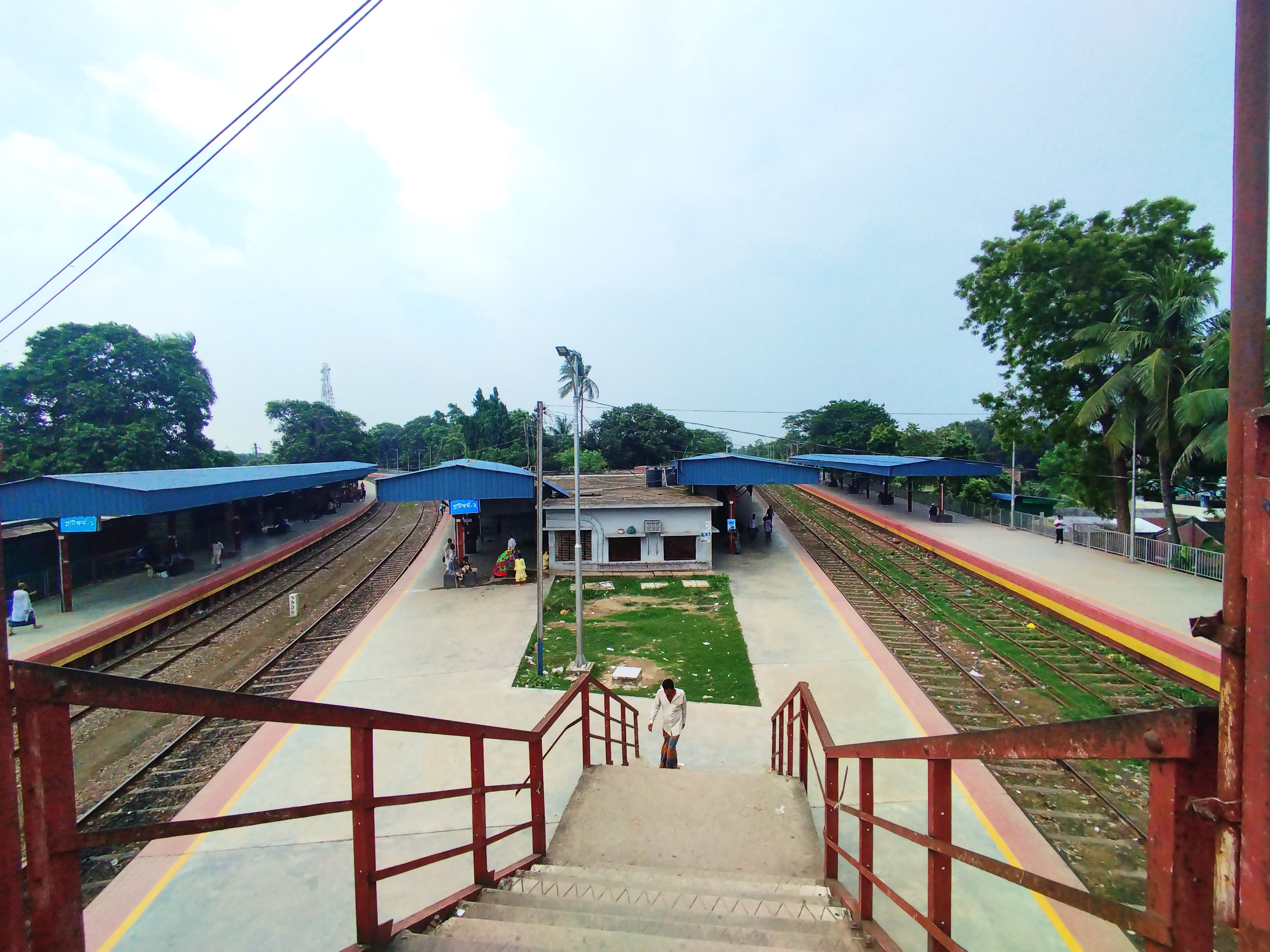
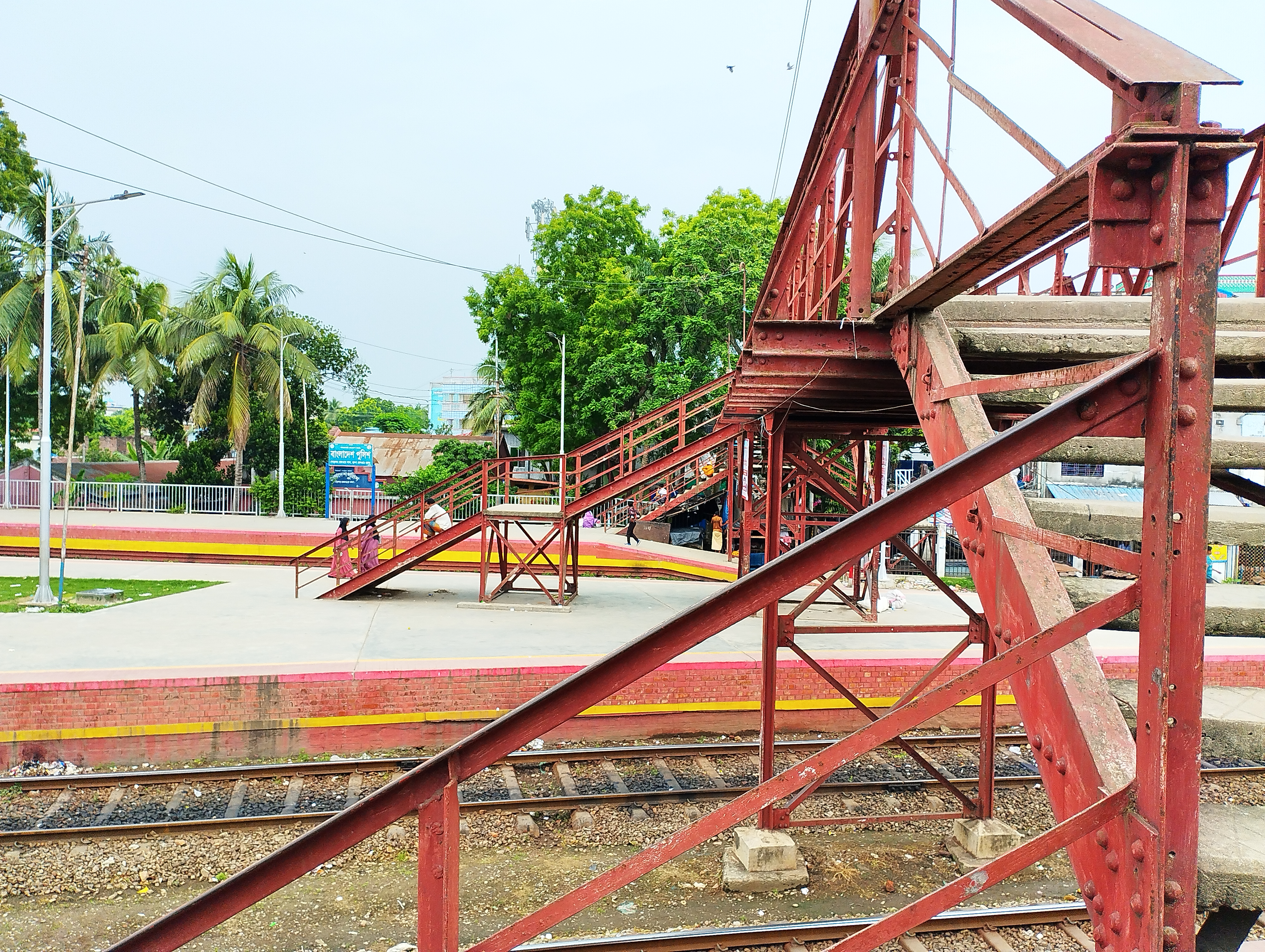
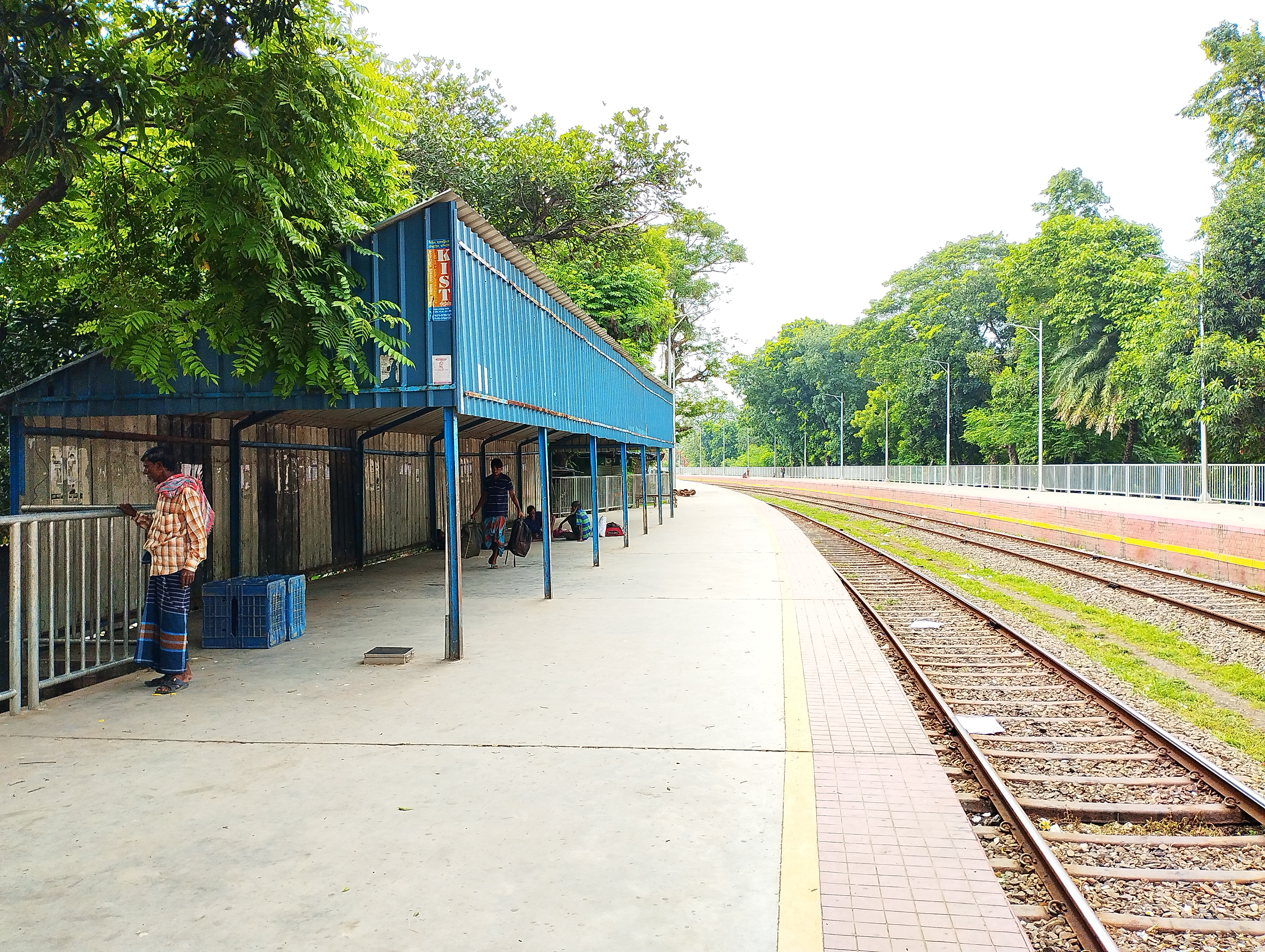
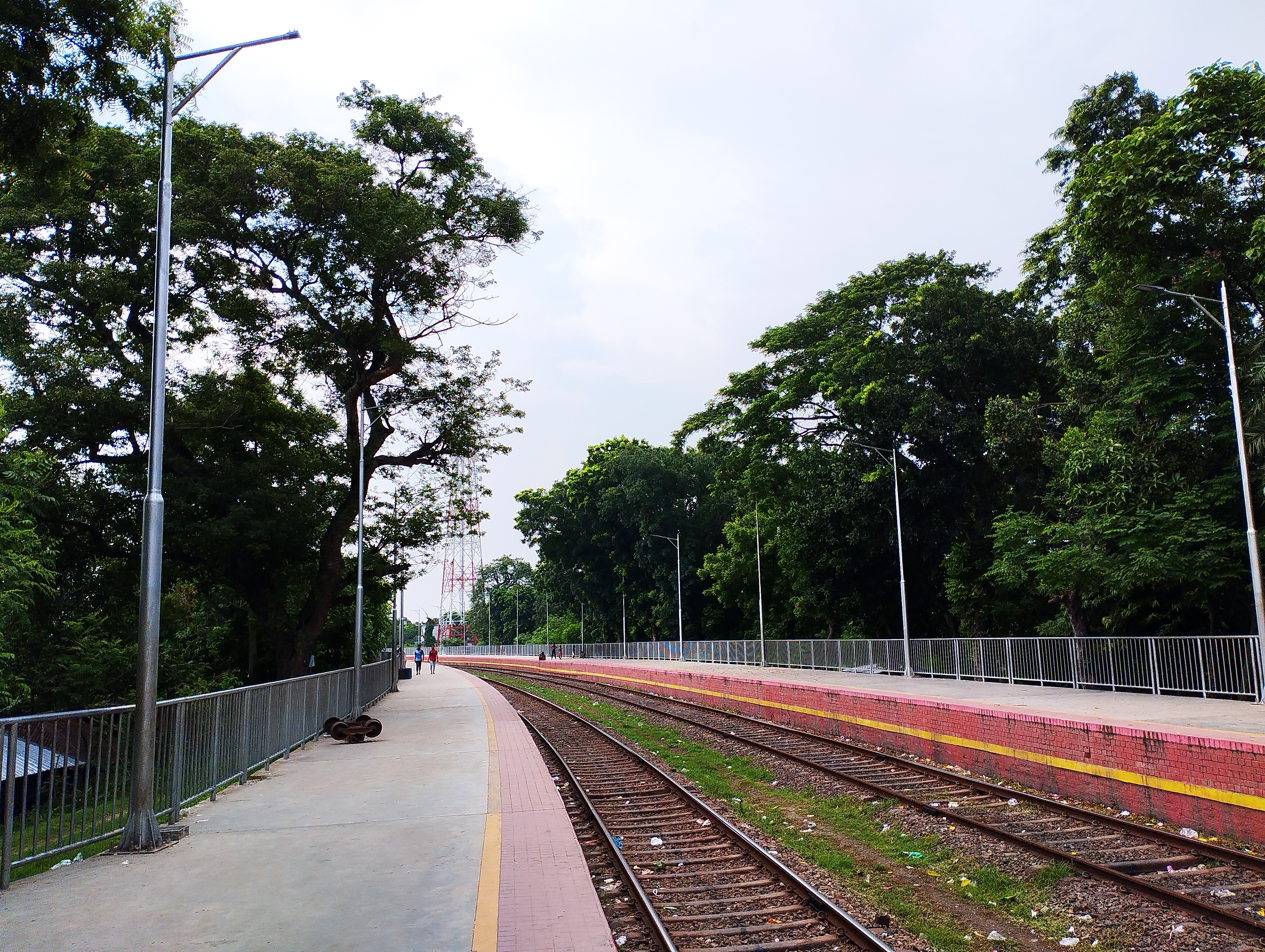
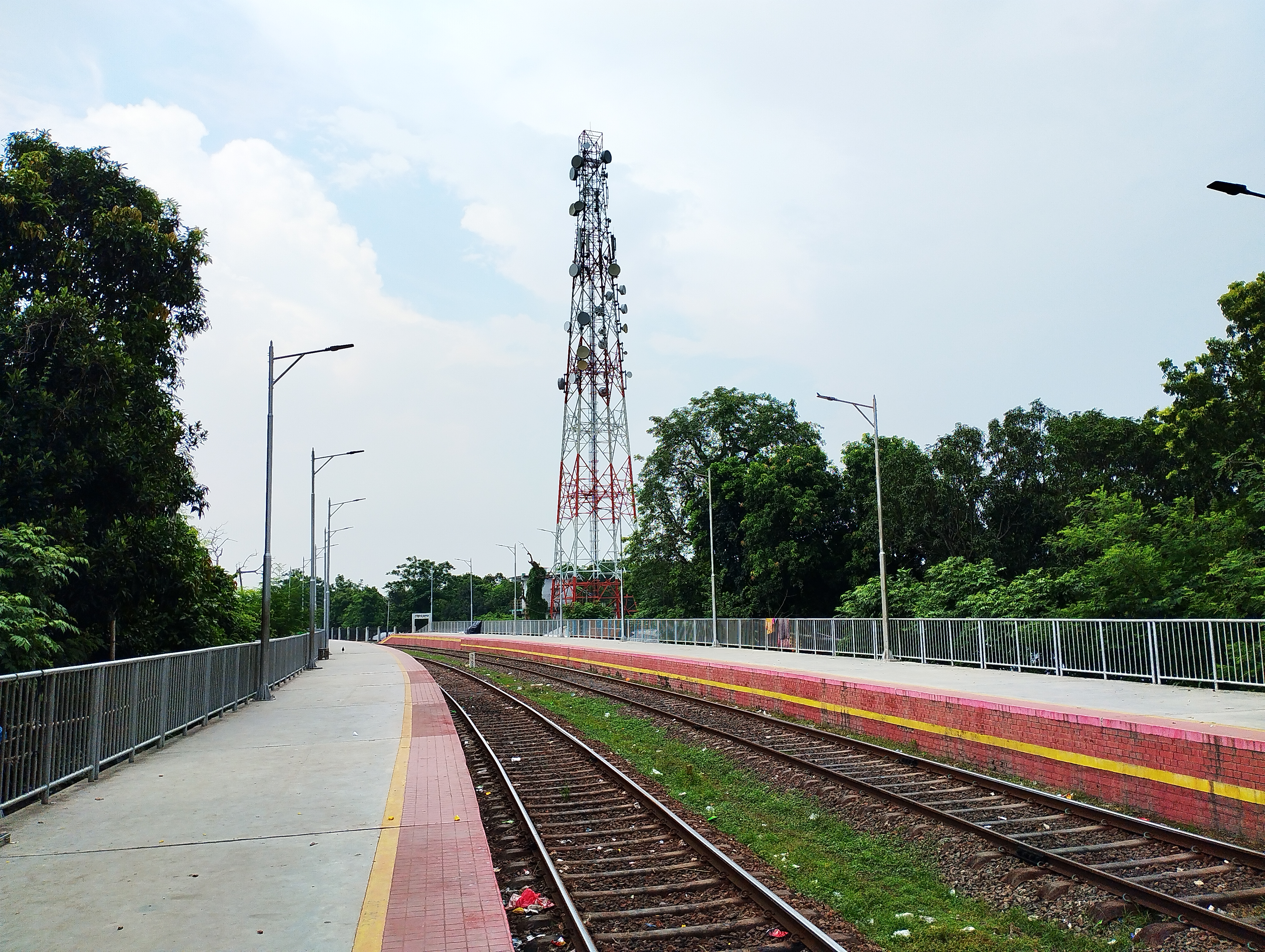
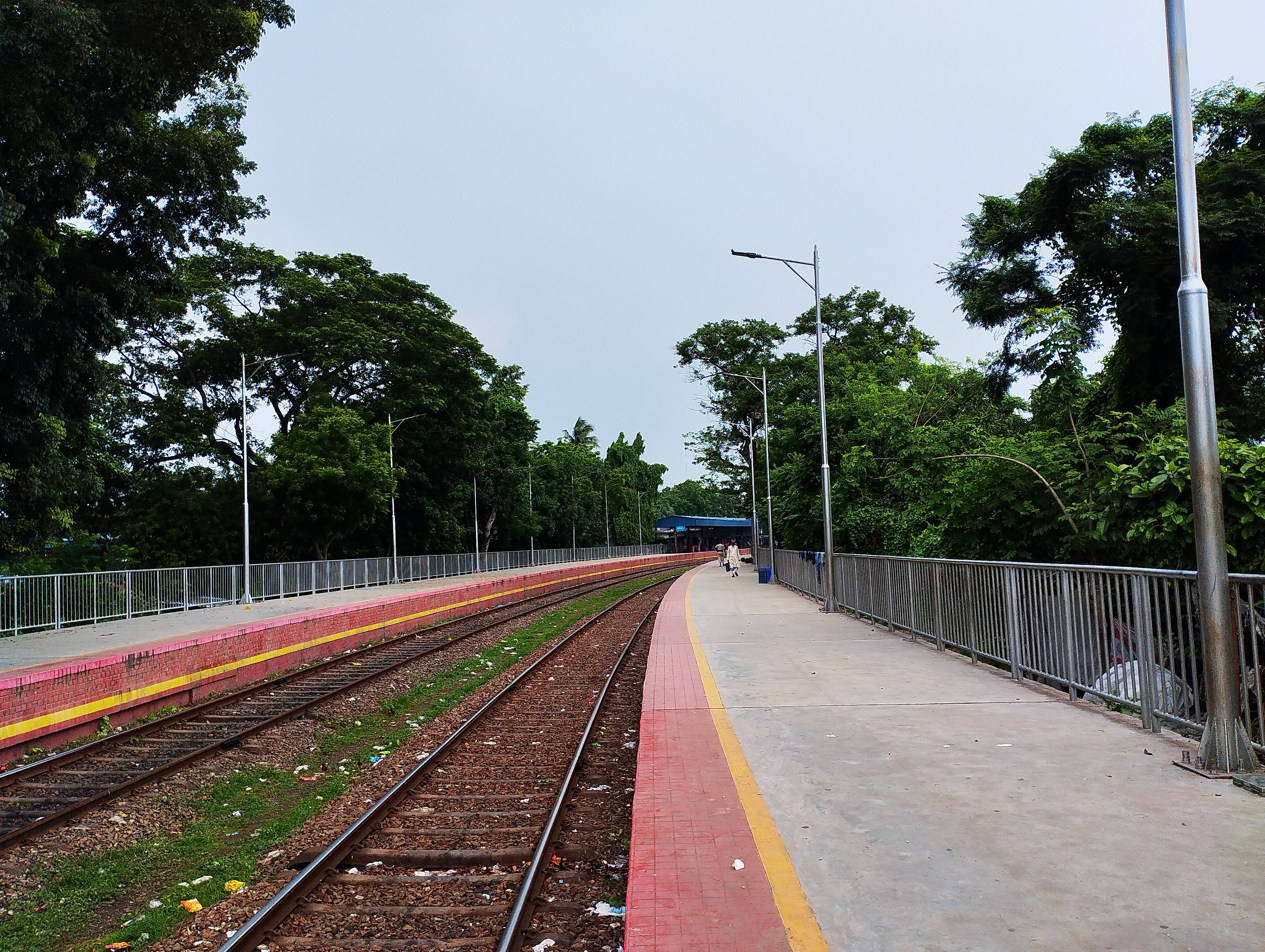
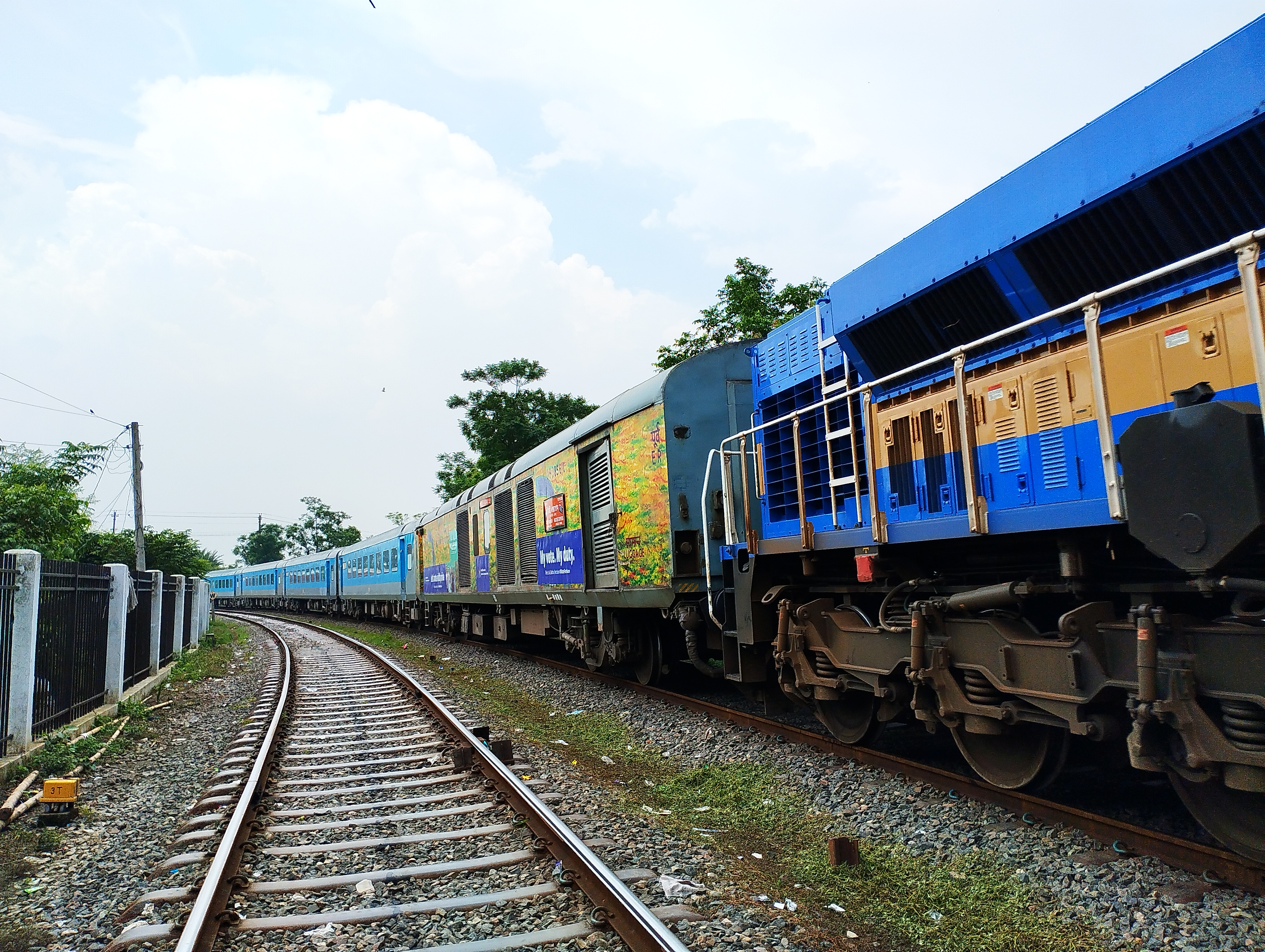
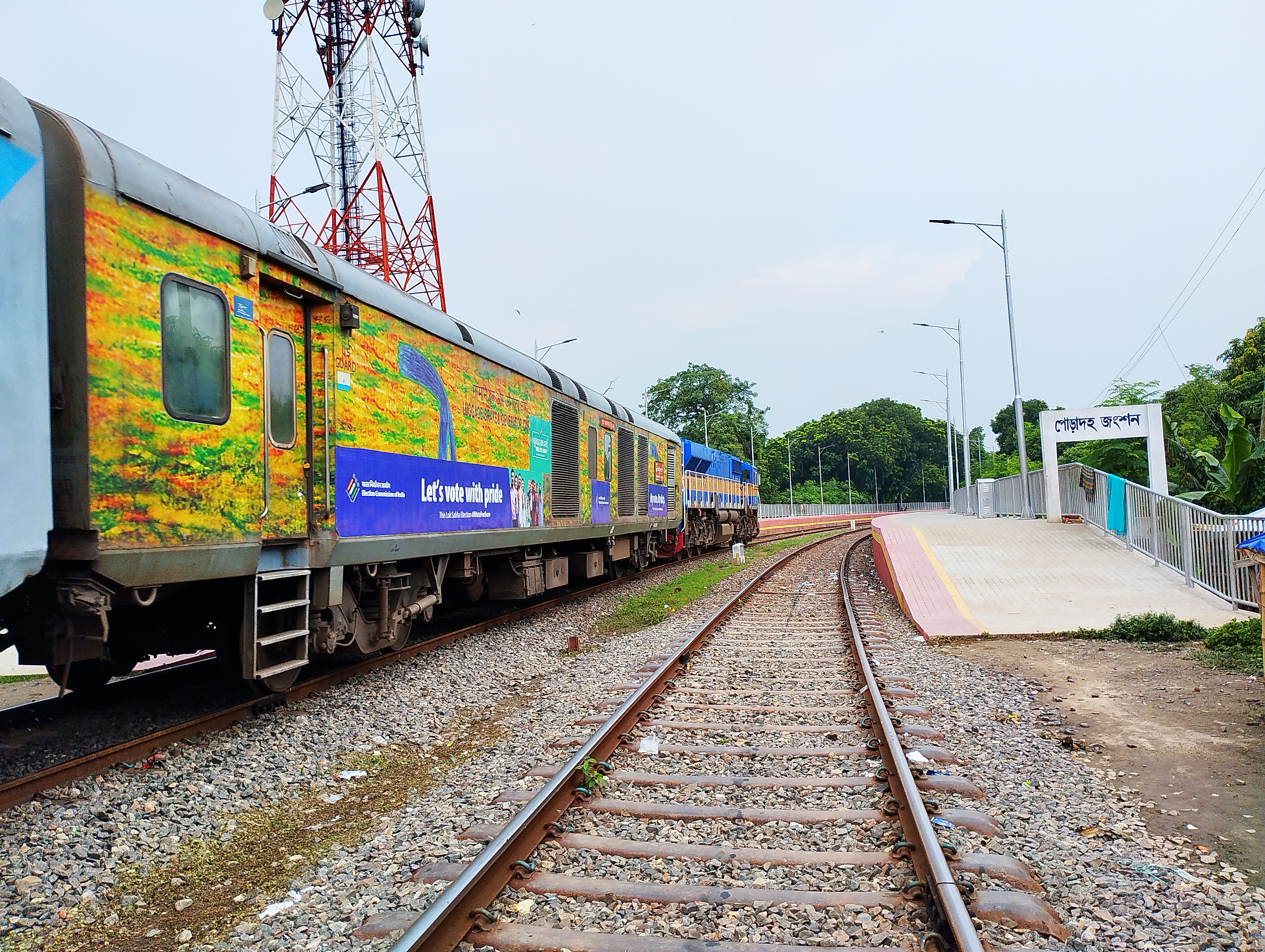
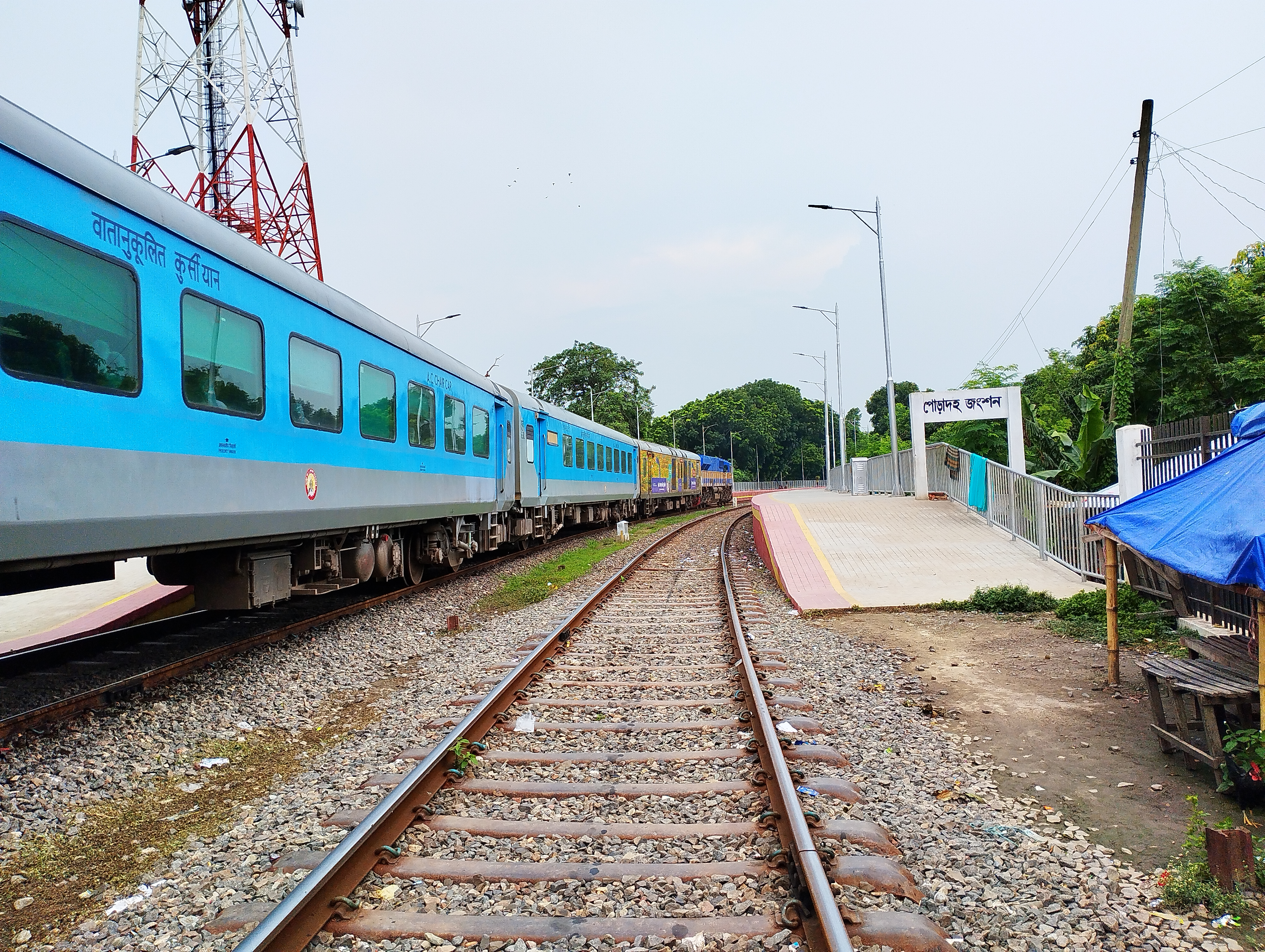
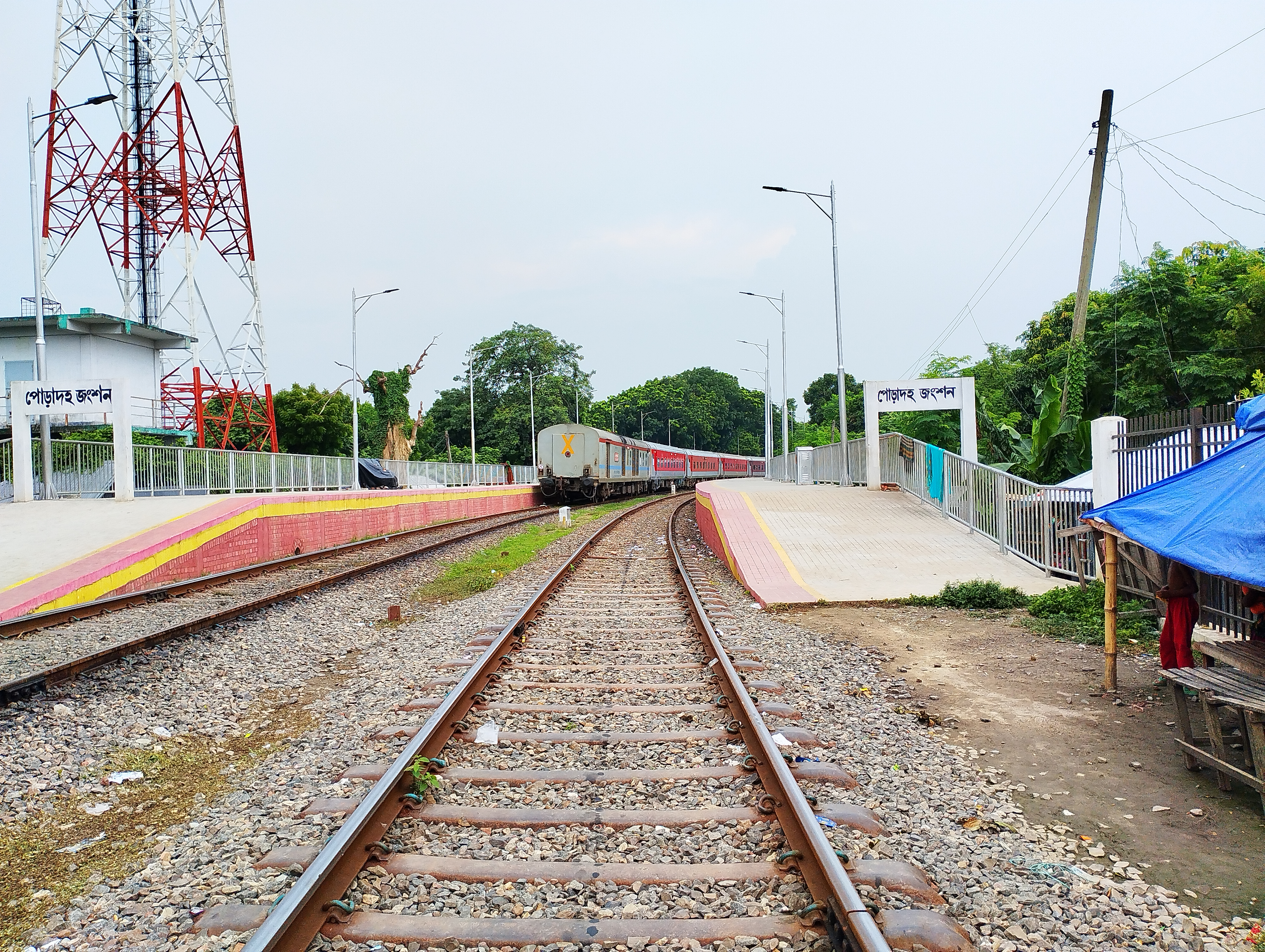
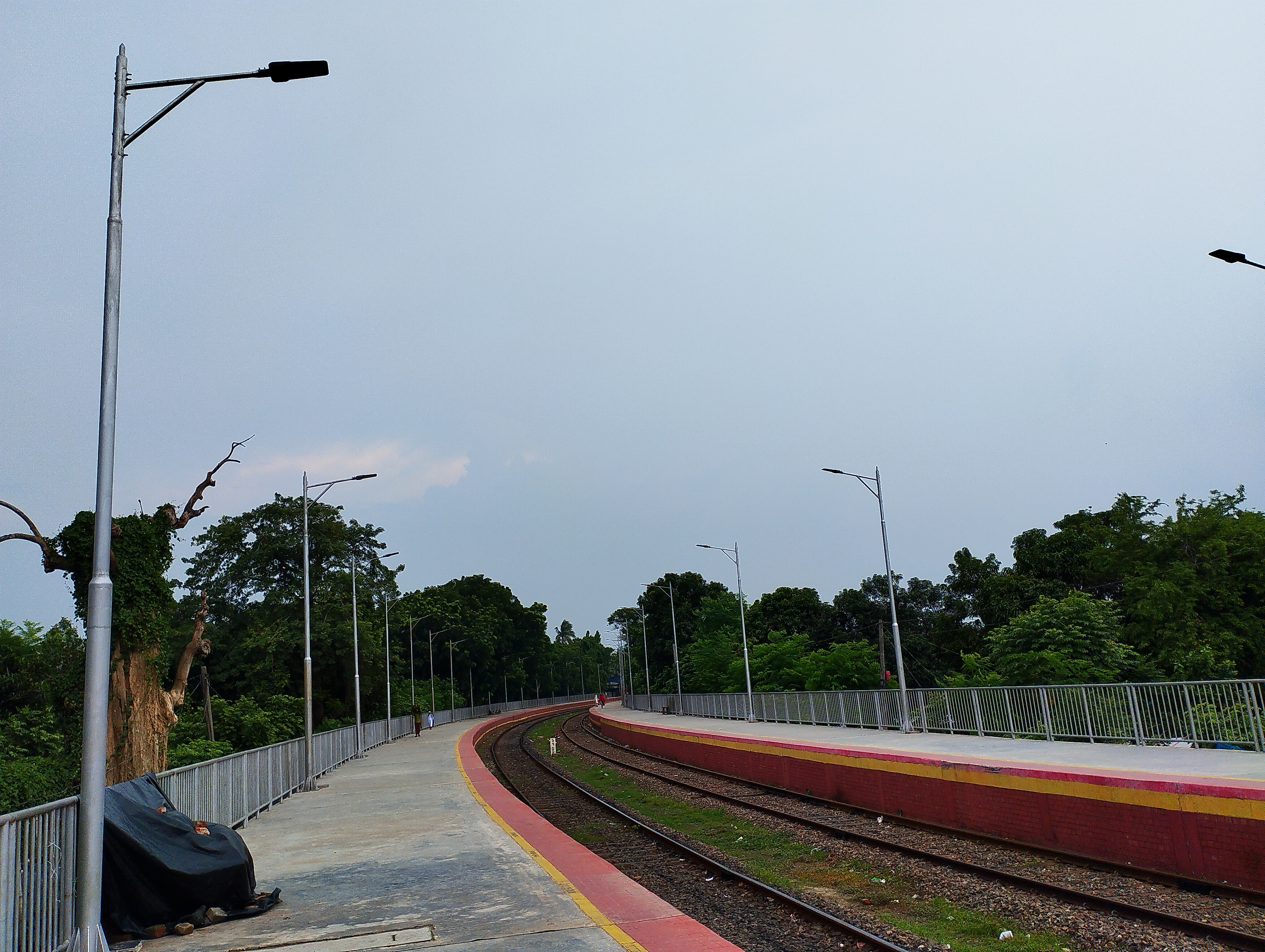
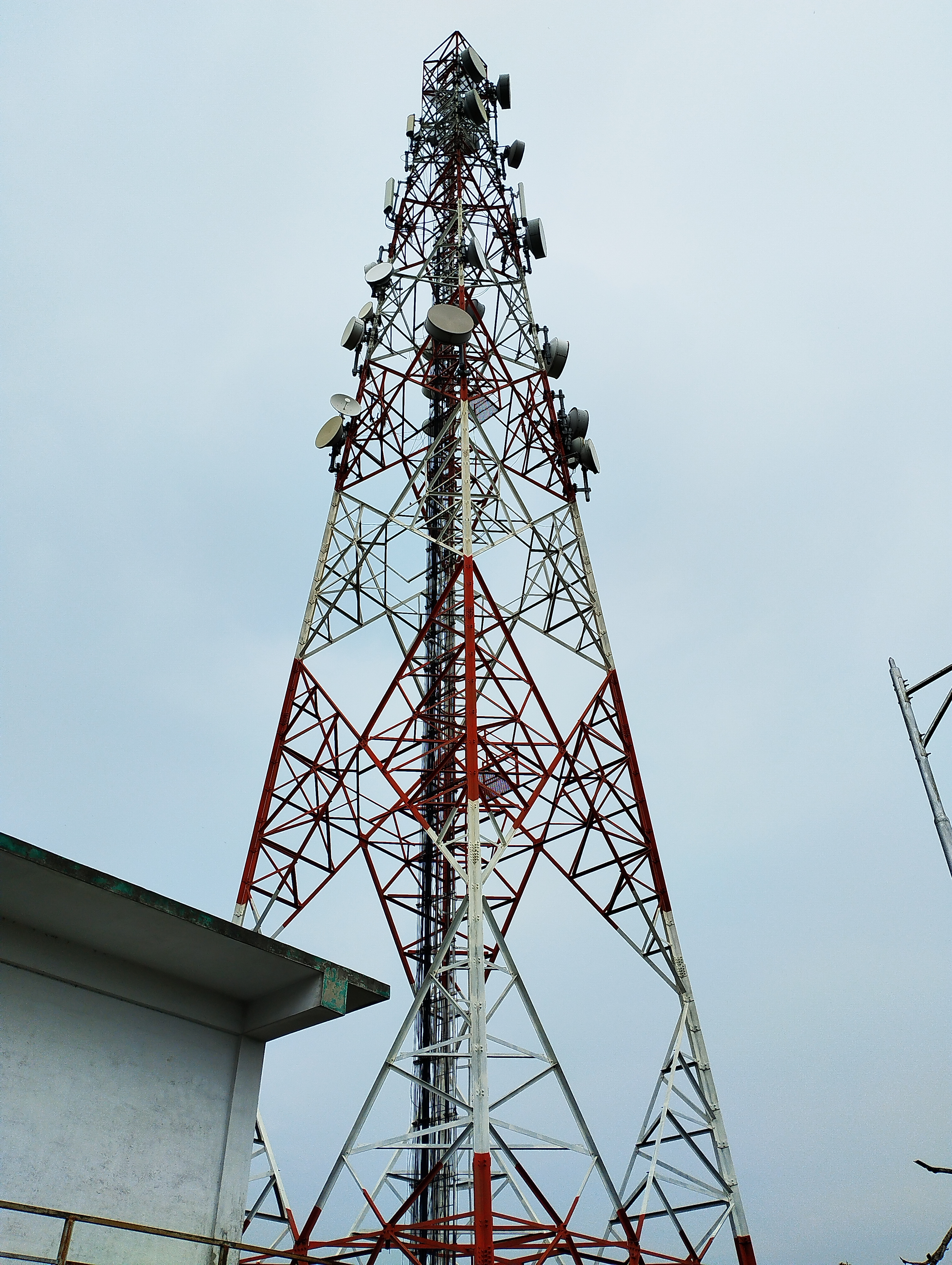
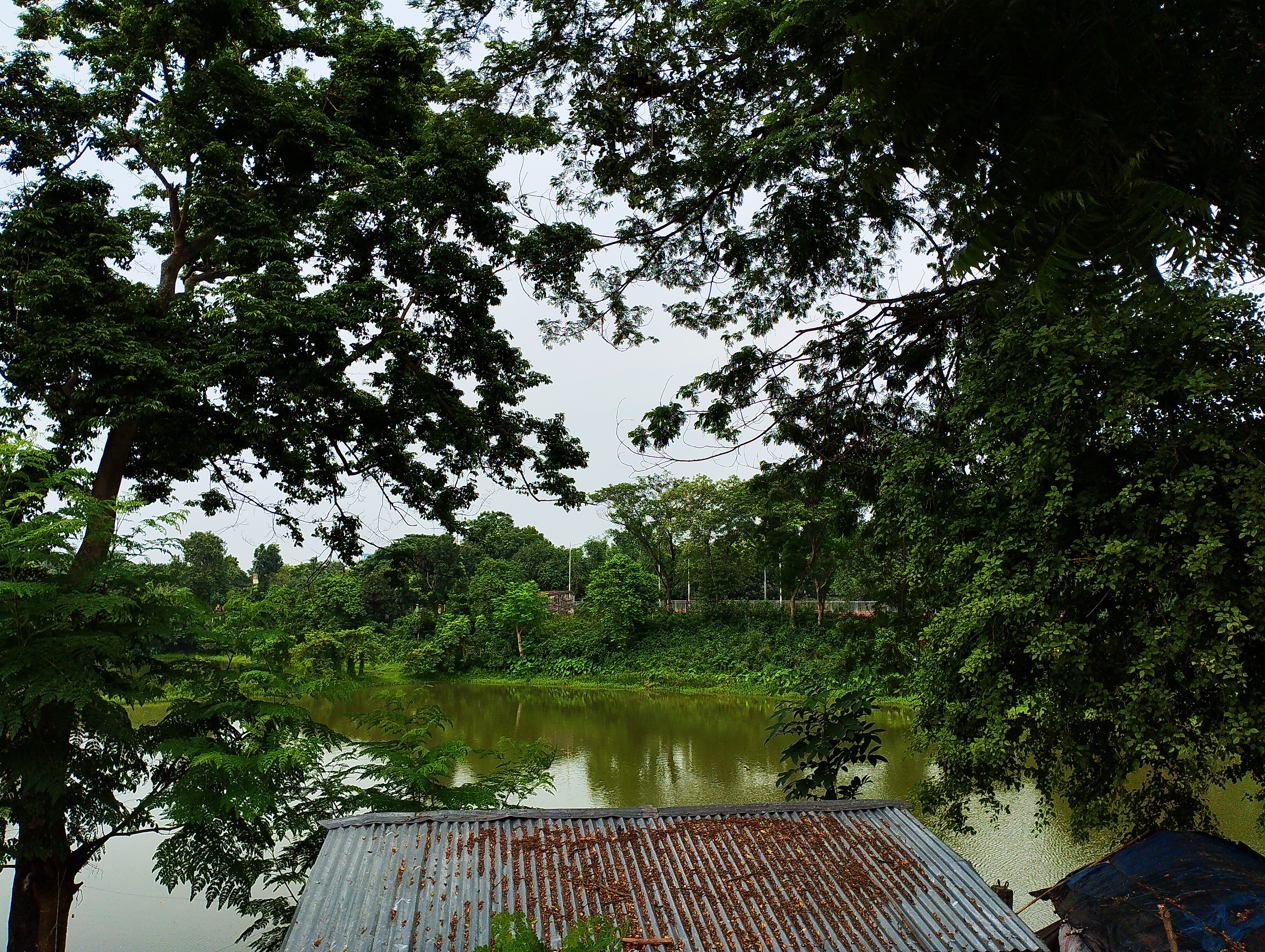
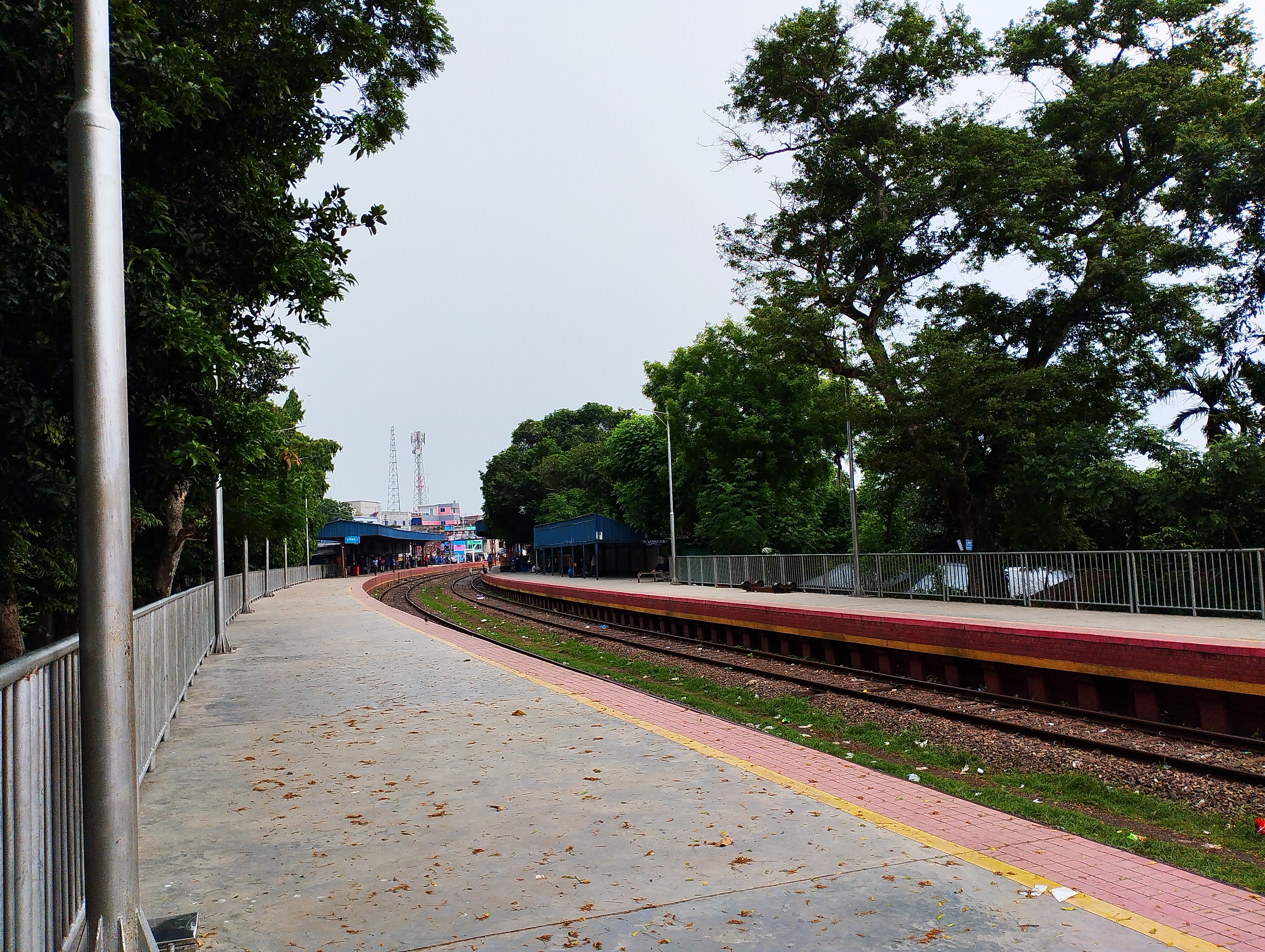
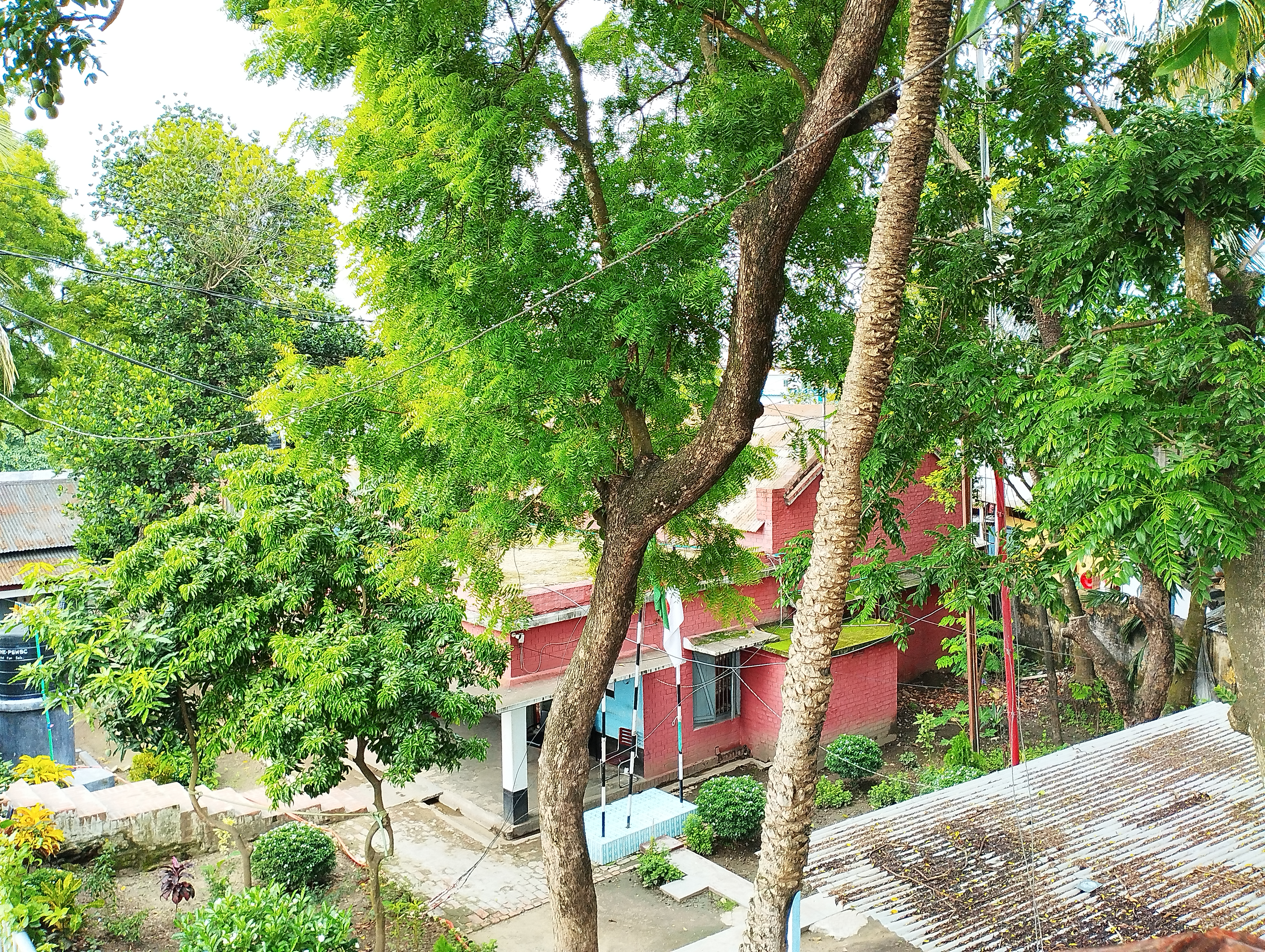
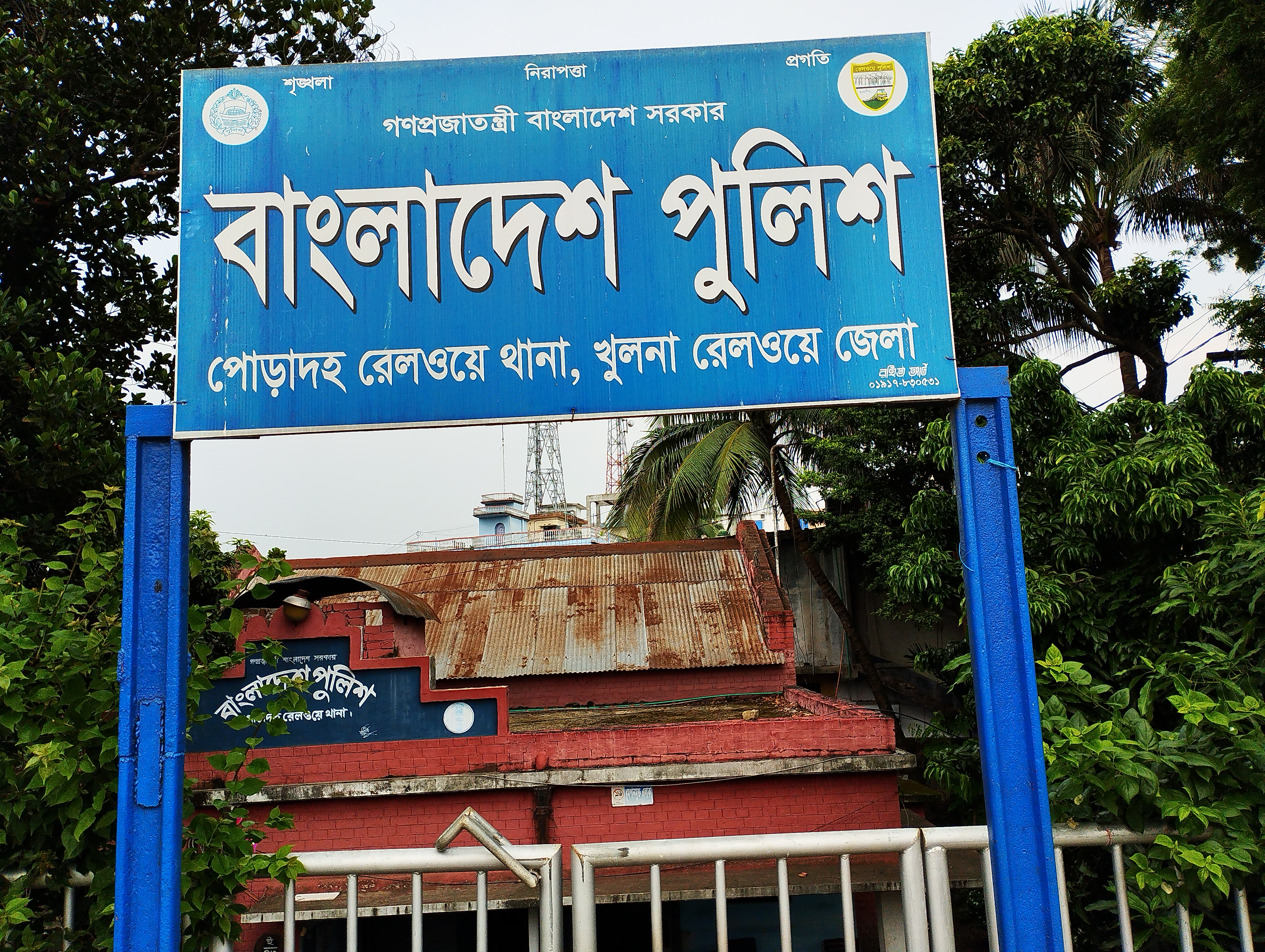
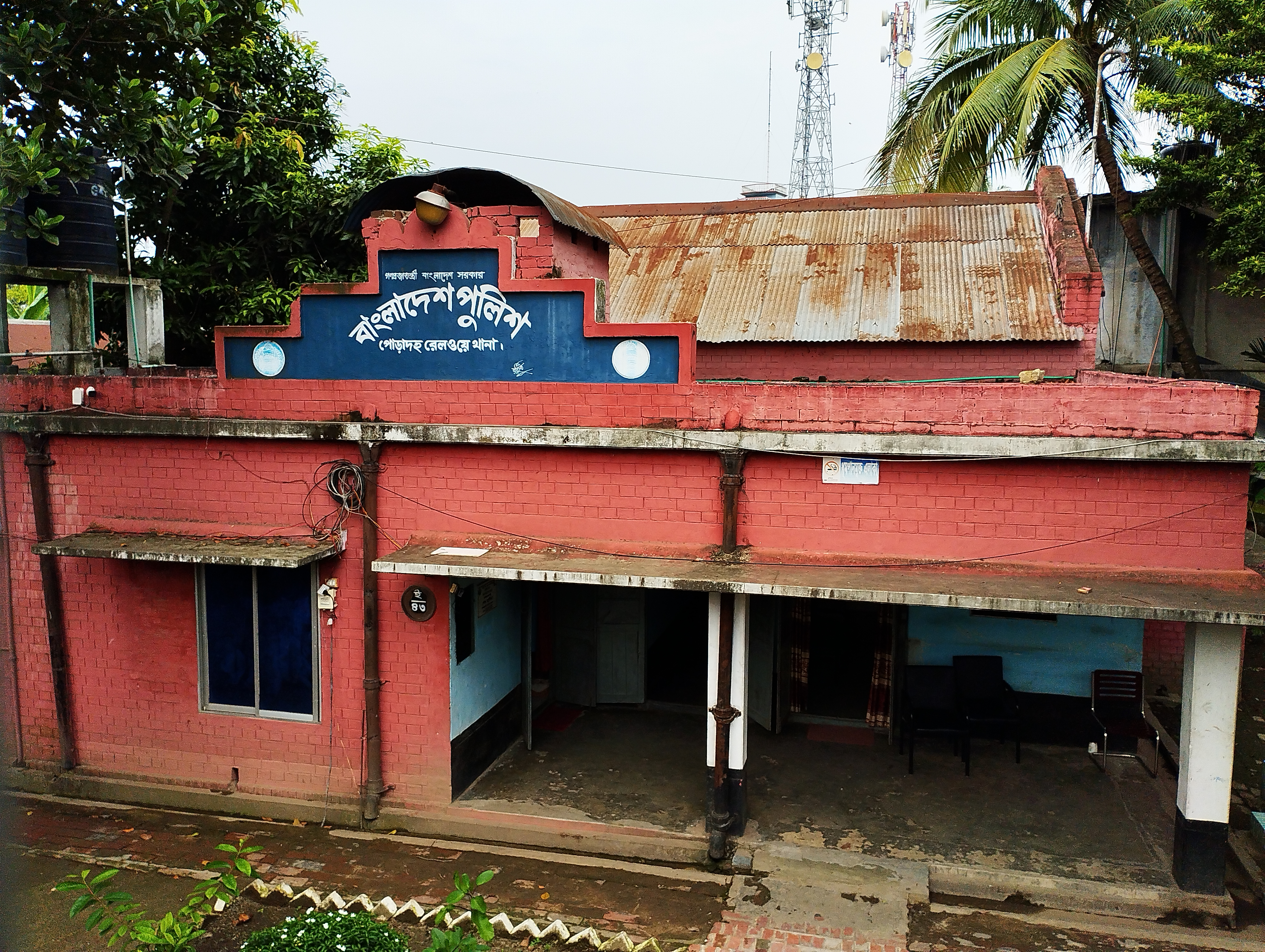
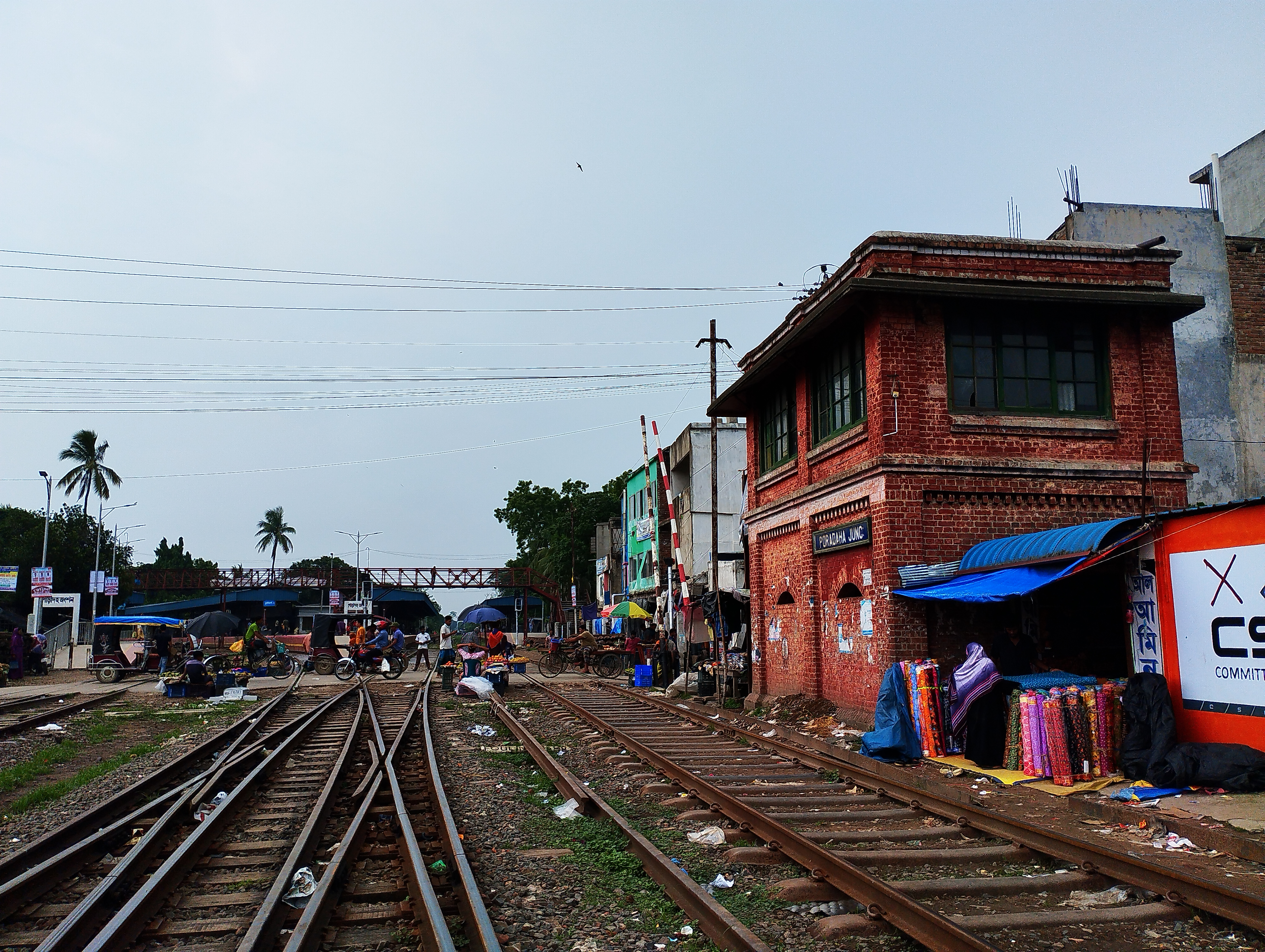
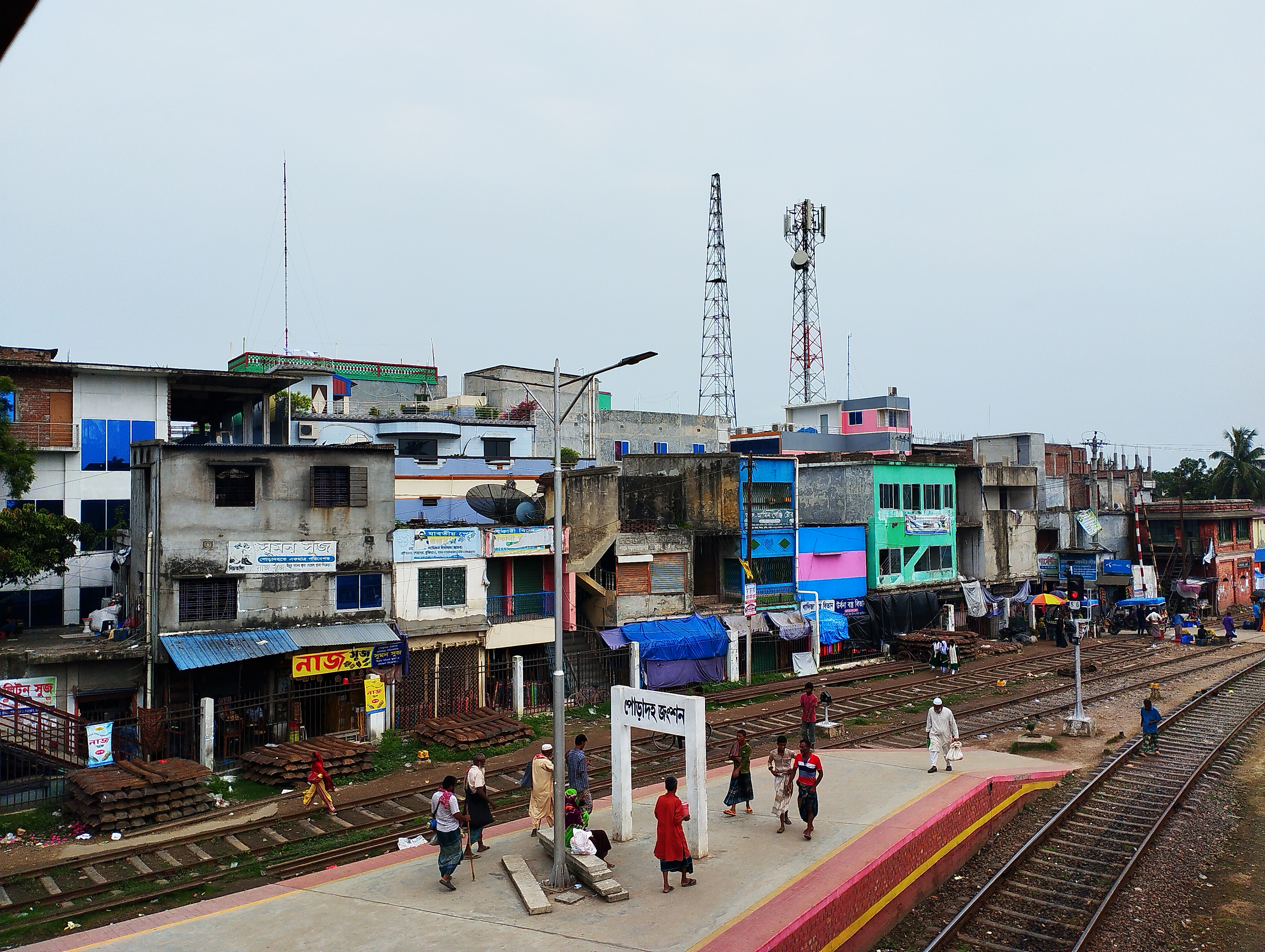
