= Thanapara, Kushtia =

Thanapara
- Ward of Kushtia Municipality
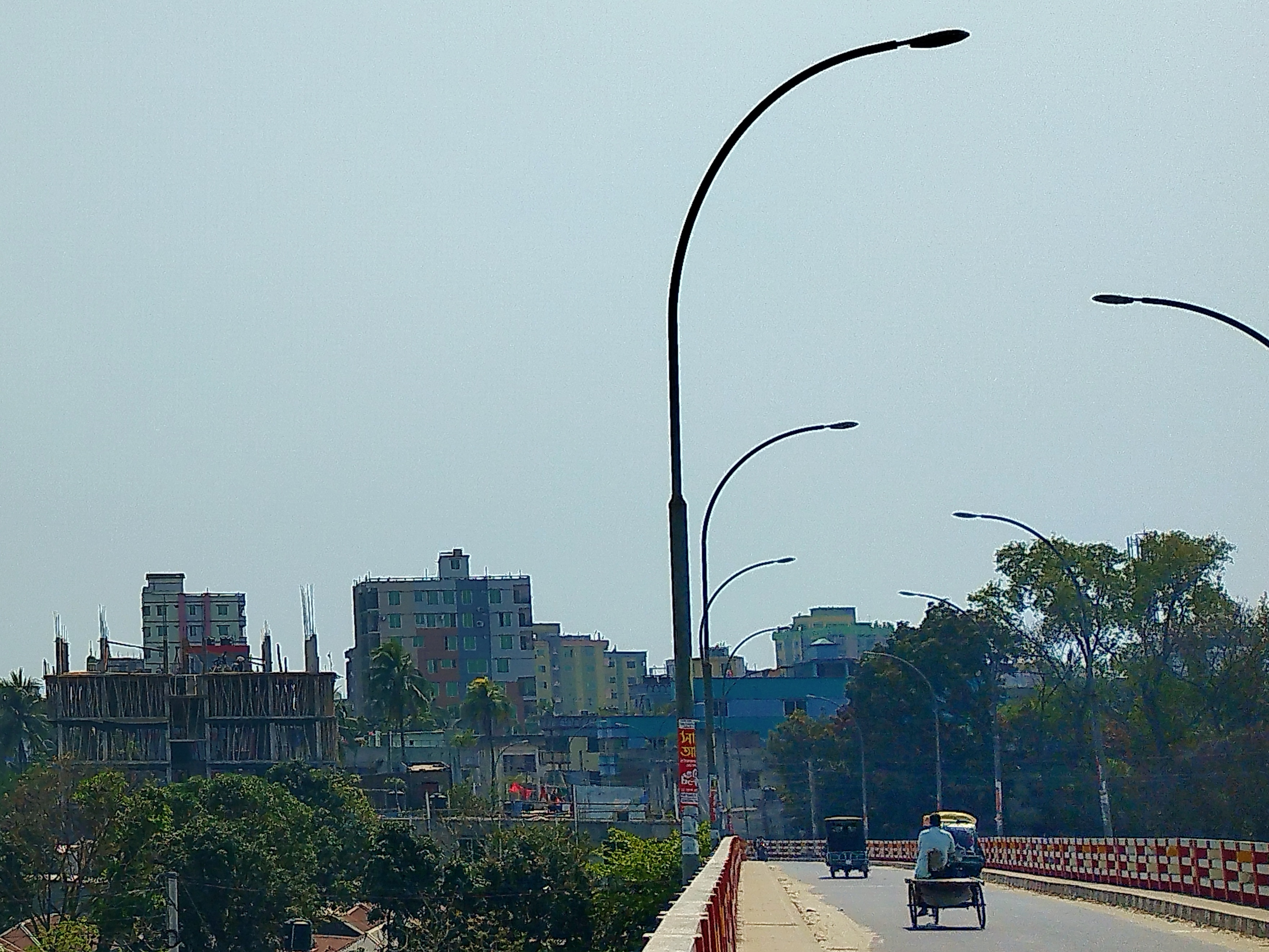
- Partial view of Thanapara from Haripur Bridge
- Interactive map of Thanapara
- Coordinates: 23.910955°N 89.128417°E
- Country: Bangladesh
- Municipality: Kushtia

Thanapara is a neighborhood of Kushtia city situated on the bank of the Gorai River. Every year on 28 August Thanapara Massacre Day is observed in remembrance of a tragic event. Many of Kushtia's historic and important institutions and structures are located in Thanapara.

Among government offices, the area houses the Kushtia Model Police Station, Kushtia Zila Parishad, the Kushtia office of the Bangladesh Water Development Board, and the Kushtia office of the Bangladesh Fire Service and Civil Defence. It also includes three major intersections of the city: Panch Rastar Mor (Five Road Junction), Six Road Junction, and Thana Mor (Shadhinata Chattar).

== History ==
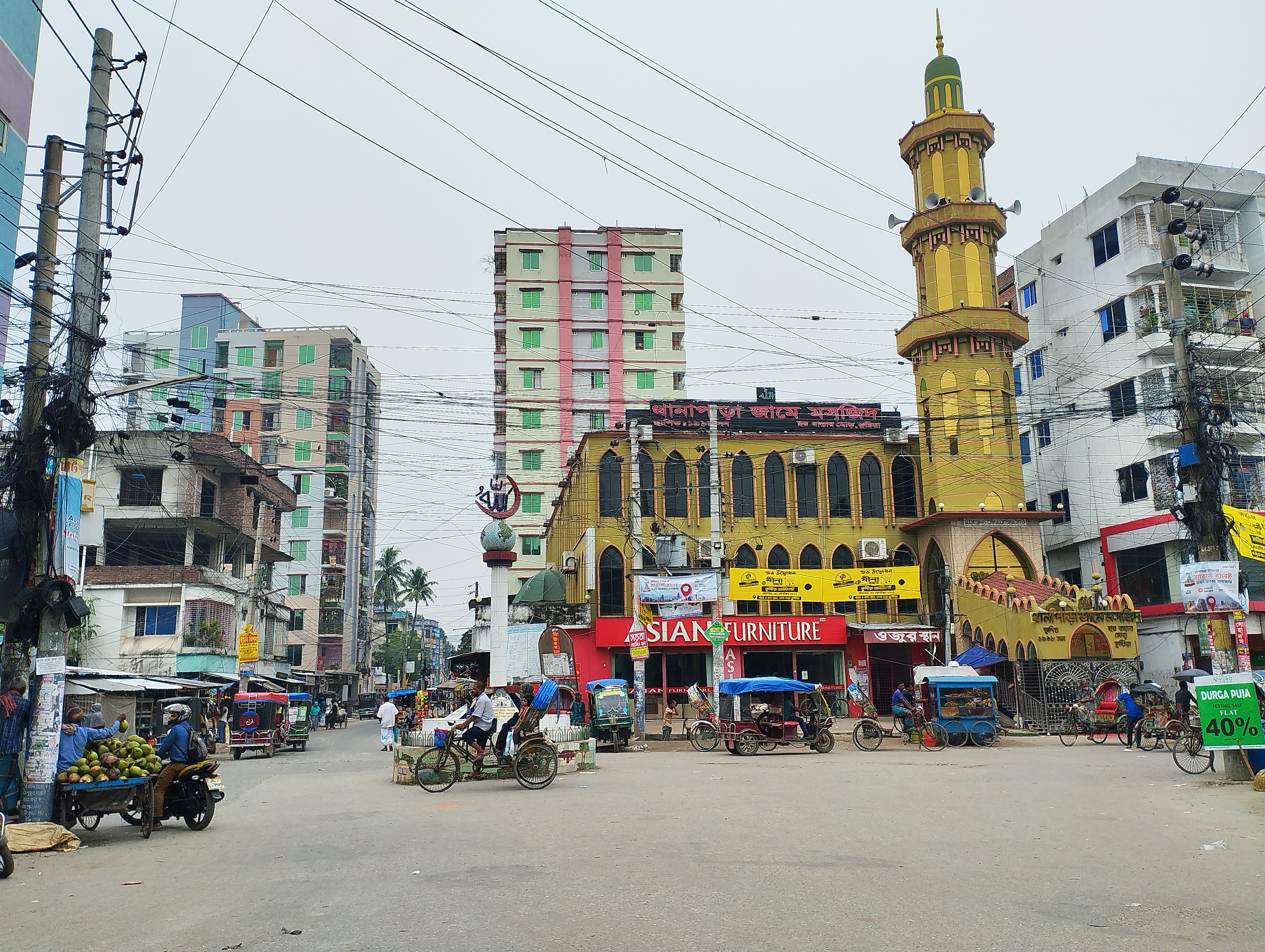
The Six Road Junction where 8–10 youths were killed during the Bangladesh Liberation War

Several prominent institutions were established in Thanapara St John's Cathedral, Kushtia in 1850, Kushtia High School in 1860, Kushtia Central Jame Masjid in 1896, Kushtia Public Library in 1913, Kushtia Islamia College in 1968.

== Notable people ==
- Mohammad Badruddoza – Former Member of Parliament from Kushtia-3
- Milton Khondokar – Bangladeshi lyricist, music director, and film director

== Gallery ==
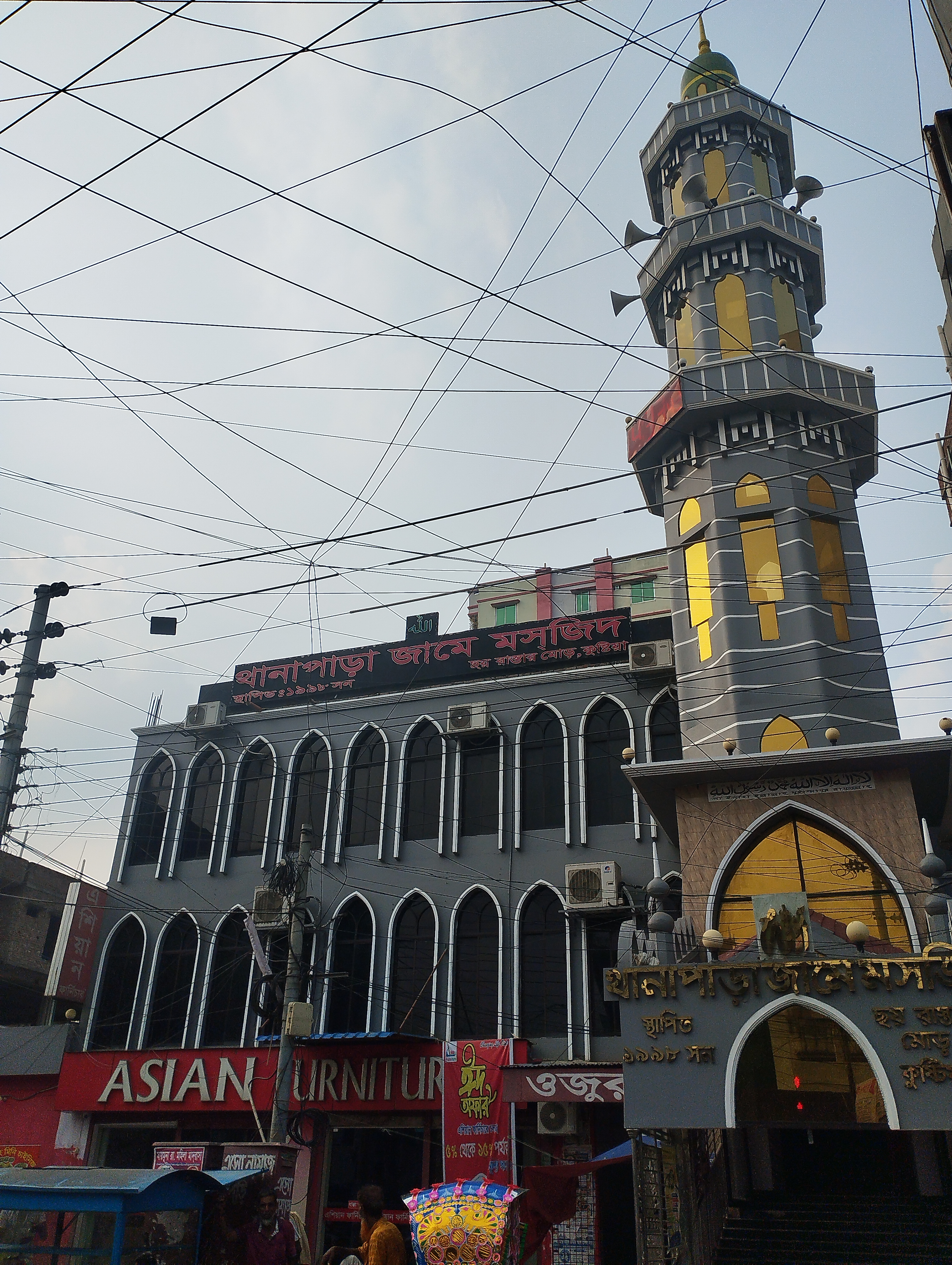
Thanapara Jame Mosque, established in 1998

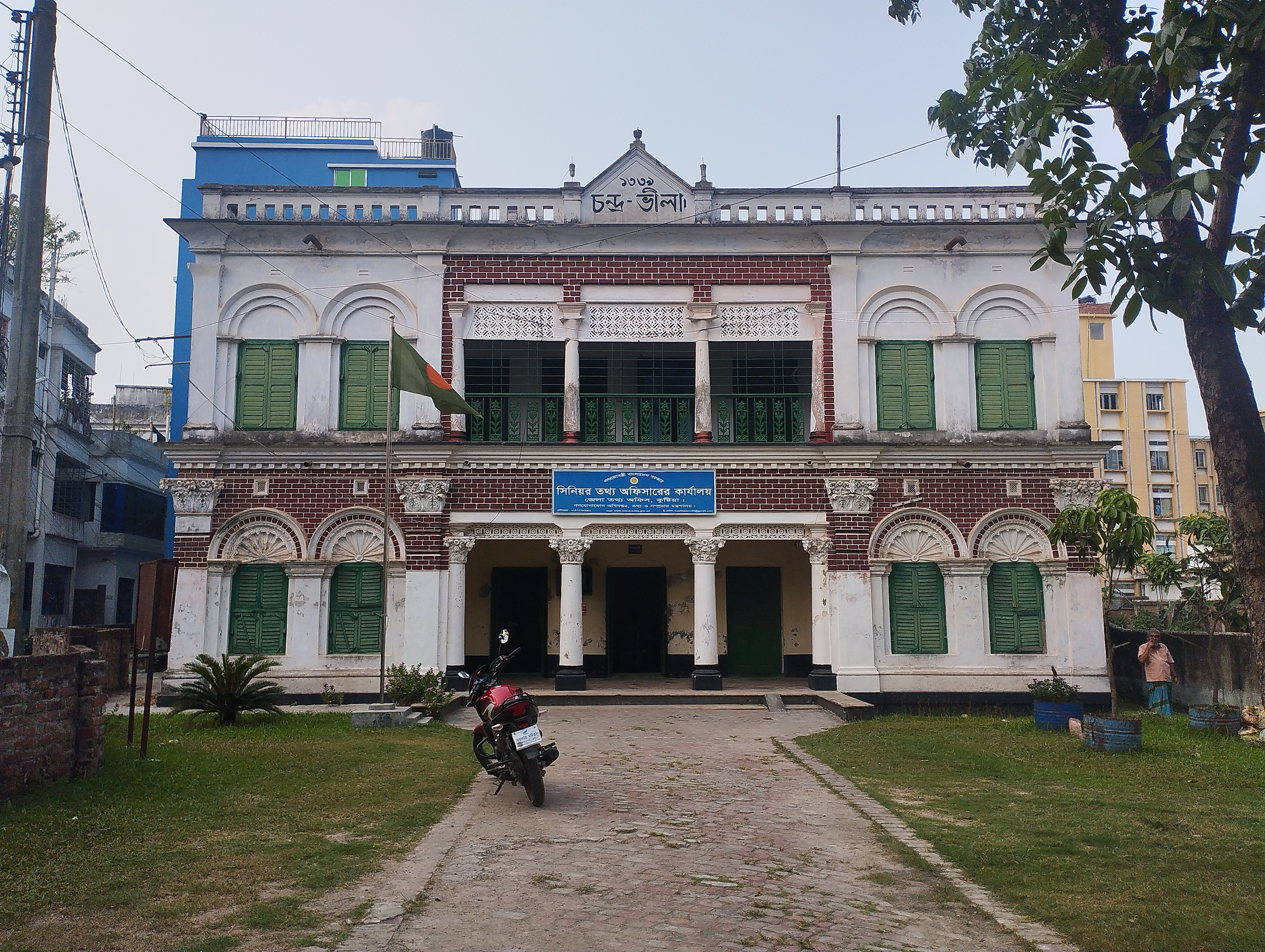
Chandra Villa, built in 1932

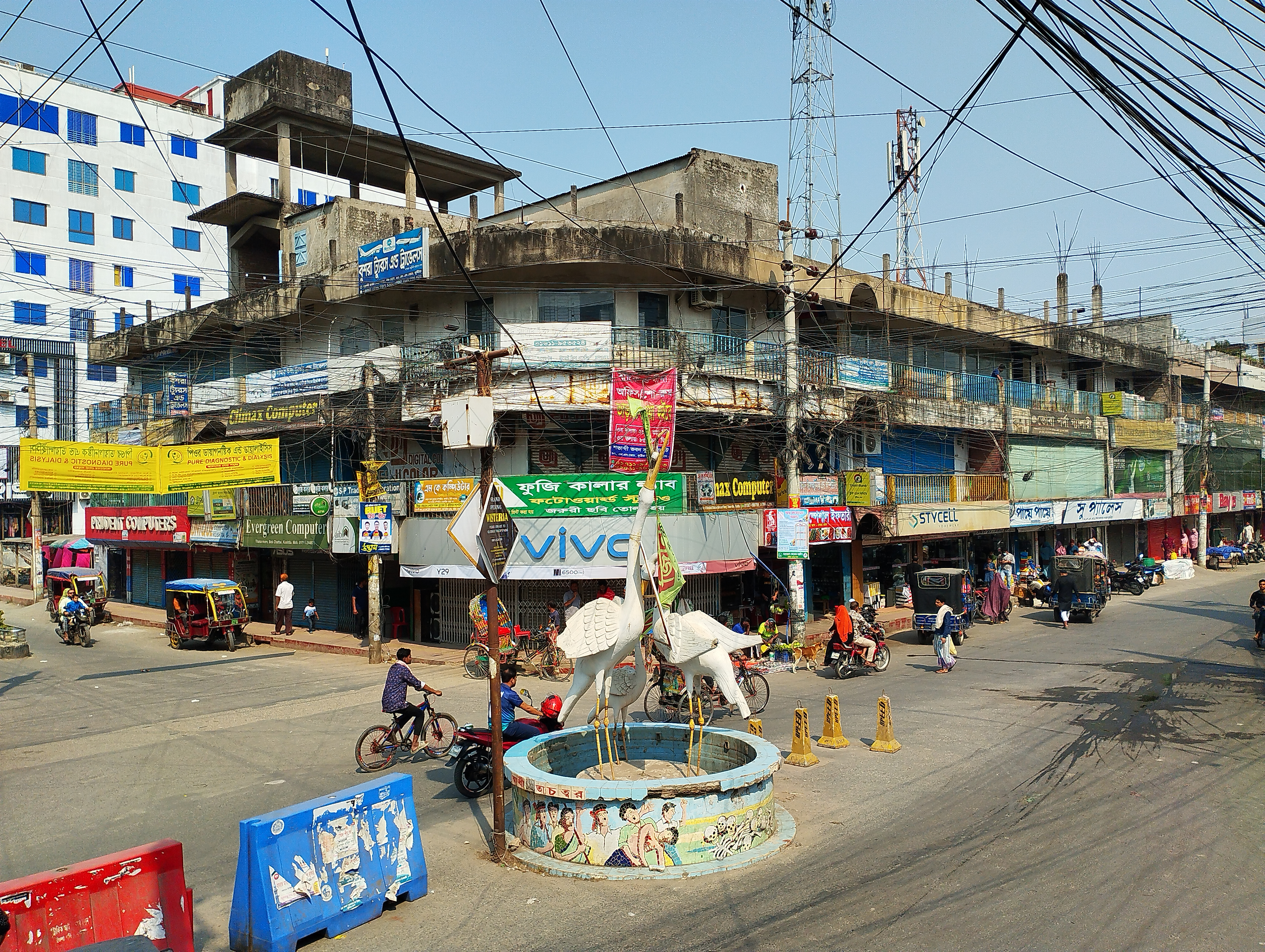
Thana Mor (Junction)

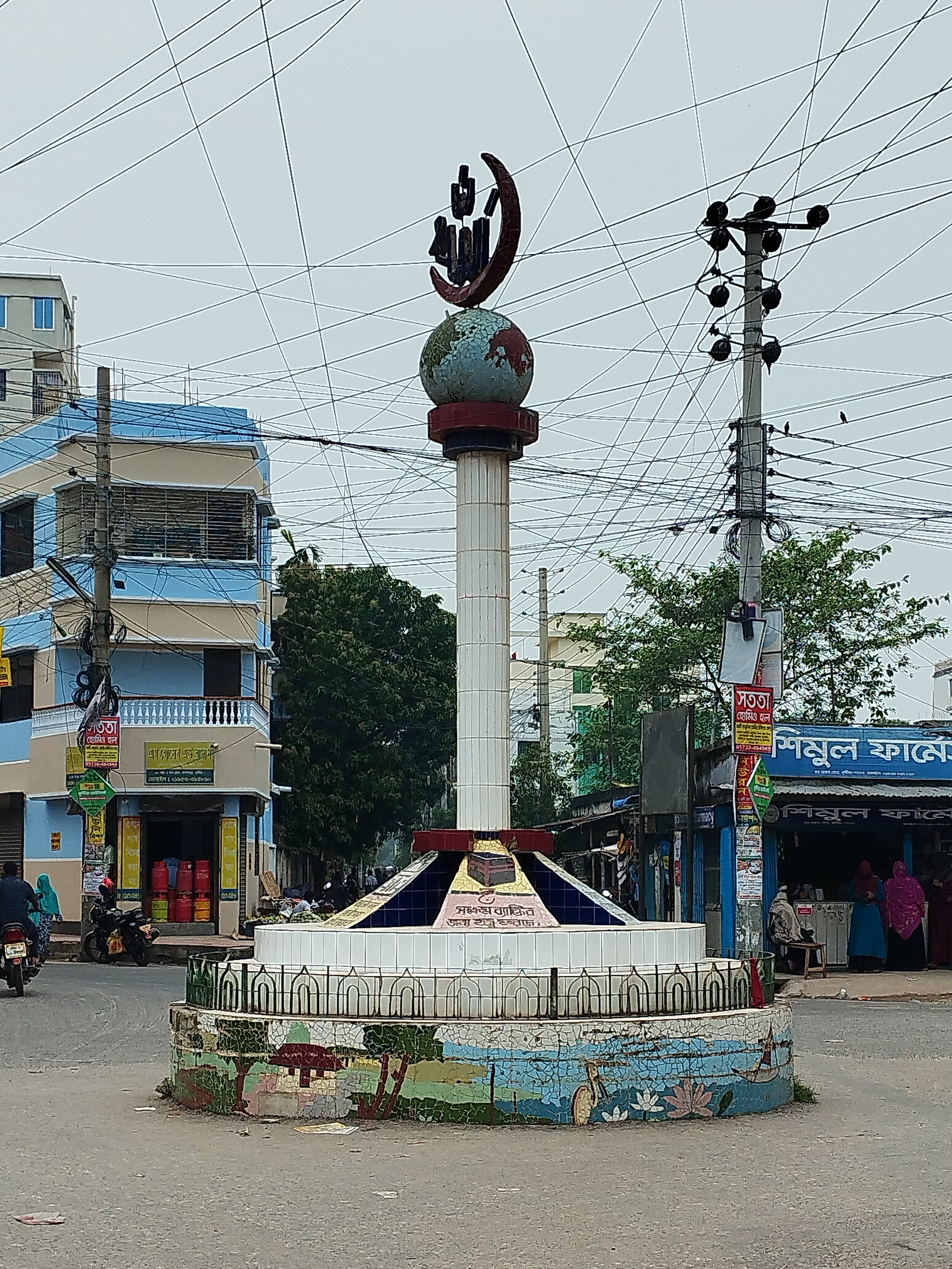
Structure at the Six Road Junction

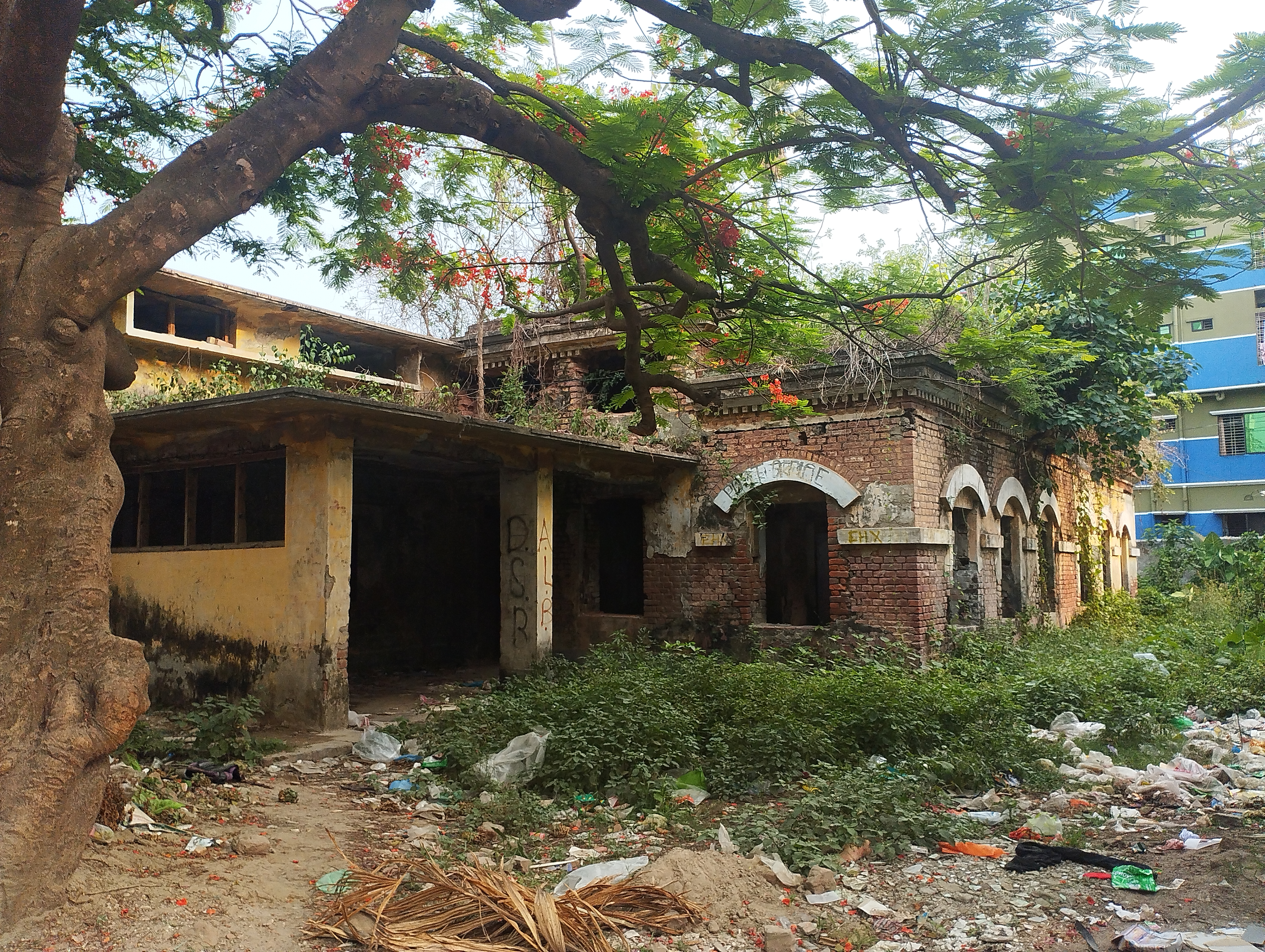
Old post office located in Thanapara

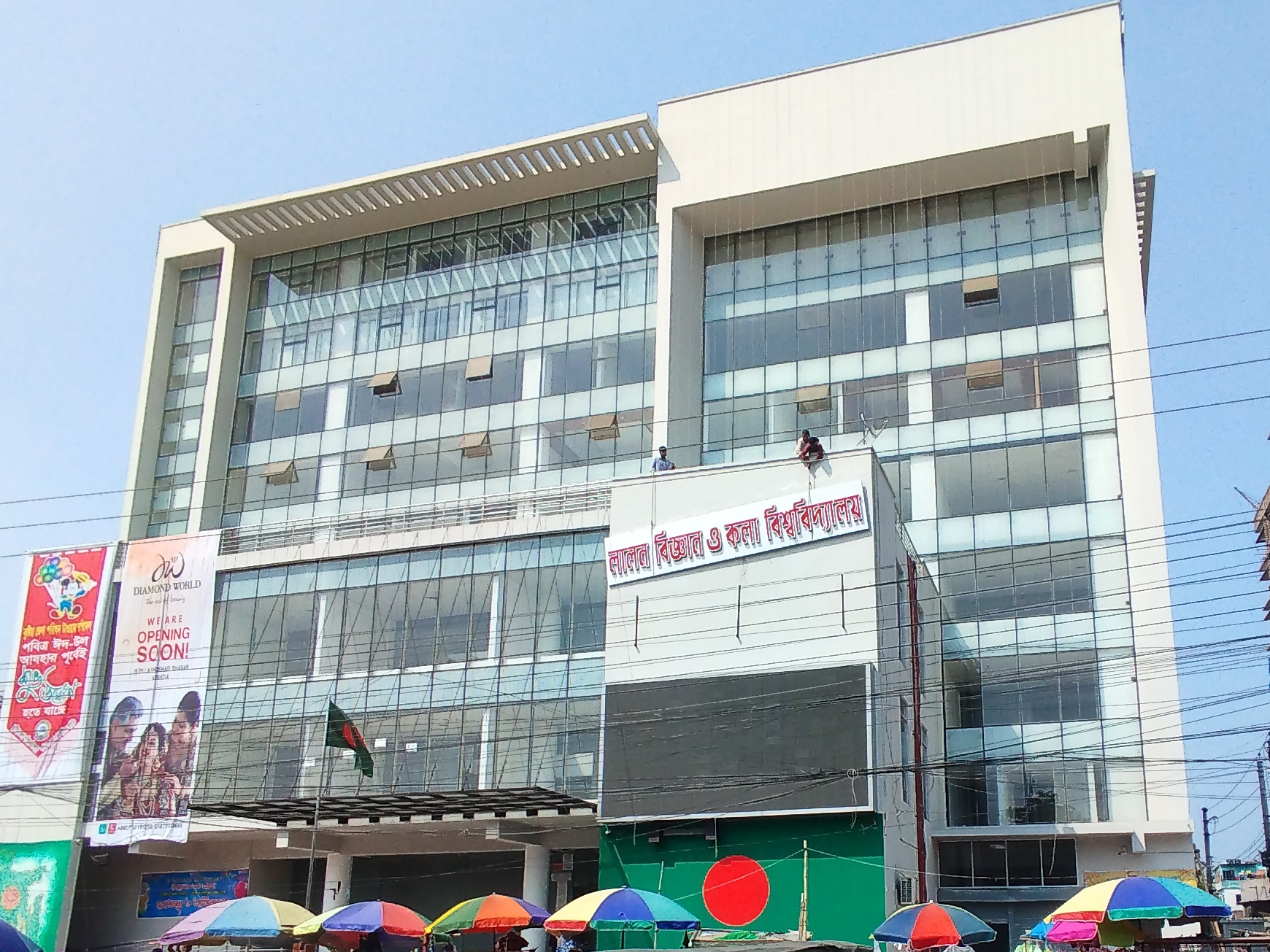
Kushtia Zilla Parishad Shopping Mall

== External ==
- Media related to Thanapara, Kushtia at Wikimedia Commons
