= The Old Kushtia High School =

Location
- Haripur, Hatsh Haripur Union, Kushtia Sadar Upazila; Bangladesh
- Coordinates: 23.9284°N 89.1277°E

Information
- School type: MPO Secondary school
- Established: 1905; 121 years ago
- School board: Board of Intermediate and Secondary Education, Jashore; Bangladesh Technical Education Board
- School district: Kushtia District
- School number: 117769 (EIIN)
- President: Abdul Quddus
- Headmaster: Md. Ashraful Haque
- Gender: Boys and girls
- Classes: 6th-10th
- Language: Bangla
- Campuses: 1
- Campus type: Rural
- Website: theoldkushtiasecondaryschool.jessoreboard.gov.bd

The Old Kushtia High School (Bengali: দি ওল্ড কুষ্টিয়া হাই স্কুল) is a secondary school located in Haripur of Hatsh Haripur Union of Kushtia Sadar Upazila of Kushtia District. Haripur area of Kushtia Sadar Upazila is known as Old Kushtia. Hence the name of the school is The Old Kushtia High School. The school was established in 1905. In 2008 the school got affiliation with Bangladesh Technical Education Board.
