= Kushtia Islamia College =

University college in Kushtia, Bangladesh

- কুষ্টিয়া ইসলামিয়া কলেজ
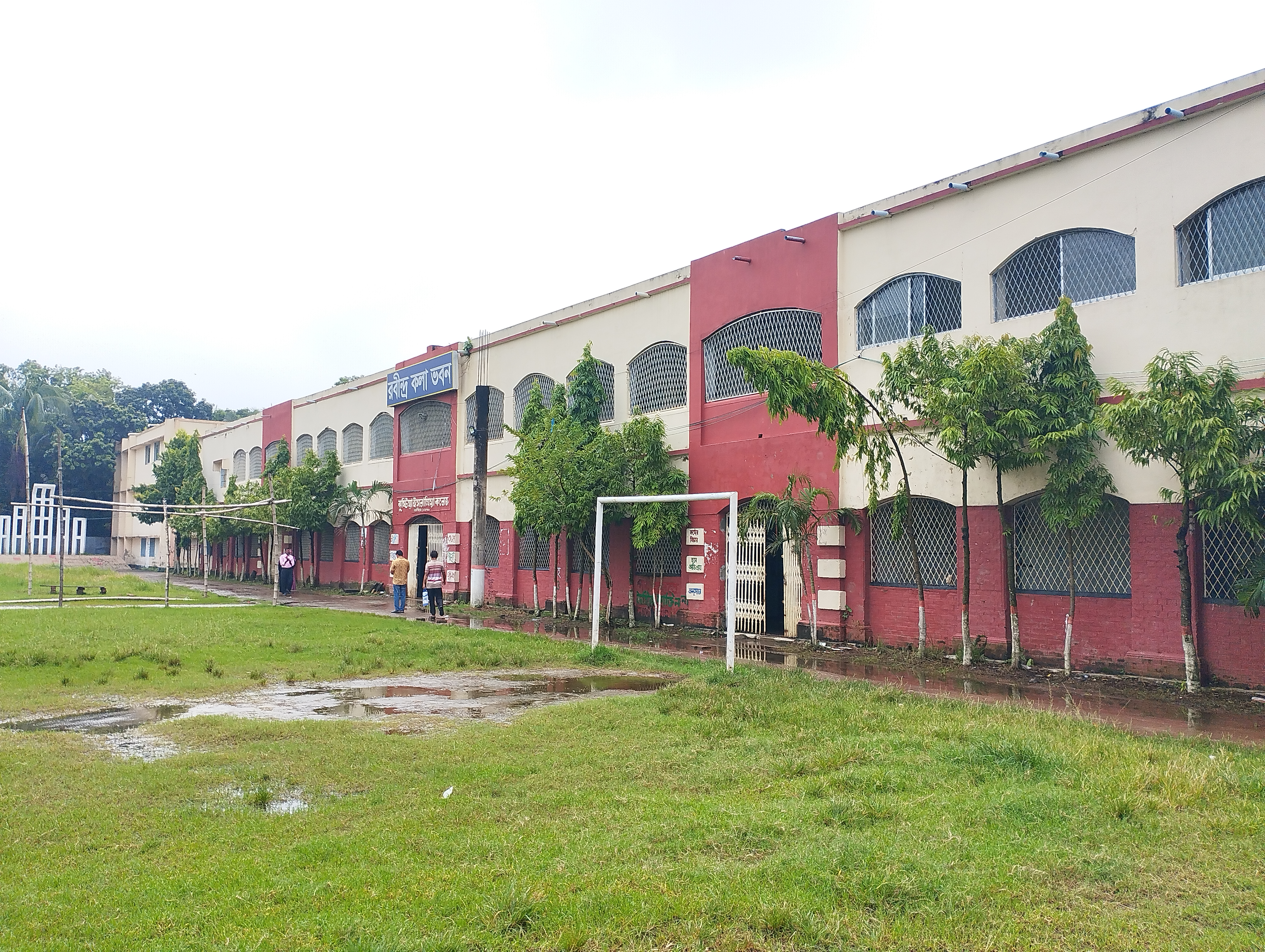
- Rabindra Kala Bhaban, which was formerly used as Kushtia Judge Court
- Type: MPO-affiliated College
- Established: 1968; 58 years ago
- Affiliations: National University
- Location: NS Road, Kushtia, Bangladesh; 23.9077638°N 89.1297888°E
- Campus: 2 acres (8,100 m^{2})
- Website: kic.edu.bd

Kushtia Islamia College (Bengali: কুষ্টিয়া ইসলামিয়া কলেজ) is a college located in Kushtia. It was established in 1968 by local residents. During the Bangladesh Liberation War, the flag of independent Bangladesh was hoisted on the college campus.

== Location ==
The college is situated in Thanapara of Mojompur Mouza, on the southern side of NS Road in the city of Kushtia. Just behind the college is the Kushtia Court railway station. On the opposite side of the college are the Kushtia Public Library and the Kushtia Central Jame Masjid. The distance from the city's zero point at Mojompur Gate to the college is approximately 1 kilometer.

== History ==
The college was established in 1968 through the efforts of the then Sub-Divisional Officer of Kushtia, Mr. Yahia, along with other prominent local figures. On March 3, 1971, the All-Party Student Struggle Council hoisted the national flag bearing the map of independent Bangladesh in the college premises. In 1992, during a BNP rally at the Kushtia Government College grounds, the demand to nationalize Islamia College was presented to the then Prime Minister Khaleda Zia. In response, she assured that the approval process would move forward in due course. The following year, in 1993, at an Awami League rally held at the Islamia College grounds, party leader Sheikh Hasina also promised that the college would be nationalized if her party came to power. Despite the passage of many years and the college fulfilling all necessary requirements to become a full-fledged institution, no progress has been made toward its nationalization.

== Subjects ==
At Kushtia Islamia College, there are 3 departments at the Higher Secondary level under the Jessore Board. Under the National University, there are 4 types of bachelor's degree (pass) courses, 12 subjects for bachelor's degree honors courses, and 5 subjects for master's final courses.

Degree	No.	Department
Higher Secondary	01	Science
Higher Secondary	02	Humanities
Higher Secondary	03	Business Studies
Bachelor (Pass)	01	B.A.
Bachelor (Pass)	02	B.S.S.
Bachelor (Pass)	03	B.Sc.
Bachelor (Pass)	04	B.B.S.
Bachelor (Honors)	01	Bangla
Bachelor (Honors)	02	History
Bachelor (Honors)	03	Islamic History and Culture
Bachelor (Honors)	04	Philosophy
Bachelor (Honors)	05	Political Science
Bachelor (Honors)	06	Sociology
Bachelor (Honors)	07	Economics
Bachelor (Honors)	08	Marketing
Bachelor (Honors)	09	Finance and Banking
Bachelor (Honors)	10	Accounting
Bachelor (Honors)	11	Management
Bachelor (Honors)	12	Geography and Environment
Master's Final	01	Bangla
Master's Final	02	Philosophy
Master's Final	03	Political Science
Master's Final	04	Sociology
Master's Final	05	Economics

== Campus ==
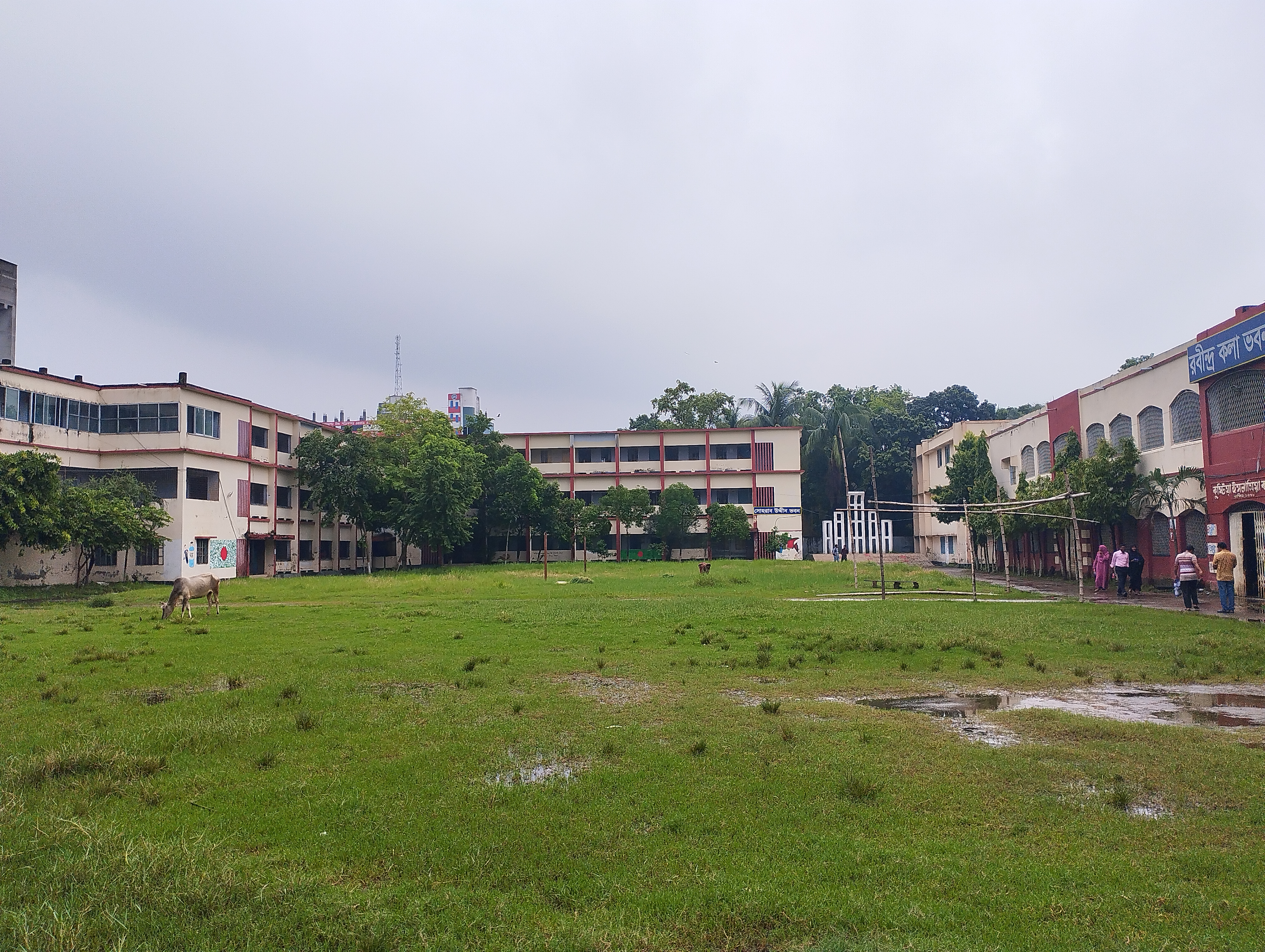
The academic building on the left and Rabindra Kala Bhaban on the right

The lively and vibrant campus spans 2 acres, filled with the chatter of students in a picturesque setting. The college has four buildings.

== Gallery ==
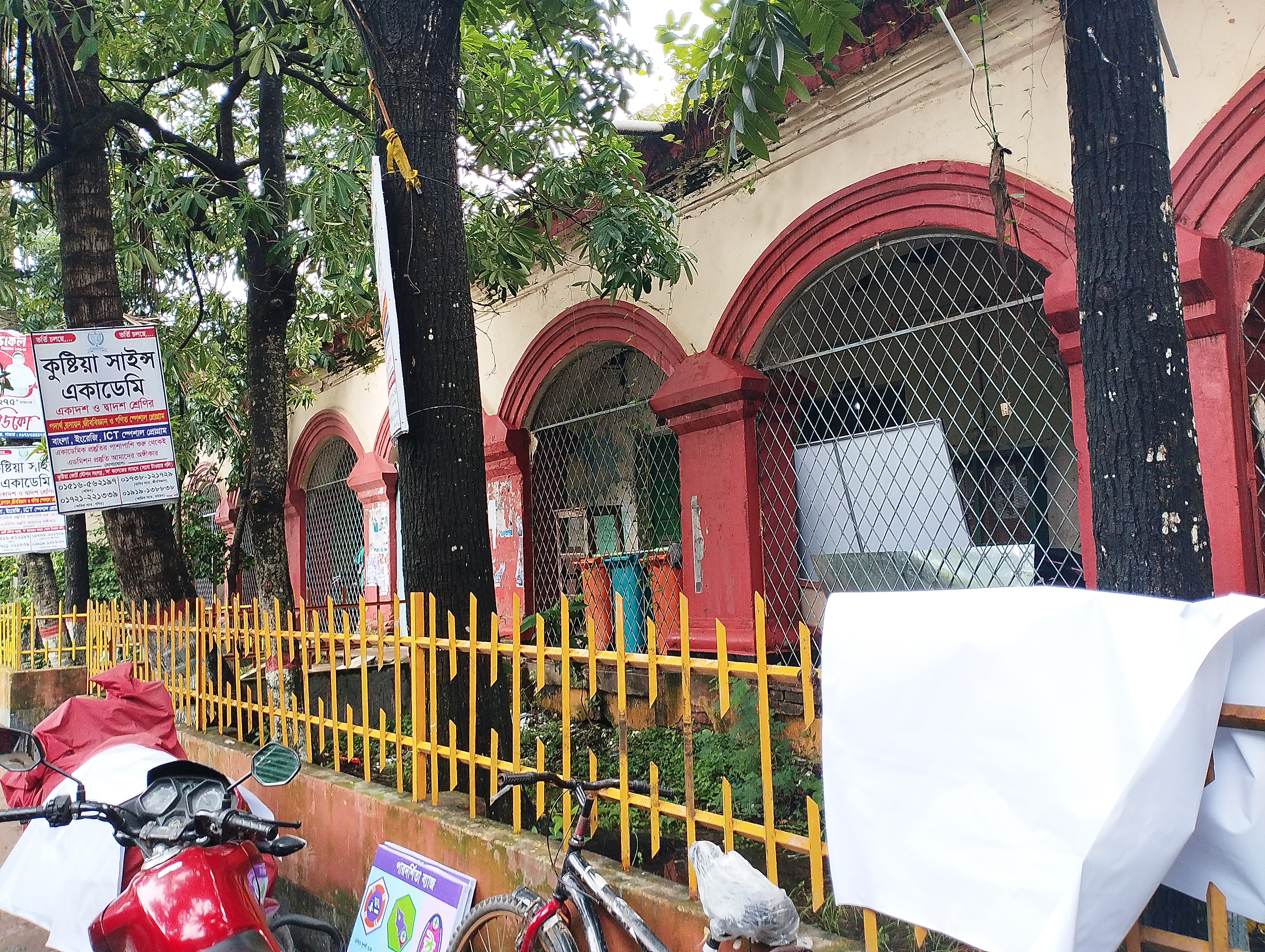
Principal's office, which was previously a part of the Kushtia Judge Court

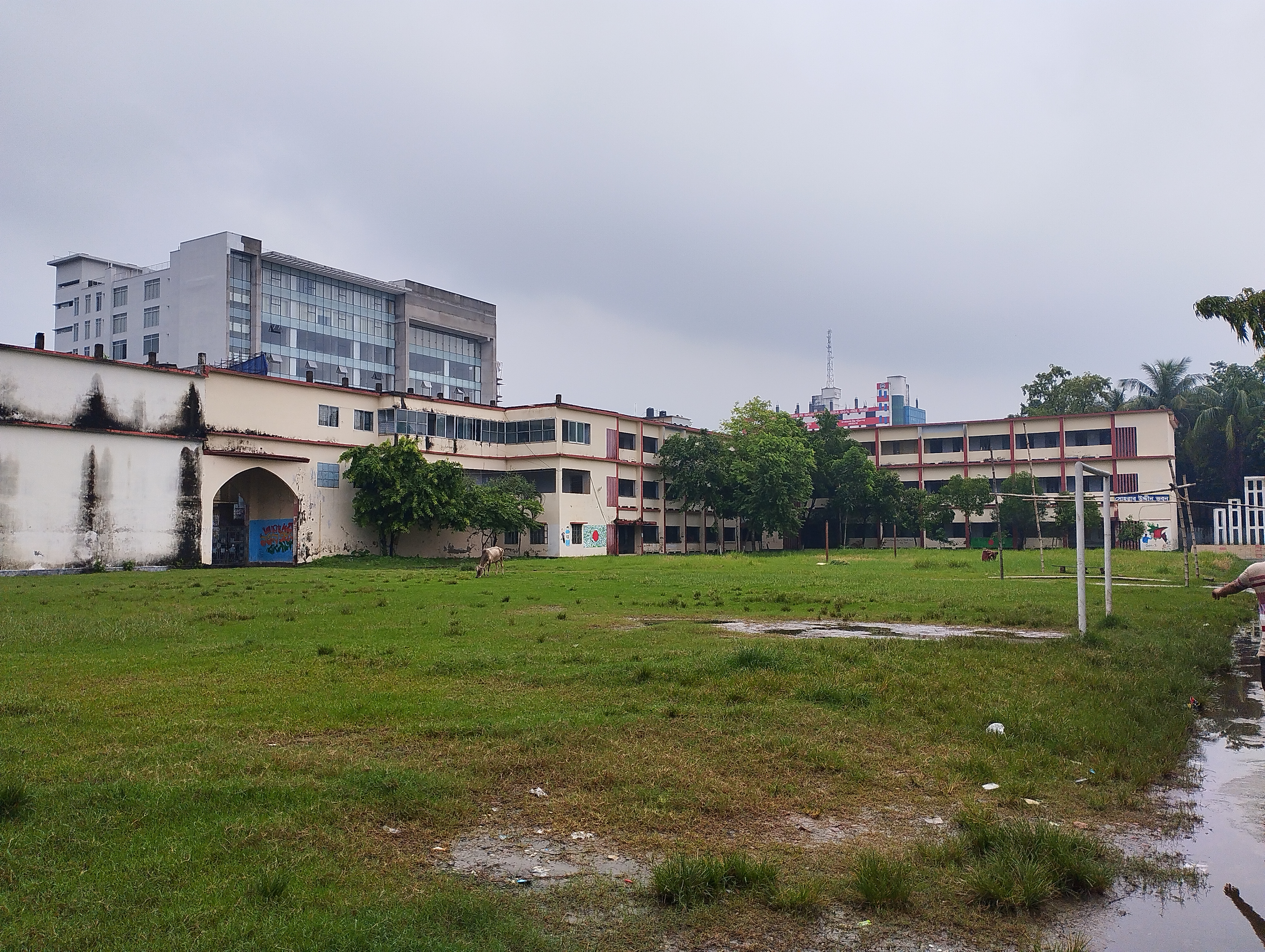
Interior view of the college and the tall building is the Kushtia District Council Supermarket

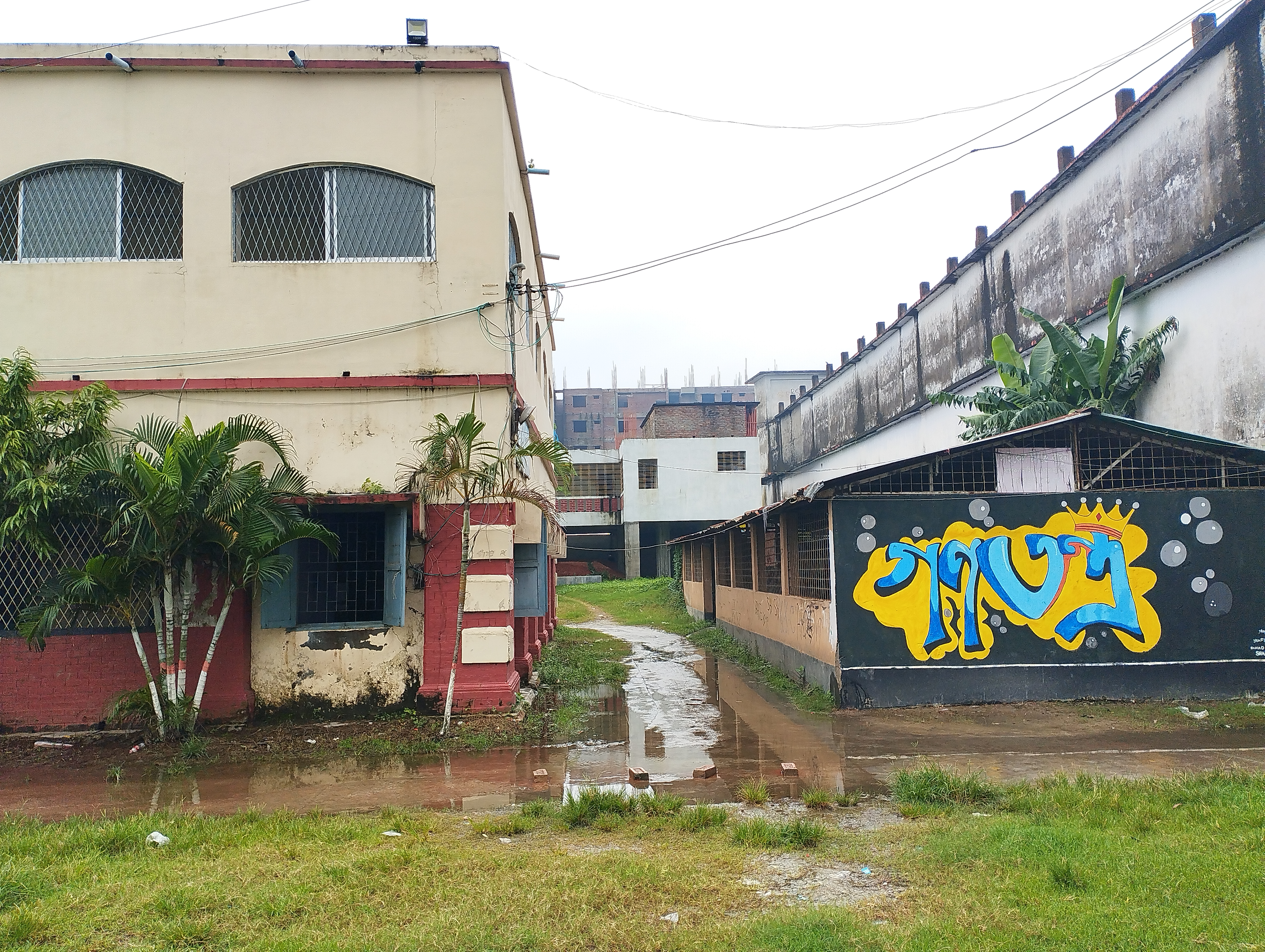
Rabindra Kala Bhaban and the college garage on the right

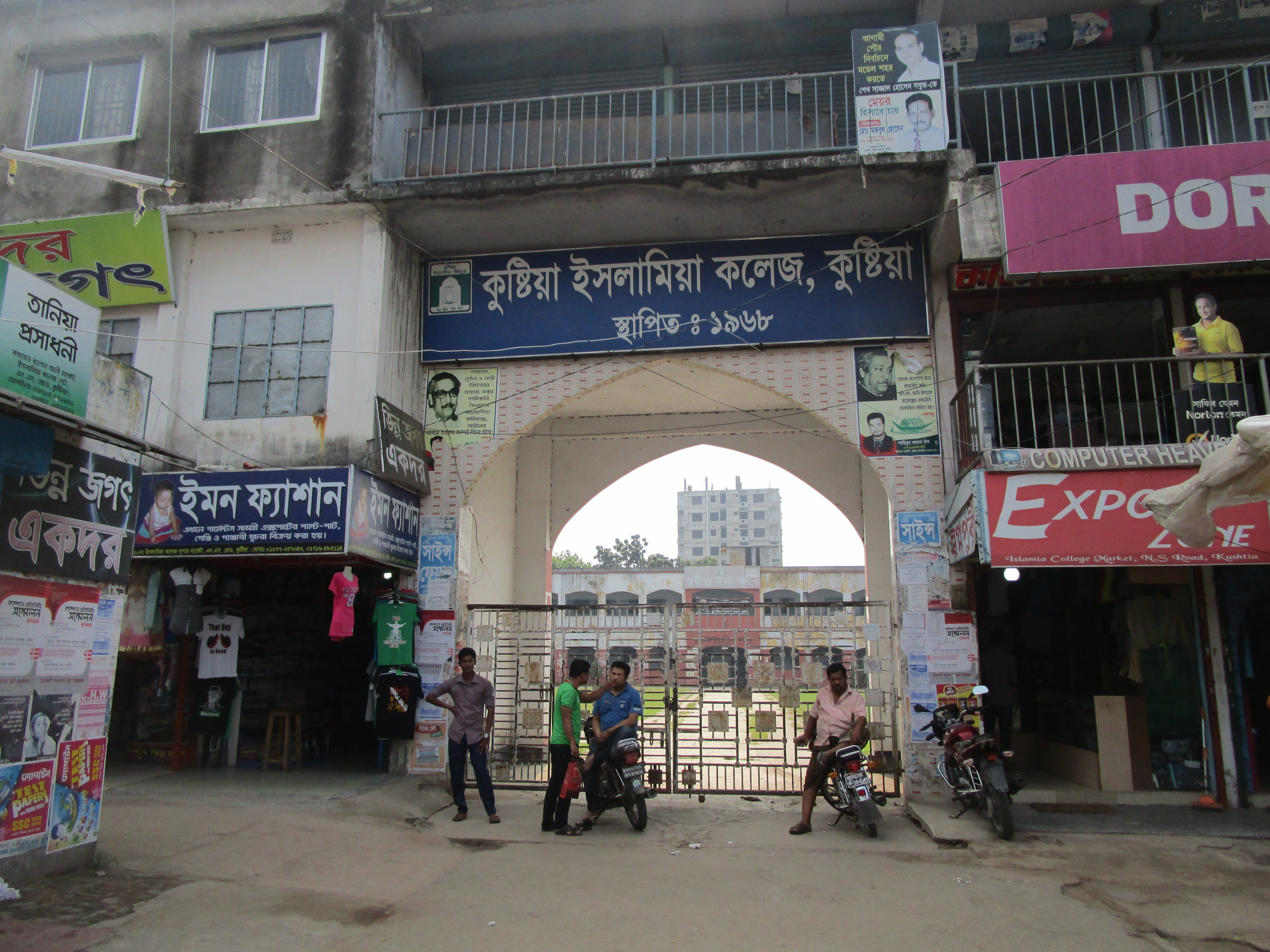
Gate No. 1

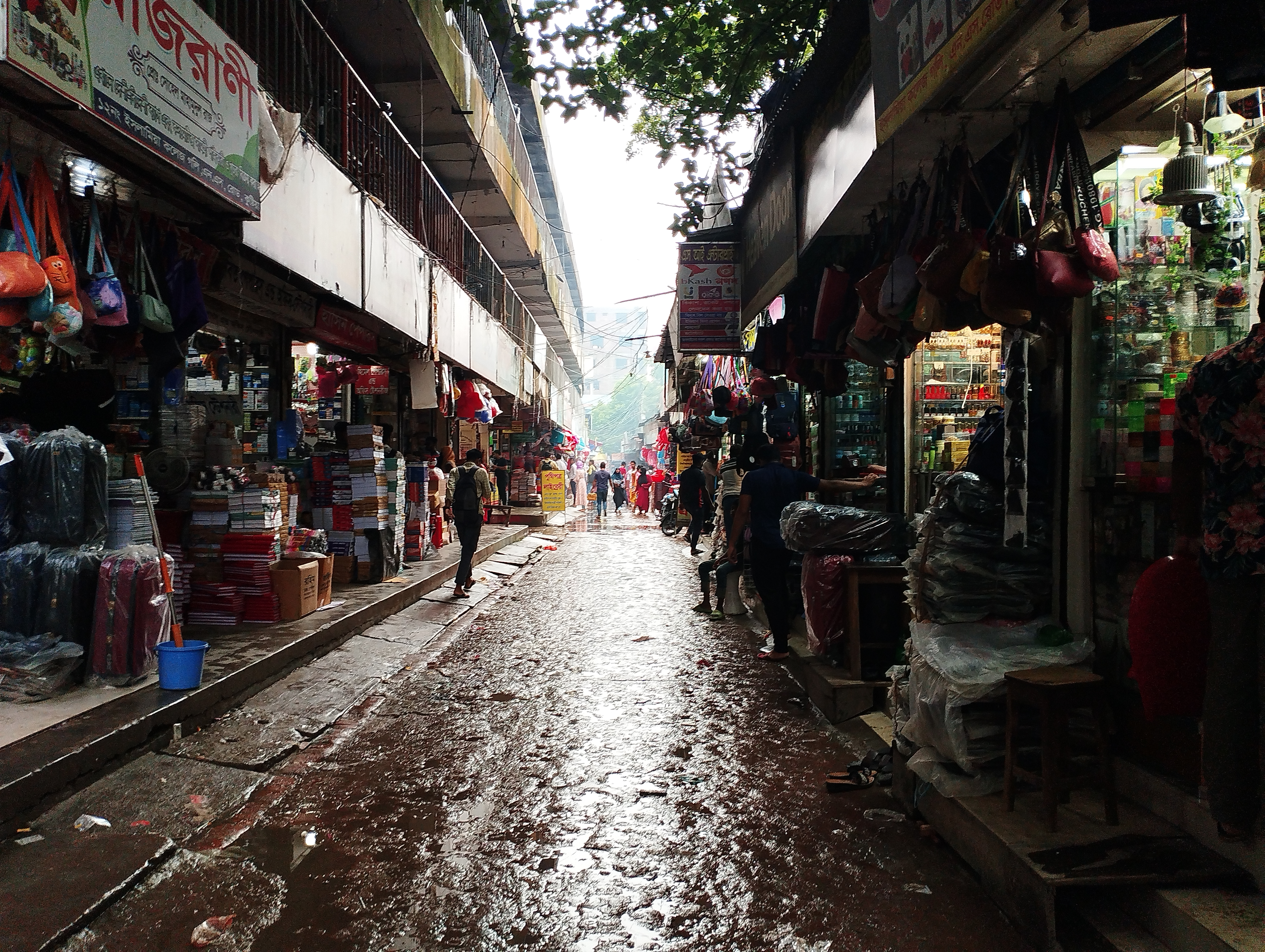
Islamia College Market

== External ==
- Media related to Kushtia Islamia College at Wikimedia Commons
