= Haripur Bridge =

Horipur Bridge
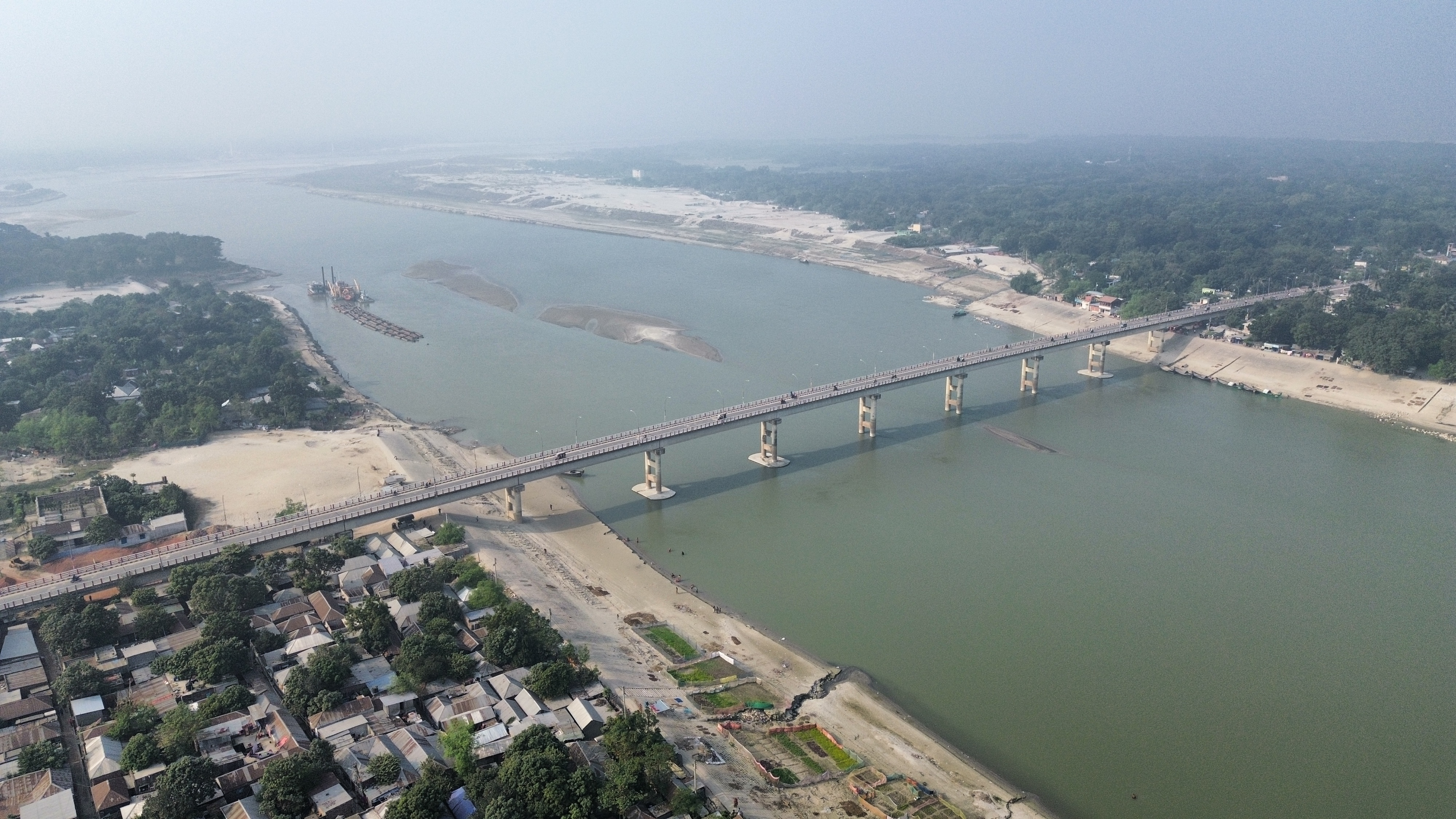
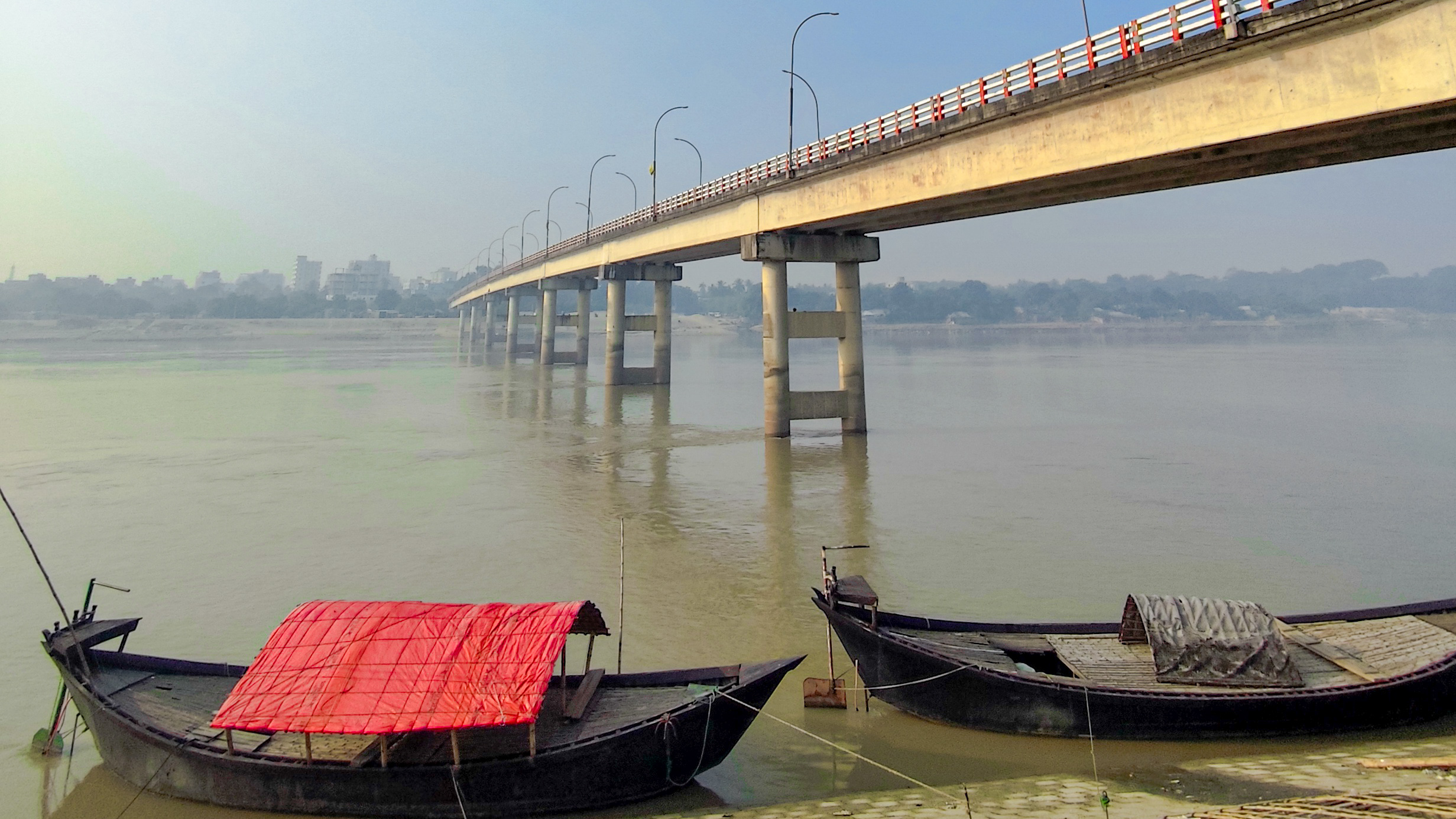
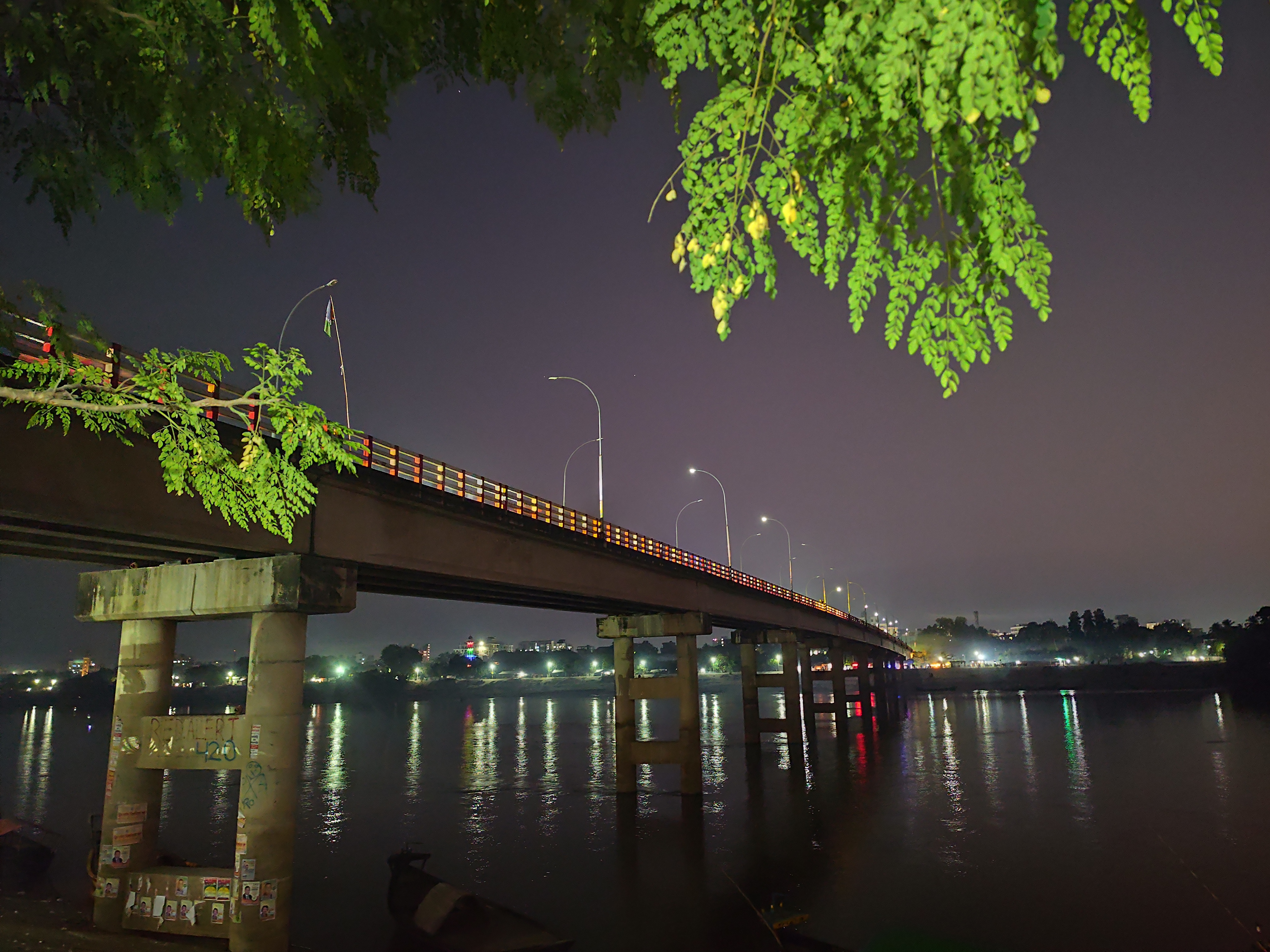
- Drone view of the bridge The bridge at dawn The bridge at night
- Coordinates: 23.9156817°N 89.1295605°E
- Carries: Vehicle
- Crosses: Gorai river
- Locale: Horipur Road, Kushtia
- Begins: Choy Rastar Moree
- Ends: Horipur
- Maintained by: Roads and Highways Department, Kushtia

Characteristics
- Material: Concrete, steel
- Total length: 604 metres (0.604 km)
- Width: 6.1 m
- No. of lanes: 2

History
- Constructed by: Mir Akhtar Associate
- Construction start: December 22, 2013; 12 years ago
- Construction cost: 71 crore 1 lakh 55 thousand 632 taka
- Opened: April 24, 2017; 9 years ago

Statistics
- Toll: no

Location
- Interactive map of Horipur Bridge

Haripur Bridge (Bengali: হরিপুর সেতু; formerly known as Sheikh Russel Bridge) is a road bridge built over Gorai River in Kushtia town of Kushtia District. Construction of the bridge began in 2013 and the bridge was opened to the public in 2017.

== History ==
This bridge was a long-standing demand of the people of Hatsh Haripur Union. Joint General Secretary of Bangladesh Awami League, Member of National Parliament of Kushtia-3 Constituency Mahabubul Alam Hanif promised to build this bridge by giving importance to the demands of the people of Haripur Union.

On December 22, 2013, under the supervision of LGED, Kushtia, the contracting firm Mir Akhtar Associates received the work order for the construction of the bridge. On March 24, 2017, Minister of Local Government, Rural Development and Cooperatives Khandkar Mosharraf Hossain inaugurated the bridge.

== Nomenclature ==
The bridge was named after Sheikh Russell, the youngest son of Bangabandhu Sheikh Mujibur Rahman.

However, the bridge is better known as Haripur Bridge in the entire Kushtia District.

== Construction cost ==
71 crore 1 lakh 55 thousand 632 taka were spent to build the Haripur bridge over the Gorai river in Kushtia . 9 crore 92 lakh 49 thousand 233 taka were spent on river management along with the construction of bridges and 5 crore 28 lakh 32 thousand 147 taka were spent on the construction of the Apros road.

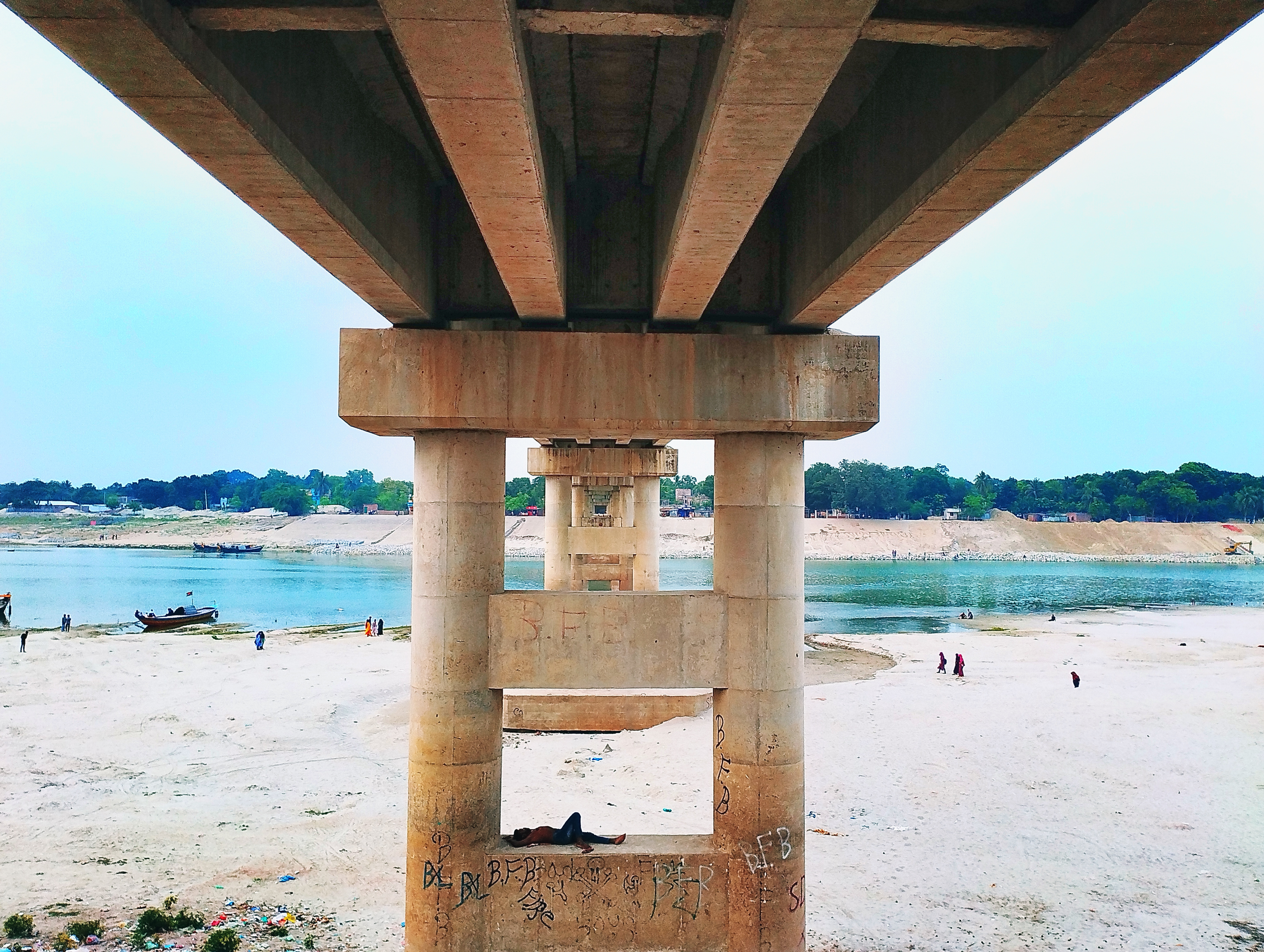
From under the span of the bridge

== Horipur town and the Bridge ==
=== Horipur ===
Haripur is an ancient town in Kushtia District. Haripur is known as Old Kushtia to the people of the district. There is also a city Haripur in KP Pakistan.

=== Importance of a Bridge ===
This Haripur has various ancient monuments and monuments of the British period. Kushtia has many Nilkuthis in Haripur.The population of Hatsh Haripur Union of Kushtia Sadar Upazila of Kushtia District is about lakhs. The Gorai River bisects Kushtia city and the Haripur region. Most of the grocers in Kushtia town come from Haripur. When the bridge was not there, the people of Haripur used to travel to Kushtia town by boat crossing through the Ghorar Ghat. At present the bridge is economically important for Kushtia.

== Gallery ==
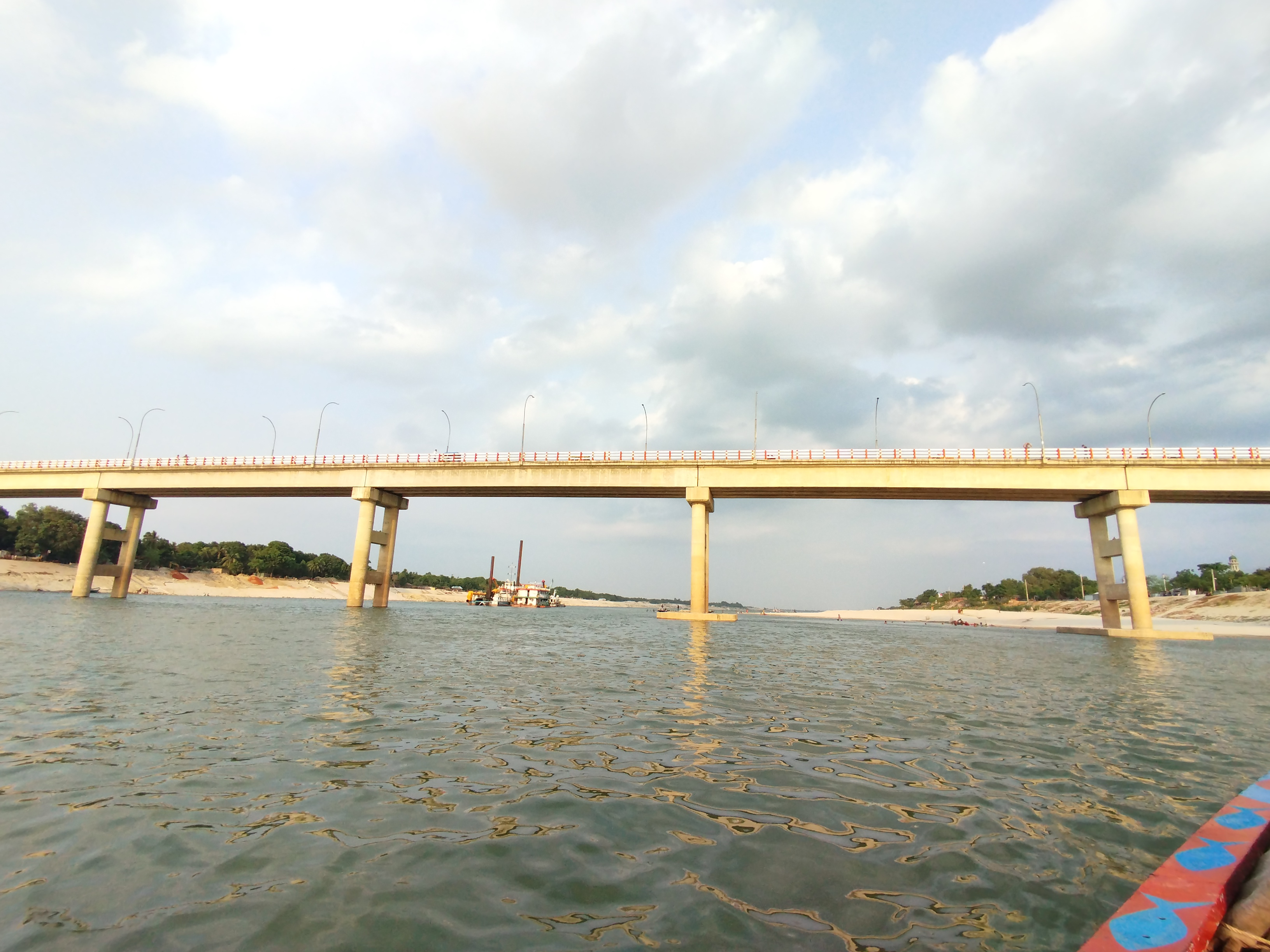

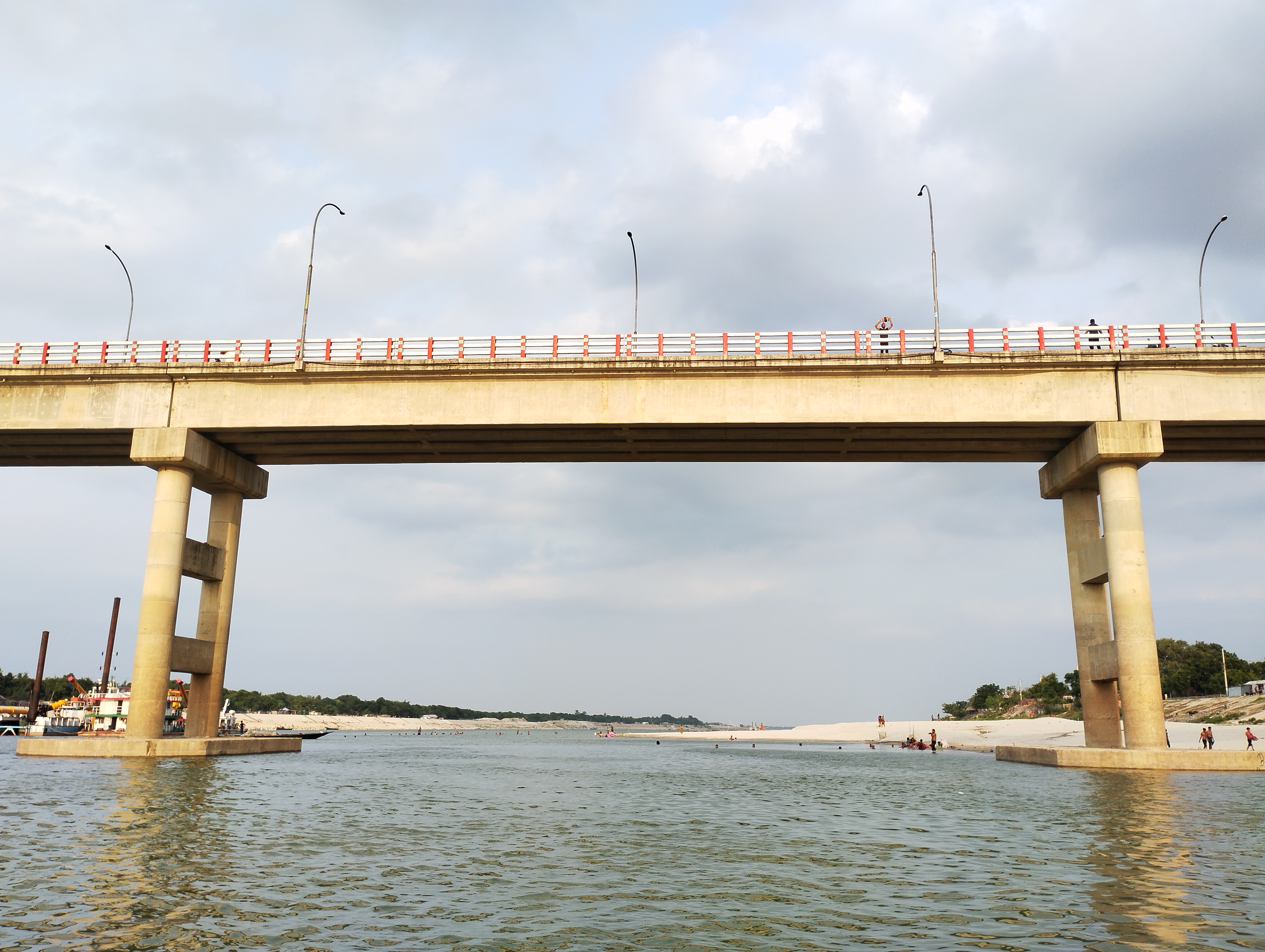

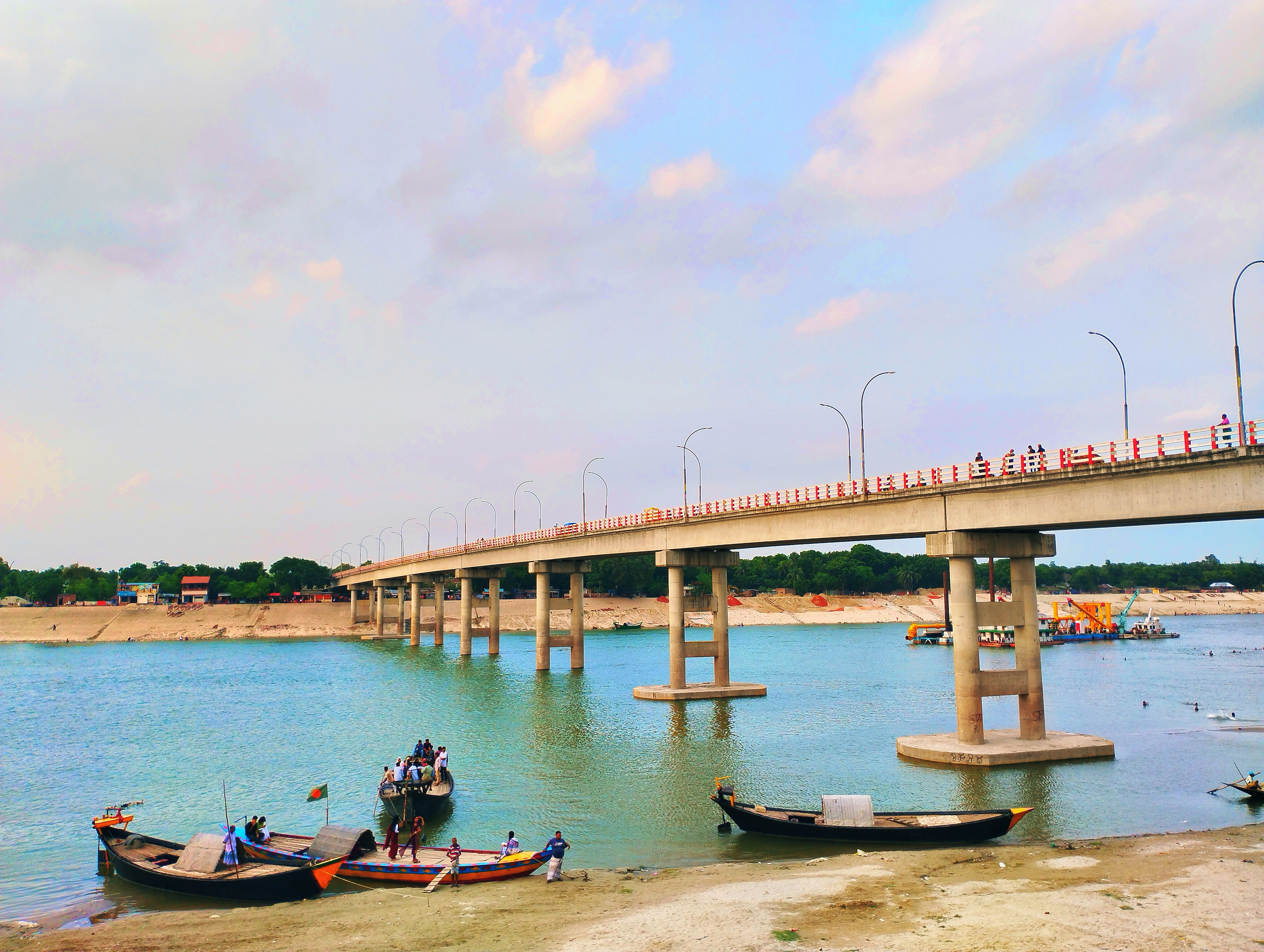

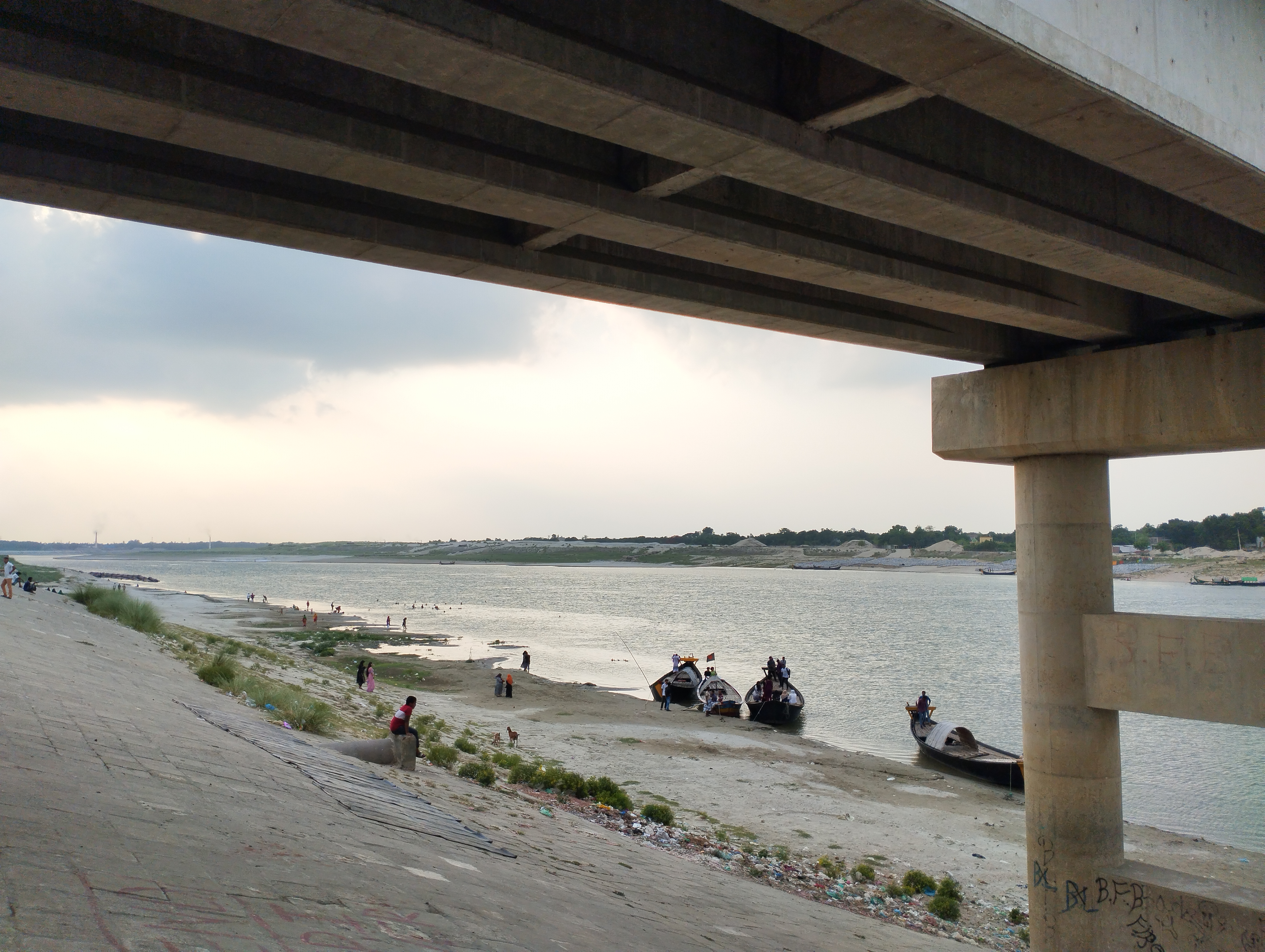

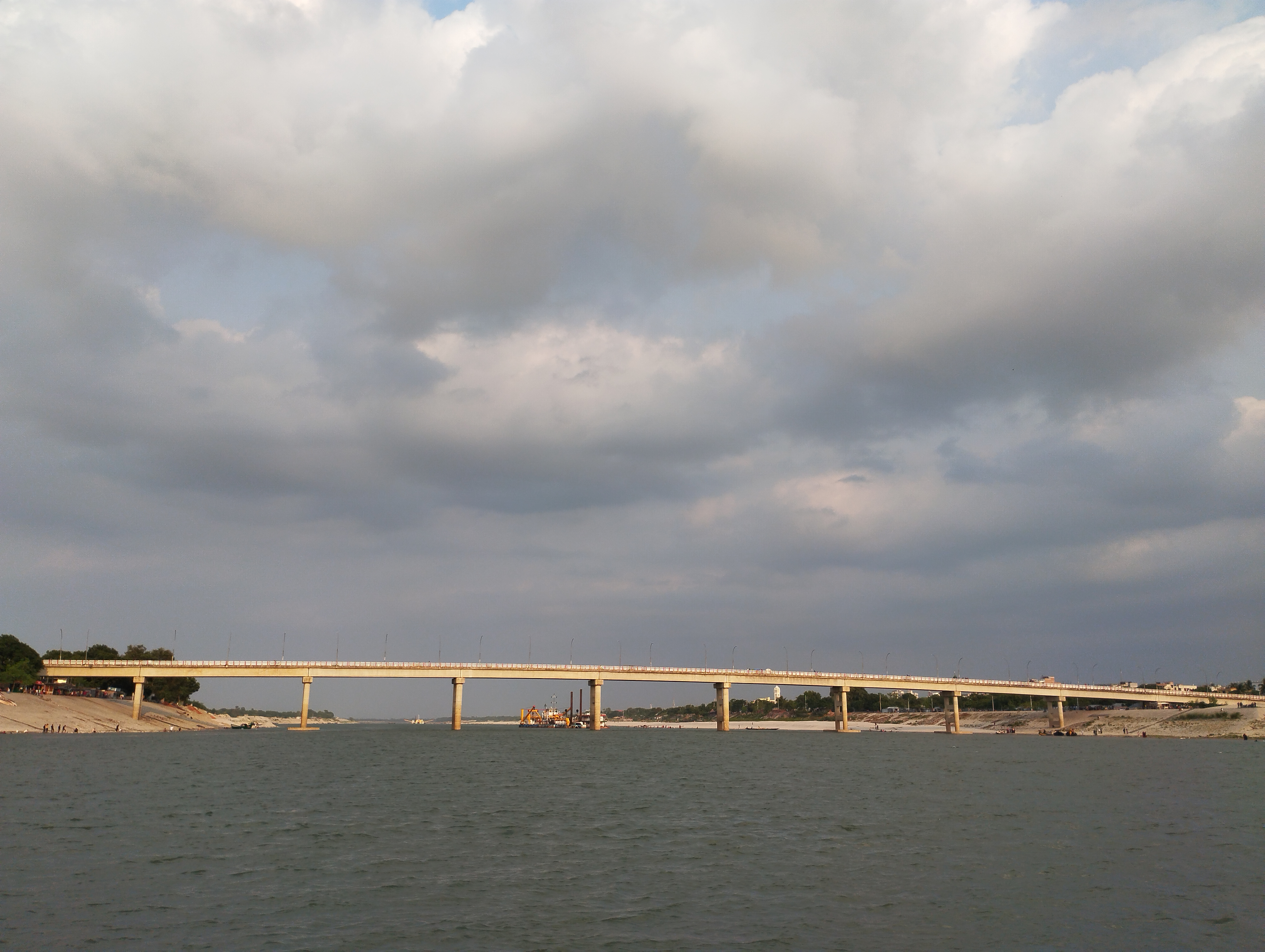

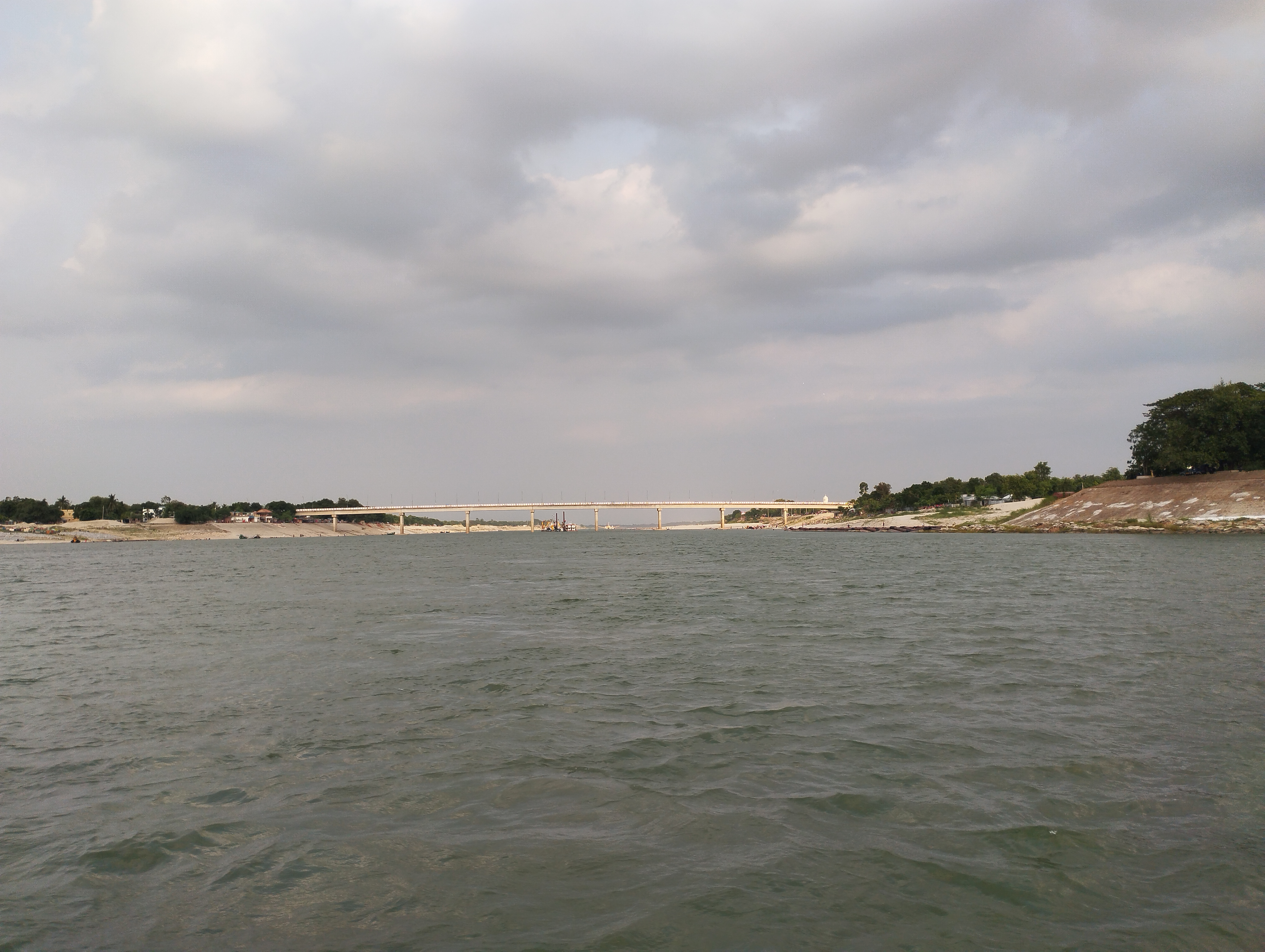

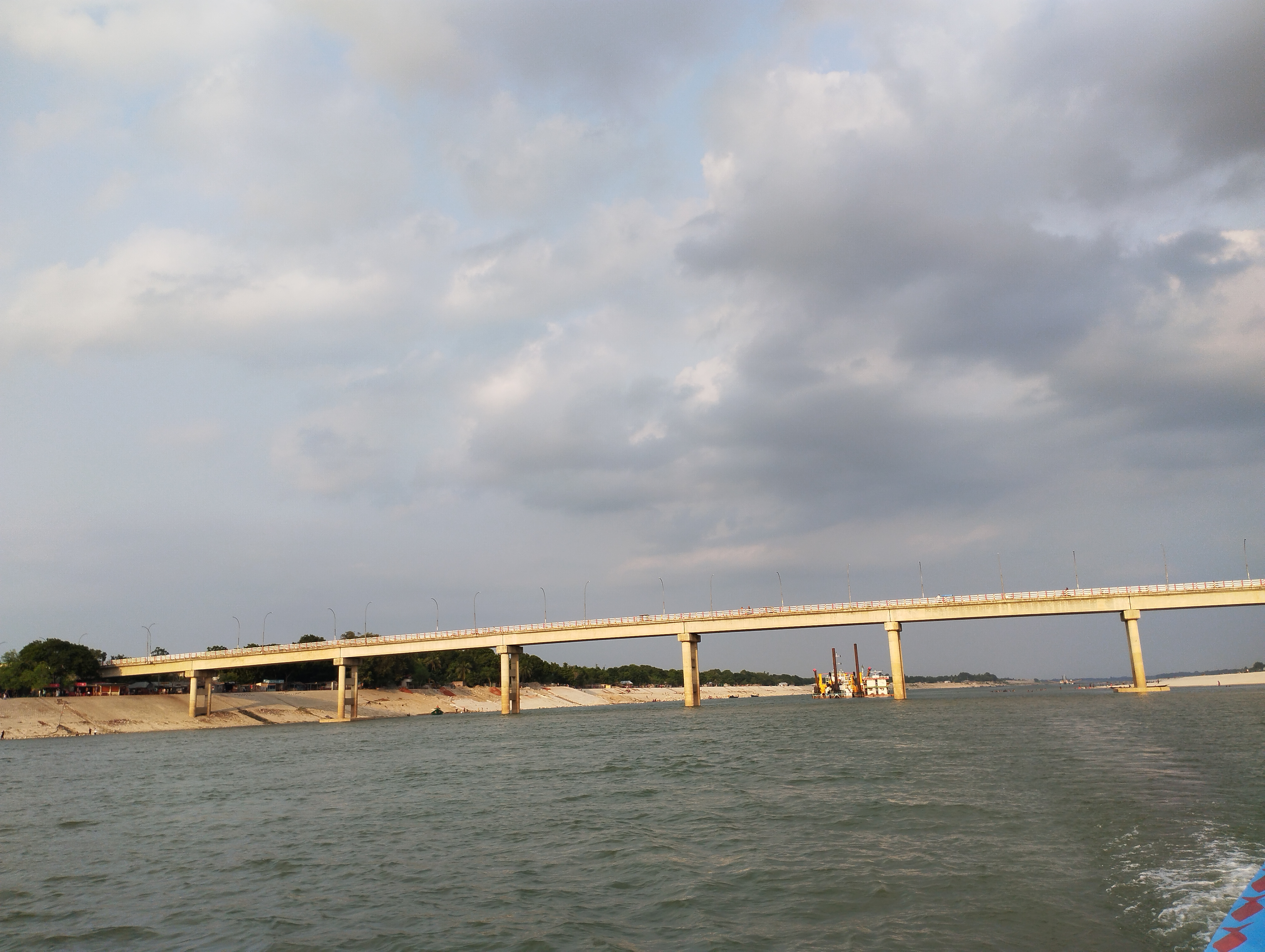
