= Kushtia Central Jame Masjid =

Mosque in Kushtia, Bangladesh

Kushtia Central Jame Masjid (Kushtia Boro Jame Masjid)
- কুষ্টিয়া কেন্দ্রীয় জামে মসজিদ (কুষ্টিয়া বড় জামে মসজিদ)
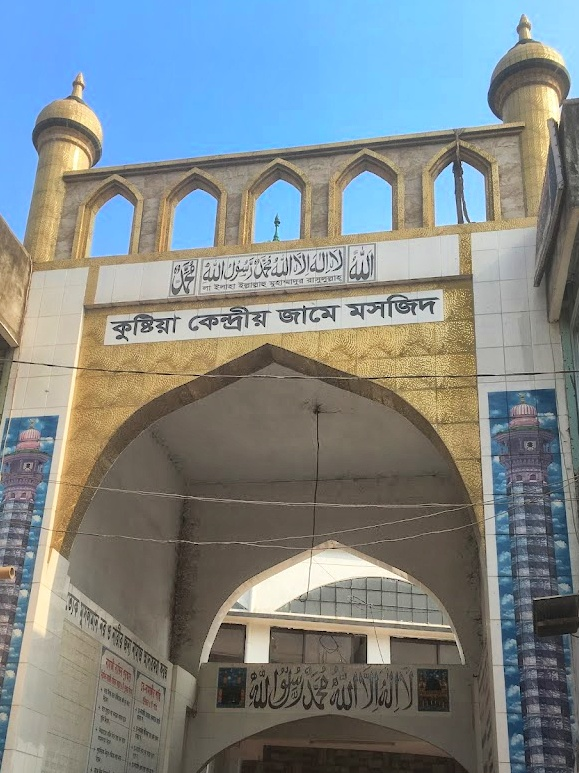
- The main entrance of the mosque

- Location of the mosque in Bangladesh

Religion
- Affiliation: Islam
- Ecclesiastical or organizational status: Friday mosque
- Status: Active

Location
- Location: NS Road, Thanapara, Kushtia, Kushtia, Khulna Division
- Country: Bangladesh
- Interactive map of Kushtia Central Jame Masjid (Kushtia Boro Jame Masjid)
- Coordinates: 23°54′30″N 89°07′47″E

Architecture
- Founder: Zamindar Ataul Haque
- Completed: 1896

Specifications
- Minaret: One
- Minaret height: 34 m (111 ft)

Kushtia Central Jame Masjid (Bengali: কুষ্টিয়া কেন্দ্রীয় জামে মসজিদ), also known as Kushtia Boro Jame Masjid, is a Friday mosque located in Kushtia city, Kushtia District, in the Khulna Division of Bangladesh. Established in 1896, the mosque became the central mosque of Kushtia.

== History ==
A thatched house was built in 1890 for the maulbi of the Kushtia High School on the site of the present mosque. In 1896, zamindar of Sheikhpara (Note: Sheikhpara is an area near Islamic University. It is located in Shailkupa Upazila of Jhenaidah District.) became the owner of this land through Awaz and built the mosque here. At that time the length and width of the mosque were 7.3 metres (24 ft).

Due to the increasing number of worshippers, the size of the mosque was increased in 1926. In 1986, the south side was extended. The mosque building has two floors and a huge shaped minaret, that is 34 metres (111 ft) tall. Construction of the minaret began in 2021.

== Gallery ==
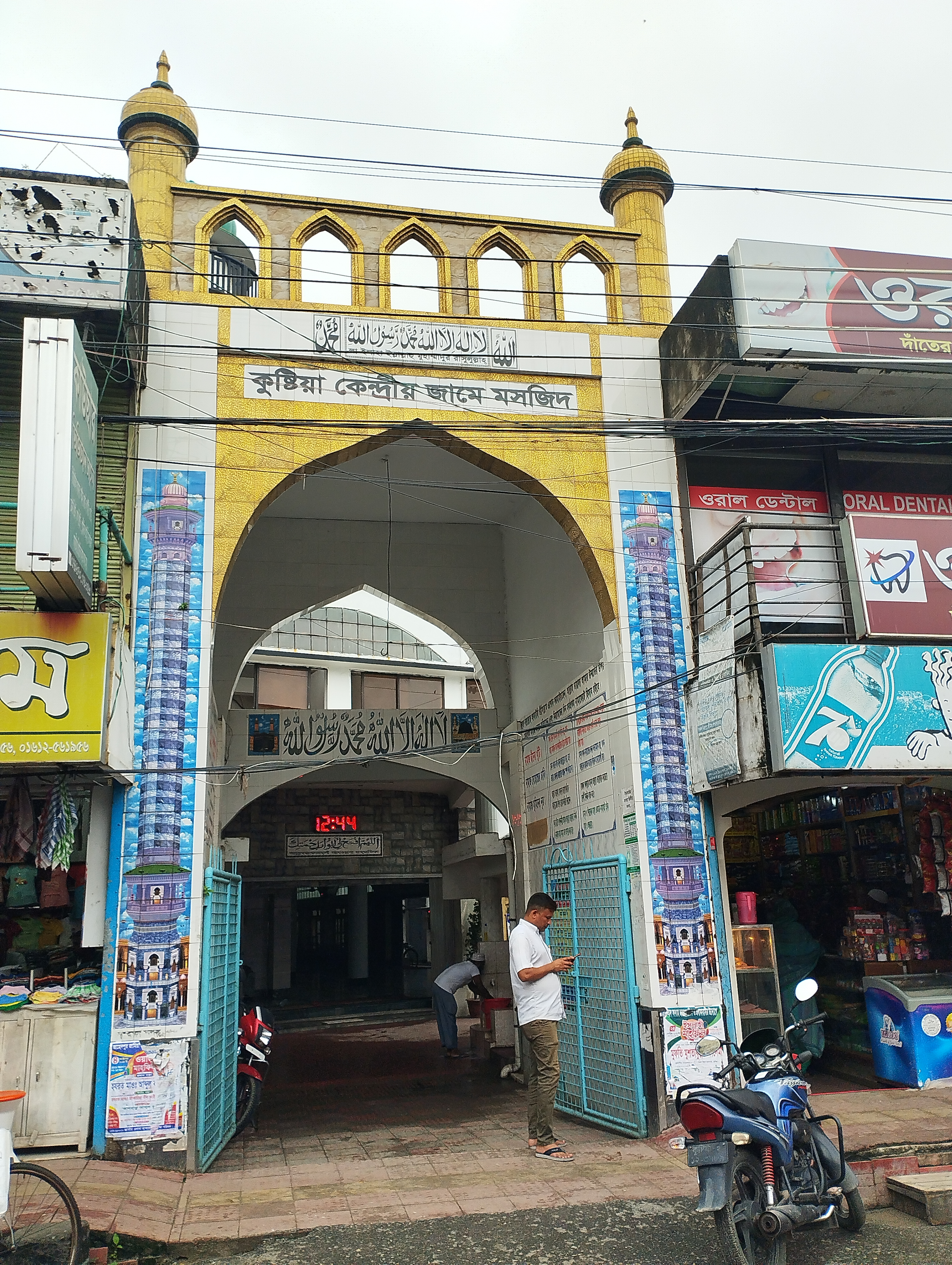
The entrance of mosque

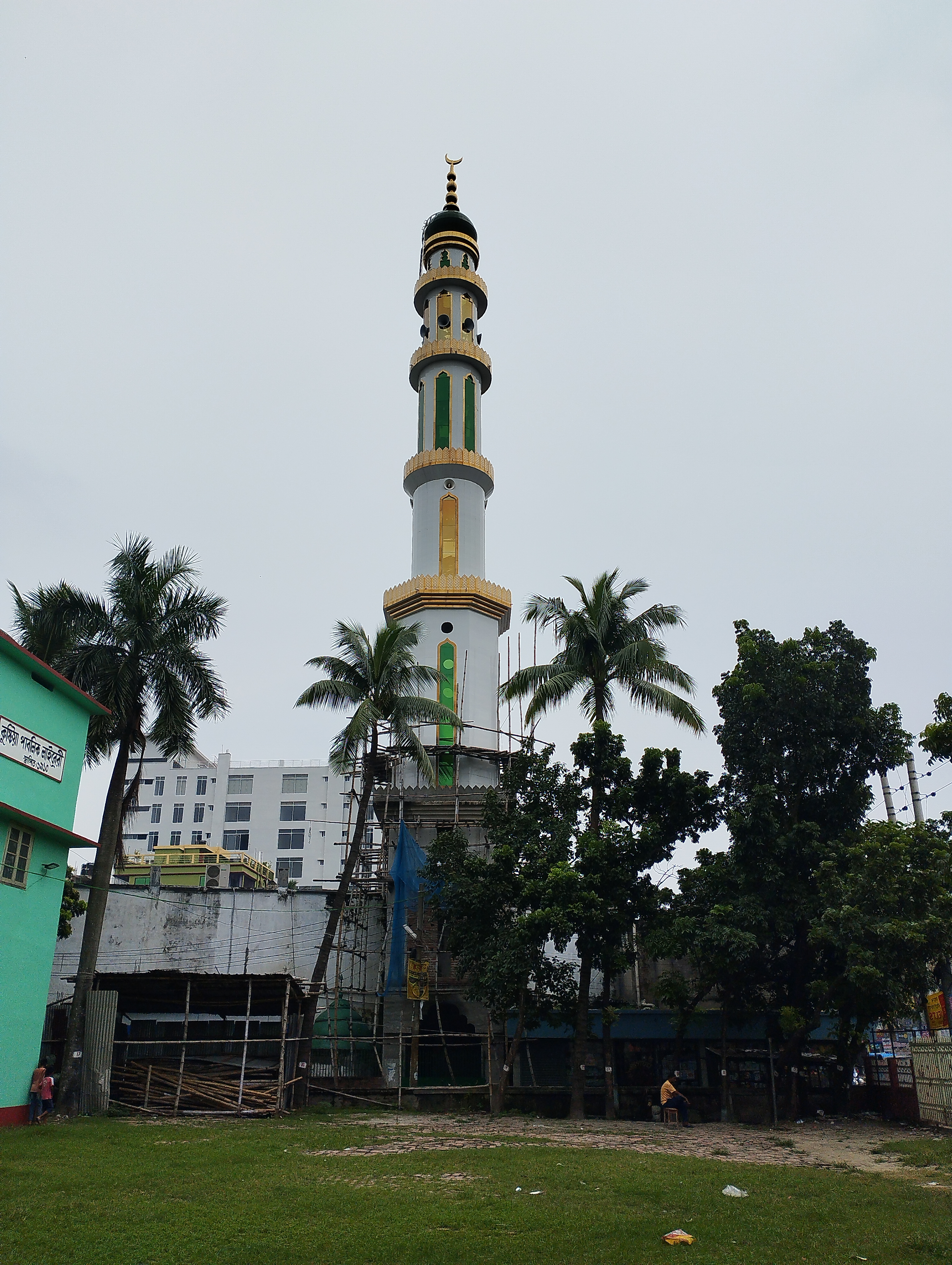
The minaret from the grounds of Kushtia Public Library

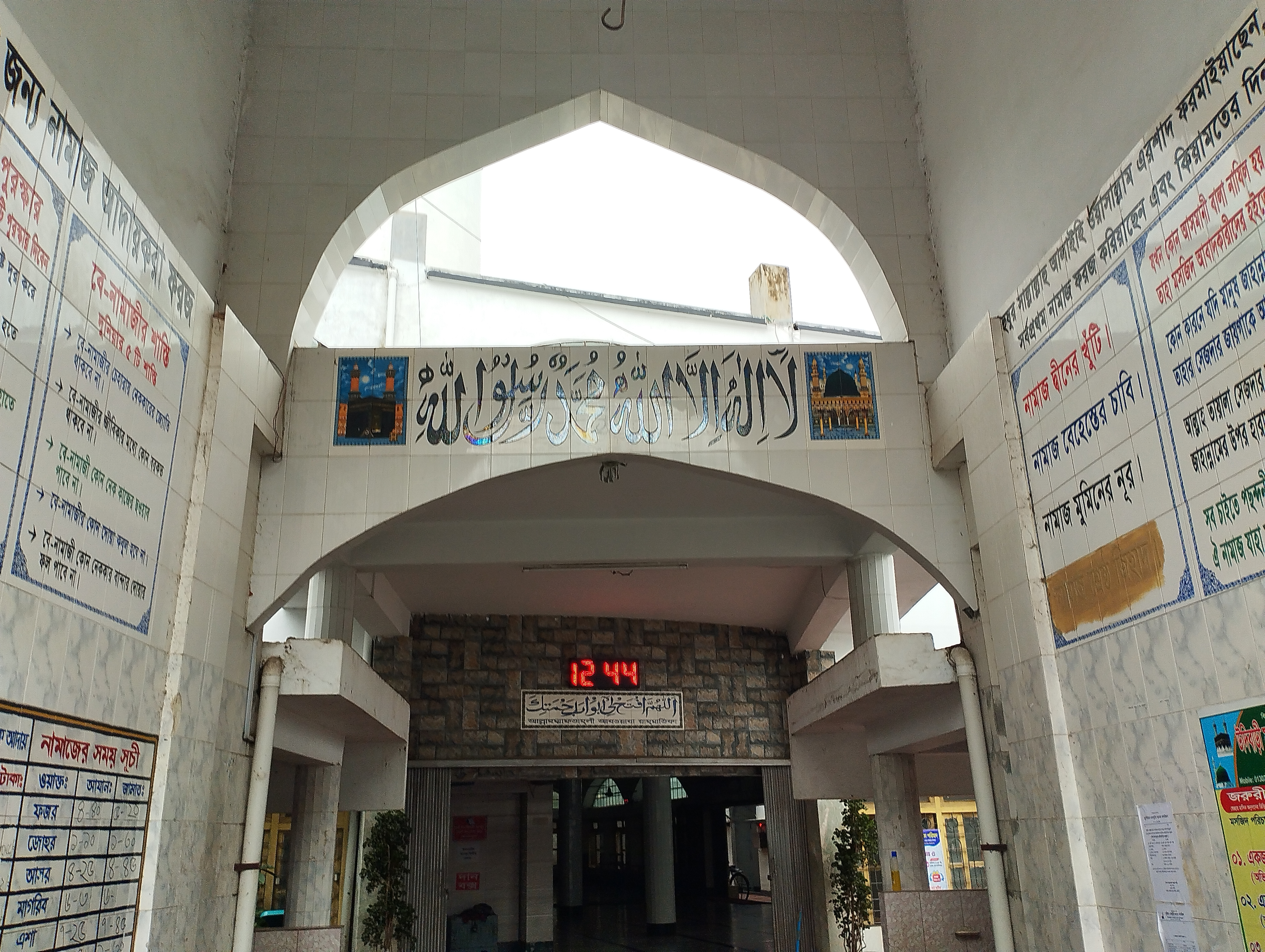
Scene after entering through the entrance

== See also ==
- Islam in Bangladesh
- List of mosques in Bangladesh
