= Hatsh Haripur Union =

Hatosh Horipur Union হাটশ হরিপুর ইউনিয়ন
- Union
- Location within Bangladesh
- Coordinates: 23.9315°N 89.1244°E
- Country: Bangladesh
- Division: Khulna
- District: Kushtia
- Upazila: Kushtia Sadar

Area
  - Total: 51.80 km^{2} (20.00 sq mi)

Population (2011)
  - Total: 42,575
  - Density: 821.9/km^{2} (2,129/sq mi)
- Time zone: UTC+6 (BST)
- Website: 1nohatashharipurup.kushtia.gov.bd

Hatosh Horipur Union (Bengali: হাটশ হরিপুর ইউনিয়ন) is a union parishad situated at Kushtia Sadar Upazila, in Kushtia District, Khulna Division of Bangladesh. The union has an area of 51.80 square kilometres (20.00 sq mi) and as of 2001 had a population of 42,575. There are 11 villages and 9 mouzas in the union.
