= Kushtia Public Library =

Historic building, Bangladesh

Kushtia Public Library Building
- কুষ্টিয়া পাবলিক লাইব্রেরি ভবন
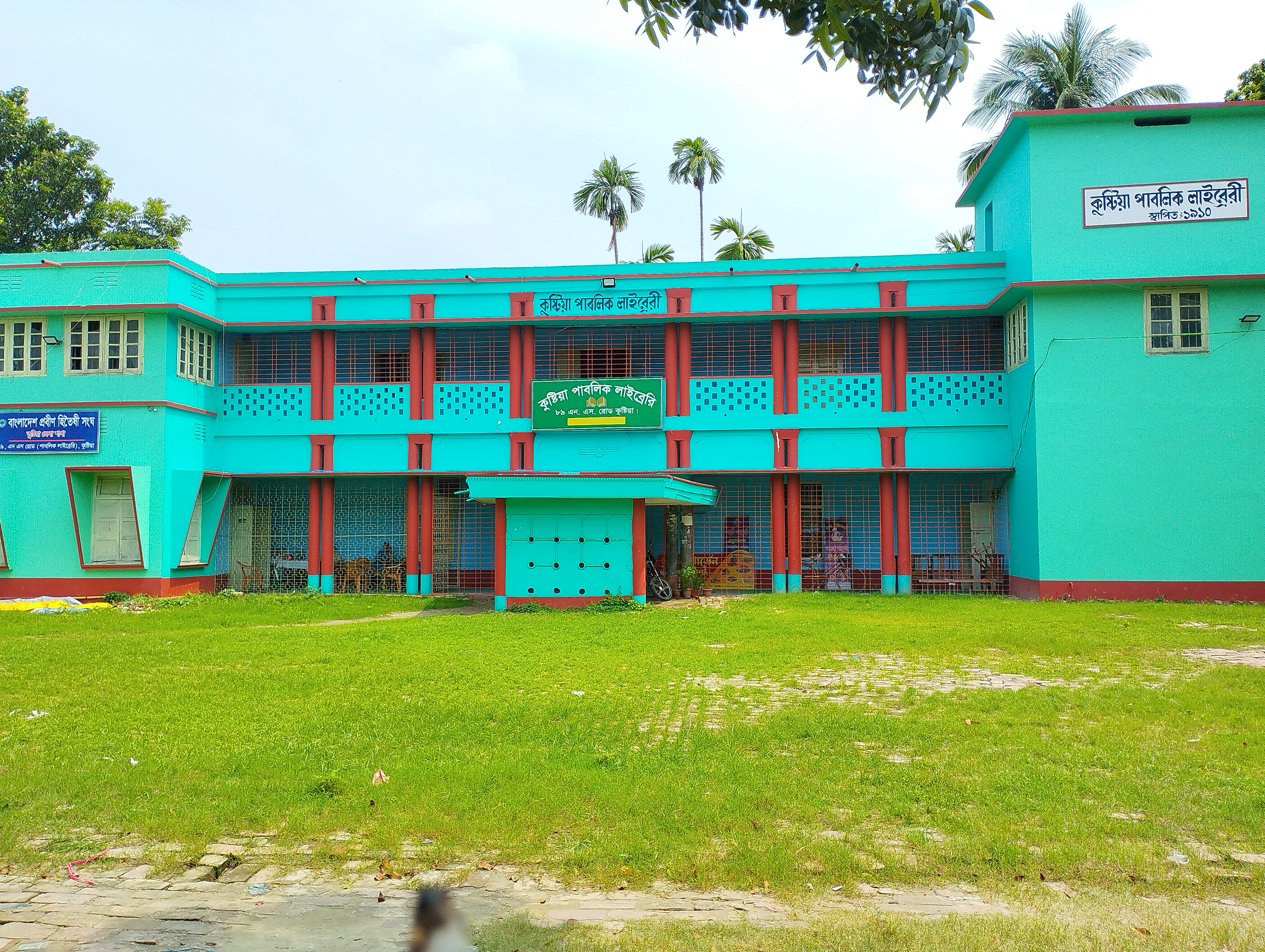

General information
- Architectural style: British architecture
- Location: Thanapara
- Town or city: Kushtia
- Country: Bangladesh
- Opened: 1910; 115 years ago
- Renovated: Renovation 1965; 60 years ago; double storey 1985; 40 years ago; Renovation 2024

Technical details
- Floor count: 2

Kushtia Public Library (Bengali: কুষ্টিয়া পাবলিক লাইব্রেরি) is one of the oldest libraries in Kushtia district of Bangladesh. The library was established in 1910 by prominent landlords and individuals of Kushtia.

== History ==
In 1910, with the encouragement of Krishnadayal Pramanik, the then administrator of Kushtia Sub-division of Nadia district, Gourishankar Aggarwal donated 10 khata of land on Nawab Sirajuddaula Road (NS Road) of Kushtia city to establish a library . Harishchandra Roy, the zamindar of Garchadi, built the library building.

The library suffered considerable damage during the World War I and World War II and the Bangladesh Liberation War . Due to the partition of Indian many patrons of the library migrated to India . As a result, the library almost stopped working. The library was closed from 1947 to 1952. The library suffers the most from its relocation. The library building was occupied on a temporary basis due to government requirements and the library was shifted to the Kushtia Sub-Divisional Office. Important documents related to land ownership were lost during the transfer of the library. Some of the land of the library was taken by the Pakistan Government during the construction of Dak Bungalow.

== Current status ==
Currently the number of books in the library is more than 25,000. A library management council has been managing all the activities of the library since its inception. At present there are 05 employees to carry out the day-to-day functions of the library and the number of readers has decreased significantly. The library is being operated only on the ground floor of the library building. The second floor is rented out to another organization. At present, various fairs are organized in the field in front of the library.

== Library building ==
In 1910, the zamindar of Garchadi, Harishchandra Roy Chowdhury, built the library building. Both storeys of the building have front porches and twin round pillars. Currently the total land area is 0.3987 acres (1,613 m^{2}).

== Bibliography ==
- Md. Rezaul Karim (December 2022). কুষ্টিয়ার প্রত্ননিদর্শন [Archeology of Kushtia] (in Bengali). Dhaka: Gatidhara. pp. 116–118. ISBN 978-984-8950-41-8.
