= Khajanagar =

- Suburbs of Kushtia
- Location of Khajanagar in Bangladesh
- Coordinates: 23.867878°N 89.062201°E
- Country: Bangladesh
- Division: Khulna
- District: Kushtia
- Upazila: Kushtia Sadar
- Union: Battail

Population (2011)
  - Total: 13,452

Khajanagar is a neighborhood located in the southwestern part of Kushtia city. It is the second-largest rice wholesale market (mukam) in Bangladesh. According to a 2019 report by Prothom Alo about 30% of the country's rice supply is produced in Khajanagar.

Prior to 1972 the area now known for its rice mills was referred to as the 'Khajanagar Field' with only three families living in scattered settlements. Due to the fertile soil, various crops like paddy, jute, and wheat were cultivated there. Until 1975 no rice mills existed in the area. In mid-1976 the first rice mill named 'Khajanagar Rice Mill' was established. The owner of this mill hailed from Chilmari Union under Daulatpur Thana in Kushtia District.

Chilmari Union is located right along the banks of the Padma River. Since 1971 the area experienced severe river erosion causing part of the union to be engulfed by the river. Anticipating future displacement some affluent residents of Chilmari purchased land in Khajanagar Field which was located about 50 kilometers away. At the time land prices in Khajanagar were very low. This initiated a migration of Chilmari residents to the area. By 1972–1973 many people from Chilmari had moved to Khajanagar and settled there based on their financial ability. Over time the field transformed into a densely populated residential and commercial area.

== Location ==
Khajanagar is located between Battail and Poradaha, and it falls under wards 8 and 9 of Bottail Union. It is approximately 6 kilometres (3.7 mi) from Chourhas Mor in Kushtia city. From the Battail intersection on the Kushtia–Jhenaidah Highway, the Kushtia–Chuadanga Regional Highway runs westward. The rice wholesale markets are situated along both sides of this regional highway.
