= N713 (Bangladesh) =

Highway of Bangladesh

National Highway 713 Kushtia City Bypass Road Kushtia Bypass Road
- জাতীয় মহাসড়ক ৭১৩ কুষ্টিয়া শহর বাইপাস সড়ক কুষ্টিয়া বাইপাস সড়ক
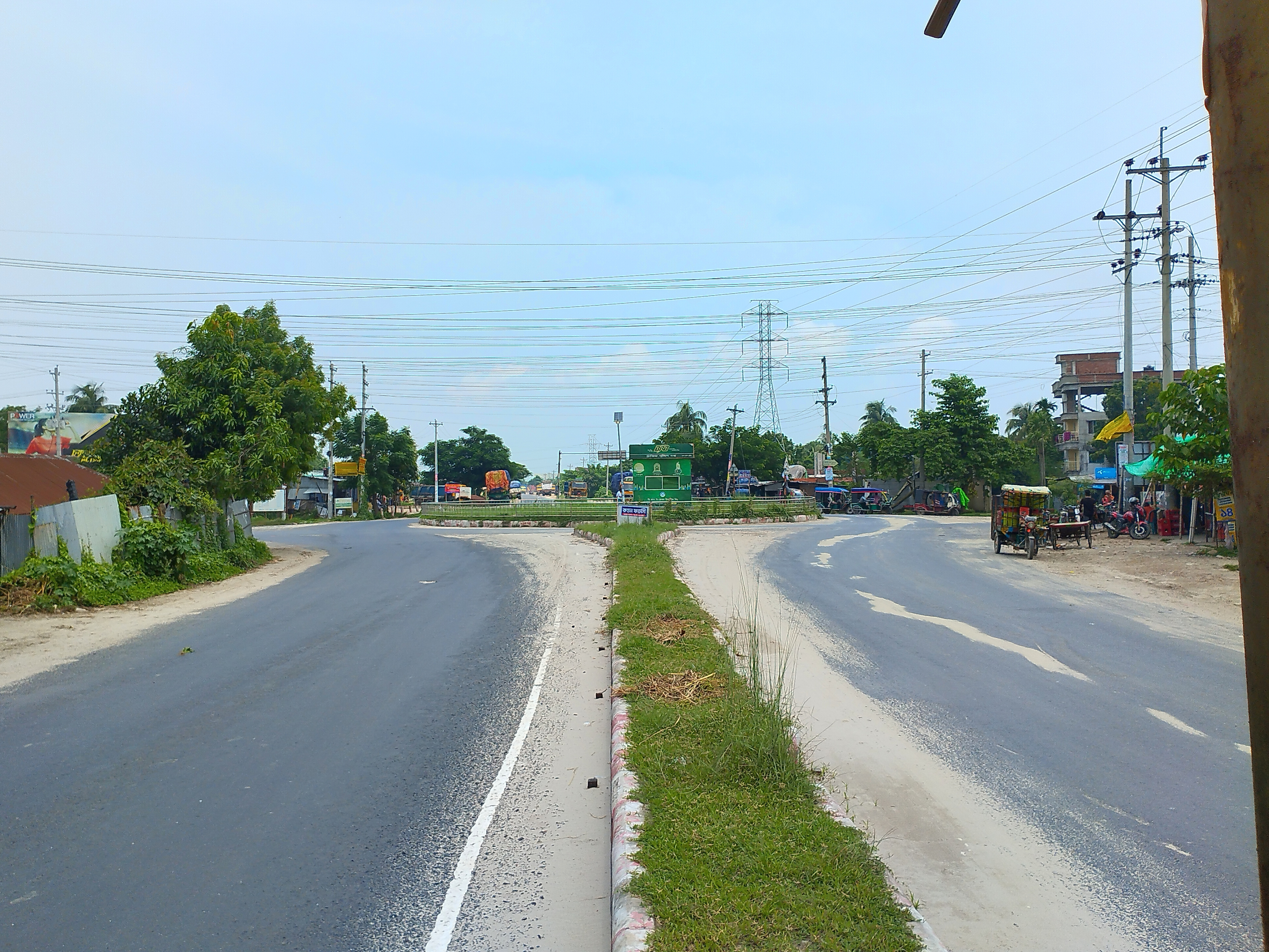
- The name of the place is Bypass Gol Chatwar, the left-right side road is R745 (Bangladesh)

Route information
- Length: 6.6 km (4.1 mi)

Major junctions
- North end: N704 (Bypass head turn)
- South end: N704 (Bottoil Turn)

Location
- Country: Bangladesh

Highway system
- Roads in Bangladesh
← N712	→ N714

Kushtia City Bypass Road (Bengali: কুষ্টিয়া শহর বাইপাস সড়ক) or N713 is a national highway and bypass road located next to Kushtia city in Bangladesh. Construction of the road began in 2016 and was inaugurated in 2018.

== Background ==
The construction of this bypass road started in 2005 but got stopped due to bureaucratic and land acquisition complications. In the 2007-2008 fiscal year, work resumed and stopped again. Later in 2016, the construction of the road started from January 28. 6.6 km long, 7.3 meter wide two-lane road has been constructed at a total cost of Tk 120 crore. A PC girder bridge, an underpass and 21 culverts have been constructed on this road. On November 31, 2018, the then Prime Minister Sheikh Hasina inaugurated the road.
