= N766 (Bangladesh) =

N766
- Satkhira Town Bypass Road

Route information
- Length: 12.35 km (7.67 mi)

Major junctions
- Binerpota end: Bypass Road Interchange
- N760 - Bypass Road Intersection; N765 - Labsha Roundabout; N715 - Medical College Intersection
- Satkhira Medical College end: Medical College Intersection

Location
- Country: Bangladesh

Highway system
- Roads in Bangladesh
← N765	→ N8

N766 or Satkhira Town Bypass Road is a national highway connecting three national highway bypassing Satkhira. It starts at bypass road Interchange and ends at Medical College Intersection.

== History ==
After integration of Bhomra Land Port in 1996, Citizen of Satkhira demanded to construct a bypass road. After growing influence about the demand. On 23 June 2010, then Prime Minister of Bangladesh Sheikh Hasina gave a speech in a rally at Shyamnagar upazila where she promised that constructed bypass road. In 2017 then Mp of Satkhira-2 constituency Mir Mostaque Ahmed Robi integrated work to construction of Bypass Road. On 26 June 2019, then Prime minister Sheikh Hasina opened the road in video conference.
