= National Highway 312 (India) =

National Highway in India

National Highway 312
- Map of National Highway 312 in red

Route information
- Auxiliary route of NH 12
- Length: 329 km (204 mi)

Major junctions
- North end: NH 12 in Jangipur, Murshidabad
- NH 112 in Bangaon
- South end: N715 in Bhomra-Gojardanga Border Crossing

Location
- Country: India
- States: West Bengal

Highway system
- Roads in India; Expressways; National; State; Asian
← NH 12	→ NH 312

National Highway 312, commonly referred to as NH 312 is a national highway in India. It is a secondary route of National Highway 12, which runs in the state of West Bengal in India.

== Route ==
The road connects

Murshidabad district

Jangipur, Omarpur, Lalgola, Bhagawangola, Murshidabad, Chunakhali, Islampur, Domkal, Jalangi

Nadia districts

Karimpur, Nazirpur,Betai, Debnathpur, Tehatta, Chapra, Krishnanagar,Dakshinpara,Hanshkhali, Bagula,Duttapulia

North 24 Parganas

Baneswarpur, Helencha, Bangaon, Berigopalpur Ghat, Ichamati, Tarnipur Ghat, Swarupnagar and Basirhat (Ghojadanga)

== Redevelopment ==
In 2022, National Highway Authority of India allocated ₹4,500 crore (US$480 million) to redevelop 318 km (198 mi) of the highway into 90 ft (27 m) wide 4 lanes. The highway was expected to be completed by 2024. However, land acquisition related issues at various places is causing the delay for the project by several years.

In February 2024, in reply to an RTI, NHAI informed that the DPR of this highway is yet to be completed and no indicative period for the commencement and completion of the project was informed.

== See also ==
- List of national highways in India
- List of national highways in India by state
