= N708 (Bangladesh) =

Road in Bangladesh

N708
- Jessore City Northern Bypass

Route information
- Length: 5 km (3.1 mi)

Major junctions
- Jessore end: Palbari intersection
- N7 / N707 - Palbari; N702 - New Market; N707 / N806 - Manihar
- Jessore end: Manihar

Location
- Country: Bangladesh

Highway system
- Roads in Bangladesh
← N707	→ N709

Jessore City Northern Bypass is a major national highway in Jessore city. This road makes the northern border of the city and also connect N702 and N806 without entering the city.
