= N711 (Bangladesh) =

National highway in Bangladesh

N711
- Benapole Town bypass road

Route information
- Part of AH1
- Length: 1 km (0.62 mi)

Major junctions
- From: N706 in Benapole town Gate
- To: NH 112 in Benapole Border Crossing

Location
- Country: Bangladesh

Highway system
- Roads in Bangladesh
← N710	→ N712

N711 or Benapole Town bypass road is a national highway. It starts from Benapole Town Gate and ends at Benapole Border Crossing where it meets NH 112 at no mans land.
