= Tanbazar =

Tanbazar টানবাজার পতিতালয়
- Brothel complex
- Location in Bangladesh
- Coordinates: 23.6130679°N 90.50263°E
- Country: Bangladesh
- City: Narayanganj

Tanbazar, or Tanbazaar (Bengali: টানবাজার পতিতালয়) was a 2,000-room brothel complex in Narayanganj, central Bangladesh. Until its closure in 1999, it was the largest brothel in the country, with 3,500 prostitutes working there.

== History ==
The brothel was set up in 1888 during British rule. At the time, Narayanganj was one of the biggest duty-free ports in Asia. The British who settled there coerced women from villages to provide entertainment for them. Later these women were discarded and socially boycotted. The women gathered in Tanbazar and the brothel became established.

A girl of 14, Shab Meher, was brought to Narayanganj from a poor village with the promise of work, but was sold to a sadarni (madam) of a brothel in Tanbazar. She was tortured when she refused to engage in prostitution, and died from her injuries in the Dhaka Medical College Hospital on 9 April 1985. Following her death, there was much media coverage against the brothel. A police raid on Tanbazar soon followed where 55 underage girls were discovered and removed and 15 sadarnis arrested who had control over the girls.

The sex workers had to pay protection money to the police and musclemen as well as providing free sex. They were also subject to extortion by local officials and political parties.

== Closure ==
On 25 June 1999, local Awami League MP Shamim Osman formed a committee of 50 members to close the brothel and rehabilitate the women working there. By 29 June 13 of the 16 property owners had agreed to shut their premises.

Police conducted a raid on the brothel on the night of 30 June and arrested 16 customers. Early the next morning a sex worker was murdered and tensions ran high, leading to a large police presence both inside and around the brothel.

Shamim Osman held a meeting on 3 July to announce that the sex workers were not being evicted by rehabilitated. "According to ... our constitution, prostitution is prohibited. Therefore, Prime Minister Sheikh Hasina has decided to sanction two crores (20 million) takas to rehabilitate them and offer them a new dawn," Osman is quoted as saying. The sex workers said they had no wish to be rehabilitated.

Under pressure from local authorities, and threats their other business interests would suffer, the property owners closed the brothel on 12 July 1999. The prostitutes refused to leave. Power and water to the brothel was cut off and a police cordon was put around the perimeter it to prevent anybody entering.

The leaders of the brothel held a press conference on 14 July, urging the government not to evict them. They were supported at the press conference by various NGOs: Naripokkho; Care Bangladesh; Nari Maitree; Bangladesh Women's Health Coalition and sex worker organisations.

140 police and 34 magistrates raided the brothel on 24 July. The prostitute's leader was arrested and many of them fled fearing they would be arrested, leaving all their possessions behind. 267 sex workers were detained and transferred to the Vagrancy Centre at Gazipur. Human rights group and the media reported that the police engaged in violence and looting during the raid: "the policemen suddenly dragged them, abused and beat them and pushed them and their children into the waiting buses using filthy language". Conditions at the Vagrancy Centre were inhumane. The women reported being tortured and raped by guards, centre employees and other detained vagrants.

59 organisations formed a group named Shonghoti to protest against the eviction and subsequent human rights violations suffered by the sex workers. The group were attacked by thugs backed by government politicians near the Narayanganj police station on 30 July. After watching for a while, the police joined in with batons and tear gas. 40 women activists were injured.

"Volunteer Association - 59" launched a writ action in the High Court for the violation of the sex workers' constitutional rights on 1 August. The High Court pronounced judgement on 14 March 2000. The main points of the judgement were that the profession of prostitution was not illegal, meaning that prostitutes had the right to defend their livelihoods in any way possible; and that the eviction and detention at the Vagrancy Centre was unlawful.

In August 2001 a group of around 100 sex workers tried to re-enter the brothel in an attempt to re-establish it. A fight broke out when the police moved to evict them, which lasted an hour before the brothel was cleared. At least 20 sex workers and 5 policemen were injured.

== See also ==
- Prostitution in Bangladesh
- Daulatdia
- Kandapara

== Bibliography ==
- Banerjee, Paula; Chaudhury, Sabyasachi Basu Ray; Das, Samir Kumar (2005). Internal Displacement in South Asia: The Relevance of the UN's Guiding Principles. SAGE Publishing India. ISBN 978-93-5280-016-2.
- Ditmore, Melissa Hope (2011). Prostitution and Sex Work. ABC-CLIO. ISBN 978-0-313-36289-7.
- Haque, Reazul (2015). Voices from the Edge: Justice, Agency and the Plight of Floating Sex Workers in Dhaka, Bangladesh. LIT Verlag Münster. ISBN 978-3-643-90637-3.
- Hossain, Mustak (12 July 1999). "2,000-room brothel shut eviction". The Independent.
- Hossain, Mustar (12 July 1999). "Prostitutes in Bangladesh fight eviction: Girls earn about $30 a day, but half goes to pay for rent". walnet.org. Archived from the original on 14 July 2020.
- Nanneththi, Nandana (27 August 1999). "Bangladesh government crackdown on women engaged in prostitution". www.wsws.org.
- Overs, Cheryl; Loff, Bebe (June 2013). "Toward a legal framework that promotes and protects sex workers' Health and Human Rights". Health and Human Rights. 15 (1).
- Shahana, Dilruba (1986). "Trafficking in Girls and Women in Bangladesh". Canadian Woman Studies. 7 (1–2): 114–116. ISSN 0713-3235.
- Turshen, M. (2007). Women's Health Movements: A Global Force for Change. Springer. ISBN 978-0-230-60712-5.
