= N765 (Bangladesh) =

Road in Bangladesh

N765
- Jashore–Satkhira Highway; Navaron-Satkhira Road; Satkhira–Kalaroa Road

Route information
- Length: 43 km (27 mi)

Major junctions
- Satkhira end: Khulna Road Interchange
- N715 / N760 - Khulna Road Intersection; N766 - Labsha Roundabout; N706 - Navaron Intersection
- Jashore end: Navaron Intersection

Location
- Country: Bangladesh

Highway system
- Roads in Bangladesh
← N760	→ N766

N760 or Jashore- Satkhira Highway is a Bangladeshi National highway which connects Satkhira with Jashore. Mainly it originates from N760 at Navaron and ends at N715 in Satkhira.
