= N715 (Bangladesh) =

National Highway of Bangladesh

N715
- Satkhira–Bhomra highway Satkhira–Shymnagar road

Route information
- Length: 15 km (9.3 mi)

Major junctions
- Satkhira end: Khulna Road Intersection
- N765 / N760 - Khulna Road Intersection; N766 - Medical College Intersection; R767 - Alipur Intersection; NH 312 -Bangladesh India Border
- Bhomra Land Port end: Bangladesh-India Border

Location
- Country: Bangladesh

Highway system
- Roads in Bangladesh
← N714	→ N716

N715 or Satkhira–Bhomra Highway is a national Highway of Bangladesh which is connected Satkhira to Bhomra Port. It starts at Khulna road Intersection and ends at the Bangladesh-India border where its meets NH 312.

== See also ==
- Bhomra Port
- Bhomra Union
