= N712 (Bangladesh) =

National Highway in Bangladesh

N712
- Jhenaidah Town Bypass Road

Route information
- Part of AH1
- Length: 6.2 km (3.9 mi)

Major junctions
- From: N7 in Al Hera Intersection
- N703 in Hamdah Intersection; R745 in Shaheed Sabbir Square; N704 / N703 in Arappur Interchange
- To: N7 at Perona 71 Square

Location
- Country: Bangladesh

Highway system
- Roads in Bangladesh
| ← N711 | → N713 |

Jhenaidah Town Bypass is a national highway which connects Al Hera Intersection to Perona 71 Square . The 6.2-kilometre (3.9 mi) is part of the Rajshahi–Khulna Highway. This highway plays an important role for regional and national connectivity in the western region.
