= Kandapara =

Brothel village in Bangladesh

Kandapara কান্দাপাড়া পতিতালয়
- Brothel village
- Location in Bangladesh
- Coordinates: 24.2421163°N 89.9105178°E
- Country: Bangladesh
- District: Tangail

Kandapara (Bengali: কান্দাপাড়া পতিতালয়) is a village in the Tangail District of Bangladesh. It is the oldest brothel (Note: The term Brothel is generally used for a single building where prostitution occurs, however, in the Indian subcontinent the term is used for an area where prostitution is well established.) in the country, being founded about 200 years ago, and was the second largest brothel in Bangladesh until the closure of the Tanbazar in 1999, when it became the largest. The area was demolished in 2014, but was rebuilt with the help of NGOs.

== Overview ==
Kandapara has a total of about 600 houses where between 900 and 1,200 sex workers live. The actual number may be higher as the area has many underage prostitutes and their presence is usually hidden by their mothers or the madams who they work for. Many 12-14-year-old girls come to Kandapara from poor families or are trafficked from various countries in southeast Asia including Nepal. These "bonded girls" are indebted to a madam and are unable to go out of the house or keep any of the money they earn until the debt is paid off. This may take 1–5 years, and once the debt is paid off they are free to leave. Due to stigmatisation outside the brothel area many choose to stay. One study found over 50% of the prostitutes were in debt, or had been in debt, to a madam.

In order to take up prostitution as a profession, a woman must submit an affidavit stating that they have chosen prostitution as their profession by choice and that they are unable to find another occupation. A cooperative named Nari Mukti Sangha was set up by the sex workers in 2005. The cooperative is a self-help group that aims to improve social, legal and human rights. It is registered with the government.

=== Drug use ===
The use of the steroid Oradexon is widespread amongst the sex workers. They take it to put on weight and obtain a fuller figure that clients prefer. Charities reported in 2012 that 90% of the sex workers were taking the steroid.

== History ==
The village was originally built on land owned by the local zamindar Santosh, during the British colonial era. Over time, various parts of the 3-acre area were sold to private owners. By 2014 the whole area was in private ownership, 39 plots belonging to sex workers and the remaining 10 lots all belonging to men.

In October 2006, the "Brothel Eviction Committee", led by the then Tangail Municipality chairman, Jamilur Rahman, and composed of local citizens and clerics, tried to close the area. A local citizen's committee opposed the closure without rehabilitation of the sex workers. Clashes broke out between the two factions, during which 14 people were injured. A few days later the High Court prohibited eviction of the sex workers without proper rehabilitation. Further unsuccessful attempts were made by the committee to close the area in 2010 and 2013.

=== 2014 closure ===
Municipality Mayor Shahidur Rahman Khan Mukti was behind a plot to evict the sex workers in 2014. It was alleged that Mukti wanted to build a market on the land. He set up the Oshamajik Karjokolap Protirodh Committee (the unsocial activities prevention committee) with the intent of turning public opinion against the brothel. Local imam, Maulana Ashrafuzzaman Kashemi, was made vice-president to try and get the local Muslim community behind the campaign. Meeting were held at the mosque after the Jumma prayer, with Mukti telling of the ill-effects the brothel were having on the area.

On 6 July, the committee submitted a memorandum to the mayor outlining the need to close the brothel and evict the workers. On the same day, Aklima Akter Akhi, leader of Nari Mukti Sangha (NMS) and representatives from the NGO Care Bangladesh met with the chairman of the National Human Rights Commission Mizanur Rahman Khan. Akhi was assured the sex workers would not be evicted. Three day later Akhi disappeared after a meeting with the brothel house owners, allegedly taking the funds of the NMS with her.

In a meeting at the Kabarsthan mosque on 11 July, the mayor and local MP, Md Sanowar Hossain, made the final decision to evict the sex workers. Expecting an eviction attempt after Friday prayers, the local police chief stationed 3 platoons of police at the brothel to prevent the eviction but no attempt was made.

The mayor had organised a grand iftar at the municipal offices on 12 July which it was reported 10,000 people attended. Some hours before the ifter was due to start, a group of armed young men gathered outside the brothel. They were led by the mayor's brother Kakon, local Jubo League joint secretary Sanowar Hossain and Swechchhasebak League joint convener Nasiruddin Nuru, both associates of the mayor. Around 6 pm a van arrived giving two drums of petrol to the group. The group threatened to lock the gates of the brothel and burn it down if they didn't leave immediately.

Soon after dark the power supply to the brothel was disconnected. The group allegedly assaulted and raped the sex workers during the blackout. Most of the sex workers fled without their possessions. The few that remained left the next day. The brothel was demolished over the next few days, allegedly by staff hired by the mayor.

The Oshamajik Karjokolap Protirodh Committee denied any knowledge of the eviction. Mayor Mukti claimed the brothel house owners had ordered the sex workers to leave. District police chief Saleh Mohammad Tanvir said the house owners had made the order following pressure from Muslim clerics and civil activists.

=== Reopening ===
Human rights organisations protested against the closure. On 19 July 2014 the sex workers, along with representatives of the Sex Workers Network (SWN) of Bangladesh, Care Bangladesh, Action Aid, ICDDRB, HASAB, UNAIDS, Save the Children, BLAST, and ASK formed a human chain outside the National Press Club demanding to be allowed back into the brothel and calling on the government and local administration to intervene on their behalf.

On 3 September the sex workers tried to repossess the brothel area but were evicted the next day and a police cordon set up to prevent them re-entering. In late 2014, the Bangladesh National Women Lawyers' Association brought an action in the High Court of Bangladesh, claiming that the eviction of the sex workers was illegal. The court ruled in their favour. After the ruling the sex workers returned to the brothel. With the help of NGOs the brothel was rebuilt.

The rebuilt brothel is surrounded by a 2-meter wall. Within the walls there are narrow streets, food stalls, tea shops and other vendors on the street and the accommodation for the sex workers.

== See also ==
- Prostitution in Bangladesh
- Daulatdia

== Notes and references ==
=== Bibliography ===
- Alam, Sheikh Sabiha; Shekhar, Kamanashish (26 July 2014). "Tangail mayor behind brothel eviction". Prothom Alo. Archived from the original on 23 June 2017.
- Azad, Abid; Chaity, Afrose Jahan (4 August 2014). "The blueprint of the Tangail brothel eviction". Dhaka Tribune.
- Bhandari, Megha. "Disturbing Truth About the House of Prostitution in Bangladesh (Kandapara brothel)". Tomatoheart.
- Biraj, Andrew Biraj (19 March 2012). "Bangladesh's "teenage" brothels hold dark steroid secret". Reuters.
- Dickerman, Kenneth (31 October 2016). "Inside the legal brothels of Bangladesh". The Independent.
- Dummett, Mark (30 May 2010). "Bangladesh's dark brothel steroid secret". BBC News.
- Nazmunnessa, Mahtab; Tania, Haque; Ishrat, Khan; Mynul, Khan; Binte, Khan (2017). Handbook of Research on Women's Issues and Rights in the Developing World. IGI Global. ISBN 978-1-5225-3019-0.
- Saha, Tapas Kumar (13 September 2015). "P14.22 To prevent hiv/aids through awareness raising and social behaviours change of sex worker in bangladesh - an experience from kandapara brothel, tangail, bangladesh". Sexually Transmitted Infections. 91 (Suppl 2): A206.2–A206. doi:10.1136/sextrans-2015-052270.534.
