= N702 (Bangladesh) =

National highway in Bangladesh

N702
- Jessore–Magura Highway; Dhaka–Jessore Highway

Route information
- Part of AH1
- Length: 44.12 km (27.41 mi)

Major junctions
- From: N7 in Magura
- To: N707 / N708 / N706 in Jessore

Location
- Country: Bangladesh

Highway system
- Roads in Bangladesh
← N701	→ N703

Jessore–Magura Highway or simply Magura Road is a national highway which connects Magura to Jessore. The 44.12-kilometre (27.41 mi) highway was also previously known as the Dhaka–Jessore Highway. This highway plays an important role for regional and national connectivity in the western region.
