= R747 (Bangladesh) =

Road in Bangladesh

R747
- Kushtia–Chuadanga Regional Highway
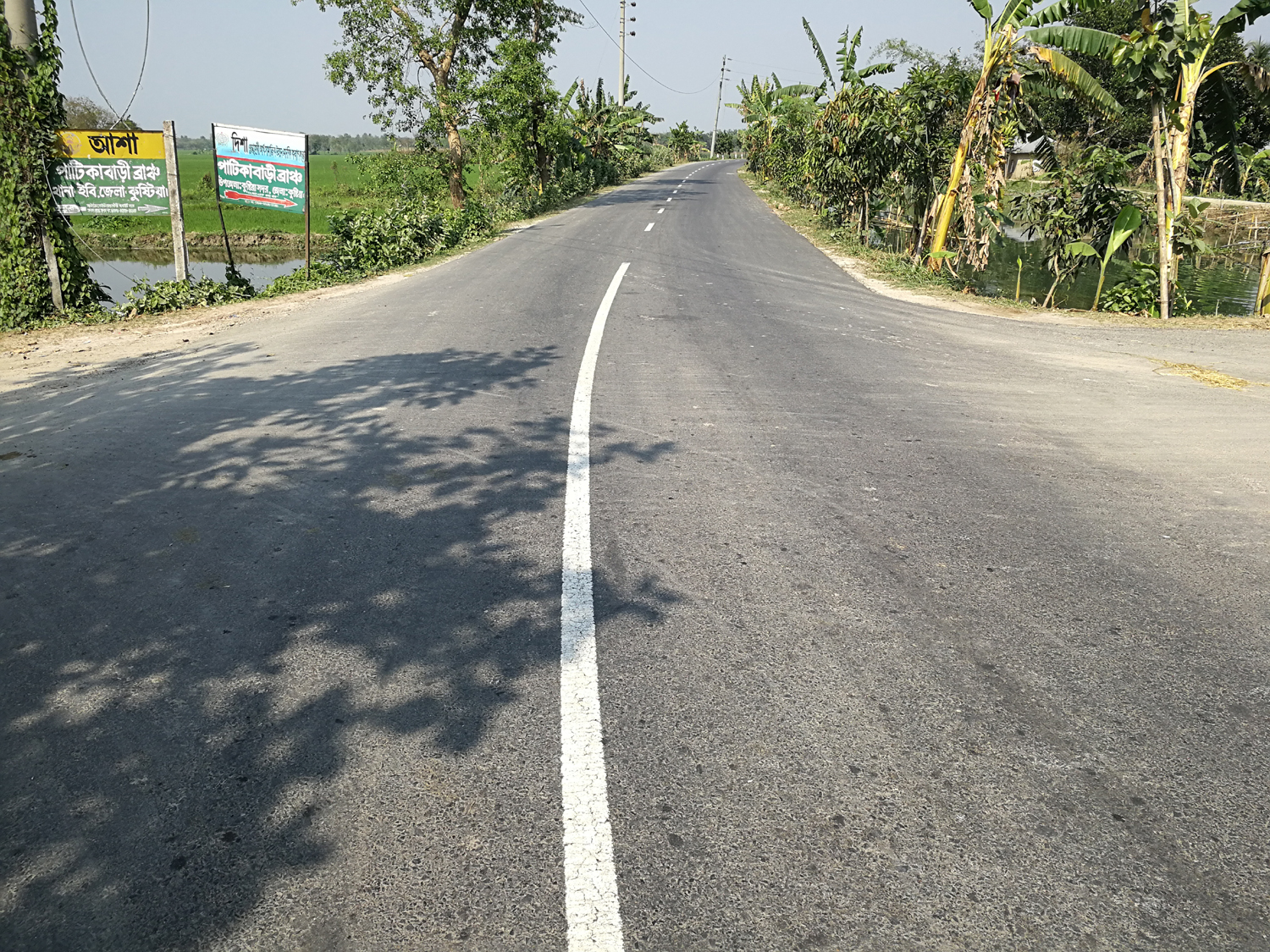
- Adjacent to Patikabari of Kushtia Sadar Upazila

Route information
- Length: 43.467 km (27.009 mi)

Major junctions
- Kushtia end: N704 (Bottoil intersection)
- Chuadanga end: R745 (Academy intersection)

Within Kushtia District
- Length: 25.863 km (16.071 mi)

Within Chuadanga District
- Length: 17.605 km (10.939 mi)

Location
- Country: Bangladesh

Highway system
- Roads in Bangladesh
← R745	→ N704

R747 (Bangladesh) or Kushtia-Chuadanga Regional Highway is a regional highway of Bangladesh located in Khulna Division. The road connects Kushtia and Chuadanga, two cities in Undivided Kushtia District.
