= N714 (Bangladesh) =

Road in Bangladesh

N714
- Khulna Medical University - Khulna Economic Zone Connecting Road; KMU - Economic zone link road

Route information
- Part of AH41
- Length: 12.13 km (7.54 mi)

Major junctions
- Khulna Medical University end: Medical University Interchange
- N709 - Mohammadnagar
- Batiaghata end: Khulna Economic Zone Interchange

Location
- Country: Bangladesh

Highway system
- Roads in Bangladesh
← N713	→ N715

N714 or the Khulna Medical University -Khulna Economic Zone Connecting Road is a national highway in Bangladesh. The road connects Khulna Medical University to Khulna Economic Zone in Labanchara.
