= N701 (Bangladesh) =

National highway in Bangladesh

N701
- Daulatdia Ghat Bypass Road

Route information
- Part of AH1
- Length: 1 km (0.62 mi)

Major junctions
- From: N7 in Terminal 3 Ferry ghat Intersection
- To: N7 in Daulatdia Zero point

Location
- Country: Bangladesh

Highway system
- Roads in Bangladesh
← N7	→ N702

Daulatdia Ferry Ghat bypass Road is a national highway which connects Daulatdia terminal 3 ferry ghat to Daulatdia Zero Point. The 1-kilometre (0.62 mi) highway was also known as the Terminal Road. This highway plays an important role for regional and national connectivity in the western region.
