= N7 (Bangladesh) =

National Highway in Bangladesh

N7
- Dhaka–Khulna Highway; Jashore - Khulna Road; Khulna–Mongla Road

Route information
- Part of AH1 AH41
- Length: 252 km (157 mi)

Major junctions
- Daulatdia end: Daulatdia Ferry Terminal
- Mongla end: Port of Mongla

Location
- Country: Bangladesh

Highway system
- Roads in Bangladesh
← N6	→ N8

The N7 is a Bangladeshi national highway connecting the Daulatdia Ferry Terminal, on the south bank of the Padma River near the Bangladeshi capital Dhaka, with the Port of Mongla in Bagerhat District. It serves some of the largest cities and towns in southwestern Bangladesh, including Faridpur, Magura, Jhenaidah, Jessore, and Khulna. The highway is known along various stretches as the Dhaka–Khulna Highway, the Jessore-Khulna Highway, and the Khulna-Mongla Highway.

Southwestern Bangladesh is laced with numerous rivers and streams, which results in the N7 having the most bridges and culverts of any highway in the national system. It is limited to two lanes of traffic for most of its length.

== Route description ==
The northern terminus of the N7 is the Daulatdia Ferry Terminal, on the south bank of the Padma River. Although sometimes called the Dhaka—Khulna Highway, the city of Dhaka lies across the river and 70 kilometres (43 mi) east of the end of the road. Long delays waiting to cross the river fuel the prostitution that makes Daulatdia the largest brothel in Bangladesh, and one of the largest in the world.

Beginning at the ferry terminal, the N7 goes southwest for 14 km before it turns southeast and parallels the river as far as the junction with N803 just west of Faridpur. Skirting the city, the highway turns west to Magura where N702 splits off. The N7 continues west from Magura to Jhenaidah, a stretch that is the second deadliest in the national highway network. It makes a three-quarters loop around the north and west sides of Jhenaidah, with N704 splitting off at Arappur and N703 going into the centre of the city, before N7 turns south to Jessore. The segment between Jhenaidah and Jessore is the busiest one on the highway. At Palbari, just north of Jessore, N708 branches off. In Jessore N7 is rejoined by N702, and N706 splits off. Just south of Jessore, N707 merges at Murali.

N7 continues southeast, passing through Khulna, the largest city on the highway and the administrative headquarters of Khulna Division. N709 is a bypass that takes off from Phultala, north of Khulna, and rejoins south of the city at Kudir Battala, crossing the Rupsha River by bridge instead of, as the main road continues through the city including neighborhood like Daulatpur, Boikali, New Market. In KCC area most of part of this road is called Jashore Road. At Ferry Ghat more the N7 changes its alignment to Khan Jahan Ali road and continues to Rupsha ghat, crossing Rupsha river by ferry. The southern terminus of N7 is Bangladesh's second busiest seaport, the Port of Mongla, at the junction of the Mongla and Pasur Rivers.

== Junction list ==
Division	Location	km	Mile	Destinations	Notes
Dhaka Division	Daulatdia				Ferry connects to N5 at Paturia Port
Dhaka Division	Goalanda			N701	
Dhaka Division	Ahladipur			R710	to Rajbari
Dhaka Division	Faridpur			N804	
Khulna Division	Magura			N702	to Jashore
Khulna Division	Jhenaidah			N712, N703 & N704	N712 to Arappur, N703 to Jhenaidah town and N704 to Dasuria
Khulna Division	Hamdah			N712	to Arappur
Khulna Division	Kaliganj			R748	to Kotchandpur
Khulna Division	Palbari, Jashore			N707	to Jashore town
Khulna Division	Chanchra, Jashore			N706	to Benapole
Khulna Division	Murali, Jashore			N707	to Jashore town
Khulna Division	Phultala			N709	Khulna City Bypass
Khulna Division	Power House More			N760	to Satkhira
Khulna Division	Ferry Ghat More			N710	to Old town
Khulna Division	Rupsha Ghat				
Khulna Division	Ferry				
Khulna Division	Rupsha East				
Khulna Division	Kudir Battala			N709	
Khulna Division	Katakhali			N805	to Bhanga
Khulna Division	Port of Mongla				The route end at the port.
