= N716 (Bangladesh) =

N716
- Khulna–Terokhoda-Gopalganj Highway; Khulna-Terokhoda Road; Terokhoda–Chandradighalia Road

Route information
- Length: 35 km (22 mi)

Major junctions
- Khulna end: Jailkhana Ghat
- N710 - Jail Khana Ghat; N805 - Chandradighalia Intersection
- Gopalganj end: Chandradighalia Intersection

Location
- Country: Bangladesh

Highway system
- Roads in Bangladesh
← N715	→ N760

The N716, or Khulna-Terokhoda-Gopalganj Road, is a national highway connecting Khulna with Gopalganj. This is an alternative route of the N805 from Khulna to Bhanga via Gopalganj. This road starts from Jail Khana Ghat of Khulna and ends at Chandradighalia Intersection of Gopalganj.
