= Human trafficking in Bangladesh =

Bangladesh is a source and transit country for men, women, and children subjected to trafficking in persons, specifically forced labor and forced prostitution. A significant share of Bangladesh's trafficking victims are men recruited for work overseas with fraudulent employment offers who are subsequently exploited under conditions of forced labor or debt bondage. It also includes the trafficking of children – both boys and girls – within Bangladesh for commercial sexual exploitation, bonded labor, and forced labor. Some children are sold into bondage by their parents, while others are induced into labor or commercial sexual exploitation through fraud and physical coercion. Women and children from Bangladesh are also trafficked .

== Background ==
Bangladeshi men and women migrate willingly to Germany, Malaysia, Norway, Qatar, Russia, Saudi Arabia, the United Arab Emirates (UAE), the United Kingdom, the United States, and other countries for work, often under legal and contractual terms. Most Bangladeshis who seek overseas employment through legal channels rely on the 724 recruiting agencies belonging to the Bangladesh Association of International Recruiting Agencies (BAIRA). These agencies are legally permitted to charge workers up to $1,235 and place workers in low-skilled jobs typically paying between $110 and $150 per month. According to NGOs, however, many workers are charged upwards of $6,000 for these services. A recent Amnesty International report on Malaysia indicated Bangladeshis spend more than three times the amount of recruitment fees paid by other migrant workers recruited for work in Malaysia. NGOs report many Bangladeshi migrant laborers are victims of recruitment fraud, including exorbitant recruitment fees often accompanied by fraudulent representation of terms of employment. The ILO has concluded high recruitment fees increase vulnerability to forced labor among transnational migrant workers. Women typically work as domestic servants; some find themselves in situations of forced labor or debt bondage where they face restrictions on their movements, non-payment of wages, threats, and physical or sexual abuse. Some Bangladeshi women working abroad are subsequently trafficked into commercial sexual exploitation. Bangladeshi children and adults are also trafficked internally for commercial sexual exploitation, domestic servitude, and bonded labor. Recent reports indicate many brothel owners and pimps addict Bangladeshi girls to steroids, with harmful side effects, to make them more attractive to clients; the drug is reported to be used by 90 percent of females between 15 and 35 in Bangladeshi brothels.

The process of trafficking through various routes, especially sea route:

Bangladeshi people are trafficked through various routes, like sea, air, land etc. 2.5 lakh Bangladeshi fortune-seekers have been lured into the trap of trafficking through sea route in last 8 years. [27] Emran Hossain and Mohammad Ali Zinnat with Martin Swapan Pandey mutually wrote an article in the Daily Star named “Slave Trade Booms in Dark Triangle”. In this article, there was a picture drawn where seven steps of trafficking in sea route were mentioned. Cox's Bazar especially teknaf town is the main sea route for smuggling Bangladeshis and Rohingyas towards Southeast Asian countries. Each victim of trafficking has to pay a lot of taka in every step which can be estimated between Tk. 2,50,000 and Tk. 4,50,000. [28] During traveling through the Bay of Bengal, a fortune-seeker has to stay 25 to 30 days, sometimes two months in a small fishing boat. Many passengers die from dehydration or starvation in the ship and their bodies are tossed into the ocean. UNHCR estimates that in 2014 alone, 750 people died at sea on this route. [29] The boats land in Thailand. The survivors of the boat are detained in a jungle camp. A big amount between Tk. 2 lakh and 3.5 lakh is claimed from the victims as ransom [30] . The detained persons are not sent to country of destination, especially Malaysia if they fail to pay ransom claimed. If anyone fails to pay the ransom, he is used as slave or killed by the traffickers. The dead bodies are either tossed into the ocean or buried in Thai Jungle. 26 bodies were found in Sadao district, Songkhla province of Thailand on 2 May 2015[31] . Thai authority suspected that they were trafficked migrants from Bangladesh and Myanmar. Many jobseekers are victimized after reaching the country of destination by robbing the passport and visa of that country and they are victimized of forced labor by the traffickers. The victim can do nothing against the traffickers fearing the arrest as illegal migrant. Some fenceless women are trafficked to India, Pakistan, or Nepal crossing the border for sexual exploitation. Some women are smuggled to the Middle East as house-keepers, but actually they are victimized of trafficking for the purpose of prostitution.

The country of destination for trafficking from Bangladesh:

Almost 10 million Bangladeshi migrants work all over the world. Among them 90% stay in Middle Eastern countries [32], like Saudi Arabia, UAE, Qatar, Syria, Iraq, Iran, Yemen, Lebanon, Oman, Kuwait, Bahrain, Egypt etc. Many Bangladeshi trafficking victims including men and women are victimized in those countries either for sexual exploitation, or for forced labor. Bangladeshis are lured to go to those countries, because some successful Bangladeshi migrants stay there. A number of Bangladeshi women including girls under 18 and children are trafficked to India, Pakistan, and some other South Eastern countries including Malaysia, Indonesia, and Thailand whether for sexual exploitation, forced labor, or removal of organs. From 2011, almost all Middle Eastern countries closed to appoint workers from Bangladesh. Therefore, they are lured into trap to go to South Eastern countries and they are victimized of trafficking.

Bangladesh does not fully comply with the minimum standards for the elimination of trafficking; however, it is making significant efforts to do so. The government has continued to address the sex trafficking of women and children. Despite these significant efforts, the government did not demonstrate evidence of increased efforts to prosecute and convict labor trafficking offenders, particularly those responsible for the fraudulent recruitment of Bangladeshi workers for the purpose of forced labor overseas. Similarly it did not demonstrate increased efforts to prevent the forced labor of Bangladeshi workers overseas through effective controls on high recruitment fees and other forms of fraudulent recruitment; therefore, Bangladesh is placed on the Tier 3 Watch List for the second consecutive year. Some government officials and members of civil society continue to believe the forced labor and debt bondage of Bangladeshi workers abroad was not considered labor trafficking, but rather employment fraud perpetrated on irregular migrants.

In December 2011, the government put into place an anti-trafficking law which took into account the missing legislative prohibitions pertaining to the trafficking of men. With the newly implemented anti-trafficking action plan more prosecutions were made, but the number of convictions declined in comparison to previous years. The National Action Plan to Combat Human Trafficking for 2012-2014 was implemented in January 2011 by the Ministry of Home Affairs (MHA) and in 2012, the Human Trafficking Deterrence and Suppression Act (HTDSA) was drafted by the government, but due to the lack of adequate law enforcement efforts, the trafficking of migrant workers continued to occur in Bangladesh.

By 2015, Bangladesh government implementation of the 2012 Preven

tion and Suppression of Human Trafficking Act (PSHTA) was still not finalized. Also, that year nine government- operated shelters took in 2,621 victims. Between 2014 and 2015, there was a significant increase in the number of prosecutions, from 12 in 2014 to 265 in 2015. The government also launched the national action plan for 2015-2017, but was once again not capable of finalizing the PSHTA before the 2016 reporting period came to an end. In 2017, the 2012 PSHTA was finalized and implement, showing significant efforts from the Bangladesh government. By the end of the reporting year however, the government's investigation, prosecution, and conviction numbers decreased in comparison to previous years.

U.S. State Department's Office to Monitor and Combat Trafficking in Persons placed the country in "Tier 2 Watchlist" in 2017.

Bangladesh remained on the Tier 2 watchlist for 3 consecutive years and was upgraded to Tier 2 after the 2020 reporting year.

== Prosecution ==
The Government of Bangladesh did not provide evidence of increasing efforts to combat sex trafficking or forced labor during the reporting period. Bangladesh prohibits the trafficking of women and children for the purpose of commercial sexual exploitation or involuntary servitude under the Repression of Women and Children Act of 2000 (amended in 2003), and prohibits the selling and buying of a Prostitution of children child under the age of 18 for prostitution in Articles 372 and 373 of its penal code. Prescribed penalties under these sex trafficking statutes range from 10 years’ imprisonment to the death penalty. The most common sentence imposed on convicted sex traffickers is life imprisonment. These penalties are very stringent and commensurate with those prescribed for other serious crimes, such as rape. Article 374 of Penal code of Bangladesh|Bangladesh's penal code prohibits forced labor, but the prescribed penalties of imprisonment for up to one year or a fine are not sufficiently stringent.

During the reporting period, the government obtained the convictions of 32 sex trafficking offenders and sentenced 24 of them to life imprisonment; eight were sentenced to lesser prison terms. This is a slight decrease from the 37 convictions obtained in 2008. The government did not report the conviction of any labor trafficking offenders. The government prosecuted 68 cases involving suspected sex trafficking offenders and conducted 26 investigations, compared with 90 prosecutions and 134 investigations during the previous year. Forty-nine prosecutions resulted in acquittals; however, under Bangladeshi law the term "acquittal" can also refer to cases in which the parties settled out of court or witnesses did not appear in court. Despite administrative actions taken against labor recruitment agencies involved in fraudulent recruitment and possible human trafficking, the government did not report any criminal prosecutions or convictions for labor trafficking offenses. The Bangladeshi judicial system's handling of sex trafficking cases continued to have a large backlog and delays caused by procedural loopholes. Most sex trafficking cases are prosecuted by 42 special courts for the prosecution of crimes of violence against women and children in 32 districts of the country; those courts are generally more efficient than regular trial courts.

In 2015, the government reported the investigation of 181 sex and 265 labor trafficking cases, compared to the 146 sex and 12 labor trafficking cases of 2014. Under the 2012 PSHTA, 481 alleged traffickers were prosecuted in 2015, in which 4 were prosecuted. The number of investigated trafficking cases decreased in the 2017 reporting year compared to the numbers reported in 2016, only 122 sex and 168 labor trafficking cases were investigated.

The Ministry of Home Affairs’ Anti-Trafficking Monitoring Cell reportedly collected data on trafficking arrests, prosecutions, and rescues, and coordinated and analyzed local-level information from regional anti-trafficking units. During the year, there was some evidence of official complicity in human trafficking. Several NGOs reported a nexus among members of parliament and corrupt recruiting agencies and village level brokers and indicated that politicians and regional gangs were involved in human trafficking. Some NGOs also report that official recruitment agencies in Dhaka have linkages with employers in destination countries who sometimes put their migrant workers in situations of servitude. Low-level government employees were also complicit in trafficking. According to the Ministry of Home Affairs, the government prosecuted a civil servant who was complicit in trafficking; the trial remained ongoing at the end of the reporting period. The government confirmed the existence of allegations against some Bangladeshi soldiers in Sierra Leone who may have engaged in or facilitated trafficking, but the government did not provide any information on investigations or prosecutions of these cases. The country's National Police Academy (Bangladesh)|National Police Academy provided anti-trafficking training to 2,876 police officers in 2009. The 12 police officers of the Ministry of Home Affairs’ "Trafficking in Human Beings Investigation Unit" continued to receive training on investigation techniques. Other government officials received training from NGOs, international organizations, and foreign governments. A 2009 report from a prominent NGO suggested that law enforcement trainings have not translated into increased prosecutions or a change in outlook.

Within the reporting period for 2015, the government provided anti-trafficking training to 10,890 police officers in 94 different training programs. These numbers increased in 2016, with 186 anti-trafficking training programs with 29,889 police officers. It was reported that police were observed to have taking bribes and sexual favors in order to ignore potential trafficking crimes.

In September 2016, a former Bangladeshi consular officer and his wife were brought in front of a New York federal court and ordered to pay a fine to the Bangladeshi plaintiff in an alleged violation of the TVPA and federal and state labor laws. The officer appealed the case, and left the United States. In January 2018, he pled guilty. Another Bangladeshi official that was on a peacekeeping mission was investigated, prosecuted and convicted in 2016 of sexually exploiting a child.

In the 2018 reporting year, it was an evident that the Bangladeshi government did not meet the minimum standards for eliminating trafficking since they only reported 1 victim. The number of police officers that were trained on human trafficking increased that year to 50,780, but did not specify if they were being trained on PSHTA, and it still remained a major problem with the compliancy of officials in trafficking offences. NGO's reported that local politicians had convinced victims to accept payments from recruitment sub-agents so that no fraudulent or exploitative actions could be reported to police.

Reports from 2019 did not show significant changes, and Bangladesh was granted a waiver from the TVPA so that it would not be downgraded to Tier 3. During the reporting year, police arrested a police officer who had allegedly recruited two 12-year-old girls for employment and sexual exploitation. Another two Bangladeshi border guards propositioned two girls for commercial sex and rapped them, to which the commanding officer referred to the allegations as rumours and did not report law informant actions upon the guards, and police prevented NGO personnel from speaking to the girls while they were in hospital.

== Protection ==
The Government of Bangladesh made limited efforts to protect victims of trafficking over the last year. The government's lack of efforts to protect victims of forced labor – who constitute a large share of victims in the country – and adult male victims of trafficking is a continuing concern. While the government did not have a systematic procedure to identify and refer female and child victims of trafficking, the courts, police, or Home Ministry officials referred victims of internal trafficking to shelters. Law enforcement officials identified and rescued 68 victims (38 females and 30 children) in the reporting period, but it is uncertain whether they were referred to shelters. In the previous year, law enforcement officials identified and rescued 251 victims. While the government did not provide shelter or other services dedicated to trafficking victims, it continued to run nine homes for women and children victims of violence, including trafficking, as well as a "one-stop crisis center" for women and children in the Dhaka general hospital. These centers, in cooperation with NGOs, provided legal, medical, and psychiatric services. During the last year, 384 victims were served by government and NGO care facilities in Bangladesh; some of these may have been victims of trafficking. The Ministry of Expatriate Welfare and Overseas Employment continued to operate shelters for female Bangladeshi victims of trafficking and exploitation in Riyadh and Jeddah. Law enforcement personnel encouraged victims of trafficking, when identified, to participate in investigations and prosecutions of their traffickers, but there was no evidence of the number of victims who assisted in investigations and prosecutions of traffickers in the reporting period. Authorities did not penalize victims for unlawful acts committed as a direct result of their being trafficked. When no space was available in shelter homes, however, female victims of trafficking – as wards of the police or court – stayed in jails. From February to October 2009, local police in India rescued seven adult female Bangladeshi sex trafficking victims. In March 2010 – after some of the women had remained in shelters for over a year in India – the Government of Bangladesh began working with NGOs and the Government of India Indian government to repatriate these women. As of the writing of this report, the process has not been finalized. In 2016, the government identified 355 victims, of which were 212 men, 138 women, and 5 children, and 204 of them had been directly recovered by police from exploitation. In comparison with previous years, 1,815 victims in 2015 and 2,899 in 2014, insignificant rehabilitation services were provided to victims according to NGOs.

While workers ostensibly had several options to address complaints of labor and recruitment violations and to get compensation, the process most often used – arbitration by Bangladesh Association of International Recruiting Agencies (BAIRA) – did not provide sufficient financial compensation and rarely addressed the illegal activities of some recruitment agencies, all of which are BAIRA members. The Bureau of Manpower Employment and Training (BMET), which is charged with overseeing recruitment agencies and monitoring the condition of Bangladeshi workers overseas, regularly steers workers with complaints to BAIRA for resolution. Workers are drawn to the BAIRA complaint mechanism because it offers quick cash payouts (though usually much less than the wages they were denied and the recruitment fees paid) and requires significantly less proof of paid fees – most fees charged were illegal and thus had no corresponding receipts. If there are "major" disputes, recruitment agencies may lose their licenses; however, NGOs report that friends and family members of agency heads successfully file for new licenses. Recruitment agencies may also incur criminal charges.

According to Ministry of Expatriate Welfare and Overseas Employment (MEWOE), the government disposed 893 of 1,030 labor complaints in the reporting period (as opposed to disposing 745 complaints of 1,010 the year before); some of these complaints were likely due to trafficking offenses. NGOs allege officials working at Bangladeshi embassies abroad were mostly unresponsive to complaints and attempts to seek restitution abroad were rare. The Government of Bangladesh continued to donate land for an IOM project which established a coffee stand run by rehabilitated trafficking victims.

In 2019 the government investigated 403 cases under the PSHTA, prosecuted 312 suspects, and convicted 25 individuals in nine trafficking-related cases. This showed a decrease in investigations, but an increase in convictions since the last reporting period. As of December 2019, 4,407 trafficking cases were still pending investigation or prosecution.

== Prevention ==
The Bangladeshi government failed to take adequate efforts to prevent the forced labor of Bangladeshis abroad and at home, and made modest efforts to prevent sex trafficking over the reporting period. During the reporting period, the BMET reportedly shut down one recruiting agency, cancelled the licenses and confiscated the security deposit money of six agencies for their involvement in fraudulent recruitment practices that potentially facilitated human trafficking. This is a decrease from the nine agencies shut down and 25 agencies whose licenses were cancelled in the previous reporting period. BMET collected approximately $830,000 in fines from recruitment agencies for fraudulent recruitment practices and other infractions. The government continued to allow BAIRA to set fees, license individual agencies, certify workers for overseas labor, and handle most complaints of expatriate laborers, while not exercising adequate oversight over this consortium of labor recruiters to ensure their practices do not facilitate debt bondage of Bangladeshi workers abroad. Various ministries disseminated numerous anti-sex trafficking messages in forums including public service announcements, discussions, songs, rallies, and posters. The Monitoring Cell reported anti-sex trafficking messaging was included in monthly public outreach sessions conducted by government heads in each of Bangladesh's 65 units. The Home Secretary continued to chair the monthly inter-ministerial National Anti- Trafficking Committee Meetings, which oversees district-level committees in 64 districts. The Home Secretary also regularly holds coordination committee meetings with NGOs, although some NGOs note that the meetings often have broad agendas and do not focus adequately on trafficking. The Ministry of Home Affairs published the Bangladesh Country Report on Combating Trafficking in Women and Children. While the government made the registration compulsory in 2006, the national rate of birth registration is only between seven and 10 percent, and most children born in the rural areas are still not properly documented. During the year, the government did not demonstrate measures to reduce the demand for forced labor or for commercial sex acts. Bangladesh is not a party to the 2000 UN TIP Protocol.

The government signed a new agreement for the migration of up to 1.5 million Bangladeshi workers to Malaysia in February 2016. The agreement was to reduce the impact of the fees from private recruitment agencies, but unfortunately caused an increase on the fees paid by Malaysian companies who employ foreign workers. Shortly after the agreement was signed, Malaysia banned the recruitment of foreign works, nullifying the agreement.

In February 2017, Bangladeshi and Malaysian governments began to implement the inter-governmental agreement that had been signed the previous year.

The 2013 Overseas Employment Migrants Act (OEMA) made fraudulent recruitment and unlawful fees criminal, but the government-set recruitment fees were at such high rates in 2018 that they indebted migrant workers and made them vulnerable to trafficking. In 2017, the MEWOE, which is under the OEMA, removed or suspended the licenses of 29 recruitment agencies, gave fines to 12 agencies, and delivered prison sentences to four agents. The government began to draft its 2018-2022 National Action Plan in partnership with international organizations.

== See also ==
- Human rights in Bangladesh
