= Jeshoreshwari Kali Temple =

Hindu temple in Bangladesh

- শ্রীশ্রী যশোরেশ্বরী কালী মন্দির
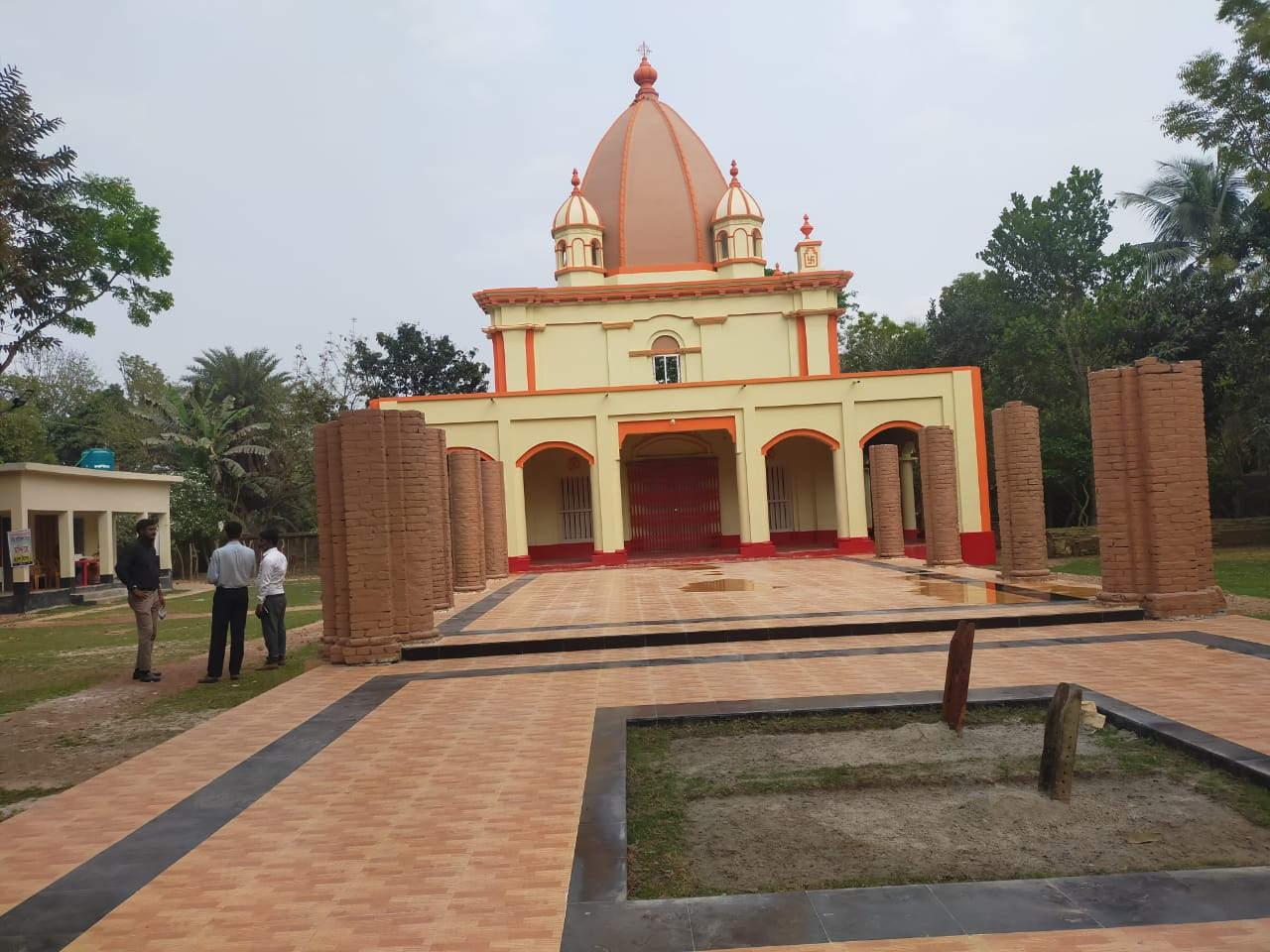
- Jeshoreshwari Temple after 2021 renovation

- Location within Bangladesh

Religion
- Affiliation: Hinduism
- District: Satkhira district
- Deity: Kali
- Festivals: Kali Puja; Durga Puja
- Governing body: Government of Bangladesh

Location
- Location: Ishwaripur, Shyamnagar
- Country: Bangladesh
- Coordinates: 22.306216°N 89.112772°E people minister

Architecture
- Style: Ratna Style
- Creator: Anaree
- Established: 13th Century (originally); 2021 (renovation)
- Demolished: 1971 (partially)

Jeshoreshwari Kali Temple (Bengali: যশোরেশ্বরী কালী মন্দির) is an ancient Hindu temple in Bangladesh to the Hindu goddess Kali in Ishwaripur, a village in Shyamnagar upazila of Satkhira. It is one of the 51 Shakta pithas, where according to legend Sati's palms and soles fell. The name "Jeshoreshwari" means "goddess of Jeshore".

Indian Prime Minister Narendra Modi prayed there on 27 March 2021 and donated a crown which was stolen in October 2024.
