= R755 (Bangladesh) =

Regional highway of Bangladesh

R755
- Jashore–Keshabpur Road

Route information
- Maintained by Bangladesh Road Transport Authority
- Length: 38 km (24 mi)

Major junctions
- North end: Rajarhat Intersection, Jashore
- South end: Chuknagar Intersection, Khulna

Location
- Country: Bangladesh
- Major cities: Keshabpur

Highway system
- Roads in Bangladesh
← N7	→ N760

The R755 or Jashore–Keshabpur–Chuknagar Road is regional highway which connects Rajarhat to Chuknagar and connects two national highways at Rajarhat by N7 and in Chuknagar by N760.
