= Jashore Govt. Mahila College =

Girls College in Jashore, Khulna, Bangladesh

- যশোর সরকারি মহিলা কলেজ
- Type: Public
- Established: 1995; 31 years ago
- Affiliations: National University, Bangladesh
- Students: 5,974
- Location: Jessore, Khulna Division, Bangladesh; 23.1668°N 89.1989°E
- Campus: City
- Website: www.jgmc.gov.bd

Jashore Govt. Mahila College is a post-graduate educational institution located in Jashore district town in the Khulna Division of southern Bangladesh.

== History ==
Jessore Govt. Mahila College was established in 1985 with the efforts of the enthusiasts of Jessore to spread women's education in South Bengal. In 1970, the college was nationalized as 'Jessore Government Women's College'. Since its inception, the college has been playing a vital role in the education of women in the area. Teaching is done at Higher Secondary, Degree (Pass), Degree (Hons), and Masters levels. Currently, the college offers Honors and Masters courses in 9 subjects.
