= N707 (Bangladesh) =

National highway in Bangladesh

N707
- Jessore City North-South connecting road

Route information
- Part of AH41
- Length: 7 km (4.3 mi)

Major junctions
- From: N7 / N708 in Palbari intersection
- N708 / N806 in Monihar
- To: N7 in Murali intersection

Location
- Country: Bangladesh

Highway system
- Roads in Bangladesh
| ← N706 | → N708 |

N707 or Jessore City north-south connecting road is a national highway. This road connect two side of the city of Jessore. The road starts from Palbari intersection from where it is known as Mashiur Rahman Road until Daratana Interchange, and from Daratana Interchange to Manihar Intersection where it known as Rabindranath Tagore Road. Lastly from Manihar Intersection to Murali intersection, it known as Khulna Road.
