= Debnathpur =

- Village
- Location belatole India
- Country: India
- State: West Bengal
- District: Nadia
- Headquarters: Tehatta

Languages
  - Official: Bengali, English
- Time zone: UTC+5:30 (IST)
- ISO 3166 code: ISO 3166-2:IN
- Website: nadia.nic.in

Debnathpur is a village under the Tehatta subdivision of the Nadia district in the Indian state of West Bengal. It belongs to the community development block of Tehatta I.

== Area ==
The village situated in the border of Bangladesh and India besides the border road, constructed by the Border Security Force (BSF). The State highway no. 11 passes through the village.

== Tehatta–I block ==
Debnathpur belongs to Tehatta–I block. The block is a rural area consisting of 11 gram panchayats: Betai–I, Chhitka, Patharghata–I, Shyamnagar, Betai–II, Kanainagar, Patharghata–II, Tehatta, Chanderghat, Natna and Raghunathpur. There is no urban area in this block. The Tehatta police station serves the Tehatta I block.

== Education ==
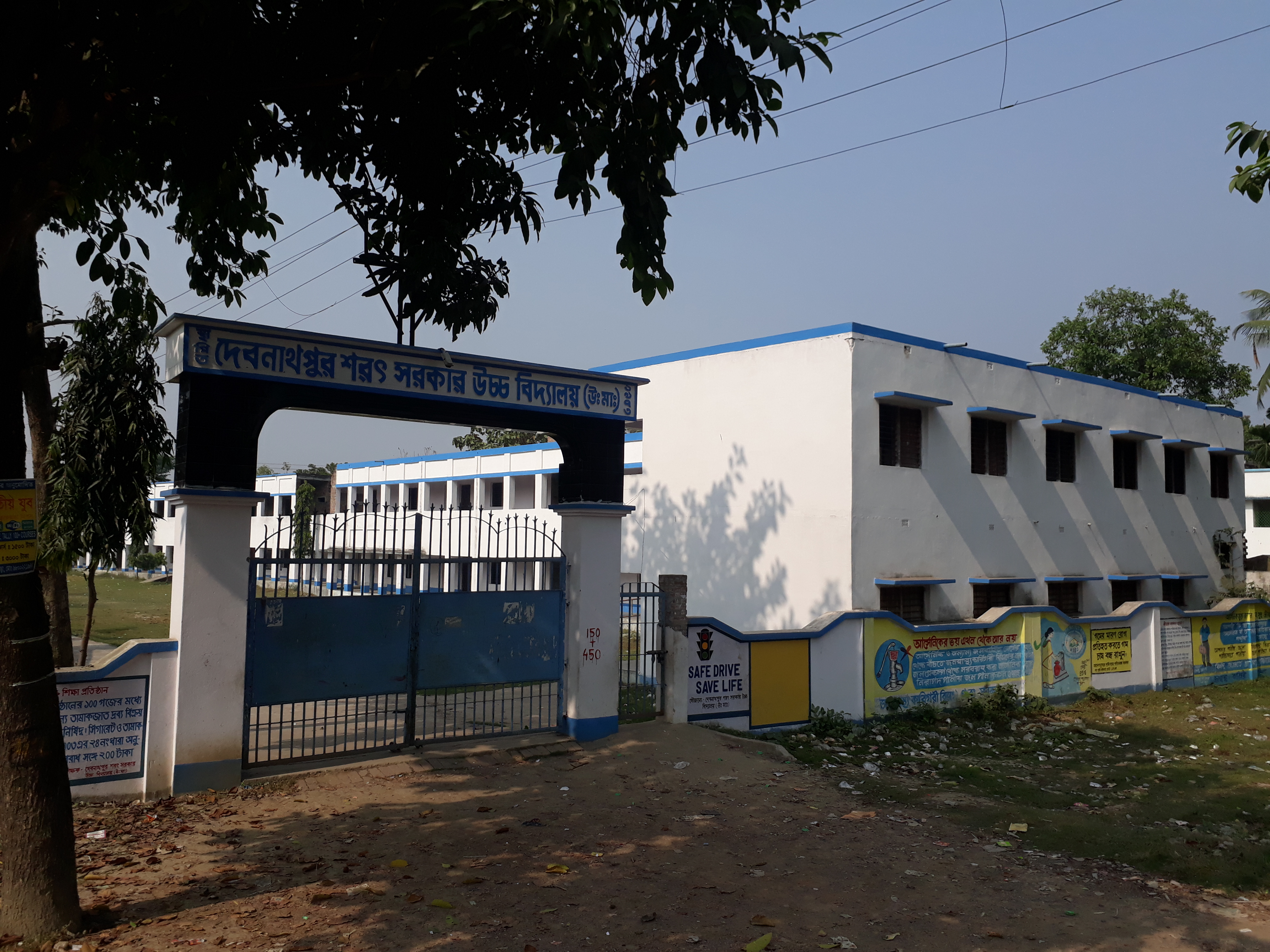
Debnathpur Sharat Sarkar High School

There is a High School named Sharat Sarkar High School beside the State Highway. This is an Upper Primary with Secondary and Higher Secondary School situated at Natna near Debnathpur Village of Tehatta I. It was established in the year 1973 and the school management is under the Department of School Education. It's a Bengali medium - Co-educational school.
