= Battail Union =

Battail Union বটতৈল ইউনিয়ন
- Union
- Battail Union
- Country: Bangladesh
- Division: Khulna
- District: Kushtia
- Upazila: Kushtia Sadar
- Established: 1974

Area
  - Total: 44.99 km^{2} (17.37 sq mi)

Population (2011)
  - Total: 43,117
  - Density: 958.4/km^{2} (2,482/sq mi)
- Time zone: UTC+6 (BST)
- Website: 4nobottailup.kushtia.gov.bd

Battail Union (Bengali: বটতৈল ইউনিয়ন) is a union parishad situated at Kushtia Sadar Upazila, in Kushtia District, Khulna Division of Bangladesh. The union has an area of 44.99 square kilometres (17.37 sq mi) and as of 2001 had a population of 43,117. There are 13 villages and 3 mouzas in the union.
