= Prostitution in Bangladesh =

Legal status of prostitution across Asia. Decriminalization – No criminal penalties for prostitution Legalization – prostitution is legal and is regulated in some cases Abolitionism – prostitution is legal, but organized activities such as brothels and pimping are illegal; prostitution is not regulated Neo-abolitionism – illegal to buy sex and for 3rd party involvement, legal to sell sex Prohibitionism – prostitution illegal Legality varies with local laws

Prostitution is legal in Bangladesh but regulated by law. According to the law, only adult women can engage in professional sex work by making a declaration in court, although among the hundreds of thousands of sex workers in Bangladesh, a large number are children. Generally, three types of sex workers are seen in Bangladesh: hotel-based, floating in parks and gardens, and brothel-based. Although several brothels were demolished in the 20th and 21st centuries, in 2020 there were 14 registered brothels in Bangladesh. While professional female sex work is legal, professional male sex work is illegal, though it exists in various places. According to research, there are 200,000 sex workers in Bangladesh, among whom 10,000 to 29,000 are underage.

== Naming ==
In Bangladesh, sex workers are also referred to in dictionaries as dehoposharini, nagorbodhu, beshya, rokhkita, khanki, jarini, punshcholi, atitwari, gonika, kulta, baronbonita, kumbhodashi, noti, rupojibi, etc. According to dictionaries, they are also identified by terms such as khanki, "magi", chhinal, chenal, gonika, goneruka, dehopojibini, noti, notini, barangana, barbodhu, barbilasini, patita, beshya, bhrashta, jounokormi, randi, rupopojibini, hattobilasini, etc. Words like beshya, patita, gonika, bondhoki, barangana, khanki, along with others, form around 300 Bengali synonyms for professional sex workers. Since there is freedom to choose one's profession, in modern times, those involved in this profession are not referred to by degrading terms from dictionaries but are instead identified as professional sex workers.

"Those who, due to poverty, deception, coercion, helplessness, and other adverse conditions, engage in sexual activities in exchange for money or gifts — thus becoming involved in a profession that goes against morality" — the government of Bangladesh has identified them as "socially disabled women."

== History ==
Sex workers are mentioned in Kautilya's Arthashastra, written in 300 BCE, where their annual income is stated as 1,000 panas. According to the contemporary work Kamasutra by Vatsyayana, in ancient times, sex work was considered a developed art form. However, although it was a state-recognized profession, it was not always regarded as honorable. According to the Mahabharata, if a sex worker had a good nature, she could be reborn into a higher life in her next birth. This same view is held in Buddhism as well. In ancient times, women's dance performances were also a part of sexual service, and those involved in this profession were called notini, gonika, or nartaki.

In the writings of Jain author Hemachandra, it is said that "King Nanda" was the son of a barber born from the womb of a sex worker. Buddhist texts mention several sex workers, including Amrapali, Salabati, Sama, and Sulama.

In the book Durgapuja Paddhati from the Kalika Purana, Probirkumar Chattopadhyay described that among the ten types of clay used in Durga Puja, the soil from the doorstep of a professional sex worker's house is essential, because sex workers purify society.

At one time, the Bede women of Bangladesh were involved in sex work, although now most of them have converted to Islam. Medieval poet Mukundaram Chakraborty, while listing recognized professions in Bengal, mentioned the shuri (liquor-seller) and the barbonita (sex worker).

=== Nawabi era ===
The culture of baiji or tawaif in East Bengal first began to spread during the early part of the 17th century, under Subahdar Islam Khan's rule (1608–1613). Those who performed dance and music were called kanchani. The baijis entertained mainly through songs like khayal, thumri, tappa, ghazal, and dances like kathak. According to Satyen Sen, the baijis expressed the emotions of the songs through dance gestures and the expressions of their hands, faces, eyes, noses, and lips. These gatherings were known as mehfil or mujra. In these gatherings, the baijis wore peshwaz, churidar pajama, orhna, and fine ghungroos on their feet. They had their own safardar for managing them, playing instruments, and finding new clients.

Later, during the time of Dhaka's Naib Nazims—Nusrat Jang (1785–1822), Shamsuddaula (1822–1831), and Kamruddaula (1831–1836)—and also during the time of Nawabs of Dhaka—Abdul Ghani (1846–1896) and Khwaja Ahsanullah (1896–1901)—this culture developed further. During this time, many baijis from Kolkata and northern India began settling in Dhaka, and a permanent baiji neighborhood formed in the city. In the 18th century, Ghanaram Chakrabarti gave a long description of the cooking skills of barbonitas in his Dharmamangal poem.

=== Nineteenth century ===
In the 19th century in East Bengal, especially in riverine cities like Dhaka and Narayanganj, there was a significant presence of professional sex work. According to A Sketch of the Topography and Statistics of Dacca by James Taylor and The Elusive Intrigues: A Transnational Feminist Analysis of European Prostitution in Colonial Bombay by Dr. Ashwini Tambe, after 60% of British soldiers across India contracted venereal diseases, registration of sex workers (regulation system) began in 1864 under the Cantonment Act. According to Taylor, who served as Dhaka's Civil Surgeon from 1835 to 1885, organized sex work existed in Dhaka even in the first part of the 18th century.

Toward the end of the 19th century, some baijis became notable in the social and cultural life of Dhaka. Among them was Supanjan of Dhaka, wife of Sapan Khan, grandson of Mithun Khan, a famous singer and tabla player from Lucknow. In Nawab Ghani's court, performers like Piyari Bai, Hira Bai, and Wamu Bai regularly entertained. Other famous baijis in Dhaka included Batani, Jamurad, Panna, Himani, Amirjan, Rajlakshmi, Kani, and Absan. Additionally, occasionally baijis from Kolkata such as Malkajan Bulbuli, Malkajan Agarwali, Janaki Bai, Gauharjan, Jaddan Bai, and Harimoti came to Dhaka.

In the 1870s, at the garden house of Shahbagh in Dhaka, invited by Nawab Ghani, baiji Mushtari Bai sang and enchanted famous Urdu literary figures like Abdul Gafur Khan and Abdul Ghaffar Naskan. In Kolkata, her songs captivated Raichand Boral, Krishnachandra Dey, and Kazi Nazrul Islam. Rabindranath Tagore was also mesmerized when he heard her song on the radio.

During the Jhulan festival of the Hindu community, wealthy merchants regularly held mehfil events at their homes. From 1875, when Abdul Ghani received the title of Nawab, until the end of the 19th century, singers and dancers used to perform in Shahbagh's Nawabi palace every January. They were paid monthly salaries from the Nawab Estate.

In Dhaka Panchash Baras Pehle, Hakim Habibur Rahman mentioned three sisters—Annu, Gannu, and Nawabin—among whom Nawabin was the youngest and most famous. These three sisters were also involved in theater performances in Dhaka in the 1880s. In that same decade, Hakim Habibur Rahman described the tragic fate of another baiji in Shahbagh, named Elahijan.

=== 20th century ===
After the Partition of Bengal in 1905, several buildings in Dhaka, the capital of East Bengal, including Ishrat Manzil in Shahbagh, were built for entertainment purposes, which included arrangements for Baiji dance. Regular mujra performances were held at the Rangmahal of Ahsan Manzil, Ishrat Manzil, and the garden house of Dilkusha. Later, Nawab Salimullah selected the Ishrat Manzil building as the venue for the All India Muslim Education Conference on 14 and 15 April 1906. On 30 December 1906, the All India Muslim League was founded in this very building. Later, it was renovated and turned into the first international hotel in Dhaka. Currently, the building is part of Bangladesh Medical University, which was once known as the Institute of Postgraduate Medicine and Research (commonly known to the public as PG Hospital).

Among the Baijis who came to perform mujra in Dhaka, notable ones included Malka Jaan (a multilingual musical genius who composed 106 ghazals), Gauhar Jaan (Malka Jaan's daughter, who started the trend of changing clothes between dance performances and heavily influenced Kolkata fashion), Noorjahan, Siddheshwari, Janki Bai (Chhappan Chhuri), Jaddan Bai (disciple of Malka Jaan and mother of Indian film actress Nargis), Kohinoor, and Indubala. Among them, Gauhar Jaan (1873–1929) was the first artist in the Indian subcontinent to record her voice on a gramophone. Harimati became popular in the 1930s and 1940s by singing Nazrul Geeti on gramophone records. Another Baiji, Devi Bai, acted in Dhaka's first silent film, The Last Kiss (1931).

In the early 19th century, the patronage of the wealthy and the zamindar class turned the Baiji profession into a profitable one. According to the Dhaka Prakash newspaper published on 22 November 1903, a dancer's infant's rice-feeding ceremony cost 25,000 taka, at a time when one maund (approx. 37 kg) of rice cost only four taka. In 1874, when Nawab Abdul Ghani called for contributions to establish a clean water supply in Dhaka, Baijis Rajlakshmi and Amirjan were the first to respond, donating 500 taka each. Although Baijis often enjoyed financial stability and high social positions, they regularly faced obstacles in terms of social recognition and forming family relationships. Noorjahan, the most renowned Baiji of the royal court of the Maharaja of Tripura, retired at the age of 40–42 and lived on land given by the Maharaja in the village of Majhigachha, Comilla. Though she built a mosque there, the local Muslims have refused to pray in the "prostitute's mosque" to this day.

In his book Abidyar Antopur: Nishiddho Palli'r Antorongo Kathokota, Dr. Abul Ahsan Chowdhury described that the writer Mir Mosharraf Hossain mentioned visiting brothels in his diary. The mystic poet Hasan Raja and novelist Sarat Chandra Chattopadhyay used to visit red-light areas regularly. Sex worker Sukumari Dutta captivated Jyotirindranath Tagore. Sukumari Dutta, the first female playwright in Bengali literature and the first female actress, was one of the four women performers of Bengal Theatre. Her stage name was Golap Sundari. The other three were Jagattarini, Elokeshi, and Shyama. All of them were sex workers by profession. Later, she performed under the name Sukumari in the Great National Theatre and the Emerald Theatre.

== Policy and law ==
Prostitution is legal in Bangladesh under the law, but it is regulated. Bangladesh is one of the few Muslim-majority countries in the world where prostitution is legal for women aged 18 or older. However, the Constitution of Bangladesh shows a clear opposition to professional sex work. In Part II, Article 18 of the Constitution of Bangladesh, it is stated, "The State shall adopt effective measures to prevent prostitution and gambling."

Although the Constitution calls for discouragement of prostitution and taking effective steps to end the profession, the law allows any woman aged 18 or older to choose sex work as a profession by declaring it in court. Bangladesh is one of the few countries in the world where professional sex work is both legal and illegal at the same time.

In 1999, in response to eviction attempts against the Tanbazar and Nimtoli brothels, 100 sex workers filed a writ petition in the High Court with the support of the Bangladesh Human Rights Implementation Organization. In its 2000 verdict, the court declared professional sex work as legal. The judgment stated that if a female sex worker is under 18 and can prove that sex work is her only source of income, then she can legally participate in the profession. The judgment also stated that the government's initiative to evict the brothels was illegal.

In the verdict of the case State vs. Bangladesh Human Rights Implementation Organization (2000), it was further stated that the constitutional rights to life, livelihood, and legal protection also apply to sex workers, and depriving them of their right to livelihood is illegal. The High Court also stated that although operating brothels and engaging minors in sex work are prohibited under the Suppression of Immoral Traffic Act of 1933 (also known as the Prostitution Act) and the Penal Code of 1860, professional sex work itself is not prohibited by any law.

Although professional female sex work is legal, professional male sex work is illegal, even though it is practiced in various places.

=== Registration ===
To work as a sex worker, an interested woman must register. Before registration, she has to appear in court and submit an affidavit through a notary public to a first-class magistrate to obtain a permit. In this affidavit, she must declare that she is unable to find any other profession, has no other means of subsistence, and has no one to support her, so she has voluntarily chosen this livelihood. Moreover, no party has influenced or pressured her to choose this profession. Rather, she has chosen sex work as a profession by her own decision, without any coercion. After that, she must collect a certificate confirming her consent to this profession.

Also, no woman under the age of 18 can choose this profession. Forcing anyone into this profession is a punishable offense. There are allegations that even to voluntarily choose this profession, one has to pay at least 20,000 taka in bribes to the police. Although police sometimes rescue minors from brothels, there is little to no initiative regarding floating sex workers. Authorities often ignore the minimum age requirement (18 years) for sex workers and allegedly register them using false ages. Even though many children are used in sex work in brothels, those who employ them in this profession are rarely held accountable.

=== Penal code ===
- Section 290 - (offence affecting the public health, safety, convenience, decency and morals) Whoever commits a public nuisance in any case not otherwise punishable by this code, shall be punished with fine.
- Section 364A – Whoever kidnaps or abducts any person under the age of ten in order that such a person may be or subjected to slavery or to the lust of any person shall be punished with death or with imprisonment for life or for rigorous imprisonment for a term which may extend to 14 years and may not be less than 7 years.
- Section 366A – Whoever, by any means whatsoever, induces any minor girl under the age of eighteen years to go from any place or to do any act with the intent that such a girl may be or knowing that it is likely that she will be forced or seduced to illicit intercourse with another person shall be punishable with imprisonment which may extend to 10 years and shall also be liable to fine.
- Section 373 – Whoever buys, hires or otherwise obtains possession of any person under the age of eighteen years with the intent that such person shall at any age be employed or used for the purpose of prostitution or illicit intercourse with any person or knowing it likely that such person will at any age be employed or used for such purpose with imprisonment of either description for a term which may extend 10 years and fine. Any prostitute or any person keeping or managing a brothel, who buys, hires or otherwise obtains possession of a female under the age of 18 years, shall until the contrary is proved, be presumed to have obtained possession of such female with the intent that she shall be used for the purpose of prostitution.

=== Prevention and Suppression of Human Trafficking Act ===
- Section 12 - If any person keeps or manages or assists or participates actively in the keeping or management of a brothel shall be deemed to have committed an offence and shall for the offence be punished with rigorous imprisonment for a term not exceeding five years but not less than three years and with a fine of not less than taka 20,000.
- Section 13 - If any person in any street or public place or from within any house or building, by words, gestures, or indecent personal exposure attracts the attention of any other person for the purpose of prostitution he shall be deemed to have committed and offence and shall for the offence, be punished with rigorous imprisonment for a term not exceeding three years or with a fine of not less than taka 20,000 or with both.

== Society ==
In Bangladesh, professional sex work is one of the most socially hated professions, and sex workers are frequently subjected to social harassment. Police forces often carry out raids against illegal prostitution in various places, especially in hotels, and arrest both sex workers and their clients and send them to court.

Although many sex workers are registered voters, they receive almost no civic benefits. As they grow older, many of them face severe problems. Even during elections, they are marked separately and made to vote in a separate line. At one time, sex workers were not even allowed to wear shoes.

Traditionally, after the death of a sex worker, only their fellow workers are allowed to touch the body. It is socially prohibited to bury them in a public cemetery. So usually, their bodies are either buried informally or floated in river water. Religious leaders in Bangladesh have long strongly opposed performing the Janāzah (Islamic funeral rites) for sex workers due to their "immoral" profession.

On February 6, 2020, for the first time, after the death of Hamida Begum, a sex worker from the Daulatdia brothel, a Janāzah was held according to religious customs with the help of NGOs and the Goalondo police station, breaking the usual tradition. Around 200 people attended her Janāzah. Later, about 400 more people joined the Milad Mahfil and Kulkhani (memorial prayers). However, for leading this Janāzah, Golam Mostafa, the Imam of the Daulatdia Railway Station Mosque, was socially harassed and later decided not to perform any more funeral prayers for sex workers. Despite this, in the presence of local police administration, he led the Janāzah prayers for two more sex workers named Rina Begum and Parvin on 20 and 22 February of the same year.

Sex workers in Bangladesh often suffer from extreme poverty. There is no government initiative for healthcare in the brothel areas. Instead, healthcare and medical services are provided by various private service organizations including PIACT Bangladesh. When seeking treatment at external hospitals, sex workers have to hide their real names and identities.

After primary education, there is hardly any opportunity for sex workers' children to pursue further education. Schools outside the brothels do not want to admit them. Though some manage to get their children admitted to outside schools by hiding their identity. When trying to admit children to school, get medical services, open a bank account, collect death certificates, or join alternative professions, people in society look down on them because their ID cards mention the brothel. For this reason, the name "Daulatdia Brothel" was changed in national ID cards. As a result, around 5,500 residents, including sex workers, are now officially recognized as residents of "Daulatdia Bazar Purbo Para" instead of "Daulatdia Brothel."

== Expansion ==
In Bangladesh, generally three types of sex workers are seen: hotel-based, floating in parks and gardens, and brothel-based. Despite various restrictions, the number of professional sex workers in Bangladesh continues to increase. The main reasons for entering this profession include poverty, unemployment, increasing urban migration of unmarried young women for low-paying jobs, and family breakdown. About two-thirds of Bangladesh's professional sex workers come from families of agricultural laborers, small farmers, fishermen, etc., and the rest often come from low-income families of rickshaw or cart pullers, boatmen, etc. Nowadays, even women from solvent families are seen in this profession.

In 1901, according to government records, there were 2,164 sex workers in Dhaka. According to estimates by some local NGOs in Bangladesh, at the beginning of the 21st century, there were about 100,000 registered sex workers in Bangladesh. According to the Sex Workers Network of Bangladesh, in 2017 there were 25,000 floating and 70,000 legal sex workers in brothels across the country. In 2020, according to their data, although their list included over 65,000 sex workers, the total number in the country was more than 100,000. According to government statistics from 2015 to 2016, there were about 102,000 sex workers in Bangladesh. It is also estimated that the total number of female sex workers, both legal and illegal, is around 500,000. According to Save the Children, in 2014, 5 percent of sex workers were in hotels, 41 percent were floating, and 54 percent were in brothels.

According to UNICEF, 10,000 children are involved in professional sex work. A survey by the NGO Development Research revealed that there are currently about 400,000 street children or "tokai", half of whom live on the streets of Dhaka. Among the girls living on the streets, 19% are forced into sex work. According to Advocate Fahima Nasrin Munni, vice-president of the Bangladesh National Women Lawyers Association, in 2014 at least 20,000 young girls across the country were engaged in prostitution on the streets. According to the Sex Workers Network, many of Bangladesh's professional sex workers are under 18, a large portion of whom are forced into the profession. Although the law requires an adult woman to declare in court to engage in professional sex work, it is not followed. On one hand, the number of those entering the profession by declaration is very low. On the other hand, brokers present children or teenagers as adults in court. Police are also involved in this. According to the Government of Bangladesh, women and children become professional sex workers due to abuse, trafficking, deception, abduction, birth in brothels, etc. One of the reasons for the demand for younger sex workers is that clients believe the risk of sexually transmitted diseases is lower with children and teenagers compared to adults. Moreover, they can be used more easily and at will. In 2003, the Government of Bangladesh established the "Training and Rehabilitation Center for Socially Handicapped Girls" for rescued underage sex workers.

== Child prostitution ==
Child prostitution is widespread and a serious problem. The majority of Bangladeshi prostituted children are based in brothels, with a smaller number of children exploited in hotel rooms, parks, railway and bus stations and rented flats.

The UN Children's Fund (UNICEF) estimated in 2004 that there were 10,000 underage girls used in commercial sexual exploitation in the country, but other estimates placed the figure as high as 29,000.

Many girls involved in child labour, such as working in factories and as domestic workers are raped or sexually exploited; these girls are highly stigmatised and many of them flee to escape such abuse, but often they find that survival sex is the only option open to them—once involved with prostitution they become even more marginalised.

More than 20,000 children are born and live in the 18 registered red-light areas of Bangladesh. Boys tend to become pimps once they grow up and girls continue in their mothers' profession. Most of these girls enter the profession before the age of 12.

Disabled children who live in institutions and children displaced as a result of natural disasters such as floods are highly susceptible to commercial sexual exploitation.

Girls are often sold by their families to brothels for a period of two to three years of bonded sex work. Visits to the brothels of Faridpur and Tangail in 2010 revealed that most sex workers there take or are made to take the steroid drug dexamethasone to gain weight and to look better.

The authorities generally ignore the minimum age of 18, often circumvented by false statements of age, for legal female prostitution; the government rarely prosecutes procurers of minors.

== Sex trafficking ==
Bangladesh is a source, transit, and destination country for women and children subjected to sex trafficking. Women and girls who migrate for domestic work are particularly vulnerable to abuse.

It is estimated by government sources and Border Security Forces that 50,000 Bangladeshi women and children aged between 12 and 30 are trafficked to India annually. Many of the girls end up in the red-light districts of Kolkata in West Bengal while others are sold to work in brothels, hotels and massage parlours across India in cities such as Delhi, Mumbai and Pune.

Some women who migrate through Bangladeshi recruitment agencies to Lebanon or Jordan for domestic work are sold and transported to Syria and subjected to sex trafficking. Some women and children are subjected to sex trafficking in India and Pakistan.

With nearly 700,000 Rohingya fleeing Burma for Bangladesh since August 2017, Bangladesh is host to more than 1 million undocumented Rohingya, including hundreds of thousands who fled Burma in previous decades. The Rohingya community's stateless status and inability to work legally increases their vulnerability to human trafficking. Rohingya women and girls are reportedly recruited from refugee camps for domestic work in private homes, guest houses, or hotels and are instead subjected to sex trafficking. Rohingya girls are also reportedly transported within Bangladesh to Chittagong and Dhaka and transnationally to Kathmandu and Kolkata and subjected to sex trafficking.

Unwed mothers, orphans, and others outside the normal family support system are the most vulnerable to human trafficking. Government corruption greatly facilitates the process of trafficking. Police and local government officials often ignore trafficking in women and children for commercial sexual exploitation and are easily bribed by brothel owners and pimps. Women and children are trafficked both internally and internationally. International criminal gangs conduct some of the trafficking; the border with India is loosely controlled, especially around Jessore and Benapole, which makes illegal border crossings easy.

Police estimate more than 15,000 women and children are smuggled out of Bangladesh every year. Bangladesh and Nepal are the main sources of trafficked children in South Asia. Bangladeshi women and girls are forced into the brothels of India, Pakistan, Malaysia, UAE and other Asian countries.

The United States Department of State Office to Monitor and Combat Trafficking in Persons ranks Bangladesh as a 'Tier 2 Watch List' country.

=== Methods and techniques of trafficking ===
The Constitution states that each individual is entitled to choose his/her own profession/occupation or trade. Taking advantage of the vulnerability of the poverty-stricken or opportunity seeking people, traffickers either coerce, entice, lure or sell minors and other gullible persons into prostitution. They make them execute affidavits in front of false magistrates/impersonators stating that they have gone into prostitution of their own volition and they are over 18 years old. Forms of trafficking include fake marriages, sale by parents to "uncles" offering jobs, auctions to brothel owners or farmers, and abduction. Traffickers and procurers pose as prospective husbands to impoverished families. They take the girls away and sell them into prostitution. A large number of "brides" have been collected in this manner and brought as a group to Pakistan where they are handed over to local traffickers.

Coalition Against Trafficking in Women – Bangladesh, which comprises 40 organisations, is working on this issue.

== Red-light areas ==
Although professional sex work is legally permitted in Bangladesh, to regulate it, sex workers must register their names and are restricted to living in designated areas. These residential areas are referred to as Notipara, Beshyapara, or Nishiddho Palli (forbidden zones). Currently, there are 14 government-approved registered brothels or red-light districts in Bangladesh. Of these, 7 are in the Dhaka Division, 6 in the Khulna Division, and 1 in the Barisal Division. Daulatdia red-light district, Kandu Patti, Tanbazar red-light district, Sandhyabazar red-light district, and Ganginapara red-light district, along with the now-defunct red-light district in Chittagong's Sadarghat, are some of the well-known red-light areas in Bangladesh. During the 2020 lockdown caused by the coronavirus in Bangladesh, the government provided food and financial aid to 11 of these red-light districts, although it was deemed insufficient.

=== Evictions ===
In the mid-20th century, under the initiative of Muslim League leaders, a wave of red-light district evictions began in what was then East Pakistan. In independent Bangladesh, since 1980, several red-light districts have been evicted, including those in Dhaka's Kumartuli, Gangajali, and Patuatuli, as well as Narayanganj's Tanbazar, Magura, Madaripur, Tangail, and Phultala. Among these, sex workers in Narayanganj's Tanbazar, English Road in Dhaka, Madaripur, Phultala in Khulna, and Tangail were beaten and tortured before being evicted overnight. Reports indicate that local influential figures carried out these actions with the help of the administration. Many sex workers were detained and sent to vagrant centers in prison vans. Many others have now become floating sex workers. There have been multiple eviction attempts in Jamalpur, Patuakhali, Mymensingh, Faridpur C&B Ghat and Rothkhola, and Bagerhat red-light districts. Additionally, several other red-light districts in Bangladesh, including Banishanta, are under threat.

According to data from the Sex Workers Network, 8 red-light districts have been recently evicted. In the early 1980s, three red-light districts in Dhaka — Kumartuli, Gangajali, and Patuatuli — were evicted. Later, Tanbazar in Narayanganj (1999), Magura (2003), Madaripur (2013), Tangail (2014), and Phultala (2015) were also evicted. Red-light districts in Jamalpur, Patuakhali, Mymensingh, Faridpur C&B Ghat and Rothkhola, and Bagerhat are facing eviction attempts and threats to life. There are allegations that red-light districts are being evicted under the guise of religion in order to grab the land. Further allegations suggest that even though legal cases were filed regarding these evictions, the administration did not provide any assistance. Some of the evicted red-light districts have now turned into multi-storied markets. A few red-light districts have been re-established through legal battles.

In 1985, an eviction campaign against Tanbazar red-light district failed following the murder of underage Shabmeher. In October 1991, another eviction attempt was thwarted due to a dispute between the ruling Bangladesh Nationalist Party and the Jatiya Party over extortion from the Tanbazar red-light district. There are allegations that the murders of student leader Tibet in Kandu Patti, labor leader Ayub in Banishanta, and sex worker Jesmin in Tanbazar were politically motivated. Before independence, in Chittagong, Fazlul Quader Chowdhury evicted the red-light district in the Riazuddin Bazar area by mobilizing local Muslims to defeat district Muslim League president Rafiquddin Siddiqui in a political and economic power struggle.

=== District-based brothels ===
==== Comilla district ====
During World War II, to meet the needs of the large number of foreign soldiers assembled at the Comilla Cantonment, another brothel was established beside the one in Comilla city, near the Gauripur market of Daudkandi.

==== Chittagong district ====
The brothel in Sahebpara, Chittagong, located on the bank of the Karnaphuli River, is about 300 years old. At one time, the brothel in the port city of Chittagong was located in the area that is now Riazuddin Bazar. After the market was established, there were about 1,500 to 2,000 sex workers there. Whenever ships docked at the Chittagong port, sailors would come ashore looking for the brothel. During the Pakistani era, the brothel was evicted but was later re-established at Majhir Ghat near the port. However, that too has since been removed.

==== Jessore district ====
The history of the brothel in Jessore city is 500 years old. Since the time of Mughal Emperor Akbar, the brothel was thriving. During the British era, there were three brothels there. Zamindar Manmathanath Roy regularly came from Kolkata for entertainment. It is known that sex workers for him came from Brahmin families of the Ray Para in Chanchra. Currently, in Jessore city, about 120 sex workers reside in two brothels located in the Jhalaipatti and Marwari Temple areas.

==== Khulna district ====
In the brothel at Banisanta, located in Dakop Upazila of Khulna District, there are about 90 sex workers. Also, in 2020, there were 65 children and 70 men living there. The brothel was established more than a hundred years ago on the bank of the Poshur River, near the Mongla seaport. In 2019, the Primary Education Office decided to provide clothes, educational materials, and monthly cash support to 50 children living in this brothel so they could attend school. A gathering of the mothers from the brothel was held at Banisanta Dhangmari Government Primary School as part of this initiative. In 2020, most of the houses in the brothel were destroyed by Cyclone Amphan.

==== Bagerhat district ====
About 40 sex workers live in the brothel near Ghoshpatti in Bagerhat town. In 2020, their 44 children were also living there.

==== Dhaka district ====
Among the brothels in various parts of Dhaka, Gangajali and Sanchibandar were famous. The road from the Islampur and Patuatuli junction toward the Buriganga River, which is now called Waisghat, was once named Gangajali. Playwright Saeed Ahmed wrote that Gangajali was a wide two-storey house near Mahesh Bhattacharya's homeopathy medicine shop and opposite the Kali temple. The attendants of the baijis (courtesans) lived on the ground floor. The baijis stayed on the upper floor, which was accessible by a curved staircase. Their private rooms were decorated with luxury. There were rooms with mattresses on the floor and easy chairs on the verandah. Most of the baijis of Gangajali were Vaishnavas. Every morning, in groups, they would bathe in the Buriganga, with towels wrapped around their chests and brass pitchers on their waists, returning in wet clothes. This scene was described by Saeed Ahmed and artist Paritosh Sen.

Since 1980, the brothels of Kumartuli, Gangajali, and Patuatuli in Dhaka have been removed. There were also brothels in Kandukpatti and English Road in Dhaka city.

==== Narayanganj district ====
In the river port of Narayanganj, there was a large brothel in Tanbazar. After the Awami League came to power in 1996, Awami League leader Shamim Osman evicted the sex workers from Tanbazar, and they spread across the streets of the city. They carried out movements and protests. Besides this nearly 200-year-old brothel, the Nimtala brothel of Narayanganj was also evicted at the same time.

In 1985, in the Daulat Khan building of Tanbazar brothel, a 12–13-year-old girl named Shabmeher from a village in Narsingdi was tortured—beaten and given electric shocks—to force her into prostitution. She was left near death on the street outside Tanbazar by the accused owner Momtaz Mia and the female pimp (sardarni). When people on the street took her to Dhaka Medical College, she died in Ward 35. The incident created a huge stir among people. Writer Imdadul Haq Milan wrote the novel Top based on her death, and singer Fakir Alamgir gave voice to a song written by poet Rudra Mohammad Shahidullah. Based on the poem Shabmeher Tomar Jonno by Jahanara Arju, a short film was made by Ismail Hossain.

==== Rajbari district ====
The brothel at Daulatdia Ghat is the largest in the country and the second-largest in South Asia. It is one of the largest brothels in the world. A huge number of women and children are used there every day to serve around 5,000 clients. About 1,500 registered sex workers live there. Although it is said to have been established around 1988, professional sex work had been present in Daulatdia for a long time before that.

==== Faridpur district ====
In Faridpur town, there are brothels in Rathkhola, near Haji Shariatullah Bazar, and in the C and B Ghat area of Decreer Char Union. According to government records, around 300 sex workers live there. According to non-government sources, this number could be twice as high.

==== Tangail district ====
In the past, one of the country's largest baiji neighborhoods was in Hemnagar Bazar, Gopalpur Upazila of Tangail. People went there not only for sexual pleasure but also to enjoy the music and dance of talented baijis.

Currently, the Kandapara brothel in Tangail town is the second-largest brothel in the country. After being evicted once, a movement took place to reopen it. After reopening, it now has 800 registered sex workers, many of whom appear to be underage. At first glance, the Tangail brothel looks like an ordinary slum. It is guarded with thick sticks. The open drains of the brothel are clogged with discarded condoms.

==== Mymensingh district ====
In Ganginapar of Mymensingh, the old brothel from British times has around 300 sex workers. In addition, in 2020, about a thousand people including sex workers and their family members lived in 10 houses (both government and privately owned) in the Ganginapar brothel.

==== Jamalpur district ====
In 2020, the Raniganj brothel of Jamalpur had 97 active sex workers, 50 elderly women, and 2 guards according to government records. According to non-government sources, there were over 200 sex workers. The brothel has 9 buildings with 174 rooms, each housing one sex worker.

==== Patuakhali district ====
There are about 200 rooms in the brothel of Patuakhali. In 2020, 130 sex workers and a total of 200 people including madams and children lived there.

== HIV/AIDS ==
According to non-governmental organizations, prostitutes and their clients are most at risk from HIV due to ignorance and lack of public information about unprotected sex.

== See also ==
- Human trafficking in Bangladesh
- Prostitution in Asia
- Prostitution in Europe
- Prostitution in the Americas
- Male prostitution in Bangladesh
