= N710 (Bangladesh) =

Highway in Bangladesh

N710
- Upper Jashore Road

Route information
- Length: 0.4 km (0.25 mi; 1,300 ft)

Major junctions
- From: N7 - Ferry Ghat More
- To: Lower Jashore road from Dak Bungalow More

Location
- Country: Bangladesh

Highway system
- Roads in Bangladesh
← N709	→ N711

The N710 or Upper Jashore Road is a National Highway in Bangladesh. It is the shortest listed highway by length in Bangladesh. This road goes through a busiest commercial area of Khulna City.
