= N706 (Bangladesh) =

National Highway in Bangladesh

N706
- Jessore–Benapole Highway; Jessore Road

Route information
- Part of AH1
- Length: 38 km (24 mi)

Major junctions
- From: N702 / N707 in Daratana, Jessore
- N7 in Chanchra; N765 in Navaron
- To: NH 112 at Benapole Border Crossing

Location
- Country: Bangladesh

Highway system
- Roads in Bangladesh
← N705	→ N707

The N706 or Jessore–Benapole highway or historically known as Jessore Road is a National Highway in Bangladesh. It connects Doratana, Jessore (Jessore zero point) to Benapole Border Crossing at the international border with India where it meets with NH 112. The road from Daratana in Jashore City to the bypass intersection is called Mujib Road and from the bypass intersection to Benapole is called Jashore Road or Benapole Road. The length of the road is 38.20 km or 23.74 miles.

== History ==
The British govt built this road to increase connectivity to Jashore with Kolkata. In 1971 this road plays major role to War of Independence Bangladesh.
