= R745 (Bangladesh) =

R745
- Kushtia–Meherpur Regional Highway; Meherpur–Chuadanga Regional Highway; Chuadanga–Jhenaidah Regional Highway

Route information
- Length: 116.813 km (72.584 mi)

Major junctions
- Kushtia end: N704 (Trimohoni)
- Jhenaidah end: N703 (Paira Chottor)

Location
- Country: Bangladesh
- Major cities: Mirpur, Gangni, Meherpur, Chuadanga, Jhenaidah

Highway system
- Roads in Bangladesh
← N704	→ N703

R745 regional highway connects the four cities of Khulna Division of Bangladesh: Kushtia, Meherpur, Chuadanga and Jhenaidah.
