= Jessore =

City in Bangladesh

Jashore যশোর Jessore
- City & Municipality
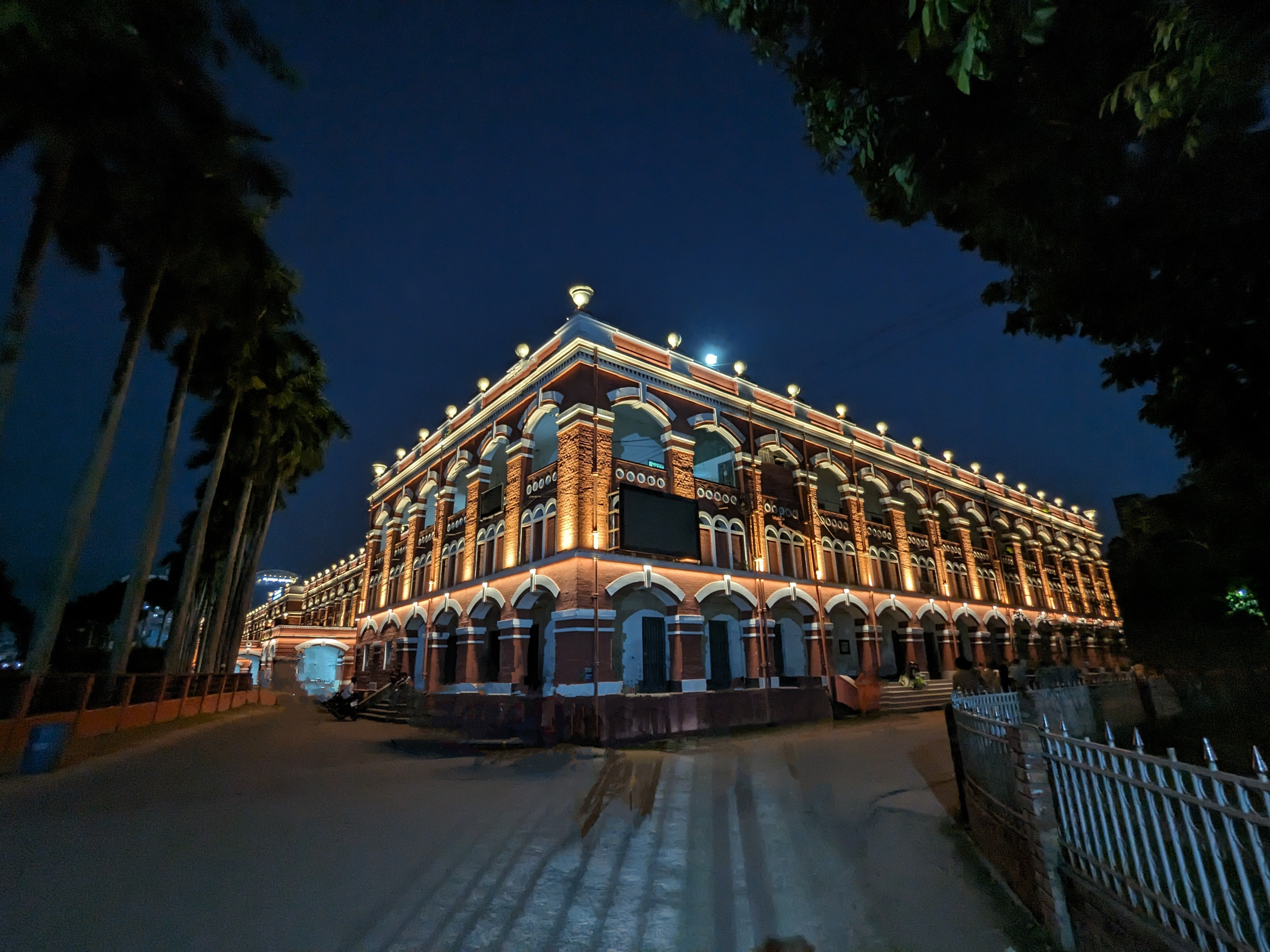
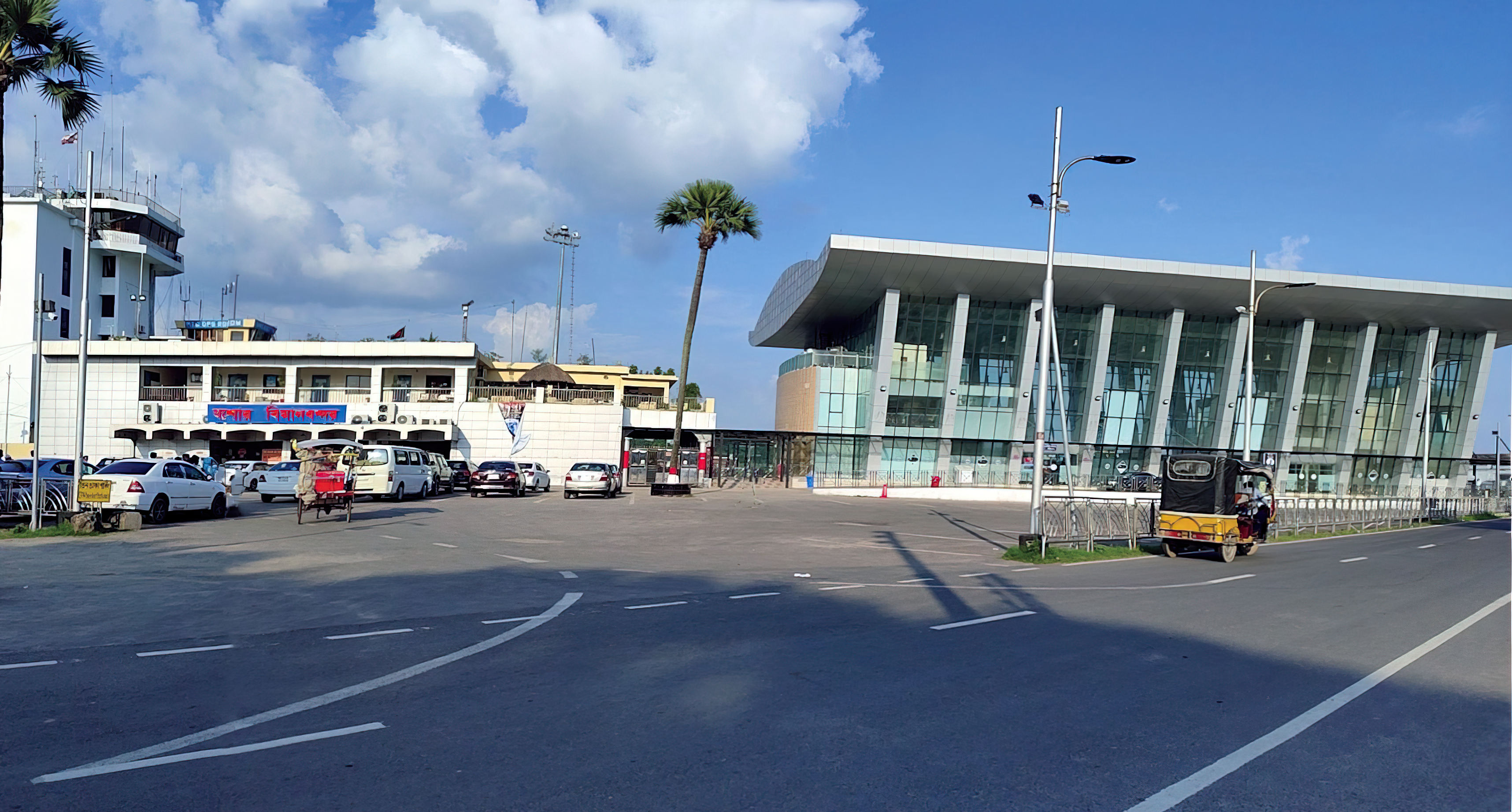
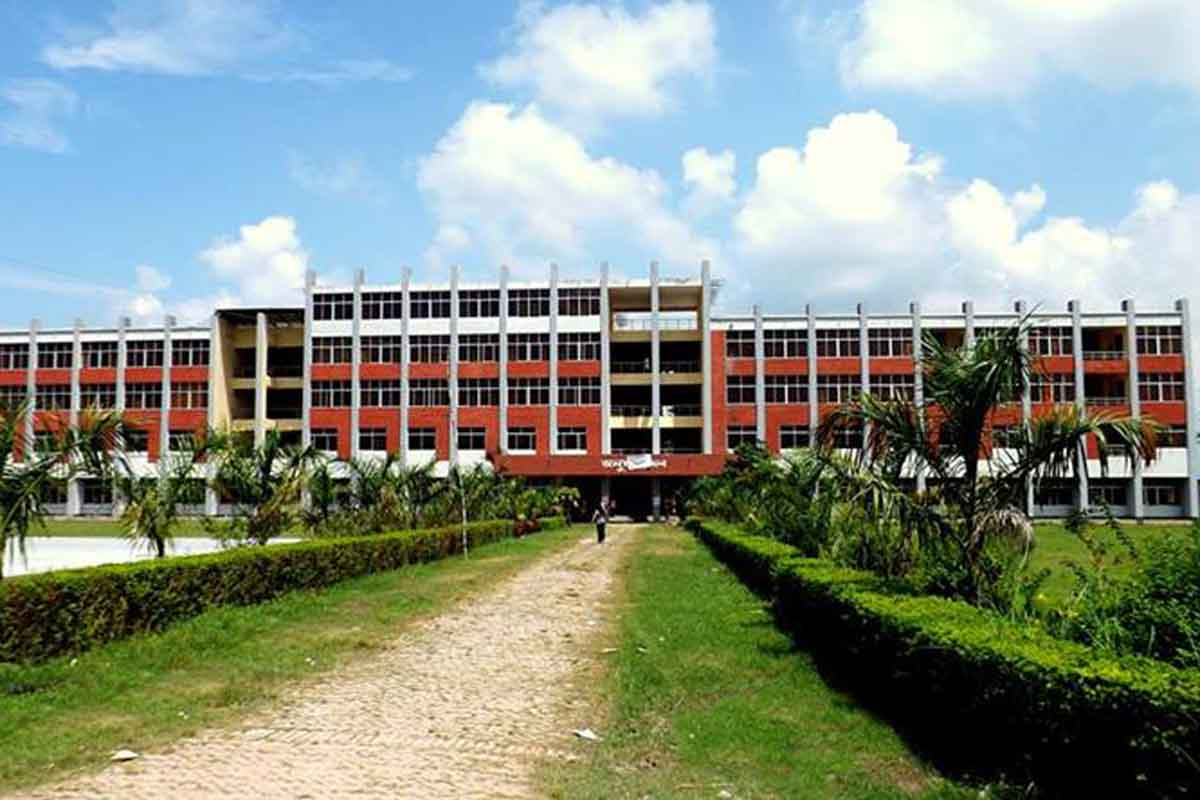
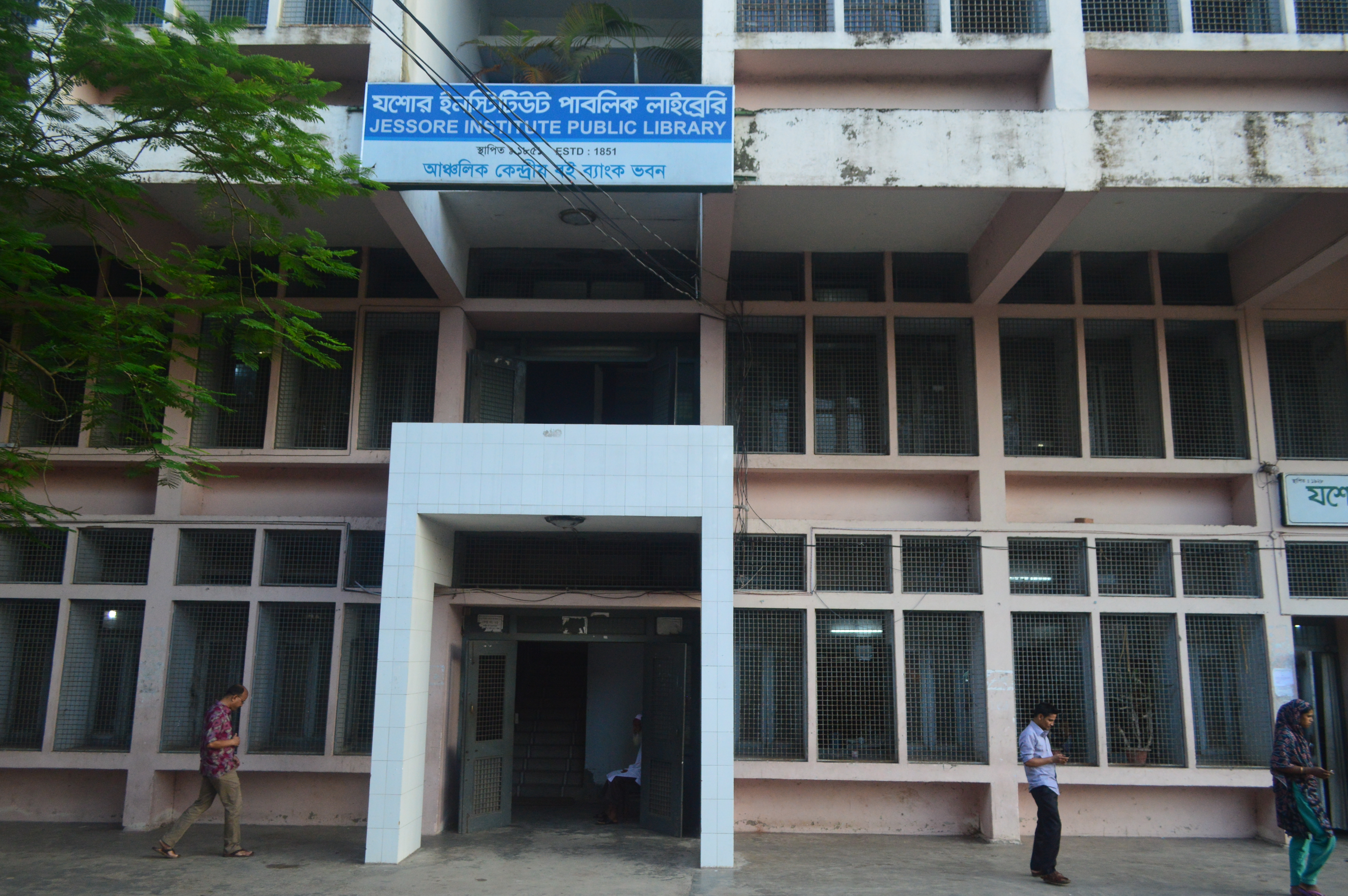
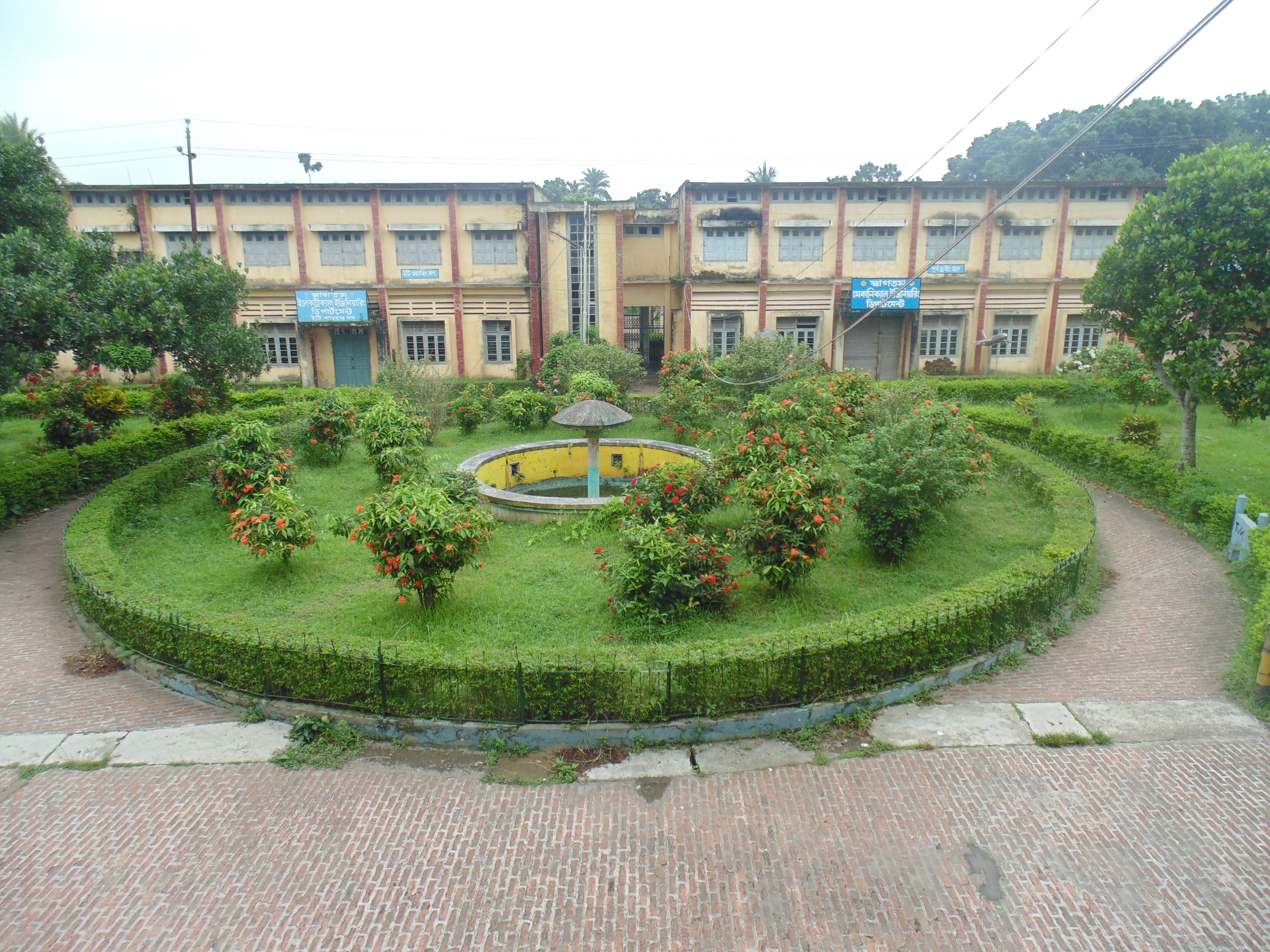
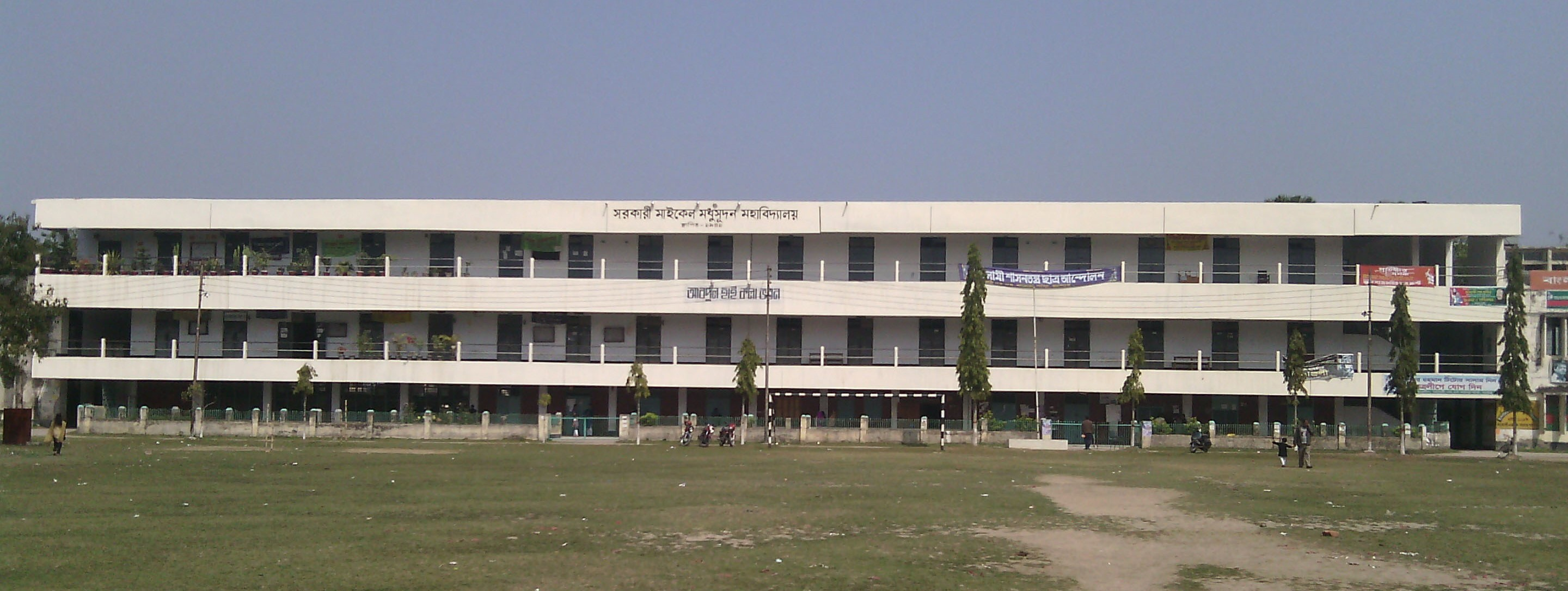
- Clockwise for top: Jashore Collectorate Building, Jessore Airport, academic building of Jashore University of Science and Technology, Jashore Institute Public Library, Jessore Polytechnic Institute, Michael Madhusudan College

- Location within Khulna division Location within Bangladesh
- Coordinates: 23°10′01″N 89°12′32″E
- Country: Bangladesh
- Division: Khulna
- District: Jessore
- Upazila: Jessore Sadar
- Established: 1450 (576 years ago)
- Municipality: 13 July 1864 (162 years ago)
- Named for: Jeshoreshwari Kali Temple

Government
  - Type: Mayor-Council
  - Body: Jashore Municipality
  - Mayor: Vacant

Area
  - Total: 21.15 km^{2} (8.17 sq mi)
- Elevation: 6 m (20 ft)

Population (2022)
  - Total: 209,352
  - Rank: 13th
  - Density: 9,898/km^{2} (25,640/sq mi)
- Demonym: Jashorie or Jessoree
- Time zone: UTC+6 (BST)
- Postal Code: 7400–7409
- IDD : Calling Code Jessore Municipality mahallah geocode map: +880 (0)421
- Languages: Standard Bengali (Official)
- Police: Bangladesh Police
- Airport: Jessore Airport
- Literacy rate: 63.08 (2023)

Jessore (Bengali: যশোর, romanized: jôshor, [dʒɔʃor]), officially Jashore, (Note: The spelling of the district name in the Latin script was officially changed from Jessore to Jashore in April 2018.) is a city of Jessore District in Khulna Division. It lies in southwestern Bangladesh. It is home to the first flight training school of the Bangladeshi Air Force, established in 1971. Jashore city consists of 9 wards and 73 mahalls. Jashore municipality was established in 1864. The area of the town is 21.15 km^{2}. It has a population of about 209,330 according to the record of Jashore municipality, which makes it the 22nd largest city in Bangladesh. Jashore also has a domestic airport known as Jashore Airport.

== Etymology ==
The present-day city of Jashore was originally known as Kasba. The current name was originally acquired from the name of the surrounding pargana and zamindari estate of Jashore, or Jesar, when Kasba became its capital. The district's name was also applied to its two previous capitals, which are now known as Ishwaripur and Murali, respectively, so early mentions of jashore are not referring to the modern town.

The name "Jashore" is traditionally explained as a derivation from the Sanskrit name Yaśohara, meaning "glory-depriving". The name originally applied to the town now called Ishwaripur, which was founded sometime after 1573-74 by Vikramaditya, father of Pratapaditya. According to J. Westland, "glory-depriving" may have been used in the sense of "so glorious that it makes other cities seem humble in comparison". An inscription at Kanhaynagar records a similar epithet for that place: ruchira-ruchi-hara, or "depriving of beauty that which is beautiful".

== History ==
The Ain-i Akbari lists a pargana of Jesar as part of sarkar Khalifatabad. This Jesar is a reference to today's Ishwaripur. Ishwaripur is also the Jesar mentioned in the Bahāristān-i Ghaibī. The zamindars of Jesar later shifted their capital to Murali and then to nearby Kasba, and the name "Jessore" was transferred to each of them in succession. One or both of these shifts had happened by around 1660, when Mattheus van den Broucke's map of Bengal shows a "Jessoor" in the same spot as today's city; however, because Murali and Kasba are so close together, it's uncertain which one specifically is being shown here.

It was the capital of Pratapaditya, the one and only Hindu ruler of the 12 Bhuiyas of Bengal, who had also famously fought against Mughal intrusion in East Bengal. He was defeated by Mughal forces and his territories were annexed into the Mughal Empire.

It was the first district to be freed and taken back by Bengali rule in the Liberation War, on 8 December 1971.

== Demographics ==
Religions in Jashore Paurashava (2022)
Religion	Percent
Islam	88.26%
Hinduism	11.36%
Other or not stated	0.38%

According to the 2022 Bangladesh census, Jashore Paurashava had 53,733 households and a population of 209,352. Jashore had a literacy rate of 87.31%: 89.07% for males and 85.50% for females, and a sex ratio of 103.34 males per 100 females. 7.53% of the population was under 5 years of age.

According to the 2011 Bangladesh census, Jessore city had 45,930 households and a population of 201,796. 33,717 (16.71%) were under 10 years of age. Jessore had a literacy rate (age 7 and over) of 76.44%, compared to the national average of 51.8%, and a sex ratio of 926 females per 1000 males.

== Education ==
- Jashore University of Science and Technology
- Jashore Medical College
- Army Medical College, Jessore
- Cantonment College, Jashore
- Jashore Government city college
- Jashore Govt. Mahila College
- Michael Madhusudan College
- BAF Shaheen College Jashore
- Jessore Zilla School
- Police Line Secondary School,Jashore

== Transport ==
The city is the transport hub of the district and southern Bangladesh.

To the north it is connected by national highway N7 to Jhenaidah, about 50 kilometres (31 mi) away. N702 runs northeast 45 kilometres (28 mi) to Magura. To the east it is connected by national highway N806 to Narail, about 32 kilometres (20 mi) away. N7 continues southeast to divisional headquarters Khulna, about 55 kilometres (34 mi) away. Regional highway R755 runs south 45 kilometres (28 mi) to Chuknagar on the N760 between Satkhira and Khulna. N706 runs west to Benapole, 37 kilometres (23 mi) away, on the border with India.

Jessore Junction railway station is on the main line connecting Darshana and Khulna. In July 2023, it was served by between 8 and 12 intercity trains a day.

Jessore Airport served over 19 thousand passengers in December 2022. It is located in the western part of the city, 7 kilometres (4.3 mi) from downtown, and maintains scheduled passenger flights to Dhaka.

== Climate ==
Climate data for Jessore (1991–2020, extremes 1867-present)
Month	Jan	Feb	Mar	Apr	May	Jun	Jul	Aug	Sep	Oct	Nov	Dec	Year
Record high °C (°F)	31.2 (88.2)	37.8 (100.0)	41.0 (105.8)	43.8 (110.8)	43.2 (109.8)	41.8 (107.2)	37.8 (100.0)	38.2 (100.8)	37.6 (99.7)	38.6 (101.5)	34.4 (93.9)	31.6 (88.9)	43.8 (110.8)
Mean daily maximum °C (°F)	25.3 (77.5)	29.1 (84.4)	33.5 (92.3)	35.8 (96.4)	35.8 (96.4)	34.3 (93.7)	32.9 (91.2)	33.0 (91.4)	33.2 (91.8)	32.8 (91.0)	30.5 (86.9)	26.7 (80.1)	31.9 (89.4)
Daily mean °C (°F)	17.1 (62.8)	21.3 (70.3)	26.0 (78.8)	29.2 (84.6)	29.9 (85.8)	29.6 (85.3)	29.0 (84.2)	29.0 (84.2)	28.8 (83.8)	27.3 (81.1)	23.1 (73.6)	18.5 (65.3)	25.7 (78.3)
Mean daily minimum °C (°F)	10.8 (51.4)	14.6 (58.3)	19.5 (67.1)	23.6 (74.5)	25.2 (77.4)	26.1 (79.0)	26.2 (79.2)	26.2 (79.2)	25.6 (78.1)	23.2 (73.8)	17.6 (63.7)	12.5 (54.5)	20.9 (69.6)
Record low °C (°F)	4.2 (39.6)	3.6 (38.5)	10.8 (51.4)	15.4 (59.7)	19.4 (66.9)	20.6 (69.1)	20.6 (69.1)	23.0 (73.4)	21.0 (69.8)	15.8 (60.4)	10.0 (50.0)	6.0 (42.8)	3.6 (38.5)
Average precipitation mm (inches)	12 (0.5)	23 (0.9)	37 (1.5)	68 (2.7)	175 (6.9)	283 (11.1)	370 (14.6)	257 (10.1)	266 (10.5)	145 (5.7)	24 (0.9)	7 (0.3)	1,667 (65.6)
Average precipitation days (≥ 1 mm)	2	2	3	5	11	17	21	21	16	9	2	1	110
Average relative humidity (%)	77	72	69	72	77	84	87	86	86	83	79	78	79
Mean monthly sunshine hours	188.9	203.9	221.9	217.7	206.5	141.5	127.0	133.8	145.2	188.4	201.2	183.2	2,159.2
Source 1: NOAA
Source 2: Bangladesh Meteorological Department (humidity 1981-2010)

== See also ==
- Upazilas of Bangladesh
- Districts of Bangladesh
- Divisions of Bangladesh
- Upazila
- Thana
