= Ishwaripur =

Village and historical site in Satkhira, Bangladesh

Coordinates: 22.3054°N 89.1061°E

Ishwaripur is a village in Shyamnagar Upazila, Satkhira District, Bangladesh. It has several historical sites, including the Jeshoreshwari Kali Temple, the triangular Chanda Bhairab Temple, the five-domed Tenga Mosque, and a Hammamkhana built in the late sixteenth century by Maharaja Pratapaditya.

== History ==
Once the capital of Raja Bikramaditya and Maharaja Pratapaditya was at Dhumghat. Later it was transferred to Ishwaripur. It was the capital city from 1590 to 1610. The first Catholic Church of Bengal was built in Ishwaripur in 1599. The Portuguese soldiers of Pratapaditya initiated the building process of the church. After the fall of Pratapaditya the area surrounding Iswaripur emerged as forest and people started going away from the area. The Mughal Foujders and the Jamiders also retreated from the area. Then there was no worship in the Jeshoreshwari Kali Temple. Eventually, the area was used by local robbers as a hiding place. The robbers worshiped the goddess Kali at that time. After some hundred years, somehow people from other villages came and worshiped the goddess. As the days past, there was a village situated surrounding the Temple. This village was known as Jessoreshwaripur, now known as Ishwaripur.
The village has a long heritage of social harmony. The Kali Temple, the catholic Church and the Tenga Mosque played an important role for the said harmonious relationship of the people of the village. In 1919, at the time of British rule, a post office (Ishwaripur Post Office) was placed in the village.

== Geography ==
Ishwaripur is located 64 kilometres (40 mi) south of Satkhira Sadar. It has an area of 1.5 square kilometres (0.58 sq mi) and is bounded by Kaliganj and Assasuni upazilas on the north, the Sundarbans on the south, Koyra and Assasuni upazilas on the east, West Bengal of India on the west. The village is situated on the bank of Ichamati River (now known as Kadamtali Canal).

== Demographics ==
According to the 2011 Bangladesh census, Ishwaripur had 781 households and a population of 3,323. The literacy rate (age 7 and over) was 49.2%, compared to the national average of 51.8%. The population is 94% Muslim and 6% Hindu.

== Education ==
There is one secondary school, Ishwaripur A Sobhan High School.

== Notable residents ==
- Maharaja Pratapaditya (1570-1620), son of Raja Bikramaditya (Sri Hari)
- Alhaj M. M. Hasim Ali (1910-1987), son of Alhaj M. M. Motiar Rahman
- M. M. Abdur Rashid (1943-2015), son of Alhaj M. M. Hasim Ali
- Jayanta Chattopadhyay (1946-) Reciter and Actor

== See also ==
- List of villages in Bangladesh
