= Sukumari Dutta =

Indian theater actress, manager and playwright

Sukumari Dutta or Golap Sundari was an Indian theater actress, manager and playwright. She was also known as a kirtan singer.

== Biography ==
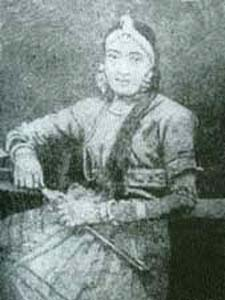
Sukumari Dutta in 1910

Dutta’s mother brought her to Calcutta in order to be trained as a vaishnav singer. She would later be described as remarkable singer and dancer. She became one of the first four women hired to be an actress by the Bengal Theater. This theater was noted for being the first public theater to employ actresses to act in female roles instead of male actors impersonating women. She later adopted the name Sukumari after she successfully played the heroine in Upendranath Das’s Sarat-Sarojini, which was performed at the Great National Theater on January 2, 1875. It was the name of her character in the play.

In a published biographical sketch, Dutta is said to have married Goshtobihari Dutta, a respectable and middle class husband from Bengal. This was an arranged marriage made under the Native Marriage Act III of 1872, which allowed mixed-caste and mixed-faith marriages in India. Goshtobihari also acted in Das’s Sarat-Sarojini. Dutta retired from acting after their marriage. During her time, actresses were ostracized because they were also considered prostitutes. Goshtobihari, however, deserted her, prompting Dutta to come back to theatrical performance. It is said that he followed Das in England after the latter fled India due to his anti-Raj sentiments. Dutta was left to raise their daughter.

== Career ==
Dutta’s career highlights included performances for the roles, Bimala in Durgeshnandini, Rani Oilobala in Purubikram, Birajmohini in Surendra-Binodini, Girijaya in Mrinalini, Malina in Asrumati, and Surjamukhi in Bishbriksha.

She was also identified as a kirtan singer. Kirtan is a form of singing where marginalized women sing religious songs. She also managed the all-women “Hindoo Female Theater”, which was active during the early 1880s. She also co-wrote the play, Apurba Sati Natak (The Unvanquished Chaste Maid), which was published in 1876 and performed at the Great National on August 23, 1876. This play, which is about the tragedy of a prostitute’s daughter, is said to be a mirror of the author’s life, particularly her marriage to someone who belong to a different social class.
