= N709 (Bangladesh) =

Highway in Bangladesh

N709
- Khulna City Bypass

Route information
- Part of AH41
- Maintained by RHD
- Length: 26.54 km (16.49 mi)

Major junctions
- Phultala end: Afil Gate
- N7 - Phultala; N760 - Zero Point, Khulna; N7 - Rupsha
- Rupsha end: Kudir Bottola

Location
- Country: Bangladesh

Highway system
- Roads in Bangladesh
← N708	→ N710

The N709 or Khulna City Bypass is a National Highway in Bangladesh. It connects Khulna with Mongla via Khan Jahan Ali Bridge.

== Junction and important places ==
- Afil Gate
- Chingrikhali Bazar
- Teligati
- Arongghata
- Mostafa More
- Bil Pabla
- Khulna Jail
- Zero Point
- Mohammad Nagar (Sanchibuniya)
- Khan Jahan Ali Bridge
- Jabusa
- Kudir Bottola
