= Daulatdia =

Village in Rajbari District, Bangladesh

Daulatdia দৌলতদিয়া
- Village
- Location in Bangladesh
- Coordinates: 23°46′08″N 89°47′09″E
- Country: Bangladesh
- District: Rajbari

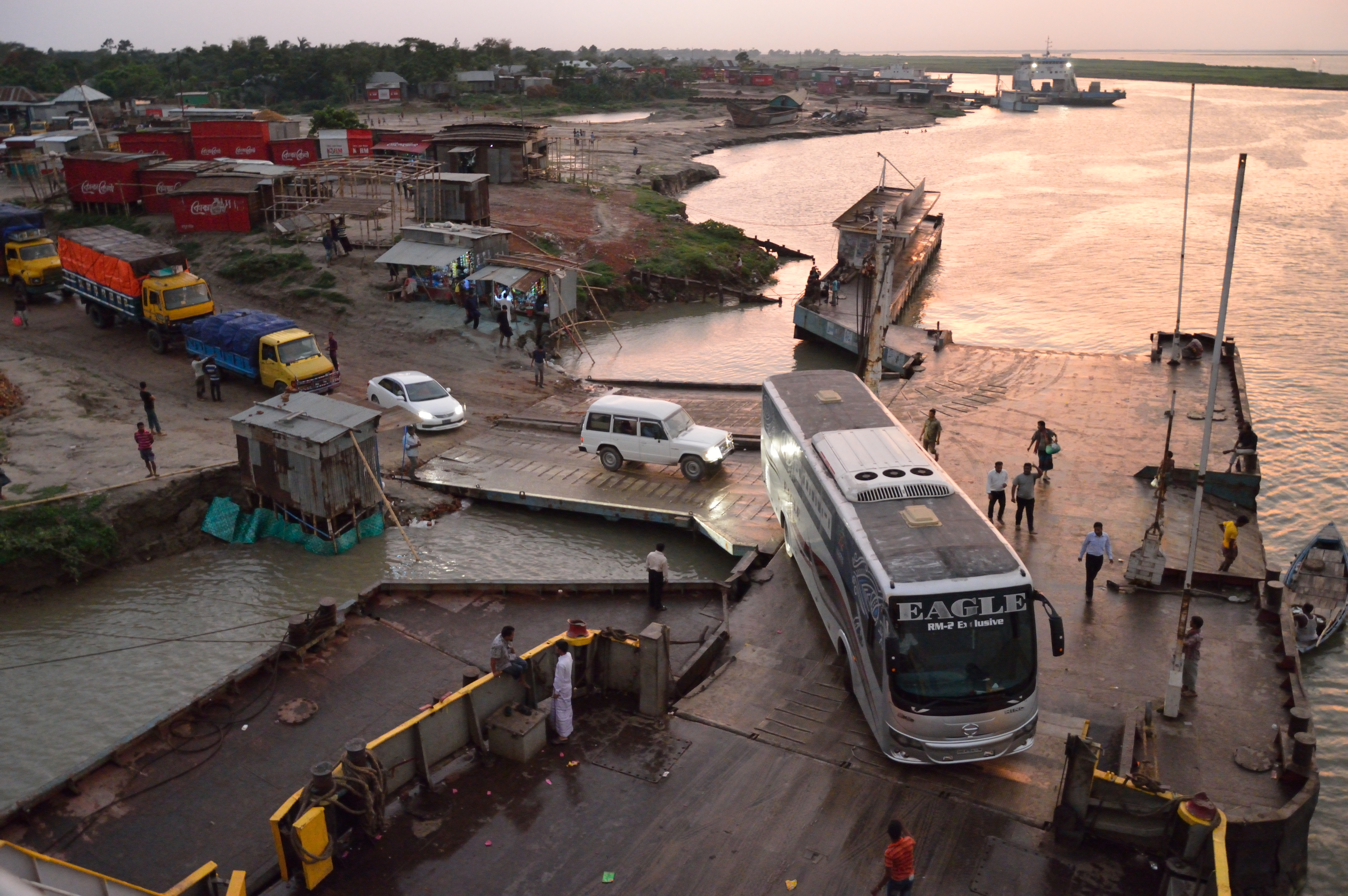
Jetty in Daulatdia

Daulatdia (Bengali: দৌলতদিয়া) is a village in Rajbari District, Bangladesh which is the largest brothel in Bangladesh, and has been called one of the largest brothels in the world. It is one of 20 officially sanctioned brothels in the country opening around 1988, although it was unofficially in existence for decades prior. Estimates of the number of sex workers in the village range from 1,300 to 2,000. Daulatdia services more than 3,000 men daily; these men can pay for sex, take drugs and gamble.

== Controversies ==
Though prostitution is only legal in Bangladesh for women aged 18 or older, the average age of newly arriving sex workers is 14, and some sex workers in Daulatdia are as young as 10. Many of them are sold into sex work for the equivalent of about $250 (in 2014), which they are then obligated to pay to pimps who are mostly older women, known as "madams". The sex workers are often tricked by their madams into taking drugs such as Ventolin or Oradexon, which are designed to fatten cattle.

== 2020 temporary closure ==
On March 20, 2020, it was ordered closed down in response to the COVID-19 pandemic in Bangladesh. On March 23, 2020, sex workers from Daulatdia appealed to the Bangladesh government for emergency funding. This ultimately led to the brothels being reopened soon after.

== See also ==
- Prostitution in Bangladesh
- Kandapara
