= N760 (Bangladesh) =

Road in Bangladesh

N760
- Khulna–Satkhira Highway; Khulna–Chuknagar–Satkhira Road; Khulna–Keshabpur Road

Route information
- Length: 60 km (37 mi)

Major junctions
- Khulna end: Power House Interchange
- N715 / N765 - Khulna Road Intersection; R755 - Chuknagar Intersection; N709 - Zero Point Intersection
- Satkhira end: Khulna Road Intersection

Location
- Country: Bangladesh

Highway system
- Roads in Bangladesh
← N716	→ N765

Khulna-Satkhira Highway or simply Khulna Road also known as Sher E Bangla Road in Khulna City portion is a national Highway connecting Khulna to Satkhira. The road was previously marked as R760, but it was upgraded into national highway.

== See also ==
- Satkhira–Bhomra port Road
