= N703 (Bangladesh) =

National highway in Bangladesh

N703
- Sher E Bangla Road; Jashore-Jhenaidah Road

Route information
- Part of AH1
- Length: 3 km (1.9 mi)

Major junctions
- From: N704 / N712 in Payra Square, Jhenaidah
- To: N712 in Hamdah Intersection

Location
- Country: Bangladesh

Highway system
- Roads in Bangladesh
← N702	→ N704

Sher E Bangla Road or simply Jashore - Jhenaidah Road is a national highway which connects Payra square, Jhenaidah to Hamdah intersection. The 3-kilometre (1.9 mi) highway was also previously known as the Jhenaidah–Jessore Highway. This highway plays an important role for regional and national connectivity in the western region.
