= Bhomra Land Port =

- Location in Bangladesh

Location
- Country: Bangladesh
- Location: Bhomra, Satkhira
- Coordinates: 22.6678539°N 88.9588706°E

Details
- Opened: 2013
- Type of harbour: dry port

Bhomra Land Port also known as Bhomra Port is one of the largest port in Bangladesh located in Bhomra Union of Satkhira Sadar Upazila. This port mainly used for the import and Export goods with India. In the Indian side of the port known as Gojardanga Port.

== History ==
The port was first opened as Boarder check point and Boarder Crossing point in 1988. Then only Passenger can cross through here. But in 2002 Both Bangladesh and Indian Government announced to open it as a full function port. And after 11 years of declaration it open as a port in 2013.
