= N704 (Bangladesh) =

Bangladeshi highway

N704
- Rajshahi–Khulna Highway; Rajshahi–Kushtia Highway; Pabna–Kushtia–Jhenaidah Highway
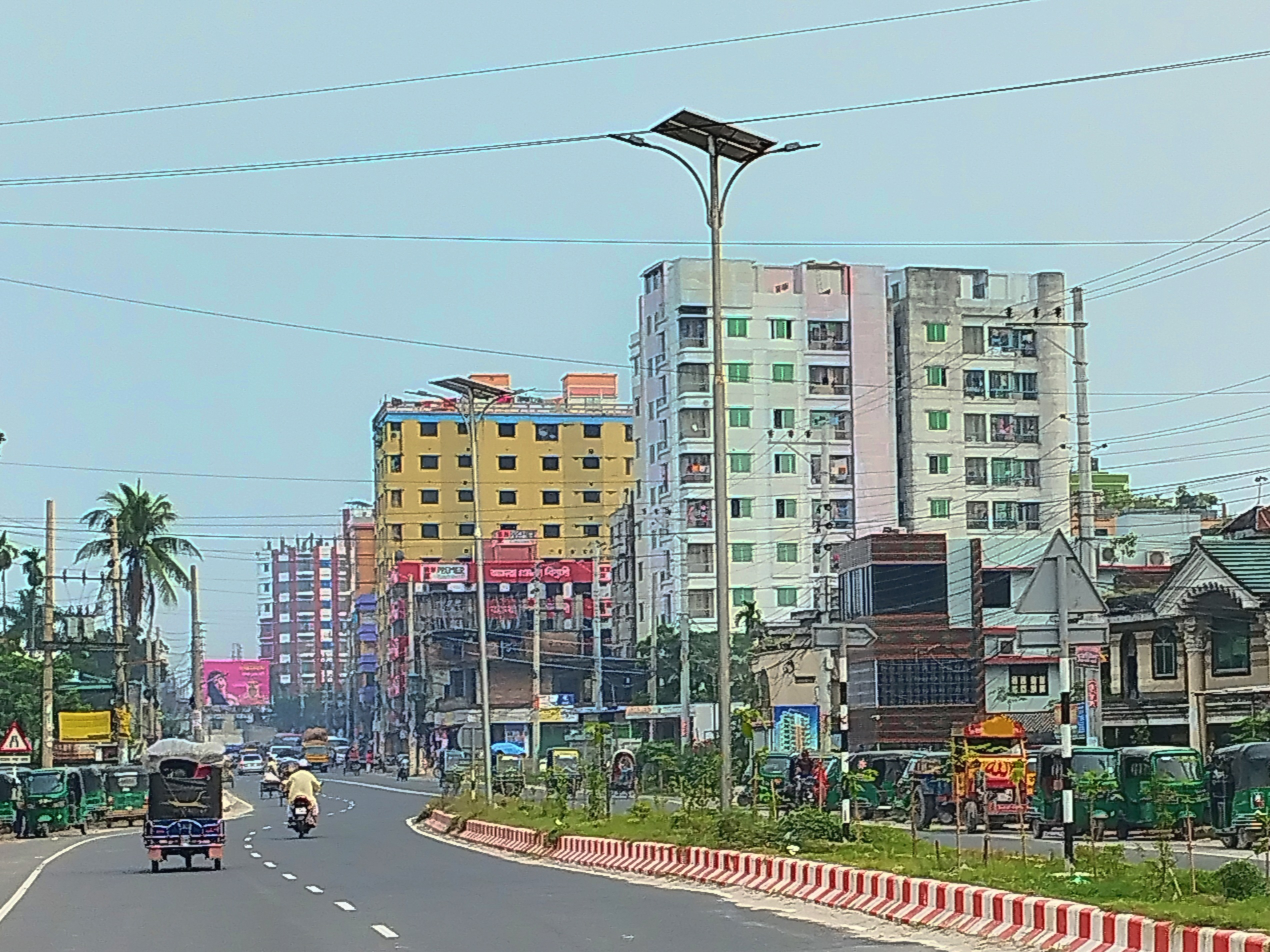
- N704 in Kushtia

Route information
- Part of AH41
- Length: 81.538 km (50.665 mi)

Major junctions
- Dashuria end: N6 / N705 - Dashuria Interchange
- Jhenaidah end: N7 / N703 / N712 - Arappur Interchange

Location
- Country: Bangladesh

Highway system
- Roads in Bangladesh
| ← N703 | → N705 |

N704 or Rajshahi-Khulna Highway is a Bangladeshi highway connecting Dasuria to Jhenaidah. It starts from the Arappur Interchange of the Jhenaidah Bypass and ends at the Dashuria Interchange in Ishwardi Upazila, Pabna where it meets with N6 and N705.

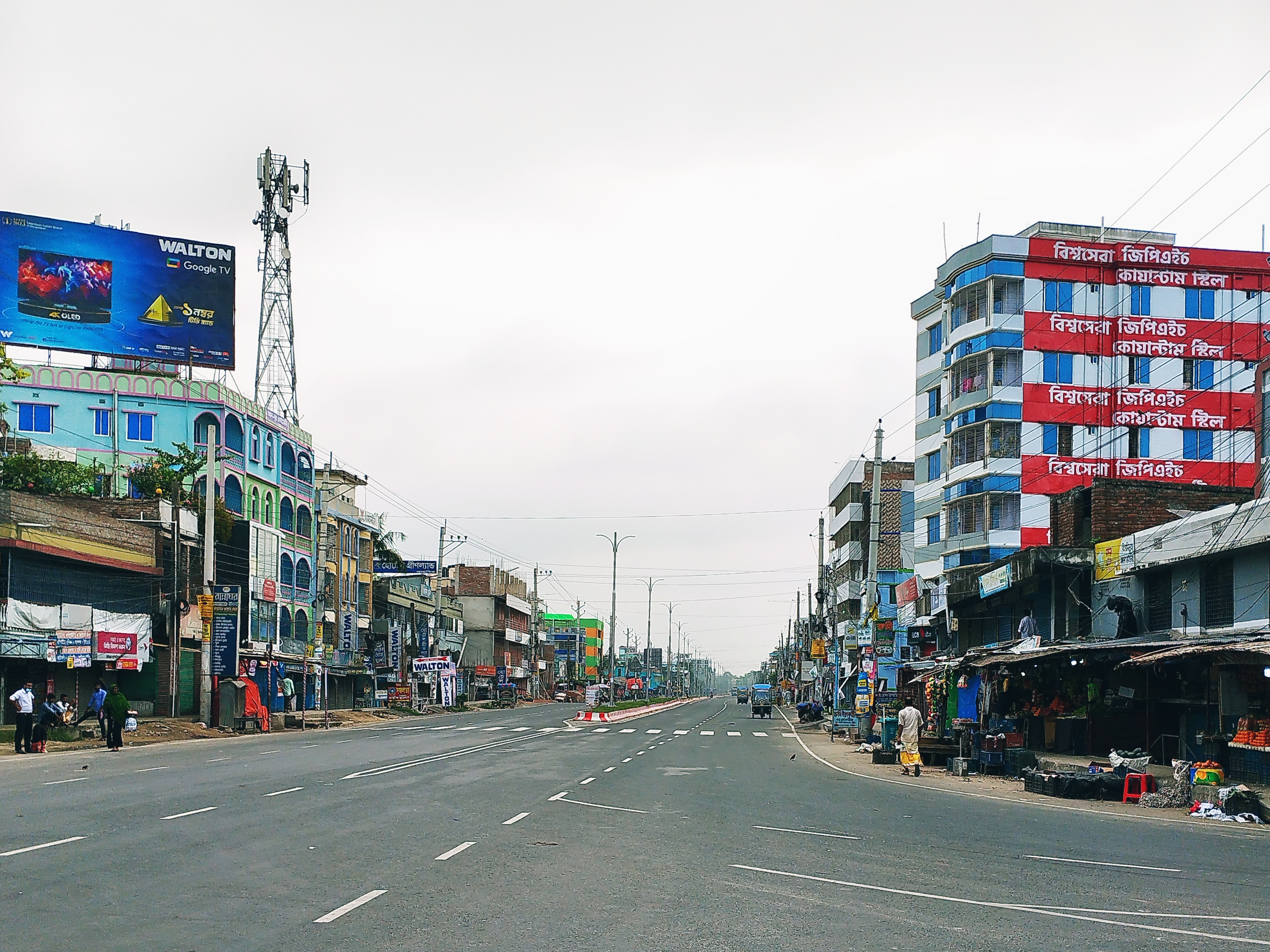
Chorhas Moree (Kushtia)

== See also ==
- List of roads in Bangladesh
