= Union councils of Kushtia District =

Union councils of Kushtia District (Bengali: কুষ্টিয়া জেলার ইউনিয়ন পরিষদসমূহ) are the smallest rural administrative and local government units in Kushtia District of Bangladesh. The district consists of 5 municipalities, 6 upazilas, 57 ward, 70 mahalla, 71 union parishods, mouza 710 and 978 villages.

== Bheramara Upazila ==
Bheramara Upazila is divided into Bheramara Municipality and six union parishads. The union parishads are subdivided into 43 mauzas and 78 villages. Bheramara Municipality is subdivided into 9 wards and 15 mahallas.

- Bahadurpur Union
- Bahir Char Union
- Chandgram Union
- Dharampur Union
- Juniadaha Union
- Mokarimpur Union

== Daulatpur Upazila ==
Daulatpur Upazila is divided into 14 union parishads. The union parishads are subdivided into 82 mauzas and 103 villages.

- Adabaria Union
- Aria Union
- Boalia Union
- Chilmari Union
- Daulatpur Union
- Hogolbaria Union
- Khalishakundi Union
- Moricha Union
- Mathurapur Union
- Piarpur Union
- Philipnagar Union
- Pragpur Union
- Ramkrishnapur Union
- Refaitpur Union

== Khoksa Upazila ==
Khoksa Upazila is divided into Khoksa Municipality and nine union parishads. The union parishads are subdivided into 82 mauzas and 103 villages.

- Ambaria Union
- Betbaria Union
- Gopgram Union
- Janipur Union
- Jayanti Hazra Union
- Khoksa Union
- Osmanpur Union
- Shomospur Union
- Shimulia Union

== Kumarkhali Upazila ==
Kumarkhali Upazila is divided into Kumarkhali Municipality and 11 union parishads. The union parishads are subdivided into 187 mauzas and 201 villages. Kumarkhali Municipality is subdivided into 9 wards and 17 mahallas.

- Bagulat Union
- Chandpur Union
- Chapra Union
- Joduboyra Union
- Jagannathpur Union
- Kaya Union
- Nandalalpur Union
- Panti Union
- Sodki Union
- Charsadipur Union
- Shelaidaha Union

== Kushtia Sadar Upazila ==
Kushtia Sadar Upazila is divided into Kushtia Municipality and 14 union parishads. The union parishads are subdivided into 122 mauzas and 176 villages. Kushtia Municipality is subdivided into 21 wards and 36 mahallas.

- Abdalpur Union
- Ailchara Union
- Alampur Union
- Barkhada Union
- Battail Union
- Goswami Durgapur Union
- Harinarayanpur Union
- Hatsh Haripur Union
- Jhaudia Union
- Mozompur Union
- Monohordia Union
- Patikabari Union
- Ujangram Union
- Ziarakhi Union

== Mirpur Upazila ==
Mirpur Upazila is divided into Mirpur Municipality and 13 union parishads. The union parishads are subdivided into 116 mauzas and 192 villages. Mirpur Municipality is subdivided into 9 wards and 9 mahallas.

- Ambaria Union
- Amla Union
- Bahalbaria Union
- Baruipara Union
- Chhatian Union
- Chithalia Union
- Dhubail Union
- Fulbaria Union
- Kursha Union
- Malihad Union
- Poradaha Union
- Sadarpur Union
- Talbaria Union
