= Gorai Railway Bridge =

Gorai Rail Bridge
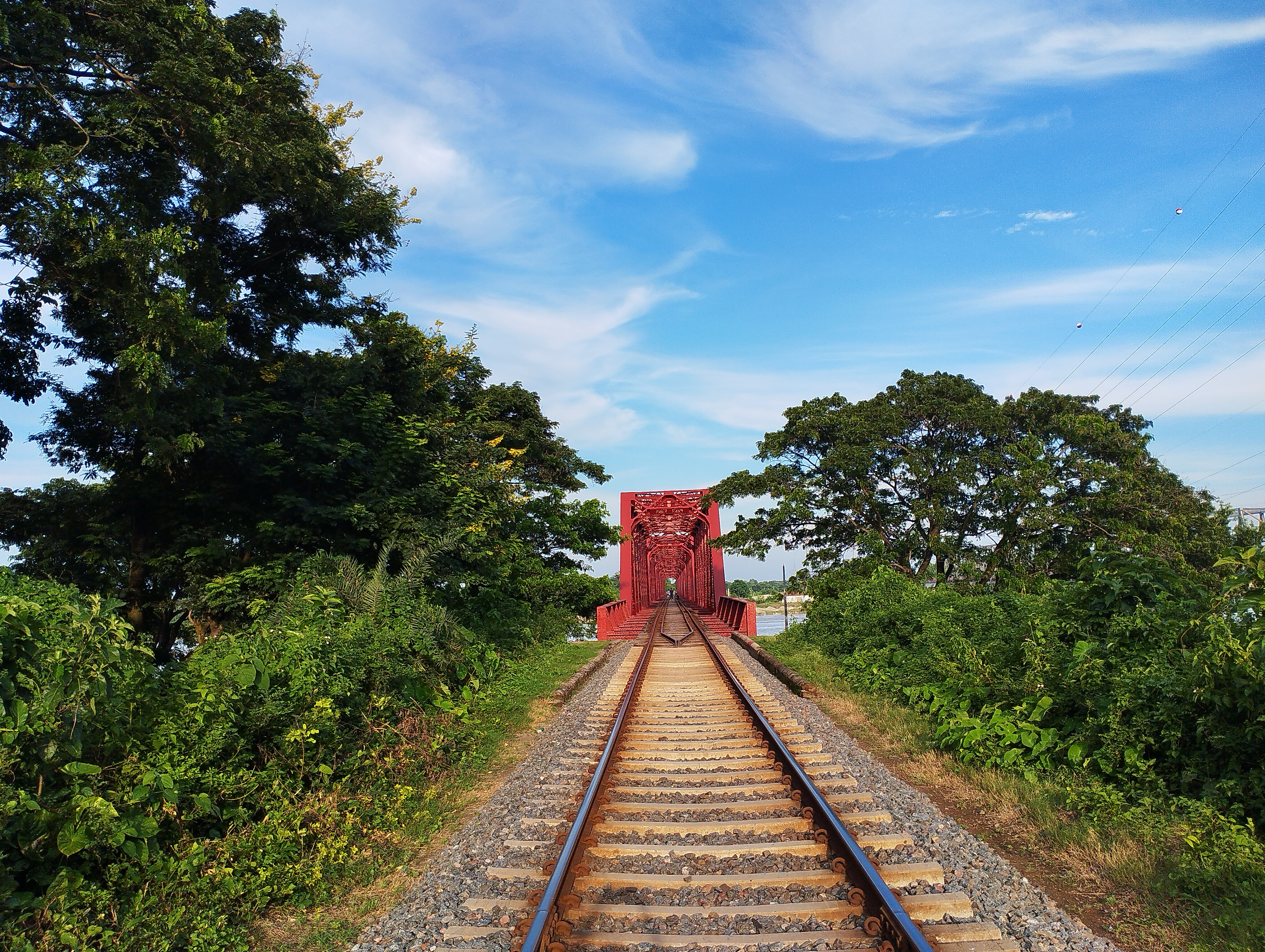
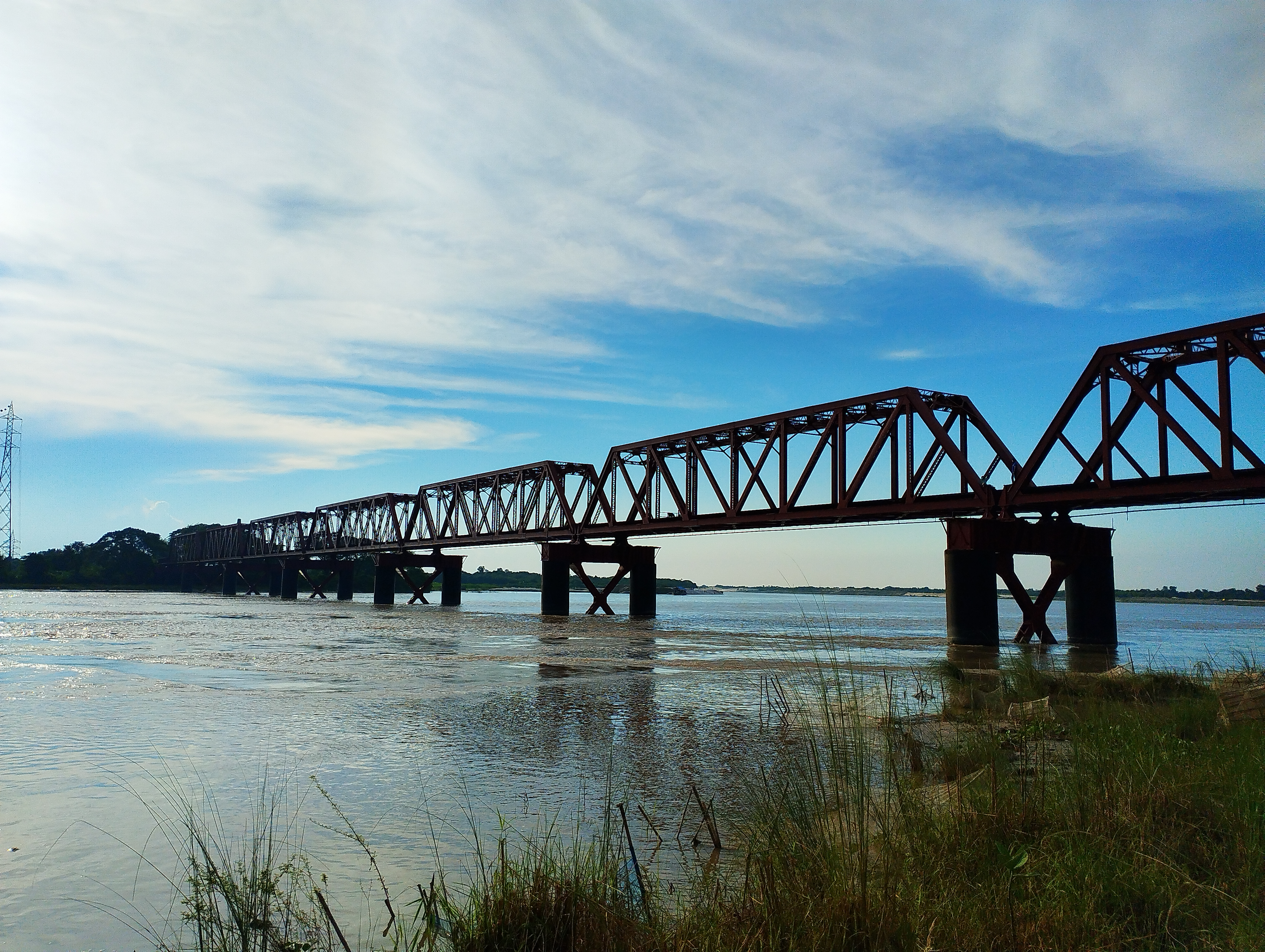
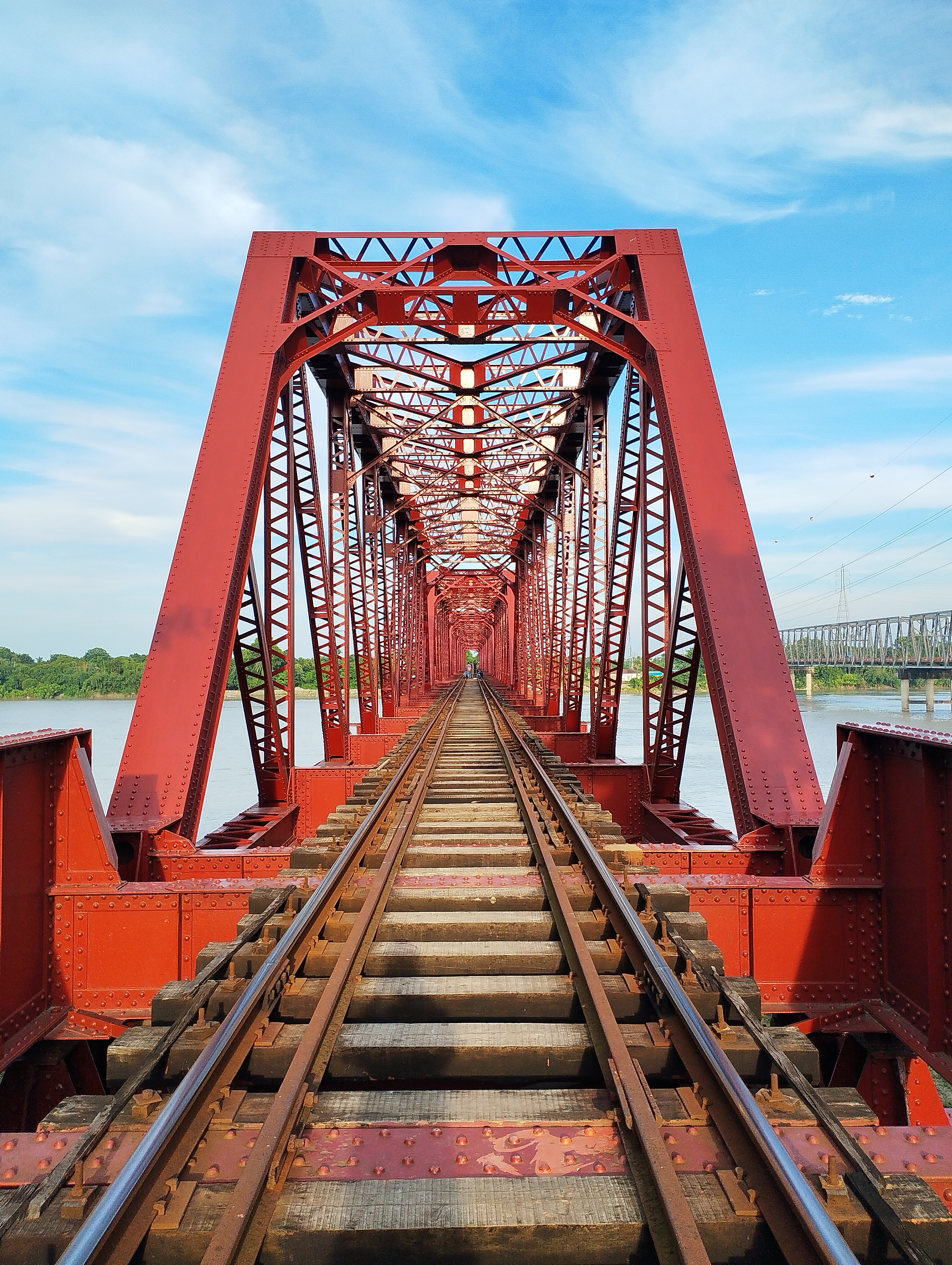
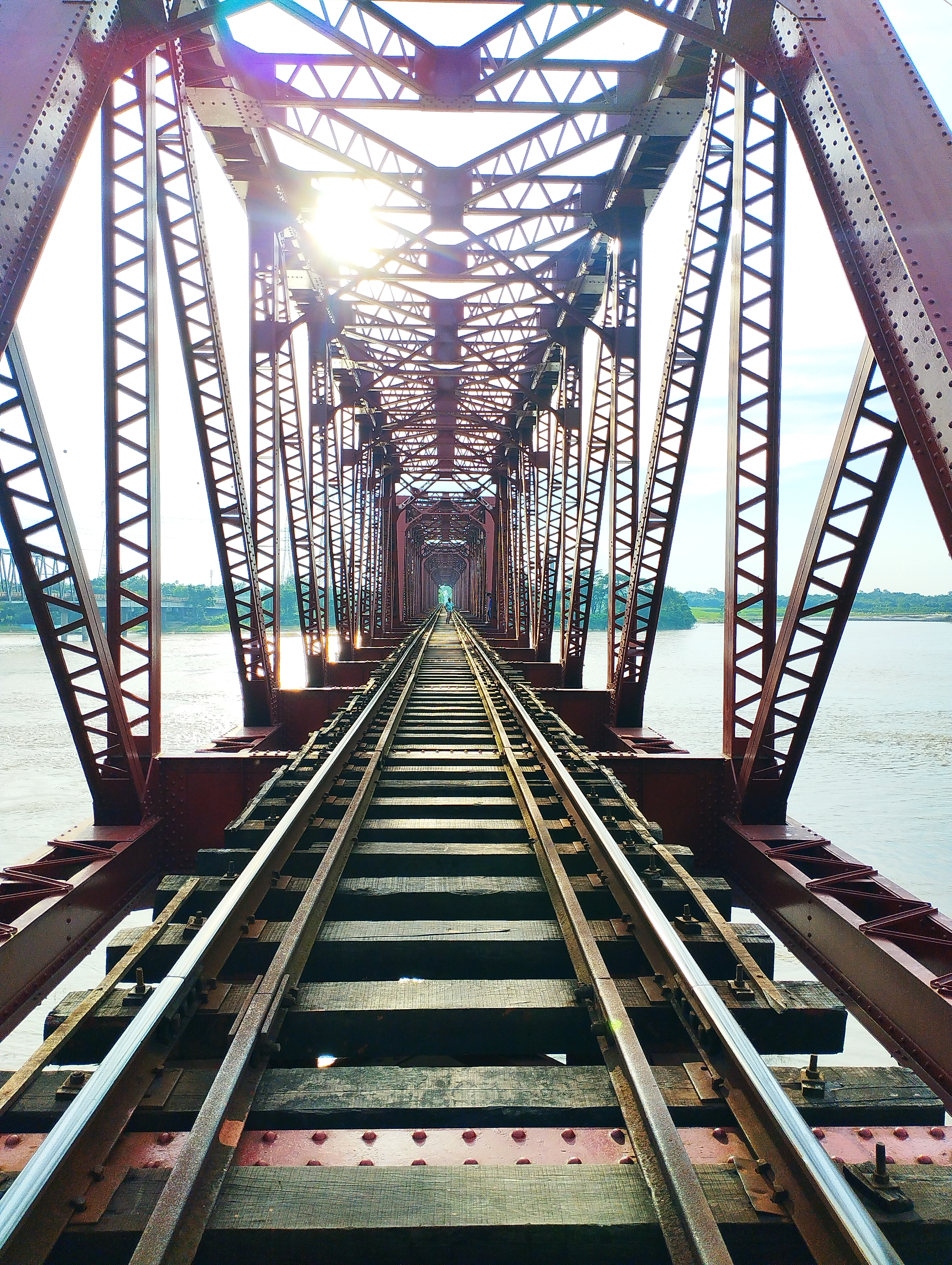
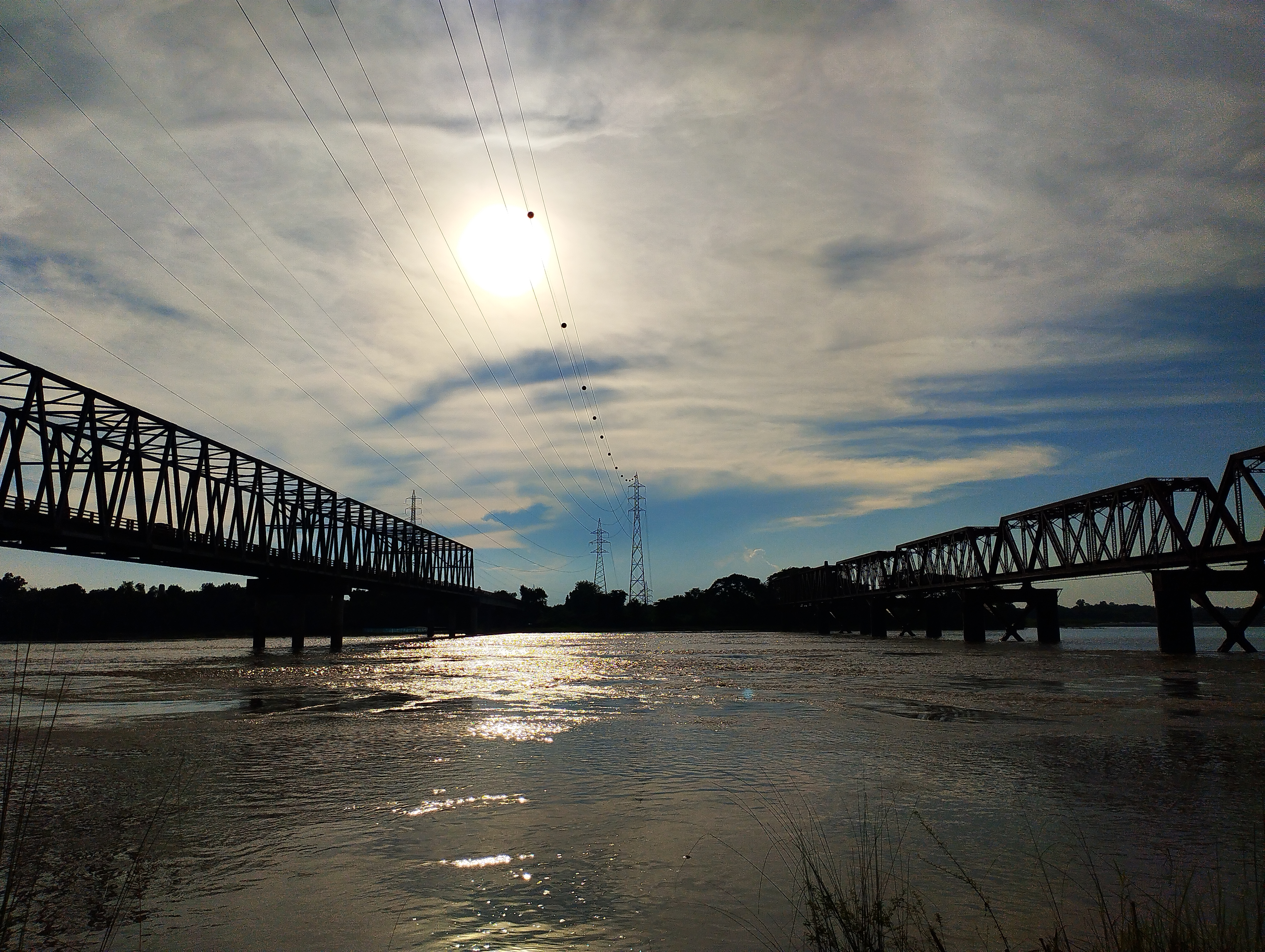
- On the left: Syed Mach-ud-Rumi Bridge, on the right: Gorai Railway Bridge
- Coordinates: 23°53′10″N 89°10′49″E
- Carries: Train
- Crosses: Gorai River
- Locale: Kaya, Kumarkhali Upazila, Kushtia District, Khulna Division, Bangladesh
- Other name(s): Kaya Railway Bridge
- Owner: Bangladesh Railway
- Maintained by: Railway Pakshi Division

Characteristics
- Material: Steel, Brick, Sand, Cement
- Total length: 515 meters

Rail characteristics
- No. of tracks: 1
- Track gauge: Broad gauge

History
- Constructed by: Eastern Bengal Railway
- Construction start: 1865
- Construction end: 1871; 154 years ago
- Rebuilt: 1936–1938

Gorai Railway Bridge is a railway bridge built over the Gorai River in the Kushtia District. Construction of the bridge began in 1865. It is the first major railway bridge in Bangladesh.

The Nakshikantha Commuter crossing the Gorai Rail Bridge

== History ==
The first railway in present-day Bangladesh was inaugurated on November 15, 1862. At that time the country’s first railway station Jagati railway station was established. In 1871, the railway line was extended from Jagati to Goalondo. One of the biggest challenges in constructing this railway was crossing the Gorai River in Kushtia. Work on building a bridge over the river began in 1865, and construction was completed in 1871. The bridge was designed by British engineer J.A. Temple.

In September 1936 a revised project was undertaken to replace the bridge’s girders and repair its piers. The Railway Board allocated a budget of 1.27 million rupees for this work. Aldwyn Smullar, an engineer from Eastern Bengal Railway was assigned to oversee the renovations. In 1936, three bridge spans were replaced, and the remaining four spans were replaced in 1937 and 1938.

== Bibliography ==
- Md. Rezaul Karim (2022). কুষ্টিয়ার প্রত্ননিদর্শন [Archaeological site of Kushtia] (in Bengali). Dhaka: Gatidhara. pp. 208, 209. ISBN 9789848950418.
