= Swastipur Shahi Mosque =

Mosque in Swastipur, Alampur, Kushtia Sadar, Kushtia, Bangladesh

Religion
- Affiliation: Islam

Location
- Location: Swastipur, Alampur Union, Kushtia Sadar Upazila, Kushtia District, Bangladesh
- Interactive map of Swastipur Shahi Mosque
- Coordinates: 23.8353°N 89.1009°E

Architecture
- Type: Mosque
- Style: Mughal architecture
- Completed: 1860s

Specifications
- Dome: 4 domes
- Minaret: 1
- Minaret height: 1 metre
- Materials: Brick, stone, sand

Swastipur Shahi Mosque is an ancient mosque and an archaeological monument of Bangladesh. The mosque is located in Kushtia Sadar Upazila of Kushtia District. According to researchers, the mosque was built around 1660 during the period of Shaista Khan. The mosque bears testimony to the early history of Islam in Kushtia District. At present, the khatib of the mosque is Mawlana Sirajul Islam Nizami.

== Location ==
This Shahi mosque is located in the village of Swastipur in Alampur Union of Kushtia Sadar Upazila in Kushtia District of Khulna Division. It can be reached by traveling about 11 kilometres from Kushtia town along the Kushtia–Jhenaidah Road.

== History ==
The mosque was built during the period of Nawab Shaista Khan (1660–1668). It still stands as a witness to history. According to local sources, the village was originally named Shaistapur after Nawab Shaista Khan. Over time, the name Shaistapur gradually changed to Swastipur. Accordingly, the mosque came to be known as Swastipur Shahi Mosque. Researchers believe that the mosque was constructed as a place for the imperial soldiers to rest and offer prayers during their journeys.

== Structure ==
The Swastipur Mosque has four small domes placed on four pillars at the corners, while the central dome is slightly larger than the others. The wall thickness of the mosque is about 0.91 metres and 1.01 metres including the pillars. It is a small mosque where only a single row of people could originally stand for prayer. Later, a large veranda was added along the eastern wall, increasing the size of the mosque. The mosque is three-domed, and researchers agree that it belongs to the Mughal period.

== Current condition ==
The mosque has been renovated several times over the years. Due to repeated renovations, many of its original archaeological features are gradually disappearing. Some sources suggest that the mosque was originally smaller and that the present structure was rebuilt after the original mosque was destroyed. The present structure indicates architectural characteristics of the Mughal period. The current khatib of the mosque is Mawlana Sirajul Islam Nizami. Many visitors come to see this historic mosque, and many people also offer vows and food offerings here.

== See also ==
- Shaista Khan Mosque
- Islamic University Central Mosque
