= Shalghar Madhua =

- Village
- Location within Khulna division Location within Bangladesh
- Coordinates: 23.816728°N 89.159380°E
- Country: Bangladesh
- Division: Khulna
- District: Kushtia
- Upazila: Kumarkhali
- Union: Bagulat

Population (2022)
  - Total: 3,299

Shalghar Madhua is a historic village located in Bagulat Union, Kumarkhali Upazila, Kushtia District, Bangladesh. The village once hosted the indigo plantation house (nilkuthi) of the oppressive planter Keni. A battle took place here between Keni's lathial force and that of Parisundari Devi. The village is divided by the Kalliganga River.

== History ==
At the end of the 18th century, indigo cultivation began in the Kushtia region. The rebellion of Shalghar Madhua alarmed the British government because revenue collection had ceased. A group of soldiers camped here to investigate the cause of the unrest. The indigo cultivators informed them that they were willing to pay the government's revenue but the government must take responsibility to protect the peasants from oppression and tyranny.

== Demographics ==
Shalghar Madhua has a total of 865 households with 3,299 inhabitants. Of the total population, 1,595 are male and 1,704 are female. The literacy rate is 64.89% (for individuals aged 7 years and above). The majority of the inhabitants are followers of Islam, while 155 people adhere to Hinduism.

== Bibliography ==
- History of Kushtia (2018).
- Mesbahul Haque (1987). Post-Plassey) Muslim Society and Indigo Rebellion in Bengal (PDF). Dhaka: Islamic Foundation.
