= Kushtia Model Thana =

Kushtia Model Thana কুষ্টিয়া মডেল থানা
- Thana of Bangladesh
- Interactive map of Kushtia Model Thana
- Coordinates: 23°56′N 89°07′E
- Country: Bangladesh
- Division: Khulna
- District: Kushtia
- Upazila: Kushtia Sadar
- Headquarters: Kushtia city

Government
  - Type: Thana administration
- Time zone: UTC+6 (BST)
- Website: Official website

Kushtia Model Thana is one of the thanas of Kushtia Sadar Upazila in Kushtia district in Khulna Division. However, this thana is also known as Kushtia Sadar Thana.

== History ==
Kushtia Model Thana was established in Kushtia district in 1823. Kushtia Thana is located in the heart of Kushtia city.

=== Kushtia police event controversy (2025) ===
On 31 May 2025, a police-organised event in Kushtia marking the reopening of the Kushtia Model Thana became the subject of controversy following protests by members of the Bangladesh Nationalist Party (BNP) and its youth wing, Jubo Dal. The Police Station was destroyed in the uprising against former Prime Minister Sheikh Hasina. The event was attended by law enforcement officials, political leaders, representatives from organisations such as the Students Against Discrimination, the Jatiya Nagorik Committee, and the Gono Odhikar Parishad.

Tensions arose when student leaders were given priority on stage while senior BNP and Jubo Dal figures were seated offstage. Several BNP members, including Al Amin Kanai and former district Jubo Dal general secretary Kamal Uddin, publicly criticised the arrangement, describing it as "disrespectful" and an "insult" to veteran politicians who had participated in recent protest movements. A brief scuffle occurred between BNP supporters and student attendees, though the situation was quickly brought under control by police and organizers.

== Location ==
Kushtia Model Thana is bordered on the north by Pabna Sadar and Ishwardi Upazila, on the south by Harinakundu Upazila and Shailkupa Upazila, on the east by Kumarkhali Upazila, and on the west by Mirpur Upazila (Kushtia) and Alamdanga Upazila. Kushtia Model Thana is located within Kushtia city itself.

== See also ==
- Islamic University, Bangladesh
- Kushtia Sadar Upazila
