= Ambaria Union =

Ambaria Union may refer to:

- Ambaria Union, Mirpur, a union in Mirpur Upazila
- Ambaria Union, Khoksa, a union in Khoksa Upazila
