= Daulatpur Union =

Durgapur Union may refer to:

- Daulatpur Union, Daulatpur, a union in Daulatpur Upazila
- Daulatpur Union, Harinakunda, a union in Harinakunda Upazila
- Daulatpur Union, Fatikchhari, former union in Fatikchhari Upazila
