= Pragpur Union =

Pragpur Union প্রাগপুর ইউনিয়ন
- Union
- Pragpur Union
- Location within Bangladesh
- Country: Bangladesh
- Division: Khulna
- District: Kushtia
- Upazila: Daulatpur

Area
  - Total: 28.00 km^{2} (10.81 sq mi)

Population (2011)
  - Total: 39,662
  - Density: 1,416/km^{2} (3,669/sq mi)
- Time zone: UTC+6 (BST)
- Website: pragpurup.kushtia.gov.bd

Pragpur Union (Bengali: প্রাগপুর ইউনিয়ন) is a union parishad situated at Daulatpur Upazila, in Kushtia District, Khulna Division of Bangladesh. The union has an area of 28.00 square kilometres (10.81 sq mi) and as of 2001 had a population of 39,662. There are 18 villages and 8 mouzas in the union.
