= Piarpur Union =

Piarpur Union পিয়ারপুর ইউনিয়ন
- Union
- Piarpur Union
- Country: Bangladesh
- Division: Khulna
- District: Kushtia
- Upazila: Daulatpur

Area
  - Total: 80.29 km^{2} (31.00 sq mi)

Population (2011)
  - Total: 45,000
  - Density: 560/km^{2} (1,500/sq mi)
- Time zone: UTC+6 (BST)
- Website: piarpurup.kushtia.gov.bd

Piarpur Union (Bengali: পিয়ারপুর ইউনিয়ন) is a union parishad situated at Daulatpur Upazila, in Kushtia District, Khulna Division of Bangladesh. The union has an area of 80.29 square kilometres (31.00 sq mi) and as of 2001 had a population of 45,000. There are 11 villages and 8 mouzas in the union.
