= Betbaria Union =

Betbaria Union বেতবাড়ীয়া ইউনিয়ন
- Union
- Betbaria Union
- Country: Bangladesh
- Division: Khulna
- District: Kushtia
- Upazila: Khoksa

Area
  - Total: 70.70 km^{2} (27.30 sq mi)

Population (2011)
  - Total: 30,823
  - Density: 436.0/km^{2} (1,129/sq mi)
- Time zone: UTC+6 (BST)
- Website: 3nobethbariaup.kushtia.gov.bd

Betbaria Union (Bengali: বেতবাড়ীয়া ইউনিয়ন) is a union parishad situated at Khoksa Upazila, in Kushtia District, Khulna Division of Bangladesh. The union has an area of 70.70 square kilometres (27.30 sq mi) and as of 2001 had a population of 30,477. There are 16 villages and 12 mouzas in the union.
