= Ailchara Union =

Ailchara Union আইলচারা ইউনিয়ন
- Union
- Location within Bangladesh
- Coordinates: 23.8585°N 89.0358°E
- Country: Bangladesh
- Division: Khulna
- District: Kushtia
- Upazila: Kushtia Sadar

Area
  - Total: 55.61 km^{2} (21.47 sq mi)

Population (2011)
  - Total: 27,737
  - Density: 498.8/km^{2} (1,292/sq mi)
- Time zone: UTC+6 (BST)
- Website: 7noailcharaup.kushtia.gov.bd

Ailchara Union (Bengali: আইলচারা ইউনিয়ন) is a union parishad situated at Kushtia Sadar Upazila, in Kushtia District, Khulna Division of Bangladesh. The union has an area of 55.61 square kilometres (21.47 sq mi) and as of 2001 had a population of 16,817. There are 10 villages and 2 mouzas in the union.
