= Mausoleum of Lalon Shah =

Mausoleum in Kushtia, Bangladesh

- লালন শাহের মাজার
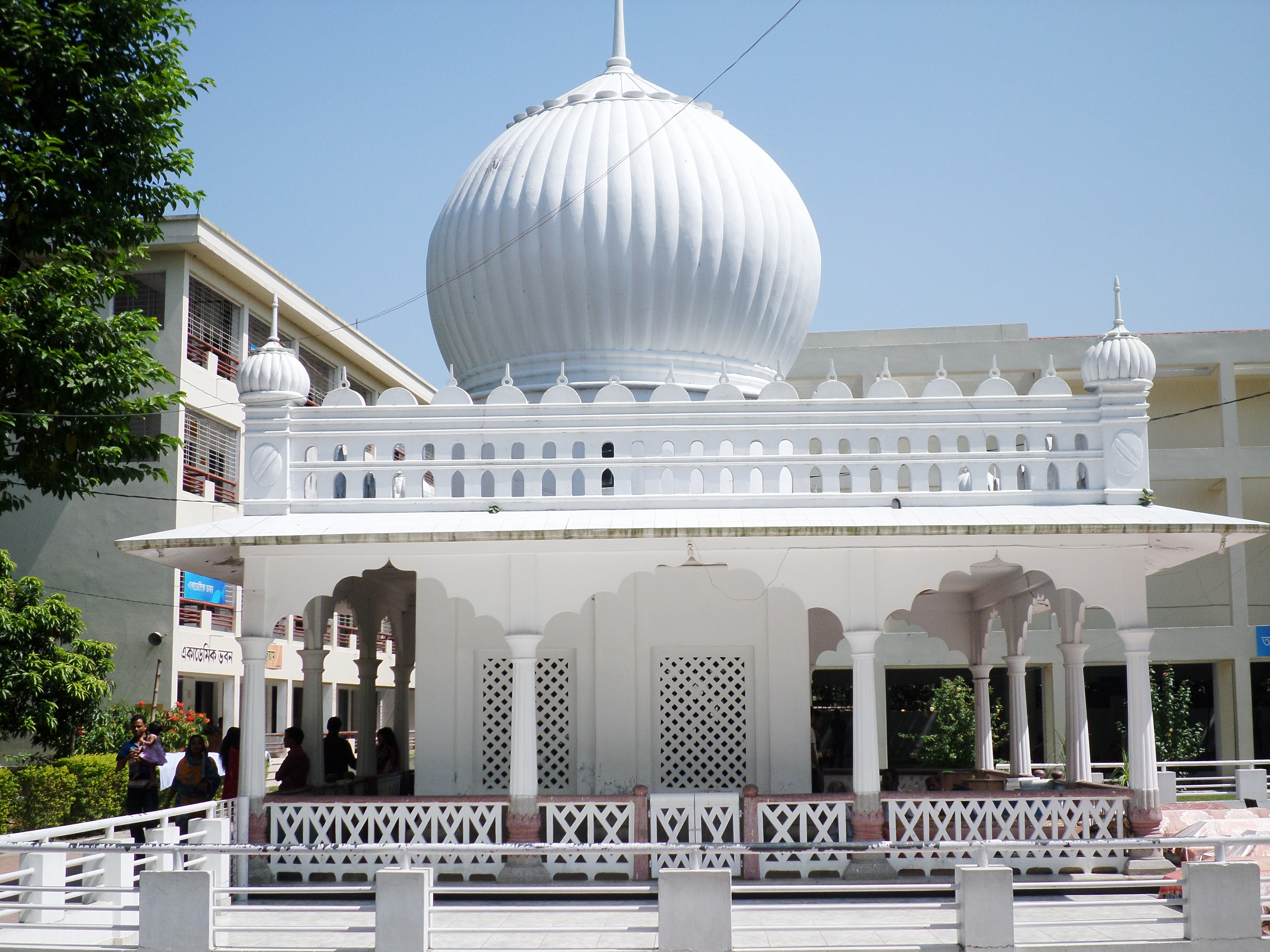
- Interactive map of Mausoleum of Lalon Shah
- Location: Cheuriya, Kumarkhali Upazila, Kushtia District, Bangladesh
- Coordinates: 23.8957877°N 89.1520984°E
- Type: Mausoleum
- Material: Concrete
- Opening date: 1963
- Dedicated to: Lalon Shah

Mausoleum of Lalon Shah or Lalon Akhara is the burial place of Baul Emperor Lalon, and a shrine built around this grave. The shrine is located in the village of Cheuriya in Kumarkhali Upazila of Kushtia District. Lalon Shah's shrine was not built in a day, after Lalon's death in 1890, his devotees started flocking here, the shrine originated from the large number of pilgrims. His present shrine was built there in 1963 and inaugurated by the then governor of East Pakistan, Abdul Monem Khan. Today, the shrine is visited by many visitors from different countries.

== Location ==
Lalon's shrine is located in Kumarkhali Upazila of Kushtia District, situated in Khulna Division of Bangladesh. The shrine is originally located in the Cheuriya village of the Upazila. This shrine is located near Kushtia city.

== History ==
The abode of the spiritual saint Lalon was in the village of Cheuriya. He died on Friday, October 17, 1890. He used to initiate locals and devotees in this Cheuriya. He used to organize festivals here every year during winter. Thousands of devotees flock to this festival, where they discuss Baul songs and physiology. Even after his death, devotees throng here every year for this talk. This is how an arena is created here. His beloved devotees are also buried here. This is how the popularity of this place has increased day by day. His present shrine was built there in 1963. In 2004, the academy building with a modern auditorium was constructed there. The mausoleum complex has a museum dedicated to Lalon.

== Observance ==
Lalon Fair is held in here twice every year. Once during Dol Purnima festival and again on 1st of Kartik (16th of October). This fair is organized at Lalon Akhara. Lalon Fair attracts his disciples from all over the country. Also many visitors from the country and abroad also arrive. Baul song festival is held here throughout the night. The shrine is decorated with colors on this occasion. However, there are criticisms that this fair has a ganja session, devotees come here and consume ganja.
