= Barkhada Union =

Barkhada Union বারখাদা ইউনিয়ন
- Union
- Barkhada Union
- Location within Bangladesh
- Coordinates: 23.9170°N 89.1076°E
- Country: Bangladesh
- Division: Khulna
- District: Kushtia
- Upazila: Kushtia Sadar

Area
  - Total: 59.57 km^{2} (23.00 sq mi)

Population (2011)
  - Total: 53,817
  - Density: 903.4/km^{2} (2,340/sq mi)
- Time zone: UTC+6 (BST)
- Website: 2nobarkhadaup.kushtia.gov.bd

Barkhada Union (Bengali: বারখাদা ইউনিয়ন) is a union parishad situated at Kushtia Sadar Upazila, in Kushtia District, Khulna Division of Bangladesh. The union has an area of 59.57 square kilometres (23.00 sq mi) and as of 2001 had a population of 53,817. There are 16 villages and 9 mouzas in the union.
