= Jayanti Hazra Union =

Jayanti Hazra Union জয়ন্তী হাজরা ইউনিয়ন
- Union
- Jayanti Hazra Union
- Country: Bangladesh
- Division: Khulna
- District: Kushtia
- Upazila: Khoksa

Area
  - Total: 36.88 km^{2} (14.24 sq mi)

Population (2011)
  - Total: 30,823
  - Density: 835.8/km^{2} (2,165/sq mi)
- Time zone: UTC+6 (BST)
- Website: 8nojoyntihazraup.kushtia.gov.bd

Jayanti Hazra Union (Bengali: জয়ন্তী হাজরা ইউনিয়ন) is a union parishad situated at Khoksa Upazila, in Kushtia District, Khulna Division of Bangladesh. The union has an area of 36.88 square kilometres (14.24 sq mi) and as of 2001 had a population of 13,272. There are 12 villages and 10 mouzas in the union.
