= Sodki Union =

Coordinates: 23.8500°N 89.2649°E

Sodki Union সদকী ইউনিয়ন
- Union
- Sodki Union
- Location within Bangladesh
- Country: Bangladesh
- Division: Khulna
- District: Kushtia
- Upazila: Kumarkhali

Area
  - Total: 59.96 km^{2} (23.15 sq mi)

Population (2011)
  - Total: 35,708
  - Density: 595.5/km^{2} (1,542/sq mi)
- Time zone: UTC+6 (BST)
- Website: 4nosadkiup.kushtia.gov.bd

Sodki Union (Bengali: সদকী ইউনিয়ন) is a union parishad of Kumarkhali Upazila, in Kushtia District, Khulna Division of Bangladesh. The union has an area of 59.96 square kilometres (23.15 sq mi) and as of 2001 had a population of 35,708. There are 34 villages and 25 mouzas in the union.
