= Akbar Hossain (novelist) =

- আকবর হোসেন
- Born: October 1, 1917; Kaya, Bengal Presidency, British India
- Died: June 2, 1981 (aged 63)
- Occupation: Novelist

Akbar Hossain (Bengali: আকবর হোসেন; 1 October 1917 – 2 June 1981) was a Bengali-language novelist of Bangladesh.

== Biography ==
Hossain was born in the village of Kaya (now in Kumarkhali Upazila under Kushtia District, Bangladesh). His father was Hazi Abdul Ali and his mother was Majeda begum. His wife was Hashna Banu.

He completed a Bachelor of Arts from Ripon College, Calcutta, in 1941. At that time he wrote in Sondhani, Shikkha, and daily newspapers The Azad and Nabajug.

He wrote his first novel, Abanchhito, in 1941. For years he tried unsuccessfully to get established writers, including Buddhadeva Bose, Kazi Abdul Wadud, S. Wajid Ali, Narayan Gangopadhyay and Jasimuddin to read his manuscript and provide feedback. Not until 1950 was he able to get it published. The novel was hugely successful, and in 1969 was adapted into a film by director Kamal Ahmed.

== Writings ==
=== Novels ===
- Abanchhito (1950)
- Ki Paini (1952)
- Mohamukti (1953)
- Dheu Jage (1961)
- Alochhaya (1964)
- Du diner Khelaghore (1965)
- Megh Bijli Badal (1968)
- Natun Prithibi (1974)
- Dushtokhato (1989)
- Ava O Tar Prothom Porush (1988)
