= Shomospur Union =

Shomospur Union শোমসপুর ইউনিয়ন
- Union
- Shomospur Union
- Location within Bangladesh
- Coordinates: 23.8335°N 89.2996°E
- Country: Bangladesh
- Division: Khulna
- District: Kushtia
- Upazila: Khoksa

Area
  - Total: 26.34 km^{2} (10.17 sq mi)

Population (2011)
  - Total: 13,095
  - Density: 497.2/km^{2} (1,288/sq mi)
- Time zone: UTC+6 (BST)
- Website: 2noosmanpurup.kushtia.gov.bd

Shomospur Union (Bengali: শোমসপুর ইউনিয়ন) is a union parishad of Khoksa Upazila, in Kushtia District, Khulna Division of Bangladesh. The union has an area of 26.34 square kilometres (10.17 sq mi) and as of 2001 had a population of 13,095. There are 10 villages and 10 mouzas in the union.
