= Boalia Union =

Boalia Union বোয়ালিয়া ইউনিয়ন
- Union
- Boalia Union
- Country: Bangladesh
- Division: Khulna
- District: Kushtia
- Upazila: Daulatpur

Area
  - Total: 27.25 km^{2} (10.52 sq mi)

Population (2011)
  - Total: 27,183
  - Density: 997.5/km^{2} (2,584/sq mi)
- Time zone: UTC+6 (BST)
- Website: boaliaup.kushtia.gov.bd

Boalia Union (Bengali: বোয়ালিয়া ইউনিয়ন) is a union parishad situated at Daulatpur Upazila, in Kushtia District, Khulna Division of Bangladesh. The union has an area of 70.58 square kilometres (27.25 sq mi) and as of 2001 had a population of 27,183. There are 9 villages and 6 mouzas in the union.
