= Refaitpur Union =

Refaitpur Union মথুরাপুর ইউনিয়ন
- Union
- Refaitpur Union
- Country: Bangladesh
- Division: Khulna
- District: Kushtia
- Upazila: Daulatpur

Area
  - Total: 89.41 km^{2} (34.52 sq mi)

Population (2011)
  - Total: 33,823
  - Density: 378.3/km^{2} (979.8/sq mi)
- Time zone: UTC+6 (BST)
- Website: 9norefaitpurup.kushtia.gov.bd

Refaitpur Union (Bengali: মথুরাপুর ইউনিয়ন) is a union parishad situated at Daulatpur Upazila, in Kushtia District, Khulna Division of Bangladesh. The union has an area of 89.41 square kilometres (34.52 sq mi) and as of 2001 had a population of 31,337. There are 22 villages and 16 mouzas in the union.
