= Mathurapur Union =

Mathurapur Union মথুরাপুর ইউনিয়ন
- Union
- Mathurapur Union
- Country: Bangladesh
- Division: Khulna
- District: Kushtia
- Upazila: Daulatpur

Area
  - Total: 69.93 km^{2} (27.00 sq mi)

Population (2011)
  - Total: 33,823
  - Density: 483.7/km^{2} (1,253/sq mi)
- Time zone: UTC+6 (BST)
- Website: mothurapurup.kushtia.gov.bd

Mathurapur Union (Bengali: মথুরাপুর ইউনিয়ন) is a union parishad situated at Daulatpur Upazila, in Kushtia District, Khulna Division of Bangladesh. The union has an area of 69.93 square kilometres (27.00 sq mi) and as of 2001 had a population of 33,823. There are 11 villages and 8 mouzas in the union.
