= Moricha Union =

Moricha Union মরিচা ইউনিয়ন
- Union
- Moricha Union
- Country: Bangladesh
- Division: Khulna
- District: Kushtia
- Upazila: Daulatpur

Area
  - Total: 119.71 km^{2} (46.22 sq mi)

Population (2011)
  - Total: 23,001
  - Density: 192.14/km^{2} (497.64/sq mi)
- Time zone: UTC+6 (BST)
- Website: morichaup.kushtia.gov.bd

Moricha Union (Bengali: মরিচা ইউনিয়ন) is a union parishad situated at Daulatpur Upazila, in Kushtia District, Khulna Division of Bangladesh. The union has an area of 119.71 square kilometres (46.22 sq mi) and as of 2001 had a population of 23,001. There are 16 villages and 17 mouzas in the union.
