= Charsadipur Union =

Charsadipur Union চরসাদীপুর ইউনিয়ন
- Union
- Charsadipur Union
- Location within Bangladesh
- Coordinates: 23.9596°N 89.2184°E
- Country: Bangladesh
- Division: Khulna
- District: Kushtia
- Upazila: Kumarkhali

Area
  - Total: 64.75 km^{2} (25.00 sq mi)

Population (2011)
  - Total: 18,732
  - Density: 289.3/km^{2} (749.3/sq mi)
- Time zone: UTC+6 (BST)
- Website: 11nocharsadipurup.kushtia.gov.bd

Charsadipur Union (Bengali: চরসাদীপুর ইউনিয়ন) is a union parishad of Kumarkhali Upazila, in Kushtia District, Khulna Division of Bangladesh. The union has an area of 64.75 square kilometres (25.00 sq mi) and as of 2001 had a population of 18,732. There are 9 villages and 10 mouzas in the union.
