= Chandpur Union, Kumarkhali =

Chandpur Union চাঁদপুর ইউনিয়ন
- Union
- Chandpur Union
- Location within Bangladesh
- Coordinates: 23.7654°N 89.1881°E
- Country: Bangladesh
- Division: Khulna
- District: Kushtia
- Upazila: Kumarkhali

Area
  - Total: 44.03 km^{2} (17.00 sq mi)

Population (2011)
  - Total: 28,311
  - Density: 643.0/km^{2} (1,665/sq mi)
- Time zone: UTC+6 (BST)
- Website: 9nochadpurup.kushtia.gov.bd

Chandpur Union (Bengali: চাঁদপুর ইউনিয়ন) is a union parishad situated at Kumarkhali Upazila, in Kushtia District, Khulna Division of Bangladesh. The union has an area of 44.03 square kilometres (17.00 sq mi) and as of 2001 had a population of 28,311. There are 13 villages and 14 mouzas in the union.
