= Osmanpur Union =

Osmanpur Union may refer to:

- Osmanpur Union, Khoksa, a union in Khoksa Upazila
- Osmanpur Union, Mirsarai, a union in Mirsarai Upazila
