= Hogolbaria Union =

Hogolbaria Union হোগলবাড়ীয়া ইউনিয়ন
- Union
- Hogolbaria Union
- Country: Bangladesh
- Division: Khulna
- District: Kushtia
- Upazila: Daulatpur

Area
  - Total: 49.21 km^{2} (19.00 sq mi)

Population (2011)
  - Total: 39,266
  - Density: 797.9/km^{2} (2,067/sq mi)
- Time zone: UTC+6 (BST)
- Website: hogolbariaup.kushtia.gov.bd

Hogolbaria Union (Bengali: হোগলবাড়ীয়া ইউনিয়ন) is a union parishad situated at Daulatpur Upazila, in Kushtia District, Khulna Division of Bangladesh. The union has an area of 49.21 square kilometres (19.00 sq mi) and as of 2001 had a population of 39,266. There are 20 villages and 13 mouzas in the union.
