= Philipnagar Union =

Philipnagar Union ফিলিপনগর ইউনিয়ন
- Union
- Philipnagar Union
- Country: Bangladesh
- Division: Khulna
- District: Kushtia
- Upazila: Daulatpur
- Founder: Shishir

Area
  - Total: 66.46 km^{2} (25.66 sq mi)

Population (2011)
  - Total: 30,920
  - Density: 465.2/km^{2} (1,205/sq mi)
- Time zone: UTC+6 (BST)
- Website: philipnagorup.kushtia.gov.bd

Philipnagar Union (Bengali: ফিলিপনগর ইউনিয়ন) is a union parishad situated at Daulatpur Upazila, in Kushtia District, Khulna Division of Bangladesh. THE POST CODE IS 7051. The union has an area of 66.46 square kilometres (25.66 sq mi) and as of 2001 had a population of 30,920. There are 13 villages and 8 mouzas in the union.
