= Abdalpur Union =

Abdalpur Union আব্দালপুর ইউনিয়ন
- Union
- Location within Bangladesh
- Coordinates: 23.7688°N 89.1032°E
- Country: Bangladesh
- Division: Khulna
- District: Kushtia
- Upazila: Kushtia Sadar

Area
  - Total: 65.00 km^{2} (25.10 sq mi)

Population (2011)
  - Total: 27,737
  - Density: 426.7/km^{2} (1,105/sq mi)
- Time zone: UTC+6 (BST)
- Website: 11noabdulpurup.kushtia.gov.bd

Abdalpur Union (Bengali: আব্দালপুর ইউনিয়ন) is a union parishad situated at Kushtia Sadar Upazila, in Kushtia District, Khulna Division of Bangladesh. The union has an area of 65.00 square kilometres (25.10 sq mi) and as of 2001 had a population of 27,737. There are 12 villages and 9 mouzas in the union.
