= Panti Union =

Panti Union পান্টি ইউনিয়ন
- Union
- Panti Union
- Location within Bangladesh
- Coordinates: 23.7714°N 89.2100°E
- Country: Bangladesh
- Division: Khulna
- District: Kushtia
- Upazila: Kumarkhali

Area
  - Total: 25.90 km^{2} (10.00 sq mi)

Population (2011)
  - Total: 25,238
  - Density: 974.4/km^{2} (2,524/sq mi)
- Time zone: UTC+6 (BST)
- Website: 10nopantiup.kushtia.gov.bd

Panti Union (Bengali: পান্টি ইউনিয়ন) is a union parishad of Kumarkhali Upazila, in Kushtia District, Khulna Division of Bangladesh. The union has an area of 25.90 square kilometres (10.00 sq mi) and as of 2001 had a population of 15,449. There are 21 villages and 19 mouzas in the union.
