= Janipur Union =

Janipur Union জানিপুর ইউনিয়ন
- Union
- Janipur Union
- Country: Bangladesh
- Division: Khulna
- District: Kushtia
- Upazila: Khoksa

Area
  - Total: 38.48 km^{2} (14.86 sq mi)

Population (2011)
  - Total: 14,385
  - Density: 373.8/km^{2} (968.2/sq mi)
- Time zone: UTC+6 (BST)
- Website: 4nojanipurup.kushtia.gov.bd

Janipur Union (Bengali: জানিপুর ইউনিয়ন) is a union parishad situated at Khoksa Upazila, in Kushtia District, Khulna Division of Bangladesh. The union has an area of 38.48 square kilometres (14.86 sq mi) and as of 2001 had a population of 14,385. There are 16 villages and 10 mouzas in the union.
