= Nandalalpur Union =

Coordinates: 23.8724°N 89.2151°E

Nandalalpur Union নন্দলালপুর ইউনিয়ন
- Union
- Nandalalpur Union
- Location within Bangladesh
- Country: Bangladesh
- Division: Khulna
- District: Kushtia
- Upazila: Kumarkhali

Area
  - Total: 69.93 km^{2} (27.00 sq mi)

Population (2011)
  - Total: 25,238
  - Density: 360.9/km^{2} (934.7/sq mi)
- Time zone: UTC+6 (BST)
- Website: 5nonandolalpurup.kushtia.gov.bd

Nandalalpur Union (Bengali: নন্দলালপুর ইউনিয়ন) is a union parishad situated at Kumarkhali Upazila, in Kushtia District, Khulna Division of Bangladesh. The union has an area of 69.93 square kilometres (27.00 sq mi) and as of 2001 had a population of 40,138. There are 20 villages and 19 mouzas in the union.
