= Shimulia Union, Khoksa =

Shimulia Union শিমুলিয়া ইউনিয়ন
- Union
- Shimulia Union
- Location within Bangladesh
- Coordinates: 23.8022°N 89.3163°E
- Country: Bangladesh
- Division: Khulna
- District: Kushtia
- Upazila: Khoksa

Area
  - Total: 39.55 km^{2} (15.27 sq mi)

Population (2011)
  - Total: 16,385
  - Density: 414.3/km^{2} (1,073/sq mi)
- Time zone: UTC+6 (BST)
- Website: 6noshomospurup.kushtia.gov.bd

Shimulia Union (Bengali: শিমুলিয়া ইউনিয়ন) is a union parishad of Khoksa Upazila, in Kushtia District, Khulna Division of Bangladesh. The union has an area of 39.55 square kilometres (15.27 sq mi) and as of 2001 had a population of 16,385. There are 9 villages and 8 mouzas in the union.
