= Ziarakhi Union =

Ziarakhi Union জিয়ারখি ইউনিয়ন
- Union
- Ziarakhi Union
- Location within Bangladesh
- Coordinates: 23.8480°N 89.1508°E
- Country: Bangladesh
- Division: Khulna
- District: Kushtia
- Upazila: Kushtia Sadar

Area
  - Total: 55.61 km^{2} (21.47 sq mi)

Population (2011)
  - Total: 27,737
  - Density: 498.8/km^{2} (1,292/sq mi)
- Time zone: UTC+6 (BST)
- Website: 6noziaraakhiup.kushtia.gov.bd

Ziarakhi Union (Bengali: জিয়ারখি ইউনিয়ন) is a union parishad of Kushtia Sadar Upazila, in Kushtia District, Khulna Division of Bangladesh. The union has an area of 55.61 square kilometres (21.47 sq mi) and as of 2001 had a population of 16,817. There are 14 villages and 5 mouzas in the union.
