= Shelaidaha Union =

Shelaidaha Union শিলাইদহ ইউনিয়ন
- Union
- Shelaidaha Union
- Location within Bangladesh
- Coordinates: 23.9149°N 89.2298°E
- Country: Bangladesh
- Division: Khulna
- District: Kushtia
- Upazila: Kumarkhali

Area
  - Total: 64.41 km^{2} (24.87 sq mi)

Population (2011)
  - Total: 24,238
  - Density: 376.3/km^{2} (974.6/sq mi)
- Time zone: UTC+6 (BST)
- Website: 2noshelaidahup.kushtia.gov.bd

Shelaidaha Union (Bengali: শিলাইদহ ইউনিয়ন) is a union parishad of Kumarkhali Upazila, in Kushtia District, Khulna Division of Bangladesh. The union has an area of 64.41 square kilometres (24.87 sq mi) and as of 2001 had a population of 24,238. There are 17 villages and 17 mouzas in the union.
