= Ujangram Union =

Ujangram Union উজানগ্রাম ইউনিয়ন
- Union
- Ujangram Union
- Location within Bangladesh
- Coordinates: 23.7926°N 89.1106°E
- Country: Bangladesh
- Division: Khulna
- District: Kushtia
- Upazila: Kushtia Sadar

Area
  - Total: 44.26 km^{2} (17.09 sq mi)

Population (2011)
  - Total: 27,737
  - Density: 626.7/km^{2} (1,623/sq mi)
- Time zone: UTC+6 (BST)
- Website: 10noujangramup.kushtia.gov.bd

Ujangram Union (Bengali: উজানগ্রাম ইউনিয়ন) is a union parishad of Kushtia Sadar Upazila, in Kushtia District, Khulna Division of Bangladesh under the region of the Islamic University. The union has an area of 44.26 square kilometres (17.09 sq mi) and as of 2001 had a population of 21,720. There are 15 villages and 11 mouzas in the union.
