= Mozompur Union =

Mozompur Union মজমপুর ইউনিয়ন
- Union
- Mozompur Union
- Country: Bangladesh
- Division: Khulna
- District: Kushtia
- Upazila: Kushtia Sadar

Area
  - Total: 36.80 km^{2} (14.21 sq mi)

Population (2011)
  - Total: 28,749
  - Density: 781.2/km^{2} (2,023/sq mi)
- Time zone: UTC+6 (BST)
- Website: 3nomazampurup.kushtia.gov.bd

Mozompur Union (Bengali: মজমপুর ইউনিয়ন) is a union parishad situated at Kushtia Sadar Upazila, in Kushtia District, Khulna Division of Bangladesh. The union has an area of 38.80 square kilometres (14.98 sq mi) and as of 2001 had a population of 28,749. There are 14 villages and 9 mouzas in the union.
