= Chapra Union =

Chapra Union চাপড়া ইউনিয়ন
- Union
- Chapra Union
- Location within Bangladesh
- Coordinates: 23.8587°N 89.1742°E
- Country: Bangladesh
- Division: Khulna
- District: Kushtia
- Upazila: Kumarkhali

Area
  - Total: 60.86 km^{2} (23.50 sq mi)

Population (2011)
  - Total: 34,820
  - Density: 572.1/km^{2} (1,482/sq mi)
- Time zone: UTC+6 (BST)
- Website: 6nochapraup.kushtia.gov.bd

Chapra Union (Bengali: চাপড়া ইউনিয়ন) is a union parishad situated at Kumarkhali Upazila, in Kushtia District, Khulna Division of Bangladesh. The union has an area of 60.86 square kilometres (23.50 sq mi) and as of 2001 had a population of 34,820. There are 22 villages and 19 mouzas in the union.
