= Aria Union =

Aria Union আড়িয়া ইউনিয়ন
- Union
- Aria Union
- Country: Bangladesh
- Division: Khulna
- District: Kushtia
- Upazila: Daulatpur

Area
  - Total: 33.67 km^{2} (13.00 sq mi)

Population (2011)
  - Total: 26,564
  - Density: 789.0/km^{2} (2,043/sq mi)
- Time zone: UTC+6 (BST)
- Website: ariaup.kushtia.gov.bd

Aria Union (Bengali: আড়িয়া ইউনিয়ন) is a union parishad situated at Daulatpur Upazila, in Kushtia District, Khulna Division of Bangladesh. The union has an area of 33.67 square kilometres (13.00 sq mi) and as of 2001 had a population of 26,564. There are 13 villages and 6 mouzas in the union.
