= Gopgram Union =

Gopgram Union গোপগ্রাম ইউনিয়ন
- Union
- Gopgram Union
- Country: Bangladesh
- Division: Khulna
- District: Kushtia
- Upazila: Khoksa

Area
  - Total: 16.73 km^{2} (6.46 sq mi)

Population (2011)
  - Total: 30,823
  - Density: 1,842/km^{2} (4,772/sq mi)
- Time zone: UTC+6 (BST)
- Website: gopgram7up.kushtia.gov.bd

Gopgram Union (Bengali: গোপগ্রাম ইউনিয়ন) is a union parishad situated at Khoksa Upazila, in Kushtia District, Khulna Division of Bangladesh. The union has an area of 16.73 square kilometres (6.46 sq mi) and as of 2001 had a population of 12,471. There are 12 villages and 7 mouzas in the union.
