= Jagannathpur Union, Kumarkhali =

Jagannathpur Union জগন্নাথপুর ইউনিয়ন
- Union
- Jagannathpur Union
- Country: Bangladesh
- Division: Khulna
- District: Kushtia
- Upazila: Kumarkhali

Area
  - Total: 38.12 km^{2} (14.72 sq mi)

Population (2011)
  - Total: 25,238
  - Density: 662.1/km^{2} (1,715/sq mi)
- Time zone: UTC+6 (BST)
- Website: 3nojagonnathpurup.kushtia.gov.bd

Jagannathpur Union (Bengali: জগন্নাথপুর ইউনিয়ন) is a union parishad situated at Kumarkhali Upazila, in Kushtia District, Khulna Division of Bangladesh. The union has an area of 38.12 square kilometres (14.72 sq mi) and as of 2001 had a population of 22,582. There are 14 villages and 14 mouzas in the union.
