= Ramkrishnapur Union =

Ramkrishnapur Union রামকৃষ্ণপুর ইউনিয়ন
- Union
- Ramkrishnapur Union
- Country: Bangladesh
- Division: Khulna
- District: Kushtia
- Upazila: Daulatpur

Area
  - Total: 129.68 km^{2} (50.07 sq mi)

Population (2011)
  - Total: 26,168
  - Density: 201.79/km^{2} (522.63/sq mi)
- Time zone: UTC+6 (BST)
- Website: 5noramkrishnopurup.kushtia.gov.bd

Ramkrishnapur Union (Bengali: রামকৃষ্ণপুর ইউনিয়ন) is a union parishad situated at Daulatpur Upazila, in Kushtia District, Khulna Division of Bangladesh. The union has an area of 129.55 square kilometres (50.02 sq mi) and as of 2001 had a population of 26,168. There are 21 villages and 8 mouzas in the union.
