= Adabaria Union =

Adabaria Union আদাবাড়িয়া ইউনিয়ন
- Union
- Location within Bangladesh
- Coordinates: 23.9915°N 88.7800°E
- Country: Bangladesh
- Division: Khulna
- District: Kushtia
- Upazila: Daulatpur

Area
  - Total: 30.43 km^{2} (11.75 sq mi)

Population (2011)
  - Total: 39,266
  - Density: 1,290/km^{2} (3,342/sq mi)
- Time zone: UTC+6 (BST)
- Postal code: 7052
- Website: adabariaup.kushtia.gov.bd

Adabaria Union (Bengali: আদাবাড়িয়া ইউনিয়ন) is a union parishad situated at Daulatpur Upazila, in Kushtia District, Khulna Division of Bangladesh. The union has an area of 30.43 square kilometres (11.75 sq mi) and as of 2001 had a population of 39,266. There are 6 villages and 6 mouzas in the union.
