= Monohordia Union =

Monohordia Union মনোহরদিয়া ইউনিয়ন
- Union
- Monohordia Union
- Location within Bangladesh
- Coordinates: 23.7286°N 89.0475°E
- Country: Bangladesh
- Division: Khulna
- District: Kushtia
- Upazila: Kushtia Sadar

Area
  - Total: 21.19 km^{2} (8.18 sq mi)

Population (2011)
  - Total: 23,499
  - Density: 1,109/km^{2} (2,872/sq mi)
- Time zone: UTC+6 (BST)
- Website: 13nomonohardiaup.kushtia.gov.bd

Monohordia Union (Bengali: মনোহরদিয়া ইউনিয়ন) is a union parishad of Kushtia Sadar Upazila, in Kushtia District, Khulna Division of Bangladesh. The union has an area of 21.19 square kilometres (8.18 sq mi) and as of 2001 had a population of 23,499. There are 11 villages and 2 mouzas in the union.
