= Patikabari Union =

Patikabari Union পাটিকাবাড়ী ইউনিয়ন
- Union
- Patikabari Union
- Location within Bangladesh
- Coordinates: 23.7899°N 89.0023°E
- Country: Bangladesh
- Division: Khulna
- District: Kushtia
- Upazila: Kushtia Sadar

Area
  - Total: 44.26 km^{2} (17.09 sq mi)

Population (2011)
  - Total: 21,720
  - Density: 490.7/km^{2} (1,271/sq mi)
- Time zone: UTC+6 (BST)
- Website: 8nopatikabariup.kushtia.gov.bd

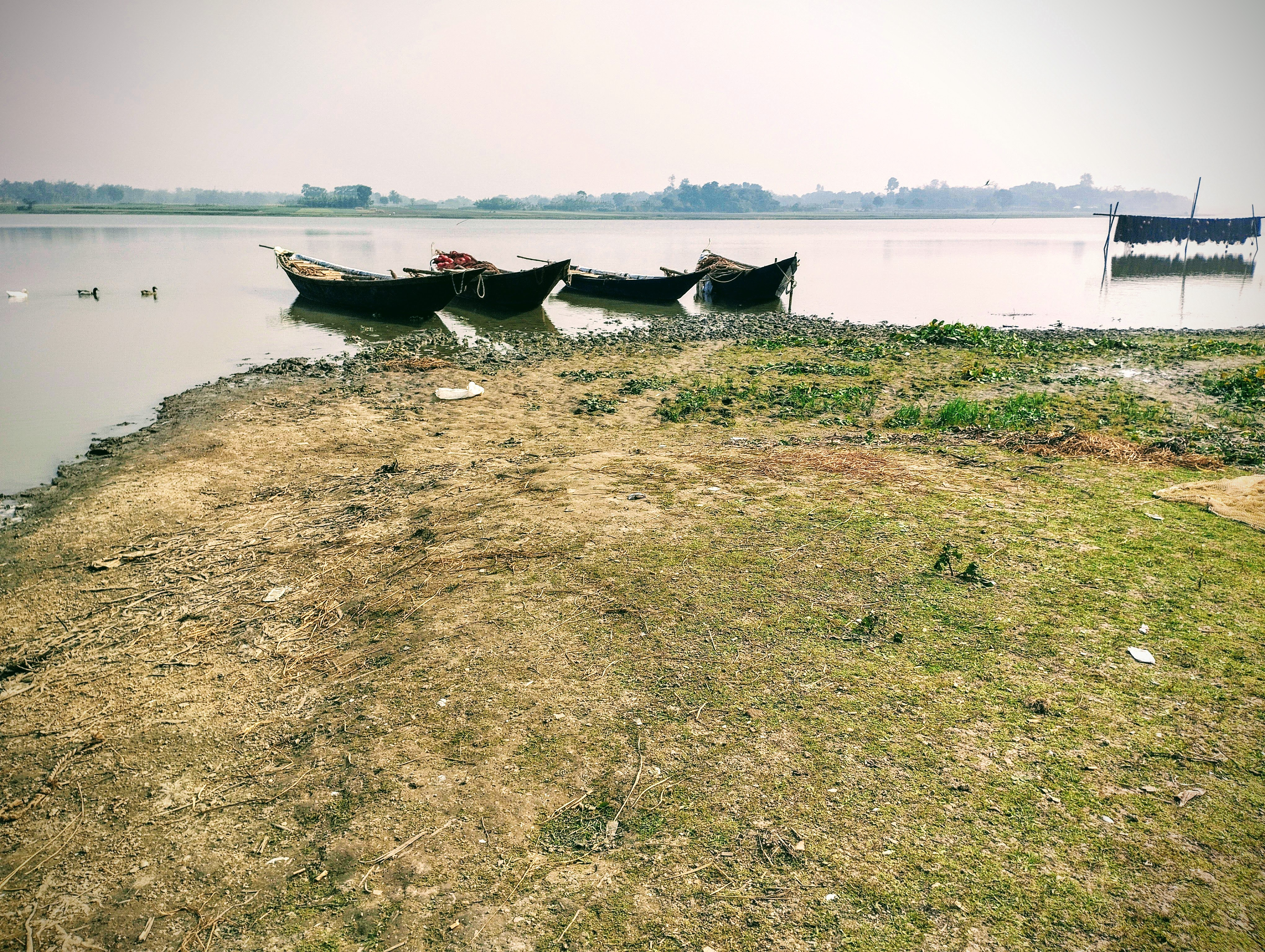

Patikabari Union (Bengali: পাটিকাবাড়ী ইউনিয়ন) is a union parishad of Kushtia Sadar Upazila, in Kushtia District, Khulna Division of Bangladesh. The union has an area of 44.26 square kilometres (17.09 sq mi) and as of 2001 had a population of 21,720. There are 15 villages and 11 mouzas in the union.
