= Chilmari Union =

Chilmary Union চিলমারী ইউনিয়ন
- Union
- Chilmary Union
- Location within Bangladesh
- Coordinates: 24.0803°N 88.7352°E
- Country: Bangladesh
- Division: Khulna
- District: Kushtia
- Upazila: Daulatpur

Area
  - Total: 121.34 km^{2} (46.85 sq mi)

Population (2001)
  - Total: 21,094
  - Density: 173.84/km^{2} (450.25/sq mi)
- Time zone: UTC+6 (BST)
- Website: chilmaryup.kushtia.gov.bd

Chilmary Union (Bengali: চিলমারী ইউনিয়ন) is a union parishad situated at Daulatpur Upazila, in Kushtia District, Khulna Division of Bangladesh. The union has an area of 121.34 square kilometres (46.85 sq mi) and as of 2001 had a population of 21,094. There are 18 villages and 08 mouzas in the union.
