= Khoksa Union =

Khoksa Union খোকসা ইউনিয়ন
- Union
- Khoksa Union
- Country: Bangladesh
- Division: Khulna
- District: Kushtia
- Upazila: Khoksa

Area
  - Total: 22.45 km^{2} (8.67 sq mi)

Population (2011)
  - Total: 8,385
  - Density: 373.5/km^{2} (967.4/sq mi)
- Time zone: UTC+6 (BST)
- Website: 1nokhoksaup.kushtia.gov.bd

Khoksa Union (Bengali: খোকসা ইউনিয়ন) is a union parishad situated at Khoksa Upazila, in Kushtia District, Khulna Division of Bangladesh. The union has an area of 22.45 square kilometres (8.67 sq mi) and as of 2001 had a population of 8,385. There are 5 villages and 4 mouzas in the union.
