= Joduboyra Union =

Joduboyra Union যদুবয়রা ইউনিয়ন
- Union
- Joduboyra Union
- Location within Bangladesh
- Coordinates: 23.8347°N 89.2266°E
- Country: Bangladesh
- Division: Khulna
- District: Kushtia
- Upazila: Kumarkhali

Area
  - Total: 69.93 km^{2} (27.00 sq mi)

Population (2011)
  - Total: 40,108
  - Density: 573.5/km^{2} (1,485/sq mi)
- Time zone: UTC+6 (BST)
- Website: 8nojaduboyraup.kushtia.gov.bd

Joduboyra Union (Bengali: যদুবয়রা ইউনিয়ন) is a union parishad of Kumarkhali Upazila, in Kushtia District, Khulna Division of Bangladesh. The union has an area of 69.93 square kilometres (27.00 sq mi) and as of 2001 had a population of 40,108. There are 20 villages and 19 mouzas in the union.
