= Aminul Haque Badsha =

Aminul Haque Badsha (full name: Khandaker Aminul Haque Badsha; 24 October 1944 – 10 February 2015) was a Bangladeshi journalist, writer, and organizer of the Bangladesh Liberation War. He was the Deputy Press Secretary of Sheikh Mujibur Rahman, the founding president of Bangladesh, and one of the founding members of the Swadhin Bangla Betar Kendra.

== Early life ==
Badsha was born on 24 October 1944 in Courtpara, Kushtia. His father, Khandaker Lutful Haque, was a registered classical musician and dramatist at Rajshahi Betar (Radio Rajshahi). He studied at Kushtia Government College, where he served as the General Secretary of the student body in 1962. He later obtained a master's degree in sociology from the University of Dhaka. During the rule of Ayub Khan, he was actively involved in student politics and was associated with the Bangladesh Chhatra League, serving as its Organizational Secretary and was imprisoned multiple times.

== Career ==
After Sheikh Mujibur Rahman was released following the withdrawal of the Agartala Conspiracy Case in 1969, Aminul Haque Badsha was appointed as his Press Secretary. He was present on the stage alongside other student leaders during Mujib's historic speech on 7 March 1971. He was stuck from 25 March to 27 March at the Hotel Intercontinental Dhaka after he went there to brief the press and Pakistan Army launched Operation Searchlight. He was accompanied by Barrister Moudud Ahmed, and journalist Simon Dring. He then went into hiding.

Badsha was one of the founders and key organizers of Swadhin Bangla Betar Kendra, the clandestine radio station that played a significant role in the Bangladesh Liberation War of 1971. He also served as the Secretary of the External Publicity Division of the Mujibnagar Government. He was summoned by a Pakistan Military Court on 6 August 1971.

Following the assassination of Sheikh Mujibur Rahman in 1975, Badsha was forced into exile. He lived in India and later in the United Kingdom, where he worked as a journalist for various international media outlets as freelance journalist. He also served as a correspondent for ATN Bangla's U.S. branch for an extended period.

Badsha attended an adda at the Jatiya Press Club in March 2007. He attended a discussion on Bangladesh Rifles mutiny in March 2009.

== Personal life ==
Badsha's brother Raju Ahmed, an actor shot dead on 11 December 1972 after which he took the body to Bangabandhu Bhaban to Sheikh Mujibur Rahman and sought justice for the killing.

== Death ==
Aminul Haque Badsha died on 10 February 2015 in London at the age of 69. A funeral prayer and a public mourning ceremony were held at Brick Lane Jame Masjid in London. His body was later repatriated to Bangladesh on a Biman Bangladesh Airlines flight.

Prominent expatriate journalist Abdul Gaffar Choudhury remarked about his passing:

“At the very least, I wanted Badsha to be buried in Bangladesh with state honors. He deserved it. But no efforts could convince the authorities to do so.”

— Abdul Gaffar Choudhury
