= Bagulat Union =

Bagulat Union বাগুলাট ইউনিয়ন
- Union
- Bagulat Union
- Location within Bangladesh
- Coordinates: 23.8196°N 89.1641°E
- Country: Bangladesh
- Division: Khulna
- District: Kushtia
- Upazila: Kumarkhali

Area
  - Total: 60.42 km^{2} (23.33 sq mi)

Population (2011)
  - Total: 25,238
  - Density: 417.7/km^{2} (1,082/sq mi)
- Time zone: UTC+6 (BST)
- Website: 7nobagulatup.kushtia.gov.bd

Bagulat Union (Bengali: বাগুলাট ইউনিয়ন) is a union parishad of Kumarkhali Upazila, in Kushtia District, Khulna Division of Bangladesh. The union has an area of 60.42 square kilometres (23.33 sq mi) and as of 2001 had a population of 13,095. There are 16 villages and 16 mouzas in the union.
