= Alampur Union =

Alampur Union আলামপুর ইউনিয়ন
- Union
- Alampur Union
- Location within Bangladesh
- Coordinates: 23.8438°N 89.0983°E
- Country: Bangladesh
- Division: Khulna
- District: Kushtia
- Upazila: Kushtia Sadar

Area
  - Total: 69.72 km^{2} (26.92 sq mi)

Population (2011)
  - Total: 38,326
  - Density: 549.7/km^{2} (1,424/sq mi)
- Time zone: UTC+6 (BST)
- Website: 5noalampurup.kushtia.gov.bd

Alampur Union (Bengali: আলামপুর ইউনিয়ন) is a union parishad situated at Kushtia Sadar Upazila, in Kushtia District, Khulna Division of Bangladesh. The union has an area of 69.72 square kilometres (26.92 sq mi) and as of 2001 had a population of 38,326.

== Settlements ==
There are 11 villages and 6 mouzas in the union. Villages:

- Swastipur
- Kathulia
- Shimulia
- Darbeshpur
- Swargpur
- Nawapara
- Dahkula
- Alampur
- Rajapur
- Khairpur
- Chapaigachi
