= Daulatpur Union, Daulatpur =

Daulatpur Union দৌলতপুর ইউনিয়ন
- Union
- Daulatpur Union
- Location within Bangladesh
- Coordinates: 24.0128°N 88.8458°E
- Country: Bangladesh
- Division: Khulna
- District: Kushtia
- Upazila: Daulatpur

Area
  - Total: 84.56 km^{2} (32.65 sq mi)

Population (2011)
  - Total: 31,720
  - Density: 375.1/km^{2} (971.6/sq mi)
- Time zone: UTC+6 (BST)
- Website: daulatpurup.kushtia.gov.bd

Daulatpur Union (Bengali: দৌলতপুর ইউনিয়ন) is a union parishad of Daulatpur Upazila, in Kushtia District, Khulna Division of Bangladesh. The union has an area of 84.56 square kilometres (32.65 sq mi) and as of 2001 had a population of 31,720. There are 23 villages and 19 mouzas in the union.
