= Ambaria Union, Khoksa =

Ambaria Union আমবাড়িয়া ইউনিয়ন
- Union
- Ambaria Union
- Country: Bangladesh
- Division: Khulna
- District: Kushtia
- Upazila: Khoksa

Area
  - Total: 49.93 km^{2} (19.28 sq mi)

Population (2011)
  - Total: 30,823
  - Density: 617.3/km^{2} (1,599/sq mi)
- Time zone: UTC+6 (BST)
- Website: 9noambariaup.kushtia.gov.bd

Ambaria Union (Bengali: আমবাড়িয়া ইউনিয়ন) is a union parishad situated at Khoksa Upazila, in Kushtia District, Khulna Division of Bangladesh. The union has an area of 49.93 square kilometres (19.28 sq mi) and as of 2001 had a population of 30,823. There are 12 villages and 7 mouzas in the union.
