= Kaya Union =

Kaya Union কয়া ইউনিয়ন
- Union
- Kaya Union
- Location within Bangladesh
- Country: Bangladesh
- Division: Khulna
- District: Kushtia
- Upazila: Kumarkhali

Area
  - Total: 18.64 km^{2} (7.20 sq mi)

Population (2011)
  - Total: 30,988
  - Density: 1,662/km^{2} (4,306/sq mi)
- Time zone: UTC+6 (BST)
- Website: 1nokayaup.kushtia.gov.bd

Kaya Union (Bengali: কয়া ইউনিয়ন) is a union parishad situated at Kumarkhali Upazila, in Kushtia District, Khulna Division of Bangladesh. The union has an area of 18.64 square kilometres (7.20 sq mi) and as of 2001 had a population of 30,988. There are 14 villages and 12 mouzas in the union.
