= Osmanpur Union, Khoksa =

Osmanpur Union ওসমানপুর ইউনিয়ন
- Union
- Osmanpur Union
- Location within Bangladesh
- Coordinates: 23.7814°N 89.2621°E
- Country: Bangladesh
- Division: Khulna
- District: Kushtia
- Upazila: Khoksa

Area
  - Total: 48.87 km^{2} (18.87 sq mi)

Population (2011)
  - Total: 13,726
  - Density: 280.9/km^{2} (727.4/sq mi)
- Time zone: UTC+6 (BST)
- Website: 2noosmanpurup.kushtia.gov.bd

Osmanpur Union (Bengali: ওসমানপুর ইউনিয়ন) is a union parishad of Khoksa Upazila, in Kushtia District, Khulna Division of Bangladesh. The union has an area of 48.87 square kilometres (18.87 sq mi) and as of 2001 had a population of 13,726. There are 11 villages and 11 mouzas in the union.
