= Sultana Firdousi =

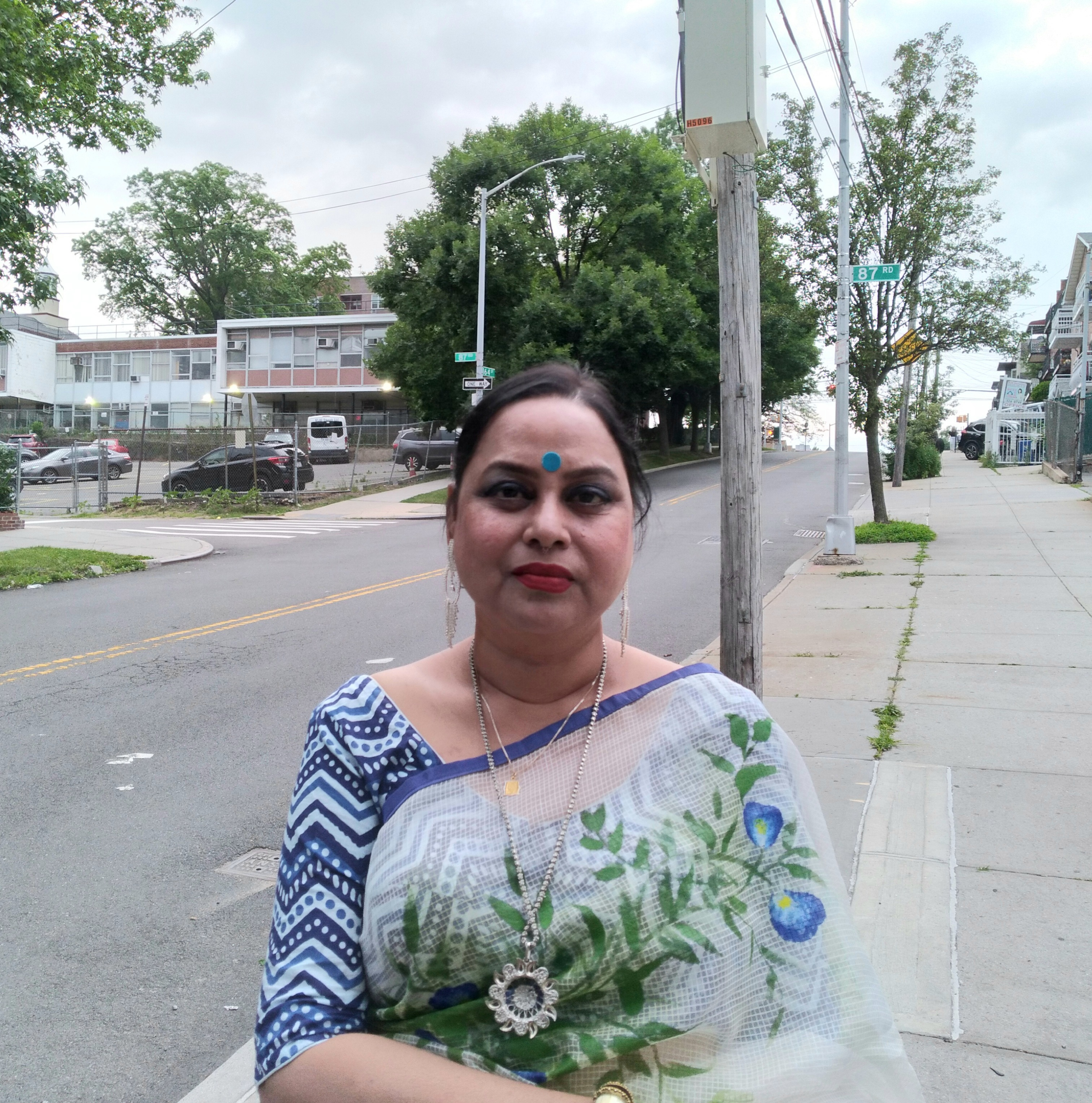
- Born: 11 December 1974 (age 51); Kushtia
- Occupations: Poet, writer

Sultana Firdousi (Bengali: সুলতানা ফিরদৌসি; born: 11 December 1974) is a Bangladeshi writer, poet, scholar.

== Biography ==
Sultana Firdousi was born in the Kushtia District of Bangladesh. Her first book of poetry was published in 1997 by Bangla Academy. She successfully completed a research project at Bangla Academy on Bengali Poetry under the Young Writers Project Dhaka and published first book of poetry Insects Wild flowers, Bengali name – Keet O Drono Puspo by Bangla Academy, Dhaka. Sultana Firdousi has received various awards for writing. Among them, Agniveena award from Santiniketan, India, Ruposhi Bangla Padak from Bengali Kristi ebong Culture Batayan. She was also a member of the Honorary Jury Board of the Calcutta Bangla Academy Poetry Competition. She was working as a socio-economist in the Local Govt Engineering Department (LGED) of Bangladesh.

== Books ==
- Insects and wild flowers, Bengali name - Keet O Drono Puspo (Book of Poems)
- Third Party, Bengali name - Tritiyo Pokkho ( Novel)
- It is the time to return home, Bengali name - Ebar Ghore Pherar Pala (A Collection of Short Stories)
- Trees get drenched, Bengali name - Brikkhera Bheeje Jay (Book of Poems)
- Returning to the forest, Bengali name - Oronne Phire Ashi (Book of Poems)
- A Girl Has No Name (Book of Poems)

== Awards and honors ==
- Agniveena award from Santiniketan, India
- Ruposhi Bangla Padak from Bengali Kristi ebong Culture Batayan.
- She was also a member of the Honorary Jury Board of the Calcutta Bangla Academy Poetry Competition.
