= Ambaria Union, Mirpur =

Ambaria Union আমবাড়ীয়া ইউনিয়ন
- Union
- Location within Bangladesh
- Coordinates: 23.8185°N 88.9912°E
- Country: Bangladesh
- Division: Khulna
- District: Kushtia
- Upazila: Mirpur

Area
  - Total: 55.61 km^{2} (21.47 sq mi)

Population (2011)
  - Total: 27,737
  - Density: 498.8/km^{2} (1,292/sq mi)
- Time zone: UTC+6 (BST)
- Website: ambariaup.kushtia.gov.bd

Ambaria Union (Bengali: আমবাড়ীয়া ইউনিয়ন) is a union parishad situated at Mirpur Upazila, in Kushtia District, Khulna Division of Bangladesh. The union has an area of 19.74 square kilometres (7.62 sq mi) and as of 2001 had a population of 19,012. There are 18 villages and 14 mouzas in the union.
