= Khoksa Upazila =

Khoksa খোকসা
- Upazila
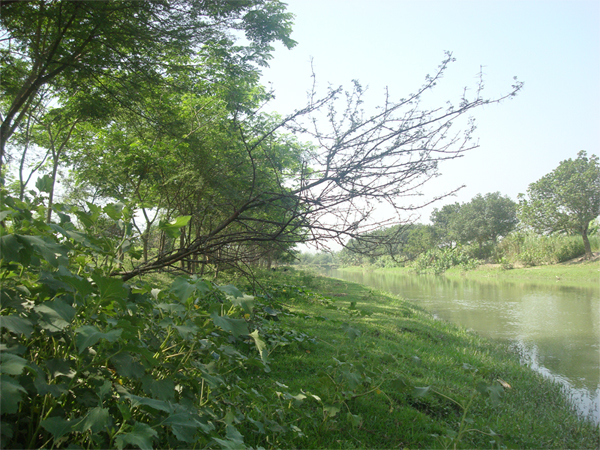
- Canal in Ramnathpur village

- Coordinates: 23°48′N 89°17′E
- Country: Bangladesh
- Division: Khulna
- District: Kushtia
- Headquarters: Khoksa

Government
  - Chairman: Md. Sadar Uddin Khan
  - Vice Chairman: Md. Abu Bakar Siddique
  - Chief Executive Officer: Mezbah Uddin

Area
  - Total: 104.85 km^{2} (40.48 sq mi)

Population (2022)
  - Total: 143,832
  - Density: 1,371.8/km^{2} (3,552.9/sq mi)
- Time zone: UTC+6 (BST)
- Postal code: 7020
- Website: khoksa.kushtia.gov.bd

Khoksa Upazila mauza geocode map

Khoksa (Bengali: খোকসা) is an upazila of Kushtia District in the division of Khulna, Bangladesh.

== Geography ==
Khoksa is located at 23.8000°N 89.2833°E. It has a total area of 104.85 km^{2}. It is bordered by Pangsha Upazila in Rajbari District to the east, Pabna Sadar Upazila of Pabna District to the north, Kumarkhali Upazila to the west and Shailkupa Upazila in Jhenaidah District to the south.

== Demographics ==
Historical population
Year	Pop.	±%
1981	81,879	—
1991	93,371	+14.0%
2001	114,188	+22.3%
2011	129,555	+13.5%
2022	143,832	+11.0%
Source: Bangladesh Bureau of Statistics

Religions in Khoksa Upazila (2022)
Religion	Percent
Islam	91.77%
Hinduism	8.21%
Other or not stated	0.02%

According to the 2022 Bangladeshi census, Khoksa Upazila had 37,402 households and a population of 143,832. 9.27% of the population were under 5 years of age. Khoksa had a literacy rate (age 7 and over) of 68.18%: 69.76% for males and 66.65% for females, and a sex ratio of 97.95 males for every 100 females. 30,689 (21.34%) lived in urban areas.

== Administration ==
Khoksa Upazila is divided into Khoksa Municipality and nine union parishads: Ambaria, Betbaria, Gopagram, Janipur, Jayanti, Khoksa, Osmanpur, Samaspur, and Shimulia. The union parishads are subdivided into 82 mauzas and 103 villages.

Khoksa Municipality is subdivided into 9 wards and 18 mahallas.
