= Kushtia Sadar Upazila =

Kushtia Sadar কুষ্টিয়া সদর
- Upazila
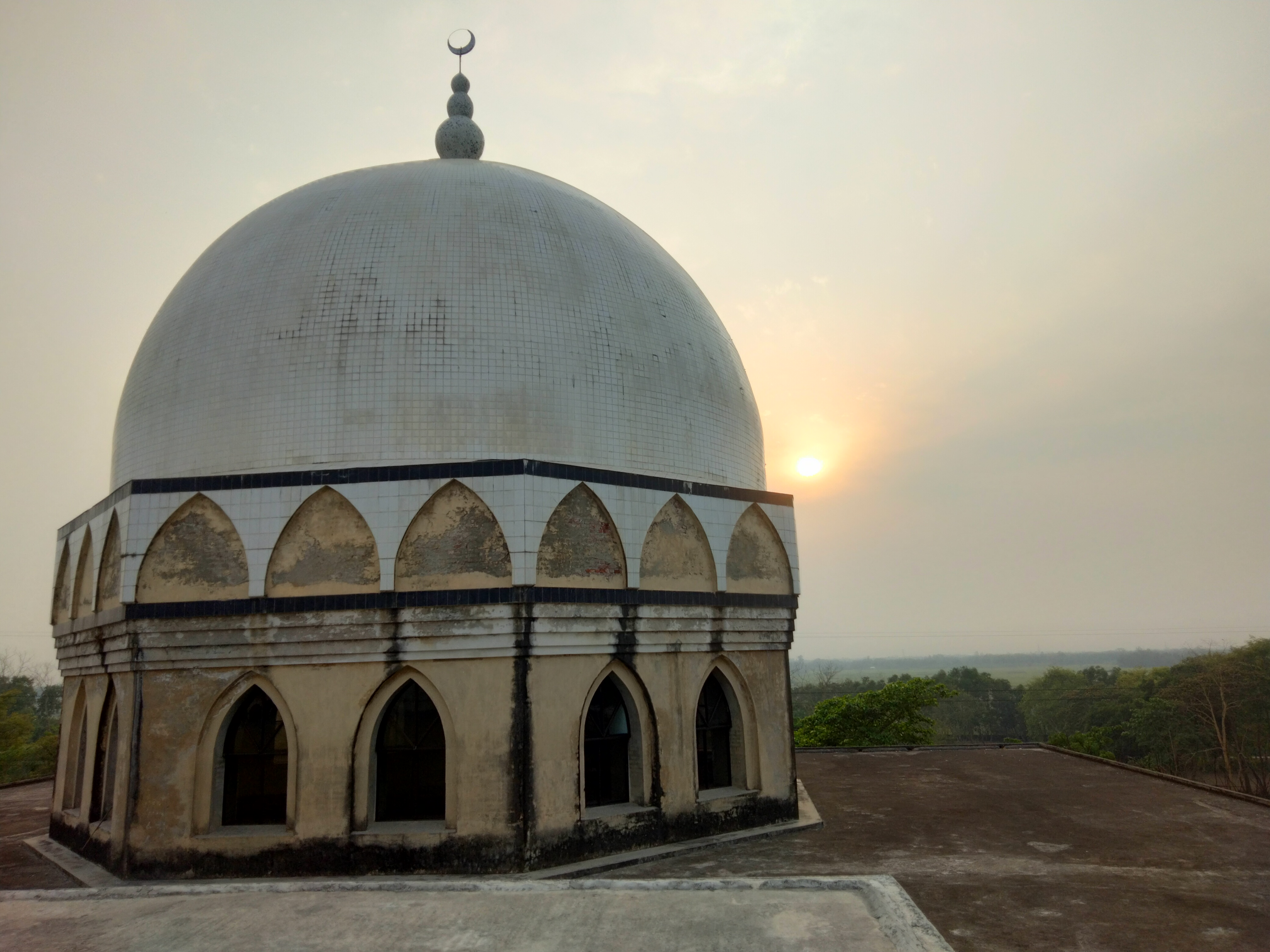
- Dome of Central Mosque, Islamic University

- Coordinates: 23°54′N 89°8′E
- Country: Bangladesh
- Division: Khulna
- District: Kushtia
- Headquarters: Kushtia

Area
  - Total: 318.22 km^{2} (122.87 sq mi)

Population (2022)
  - Total: 560,963
  - Density: 1,762.8/km^{2} (4,565.7/sq mi)
- Time zone: UTC+6 (BST)
- Postal code: 7000
- Area code: 071
- Website: Official Map of Kushtia Sadar

Kushtia Sadar Upazila mauza geocode map

Kushtia Sadar (Bengali: কুষ্টিয়া সদর) is an upazila of Kushtia District in Khulna, Bangladesh. Kushtia Sadar Thana was formed in 1823 and it was turned into an upazila in 1983.

== Demographics ==
Historical population
Year	Pop.	±%
1981	306,827	—
1991	368,774	+20.2%
2001	423,818	+14.9%
2011	502,255	+18.5%
2022	560,963	+11.7%
Source: Bangladesh Bureau of Statistics

Religions in Kushtia Sadar Upazila (2022)
Religion	Percent
Islam	96.19%
Hinduism	3.78%
Other or not stated	0.03%

According to the 2022 Bangladeshi census, Kushtia Sadar Upazila had 145,478 households and a population of 560,963. 8.07% of the population were under 5 years of age. Kushtia Sadar had a literacy rate (age 7 and over) of 74.48%: 76.50% for males and 72.48% for females, and a sex ratio of 99.27 males for every 100 females. 244,152 (43.52%) lived in urban areas.

== Arts and culture ==
International artists have come together at Smaran Matshya Beej Khamar to participate in the annual CRACK International Art Camp since 2007.

== Administration ==
Kushtia Sadar Upazila is divided into Kushtia Municipality and 14 union parishads: Abdulpur, Ailchara, Alampur, Barakhada, Battail, Gosind Durgapur, Harinarayanpur, Hatas Haripur, Jiarakhi, Jhaudia, Mazampur, Monohardia, Patikabari, and Uzangram. The union parishads are subdivided into 122 mauzas and 176 villages and Kushtia Model Thana also is part of local administration as well.

Kushtia Municipality was formed in 1969. The municipality is subdivided into 21 wards and 36 mahallas.

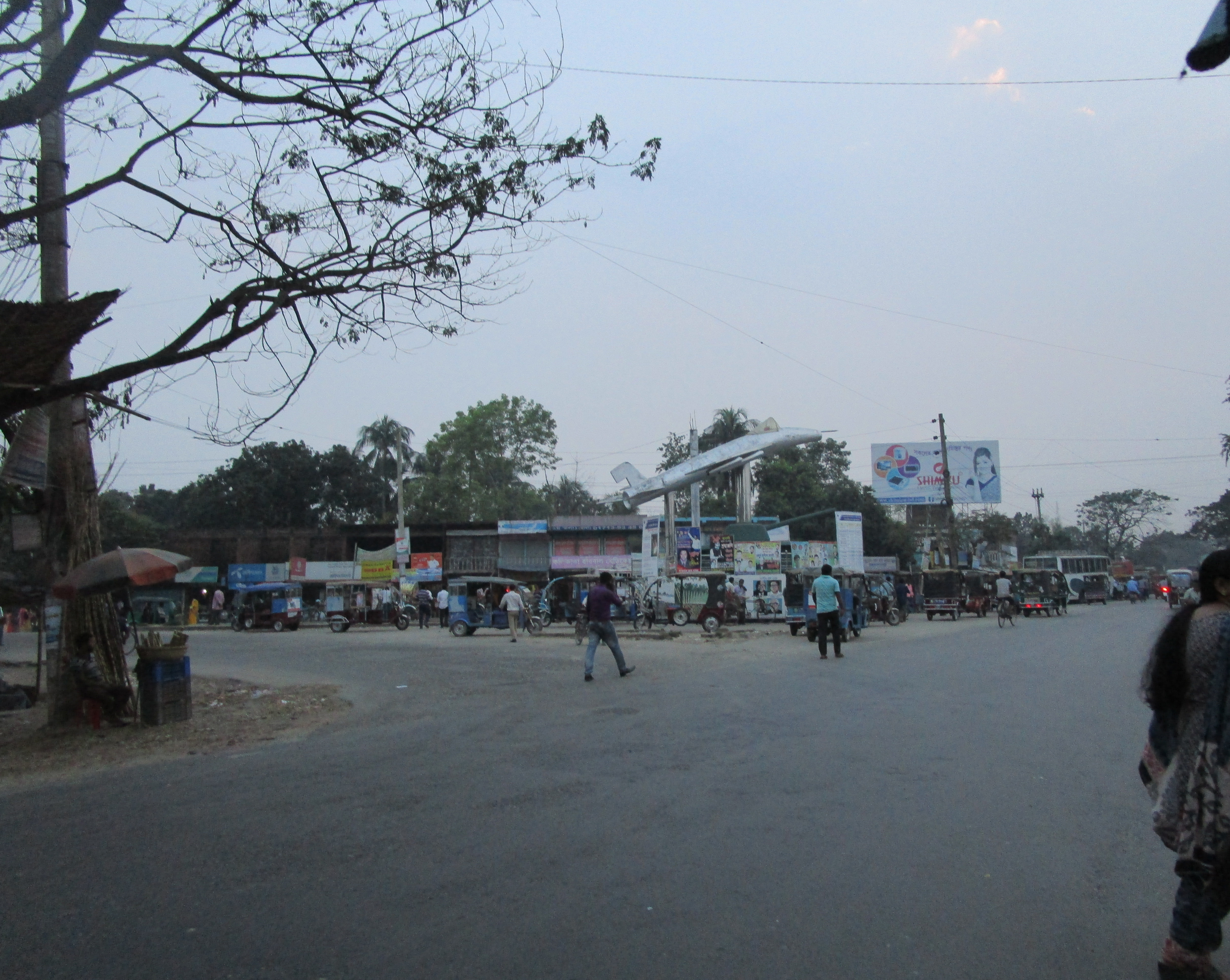
N704 at Chourhas more, Kushtia.

== Education ==
- Islamic University, Kushtia
- Kushtia Medical College
- Kushtia Zilla School
- Harinarayanpur M. L High School
- Kuatul Islam Kamil Madrasah
- Kushtia Government Technical School and College
- Technical Training Center, Kushtia
- Goswami Durgapur High School
- Kaburhat High School
- Kushtia Government College
- Kushtia Islamia College
- Ail Chara Secondary School
- Khorda ail Chara High School
- Khejurtola Patikabari High School
- Kushtia Govt. Central College
- Chand Sultana Secondary Girls' School
- Kushtia Government Girls' School
- Kalakakoli High School

== See also ==
- Upazilas of Bangladesh
- Districts of Bangladesh
- Divisions of Bangladesh
- Islamic University, Kushtia
- Administrative geography of Bangladesh
