= Daulatpur Upazila, Kushtia =

Daulatpur দৌলতপুর (কুষ্টিয়া)
- Upazila
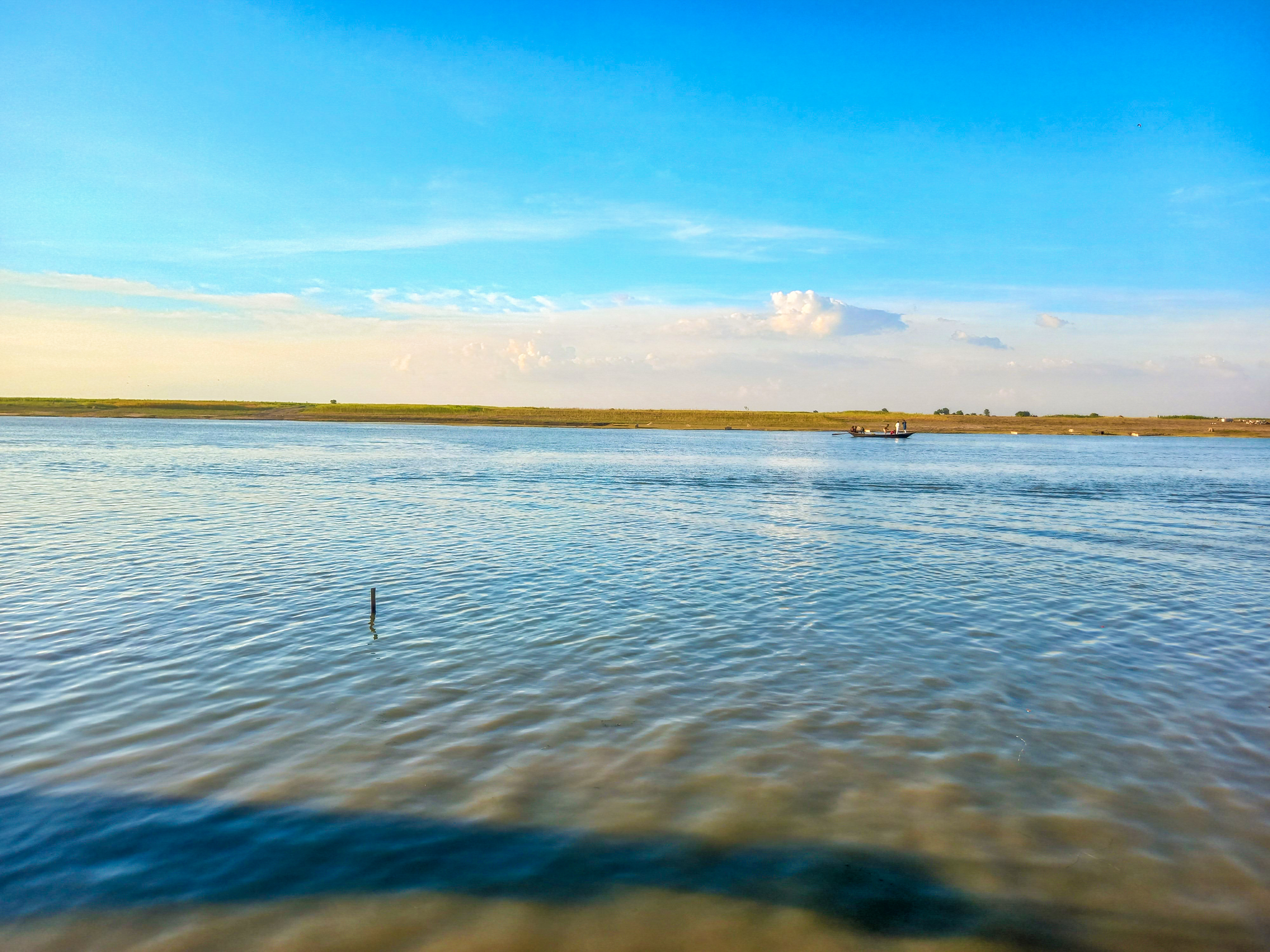
- Padma river at Mohishkundi

- Coordinates: 24°0.1′N 88°52.5′E
- Country: Bangladesh
- Division: Khulna
- District: Kushtia
- Headquarters: Daulatpur

Area
  - Total: 468.76 km^{2} (180.99 sq mi)

Population (2022)
  - Total: 482,981
  - Density: 1,030.3/km^{2} (2,668.6/sq mi)
- Time zone: UTC+6 (BST)
- Postal code: 7050
- Area code: 071
- Website: Official Map of Daulatpur

Daulatpur (Bengali: দৌলতপুর (কুষ্টিয়া)) is an upazila of Kushtia District in the Division of Khulna, Bangladesh. Daulatpur Thana was formed in 1854. It became an upazila in 1983.

== Geography ==
Daulatpur is located at 24.0014°N 88.8750°E. It has 115,715 households and total area 468.76 km^{2}.

Daulatpur Upazila is bounded by Bagha Upazila in Rajshahi District and Lalpur Upazila in Natore District, on the north, Bheramara and Mirpur Upazilas on the east, Gangni Upazila in Meherpur District and Mirpur Upazila in Kushtia District, on the south, and Jalangi CD Block, in Murshidabad district, West Bengal, India, and Karimpur I and Karimpur II CD Blocks, Nadia district, West Bengal, on the west.

== Demographics ==
Religions in Daulatpur Upazila (2022)
Religion	Percent
Islam	99.99%
Hinduism	0.01%
Other or not stated	0.00%

According to the 2022 Bangladeshi census, Daulatpur Upazila had 132,529 households and a population of 482,981. 8.65% of the population were under 5 years of age. Daulatpur had a literacy rate (age 7 and over) of 64.88%: 66.18% for males and 63.67% for females, and a sex ratio of 95.02 males for every 100 females. 36,842 (7.63%) lived in urban areas.

Top Places by Population
Place	Count	Percent
Khalishakundi	16,019	3.32%
Mahishkundi	12,983	2.69%
Mathurapur	10,328	2.14%
Philipnagar	9,487	1.96%
Goalgram	9,103	1.88%

== Administration ==
Daulatpur Upazila is divided into 14 union parishads: Adabaria, Ariaa, Boalia, Chilmari, Daulatpur, Hogalbaria, Khalishakundi, Maricha, Mathurapur, Pearpur, Philipnagar, Pragpur, Ramkrishnapur, and Refaitpur. The union parishads are subdivided into 82 mauzas and 103 villages.
