= Kumarkhali Upazila =

Kumarkhali কুমারখালি (কুষ্টিয়া)
- Upazila
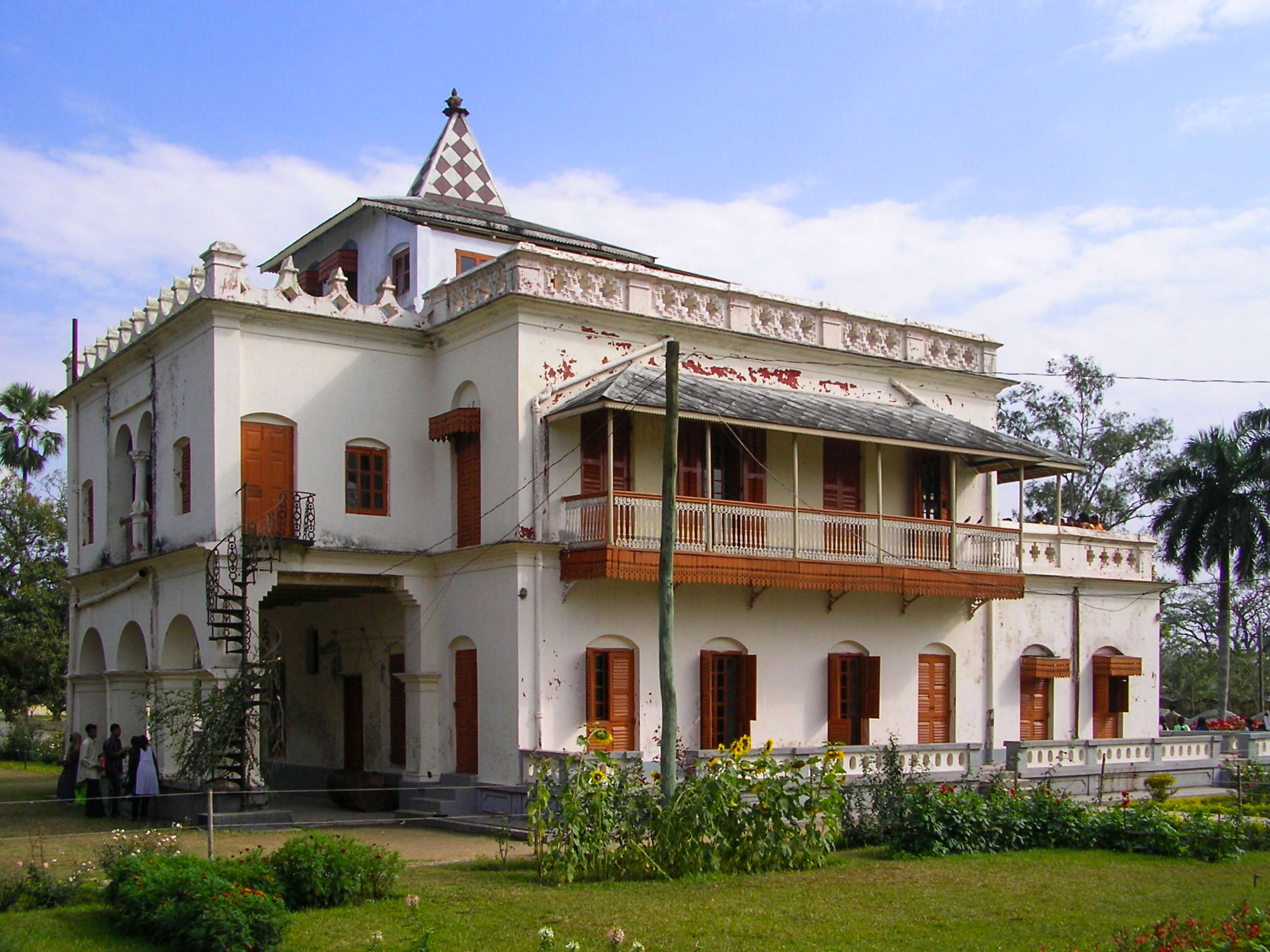
- Shilaidaha Kuthibari, the famous residence of Rabindranath Tagore, is located at Kumarkhali

- Coordinates: 23°51′15.12″N 89°14′30.12″E
- Country: Bangladesh
- Division: Khulna
- District: Kushtia
- Headquarters: Kumarkhali

Area
  - Total: 258.18 km^{2} (99.68 sq mi)

Population (2022)
  - Total: 373,752
  - Density: 1,447.6/km^{2} (3,749.4/sq mi)
- Time zone: UTC+6 (BST)
- Postal code: 7010
- Area code: 071
- Website: kumarkhali.kushtia.gov.bd

Kumarkhali (Bengali: কুমারখালি) is an upazila of Kushtia District in the Division of Khulna, Bangladesh. It is famous for the Shelaidaha area, where the poet Rabindranath Tagore spent a considerable time of his youth.

Kumarkhali Upazila mauza geocode map

== Geography ==
Kumarkhali is located at 23.8542°N 89.2417°E. It has a total area 258.18 km^{2}.

It is bounded by Pabna Sadar Upazila and the Padma River on the north; Shailkupa Upazila on the south; Khoksa Upazila on the east; and Kushtia Sadar Upazila on the west.

== Demographics ==
Historical population
Year	Pop.	±%
1981	231,662	—
1991	269,008	+16.1%
2001	297,728	+10.7%
2011	328,457	+10.3%
2022	373,752	+13.8%
Source: Bangladesh Bureau of Statistics

Religions in Kumarkhali Upazila (2022)
Religion	Percent
Islam	97.22%
Hinduism	2.78%

According to the 2022 Bangladeshi census, Kumarkhali Upazila had 95,089 households and a population of 373,752. 9.31% of the population were under 5 years of age. Kumarkhali had a literacy rate (age 7 and over) of 68.18%: 69.13% for males and 67.25% for females, and a sex ratio of 97.45 males for every 100 females. 46,059 (12.32%) lived in urban areas.

== Administration ==
Kumarkhali Thana was formed in 1855 consisting of 13 parganas and it was upgraded into a Sub Division of Pabna District in 1857. In 1871 Kumarkhali Sub Division was abolished and it was included in Kushtia Sub Division under Nadia District. Kumarkhali Thana was turned into an upazila in 1983. Besides, Kumarkhali Municipality, formed in 1869, is one of the earliest municipalities of the undivided Bengal.

The upazila is divided into Kumarkhali Municipality and 11 union parishads: Bagulat, Chandpur, Chapra, Jadu Boyra, Jagannathpur, Kaya, Nandalalpur, Panti, Sadaki, Sadipur, and Shelaidaha. The union parishads are subdivided into 187 mauzas and 201 villages.

Kumarkhali Municipality is subdivided into 9 wards and 17 mahallas.

== Notable people ==
- Nawabzada Syed Mir Mosharraf Hossain [Lahinipara] (1847–1911), novelist, playwright and essayist
- Shamsuddin Ahmed [Sultanpur] (1889–1969), lawyer and politician
- Raquibunnesa Mahmuda Khatun Siddiqua Batashi [Niamatbari] (1906–1977), poet and essayist
- Akbar Hossain [Kaya] (1917–1981), novelist
- Abdur Rouf [Bashgram] (1954), politician
- Shahid Mohammad Golam Kibria [Batikamara] (died 1974), founding president of Kumarkhali Awami League and freedom fighter
- Abul Hossain Tarun [Batikamara] (died 1997), politician
- Sultana Tarun [Batikamara] (born 1955), politician
- Selim Altaf George [Batikamara] (born 1975), politician

== See also ==
- Upazilas of Bangladesh
- Districts of Bangladesh
- Divisions of Bangladesh
