= Kushtia District =

Kushtia district কুষ্টিয়া জেলা
- District of Bangladesh
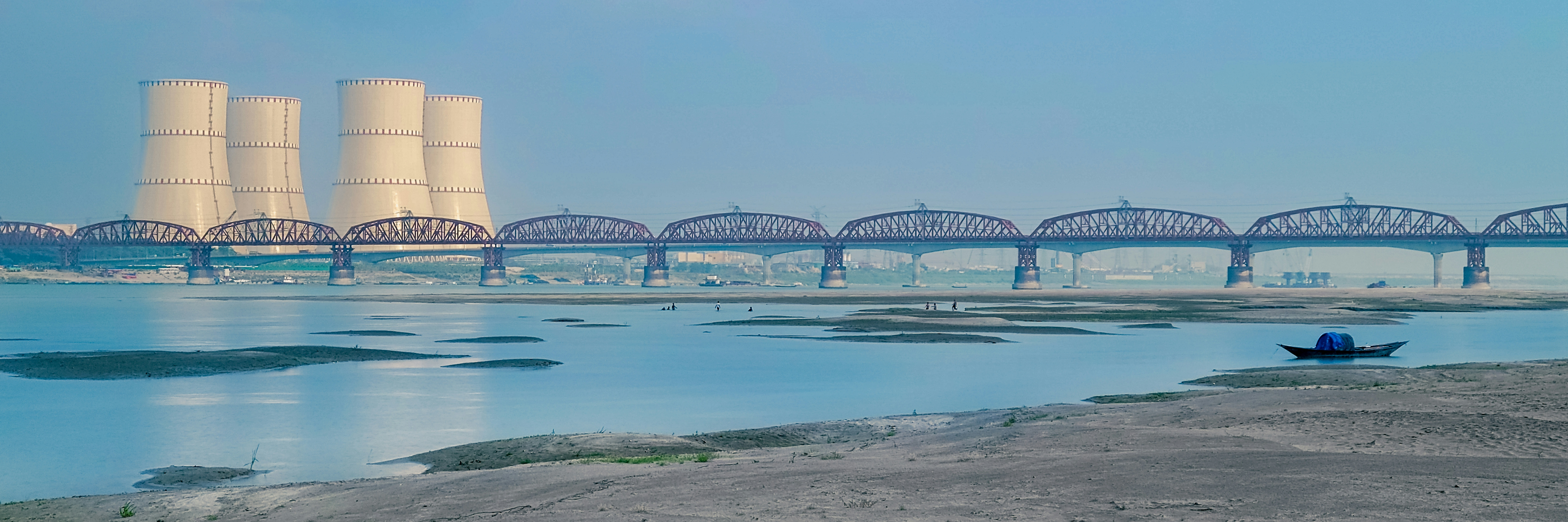
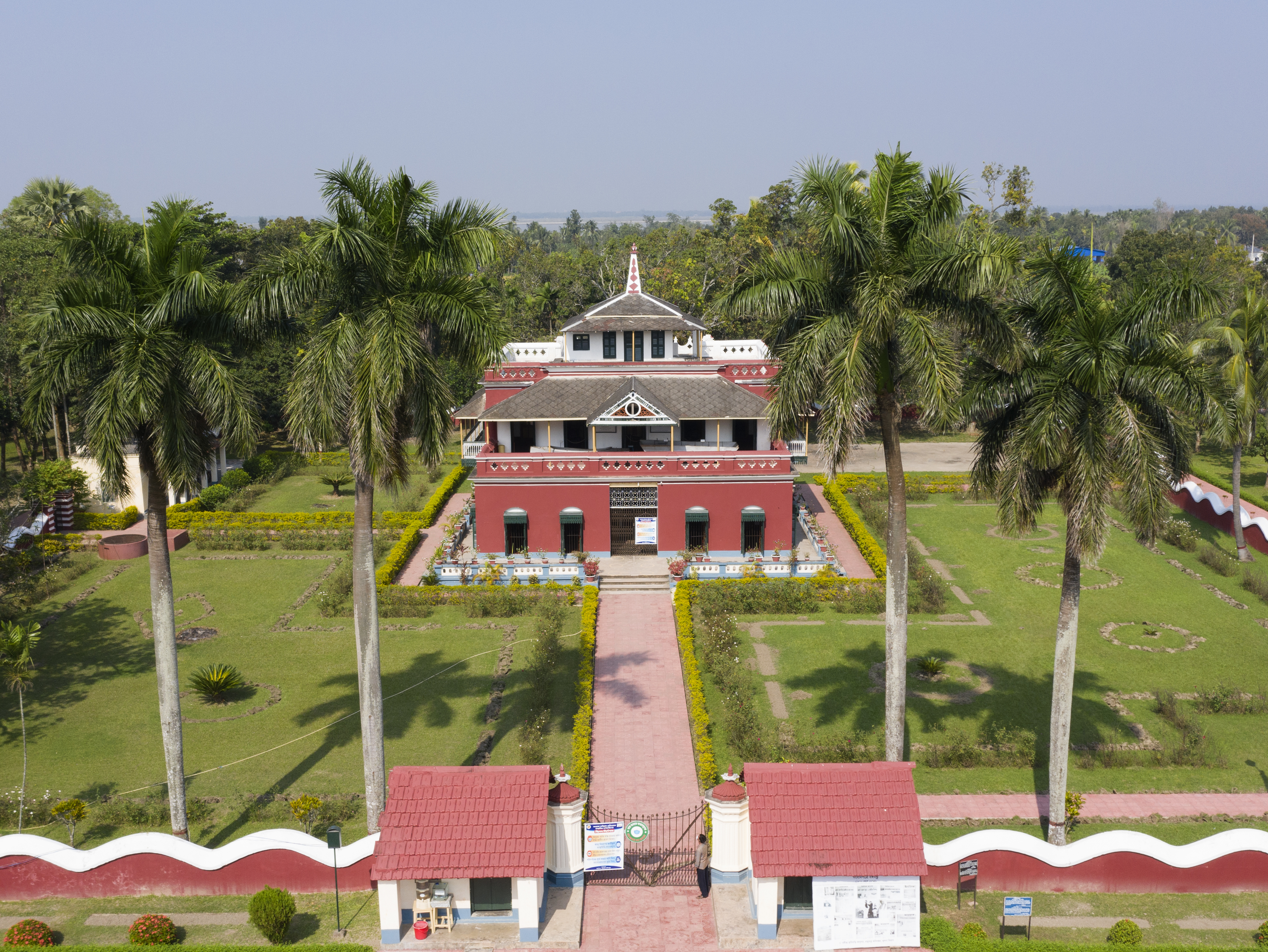
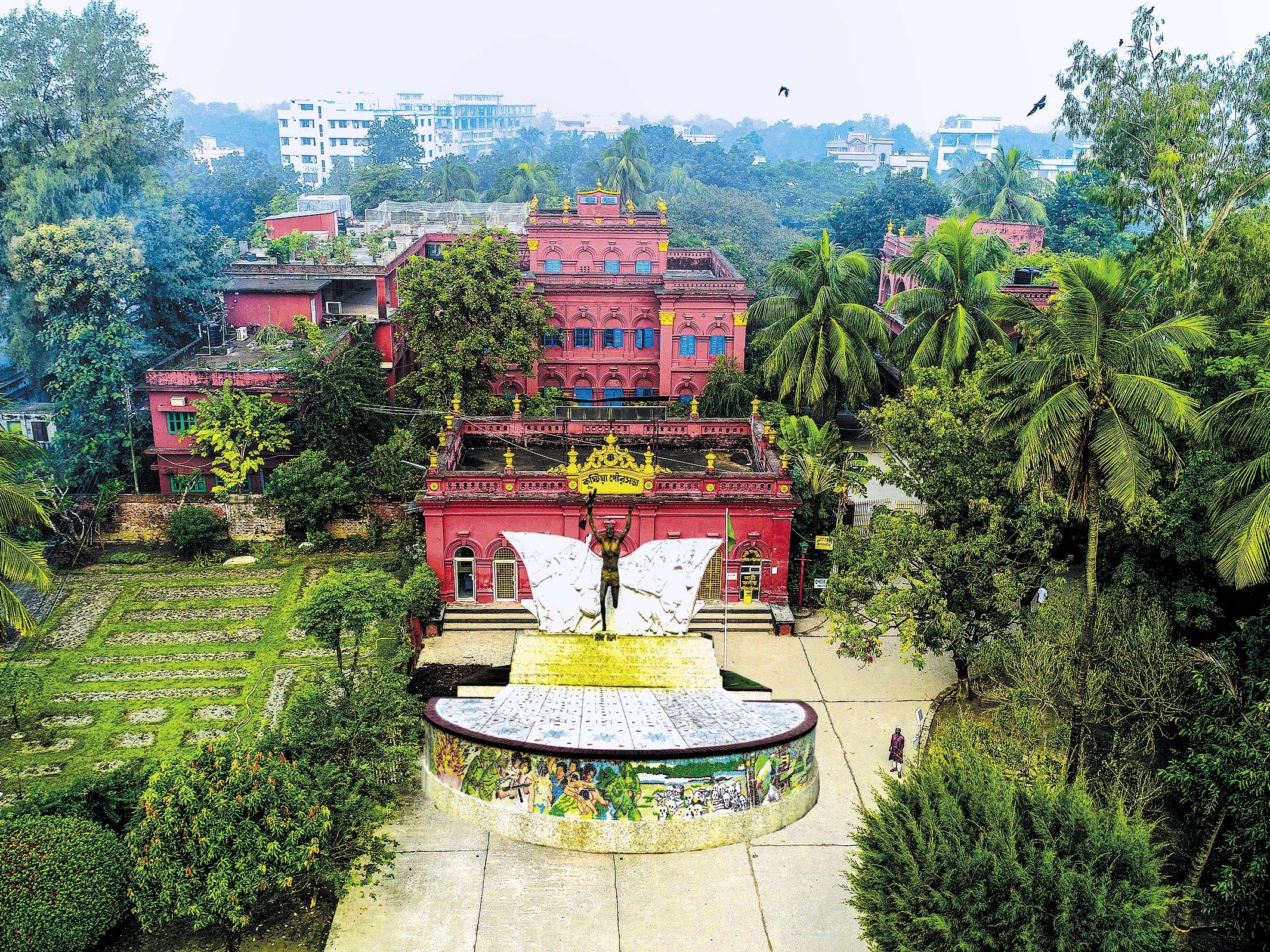
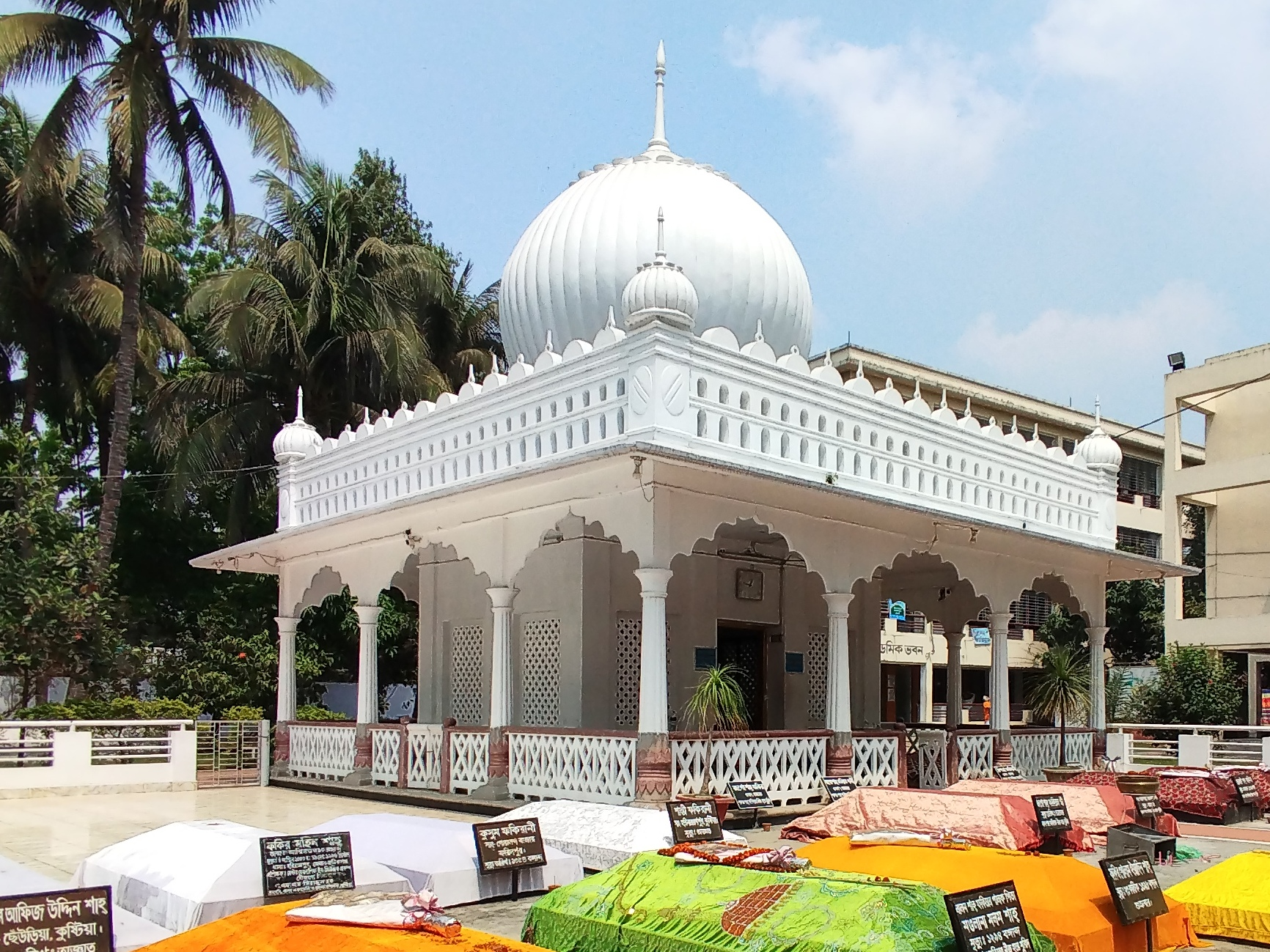
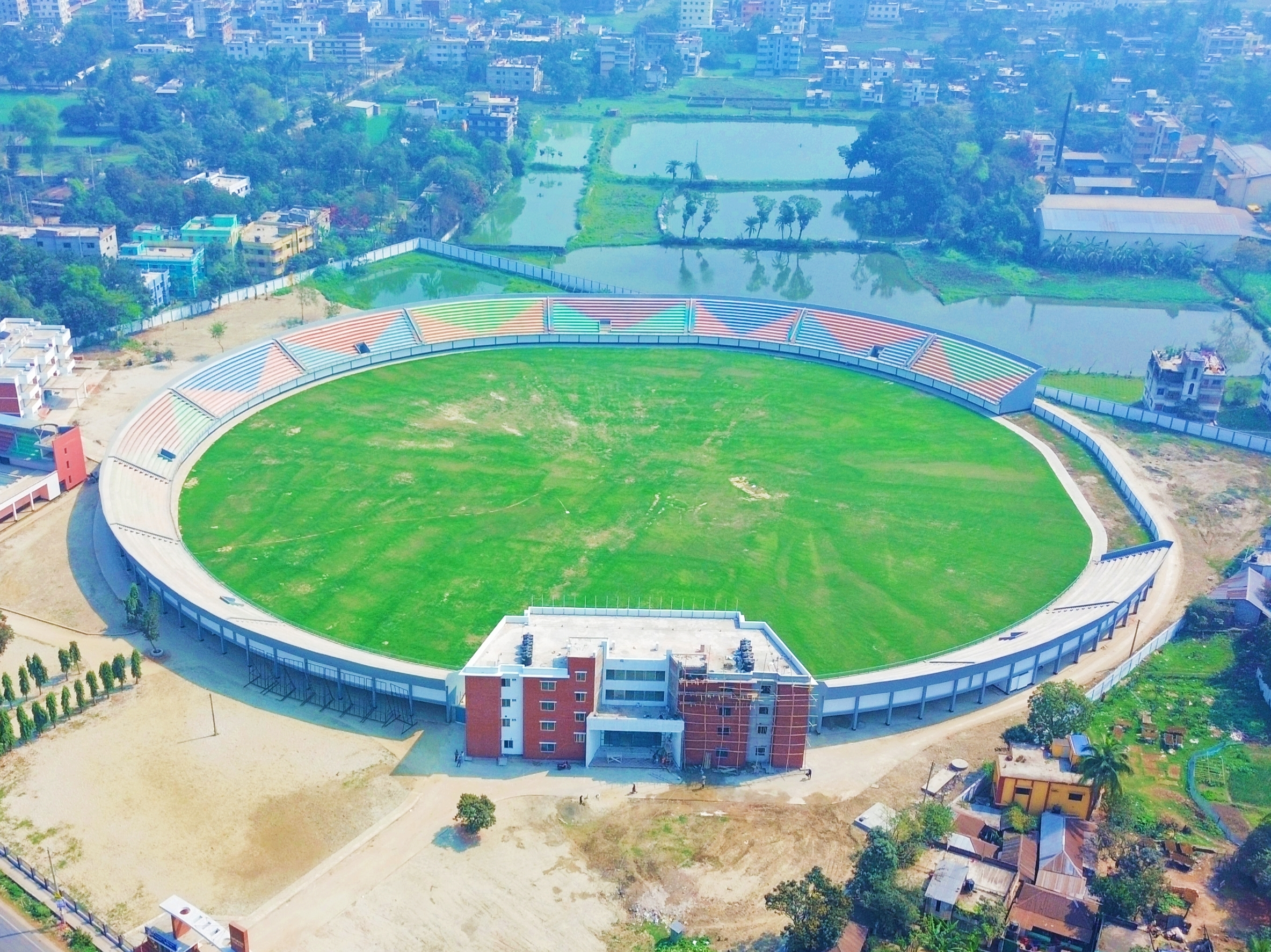
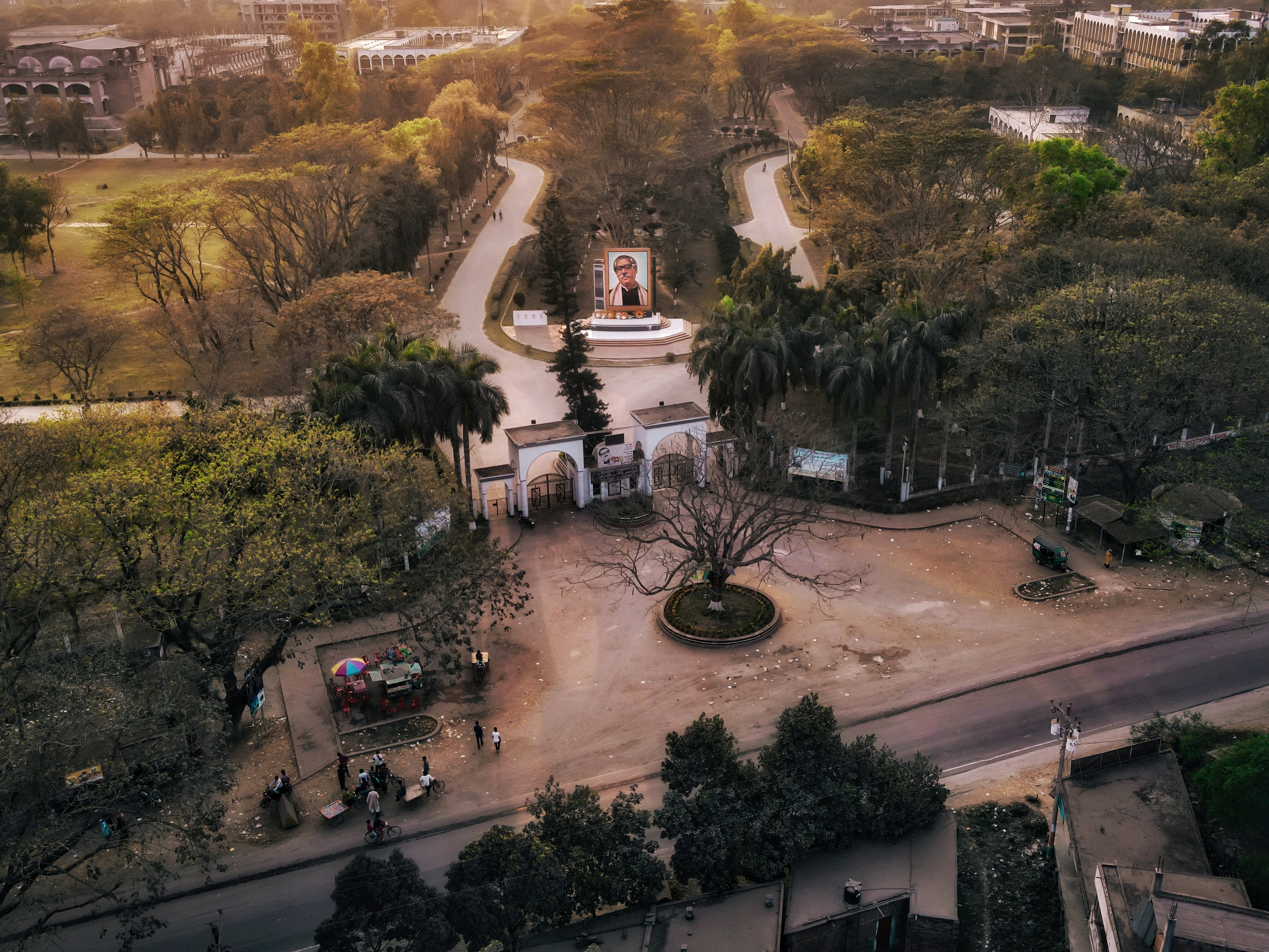
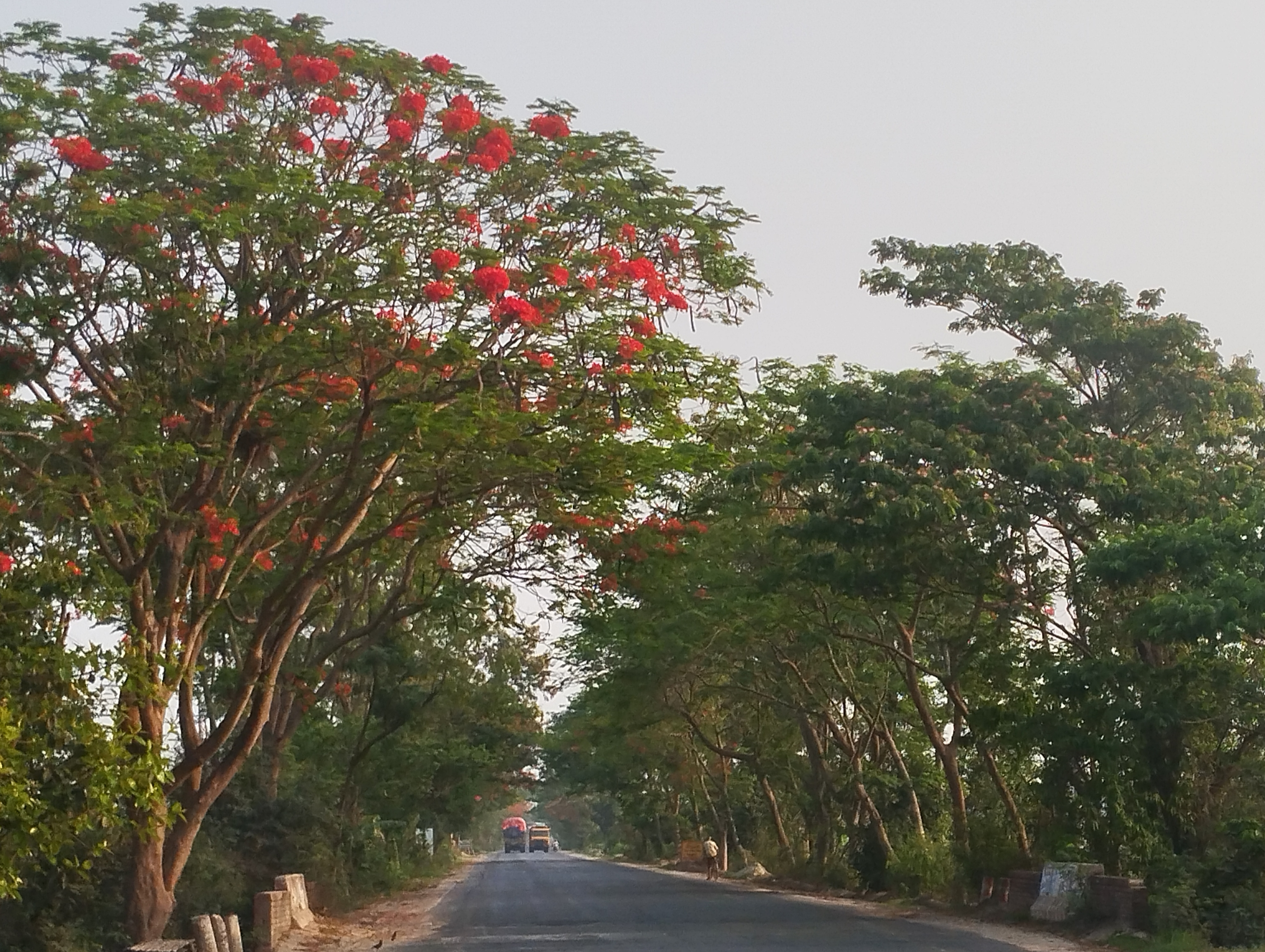
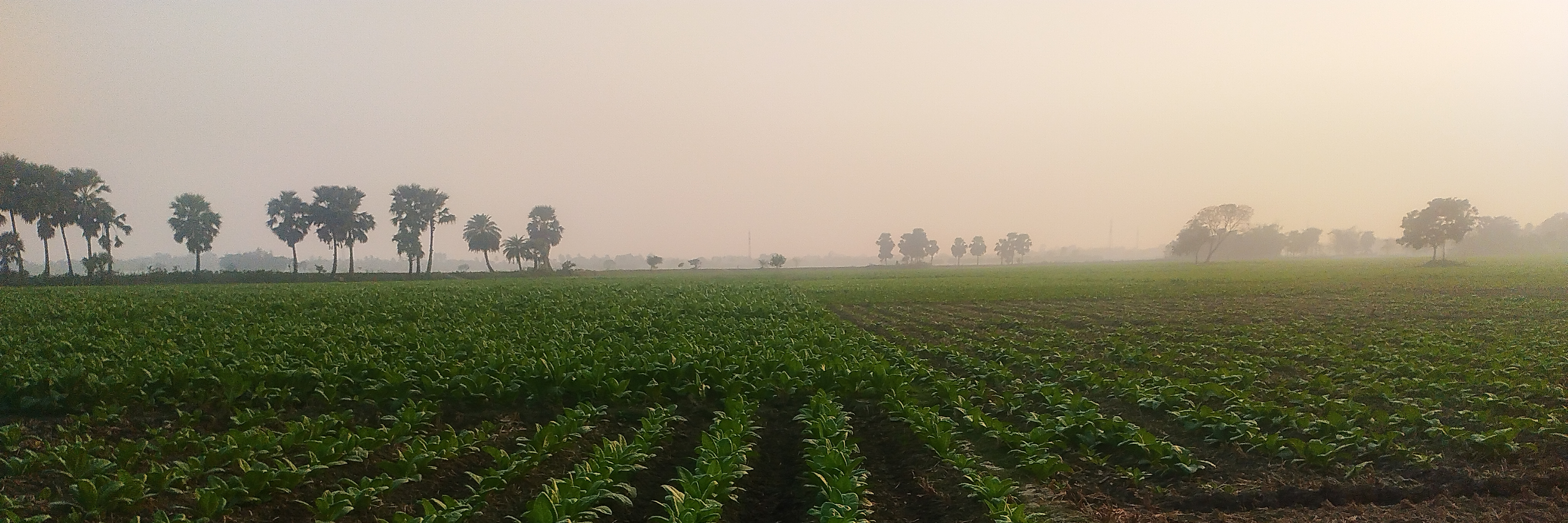
- Hardinge Bridge and Rooppur Power Plant Shilaidaha Kuthibari Municipal Building Lalon Majar Kushtia Stadium IU Kushtia Bypass Tobacco cultivation in Mirpur Upazila

- Location of Kushtia District in Bangladesh
- Interactive map of Kushtia district
- Coordinates: 23°55′11″N 89°13′12″E
- Country: Bangladesh
- Division: Khulna
- Headquarters: Kushtia

Government
  - Deputy Commissioner: Md. Ehtesham Reza
  - District Council Chairman: Rabiul Islam
  - Chief Executive Officer: Md. Joynul Abedin

Area
  - Total: 1,608.78 km^{2} (621.15 sq mi)

Population (2022)
  - Total: 2,149,692
  - Density: 1,336.22/km^{2} (3,460.81/sq mi)
- Time zone: UTC+06:00 (BST)
- Postal code: 7000
- Area code: 071
- ISO 3166 code: BD-30
- HDI (2019): 0.644 medium · 5th of 20
- Website: www.kushtia.gov.bd

Kushtia District (Bengali: কুষ্টিয়া জেলা; pronounced [kuʃʈi̯a‿d͡ʒela]) is an administrative district of the Khulna Division in southwestern Bangladesh. It is also known as the capital of literature and culture. The Padma River flows along its northern side, while the Mathabhanga and Ichamati River flow along its western side. Shilaidaha Rabindra Kuthibari, associated with the memories of Rabindranath Tagore and Mausoleum of Lalon Shah are among the major attractions of the district.

In 2014, Kushtia District received the National Primary Education Award at the divisional level and the National Information and Communication Technology Award in the Best Deputy Commissioner category. In 2015, it received the Best Digital Service Award. The district's Tiler Khaja (2023) and Kumarkhali Bedsheet (2024) received recognition as geographical indications.

== History ==
Kushtia district was formerly the eastern part of Nadia district, and was the heart of the ancient region of Vanga. Ruled originally by the Palas and Senas, Kushtia fell under Muslim rule with the capture of Nabadwip by Bakhtiyar Khilji. Kushtia remained an integral part of the Bengal Sultanate and Mughal Empire, initially being part of the Sarkar of Mahmudabad in the Bengal Subah. Kushtia was made part of Nadia district during British rule.

In 1860, the Indigo revolt spread throughout the Bengal province. Shalghar Madhua in Kushtia district was one of the forerunners in this movement. It inspired all indigo farmers in Kushtia to refrain from paying government taxes. Subsequently, with the publication of the Indigo Commission Report, an act was passed prohibiting coercion of cultivators for indigo cultivation and the measure led to the end of the movement.

During the Partition of India in 1947, three sub-divisions of Nadia district i.e. Kushtia, Chuadanga and Meherpur were made into a new district of Kushtia in the then East Pakistan. The town once again became attractive for development in 1954 with the establishment of the Ganges-Kobadak Irrigation Project (also known as G-K Project) headquarters and a number of government offices. The G-K Project is a large surface-irrigation system, with the first crop under this project grown in 1962–63.

The district of Kushtia had significant contribution to the Bangladesh Liberation War. A 147-member company of the 27th Baloch Regiment of the Pakistan Army reached Kushtia on 25 March 1971 from its base at Jessore cantonment. They initially captured the local police station and settled an outpost there, but soon faced considerable resistance from a group of police, ansars, students and local people. By 1 April, the Pakistani army was completely overpowered and the Mukti Bahini took control of Kushtia and emerged victorious in the Battle. Later on 17 April 1971 the Bangladesh Government in-exile formally announced Proclamation of Independence at Baidyanathtala. Subsequently, battles between the Pakistan Army and the rebels occurred at many places of the district including Bangshitala of Kumarkhali Upazila, and Daulatpur Upazila.,

After the independence of Bangladesh several different development projects were undertaken in the district of Kushtia. On 22 November 1979 the foundation stone of The Islamic University was laid at Shantidanga – Dulalpur under the districts of Kushtia and Jhenidah. However, In 1982 the university was shifted to Gazipur and admission of students began in the session of 1985–86. Later, on 10 January 1990, the university shifted back to its original site at Shantidanga Dulalpur. In 1984, two subdivisions of Kushtia, Chuadanga and Meherpur, were named separate districts.

== Geography ==
Kushtia District has an area of 1608.80 square kilometres and is bounded by Rajshahi, Natore, Pabna districts to the North, by Chuadanga, Jhenaidah districts to the South, by Rajbari District to the East, and by West Bengal and Meherpur District to the West.

Ganges, Gôŗai-Modhumoti, Mathabhanga, Kaligônga, and Kumar are the main rivers flowing through the district. The average high temperature is 37.8 °C and the average low is 9.2 °C. Annual rainfall averages 1,467 millimetres.

== Administrative divisions ==
Kushtia District upazila geocode map

Kushtia district is divided into 6 upazilas, 7 police stations, 5 municipalities, 67 union councils, 710 mauzas and 979 villages.

No.	Upazila	Area (sq km)	Population (people) Census-2022	Constituency	Union
01	Kushtia Sadar Upazila	316.26	5,60,952	Kushtia-3	14
02	Kumarkhali Upazila	258.38	3,73,734	Kushtia-4	11
03	Khoksa Upazila	115.60	1,43,827	Kushtia-4	09
04	Mirpur Upazila	296.31	3,63,080	Kushtia-2	13
05	Bheramara Upazila	153.72	2,25,041	Kushtia-2	06
06	Daulatpur Upazila	461	4,82,965	Kushtia-1	14

== Demographics ==
Historical population
Year	Pop.	±% p.a.
1974	1,022,781	—
1981	1,236,135	+2.74%
1991	1,502,126	+1.97%
2001	1,740,155	+1.48%
2011	1,946,868	+1.13%
2022	2,149,692	+0.91%

According to the 2022 Census of Bangladesh, Kushtia District had 565,339 households and a population of 2,149,692 with an average 3.77 people per household. Among the population, 363,166 (16.89%) inhabitants were under 10 years of age. The population density was 1336 people per km^{2}. Kushtia District had a literacy rate (age 7 and over) of 69.01%, compared to the national average of 74.80%, and a sex ratio of 1036 females per 1000 males. Approximately, 21.26% of the population lived in urban areas. The ethnic population was 2,117.

Religions in Kushtia District (2022)
Religion	Percent
Islam	97.25%
Hinduism	2.73%
Other or not stated	0.02%

Religion in present-day Kushtia District
Religion	1941 (Note: Kushtia subdivision of Nadia district)		1981		1991		2001		2011		2022	
Religion	Pop.	%	Pop.	%	Pop.	%	Pop.	%	Pop.	%	Pop.	%
Islam	381,261	73.48%	1,164,423	94.20%	1,437,896	95.72%	1,682,154	96.67%	1,888,744	97.01%	2,090,622	97.25%
Hinduism	137,422	26.49%	70,654	5.72%	63,382	4.22%	57,241	3.29%	56,792	2.92%	58,771	2.73%
Others (Note: Including Jainism, Christianity, Buddhism, Zoroastrianism, Judaism, Ad-Dharmis, or not stated)	178	0.03%	1,058	0.08%	848	0.06%	760	0.04%	1,332	0.07%	299	0.02%
Total Population	518,861	100%	1,236,135	100%	1,502,126	100%	1,740,155	100%	1,946,868	100%	2,149,692	100%

In 2011, Muslims formed 97.01% of the population, Hindus 2.92%, and others 0.06%. The absolute number of Hindus has fallen continuously from 1981 to 2011, before increasing slightly from 2011 to 2022.

In 2001, Kushtia District had a population of 1,740,155, of which 50.86% are male and 49.14% female. In terms of religion, 96.67% dwellers of Kushtia were Muslims, 3.29% follow Hinduism and other religions make up 0.04%. Religious institutions are mosques 3587, temples 300, churches 256.

== Tourism ==
The Shilaidaha Rabindra Kuthibari is an ancestral mansion of the erstwhile Tagore Zamindari.The Kuthibari, located at Shilaidaha in Kumarkhali Upazila of the Kushtia district, is only 20 km from Kushtia town. Rabindaranath Tagore lived here for part of his life, and wrote many memorable poems there. The Kuthibari is now a museum, and is cared for by the Archaeological Department of Bangladesh.

The shrine of Lalon Fakir, the founder of the Baul order, is located in Cheouria, about 2 km east of the Kushtia railway station. The famous Tiler Khaja Factory is just beside the Milpara Rail Gate in Kushtia Town.

== Notable people ==
- Lalon, mystic poet, philosopher, social reformer
- Bagha Jatin, revolutionary and martyr
- Surendranath Dasgupta, Sanskrit scholar
- Radhabinod Pal, Indian judge
- Kangal Harinath, journalist, writer, poet and Baul singer
- Qazi Motahar Hossain, writer, scientist, statistician, chess player, and journalist
- Sultana Firdousi, writer and poet
- Aminul Haque Badsha, first deputy press secretary.
- Rashid Askari, professor of English; former vice chancellor, Islamic University, Bangladesh; and former director general, Bangla Academy

== See also ==
- Faridpur District
- Districts of Bangladesh
- Dhaka Division
