= Kangal Harinath Memorial Museum =

- কাঙাল হরিনাথ স্মৃতি জাদুঘর
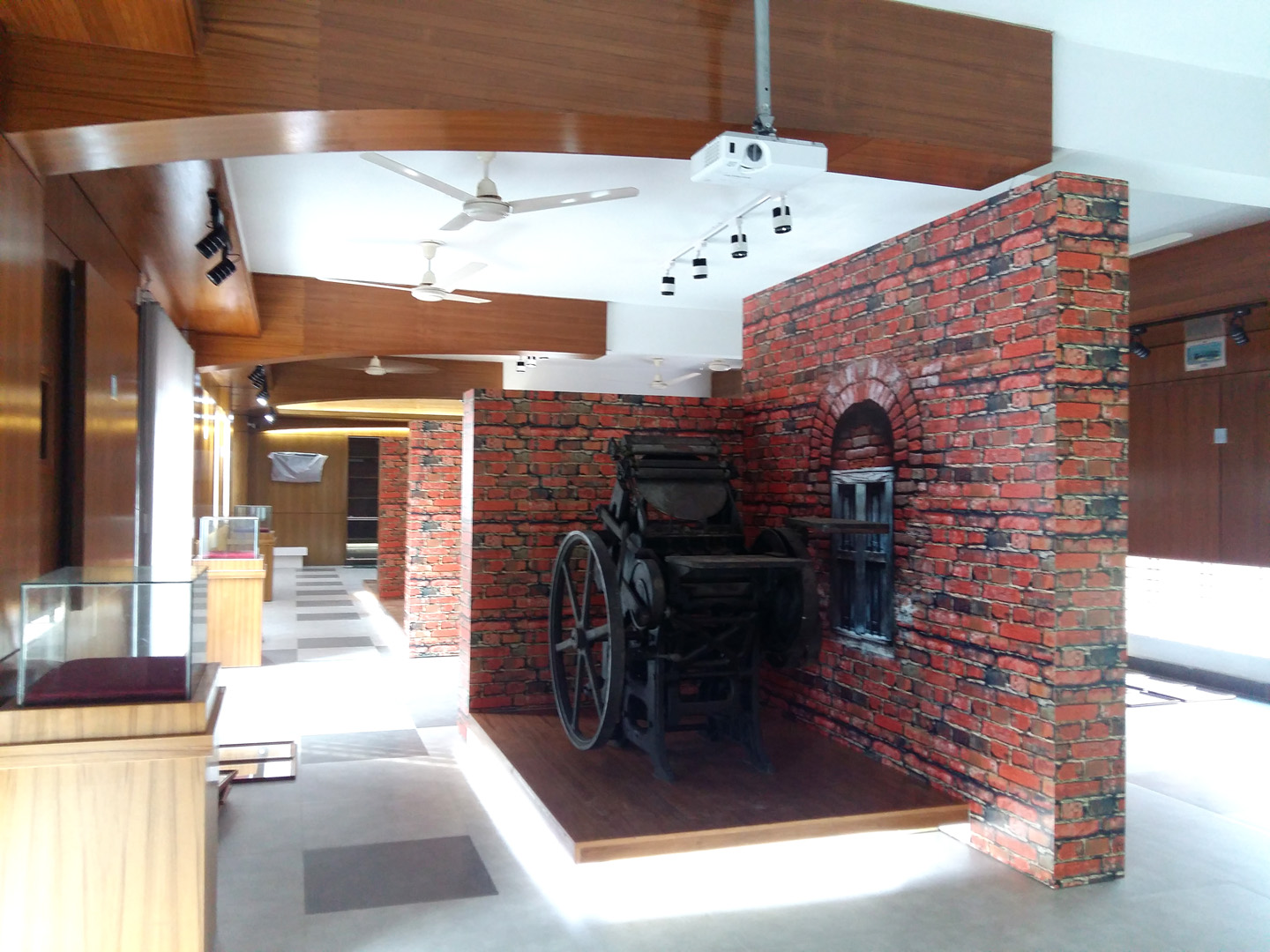
- A view of the interior of Kangal Harinath Museum
- Established: 2013; 12 years ago
- Location: Kumarkhali, Kushtia District
- Coordinates: 23.8558946°N 89.2368468°E
- Type: Memorial museum
- Founder: Bangladesh National Museum
- Nearest parking: Next door (no charge)
- Website: kangalharinath.org.bd

Kangal Harinath Memorial Museum (Bengali: কাঙাল হরিনাথ স্মৃতি জাদুঘর) is a memorial museum in Kumarkhali city of Kumarkhali Upazila of Kushtia District. The museum has been established in memory of Kangal Harinath Majumdar, editor of Gram Barta Prokashika and poet, a native of Kushtia District. The museum was opened to visitors in 2017.

== History ==
The museum was inaugurated in 2013 through a video conference under the priority project of the then Prime Minister of Bangladesh, Sheikh Hasina, in view of the long-standing demands of Kushtia residents to preserve the memory of Harinath Majumdar's life. The museum is a branch museum under the control of the Bangladesh National Museum under the Ministry of Culture. The Kangal Harinath Memorial Museum was opened to the public on 9 December 2017.

== Kangal Harinath ==
Harinath Majumdar (July 22, 1833 – April 16, 1896) was one of the bearers and bearers of Bengali folk culture in the 19th century. He was one of the pioneers of Baul music. He was popularly known as Fakir Chand Baul. Moreover, he is also famous for publishing Gram Barta Prokashika.

== Museum infrastructure ==
The main building of the museum is a two-storied building.

Conference room on the ground floor, small auditorium, adjacent library. The museum is located on about 9.5 acres (3.8 ha) land.

== Collection ==
The collection of the museum contains Harinath Majumdar's well-arranged manuscripts, poems, writing drafts, newspaper covers, various printing tools, several wooden blocks etc. The museum has 170 artifacts in a gallery.

The printing press used by Harinath Majumdar in the early days of the establishment of the museum was not housed in the museum. When asked why the printing press was not given to the museum, Harinath's fifth descendant Ashok Majumdar's wife Geeta Majumdar said,

In this regard, I have informed the Ministry of Culture in writing. I have some issues, they have been informed.

Later on 16 July 2023, the printing press (Gram Barta Prokashika ) was placed in the museum. At this time the printing press was brought from Bastuvita to the museum. According to National Museum Authority sources, Dipankar Majumdar, the fifth descendant of Harinath Majumdar, signed as the number 1 witness to the formality of handing over the contract and journalist KMR Shaheen signed the second witness.
