= Jaladhar Sen =

Bengali writer

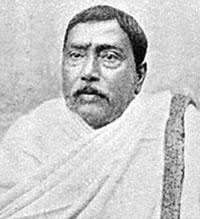
- Portrait of Jaladhar Sen
- Born: 13 March 1860; Kumarkhali, Bengal Presidency, British India
- Died: 15 March 1939 (aged 79); Calcutta, Bengal Presidency, British India
- Occupations: Poet, educationist
- Writing career
- Years active: 1900–1939
- Period: Bengal Renaissance

Rai Bahadur Jaladhar Sen (13 March 1860 – 15 March 1939) was a Bengali writer, poet, editor, philanthropist, traveler, social worker, educationist, and littérateur. He was awarded the title Ray Bahadur by the British government.

== Education and personal life ==
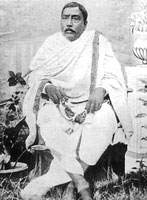
Jaladhar Sen

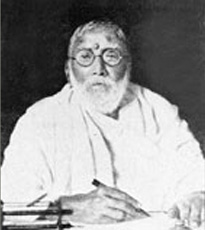
Jaladhar Sen in old age

Jaladhar Sen was born in the Kumarkhali village of Nadia District (presently known as Kusthia District of Bangladesh) in a Dakshin-Rarhiya Kayastha family. His family originally hailed from Deganga, North 24 Parganas District of present-day West Bengal (India). His great-grandfather migrated to Kumarkhali to work as a diwan under the East India Company. They were known as "Degangar Sen" (Sens of Deganga). His father, Sri Haladhar Sen, was an eminent person in society. His father died when Jaladhar was only three years old. He appeared in the Minor Examination in 1871 from Goalanda Bengali school and received a scholarship. In 1878 Jaladhar passed the Entrance Examination from Kumarkhali English High School, and got admission to the General Assembly Institution in Calcutta in the First Arts (FA) course. Though his formal education could not progress further, he continued self-study and became an eminent littérateur of the Bengal Renaissance period. In 1883 Jaladhar joined Goalanda High School in Rajabari, Faridpur, in the post of third teacher with a salary of 25 rupees.

In 1885, Jaladhar married Smt. Sukumary Debi, daughter of Ambia Charan Mitra of Nadia and great-great-granddaughter of Raghu Nandan Mitra, Dewan of Maharaja Krishna Chandra of Nadia.

After a few years, Jaladhar suffered the greatest loss in his life. During this time his mother, wife, and daughter died in quick succession. In 1887 his newborn daughter died on the twelfth day of her life. His wife also died in another twelve days. Within three months he lost his mother. Unable to bear with the grief, Jaladhar left for the Himalayas and became a Paribrajak Sadhu (traveler-saint). In 1891 he came back from the Himalayas and joined as a teacher in Mahishadal Raj School. He remarried Smt. Haridasi Debi of the Datta family of Usti in 1893. In 1899 he left his teaching job and shifted to Calcutta to explore a new profession - journalism.

== Profession ==
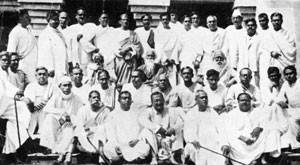
Jaladhar Sen with Rabindranath Tagore, Manmatha Nath Ghosh, Ramananda Chattopadhyay and others on 14 March 1037 (১৩৪৩ বঙ্গাব্দের ৩০ ফাল্গুন) at Rabibasar, Shantiniketan

Jaladhar joined বঙ্গবাসী (Bangabasi - a weekly newspaper) as an editorial assistant. Then he joined হিতবাদী (Hitabadi - a weekly newspaper) as an editor and continued till 1907. He left Calcutta for a brief period and worked in the estate of Zamindar of Santosh in Tangail, firstly as a home tutor, and then as manager. Here he had written his travelogue to the Himalayas. In 1911 he came back to Calcutta and joined a government-funded Bengali daily, সুলভ সমাচার (Sulabh Samachar), as editor. In 1913 he joined মাসিক ভারতবর্ষ (Masik Bharatbarsha - a monthly published Bengali compilation) as editor along with Amulyacharan Bidyabhushan, which was published from the house of Gurudas Chattopadhyay in Cornwallis Street, and continued for the next 26 years till he died. He was also associated as editor with newspapers গ্রামবার্তা প্রকাশিকা (Grambarta Prakashija) and বসুমতী (Basumati).

== Literary creation ==
Jaladhar Sen wrote about 42 books, including novels, travelogues, social messages, books for children, and biographies. Story books - নৈবেদ্য (Naibedyo), কাঙালের ঠাকুর (Kangaler Thakur), বড় মানুষ (Baro Manush) etc.; Novels - দুঃখিনী (Dukkhini) (1909), অভাগী (Aubhagi) (3 parts, 1915–32), উৎস (Utsa) (1932) etc.; Travelogue - প্রবাস-চিত্র (Prabas Chitra) (1899) and হিমালয় (Himalaya) (1900); Children's literature - সীতাদেবী (Sita debi), কিশোর (Kisgore), শিব সীমন্তিনী (Shib Simantini), মায়ের পূজা (Mayer Puja), আফ্রিকায় সিংহ শিকার (Afrikay Singha Shikar), রামচন্দ্র (Ramchandra), আইসক্রিম সন্দেশ (Ice cream Sondesh) etc.; and Biography - কাঙাল হরিনাথ (Kangal Harinath) (2 parts, 1913, 1914), are worth to be mentioned. Kangal Harinath was the biography of Sri Harinath Majumdar, editor of Grambarta Prakashika, who was his teacher in the Goalanda School, and a philosopher and a guide to Jaladhar Sen. He also edited many books.

His travelogue titled "হিমালয়" (Himalaya) was an account of his perilous journey to the Himalayas, which appeared in Bengali literary periodical "ভারতী" (Bharati) in installments during a span of about two years in 1903-04 while Smt Sarala Debi was the editor. It became extremely popular and sensitized Bengali society. Later it was published as a book in 1916 in Calcutta. This book, later, was included in the list of textbooks for Calcutta University. "Himalaya" was one of the pioneering literary works written in Bengali in the genre of travelogue, with an account of travel to the Himalayas, and contemporary to "Himaranya" written by Swami Ramananda Bharati describing his experience of travel to Kailsh and Manas Sarovar, published during 1901–02 in the Bengali literary magazine সাহিত্য "Sahitya", and followed by several noted Bengali travelogues writers in later years, such as Umaprasad Mukhopadhyay, Shanku Maharaj etc. to popularize travel and expedition to Himalayas in Bengali society and psyche.

== Acquaintances, friends, and personalities ==
Lalan Fakir (Lalan Shah)

Jaladhar was acquainted with Lalan Shah (or Lalan Fakir) through his mentor Kangal Harinath (Harinath Majumdar). In his memoirs he wrote:

"একবার গ্রীষ্মের অবকাশের সময়ে শ্রীমান অক্ষয়কুমার মৈত্রেয় বাড়িতে (কুমারখালীতে) আসিয়াছেন। ... সেদিন প্রাতঃকালে লালন ফকির নামক একজন ফকির কাঙালের (কাঙাল হরিনাথ) সহিত সাক্ষাৎ করিতে আসিয়াছিল। লালন ফকির কুমারখালীর অদূরবর্তী কালীগঙ্গার তীরে বাস করিতেন। তাঁহার অনেক শিষ্য ছিল। তিনি কোন সম্প্রদায়ভুক্ত ছিলেন, তাহা বলা বড় কঠিন, কারণ তিনি সকল সম্প্রদায়ের অতীত রাজ্যে পৌঁছাইয়া ছিলেন। তিনি বক্ত্রিতাও করিতেন না, ধর্মকথাও বলিতেন না। তাঁহার এক অমোঘ অস্ত্র ছিল, তাহা বাউলের গান।.. ".

Kangal Harinath and the Phikir Chand Fakir Movement

Harinath Majumdar, alias Kangal Harinath, was a close acquaintance of Haladhar Sen, father of Jaladar. Harinath had remarkable influence in Jaladhar's life, starting from the moment of his birth, when Harinath attributed the name Jaladhar to him. During the 1880s, when Harinath was editing and publishing "Grambarta" from his residence at Kumarkhali village, many young men were attracted to him, and a social group was formed. During this time Akshay Kumar Maitreya proposed the formation of a performing artists' forum (বাউলের দল) with Jaladhar and other close friends to compose and perform "Baul" songs, a form of folk music of Bengal. Akshay Kumar Maitreya, Prafulla Chandra Gangopadhyay with his brother Banwarilal and cousin brother Nagendranath, Jaladhar Sen himself, and many others under the patronage of Harinath formed this group. Collectively they created many Baul songs and used a common pseudonym, ফিকির চাঁদ ফকির (Phikir Chand Fakir), used in the last stanza of most of the songs. Soon the group became very popular, and a devotional movement was observed to be sweeping in many places far and near. This group was most probably the first of its kind in Bengal, which is known as Band in the present day. Some of the early creations of Baul song, by this group are noted under:

"ভাব মন দিবা নিশি, অশিবনাশী, সত্যপথের সেই ভাবনা" written by Akshay Kumar
"আমি করবো এ রাখালী কতকাল" written by Harinath
"ভাবী দিন কি ভয়ঙ্কর ভেবে একবার দ্যাখ রে আমার মন পামরা" written by Prafulla Chandra
"দ্যাখ দেখি ভেবে ভেবে, কেবা রবে, যে দিন সে তলব দিবে" written by Prafulla Chandra
"বল কে চিনিবে আর, মন রে তোমার, মনের মাঝে রোগের হাঁড়ি" written by Harinath .. etc.

Dwijendralal Ray

In 1878, Jaladhar appeared in the entrance examination, and for that purpose he had to travel to Krishna Nagar, the district headquarters, from his village, Kumarkhali. His elder brother could manage to gather only four rupees for the purpose of his trip. Jaladhar had only a "dhuti and chador" as his dress, and had neither a shirt nor shoes. After a short rail journey, he had to walk down to Krishna Nagar from Bogula in the last leg of the journey. There, on the day of the examination, he met Dwijendralal Ray, who also appeared for the examination in the same year. The remarkable event that led to a long and deep friendship between the two was described by Jaladhar in his own words in his memoirs:

"একটি ফুটফুটে গৌড় বর্ণ ছেলে, আমারই বয়সী, আমি যে গাছতলায় বসে ছিলাম সেই দিকে এলো। সে যে বড়োমানুষের ছেলে তা তার পোশাক পরিচ্ছদ দেখেই বুঝতে পারলাম। ছেলেটি সোজা আমার কাছে এসে জিজ্ঞাসা করল, " ভাই তোমার নাম কি জলধর সেন? তুমিই কি কুমারখালী স্কুল থেকে এক্জামিন দিতে এসেছো?" ... after a brief talk Jaladhar asked, "ভাই, তুমি এতো কথা বললে, তোমার নামটি তো জানতে পারলাম না?" ছেলেটি হেসে বলল, "নাম বললে তো চিনতে পারবে না, তবে বাপের নাম বললে হয়তো চিনতে পার। আমার নাম দ্বিজেন্দ্রলাল রায়। আমি কৃষ্ণনগরের রাজার দাওয়ান কার্তিকেয়চন্দ্র রায় মহাশয়ের ছেলে।"

Dwijendralal went to England for higher studies, and after his return, joined the government service, while Jaladhar continued as a schoolteacher. They met again during 1895–96 in Mahishadol. Dwijendralal was posted in Tamluk as the settlement officer and Jaladhar was the schoolteacher of Mahishadol at that time. In later days when both of them were in Calcutta, on many occasions Dwijwendralal used to say:

" জলধরবাবু আর আমি একই ব্রাকেটে। এ ব্রাকেট ভাঙবে না।"

In 1913 Dwijendralal initiated publication of a literary magazine in Bengali, (Bharat Barsha) as an editor. He died unexpectedly on 17 May 1913, and Jaladhar Sen was appointed as the editor along with Amulya Charan Bidya Bhushan in the first year. After a year, Amulya Charan left, and Upendra Krishna Bandyopadhyay joined as co-editor. In the third year, Upendra too left. Jaladhar continued as the editor of (Masik Bharat Barsha) for twenty-two years.

Swami Vivekananda

Jaladhar Sen mentioned in the memoir আত্মজীবনী ও স্মৃতি—তর্পণ about his chance meeting with Swami Vivekananda during his wandering days in the Himalayas:

"আমি তখন হিমালয়ের মধ্যে ঘুরে বেড়াচ্ছি। কালীকান্ত সেন নামে বরিশাল জেলাবাসী এক শিক্ষিত ভদ্রলোক ডেরাডুনে এক ইংরাজি স্কুল খুলেছিলেন। আমি ঘুরতে ঘুরতে হিমালয়ের মধ্যে গিয়ে সর্বপ্রথম ডেরাডুনের এই মাস্টারজীর আশ্রয় লাভ করি। .. এক শনিবার বেলা একটা কি দুটোর সময় লাঠি আর কম্বল নিয়ে নগ্নপদে বেরিয়ে পড়ি। সেদিন আমার লক্ষ্যস্থান ছিল হৃষিকেশ। .. সন্ধ্যার পূর্বেই হৃষিকেশে পৌঁছই। হৃষিকেশে তখন সন্ন্যাসীদের আহার যোগাবার জন্য গুটি দুই তিন সদাব্রত ছিল। এখন কি হয়েছে জানিনে। সেই সদাব্রতর লোকরা হৃষিকেশের গঙ্গার চড়ার ওপর ঘাস পাতা বাঁশ খড় দিয়ে ছোট ছোট কুটির তৈরি করে রাখতো। সন্ন্যাসীরা এসে সেইসব কুটিরে বাস করতেন। কাউকে কোনো কথা জিজ্ঞাসা করতে হতো না। প্রতিদিন দ্বিপ্রহরে সন্ন্যাসীরা সদাব্রতের সুমুখে গিয়ে উপস্থিত হতেন। সদাব্রতের লোকেরা দুখানি মোটা রুটি আর খোসাসুদ্ধ কলায়ের ডাল আর কখন কখন বা তার সঙ্গে একটু নুন আর লঙ্কাও দিতেন। সন্ন্যাসীরা তাই দিয়ে গঙ্গার ধরে বসে আহার করতেন তারপর অঞ্জলি পুরে জলপান করতেন। আমার যদিও তখন লম্বা চুল ও দাড়ি কম্বল ও লাঠিমাত্র সম্বল তাহলেও আমি কখনো হৃষিকেশের কোনো কুটিরে আশ্রয় গ্রহণ করিনি। সন্ন্যাসীর আসন আমি অধিকার করবো কেন? আমি সদাব্রতের বারান্দাতেই কি শীত কি গ্রীষ্ম পড়ে থাকতাম। ... সন্ধ্যার প্রাক্কালে হৃষিকেশে ঘুরতে ঘুরতে একটি কুটিরের সামনে দেখি জন তিন চার বাঙ্গালী সন্ন্যাসী সেখানে দাঁড়িয়ে আছেন। তাদের মুখে প্রবল উৎকণ্ঠা দেখে আমি হিন্দিতেই জিজ্ঞাসা করলাম, কি হয়েছে? তাঁরা বললেন - স্বামী বিবেকানন্দ নামে একজন সন্ন্যাসী মৃত্যুশয্যায়। ..."

Rajanikanta Sen

Rajanikanta Sen was very close to Jaladhar Sen. One of such many incidents was cited by Jaladhar Sen himself:

"তখন স্বদেশীর বড় ধূম। এক দুপুরে আমি বসুমতী আফিসে বসে আছি, এমন সময় রজনী (রজনীকান্ত সেন) ও রাজশাহীর অক্ষয়কুমার মৈত্রেয় (Akshay Kumar Maitreya) এসে উপস্থিত। রজনী সেই দিনই দার্জিলিং মেলে বেলা এগারোটা নাগাদ কলকাতায় পৌঁছে অক্ষয়কুমারের মেসে উঠেছিলেন। মেসের ছেলেরা জেদ ধরেছেন একটি গান লিখে দেওয়ার জন্য। গানের নামে রজনী পাগল হয়ে যেতেন। গানের মুখরা ও একটি অন্তরা লিখে দাঁড়িয়ে পড়লেন। সকলে গান শোনার জন্য ব্যাকুল হয়ে উঠল। বললেন, 'এই তো গান হইয়াছে, এ বার জলদা'র কাছে যাই। একদিকে গান কম্পোজ হউক, আর একদিকে লেখা হউক।' আমি দেখে বললাম, আর কই? রজনী বলিল, 'এইটুকু কম্পোজ কর, বাকিটুকু হইয়া যাইবে।' সত্যি কম্পোজ আরম্ভ হইল আর অন্য দিকে গান লেখাও শেষ। আমি আর অক্ষয় সুর দিলাম। গান ছাপা হয়ে এল। এই গান ঘিরে ছেলেদের মধ্যে সেকি উন্মাদনা! স্বদেশ প্রেমে উদ্বুদ্ধ গানটি সর্বজনমনে স্পর্শ করে গেল।"

The song was "মায়ের দেওয়া মোটা কাপড় মাথায় তুলে নে রে ভাই" (Mayer deoa mota kapor mathay tule ne re bhai).

Surendranath Roy

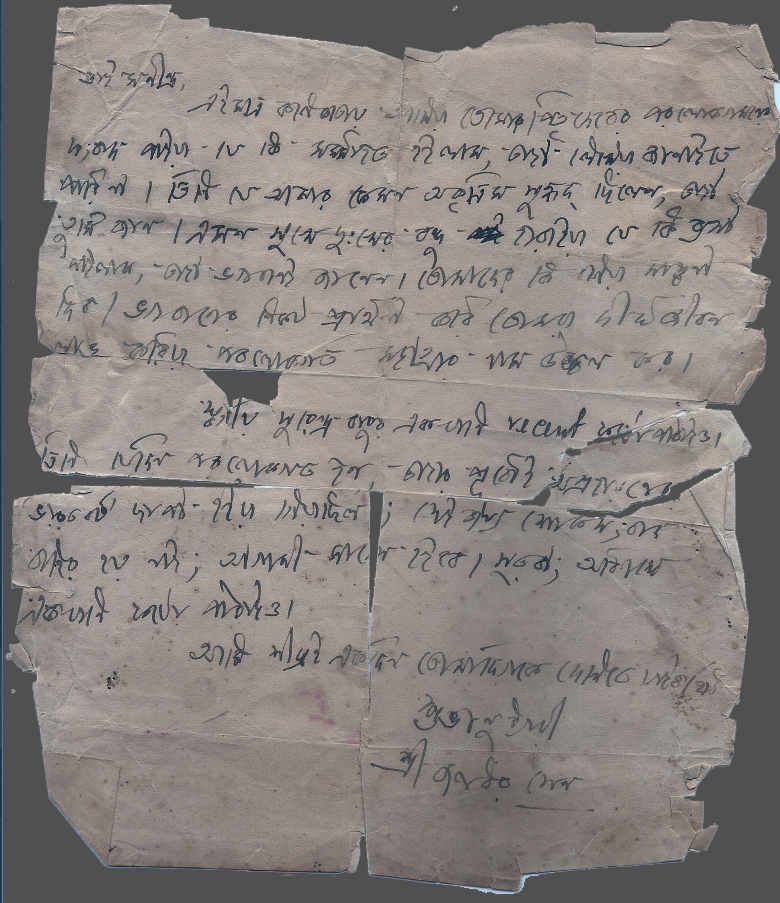
A letter of condolence from Jaladhar Sen to Manindranath Roy-1929

When Surendranath Roy died, Jaladhar Sen, editor of Bharatbarsha, wrote to Manindranath, son of Surendranath, a letter of condolence.

== Awards and recognition ==
- Jaladhar Sen was awarded the title of রায় বাহাদুর (Ray Bahadur) by the British government in 1929 for his contribution to Bengali literature and social reform. However, he never suppressed his inclination and support for the Indian patriotic movement.
- He was elected twice as the vice president of the Bangiya Sahitya Parishad.
- In 1932 Jaladhar Sen was facilitated in a function held in Rammohan Library, presided over by Sarat Chandra Chattopadhyay

== Bibliography ==
- Sen, Jaladhar (1915). (Kabya-Granthabali) vols 1–3.
- Sen, Jaladhar (1916). হিমালয় (Himalaya) (Bengali), Gurudas Chattopadhyay & Sons, Calcutta.
- Sen, Jaladhar (1920). ষোল আনি (Sholo Aani), Gurudas Chattopadhyay & Sons, Calcutta.
- Sen Jaladhar (1920). আত্মজীবনী ও স্মৃতি-তর্পন (Atmo Jibani O Smriti Tarpan), Jiggasa Agencies Ltd. Calcutta 9.
