= Kumarkhali M.N. Pilot Secondary School =

Secondary School in Kumarkhali, Kushtia

Kumarkhali M.N. Secondary School
- কুমারখালী এম.এন. পাইলট মাধ্যমিক বিদ্যালয়
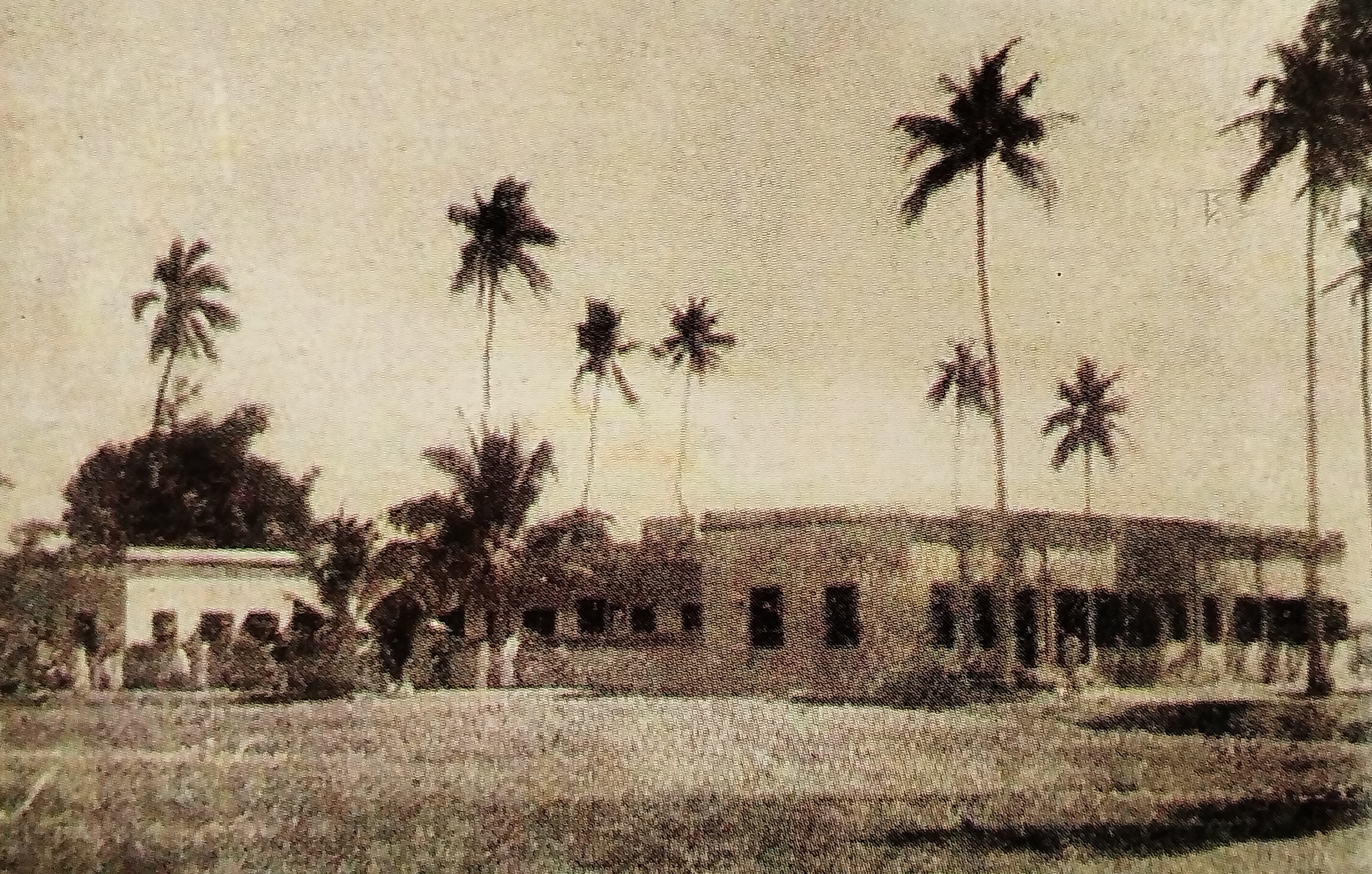
- The school was established in this building, which was washed away by the Gorai river

Location
- Puraton College Road, Elangi; Kumarkhali; Bangladesh
- Coordinates: 23.8598°N 89.2278°E

Information
- Other name: Kumarakhali Mathuranath Secondary School
- Former name: Kumarkhali M.N. High School
- School type: MPO Secondary School
- Established: 1856; 170 years ago
- Founder: Shri Yukta Babu Mathuranath Kundu
- School board: Board of Intermediate and Secondary Education, Jashore
- School code: 117655 (EIIN)
- President: Zakaria Khan James
- Headmaster: Firoz Mohammad Basar
- Classes: 6th-10th
- Language: Bengali
- Campus type: City
- Website: kumarkhalimnsecondaryschool.jessoreboard.gov.bd

Kumarkhali M.N. Pilot Secondary School (Bengali: কুমারখালী এম.এন. পাইলট মাধ্যমিক বিদ্যালয়) is an old secondary school located in Kumarkhali of Kushtia District. The school was established in 1856. In terms of antiquity, the school is notable not only in Kushtia district but also in the entire Nadia district.

== History ==
There was an abandoned Nilkuthi in the present Kumarkhali Municipal area. In 1856, Sri Yukta Babu Mathuranath Kundu established an English school in the abandoned Neelkuthi to promote English education. Then the school came to be known as Kumarakhali Mathuranath High School after the founder.

The building in which the school was established in Neelkuthi got lost in the course of time in the Gorai River.

== Educational activities ==
The school is under the Jessore Board at secondary level. There are 03 sections in 9th-10th class, they are-

1. Department of Science
2. Department of Humanities
3. Department of Commerce

== Notable students ==
- Jaladhar Sen

== Bibliography ==
- Md. Rezaul Karim (December 2022). কুষ্টিয়ার প্রত্ননিদর্শন [Archeology of Kushtia] (in Bengali). Dhaka: Gatidhara. p. 192. ISBN 978-984-8950-41-8.
