= Kushtia Central Cemetery =

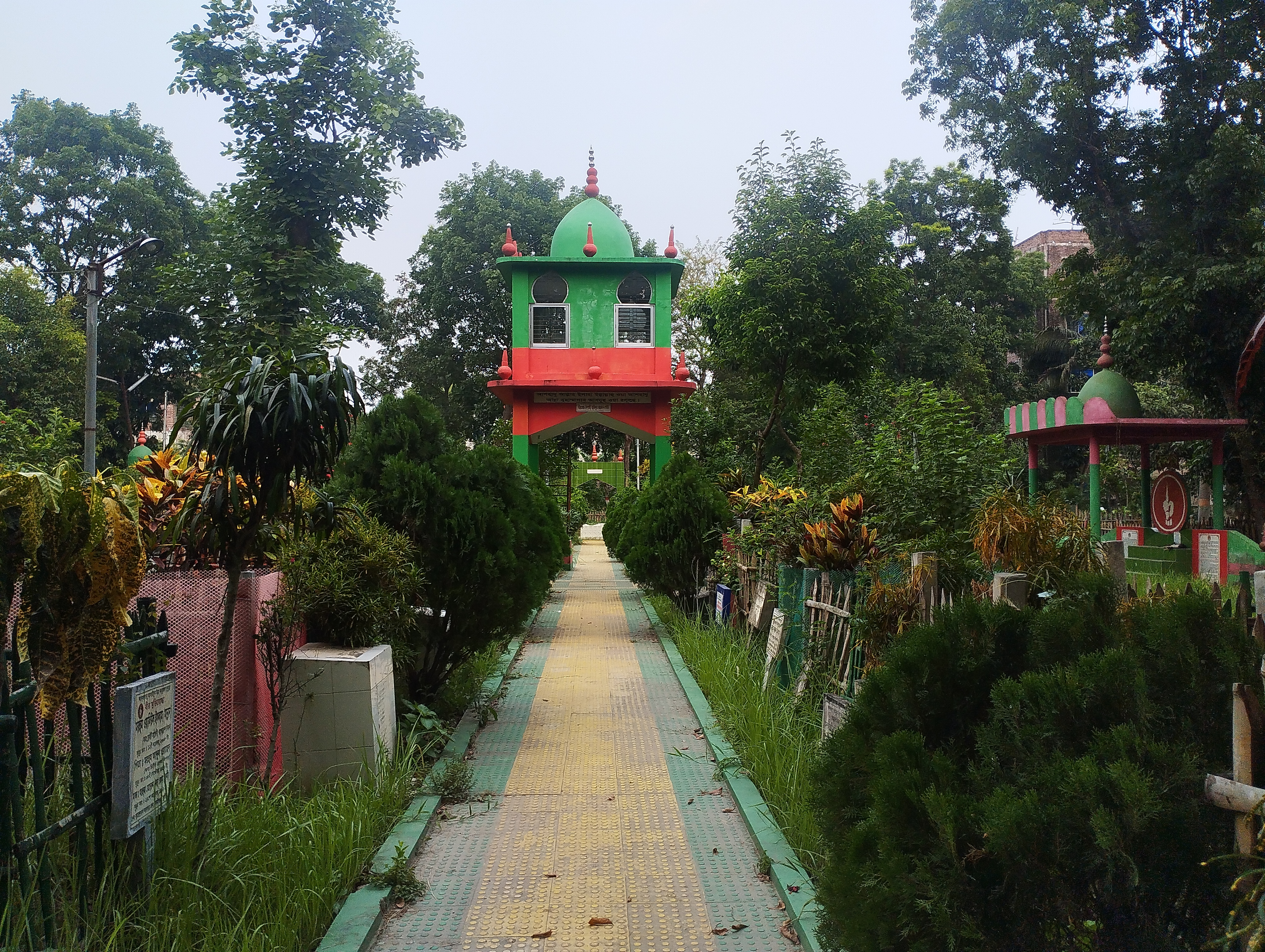

- Location within Bangladesh

Details
- Established: 1935; 91 years ago
- Location: Kushtia
- Country: Bangladesh
- Coordinates: 23.899725°N 89.126342°E
- Type: Muslim cemetery
- Owned by: Kushtia Municipality
- Size: c. 3.5 acres (14,000 m^{2})
- No. of graves: Abu Zafar; Khandaker Rashiduzzaman Dudu

Kushtia Central Cemetery (Bengali: কুষ্টিয়া কেন্দ্রীয় পৌর গোরস্থান) is a cemetery located in Kushtia, South Bengal. The cemetery was established in 1935 during the British colonial period.

== History ==
The cemetery was established in 1935 in Kushtia. The site of the cemetery was previously known as Dakater Bhita (bandits' ground). Among its founders was a man named Keramat Ali Mastan who was known for his religious devotion. The first gravedigger of the cemetery was a non-Bengali individual. In 1951 Keramat Ali and another man named Anwar Hossain built a mosque next to the cemetery. It is now known as the Kushtia Central Cemetery Jame .asjidhe western side of the cemetery, there is a designated area for funeral prayers, known as the Municipal Janaza Ground. The graveyard is currently operated under the authority of the Kushtia Municipality.

== External ==
- Media related to Kushtia Central Cemetery at Wikimedia Commons
