= Gram Barta Prokashika =

Newspaper in British India

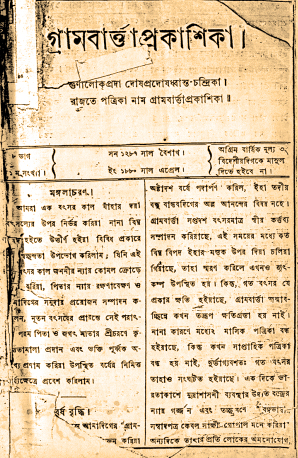
- Gram Barta Prakashika cover from April, 1880
- Type: Weekly newspaper
- Publisher: Kangal Harinath Majumder
- Founded: April 1863; 162 years ago
- Language: Bengali
- Headquarters: Kumarkhali, Kushtia, Bengal Presidency, British India

Gram Barta Prokashika (Bengali: গ্রাম বার্তা প্রকাশিকা) is a Bengali weekly newspaper published by Kangal Harinath Majumder in April 1863. Initially, it was printed at Girish Vidyaratna Press in Kolkata. The publication was shifted to Mathuranath Press at Kumarkhali, Kushtia in 1864.

== History ==
Majumder was an employee of a British-owned indigo production factory. He left the job and moved to Kumarkhali, a small town in Kushtia District in present-day Bangladesh. He started teaching students and decided to publish his own newspaper. In June–July 1864, the newspaper became a fortnightly and a weekly in April–May 1871. In 1873, the Kumarkhali press was donated to Majumder by its owner, Mathuranath Maitreya. Maitreya was the father of historian Akshay Kumar Maitreya.

The writer Mir Mosharraf Hossain wrote part of his classic novel Bishad Shindhu inside the press building. The novel and Lalon's songs were first published here.

Government of Bangladesh allocated a budget of Tk 6 crore to build a museum to preserve the press.
