= Universal Medical College and Hospital, Dhaka =

Medical institution in Dhaka

Universal Medical College Hospital
- ইউনিভার্সেল মেডিকেল কলেজ হাসপাতাল
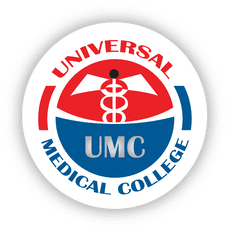
- Emblem of Universal Medical College
- Other name: UMCH
- Former name: Aysha Memorial Specialized Hospital
- Motto: "Smile for all"
- Type: Private Medical College & Hospital
- Established: 1996 (Hospital); 2013 (Medical College)
- Academic affiliations: University of Dhaka
- Chairman: Mrs. Priti Chakraborty
- Principal: Uttam Kumar Paul
- Director of Hospital: Ashis Kumar Chakraborty
- Academic staff: 78
- Undergraduates: 421 (Local 340, Foreign 81)
- Location: 74G/75, Pea-cock Square, Mohakhali, Dhaka 1215, Bangladesh; 23.7761°N 90.3957°E
- Campus: Urban
- Language: English, Bengali
- Hospital beds: 250
- Website: umchltd.com; umc-bd.com

Universal Medical College and Hospital (ইউনিভার্সেল মেডিকেল কলেজ ও হাসপাতাল) is a private medical college and hospital located in Mohakhali, Dhaka, the capital of Bangladesh. Established in 1996, it offers a five-year undergraduate MBBS program followed by a compulsory one-year internship. It is academically affiliated with the University of Dhaka and recognized by the Bangladesh Medical and Dental Council.

== History ==
Universal Medical College and Hospital was established in 1996 as Aysha Memorial Specialized Hospital, a private healthcare facility located in Mohakhali, Dhaka. In 2004, the hospital underwent administrative changes, and in 2013, it was renamed Universal Medical College and Hospital following the establishment of its affiliated medical college to provide medical education, clinical training, and healthcare services.

== Awards and community engagement ==
During the COVID-19 pandemic, the institution received ‘Covid Hero’ award. It offered free treatment to members of the Bangladesh Lawyers Association (BLA). It was also reported to have treated National Professor Dr. Anisuzzaman and folk singer Farida Parveen. The college organizes an annual Gorbini Ma award ceremony to acknowledge the contributions of mothers of individuals recognized for achievements in various fields. In 2018, the awards were presented to the mothers of singer Kumar Bishwajit, actor Ferdous Ahmed, and singer Kanak Chapa. In 2023, the ceremony recognized the mother of actress Mehazabien Chowdhury. UMCH has also organized free medical camps and public health seminars.

== Research and collaboration ==
Since 2023, Universal Medical College and Hospital has been involved in both national and international research and educational collaborations related to research and education. In February 2023, it hosted an Erasmus+ DigiCare workshop with Tampere University (Finland) and partners from Portugal and Vietnam on digital methods in medical and nursing education. In November 2024, the institution signed a memorandum of understanding (MoU) with the Bangladesh Institute of ICT in Development (BIID) Foundation to establish a Nutrition Club for activities related to nutrition, public health, and research. The hospital has also conducted seminars with clinical partners such as Malaysia's KL Fertility & Gynaecology Centre (June 2024) and entered agreements with other healthcare education and service providers, including Interhealth Hospital of Saudi Arabia.

== Campus and facilities ==
The campus is situated at 74G/75,Pea-Cock Square, Mohakhali, Dhaka 1215. The college includes lecture halls, laboratories, a library, and hostel accommodations. Clinical training takes place at the affiliated hospital. In January 2020, construction began on a new 500-bed facility at Universal Medical College and Hospital. The development was marked by a foundation stone laying ceremony.

== Academic programs ==
The college follows the National MBBS curriculum and admits both Bangladeshi and international students in accordance the guidelines of the Bangladesh Medical and Dental Council. In 2024, the 10th batch of MBBS students began their academic session. Private medical college tuition and admission fees are regulated by the government.

== Affiliation ==
The college is listed in the Directorate General of Health Services (Bangladesh)(DGHS) Facility Registry, which officially recognizes it as a medical institution in Bangladesh. The institution is recognized by the Bangladesh Medical and Dental Council and it is academically affiliated with the University of Dhaka.

== Administration ==
- Chairman: Mrs. Priti Chakraborty
- Managing Director: Ashis Kumar Chakraborty
- Principal: Uttam Kumar Paul

== See also ==
- List of medical colleges in Bangladesh
