= Abu Zafar (lyricist) =

Bangladeshi lyricist (1943–2024)

- আবু জাফর
- Born: 15 May 1943; Nadia district, Bengal Province, British India (present-day Kushtia District, Bangladesh)
- Died: 6 December 2024 (aged 81); Dhaka, Bangladesh
- Burial place: Kushtia Central Cemetery
- Spouses: Farida Parveen
- Children: 4

Abu Zafar (15 May 1943 – 6 December 2024) was a Bangladeshi lyricist, music composer, poet and singer. His notable songs include Ei Padma Ei Meghna, Tomra Bhulei Gecho Mallikadir Naam, Nindar Kata Jodi Na Bidhilo Gaye, Ami Helen Kingba Momtajke Dekhini, and Tumi Raat Ami Raatjaga Pakhi.

The song Ei Padma Ei Meghna ranked 17 among top 20 all time Bengali songs by the listeners of BBC Bangla in 2006.

== Early life ==
Abu Zafar was born on 15 May 1943 to Khondaker Md Jamir Uddin at Kanchanpur village, in Kumarkhali of Kushtia in the then British India.

== Career ==
Abu Zafar was a regular musician and lyricist for Bangladesh Radio in Dhaka and Rajshahi, and Bangladesh Television. He served as a professor of Bangla at Chuadanga Government College and Kushtia Government College until his retirement in 2000.

Abu Zafar wrote books which include Notun Raatri Purono Din (poetry), Bazare Durnam Tobu Tumi Sarbosso (poetry), Biplobotter Soviet Kobita (translated poetry), and Tumi Raat Ami Raatjaga Pakhi.

== Personal life and death ==
Abu Zafar married Farida Parveen, a folk singer, in 1976. The couple had collaborated on numerous songs together until they were estranged by 2004. Zafar had three sons and a daughter, Jihan Faria.

Abu Zafar died in Dhaka on 6 December 2024, at the age of 81.
