= Krishna Chattopadhyay =

Indian singer

Krishna Chattopadhyay (1 October 1935 – 23 May 2009) was an Indian singer, who along with her contemporary Manju Gupta, was the leading exponent of the songs composed by Atulprasad Sen, Dwijendralal Ray and Rajanikanta Sen. She also sang compositions by Himangshu Dutta.

== Biography ==
Chattopadhyay was born in Krishnanagar, Bengal Presidency, (now West Bengal), India on 1 October 1935, the daughter of Harendranath Chattopadhyay, who was also a well-known singer. She was tutored in music by her father and mentored by the renowned singer Dilipkumar Roy, son of Dwijendralal Ray. She lived in Calcutta for most of her life, becoming a very successful professional singer, known for her distinctive style. She gave music recitals in Calcutta and other Indian cities over many decades, performed in radio and television programs and recorded numerous albums. She died in 2009.
