= Farida Parveen =

Bangladeshi folk singer (1954–2025)

Farida Parveen ফরিদা পারভীন
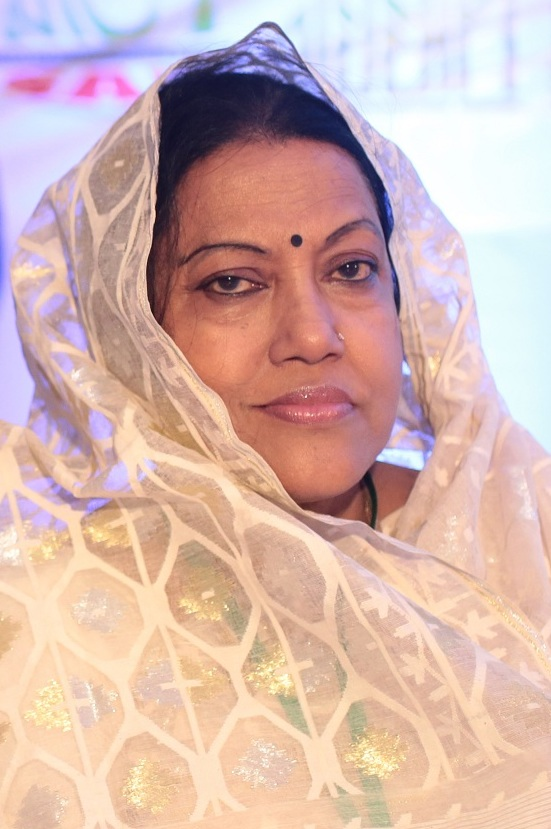
- Parveen in 2017

Background information
- Born: 31 December 1954
- Origin: Natore District, East Bengal, Dominion of Pakistan (now Natore, Bangladesh)
- Died: 13 September 2025 (aged 70) Dhaka, Bangladesh
- Genres: Lalon, folk
- Occupation: Singer
- Instruments: Instrumental, vocal
- Years active: 1968–2025

Farida Parveen (31 December 1954 – 13 September 2025) was a Bangladeshi folk singer. Referred to as "the Queen of Lalon song," she received Ekushey Padak in 1987 and Bangladesh National Film Award for Best Female Playback Singer for the film Andho Prem (1993).

== Early life ==
Parveen was born on 31 December 1954 in Natore, and was brought up in Kushtia. Her father worked in the health service. As a child she used to play a harmonium. In 1968, she was enlisted with Rajshahi Betar as a Nazrul singer. She graduated from Kushtia Government College under Rajshahi University.

Parveen first took lesson from Komal Chakrabarti. Later on, she received lessons in classical music from Ustaad Ibrahim Khan, Ustad Rabindranath Ray, Ustad Osman Goni and Ustad Motaleb Biswas. She then learnt Nazrul songs from Ustad Mir Muzaffar Ali and Ustad Abdul Qadir. She was introduced to Lalon music by Moksed Ali Shai.

== Career ==
Parveen started her career with Nazrul Sangeet. In 1973, she performed the patriotic song Ei Padma Ei Meghna and the Lalon song Shatyo Bol Shupothey Chol. Her other songs are Tomra Bhulei Gechho Mallikadir Naam, Nindar Kanta Jodi and several Lalon classics. She sings mostly Lalon songs. In 2014, she performed in a sufi festival organized by Bangladesh embassy and the Centre for Fine Arts in Belgium. In 2015, she performed in New Delhi at a program organized by Bangladesh High commission on Pohela Boishakh.

== Personal life and death ==
Parveen was married to lyricist and composer Abu Zafar (1943–2024). The couple split in 2004 and later she married Gazi Md Abdul Hakim a renowned Flute-artist and were married until her death.

For a long time, Parvin suffered from kidney complications. On 2 September 2025, as part of her regular dialysis at Universal Medical College Hospital in Mohakhali, she underwent dialysis, after which her physical condition took a turn for the worse, and she was admitted to the ICU for treatment. Subsequently, when her physical condition deteriorated further, the doctors decided to put her on a ventilator on 10 September. She died three days later, on 13 September, at the age of 70.

== Works ==
=== Songs ===
- "Ei Padma Ei Meghna"
- "Barir Kache Arshi Nogor"
- "Shatyo Bol Shupothey Chol"
- "Tomra Bhulei Gechho Mallikader Naam"
- "Nindar Kata Jodi"
- "Porga Namaz Jene Shune"

=== Albums ===
- Khachar Vitor Ochin Pakhi
- Kishoree Bou
- Milon Hobe Koto Dine
- Nindar Kata
- Pap Punner Kotha
- Shomoi Gele Shodhan Hobena
- Tomra Vule Gacho

== Awards ==
- Feroza Begum Memorial Gold Medal (2019)
- Fukuoka Asian Culture Prize (2008)
- Bangladesh National Film Award for Best Female Playback Singer (1993)
- Ekushey Padak (1987)
- Anannya Top Ten Awards (2008)
