= Rajanikanta Sen =

Bengali poet and composer (1865–1910)

- রজনীকান্ত সেন
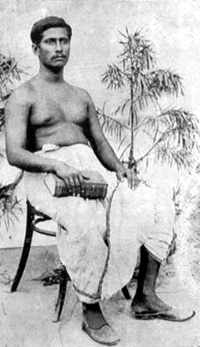
- Portrait of Sen
- Pronunciation: [ˈrɔd͡ʒonikant̪o ˈʃen]
- Born: 26 July 1865; Belkuchi, Pabna, Bengal Presidency, British Raj (now Sirajganj, Bangladesh)
- Died: 13 September 1910 (aged 45); Calcutta, Bengal Presidency, British Raj (now Kolkata, West Bengal, India)
- Occupations: Lawyer; lyricist; composer; singer
- Notable work: Kantageeti, Bani, Kalyani, Amrita
- Movement: Bengal Renaissance

Rajanikanta Sen (Note: Bengali: [ˈrɔd͡ʒonikant̪o ˈʃen].) (Bengali: রজনীকান্ত সেন, pronounced [ˈrɔd͡ʒonikant̪o ˈʃen]; 26 July 1865 – 13 September 1910), also known as Kantakobi, (Note: Bengali pronunciation: [ˈkant̪okobi].) was a Bengali poet and composer, known for his devotional (bhakti) compositions, as well as his patriotic songs.

== Early life, education and profession ==
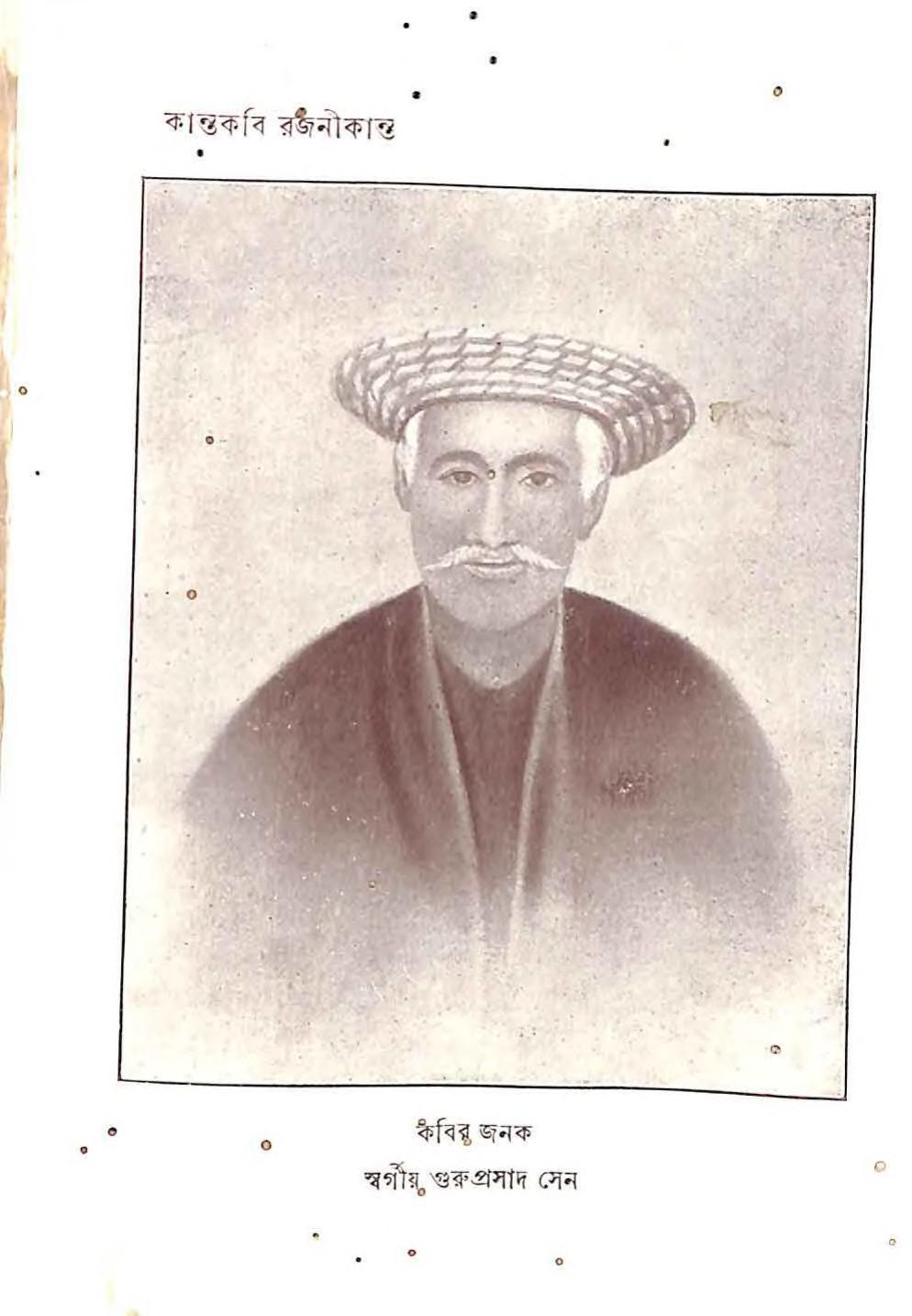
Sri Guruprasad Sen, father of Rajanikanta Sen

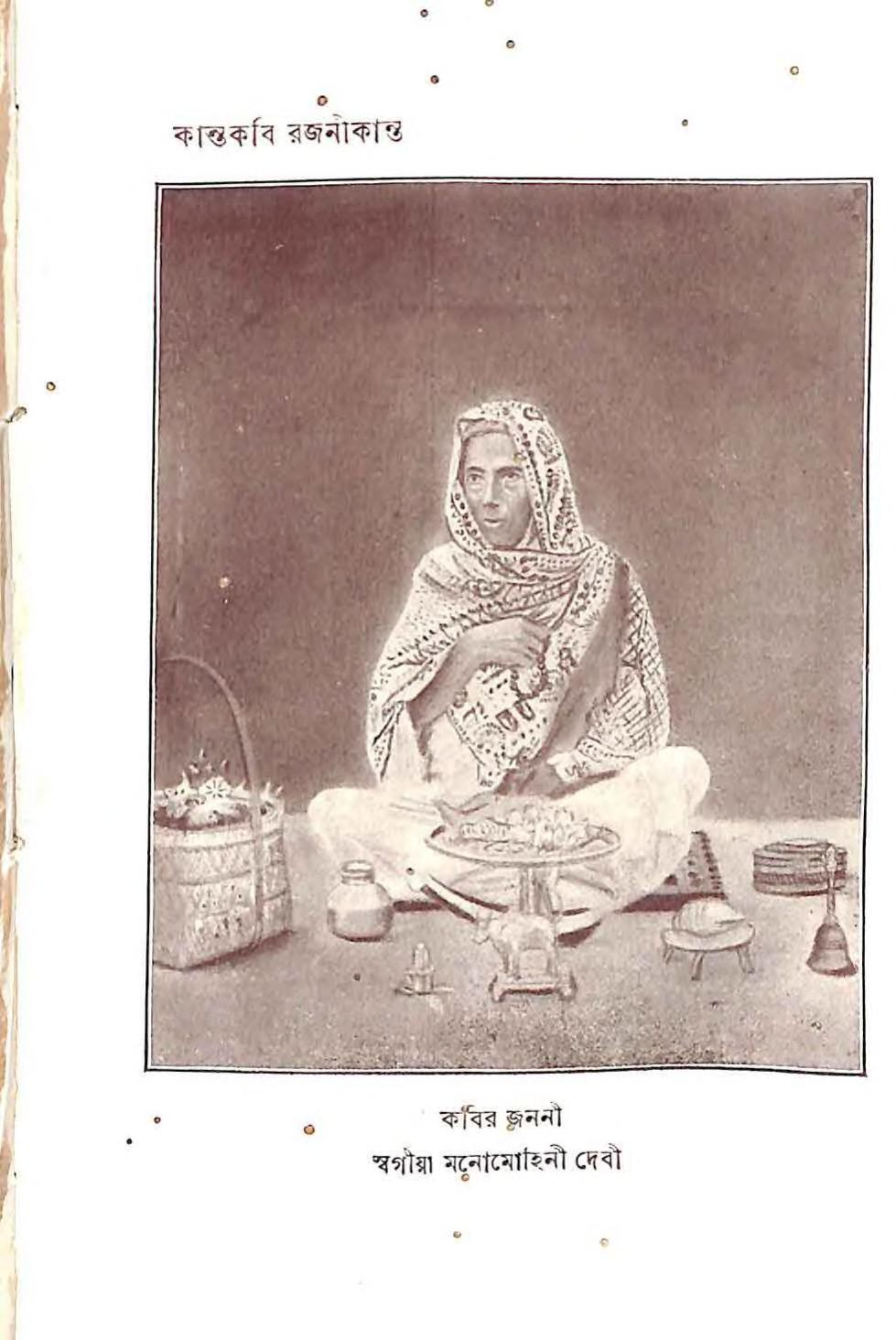
Monomohini Debi, mother of Rajanikanta Sen

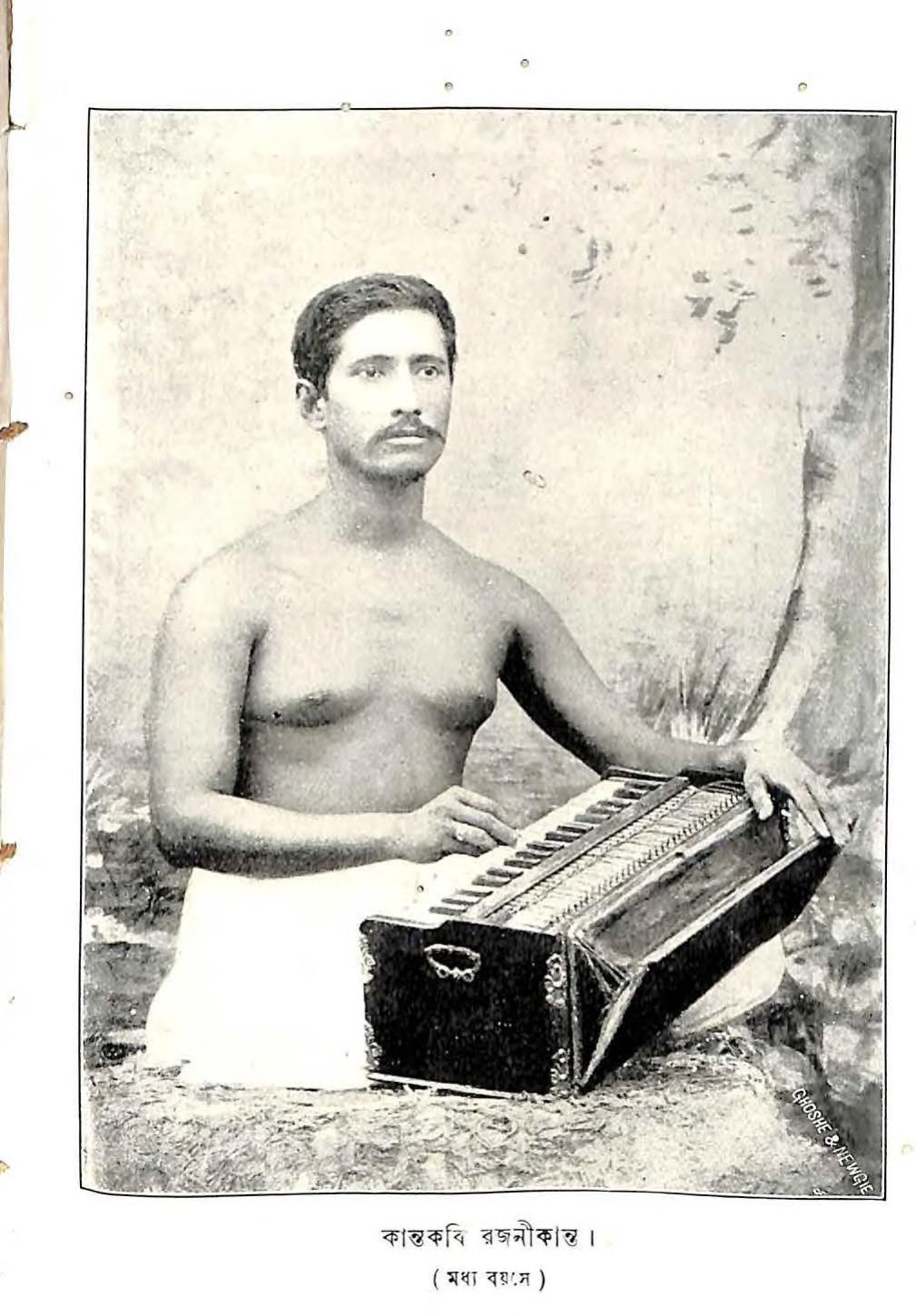
Poet Rajanikanta Sen

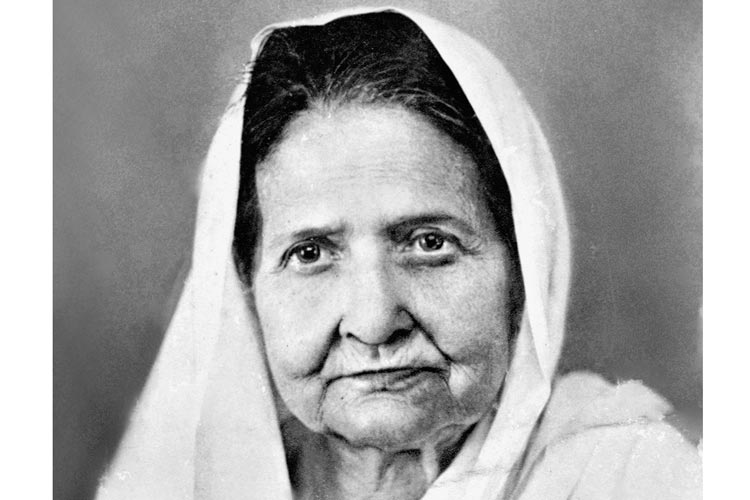
Hiranmoyee Debi, wife of Rajanikanta Sen

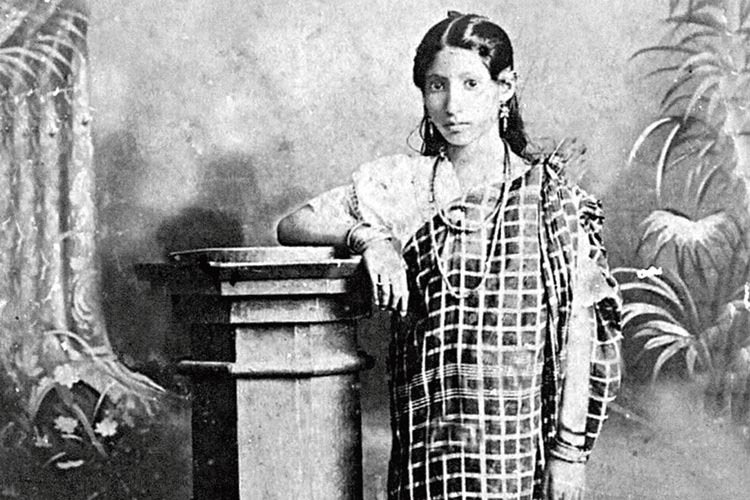
Shantilata Roy, daughter of Rajanikanta Sen

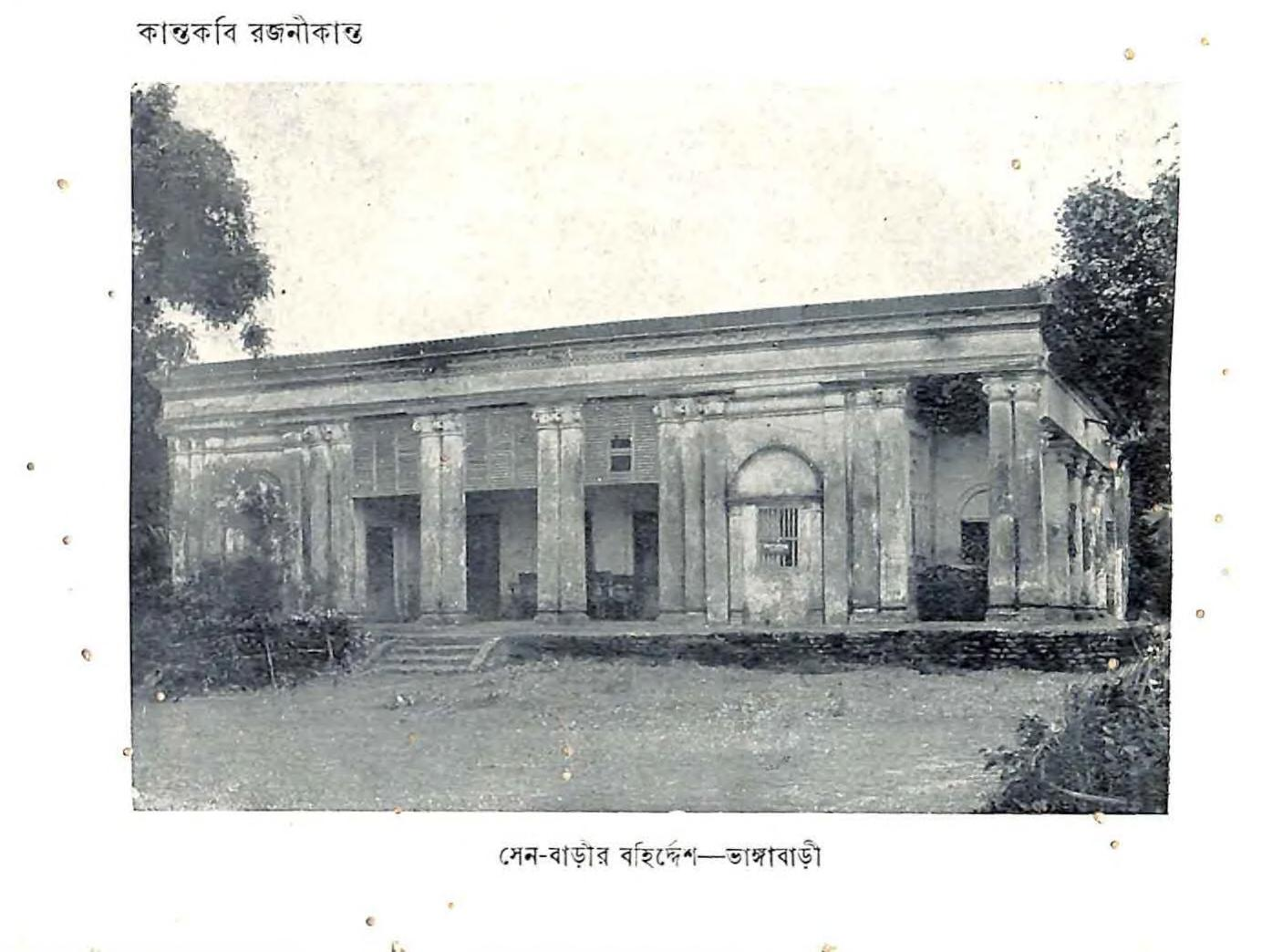
House of poet Rajanikanta Sen, 1909, Rajshahi

Rajanikanta was born in a Vaidya family in the Bhanga Bari village, Belkuchi, Sirajganj, Bangladesh (then greater Pabna District, Bengal Province, British India). He was the third child of Guruprasad Sen and Manomohini Debi. Rajanikanta's sister Ambuja Sundari Dasgupta was a renowned poet too. Originally, his ancestors hailed from Sahadevpur village under Tangail Subdivision of Mymensingh District on right side of Brahmaputra in Bangladesh. When Rajanikanta's great grand father Jogiram died, his pregnant wife Karunamoyee came to his Brother's residence at Bhangabari village and gave birth to Golaknath, grand father of Rajanikanta. Though Golaknath was deprived of higher education due to financial constraints, he imparted best of education to his two sons, Govindanath and Guruprasad. Govindanath practiced law in the court of Rajshahi in Bangladesh. Guruprasad, father of Rajanikanta, passed LLB from Dacca university and became a sub-judge. He served as sub-judge in many parts of Bengal, such as Rangpur, Dinajpur, Bhagalpur, Munger, Kalna, and Katwa, and finally came to Krishnanagar and retired.Guruprasad was posted in Katwa when Rajanikanta was born.

Rajanikanta started his schooling at Boalia Zilla School (now Rajshahi Collegiate School). He learned Sanskrit from Rajnath Tarkaratna, a neighbour in his village Bhangakuthi during school vacations. He got Gopal Chandra Lahiri as his academic mentor. In 1882 he passed Entrance Examination from Coochbihar Jenkins School. Other claims such as he was from Koochbihar are of no substance. Then he came to Calcutta and passed FA in 1885 with second division. He completed BA degree in 1889 and BL degree in 1891 from Kolkata City College. He too then started practicing law in Rajshahi where Govindanath was practicing. Rajanikanta earned reputation quickly. However, his passion lay in cultural activities like music, literature, acting in plays etc. In this endeavor he received support from his friends such as historian Akshay Kumar Maitreya, and also from his wife. He worked as a Munsif for some days in Natore and Naogaon.

== Orientation towards Music ==
Rajanikanta's father Guruprasad was inclined to poetry and music, and was a composer of Vaishnab and Shiva-Durga songs (Padabali). Guruprasad collected age old Vaishnava lyrics in Brajabuli dialect from Katwa-Kalna area and compiled them into a book titled Padachintamanimala. His mother Manomohini Devi had interest in Bengali literature. She used to discuss it with young Rajanikanta. All these influenced his future compositions a lot. Sen got interested in music from Tarakeshwar Chakrabarty, his friend in Bhangabari. He was fluent in writing poems in Bengali and Sanskrit from childhood. He started composing music for his poems and singing those along with playing musical instruments later. Rajanikanta's poems were published in various local magazines such as Utsaha, Ashalata etc. He used to compose songs for inaugural and closing ceremonies for various assemblies in his college days even in very short notice.

One such song is stated below, which Rajanikanta composed within a very short period of one hour for such an assembly in Rajshahi library:

তব, চরণ নিম্নে, উৎসবময়ী শ্যাম-ধরনী সরসা;
উর্দ্ধে চাহ অগণিত-মনি-রঞ্জিত নভো-নীলাঞ্চলা
সৌম্য-মধুর-দিব্যাঙ্গনা শান্ত-কুশল-দরশা ৷

Beneath your feet lies the prosperous and bountiful earth
Behold the blue sky engraved with countless gems above
She is like a sweet and graceful angel

== Personal life ==
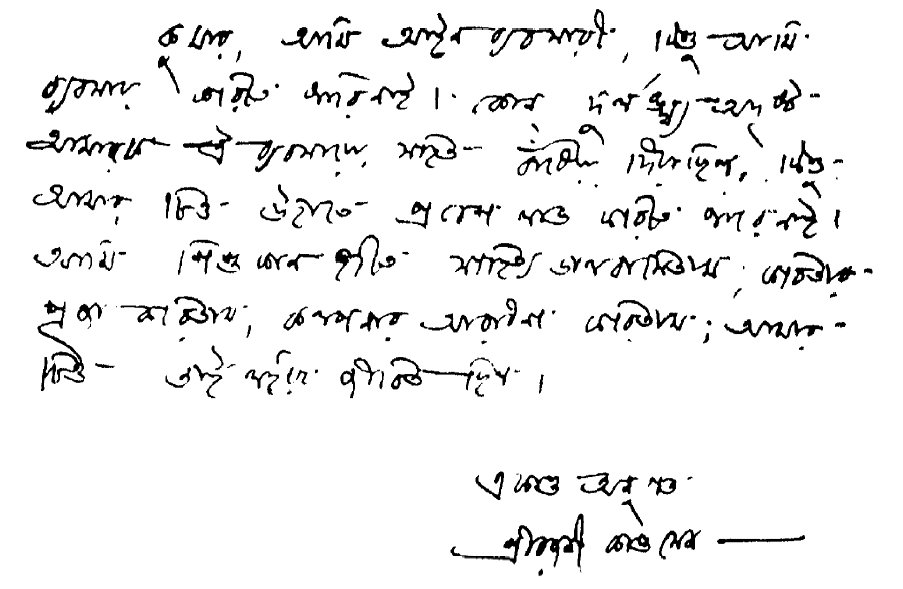
Rajanikanta's Letter To Sharat Kumar Ray describing his interest in music

After the voluntary retirement of his father the family of Rajanikanta became financially dependent on Guruprasad's elder brother's sons Barada Gobinda and Kali Kumar. Both of them died suddenly in quick succession in 1878. Rajani's younger brother Janakikanta had also just died of hydrophobia. Suddenly the prosperous family plunged into a financial crisis. Rajanikanta had to study and practice law to support the family. However, he expressed his dislikes towards the profession in a letter written to Sri Sarat Kumar Ray. He married Hiranmayee Devi in 1883, who used to discuss with and encouraged Rajanikanta regarding his poetry and sometimes suggested themes for the poems. They had four sons – Shachindra, Gnanendra, Bhupendra, Kshitindra; and two daughters - Shatadalbasini and Shantibala. Bhupendra died at a young age. Rajani's firm belief in God is reflected in the following song composed on the next day:

তোমারি দেওয়া প্রাণে তোমারি দেওয়া দুখ,
তোমারি দেওয়া বুকে, তোমারি অনুভব ৷
তোমারি দুনয়নে তোমারি শোক-বারি,
তোমারি ব্যাকুলতা তোমারি হা হা রব ৷

You (God) gifted life but filled it with sorrow
You filled our hearts with faith in you
You gave us eyes and filled them with tears
You make me perplexed so I cry helplessly

== Contribution to Bengali music and literature ==
Rajanikanta's songs may be classified into four categories: Devotional (ভক্তি মূলক), Patriotic (দেশাত্মবোধক), Humanitarian (মানবধর্মী) and Satire (হাস্যরসাত্মক).

There was an assembly in Calcutta town hall on 7 August 1905 for protesting against Partition of Bengal. The boycott of British goods and using Swadeshi (Indian) items were decided by eminent Bengali leaders. Indian common men started using clothes manufactured in India. However, those were not so fine as compared to British ones. This made some of the Indians unhappy. In this context Rajanikanta wrote his famous song:

মায়ের দেওয়া মোটা কাপড় মাথায় তুলে নেরে ভাই;
দীন দুখিনি মা যে তোদের তার বেশি আর সাধ্য নাই ৷

My brothers, please accept the coarse clothing offered by your mother
As this is all your poor mother(nation) can afford

The song became popular across entire Bengal and so was Sen. The song was a major source of inspiration for the participants of the contemporary Swadeshi movement as well as for the Indian freedom fighters in the years to come. He wrote another popular song with similar intention:

আমরা নেহাত গরীব, আমরা নেহাত ছোট,-
তবু আছি সাতকোটি ভাই,-জেগে ওঠ !

We are extremely poor, we are extremely small
Yet we are seventy million brothers, rise up

Three books written by Rajanikanta were published in his life time; they were Bani (বাণী) (1902), Kalyani (কল্যাণী) (1905) and Amrita (অমৃত) (1910). Durgadas Lahiri in his encyclopedia of Bengali songs (বাঙালির গান), published in 1905, mentioned about Rajanikanta Sen:

"ইনি রাজশাহীতে ওকালতি করেন৷ বয়ঃক্রম প্রায় ৩২ বৎসর৷ বাণী এবং কল্যাণী নামক দুইখানি সঙ্গীত গ্রন্থ প্রণয়ন করিয়া ইনি যশস্বী হইয়াছেন৷ হাসির গান রচনায় ইনি সুনিপুন৷"

After his demise five compilations of his creations were published, they were Avoya (অভয়া) (1910), Anandamayi (আনন্দময়ী) (1910), Bishram (বিশ্রাম) (1910), Sadbhabkusum (সদ্ভাবকুসুম) (1913) and Shesdan ( শেষদান) (1916). Vani and Kalyani are collections of his songs. Amrita contains short poems to inculcate the right values in children. Rabindranath Tagore's Kanika influenced him to compose these poems. He started composing satirical songs being influenced by poet Dwijendralal Ray, who was befreiended with him during Ray's visit to Rajshahi.

Sen's major contribution towards Bengali literature and music was the immortal devotional songs which were written and composed by him. His songs were set to Hindustani classical style, mixing Kirtan, Baul and Tappa. He became well known as Kantakabi and his songs are often called Kantageeti.

=== Rajanikanta's's songs in Bengali films ===
Rajanikanta filmography
Year	Song	Artist	Director	Movie
1966	Tabo charana nimne utsobmoyee	Manna De	Pijush Basu	Subhas Chandra
1976	Keno bonchito habo charane	Arundhati Mukherjee	Tapan Singha	Harmoniam
1976	Tumi nirmala karo	Haimanti Shukla	Manu Sen	Mohan Baganer Meye
1999	Tumi nirmala karo	-	Prabhat Roy	Tumi Ele Tai
2000	Tumi nirmala karo		Ravi Kinagi	Josh

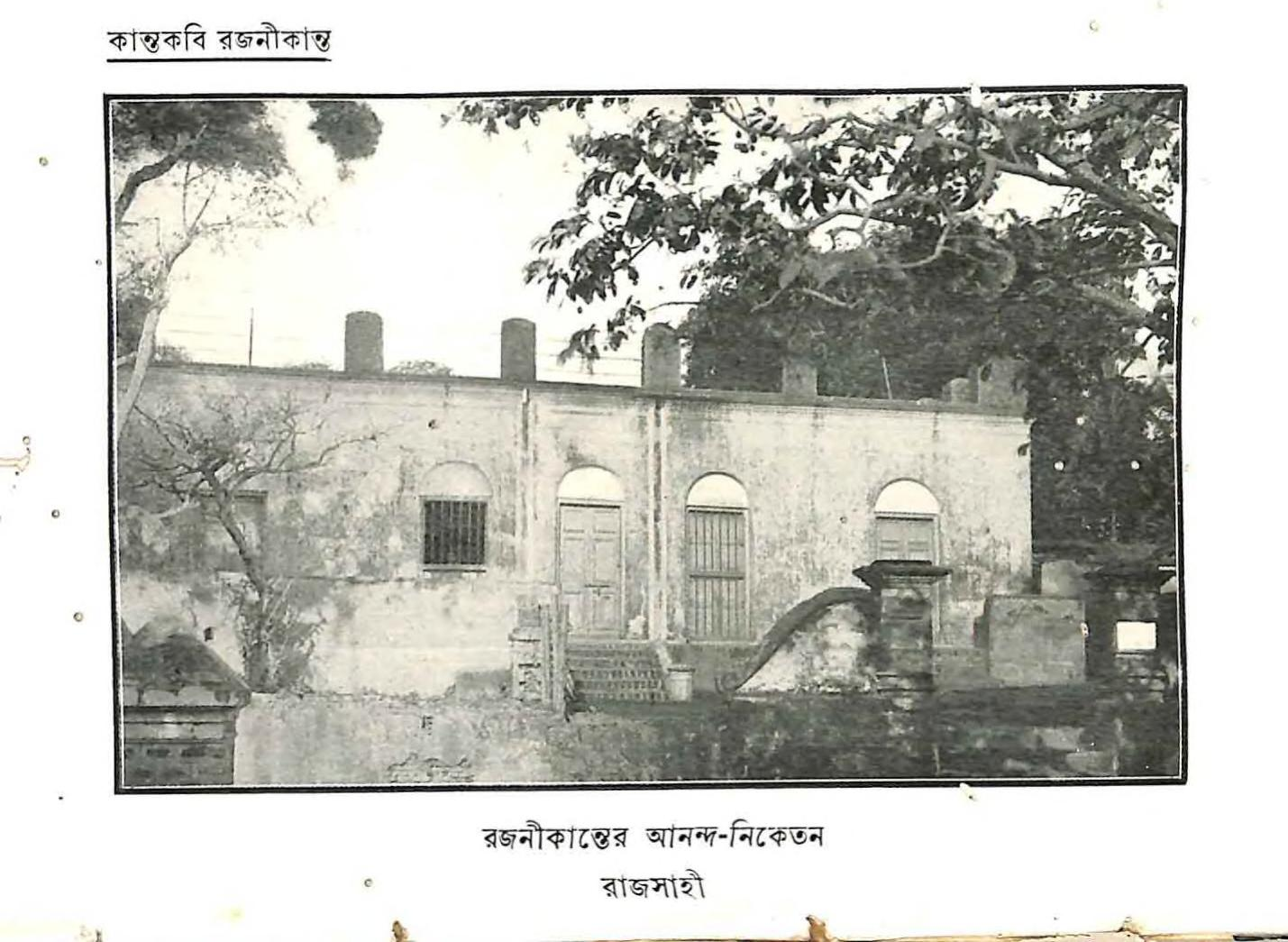
Ananda niketan of Kabi Rajanikanta Sen

== Contribution to Indian freedom movement ==
- Indian National Movement, the Swadeshi movement in particular, greatly influenced contemporary literature. Eminent poets including Rabindranath Tagore, Dwijendralal Roy, Debabrata Basu, Satyendranath Dutta, Atul Prasad Sen and Rajanikanta's contribution came through their patriotic poems and songs, and widely acknowledged with reverence.
- Rajanikanta was very close to Jaladhar Sen. One of such many incidences was cited by Jaladhar Sen himself:
  "তখন স্বদেশীর বড় ধূম। একদিন মধ্যাহ্নে একটার সময় আমি বসুমতী আফিসে বসিয়া আছি, এমন সময় রজনী (রজনীকান্ত সেন) ও রাজশাহীর খ্যাতনামা আমার পরম শ্রধ্যেয় স্বর্গীয় হরকুমার মহাশয়ের পুত্র অক্ষয়কুমার (Akshay Kumar Maitreya) আফিসে আসিয়া উপস্থিত। রজনী সেই দিনই দার্জিলিং মেলে বেলা এগারোটার সময় কলকাতায় পৌঁছিয়া অক্ষয়কুমারের মেসে উঠিয়াছিল। মেসের ছেলেরা তখন তাহাকে চাপিয়া ধরিয়াছে একটা গান বাঁধিয়া দিতে হইবে। গানের নামে রজনী পাগল হইয়া যাইত। তখনই গান লিখিতে বসিয়াছে। গানের মুখ ও একটি অন্তরা লিখিয়াই সে উঠিয়া দাঁড়াইয়াছে। সকলেই গানের জন্য উৎসুক; সে বলিল, ‘এই তো গান হইয়াছে, এ বার জলদা’র কাছে যাই। একদিকে গান কম্পোজ হউক, আর একদিকে লেখা হউক।’ আমি দেখে বললাম, আর কই? রজনী বলিল, ‘এইটুকু কম্পোজ কর, বাকিটুকু হইয়া যাইবে।’ সত্যি কম্পোজ আরম্ভ হইল আর অন্য দিকে গান লেখাও শেষ। আমি আর অক্ষয় সুর দিলাম। গান ছাপা হইল। এই গান ঘিরে ছেলেদের মধ্যে সেকি উন্মাদনা! স্বদেশ প্রেমে উদবুদ্ধ গানটি সর্বজনমনে স্পর্শ করিয়া গেল।"
  The song was "মায়ের দেওয়া মোটা কাপড় মাথায় তুলে নে রে ভাই" (Mayer deoa mota kapor mathay tule ne re bhai).

== Last days ==
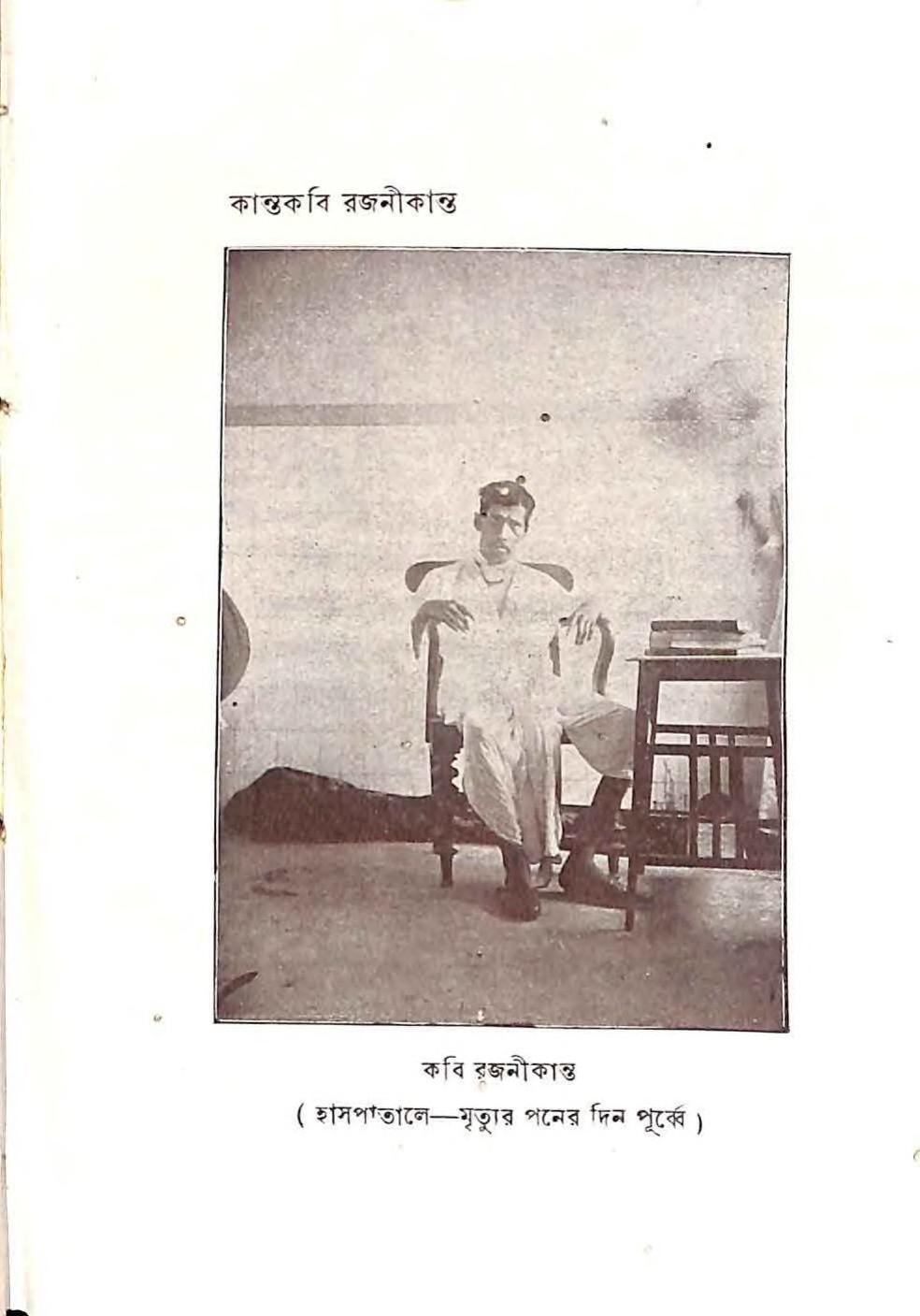
Rajanikanta Sen, on 30 August 1910 at Cottage No 12, Medical College

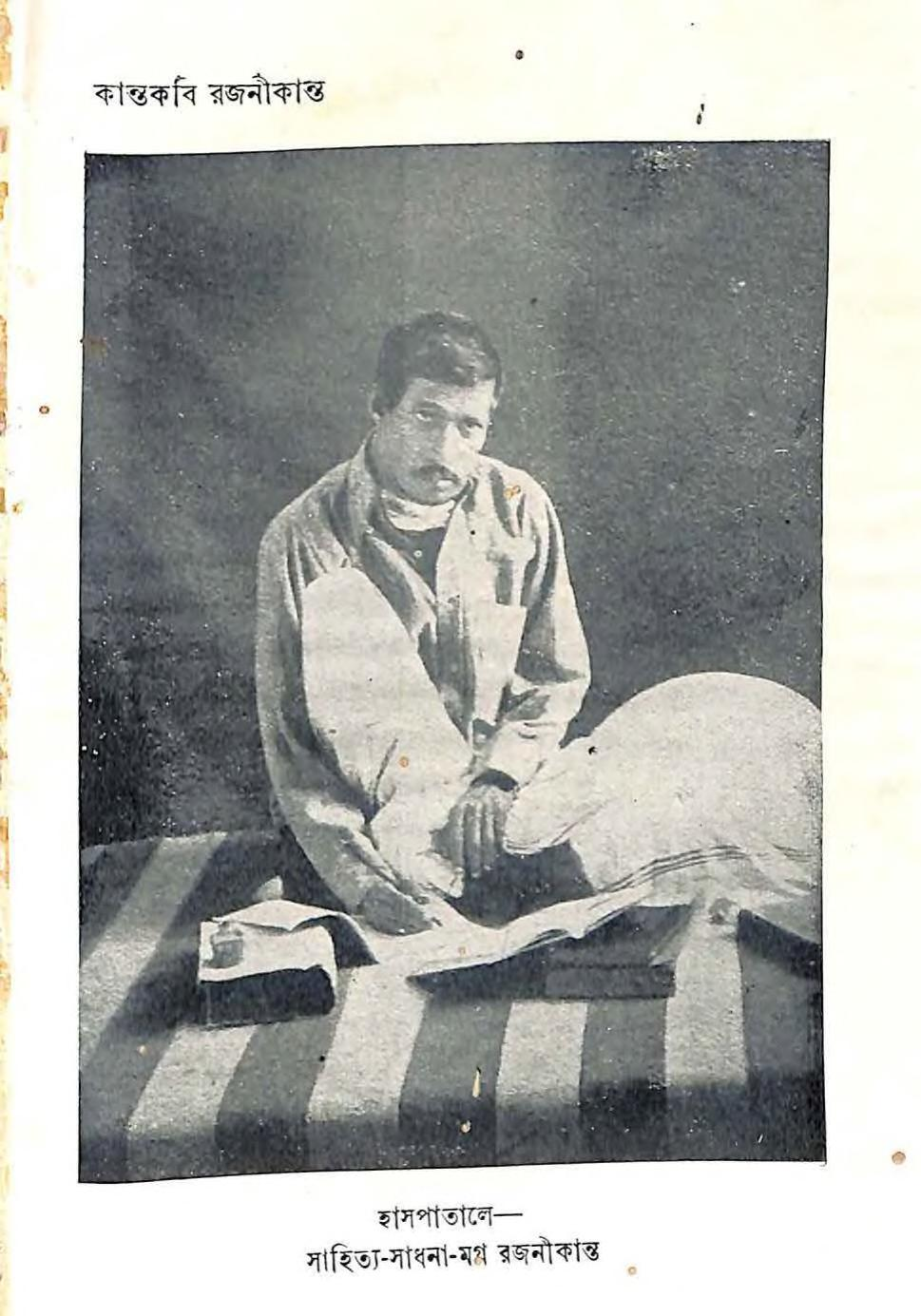
Rajanikanta Sen in Medical College

In 1909, Rajanikanta started suffering from throat problems. On 10 September, he was forced to move to Calcutta along with some family members. A British doctor examined him and diagnosed it as Larynx cancer. He consulted various doctors in Calcutta but his condition did not improve. As a last resort, he spent a couple of months in Varanasi with the hope of divine intervention. He had to sell off copyrights of his published books Vani and Kalyani to arrange for the trip. He had to return to Calcutta as his condition had worsened much. He underwent Tracheotomy operation by Captain Denham White on 10 February 1910 in Calcutta Medical College. He survived the operation but lost his voice forever. He spent the remaining days of his life in the cottage ward of the hospital (Cottage no. 12). It is noteworthy to mention that Hemendranath Bakshi and Bijitendra Nath Basu, students of 4th year, took personal initiative to attend and impart all medical assistance to the poet till his last breath. Dr. Mathura Mohan Bhattacharya, and Dr. Girish Chandra Maitra was in charge of his treatment. Rajanikanta used to write in his diary quite regularly during his stay in the hospital. He also started writing an autobiography which was written only up to the first chapter. Some poetry lovers and some of the students of the Calcutta Medical College tended after him, Maharaja Manindra Chandra Nandi and Sharat Kumar Ray, son of Pramathanath Ray, Zamindar of Dighapatiya, Natore, helped him financially. On 11 June 1910 Rabindranath Tagore visited the hospital to meet Sen. Sen's son Kshitindranath and daughter Shantibala sung a song composed by him and he accompanied by playing harmonium. This is reflected in the following song composed on the day Rabindranath met him:

আমায় সকল রকমে কাঙ্গাল করেছে, গর্ব করিতে চূর,
তাই যশ ও অর্থ, মান ও স্বাস্থ্য, সকলি করেছে দূর ৷
ঐ গুলো সব মায়াময় রূপে, ফেলেছিল মোরে অহমিকা-কূপে,
তাই সব বাধা সরায়ে দয়াল করেছে দীন আতুর;

I am impoverished by all means, my pride shattered,
I am devoid of fame, riches and my complete well being.
I was disillusioned and had descended into the dungeon of pride;
His kindness has lifted the obstacles and humbled me.

As gratitude towards Tagore's for visit in the hospital, Rajanikanta wrote a letter and another poem, "এই মুক্ত প্রাণের দৃপ্ত বাসনা তৃপ্ত করিবে কে ", and sent to Bolpur. Tagore wrote a letter to him on 30 July. In this, he appreciated Sen for his literary talent. During this period, he also composed a few Agamani-Vijaya songs. He died on 13 September 1910 in Kolkata.

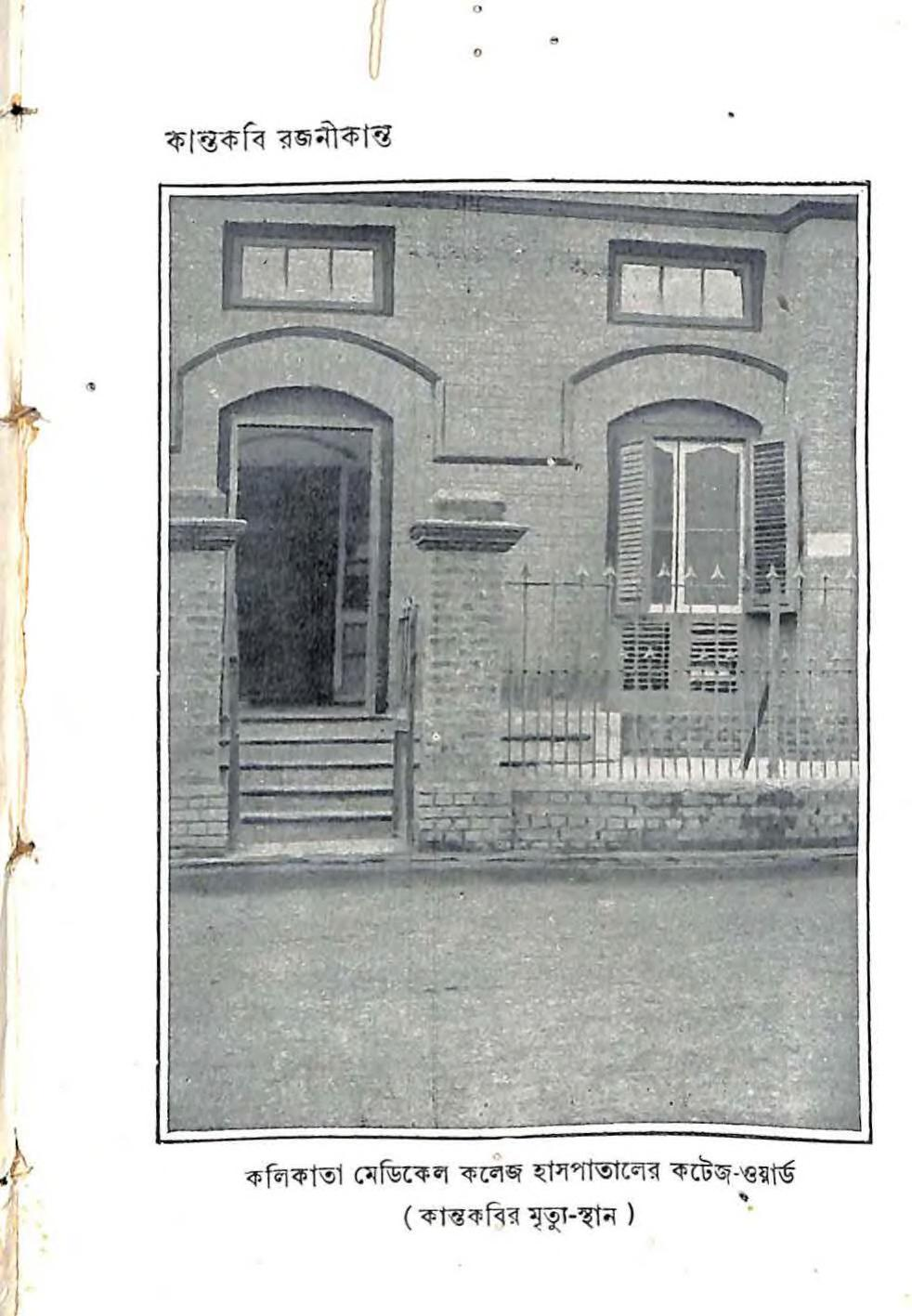
Kolkata Medical college hospital cottage ward, where poet Rajanikanta Sen died.

== Legacy ==
- Many singers from Bengal, India and Bangladesh have recorded his songs through ages. They include Indubala Devi, K. L. Saigal, Juthika Roy, Pannalal Bhattacharya, Dilipkumar Roy, Chhabi Bandyopadhyay, Hemanta Mukhopadhyay, Sandhya Mukhopadhyay, Krishna Chattopadhyay, Neela Majumdar, Dilip Kumar Roy (grandson of Rajanikanta Sen), Anup Ghoshal, Nishith Sadhu, Nupurchanda Ghosh, Arghya Sen, Aarti Mukherji, Manna Dey, Manabendra Mukhopadhyay, Iffat Ara Dewan, Utpala Sen and many others.
- A statute of Rajanikanta Sen has been placed in Hedua Park, Kolkata.
- A public library, "Kabi Rajanikanta Smriti Songsod O Pathagar", is proposed to be constructed in the Bhangabari Village, Benkuchi, Sirajgaunj, Bangladesh, commemorating birthplace of Rajanikanta Sen.

== Bibliography ==
- Sahitya Sangsad. Rajanikanta Kabyo Guchho.
- Manoranjan Sen (1972). Kanto Geeti Malya, Calcutta.
- Riddhi Bandopadhyay (2016). Rajanikanta, Patra Bharati.
- Rajanikanta Sen (1905). Kalyani (কল্যাণী)
- Rajanikanta Sen (1902). Bani (বাণী)
- Pandit, Nalini Ranjan (1921). Kanta Kabi Rajanikanta, Bengal Book Company, Calcutta
