= Lalon =

Bengali spiritual leader and oral philosopher (1772–1890)

Fakir Lalon
- লালন
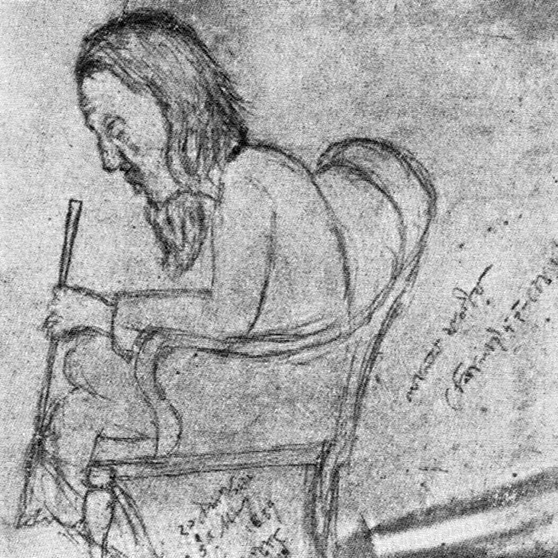
- Portrait by Jyotirindranath Tagore (1884)
- Pronunciation: [ˈlalon]
- Born: 1774; Jhenaidah District, Bengal Subah (now Jhenaidah, Bangladesh)
- Died: 17 October 1890 (aged 115–116); Kushtia, Bengal Presidency, British India (now Kushtia, Bangladesh)
- Resting place: Mausoleum of Lalon Shah, Kumarkhali, Kushtia, Bangladesh
- Occupations: Spiritual leader; Philosopher; Mystic poet; Social reformer

Lalon (Note: Bengali: [ˈlalon].) (Bengali: লালন, pronounced [ˈlalon]; 1774 – 17 October 1890), also known as Lalon Shah, Lalon Fakir, Lalon Shai, and Shahji, was a Bengali spiritual leader, philosopher, mystic poet and social reformer. Born in what is now Khulna Division in Bangladesh, Lalon was a disciple of Malam Shah and Siraj Shah. He is regarded as an icon of Bengali culture, for inspiring and influencing many poets and social thinkers including Rabindranath Tagore, Kazi Nazrul Islam and Allen Ginsberg. Lalon's philosophy of humanity rejects all distinctions of caste, class, and creed and takes a stand against theological conflicts and racism. It denies all worldly affairs in search of the soul and embodied the socially transformative role of sub-continental Sufism and Bhakti.

Lalon founded the institute known as Lalon Akhra in Cheuriya, about 2 kilometres (1.2 mi) from Kushtia railway station in southwestern Bangladesh. His disciples dwell mostly in Bangladesh and Indian states of West Bengal, Tripura and Assam’s Barak Valley. Every year on the occasion of his death anniversary, thousands of his disciples and followers assemble at Lalon Akhra and pay homage to him through celebration and discussion of his songs and philosophy for three days.

In 2004, Lalon was ranked 12 in BBC's poll of the Greatest Bengali of all time.

== Biography ==
Everyone wonders, "What religion does Lalon belong to in this world?"
Lalon says, "What does religion look like?
I've never seen the true color of religion."
Some wear beads as necklace (Hindu rosaries),
others count beads as Tasbih (Muslim rosaries),
and so people say
they belong to a different religion.
But do you bear the sign of your religion
when you come (to this world) or when you leave (this world)?

— Lalon

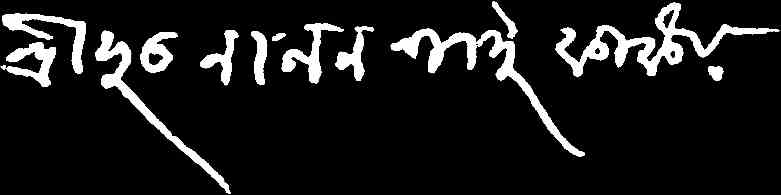
Lalon's name as written, in a late 19th-century manuscript, by his disciple and scribe Bholai Shah, in unconventional Bengali orthography

There are few reliable sources for the details of Lalon's early life as he was reticent in revealing his past. Based on the newspapers and essays of the time, Lalon was born in Bharara village in Kushtia District in a low-caste Hindu family. Lalon had no formal education. Uwe Skoda places his birth to Jhenaidah, Bengal Subah.

Sunil Gangopadhyay related in his book "Moner Manush" that Lalon, during a pilgrimage to the temple of Jagannath with others of his native village, contracted smallpox and was abandoned by his companions on the banks of the Kaliganga River. Malam Shah and his wife Matijan, members of the weaver community in a Muslim-populated village, Cheuriya, found him faint and took him to their home to convalesce. While he was growing up, he found his mentor Siraj Sain, a Baul saint of that village.

Lalon lived within the zamindari of the Tagores in Kushtia and had visited the Tagore family. It is said that zamindar Jyotirindranath Tagore sketched the only portrait of Lalon in 1889 in his houseboat on the river Padma. Lalon died at Chheuriya on 17 October 1890 aged 118. The news of his death was first published in the newspaper Gram Barta Prokashika, run by Kangal Harinath. Lalon was buried at the middle of his dwelling place known as his Akhra. Researchers note that Lalon was a close friend of Kangal Harinath, one of the contemporary social reformers and a disciple of Lalon.

== Philosophy ==
How does the Unknown bird go,
into the cage and out again,
Could I but seize it,
I would put the fetters of my heart,
around its feet.
The cage has eight rooms and nine closed doors;
From time to time fire flares out;.
Above there is a main room,
The mirror-chamber

— Lalon's song translated by Brother James

Lalon was against religious conflict and many of his songs mock identity politics that divide communities and generate violence. He even rejected nationalism at the apex of the anti-colonial nationalist movements in the Indian subcontinent. He did not believe in classes or castes, the fragmented, hierarchical society and took a stand against racism. Lalon does not fit the conventional “mystical” or “spiritual” archetype who renounces worldly life in search of the soul; rather, he embodies the socially transformative spirit of subcontinental Bhakti and Sufism. He believed in the power of music to alter the intellectual and emotional state in order to be able to understand and appreciate life itself.

The texts of his songs engage in philosophical discourses of Bengal, continuing Tantric traditions of the Indian subcontinent, particularly Nepal, Bengal and the Gangetic plains. He appropriated various philosophical positions emanating from Hindu, Jainist, Buddhist and Islamic traditions, developing them into a coherent discourse without falling into eclecticism or syncretism. He explicitly identified himself with the Nadiya school, with Advaita Acharya, Nityananda and Chaitanya. He was greatly influenced by the social movement initiated by Chaitanya against differences of caste, creed and religion. His songs reject any absolute standard of right and wrong and show the triviality of any attempt to divide people whether materially or spiritually. Distinguished bilingual writer and university academic Dr. Rashid Askari in his Literary Encyclopedia entry on Lalon Shah said, "Lalon’s social awakening, noncommunal views, liberal attitudes, humanistic ideals and spiritual values have added a new dimension to his identity as a baul and contributed to the creation of a reawakening in the rural life of Bengal. This is why he is sometimes compared with the great social and religious reformer Raja Rammohun Roy (1772-1833)".

== Works ==
Lalon composed numerous songs and poems, which describe his philosophy. It is estimated that Lalon composed about 2,000–10,000 songs, of which only about 800 songs are generally considered authentic. Lalon left no written copies of his songs, which were transmitted orally and only later transcribed by his followers. Also, most of his followers could not read or write either, so few of his songs are found in written form. Rabindranath Tagore published some of the Lalon song in the monthly Prabasi magazine of Kolkata.

Among his most popular songs are:

- Shob Loke Koy Lalon Ki Jat Shongshare,
- Khachar Bhitor Ochin Pakhi kyamne ashe jaay,
- Jat Gelo Jat Gelo Bole,
- Dekhna Mon Jhokmariay Duniyadari,
- Pare Loye Jao Amai,
- Milon Hobe Koto Dine,
- Ar Amare Marishne Ma,
- Tin Pagoler Holo Mela
- Dhonno Dhonno Boli Tare
- Emon Manob Jonom Aar Ki Hobe

The songs of Lalon aim at an indescribable reality beyond realism. He was observant of social conditions and his songs spoke of day-to-day problems in simple yet moving language. His philosophy was expressed orally, as well as through songs and musical compositions using folk instruments that could be made from materials available at home; the ektara (one-string musical instrument) and the duggi (drum).

Songs of Lalon were mainly confined to the baul sects. After the independence of Bangladesh, they reached the urban people through established singers. Many of them started using instruments other than the ektara and baya. Some started using classical bases for a polished presentation to appeal to the senses of the urban masses.

According to Farida Parveen, a renowned Lalon singer, the pronunciation of the words were also refined in order to make their meanings clearer, whereas the bauls' pronunciations are likely to have local influence.

== Legacy and depictions in popular culture ==
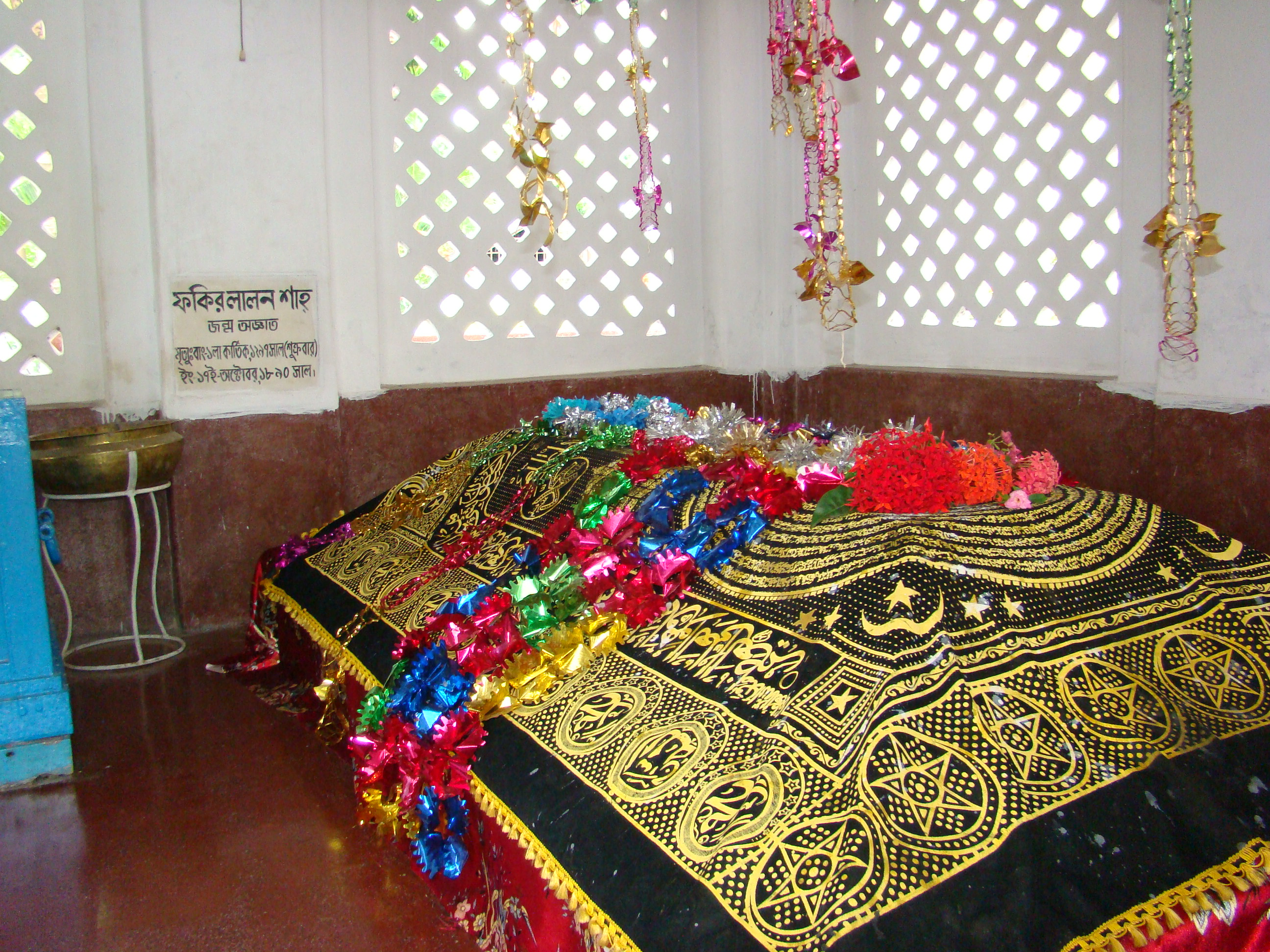
Tomb of Lalon

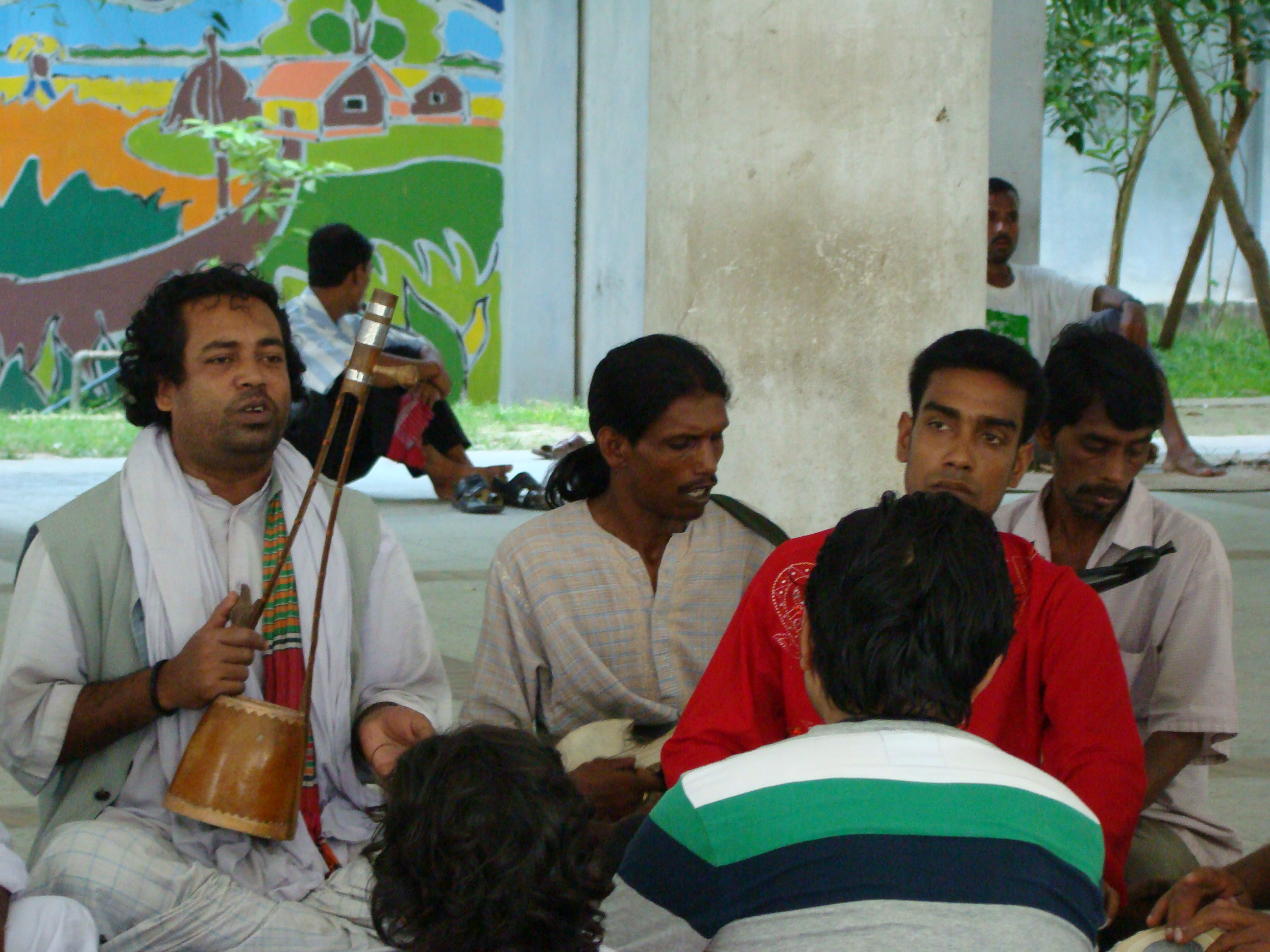
Disciples practicing Lalon's song at his Akhra

In 1963, a mausoleum and research centre were built at the site of his shrine in Kushtia, Bangladesh. Thousands of people come to the shrine (known in Bengali as an Akhra) twice a year, at Dol Purnima in the month of Falgun (February to March) and in October, on the occasion of the anniversary of his death. During these three-day song melas, people, particularly Muslim fakirs and Bauls pay tribute. Among the modern singers of Baul music Farida Parveen and Anusheh Anadil are internationally known for singing Lalon songs. M Shahinoor Rahman's thesis Bengali poet Fakir Lalon Shah: Oral poetry and tradition in the social context of contemporary Bangladesh on his life philosophy is one of the basic work.

The Lalon Shah Bridge crossing the Padma River was named after him in 2004.

A male student's dormitory in Islamic University, Bangladesh at Kushtia is named after him as Lalon Shah Hall.

=== Film and literature ===
Lalon has been portrayed in literature, film, television drama and in the theatre. The first biopic of Lalon titled Lalon Fakir (1973) was directed by Syed Hasan Imam. Lalan Fakir, an Indian Bengali-language biographical drama film directed by Shakti Chatterjee released in 1978 and starred Ashim Kumar as Lalon. Allen Ginsberg wrote a poem in 1992 named "After Lalon", where he warned people against the dangers of fame and the attachments to the worldly things.

In 2004, Tanvir Mokammel directed the film Lalon in which Raisul Islam Asad portrayed Lalon.

Prosenjit Chatterjee portrayed Lalan in the Moner Manush, a 2010 Bengali film based on the life and philosophy of Lalon. The film was an adaptation of Sunil Gangopadhyay's biographical novel of the same name. This film directed by Goutam Ghose, won award for the "best feature film on national integration" at the 58th Indian National Film Awards. It also won Best Film prize at the 41st International Film Festival of India held at Goa from 22 Nov to 2 December 2010.

== Gallery ==
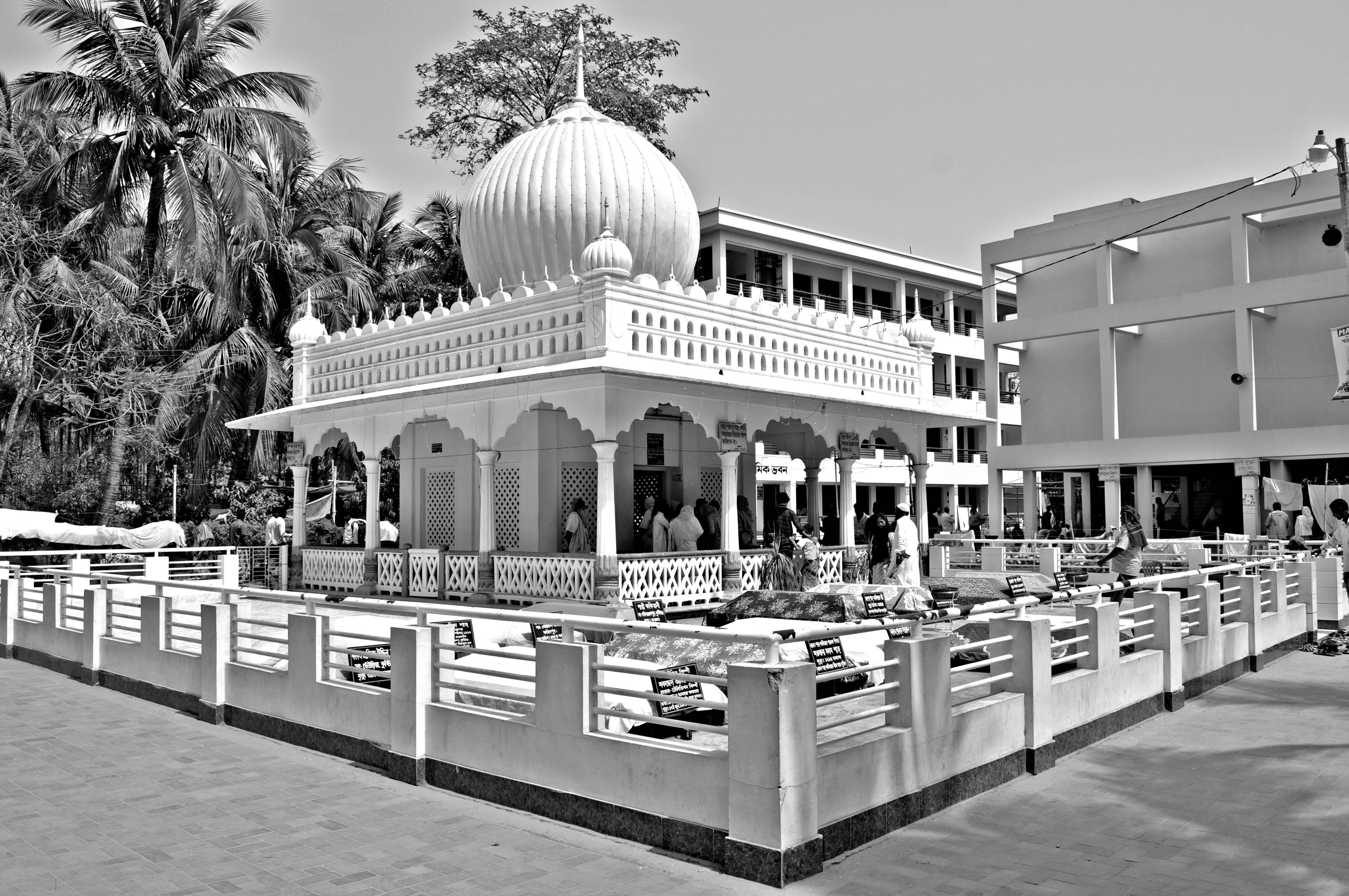
Tomb of Lalon, Kushtia District

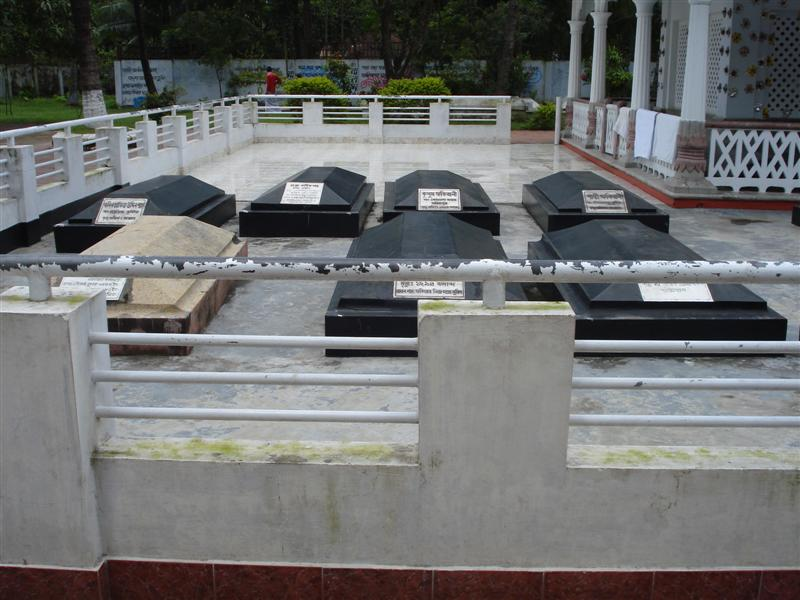
Lalon's masters' and disciples' grave

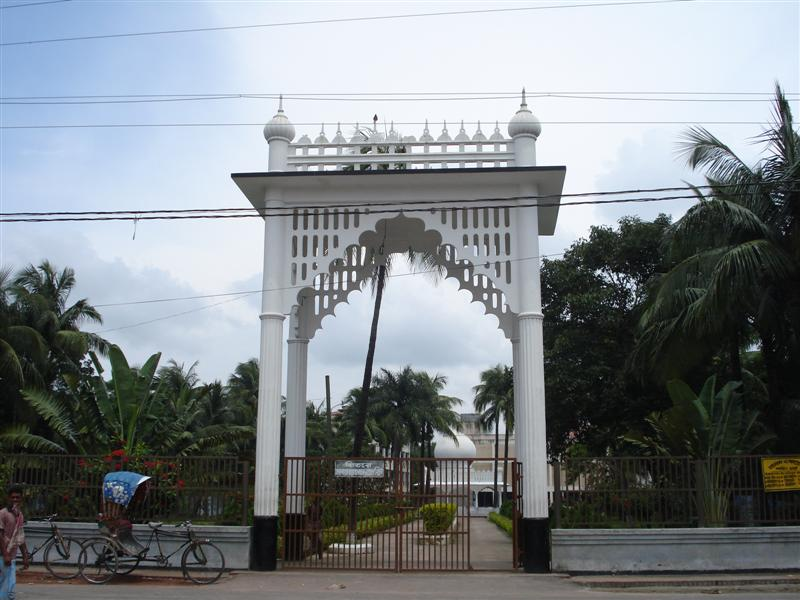
Gate of the shrine of Lalon

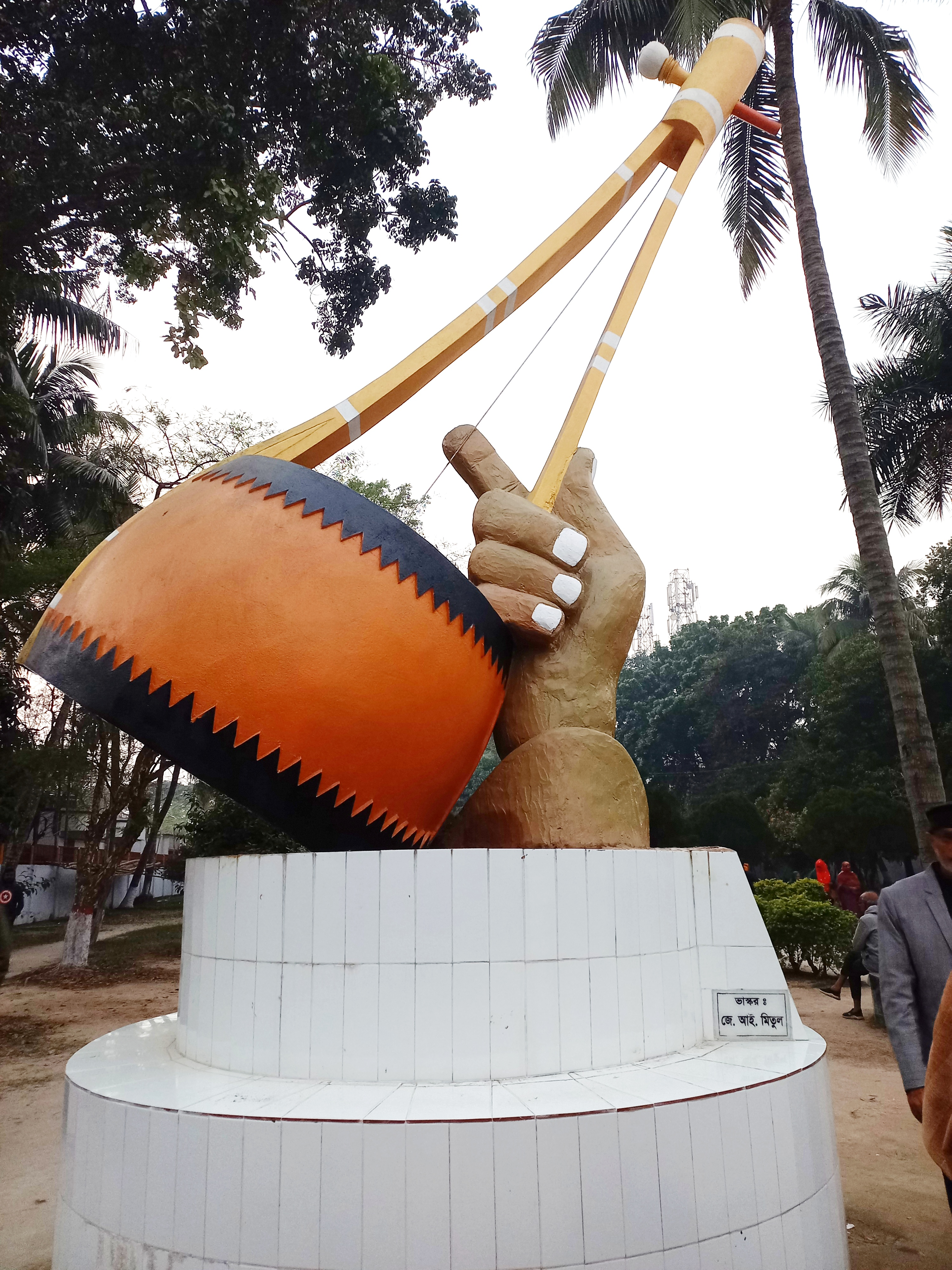
"Shainjir Ektara" a sculpture depicting Saint Lalon Shah

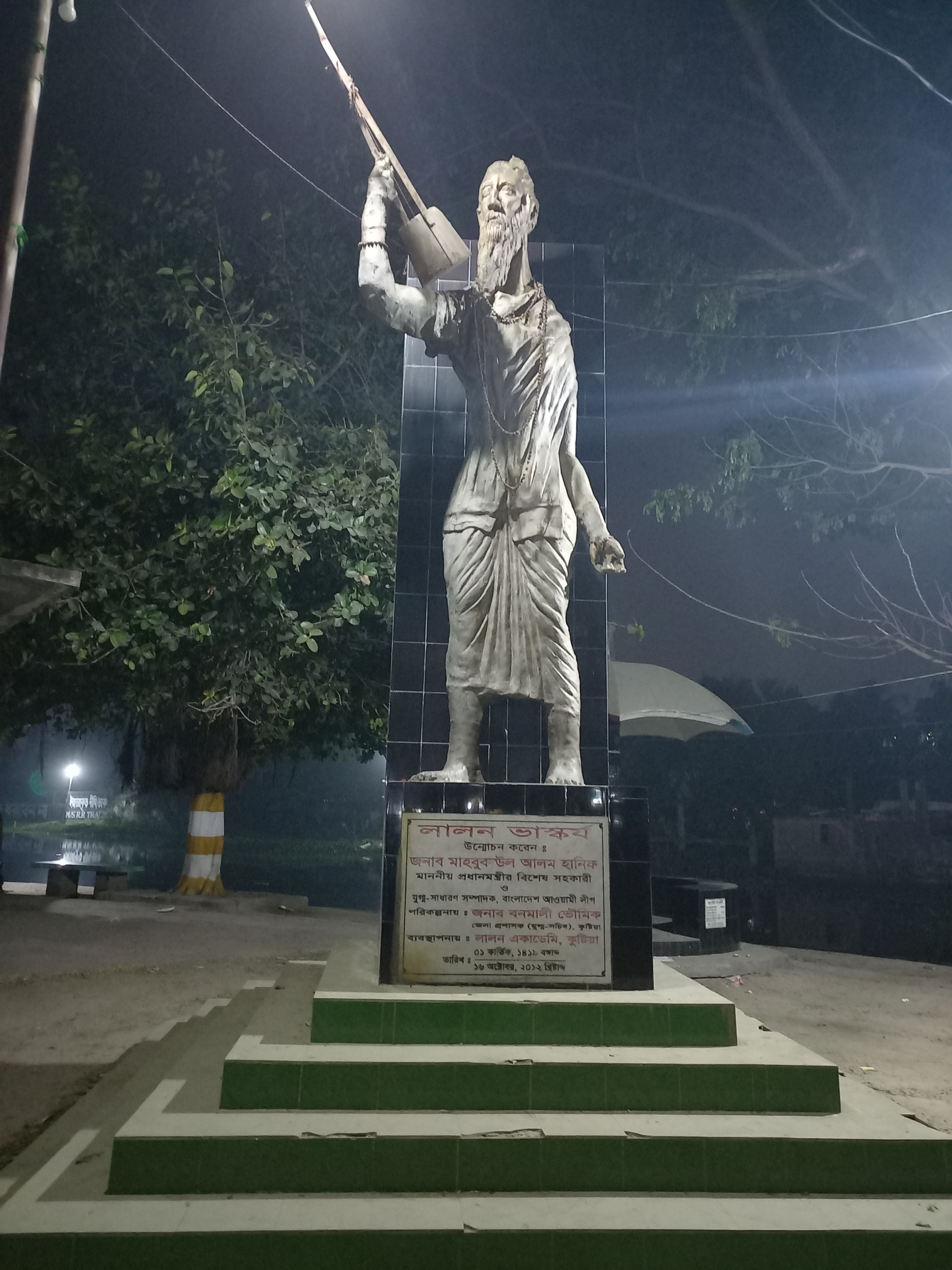
A sculpture of Lalon Shah at Kushtia

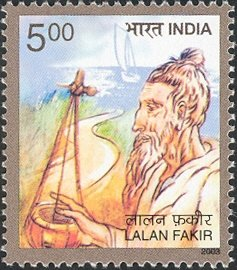
Lalan Fakir Stamp of India - 2003

== See also ==
- Music of Bengal
