= Kumarkhali =

Kumarkhali কুমারখালী
- Municipality and Town
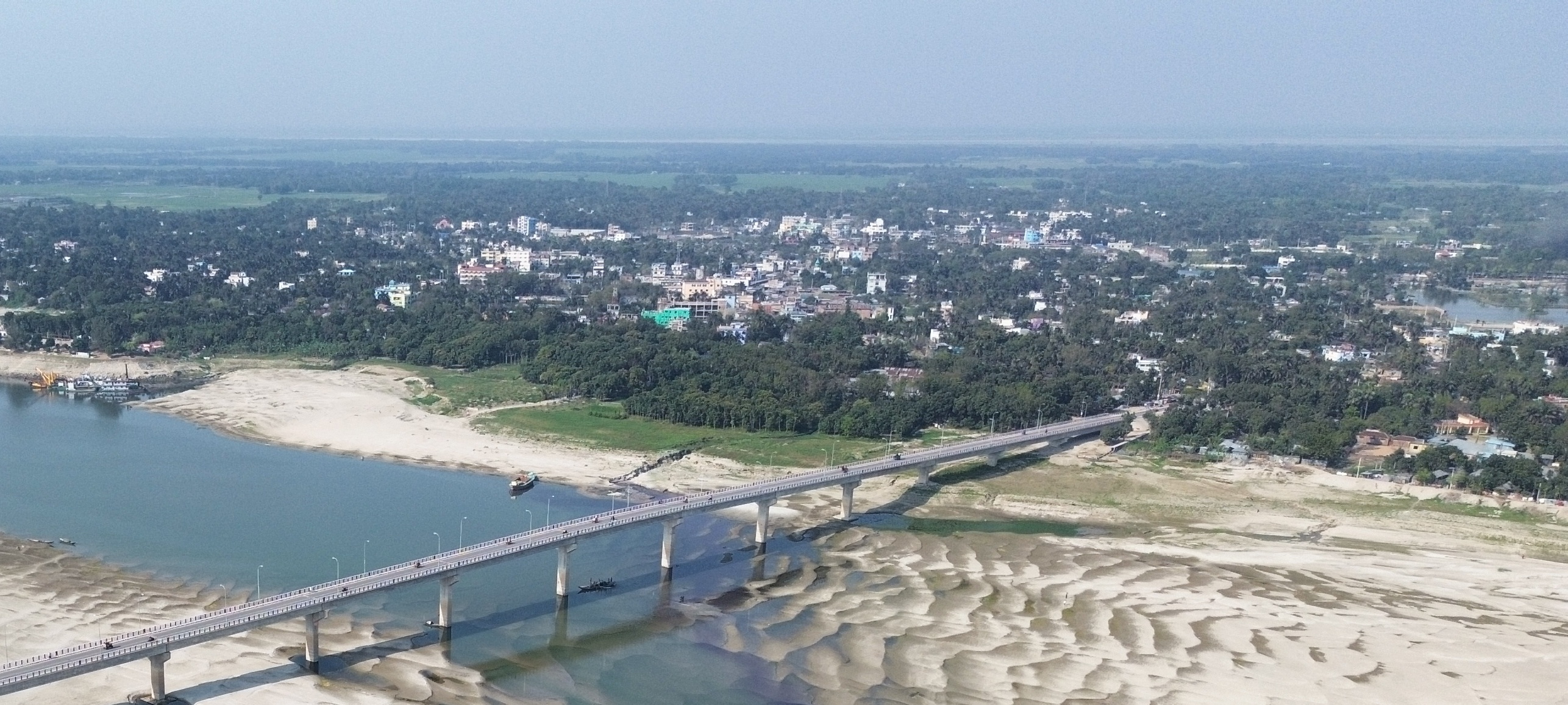
- Garai Bridge and the town

- Location within Khulna division Location within Bangladesh
- Coordinates: 23.8582°N 89.2428°E
- Country: Bangladesh
- Division: Khulna
- District: Kushtia
- Upazila: Kumarkhali
- Municipality established: April 1, 1869; 157 years ago

Government
  - Type: Municipality
  - Body: Kumarkhali Municipality

Area
  - Urban: 10.50 km^{2} (4.05 sq mi)

Population
  - Urban: 24,468
  - Urban density: 2,330/km^{2} (6,035/sq mi)
- Time zone: UTC+6 (Bangladesh Standard Time)
- Postcode: 7010
- Municipal code: 44
- Website: pourashava.kumarkhali.kushtia.gov.bd

Kumarkhali Municipality mahallah geocode map

Kumarkhali (Bengali: কুমারখালী) is a municipality in the Kushtia District of Bangladesh. The town is situated on the bank of the Gorai River. Kumarkhali has been well known since the British Raj period for its traditional handloom industry. At that time, it developed as a river port and commercial center. The town is especially famous for its contribution to literature, and culture. It is often referred to as the City of Museums and the Panam City of Kushtia. The area of Kumarkhali Municipality is 10.50 square kilometres (4.05 mi^{2}). According to the 2022 Bangladeshi census, the Kumarkhali municipal area has a population of 24,468.

== History ==
Within Kushtia District, Kumarkhali is one of the comparatively older settlements. It was prominently shown in the map of James Rennell. During the period of the East India Company, it was a commercial center for silk and indigo. In 1795, the Kumarkhali Christian Cemetery was established, although it is believed that the oldest grave in the cemetery dates back to 1790. In 1855, Kumarkhali Thana was established under Pabna District. In 1857, Kumarkhali was made a subdivision. On 1 April 1869, Kumarkhali Municipality was established. In 1871, the Kumarkhali subdivision was abolished, and Kumarkhali and Khoksa Thana were placed under the Kushtia subdivision, making Kumarkhali a part of Nadia District.

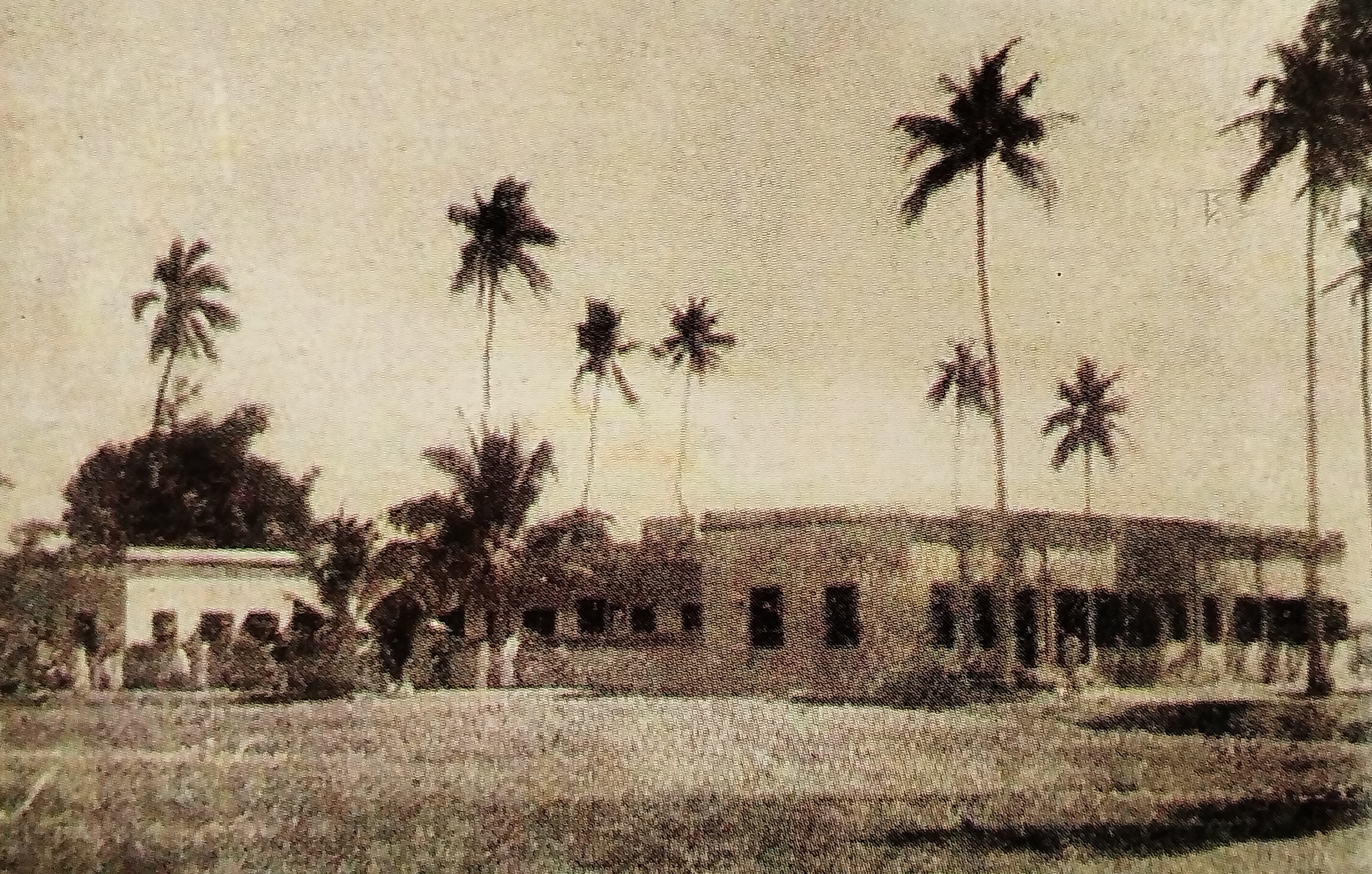
The building of Kumarkhali Mathuranath Secondary School, which was washed away by the Gorai River

In 1856, on the banks of the Gorai River, the Kumarkhali Mathuranath Secondary School was founded in an abandoned indigo factory, making it one of the oldest schools in present-day Kushtia District. In 1863, the Kumarkhali Government Girls' School was established, which is regarded as the first female educational institution in Bangladesh. Harinath Majumdar was the first teacher of this school. In 1872, a poverty-friendly library was established here, with Jaldhar Sen serving as president and Harinath Majumdar as secretary. In 1961, the library was renamed Kumarkhali Public Library.

On 1 January 1871, the railway line from Kushtia to Goalanda Ghat was inaugurated, during which the Kumarkhali Railway Station was constructed.

During the British period, an important market developed in Kumarkhali where coarse cloth woven by local weavers was sold in large quantities. There was also a dyeing factory where locally produced yarn was dyed. A medical center was also established in this period, operated with local donations. Between 1901 and 1905, Kumarkhali Thana experienced a malaria epidemic, with 38.65 percent of its population dying from the disease, resulting in a significant demographic change. At that time, Kumarkhali Thana was among the most malaria-affected thanas of Nadia District.

== Demographics ==
Historical population

Year	Pop.	±% p.a.
1872	5,251	—
1881	6,041	+1.57%
1891	6,165	+0.20%
1901	4,584	−2.92%
1911	3,769	−1.94%
1921	3,763	−0.02%

Year	Pop.	±% p.a.
1974	10,544	+1.96%
1981	13,828	+3.95%
1991	11,645	−1.70%
2001	19,707	+5.40%
2011	21,914	+1.07%
2022	24,468	+1.01%

According to the 2022 Census of Bangladesh, Kumarkhali Municipality has a total of 6,802 households and 24,468 residents. Among them, there are 11,898 males, 12,568 females, and 2 hijras.

In Kumarkhali Municipality, there are a total of 7,803 employed persons, of which 6,838 are men and 965 are women. On the other hand, 6,719 persons are engaged in household work, of whom 6,551 are women. Among the employed population, 71.45% are engaged in service-related work, 24.53% in industry, and 4.02% in agriculture.

=== Religion ===
Religion in Kumarkhali Municipality (2022)
1. Islam (89.0%)
2. Hinduism (11.0%)
3. Others (0.00%)

According to the 2022 Population and Housing Census of Bangladesh, only followers of Islam and Hinduism reside in Kumarkhali Municipality. Out of the total 24,468 residents, 21,770 were adherents of Islam and 2,698 of Hinduism.

According to the 2011 Population and Housing Census of Bangladesh, out of 21,914 residents in Kumarkhali Municipality, 19,264 were followers of Islam, 2,648 of Hinduism, and 2 belonged to other religions.
