= Kangal Harinath =

Bengali poet and musician (1833–1896)

- কাঙ্গাল হরিনাথ
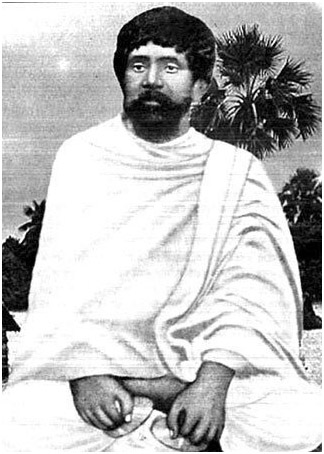
- Born: Harinath Majumdar; 20 July 1833; Kumarkhali village, Kushtia District, Bengal Presidency, British India
- Died: 18 April 1896 (aged 62)
- Other names: Kangal Fikir Chand, Fikir Chand Baul

Harinath Majumdar (20 July 1833 – 18 April 1896), better known as Kangal Harinath, was a Bengali journalist, poet, writer, and Baul singer. He is the writer of Bijoy Basanta (1859), which is in the list of the first published Bengali novels.

== Early life and career ==
Harinath was born in Kumarkhali village, Kushtia District, now in Bangladesh. He took up journalism to promote the cause of the poor and oppressed. He started writing in the Sangbad Prabhakar and in 1863 started publishing a journal, Gram Barta Prokashika. The journal was funded by Swarnakumari Devi. In 1873 Harinath set up a printing press for printing this journal.

He was a disciple of Lalon Shah. He established a Baul group named Kangal Fakir Chander Dal (Group of the Penniless Fakir Chand) in 1880. His songs had a profound influence on many thinkers of the day, including Rabindranath Tagore and Akshay Kumar Maitreya.

On his death, the Indian Mirror commented "The district of Nuddea has lost one of its great men".

== Notable works ==
Harinath wrote 18 books. Some of his works are:

- Bijoy Basanta (1859)
- Charu-Charitro (1863)
- Kavita Kaomudi (1866)
- Okkrur Sangbad (1873)
- Chittachapala (1876)
- Kangal-Fakir Chand Fakirer Gitabali (1293-1300 Bengali Year)
