= Amala =

Amala may refer to:

== People ==
- Amala Akkineni, Indian actress
- Amala Chebolu, Indian playback singer in the Telugu film industry
- Amala Paul (born 1991), Indian actress
- Amala Shankar (1919–2020), Indian dancer
- Amala and Kamala, two girls discovered in 1920 who were allegedly raised by wolves in India
- Amala Ratna Zandile Dlamini, known professionally as Doja Cat, American rapper, singer, songwriter, and record producer

== Places ==
- Amala, Iran, a village in Kermanshah Province, Iran
- Amala Nagar, a village in Kerala, India

== Other ==
- Amla (disambiguation)
- Aonla (disambiguation)
- Amala (food), a food from Nigeria
- Amala (mythology), a Native American mythological giant
- Amala (TV series), an Indian television series
- Amala Institute of Medical Sciences in Thrissur, India
- Seeds of the Nectandra trees, used in pre-Columbian South American ritual
- Scopula amala, a moth of family Geometridae
- Amala (album), a 2018 album by Doja Cat
