= Amla, Mirpur =

Amla
- village
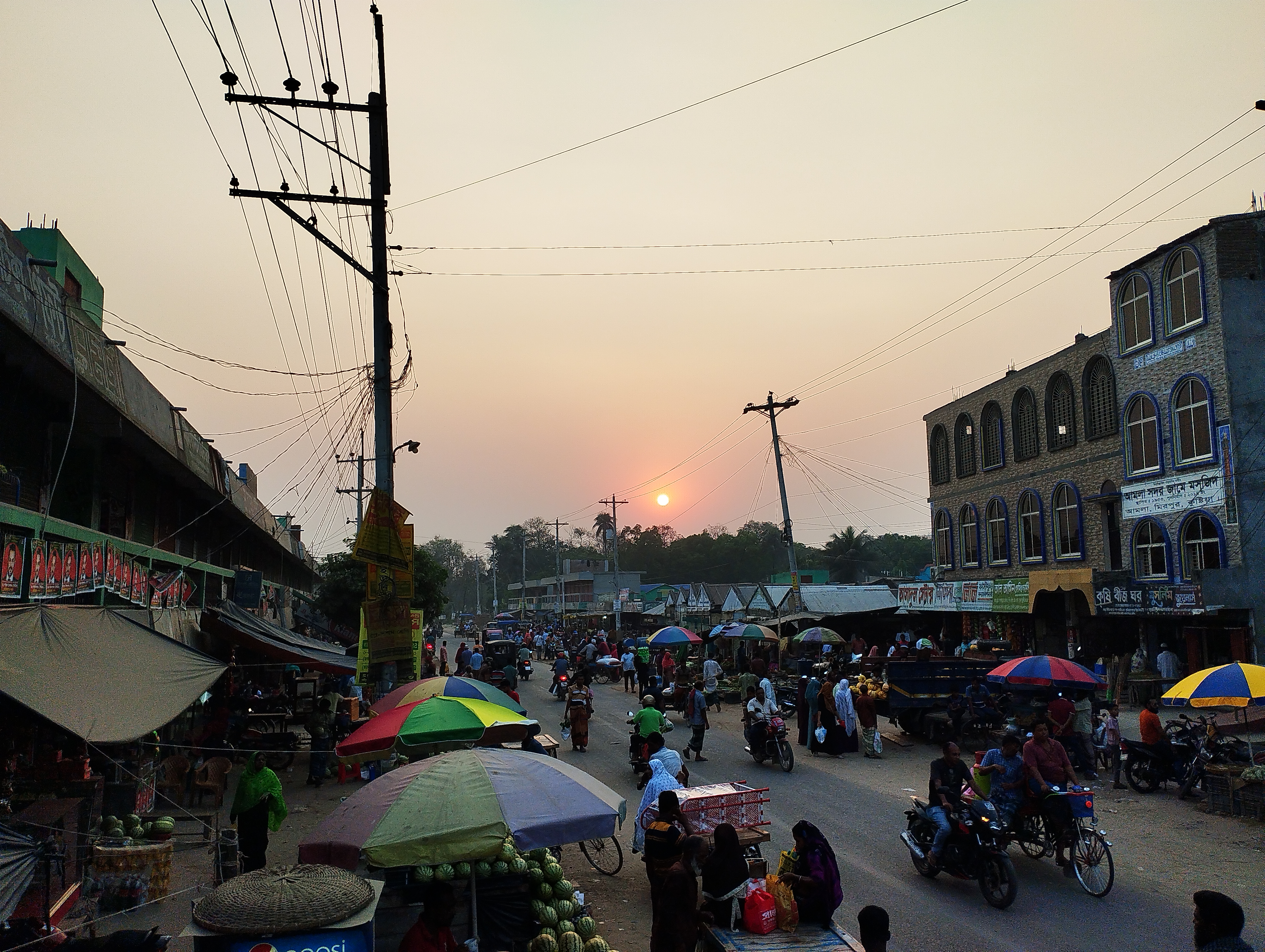
- Amla Bazar
- Nickname: Village of Swimmers
- Location within Khulna division Location within Bangladesh
- Coordinates: 23.907585°N 88.928958°E
- Country: Bangladesh
- Division: Khulna
- District: Kushtia
- Upazila: Mirpur
- Union: Amla; Sadarpur

Area
  - Total: 3.3 km^{2} (1.3 sq mi)

Population (2022)
  - Total: 6,910
  - Density: 2,100/km^{2} (5,400/sq mi)
- Postal code: Amla Sadarpur-7032

Amla (Bengali: আমলা) (also known as Amla-Sadarpur (Bengali: আমলা-সদরপুর)) is a village located on the bank of the Sagarkhali River in Kushtia District. It is known as the 'Village of Swimmers'. Administratively it is located in the Amla and Sadarpur unions of Mirpur Thana.

A weekly haat (rural market) is held at Amla Bazar. There is also a permanent police camp under Mirpur Thana located here. One of the four sub-divisional offices of the Kushtia Water Development Division is located in Amla, known as the 'Amla Pani Unnoyon Upo-Bibhag'.

== History ==
=== British India ===
During the period of British India, Amla was under Mirpur Thana of Kushtia subdivision in Nadia district. Amla was one of the important water bodies of Nadia district.

==== Bhagaban Nibash/Bhagaban Shah's House ====
Bhagabanchandra Shah was an influential zamindar of Amla. He constructed a zamindar house on approximately 20 bighas of land here. The estate contains four two-storied buildings, three courtyards, and ponds. At present, it is used as a dormitory of Amla Government College and as a police camp. Visitors from different places come to see this zamindar house.

=== Bangladesh Liberation War ===
During the Bangladesh Liberation War, the present Amla Government College served as a camp for the Pakistani army. Pakistani soldiers captured people from different places, killed them here, and dumped the bodies beside the secondary school. Amla was completely liberated from enemy control on 7 December.

=== Village of swimmers ===
Amla is known as a breeding ground for swimmers. More than a hundred swimmers from the village have competed at the national level. Swimmer Sabura Khatun, known as the 'Jolkonna', and SAF Games gold medalist Rubel Rana were born here.

The Amla Swimming Club was established in 1986 through the initiative of Amirul Islam, who was a sports teacher at Naoda Azampur Secondary School. Amirul Islam had once been selected as the best swimmer at the district level but lost the opportunity to compete at the divisional level. Since then, he has been training local boys and girls in swimming on his own initiative.

== Geography ==
Amla is located in Mirpur Thana, 24 km (15 mi) away from Kushtia. From here, the distance to Gangni and Meherpur is approximately 34 and 23 kilometres respectively. A canal of the Ganges-Kobadak Irrigation Project passes through the area.

Amla consists of the mouzas of 'Amla' and 'Bil Amla'. Amla mouza is located in Sadarpur and Amla Union. The total area of Amla is 820 acres (3.3 km^{2}). To the east lies Khayerpur of Amla Union, to the west are Guabari and Azampur of Sadarpur Union, to the north is Talbariya of Aria Union in Daulatpur Upazila;and to the south lies Azampur.

== Education ==
According to the 2022 Bangladesh census, the literacy rate of Amla was 60.43 percent for people aged 7 years and above. The literacy rate among males was 61.55 percent, while among females it was 59.38 percent.

=== Educational institutions ===
- Amla Government College – A college affiliated with the National University. It was established on 1 July 1972 on 6.3 acres (25,000 m^{2}) of land in Amla. It was nationalized in 1987.
- Amla Sadarpur Secondary School – Established in 1899 in Amla as 'Amla Sadarpur H.E. School'. It was later renamed 'Amla Sadarpur Multipurpose High School' and eventually 'Amla Sadarpur Secondary School'. The school was founded by Janaki Nath Saha. In 2001, the school received recognition from the Bangladesh Technical Education Board.
- Jahanara Secondary Girls School – Established in 1972 and recognized as a secondary school in 1989.

== Transport ==
=== Road ===
The Kushtia–Meherpur Regional Highway passes through Amla. Amla Bazar developed beside this road.

Amla has 2 upazila roads and 12 rural roads. The two upazila roads are:

1. Amla–Poradah Road – The total length of this road is 13.8 km (8.6 mi). There are 23 culverts/bridges on this road.

=== Bridge ===
There is a bridge over the Sagarkhali River on the Kushtia–Meherpur Highway in Amla, known as the 'Amla Bazar Bridge'. The bridge is 122 m (400 ft) long and 6.8 m (22 ft) wide.

== Notable people ==
- Sree Parabat – Bengali writer and journalist
- Piash Ahmed Nova – Bangladeshi footballer
- Rubel Rana – Bangladeshi swimmer

== Gallery ==
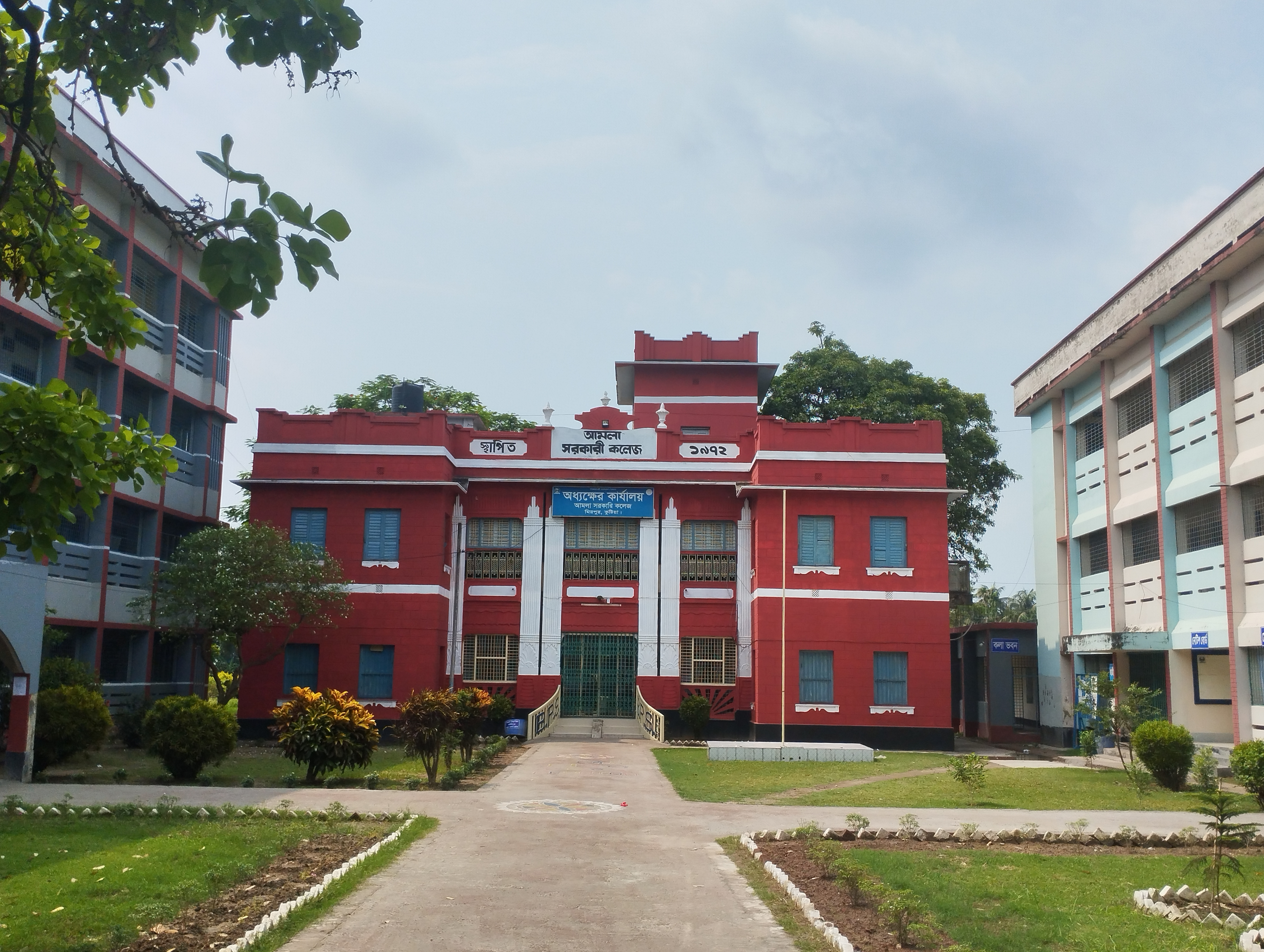
Administrative building of Amla Government College

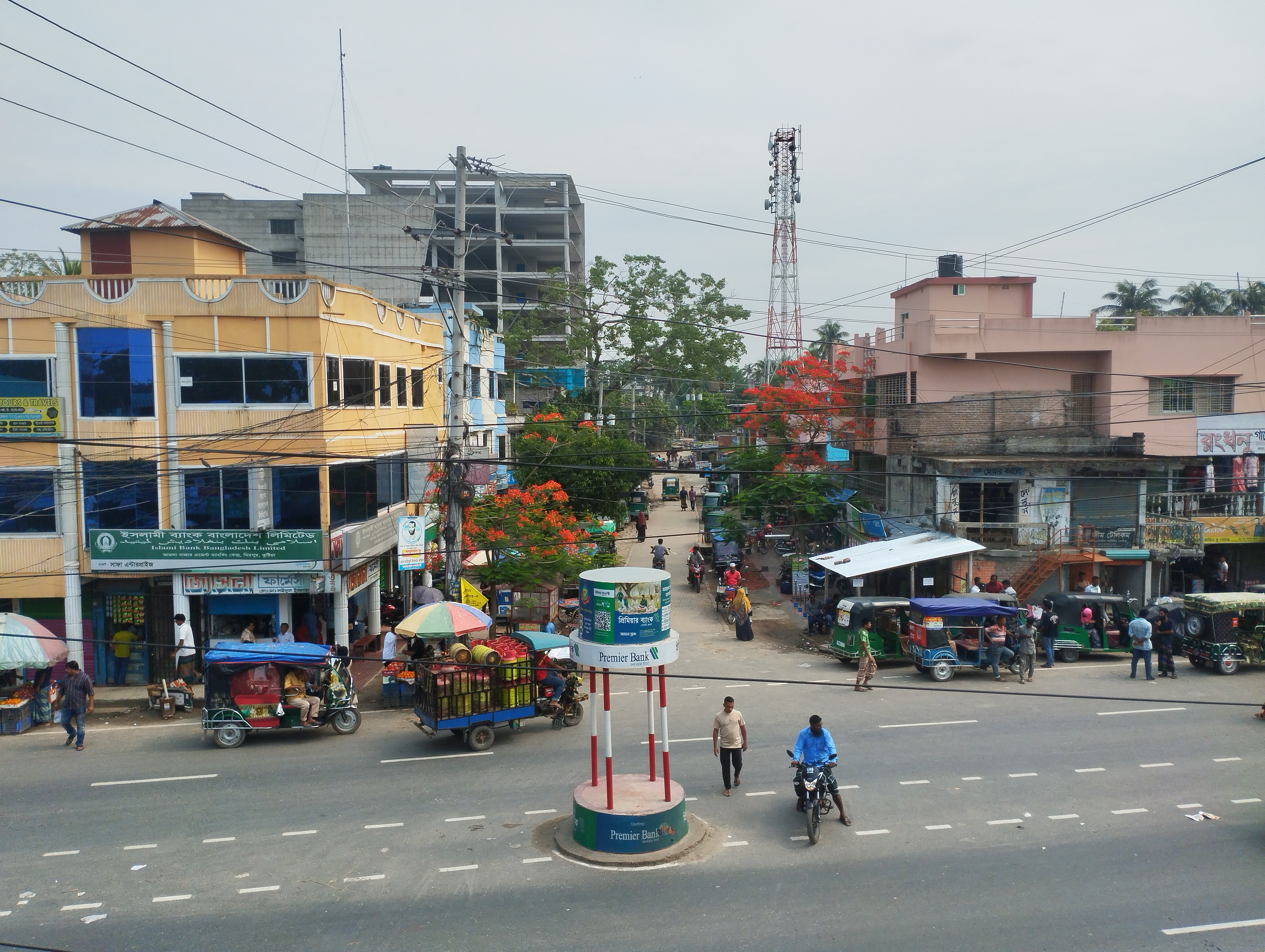
Amla Bazar intersection, Kushtia–Meherpur Regional Highway

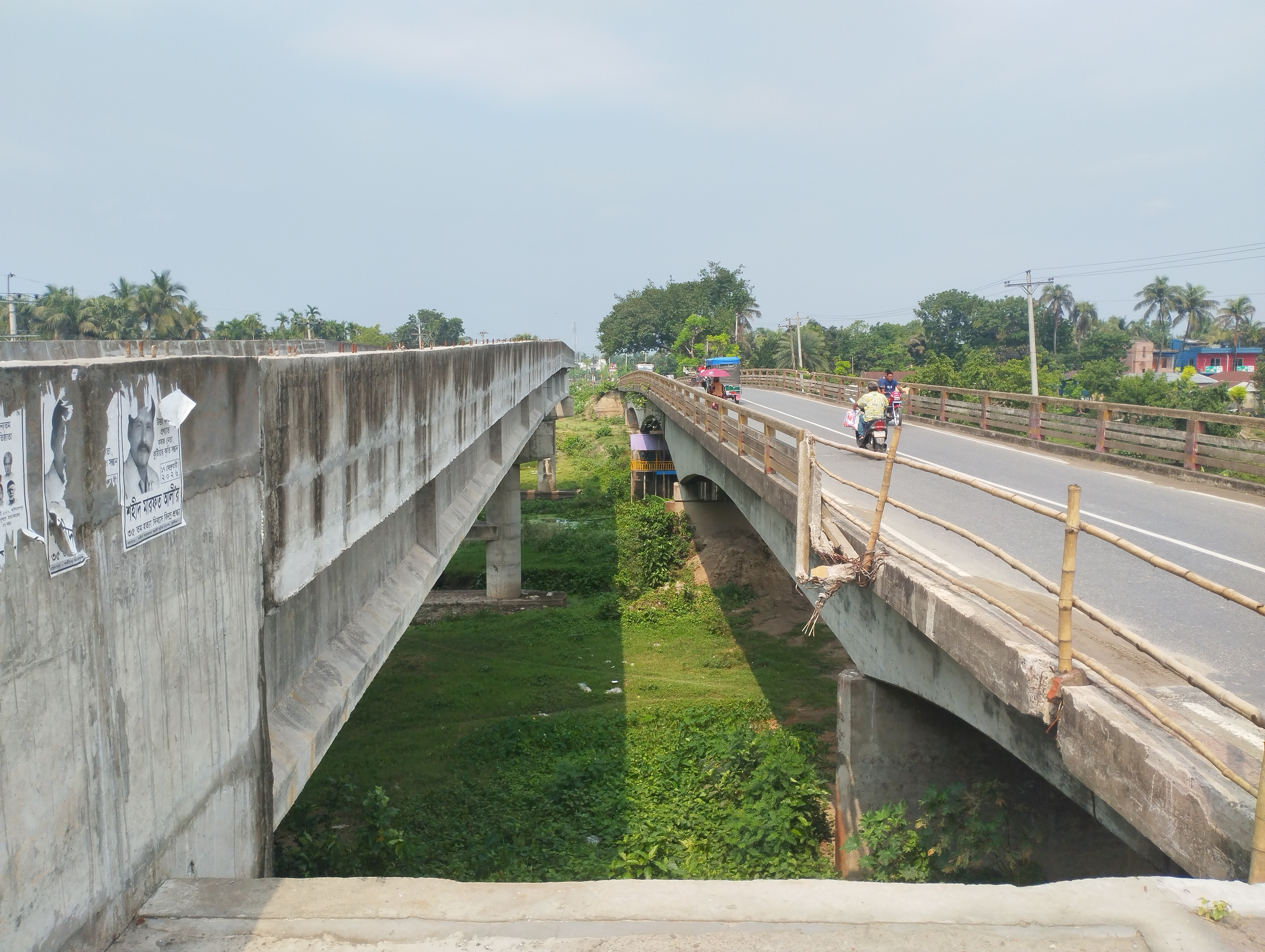
Amla Bazar Bridge, with the under-construction bridge on the left and the old bridge on the right

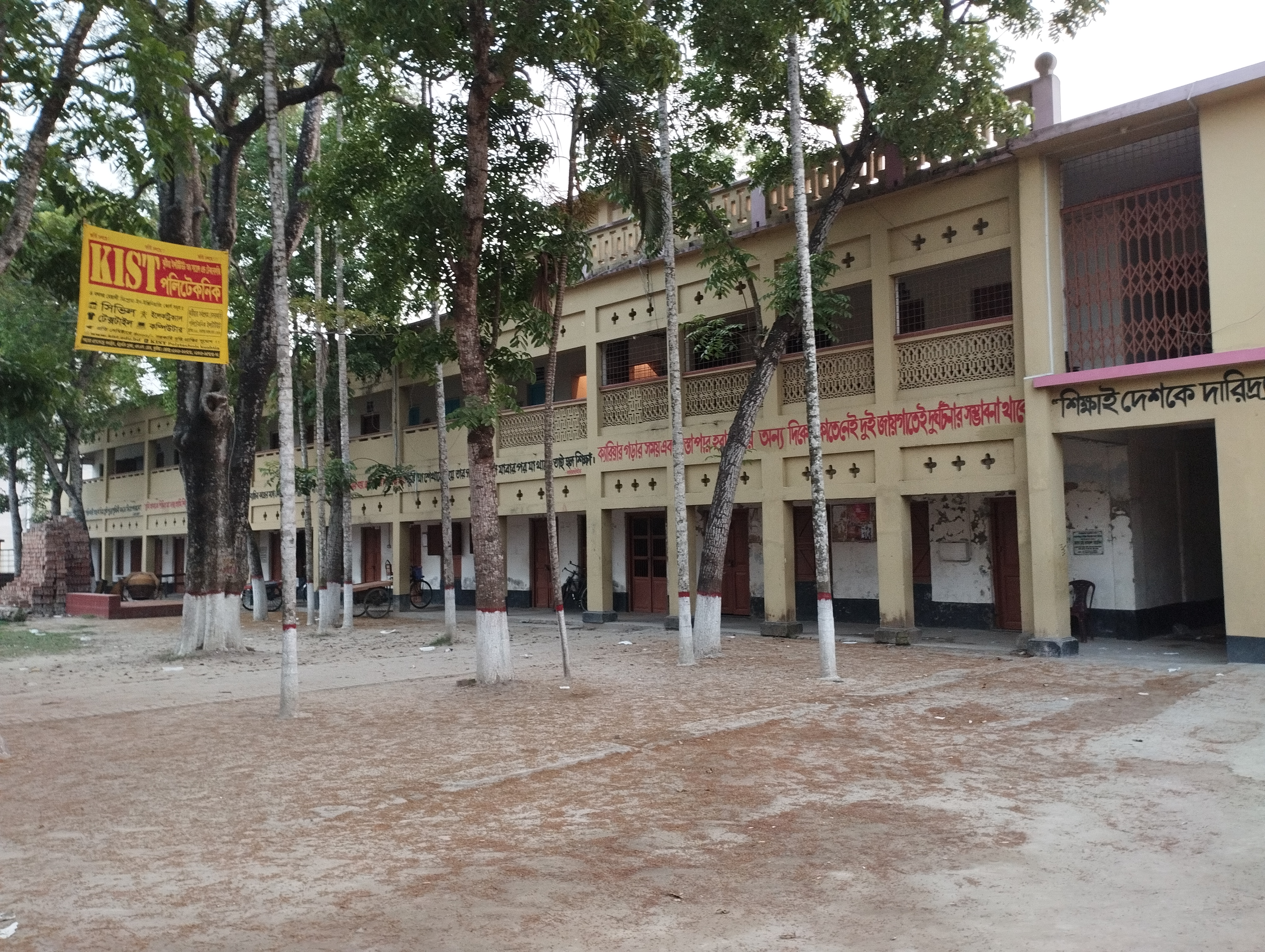
Amla Sadarpur Secondary School

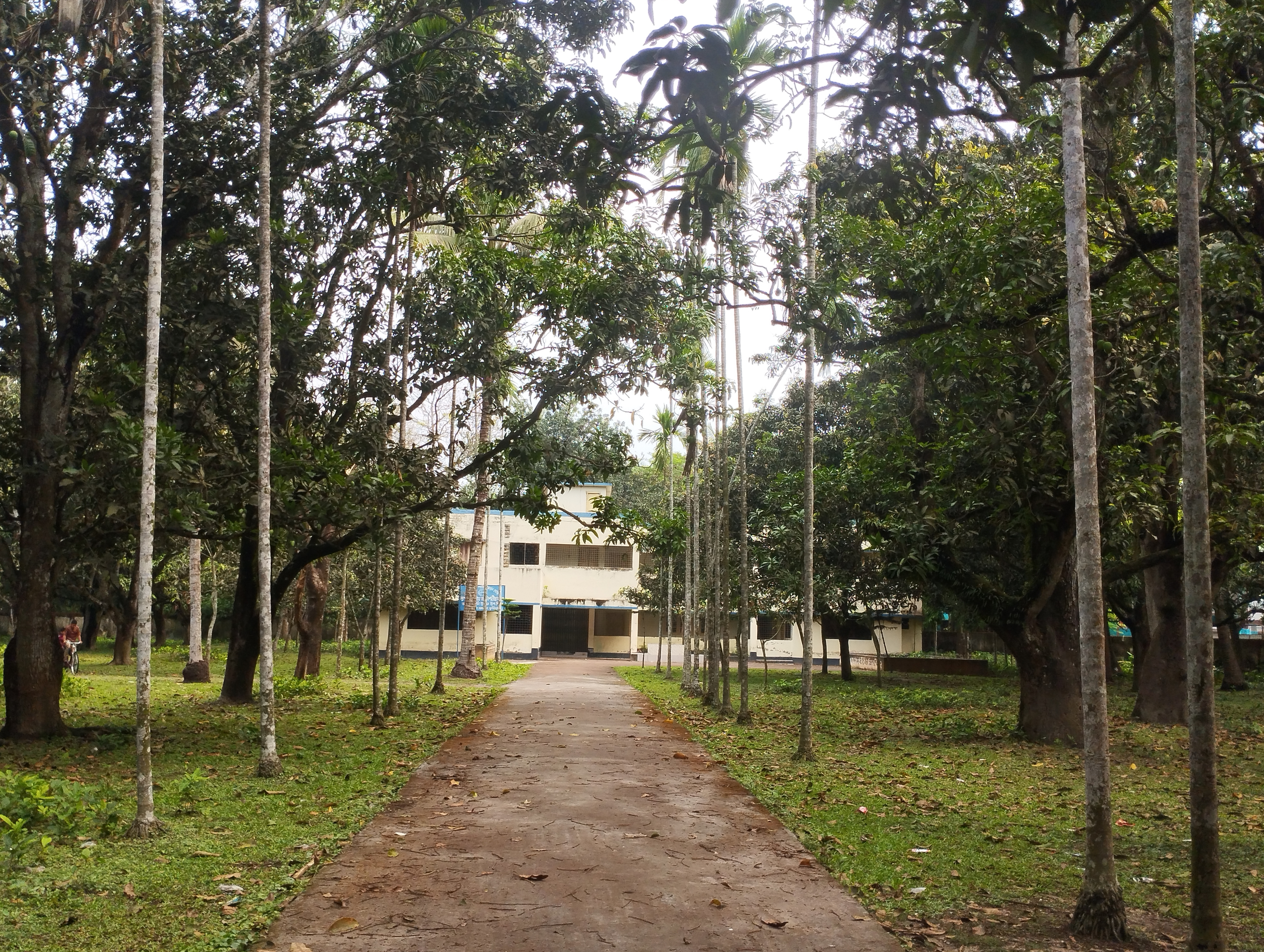
Amla Water Development Sub-Division
