= Khalishakundi, Daulatpur =

Village in Khulna, Bangladesh

Khalisakundi Khalishakundi/Khalisakandi
- Village/Bazaar/Mouza
- Location within Khulna division Location within Bangladesh
- Coordinates: 23.886301°N 88.873112°E
- Country: Bangladesh
- Division: Khulna
- District: Kushtia
- Upazila: Daulatpur
- Union: Khalishakundi Union

Area
  - Total: 6.41 km^{2} (2.47 sq mi)

Population (2022)
  - Total: 16,019
  - Density: 2,500/km^{2} (6,470/sq mi)
- Postal code: 7030
- Website: khalishakundi.com

Khalisakundi or Khalishakundi or Khalishakandi is a Bazaar, village and mouza in Kushtia District. It is located on the bank of the Mathabhanga River on the border of Gangni Upazila in Daulatpur Thana.

== History ==
The name Khalisakundi originated from the Kholisa fish.

Khalisakundi has remained under Daulatpur Thana since the time of British India. Khalishakundi Union Parishad was established in 1963.

During the Bangladesh Liberation War, the 'Khalisakundi Bridge' built over the Mathabhanga River in Khalisakundi was destroyed in order to resist the Pakistani military forces. The Pakistani army had established a camp there. They carried out a massacre in the area, in which 25 people were killed.

== Geography ==
The Kushtia–Meherpur Road passes through Khalisakundi. Khalisakundi has a total area of 1,583 acres (6.41 km^{2}). The Mathabhanga River flows along its western and southern sides.

To the east of Khalisakundi are Katlamari and Barobabaria villages of Sadarpur Union in Mirpur Upazila; to the west is Gangni Upazila; to the north are Malipara and Silimpur villages of Khalishakundi Union; and to the south lie the borders of Mirpur Upazila and Gangni Upazila.

== Demographics ==
According to the 2022 Bangladesh census, Khalisakundi had 4,511 households and a population of 16,019. Among them, 7,944 were male and 8,075 were female.

According to the 2011 Bangladesh census, Khalisakundi had 3,900 households and a population of 15,010. Among them, 7,506 were male and 7,504 were female.

== Education ==
According to the 2022 Bangladesh census, the literacy rate in Khalisakundi was 66.24 percent for people aged 7 years and above. The literacy rate among males was 67.74 percent, while among females it was 64.79 percent. Among the educated population, 9,946 received general education, 70 technical education, 66 religious education, and 760 in other fields.

=== Educational institutions ===
- Khalisakundi Degree College – The college was established on 17 September 1994.
- Khalisakundi Secondary School – An MPO-listed secondary school established in 1968 by local residents of Khalisakundi. It received recognition as a secondary school in 1976.
- Khalisakundi Secondary Girls' School – An MPO-listed girls' secondary school established in 1988 and recognized as a secondary school in 1994.
- Prantik Junior Secondary School – A private junior secondary school.
- Khalisakundi Government Primary School

== Economy ==
=== Khalishakundi Tah Haat ===
Khalishakundi Tah Haat is one of the major fresh produce markets in Daulatpur Upazila. The lease value of this market in 2025 was ৳2,602,689.

== Gallery ==
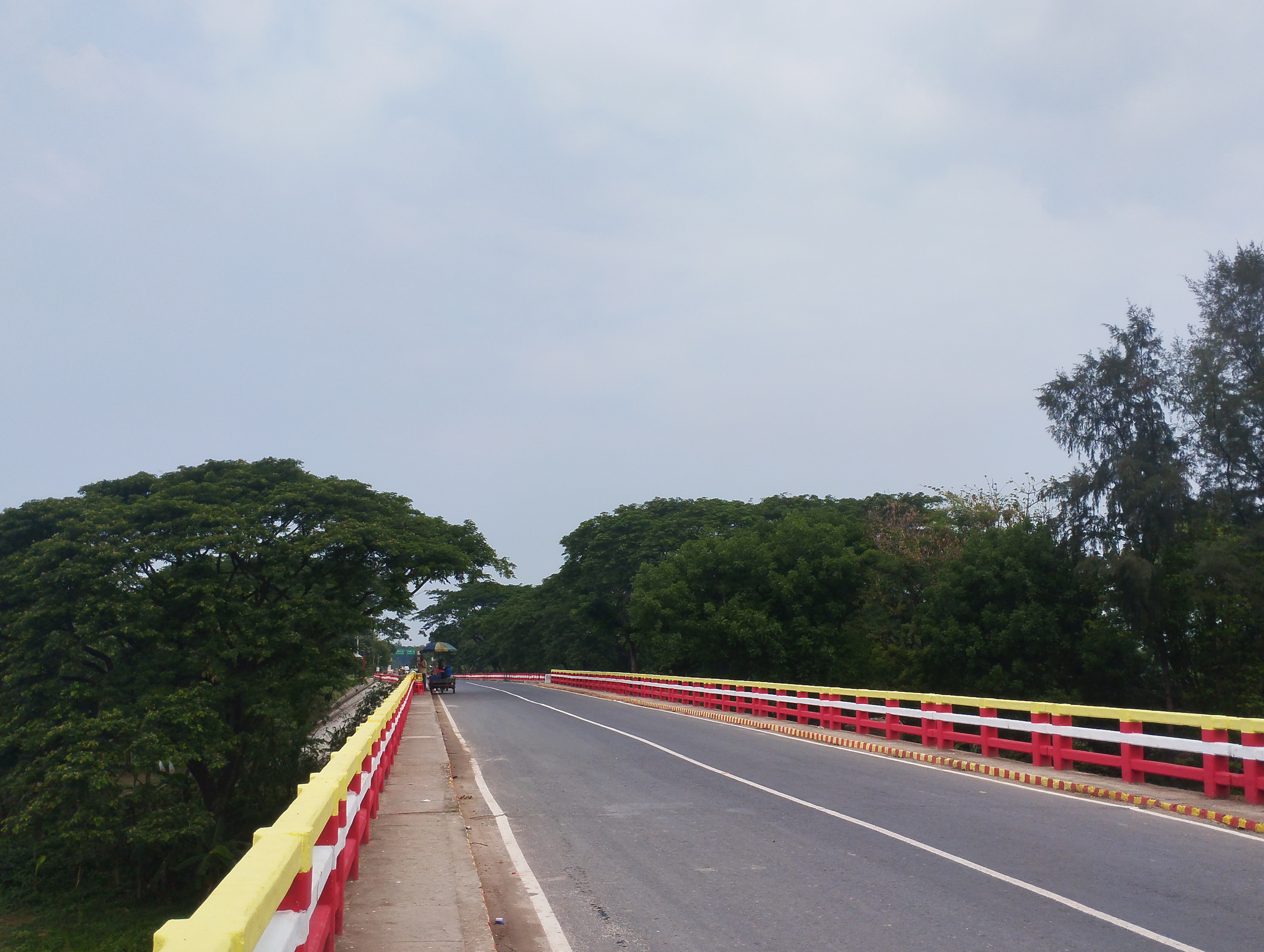
Khalisakundi Bridge

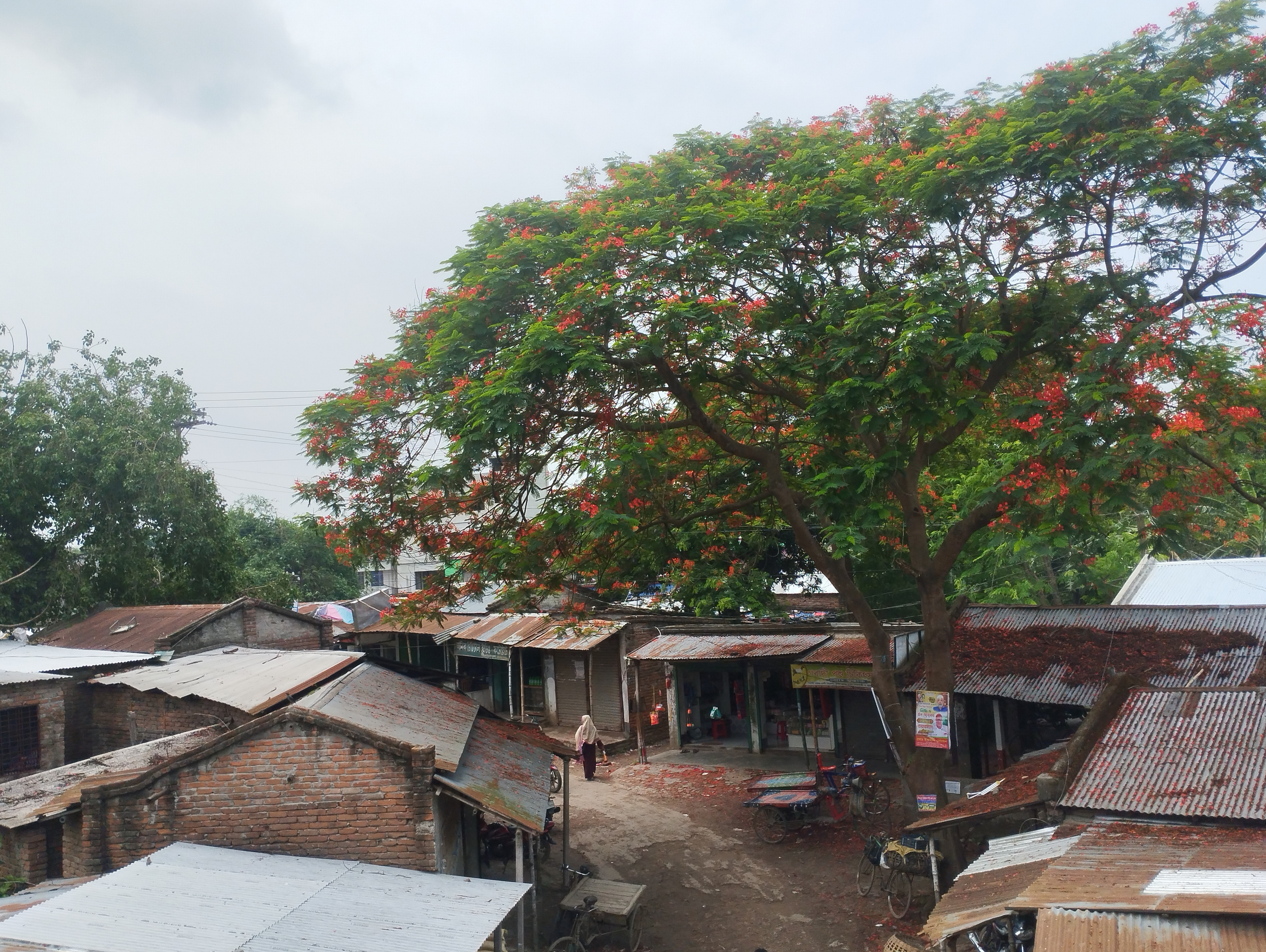
A portion of Khalisakundi Market

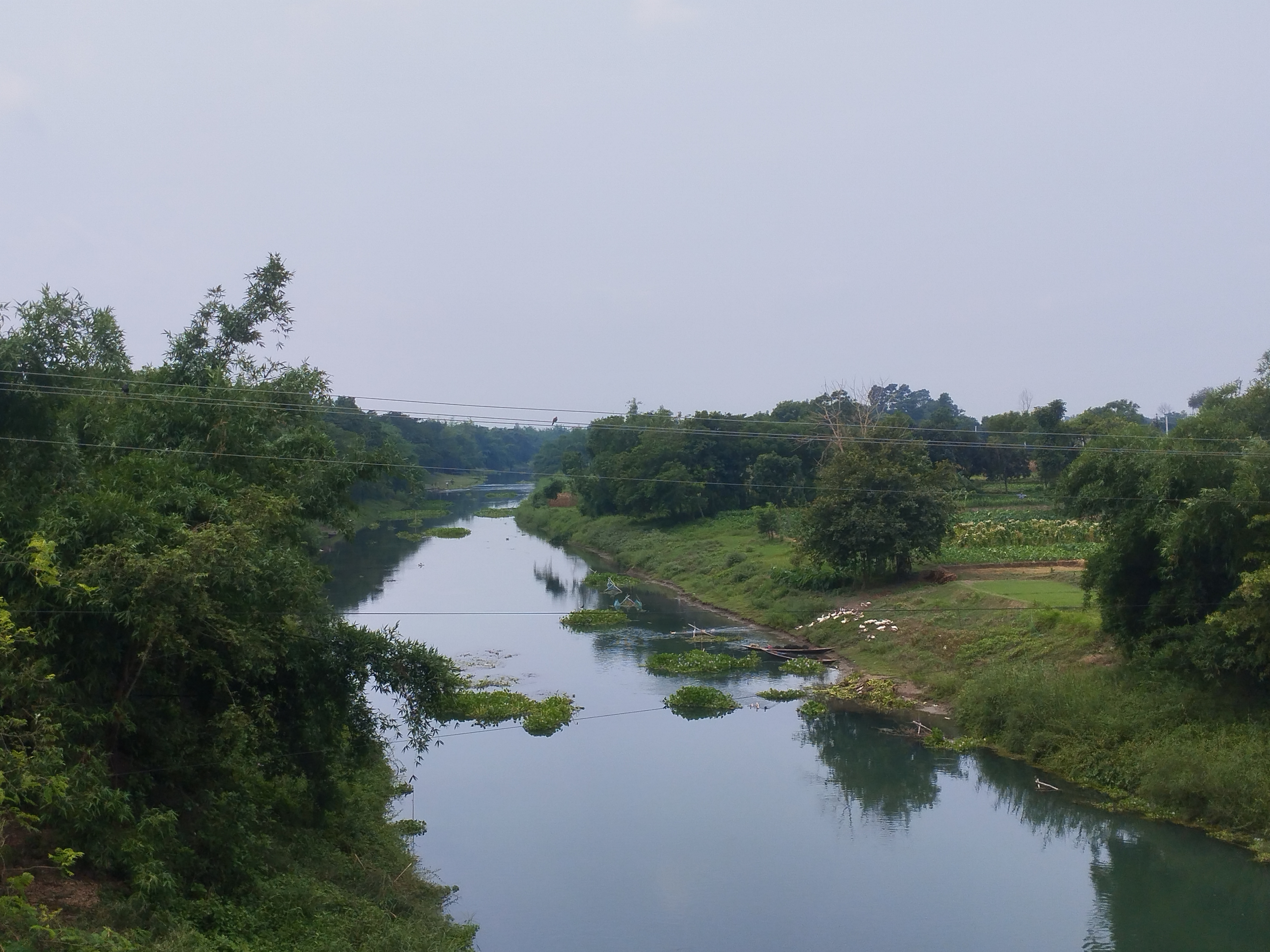
The Mathabhanga River in Khalisakundi
