= Atigram, Mirpur =

Village in Khulna, Bangladesh

Atigram
- Village
- Location within Khulna division Location within Bangladesh
- Coordinates: 23.878177°N 88.987841°E
- Country: Bangladesh
- Division: Khulna
- District: Kushtia
- Upazila: Mirpur Upazila
- Union: Chhatian Union

Area
  - Total: 6.28 km^{2} (2.42 sq mi)

Population (2022)
  - Total: 6,111
  - Density: 973/km^{2} (2,520/sq mi)

Atigram (Bengali: আটিগ্রাম) is a village in Kushtia District. It is located in Chhatian Union of Mirpur Upazila.

== History ==
A gazette published in 1924 shows that Atigram was one of the nine mouzas under the Chhatian Union Board of Mirpur Thana in the Kushtia subdivision of Nadia District.

== Demographics ==
According to the 2022 Bangladesh census, Atigram had 1,564 households and a population of 6,111. Among the population, 2,934 were male and 3,176 were female.

According to the 2011 Bangladesh census, Atigram had 1,359 households and a population of 5,294. Among the population, 2,639 were male and 2,655 were female.

== Education ==
According to the 2022 Bangladesh census, the literacy rate of Atigram was 66.12% for people aged 7 years and above. The literacy rate among males was 64.69%, while among females it was 67.42%. Among the educated population, 3,167 received general education, 18 technical education, 594 religious education, and 14 studied in other educational fields.

=== Educational institutions ===
- Atigram Secondary School (1962)
- Atigram Kabi Dad Ali Government Primary School

Atigram Secondary School was established in 1962 through the initiative of local residents. Due to various difficulties, the school could not obtain approval from the education board at the time of its establishment. Later, under the Jessore Board, it received junior secondary recognition in 1972 and secondary recognition in 1974.

== Religion ==
Religion in Atigram (2022)
1. Islam (99.8%)
2. Hindu (0.17%)

According to the 2022 Bangladesh census, among the 6,111 residents of Atigram, 6,101 were followers of Islam and 10 were followers of Hinduism.

According to the 2011 Bangladesh census, among the 5,294 residents of Atigram, 5,280 were followers of Islam and 14 were followers of Hinduism.

== Economy ==
According to 2022 data, Atigram had a total working-age population of 5,608, of whom 1,729 were employed in various sectors. Among the employed population, 1,547 were male and 182 were female. Of the employed population, 32.74% were engaged in the service sector, 3.76% in industry, and 63.50% in agriculture. Therefore, the economy of the village is primarily agriculture-based.

Atigram has a market or hat known as Atigram Hat or Golabari Hat. In 2026, the government valuation of the market was set at ৳179,957 and the tender price at ৳1,000. In 2025, the government valuation of the market was ৳70,596 and the tender price was ৳500.

== Notable people ==
- Md. Abu Zafor Siddique – Justice of the Supreme Court of Bangladesh

== Bibliography ==
- Daad Ali (1906). ভাঙ্গাপ্রাণ (PDF).
- Daad Ali (1917). শান্তি কুঞ্জ (PDF).
