= Kushtia Main Canal =

- The main canal at Chourhas
- Country: Bangladesh

Specifications
- Length: 62.8 km (39.0 miles)

Geography
- Start point: Gobindagunia, Dhubail Union, Mirpur Upazila, Kushtia District
- End point: Chakdaha, Gayeshpur Union, Sreepur Upazila, Magura District
- Beginning coordinates: 23.956120°N 89.000729°E
- Ending coordinates: 23.662740°N 89.382711°E
- Branch of: Ganges Main Canal (Ganges-Kobadak Irrigation Project)
- Connects to: S12K; S13K; (Note: S13K; Secondary canal no. 13 of Kushtia Canal)

Kushtia Main Canal also known as Kushtia Main Irrigation Canal is one of the three main canals of the Kushtia Unit of the Ganges-Kobadak Irrigation Project. The canal plays an important role in increasing agricultural production, protecting against flooding, and providing drainage in Kushtia, Jhenaidah, and Magura District. Due to the construction of the Farakka Barrage on the Ganges River, the canal can now deliver only about 60% of its designed water capacity.

== History ==
=== Excavation ===
The Ganges-Kobadak (GK) Irrigation Project is a large irrigation scheme that combines pumping and gravity-fed water distribution. In 1953, a team of experts from the Food and Agriculture Organization prepared the project's plans and designs, and the project was approved by the Government of Pakistan in 1954. Although the GK Project originally included the Kushtia, Jessore, and Khulna units, only the proposed engineering works of the Kushtia Unit have been implemented to date. The Kushtia Unit was divided into two phases. Construction of the first phase began in 1954–55, and limited water distribution began in 1962. The first phase was completed in 1969–70.

The Kushtia Main Canal was excavated during the first phase, between 1954 and 1970. It was designed to provide a continuous water supply. According to the 1961 design, the canal had a carrying capacity of 37.11 cubic metres per second (1,311 cu ft/s).

=== Rehabilitation project (1983) ===
The rehabilitation project adopted in 1983 aimed to restore the original carrying capacity of the Kushtia Main Canal and its secondary canals. Under the project, continuous water distribution was discontinued and replaced by rotational water distribution in different sections. The infrastructure required for water measurement and flow control was installed, and institutional improvements were undertaken to support the rotational distribution system.

=== Survey (1988) ===
In the Kharif-2 (Aman) season of 1988, the Department of Water Resources Engineering at Bangladesh University of Engineering and Technology conducted a survey of the Kushtia Main Canal. During the survey, the canal had a carrying capacity of 57.35 cubic metres per second (2,025 cu ft/s). The survey covered the Kushtia Main Canal, three secondary canals representing the head, middle, and tail sections of the main canal, and nine tertiary canals, with three tertiary canals selected from each of the three secondary canals.

Canals selected for the survey
Tertiary canal	S4K	S9K	S11K
Tertiary canals	T3	T9	T18
Tertiary canals	T3	T6	T10
Tertiary canals	T2	T6	T10

== Water source ==
The principal source of water for the Kushtia Main Canal is water pumped from the Padma River at the Bheramara Pump Station. The Kushtia Main Canal branches off from the Ganges Main Canal at Gobindagunia village in Dhubail Union, Mirpur Upazila, approximately 10.6 kilometres (6.6 mi) south of the Bheramara Pump Station.

== Course ==
The Kushtia Main Canal has a total length of 62.8 kilometres (39.0 mi). It originates in Mirpur Upazila and enters Kushtia Sadar Upazila. From Kushtia Sadar Upazila, it enters Kumarkhali Upazila, then passes into Shailkupa Upazila in Jhenaidah District, and terminates in Sreepur Upazila in Magura District. The Gorai Canal is used as a drainage canal for the Kushtia Main Canal.

== Infrastructure ==
The left bank of the Kushtia Main Canal, extending from north to south, serves as a flood-control embankment to protect the project area from inundation caused by rising water levels in the Padma River and the Gorai River.

=== Regulators ===
Regulators are structures constructed at different points along a canal to control water flow. They are operated manually. Including the head regulator at the point of origin (HRK), (Note: HRK; Head regulator of Kushtia Canal) the Kushtia Main Canal has a total of seven regulators. These regulators divide the canal into six sections: R1K, (Note: R1K; Regulator No. 1 of Kushtia Canal) R2K, R3K, R4K, R5K, and R6K.

=== Branch canals ===
The Kushtia Main Canal has two types of branch canals:

1. Secondary canals
2. Tertiary canals

==== Secondary canals ====
The Kushtia Main Canal has a total of 15 secondary canals. These canals originate from the main canal, and their control structures (regulators) are located no more than 4 kilometres (2.5 mi) downstream from their respective points of origin. The secondary canals range in length from 4.6 kilometres (2.9 mi) to 26 kilometres (16 mi).

==== Tertiary canals ====
Tertiary canals originate from both the main canal and the secondary canals. A regulator is located at the point of origin of each tertiary canal, and the project authority exercises no direct control over the canal beyond that point.

== Management ==
Overall responsibility for the operation and maintenance of the Kushtia Main Canal rests with the project director or the supervising engineer.

== Problems ==
=== Construction of embankments ===
Embankments were constructed across the Kaliganga and Dakua rivers to maintain the flow of the Kushtia Main Canal. As a result, the Kaliganga River and the Dakua River became disconnected from their source, the Gorai River. (Note: The left bank of the Kushtia Main Canal primarily serves as a flood-control embankment against flooding originating from the Gorai River.) Consequently, downstream water flow in the Kaliganga and Dakua rivers becomes extremely limited during the dry season. During the monsoon season, their water flow depends largely on seasonal rainfall.

== Gallery ==
The Kushtia Main Canal at Mollateghoria

A siphon bridge constructed to carry a branch canal of the Ganges Main Canal. The Kushtia Main Canal passes over it.

A regulator on the Kushtia Main Canal

The Dakua River, photographed from the embankment of the Kushtia Main Canal
