= Mirpur, Kushtia =

City and Upazila headquarter of Mirpur Upazila

Mirpur মিরপুর
- City & Municipality
- Location within Khulna division Location within Bangladesh
- Coordinates: 23°56′18″N 88°59′55″E
- Division: Khulna
- District: Kushtia
- Upazila: Mirpur

Government
  - Mayor: Haji Md. Enamul Haque

Area
  - Urban: 9.22 km^{2} (3.56 sq mi)

Population
  - Urban: 22,417
  - Urban density: 2,430/km^{2} (6,300/sq mi)
- Time zone: UTC+6
- Postal code: 7030
- Website: pourashava.mirpur.kushtia.gov.bd

Mirpur (Bengali: মিরপুর) is the town and administrative capital of Mirpur Upazila. Mirpur has a special reputation for tobacco production in Kushtia District. The town has nine Wards and 15 Mahallas. It has a population of 22,417. It is 9.22 square kilometer in area and has a 56 percent literacy rate.

== History ==
No exact information is available regarding the naming of Mirpur. However, the city of Mirpur was built around the infamous Nilkar Taylor and Knudson's Nilkuti. Mirpur Police Station and Mirpur Tahsil Office were established in 1820-1824 centered around Nilkuti. When Pabna District was formed in 1828, a police camp was established 1 mile east of Mirpur. In 1863, the A-region along with Mirpur was included in the Kushtia subdivision and was added to the Nadia district. Mirpur railway station was established in 1878 and Mirpur became a center of trade and commerce around it.

== Government ==
The chairman of Mirpur Municipality, Saiful Haq Khan Choudhury alias Faruk Choudhury, was detained by Bangladesh Police in February 2007. Construction companies owned by relatives of Shahidul Islam, member of parliament, constructed a number of important buildings in the area including Mirpur Municipality townhall. The Daily Star reported the contracts were given through improper consideration and corruption.

In October 2011, Mayor Saiful Haq Khan Choudhury was sued by the Anti-Corruption Commission.

In January 2021, Bangladesh Election Commission launched an investigation on a voting centre for the Mirpur municipality election which had an unusual 100 percent turnout.

There is a Mirpur Municipal Crematorium for Hindu families.

== Education ==
=== College ===
- Amla Government College
- Mirpur Women's Degree College
- Border Guard Public School and College

=== Secondary school ===
- Mirpur Government Girls High School
- Amla Sadarpur Secondary School
- Mirpur Pilot High School

== Popular places ==
- Amla Farm
- BGB park
- Mirpur Railway Bridge
