= Amla =

Amla may refer to:

- Amla (fruit) and (tree), another name for Indian gooseberry or emblic myrobalan
- Hashim Amla (born 1983), South African cricketer of Indian descent
- Ahmed Amla (born 1979), South African cricketer and brother of Hashim
- Amla, Madhya Pradesh, a town in Madhya Pradesh, India
- Amla (Vidhan Sabha constituency), Madhya Pradesh
- Amla, Mirpur, A village and market in Kushtia District, Bangladesh

== See also ==
- AMLA (disambiguation)
- Amala (disambiguation)
- Aonla (disambiguation)
- Amlah, Oman
