= Kursha K.N. Secondary School =

Kursha K.N. secondary school

Location
- Kursha, Kursha Union, Mirpur Upazila; Bangladesh
- Coordinates: 23.8400°N 88.9409°E

Information
- Other name: Kursha Kedar Nath Secondary School
- Former name: Kursha K.N. Bahumukhi High School
- School type: MPO Secondary school
- Established: 1889; 137 years ago
- Founder: কেদার নাথ জোয়ার্দার
- Status: সক্রিয়
- School board: Board of Intermediate and Secondary Education, Jashore
- School district: Kushtia District
- School number: 117830 (EIIN)
- Classes: 6th-10th
- Language: Bengali
- Area: 3 acres (12,000 m^{2})
- Campus type: Rural
- Website: kurshaknsecondaryschool.jessoreboard.gov.bd

Kursha K.N. Secondary School (Bengali: কুর্শা কে.এন. মাধ্যমিক বিদ্যালয়) (previous name: Kursha K.N. Bahumukhi High School (Bengali: কুর্শা কে.এন. বহুমুখী উচ্চ বিদ্যালয়)) is a secondary school under Board of Intermediate and Secondary Education, Jashore located in Kursha of Kursha Union of Mirpur Upazila of Kushtia District. The school was established in 1889 by Kedar Nath Jowardar, a local Hindu zamindar. The school is also known as Kursha Kedar Nath Secondary School (Bengali: কুর্শা কেদার নাথ মাধ্যমিক বিদ্যালয়).

== History ==
In 1889 local Hindu zamindar Kedar Nath Joardar established the school on about 10 acres (40,000 m^{2}) of land. The school is named after its founder.

=== British period ===
It was started in 1889 as an ME (English Medium) school for classes 1–7. Kedar Nath Joardar 's son Harinath Joardar served as the first headmaster of the school . In 1939, Kumar Dutta served as the second head teacher.

=== Pakistan period ===
The school was closed in 1956 due to communal riots when Kumar Dutta was the headmaster after the partition of the Indian subcontinent.

=== Post-independence period ===
After closing down in 1956, the school reopened in 1983 after 28 years. Then Sabdar Hossain took charge as the head teacher. Later, Zahir Uddin became the head teacher. After his retirement, Nurunnabi served as the head teacher since 2011.

The school was initially established on 10 acres (40,000 m^{2}) of land but now the land is 3 acres (12,000 m^{2}). The rest of the land has gone to the possession of some influential local people.

== Location ==
The school is located in Kursha village adjacent to Majihat village in Kursha Union of Mirpur Upazila of Kushtia District . The distance of the school from Mirpur Upazila city is 17 km and the distance of the school from Kushtia city is 25 km.

== Educational activities ==
The school is under Board of Intermediate and Secondary Education, Jashore.
