= AMLA =

AMLA may refer to:

- Anti-Money Laundering Authority, an agency of the European Union
- Latin American Musicians Association (Spanish: Asociación de Músicos Latino Americanos)
- American Mutual Life Association, a Slovenian-American fraternal organization
- Administration of Muslim Law Act, an act of the Parliament of Singapore
- Anti-Money Laundering Act (Switzerland), a piece of Swiss legislation
- Anti-Money Laundering Act of 2001, a law of the Philippines
- Amla Junction railway station, the code for the railway station

== See also ==
- Amla (disambiguation)
