= Poradaha Fair =

Folk festival of Bogura

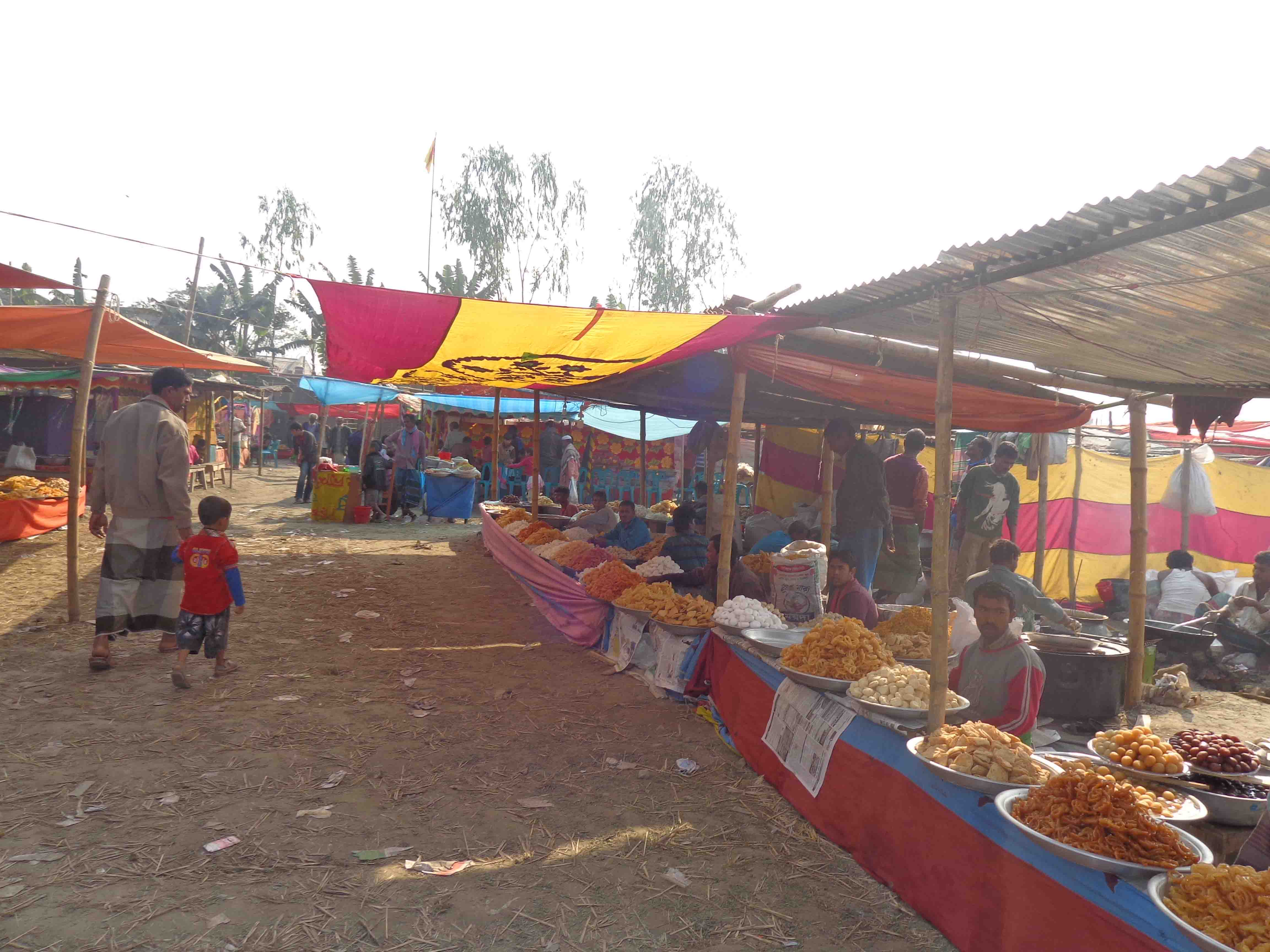

Poradaha Fair is an annual folk fair held on the banks of the Ichamati River in Poradah, a Bangladeshi town 11 kilometers east of Bogra. It is believed that the fair began nearly 400 years ago. Although the religious rituals and celebrations are primarily part of the Hindu community’s traditions, the fair transcends religious boundaries. The fair draws thousands each year.

== History ==
The Poradah Fair, often referred to as the Historic Poradah Fair, has no recorded date marking its exact inception. But it is said that around four hundred years ago, at the very site where the fair is now held, there stood a large banyan tree. One day, a monk suddenly appeared there. Over time, more monks began arriving in groups and eventually established an ashram at that spot. For the local Hindu community, the place became a sacred site. Every year, on the Wednesday closest to the last day of the Bengali month of Magh—either the day before or the day after the last day—the Hindu community would organize a monk-worship ceremony there. Devotees from far and wide would come together on that specific day each year. As time passed, the number of visitors steadily increased. Gradually, a village fair began to form around the day of worship. Though the monks eventually left the site, the ritual of monk worship continued. Over time, the fair gained greater recognition and people started coming from distant places to witness it. The sannyasi tradition is still observed to this day.

== Names ==
Since the fair originally began on the occasion of the monk worship ceremony, it was initially called the Sannyasi Mela (Monk Fair). Due to its location, over time people began referring to it as Poradah-er Mela (the Fair of Poradah); eventually, the name became widely known and established simply as the Poradah Mela.

During the fair, many married daughters from surrounding villages return to their parental homes with their husbands; for this reason, some people also refer to it as the Jamai Mela (Son-in-law Fair). It has also been referred to as a Fish Fair, due to the large quantities of fish available at the fair, calling it a Fish Fair.

== Duration of the fair ==
The fair is held annually on the Wednesday that falls within the last three days of the Bengali month of Magh. Although the fair is officially a one-day event, locally, the celebration continues for a week. During the fair, relatives gather at every household.

On the day following the main fair, Thursday, smaller fairs called Bou Mela (Women's Fair) take place at the same location and in nearby villages. While the main fair is organized under government supervision, the Bou Mela is arranged by the local villagers themselves. It is especially intended for those women in the villages who, due to work pressures or social conservatism, cannot attend the main fair. One of the special features of the Bou Mela is that both married women (with their husbands) and unmarried girls are allowed to enter and shop freely.
