= Baruipara Union, Mirpur =

Baruipara Union বারুইপাড়া ইউনিয়ন
- Union
- Baruipara Union
- Location within Bangladesh
- Coordinates: 23.9285°N 89.0465°E
- Country: Bangladesh
- Division: Khulna
- District: Kushtia
- Upazila: Mirpur

Area
  - Total: 74.88 km^{2} (28.91 sq mi)

Population (2011)
  - Total: 28,104
  - Density: 375.3/km^{2} (972.1/sq mi)
- Time zone: UTC+6 (BST)
- Website: baruiparaup.kushtia.gov.bd

Baruipara Union (Bengali: বারুইপাড়া ইউনিয়ন) is a union parishad of Mirpur Upazila, in Kushtia District, Khulna Division of Bangladesh. The union has an area of 74.88 square kilometres (28.91 sq mi) and as of 2001 had a population of 28,104. There are 7 villages and 5 mouzas in the union.
