= Amla Government College =

Government college in Bangladesh

Amla Government College আমলা সরকারি কলেজ
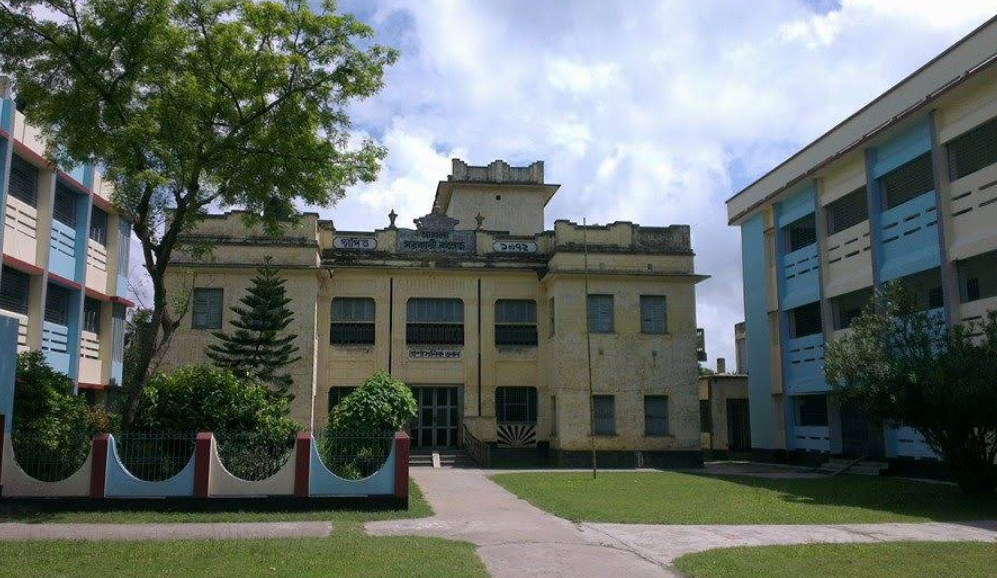
- Type: Government College
- Established: July 1, 1972; 54 years ago
- Founder: Shohid Marfat Ali
- Affiliations: National University, Bangladesh
- Principal: Md Badshah Jahangir
- Students: 1200 (approx)
- Location: Amla, Amla Union, Mirpur Upazila , Kushtia District, Bangladesh; 23.9059423°N 88.9310559°E
- Language: Bangla
- Website: www.amlacollege.gov.bd
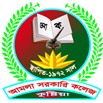

Amla Government College (Bengali: আমলা সরকারি কলেজ) is a traditional government college in Mirpur Upazila of Kushtia District. The college is located in Amla Union of Mirpur Upazila.

== History ==
Amla Government College was established on 01 July 1972. Later on 3 November 1987 the college was nationalized. Local leader Marfat Ali established the college on 6.3 acres of land with the aim of spreading education in his area.

== Infrastructure ==
Amla Government College has two storied administration building, three storied science building, one storied arts and three storied degree building. Provision of a residential hostel for students.

== Departments ==
Amla Government College Higher Secondary level has 03 departments under Jessore Board. 02 Graduate (Honours) courses are running under the National University.

HSC

- Science
- Arts
- Commerce

Graduate

- BA
- BSS

== Gallery ==
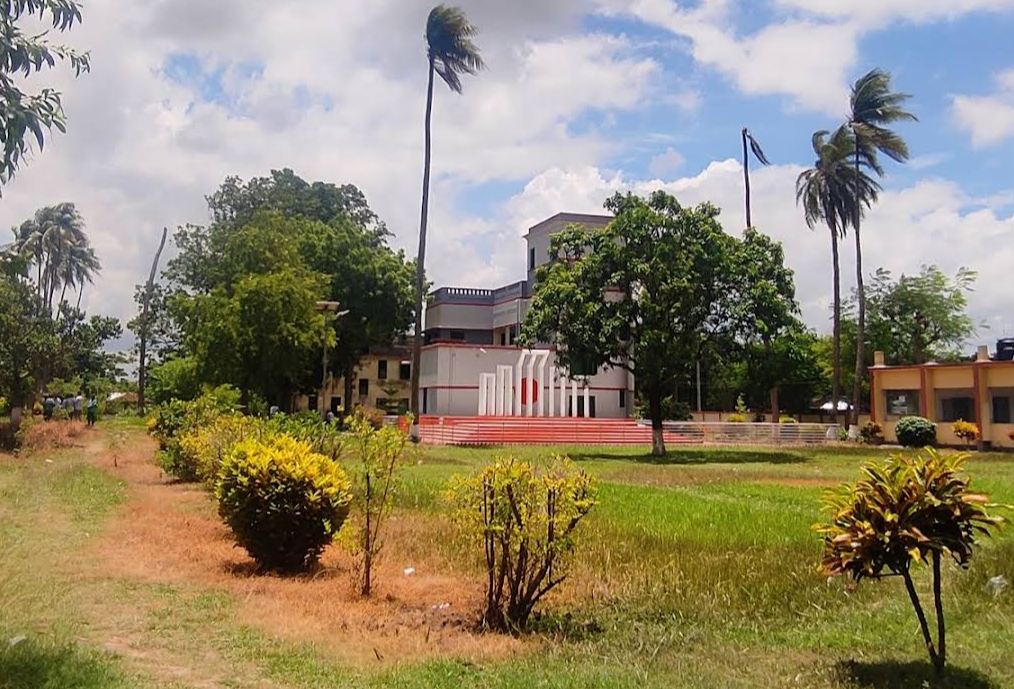

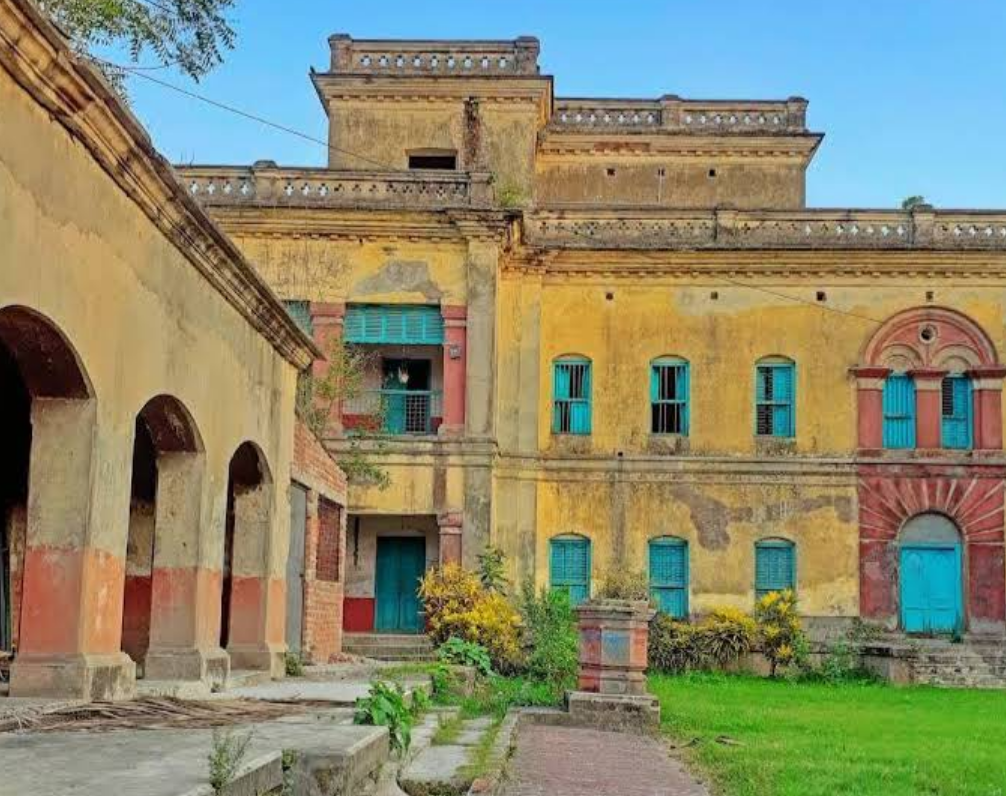

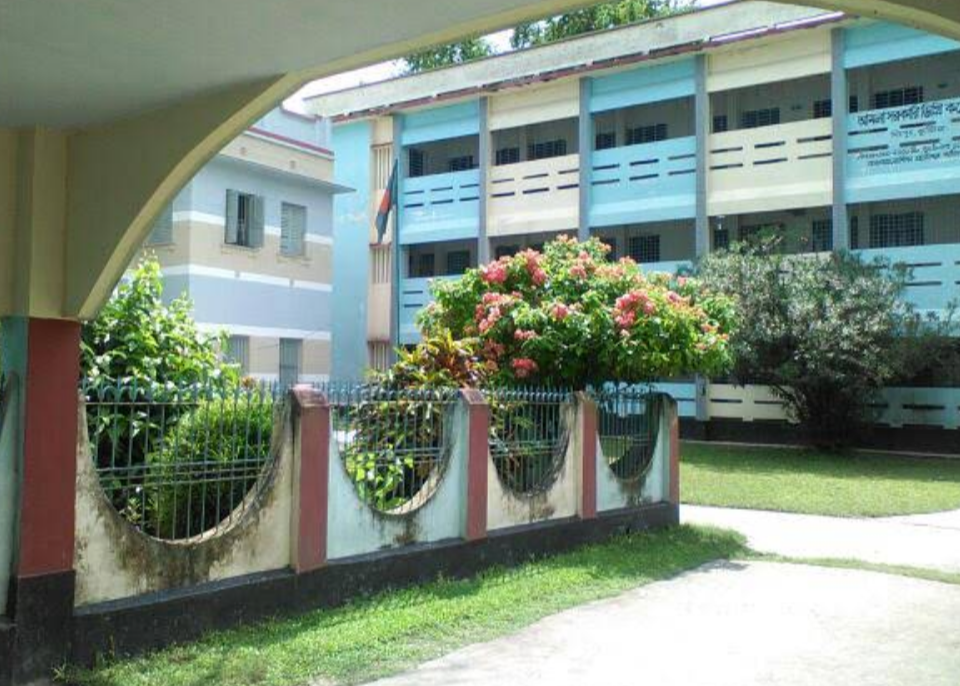

== External ==
- College Website
- Media related to Amla Government College at Wikimedia Commons
