= Kursha Union =

Kursha Union কুর্শা ইউনিয়ন
- Union
- Kursha Union
- Location within Bangladesh
- Coordinates: 23.8277°N 88.9542°E
- Country: Bangladesh
- Division: Khulna
- District: Kushtia
- Upazila: Mirpur

Area
  - Total: 25.38 km^{2} (9.80 sq mi)

Population (2011)
  - Total: 30,000
  - Density: 1,200/km^{2} (3,100/sq mi)
- Time zone: UTC+6 (BST)
- Website: kurshaup.kushtia.gov.bd

Kursha Union (Bengali: কুর্শা ইউনিয়ন) is a union parishad of Mirpur Upazila, in Kushtia District, Khulna Division of Bangladesh. The union has an area of 25.38 square kilometres (9.80 sq mi) and as of 2001 had a population of 30,000. There are 18 villages and 14 mouzas in the union.

There are three secondary schools in the union parishad: K.H.N. Secondary School, Kursha K.N. Secondary School, and Majihat Secondary School.
