= Talbaria Union =

Talbaria Union তালবাড়ীয়া ইউনিয়ন
- Union
- Talbaria Union
- Location within Bangladesh
- Coordinates: 23.9591°N 89.0750°E
- Country: Bangladesh
- Division: Khulna
- District: Kushtia
- Upazila: Mirpur

Area
  - Total: 42.11 km^{2} (16.26 sq mi)

Population (2011)
  - Total: 20,172
  - Density: 479.0/km^{2} (1,241/sq mi)
- Time zone: UTC+6 (BST)
- Website: talbariaup.kushtia.gov.bd

Talbaria Union (Bengali: তালবাড়ীয়া ইউনিয়ন) is a union parishad situated at Mirpur Upazila, in Kushtia District, Khulna Division of Bangladesh. The union has an area of 42.11 square kilometres (16.26 sq mi) and as of 2001 had a population of 20,172. There are 18 villages and 14 mouzas in the union.
