= Khalishakundi Union =

Khalishakundi Union খলিষাকুন্ডি ইউনিয়ন
- Union
- Khalishakundi Union
- Country: Bangladesh
- Division: Khulna
- District: Kushtia
- Upazila: Daulatpur

Area
  - Total: 43.03 km^{2} (16.61 sq mi)

Population (2011)
  - Total: 43,000
  - Density: 1,000/km^{2} (2,600/sq mi)
- Time zone: UTC+6 (BST)
- Website: khalishakundiup.kushtia.gov.bd

Khalishakundi Union (Bengali: খলিষাকুন্ডি ইউনিয়ন) is a union parishad situated at Daulatpur Upazila, in Kushtia District, Khulna Division of Bangladesh. Its headquarters are located in Khalishakundi. The union has an area of 44.03 square kilometres (17.00 sq mi) and as of 2001 had a population of 43,000. There are 17 villages and 11 mouzas in the union.
