= Aonla =

Aonla may refer to:

- Indian gooseberry (Phyllanthus emblica), a deciduous tree of the family Phyllanthaceae
- Amala, Nepal
- Aonla, Uttar Pradesh, a place in Uttar Pradesh, India
- Aonla (Assembly constituency)
- Aonla (Lok Sabha constituency)

== See also ==
- Amala (disambiguation)
- Amla (disambiguation)
