= Bahalbaria Union =

Bahalbaria Union বহলবাড়ীয়া ইউনিয়ন
- Union
- Ambaria Union
- Location within Bangladesh
- Coordinates: 23.9808°N 89.0168°E
- Country: Bangladesh
- Division: Khulna
- District: Kushtia
- Upazila: Mirpur

Area
  - Total: 46.17 km^{2} (17.83 sq mi)

Population (2011)
  - Total: 26,032
  - Density: 563.8/km^{2} (1,460/sq mi)
- Time zone: UTC+6 (BST)
- Website: bahalbariaup.kushtia.gov.bd

Bahalbaria Union (Bengali: বহলবাড়ীয়া ইউনিয়ন) is a union parishad of Mirpur Upazila, in Kushtia District, Khulna Division of Bangladesh. The union has an area of 46.17 square kilometres (17.83 sq mi) and as of 2001 had a population of 26,032. There are 7 villages and 5 mouzas in the union.
