= Chithalia Union =

Chithalia Union চিথলিয়া ইউনিয়ন
- Union
- Chithalia Union
- Location within Bangladesh
- Coordinates: 23.9499°N 88.9555°E
- Country: Bangladesh
- Division: Khulna
- District: Kushtia
- Upazila: Mirpur

Area
  - Total: 82.88 km^{2} (32.00 sq mi)

Population (2011)
  - Total: 27,737
  - Density: 334.7/km^{2} (866.8/sq mi)
- Time zone: UTC+6 (BST)
- Website: chithaliaup.kushtia.gov.bd

Chithalia Union (Bengali: চিথলিয়া ইউনিয়ন) is a union parishad of Mirpur Upazila, in Kushtia District, Khulna Division of Bangladesh. The union has an area of 82.88 square kilometres (32.00 sq mi) and as of 2001 had a population of 16,287. There are 7 villages and 5 mouzas in the union.
