= Malihad Union =

Malihad Union মালিহাদ ইউনিয়ন
- Union
- Malihad Union
- Location within Bangladesh
- Coordinates: 23.8360°N 88.9144°E
- Country: Bangladesh
- Division: Khulna
- District: Kushtia
- Upazila: Mirpur

Area
  - Total: 75.81 km^{2} (29.27 sq mi)

Population (2011)
  - Total: 24,751
  - Density: 326.5/km^{2} (845.6/sq mi)
- Time zone: UTC+6 (BST)
- Website: 11nomalihadup.kushtia.gov.bd

Ambaria Union (Bengali: মালিহাদ ইউনিয়ন) is a union parishad of Mirpur Upazila, in Kushtia District, Khulna Division of Bangladesh. The union has an area of 75.81 square kilometres (29.27 sq mi) and as of 2001 had a population of 24,751. There are 20 villages and 15 mouzas in the union.
