= Fulbaria Union =

Fulbaria Union ফুলবাড়ীয়া ইউনিয়ন
- Union
- Fulbaria Union
- Location within Bangladesh
- Country: Bangladesh
- Division: Khulna
- District: Kushtia
- Upazila: Mirpur

Area
  - Total: 38.02 km^{2} (14.68 sq mi)

Population (2011)
  - Total: 24,325
  - Density: 639.8/km^{2} (1,657/sq mi)
- Time zone: UTC+6 (BST)
- Website: fulbariaup.kushtia.gov.bd

Fulbaria Union (Bengali: ফুলবাড়ীয়া ইউনিয়ন) is a union parishad situated at Mirpur Upazila, in Kushtia District, Khulna Division of Bangladesh. The union has an area of 38.02 square kilometres (14.68 sq mi) and as of 2001 had a population of 24,325. There are 11 villages and 6 mouzas in the union.
