= Anti-Money Laundering Act of 2001 =

Philippine law against money laundering

12th Congress of the Philippines
- Long title: An Act Defining the Crime of Money Laundering, Providing Penalties Therefor and for Other Purposes
- Citation: Republic Act No. 9160
- Territorial extent: Philippines
- Enacted by: House of Representatives of the Philippines
- Enacted: September 29, 2001
- Enacted by: Senate of the Philippines
- Enacted: September 29, 2001
- Signed by: President Gloria Macapagal Arroyo
- Signed: September 29, 2001
- Administered by: Anti–Money Laundering Council

Amended by
- Republic Acts Nos. 9194, 10167, 10365, 10927 and 11521

Text of statute as originally enacted
- Status: In force

The Anti-Money Laundering Act of 2001 (AMLA), officially designated as Republic Act No. 9160, is a law of the Philippines that defines and penalizes money laundering and establishes measures for preventing, detecting and prosecuting the offense. It was signed by President Gloria Macapagal Arroyo on September 29, 2001.

The act created the Anti–Money Laundering Council (AMLC), which serves as the country's financial intelligence unit, and imposed customer-identification, record-keeping and transaction-reporting duties on regulated institutions. Its scope and enforcement mechanisms have subsequently been expanded by Republic Acts Nos. 9194, 10167, 10365, 10927 and 11521.

== Background and enactment ==
The Financial Action Task Force (FATF) identified the Philippines as a non-cooperative country or territory in 2000. Political scientist Bing Baltazar C. Brillo described the enactment of Republic Act No. 9160 and its first amendment as being largely driven by external pressure to meet FATF standards, avoid countermeasures and secure removal from the FATF list.

Congress passed the measure as a consolidation of House Bill No. 3083 and Senate Bill No. 1745, and Arroyo approved it on September 29, 2001. The original act declared a policy of protecting the integrity and confidentiality of bank accounts while preventing the country from being used to launder proceeds of unlawful activity. It also provided for international cooperation in transnational money-laundering investigations and prosecutions.

Republic Act No. 9194, enacted in 2003, revised the law's reporting threshold, introduced the concept of suspicious transactions regardless of amount and transferred authority to issue freeze orders from the AMLC to the Court of Appeals. In February 2005, the FATF removed the Philippines from its list of non-cooperative countries and territories after the enactment and substantial implementation of anti-money-laundering reforms.

== Principal provisions ==
=== Offense and predicate crimes ===
As amended, the act applies when a person knows that a monetary instrument or property represents, involves or relates to the proceeds of an enumerated unlawful activity. Prohibited conduct includes transacting, converting, transferring, moving, acquiring, possessing, using, concealing or disguising such property, as well as attempting, conspiring, aiding, abetting or facilitating those acts. A covered person who knowingly fails to file a required covered- or suspicious-transaction report may also commit money laundering.

The statute uses the term unlawful activity for its predicate offenses. The list has been expanded over time and includes specified offenses relating to kidnapping for ransom, illegal drugs, graft, plunder, robbery, smuggling, terrorism and terrorism financing, trafficking in persons, environmental and intellectual-property laws, securities fraud and comparable offenses punishable under foreign law. Republic Act No. 11521 added specified violations of the Strategic Trade Management Act and certain tax crimes, subject to statutory thresholds and conditions.

=== Covered persons and reporting ===
Covered persons include institutions regulated by the Bangko Sentral ng Pilipinas, the Insurance Commission and the Securities and Exchange Commission, as well as specified dealers in precious metals and stones, company-service providers and professionals conducting designated financial activities for clients. Later amendments added casinos, real-estate developers and brokers, and offshore gaming operators and their service providers to the statutory list.

In general, a cash transaction exceeding ₱500,000 within one banking day is a covered transaction. The act sets separate thresholds of more than ₱5 million for a single casino cash transaction and more than ₱7.5 million for a single cash transaction involving a covered real-estate developer or broker. A suspicious transaction is reportable regardless of amount when one or more statutory indicators are present, such as lack of an identifiable lawful purpose, failure to identify the client, an amount inconsistent with the client's financial capacity, apparent structuring to evade reporting, or a connection to an unlawful activity.

The act requires covered persons to identify their customers, retain transaction and account records, and report covered and suspicious transactions to the AMLC. It also prohibits disclosure that a report has been made, while protecting good-faith reporting from administrative, civil and criminal proceedings.

=== Anti-Money Laundering Council and court orders ===
The AMLC is composed of the governor of the Bangko Sentral ng Pilipinas as chair, and the heads of the Insurance Commission and Securities and Exchange Commission as members. The council acts unanimously. Its functions include receiving reports, conducting investigations, initiating civil-forfeiture proceedings, referring complaints for prosecution, responding to foreign requests for assistance and imposing administrative sanctions.

Upon a verified ex parte petition by the AMLC and a judicial finding of probable cause, the Court of Appeals may issue a freeze order that takes immediate effect for 20 days. A summary hearing must be held within that period, and the total duration of a Court of Appeals freeze order generally may not exceed six months. The law also permits the AMLC to seek search-and-seizure and subpoena orders from competent courts and to implement targeted financial sanctions connected with the financing of weapons-of-mass-destruction proliferation.

Regional trial courts generally have jurisdiction over criminal money-laundering cases. Cases involving public officers and private persons accused of conspiring with them fall within the jurisdiction of the Sandiganbayan.

== Amendments ==
Principal amendments to Republic Act No. 9160
| Year | Law | Main changes |
|---|---|---|
| 2003 | Republic Act No. 9194 | Lowered the general covered-transaction threshold to more than ₱500,000 in one banking day; established suspicious-transaction reporting regardless of amount; expanded AMLC powers; and placed the issuance of freeze orders with the Court of Appeals. |
| 2012 | Republic Act No. 10167 | Revised procedures for freeze orders and expressly authorized the AMLC to apply ex parte for court orders permitting inquiry into bank deposits and investments. |
| 2013 | Republic Act No. 10365 | Expanded the classes of covered persons and predicate offenses, broadened the acts constituting money laundering and provided that a money-laundering prosecution may proceed independently of proceedings concerning the predicate offense. |
| 2017 | Republic Act No. 10927 | Designated casinos, including internet- and ship-based casinos, as covered persons for gaming-related cash transactions and set a ₱5 million reporting threshold for a single casino cash transaction. |
| 2021 | Republic Act No. 11521 | Added real-estate developers and brokers, offshore gaming operators and service providers as covered persons; added specified tax and strategic-trade offenses; strengthened AMLC investigative and asset-management powers; and revised freeze-order and targeted-financial-sanctions provisions. |

== Judicial interpretation ==
In Republic v. Eugenio Jr. (2008), the Supreme Court of the Philippines held that the version of section 11 then in force did not generally authorize ex parte bank-inquiry orders. The court reasoned that account holders were entitled to notice and an opportunity to contest probable cause, and distinguished a bank-inquiry order from a search warrant. Republic Act No. 10167 later expressly allowed the AMLC to seek bank-inquiry orders ex parte.

In Ligot v. Republic (2013), the Supreme Court characterized a freeze order as an extraordinary and interim remedy intended to preserve assets suspected of being connected with unlawful activity. It held that the probable-cause inquiry concerns the relationship between the property and an unlawful activity, rather than requiring a prior criminal charge or conviction. The court also held that a freeze order could not be extended indefinitely because of due-process concerns.

== FATF monitoring ==
The Philippines was again placed under FATF increased monitoring in June 2021. The FATF identified deficiencies in the wider national anti-money-laundering and counter-terrorist-financing system, including risks associated with casino junkets and the investigation and prosecution of terrorism-financing cases.

On February 21, 2025, the FATF removed the Philippines from increased monitoring after finding significant progress on the country's action plan. The FATF nevertheless called on the Philippines to sustain improvements through continued work with the Asia/Pacific Group on Money Laundering.

== See also ==
- Anti–Money Laundering Council
- Bank secrecy
- Financial Action Task Force blacklist
- Money laundering
- List of Philippine laws
