= Amala Nagar =

- village
- Location in Kerala, India Amala Nagar (India)
- Coordinates: 10.56200°N 76.16892°E
- Country: India
- State: Kerala
- District: Thrissur

Government
  - Body: Adat Grama Panchayath, Kaipparambu Grama Panchayath

Languages
  - Official: Malayalam, English
- Time zone: UTC+5:30 (IST)
- Vehicle registration: KL-8

Amala Nagar is an Indian village in the Thrissur district of Kerala. It has Amala Institute of Medical Sciences, one of medical colleges of Thrissur district (And after which the place itself is named). It is on the State Highway 69, which extends up to Kuttippuram. This place was earlier known as Vilangan, a name it got from the nearby hill Vilangan Kunnu. The place is surrounded by various temples, church and a Mosque as well as various central and state syllabus school. The Sreeramakrishna Ashram and Sarada Vidhyapeeth are nearby. Shreeramakrish Ashram runs school for boys and Sarada Vidyapeeth runs school for girls. Both are very good schools. Sobha city mall is about 4 km from Amala Nagar.
