= Dhubail Union =

Dhubail Union ধুবইল ইউনিয়ন
- Union
- Location within Bangladesh
- Coordinates: 23.9653°N 88.9833°E
- Country: Bangladesh
- Division: Khulna
- District: Kushtia
- Upazila: Mirpur

Area
  - Total: 25.38 km^{2} (9.80 sq mi)

Population (2011)
  - Total: 27,737
  - Density: 1,093/km^{2} (2,831/sq mi)
- Time zone: UTC+6 (BST)
- Website: dhubailup.kushtia.gov.bd

Dhubail Union (Bengali: ধুবইল ইউনিয়ন) is a union parishad situated at Mirpur Upazila, in Kushtia District, Khulna Division of Bangladesh. The union has an area of 25.38 square kilometres (9.80 sq mi) and as of 2001 had a population of 15,178. There are 11 villages and 9 mouzas in the union.
