= Chhatian Union =

Chhatian Union ছাতিয়ান ইউনিয়ন
- Union
- Chhatian Union
- Location within Bangladesh
- Coordinates: 23.8849°N 88.9960°E
- Country: Bangladesh
- Division: Khulna
- District: Kushtia
- Upazila: Mirpur

Area
  - Total: 32.00 km^{2} (12.36 sq mi)

Population (2011)
  - Total: 34,326
  - Density: 1,073/km^{2} (2,778/sq mi)
- Time zone: UTC+6 (BST)
- Website: chhatianup.kushtia.gov.bd

Chhatian Union (Bengali: ছাতিয়ান ইউনিয়ন) is a union parishad of Mirpur Upazila, in Kushtia District, Khulna Division of Bangladesh. The union has an area of 32.00 square kilometres (12.36 sq mi) and as of 2001 had a population of 34,326. There are 18 villages and 14 mouzas in the union.
