= Ganges-Kobadak Irrigation Project =

Ganges-Kobadak Project G-K Project

Location
- Countries: Bangladesh
- Location: Bheramara, Kushtia
- Area Served: Kushtia, Chuadanga, Magura, Jhenaidah District

Physical characteristics
- Source
  - location: Ganges
- Mouth
  - location: Kapotaksh
- Length: 193 km (120 mi)

Basin features
- River system: Pumping

Ganges-Kobadak Irrigation Project (Bengali: গঙ্গা-কপোতাক্ষ সেচ প্রকল্প) or G-K Project (Bengali: জি-কে প্রকল্প) is a large surface irrigation system of Bangladesh to serve the Southwestern part of Bangladesh. Kushtia, Chuadanga, Magura & Jhenaidah District are served by this project.

== History ==
The initial survey to set up the project was conducted in 1951, but the Government of Pakistan approved the project proposal in 1954. Implementation of the project started during the fiscal year 1954–55. In 1962–63, some local rice varieties were cultivated under this irrigation project for the first time. At that time HYV rice was not available in the area. Afterward, the cultivation of HYV rice became popular among the farmers. The project was planned and designed for supplementary irrigation alone, but it is currently being utilized to irrigate an additional HYV crop with higher water demand. Till 1999, the maximum achievement of irrigation reached 43,000 ha in the first season, while 99,000 ha were irrigated during the second season.

== See more ==
- Kushtia Main Canal
