= Poradaha Union =

Poradaha Union পোড়াদহ ইউনিয়ন
- Union
- Poradaha Union
- Location within Bangladesh
- Coordinates: 23.8667°N 89.0309°E
- Country: Bangladesh
- Division: Khulna
- District: Kushtia
- Upazila: Mirpur

Area
  - Total: 73.04 km^{2} (28.20 sq mi)

Population (2011)
  - Total: 27,737
  - Density: 379.8/km^{2} (983.6/sq mi)
- Time zone: UTC+6 (BST)
- Website: poradahaup.kushtia.gov.bd

Poradaha Union (Bengali: পোড়াদহ ইউনিয়ন) is a union parishad of Mirpur Upazila, in Kushtia District, Khulna Division of Bangladesh. The union has an area of 73.04 square kilometres (28.20 sq mi) and as of 2001 had a population of 33,410. There are 7 villages and 5 mouzas in the union.
