= Amala (mythology) =

Amala is a mythological giant who supports the world in the mythology of the Tsimshian, Nass, Skidegate, Kaigani, Massett, and Tlingit Native Americans. He supports the Earth which he balances on a spinning pole. He receives an annual application of wild duck-oil to his muscles from a servant which brings relief to his muscles. The belief is that when all the ducks are hunted out, there will no longer be any duck-oil available in the world. At this point, Amala dies and the world topples off the pole and comes to an end.

== The myth ==
The name Amala refers to his being very dirty and literally means “smoke hole.” Amala is said to be the youngest child in a family who is physically weak and lazy. He is made to sleep in the ashes and suffers mistreatment from everybody. In many variants of the myth, Amala sleeps in his urine.

Late in his life he attains supernatural strength in secret and becomes a handsome, and powerful young man who performs many daring feats and turns savior and protector for his relatives against their enemies. The concluding feat of his life is to succeed a dying chief on an island in the Southwest sea in the task of holding the Earth up. The dying chief hears of Amala's various exploits and, impressed by his prowess, calls the hero. When Amala arrives, the chief hands over the long pole upon which the flat world revolves.

Some versions of the myth state that the chief places the pole on Amala's chest, while some versions hold that the pole is held behind Amala's back. A servant relieves Amala's muscles with yearly application of spoonfuls of duck grease and wild-duck oil which help Amala to keep the world spinning.

== Possible influences ==
There is a possibility that the myths about Amala and similar heroes of Native American mythology were influenced by the tales of Cinderella and Atlas - the titan who carries the world on his shoulder in Greek mythology, introduced into Native American culture from Europe. There is a similarity between Cinderella and Amala in that both sleep in ashes and both are abused by their tribe or family. The storyline of Amala - the despised member of the tribe who overcomes adversity and rises to be a hero among his people, may be a combination of elements of the downtrodden and derided hero or heroine, such as Cinderella, and the hero of the Atlas-type who dwells in the underworld.

== See also ==
- Tsimshian mythology
