= Scopula amala =

Scientific classification
- Domain: Eukaryota
- Kingdom: Animalia
- Phylum: Arthropoda
- Class: Insecta
- Order: Lepidoptera
- Family: Geometridae
- Genus: Scopula
- Species: S. amala

Binomial name
- Scopula amala (Meyrick, 1886)

Synonyms
- Acidalia amala Meyrick, 1886; Acidalia lacteisabulosa Rothschild, 1915; Acidalia parasira Meyrick, 1889; Scopula parasira

Species of geometer moth in the subfamily Sterrhinae

Scopula amala is a moth of the family Geometridae. It was described by Edward Meyrick in 1886. It is found on New Guinea and Australia.
