= Ameleh =

Ameleh عامله
- Village
- Location within Iran
- Coordinates: 34°23′20″N 47°41′46″E
- Country: Iran
- Province: Kermanshah
- County: Sahneh
- Bakhsh: Central
- Rural District: Sahneh

Population (2006)
  - Total: 255
- Time zone: UTC+3:30 (IRST)
  - Summer (DST): UTC+4:30 (IRDT)

Ameleh (Persian: عامله, also Romanized as ‘Āmeleh; also known as Amala) is a village in Sahneh Rural District, in the Central District of Sahneh County, Kermanshah Province, Iran. At the 2006 census, its population was 255, in 69 families.
