= Sadarpur Union, Mirpur =

Sadarpur Union সদরপুর ইউনিয়ন
- Union
- Sadarpur Union
- Location within Bangladesh
- Coordinates: 23.9015°N 88.9139°E
- Country: Bangladesh
- Division: Khulna
- District: Kushtia
- Upazila: Mirpur

Area
  - Total: 77.52 km^{2} (29.93 sq mi)

Population (2011)
  - Total: 35,023
  - Density: 451.8/km^{2} (1,170/sq mi)
- Time zone: UTC+6 (BST)
- Website: sadarpurup.kushtia.gov.bd

Sadarpur Union (Bengali: সদরপুর ইউনিয়ন) is a union parishad of Mirpur Upazila, in Kushtia District, Khulna Division of Bangladesh. The union has an area of 77.52 square kilometres (29.93 sq mi) and as of 2001 had a population of 35,023. There are 7 villages and 5 mouzas in the union.

In 2017 criminals destroyed part of a local orchard after cutting down over 100 banana trees, within the Kushtia district.
