= Amla Union =

Amla Union আমলা ইউনিয়ন
- Union
- Amla Union
- Location within Bangladesh
- Coordinates: 23.9042°N 88.9290°E
- Country: Bangladesh
- Division: Khulna
- District: Kushtia
- Upazila: Mirpur

Area
  - Total: 42.92 km^{2} (16.57 sq mi)

Population (2011)
  - Total: 23,737
  - Density: 553.1/km^{2} (1,432/sq mi)
- Time zone: UTC+6 (BST)
- Website: amlaup.kushtia.gov.bd

Amla Union (Bengali: আমলা ইউনিয়ন) is a union parishad situated at Mirpur Upazila, in Kushtia District, Khulna Division of Bangladesh. The union has an area of 42.92 square kilometres (16.57 sq mi) and as of 2001 had a population of 23,737. There are 11 villages and 6 mouzas in the union.
