= Mirpur Upazila =

Mirpur মিরপুর (কুষ্টিয়া)
- Upazila
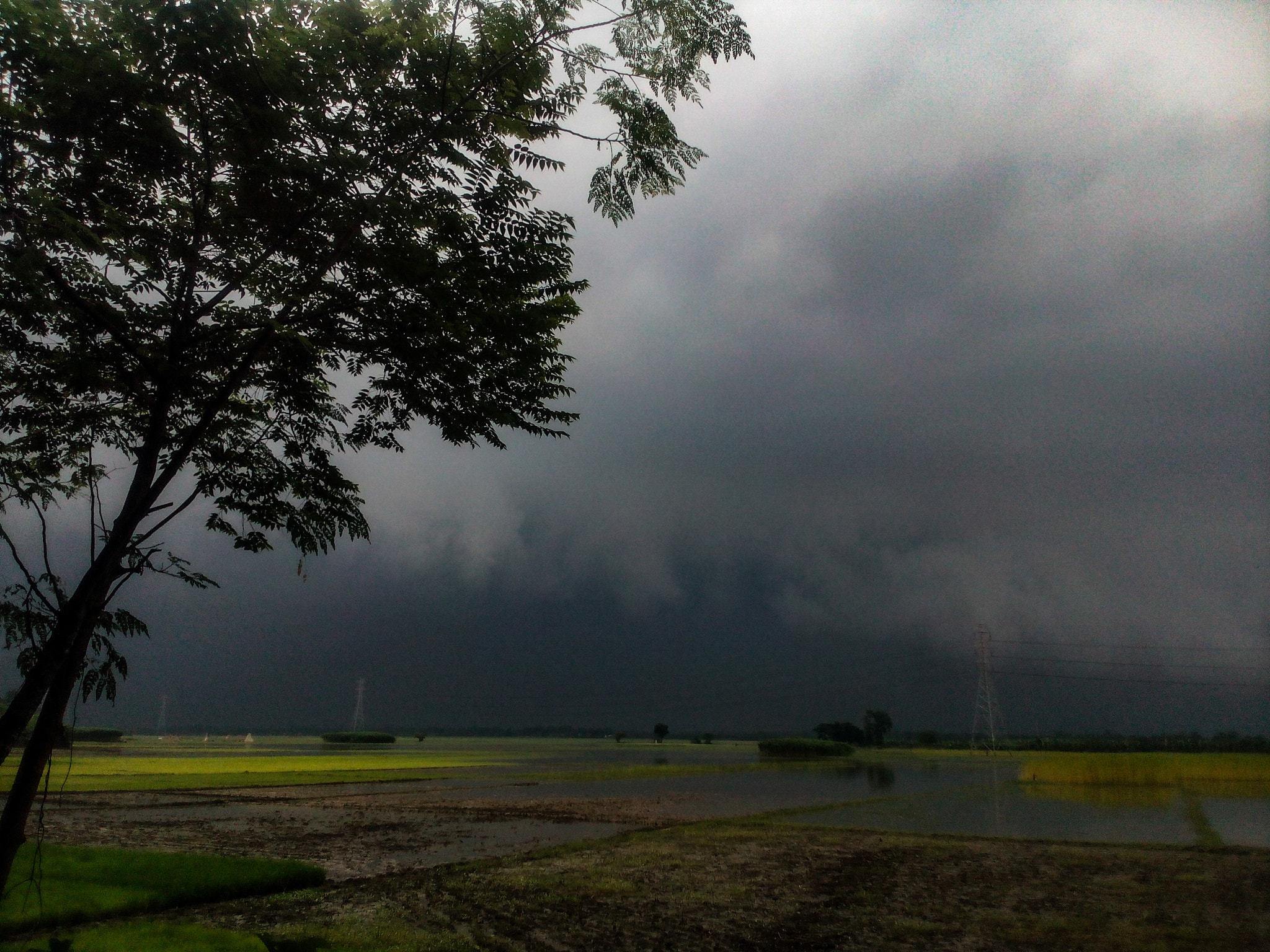
- Village in Mirpur Upazila

- Coordinates: 23°56′N 89°0′E
- Country: Bangladesh
- Division: Khulna
- District: Kushtia

Area
  - Total: 305.06 km^{2} (117.78 sq mi)

Population (2022)
  - Total: 363,106
  - Density: 1,190.3/km^{2} (3,082.8/sq mi)
- Time zone: UTC+6 (BST)
- Postal code: 7030
- Website: Official Map of Mirpur

Mirpur Upazila mauza geocode map

Mirpur (Bengali: মিরপুর (কুষ্টিয়া) is an upazila of Kushtia District in the Division of Khulna, Bangladesh. Mirpur Thana was formed in 1885 and it was turned into an upazila in 1983.

== History ==
Mirpur was listed in the Ain-i-Akbari as a mahal in sarkar Mahmudabad. It was listed with an assessed revenue of 2,370 dams.

The former Mirpur Thana, which was formed in 1885 became an upazila on 1 August 1983.

== Geography ==
Mirpur is located at 23.9333°N 89.0000°E. It has a total area of 305.06 km^{2}.

The upazila is bounded by Bheramara and Ishwardi upazilas on the north, Alamdanga and Kushtia Sadar upazilas on the south, Kushtia Sadar upazila on the east, Daulatpur, Gangni and Alamdanga upazilas on the west.

== Demographics ==
Religions in Mirpur Upazila (2022)
Religion	Percent
Islam	97.89%
Hinduism	2.11%
Other or not stated	0.00%

According to the 2022 Bangladeshi census, Mirpur Upazila had 97,281 households and a population of 363,106. 8.32% of the population were under 5 years of age. Mirpur had a literacy rate (age 7 and over) of 65.77%: 66.15% for males and 65.41% for females, and a sex ratio of 95.29 males for every 100 females. 47,803 (13.17%) lived in urban areas.

== Administration ==
Mirpur Upazila is divided into Mirpur Municipality and 13 union parishads: Ambaria, Amla, Bahalbaria, Baruipara, Chhatian, Chithalia, Dhubail, Fulbaria, Kursha, Malihad, Poradaha, Sadarpur, and Talbaria. The union parishads are subdivided into 116 mauzas and 192 villages.

Mirpur Municipality is subdivided into 9 wards and 9 mahallas.

== Education ==
According to Banglapedia, Amla Sadarpur Secondary School, founded in 1899, Mirpur Government Pilot Girls' High School (1983), Mirpur Pilot High School (1913), and Poradaha High School (1927) are notable secondary schools.

== See also ==
- Upazilas of Bangladesh
- Districts of Bangladesh
- Divisions of Bangladesh
- Thanas of Bangladesh
- Villages of Bangladesh
- Administrative geography of Bangladesh
