= Muhammad Azam =

Muhammad Azam may refer to:

- Muhammed Azam Didamari, Sufi Kashmiri writer
- Muhammad Azam (weightlifter), Pakistani weightlifter
- Muhammad Azam Shah, Mughal emperor in 1707
- Mohammad Azam, Emirati cricketer
- Mohammad Azam (professor)
