= M. Rafiqul Islam =

Bangladeshi academic and writer

- এম রফিকুল ইসলাম

8th Vice-Chancellor of Islamic University, Bangladesh
- In office 3 April 2004 – 10 July 2006
- Preceded by: Muhammad Mustafizur Rahman
- Succeeded by: Foyez Muhammad Sirazul Haque

Personal details
- Spouse: Selima Islam
- Children: Tuhin; Saiful
- Relatives: See Majumder–Zia family
- Education: Rajshahi University
- Occupation: University academic, Professor

M. Rafiqul Islam (Bengali: এম রফিকুল ইসলাম) is a Bangladeshi academic, professor and writer. He was the eighth vice-chancellor of Islamic University, Bangladesh. He is a prominent professor in the economics department of Rajshahi University. He serve as vice-chancellor at Islamic University more than 2 years from 3 April 2004 to 10 July 2006.

== Career ==
He was President of Zia Parishad at Rajshahi University as of 2012. He was the treasurer of Pundra University of Science and Technology, Bogra in 2019.

=== Vice-chancellorship ===
He was appointed vice-chancellor at Islamic University, Bangladesh on 3 April 2004. In November 2005, Islamic University Teachers' Associations (IUTA) accused him of corruptions, irregularities, and violation of university ordinance. Rafiqul Islam submitted his resignation letter to the education ministry in July 2006 for pressure from local job candidates and political issues.

== See also ==
- Shaikh Abdus Salam
- Rashid Askari
