= 2023 Islamic University, Kushtia ragging incident =

University bullying incident in Bangladesh

2023 Islamic University ragging incident
- Date: February 12, 2023
- Time: 23:00–03:30 (BST)
- Location: Islamic University, Bangladesh; 23.7207°N 89.1497°E
- Type: Ragging, physical abuse, sexual harassment
- Perpetrators: Sanjida Chowdhury Antora; Tabassum Islam; Halima Akter Urmi; Israt Jahan Mim; Muabiya Jahan
- Participants: Bangladesh Chhatra League members
- Outcome: Permanent expulsion of 5 students
- Inquiries: Investigation by university administration and High Court Division

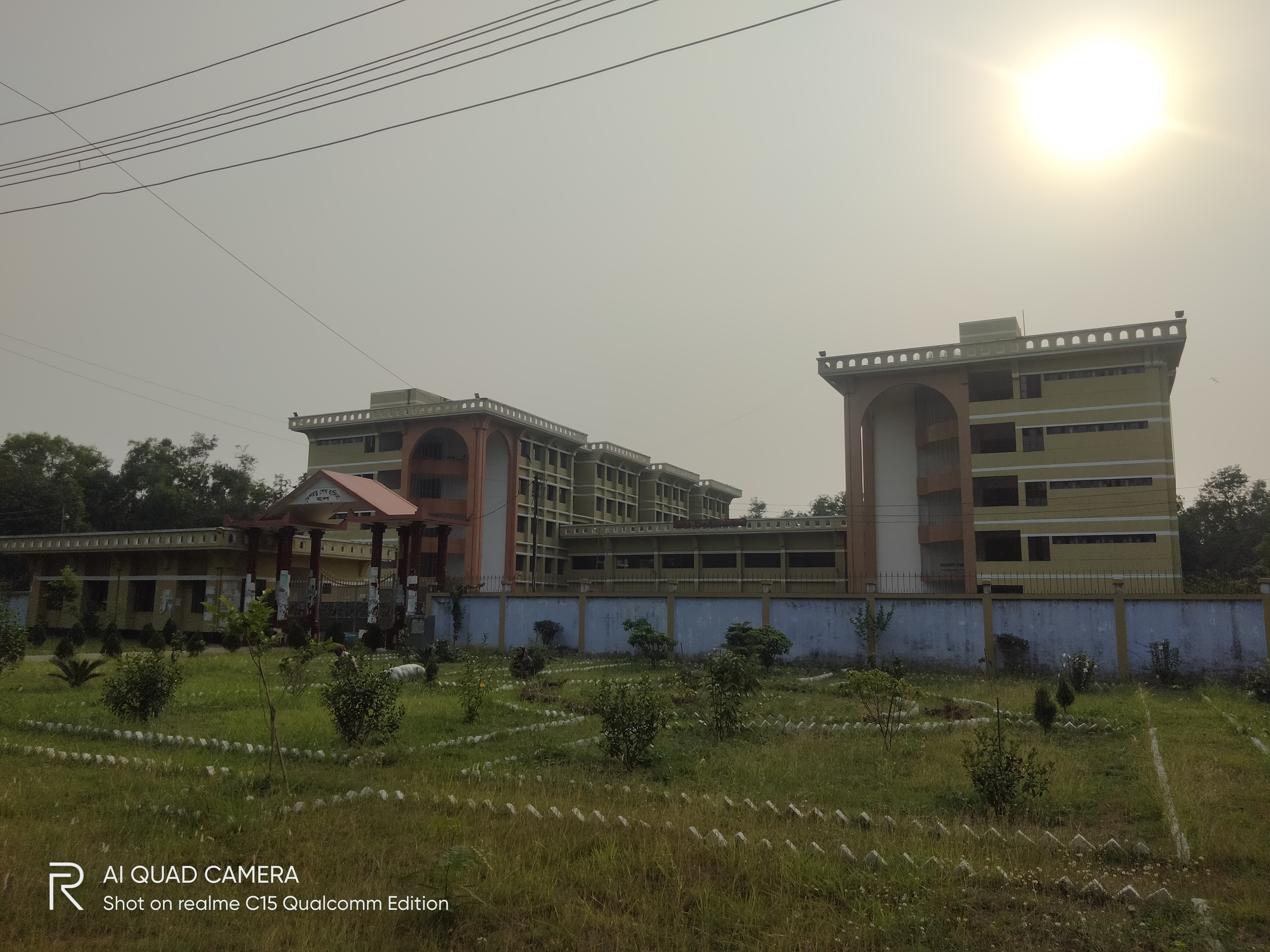
Deshratna Sheikh Hasina Hall, Islamic University, Bangladesh

The 2023 Islamic University ragging incident involved the physical and psychological abuse of Fulpori Khatun, a first-year student at the Islamic University, Bangladesh (IU) in Kushtia. The incident, which occurred on 12 February 2023, received widespread media attention in Bangladesh and sparked protests from academics and human rights organizations regarding the culture of ragging in public universities.

Following the incident, the High Court Division of the Supreme Court of Bangladesh intervened, leading to the permanent expulsion of five students associated with the Bangladesh Chhatra League (BCL) who were found responsible for the abuse. The case is often cited by activists as a significant precedent in the legal fight against campus violence.

== Background ==
Fulpori Khatun, a student from the 2022–23 academic session in the Department of Finance and Banking, hails from Shibpur village in Atghoria Upazila, Pabna District. On 8 February 2023, Khatun attended her first class. During an interaction with senior students, Tabassum Islam (session 2020–21) identified Khatun as a resident of the Desh Ratna Sheikh Hasina Hall. Reportedly irritated that Khatun had moved into the hall without notifying her, Tabassum ordered Khatun to meet her in room "Projapoti-2". Khatun, who was staying as a guest of another student, was unable to meet Tabassum due to illness. When classes resumed on 11 February, Tabassum allegedly reprimanded Khatun for failing to report to the room.

== Incident ==
On the night of 12 February, at approximately 11:00 pm, Sanjida Chowdhury Antora, the vice president of the university's Bangladesh Chhatra League unit, summoned Khatun to the "Doel" common room. According to the investigation, a group of five to six students detained Khatun in the room until 3:30 am.

Khatun testified that she was subjected to physical and psychological torture during this time. The abuse reportedly included slapping, punching, and being pricked with pins. Khatun stated she was forced to lick dirty glassware, sexually harassed, and filmed while stripped naked. The perpetrators allegedly threatened to release the video online and kill her if she disclosed the events. She was instructed to confess to the Provost that she was at fault and to leave the hall permanently.

On 14 February, Khatun submitted a formal written complaint to the university administration. In an interview with BBC Bangla, she recounted fearing for her life during the ordeal. Sanjida Chowdhury initially denied the allegations, claiming they were "propaganda" against the Chhatra League. However, the incident prompted other students to come forward with similar allegations, and many students reportedly left the hall out of fear.

== Investigation and legal proceedings ==
On 15 February, Vice-Chancellor Shaikh Abdus Salam formed a five-member investigation committee led by Reba Mondol of the Department of Law. Simultaneously, a writ petition was filed in the High Court Division by lawyer Gazi Mohammad Mohsin. The High Court bench, comprising Justice J. B. M. Hassan and Justice Razik-Al-Jalil, ordered the Deputy Commissioner of Kushtia to form an independent inquiry committee and directed that the accused be barred from campus during the investigation to ensure security.

The High Court also observed that the university's failure to address bullying contributed to the incident and advised the administration to draft specific anti-ragging regulations. Following the submission of investigation reports, the High Court ordered the temporary expulsion of the accused on 1 March 2023.

=== Disciplinary action ===
Five students, all members of the Bangladesh Chhatra League, were identified as the perpetrators. They were served show-cause notices and subsequently expelled permanently from Islamic University on 22 August 2023.

Students expelled in connection with the incident
Name	Academic session	Department	Affiliation
Sanjida Chowdhury Antora	2017–18	Statistics	Vice President, IU BCL
Tabassum Islam	2020–21	Finance and Banking	Activist, IU BCL
Halima Akter Urmi	2020–21	Fine Arts	Activist, IU BCL
Israt Jahan Mim	2020–21	Law	Activist, IU BCL
Muabiya Jahan	2020–21	Finance and Banking	Activist, IU BCL

== Reactions ==
The incident drew condemnation from various civil society groups. The Bangladesh Students' Union held protests at both Islamic University and University of Dhaka. The National Human Rights Commission of Bangladesh and Ain o Salish Kendra issued statements describing the act as "barbaric". Prominent academics, including Rasheda K Chowdhury and Anu Muhammad, publicly supported Khatun's decision to report the abuse. A joint statement by twenty-seven rights activists and intellectuals expressed concern over the safety of female students in university halls. The newspaper Prothom Alo highlighted the rarity of such formal complaints in the context of campus student politics.
