= Mukti Maitree =

Mukti Maitree Mukti Mitra
- মুক্তি মৈত্রী মুক্তি মিত্র
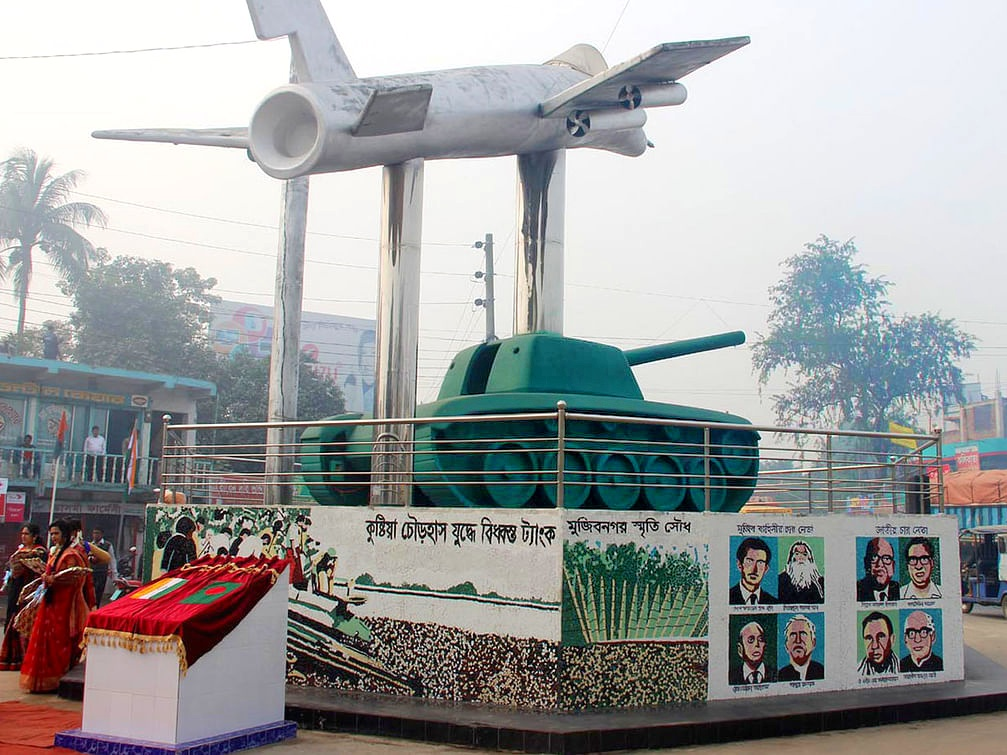
- Mukti Maitree Memorial during its inauguration on 10 December 2015
- Interactive map of the Mukti Maitree; Mukti Mitra area

General information
- Location: Chorhash intersection, Kushtia, Bangladesh
- Coordinates: 23.890635°N 89.110163°E
- Inaugurated: December 10, 2015; 10 years ago

Design and construction
- Architect: Manwar Hossain Dablu

Mukti Maitree (Bengali: মুক্তি মৈত্রী) is a sculpture located at Chorhash intersection in Kushtia. It is also known as Mukti Mitra (Bengali: মুক্তি মিত্র). On December 10, 1971, many soldiers of Mitro Bahini were killed during a battle with Pakistani troops. The next day on December 11, the Pakistani army was defeated by a counter-attack of Mitro Bahini and Kushtia was captured. A memorial was initiated in 1990 to preserve this memory. It is the first monument in the country to commemorate the members of the Mitro Bahini in Bangladesh.

== Context and history ==
On December 10, 1971, many soldiers of Mitro Bahini were killed in a battle with the Pakistan army. A few tanks and a plane were destroyed. The following day on 11 December, the Pakistan army was defeated by an allied counter-attack. Kushtia Independence Day is celebrated in Kushtia district on 11 December every year.

To preserve this memory, an initiative was taken to build a monument in 1990. But it was not implemented due to frequent design changes and economic complications. Construction was completed in 2015 after nearly 25 years of initiation. The name is Mukti Maitri. It was inaugurated on 10 December 2015 by the Governor of the Indian state of Tripura, Tathagata Roy.

The then Minister of Liberation War Affairs, AKM Mozammel Haque, joint general secretary of Awami League and former member of parliament of Kushtia-3 Mahbubul Alam Hanif, former member of parliament of Kushtia-4 Abdur Rauf, 11th vice-chancellor of Islamic University Abdul Hakim Sarkar, then Kushtia deputy commissioner Syed Belal Hossain, district council administrator Zahid Hossain Zafar, Kushtia District Awami League president Alhaj Sadar Uddin Khan and General Secretary Azgar Ali along with district and upazila pro-independence fighter commanders were present.

== Structure ==
There is a tank on top of a high and solid platform. Between the tanks and east of the platform is a fighter plane 2 columns up, 1 each.

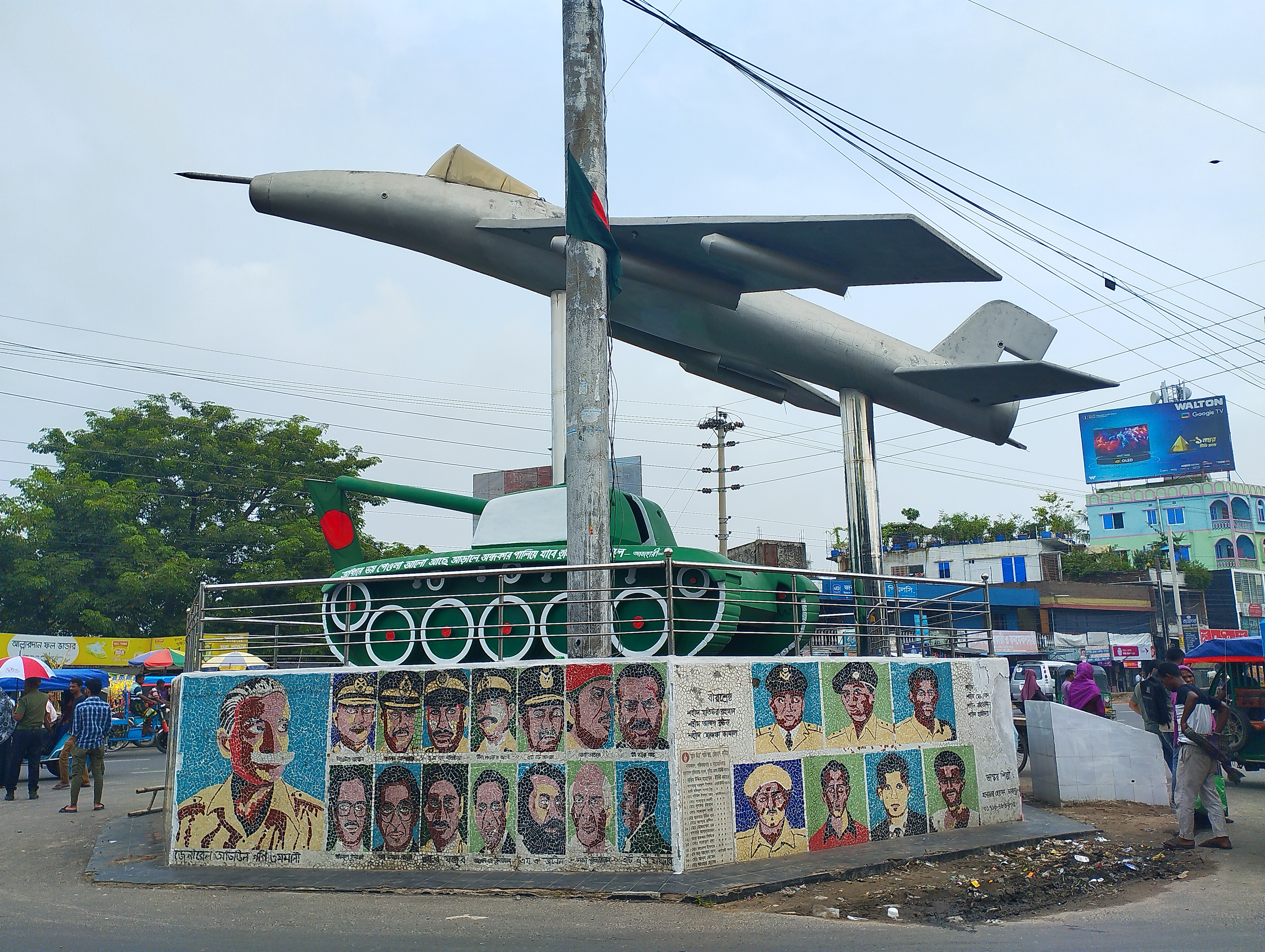

There are a total of 7 murals around the pillar. First, there are portraits of former Bangladesh President Sheikh Mujibur Rahman and former Indian prime minister Indira Gandhi. Then there is the picture of 7 March Speech of Sheikh Mujibur Rahman, the portraits of Syed Nazrul Islam, a leader of the Mujibnagar Government and Prime Minister Tajuddin Ahmad. There are also separately the portraits of the four national leaders, the Mujibnagar Memorial, the temporary capital of independent Bangladesh. Images of enthusiastic crowds cheering on battle-damaged tanks as they captured the city of Kushtia, along with a column of warplanes and tanks. There is a historical picture of the surrender of Pakistani forces on December 16, 1971, at Race Course Maidan and portraits of seven notable individuals. After the resignation of Sheikh Hasina on 5 August 2024, the structure suffered some damage and was vandalized.

== See more ==
- Bijoy Ullas
