= Serajul Huq =

Serajul Huq (Arabic: سراج الحق, romanized: Sirāj al-Haqq, lit. 'Lamp of the Truth') is a male Muslim given name. Notable bearers of the name include:

- Serajul Huq (educator) (1905–2005), Bangladeshi educator, scholar in Islamic studies
- Sirajul Haque Khan (1924–1971), Bangladeshi educator, expert in education research
- Sirajul Hoque Choudhury, Indian politician
- Serajul Huq (politician) (1925–2002), Bangladeshi lawyer
- Sirajul Haq Memon (1933–2013), Pakistani Sindhi language novelist, journalist, historian, linguist, and advocate of the Supreme Court
- Serajul Haque (1936–1994), Bangladeshi politician from Sherpur
- Mohammad Sirajul Haque (1947), Bangladeshi politician from Kurigram
- Siraj-ul-Haq (born 1962), Pakistani politician
- Sirajul Haq (Bangladeshi politician), Bangladeshi minister from Jamalpur
- Sirajul Haque Montu, Bangladeshi politician from Barisal
- Foyez Muhammad Sirazul Haque, Vice-Chancellor of Islamic University, Bangladesh
- Siraj-ul-Haque, Pakistani television director

== See also ==
- Siraj (name)
- Haqq (surname)
