= Sirajul Islam (disambiguation) =

Sirajul Islam (Bengali: সিরাজুল ইসলাম) is a Bengali masculine given name of Arabic origin. Notable people with the name include:

- Khan Bahadur Nawab Qazi Sirajul Islam (1845–1923), lawyer, activist and educational reformer
- Sirajul Islam Mia (born 1919), Bangladeshi former MP
- Mohammad Sirajul Islam Khan (1935–2013), businessman and politician
- Sirajul Islam Patwary (1935–2019), Bangladeshi member of parliament
- Serajul Islam Choudhury (born 1936), literary critic
- Sirajul Islam Hooghlawi (1938–2015), actor
- Kazi Sirajul Islam (born 1940), Bangladeshi politician and former MP
- Sirajul Islam Thanakandi (born 1941), historian, writer, columnist, professor and academician
- A. K. M. Sirazul Islam Khan (1943–2019), 1st Vice-Chancellor of Jagannath University
- Muhammad Sirajul Islam (1943–2020), politician and freedom fighter
- Sirajul Islam Maidandighi (1944–1996), Bangladeshi member of parliament
- Sirajul Islam Bhuiyan (1946–2016), former MP and freedom fighter
- Md. Shirajul Islam Mollah (born 1957), politician
- Sirajul Islam Charandwipi (died 2003), Bangladeshi member of parliament
- Muhammad Sirazul Islam (died 2004), 2nd Vice Chancellor of the Islamic University, Bangladesh (IU)
- Sirajul Islam Fatullahi (died 2012), Bangladeshi politician and freedom fighter
- Sirajul Islam Sarder, Bangladeshi politician and former MP
- Sirajul Islam Mridha, Bangladeshi politician and former MP
- Sirajul Islam Chowdhury, Bangladeshi politician and former MP
- Shah Sirajul Islam Chowdhury, Bangladeshi politician and former MP
- S. M. Sirajul Islam Suruj, Bangladeshi politician and former MP
- Sirajul Islam Netrokoni, Bangladeshi politician and former MP

== See also ==
- Sirajul Islam of the pair Mujibur and Sirajul, known for their appearances on The Late Show with David Letterman
- Dr. Sirajul Islam Medical College, Dhaka
- Bir Muktijoddha Sirajul Islam Stadium, Panchagarh

== See also ==
- Siraj (name)
- Islam (name)
