= Islamic University Laboratory School & College =

School and college in Kushtia District

Coordinates: 23.7268°N 89.1518°E

- ইসলামী বিশ্ববিদ্যালয় ল্যাবরেটরি স্কুল এন্ড কলেজ
- Islamic University Campus, Kushtia; Bangladesh

Information
- Other name: IU Laboratory School & College
- Type: School and College
- Established: 01 January, 1996 c. 1996; 30 years ago
- Founder: Islamic University, Bangladesh
- School board: Jessore Education Board
- Authority: Institute of Islamic Education and Research (IIER), Islamic University
- Head teacher: Golam Mamun

Islamic University Laboratory School & College, Kushtia is a Bangladeshi School run by the Institute of Islamic Education and Research (IIER) of the Islamic University, Kushtia, Shortly known IU Lab School and College. It is located inside Islamic University Kushtia. The school also affiliated to the Ministry of Education and Jessore Board of Education. This school was established in 1996, and college section open in 2000. This admissions are based on an entrance test and a viva-voce (oral examination) and Classes up to 1-12 are taught here.

== History ==
In March 1996, as per the decision of the Islamic University syndicate, the school started functioning with 150 students. For a long time after the construction, educational activities were conducted in the tin house next to the IU Thana gate. Then in 2004 a building was built on the north side of the campus.

== Admission ==
A total of 150 students are admitted annually to the college section, 50 in each of the science, humanities, and business education streams. Eligibility for admission in this school is GPA 4.5 in science and GPA 3.5 in humanities and business education.

== Academic ==
There are some building, a building established in 2014 with three floors and 2000 with four floors, The 4 floor building has been constructed at a cost of Tk 5.82 crore. This school have 14 teacher and more than 5 staff for general serving.

=== Achievements and activities ===
The school manages various cultural programmes, initiative programmes and intellectual competitions, Occasionally social awareness programs are organized here. Islamic University help and take such as programme. This school also attend Islamic University programme and event.
