= Muhammad Abdul Hamid =

Bangladeshi researcher, writer and academic

- মুহাম্মাদ আব্দুল হামিদ

Vice-Chancellor of Islamic University, Bangladesh
- In office 18 June 1991 – 21 March 1995
- Preceded by: Muhammad Sirazul Islam
- Succeeded by: Muhammad Enam-Ul Haque

Personal details
- Occupation: Writer, researcher, university academic.

Muhammad Abdul Hamid is a Bangladeshi economist, researcher, writer and academic. He was third vice chancellor (from 18 June 1991 to 21 March 1995) of Islamic University, Bangladesh. He was a professor in the Economics department at Rajshahi University. He directly contributed to the return of IU campus to Shantidanga.

== Early life and education ==
He was a student at Rajshahi University.

== Career ==
After graduation, Abdul Hamid joined the Economics department at Rajshahi University as a lecturer. He was promoted to professor. The focus of his research is economic growth and development, and economics crises.

=== IU VC ===
He was nominated as vice chancellor of Islamic University on 18 June 1991 by order of President Shahabuddin Ahmed. Then Islamic University academic activity was held in Kushtia city with some temporary building. Abdul Hamid able to return campus now place for her attention and hard work.

Professor of Islamic University Muid Rahman said,

Professor Hamid was a very honest and transparent man according to financially. And he appointed teachers based solely on teaching skills without any political influence.

He open Science and Technology faculty with science related department. He was forced to resign from the post of vice-chancellor due to the influence of local politics in the university teacher recruitment. He left in Islamic University on 21 March 1995, He act as vice chancellor during 3 years 9 months 3 days.

== Bibliography ==
=== Publications ===
Muhammad Abdul Hamid has many research and journal publications about 38 publications in 6 languages. Most influence and important journal below with reference.

- Integrated rural development programme : an evaluation of Natore and Gaibandha projects - Publish: 1975
- A Study of the BADC Deep Tubewell Programme in the Northwestern Region of Bangladesh.- Publish: 1977
- Review of land acquisition process : with reference to DFC-I & DFC-II projects. - Publish: 1975.
- Shallow tubewells under IDA credit in north west Bangladesh - Publish: 1982
- Low lift pumps under IDA credit in south east Bangladesh: a socio-economic study. - Publish: 984
- Survey on privatization of repair & maintenance facilities for Irrigation - Publish: 1984
- Employment generation, poverty-reduction, and sixth five year plan (FY2011-FY 2015) : role of Rajshahi Krishi Unnayan Bank to implement the plan- Publish:2012

=== Books ===
- Ganamilan-an Evaluation Report- Publish: 1975
- Irrigation technologies in Bangladesh - Publish: 1978 BC
- Swanirvar Gram Sarker and the Case of Sadullapur Model - Publish: 1980
- Lathyrism in Bangladesh : an agro-economic survey of two Lathyrismprone areas - Publish: 1986.
