= Siraj =

Siraj is Arabic: سراج, romanized: sirāj, lit. 'lamp, light', itself a loanword from Imperial Aramaic: שְׁרָגָא, romanized: šǝrāgā. It may refer to:

- Siraj (name), a common men's name in Muslim societies
- Saraz region, an area of Jammu, India
- Siraj (director), Indian film director
- Siraj (name), a list of notable people with Siraj as a given name or surname
- Siraj, a 1948 Indian film directed by Phani Sarma
