= Siraj (name) =

Siraj is a given name and surname from Arabic: سراج, romanized: sirāj, lit. 'lamp, light', itself a loanword from Imperial Aramaic: שְׁרָגָא, romanized: šǝrāgā. Notable people with this name include:

== Compound names ==
- Siraj-ul-Islam (lamp of Al-Islam)
- Siraj-ul-Haqq (lamp of Al-Haqq)
- Siraj-ul-Din (lamp of the religion)

== Given name ==
- Siraj Aurangabadi (1715–1763), Indian writer
- Siraj ud-Daulah (1733–1757), Nawab of Bengal
- Mehdi Siraj Ansari (1895–1961), Persian politician
- Begum Serajunnessa Choudhury (1910–1974), Bangladeshi politician
- Sirajul Hossain Khan (1926–2007), Bangladeshi politician
- Siraj Mehfuz Daud (1931–2010), Indian judge
- Muhammad Sirajul Hassan (1933–2020), Indian Islamic scholar and politician
- Serajur Rahman (1934–2015), British-Bangladeshi journalist
- Serajul Alam Khan (1941–2023), Bangladeshi political analyst, philosopher and writer
- Siraj Sikder (1944–1975), Bangladeshi activist
- Siraj Muhammad Khan (born 1947), Pakistani politician
- Siraj Haider (1948–2018), Bangladeshi actor and director
- Siraj Wahhaj (born 1950), American imam
- Agha Siraj Durrani (born 1953), Pakistani politician
- Siraj Kassam Teli (1953–2020), Pakistani businessman
- Siraj Ali (born 1954), British restaurateur
- Siraj Raisani (1963–2018), Pakistani politician
- Siraj Fegessa (born 1971), Ethiopian politician
- Siraj Din, Pakistani boxer
- Siraj Al-Tall (born 1982), Jordanian footballer
- Malik Siraj Akbar (born 1983), Baloch journalist
- Siraj Gena (born 1984), Ethiopian marathon runner
- Siraj Williams (born 1984), Liberian sprinter
- Mohamad Siraj Tamim (born 1985), Lebanese sprinter
- Sirajullah Khadim (born 1988), Bangladeshi cricketer
- Siraj Nassar (born 1990), Israeli footballer

== Surname ==
- Abd Allah Siraj (1876–1949), Arab politician
- Anwar Siraj (born 1978), Ethiopian footballer
- Farah Siraj, Jordanian singer
- Golam Mohammad Siraj (born 1950), Bangladeshi politician
- Khatijun Nissa Siraj (1925–2023), Singaporean women's rights activist
- Minhaj-i-Siraj (1193–??), Persian historian
- Mohammed Siraj (born 1994), Indian cricketer
- Waleed Siraj (born 1992), Sudanese footballer
- Shahawar Matin Siraj, Pakistani-American terrorist
- Shajahan Siraj (1943–2020), Bangladeshi politician
- Shakinul Siraj, Bangladeshi cricketer
- Syed Mustafa Siraj (1930–2012), Bengali writer
- Yasmin Siraj (born 1996), American figure skater

== See also ==
- Siraj (disambiguation)
