= Tapan Bagchi =

- Born: 23 October 1968 (age 57); Madaripur, East Pakistan, Present day Bangladesh
- Education: University of Dhaka; Islamic University, Bangladesh
- Occupations: Writer, fictionist, columnist, lyricist.
- Awards: Bangla Academy Literary Award 2023

Tapan Bagchi (born 23 October 1968) is a Bangladeshi poet, rhyme composer, researcher, and journalist. He is a major poet of his times in the Bengali language. He won Bangla Academy Literary Award 2023 for his contribution in the folklore.

== Education ==
Bagchi completed his primary education and was admitted to Kadambari High School- Madaripur. After passing the Higher Secondary Certificate examination from Government Rajendra College, Faridpur, he obtained a master's degree in Mass Communication and Journalism from the University of Dhaka. Later, he earned a Ph.D. from Islamic University, Kushtia.

== Career ==
Currently, he is serving as the Director of the Department of Folklore, Museums, and Archives at the Bangla Academy.

== Works ==
Bagchi has written many books in different fields, including poetry, children’s literature, essays, research, and folklore.

=== Poetry ===
- Nirbachito 100 Kobita
- Sokol Nodir Nam Gonga Chhilo
- Ontohin Kheter Gobhire
- Shmoshonei Shuni Shongkho Dhoni

=== Children’s and Rhyming Books ===
- Chorokaburi Oray Guri
- Chondoboddho Bhaver Poddo
- Sokalbela Smritir Vela

=== Research and Essays ===
- Books on folklore
- Rural culture,
- Journalism and media studies

== Awards ==
- Bangla Academy Literary Award, 2023
