= Nakib Muhammad Nasrullah =

Professor Dr. Nakib Muhammad Nasrullah

14th Vice-Chancellor of Islamic University, Bangladesh
- Incumbent
- Assumed office 24 September 2024
- Preceded by: Shaikh Abdus Salam

Personal details
- Born: Bagerhat District, Bangladesh
- Education: University of Dhaka; University of New South Wales, Australia; Macquarie University, Australia
- Occupation: Professor, University Administrator

Nakib Muhammad Nasrullah is a Bangladeshi academic, and the Vice-Chancellor of Islamic University. He is a law professor at the University of Dhaka. His research focuses on international trade, human rights, judicial systems, and Islamic jurisprudence. He has published approximately 35 research articles in national and international journals and authored several books.

== Education ==
Nakib completed his Alim degree at Dhaka Alia Madrasah. He earned an bachelors and master's in law from the Department of Law of the University of Dhaka in 1989 and 1990. In 2000, he obtained another master's in International Law from the University of New South Wales. He later pursued higher studies at Macquarie University earning an MPhil in Law in 2009 and a PhD in International Investment Law in 2014. During this period, he also served as a part-time lecturer at Macquarie University. Additionally, he has completed several diploma programs.

== Career ==
Nakib began his academic career in 1994 as a lecturer in the Department of Law at Islamic University. He was promoted to assistant professor in 1997 and associate professor in 2002. During this time, he served as Proctor and Provost of Saddam Hussein Hall at the university. He worked at Islamic University for 12 years until 2005.

In 2005, Nakib joined the University of Dhaka's Department of Law as an assistant professor. He was promoted to associate professor in 2010 and full Professor in 2015. At Dhaka University, he held various administrative roles, including House Tutor of Muktijoddha Ziaur Rahman Hall, Dean of the Faculty of Law, and Chairman of the Department of Law. He has also taught part-time at North South University. He expressed his solidarity for pro-Palestinian protestors in the United States. During the protests against Prime Minister Sheikh Hasina, he was critical of the government role. He was a candidate for the University of Dhaka senate election from the white panel affiliated with the Bangladesh Nationalist Party.

On 23 September 2024, Nakib was appointed vice-chancellor of Islamic University replacing Shaikh Abdus Salam, who had resigned in the aftermath of the fall of the Sheikh Hasina led Awami League government. He was appointed for a four-year term. He renamed five buildings of the university, including Sheikh Mujibur Rahman Hall to Shah Azizur Hall. This decision was condemned by the Chhatra Union saying, "Renaming a residential hall after an identified war criminal like Shah Azizur Rahman is a disgraceful decision for the nation". Nakib defended the decision saying he was present at the inauguration of the university and was an important leader of the Bangladesh Nationalist Party.
