= Maimul Ahsan Khan =

Bangladeshi legal scholar

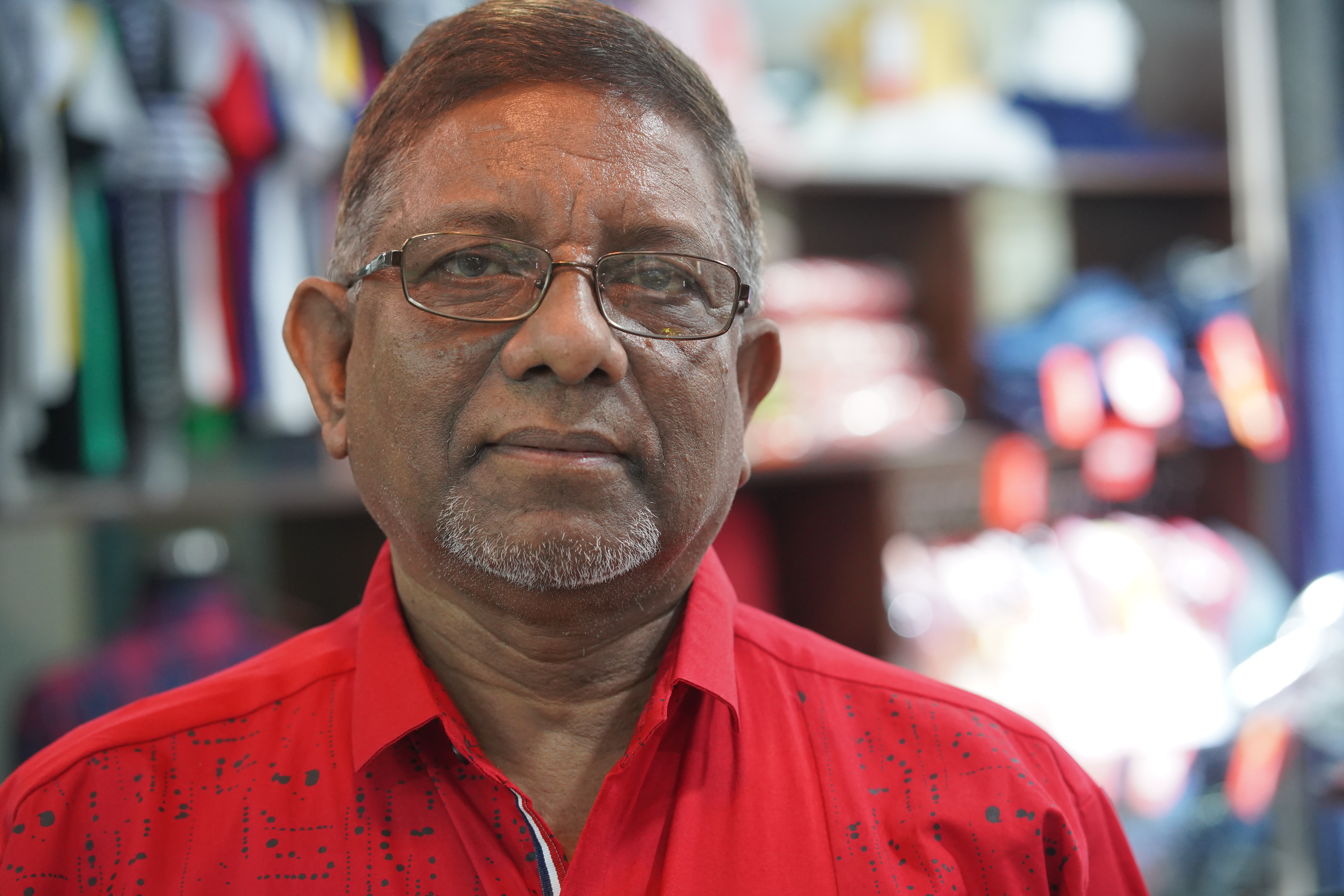
- Khan in 2019
- Born: December 22, 1954 (age 71); Chandpur, Bangladesh
- Political party: National Citizen Party
- Relatives: Hashem Khan (cousin)

Academic background
- Education: Tashkent State University, University of California, Davis

Academic work
- Institutions: University of Dhaka; Islamic University, Bangladesh
- Notable works: Human Rights in the Muslim World: Fundamentalism, Constitutionalism, and International Politics

Maimul Ahsan Khan (Bengali: মাইমুল আহসান খান; born December 22, 1954) is a Bangladeshi scholar of jurisprudence and comparative law and a former professor of law at the Faculty of Law, University of Dhaka. His work focuses on jurisprudence, Islamic law, Islam and Muslim culture, political science, human rights, Middle Eastern, South Asian and Oriental studies. In 2012, the IIE Scholar Rescue Fund featured him as one of the persecuted academics in the world. Khan is currently serving as the Dean, Faculty of Law at International Islamic University Chittagong.

== Biography ==
=== Origin and education ===
Born on December 22, 1954, in Chandpur, Bangladesh, Khan studied in the former Soviet Union and obtained his LLM with honors in 1981 and a PhD in jurisprudence in 1985 from Tashkent State University. He received a master's in international commercial law from the University of California, Davis.

=== Career ===
Khan began his academic career as a Research Fellow at the U.K. based Islamic Foundation in Markfield, Leicestershire in 1986 and was appointed assistant professor of law at the University of Dhaka in 1990. He became a full professor at the same university in 2007. Khan taught at the University of Illinois-UIUC from 1998 to 2002, the University of California-Davis and Berkeley from 2002 to 2006, and the Technical University of Liberec-Czech Republic. He has served as a Fulbright Fellow at the College of Law in University of Illinois-UC and as a country specialist on Afghanistan at Amnesty International (2001-2006).

Khan chaired the Department of Law at the University of Dhaka and the Islamic University, Bangladesh at Gazipur (Later on this university was moved permanently to Kushtia), and has served as a Research Fellow at Bangladesh Institute of International and Strategic Studies. He has also served as the Dean of the Faculty of Social Science at Leading University. He was awarded IIE-SRF fellowship by the Institute of International Education (IIE). He was one of the judges of the international symbolic court held at Imam Sadiq University in Tehran that sentenced Myanmar's de facto leader Aung San Suu Kyi to fifteen years in jail for her support for an ethnic cleansing campaign against the country's minority Rohingya Muslims.

== Views ==
According to Ali Riaz, Khan is sympathetic to Islamists. Arthur Klinghoffer states in a review of Khan's Human Rights in the Muslim World that Khan supports a moderate interpretation of the Quran and rejects what some refer to as "extreme" or "political" Islam. He believes that legal ideas dating back to the Prophet Mohammed's time have been distorted by governments and colonization, resulting in what is presently known as "Muslim law" rather than pure "Islamic law" in practice. He refers to Muslim extremists as "Muslim fundamentalists". Abdullahi Ahmed An-Na'im called his Human Rights in the Muslim World an "exposition and analysis of the state of human rights in certain parts, mainly Asian, of the Muslim world", while criticizing it for failing to offer "a theory or coherent methodology for promoting human rights". Khan hopes to encourage dialogue and cross-cultural understanding among the world's nations by eradicating sectarianism, particularly from Muslim societies.

== Selected works ==
Khan has authored books and scholarly articles in English, Russian and Bengali. His books include:

In English

- Khan, Maimul Ahsan (1998). Huntington's Civilization Issues and Morality in Law. Dhaka: Bishwa Shahitya Bhaban. OCLC 40551085.
- —— (2003). Human Rights in the Muslim World: Fundamentalism, Constitutionalism, and International Politics. Durham, N.C.: Carolina Academic Press. ISBN 0-89089-045-5.
- —— (2010). Introducing Fethullah Gulen in Bengal and Beyond. Nahar Light Foundation. ISBN 978-984-3313-29-4.
- —— (2011). Jurisprudence: Reconstructing the Ideals of Politics, Legality and Morality. Dhaka: Law's Empire Publishing. ISBN 978-9843318114.
- —— (2011). The Vision and Impact of Fethullah Gulen: A New Paradigm for Social Activism. New York: Blue Dome. ISBN 978-1-935295-09-9.
- —— (2012). Islamic Financing and Banking: From Traditional Views to Arab Spring. Malaysia: Lincoln University Press. ISBN 978-967-10937-0-2.
- —— (2014). Introduction to Legal Theories: Basic Jurisprudential Studies. Dhaka: Bangladesh Institute of Islamic Thought. ISBN 978-984-8471-25-8.
- —— (2017). International Institutional Law: Globalization vis-a-vis Protectionism. Dhaka: BIIT. ISBN 978-984-84-7161-6.
- —— (2018). Jurisprudence And Constitutionalism (An Introduction For Students And Lawyers). Dhaka: Kamrul Book House. ISBN 9789843319814.

In Bangla

- —— (1995). Rastrobigyan (Political Science). Self Prokashoni.
- —— (1997). Greek O Muslim Monishay Ain O Rajniti (Law and Politics in Greek and Muslim Thoughts). Khoshroj Kitab Mohol.
- —— (1997). Rastroniti- Rajniti Ain O Manobadhikar (State Policy: Law, Politics and Human Rights). Self Prokashoni.
- —— (1998). Somokalin Muslim Biswa: Islam O Bangladesh (Contemporary Muslim World: Islam and Bangladesh). Biswasahitya Bhaban.
- —— (1998). Oporadhbigyan: Monorog O Ainer Shashon (Criminology: Psychological Disorder and Rule of Law). Muktochinta Prokashon.
- —— (1998). Muslim American juddho: Markin Juktorastre Islam (Muslim American War: Islam in the United States). Biswasahitya Bhaban.
- —— (1998). Sangbidhanik Ain: Rajnitite Dhormo O Shwadhinota (Constitutional Law: Freedom and Religion in Politics). Biswasahitya Bhaban.
- —— (1998). Manobadhikar O Rohingya Sharanarthy: Bangladesh Prekkhit (Human Rights and Rohingya Refugees: Bangladesh Perspective). Biswasahitya Bhaban.
- —— (2014). Banglar Hemonte Arab Bosonto (Arab Spring in the Autumn of Bengal). Uttoron.
- —— (2017). Rohingyader Manobadhikar: Antorjatik Ain O Rajnoitik Bastobota (Human Rights of Rohingyas: International Law and Political Reality). Kamrul Book House. ISBN 9789843319609.
- —— (2018). Turosker Bhut Bhobisyot: Biswayito Gulen Andolon Shikkha Dikkhar Namoi Somaj Songskar (The Past and the Future of Turkey: Globalized Gulen Movement, Education as Social Reform). Kamrul Book House.

Edited

- —— (2008). Islamic Jurisprudence and Women's Rights: Relevance to Modern Trade and Business. Dhaka: Nahar Light Foundation. OCLC 889632291.
- —— (2019). Preemptive Military Intervention of Big Power: Chaotic "New Order" Syndrome & Challenges of International Law. Dhaka: Kamrul Book House. ISBN 978-984-33-1986-9.

Translated (into Bangla)

- Ziring, Lawrence (1992). Bangladesh from Mujib to Ershad: An Interpretive Study. Oxford University Press.
