= M. Alauddin =

Bangladeshi Chemist and academician

Muhammad Alauddin

10th Vice-Chancellor of Islamic University, Bangladesh
- In office 9 March 2009 – December 2012
- Preceded by: Foyez Muhammad Sirazul Haque
- Succeeded by: Abdul Hakim Sarkar

Personal details
- Education: University of Saskatchewan; University of Rajshahi
- Occupation: University academic, chemist

Muhammad Alauddin is a Bangladeshi chemist and university professor. He was the tenth vice-chancellor of the Islamic University, Bangladesh, from March 2009 to December 2012. He is a life Member (MRSC) of the Royal Society of Chemistry in UK.

== Career ==
Alauddin obtained a Bachelor and Master's degree in Chemistry from the University of Rajshahi, and a PhD degree from the University of Saskatchewan in Canada. He was a professor of Applied Chemistry and Chemical Engineering (ACCE) department at Islamic University, Bangladesh. He was the founding chairman of this department in 1995, and was also founding chairman of the Biotechnology and Genetic Engineering department in 1998. He served in the latter department as a chairman for more than a year.

=== Vice-chancellorship ===
On March 9, 2009, Alauddin was appointed vice-chancellor of the Islamic University in Bangladesh, where he worked in the M. A. Wazed Miah Science Building, Sheikh Hasina Hall, and Central Shaheed Minar. At the time, the political situation of the university was tenuous; the Islamic University Teachers Association (IUTA) accused Alauddin and pro-vice-chancellor Kamal Uddin of corruption, and nepotism. As a result, he and Pro VC Kamal Uddin was removed from the administrative charge of the Islamic University, Bangladesh.

== Research ==
- Volumetric Properties of Secondary Butanol and Tertiary Butanol in Water and Aqueous Micellar Systems of Sodium Dodecyl Sulphate - Section B: Chemical and Biological Sciences.
