= Mohammad Ali Moni =

Bangladeshi Computer engineer and researcher

Dr. Mohammad Ali Moni
- মোহাম্মাদ আলী মনি
- Born: Moni
- Education: Islamic University, Bangladesh; University of Cambridge
- Awards: Cambridge Commonwealth Trust award (2015)
- Scientific career
- Fields: Cancer and bone genetics, AI and machine learning
- Workplaces: University of Cambridge; University of Sydney; University of New South Wales; Pabna University of Science & Technology
- Thesis: Clinical bioinformatics and computational modelling for disease comorbidities diagnosis (2011-2015)

Mohammad Ali Moni is a Bangladeshi computer engineer, researcher and data analyst. He has done research in various institutions including University of New South Wales, Cancer Research UK Cambridge Institute and so on. He is research fellow in the Cancer Research Network of Faculty of Medicine in Sydney University and bone division of Garvan Institute of Medical Research.

== Early life and education ==
Moni is born in Pabna District. He passed SSC from Pabna Zilla School in 1995. Then He got admitted into Computer Science and Engineering Department at Islamic University, Bangladesh in Kushtia. He did his PhD in clinical bioinformatics from the University of Cambridge.

== Career ==
- Research Fellow at University of Sydney (2017-12-08 to 2020-02-07)
- Research Fellow (Faculty of Medicine) at University of New South Wales (2015-02-02 to present)
- School of Public Health & Community Medicine at University of New South Wales (2020-02-10 to present)

== Works ==
He published more than 200 articles and book chapters. His research interest is Cancer and bone genetics, disease comorbidities, diseasome, co-infection and cancer, data science, AI and machine learning.
