= Mohammad Shamsuddin =

Bangladeshi sprinter

Personal information
- Nationality: Bangladeshi
- Born: 15 September 1983 (age 42)
- Education: Islamic University, Bangladesh
- Height: 5 ft 9 in (175 cm)

Sport
- Sport: Sprinting
- Event: 100 metres

Mohammad Shamsuddin (Bengali: মোহাম্মদ শামসুদ্দিন; born 15 September 1983) is a Bangladeshi sprinter. He competed in the men's 100 metres at the 2004 Summer Olympics. He was student of Islamic University, Bangladesh.
