= A. N. M. Momtaz Uddin Choudhury =

Bangladeshi academic and writer (1923–2005)

A. N. M Momtaz Uddin Choudhury
- এ.এন.এম মমতাজ উদ্দিন

1st Vice-Chancellor, Islamic University, Bangladesh
- In office 31 January 1981 – 27 December 1988
- Preceded by: Post Established
- Succeeded by: Muhammad Sirazul Islam

Director General, Directorate of Secondary and Higher Education
- In office 1961–1965

Personal details
- Born: 1923 Lakshmipur Sadar, Lakshmipur District, East Pakistan
- Died: 2 October 2005 (aged 81–82)
- Occupation: Academician, professor

A. N. M. Momtaz Uddin Chowdhury (1923 – 2 October 2005) was a Bangladeshi writer and academic. He was the first vice-chancellor (1981–1988) of Islamic University, Bangladesh. He also served as project director for establishing Islamic University, Bangladesh. He also served as the director general of the Directorate of Secondary and Higher Education in 1963.

== Early life ==
Choudhury was born in 1923 to a Bengali Muslim zamindar family in the village of Gangapur in Dalal Bazar, Lakshmipur, then under the Noakhali district of the Bengal Presidency. His mother's name is Fatema Begum. He spent his childhood with his family in this Gangapur village.

== Appointed at IU ==
=== Duty ===
In 1986, the OIC proposed to establish Islamic universities in different countries. In that context, Momtaz Uddin was appointed as the project director on 2 February 1989 to establish the Islamic University in Bangladesh. He served in this capacity for one and a half years. Then the journey of the Islamic University started with a total of 300 students in four departments under two faculties, and Momtaz uddin Chowdhury was appointed as the first vice-chancellor.

Two years later, the Ershad government transferred the Islamic University to Gazipur, In Gazipur Islamic University lasted for 7 years, In here Momtaz Uddin Chowdhury's term ended. He served as the vice chancellor of the Islamic University for 7 years and 11 months.

=== Removal ===
On 21 February 1987, the Islamic University Chhatra League got into a dispute with the vice-chancellor over giving flowers at the Shaheed Minar. The vice-chancellor forbade Chhatra League and all students by dragging religious issues. The students are arguing with the vice-chancellor over this issue, and the vice-chancellor is forced to resign. He was removed from the post of vice-chancellor just 4 days before the end of his term.

== Contributions ==
=== School establishment ===
Momtaz Uddin Choudhury and Advocate Akhtaruzzaman jointly established Dalal Bazar Fatema Girls High School, Lakshmiipur Sadar Upazila. which is a well-known girls' high school in the region। The girls' school is named after Momtaz Uddin's mother Fatema Begum

=== Books ===
- A Plan of Adult Education for Eastern Pakistan

== Personal life ==
Choudhury died on 2 October 2005. The Momtaz Uddin Choudhury Foundation is named in his honour.
