= Muhammad Mustafizur Rahman =

Bangladeshi Islamic scholar

Personal life
- Born: January 1, 1941 Surjamani, Firozpur, Backergunge District, Bengal Presidency
- Died: 14 January 2014 (aged 73) Dhaka, Bangladesh
- Education: University of Dhaka

Religious life
- Religion: Islam
- Denomination: Sunni
- Jurisprudence: Hanafi
- Tariqa: Sarsina

Muslim leader
- Teacher: Azizur Rahman Qaid

7th Vice-Chancellor of Islamic University, Bangladesh
- In office 10 December 2001 – 2 April 2004
- Preceded by: Muhammad Lutfar Rahman
- Succeeded by: M. Rafiqul Islam

Muhammad Mustafizur Rahman (January 1, 1941 – January 14, 2014) was a Bangladeshi Islamic scholar, academic and Quran translator. He served as the seventh vice chancellor of Islamic University, Bangladesh from December 10, 2001, to April 2, 2004. He also served as a professor at the University of Dhaka. The first Bangladeshi scholar to translate the Qur'an into English, Rahman wrote many books and scholarly articles on Islam.

== Early life and education ==
Mustafizur Rahman was born in 1941 in the Surjomoni village of Pirojpur district in the then East Pakistan (now Bangladesh). His father's name is Muhammad Abdul Majid Munshi and his mother's name is Lal Boru Begum. He studied Arabic literature at the University of Dhaka.

== Career ==
Rahman began his academic career as a lecturer at the Arabic department of the University of Dhaka. Later, he became a full professor and served as its chair. On December 10, 2001, Rahman was appointed as vice-chancellor of the Islamic University, Bangladesh. He could not, however, complete his term and eventually left the university on April 2, 2004.

== Death ==
Suffering from complications of old age, Rahman died on January 14, 2014, at United Hospital in Dhaka.

== Bibliography ==
Rahman wrote many books and scholarly articles on Islam. He is noted as the first Bangladeshi scholar to translate the Quran into English. His books include:

In Bangla

- Complete Bengali Translation of the Holy Quran (Bengali: কোরআন শরিফ পূর্ণাঙ্গ বঙ্গানুবাদ, ISBN 984-438-027-8
- The Holy Quran with Arabic-Bengali Pronunciation, Meaning and Shane Nuzul. (Bengali: আরবী বাংলা উচ্চারণ অর্থ ও শানে নুযুলসহ কোরআন শরীফ)
- The Message of the Qur'an (Bengali: কোরআনের বাণী)
- Introduction to the Quran (Bengali: কুরআন পরিচিতি)
- Al-Munir Arabic-Bengali Dictionary

In English

- Quran Majeed with Arabic Text and English Translation
- The Holy Quran with Bengali and English Pronunciation
