= Foyez Muhammad Sirazul Haque =

Bangladeshi professor and academic

Vice-Chancellor of Islamic University, Bangladesh
- In office 10 August 2006 – 8 March 2009
- Preceded by: M. Rafiqul Islam
- Succeeded by: M. Alauddin

Personal details
- Education: University of Dhaka
- Occupation: University academic, professor

Foyez Muhammad Sirazul Haque (Bengali: ফয়েজ মুহাম্মাদ সিরাজুল হক) is a Bangladeshi academic, professor and writer. He was the ninth vice-chancellor of Islamic University, serving from 10 August 2006 to 8 March 2009. He is also a professor in the English department of the university.

== Career ==
He is professor in the English department of Islamic University, Bangladesh. He has been teaching here for a long time. He was president of the Islamic University teachers association (IUTA). In 2006, the teachers of the university started a movement demanding the appointment of a teacher from the university as the vice-chancellor.

=== Vice-chancellorship ===
He was appointed vice-chancellor of Islamic University, Bangladesh on 10 August 2006. He served for approximately three years. He is first vice-chancellor as a teacher of Islamic University. He opened two departments of his time. He resigned on 8 March 2009 after being criticized for being close to some controversial teachers.
