= Muhammad Sirazul Islam =

Bangladeshi Academic and Professor

Professor Muhammad Sirazul Islam

2nd Vice-Chancellor

Islamic University, Bangladesh
- In office 28 Dec 1988 – 17 June 1991
- Preceded by: A. N. M Momtaz Uddin Choudhury
- Succeeded by: Muhammad Abdul Hamid

Personal details
- Children: Sabiha, Sabnam Shehnaz Coudhury Dipa
- Education: University of Calcutta
- Occupation: University professor, educator

Muhammad Sirazul Islam is a Bangladeshi educationist. He is a Professor in the department of Islamic History and Culture at Dhaka University, and he was the second vice chancellor of the Islamic University, Bangladesh (IU). He contributed to the relocation of the Islamic University from Gazipur district to Kushtia Shantidanga village.

== Education life ==
Sirazul Islam won the first place with first class in the MA examination from Calcutta University and won the gold medal.

== Career ==
He started his teaching career by joining Calcutta University as a lecturer. When India was partitioned in 1947, he joined the department of Islamic History and Culture at Dhaka University. In 1988, he became the Vice Chancellor of the Islamic University, Bangladesh.

=== IU campus relocated to Kushtia ===
After the removal of Momtaz Uddin Choudhury (first vice-chancellor of this university), Sirazul Islam was appointed as the second vice-chancellor of this university in 1986. In that time Islamic University campus was in Gazipur district. In 1990, the government decided to shift the Islamic University from Gazipur to Kushtia. About 90 percent of professor of Bangladesh protested at the National Press Club against the transfer decision. However, Vice Chancellor Sirazul Islam supported the transfer decision. Finally, on 24 February 1990, he was able to relocate to the Islamic University campus in Shantidanga Kushtia present campus.

Professor Mueed Rahman of the department of Economics of the Islamic University, Bangladesh acknowledged his contribution,

Apart from the first VC, there is no other scholarly person like Siraz Sir in the Islamic University, Bangladesh as the second VC, even the people who dislike him will openly admit it.

=== Resignation from Vice-Chancellorship ===
In 1991, the Vice-Chancellor was accused of undervaluing teachers on campus. He had to resign from the post of Vice-Chancellor on June 17, 1991 in the face of Bangladesh Chatra Dal movement and various domestic pressures.

== Legacy ==
Muhammad Sirazul Islam was a senior professor in the department of Islamic History and Culture at Dhaka University. A computer lab set up in the department was named after him. This lab was built with the financial support of Siraj Sir's family in 2016.

DU Vice-Chancellor Prof. Mohammed Akhtaruzzaman says,

The establishment of this lab will greatly benefit the departmental teachers, researchers and students and will remember the professor for ages. Siraj Sir would go deep into knowledge about any subject, his words were like quoting.
