= Muhammad Azam (weightlifter) =

Pakistani weightlifter (born 1939)

Personal information
- Nationality: Pakistani
- Born: 14 June 1939 (age 85); Lahore, Pakistan

Sport
- Sport: Weightlifting

Muhammad Azam (born 14 June 1939) is a Pakistani weightlifter. He competed at the 1960 Summer Olympics and the 1964 Summer Olympics.
