= Mohammad Azam (professor) =

Bangladeshi academic

- মোহাম্মদ আজম

19th Director General of Bangla Academy
- Incumbent
- Assumed office 5 September 2024
- Prime Minister: Muhammad Yunus (as Chief Adviser); Tarique Rahman
- Preceded by: Rashid Askari

Personal details
- Pronunciation: [moɦamːɔd̪ azɔm]
- Born: 23 August 1975 (age 51) Hatiya Upazila, Noakhali District, Bangladesh
- Education: University of Dhaka

Mohammad Azam (Bengali: মোহাম্মদ আজম, pronounced [moɦamːɔd̪ azɔm]; born 23 August 1975) is a Bangladeshi academic. He is the current and 19th director general of Bangla Academy.

== Early life and education ==
Azam was born on 23 August 1975 in Hatiya Upazila, Noakhali. He studied Bengali language and literature at University of Dhaka, where he completed his undergraduate and master’s degrees. Later, he earned a PhD for his research on colonisation and decolonisation of the Bengali language.

== Career ==
Azam began his teaching career at Dhaka Commerce College in 2000. In 2005, he joined the Department of Bengali at the University of Dhaka as a lecturer. He was promoted to assistant professor in 2008 and to associate professor in 2015, later becoming a professor. He has been serving as the Director General of Bangla Academy since 5 September 2024. His research interests include Bengali literature, aesthetics, history, cultural studies and the politics of language.

=== Director General of Bangla Academy ===
On 5 September 2024, Mohammad Azam was appointed as the 19th Director General of Bangla Academy for a three-year term under the provisions of the Bangla Academy Act, 2013. He officially assumed the role on 8 September 2024. Under his leadership, the Academy has taken steps toward institutional reform and modernization, including plans for digitalisation of activities.

In January 2025, he publicly announced that if any recipient of the Academy’s literary awards is found to have been involved in mass killings or anti-people politics, their award will be revoked. Moreover, Azam serves as member secretary of a reform committee formed in mid-2025 to review and restructure the Academy’s laws, organizational framework, and operational procedures.

== Books ==
He has authored and edited books such as:

- Bangla o Promito Bangla Samachar
- Nirbachito Kabita: Syed Ali Ahsan
- Kobi o Kobitar Sandhane.
