= Rashid Askari =

Bangladeshi writer and academic

Harun-Ur-Rashid Askari
- রাশিদ আসকারী
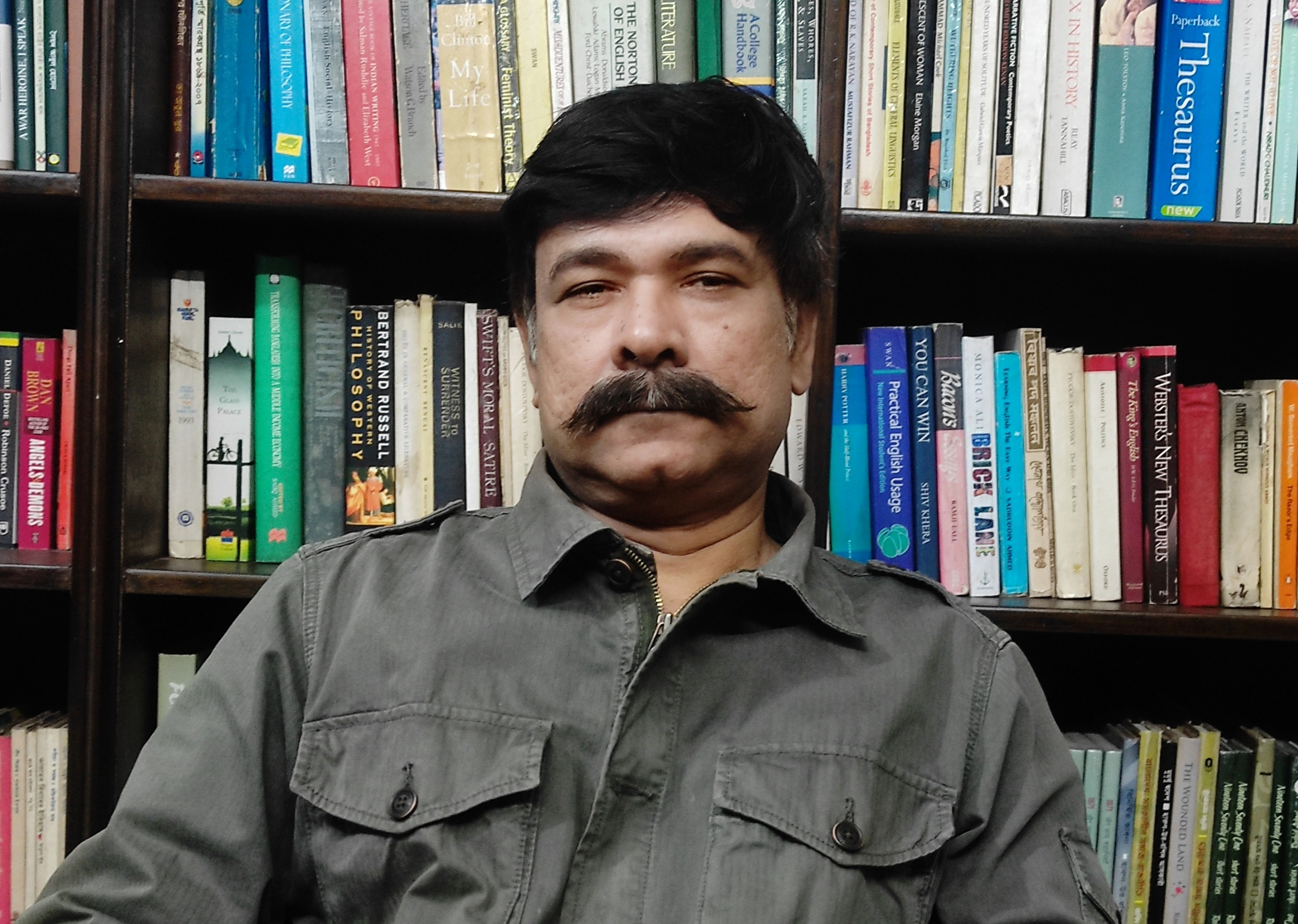
- Rashid Askari

Director General of Bangla Academy
- In office 18 July 2024 – 10 August 2024
- Preceded by: Mohammad Nurul Huda
- Succeeded by: Mohammad Azam

12th Vice-Chancellor of Islamic University, Bangladesh
- In office 21 August 2016 – 20 August 2020
- Preceded by: Abdul Hakim Sarkar
- Succeeded by: Shaikh Abdus Salam

Personal details
- Born: 1 June 1965 (age 61) Rangpur, East Pakistan, Pakistan
- Education: University of Dhaka; University of Pune
- Occupation: Bilingual writer, fictionist, translator, university academic, media personality

Harun-Ur-Rashid Askari (born 1 June 1965), popularly known as Rashid Askari, is a bilingual writer, fictionist, columnist, translator, media personality, and an eminent university academic in Bangladesh.Among the Bangladeshi writers after mid-1990s, he is easily on a par with the major ones who gained mastery over both Bangla and English. He was the 12th vice-chancellor of Islamic University, Bangladesh. He served as the Director General of the Bangla Academy for less than a month in 2024.

== Early life and education ==
Rashid Askari was born in Askarpur, Mithapukur, Rangpur in former East Pakistan in 1965 amidst the country’s turbulent history in the mid-sixties, and grew up in Bangladesh with a murky memory of the 1971 Liberation War and the days that went awry after Bangladesh won its freedom. He obtained Bachelor of Arts and Master of Arts degrees in English literature from Dhaka University, and a Doctor of Philosophy in Indian English Literature from the University of Poona".

== Career ==
Askari joined Islamic University, Bangladesh in 1990 as a lecturer in English. He was promoted to professor in 2005, and was appointed head of the Department of English and dean of the Faculty of Arts at different times. He served with King Khalid University - the Kingdom of Saudi Arabia as Professor of English for five years (2008-2013). He had a flair for creative writing since his school days. His debut as a writer was marked in 1996 by his book The Dying Homeland, and he has written articles, essays and newspaper columns on a variety of themes. He was the editor of Bangladesh's first multilingual international literary magazine, The Archer. He was elected the Secretary General of Federation of Bangladesh University Teachers' Association for 2014. He was also elected chairman of folklore studies department of the Islamic University in Kushtia". Rashid Askari has been nominated as a part-time member of the University Grants Commission of Bangladesh (UGC). He worked as a member of the international publication and translation sub-committee under "Bangabandhu's Birth Centenary Celebration National Implementation Committee" in the Mujib Year and translated Sheikh Mujibur Rahman's 10 January 1972 speech delivered at the Race Course into English. He also translated into English Mujib's UN speech made on 25 September 1974. He is a peer reviewer and a Quality Assurance (QA) expert nominated by the Quality Assurance Unit of the Government of Bangladesh. "Askari regularly writes columns in various national and international newspapers" addressing pressing geopolitical issues such as Bangladesh’s strategic policies on global and Indo-Pacific power dynamics, white supremacy, Islamophobia, refugee crises, climate change, colonial legacies, and the Fourth Industrial Revolution. "The areas of his academic interest include Modern and Postmodern literature, Colonial and Postcolonial literature, South-Asian Writing in English, Literary theory and Creative writing".

== Writing style ==
Askari stands out as a notable storyteller who brought Bangladeshi English literature into focus by coining the phrase "Bangladeshi Writing in English". Bangladeshi novelist and critic Syed Manzoorul Islam said of Askari:

He writes witty, racy stories with surprisingly serious undertones. Picking real-life events from the remote areas and the marginal people of the country and weaving them into various fictional forms are the hallmarks of his storytelling. Though not new in a ground-breaking way, his stories are both intense and original. The overall tone of his language is gently sarcastic.

His debut short story collection "Nineteen Seventy One and Other Stories (2011) is a prized inclusion in what we now call Bangladeshi writing in English". Here, Askari speaks of "a long-ago war, revisiting the age of brutality we emerged free of through beating back the denizens of darkness". "The book contains a dozen of mind-blowing stories mostly based on realistic events that took place either in faraway villages or the bustling metropolis in Bangladesh. However, the regional fictional representation does not evade universal significance." His "characters are ordinary men: a cowardly country teacher or an insignificant English Road whore or a wide-butt big-bust illiterate village wife torn apart by libido and jealousy at the same time or a suburban procrastinating self-delusional semi-fakir Jihadi, who seriously lacks guts and just wants to live and reproduce". As far as writing style is concerned, Askari "adopts both the first and third-person omniscient, contemplative point-of-view, depending upon the story. Each story is told from a past event, situation or a social issue and his acquaintance with it. In an age of aggressive intellectualism in the world and in the subcontinent, Askari has gone back to the older, subtler narrative style of twentieth century storytellers and has established himself as one of the trailblazers on the scene”. Distinguished global scholar and Professor of Social Work at Charles Stuart University, Australia Dr. Manohar Pawar in his 2019 Sage Journals review of Askari’s 2011 book says, “Sharp and minute detailed description of human behaviour, and pictorial presentation of events and settings in his carefully chosen words demonstrate Rashid Askari’s mastery in story writing/telling”. The book has been translated into French Language and also into Hindi". His 2002 Bengali book titled Postmodern Literary and Critical Theory has become a reference book for postgraduate students studying theory and made complex western theoretical concepts easily accessible to Bengali readers. Askari wrote the intellectual biography of the country's founding father Sheikh Mujibur Rahman, which is "based on authentic background information, factual accounts of events, historical research and clear elegant prose". He edited the English version of former Bangladesh Prime Minister Sheikh Hasina's book My Father, My Bangladesh published in Amar Ekushey Book Fair 2021. His 2026 Bengali book on postmodern literary reading opens "fresh doors to literary theory" and examines select legendary Bengali literary figures and their seminal works through western literary-critical lens.

== Bibliography ==
=== Books ===
- Mumūrṣu Shadēśa (The Dying Homeland), 1996
- Indō-inrēji Sāhitya ō An'yān'ya (Indo-English Literature and Others), 1996
- Ēkālēra Rūpakathā (Today's Folktale), 1997
- Binirmita Bhābanā (Deconstructing Thoughts), 2001
- Uttarādhunika Sāhitya ō Samālōcanā Tattba (Postmodern Literary and Critical Theory), 2002
- The Wounded Land: Peoples, Politics, Culture, Literature, Liberation War, War Crimes, and Militancy in Bangladesh, 2010
- Nineteen seventy one and other stories: a collection of short stories, 2011
- English Writings of Tagore(3 volumes) ed. 2012–13
- The Making of Mujib: an intellectual biography, Dhaka: 2022, Bangla Academy
- Bangladesh: Somokalin Somaj, Rajniti (Bangladesh: Contemporary Society-Politics) Dhaka: 2019
- Bangabandhu, Sheikh Hasina: Somokalin Bangladesh (Bangabandhu, Sheikh Hasina: Contemporary Bangladesh), Dhaka: 2022
- Adhunikottor Sahitya-Paath ( Postmodern Literary Reading), Ekushey Book Fair 2026

=== Short stories ===
- Lottery, 2011
- Nineteen seventy one, 2011
- Jihad, 2012
- Locked-in Syndrome, 2012
- Virus, 2017
- The Disclosure, 2019 - published in the emerging and seasoned writers publishing platform Kitaab'
- The virgin whore, 2019 - published in New York City and India based magazine Cafe Dissensus.
- A slice of sky, 2019

== Awards ==
- The Oitijjo Gold Medal 2019 by Bangladesh Folklore Research Centre of Rajshahi University.
- Janonetri Sheikh Hasina Award 2019.
- The Dhaka University Alumni News Award 2020.
- The Vidyasagar Award 2023 by Vidyasagar Society Dhaka.
