= Abdul Hakim Sarkar =

Bangladeshi writer and academic

- ডঃ আব্দুল হাকিম সরকার

11th Vice-Chancellor of Islamic University, Bangladesh
- In office 27 December 2012 – 30 June 2016
- Preceded by: M. Alauddin
- Succeeded by: Rashid Askari

Personal details
- Education: University of Dhaka
- Occupation: Writer, university academic

Abdul Hakim Sarkar (died 11 May 2025) was a Bangladeshi writer, academic, and professor. He was the 11th vice chancellor (27 December 2012 – 30 June 2016) of Islamic University, Bangladesh. He was a long time professor of Dhaka University at Social welfare and research institute.

== Early life and education ==
He was a student at Dhaka University, finished his graduation, and was appointed a lecturer at Dhaka University.

== IU VC appointment ==
Abdul Hakim Sarkar was appointed 11th vice chancellor of Islamic University. The appointment was made in a bid to remove the stalemate that began at the university three and a half months earlier. He was removed on 30 June 2016 by the chancellor, President Abdul Hamid, without citing any reason. But sources at the Islamic University Teacher Association (IUTA) said the VC was involved in various irregularities and corruption during his tenure. Abdul Hakim Sarkar went on Hajj in 2014 at the invitation of the King of Saudi Arabia.

== Book ==
- Samāja kalyāṇa praśāsana (Bengali: সমাজ কল্যাণ প্রশাসন)

== Death ==
He died on 11 May 2025 at his residence in Sector-14, Dhaka, due to old age complications. He was 75 years old.
