= Shaikh Abdus Salam =

Bangladeshi academic, writer and sports organizer

- শেখ আব্দুস সালাম
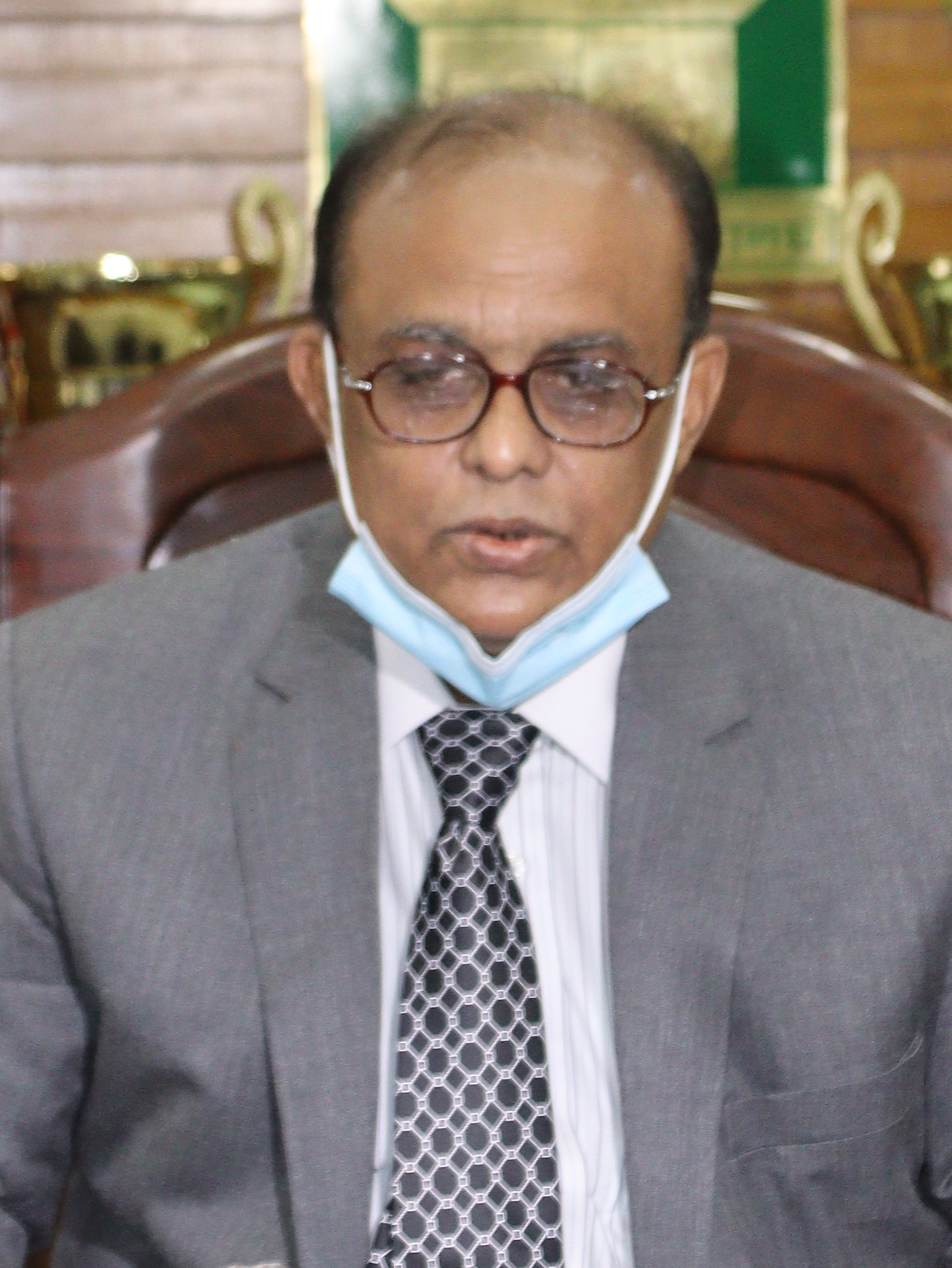
- Salam in 2020

13th Vice-Chancellor of Islamic University, Bangladesh
- In office 29 September 2020 – 10 August 2024
- Preceded by: Rashid Askari
- Succeeded by: Nakib Muhammad Nasrullah

Personal details
- Born: 1955 (age 70–71) Bagerhat District, East Pakistan, Pakistan
- Education: University of Rajshahi; University of Dhaka; University of Pune
- Occupation: Writer, university academic, sports organizer

Shaikh Abdus Salam (born 1955) is a Bangladeshi academic, writer sports organizer and professor. He was the 13th vice chancellor of the Islamic University serving during 2020–2024. He was a professor of University of Dhaka.

== Early life and education ==
Salam was born in 1955 in Rampal upazila of Bagerhat District. He completed his secondary education in 1970. At that time he was ranked 7th in the Jessore board. After completing his higher secondary education in 1972, he was admitted to University of Rajshahi. He graduated in economics from there in 1975 and then obtained his master's degree from University of Dhaka in 1976. Later in 1981 he obtained LLB degree from University of Dhaka. In 1986, he obtained a PhD in mass communication and journalism from the University of Pune, India .

== Career ==
In 1996, Slam started his teaching career by joining Dhaka University . In 1996, he was appointed the director general of the Press Institute of Bangladesh by the Awami League government and held the post until 2001. In 2008 he was appointed chairman of the Department of Mass Communication and Journalism at University of Dhaka. Then in 2009 he was appointed dean of the Faculty of Social Sciences.

Besides, from 2009 to 2011 Salam was a member of the syndicate of Bangladesh University of Business and Technology. He has been a member of the Academic Committee of Bangladesh Open University since 2011.

In a circular issued on 29 September 2020, he was appointed as the vice chancellor of the Islamic University.

Salam has served as the Chairman of the Chess and Carrom Committee of Dhaka University. In addition, he is making significant contributions to the sport of carom and disability at the national level. Salam made a significant contribution to the establishment of the Bangladesh Carrom Federation and served as its president for about 18 years from its inception (1990). He is also one of the founders of the Asian Carrom Confederation and a former member of the Media Committee of the International Carrom Federation. Salam is the President of the Bangladesh Cricket Association for Physically Challenged.

Former members of Bangladesh Chhatra League, who were working as temporary staff at the university, vandalized the officer of the personal secretary to Salam demanding their jobs be made permanent.

== Publications ==
Abdus Salam has written nine books. Notable among these are:

- Bangabandhu and Dhaka University . Dhaka: Ekattar Prakashani. 2017. ISBN 9789849283874 .
- In terms of Western research and science: Al-Quran . Dhaka: Nirnayak. 2018. ISBN 9789849264712 .
- Circulation of history . Dhaka: Nirnayak. 2018. ISBN 9789849264699 .
- Small . Dhaka: Nirnayak. 2018. ISBN 9789849264668 .
- People enlightened in the media and journalism of Bangladesh . Dhaka: Maula Brothers. 5 February 2011. ASIN B0083GTUU4 .
- Mass Media in Bangladesh: Newspaper, Radio and Television (in English). South Asian News Agency. 1 January 1997. ISBN 9843002962 .
