= Islamic University, Bangladesh =

Public University in Bangladesh

- ইসলামী বিশ্ববিদ্যালয়, বাংলাদেশ
- Logo of Islamic University, Bangladesh
- Motto: Enhance Quality of Higher Education and Research
- Type: Public, Co-educational
- Established: 22 November 1979; 46 years ago
- Affiliations: ACU; ISESCO, OIC; Bar Council; PCB; UGC, Bangladesh
- Chancellor: President Mirza Fakhrul Islam Alamgir
- Vice-Chancellor: Professor Dr. A. K. M. Motinur Rahman
- Academic staff: 412+
- Administrative staff: 400+
- Students: 18000+ (Studying undergrad & postgrad)
- Undergraduates: 24933+ (Bachelor degree awarded)
- Postgraduates: 855 (M.Phil. degree awarded), 102 (ongoing); 22581+ (Master degree awarded)(2025)
- Doctoral students: 749 (PhD degree awarded), 125 (ongoing) (2025)
- Location: Kushtia-Jhenaidah, Bangladesh; 23.7212°N 89.1504°E
- Campus: Urban, 175 acres (71 ha)
- Language: English, Bengali, Arabic
- Academic departments: 41
Colours
Green and white
- Mascots: Book and Candle
- Website: iu.ac.bd

Facilities
- Residential halls: 12 (Male=7, Female=5)
- Departments: 41 (18000+ student)
- Faculties: 9
- Institutes: 1
- Transportations: 26 Bus
- Sculptures: 6

University rankings

Regional – Overall
- QS Asia: 1101-1200 (2026)

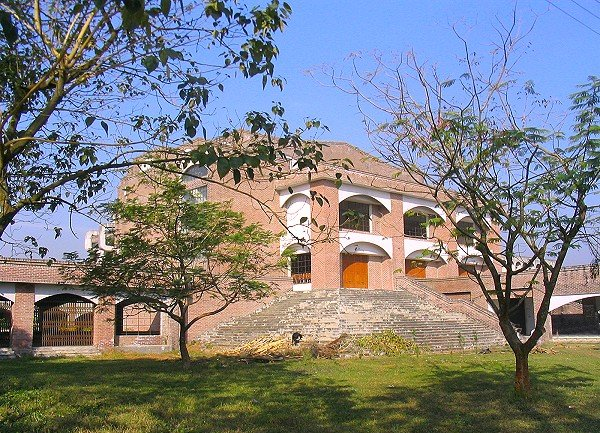
Islamic University Auditorium, Kushtia, Bangladesh

Dept. Created
Year	Dept	Abbreviated name of Department
1986-90	06	AQIS, DIS, AIS, MGT, LAW, ECO
1991-95	06+9	Bangla, ELL, ALL, IHC, PA, AHIS, CSE, EEE, ACCE
1996-00	15+3	ICT, BTGE, ANFT
2001-05		
2006-10	18+4	MATH, AFLS, FAB, STATS
2011-15	22+3	FS, PA, MKT
2016-20	25+9	BME, PHAR, GE, LLM, HRM, THM, DS, SW, FA
2021-25	34+4	MCJ, PESS, CT, ASAN
2026-30	38+3	CR, MP, Aqidah

Islamic University, Bangladesh (legally: Islamic University) (Bengali: ইসলামী বিশ্ববিদ্যালয়, বাংলাদেশ; Arabic: الجامعة الإسلامية بنغلاديش), commonly referred to as Islamic University, Kushtia (abbreviated as IU), is a public PhD granting research university in Kushtia-Jhenaidah, Bangladesh and the largest seat of higher education in the southwestern part of the country.

It is financed by the Government of Bangladesh through University Grants Commission, Bangladesh. On 22 November 1979, the foundation of the Islamic University was set up in Kushtia, and it is operated under the Islamic University Act of 1980. Islamic University began operations on 28 June 1986. It holds the distinction of being the seventh oldest educational institution in the nation, serving as Bangladesh's inaugural university post-independence from Pakistan (formerly West Pakistan) in 1971. It offers undergraduate, graduate, M Phil and PhD degrees.

== History ==
On 1 December 1976, then government announced the establishment of the Islamic University to promote a coordinated approach to Islamic education and general education in the country. Islamic University, Kushtia was founded on 22 November 1979 at Shantidanga-Dulalpur (Kushtia-Jhenidah) by then President of Bangladesh General Ziaur Rahman, based on the recommendation of ‘Islamic University Planning Committee’ on 7 January 1977 headed by M. A. Bari including seven other members.

The Islamic University Act was passed in the National Assembly of Bangladesh on 27 December 1980. The objective of establishing Islamic University is "to provide for instruction in theology and other fields of Islamic Studies and comparative jurisprudence and such other branches of learning at Graduate and Postgraduate level as the University may think fit and make provision for research including Post-Doctorate research and training for the advancement and dissemination of knowledge".

On 1 January 1981, the then Government of Ziaur Rahman appointed A. N. M Momtaz Uddin Choudhury as the first vice-chancellor and the university became operational that year.

As construction of several important buildings began, a presidential decree was issued on 15 May 1982 to shift the university from Shantidanga-Dulalpur (Kushtia-Jhenaidah) to Boardbazar, Gazipur on an area of 50 acres. The construction of an academic building, two residential halls and other necessary infrastructures were completed. Initially two faculties (Faculty of Theology and Islamic Studies, Faculty of Humanities and Social Sciences) with four departments (Al-Quran and Islamic Studies, Dawah and Islamic Studies, Accounting and Information System, Management) were established and 300 students were enrolled in the session of 1985–86.

In 1987, two more departments (Economics, Law) were established.

On 28 December 1988, while the infrastructure development and academic activities were in full swing, the university was again shifted to Shantidanga-Dulalpur (Kushtia-Jhenidah).

In 1991, five more departments — Bengali, English, Arabic, Islamic History, and Public Administration — were established.

In 1992, one more departments (Al Hadith and Islamic Studies) were established.

In 1995, three other departments — of Electrical and Electronic Engineering, Applied Chemistry and Chemical Engineering, and Computer Science and Engineering— were established.

In 1998, three other departments — Information and Communication Technology, Biotechnology and Genetic Engineering, and Applied Nutrition and Food Technology — were established.

In 2007, two more departments Mathematics, and Al-Fiqh and Legal Studies— were established.

In 2009, two more departments Finance and Banking, and Statistics— were established.

In 2015, three more departments — Folklore Studies, Political Science, and Marketing— were opened.

In 2017, 8 more departments— Law and Land Management, Development Studies, Social Welfare, Biomedical Engineering, Pharmacy, Environmental Science & Geography, Human Resources Management, Tourism and Hospitality Management — were established.

In 2019, the department of Fine Arts was added to the Faculty of Arts.

In 2021, the department of Mass Communication & Journalism was added to the Faculty of Social Science.

In 2022, the department of Physical Education and Sports Science was added to the Faculty of Science.

In 2025, the department of Comparative Tafsir, As-Sirah An-Nabawiyyah were added to the Faculty of Theology & Islamic Studies.

Currently, there are 41 departments under 9 faculties i. e. Faculty of Theology & Islamic Studies, Faculty of Islamic & Comparative Religions, Faculty of Arts, Faculty of Social Sciences, Faculty of Law, Faculty of Business Administration, Faculty of Sciences, Faculty of Engineering & Technology, and Faculty of Biological Sciences.

== Administration ==
The chancellor is the ceremonial head of the university who appoints the vice-chancellor. The position is held by the incumbent President of Bangladesh, the Head of State of Bangladesh. The vice-chancellor is the executive head of the university.

Chancellor	President Mirza Fakhrul Islam Alamgir
Vice-chancellor	Professor Dr. A. K. M. Motinur Rahman
Pro vice-chancellor	Professor Dr. M. Yeaqub Ali
Treasurer	Professor Dr. Md. Jahangir Alam
Registrar	Professor Dr. Md. Manjurul Haque (In charge)
Proctor	Professor Dr. Md. Shahinuzzaman

List of vice-chancellors

1. A. N. M Momtaz Uddin (9 February 1979 to 27 December 1988)
2. Muhammad Sirazul Islam (28 December 1988 – 17 June 1991)
3. Muhammad Abdul Hamid (18 June 1991 – 21 March 1995)
4. Muhammad Enam-Ul Haque (9 May 1995 – 2 September 1997)
5. Qaisuddin (3 September 1997 – 19 October 2000)
6. Muhammad Lutfar Rahman (20 October 2000 – 3 November 2001)
7. Muhammad Mustafizur Rahman (10 December 2001 – 2 April 2004)
8. M. Rafiqul Islam (3 April 2004 – 10 July 2006)
9. Foyez Muhammad Sirazul Haque (10 August 2006 – 8 March 2009)
10. M. Alauddin (9 March 2009 – 27 December 2012)
11. Abdul Hakim Sarkar (27 December 2012 – 30 June 2016)
12. Md. Harun-Ur-Rashid Askari (21 August 2016 – 20 August 2020)
13. Shaikh Abdus Salam (30 September 2020 – 10 August 2024).
14. Nakib Muhammad Nasrullah (23 September 2024 – 14 May 2026).
15. Professor A K M Motinur Rahman (15 May 2026 – Present)

List of pro vice-chancellors

1. Kamal Uddin (3 March 2009 – January 2013)
2. M. Shahinoor Rahman (20 February 2013 – 19 February 2017)
3. M. Shahinoor Rahman (23 February 2017 – 22 February 2021)
4. Mahbubur Rahman (30 June 2021 – 10 August 2024)
5. M. Yeaqub Ali (2 December 2024 – Present)

== Notable persons ==
=== Faculty ===
- A. N. M Momtaz Uddin Choudhury, first Vice Chancellor and project director of Islamic University, Bangladesh
- Maimul Ahsan Khan scholar of jurisprudence and comparative law and former professor of IU
- Khandaker Abdullah Jahangir, Islamic scholar and former professor of IU
- Abubakar Muhammad Zakaria, media personality, professor, writer
- Abul Ahsan Chowdhury, writer, researcher and former professor, Department of Bengali, IU
- Foyez Muhammad Sirazul Haque, academic and ex-vice chancellor, IU
- Harun-Ur-Rashid Askari, Bengali-English writer, fictionist, academic, media personality and the 12th vice chancellor, IU
- M. Alauddin, academic, chemist and ex-vice chancellor, IU
- Shamsuzzaman Khan, ex-director general of Bangla Academy and Bangabandhu Chair Professor, IU
- A B M Shawkat Ali, writer, physicist and ex-assistant professor of the Department of CSE, IU
- Mohammad Yusuf Siddiq, historian, epigraphist, researcher, professor and author

=== Alumni ===
- Md. Shahjahan Alam Shaju, Bangladeshi politician and former member of parliament, general secretary of Swadhinata Shikshak Parishad
- Mohammad Ali Moni, clinical bioinformatics scientist.
- Shihab Shaheen, film director, producer and screenwriter.
- Tapan Bagchi, writer, folklore researcher
- Fahima Khatun, cricketer on the Bangladesh women's national cricket team.
- Mehedi Hasan Royal, forward for the Bangladesh national football team.
- Mohammad Shamsuddin, Bangladeshi sprinter, 2004 Summer Olympics.
- Sohrab Uddin, Bangladesh Nationalist Party member of parliament.
- Amir Hamza (Mufti), Bangladeshi Islamic preacher, da'i, and politician

== Academics ==
Faculties:

- Faculty of Theology and Islamic Studies
- Faculty of Islamic and Comparative Religion
- Faculty of Engineering and Technology
- Faculty of Biological Sciences
- Faculty of Sciences
- Faculty of Business Administration
- Faculty of Arts
- Faculty of Social Sciences
- Faculty of Law

Institutes:

- Institute of Islamic Education and Research (IIER)
- Institute of Modern Languages (proposed)
- Institute of Education and Research (Proposed)

=== Faculties and departments ===
At present the university offers academic programs through its 41 departments under 9 faculties and one self-contained Institute of Islamic Education and Research (IIER). The government-approved recent organogram of the university sets out to operate 59 departments and 3 self-contained Institutes. The faculty-wise distribution of departments is as follows:

=== Faculty of Theology and Islamic Studies ===
Degree awarded: BTIS (Hons), MTIS, MPhil & PhD.

There are Four departments under this faculty and the medium of instructions are Arabic, English & Bengali based on subjects, which are:

No	Name of the department	Medium of instruction and exam.	Year of establishment	Seats
01	Al-Quran and Islamic Studies (AQIS)	Arabic, English, Bengali	1986	80
02	Al-Hadith and Islamic Studies (AHIS)	Arabic, English, Bengali	1992	80
03	Comparative Tafsir (CT)	Arabic, English, Bengali	2025	80
04	As-Sirah An-Nabawiyyah (ASN)	Arabic, English, Bengali	2025	80

=== Faculty of Islam and Comparative Religion ===
Degree awarded: BICR (Hons), MICR, MPhil & PhD.

There are Four departments under this faculty and the medium of instructions are Arabic, English & Bengali based on subjects, which are:

No	Name of the department	Medium of instruction and exam.	Year of establishment	Seats
01	Dawah and Islamic Studies (DIS)	Arabic, English, Bengali	1986	80
02	Comparative Religion (CR)	Arabic, English, Bengal		
03	Muslim Philosophy (MP)	Arabic, English, Bengali		
04	Aqidah and Ideology (AI)	Arabic, English, Bengal		

=== Faculty of Engineering and Technology ===
Islamic University offers various Engineering Programs in different branches of engineering sciences in Undergraduate (Bachelor of Science in engineering; B.Sc. Engg.) and Graduate level (Master of Science in engineering; M.Sc. Engg).

Degree Awarded: B.Sc (Engg), M.Sc (Engg/M.Engg), M.Phil & PhD.

There are five departments including applied/engineering sciences under this faculty and the medium of instruction & examination is English, which are:

No	Name of the department	Medium of instruction and exam.	Year of establishment	Seats
01	Electrical and Electronic Engineering (EEE)	English	1995	50
02	Computer Science and Engineering (CSE)	English	1995	50
03	Applied Chemistry and Chemical Engineering (ACCE)	English	1995	50
04	Information and Communication Technology (ICT)	English	1998	50
05	Biomedical Engineering (BME)	English	2017	50

=== Faculty of Biological Sciences ===
Degree Awarded: B.Pharm, M.Pharm., B.Sc (Hons.), M.Sc & PhD.

There are three departments including applied/biological sciences under this faculty and the medium of instruction & examination is English, which are:

No	Name of the department	Medium of instruction and exam.	Year of establishment	Seats
01	Biotechnology and Genetic Engineering (BTGE)	English	1998	50
02	Applied Nutrition and Food Technology (ANFT)	English	1998	50
03	Pharmacy (PHAR)	English	2017	50

=== Faculty of Sciences ===
Degree Awarded: B.Sc (Hons.), M.Sc, M.Phil & PhD.

There are four departments including physical/mathematical sciences under this faculty and the medium of instruction & examination is English, which are:

No	Name of the department	Medium of instruction and exam.	Year of establishment	Seats
01	Mathematics (MATH)	English	2007	50
02	Statistics & Data Science (SDS)	English	2009	50
03	Environmental Science & Geography (GSE)	English	2017	50
04	Physical Education and Sports Science (PESS)	English	2022	30

=== Faculty of Business Administration ===
Degree Awarded: BBA, MBA, M.Phil & PhD.

There are six departments under this faculty and the medium of instruction & examination is English, which are:

No	Name of the department	Medium of instruction and exam.	Year of establishment	Seats
01	Accounting and Information Systems (AIS)	English	1986	75
02	Management (MGT)	English	1986	75
03	Finance and Banking (FAB)	English	2009	75
04	Marketing (MKT)	English	2015	75
05	Human Resources Management (HRM)	English	2017	75
06	Tourism and Hospitality Management (THM)	English	2017	75

=== Faculty of Arts ===
Degree Awarded: B.A (Hons), M.A, M.Phil & PhD.

There are five departments under this faculty and the medium of instructions are English, Bengali & Arabic based on each department individually, which are:

No	Name of the department	Medium of instruction and exam.	Year of establishment	Seats
01	Arabic Language and Literature (ALL)	Arabic, English, Bengali	1991	90
02	Bengali	Bengali, English	1991	90
03	English	English	1991	100
04	Islamic History and Culture (IHC)	Bengali, English	1991	90
05	Fine Arts (FA)	English, Bengali	2019	45

=== Faculty of Social Sciences ===
Degree Awarded: B.S.S (Hons), M.S.S, M.Phil & PhD.

There are seven departments under this faculty and the medium of instructions are English based on each department, which are:

No	Name of the department	Medium of instruction and exam.	Year of establishment	Seats
01	Economics (ECO)	English	1989	80
02	Public Administration (PA)	English	1991	75
03	Political Science (PS)	English	2015	75
04	Folklore & Social Studies(FSS)	Bengali, English	2015	80
05	Development Studies (DS)	English	2017	75
06	Social Welfare (SW)	English	2017	75
07	Communication and Multimedia Journalism (CMJ)	English	2021	50

=== Faculty of Law ===
Degree Awarded: LLB, LLM, M.Phil & PhD.

There are three departments under this faculty and the medium of instructions are English, Bengali & Arabic based on each department individually.

No	Name of the department	Medium of instruction and exam.	Year of establishment	Seats
01	Law	English, Bengali	1990	80
02	Al-Fiqh and Law (AFL)	English, Arabic, Bengali	2007	80
03	Law and Land Administration (LLA)	English, Bengali	2017	80

=== Academic buildings ===
There are academic buildings in IU to operate academic activities of 41 departments, which are:

No	Academic Building Name	No. of Floors
01	Islamic Faculty Building	Four-Storeys
02	Applied Science and Technology Building	Four-Storeys
03	Ibn Sina Science Building	Five-Storeys
04	Faculty of Business Administration Building	Six-Storeys
05	Mir Mosharraf Hossain Academic Building	Four-Storeys
06	Rabindra-Nazrul Arts Building	Five-Storeys
07	Institute of Islamic Education and Research (IIER) Building	Two-Storeys
08	Kobi Golam Mostofa Academic Building	Ten-Storeys

=== Institutes ===
Presently, IU has one institute, Institute of Islamic Education and Research (IIER). B.Ed., M.Ed., Diploma, Diploma in Library and Information Science, Junior Diploma in Chinese Language programs are conducted by this institute. The IIER of the Islamic University conducts research, publishes journals, and awards various degrees and certificates. The institute has an IIER Research Journal Publication. Journals are usually published from here in Bengali, English, and Arabic languages. Also under this institute are the Teachers Training Institute, Translation and Publication Bureau, Institute of Middle Eastern Studies and Muslim World Language Education, and IU School and College. Various courses and degrees are awarded under these institutions.

No	Name of the Institute
01	Institute of Islamic Education and Research (IIER) [bn]
02	Institute of Modern Languages (proposed)
03	Institute of Education and Research (Proposed)

=== Convocations ===
Only four convocations have been organized in the history of the Islamic University Kushtia. The first convocation was held on 27 April 1993, the second on 5 December 1999, the third on 28 March 2002 and the fourth on 7 January 2018. In the last convocation in 2018, about 9,500 undergraduate, MPhil and PhD degree holders received their original certificates.

=== Collaboration and MoU ===
- Northwestern University Pritzker School of Law, United States (MoU)
- Edith Cowan University, Australia (to collaborate on academic, research activities)
- University of Tampere, Finland (MoU with IU Public Administration Department)
- Nagasaki University, Japan (Academic Cooperation)
- Okayama University, Japan
- Okayama University of Science, Japan
- Kangwon National University, South Korea (International collaboration of Biological Research)
- Chonbuk National University, South Korea (Research Cooperation)
- Yunnan University, China
- Confucius Institute, China (Establishment of the Confucius Institute Chinese Teaching Site)
- Kafkas University, Turkey
- Cankiri Karatekin University, Turkey
- Yıldız Technical University, Turkey(MoU)
- Sultan Sharif Ali Islamic University, Brunei Darussalam (MoU)
- Visva-Bharati University, India

== Enrollment ==
=== Undergraduate (Bachelor's) ===
Before starting every academic session, applications for admission into undergraduate studies are asked by IU authority and prepares detailed prospectus on the admission process including qualifications criteria i.e. cumulative grade points average of Secondary level (S.S.C or equivalent to Grade-10), Higher Secondary level (H.S.C or equivalent to Grade-12), Diploma, A level, O level etc. The prospectus also include units’ distribution on different subjects under different faculties, seat capacity, examinations fee and particular date to be held the examinations. The Undergraduate admission test is one of the competitive examinations in Bangladesh.

After completion of twelve years of studies or higher secondary level (H.S.C or equivalent to Grade-12) education, a student can submit her or his application for undergraduate admission if he/she fulfills the minimum requirements. There are 8 units (A to H) for admission test; each unit has its unique questions patterns.i.e. applicants are required to answer questions on physics, mathematics, chemistry, biology, English etc. based on the unit's subjects type to be admitted under Faculty of Applied Science and Technology.

For the faculty of Business Administrations, applicants are required to answer questions on business studies, accounting, general knowledge, and mathematics. For the Faculty of Law and Shariah, applicants are required to answer questions on English, Bengali, and general knowledge. For the Faculty of Humanities and Social Sciences, applicants are required to answer questions on English, Bengali, and general Knowledge. For the Faculty of Theology and Islamic Studies, applicants are required to answer questions on Arabic, Al-Quran, Al-Hadith, Dawah & Islamic studies, Al-Fiqh, Islamic history, English, Bengali, and general knowledge.

=== Graduate (Master's) ===
The Islamic University Kushtia offers Master's or postgraduate programs in various faculties and departments. The university's Master's programs usually include courses of one or two years duration and bachelor's degree holders can be admitted through an admission test. These programs include Master of Science (M.Sc.), Master of Arts (MA), Master of Pharmacy (M.Pharm.), Master of Theology and Islamic Studies (MTIS), Master of Business Administration (MBA), Master of Social Science (MSS), Master of Law (LL.M) and Master of Education (M.Ed.). The admission and curriculum of each program are conducted as per the university's rules. To be admitted to the Master's program, one usually has to pass a written examination and/or an oral interview organized by the university's Central Admission Committee and acquire the necessary qualifications.

However, in addition to the regular Master's courses, a Professional Master's course is also conducted here, which is locally called an evening master's degree. This degree is completed by conducting classes on specific days of the week in almost every department, especially on holidays.

=== Graduate research (M.Phil or Ph.D) ===
Before starting every academic session, applications for admission into postgraduate studies i.e. M.Phil. or Ph.D. are asked by IU authority and prepares details prospectus on the admission process including qualifications criteria i.e. cumulative grade points average of Secondary level (S.S.C or equivalent to Grade-10), Higher Secondary level (H.S.C or equivalent to Grade-12), Diploma, A level, O level, percentage of marks in the bachelor studies, and number of publications or research papers etc.

=== Graduate diploma ===
IU offers a 1-year diploma in Library and Information Science and a 1-year Junior Diploma in Chinese Language under Institute of Islamic Education and Research (IIRR). This diploma course is mainly conducted under the Islamic Education and Research Institute of IU. Every year, several hundred students complete the diploma course from the Islamic University Kushtia. Notable among the topics on which courses are being offered are:

Some Diploma Course
Degree	Name of course	Time Span	Seats
Post Graduate Diploma	Library and Information Science	12 Months, 6 Months	80
Diploma and Junior Diploma Course	Chinese Language	12 Months, 6 Months	80
Diploma and Junior Diploma Course	English Langusge	12 Months, 6 Months	80
Diploma and Junior Diploma Course	Arabic Language	12 Months, 6 Months	80
Junior Diploma Course	Korean Language	6 Months	80
Junior Diploma Course	Japanese Language	6 Months	80

== Magazines, journals and research bulletins ==
- Journal of Islamic University (IU Journal)
- Journal of the Faculty of Applied Science and Technology
- Journal of the Faculty of Business Administration
- Islamic University Studies
- Swapno literary magazine
- "Mukta Bangla" literary magazine

== Innovations and achievements ==
- 17 teachers from different faculties of IU have been ranked among world's best scientists (Researchers) in the AD Scientific index published in October 2021.
- The Intelligent Smart and Versatile Home Security System was designed by Niaz Mustakim, an M.Sc. student of the Electrical and Electronic Engineering (EEE) Department. It can be used for everyday tasks like opening and closing doors, switching lights and air-conditioning on and off, as well as warning of dangers such as gas leaks and fire.
- A robot was invented by ASM Shamim Hasan, an M.Sc. student of the Electrical and Electronic Engineering (EEE) Department. The device is capable of collecting information from spaces which are usually out of the reach of humans.
- IU is four times champions in football, two times in basketball and fourteen times in volleyball at the Bangladesh inter-universities sports competition. Moreover, some IU students played in the Asian games and Olympic games for the Bangladesh National Team and acquired prizes at that competition.
- Evening primrose (a special species of sunflower, a flower of winter-prone country) is cultivated first time in the climate of Bangladesh by the researchers of the Department of Biotechnology and Genetic Engineering (BTGE). After trying for almost a year and a half under the leadership of Jahangir Alam, the researchers have been able to cultivate this flower in the country's climate through tissue culture. The other members of the research team is Anwarul Haque Swapon, Mostafa Shakil, Jubayer Hussain, Sadrul Hasan Chowdhury, Zahurul Islam, Zulkar Nain and others.

== Facilities ==
=== Libraries ===
The University Library, housed in a separate four-storey building, is one of the biggest in Bangladesh. It is named 'Khademul Haramain Badshah Fahd bin Abdul Aziz Central Library '. There are thousands of books and volumes, including bound volumes of periodicals. In addition, It subscribes to hundred of foreign journals. It has an advanced level E-Library Teachers, students and researchers are able to read all journals, books research papers and articles, by using the E-Library facilities.

=== Computer Centre ===
Islamic University Computer Centre was established in order to accelerating research facilities for faculty, staff and students. Present Director of the Computer Centre is Paresh Chandra Barman. The Information and Communications Technology (ICT) CELL is to deliver technology services to support the Teaching, Learning, Research and Administrative goals of the university, managed by the Computer Centre.

=== Transportation ===
The university runs its own regular bus services to and from the Kushtia and Jhenidah district towns. Although, it has a total of 47 Bus to ensure transportation facilities of the students, teacher officers and support staff residing inside and outside of the campus, but it is not adequate. In addition, VC, Pro-VC and Treasurer use university Car for their transportation facilities.

- 16 university's own bus (one double-decker bus for students)
- 31 hired buses (two double-decker buses for students)
- 2 university's own ambulance
- 4 university's own minibus

=== Health services ===
Health services are provided by a medical center at the campus. The medical center is situated near the Mir Mosharraf Hossain Academic Building and Mofiz Lake. The medical center offers free medical service and free pathological examinations to students, teachers and staffs of the university and also family members of the teachers and staffs. The Centre provides service round the clock, seven days a week, with 11 doctors working in different shifts. The centre also has dental unit, eye unit, x-ray department and two ambulances. The centre has in its premises arrangement for 05 bed accommodation so that students suffering from such contagious diseases as chickenpox or mumps may be taken care of in isolation.

=== Cafeteria ===
There is a central cafeteria, situated within the central auditorium's south side. Moreover, every faculty building, library, residential halls have cafeterias on the campus.

=== University School & College ===
Islamic University has a 'Laboratory School & College' of secondary level and higher secondary level education inside the campus for children. The school & college also receives general students from outside of the campus.

== Student life ==
=== Student body ===
The university has about 16,000 regular students. There are eight residential halls for students, including four of 2000 seats for male and three of 1500 seats for female students. This capacity is not enough and students usually live in two adjacent cities, Kushtia and Jheniadah.

=== Halls of residence ===
The university has twelve residential halls for students, seven for males and five for females. They are:

Student's residence of Islamic University, Bangladesh
No	Hall Name		Naming by	Estab.	Students seats	
01	Male	Saddam Hussein Hall	Saddam Hussein	1995	400	3764
02	Male	Shahid Ziaur Rahman Hall	Ziaur Rahman	1995	400	3764
03	Male	Shah Azizur Rahman Hall	Shah Azizur Rahman	5 Dec 1999	404	3764
04	Male	Lalon Shah Hall	Lalon Shah	31 May 2005	300	3764
05	Male	Shahid Anas Hall	Shahid Anas [bn]	7 Jan 2018	260	3764
06	Male	Abrar Fahad Hall	Abrar Fahad	2026	1000	3764
07	Male	New Hall		2026	1000	3764
08	Female	Khaleda Zia Hall	Khaleda Zia	29 Aug 1995	721	3925
09	Female	Ummul Muminin Ayesha Siddiqa Hall	Aisha	1999	600	3925
10	Female	July-36 Hall	July 36	2015	604	3925
11	Female	New Hall		2026	1000	3925
12	Female	New Hall		2026	1000	3925
						Total: 7689

=== Islamic University Theatre ===
Islamic University Theatre (IUT) was established in 1991 by students. On 21 October 2021, IU theatre celebrated its 30th birth anniversary. Every now and then drama is staged at the Student Teacher Cultural Centre.

=== International Student Affairs & Admission Cell (ISAC) ===
IU also welcomes foreign students every year for undergraduate, graduate and postgraduate research programs MPhil, PhD, enrollment process is conducted by International Student Affairs & Admission Cell (ISAC) at IU. Students can be admitted at IU from SAARC countries, South Asian Countries Middle East countries specially from Nepal, India, Pakistan, Sri Lanka, Maldives, Bhutan, Somalia, Cambodia, Afghanistan and Indonesia.

== Sports ==
IU has two large playgrounds, one is for cricket and another for football. These two are used as venue of annual athletics competition of the university as well as cricket, football, and hockey competitions. Moreover, these two venues are very popular for inter-university football and cricket competition. Students can access the facility all year round. IU has tennis court beside the gymnasium building. It also has a gymnasium cum indoor stadium near the halls of residence where students can do gymnastics and play basketball, badminton during leisure, and this gymnasium is used almost every year for inter-university basketball, badminton competition. Also this university has won the inter-university football competition five times into Bangladesh.

Tamanna Khatun student of IU, who won a gold medal in the Youth World Hockey Championship held in South Africa in 2006. Mohammad Shamsuddin competed in the 100 meters at the 2004 Athens Olympics and Abdullah al hil Kafi, a famous athlete, who represented Bangladesh in South Korean Sports in 2003. Fahima Khatun and Mehedi Hasan Royal are national woman cricket and man football team member.

== Ranking ==
University rankings

Global – Overall
- QS World: 4043 (2024)
- Scimago Global: 2025 (2024)
- URAP World: 2998 (2024)

Regional – Overall
- QS Asia: 1640 (2024)

=== International ranking ===
In Edition 2021 according to Webometrics university ranking website, Islamic University, Bangladesh ranked 4218th out of 30,000 universities worldwide. In 2019-20 session Islamic University was ranked 9321th position into worldwide 13,800 universities by unirank.org website. Another side the edurank.org website ranks the Islamic University, Bangladesh 6209th position out of 16,954 universities. Russian university ranking website unipage.net ranks Islamic University, Bangladesh 4355th position out of 28,000 universities worldwide in 2020.

=== National ranking ===
In 2021 by Webometrics university ranking website, Islamic University, Bangladesh came 25th out of Bangladeshi public-private universities. According to unirank.org website Islamic University placed 42nd among Bangladeshi universities. Russian university ranking website unipage.net ranks Islamic University, 16th position out of 128 Bangladesh universities in 2020. The edurank.org website ranks the Islamic University, Bangladesh 23rd position among 129 universities of Bangladesh.

== Incidents ==
=== Mysterious Death of Sajid Abdullah ===
In July 2025, the body of Sajid Abdullah, a student of the Al-Quran and Islamic Studies department, was found in a pond adjacent to Shah Azizur Rahman Hall. The incident sparked widespread protests from students, who alleged negligence by the university administration and demanded a transparent investigation.

=== 2023 Ragging incident ===
In February 2023, a first-year student, Fulpori Khatun, was subjected to severe physical and psychological abuse by a group of senior students at the Desh Ratna Sheikh Hasina Hall. The perpetrators were identified as leaders and activists of the Bangladesh Chhatra League (BCL). The incident, which involved physical torture, forced stripping, and video recording of the victim, sparked nationwide condemnation and protests from academics and human rights organizations.

Following a writ petition, the High Court Division of the Supreme Court of Bangladesh intervened, ordering an independent investigation. The court termed the incident "alarming" and directed the university administration to ensure campus safety. Based on the judicial inquiry and university probe, five students—including the BCL unit vice-president Sanjida Chowdhury Antora—were permanently expelled from the university in August 2023. The case is cited as a significant legal precedent regarding anti-ragging enforcement in Bangladeshi higher education.

=== 2014 Student deaths and protests at IU ===
2014 IUB student death and protests refers to the student demonstrations and bus arson incidents that took place at the Islamic University, Kushtia campus following the death of a student named Tawhidur Rahman Titu in a bus accident on campus. This incident became one of the most widely discussed campus-based events in the university's history.On 30 November 2014, following Titu's death from being run over by a bus inside the campus, approximately 30 buses were set on fire and 8–10 buses were vandalized by protesting students.In response, the Islamic University was declared closed indefinitely, and remained shut for more than four months.Among the universities in Bangladesh, this became one of the longest closures due to a campus accident.At that time, the incident became a widely discussed and influential event across the country.

=== Murder of Asma Sadia Runa ===
Asma Sadia Runa was a Bangladeshi academic who was murdered in her office at the Islamic University, Bangladesh in March 2026. The accused killer, who was a supporting staff, tried to commit suicide but survived. Police investigation revealed a web of conspiracy for planning the murder that involved two of her colleagues, Shyam Sundar Sarkar and Habibur Rahman, and the university's officer Biswajit Kumar Biswas. The three conspirators were suspended by the university on the third day. A lack of action on the alleged perpetrator led to the university students and Runa's family holding a road-block protest in Kushtia.

==== Background ====
Runa, 40 years of age, was an assistant professor in the Department of Social Works at the Islamic University, Bangladesh. Her research focussed on social interactions issues related to use of social media. She was appointed chair of the department in September 2024. Runa's husband, Muhammad Imtiaz Sultan, is a temporary teacher at Kushtia Polytechnic Institute. The couple has three daughters and one son.

The problem started when her predecessor, Shyam Sundar Sarkar, refused to hand over the financial documents and funds. The university's Assistant Registrar, Bishwajit Kumar Biswas, informed Runa that she had no need to acquire the financial accounts and had to simply approve documents put before her. Runa protested by saying that financial matters should be made transparent and that she stood against any misuse of funds.

Runa's husband later recalled that Runa had found records of Sarkar, Biswas and Khandakar (or Khondakar) Fazlur (or Fazlu) Rahman embezzled and misused the departmental funds soon after she took up the chair. Fazlur Rahman was a temporary office assistant employed using the departmental funds since 2018. He was paid on daily basis for his services and since 5 August 2024, just before Runa became the chair, he was never paid. Runa had applied to the university for Fazlur's salary as the departmental fund was used up. After hearing Runa's plan, Fazlur Rahman believed that he would now be paid a double salary, from the department and from the university. Runa explained to him that the salary would be only from the university.

In protest, Fazlur Rahman began to take up aggressive behaviour and often verbally abuse Runa, even in the presence of other faculty members. One time Fazlur Rahman told Runa, "You cannot act like a saint and leave the departments money untouched." When Fazlur Rahman received a warning letter for misbehaviour and non-cooperation, he apologised to Runa but did stop his actions, particularly as he was provoked by Sarkar and Biswas. Runa told Roksana Mili, Dean of the Faculty of Social Sciences, the issue following which departmental meetings were held. Fazlur Rahman was removed from the department "for violating departmental discipline and failing to cooperate with the department chair." He was transferred to the Department of Political Science on 18 February 2026.

Habibur Rahman, another faculty member in Runa's department, fiercely opposed to the action against Rahman and demanded Runa to cancel the transfer. On 18 February 2026, Biswas was also removed from his responsibility on the university finances, and posted to dormitory facility, the Ummul Mu'minin Ayesha Siddiqa Hall. According to Sultan, Biswas, Sarkar, Habibur Rahman and Fazlur Rahman started to plot murder of Runa.

==== Incident ====
On 4 March 2026, the Islamic University, Bangladesh was organising a Muslim meal time (iftar) the Department of Social Works. The hall was adjacent to Runa's office. Just before the programme started, at the around 3:30 to 4 p.m., Fazlur Rahman entered Runa's office and the two had fiery arguments. Fazlur Rahman suddenly attacked Runa. Although some reported that security personnel, teachers and students heard screams, student leaders who organised the meal time function gave a detail report that no one other than Fazlur Rahman and Runa was in and around the department.

The students went to Runa's office to discuss on the programme expenditure at 4:10 p.m. As they found the office door locked from the inside, they broke the door to find Runa lying on the floor in her blood. Fazlur Rahman was on the corner and as soon as he saw the students he tried to slit his throat. The two were rushed to Kushtia General Hospital. Hasan Imam, residential medical officer of the hospital, pronounced Runa's dead at 6 p.m. and the cause of death as stabbing at the throat.

At the hospital, Fazlur Rahman confessed that he killed Runa because of his transfer and unpaid salary. An autopsy was performed in the forenoon of 5 March and the report indicated 20 stab wounds on Runa's chest, abdomen, hands, and legs. Runa's funeral was held that afternoon and was interred at the central municipal graveyard in Kushtia.

==== Aftermath ====
On 6 March 2026, the police arrested Fazlur Rahman while still at the intensive care unit of the hospital. Fazlur Rahman made a written statement before the police that his motive was a revenge for his transfer and discontinuation of his salary. The same day, Runa's husband, Sultan, submitted a formal police case against Biswas, Sarkar, and Habibur Rahman. The three were suspended by the Islamic University, Bangladesh from their respective positions on 7 March, under the Code of Criminal Procedure Section 154.

No criminal action was taken against Biswas, Sarkar, Habibur Rahman. On 6 March, teachers and students of the Department of Social Work held a protest at the university by forming a human chain. On 9 March, the four children of Runa, supported by relatives and friend made a rally demanding swift justice. On 3 April, a month of lack of action on the alleged perpetrator led to the university students holding a road-block protest in Kushtia. On 15 April, students organised a protest march.

In March 2026, the Islamic University instituted a five-member committee to investigate the case. The university's 274th syndicate meeting held on 29 June 2026 discussed the investigation found the report inadequate and created a high-power committee for further investigation consisting of four senior officers headed by pro-vice-chancellor M Yeaqub Ali. On 22 July 2026, Islamic University Registrar Monjurul Haque issued a petition letter to all the university departments for donating a one-day salary to support Runa's family. Even after six months, there was no crimincal charge sheet against any one, including Fazlur Rahman. On 25 September 2026, Fazlur Rahman declared that he withdrew his confession and that he was innocent of the crime.

== Photo gallery ==
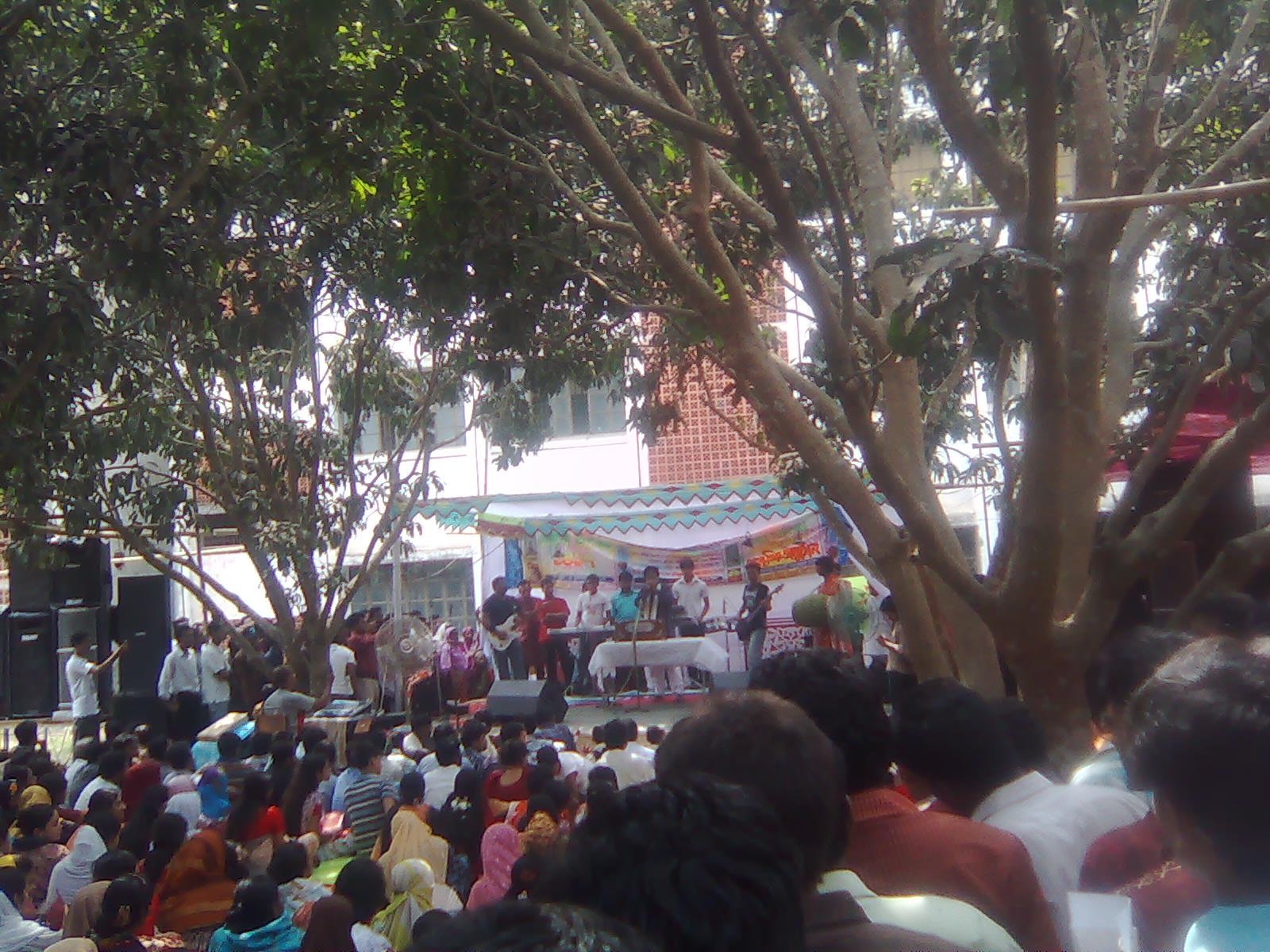
Cultural function at Aam Chottor (mango garden)

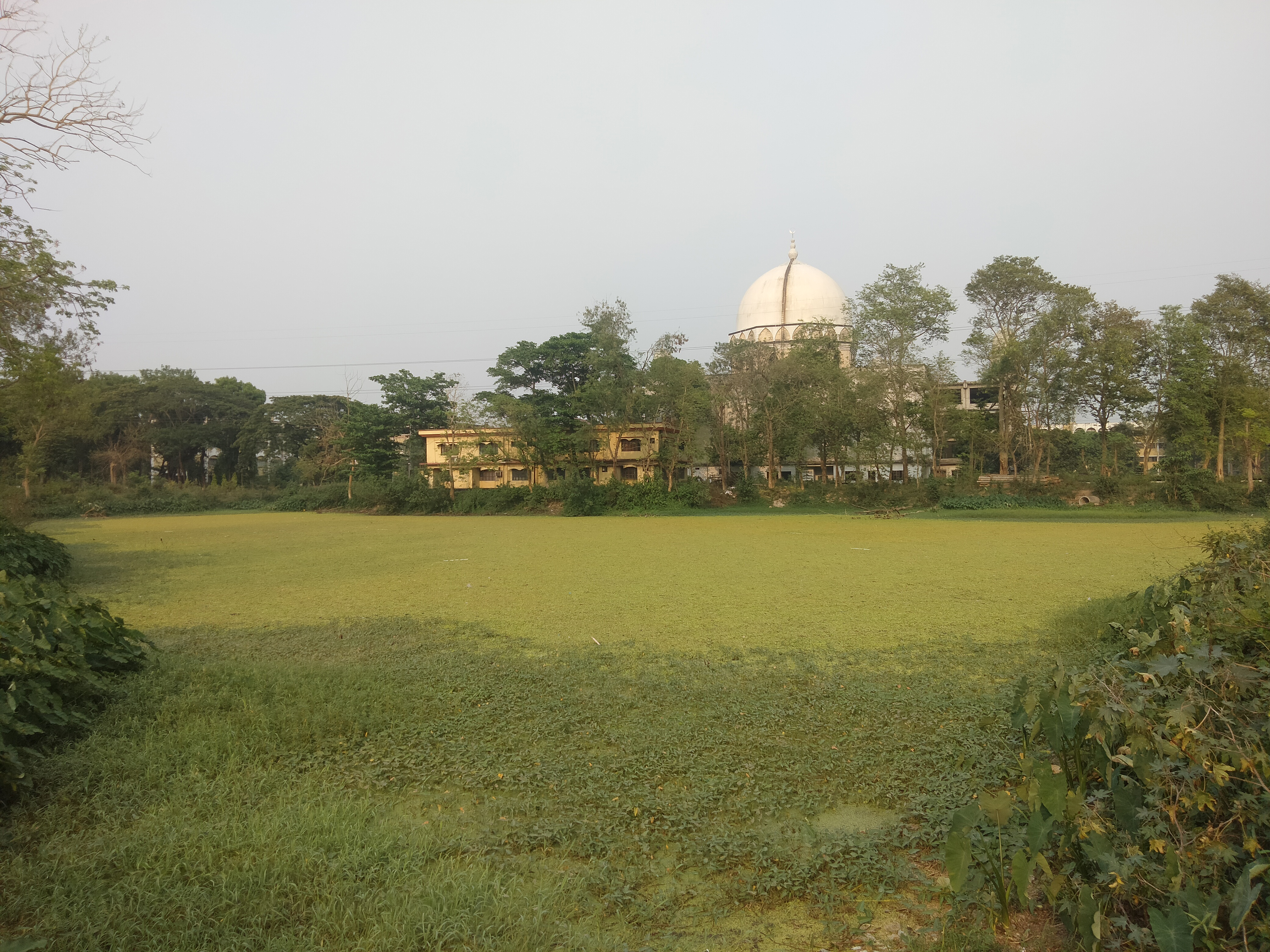
IU Central Mosque

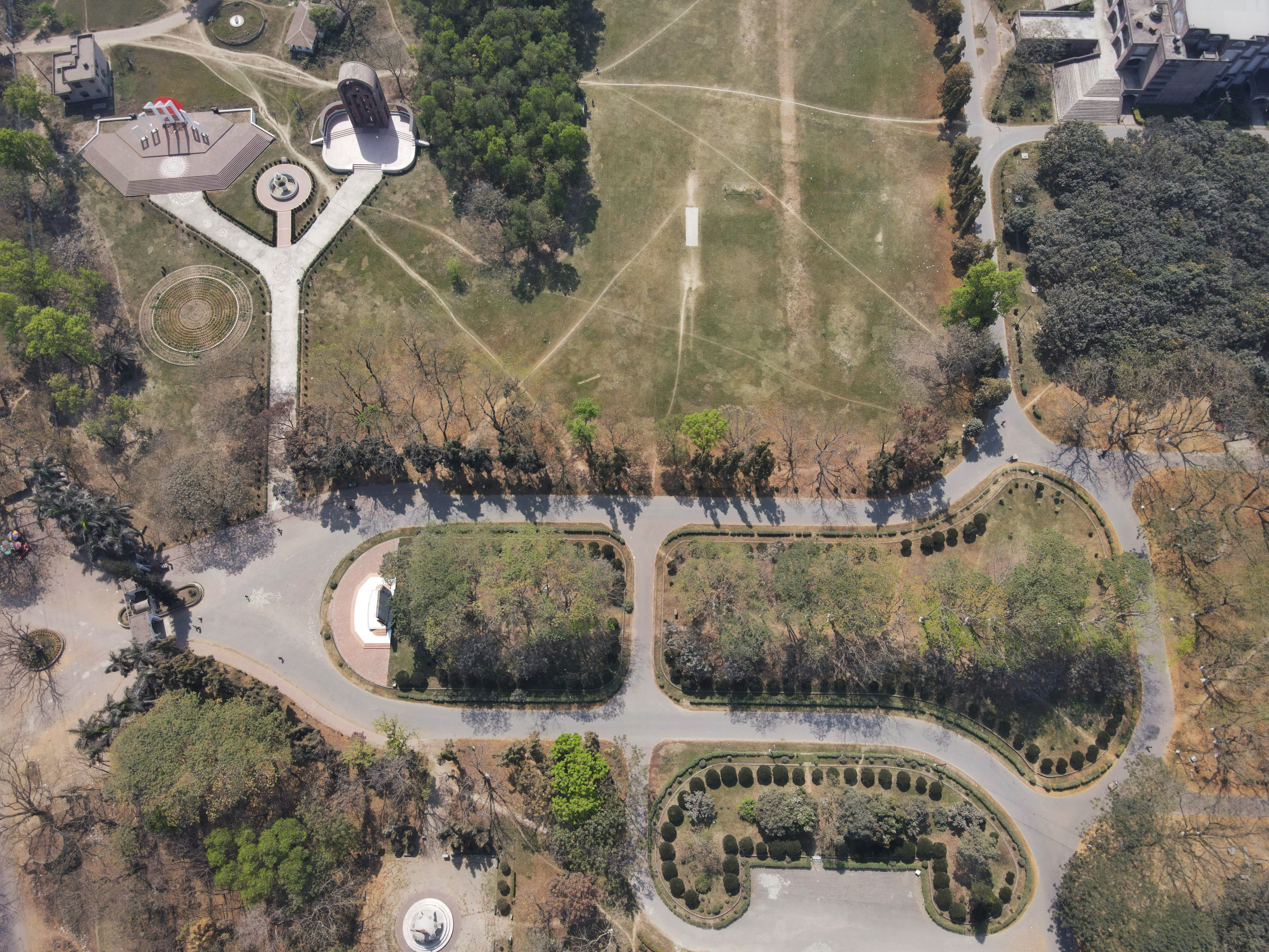
Princess Diana Courtyard (named after the late Diana, Princess of Wales)

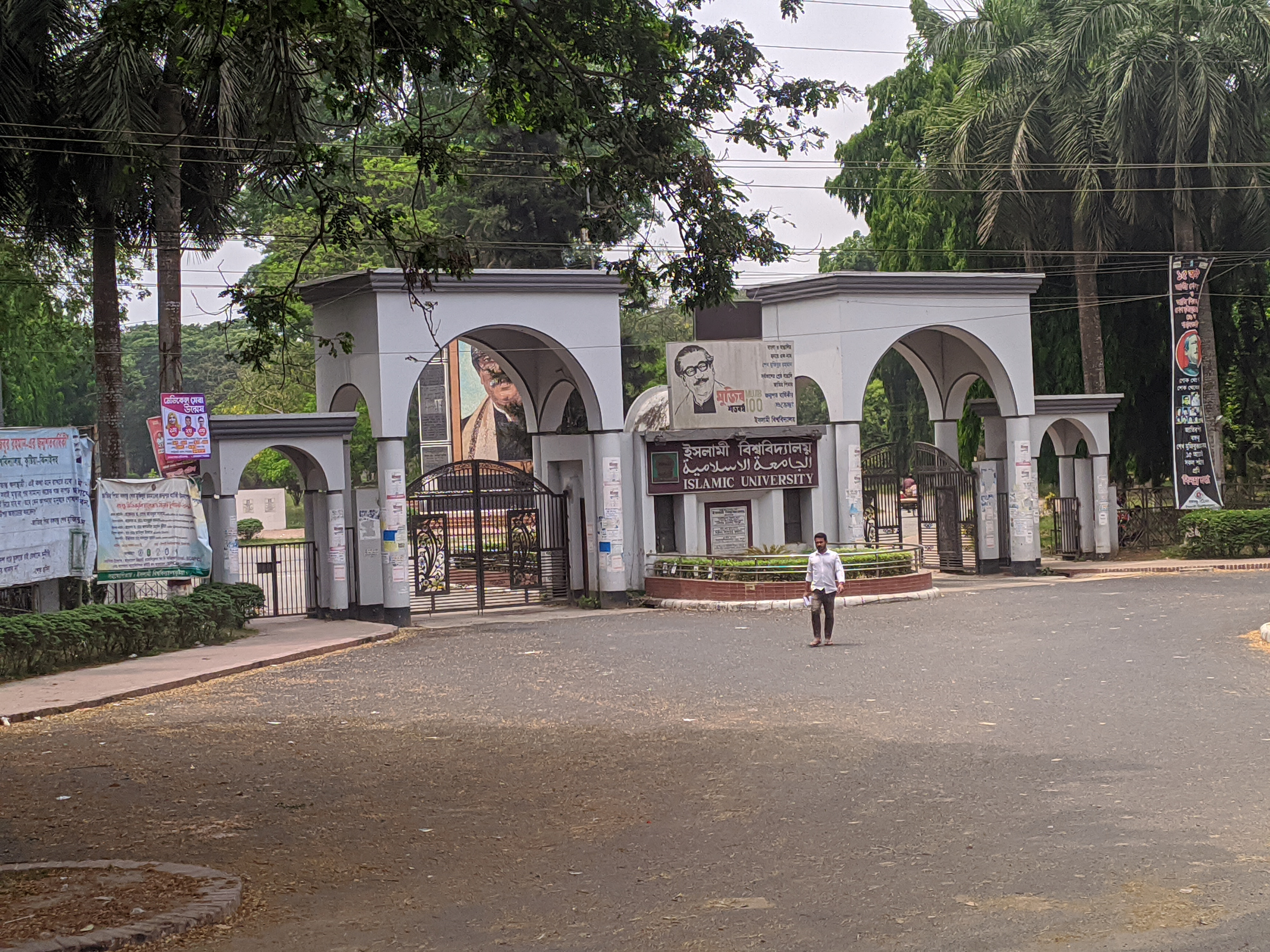
Main gate of Islamic University

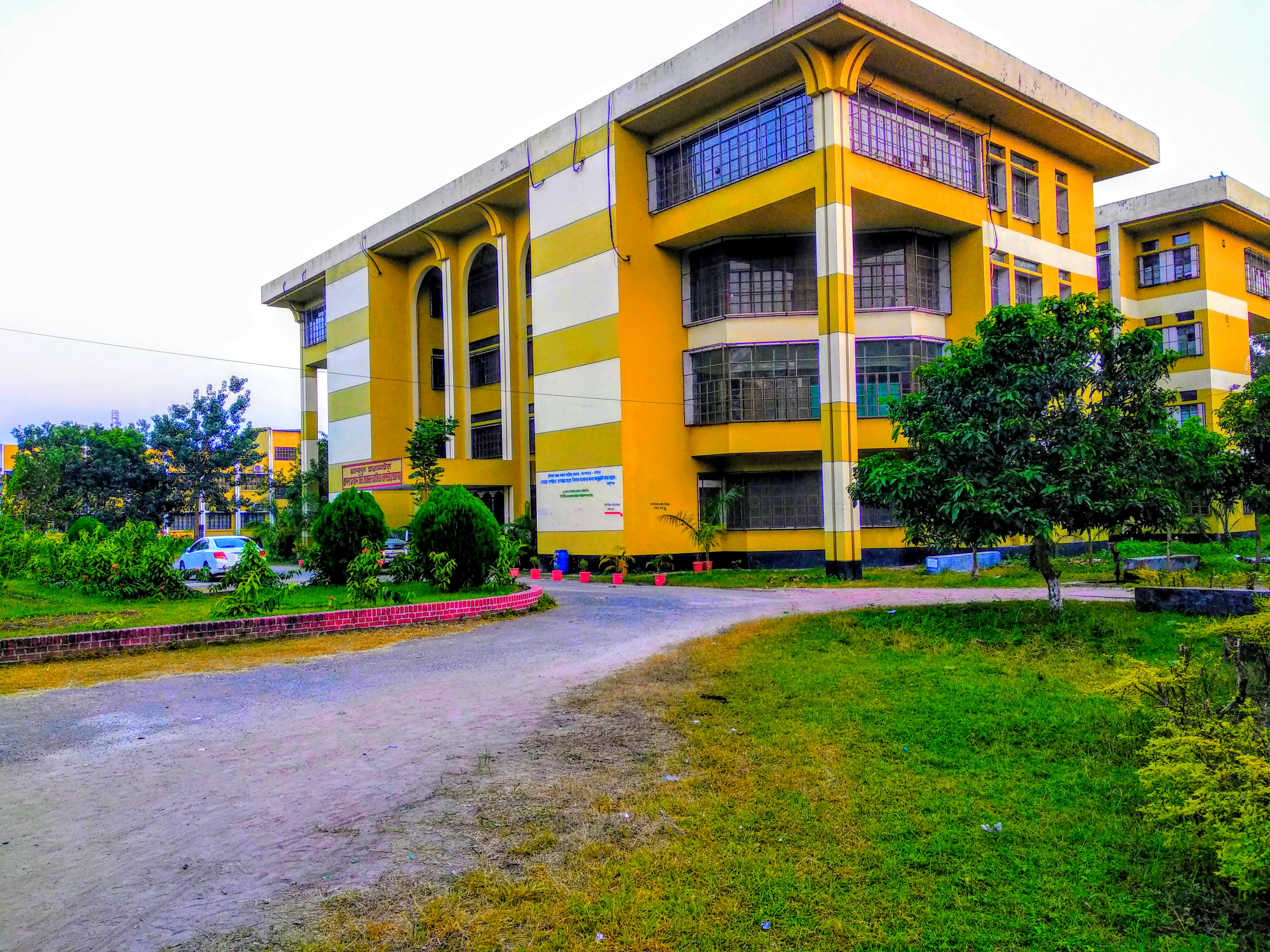
Central Library

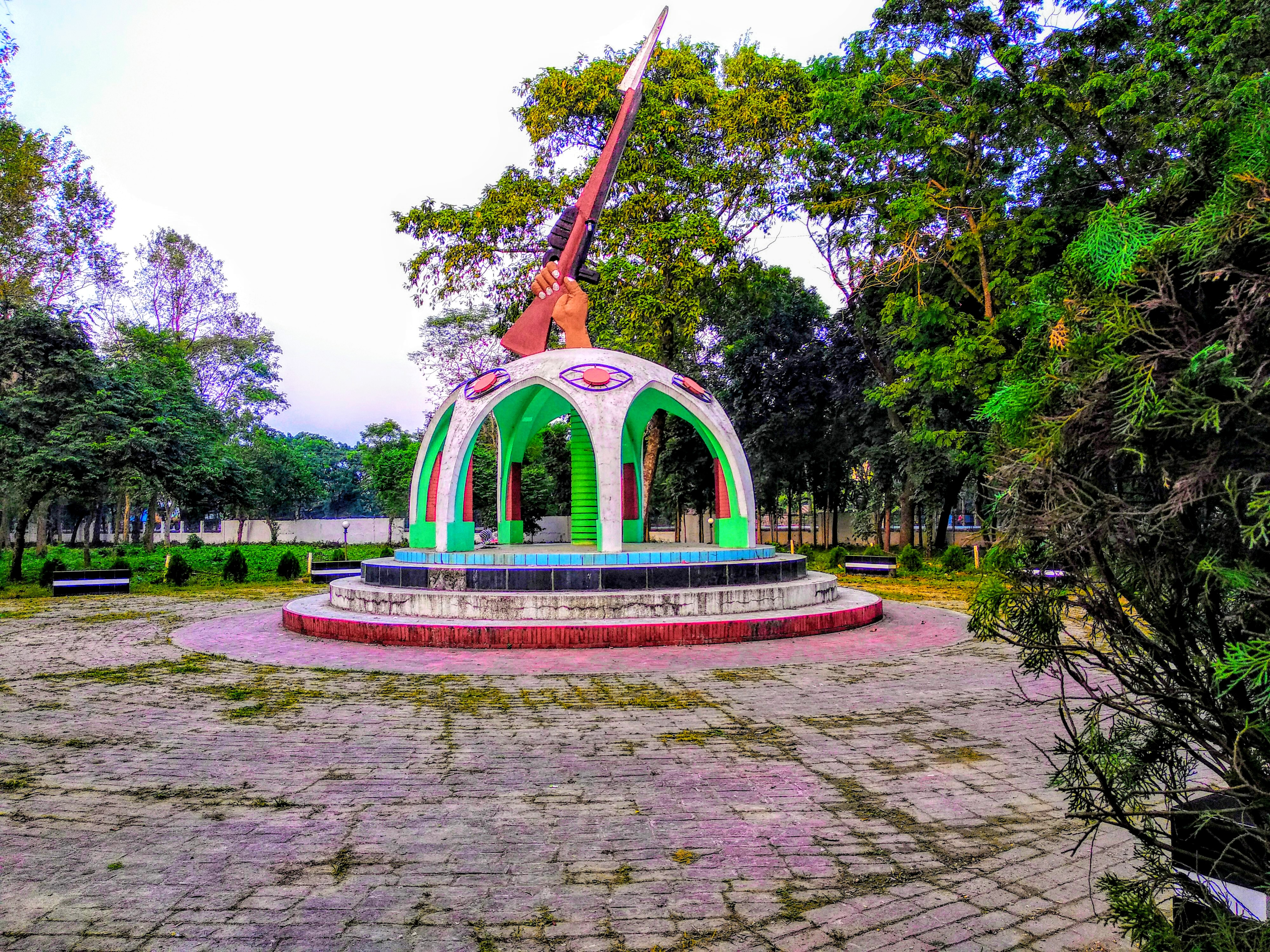
Mukto Bangla

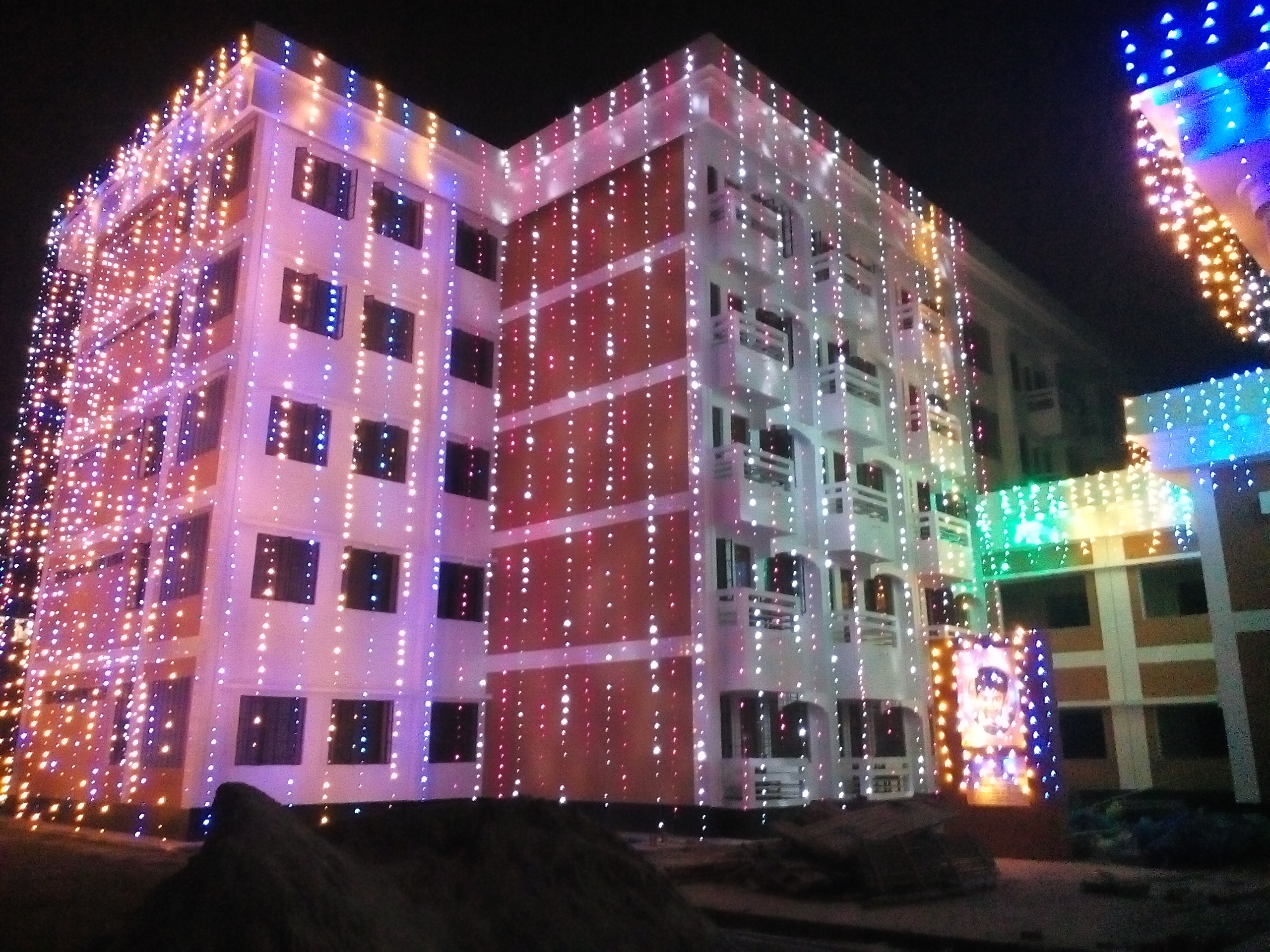
Sheikh Russell Hall at IU

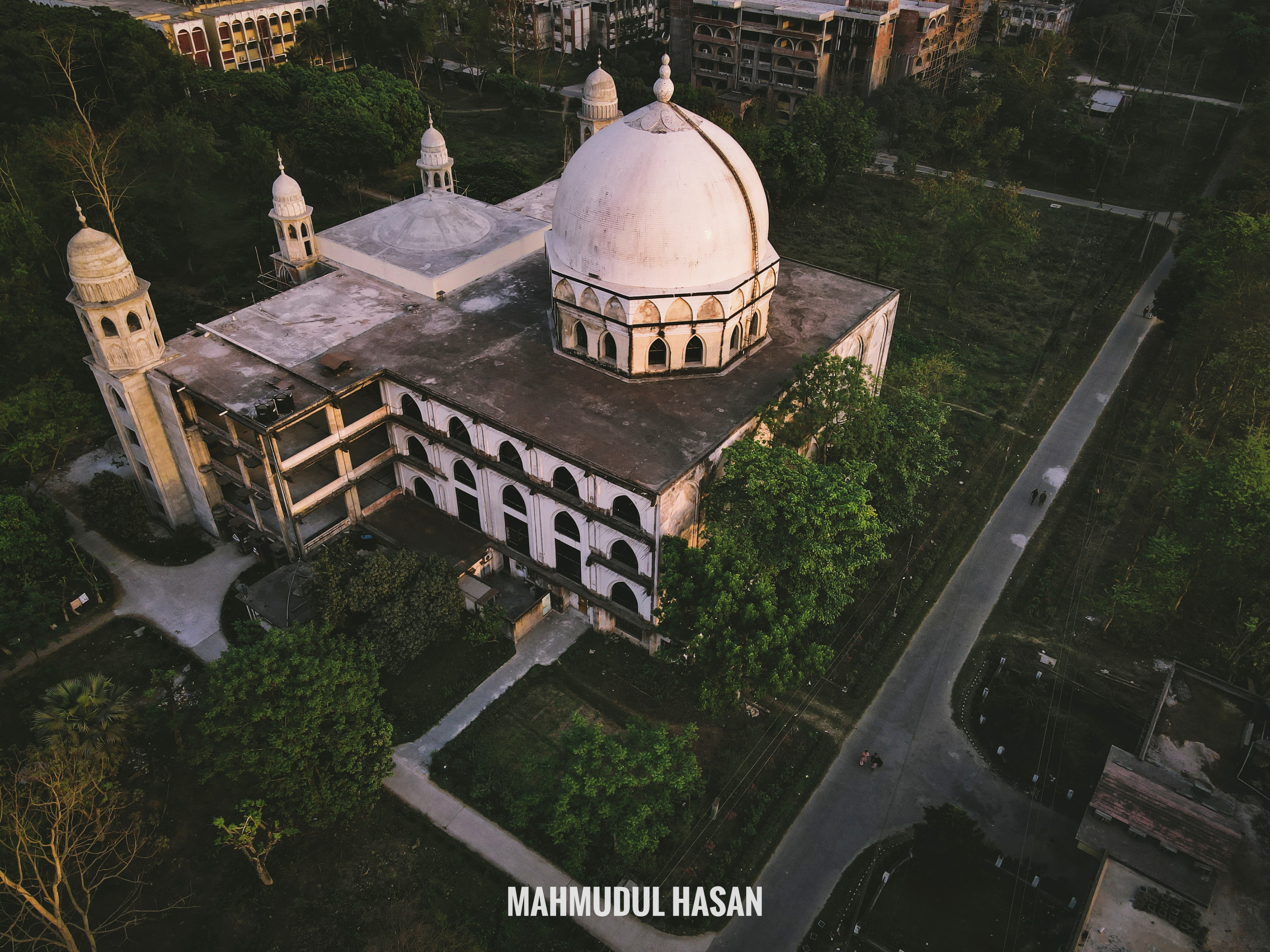
Central mosque

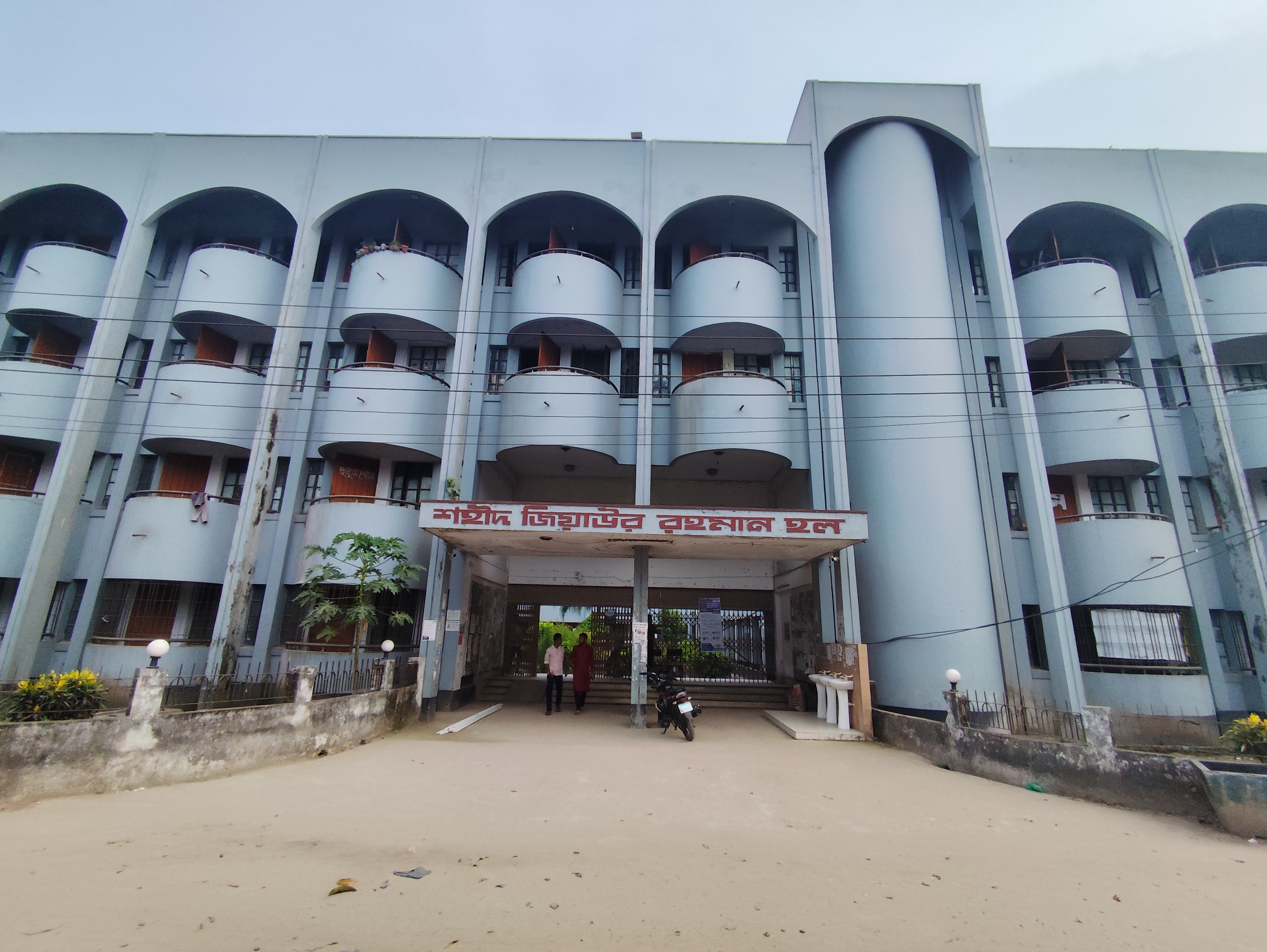
Shahid Ziaur Rahman Hall, Islamic University

== See also ==
- List of Islamic educational institutions
