= Inam-ul-Haq =

Inam-ul-Haq, Anamul Haque, or Enamul Haque (Arabic: إنعام الحـــق) is a masculine given name and surname of Arabic origin.. Notable people with the name include:

== Given name ==
=== Anamul Haque ===
- Anamul Haque (born 1992), Bangladeshi cricketer
- Anamul Haque Laskar (born 1950), Indian politician
- Anamul Haque Sharif (born 1985), Bangladeshi footballer

=== Enamul Haque ===
- Enamul Huq (1938–2026), Bangladeshi police officer
- Enamul Haque (actor) (1943–2021), Bangladeshi actor and academic
- Enam Ul Haque (born 1945), Bangladeshi ornithologist and writer
- Enamul Haque (cricketer, born 1966) (born 1966), Bangladeshi cricketer
- Enamul Haque (cricketer, born 1986) (born 1986), Bangladeshi cricketer
- Enamul Haque (engineer) (born 1969), Bangladeshi politician
- Enamul Haque (footballer) (born 1985), Bangladeshi footballer
- Enamul Huq (museologist) (1937–2022), Bangladeshi museologist
- Enamul Haque (politician) (1939–2023), Bangladeshi Army officer and politician
- Enamul Haque Babul (born 1954), Bangladeshi politician
- Enamul Haque Chowdhury (1948–2011), Bangladeshi politician
- Enamul Haque Enam (born 1969), Bangladeshi politician
- Enamul Haq Manju, Bangladeshi politician
- Enamul Haque Mostafa Shahid (1938–2016), Bangladeshi politician

=== Inamul Haque ===
- Inaamulhaq (born 1979), Indian actor and screenwriter
- Inam-ul-Haq (cricketer) (born 1979), Pakistani cricketer
- Inam-ul-Haq (diplomat) (born 1940), Pakistani diplomat
- Inam-ul-Haq (Lahore cricketer) (born 1943), Pakistani cricketer
- Inamul Haque (scientist) (1940–2014), Indian chemist
- Inamul Haque Khan (1927–2017), Pakistani Air Force officer

== Surname ==
=== Enamul Haque ===
- ASM Enamul Haque (1944–2023) Bangladeshi politician
- Muhammad Enamul Haq (1902–1982), Bangladeshi academic
- Muhammad Enam-Ul Haque (1939–2015), Bangladeshi academic
- Muhammad Enamul Huq (born 1947), Bangladeshi politician

=== Inamul Haque ===
- ARM Inamul Haque (1921–1977), Bangladeshi engineer, veteran, and social worker
