= Von Gunten =

Von Gunten is a surname meaning “from Gunten,” from the village of Gunten in Sigriswil, Switzerland.

Notable people with the surname include:

- Ernst von Gunten (1921–2010), Swiss sprinter
- Hansruedi von Gunten (1928–2021), Swiss chemist and mountaineer
- Jules von Gunten (1899–?), Swiss weightlifter
- Patrick von Gunten (born 1985), Swiss ice hockey player
- Peter von Gunten (born 1941), Swiss film director
- Roger von Gunten (1933–2026), Swiss-born Mexican artist and sculptor
- Timo von Gunten (born 1989), Swiss director, writer and producer
- Urs von Gunten (born 1959), Swiss environmental chemist and academic

== See also ==
- Jakob von Gunten, a novel by Swiss writer Robert Walser (1909)
