= National Adhering Organizations =

Authoritative country-specific organizations for chemistry

National Adhering Organizations (NAO) in chemistry are the organizations that work as the authoritative power over chemistry in an individual country. Their importance can be seen by their involvement in IUPAC. Currently, 57 IUPAC National Adhering Organizations exist.

== List of NAOs ==
Country	National Adhering Organization	Website
Australia	Australian Academy of Science	Homepage
Austria	Österreichische Akademie der Wissenschaften	Homepage
Bangladesh	Bangladesh Chemical Society	
Belgium	The Royal Academies for Science and the Arts of Belgium	Homepage
Brazil	Brazilian Chemistry Committee for IUPAC	
Bulgaria	National Committee of Chemistry for IUPAC	Homepage
Canada	Chemical Institute of Canada; Canadian National Committee for IUPAC	Homepage
Chile	Sociedad Chilena de Química	Homepage
China	Chinese Chemical Society Chemical Society located in Taipei	Homepage; Homepage
Croatia	Croatian Chemical Society	Homepage
Cuba	Sociedad Cubana de Química	
Cyprus	Pancyprian Union of Chemists	
Czech Republic	Czech Chemical Society	Homepage
Denmark	Det Kongelige Danske Videnskabernes Selskab	Homepage
Egypt	National Committee for IUPAC	
Ethiopia	Chemical Society of Ethiopia	Homepage
Finland	Suomen Kemian Seura - Kemiska Sällskapet i Finland	Homepage
France	Comité National Français de la Chimie	
Germany	Deutscher Zentralausschuss für Chemie	Homepage
Greece	Association of Greek Chemists	Homepage
Hungary	Hungarian National Committee for IUPAC	
India	Indian National Science Academy	Homepage
Ireland	Royal Irish Academy	Homepage
Israel	Israel Academy of Sciences and Humanities; Israeli Chemical Society	Homepage
Italy	Consiglio Nazionale delle Ricerche	Homepage
Jamaica	Caribbean Academy of Sciences - Jamaica Chapter	Homepage
Japan	Science Council of Japan	
Jordan	Jordanian Chemical Society	Homepage
Korea	Korean Federation of Science and Technology Societies (KOFST)	Homepage
Kuwait	Kuwait Chemical Society	
Luxembourg	Fonds National de la Recherche	Homepage
Malaysia	Institut Kimia Malaysia	Homepage
Netherlands	Koninklijke Nederlandse Chemische Vereniging	Homepage
New Zealand	Royal Society of New Zealand	Homepage
Norway	Norsk Kjemisk Selskap	Homepage
Pakistan	Chemical Society of Pakistan	
Poland	Polska Akademia Nauk	
Portugal	Sociedade Portuguesa de Química	Homepage
Puerto Rico	Colegio de Químicos de Puerto Rico	Homepage
Russia	National Committee of Russian Chemists; Russian Academy of Sciences	Homepage; Homepage
Serbia	Serbian Chemical Society	Homepage
Slovakia	Slovak National Committee of Chemistry for IUPAC	Homepage
Slovenia	Slovenian Chemical Society	Homepage
South Africa	National Committee for IUPAC; National Research Foundation (NRF)	Homepage
Spain	Comite Espanol de la IUPAC	
Sri Lanka	Ceylon Institute of Chemistry	Homepage
Sweden	Svenska Nationalkommittén för Kemi	Homepage
Switzerland	Swiss Academy of Sciences (SCNAT)	Homepage
Tanzania	Tanzania Chemical Society	Homepage
Thailand	Chemical Society of Thailand; The Department of Science Service (DSS)	Homepage; Homepage
Tunisia	Société Chimique de Tunisie	Homepage
Turkey	Türkiye Kimya Dernegi	Homepage
Ukraine	National Academy of Sciences of Ukraine	
United Kingdom	Royal Society of Chemistry	Homepage
United States	National Academy of Sciences	Homepage
Uruguay	PEDECIBA Quimica	Homepage
