= Qaisuddin =

Bangladeshi Researcher, chemist and academic

M Qaisuddin
- কায়েস উদ্দিন

5th Vice-chancellor, Islamic University, Bangladesh
- In office 03 September 1997 – 10 October 2000
- Preceded by: Muhammad Enam-Ul Haque
- Succeeded by: Muhammad Lutfar Rahman

Vice-chancellor, Bangladesh Open University
- In office 2000–2004

Personal details
- Born: 15 July 1937 Alinagar Union, Gomastapur Upazila, Chapainawabganj District, East Pakistan
- Died: 11 November 2021 (aged 84)
- Spouse: Latifa Qais
- Children: 4
- Relatives: Abu Hasan Shahriar
- Education: University of Rajshahi; University of Dhaka; University of Glasgow; Imperial College London
- Occupation: Academician, professor, researcher

Qaisuddin (15 July 1937 – 11 November 2021) was a Bangladeshi academic, researcher and chemist. He served as the vice chancellor of two universities in Bangladesh, Islamic University, Bangladesh and Bangladesh Open University. He was the fifth vice chancellor of the Islamic University. He was a professor in the Department of Biochemistry, Rajshahi University. He was first academician of Bangladesh to act as vice-chancellor of two universities serially.

== Early life ==
Qaisuddin was born on 15 July 1937 in Alinagar Union of Gomstapur Upazila of Chapai Nawabganj District.

Qaisuddin passed with honors from Rajshahi University in 1957, and completed his master's degree from University of Dhaka. He received a Commonwealth Scholarship for PhD research from Glasgow University, UK in 1961. He was awarded the Commonwealth Academic Staff Fellowship for post-doctoral research at the Imperial College of Science and Technology.

== Career ==
He was the founding chairman of the biochemistry department at Rajshahi University in 1976. He was dean of the Faculty of Science of Rajshahi University, president of Rajshahi University Teachers Association (RUTA), and a syndicate member of Islamic University, Bangladesh.

=== Vice-chancellorship ===
Qaisuddin became the vice chancellor of Islamic University on 3 September 1997. After serving for three years, he joined Bangladesh Open University as a vice chancellor.

== Works ==
=== Research ===
Qaisuddin published more than 50 research articles in local and foreign science journals. Important journal articles include:

- Kinetic studies on the catalytic reduction of o‐, m‐, and p‐nitrophenols by hydrazine
- M.K. Rahman, N. Absar, M. Shahjahan and M. Qaisuddin: Studies on the biochemicl and nutritional aspects of the defferent varieties of mangoes of Rajshahi region. Rajshahi University Studies, Part B, Vol. XVI, 209-219 (1988), Bangladesh.
- Molla, A. H., Rahman, M.B. & Qaisuddin, M. 1987.Biochemical and nutritional studies on the Bangladeshi fresh water eel, Anguilla bengalensis (Bao Baim). 33-39, ISSN 1023-6104, Publishers: Rajshahi University Zoological Society
- Central line-associated bloodstream infection in pediatric oncology patients in Qatar: A prospective study
- The quaternary alkaloids of Aspidsoperma peroba F. Allem. ex Sal
- Central line-associated bloodstream infection in pediatric oncology patients in Qatar: A prospective study
- Study of variability and correlation of some chemical characteristics in chilli (Capsicum annuum L.) [1991]
- Md. Ekramul Haque, M. Qaisuddin, and M. G. Hossain, Studies on the Physico-chemical Properties of Euphorhia helioscopia Lin, Seed Oil. Chittagong University Studies, Part-II, Science, 14(2): 29-35 (1990).
- Nikkon F, Haque ME, Islam MA and Qaisuddin M. (1995). Isolation of (-)-epicatechin from the stem bark of Averrhoa carambola Linn. J. Bio Sci., 3: 97-102.

=== Membership ===
- Member of Bangladesh Medical Research Council
- Member of Bangladesh Chemical Society
- Member of the Board of Directors Rajshahi Krishi Unnoyon Bank

=== Conferences ===
- The 4th International Symposium on Anaerobic Digestion was held in Guangzhou, China with the support of UNESCO
- Seminar on "Father of the Nation Bangabandhu Sheikh Mujibur Rahman & Emergence Bangladesh", organized on December 16, 1997, at the South Asia Institute of Heidelberg University

== Awards ==
- BJ Award from Bangladesh Journalist Association in 2001
- Commonwealth Academic Staff Fellowship from Imperial College of Science and Technology
