= Muhammad Lutfar Rahman =

Bangladeshi chemist, researcher and academician

- মুহাম্মাদ লুৎফর রহমান

6th Vice-Chancellor of Islamic University, Bangladesh
- In office 20 October 2000 – 3 November 2001
- Preceded by: Qaisuddin
- Succeeded by: Muhammad Mustafizur Rahman

Personal details
- Born: 2 May 1942 (age 84)
- Education: University of Cambridge; University of Rajshahi; Rajshahi College; Pabna Edward College
- Occupation: Chemist, university academic

Muhammad Lutfar Rahman (born 2 May 1942) is a Bangladeshi professor, chemist and researcher. He was sixth vice chancellor (from 20 October 2000 to 3 November 2001) of Islamic University, Bangladesh. He was professor of Rajshahi University at Chemistry department. He is now contract professor of Independent University, Bangladesh in Environmental Science and Management department.

== Early life ==
Rahman was born on 2 May 1942 to Abul Hossain and Sikarunnesa.

== Education ==
- Matriculation: (now SSC), Khoksa Janipur Government Pilot Secondary School, District First (1958 Batch)
- Intermediate: (now HSC), Pabna Edward College, 6th place in Rajshahi Division (1960 Batch)
- BSc (Hons) in Chemistry, Rajshahi College, Year of Graduation: 1963
- M.Sc in Chemistry (Physical Chemistry), Rajshahi University. Year of Graduation: 1964.
- Ph.D in Physical Chemistry, University of Cambridge. Year of Graduation: 1969

== Career ==
- 1965 – 1973: Assistant Professor, Department of Chemistry, Rajshahi University.
- 1973 – 1980: Associate Professor, Department of Chemistry, Rajshahi University
- 1980 – 1985: Faculty of Science (on lien) University of Garyunis, Libya
- 1980 – 2006: Professor, Department of Chemistry, Rajshahi University.
- 1986 – 1989: Chairman, Department of Chemistry, Rajshahi University
- 1993 – 1995: Dean, Faculty of Science, Rajshahi University
- 1998 – 2000: Pro Vice Chancellor, National University, Gazipur
- 2000 – 2001: Vice Chancellor, Islamic University, Bangladesh.
- 2006 – Now: Professor (on contract), Department of Environmental Science and Management (SESM) Independent University, Bangladesh (IUB)

== Publications ==
- Chakraborty, Haribal; Paul, Niranjan; Rahman, M. Lutfor (1994-10-01). "Catalytic activities of Schiff base aquocomplexes of copper(II) towards hydrolysis of amino acid esters". Transition Metal Chemistry. 19 (5): 524–526. doi:10.1007/BF00136366. ISSN 1572-901X. S2CID 95618857.
- Rahman, M. L.; Linnett, J. W. (1971-01-01). "Recombination of atoms at surfaces. Part 10.—Nitrogen atoms at pyrex surfaces". Transactions of the Faraday Society. 67: 170–178. doi:10.1039/TF9716700170. ISSN 0014-7672.
- Hossain, M. Kamal; Rahman, M. Lutfor; Hoque, A. T. M. Rafiqul; Alam, M. Khairul (2004-12-01). "Comparative regeneration status in a natural forest and enrichment plantations of Chittagong (south) forest division, Bangladesh". Journal of Forestry Research. 15 (4): 255–260. Bibcode:2004JFoR...15..255H. doi:10.1007/BF02844948. ISSN 1993-0607. S2CID 37438094.
- Chakraborty, Haribal; Rahman, M. Lutfor (1994-10-01). "Kinetics of hydrolysis of amino acid esters in the presence of aquocomplexes involving ethylenediamine, diethylenetriamine and triethylenetetramine ligands. Part 2. Cobalt(II), cobalt(III), platinum(II) and palladium(II)". Transition Metal Chemistry. 19 (5): 481–483. doi:10.1007/BF00136354. ISSN 1572-901X. S2CID 95843584.
- Marshall, Roger M.; Rahman, Lutfor (1977). "Radical equilibrium studies; the thermodynamic parameters of n-propyl". International Journal of Chemical Kinetics. 9 (5): 705–724. doi:10.1002/kin.550090503. ISSN 1097-4601.
- Rahman, Lutfor; Silong, Sidik; Zin, Wan Md; Rahman, M. Zaki Ab; Ahmad, Mansor; Haron, Jelas (2000). "Graft copolymerization of methyl acrylate onto sago starch using ceric ammonium nitrate as an initiator". Journal of Applied Polymer Science. 76 (4): 516–523. doi:10.1002/(SICI)1097-4628(20000425)76:4<516::AID-APP9>3.0.CO;2-7. ISSN 1097-4628.
- Hegde, Gurumurthy; Fernandes, Pearl Zynia; Yuvaraj, A. R.; Mei, Gan Siew; Rahman, Lutfor; Yusoff, Mashitah M. (2015). "Light Sensitive Molecule for Photonic Devices". Macromolecular Symposia. 353 (1): 115–120. doi:10.1002/masy.201550315. ISSN 1521-3900.
- Goswami, N.; Rahman, M. L. (1 December 1979). "Kinetic studies on the catalytic reduction of nitrotoluene by hydrazine". Canadian Journal of Chemistry. 57 (23): 3047–3052. doi:10.1139/v79-496.
- Rahman, M. L. (1977). "Spin Density in N3 Radical". Rajshahi University Studies Part B, Journal of Science. VIII: 40–.
- Tarafder, M. T. H.; Begum, Monowara; Rahman, M. L. (April 1986). "Cu (II) Complexes of S-benzyldithiocarbazate" (PDF). Indian Journal of Chemistry, Section A. 25 (4): 377–378.
- Hasan, Shahnoor; Rabbani, Khondkar; Hossain, Miah Ali; Rahman, M. (24 April 2012). "Persistent Organic Pollutants and Pesticide Residues in Seasonal Waters of Rural Bangladesh" (PDF). International Journal of Environment. 2 (1): 41–47. ISSN 2186-6872.

== Membership ==
- Life Member, Bangladesh Chemical Society
- Member, Evaluation Committee for Chemical Sciences, University Grants Commission.
- Member, Bangladesh Association for the Advancement of Science
- Member, Bangladesh Association for the Advancement of Science
- Former President, Bangladesh Chemical Society, Regional Branch, Rajshahi.
- Former Member, Editorial Board, Journal of Bangladesh Chemical Society.
