= Carmichael College =

Public college in Rangpur, Bangladesh

Coordinates: 25.7188°N 89.2550°E

Carmichael College, Rangpur
- কারমাইকেল কলেজ, রংপুর
- Type: Public
- Established: 10 November 1916; 109 years ago
- Founder: J. N. GUPTA
- Affiliations: National University, Bangladesh
- Academic affiliations: Dinajpur Education Board (HSC)
- Principal: Professor Dr. Md. Abul Hossain Mondal
- Faculty: 144
- Students: 17,789
- Undergraduates: 9,667
- Postgraduates: 6,422
- Other students: 1,700 (HSC)
- Location: Lalbag, Rangpur, 5405, Bangladesh
- Campus: 206.33 acres (83.50 ha); Urban
- Language: Bengali
- Nickname: CCR
- Website: carmichael.college.gov.bd
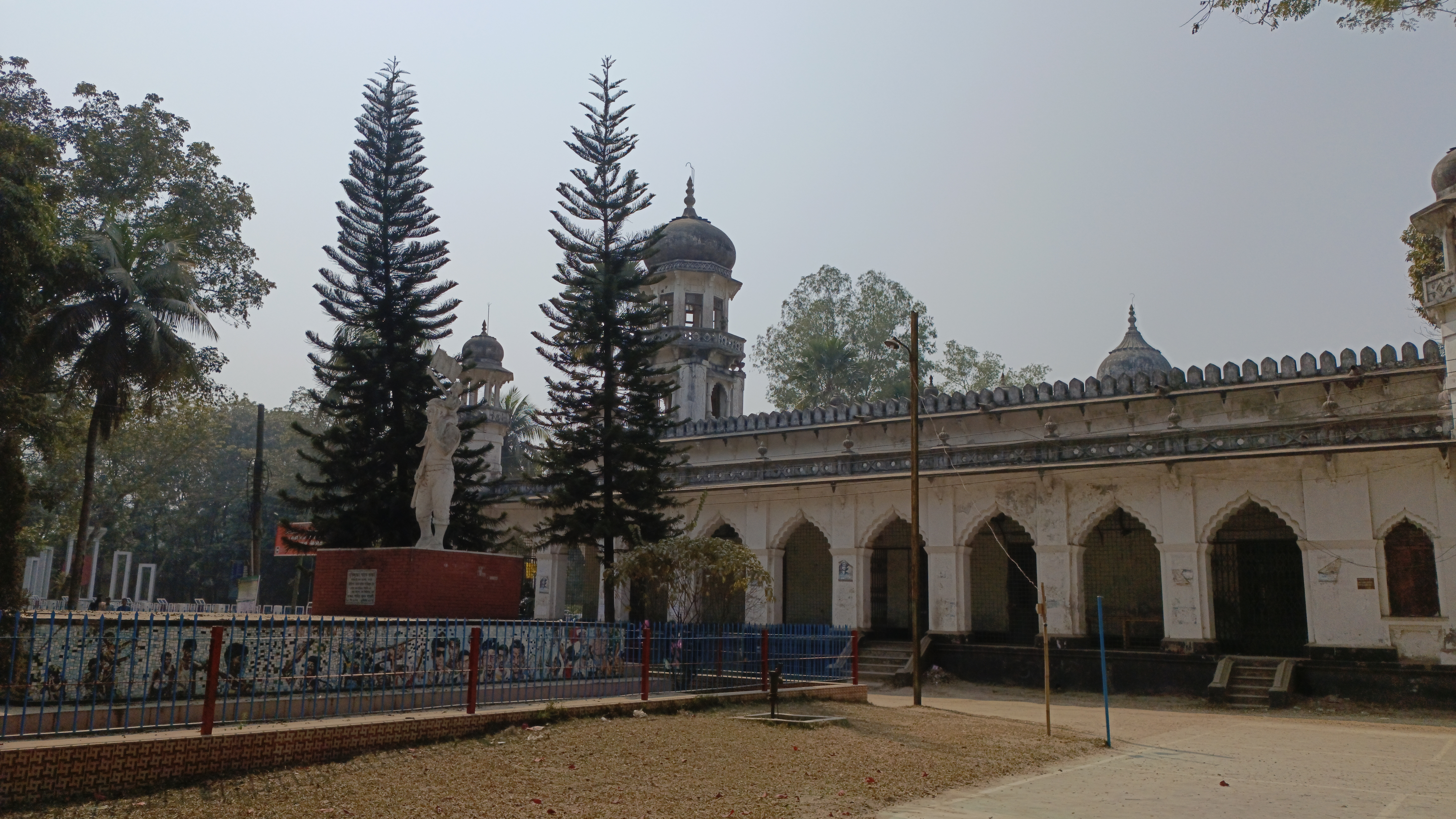

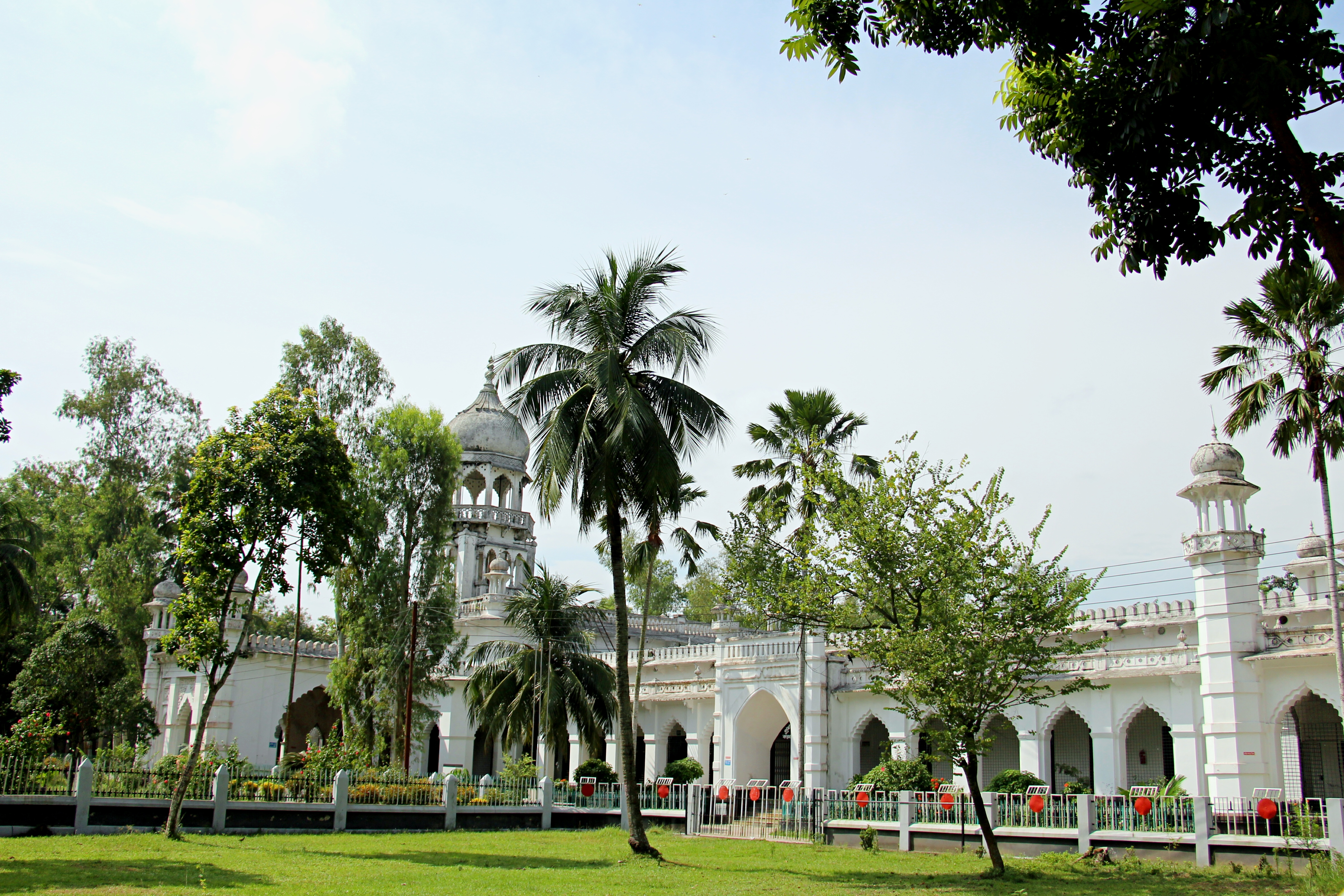
The historic Administrative Building of Carmichael College in Rangpur, Bangladesh. The building was inaugurated on 12 February 1918 by the then Governor of Bengal, the Earl of Ronaldshay, and is noted for its Indo-Saracenic architectural features.

Carmichael College, Rangpur (Bengali: কারমাইকেল কলেজ, রংপুর) (abbreviated as CCR) is a public higher education institution in Bangladesh. Established in 1916 by the then Magistrate Collector of Rangpur, J.N. Gupta and was named after Lord Baron Carmichael. Currently, the college offers education in Science, Humanities and Commerce at the higher secondary level under the Dinajpur Education Board. Additionally, under the National University, it provides Bachelor (Pass) courses, Bachelor (Honors) programs in 18 subjects, Master's Final programs in 17 subjects and Master's Preliminary courses in 16 subjects.

The college is situated in Lalbag, 4 kilometres (2.5 mi) to the south from zero point of the Rangpur town. As of 2025, there are a total of 17,789 students studying in the college. Although the law to establish Rangpur Carmichael University was passed in 2006, due to the government policy of not converting public colleges into universities, Carmichael College was not upgraded to a university. Instead, in 2009, Begum Rokeya University was newly established on land under the ownership of Carmichael College.

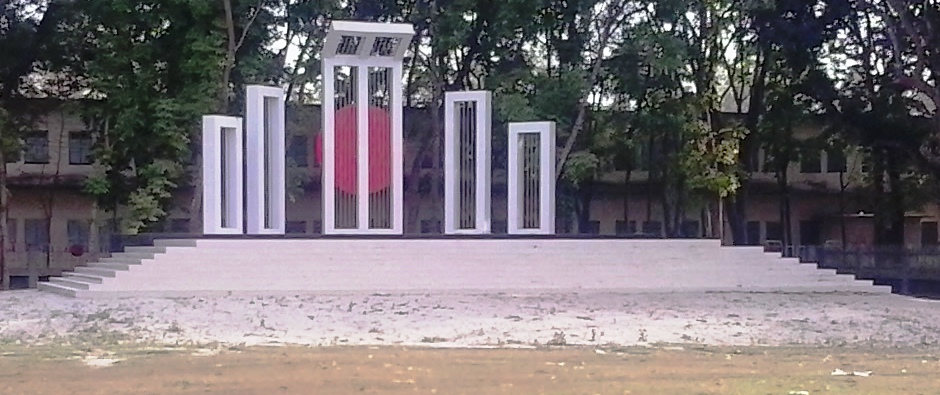
Central Shahid Minar

== History ==
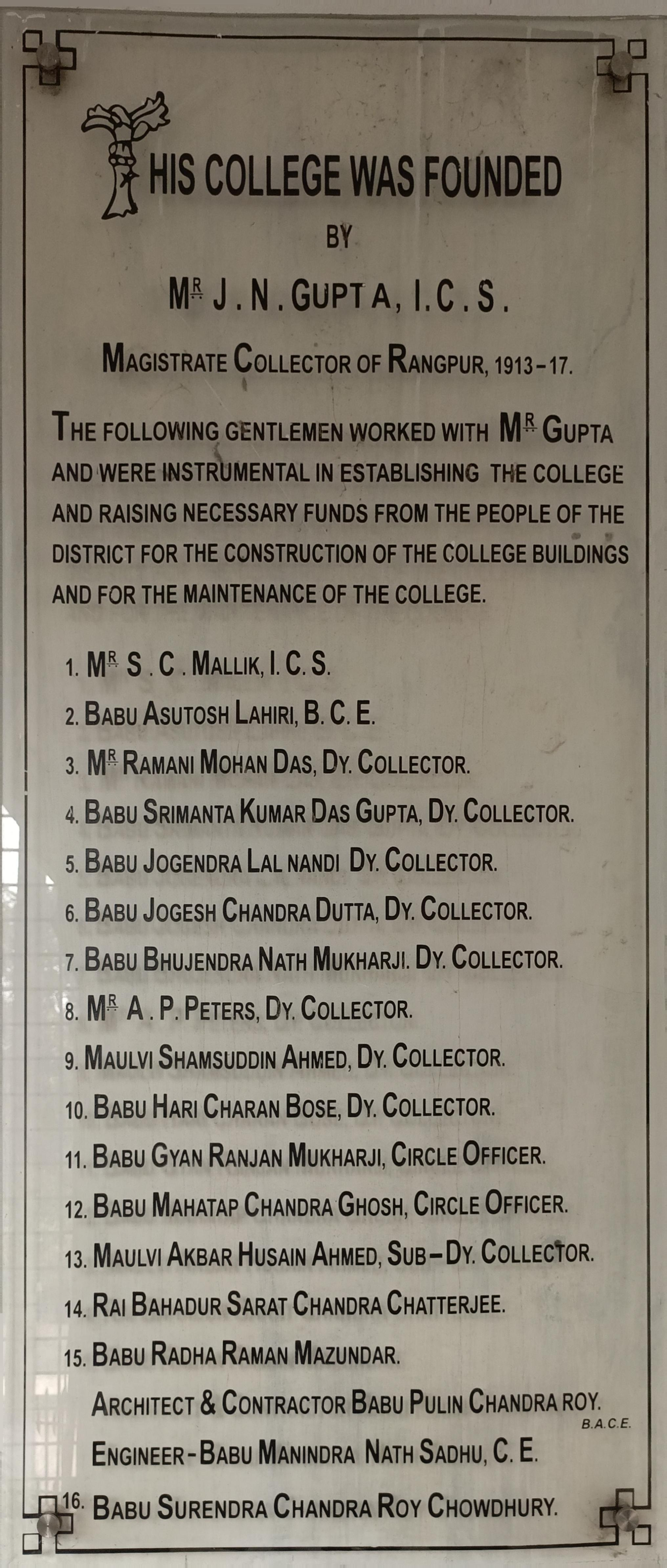
Founder of Carmichael College

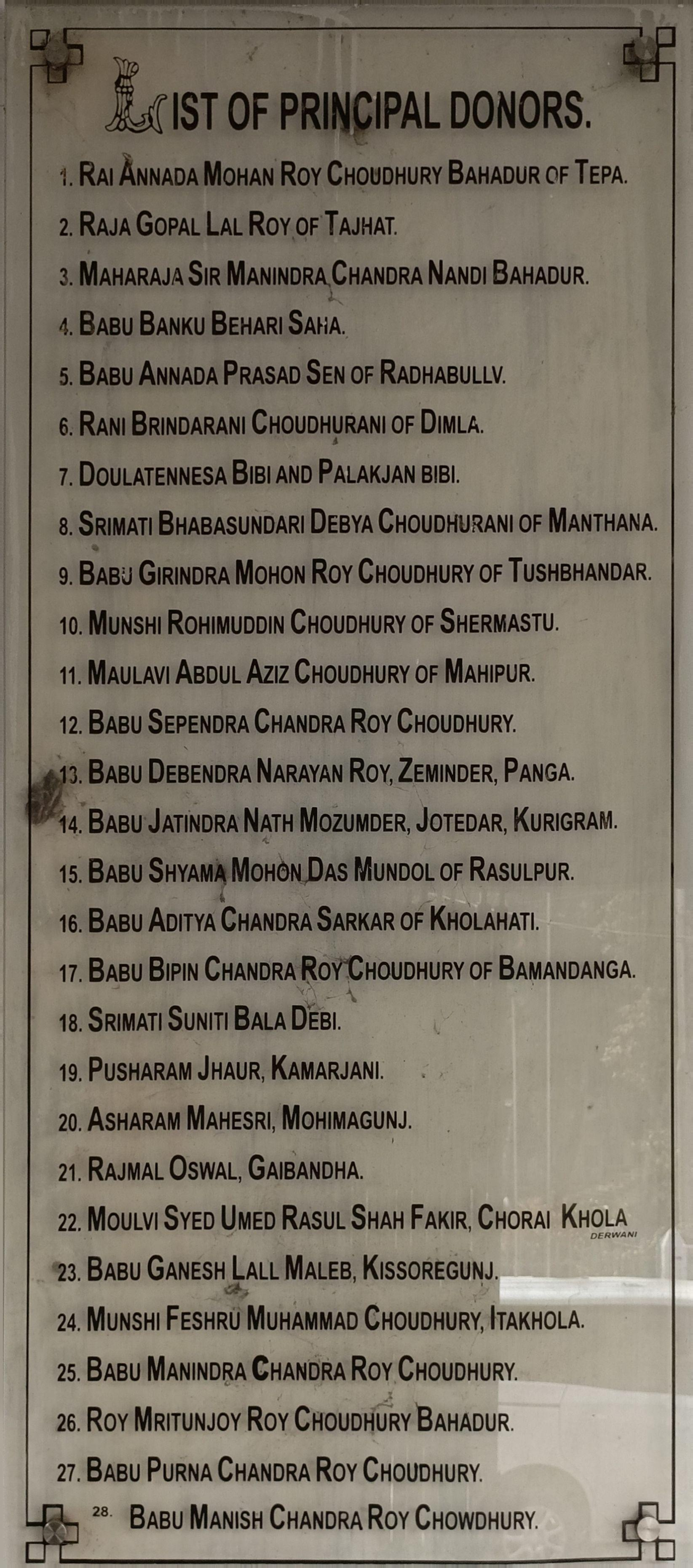
List of Principal Donors

Carmichael College, a prestigious institution in Rangpur, Bangladesh, owes its existence to the collective efforts of numerous individuals. Mr. J. N. Gupta, the then Magistrate Collector of Rangpur, spearheaded the college's establishment. Other notable contributors included local zamindars, government officials, and benevolent citizens. Their generous donations and unwavering support ensured the construction of the college buildings and its continued operation. The first Governor of Bengal, Lord T.D.G. Carmicheal, inaugurated the college in 1916 and it was named after him.

Muhammad Shahidullah with students of the Bangla department at Carmichael College in 1964.

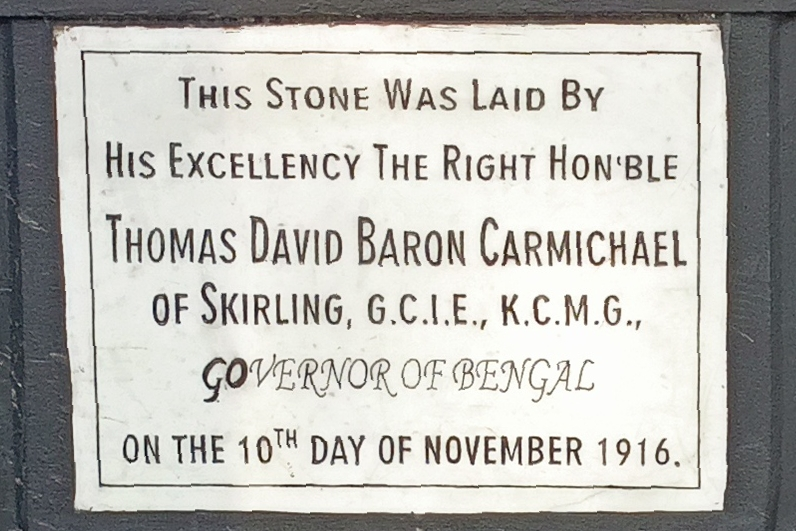
Carmichael College Stone Laid

From the beginning the college was under Calcutta University. It is then nationalized on 1 July 1963. Then in 1992, it came under Bangladesh National University.

=== 1971 War ===
Epitaph at college

In 1971, the Pakistani occupation forces killed Abdur Rahman and Kalachand Roy of the Department of Chemistry, Shah Mohammad Solaiman of the Department of Urdu, Sunilbaran Chakraborty of the Department of Philosophy, Ramkrishna Adhikari of the Department of Bengali, and Chittaranjan Roy of the Department of Mathematics at Carmichael College. Manjushree Roy, the wife of Professor Kalachand Roy, was also killed. On the night of 30 April 1971, Sunilbaran Chakraborty, Ramkrishna Adhikari, Kalachand Roy, and others were abducted from the college campus and shot dead near the Damdama Bridge on the Rangpur-Dhaka Highway. In addition, Khondakar Mukhtar Elahi Chinu, vice-president of the college students’ union, along with Golam Gaus Nausha and Shariful Alam Mokbul, were also killed.

== Campus ==
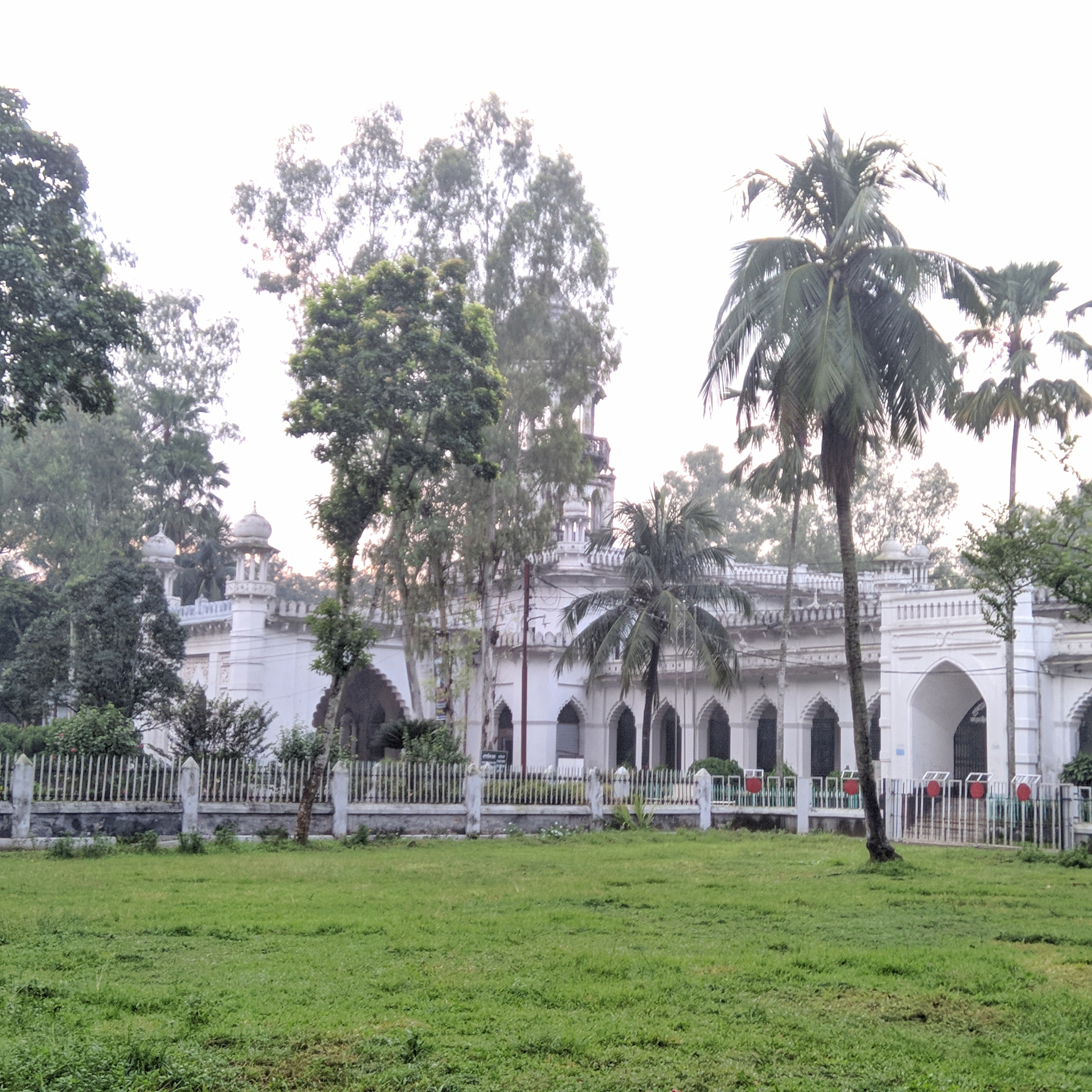
Administrative building

Carmichael College was established on approximately 900 bighas (321 acres) of land donated by the landlords of Kundir, Surendranath Ray Chowdhury, Manindranath Ray Chowdhury, and Mrityunjay Ray Chowdhury. Begum Rokeya University began its journey on land acquired from this college. According to the Bangladesh Bureau of Educational Information and Statistics, the current land area of Carmichael College is 206 acres. Having a huge area of 206 acre and the biggest college in Bangladesh by area, the college campus is adorned with academic buildings, tree orchards, ponds and other infrastructures. There are a number of magnificent buildings in the college. These buildings are as old as the college itself. A big library, Shaheed Minar commemorating the martyrs of language movement in 1952, Liberation war monument, a beautiful mosques and a gymnasium are also in the campus.

== Academics ==
More than 21,522 students in HSC, Honours, and Masters levels are currently studying in this college. The HSC education is controlled by Board of Intermediate and Secondary Education, Dinajpur when 18 honours and masters subjects are taught according to the guidance of Bangladesh National University.

=== Affiliation ===
University	Start	End
University of Calcutta	1916	1947
University of Dhaka	1947	1953
University of Rajshahi	1953	1992
National University, Bangladesh	1992	present

== Admission ==
The admission rule of Board of Intermediate and Secondary Education and National University, Bangladesh is strictly followed by the college. Eligible students are selected according to the result of Secondary School Certificate examination and Higher Secondary Examination by Board of Intermediate and Secondary Education and National University, Bangladesh.

== Faculty & Department ==
=== Higher secondary ===
- Science
- Arts / Humanities
- Commerce / Business studies

=== Bachelor Degree (Pass) ===
- B. A. (Pass)
- B. S. S. (Pass)
- B. Sc. (Pass)
- B. B. S. (Pass)
- C.C

=== Honours and Masters ===
Faculty	Department	Honours	Masters Final	Masters Preliminary
Faculty of Arts	Bangla	Yes	Yes	Yes
Faculty of Arts	English	Yes	Yes	Yes
Faculty of Arts	Arabic	No	Yes	Yes
Faculty of Arts	History	Yes	Yes	Yes
Faculty of Arts	Philosophy	Yes	Yes	Yes
Faculty of Arts	Islamic Studies	Yes	Yes	Yes
Faculty of Arts	Islamic History & Culture	Yes	Yes	Yes
Faculty of Social Science	Sociology	Yes	No	No
Faculty of Social Science	Economics	Yes	Yes	Yes
Faculty of Social Science	Political Science	Yes	Yes	Yes
Faculty of Science	Chemistry	Yes	Yes	Yes
Faculty of Science	Physics	Yes	Yes	Yes
Faculty of Science	Mathematics	Yes	Yes	Yes
Faculty of Business Studies	Accounting and Information Systems	Yes	Yes	Yes
Faculty of Business Studies	Management Studies	Yes	Yes	Yes
Faculty of Business Studies	Marketing	Yes	No	No
Faculty of Business Studies	Finance and Banking	Yes	Yes	No
Faculty of Life & Earth Science	Zoology	Yes	Yes	Yes
Faculty of Life & Earth Science	Botany	Yes	Yes	Yes

== Students ==
According to the 2025 data of the Bangladesh Bureau of Educational Information and Statistics (BANBEIS), Carmichael College has a total of 17,789 students. Among them, 1,700 are enrolled at the Higher Secondary level, 409 at the Bachelor’s (Pass) level, 9,298 at the Bachelor’s (Honours) level, and 6,422 at the Master’s level. Out of the total number of students, 10,121 are female.

== Notable people ==
=== Alumni ===
Education & Literature

- Rebati Mohan Dutta Choudhury (1924 – 2008) Assamese literature, Sahitya Akademi Award winner.
- Maqbular Rahman Sarkar (1928-1985) academic and 10th vice-chancellor of Rajshahi University.
- Jahanara Imam (1929-1994) Recipients of the Independence Day Award
- Rafiqul Haque (1937-2021) Bangladeshi journalist and poet.
- Monajatuddin (1945-1995) Recipients of the Ekushey Padak.
- Manju Sarkar (birth 1953) recipient of Bangla Academy Literary Award.
- Abdul Hye Sikder (birth 1957) Recipients of Bangla Academy Award.
- Anisul Hoque (born 1965) Recipients of Bangla Academy Award.

Art & Culture

- Asaduzzaman Noor (birth 1946) Recipients of the Independence Day Award, 8th, 9th, 10th, 11th & 12th Jatiya Sangsad members, Ministers of cultural affairs of Bangladesh
- Dipankar Dipon (birth 1976) film director and screenwriter

Government & Administration

- Shah Abdul Hamid (1900-1972) 1st Speaker of the Jatiya Sangsad
- Abu Sadat Mohammad Sayem (1916-1997) first Chief Justice of Bangladesh, 5th President of Bangladesh.
- Muhammad Sohrab Hossain (1921-1998) Ex-Minister. Twice MNA Pakistan, Prominent Minister holding 8 ministry in Sheikh Mujib's cabinet.
- M A Khaleq (1921-2008) Advisers of Shahabuddin Ahmed ministry
- Hussain Muhammad Ershad (1930-2019) former president of Bangladesh
- Mahmudul Islam (1936-2016) 10th Attorney General of Bangladesh.
- Mostafizur Rahman Mostafa 2nd Mayor of Rangpur

Politician

- Abdullah al Mahmood (1900–1975) lawyer and politician, minister of industries and natural resources of Pakistan.
- Nurul Huq Choudhury (1902–1987) Member of the National Assembly of Pakistan
- Khairat Hossain (1909-1972) politician and colleague of Sheikh Mujibur Rahman
- Amjad Hossain (1924-1971) Pakistani MNAs 1962–1965
- M. Abdur Rahim (1927-2016) 5th Jatiya Sangsad members, Recipients of the Independence Day Award
- Habibur Rahman (1931-2002) 2nd, 5th, 6th & 7th Jatiya Sangsad members
- Shah Abdur Razzak (1933-2018) Members of the Constituent Assembly of Bangladesh, 3rd Jatiya Sangsad members
- Waliur Rahman (1940-2020) Members of the Constituent Assembly of Bangladesh, 1st Jatiya Sangsad members
- Ramesh Chandra Sen (birth 1940) 7th, 9th, 10th, 11th & 12th Jatiya Sangsad members
- Shahanara Begum (birth 1940) 10th Jatiya Sangsad members
- Khandaker Golam Mostafa (1943-2020) 2nd Jatiya Sangsad members
- Paritosh Chakrabarti (birth 1948) 5th Jatiya Sangsad members
- GM Quader (birth 1948) 7th, 9th & 11th Jatiya Sangsad members
- Nuruzzaman Ahmed (birth: 1950) 10th, 11th & 12th Jatiya Sangsad members
- Asadul Habib Dulu (birth 1957) 6th & 8th Jatiya Sangsad members
- Abbas Ali Khan (1914–1999) education minister of East Pakistan

Movement

- Sharif Imam (1925-1971) Mukti Bahini personnel
- K. Mukhtar Elahi (1949-1971) Mukti Bahini personnel
- Raufun Basunia, student leader, was killed during an anti-autocratic protest against military ruler Hussain Muhammad Ershad in 1985.

=== Faculty ===
- Shahed Ali (1925-2001) litterateur and cultural activist, Recipients of Ekushey Padak & Bangla Academy Award.
- Sanjida Khatun (1933-2025) Recipients of Fourth highest civilian award in India Padma Shri.
- Muhammad Enam-Ul Haque (1939-2015) academician, historian, writer and fourth vice-chancellor of Islamic University, Bangladesh.

== Gallery ==
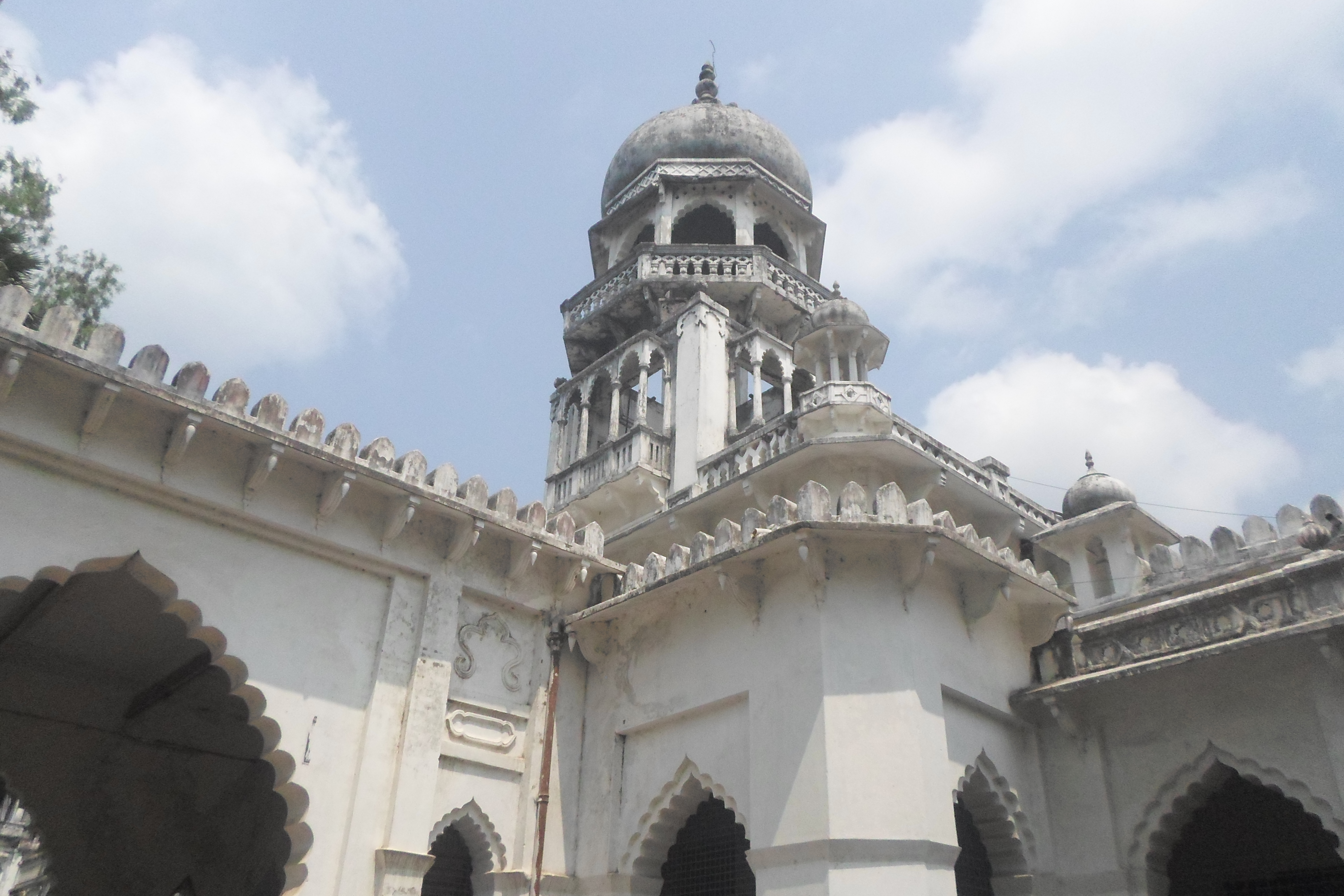

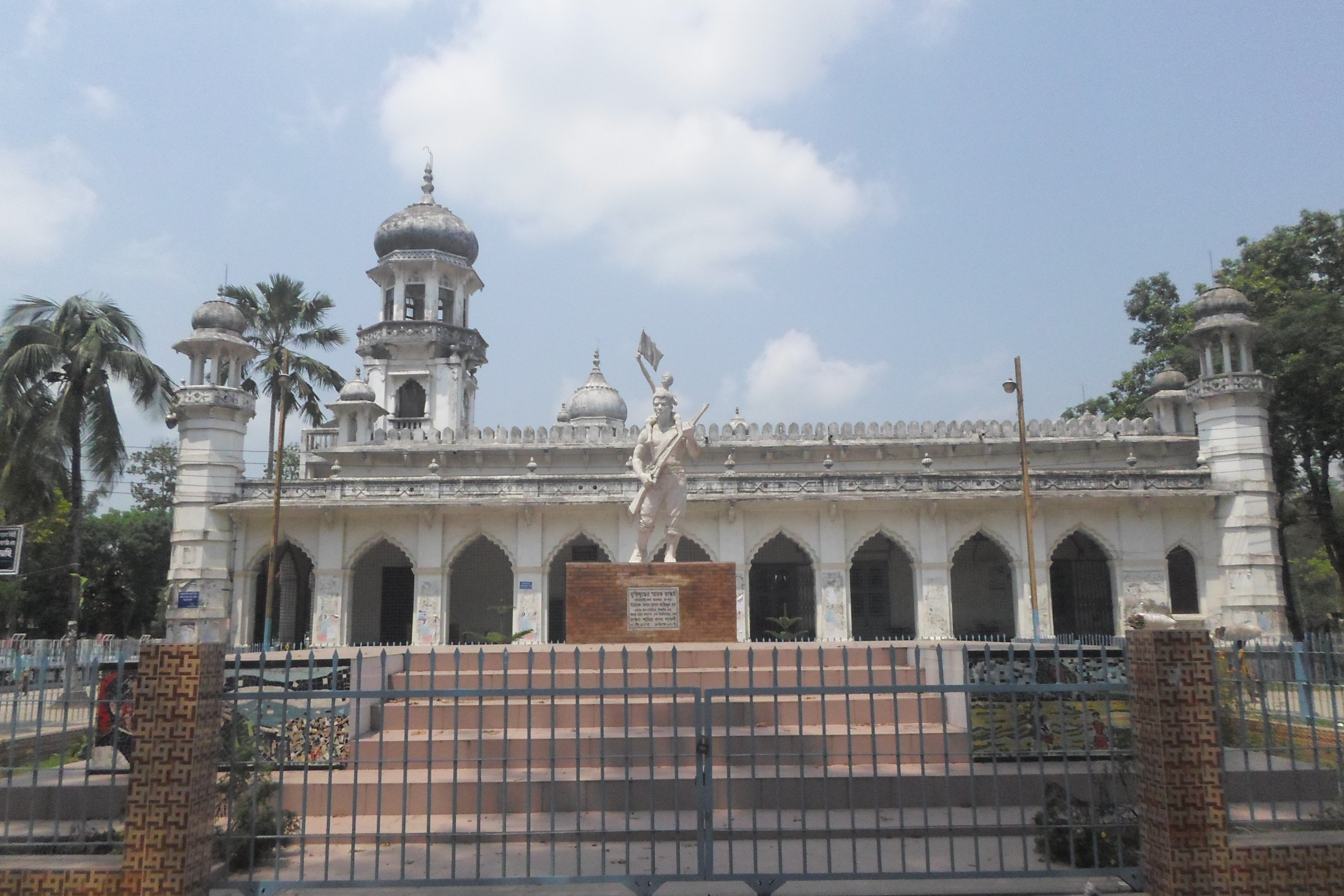

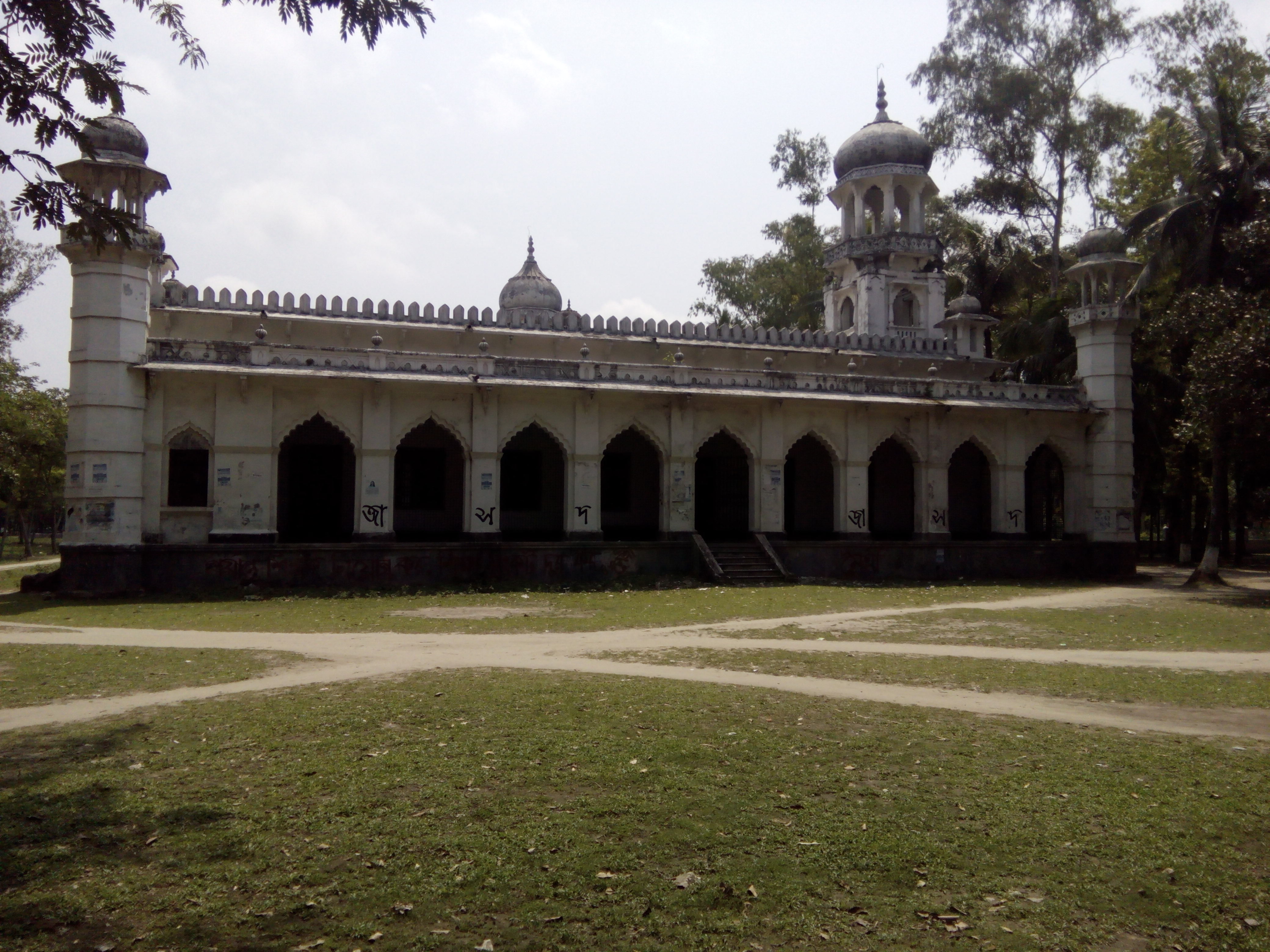

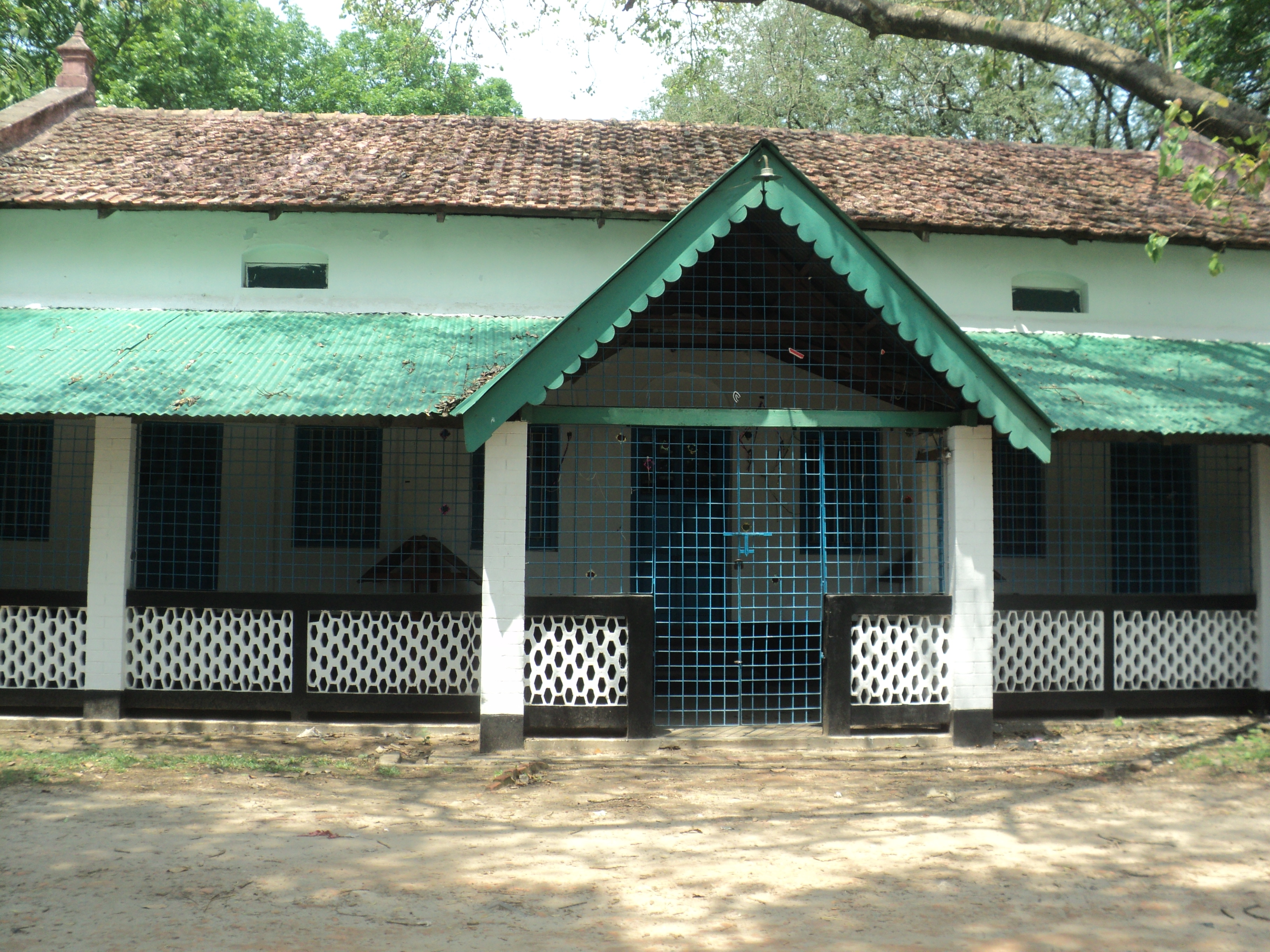
