= Khoksa Janipur Government Pilot Secondary School =

- খোকসা জানিপুর সরকারি পাইলট মাধ্যমিক বিদ্যালয়
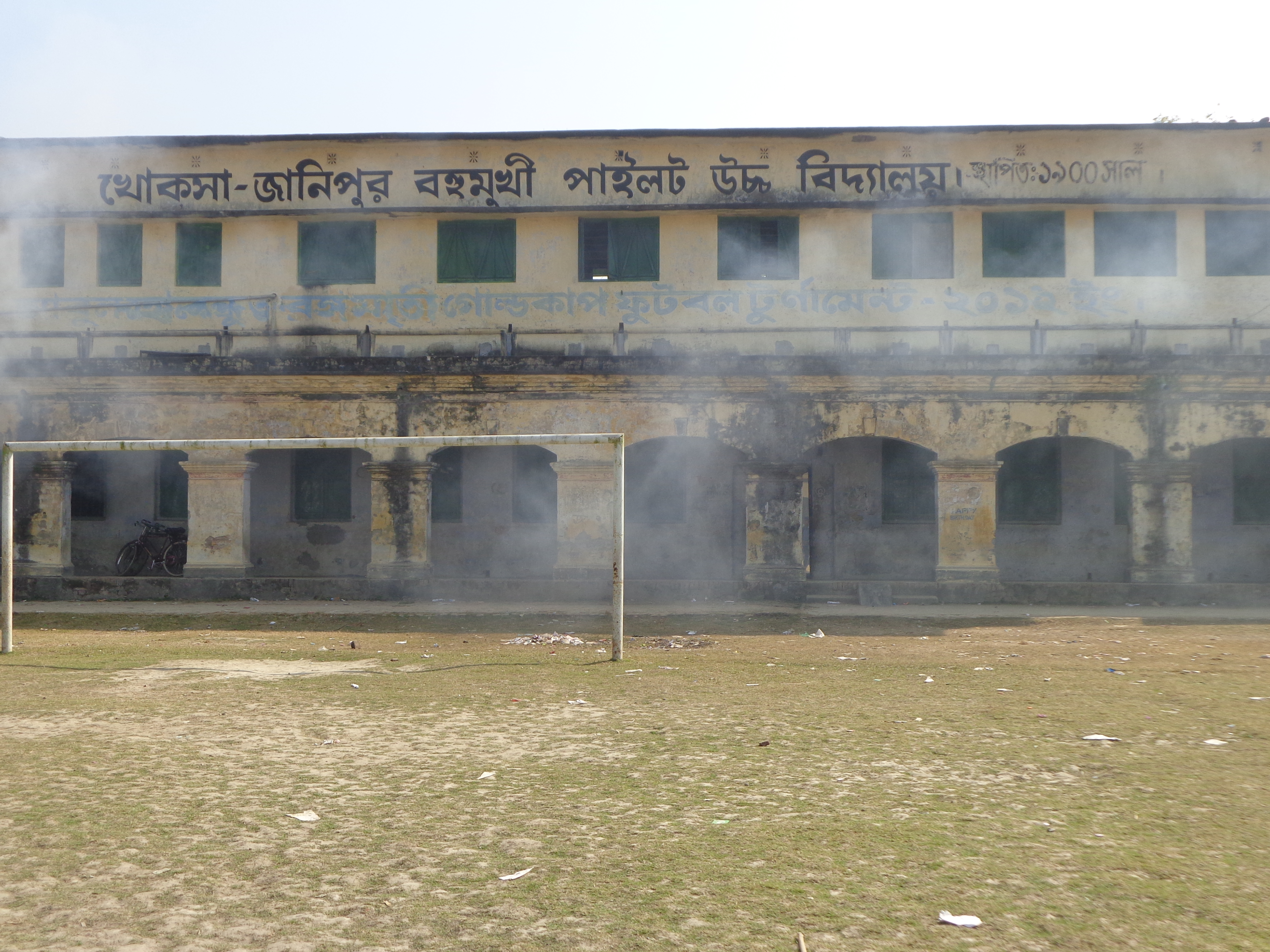
- A old building of school

Location
- Khoksa; Bangladesh; 23.8031352°N 89.2832142°E

Information
- Former names: Khoksa Janipur H.E. School; Khoksa Janipur Bahumukhi High School; Khoksa Janipur Pilot Secondary School
- School type: Secondary school
- Motto: শিক্ষা নিয়ে গড়ব, গর্বের বাংলাদেশ (We will build a proud Bangladesh through education)
- Established: 1900; 126 years ago
- School board: Board of Intermediate and Secondary Education, Jashore
- School district: Kushtia District
- School number: 117621 (EIIN)
- Headmaster: Shahidul Islam
- Assistant Headmaster: Md. Sajib Hossain
- Staff: 7
- Teaching staff: 26
- Classes: 6th-10th
- Language: Bengali
- Campuses: 1
- Area: 6.95 acres (28,100 m^{2})
- Campus type: City
- Website: www.kjgssk.com
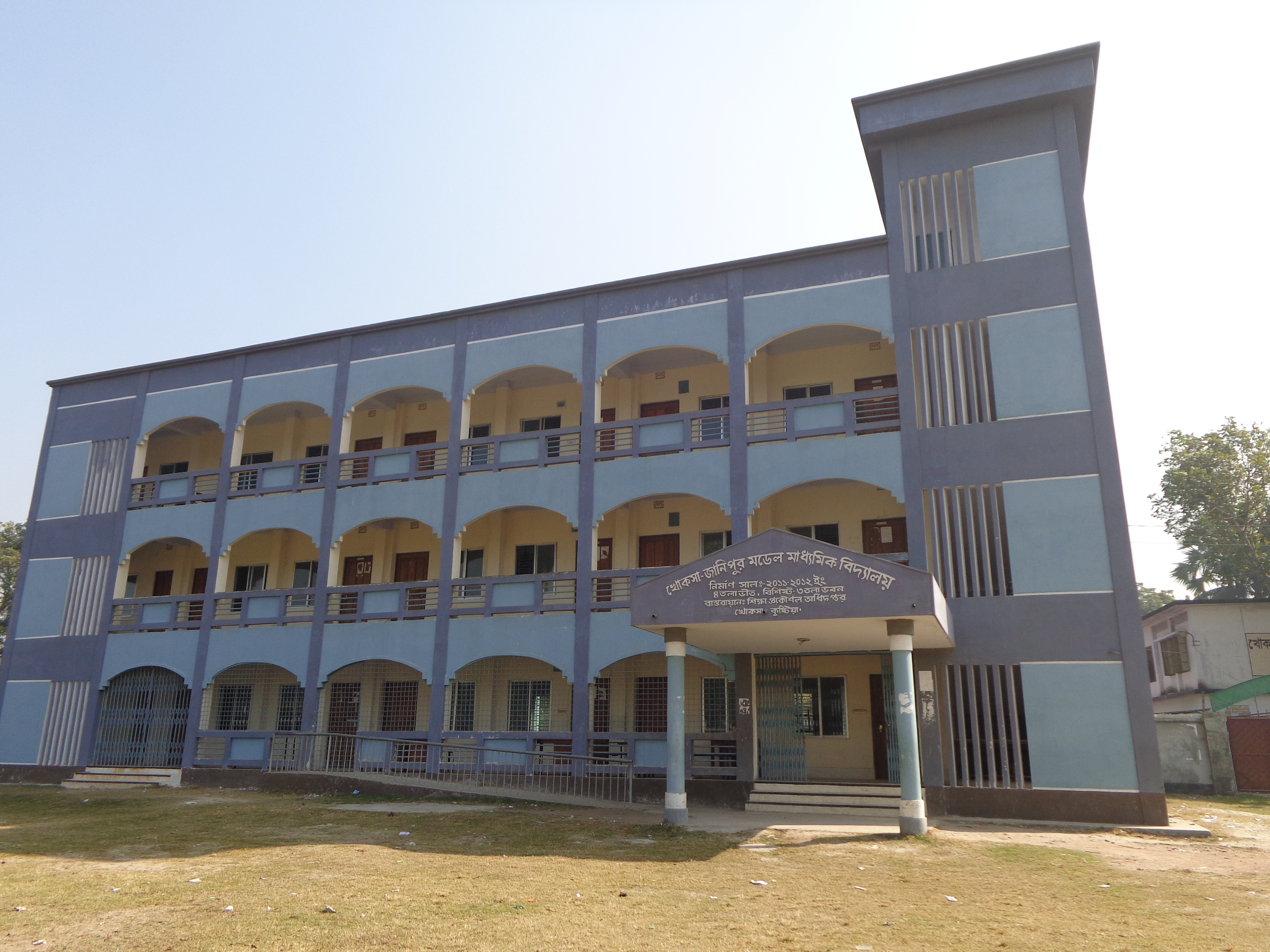

Khoksa Janipur Government Pilot Secondary School is an old government secondary school located in Khoksa of Kushtia District. The school was established in 1900 at the initiative of local individuals of Khoksa. The school was nationalized after a 7 May 2018 announcement.

== History ==
The school was established in 1900 by local people of Khoksar. The first headmaster of the school was Babu Purna Chandra Sen. The school was recognized as an English High School by Calcutta University in 1918. The recommendation and initiative of Rabindranath Tagore, the then zamindar of Birahimpur Mauza (Shilaidaha) played an effective role in registering the school from Calcutta University. On April 24, 1918, the construction of the first concrete building of the school began. The foundation stone of this building was laid by Roy Saheb Bhupendra Mukherjee, the then administrator of Kumarkhali subdivision. After independence the primary branch was separated. As a result, the school became only a secondary school. In 2018, the school was promoted to Government Secondary School.

== Notable students ==
- Abu Bakar Siddiqui - Judge of Appellate Division and High Court Division
- Hasan Foez Siddique - 23rd Chief Justice of Bangladesh
- Muhammad Lutfar Rahman - Bangladeshi professor, chemist and researcher

== Bibliography ==
- Md. Rezaul Karim (December 2022). কুষ্টিয়ার প্রত্ননিদর্শন [Archeology of Kushtia] (in Bengali). 38/2A Banglabazar, Dhaka 1100: Gatidhara. pp. 182–184. ISBN 978-984-8950-41-8.

== External ==
- প্রাতিষ্ঠানিক ওয়েবসাইট
