= Ioannis Katsoyiannis =

Greek environmental chemist

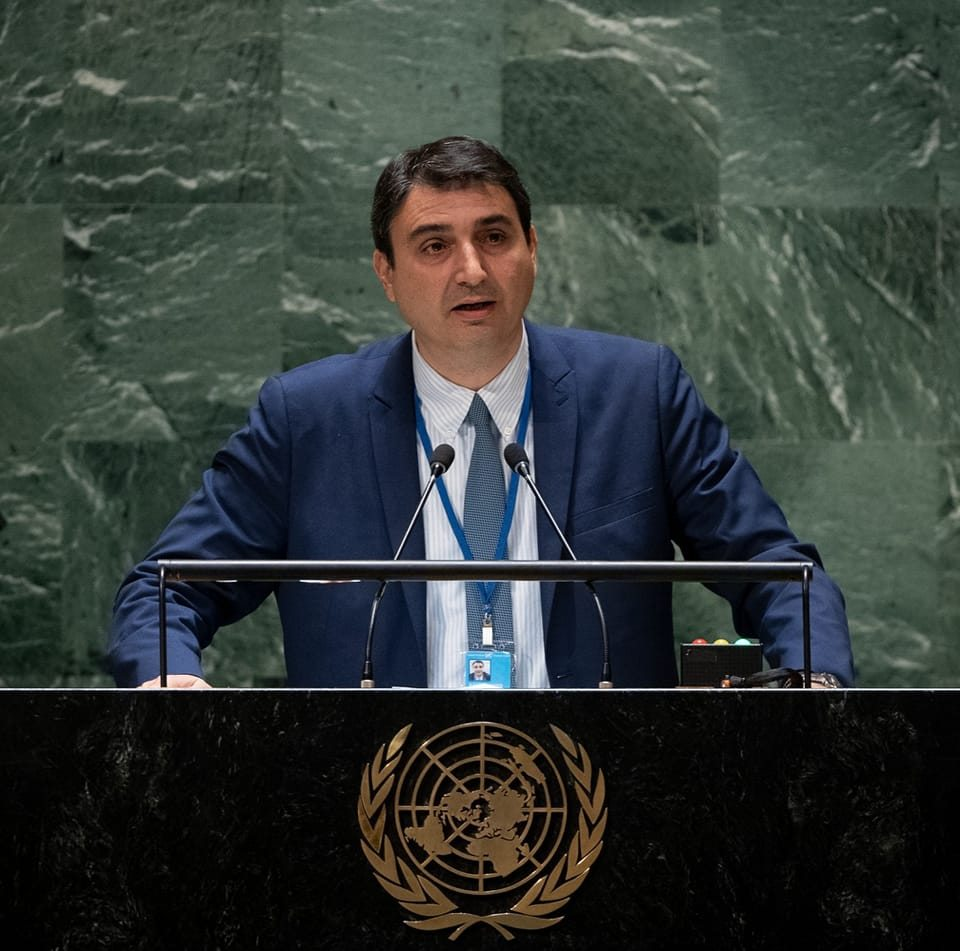
- Ioannis Katsoyiannis giving a speech about the world water situation at the General Assembly of the United Nations
- Born: 4 December 1974 (age 51); Thessaloniki, Greece
- Education: Aristotle University of Thessaloniki; Heriot Watt University
- Spouse: Athanasia Tolkou
- Scientific career
- Institutions: Aristotle University of Thessaloniki

Ioannis Katsoyiannis (born 4 December 1974) is a Greek environmental chemist, Full Professor at the department of chemistry at Aristotle University of Thessaloniki and Director of the Institute of Sustainable Water Management and Water Law of the European Public Law Organization (EPLO). He has earned a reputation among aquatic chemists because of his studies on the development of novel technologies for arsenic removal from groundwaters, especially the investigation and development of biological arsenic removal.

== Early life and family ==
Katsoyiannis was born in Thessaloniki, in Greece and comes from his father's side (Anastasios Katsoyiannis) from the village of Spileon in Grevena and from his mother's side (Mersini Kouimtzi) from Chalastra, a suburb of Thessaloniki mostly known for the biggest rice production in Greece and the mussel cultivation and production. His paternal grandfather, Ioannis Katsoyiannis, was one of the founders and the first secretary of the historic football team of Grevena, Pyrsos Grevena, which was founded in 1927! His brother Athanasios Katsoyiannis, also a chemist, is a permanent staff member of the European Commission, working in the joint research center of the European Commission in Ispra, in North Italy. Ioannis is married to the chemist Dr. Athanasia Tolkou, currently assistant professor at the department of Chemistry of the Democritus University Thrace, Greece.

== Studies ==
He undertook his primary schooling at the Mantoulidis primary school and attended the 1st gymnasium and lyceum of Thessaloniki for his high school and lyceum studies. In 1992 he entered the Department of Chemistry of Aristotle University of Thessaloniki, from which he graduated in 1997. In 1998 he finished his Master of Science studies at Heriot Watt University in Edinburgh (Scotland) in Environmental Pollution Control Management. Following this, he did his PhD at the Aristotle University of Thessaloniki under the supervision of Prof. Zouboulis, on the subject of arsenic removal from groundwaters. During his PhD studies, he obtained a 3-year scholarship from the Greek State Scholarship Foundation (I.K.Y). He also visited Technische Universität Berlin twice, with a short-term research fellowship from the German Academic Exchange Service (DAAD) and worked in Berlin at the research site Marienfelde of Umweltbundesamt. For his PhD studies, in 2006 he received together with Professor Zouboulis the Award of Chemistry from Empirikion Foundation in Athens. In 2003 he served the Greek Army and upon dismissal, he obtained a fellowship from Alexander von Humboldt Stifftung to conduct post doctoral research at Technische Universität Berlin in the group of Professor Martin Jekel, in the field of aquatic chemistry of uranium and its removal from groundwaters.

== Professional career ==
In 2006 he earned a Marie Curie Individual Intra European fellowship to perform research at the water research institute (Eawag) of ETH Zürich in the group of Dr. Stephan Hug. In 2008, he continued at the same Institute, in the group of Professor Urs von Gunten, participating in the TECHNEAU project, which aimed at developing technologies for universal access to safe water. From 2009 to 2014 he worked as supervisor engineer for the giant engineering companies Alstom Power and Hitachi Power Europe, in the commissioning of some of the bigger thermal power plants of Europe, such as the almost 2 GW plant in Pembrokeshire in UK, the totally innovative combined cycle power plant in Modugno in South Italy, the Moorburg thermal power plant in Germany, near Hamburg and the power plant at Maasbracht, in Holland.

He left the industrial field to join the Aristotle University of Thessaloniki, firstly as lecturer and currently as associate professor for environmental Technology. In 2015 he obtained an individual research fellowship from the Swiss National Science Foundation to conduct research in the group of Professor Urs von Gunten at École Polytechnique Fédérale de Lausanne (EPFL) in Switzerland. In the years 2020-2025 he was included in the top 2% of world scientists in the field of Environmental Chemistry published in PLOS Biology and based on citations from SCOPUS. In 2022, Professor Katsoyiannis was appointed director of the Institute of Sustainable Water Management and Water Law of the European Public Law Organization and he was an academic visitor at the University of Ca Foscari in Venezia for the academic year 2023–2025.

== Involvement with the Greek and European Chemical Society ==
Ioannis Katsoyiannis was from January 2022 until December 2024, the President of the Association of Greek Chemists (Ένωση Ελλήνων Χημικών). He was the vice president from 2018 to 2021. From 2018 until 2023, he was chair of the scientific department of Environment, Health and Safety at Work of the Association of Greek Chemists. From November 2015 until November 2018, he was member of the steering committee of the Regional Branch of Central and Western Macedonia of the AGC. Since 2012, he is member of the General Assembly of the Association of Greek Chemists, which meets twice a year in the headquarters of the Association of Greek Chemists in Athens.

Since 2015, he is the delegate of the Association of Greek Chemists to the Division of Chemistry and Environment of the European Chemical Society. From March 2018 until December 2023, he was the chairperson of the Division of Chemistry and Environment of the European Chemical Society. From March 2018 until February 8, 2026, he served as editor for the journal Environmental Science and Pollution Research. and was member of the editorial board for the journal Sustainability (Switzerland) until 2023. From 2018 until 2022, he was member of the selection committee for the historical landmarks of Chemistry, a project organized by EuChemS. From 2018 up to 2021 he was member of the editorial board of the EuChemS quarterly publication Chemistry in Europe. In October 2019 he was elected member of the executive board of EuChemS by the EuChemS general assembly held in Bucharest. and his term ended on 31 December 2023.

== Conference organization and invited lectures ==
On June 9, 2017, he organized the workshop "sustainable water treatment and energy transition", sponsored by the German Academic Exchange Service (DAAD) and the Association of Greek Chemists. Furthermore, he was the chair of the organizing committee of the 2016 Panhellenic Chemistry Conference, which was held in Thessaloniki and attracted more than 1000 participants. In 2019, he was the President of the 17th International Conference of Chemistry and the Environment (ICCE), took place in 2019, in Thessaloniki. This is the official environmental chemistry conference of EuChemS, organized by the division of Chemistry and Environment of EuChemS. The 17th ICCE and took place under the auspices of the president of Hellenic Republic, Professor Dr. Prokopios Pavlopoulos.

He has been invited to give lectures in several conferences and advanced schools across Europe, such as the Panromanian Chemistry Conference, the 10th European Conference on Pesticides in Bologna in Italy in 2018, in the Water Chemistry conference in Torun (Poland), in 2019, and at several Humboldt Kolleg conferences, the Hamburg University of Technology, the University of Istanbul, the University of Insubria. In September 2019, he was invited to give a keynote lecture at the EuChemS conference for Green Chemistry, which took place in Taragona, Spain. In February 2019, he received the award of excellence from the Rector of Aristotle University of Thessaloniki. In 2021, he was invited by the Swiss Chemical Society to give an invited lecture at the 1st scientific meeting of the Environmental Chemistry Section of the Swiss Chemical Society. In 2022, he was invited to deliver a plenary lecture at th 28th Annual Meeting of the Slovenian Chemical Society and on 14 December 2022, he gave a speech at the Zero Pollution Stakeholders Conference, organized by the European Commission at the Berlaymont Building in Brussels. In March 2023, under the capacity of the director of the Institute of Sustainable Water Management and Water Law of the European Public Law Organization, he gave a statement about the world water situation on the third day of the conference during the general debate, in the General Assembly Hall. In December 2023, Prof. Katsoyiannis gave a plenary presentation at the prominent conference 23rd European Meeting on Environmental Chemistry. He attended as an invited keynote speaker the 6th International Environmental Chemistry Congress (EnviroChem), 05-08 November 2024, Trabzon-TURKIYE. Together with colleagues, he organizes the 2nd International Conference on Circularity, Sustainability and Resilience in Water, Wastewater and Sludge Management

== Awards and Fellowships ==
- 2023 - 2025: Academic visitor at the Ca Foscari University, Venice, Italy.
- 02/2019: Award of excellence from the Rector of Aristotle University of Thessaloniki
- 07/2015-09/2015: International research scholarship from the Swiss National Science Foundation
- 07/04-12/05: Research Fellow under the Alexander von Humboldt Foundation in Germany TU intern press
- 01/2006-12/2007: Marie Curie Intra European Individual Fellowship
- The 2006 Chemistry Award from the Empirikion Foundation in Greece.
- DAAD (German Academic Exchange Service): Twice recipient of short research scholarships. Research stay in Berlin.
- 9/96-1/97: Erasmus Exchange Program Scholarship. Studies for one semester at the University of Aberdeen.
- 10/2001: Award from the Mediterranean Scientific Association for Environmental Protection for the best poster presentation in the 11th International Symposium on Environmental Pollution and its impact in the Mediterranean Region, MEASEP and SECOTOX, 6–10 October 2001, Limasol, Cyprus.
- Awards from the European Science foundation to participate in the following workshops and summer schools:
  - Mineral Surface Reactivity, 27/05-1/06/2000, St Feliu de Guixols, Spain (poster presentation).
  - Natural Waters and Water Technology, 07-12/10/2000, Albufera, Portugal (poster presentation).
  - Summer School "Buffer zones for water pollution control", Ghent 29/08-07/09/2001.

== Hellenic Industrial Property Organization ==
Professor Katsoyiannis Ioannis was appointed President of the board of directors of the Hellenic Industrial Property Academy on February 27, 2020, by the Greek Minister of Growth and Investments, Mr. A. Georgiadis. Since October 2019, he is also member of the board of directors of the Greek Organization of Intellectual Property. In June 2022 and again in February 2025, Professor Katsoyiannis was invited to present the activities of the Hellenic Industrial Property Academy in the special permanent committee for research and technology of the Greek Parliament.

== Onassis Foundation ==
Since 2022, Professor Ioannis Katsoyiannis acts as academic advisor for the Onassis Foundation at the department of scholarships, in the field of chemical and environmental engineering.
