= Jnanendranath Gupta =

Indian civil servant (1869–1946)

Jnanendranath Gupta ICS
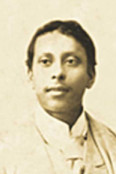
- Born: 1869; Bengal Presidency, British India
- Died: 1946; Bengal Presidency, British India
- Education: Presidency College
- Occupation: administrator
- Known for: Founder of Carmichael College
- Spouse: Sarala Devi (m. 1894)
- Relatives: Romesh Chunder Dutt (father in law)

Jnanendranath Gupta (1869–1946; also known as J. N. Gupta) was a distinguished officer of the Indian Civil Service during the British Indian period, as well as a social reformer and administrator. Inspired by the ideals of the Bengal Renaissance, he served with integrity, humanity, and efficiency in various districts of eastern Bengal (present-day Bangladesh) and western Bengal. His administrative contributions in Noakhali, Rangpur, and Dhaka were particularly notable. While serving in Rangpur, he established Carmichael College in 1916.

== Life and education ==
Jnanendranath Gupta was born in 1869 in Bengal during the British colonial period. His father, Ghanshyam Das Gupta, served as a district judge. Due to his father’s frequent transfers, he spent his childhood in different regions of Bengal and Bihar.

He passed the matriculation examination from Shyampukur School in Calcutta (now Kolkata). He later enrolled at Metropolitan College, where Ishwar Chandra Vidyasagar was serving as the principal, and developed a close and affectionate relationship with him. He obtained his bachelor’s degree with honors in English literature, philosophy, and history, and later earned a master’s degree from Presidency College.

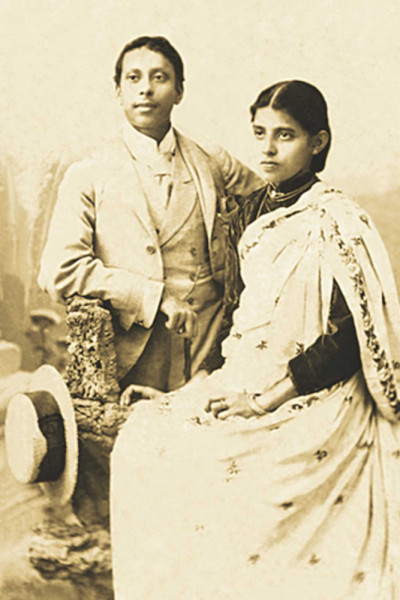
J N Gupta with his wife Sarala, Calcutta, 1895

In 1894, he married Sarala Devi, who was the daughter of the renowned economist and ICS officer Romesh Chunder Dutt.

== Career ==
In his youth, Jnanendranath Gupta stayed in Dakshineswar with Promothanath Kar (Paltu) and had the opportunity to be in the company of eminent personalities such as Ramakrishna, Swami Vivekananda, and Keshub Chandra Sen. During this period, he edited the Bengali monthly magazine Sahitya, to which leading writers of the time, including Rabindranath Tagore, regularly contributed.

In 1891, he traveled to England alongside Deshbandhu Chittaranjan Das and his close college friend G. P. Roy. While in London, he appeared for the Indian Civil Service examination in 1892 and achieved an outstanding result, securing second place among the Indian candidates. The following year, he spent a year at Oxford. Between 1895 and 1896, he served as an ICS officer at Khurda Road in Odisha, during which he frequently visited Cuttack, where his father-in-law, R. C. Dutt, was serving as the Commissioner of Orissa.

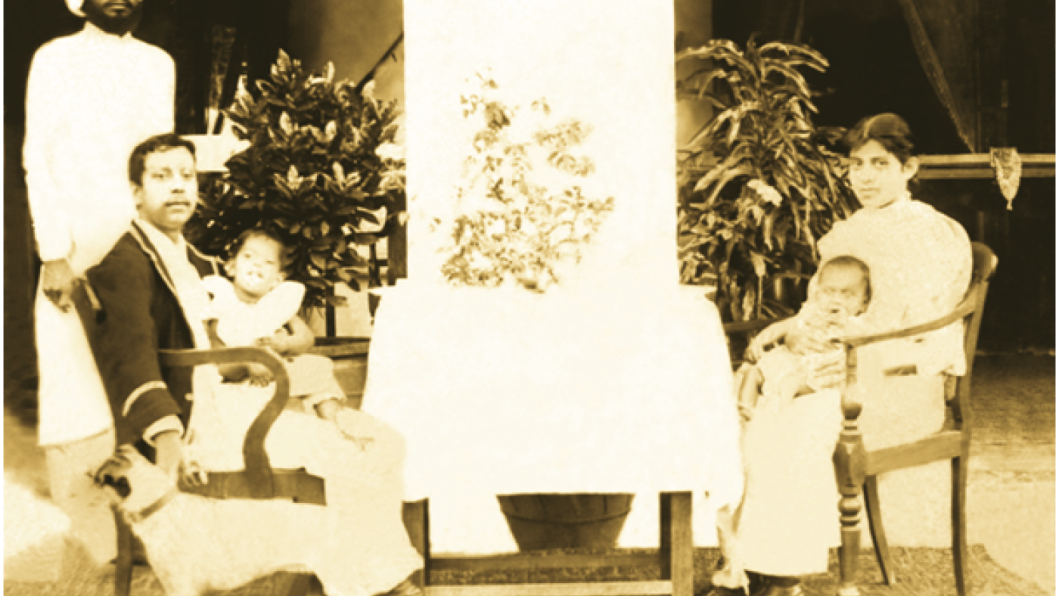
Deputy Magistrate J N Gupta with his wife and children, Noakhali, 1908

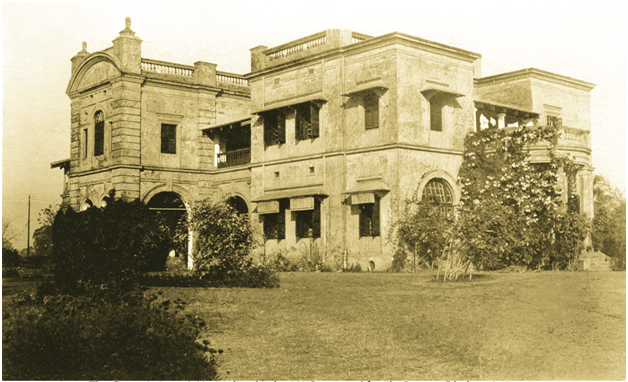
Commissioner's House lived in by JN Gupta Dhaka 1919

He served in important administrative positions across several districts, including Orissa, Malda, Bankura, Burdwan, Noakhali, Rangpur, and Dhaka:

- Noakhali (1908): Served as District Magistrate
- Rangpur (1914–1918): Served as Collector
- Dhaka (1919): Served as Commissioner

While posted in Rangpur, he established Carmichael College in 1916, the first higher education institution in North Bengal, which is now a historic and architectural landmark.

In 1918, when Satyendra Prasanna Sinha departed for England to serve in the British War Cabinet, he invited Jnanendra Nath Gupta to accompany him as his secretary, an offer that Gupta readily accepted. Later, in 1921, Gupta represented India at the League of Nations' Labour Branch in Geneva alongside his longtime friend Sir Atul Chatterjee. Upon his return to Bengal, Sir Surendranath Banerjee, then Minister of Local Self-Government, persuaded him to take on the role of Chairman of the Corporation, reflecting the high regard in which he was held for his administrative ability and public service.

As a member of the Bengal Legislative Council, Jnanendra Nath Gupta firmly opposed the central government's appropriation of Bengal's revenue and rejected the Communal Award. He often disagreed with British Governor Sir John Anderson and consistently upheld his principles, placing India's interests above political convenience.

== Death ==
Jnanendra Nath Gupta passed away in 1946 at the age of 77 due to age-related illness.

== Works ==
- DISTRICT GAZETTEERS OF BENGAL AND ASSAM : BOGRA, 1910
- Life and work of Romesh Chunder Dutt, C.I.E. 1911
- Rangpur Today: a study in local problems of a Bengal district, Jñānendra-Nātha Gupta, 1918
- The Foundations of National Progress: A Scheme of Constructive Work for an Indian Province, with an Introduction by the Rt. Hon'ble Baron Sinha of Raipur, Elm Press, 1927, Cornell University
