= Muhammad Enamul Haq =

Bangladeshi scholar (1902–1982)

Muhammad Enamul Haque SI
- Born: 20 September 1902; Fatikchhari Upazila, Chittagong District, Bengal Presidency, British India
- Died: 16 February 1982 (aged 79)
- Education: Ph.D.
- Alma mater: University of Calcutta
- Awards: full list

Muhammad Enamul Haque (20 September 1902 – 16 February 1982) was a Bangladeshi researcher, litterateur and educationist.

== Early life and education ==
Haque was born on 20 September 1902 in Bakhtpur, Fatikchhari Upazila, Chittagong District, Bengal Presidency, British India. He studied at Raozan High School. As a student he met Ismail Hossain Shiraji who inspired him with nationalism. In 1923, he passed the Entrance Examination. He was awarded a Mohsin scholarship. In 1925, he passed the FA Examination from Chittagong College. He completed his undergraduate in Arabic in 1927 and Masters in 1929 in Oriental languages from the University of Calcutta. From 1929 to 1935, he completed his PhD research on Sufism in Bengal under Suniti Kumar Chatterji.

== Career ==
Haque started working in the Writers' Building in Kolkata as a translator. After which he started teaching at Jorwarganj High School in Meersarai in 1936. He taught in Barasat High School in 1937, Howrah Zilla School in 1941 and Maldah Zilla School in 1942. In 1945, he joined Dhaka Zila School as the headmaster. In 1948, he started as a professor at Rajshahi College. In 1952 he joined Daulatpur College as its principal. In 1954, he was the Professor of Bengali at Rajshahi Government College. Then he worked as the principal of Jagannath College.

In 1955, Haque was made the chairman of the East Bengal School Text Book Board and the next year chairman of East Bengal Secondary Education Board. He served as the first director of Bangla Academy. In 1961 he was the professor of Bengali language at University of Rajshahi. He was the founding director of Kendriyo Bangla Unnayan Board. From 1969 to 1973 he was the supernumerary professor at University of Dhaka in the Bengali language department. He was the chairman of Bangladesh Itihas Parisad. In 1973 he was made a member of the University Grants Commission. In 1975 he was the vice-chancellor of Jahangirnagar University. In 1981 he became a senior fellow of Dhaka Museum.

== Notable writings ==
- Arakan Rajsabhaya Bangla Sahitya (Bengali Literature in the Court of Araken, research work written jointly with Abdul Karim Shahityavisharad), 1935;
- Bange Sufiprabhab (The Influence of Sufism in Bengal, research work), 1935;
- Bangla Bhasar Sangskar (Reform of Bengali language, linguistic), 1944;
- Muslim Bangla Sahitya (Muslim Bengali Literature, research work), 1957;
- A History of Sufism in Bengal, 1976;
- Perso-Arabic Elements in Bengali (with GM Hilali), 1967.

== Awards ==
- Sitara-i-Imtiaz in 1962
- Bangla Academy Literary Award in 1964
- Ekushey Padak in 1979
- President Award in 1966
- Sher-e-Bangla Literary Award in 1980
- Muktadhara and Abdul Hye Literary Awards in 1981
- Independence Day Award in 1983

== Death ==
Haque died on 16 February 1982.
