= Muhammad Enam-Ul Haque =

Bangladeshi historian, writer and academician

- মুহাম্মাদ ইনাম-উল হক

Vice-Chancellor of Islamic University, Bangladesh
- In office 9 May 1995 – 2 September 1997
- Preceded by: Muhammad Abdul Hamid
- Succeeded by: Kayes Uddin

Personal details
- Born: 30 January 1939 Sitakunda Upazila, Chittagong District
- Died: June 6, 2015 (aged 76)
- Children: 3
- Education: University of Chittagong
- Occupation: Professor, university administrator

Muhammad Enam-Ul Haque (January 30, 1939 – June 6, 2015) was a Bangladeshi academician, historian and writer who served as the fourth vice-chancellor of Islamic University, Bangladesh from May 9, 1995, to September 2, 1997. He was also a professor in the Department of Islamic History and Culture at Chittagong University.

== Early life and education ==
Enam-Ul Haque was born January 30, 1939, in the village of Guptakhali in Muradpur union, Sitakunda upazila, Chittagong District to an aristocratic Muslim family. His father, Mawlana Nurul Absar, was a professor in the Arabic department of Feni Government College and translated the book Muntakhab al-Arabi into English. Haque obtained his PhD from Chittagong University in 1973.

== Early career ==
Enam-Ul Haque taught at Rangpur Carmichael College, Chittagong College and Chittagong Government City College before joining Chittagong University in 1980 as a professor in the Department of Islamic History and Culture. He also served as the provost, proctor and chairman of the department, and was commander of the Bangladesh National Cadet Corps at the university for a long time.

=== Vice-chancellorship ===
Enam-Ul Haque was appointed as vice-chancellor of Islamic University on May 9, 1995. He established three major departments, computer science and engineering, electrical and electronic engineering, and applied chemistry & chemical engineering. In 1996, he oversaw creation of the Mukta Bangla sculpture ( Bengali: মুক্তবাংলা,ইবি), which was planned and designed by Rashid Ahmed. He resigned as vice-chancellor September 2, 1997, following protests at the university.

== Later career and death ==
Haque was a member of the National Education Commission for 1996–97. After serving on the commission, he returned to being professor at Chittagong University until retiring in 2007. He was also a life member of Bangladesh History Council, Asiatic Society, Bangla Academy and West Bengal History Council of Calcutta. He was also an advisor to Sitakunda Samiti-Chittagong.

He died aged 76 on the night of June 6, 2015, at United Hospital in Dhaka. Prayers were offered at Dhaka University and Islamic University for the forgiveness of his soul.

The American Biographical Institute published his biography in the 7th, 8th and 9th editions of their International Directory of Distinguished Leadership.

== Bibliography ==
In addition to teaching, Haque published eight research books and many articles in national and international journals. He was proficient in Bengali, English, Arabic, Persian and Urdu.

=== Books ===
- Bengali:
1. History of Bengal: The beginning of the British rule in India (Bengali: বাংলার ইতিহাস : ভারতে ইংরেজ রাজত্বের সূচনাপর্ব). ISBN 984-07-4740-1
2. History of Muslim rule in India (Bengali: ভারতে মুসলিম শাসনের ইতিহাস) ISBN 984-560-203-7
3. Emperor Zahiruddin Muhammad Babar (Bengali: সম্রাট জহিরউদ্দিন মুহাম্মদ বাবর) ISBN 984-560-204-5
4. Emperor Muhiuddin Muhammad Aurangzeb-Alamgir Bahadur(1618-1707) (Bengali: সম্রাট মুহিউদ্দিন মুহাম্মদ আওরঙ্গজেব-আলমগীর বাহাদুর) ISBN 984-560-271-1
5. Muslims and the freedom movement in India (Bengali: ভারতে মুসলমান ও স্বাধীনতা আন্দোলন)
6. Middle East Past and Present (Translate Yahya Armajani Book) (Bengali name: মধ্যপ্রাচ্য অতীত ও বর্তমান) ISBN 984-560-122-7
7. History of modern Turkey and the Middle East (Bengali: আধুনিক তুরস্ক ও মধ্যপ্রাচ্যের ইতিহাস)
8. Small freshwater fish in Bangladesh (Bengali: বাংলাদেশে মিঠা পানির ছোট মাছ)
- English:
1. Society and Culture in Islam (compiled book)
2. A Short History of Muslim Rule in Indo-Pakistan.

=== Publications ===
- Sale Deed of Calcutta Sutanuti and Govindpur: An analysis of the Position of the British.
- Bengal Towards the close of Aurangzeb's Reign.
