= Khoksa Government College =

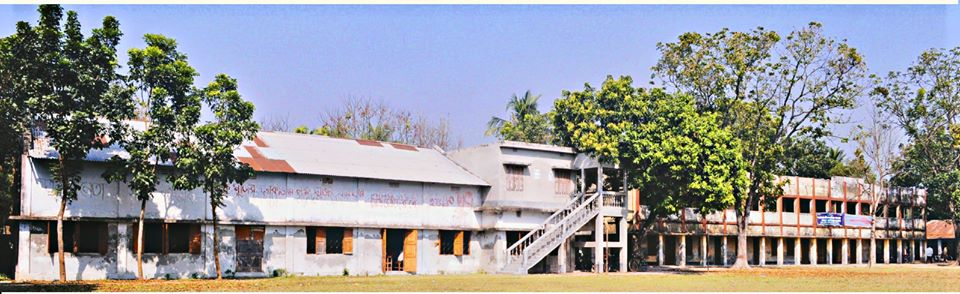
- Type: Government College
- Established: July 1, 1972; 54 years ago
- Affiliations: National University, Bangladesh
- Principal: Abdul Latif
- Location: Khoksa, Janipur-7020, {Bangladesh; 23.8087°N 89.2871°E
- Campus: urban
- Website: kgck.edu.bd

Khoksa Government College (Bengali: খোকসা সরকারি কলেজ) is a government college in Khoksa Upazila of Kushtia District. The college was established in 1972 and officialized in 2017.

== Departments ==
Khoksa Government College offers 3 subjects, 4 types of degree (graduate) courses and 9 honors subjects at higher secondary level.

Degree	No.	Subject
HSC	01	science
HSC	02	Arts
HSC	03	Commerce
graduate	04	B.A.
graduate	05	B.S.S.
graduate	06	B.Sc.
graduate	07	B.B.S.
honors	08	Bangla
honors	09	History and Culture of Islam
honors	10	Social science
honors	11	Political science
honors	12	the economy
honors	13	accounting
honors	14	Management
honors	15	Geography and environment
honors	16	mathematics
