= Monajatuddin =

- মোনাজাতউদ্দিন
- Born: 18 January 1945; Keranipara, Rangpur town, Bengal Presidency, British India
- Died: 29 December 1995 (aged 50); Padma River, Bangladesh
- Education: Rangpur Carmichael College
- Occupation: Journalist

Monajatuddin (18 January 1945 – 29 December 1995) was a Bangladeshi investigative journalist.⁣ He was awarded Ekushey Padak in 1997 by the Government of Bangladesh. In 1995, while investigating two boat capsizing events, he accidentally fell into the water from a ferry on the Padma River and died.

== Early life and education ==
Monajatuddin was born in 1945 to Alimuddin and Motijannesa. He passed matriculation from Rangpur Kolashranjon School and the Intermediate Examination from Rangpur Carmichael College.

== Career ==
Monajatuddin started his career with the Bogra Bulletin in the 1960s. He then worked for a short while with Dainik Purbadesh and Dainik Azad. He then worked for almost 20 years as a regional correspondent in Dainik Sangbad.

== Works ==
- Shah Alam o Maziborer Kahini (1975)
- Path theke Pathe (1991)
- Kansonar Mukh o Sangbad Nepathye (1992)
- Pairaband Shekor Sangbad (1993)

== Awards ==
- Zahur Hosen Gold Medal (1984)
- Philips Award (1993)
- Ekushey Padak (1997)
