= Shahanara Begum =

Bangladeshi politician

- শাহানারা বেগম

Member of the Bangladesh Parliament for Reserved Women's Seat-48
- In office 10 April 2014 – 30 December 2018
- Preceded by: Hasina Mannan
- Succeeded by: Lutfun Nesa Khan

Personal details
- Born: 29 May 1940 Haragachh, British India
- Died: 26 June 2022 (aged 82) Rangpur, Bangladesh
- Party: Jatiya Party (Ershad)
- Occupation: Teacher

Shahanara Begum (1940–2022) was a teacher and a Jatiya Party (Ershad) politician who was a member of parliament from a reserved seat from 2014 to 2018.

== Biography ==
She was born on 29 May 1940 in Haragachh, British India (now in Kaunia Upazila, Rangpur District, Bangladesh). Her father, Mofiz Uddin Ahmed, was a lawyer, and her mother, Amena Khatun, was a teacher.

She matriculated from Rangpur Government Girl's High School. She completed her higher secondary education at Carmichael College.

She earned a BA in Mymensingh, after which she began teaching at Rangpur Government Girls' High School. After completing a B.Ed., she rose to assistant headmistress of the high school in 1984 and headmistress in 1988. She retired in 1997.

After retirement she joined the Jatiya Party (Ershad) and was elected president of the district level of the women's wing of the party. She was elected to parliament from a reserved seat as a Jatiya Party (Ershad) candidate in 2014.

She died on 26 June 2022 in Rangpur.
