= Khairat Hossain =

Bangladeshi politician

Khairat Hossain (14 November 1909 – 10 March 1972) was an Awami League politician and colleague of Sheikh Mujibur Rahman.

== Early life ==
Hossain was born on 14 November 1909 in Barakuti village of Sonarai union of Nilphamari District.

== Career ==
In 1930, Hossain was elected the first Muslim vice president of the student union of the Carmichael College. He was elected member of the Bengal Legislative Assembly from Nilphamari region in 1944.

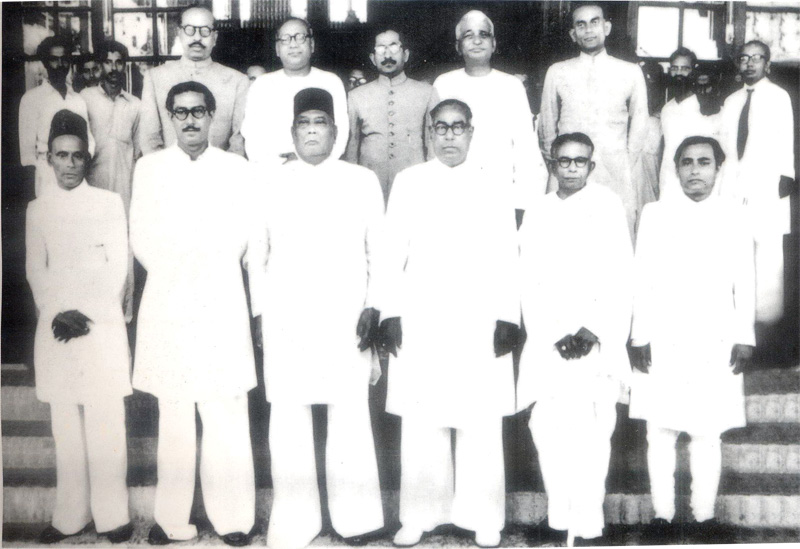
Khairat Hossain in the first person front row left side with the Cabinet of East Bengal, 1954.

In 1952, Hossain called for a discussion on the ban on the Pakistan Observer in the East Bengal Legislative Assembly which was opposed by chief minister of Bengal, Nurul Amin, and rejected by the speaker of the Assembly.

In 1955, Hossain served as Minister of Food, Fish and Animal Husbandry in the United Front cabinet for two and a half years.

== Death ==
Hossain was diagnosed with incurable cancer in 1971 and died in 1972. Khairat Hussain Market, Khairat Hussain Road and Khairat Nagar Railway Station in Nilphamari district bear his memory.
