= Manju Sarkar =

- মঞ্জু সরকার
- Born: 1 September 1953 (age 73); Rangpur, East Bengal, Dominion of Pakistan
- Education: Carmichael College

Manju Sarkar (born 1 September 1953) is a Bangladeshi writer. He is the recipient of Bangla Academy Literary Award (1998).

== Education and career ==
Sarkar studied in Kailash Ranjan High School and Carmichael College. He retired as the publication officer of Jatiya Granthakendra. He then worked as an editor of the Amar Desh and The Daily Ittefaq.

== Works ==
- Amosh (Darkness, 1984)
- Nagno Agontuk (The Naked Guest, 1986)
- Protima Upakkhyan (The Story of Protima, 1992)
- Danrabar Jaiga (Standing Room, 1994)
- Abashbhui (My Homeland, 1994)
- Bhangoner Somoy Bhalobasha (Love in Breaking Times, 1995)
- Mrita (Nectar, 1995)
- Swapnochore (The Dream-Thief, 1997).
- Shinduker Chabi (2009)

== Awards ==
- Philips Award for literature
- Alaol Literary Award
- Agrani Bank Award for Children Literature
- Bogra Lekhak Chakra Award
- Bangla Academy Literary Award (1999)
