= Inamul Haque (scientist) =

Indian chemist (1940-2014)

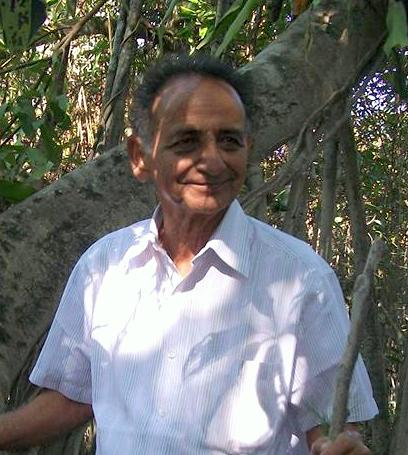
- Born: 1 March 1940; Murabazar, Sivasagar, Assam, India
- Died: 2 February 2014 (aged 73); Dibrugarh, Assam, India
- Citizenship: Indian
- Education: Gauhati University; University of London; Imperial College London
- Scientific career
- Fields: Spectroscopy, Chemistry
- Workplaces: Cotton College, Assam, India; Sibsagar College, Assam; Dibrugarh University; Founder and Rector of Salt Brook Academy

Inamul Haque (Assamese: ইনামুল হক) (1 March 1940 – 2 February 2014) was an eminent Indian-born Lecturer in Chemistry. He was a great visionary as well as a dedicated teacher of Chemistry in Assam. He died on 2 February 2014.

== Early life ==
Inamul Haque was born in a small village of Murabazar of Sivasagar, Assam, India.

== Career ==
He started his career as a lecturer at Cotton College in 1963. Then he joined Sibsagar College (1963 – 65) from where he went to Imperial College London (1965 – 68) to pursue research work. He worked on Spectroscopy and was awarded PhD degree by London University in 1968.

After returning from abroad, he joined Dibrugarh University and retired from there in 2003. During his stay at Dibrugarh University, he produced 15 PhDs under him and published 45 scientific papers in reputed journals. He was entrusted with the responsibility of being a member of the Court, Executive Council, Academic Council, PG Board and UG Board of Dibrugarh University. He also acted as a Vice Chancellor of Dibrugarh University for a brief period.

== Life at Salt Brook Academy ==
After his retirement he joined Salt Brook Academy, Dibrugarh, Assam as a Rector. He devoted his retired life to teach young students to build their future. He was a source of inspiration to every student of Salt Brook Academy. He taught Chemistry there.

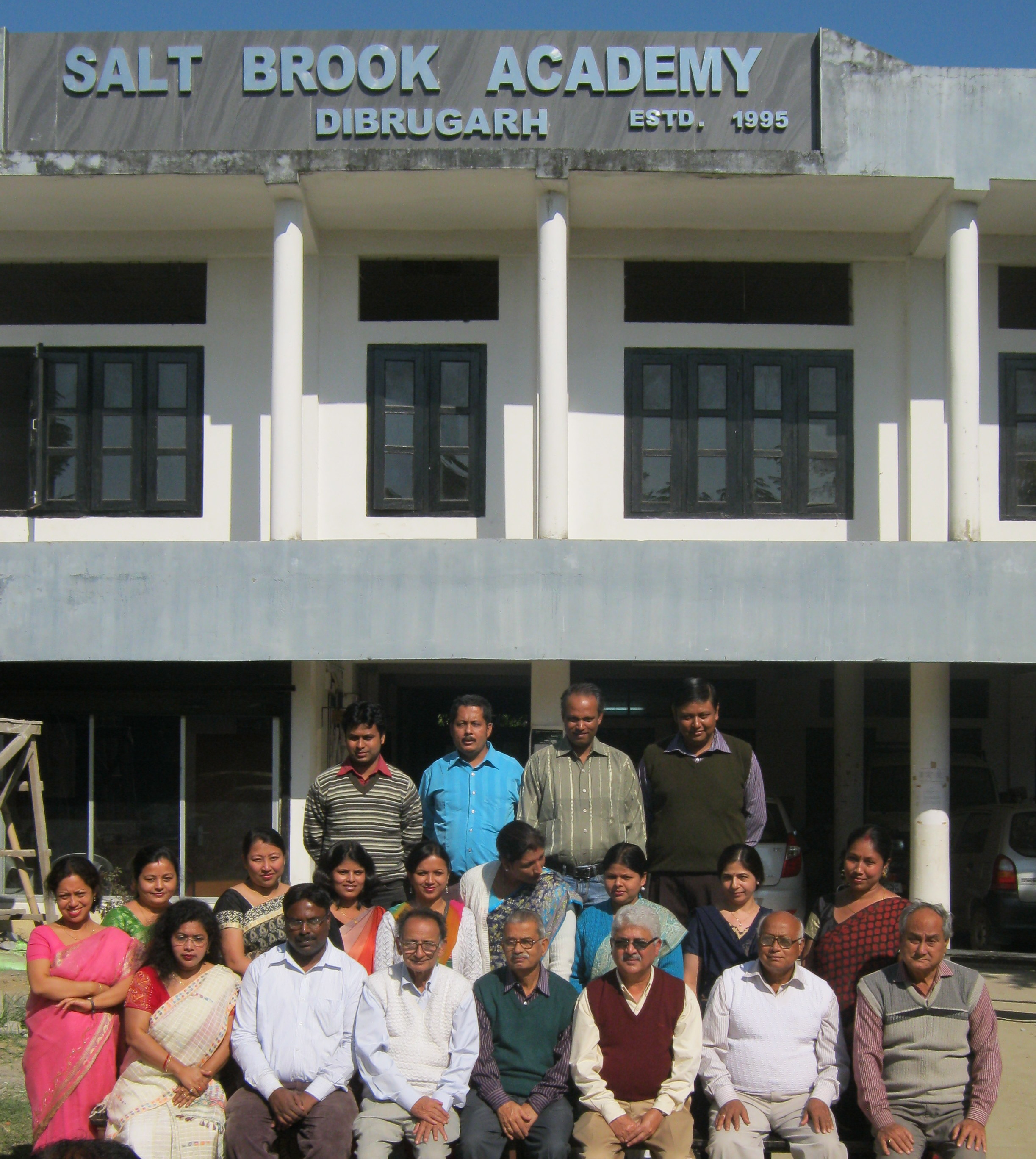
Annual group photo with faculties of Salt Brook Academy, 2011

== Death ==
During his tenure as a Rector at Salt Brook Academy he succumbed to cancer. On 2 February 2014 he took his last breath.
