= Khandaker Golam Mostafa =

Bangladeshi politician (1943–2020)

Member of Bangladesh Parliament
- In office 1979–1986

Personal details
- Political party: Bangladesh Nationalist Party

Khandaker Golam Mostafa (Bengali: খন্দকার গোলাম মোস্তফা) was a Bangladesh Nationalist Party politician and a former member of parliament for Rangpur-11.

== Career ==
Mostafa was elected to parliament from Rangpur-11 as a Bangladesh Nationalist Party candidate in 1979. He was a veteran of Bangladesh Liberation war. He served as the general secretary of the Press Club, Rangpur. He was the editor of Dainik Dabanol.

== Death ==
Mostafa died on 3 September 2020 at Rangpur Medical College Hospital, Rangpur, Bangladesh.
