= Association of Greek Chemists =

Greek chemical society

Association of Greek Chemists (Ένωση Ελλήνων Χημικών)
- Formation: 1924
- Type: Professional association
- Legal status: Active
- Purpose: Advancement of chemistry and support for chemists
- Headquarters: 27 Kaniggos Street, 10682, Athens, Greece
- Members: Open to those with a university degree in chemistry or equivalent
- Official language: Greek
- President: Ioannis Katsoyiannis
- Vice Presidents: Vasilios Koulos, Kostas Theodorakis
- General Secretary: Ioannis Sitaras
- Treasurer and Immediate Past President: Athanasios Papadopoulos
- Website: Official website

The Association of Greek Chemists (Greek: Ένωση Ελλήνων Χημικών, ΕΕΧ) is the chemical society of Greek chemists. The Association of Greek Chemists is a public legal entity that reports to the Ministry of Industry, Energy and Technology.

Its headquarters are in Athens: 27 Kaniggos Street, 10682, Ethans, Greece. It was founded in 1924 in order to act as the Greek government's official advisor on Chemistry related issues.

== History ==
Chemistry has been taught in Greece as a category of natural sciences since the 19th century. In 1837, chemistry was taught in universities by the Bavarian Dr Lanterer, and later by Al. Venizelos and An. Christomanos. The first public analytical laboratory was founded in Lesbos while the island was under Turkish occupation. It worked on the ground floor of the island's city council building until 1902. Dr Stefanidis, its founder, called it «αστυχημείο», and its aim was the control of imported food as well as the local adulterations.

In 1900, the first Greek Analytical Laboratory was founded at Chania, Crete. It was bombed and destroyed in 1941.The Chemistry Department of Athens University and the Chemical Engineering department of the National Technical University of Athens (Greek: Εθνικό Μετσόβιο Πολυτεχνείο, National Metsovian Polytechnic), sometimes known as Athens Polytechnic, were founded in 1918. Six years later, Zoe Mela (Macedonian fighter Pavlos Melas' daughter) wrote the Association of Greek Chemists' founding declaration together with nine more chemists on 31 March at her house (17 Asteriou street, Athens). It was then signed by 53 chemists from the Universities and the Rousopoulos Academy on 4 August 1924.

Mrs Melpo Nikolitsa became the first woman elected into the Association's committee in 1953. In January 1960, all the chemists-applicants for employment as chemistry secondary education teachers are appointed by the Ministry of Education. The Association bought its own office on 14 June 1963, where the headquarters remain until today.

The board of directors of AGC, since January 2022 is the following:

President: Ioannis Katsoyiannis, Vice presidents: Vasilios Koulos and Kostas Theodorakis, General Secretary: Ioannis Sitaras, Treasurer and immediate past president: Athanasios Papadopoulos, Specific Secretary: Ioannis Vafeiadis, Members: Panagiotis Giannopoulos, Vasilios Panagopoulos, Emmanouil Pappas, Andreas Triantafyllakis, Anastasios Korillis

== Membership ==
Registration in the Association of Greek Chemists is obligatory according to the Law 1804/1988 for those who meet the requirements. Members can be those that possess a university degree in chemistry or its equivalent. The equivalency to a University chemistry degree is recognized by a special body (DIKATSA) set up by the Ministry of Education. Those obliged to become members fill in an application form, submit a copy of their University degree or its equivalent and pay the membership fees. The current annual membership fee is 35 euros.

According to the official profile issued by the Association to celebrate its 80-year anniversary in 2004, about 25.65% of the registered members are employed in the public sector; 28% are employed in the private sector (industries, consultants, laboratories etc.); 5% are postgraduate students; 21% are unemployed; and 18% are retired members.

== Flagship magazine ==
One of the benefits of membership is the receipt of the Association's flagship publication, the chimika chronika (chemical chronicles) magazine. It was published by the AGC from 1936 until 1997. In 1998, it was absorbed by the European Journal of Organic Chemistry and the European Journal of Inorganic Chemistry that were created after the merge of various European Chemistry Journals:

- CHemistry: A European Journal
- EurJIC: European journal of Inorganic Chemistry
- EurJOC: European Journal of Organic Chemistry
- ChemBioChem: European Journal of Chemical Biology
- ChemPhysChem: European Journal of Chemical Physics and Physical Chemistry

The magazine has changed its name twice in the past: Chimika Chronika (1936-1968), Chimika Chronika Epistemonike Ekdosis (1969-1970), and Chimika Chronika New Series (1972-1997). It can include commercial advertising.

== Funding Announcements ==
The Association's website is used to announce available funding by government or private bodies.

== Affiliations ==
The AGC is affiliated with a number of professional bodies, such as the Panhellenic Association of Industrial Chemists, the Panhellenic Association of Shipping Chemists, and the Association of employees of the General Chemistry Laboratory.
