= Khoksa =

Town in Khulna Division

Khoksa খোকসা
- Municipality and Town
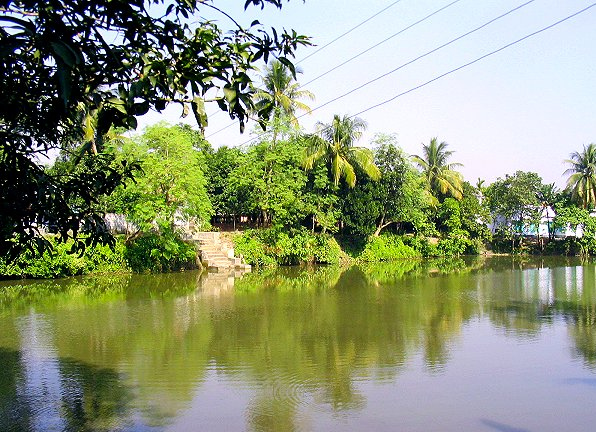
- Pond in Khoksa

- Location in Bangladesh
- Coordinates: 23°48′25″N 89°17′05″E
- Country: Bangladesh
- Division: Khulna Division
- District: Kushtia District

Population (2011)
  - Total: 17,607
- Time zone: UTC+6 (BST)
- Postal code: 7020

Khoksa Municipality mahallah geocode map

Khoksa is a town in Kushtia District in eastern Bangladesh and the headquarters of Khoksa Upazila. It is about 26 kilometres (16 mi) from Kushtia city.

== Geography ==
Khoksa is on the east bank of the Madhumati River.

== Demography ==
According to the 2011 Bangladesh census, Khoksa Municipality had 4,086 households and a population of 17,607. 9.1% of the population was under the age of 5. The literacy rate (age 7 and over) was 58.8%, compared to the national average of 51.8%.

== Transport ==
Khoksha railway station is 5 kilometres (3.1 mi) northeast of town, in Shomospur, on the branch line connecting Poradah and Goalundo Ghat.

Khoksa is on regional highway R710, which connects to the northwest to Kushtia, about 26 kilometres (16 mi) away, and runs east about 50 kilometres (31 mi) to the Faridpur–Daulatdia segment of national highway N7.

== Arts and culture ==
The Kali Puja festival is celebrated annually.

== Education ==
There are two colleges in the town: Khoksa Government College, founded in 1972, and Alhaj Saidur Rahman Mantu Mahila College.

According to Banglapedia, Khoksa Janipur Government Pilot High School, founded in 1910, is a notable secondary school.
