= Inam-ul-Haq (Lahore cricketer) =

Pakistani cricketer

Inam-ul-Haq (born September 8, 1943) was a Pakistani cricketer. He was a right-handed batsman and a right-arm off-break bowler and wicket-keeper. He was born in Lahore.

Inam made his first-class debut in the Quaid-e-Azam Trophy competition of 1969/70, playing for Lahore B, for whom he took one wicket, and scored a duck in the only innings in which he batted.

Inam didn't make another first-class appearance for more than three years, playing for Pakistan Customs. Ul-Haq made six appearances for Pakistan Customs over the next four seasons, achieving a top score of 48 in his final first-class appearance, against Sargodha in 1975/76.

Inam, who started his career in the lower order, moved to the opening order by the end of his career.
