= Bangladesh Chemical Society =

Research institute in Bangladesh

- Formation: 1973
- Headquarters: Dhaka, Bangladesh
- Region served: Bangladesh
- Official language: Bengali
- Website: Bangladesh Chemical Society

Bangladesh Chemical Society is a learned society of chemistry and chemical Engineers. it is the National adhering organizations in Bangladesh.

== History ==
Bangladesh Chemical Society was founded in 1972 following the Independence of Bangladesh in 1972 by faculty members of the University of Dhaka such as Mokarram Hussain Khundker. Founding members also included professors from the University of Rajshahi, Bangladesh University of Engineering and Technology, and Bangladesh Council of Scientific and Industrial Research. The purpose of the society is to generate interest in the study of chemistry and promote collaborations among chemical Engineers in Bangladesh. The society holds conferences and seminars on chemical Engineering . It publishes an academic journal and gives awards to notable papers published by Bangladeshi chemist and chemical Engineers.
