= Bangladesh Itihas Parisad =

Research institute in Bangladesh

- Formation: 1966
- Headquarters: Dhaka, Bangladesh
- Region served: Bangladesh
- Official language: Bengali

Bangladesh Itihas Parisad is a collective organization of historians and researchers in Bangladesh.

== History ==
Bangladesh Itihas Parisad was formed in 1966. it was the first historical association of Bangladesh. The aim of the organization is the promotion of historical publications written in Bengali language. The organizations holds conferences and seminars on history in Bangladesh. It awards best published works of history in Bangladesh. As of 2023, Bangladesh Itihas Parisad has 33 members.
