= Urs von Gunten =

Swiss environmental chemist

Professor Urs von Gunten
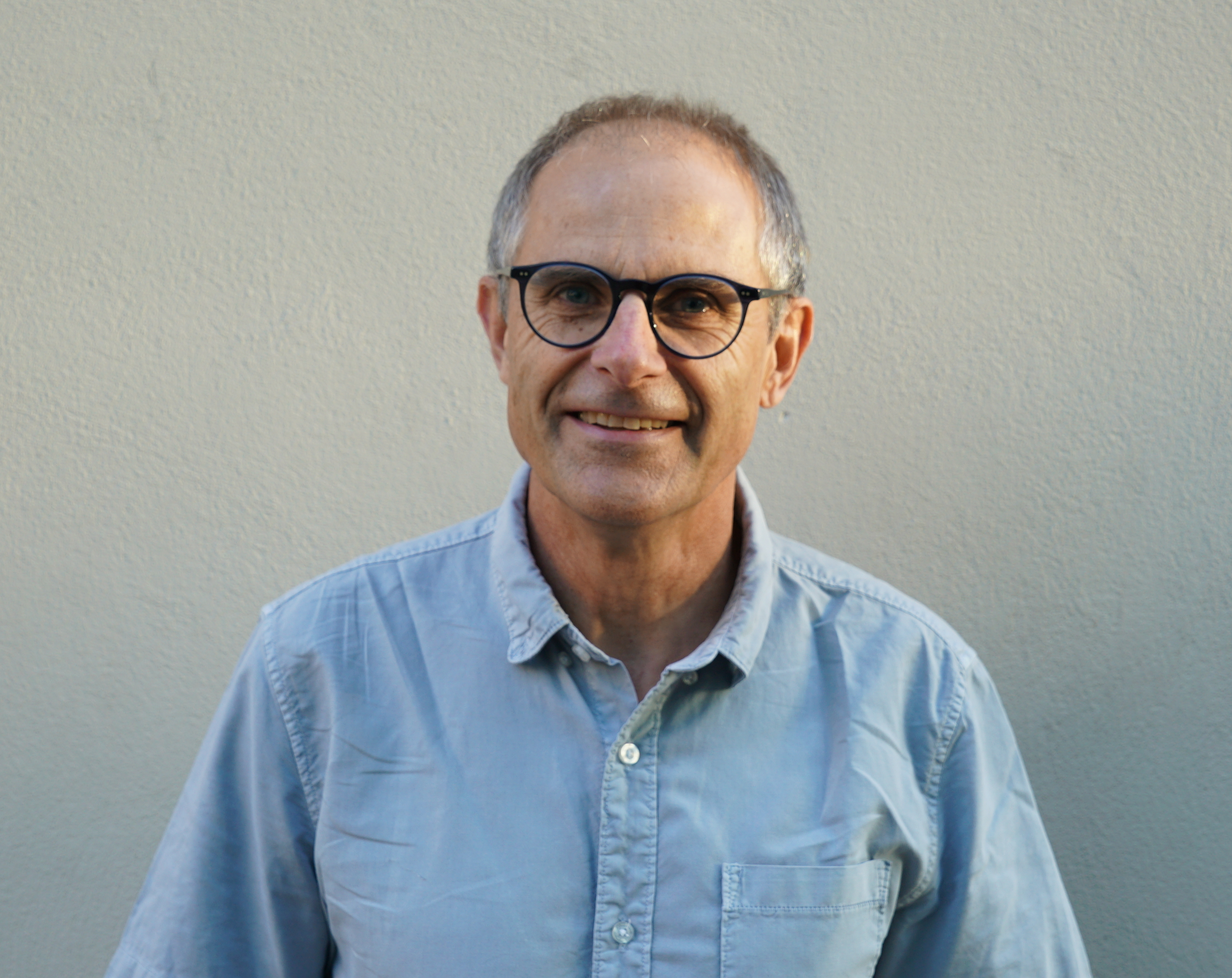
- Urs von Gunten in 2018
- Born: October 20, 1959 (age 66); Baden, Switzerland
- Known for: Drinking water treatment

Academic background
- Education: ETH Zurich

Academic work
- Discipline: Environmental chemistry
- Sub-discipline: Chemical treatment of drinking water
- Institutions: École Polytechnique Fédérale de Lausanne (EPFL)
- Website: https://www.epfl.ch/labs/ltqe/

Urs von Gunten (born 20 October 1959) is a Swiss environmental chemist and a professor at EPFL (École Polytechnique Fédérale de Lausanne). He is known for his research in the fields of drinking water quality and water treatment.

== Career ==
Urs von Gunten obtained a diploma in chemistry in 1983 and a PhD in inorganic chemistry in 1989 from ETH Zurich. He then performed post-doctoral work at the Swiss Federal Institute of Aquatic Science (Eawag), where he became head of the chemistry department (1998–1999) and of the Water Resources and Drinking Water department (2000–2004). He then took the lead of the cross-disciplinary project 'Drinking Water for the 21st century' until 2008, was the head of the transdisciplinary project “Regional Water Supply Basel Country 21” (2013–2016) and of the competence center for drinking water (2010–2017) at Eawag.

Urs von Gunten was appointed lecturer at ETH Zurich in 1995 and an adjunct professor in 2006. He was a visiting scientist at the University of Colorado in Boulder (2000–2001), and a visiting professor at the Curtin University in Perth, Australia (2008–2009) and at the University of California, Berkeley (2017–2018). In 2011, he was nominated full professor at EPFL (École Polytechnique Fédérale de Lausanne).

== Research ==
Urs von Gunten heads the laboratory for Water Quality and Treatment (LTQE) at EPFL and the drinking water chemistry group at Eawag. His research focuses on oxidation and disinfection processes in the context of drinking water and waste water treatments. He has notably extensively studied the formation of potentially toxic chemical byproducts upon drinking water ozonation and chlorination. In a Perspective article published in the journal Science in 2011, von Gunten warned that water chlorination may lead to the formation of hazardous disinfection by-products through oxidation of substrates originating from organic matter and pharmaceuticals. He later advocated that chlorination could be foregone altogether, should adequate protective measures for water sources and distribution networks be taken. von Gunten has also explored novel treatment modalities to remove halide ions from bromide and iodide-containing water. In 2018, he published a highly cited perspective article on oxidation processes, summarizing the options and limitations of this treatment. von Gunten co-authored a book on ozone chemistry together with Clemens von Sonntag in 2012.

Urs von Gunten has also tackled the role of climate change and other anthropogenic factors on drinking water quality.

== Distinctions ==
Urs von Gunten received the Harvey Rosen Award in 2001, 2007 and 2015 from the International Ozone Association, as well as the Environmental Science and Technology Excellence in Review Award in 2007. It is announced, that he will receive the ACS Award for Creative Advances in Environmental Science and Technology in 2022.

In 2007, he received an Honorary Professorship at the Harbin Institute of Technology. He has been an adjunct professor at the Gwangju Institute of Science and Technology since 2012. In 2015, he received a professorship under the Chinese Academy of Sciences President's International Fellowship Initiative for Distinguished Scientists.

As of 2021, his research papers have been cited more than 38,000 times and his h-index is 97. He was a highly cited researcher according to Thomson Reuters Web of Science in 2014 and 2015, and according to Clarivate Analytics in 2018, 2019, 2020 and 2021.
