= Miss World Bangladesh =

Annual beauty pageant

- Predecessor: Miss Bangladesh
- Formation: 2017
- Type: Beauty pageant
- Headquarters: Dhaka
- Location: Bangladesh
- Members: Miss World; Mister World; Miss International; Miss Cosmo
- Official language: Bengali; English
- National Director: Azra Mahmood
- Parent organisation: Antar Showbiz (2017-2018); Omnicon Group (2019, 2024); Azra Mahmood Talent Camp (2025-Present)
- Website: missworldbangladesh.net mrworldbd.com

Miss World Bangladesh is a national beauty pageant in Bangladesh that annually selects representatives to compete in Miss World, one of the Big Four international beauty pageants. The competition is a continuation of the Miss Bangladesh pageant which had selected Bangladesh's representative to the Miss World pageant from 1994 up until 2001.

The Reigning Miss World Bangladesh is Samanzar Sayeed who was crowned by the outgoing titleholder Aklima Atika Konika.

The Reigning Mr World Bangladesh is B Proshad Das who was sashed by the outgoing titleholder Mahadi Hassan Fahim.

== Background ==
Omicon Entertainment and Antar Showbiz jointly created Miss World Bangladesh to be the country's first nationwide pageant for 2 years ( 2017–2018 ). The event's mission is to support the empowerment of women and the opportunity to represent Bangladesh at an international level, from 2019 Omicon Entertainment has got the license, and they holding the event professionally.

In October 2017, Jannatul Nayeem Avril became the first winner of Miss World Bangladesh. She was dethroned a week later, after it was discovered that she was not 26, but 27 years old and had been previously married. Jessia Islam, the runner-up, took over the title and had the rights to represent Bangladesh at Miss World 2017.

== Titleholders ==
Color key

- Declared as Winner
- Ended as runner-up
- Ended as finalist or semifinalist.

Year	Miss World Bangladesh	Hometown	Placement at Miss World	Special Awards
2017
2017	Jannatul Nayeem Avril	Dethroned after being discovered that she was previously married		
2017	Jessia Islam	Dhaka	Top 40	
2018	Jannatul Ferdous Oishee	Barishal	Top 30	
2019	Rafah Nanjeba Torsa	Chittagong	Unplaced	Head to Head Challenge (Top 20)
Did not compete Miss World 2022				
2024	Shammi Islam Nila	Dhaka	Unplaced	
2025	Aklima Atika Konika	Dhaka	Unplaced	Talent (Top 48)
2026	Samanzar Sayeed	Dhaka	Unplaced	BWAP (Top 24- Asia & Oceania top 06)

== Mr World Bangladesh ==
- : Declared as Winner
- : Ended as runner-up or top 5/6 qualification
- : Ended as one of the finalists or semifinalists
- : Ended as special awards winner

Year	District	Mr World Bangladesh	Placement at Mr World	Special Awards
2024	Dhaka	B Proshad Das	Unplaced	
2019	Chittagong	Mahadi Hassan Fahim	Unplaced	

== Miss Bangladesh World (1994-2007) ==
Color key

- Declared as Winner
- Ended as runner-up
- Ended as finalist or semifinalist.

Year	Miss Bangladesh	Placement at Miss World	Special Awards
1994	Anika Taher	Unplaced	
1995	Yasmin Bilkis Sathi	Unplaced	
1996	Rehnuma Dilruba Chitra	Unplaced	
Did not compete Miss World 1997			
1998	Shaila Simi	Did not compete	
1999	Tania Rahman Tonni	Unplaced	
2000	Sonia Gazi	Unplaced	
2001	Tabassum Ferdous Shaon	Unplaced	
2007	Jannatul Ferdous Peya	Did not compete	

== See also ==
- Miss Bangladesh
- Miss Universe Bangladesh
- Miss Earth Bangladesh
- Miss Grand Bangladesh
