= Hiam Amani Hafizuddin =

American entrepreneur, beauty queen and PR professional

Hiam 'Amani' Hafizuddin
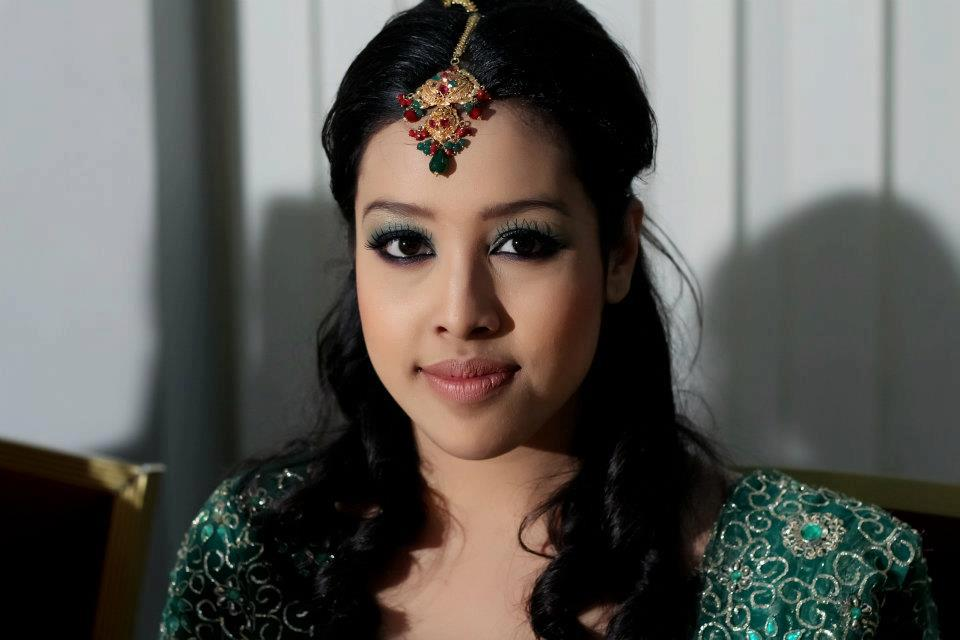
- Born: Chicago, Illinois, United States of America
- Education: University of Illinois Urbana-Champaign
- Occupations: Public relations professional, entrepreneur
- Known for: Founder of Miss Bangladesh US Organization

Hiam 'Amani' Hafizuddin is an American entrepreneur, public relations professional and beauty pageant titleholder. She is the founder and president of the Miss Bangladesh US Organization (formerly Miss Bangladesh USA). She founded the organization at the age of eighteen and, at nineteen, became the national director for Miss Asia Pacific International, Asia's oldest international beauty pageant. In 2025, she received the Gold Award in the Bangladesh category as an independent strategist at Provoke Media's SABRE Awards South Asia for her work in branding and communications.

== Pageantry ==
=== Miss Bangladesh US Organization ===
While in her first semester of her freshman year studying business at the University of Illinois Urbana-Champaign, Hafizuddin founded the Miss Bangladesh US pageant.

She has cited the values of pageantry, particularly women's empowerment and advocacy, as motivating factors behind its creation. At the time, with no formal national pageants available for women of Bangladeshi descent, she launched Miss Bangladesh USA, which later became renamed Miss Bangladesh US Organization.

In 2024, she led a digital-first rebrand of Miss Bangladesh US Organization into a media and talent management agency. Through this, she and other professionals from various industries have led workshops focused on professional development for Bangladeshi women, including topics related to career readiness and higher education.

=== Miss World America ===
In July 2016, Hafizuddin competed in the Miss World America competition, representing the state of Illinois. She received international media coverage leading up to the competition for being the first woman of Bangladeshi descent to participate in the United States' national pageant for Miss World. Her selection was featured in several media outlets, including NBC News and in Bangladeshi diaspora media for being the first Miss World America delegate of Bangladeshi heritage.

=== Miss Asia Pacific International ===
Hiam is the official National Director of Bangladesh for Miss Asia Pacific International. In 2016, at the age of 19, she became the franchise holder and national director, overseeing Bangladesh's debut in the competition. This was also the first time in several years that Bangladesh participated in a major international pageant. In 2018, her candidate Marjana Chowdhury placed in the top 20, achieving Bangladesh's highest placement in international pageantry to date.

=== Miss Grand International ===
In 2021 and 2022, Hiam served as the official National Director of Bangladesh and Pakistan for Miss Grand International. Through her licensee of the franchise, she facilitated Bangladesh's debut participation in 2021 with the appointment of Marjana Chowdhury as the first Miss Grand Bangladesh.

In that same year, she also marked the return of Pakistan by crowning Ramina Ashfaque as Miss Grand Pakistan 2021.

In 2022, she crowned Towhida Tusnim Tifa of Gazipur, Bangladesh as Miss Grand Bangladesh, the first Bangladeshi national to represent the country at Miss Grand International. She also crowned Aneesa Sheikh from New York to represent Pakistan.

In 2024, Hiam launched Roma Michael as Miss Grand Pakistan, the first Pakistani national to represent the country at Miss Grand International. Roma Michael competed at the 2024 edition of the pageant held in Cambodia and Thailand, where her participation drew media coverage and online discussion.

=== Miss Face of Beauty International ===
In 2023, Hiam became the official National Director of Bangladesh for Face of Beauty International. Through an online national competition, Dr. Tasin Afrin Diana was crowned Miss Face of Beauty Bangladesh 2024 on International Women's Day.

In 2025, Hiam and the Miss Bangladesh US Organization joined forces with Bangladesh Tourism Beauty to crown Irana Ishrat as Miss Face of Beauty Bangladesh 2025.

=== Miss Supranational ===
Hiam was the official National Director of Bangladesh for Miss Supranational in 2024. Under her leadership, Bangladesh made its debut at Miss Supranational 2024. Towhida Tusnim Tifa was crowned the first Miss Supranational Bangladesh during an official press conference and crowning ceremony held in Dhaka, Bangladesh in May 2024.

== Awards and recognition ==
In 2025, Hafizuddin was named the Gold Winner in the Bangladesh category at the SABRE Awards South Asia held in New Delhi, India for her independently led campaign “Empowering Women, Evolving Lives,” on behalf of the Miss Bangladesh US Organization. The campaign was also a finalist and Certificate of Excellence recipient in the International category. Additionally, the campaign received recognition at the 2025 IN2 SABRE Awards South Asia in the Owned Media – Website and Mobile App Development category. She was also named a Finalist for the Indian Sub-continent category at the SABRE Awards Asia Pacific 2025 held in Singapore.
