= 28th Bangladesh National Film Awards =

National Film Awards, Bangladesh

- Awarded for: Best of Bangladeshi cinema in 2003
- Awarded by: President of Bangladesh
- Presented by: Ministry of Information
- Presented on: 23 October 2008
- Site: Bangladesh-China Friendship Conference Centre, Dhaka, Bangladesh
- Hosted by: Alamgir and Farzana Brownia
- Official website: moi.gov.bd

Highlights
- Best Feature Film: Not Given
- Best Actor: Manna; Bir Soinik
- Best Actress: Sadika Parvin Popy; Karagar
- Most awards: Kokhono Megh Kokhono Brishti (3)

The 28th National Film Awards were presented by the Ministry of Information, Bangladesh, to felicitate the best of Bangladeshi cinema released in the year 2003. The Bangladesh National Film Awards is a film award ceremony in Bangladesh established in 1975 by the government of Bangladesh. Every year, a national panel appointed by the government selects the winning entry, and the award ceremony is held in Dhaka. Chief Adviser Fakhruddin Ahmed presented the awards at the Bangladesh-China Friendship Conference Centre on 23 October.

== List of winners ==
A 12-member jury board headed by Sadeq Khan, chairman of the board of directors, Press Institute of Bangladesh, suggested the names of 15 artistes for the National Film Award in recognition of their outstanding contributions to the country's film industry. No awards were given in the best film, director, music director, dialogue, cinematography, and editing categories.

=== Merit awards ===
Name of Awards	Winner(s)	Film
Best Actor	Manna	Bir Soinik
Best Actress	Sadika Parvin Popy	Karagar
Best Actor in a Supporting Role	Wasimul Bari Rajib and Sohel Rana	Sahoshi Manush Chai
Best Actress in a Supporting Role	Saathi	Bir Soinik
Best Actor in a Negative Role	Kabila; Shanu	Ondhokar; Bou Shashurir Juddho
Best Actor in a Comic Role	Dildar	Tumi Shudhu Amar
Best Child Artist	Priyanka	Kokhono Megh Kokhono Brishti
Best Lyrics	Gazi Mazharul Anwar	Kokhono Megh Kokhono Brishti
Best Male Playback Singer	Bashir Ahmad	Kokhono Megh Kokhono Brishti
Best Female Playback Singer	Baby Naznin	Sahoshi Manush Chai

=== Technical awards ===
Name of Awards	Winner(s)	Film
Best Story	Gias Uddin Selim	Adhiar
Best Screenplay	Maqsudul Bari	Adhiar
Best Art Director	Mohammad Kalantor	Dui Bodhu Ek Swami

== See also ==
- Bachsas Awards
- Meril Prothom Alo Awards
- Ifad Film Club Award
- Babisas Award
