= Bachsas Award for Best Female Playback Singer =

The Bachsas Award for Best Female Playback Singer is awarded by the Bachsas (Bangladesh Cholochitra Sangbadik Samity) Awards in Bangladesh. The following is a list of its winners:

== Year-wise winners of this award ==
Here is a list of the award winners and the films for which they won.

Year	Actress	Film
1981	Samina Chowdhury	Jonmo Theke Jolchhi
1982	Runa Laila	Devdas
1983	Sabina Yasmin	Pran Sajani
1984	Samina Chowdhury	Noyoner Alo
1985	Sabina Yasmin	Shuvo Ratri
1986	Nilufar Yasmin	Parineeta
1987	Sabina Yasmin	Rajlakshmi Srikanto
1988	Runa Laila	Swami
1999	Rumana Islam Kanak Chapa	Bhalobashi Tomake
2000	Rumana Islam Kanak Chapa	Kosto
2001	Rumana Islam Kanak Chapa	Premer Taj Mahal
2002	Baby Naznin	
2003	Baby Naznin	
2005	Anupama Mukti	Hajar Bachar Dhare
2008	Samina Chowdhury	Chandragrohon
2009	Rumana Islam Kanak Chapa	Gangajatra
2010	Rezwana Chowdhury Banya	Gohine Shabdo
2011	Shimul Yusuf	Guerrilla
2012	Runa Laila	Raja Shurjo Kha
2013	Sabina Yasmin	Eve Teasing
2014	Lehat Lemis	Agnee
2015	Elita Karim	Padmo Patar Jol
2016	Sithi Saha	Bhola Toh Jayna Tare
2017	Momtaz Begum	Swatta
2018	Akhi Alamgir	Ekti Cinemar Golpo

== Superlatives ==
- Oldest Winner - Runa Laila (60) and Sabina Yasmin (60)
- Youngest - Samina Chowdhury (17)

Most Awards

- Rumana Islam Kanak Chapa and Sabina Yasmin - 4
- Runa Laila and Samina Chowdhury - 3
- Baby Naznin - 2
