= Meghna Alam =

Bangladeshi model and politician

- Born: 2 October
- Education: Viqarunnisa Noon School and College; North South University
- Occupation: Politician
- Organization: Bangladesh Nationalist Party
- Height: 5 ft 3 in (1.60 m)
- Beauty pageant titleholder
- Title: Miss Earth Bangladesh 2020
- Years active: 2014–present
- Major competitions: Miss Earth Bangladesh 2020 (Winner); Miss Universe Bangladesh 2019 (Top 18); Miss World Bangladesh 2023 (Top 20)

Meghna Alam is a Bangladeshi politician and model who won the title of Miss Earth Bangladesh in 2020.

== Early life ==
She completed her HSC at Viqarunnisa Noon School and College and graduated from North South University with a BBA degree.

== Career ==
Alam served as an ambassador for One Young World, a global youth leadership platform. She also worked as a political educator and women leadership trainer.

She was crowned Miss Earth Bangladesh in 2020 and represented Bangladesh as its first-ever delegate at Miss Earth 2020.

She is currently employed as the chairperson of the Miss Bangladesh Foundation. She is also the founder and the CEO of Ekottro Foundation.

=== Political career ===
Alam joined Bangladesh Nationalist Party in 2026. She contested to be a member of parliament in the 13th National Parliament election from the Dhaka-8 constituency nominated by Gono Odhikar Parishad and received 608 votes.

== Controversies ==
On 10 April 2025, Alam was put in 30-day detention under the Special Powers Act, 1974 which allows for detention without trial. The state accused her of operating a "fraud ring" that used to honey trap influential foreign figures. She and three other individuals were also accused of demanding $5 million from a diplomat. On 17 April 2025, the court granted a petition to show her as arrested in that case. Police formally charged her with cheating, extortion, and abetment, stating her actions threatened Bangladesh's state security and international relations. Though her father alleged that she was detained because she refused a marriage proposal from the Saudi ambassador. She received bail on 28 April 2025, after 19 days of detention.

The detention process was criticized by many, including the adviser for law, Asif Nazrul. Amnesty International also expressed concerns over her detention.

== Personal life ==
Alam was dating Yousef Essa Al Duhailan, the Saudi Arabian ambassador to Bangladesh. She claimed that they are engaged.
