= Jessia Islam =

Bangladeshi model (born 1997)

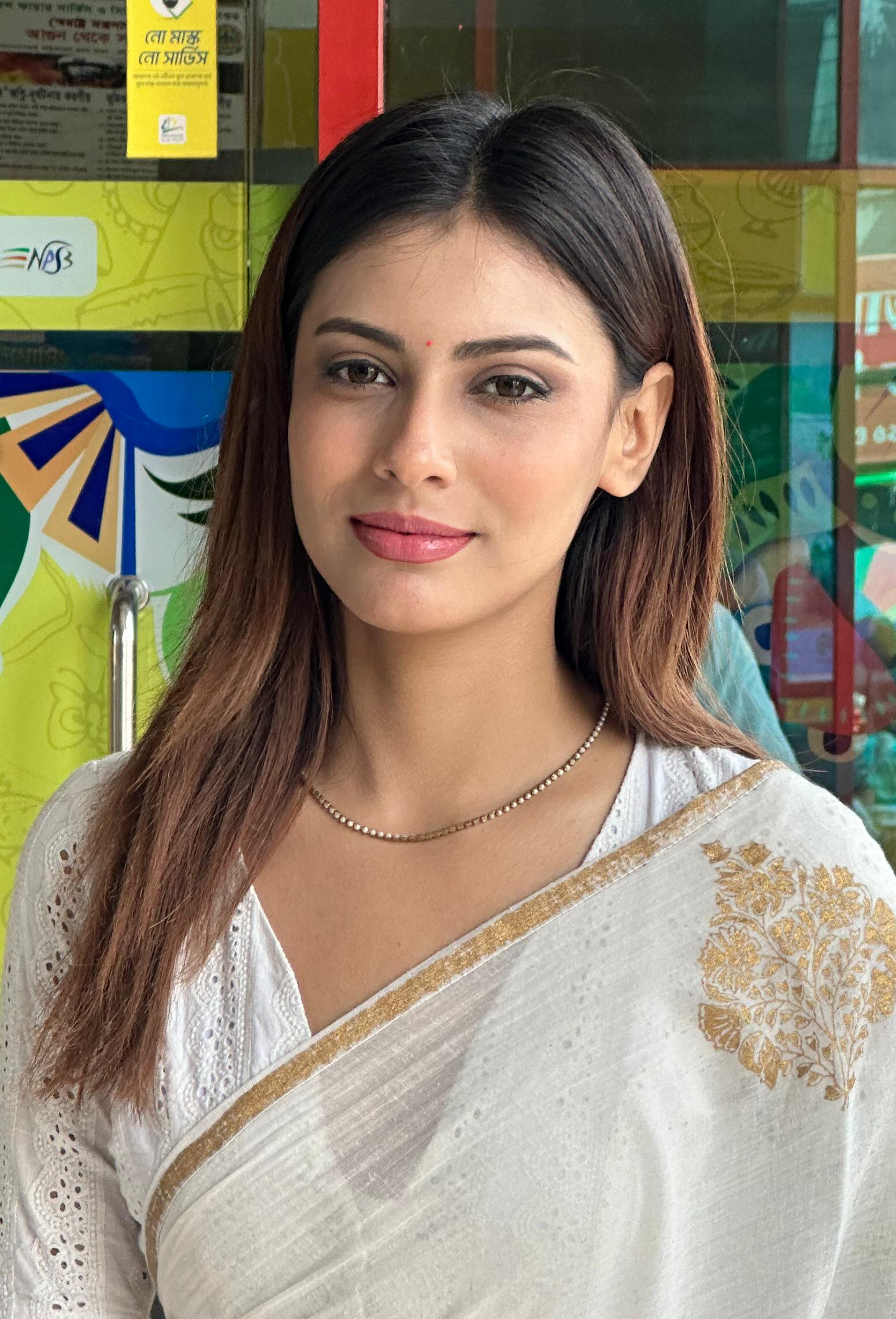
- Islam in 2024
- Born: Dhaka, Bangladesh
- Occupation: Model
- Height: 172 cm (5 ft 7 1/2 in)
- Beauty pageant titleholder
- Title: Miss World Bangladesh 2017; Miss Charm Bangladesh 2023; Miss Grand Bangladesh 2024; Miss International Bangladesh 2025
- Major competitions: Miss World Bangladesh 2017; (Winner; assumed); Miss World 2017; (Top 40); Miss Universe Bangladesh 2019; (2nd Runner-Up); Miss Charm 2023; (Unplaced); Miss Grand International 2024; (Unplaced); Miss International Bangladesh 2025; (Winner); Miss International 2025; (Unplaced)

Jessia Islam (Bengali: জেসিয়া ইসলাম) is a Bangladeshi model, actress and beauty pageant titleholder who won Miss World Bangladesh 2017, Miss Charm Bangladesh 2023, Miss Grand Bangladesh 2024 and Miss International Bangladesh 2025. She represented Bangladesh at Miss World 2017 where she reached the top 40.

== Career ==
=== Modeling ===
Islam began her career in modelling at the age of 16. She has modelled for brands including, Yellow (Beximco), PREALI, Cats Eye, Raw Nation, Oppo, Infinix Mobile, and Nippon Paint. She also participated in the Tresemme Bangladesh Fashion Week.

=== Pageantry ===
Islam competed at Miss Bangladesh 2017. She was first runner-up, but became Miss Bangladesh after the original titleholder, Jannatul Nayeem Avril was discovered to have been previously married. Islam went on to represent Bangladesh at the Miss World 2017 competition. At Miss World, Islam won group six of the head-to-head challenge, which placed her in the top 40. She was also the runner-up for the People's Choice Award.

She also participated in Miss Charm 2023 and Miss Grand International 2024 where she went unplaced

Islam participated in Miss International 2025 where she went unplaced but won the title of Best in Evening Gown.

=== Acting ===
In 2022, Islam made her film debut in MR9: Do or Die, and has also appeared in other films, such as Dorod.

== Social activity ==
Islam is actively involved in social work and has collaborated with various NGOs, including Poriborton Kori.

== Filmography ==
- MR9: Do or Die (2022)
- Dorod

== Awards ==
- Bangladesh Model Star Award at the Asia Model Festival.

Awards and achievements
Preceded by Jannatul Ferdoush Peya	Miss Bangladesh; 2017	Succeeded by Jannatul Ferdous Oishee
