= Shahnoor (disambiguation) =

- Shahnoor, Bangladeshi actress
- Shahnoor Studios, a film studio in Pakistan

== See also ==
- Shahnour (Armenian personal name)
