= Zahara Mitu =

Bangladeshi film actress and presenter

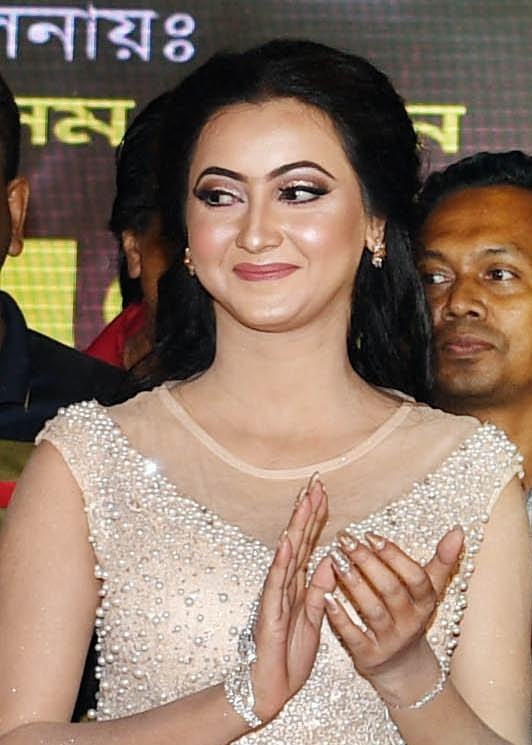
- Mitu in 2019
- Born: Fatematuz Zahara Mitu; 20 June; Chittagong, Bangladesh
- Occupations: Actress; presenter; model
- Years active: 2017–present

Fatematuz Zahara Mitu (Bengali: জাহারা মিতু) is a Bangladeshi film actress and presenter. She started her career with the 2017 Miss World Bangladesh beauty pageant. In 2019, she made her acting debut in the Bangladeshi film Agun, which is yet to release. In 2023, Mitu's performance in Joy Bangla was her first to be widely distributed in theaters. (Note: multiple sources:)

== Early life ==
Mitu born on 20 June in Chittagong.

== Career ==
In 2019, Mitu started her career with the 2017 Miss World Bangladesh beauty pageant. In October 2019, Mitu started her career as an actress in Dhallywood movie Agun, directed by Shakib Khan. In 16 December 2022, Mitu's performance in Joy Bangla was her first to be widely distributed in theaters.

== Filmography ==
Key
†	Denotes films that have not yet been released

Year	Film	Role	Notes	Ref.
2022	Joy Bangla	Dhola	Debut film; based on Bangladesh Liberation War	(Note: multiple sources:)
2023	Shatru	Priyonti		(Note: multiple sources:)
2025	Kustigir	Jhinuk	Released on iScreen	(Note: multiple sources:)
2026	Agun †	TBA	Post-production	(Note: multiple sources:)
TBA	Commando †	TBA	Unreleased	(Note: multiple sources:)
TBA	The Doll-Death of Living Legend †	TBA	Filming	(Note: multiple sources:)
TBA	Jersey Number 16 †	TBA	Filming	(Note: multiple sources:)

=== Television ===
Year	Title	Role	Notes	Ref.
2021	Natokbuzz	Prakrity	Released on Nagorik TV	

== See also ==
- list of Bangladeshi actresses
