= Premik Number One =

Bangladeshi romantic drama film

- Theatrical released poster
- Directed by: Rakibul Islam Rakib
- Screenplay by: Rakibul Alam Rakib
- Story by: Abdullah Zahir Babu
- Produced by: Anwar Hossain Mintu
- Starring: Shakib Khan; Apu Biswas; Nipun Akter; Misha Sawdagor
- Cinematography: Asaduzzaman Majnu
- Edited by: Touhid Hossain Chowdhury
- Music by: Ali Akram Shuvo; Emon Saha
- Distributed by: Sadia Sohan Kothachitra
- Release date: 16 October 2013
- Running time: 151 minutes
- Country: Bangladesh
- Language: Bangla

Premik Number One (also known by the initialism Premik No.1) is a 2013 Bangladeshi romantic drama film. The film was directed by Rakibul Alam Rakib and produced by Anwar Hossain Mintu. It features an ensemble cast, which includes Shakib Khan, Apu Biswas, Nipun Akter, Misha Sawdagor, Bobita, Kazi Hayat, Sabrina Sultana Keya, Sujata, Amaan Reza, Shahnoor, Shahin Alam and Kabila. It is loosely inspired by two Telugu films: Balu (2005) and Ontari (2008).

== Plot ==
The story is of Tibro (Shakib Khan), a boy with a humble beginning who ends up between a rock and a hard place. We see him wooing two ladies while goons are chasing after him.

== Cast ==
- Shakib Khan as Tibro / Rasel
- Apu Biswas as Simi
- Nipun Akter as Tania
- Sabrina Sultana Keya as Keya
- Amaan Reza as Amaan
- Bobita as Momtaz Begum
- Kazi Hayat as Azad
- Sujata as Afia
- Shahin Alam as Shuvro
- Shahnoor as Moon
- Kabila as Abul
- Jesmin
- Misha Sawdagor as Sultan
- Shiba Shanu as Dila
- Don as Don
- Ilias Kobra
- Nasreen as Item number (Special appearance in "Mon Chaile" song)

== Soundtrack ==
Premik Number One

Soundtrack album by Ali Akram Shuvo, Emon Saha
- Released: 2013
- Genre: Feature Film Soundtrack
- Length: 20:36
- Language: Bangla
- Label: G Series
- Producer: Ali Akram Shuvo and Emon Saha

The film soundtrack is composed by Emon Saha and lyrics written by Kabir Bakul. Also a song composed by Ali Akram Shuvo and wrote by Moniruzzaman Monir.

Track listing
No.	Title	Lyrics	Music	Singer(s)	Length
1.	"Ek Dekhate Mone Holo (এক দেখাতে মনে হলো)"	Moniruzzaman Monir	Ali Akram Shuvo	Andrew Kishore, Kanak Chapa	4:23
2.	"Chokher-e Nil Khame (চোখেরই নীল খামে)"	Kabir Bokul	Emon Saha	S I Tutul	4:27
3.	"Hay Ki Rup Mori Mori (হায় কি রূপ মরি মরি)"	Kabir Bakul	Emon Saha	S I Tutul	4:23
4.	"Tumi Hashle Chomke Jai (তুমি হাসলে চমকে যাই)"	Kabir Bakul	Emon Saha	Biplob, Anima D'Costa	3:12
5.	"Mon Chaile (মন চাইলে)"	Kabir Bakul	Emon Saha	Anima D'Costa, Rashed	4:21
Total length:					20:36

== Release ==
The film released in 67 theatres on October 16, 2013 all around the country.
