= Viqarunnisa Noon School and College =

Viqarunnisa Noon School & College
- ভিকারুননিসা নূন স্কুল এন্ড কলেজ

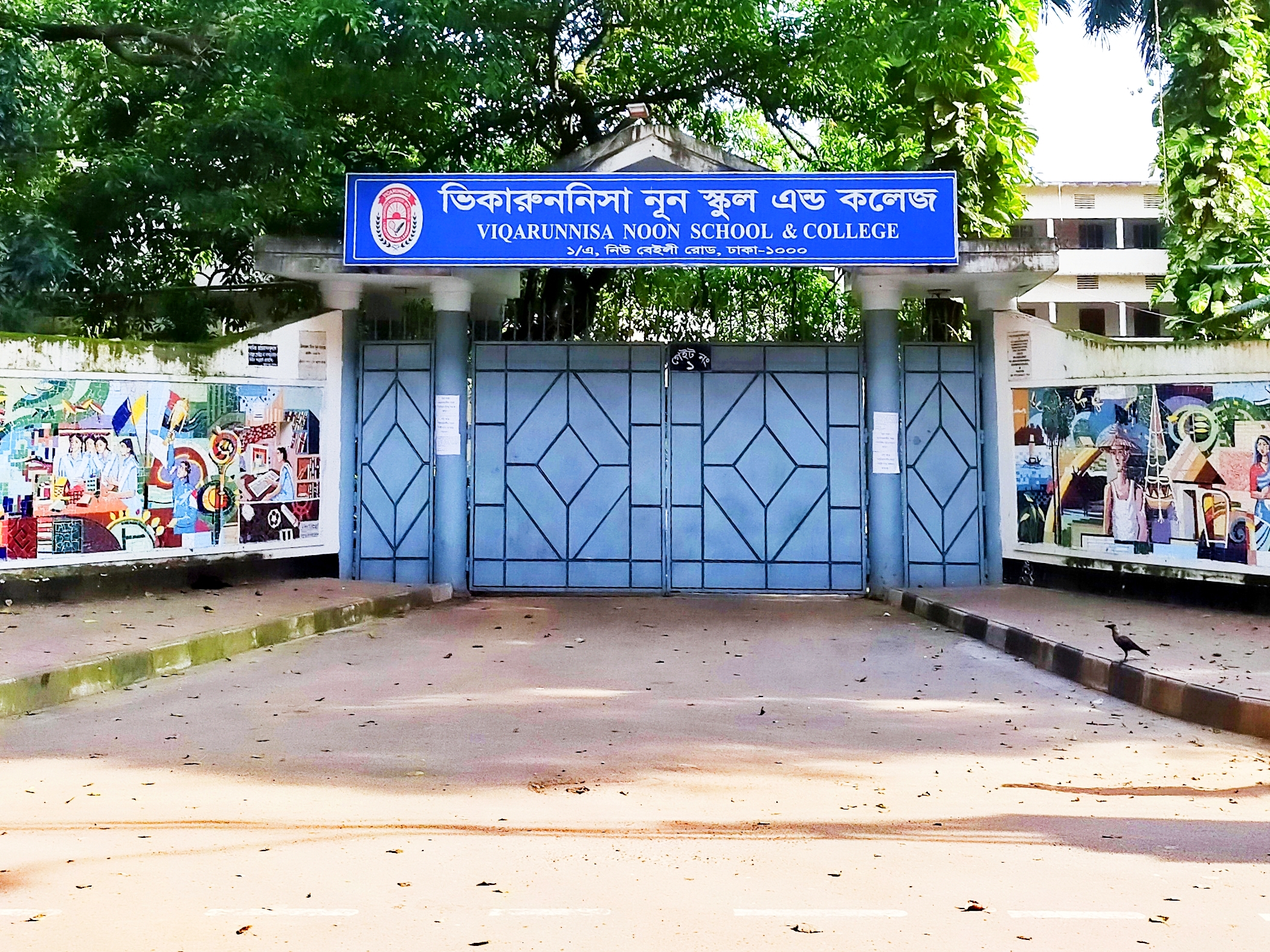
- Main campus of VNSC at Bailey Road

Location
- 1/A, New Bailey Road; Dhaka, 1000; Bangladesh; 23.7425°N 90.4071°E

Information
- Other name: VNSC
- Type: Private
- Motto: Light Through Learning
- Established: 1952
- Chairman: Alamin Chowdhury Esak
- Principal: Mazeda Begum
- Classes: 1–12
- Gender: Female
- Language: Bangla and English
- Campus: Nearly 10 acres, with campuses at Bailey Road Branch; Dhanmondi Branch; Azimpur Branch; Bashundhara Branch
- Colors: White and sky blue
- Accreditation: Board of Intermediate and Secondary Education, Dhaka
- Yearbook: Noon Probaho
- Website: vnsc.edu.bd

Viqarunnisa Noon School & College (Bengali: ভিকারুননিসা নূন স্কুল এন্ড কলেজ), also known as VNSC, is an all-girls secondary school and college in Dhaka, Bangladesh. It has approximately 25,000 students across four campuses in the city. It is named after Viqar un Nisa Noon.

== History ==
The school began as Ramna Preparatory School in 1947. Austrian-Pakistani social worker Begum Viqar un Nisa Noon, wife of the then governor of East Pakistan, Firoz Khan Noon, was impressed when she visited the school in 1950. With her support, the school moved to Bailey Road, where it was renamed in her honour on 14 January 1952.

It soon expanded into a high school and, in 1956, began preparing students for the Senior Cambridge Examination. In 1978, it introduced a college section offering higher secondary courses. In 1986, a day shift was introduced at the main campus.

The school later opened additional branches in Azimpur, Bashundhara, and Dhanmondi.

A team from the school participated in an international handball tournament in Denmark in 1992.

In 1995, the school introduced English-version courses.

== Campuses ==
The main campus on Bailey Road covers approximately six acres of land. With growing admissions, the school introduced multiple sections, afternoon shifts, and three branch campuses in Dhaka at Dhanmondi, Azimpur, and Bashundhara. The Dhanmondi campus address is House No. 6, Road No. 80, Dhanmondi R/A, Dhaka.

== Curriculum ==
The school offers English-version and Bengali-medium courses in three programmes: humanities (Bengali-medium only), science (both English-version and Bengali-medium), and business studies (Bengali-medium only).

== Enrollment and admissions ==
As of 2012, the school had 650 teachers and more than 30,000 students. Only girls are admitted. The school and college sections accept students from all branches of the school as well as from other areas of Bangladesh.

== Rankings and academic performance ==
In 2005, Viqarunnisa Noon School and College ranked second among colleges under the Dhaka Education Board.

In 2007, Viqarunnisa Noon School and College was one of the top three colleges under the Dhaka Education Board.

In 2009, the school was among the top three institutions in Bangladesh in SSC results.

== Administration and governance ==
In March 2010, the Ministry of Education appointed Rokeya Akter as acting principal after she was removed by the board of governors of the school. In June 2010, the government appointed Hosne Ara Begum as principal of Viqarunnisa Noon School.

In April 2019, the Dhaka Education Board halted the recruitment process for a new principal following reports of irregularities.

Justice M Enayetur Rahim and Justice Md Khairul Alam of the Bangladesh High Court halted the appointment of Fouzia Raozan on 16 September 2019 following a petition challenging the government's authority to appoint a principal. The High Court Division later allowed the appointment to proceed, and Chief Justice Hasan Foez Siddique refused to hear a petition challenging her appointment by Advocate Eunus Ali Akond.

Principal Nazneen Ferdous was removed, and Hasina Begum was appointed acting principal.

The Ministry of Education removed Principal Faugia Rezwan over allegations of corruption and made her an Officer on Special Duty in December 2020.

In August 2021, a recording of a conversation between Principal Kamrun Nahar and a guardian was leaked and went viral on social media. Following this, Justice M Enayetur Rahim and Justice Mostafizur Rahman ordered a departmental investigation against the principal.

== Viqarunnisa University ==
=== Establishment and closure ===
Viqarunnisa University (Bengali: ভিকারুননিসা বিশ্ববিদ্যালয়) was a private university in Bangladesh. It was established in 2001. The university is now closed and is no longer conducting any activities.

Former Member of Parliament HBM Iqbal served as chairman of the Viqarunnisa University Foundation. In 2002, the University Grants Commission of Bangladesh (UGC) brought allegations regarding irregularities in the establishment of the institution against the chairman. In 2003, the Supreme Court asked the concerned authorities to reopen the university. The university was named after Austrian-Pakistani social worker Viqar un Nisa Noon.

=== Foundation fund embezzlement case ===
On 10 April 2004, the principal of the school, Royena Hossain, filed a case with the Dhaka District and Sessions Judge's Court against former Member of Parliament and Awami League politician HBM Iqbal, alleging that he embezzled more than 80 million BDT from the foundation's funds. Staff members of Viqarunnisa University were also accused in the case.

== Notable events and incidents ==
=== Crime, safety, and policing ===
In 1989, a parent, Sagira Morshed Salam, was killed by a mugger during an attempted robbery in front of the school.

Two students of the school were kidnapped and later rescued by Bangladesh Police from Asad Gate and Uttara Model Town.

=== Community and external support ===
In April 2008, a forum for guardians of students at the school was established.

In August 2009, the Government of Pakistan, through the High Commission in Dhaka, provided funding for a computer laboratory for the Azimpur branch of the school.

=== Sexual assault case (2011) and aftermath ===
In 2011, a teacher of Viqarunnisa, Porimol Joydhor, sexually assaulted a Class X student and recorded her on his phone. He also threatened to release the recordings online. The victim submitted complaints to school authorities, but no action was taken. This led to widespread criticism and protests.

Students demanded the resignation of Principal Husne Ara Begum. On 13 October 2011, Husne Ara Begum resigned from the post of principal.

The teacher was sentenced to life imprisonment on 25 November 2015.

=== Tuition-fee litigation (2017) ===
In March 2017, Justice Zinat Ara and Justice Kazi Md Ejarul Haque of the High Court Division directed the school not to collect extra tuition fees.

=== Aritry Odhikari suicide (2018) and legal proceedings ===
In December 2018, a ninth-grade student, Aritry Odhikari, died by suicide after being insulted by school authorities.

The incident received nationwide attention and sparked protests.

Education Minister Nurul Islam Nahid described the incident as "painful and tragic".

A probe by the Ministry of Education found various irregularities within the school administration.

Some students protested and demanded the release of one of the detained teachers.

Two teachers were indicted by the court. Arrest warrants were later issued against them.

=== Admissions litigation (2023) ===
On 16 January 2023, the Ministry of Education issued a circular limiting additional admissions beyond the number of seats in a school to seven percent. This prevented the admission of 41 students, whose parents filed a petition with the Bangladesh High Court.

Justice KM Kamrul Kader and Justice Mohammad Ali ordered the school to ignore the ministry circular and admit the 41 students to Grade 1.

In May 2023, Justice KM Kamrul Kader and Justice Mohammad Showkat Ali Chowdhury of the High Court Division ordered the school to admit 18 Grade 1 students whose siblings were already enrolled at the school.

== Notable alumni ==
- Luna Shamsuddoha — banker and entrepreneur
- Shama Obaed — State Minister of Foreign Affairs of Bangladesh.
- Meghna Alam — Miss Earth Bangladesh 2020 title holder.

== Notable faculty ==
- Nurjahan Murshid — veteran of the Bangladesh Liberation War and cabinet minister
- Dilara Zaman — actress

== See also ==
- Adamjee Cantonment College
- Dhaka College
- BAF Shaheen College Dhaka
- Holy Cross College, Dhaka
- Notre Dame College, Dhaka
- St Joseph Higher Secondary School
