= Shammi Islam Nila =

Bangladesh beauty pageant titleholder (born 2002)

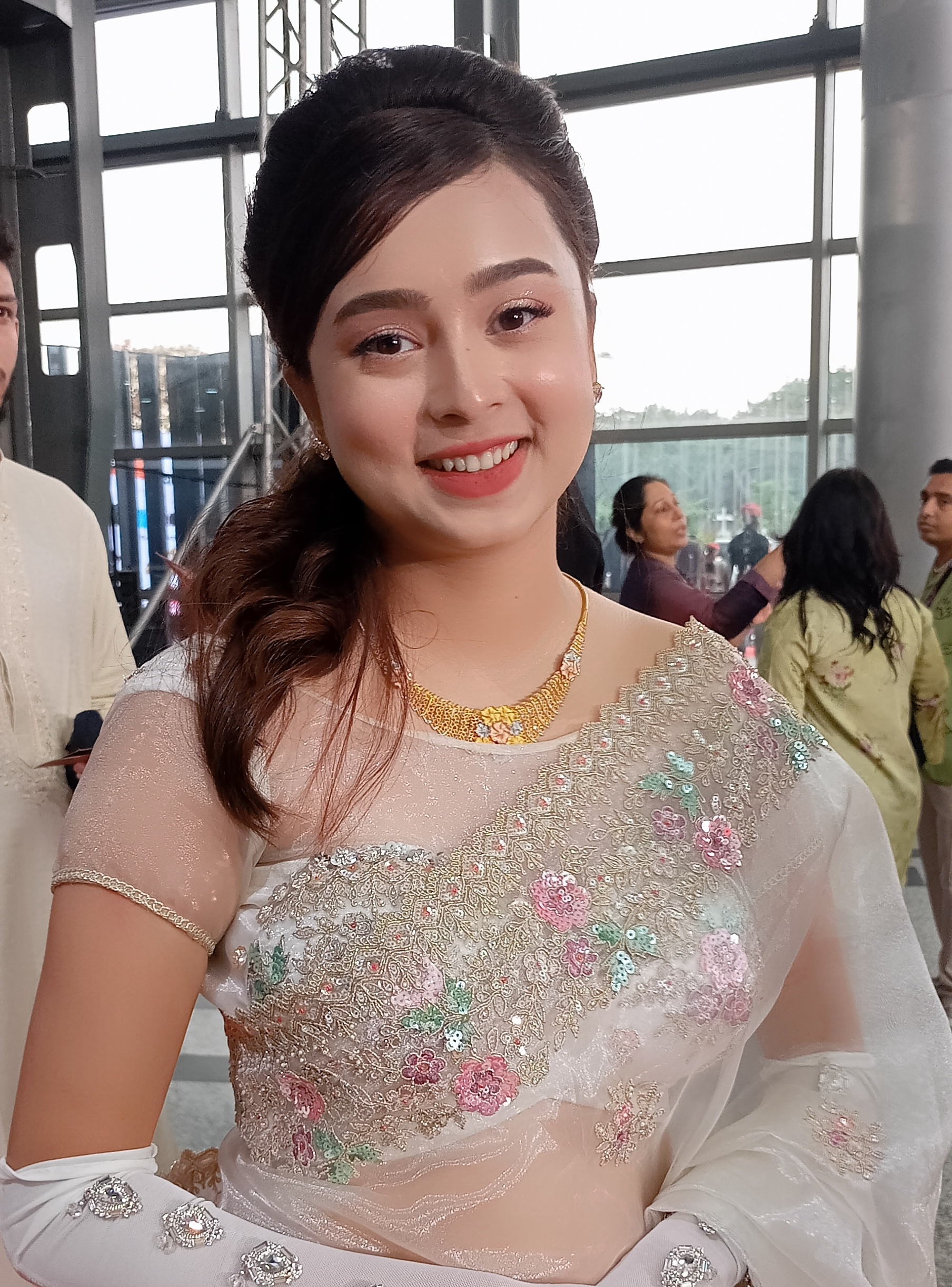
- Born: Shammi Islam Nila; 1999 or 2000 (age 26–27)
- Height: 1.61 m (5 ft 3 in)
- Predecessor: Rafah Nanjeba Torsa
- Spouses: Mohammad Al Adita Noorullah (m. 2025)
- Beauty pageant titleholder
- Title: Miss World Bangladesh 2023
- Major competitions: Miss World Bangladesh 2023; (Winner); Miss World 2024; (Unplaced)

Shammi Islam Nila (born 2000) is a Bangladeshi model and beauty pageant title holder who won Miss World Bangladesh 2023 on 28 January 2024. She represented Bangladesh at Miss World 2024.

== Pageantry ==
Nila won Miss World Bangladesh on 28 January 2024, against nine other contestants.

== Personal life ==
On 10 January 2025, Nila married Mohammad Al Adita Noorullah, a UK expatriate and businessperson. As of January 2025, she is studying Bachelor of Business Administration at North South University.

== Filmography ==
=== Television drama ===
| Year | Title | Role | Notes | Ref. |
|---|---|---|---|---|
| 2024 | Love Sab | Nila | Cameo appearance | |
| 2025 | First Love | Nila | Won – Meril-Prothom Alo Awards for Best Newcomer Actress | |
