= Keya (actress) =

Bangladeshi actress

Sabrina Sultana Keya
- Born: 12 October 1985 (age 40)
- Occupations: Actress, model
- Years active: 2001-Present

Sabrina Sultana Keya, also known by her stage name Keya, (born 12 October 1985), is a Bangladeshi actress and model who acted in films and television dramas and became a model in television commercials (TVCs).

Starting her career in 2001, she became one of the most popular actresses with her performances in lead roles in movies such as Sahoshi Manush Chai, Bhalobashar Shotru, Rongbaz Badshah, Nosto, Black Money, Underworld, Rajdhani Raja, Mastan Shomrat, Deewana Mastana, Tokai Theke Hero, and Yes Madam. Her supporting roles in films such as Chai Komotha, Khuner Porinam, and Premik Number One have also helped her keep her place in Bangladeshi film industry.

== Biography ==
Keya made her debut in Dhallywood at the age of 14 with Kothin Bastob in 2001. She acted in Sahoshi Manush Chai in 2003. This film won National Film Award in two categories. Black Money was her last released film which was released in 2015.

== Selected filmography ==
- Kothin Bastob (2001)
- Abbajan (2001)
- Rangbazz Badsha (2001)
- Bhalobashar Shotru (2002)
- Hridoyer Bandhon (2002)
- Sahoshi Manush Chai (2003)
- Underworld (2003)
- Khuner Porinaam (2003)
- Tokai Theke Hero (2003)
- Tumi Shudhu Amar (2003)
- Chai Khamota (2003)
- Noshto (2004)
- Oporad Domon (2004)
- Deewana Mastana (2004)
- Danger Hero (2004)
- Palta Akromon (2004)
- Mission Shantipur (2005)
- Mohobbot Zindabad (2005)
- Nishiddho Jatra (2006)
- Mastan Samrat (2007)
- Rajdhanir Raja (2008)
- Mone Boro Kosto (2009)
- Tumi Ki Shei (2019)
- Shei Toofan (2010)
- Bondhu Tumi Shotru Tumi (2011)
- Premik Number One (2013)
- Ayna Kahini (2013)
- Atmoghatok (2013)
- Black Money (2015)
- Kotha Dilam (2023)
- Kathgolap (2023)
- Yes Madam (2025)
