= Rashed Mamun Apu =

Bangladeshi actor and director

- রাশেদ মামুন অপু
- Born: July 13, 1979 (age 47); Rajshahi, Bangladesh
- Education: University of Rajshahi

Rashed Mamunur Rahman (born 13 July 1979), popularly known as Rashed Mamun Apu, is a Bangladeshi actor and director. He made his debut through the film Common Gender (2012). He received praise for his role as the main antagonist in the film Nabab LLB (2020).

== Early life ==
Apu was born on 13 July 1979 in Rajshahi, Bangladesh. He studied law from the University of Rajshahi.

== Career ==
Apu started his career as a theatre director. His first play was 'Left Right Left'. He then directed several other plays, including 'Ishwarer Golpo'.

In 2017, he earned much praise for his role as 'Tota Mia' in his debut drama 'City Bus'.

== Television ==
- Pangkha
- City Bus
- City Bus 2

== Filmography ==
Key
†	Denotes films that have not yet been released

Year	Film	Role	Notes	Ref.
2020	Nabab LLB	Newaz Bashar		
2022	Mafia	Shahjahan Pappu "Planner Pappu"		
2023	Kathgolap			
2024	Dead Body			
2024	Shesh Bazi	Ripon		
2025	Jongli	Sujon Shah		
2025	Daagi	Ravi		
2025	Jol Rong	Aynal		
2026	Prince: Once Upon a Time in Dhaka	Fancy Mannan		
2026	Atarbibilane			
