= Shahnour =

Shahnour is an Armenian name. It may refer to:

- Shahan Shahnour, or Chahan Chahnour, pen name of Shahnour Kerestejian (1903–1974), French-Armenian writer and poet
- Shahnur Vaghinak Aznavourian, birth name of Charles Aznavour (1924–2018), French-Armenian singer, lyricist and diplomat ambassador for Armenia

== See also ==
- Shahnoor (disambiguation)
