= Kathgolap =

- Film poster
- Directed by: Sazzad Khan
- Written by: Aporna Rubel
- Produced by: Md. Farman Ali
- Starring: Keya; Dilruba Doyel; Meghla Mukta; Rashed Mamun Apu; AK Azad Setu; Jamshed Shamim
- Production company: Dreamland Entertainment
- Release date: 5 August 2023 (JFF)
- Country: Bangladesh
- Language: Bengali

Kathgolap is a Bangladeshi film directed by Sazzad Khan and produced by Md. Farman Ali for Dreamland Entertainment. The story and screenplay were written by Aporna Rubel.

The film was screened at several international film festivals and received awards. The Bangladeshi film Kathgolap was officially banned from public exhibition in Bangladesh by the Ministry of Information and Broadcasting.

== Premise ==
The narrative follows the interconnected lives and struggles of three women from different social backgrounds—a housewife, a corporate employee, and a schoolteacher. The film explores deep-seated social taboos, human emotional complexities, and unspoken needs within family structures.

== Cast ==
- Sabrina Sultana Keya as a teacher
- Dilruba Doyel
- Meghla Mukta
- Rashed Mamun Apu
- AK Azad Setu
- Jamshed Shamim
- Kuntal Booki
- Shilpi Sarkar Apu
- Sujon Habib

== Production ==
The film's pre production and filming was started on 16 October 2022. Shooting took place across some urban locations in Dhaka, including Panthapath, Uttara, Hatirjheel, Mirpur DOHS, and Shanto-Mariam University of Creative Technology campus.

== Release and Controversy ==
=== Festival Screenings ===
The world premiere of the film held in New Delhi, India, at the 11th Jagran Film Festival (JFF) in 2023. The film Kathgolap was selected for several international film festivals and also screened at the Golden Femina Film Festival in Sofia, Bulgaria in June 2024.

=== Ban in Bangladesh ===
In September 2023, the producer submitted the film to the Bangladesh Film Censor Board for certification. But the appeal was rejected, leading the Ministry of Information and Broadcasting to ban the film officially in October 2025 under Section 12(1) of the Bangladesh Film Certification Act, 2023. The government declared the film is uncertified and they banned all public screenings across Bangladesh.

== Accolades ==
Kathgolap has received international recognition and awards across various foreign film festivals prior to its restriction in Bangladesh.

Event / Festival	Category / Award	Result	Ref.
76th Cannes Film Festival (2023)	Cannes Market (Poster Launch)	Participated	
Jagran Film Festival, India (2023)	Official Selection	Nominated	
Shanta Dev International Film Festival, Chennai	Best Debut Feature Film	Won	
Navy International Film Festival, Malaysia	Festival Award	Won	
The Golden Femi Film Festival, Bulgaria (2024)	Feature Film Award / Selection	Won	
