= Miss Earth Bangladesh =

National beauty pageant

- Formation: 2020
- Type: Beauty pageant
- Headquarters: Dhaka
- Location: Bangladesh
- Members: Miss Earth
- Official language: Bengla; English
- National Director: Moli Akter Sadia
- Parent organisation: Triple Nine Global (2020-2021); Real Heroes Expo & Communications (2023); Miss Bangladesh Organization (2024-2025); Miss and Mrs. Elegance Bangladesh (2026-Present)
- Website: event.missandmrselegancebd.com

Miss Earth Bangladesh is a title given to the Bangladeshi woman who represents Bangladesh at Miss Earth pageant, an annual international major beauty pageant that advocates for environmental awareness, conservation, and social responsibility. The current national pageant which chooses the Bangladeshi representative for Miss Earth is Miss and Mrs. Elegance Bangladesh.

Miss Earth Bangladesh 2026 is Nowrin Nawyar Aritry also known as Aritry Abdullah who was crowned by outgoing titleholder Somaya Harun.

== History ==
Miss Earth Bangladesh launched officially on 28 January 2020. Meghna Alam became the first winner of this competition in 2020.

== Titleholders ==
- : Declared as Winner
- : Ended as runner-up or top 5/6 qualification
- : Ended as one of the finalists or semifinalists
- : Ended as special awards winner

Year	District	Miss Earth Bangladesh	Placement at Miss Earth	Special Awards
2026	Dhaka	Aritry Abdullah	Withdraw	
2025	Dhaka	Somaya Harun	Unplaced	
2024	Barishal	Ferdousi Tanvir Ichchha	Unplaced	
2023	Naogaon	Anika Bushra Mariya	Unplaced	
2022	Did not compete			
2021	Dhaka	Umme Zamilatun Naima	Unplaced	(silver) Talent Competition (Singing)
2020	Dhaka	Meghna Alam	Unplaced	(bronze) Talent Competition (Sing) (Asia) Netizen's Choice - Talent Competition (Sing)

== See also ==
- Miss Bangladesh
- Miss Universe Bangladesh
- Miss World Bangladesh
- Miss Grand Bangladesh
