= Giorgia Palmas =

Italian television personality and model (born 1982)

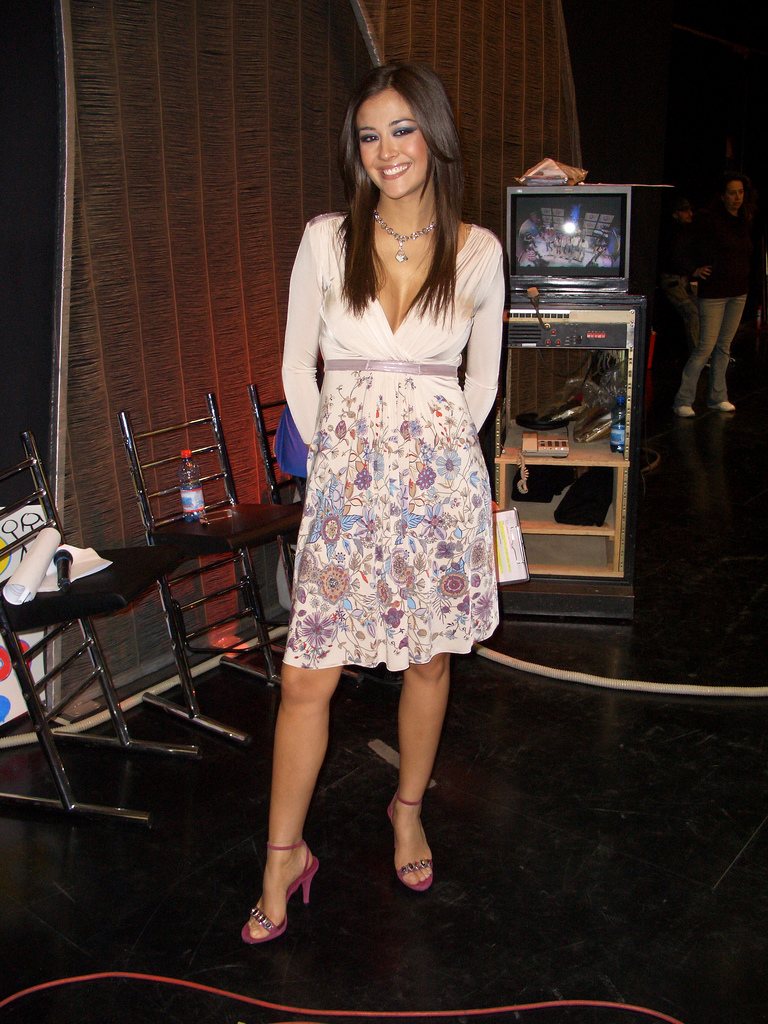
- Palmas in 2007.
- Born: Giorgia Palmas; 5 March 1982 (age 44); Cagliari, Italy
- Occupations: Television personality; model; actress
- Height: 5 ft 7 in (1.70 m)
- Children: 2

Giorgia Palmas (born 5 March 1982) is an Italian television personality, actress and model. She became famous following her appearances on the Italian television show Striscia la notizia.

== Biography ==
Palmas was born in Cagliari. She began her career in the year 2000, coming second (first runner-up) in Miss World, losing to Miss India, Priyanka Chopra. She earned Italy's highest placement (as of now) in Miss World. In 2001, she was in Buona Domenica, as a microfonina. In 2002, she won the television show Veline, becoming the brunette velina, in pair with Elena Barolo, the new blonde velina. For two television seasons, 2002/2003 and 2003/2004, she was a velina in Striscia la notizia, gaining her a lot of popularity. After leaving Striscia la notizia she appeared in Italia 1 summer edition of Lucignolo, with Elena Barolo. In September of the same year she was in Rai 1 show, I Raccomandati. She was chosen to be testimonial of "Cotton Club" brand underwear. In February 2005, she appeared on the cover of Max Magazine but had per top on, it was just a sexy picture. Due to popular demand, Giorgia Palmas posed fully topless for Max Magazine 2006 calendar. This is the first time Giorgia posed fully topless with her breasts and nipples completely exposed. The calendar hit sales records and was a massive hit among all men.

In June 2005 she was in CD Live Estate on RAI 2. She has been confirmed also for the next season. She is the winner of the reality show L'isola dei famosi. She won the reality show in front of 4,842,000 viewers in Italian with 21.90% share with an audience of the final 46%. L'isola dei famosi shows to beat the strong competition of RAI and Mediaset

Since 17 June 2013 back to Sprint Paperissima lead throughout the summer, next to Vittorio Brumotti and Gabibbo.

=== Private life ===
From 2004 to 2011, she was engaged to footballer Davide Bombardini.

== Filmography ==
=== As an actress ===
Year	Title	Role	Notes
2001	Compagni di scuola	Federica	Main role; 20 episodes
2005	Do You Like Hitchcock?	Girl	Television film
2005	Carabinieri	Roberta Tosi	Recurring role (season 5); 4 episodes
2008	Camera Café	Giorgia	Episode: "L'amica del cuore"
2008	Buona la prima!	Herself	Episode: "Tatuaggio selvaggio"
2009	Così fan tutte	Various	Episode: "Episodio 5"
2011	Vacanze di Natale a Cortina	Herself	Cameo appearance

=== As herself ===
Year	Title	Role	Notes
2000	Bellissima	Contestant	Talent show (season 5)
2000	Miss World 2000	Contestant	Annual beauty contest
2001	125 milioni di caz…te	Co-host	Variety show
2001–2002	Buona Domenica	Co-host	Variety show (season 14)
2002	Veline	Contestant – Winner	Talent show (season 1)
2002–2004	Striscia la notizia	Co-host	Variety show (seasons 14–16)
2005	Ma chi sei Mandrake?	Contestant	Game show
2005	il Calendario di Max con Giorgia Palmas	Model	Topless modeling
2007	TRL On Tour	Co-host	Musical program (season 2)
2011	L'Isola dei Famosi	Contestant – Winner	Reality show (season 8)
2011–2014	Paperissima Sprint	Co-host	Comedy program (seasons 13, 15, 17)
2012	X Factor on Ice	Host	Talent show
2015	Festival Show 2015	Host	Annual music festival
2017–2018	Il processo di Biscardi	Host	Talk show (season 24)
2018	Fan Car-aoke	Co-host	Variety show (season 2)
2021	Ultima gara	Herself	Documentary film

Awards and achievements
Preceded by (Israel) Jenny Chervoney	Miss World Europe; 2000	Succeeded by (Scotland) Juliet-Jane Horne
Preceded by (Venezuela) Martina Thorogood	Miss World (1st Runner-Up); 2000	Succeeded by (Aruba) Zizi Lee
