= Anupama Mukti =

Bangladeshi playback singer

Anupama Mukti is a Bangladeshi playback singer. She is most remembered for her superb rendition in 2005 film Hajar Bochor Dhore. She earned prestigious Bachsas Awards and nominated for National Film Awards.

== Early life ==
Anupama is a graduate from Home Economics College, Dhaka. She started singing when she was just four. he completed a certificate course in Nazrul Sangeet from BAFA and began special training at the Nazrul Institute in the proper notation of Nazrul songs. She was trained in classical by Sharif Ahmed Rajkumar, later she learnt from Mangal Chandra Mandal and Sujit Mustafa.

== Career ==
Anupama started her career in 2003 with the film 'Andhokare Chita'. She sang a duet with Palash, composed by Shawkat Ali Emon. After that, she was given a chance by veteran actress Suchanda for her directorial debut Hajar Bochor Dhore, a duet song "Tumi Shutoy Bedhecho" with veteran singer Subir Nandi and composed by veteran composer Ahmed Imtiaz Bulbul. The song became a hit. She was awarded Bachsas Award for Best Female Playback Singer as well as nominated for National Awards, ultimately losing it to Sabina Yasmin. She has published three mixed albums : Maa, Pasha, Sundari. Jhinuker Mukto is her only solo album. In 2013, she performed live on popular channel RTV's "Banglalion music fest". She sang popular songs rendered by her in the fest.

== Discography ==
Mixed

- Maa
- Pasha
- Sundari

Solo

- Jhinuker Mukto

== Filmography ==
- Andhokare Chita (2003)
- Hajar Bochor Dhore (2005)
