= Ontari (film) =

- Theatrical release poster
- Directed by: B.V. Ramana
- Written by: Marudhuri Raja; Bhasha Sri (dialogues)
- Screenplay by: B.V. Ramana
- Story by: Ee Taram Films Unit
- Produced by: Pokuri Babu Rao
- Starring: Gopichand; Bhavana; Ashish Vidyarthi; Ajay; Sayaji Shinde; Paruchuri Venkateswara Rao
- Cinematography: Sarvesh Murari
- Edited by: Gautham Raju
- Music by: Mani Sharma
- Production company: Ee Taram Films
- Release date: 14 February 2008
- Running time: 142 minutes
- Country: India
- Language: Telugu

Ontari (transl. Loner) is a 2008 Indian Telugu-language psychological thriller film produced by Pokuri Babu Rao under the Ee Taram Films banner and directed by B.V. Ramana. The film stars Gopichand and Bhavana, with music composed by Mani Sharma. It was released theatrically on 14 February 2008. The film is a loose adaptation of the 2004 British film Dead Man's Shoes.

Ontari received mixed reviews from critics, with praise for Gopichand’s performance, humour, and editing, while criticism was directed at the weak screenplay and Ramana's direction.

The film was later remade twice in Bangladesh as Boss Number One (2011) and Premik Number One (2013), both starring Shakib Khan.

== Plot ==
This movie starts in a dhaba where a kid is giving tea to a customer when suddenly a car crashes into the dhaba. A gangster named Veeraju (Supreet) tries to escape with injuries and runs into a guest house and closes the door and tries to make a call suddenly when bell rang Veeraju tries see in eye hole out side person Vamsi (Gopichand) shoots him brutally and breaks the door enters inside shoots more times while leaving security sees Vamsi but leaves because of his anger is the son of an affluent handloom house owner, Muddu Krishna Rao (Paruchuri Venkateswara Rao). He falls in love with Bujji (Bhavana), an orphan who resides in a hostel. With his parents' consent, Vamsi plans to get engaged to Bujji. However, before the engagement, a group of gangsters kidnaps her.

Bujji is nearly assaulted by Lal Mahankali's (Ashish Vidyarthi) younger brother, Panda (Ajay), but Vamsi intervenes and beats him up. Enraged, Mahankali vows revenge and executes his plan on the day of Vamsi and Bujji's wedding. With the support of MLA Raghava (Rajiv Kanakala), a close friend of Vamsi, Mahankali kidnaps Bujji and brutally raped her in front of Vamsi. Raghava, in exchange for political gain, betrays Vamsi and helps Mahankali. During the confrontation, Mahankali stabs Vamsi, leaving him severely wounded.

Vamsi, determined to take revenge, arrives in Hyderabad and begins hunting down the gangsters responsible. After discovering Raghava’s betrayal, he kills him. Meanwhile, ACP (Sayaji Shinde) investigates the case and interrogates Vamsi’s family. Vamsi, suffering from hallucinations, remains unaware of key details until the ACP reveals them to him. Despite initially pursuing Vamsi, the ACP ultimately sympathizes with him and allows him to continue his quest for vengeance.

In the climax, Vamsi finally tracks down Mahankali, kills him, and severs Panda’s arm. However, his vengeance is overshadowed by a devastating truth—his father, Krishna Rao, reveals that Bujji had died on the day of their engagement. Unable to endure the trauma, she had jumped from a building, ending her life.

== Cast ==
- Gopichand as Vamsi
- Bhavana as Kanaka Mahalakshmi "Bujji"
- Ashish Vidyarthi as Lal Mahankali
- Ajay as Panda, Lal Mahankali's younger brother
- Sayaji Shinde as ACP
- Paruchuri Venkateswara Rao as Muddu Krishnayya, Vamsi’s father
- Chandra Mohan as Siva Prasad, Kanaka's father
- Sumitra as Amrutham, Vamsi's mother
- Sudha as Janaki, Kanaka's mother
- Supreeth as Veeraju
- Brahmanandam as Ramakrishna
- Sunil as Subbu
- Brahmaji as Bantu Rao
- Ali as ATM
- Naresh as Vamsi's elder brother
- Rajiv Kanakala as Raghava
- Narra Venkateswara Rao as Minister
- Raghu Babu as Lal Mahankali's henchman
- Indu Anand as Vamsi's mother
- Chitti as Vamsi's second brother
- Rajitha as Vamsi's elder sister-in-law
- Bharath Raju as Lal Mahankali's henchman
- Sujatha Reddy as Vamsi's second sister-in-law
- Prasanna Kumar as S.I.
- Revathi
- Baby Nishptha
- Madhavi as Vamsi's youngest sister-in-law
- Bill Bitra

== Music ==
Ontari

Film score by Mani Sharma
- Released: 3 February 2008
- Recorded: 2008
- Genre: Soundtrack
- Length: 25:27
- Label: Aditya Music
- Producer: Mani Sharma

Mani Sharma chronology
Pourudu (2008)	Ontari (2008)	Kantri (2008)

Music was composed by Mani Sharma and was released through Aditya Music.

Track-List
No.	Title	Lyrics	Singer(s)	Length
1.	"Arerey Yemaindhi"	Ramajogayya Sastry	Hemachandra, Malavika	4:54
2.	"Chepalani Vundi"	Ramajogayya Sastry	SP Charan, Kalpana	4:51
3.	"Warre Warre"	Bashasri	Naveen	4:51
4.	"Nee Jimmada"	Bhaskarabhatla Ravi Kumar	Rahul Nambiar, Anitha Karthikeyan	4:44
5.	"O Maare O Maare"	Ramajogayya Sastry	Ranjith, Anuradha Sriram	4:42
6.	"Lakshmi Ksheera Samudra"	Slokam	Usha	1:19
Total length:				25:27

== Remakes ==
The film was remade twice in Dhallywood as Boss Number One (2011) and Premik Number One (2013) with Shakib Khan.
