= Bir Soinik =

Bangladeshi film

- Poster
- Directed by: Delwar Jahan Jhantu
- Written by: Delwar Jahan Jhantu
- Produced by: Borsha; Delwar Jahan Jhantu; Shahidul Haq Shikdar
- Starring: Manna; Moushumi; Yasmin Bilkis Sathi; Rosy Samad; Humayun Faridi; Asif Iqbal; Nasir Khan; Siraj Haider; Gangua; Dildar
- Cinematography: Hannan Serniyabad
- Edited by: Dildar Hasan
- Music by: Anwar Jahan Nantu
- Release date: 2003
- Country: Bangladesh
- Language: Bengali

Bir Soinik (Bengali: বীর সৈনিক) is a Bangladeshi Bengali-language film. The film was released in 2003 in Bangladesh. It was directed and written by Delwar Jahan Jhantu. It stars Manna, Moushumi, Rosy Samad, Humayun Faridi, Yasmin Bilkis Sathi and many more. The movie is a remake of the Tamil language film Sardar Papa Rayudu (1980) and the Hindi language film Gadar: Ek Prem Katha (2001).

Bir Soinik received special recognition as Manna and Yasmin Bilkis Sathi won the National Film Awards of Bangladesh for Best Actor and Best Actress in a Supporting Role in 2003.

== Plot ==
On the eve of the Liberation War, Mohammad Ali was a soldier in the East Pakistani army. He fell in love with his superior's daughter, Mehnaz, and married her. However, Mehnaz's father, Ramjan Ali, murdered Mohammad Ali's mother and sister. When the war broke out, Sharafat Khan took his daughter to Pakistan. After the war, Mohammad Ali travelled to Pakistan to find his wife. He returned with his son, Abdullah, only to discover that Mehnaz had been killed by Ramjan Ali. Can Mohammad Ali find Ramjan Ali and get his revenge?

== Cast ==
- Manna as Mohammad Ali / Abdullah
- Moushumi as Rubi
- Yasmin Bilkis Sathi as Mehnaz
- Rosy Samad as Mohammad Ali's Mother (as Rosy Afsari)
- Humayun Faridi as Ramjan Molla
- Asif Iqbal as Akash
- Nasir Khan as Sharafat Khan
- Siraj Haider as Shiraj Miah
- Gangua as Bhai
- Dildar
- Sani Alamgir as Sani Miah
- Himu as Himu
- Bobi as Meghla
- Shahin as Shahin Miah

== Music ==
Bir Soinik film music composed by Anwar Jahan Nantu.

=== Soundtrack ===
Tracks	Titles	Singers	Notes
1	Banglar Bodhu	Polash	
2	Banglar Bodhu	Baby Naznin	

== Award and achievements ==
National Film Awards

- Winner Best Actor, Manna
- Winner Best Actress in a Supporting role, Saathi
