= Aha! (film) =

Bangladeshi film

- DVD cover
- Directed by: Enamul Karim Nirjhar
- Written by: Enamul Karim Nirjhar
- Produced by: Faridur Reza Sagar
- Starring: Humayun Faridi; Tarik Anam Khan; Fazlur Rahman Babu; Shahidul Islam Shachhu; Yasmin Bilkis Sathi; Ferdaus (Guest); Pragja Laboni; Khaled Khan; Gazi Rakayet
- Cinematography: Saiful Islam Badal
- Edited by: Arghakamal Mitra
- Music by: Debojyoti Misra
- Distributed by: Impress Telefilm
- Release date: June 2007 (Munich Film Festival)
- Country: Bangladesh
- Language: Bengali

Aha! (Bengali: আহা!) is a 2007 Bangladeshi film, directed and written by Enamul Karim Nirjhar, produced by Faridur Reza Sagar, Impress Telefilm. It was the first film by Enamul Karim Nirjhar and he won the National Film Award 2007 as Best Director and three other categories for best cinematography, best editing and best song Lukochuri Lukochuri Golpo by Fahmida Nabi. He worked with Impress Telefilm for first time.

== Plot ==
Mr. Mallik lives in a house about a hundred years old, at the old part of Dhaka city. Real estate companies frequent around his house at Old Dhaka as they construct multiple apartments. Mr. Malik is also provided with an offer, to have his house demolished and the companies would construct an apartment in its place. This brings Mr. Malik to a point of dilemma. Meanwhile, her daughter, Ruba returns from the United States with her six-year-old son, after being abused by her husband. Hearing about the offer of demolishing their house from her father, she opposes it.

Ruba reminisces her memories around the house as she moves from one room to another. On a balcony, she comes across a man's red underwear owned by their next-door neighbor, Kislu, who wears a different color of underwear each day of the week. Ruba is amused by this and eventually bonds with Kislu.

Soleman, who murdered someone earlier in his life, now works as a security guard at Mr. Mallik's house. He often has fights with the local goons. When Mr. Malik discovers about the relationship between Ruba and Kislu, he plans to separate them and rescue his daughter. When Kislu is murdered, the plot becomes more complicated.

== Starring ==
- Humayun Faridi as Kishlu
- Tariq Anam Khan as Mr. Mallik
- Fazlur Rahman Babu as Soleman
- Shahidul Alam Sachchu as Rafik
- Yasmin Bilkis Sathi as Ruba
- Ferdous as Asif (guest appearance)
- Pragya Labonii as Mina Khala
- Khaled Khan as Khadem, Kishlu's friend
- Gazi Rakayet as Kanchan Bhai

== Awards ==
Aha! won National Film Award 2007 in six categories:

- Best Director: Enamul Karim Nirjhar
- Best Female Singer: Fahmida Nabi
- Best Cinematography: Saiful Islam Badal
- Best Editing: Arghakamal Mitra
- Best Film: Impress Telefilm
- Best Story: Enamul Karim Nirjhar

Aha! was viewed in many international film festivals in Cairo, Dubai, Munich. It also got the National Nomination from Bangladesh for the 81st Academy Awards in the foreign language film category.
