= Rehnuma Dilruba Chitra =

Bangladeshi model

- Beauty pageant titleholder
- Title: Miss Bangladesh 1996
- Major competitions: Miss Bangladesh 1996 (Winner); Miss World 1996 (Unplaced)

Rehnuma Dilruba Chitra is a Bangladeshi model and beauty pageant titleholder who was crowned Miss Bangladesh 1996 and represented Bangladesh at Miss World 1996.

Awards and achievements
Preceded by Yasmin Bilkis Sathi	Miss Bangladesh; 1996	Succeeded by Tania Rahman Tonni
