= Yasmin Bilkis Sathi =

Bangladeshi model

- Beauty pageant titleholder
- Title: Miss Bangladesh 1995
- Major competitions: Miss Bangladesh 1995 (Winner); Miss World 1995 (Unplaced)

Yasmin Bilkis Sathi is a Bangladeshi model, beauty pageant titleholder and actress who was crowned Miss Bangladesh 1995 and represented Bangladesh at Miss World 1995. She also received Bangladesh National Film Award for Best Supporting Actress in 2003 for Bir Soinik.

== Biography ==
After crowning Miss Bangladesh in 1995 Yasmin Bilkis Sathi acted in Pordeshi Babu which was released in 1999. She acted in Bir Soinik in 2003 and for this film she received National Film Award. She also acted in Aha! in 2008.

== Selected filmography ==
- Pordeshi Babu
- Abbajan
- Bir Soinik
- Onyayer Protishodh
- Boro Malik
- Aha!

== Awards and nominations ==
Year	Award	Category	Work	Result
2003	National Film Award	Best Supporting Actress	Bir Soinik	Won

Awards and achievements
Preceded by Anika Taher	Miss Bangladesh; 1995	Succeeded by Rehnuma Dilruba Chitra
