= Shaila Simi =

Bangladeshi model

- Beauty pageant titleholder
- Title: Miss Bangladesh ১)1998
- Major competitions: Miss Bangladesh 1998 (winner); Miss World 1998 (didn't participant)

Shaila Simi is a Bangladeshi model and beauty pageant titleholder. She won the Miss Bangladesh 1998 title but didn't participate in the Miss World 1998 pageant.

Awards and achievements
Preceded by Tania Rahman Tonni	Miss Bangladesh; 1999	Succeeded by Sonia Gazi
