= Tabassum Ferdous Shaon =

Bangladeshi model

- Born: June 17, 1979 (age 47); Dhaka, Bangladesh
- Height: 5 ft 10 in (1.78 m)
- Beauty pageant titleholder
- Title: Miss Bangladesh 2001
- Hair color: Black
- Eye color: Black

Tabassum Ferdous Shaon (born c. 1979) is a Bangladeshi model and beauty pageant titleholder who was crowned Miss Bangladesh 2001. She represented Bangladesh at the 51st Miss World beauty pageant held in Sun City, South Africa on 16 November 2001. Shaon was selected by local tabloid Manab Zamin and London Link Promotion as Miss Bangladesh.

Awards and achievements
Preceded by Sonia Gazi	Miss Bangladesh; 2001	Succeeded by Jannatul Ferdoush Peya
