= Rafah Nanjeba Torsa =

Bangladeshi actress and beauty pageant titleholder

- Born: 9 September 1998 (age 28); Chittagong, Bangladesh
- Beauty pageant titleholder
- Title: Miss World Bangladesh 2019; World Miss University Bangladesh 2022
- Major competitions: Miss World Bangladesh 2019 (Winner); Miss World 2019 (Unplaced); World Miss University 2022 (Unplaced)

Rafah Nanjeba Torsa (born 9 September 1998) is a Bangladeshi actress, TV host and beauty pageant titleholder who was crowned Miss World Bangladesh 2019. She represented Bangladesh at Miss World 2019.

== Biography ==
Torsa's father, Sheikh Morshed, was a lawyer and her mother, Sharmina Akter, is a housewife. Her father died in 2014. She has a younger brother.

Torsa is an artist; a trained bharatanatyam and kathak dancer; a theatre artist, mime artist, reciter, and singer. From the age of 11, she's been working as a volunteer in the Lions Clubs International as a "LEO." She received the first prize in folk dancing in the Bangabandhu Shishu Kishor Competition 2009 from Bangladeshi Prime Minister Sheikh Hasina. She also won a government grant to visit Japan, but could not attend as she was representing Bangladesh in a miming competition in Delhi.

Torsa won a gold medal for bharatanatyam in the National Youth Competition 2010. She was the first runner up of NTV's Marks All Rounder Competition in 2010. She won the first prize in Chittagong divisional competition of the National Science Competition 2015. She also acted in a 2017 Bangladeshi film, Haldaa, which was directed by Tauquir Ahmed. She is a third year graduate student of the International Relations Department of University of Chittagong. Rafah Nanjeba Torsa is also the founder of a non-profit organization named "The Smile Foundation" which started its journey in 2019.

== Pageantry ==
=== Miss World Bangladesh 2019 ===
Torsa was crowned as Miss World Bangladesh 2019 on 11 October 2019. She was crowned by the outgoing titleholder Jannatul Ferdous Oishee, Miss World Bangladesh 2018.

=== Miss World 2019 ===
Torsa represented Bangladesh at Miss World 2019 in London, United Kingdom. She was able to win the first head to head challenge against four countries

=== World Miss University 2022 ===
Torsa represented Bangladesh at World Miss University 2022 in Seoul, South Korea.

== Works ==
=== Feature films ===
Key
†	Denotes films that have not yet been released

Year	Title	Role	Notes	Ref.
2026	Cut-Piece	Mala	Debut film	
2026	Nirjon Sakkhor †	TBA	Filming	

=== TV series ===
Year	Title	Role	Notes	Ref.
2021–2022	Friendbook	Purna	TV series on NTV	

Awards and achievements
Preceded by Jannatul Ferdous Oishee	Miss World Bangladesh; 2019	Succeeded by
