= Marjana Chowdhury =

Bangladesh beauty pageant titleholder

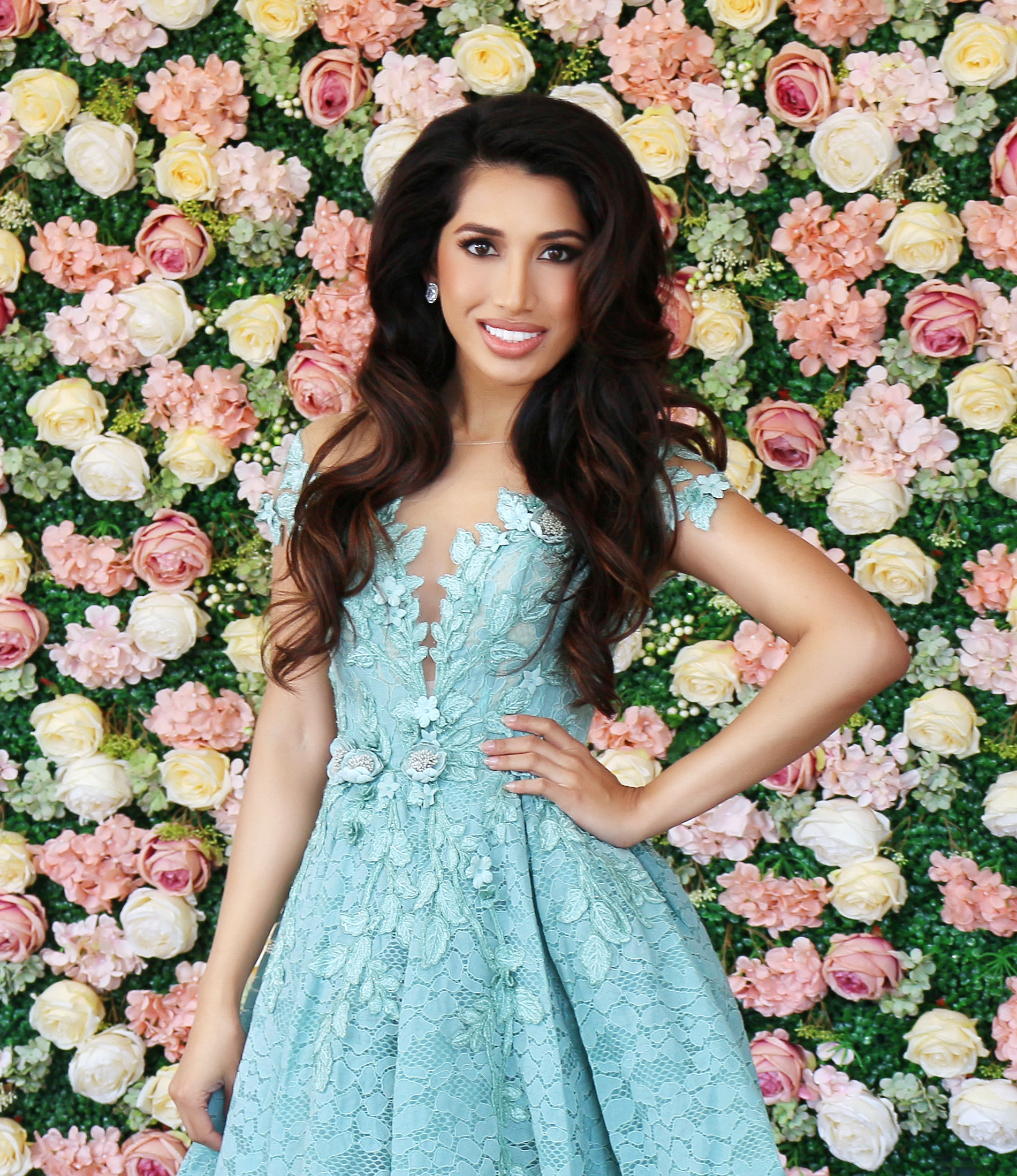
- Chowdhury in 2016
- Born: Sylhet, Bangladesh
- Education: Columbia College, Columbia University
- Beauty pageant titleholder
- Title: Miss Alaska World 2019; Miss Asia Pacific Bangladesh 2018; Miss Grand Bangladesh 2021
- Major competitions: Miss Bangladesh US 2016 (Winner); Miss World America 2017 (Top 16); (2nd Runner Up of Beauty with a Purpose); Miss Asia Pacific International 2018 (Top 20); Miss Alaska World 2019 (Winner); Miss World America 2019 (Top 25); Miss Grand International 2021 (Unplaced)

Marjana Chowdhury (Bengali: মারজানা চৌধুরী) is a Bangladeshi beauty pageant titleholder. She was crowned Miss Grand Bangladesh 2021 and represented Bangladesh at Miss Grand International. She also won Miss Alaska World 2019, competed in Miss World America 2019, and reached the top 25, won Miss Bangladesh 2017, and represented Bangladesh at Miss Asia Pacific International 2018. She previously won the 2016 Miss Bangladesh USA competition.

== Pageants ==
=== Miss Bangladesh US 2016 ===
In August 2016, Chowdhury won Miss Bangladesh US. She was selected to represent Bangladesh at Miss Asia Pacific International in the Philippines that year but was unable to participate due to modesty concerns.

=== America's Miss World 2017 ===
In August 2017, Chowdhury participated in America's Miss World 2017, and reached the top 16. She reached the a top five in the Beauty with a Purpose competition for her work with the Young Women's Leadership Network.

=== Miss Bangladesh 2017 ===
In August 2017, Chowdhury won Miss Bangladesh 2017.

=== Miss Asia Pacific International 2018 ===
In October 2018, Chowdhury represented Bangladesh at Miss Asia Pacific International 2018 and reached the top 20.

=== Miss Alaska World 2019 ===
In 2019, Chowdhury won Miss Alaska World 2019.

=== Miss World America 2019 ===
In October 2019, Chowdhury represented Alaska at Miss World America 2019 in Las Vegas, Nevada and reached the top 25.

== Education and other achievements ==
Chowdhury attended the Young Women's Leadership School of East Harlem, New York from 2005 to 2011 and graduated as valedictorian of her class. In 2011, she received first prize at the New York City Science and Engineering Fair and represented New York as a finalist for the Intel International Science and Engineering Fair with Maryama Diaw.

The pair's winning project assessed the reproductive success of the Eastern mosquitofish, used as a surrogate to the Okaloosa darter. Results from this inquiry were important to the reintroduction of the formerly endangered species, the Okaloosa darter, into suitable stream systems to ensure population success. Chowdhury and Diaw's efforts in collaboration with the United States Fish and Wildlife Service, the Biology Department of Loyola University New Orleans, the Florida Fish and Wildlife Conservation Commission, and other students from the Young Women's Leadership School of East Harlem helped to reclassify the Etheostoma okaloosae from the status of endangered to threatened under the Endangered Species Act of 1973.

Chowdhury earned her Bachelor of Arts degree from Columbia College, Columbia University, in 2015. In 2013, she participated with a team consisting of other Columbia University and Cooper Union members in the International Genetic Engineering and Machines Competition. Her team took home a bronze prize for their project on a synthetic biology approach to etch copper in order to redefine the manufacturing of printed circuit boards.

Chowdhury was also a Gates Millennium Scholar and an Albert Shanker Scholar. In her final year at Columbia University, she received a King's Crown Leadership Award.

== Philanthropy ==
Chowdhury is a member of the Student Leadership Network (SLN) and its CollegeBound Initiative (CBI). She graduated as a SLN and CBI alum in 2011 and has been volunteering with the organization since then as a mentor to underprivileged middle and high-school students undergoing the college admissions process. She is also a member of the organization's junior board, Next Gen. In 2019, Chowdhury was an honoree at the Collegebound Initiative Gala for her work with the organization.

Chowdhury is also a member of the Robin Hood Foundation's young professionals' network, PYT. She serves as a liaison for the program at the asset management firm where she works, assisting in the organization and coordination of different charity projects volunteering with many of New York's notable philanthropic organizations with members of her firm.

In 2016, Chowdhury served as an assistant facilitator with Rikers Story Bot, one of several programs offered by the Rikers Education Project, a collaboration of the Center for Justice at Columbia University and the Heyman Center for the Humanities at Columbia University. The program allowed teenage inmates at Rikers Island to work alongside Columbia University members and students to learn the basics of the programming language Python, to tweet about their personal experiences, and to contribute code to Rikers Story Bot.
