= Sonia Gazi =

- Beauty pageant titleholder
- Title: Miss Bangladesh 2000
- Major competitions: Miss Bangladesh 2000 (Winner); Miss World 2000 (Unplaced)

Sonia Gazi is a Bangladeshi model and beauty pageant titleholder who was crowned Miss Bangladesh 2000 and represented Bangladesh at Miss World 2000.

Awards and achievements
Preceded by Shaila Simi	Miss Bangladesh; 2000	Succeeded by Tabassum Ferdous Shaon
