= Miss Grand Bangladesh =

Bangladeshi beauty pageant title

- Formation: 2021
- Type: Beauty pageant
- Headquarters: Dhaka
- Location: Bangladesh
- Members: Miss Grand International
- Official language: Bengali; English
- National director: Mustafa Islam Duke
- Parent organization: Miss Bangladesh US Organization (2021–2022); Glamanand Group (2024); Flora Bank Limited (2026-Present)

Miss Grand Bangladesh is a national beauty pageant title that awarded to Bangladeshi representatives elected to compete at the Miss Grand International pageant.

Reigning Miss Grand Bangladesh is Anonna Fatima who was crowned by outgoing titleholder Jessia Islam.

== History ==
Initially, Bangladesh was expected to make its debut at the Miss Grand International pageant in 2013, 2014, and 2015, but all of the respective year's representatives did not enter the contest for undisclosed reasons.The title was first awarded in 2013, when Dhaka-based model Farhana Azad Limi was invited to compete in the inaugural edition of Miss Grand International held in Thailand; however, Limi did not participate in the competition for unknown reasons. Fatimatu Zohra Itisha was appointed as Miss Grand Bangladesh in 2014 and 2015, but she also did not participate in the competition for unknown reasons. In 2021, the right to send Bangladeshi for the 2021 and 2022 competitions was granted to a United States-based Bangladeshi pageant, Miss Bangladesh US Organization, managed by Hiam Amani Hafizuddin. However, the representatives were appointed instead of directly elected through such a national pageant.

The contract between Miss Grand International PCL and Miss Bangladesh US Organization was discontinued in 2023. Later in 2024, the license was granted to an Indian event organizer, Glamanand Group, who is also the Miss Grand India franchise holder.

== International competition ==
The following is a list of Bangladeshi representatives at the Miss Grand International contest.

Color keys

- : Declared as the winner
- : Ended as a runner-up
- : Ended as a finalist
- : Ended as a semifinalist
- : Ended as special awards winner

Year	District	Miss Grand Bangladesh	National Title	Placement	Special Awards	National Director
2026	Chittagong	Anonna Fatima	Miss Intercontinental Bangladesh 2023	Unplaced		Mustafa Islam Duke
Did not compete in 2025
2024	Dhaka	Jessia Islam	Miss World Bangladesh 2017	Unplaced		Nikhil Anand
Did not compete in 2023
2022	Gazipur	Towhida Tusnim Tifa	4th Runner-up Miss World Bangladesh 2017	Unplaced		Hiam Amani
2021	Sylhet	Marjana Chowdhury	Top 25; Miss World America 2019	Unplaced		Hiam Amani
Did not compete in 2020
2019	Dhaka	Mium Khould Hossain	1st Runner-up Miss World Bangladesh 2019	Did not compete		Mium Khould Hossain
Did not compete between 2016 - 2018
2015	Dhaka	Fatimatu Zohra Etisha	Appointed	Did not compete		Fatimatu Zohra Etisha
2014	Dhaka	Fatimatu Zohra Etisha	Appointed	Did not compete		Fatimatu Zohra Etisha
2013	Dhaka	Farhana Azad Limi	Appointed	Did not compete		Farhana Azad Limi
