= Sahoshi Manush Chai =

2003 film by Mohammad Hannan

- Film poster
- Directed by: Mohammad Hannan
- Screenplay by: Mohammad Hannan
- Starring: Sohel Rana; Shakib Khan; Keya; Shahnoor; Wasimul Bari Rajib
- Music by: Alauddin Ali
- Release date: 2003
- Country: Bangladesh
- Language: Bengali

Sahoshi Manush Chai (Bengali: সাহসী মানুষ চাই, lit. 'We want brave men') is a 2003 Bangladeshi film starring Shakib Khan and Keya opposite him. Actors Sohel Rana and Rajib shared the 2003 Bangladesh National Film Award for Best Supporting Actor.

== Cast ==
- Shakib Khan
- Keya
- Sohel Rana
- Shahnoor
- Misha Sawdagor
- Sadek Bachchu
- Rajib
- Rehana Jolly
- Khaleda Aktar Kolpona
- Nasir Khan
- Siraj Haider
- Zamilur Rahman Shakha
- Atikur Rahman Talukder
- Danny Raj
- Afzal Sharif
- Jacky Alamgir
- Babul Ahmed
- Sonia
- Nazma

== Awards ==
Bangladesh National Film Awards

- Best Supporting Actor - Sohel Rana and Rajib
- Best Female Playback Singer - Baby Nazneen
