= Tania Rahman Tonni =

Bangladeshi model

- Beauty pageant titleholder
- Title: Miss Bangladesh 1999
- Major competitions: Miss Bangladesh 1999 (Winner); Miss World 1999 (Unplaced)

Tania Rahman Tonni is a Bangladeshi model and beauty pageant titleholder who was crowned Miss Bangladesh 1999 and represented Bangladesh at Miss World 1999.

Awards and achievements
| Preceded by Rehnuma Dilruba Chitra | Miss Bangladesh; 1998 | Succeeded by Shaila Simi |
