= Anika Taher =

Bangladeshi model

- Beauty pageant titleholder
- Title: Miss Bangladesh 1994
- Major competitions: Miss Bangladesh 1994 (Winner); Miss World 1994 (Unplaced)

Anika Taher is a Bangladeshi model and beauty pageant titleholder who was crowned Miss Bangladesh 1994 and represented Bangladesh at Miss World 1994.

Awards and achievements
Preceded by First Winner	Miss Bangladesh; 1994	Succeeded by Yasmin Bilkis Sathi
