= Hajar Bachhor Dhore =

2005 film by Shuchanda

- VCD Cover
- Directed by: Kohinur Akter Suchanda
- Written by: Zahir Raihan (novel)
- Based on: 'Hajar Bachhor Dhore'(Novel) by Zahir Raihan
- Produced by: Shuchanda Chalachitra
- Starring: Riaz; Shoshi; Shahnoor; Kohinur Akter Suchanda; ATM Shamsuzzaman
- Cinematography: Mahfuzur Rahman Khan
- Edited by: Mazibur Haque Dulu
- Music by: Ahmed Imtiaz Bulbul
- Distributed by: Shuchanda Chalachitra
- Release date: 2005
- Running time: 145 minutes
- Country: Bangladesh
- Language: Bengali

Hajar Bachhor Dhore also (Bengali: হাজার বছর ধরে, English: Symphony of Agony) is a 2005 Bangladeshi Bengali-language film directed by Kohinur Akter Suchanda. Based on Bangladeshi novelist and filmmaker Zahir Raihan's popular novel Hajar Bochhor Dhore, it stars Riaz, newcomer Shoshi, Shahnoor, Kohinur Akter Suchanda, ATM Shamsuzzaman and many more.

Hajar Bachhor Dhore was highly appreciated by film critics and film viewers and won National Film Awards for best film award and in six other categories. The film was also awarded by Meril Prothom Alo Awards with the best film award with three categories.

== Plot ==
The story begins years ago with Kashem, who was rich and not lacking in anything except having a child. His wife finally requests that he marries again so that he can have children. His wife marries him to a younger woman and then kills herself that night by eating a poisonous flower. This began the tradition of polygamy in the family.

Years pass and that house where Kashem lived in is now inhabited by the elderly Makbul, his little brother Montu, along with his cousins and his three wives. His youngest wife Tuni is a teenager. She is in love with her husband's younger brother Montu and Montu also has feelings for her, but they are bound by their love for Makbul.

Montu is also loved by his neighbor Ambia. Everyone notices and makes fun on Montu and Ambia, which angers Tuni. One day Ambia's entire family is wiped out by a disease, though no one bury the bodies for fear of catching the disease. The kind-hearted Montu defies all to bury the bodies and shows great compassion towards Ambia.

Makbul decides to marry Ambia to Montu so that his family can take over all of Ambia's property. Tuni is opposed to this and devises a plan to stop the marriage. She convinces Makbul that he should take Ambia as his fourth wife, as all of the property would then be his, saying that every man should have four wives. Makbul is convinced.

When Makbul tells his family his plans to marry Ambia, his family is infuriated. His wives begin crying in protest and argues that he is too old to marry again. They refuse to give permission to marry, and his cousins also protest. Tuni fuels his fire from behind him. Finally, in anger he divorces is first two wives. His cousin throws a rock at his head, and he becomes sick from his wound. His older two wives leave to their houses crying, since they do not have any reason to stay. His second wife's brother angrily claims that he will marry his sister to a much wealthier man soon.

Soon Makbul dies leaving Tuni all by herself. She is considered his only widow as he divorced his first two wives before he died. Tuni is consumed with guilt as she feels that all of this happened because of her. When Montu sees her wearing the white sari of a widow, he asks her to marry him as she can't stand to see her in such a state. But she tells him that this is her punishment as she caused this downfall of an entire family.

The story flashes back to years in the future where they show that Montu and Ambia have wed. Then they show Tuni is now an elderly widow living out her life in solitude.

A minor story arc shows Makbul's younger cousin who has beat two wives to death already. He mercilessly beats his third wife and when Montu protests he is told to mind his own business as he has no right to tell anyone how to treat their wife. One day Montu sees her attempting suicide, though she does not go through with the plan. He is astounded by a human being's willingness to live no matter how hard their life is. One day when Montu returns from a trip he finds out that the third wife has also been beaten to death. At the end when Makbul is telling the family he wants to marry Ambia, the cousin says that since he does not have a wife he will marry Ambia, to which Tuni replies that he would just beat her to death as well.

== Cast ==
- Riaz as Montu
- Shoshi as Tuni
- Shahnoor as Ambia
- ATM Shamsuzzaman as Mokbul
- Kohinur Akter Suchanda as Tuni's Mother
- Nazma Anwar
- Siraj Haider as Abul
- Amir Siraji as Guno Molla
- Shahidul Alam Sachchu as Monowar Haji
- Anisur Rahman Milon as Karim Sheikh

== Music ==
Hajar Bachhor Dhore the film was music directed and composed by Ahmed Imtiaz Bulbul. But a song first part lyrics by Zahir Raihan, song as Asha Chhilo Mone Mone..

=== Sound track ===
Track	Songs	Singers	Lyrics	Music	Notes
1	Asha Chhilo Mone Mone	Subir Nandi	Zahir Raihan	Ahmed Imtiaz Bulbul	
2	Tumi Sutoi Bedhechho	Subir Nandi and Anupoma Mukti	Gazi Mazharul Anwar	Ahmed Imtiaz Bulbul	Title song
3	Holdi Lagaia Konya	Uma Khan		Ahmed Imtiaz Bulbul	
4	Ei Dunia Dui Dineri	Andrew Kishore		Ahmed Imtiaz Bulbul	
5	Vatuire Na Diyo Saree			Ahmed Imtiaz Bulbul	

== Awards and achievements ==
=== National Film Awards ===
Hajar Bachhor Dhore the film won best film in 2005 as well as six other categories in the National Film Awards of Bangladesh.

- Winner Best Film, Suchanda Chalachitra 2005
- Winner Best Director, Kohinur Akter Suchanda 2005
- Winner Best Music Director, Ahmed Imtiaz Bulbul 2005
- Winner Best Story, Zahir Raihan (Posthumous) 2005
- Winner Best Cinemagrapher (Color), Mahfuzur Rahman Khan 2005
- Winner Best Art Director, Mohammad Kolamtor 2005

=== BACHASAS Film Awards ===
Hajar Bachhor Dhore the film was gets won BACHASAS Film Awards of Bangladesh best Female Playback Singer in the year 2005.

- Winner Best Female Playback Singer, Anupoma Mukti 2005

== Meril-Prothom Alo Awards ==
Hajar Bachhor Dhore the film won in three categories at the Meril Prothom Alo Awards in 2005.

- Winner Best Film, Suchanda Chalachitra 2005
- Winner Best Director, Kohinur Akter Suchanda 2005
- Winner Best Actor, Riaz 2005
- Winner Best Actress, Shashi 2005
