= Baby Naznin =

Bangladeshi singer

Baby Naznin বেবী নাজনীন
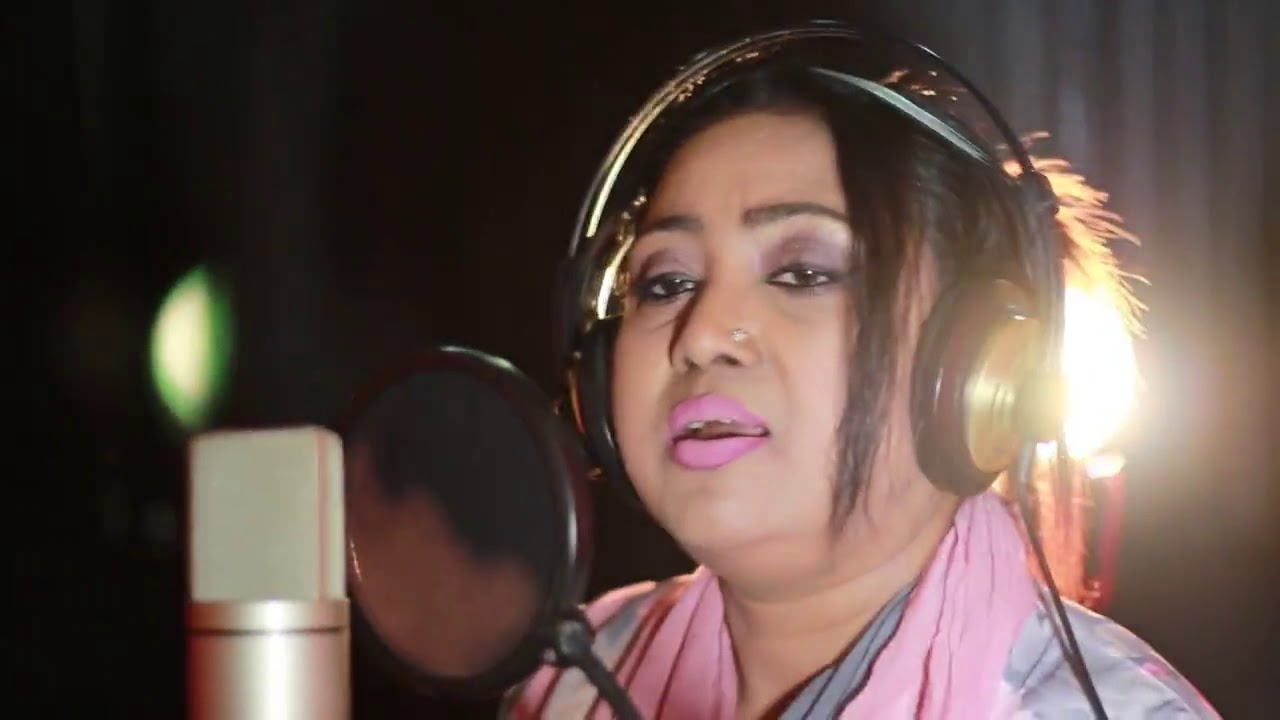
- Naznin in 2018

Background information
- Born: 23 August 1965 (age 61); Nilphamari District, Bangladesh
- Genre: Modern
- Years active: 1976-present

Baby Naznin (born 23 August 1965) is a Bangladeshi singer. She won the Bachsas Award 2002 and 2003 for Best Female Playback Singer. She also won the 2003 Bangladesh National Film Award for Best Female Playback Singer for her performance in the film Sahoshi Manush Chai. She is dubbed "Black Diamond" in Bangladesh. Her notable songs include "Manush Nishpap Prithibite Ashe", "Amar Akta Manush Ache", "Patramita", "Elomelo Batashe", and "Oi Rangdhanu Theke".

== Background ==
Naznin was born on 23 August 1965 in Saidpur, Nilphamari in what was then East Pakistan, and is now Bangladesh. She has a sister, Lini Sabrin. Her first lesson in song was started under her father, Mansur Sarkar. She started singing on stage when she was just seven years old. She sang her first movie song in 1980. In her early days, Naznin was also a volleyball player and once represented Rajshahi Division.

== Career ==
In 1987, Naznin released 12 modern songs as her first album, Patramita, under the music direction of Maksud Jamil Mintu. Then the albums Nisshobdo Sur, Kal Sara Raat, Prem Korileo Daay, and Duchokhe Ghum Aase Na strengthened her position in modern songs. She released her 50th solo album in 2014.

So far, Naznin has released over two hundred mixed albums. She also has three books of poetry in the market named Shey, Thotey Bhalobasha and Priyomukh.

Naznin sought nomination to compete at the Nilphamari-4 constituency representing the Bangladesh Nationalist Party (BNP) for the 2018 Bangladeshi general election. As of November 2020, she resides in the United States and serving as the assistant secretary for international affairs of the BNP.

== Works ==
Albums

- Shankha Nadir Majhi (2011)

== Film songs ==
Year	Film	Song	Composer(s)	Songwriter(s)	Co-artist(s)
1988	Heera Moti	"Antore Enkechhi Tomari Chhobi"	Alauddin Ali	Amjad Hossain	Rafiqul Alam
1989	Sakkhi Proman	"Amar Hater Chotpoti Aar Phuchka"	Ahmed Imtiaz Bulbul		solo
1990	Biplob	"Dekha Holo Kalke"	Alam Khan	Moniruzzaman Monir	solo
1991	Kashem Malar Prem	"Amar Haar Kala Korlam Re"	Ahmed Imtiaz Bulbul	Ahmed Imtiaz Bulbul	M A Khalek
1991	Kashem Malar Prem	"Bhulbona Bhulbona Bondhu"	Ahmed Imtiaz Bulbul	Ahmed Imtiaz Bulbul	M A Khalek
1991	Kashem Malar Prem	"Allahke Rakhiya Sakkhi"	Ahmed Imtiaz Bulbul	Ahmed Imtiaz Bulbul	M A Khalek
1991	Kashem Malar Prem	"Jeona Jeona"	Ahmed Imtiaz Bulbul	Ahmed Imtiaz Bulbul	solo
1991	Ochena	"Ekti Taka Daona"	Alam Khan	Moniruzzaman Monir	Syed Abdul Hadi
1991	Satya Mithya	"Asitechhe Kaka"	Alam Khan	Moniruzzaman Monir	Khurshid Alam
1991	Shoshurbari	"Ek Pallay Sokhi Amar"	Satya Saha	Ahmed Zaman Chowdhury	Syed Abdul Hadi
1992	Ajker Hangama	"Amader Ei Ghor Ei Songsar"	Alam Khan	Moniruzzaman Monir	Sabina Yasmin, Kumar Biswajit
1992	Beporowa	"Manush Nishpap Prithibite Ase"	Alam Khan	Kabir Anwar	
1992	Danga	"Ekul Aar Okul"	Ahmed Imtiaz Bulbul		Rathindranath Roy
1992	Maa Mati Desh	"O Pagla"	Alam Khan		Andrew Kishore
1992	Mastan Raja	"Dukkho Jodi Ase"	Ali Hossain	Dewan Nazrul	Shamima Yasmin Diba
1992	Professor	"Purnimar Ee Chand Jeno Esechhe Amar Ghore"	Anwar Parvez	Gazi Mazharul Anwar	Khurshid Alam
1992	Professor	"Duti Mone, Songopone"	Anwar Parvez	Gazi Mazharul Anwar	Khurshid Alam
1992	Professor	"Duti Chokhe Tumi Chhara"	Anwar Parvez	Gazi Mazharul Anwar	Khurshid Alam
1993	Banglar Bodhu	"Tumi Ami Dujon Jadur Baksho"	Alam Khan	Moniruzzaman Monir	Khurshid Alam
1993	Noya Laila Noya Mojnu	"Laila Go Laila"	Anwar Parvez	Ahmed Zaman Chowdhury	Khalid Hasan Milu
1993	Tyaag	"Darling Darling Shonona"	Alam Khan	Moniruzzaman Monir	Andrew Kishore
1993	Tyaag	"Bolona Kothay Chhile"	Alam Khan	Moniruzzaman Monir	Andrew Kishore
1993	Tyaag	"Kagojer Taka Phorphor Kore"	Alam Khan	Moniruzzaman Monir	solo
1994	Abolombon	"Mone Rekho Chirondin, Bhalobasha Jeno Thake" (part 1)	Ali Hossain	Mohammad Rafiquzzaman	Sabina Yasmin, chorus
1994	Abolombon	"Mone Rekho Chirodin, Bhalobasha Jeno Thake" (part 2)	Ali Hossain	Mohammad Rafiquzzaman	Sabina Yasmin, chorus
1994	Abolombon	"Baja Re Dhol Baja"	Ali Hossain	Mohammad Rafiquzzaman	Khalid Hasan Milu
1994	Abolombon	"Tomay Keno Bhalobashi"	Ali Hossain	Mohammad Rafiquzzaman	Khalid Hasan Milu
1994	Abolombon	"Eto Je Piriti"	Ali Hossain	Mohammad Rafiquzzaman	solo
1994	Agun Jole	"Elomelo Batase Uriyechi Sharir Achil"	Maksud Jamil Mintu	Maksud Jamil Mintu	solo
1994	Chand Kumari Chashar Chhele	"Ami Chashar Chhele Go" (duet)	Ahmed Imtiaz Bulbul		Tapan Chowdhury
1994	Kaliya	"Bhalobashar Ekti Ghore"	Ali Hossain	Dewan Nazrul	Khalid Hasan Milu
1994	Raag Anurag	"Tumi Amar Moner Pan Supari"	Anwar Jahan Nantu	Delwar Jahan Jhontu	Andrew Kishore
1994	Raag Anurag	"Tumi Amar Kokil Kuku"	Anwar Jahan Nantu	Delwar Jahan Jhontu	Andrew Kishore
1994	Stree Hotya	"Ami Tomar Tota Pakhi"	Abu Taher	Moniruzzaman Monir	Khalid Hasan Milu
1994	Stree Hotya	"Mic Lagaiya Kando"	Abu Taher	Moniruzzaman Monir	Andrew Kishore
1994	Stree Hotya	"Tumi Chhara Ami Bolo"	Abu Taher	Moniruzzaman Monir	solo
1995	Dost Amar Dushmon	"Tomake Bhalobashina"	Abu Taher	Gazi Mazharul Anwar, Moniruzzaman Monir, Jahanara Bhuiyan	solo
1995	Hingsa	"Kaal Raate Bichhanate"	Ahmed Imtiaz Bulbul	Ahmed Imtiaz Bulbul	Andrew Kishore
1995	Hingsa	"Priyare Priya"	Ahmed Imtiaz Bulbul	Ahmed Imtiaz Bulbul	M A Khalek
1995	Hingsa	"Tumi Amar Bari"	Ahmed Imtiaz Bulbul	Ahmed Imtiaz Bulbul	solo
1995	Kanyadan	"Shono Shono Khukumoni"	Anwar Jahan Nantu	Delwar Jahan Jhontu	solo
1995	Lalu Sordar	"Ami Emon Ekti Chheleke Dekhechhi"	Satya Saha	Gazi Mazharul Anwar	solo
1995	Mohamilon	"Prithibike Sakkhi Rekhe"	Ahmed Imtiaz Bulbul	Ahmed Imtiaz Bulbul	Syed Abdul Hadi
1995	Mohamilon	"Prothome Bondona Kori"	Ahmed Imtiaz Bulbul	Ahmed Imtiaz Bulbul	Agun
1995	Premer Ohongkar	"Jibon Jotoi Hokna Chhoto"	Alam Khan	Mohammad Hannan	solo
1996	Bashiwala	"O Amar Laili"	Abu Taher		Andrew Kishore
1996	Bichar Hobe	"Maa Chhara Je Ei Duniyaya"	Alam Khan	Milton Khondokar	solo
1996	Bidrohi Premik	"Ontorete Achhe Seto"	Anwar Parvez	Milton Khondokar	solo
1996	Bidrohi Premik	"Bidrohi Premik Ami"	Anwar Parvez	Milton Khondokar	Andrew Kishore
1996	Goriber Songsar	"Tui Jaaner Amar Moyna Pakhi Ti"	Anwar Jahan Jhontu	Delwar Jahan Nantu	Khurshid Alam
1996	Goriber Songsar	"Rupero Rongbajite Chokhero Isharate"	Anwar Jahan Jhontu	Delwar Jahan Nantu	Andrew Kishore
1996	Jibon Songsar	"Jemon Kukur Temon Mugur"	Abu Taher		Andrew Kishore
1996	Moumachhi	"Kajiparar Haji Babar Boro Meye"	Anwar Parvez	Gazi Mazharul Anwar	Khalid Hasan Milu
1996	Moumachhi	"Jwole Jwole Pani Dile"	Anwar Parvez	Gazi Mazharul Anwar	Andrew Kishore and Runa Laila
1997	Amma	"Natbou Go"			Abida Sultana
1997	Attosat	"Moneri Diaryte"	Anwar Parvez	Milton Khondokar	Andrew Kishore
1997	Banglar Bodhu	"O Rongila"			M A Khalek
1997	Buker Bhitor Agun	"Pathore Likhini Kkhoye Jabe"	Noor Mannan		Hasan Chowdhury
1997	Dorodi Sontan	"Priyotoma Go"	Shawkat Ali Emon	Gazi Mazharul Anwar, Jewel Mahmud, Kabir Bakul	Agun
1997	Noropishach	"Aay Chhelera, Aay Meyera, Golpo Shune Jaa"	Alam Khan	Kabir Bakul	solo
1998	Bhalobashar Ghor	"Priyo Priyo Priyo Tumi"	Abu Taher	Moniruzzaman Monir	Khalid Hasan Milu
1998	Dui Rongbaz	"Gorom Gorom Istiri"	Ahmed Imtiaz Bulbul, Alauddin Ali	Ahmed Imtiaz Bulbul, Gazi Mazharul Anwar, Amir Siraji	solo
1998	Nishpap Bodhu	"Tumi Je Amat"	Anwar Jahan Nantu	Abdul Hai Al Hadi, Moniruzzaman Monir, Delwar Jahan Jhontu	M. A. Khalek
1999	Lonkakando	N/A	Alam Khan	Moniruzzaman Monir	N/A
1999	Miss Diana	"Sona Bondhu Tui Amare"	Alauddin Ali		Agun
1999	Parle Thekao	"Jole Re Agun, Jedike Takai"	Abu Taher	Moniruzzaman Monir, Jahanara Bhuiyan	solo
1999	Rani Keno Dakaat	"Ami Shudhu Tomake Chai"	Abu Taher	Moniruzzaman Monir	Andrew Kishore
2000	Bishe Bhora Nagin	"Ami Eito Achhi Tomar Kachhe"	Anwar Jahan Nantu		solo
2000	Bishe Bhora Nagin	"Ami Tomar Moner Sathi"	Anwar Jahan Nantu		solo
2000	Bishe Bhora Nagin	"Nache Nagin, Baje Re Been"	Anwar Jahan Nantu		solo
2000	Borsha Badol	"Chokhe Amar Neshar Kajol"	Ali Akram Shuvo		solo
2000	Churmaar	"O Priya Priya, Prem Amar"	Anwar Jahan Nantu		Polash
2000	Dujon Dujonar	"Dao Tumi Dao Saara"	Shawkat Ali Emon	Moniruzzaman Monir	Khalid Hasan Milu
2000	Karishma	"Dure Gele Bukta"	Alauddin Ali	Gazi Mazharul Anwar, Mohammad Rafiquzzaman, Moniruzzaman Monir	Agun
2000	Karishma	"Bhromorta Gunguniye"	Alauddin Ali	Gazi Mazharul Anwar, Mohammad Rafiquzzaman, Moniruzzaman Monir	solo
2000	Khaichi Tore	"O Tumi Mon, Tumi Asha"	Alam Khan		solo
2000	Teji Sontan	"Ei Modhur Raate Tomar Sathe"	Abu Taher	Moniruzzaman Monir, Jahanara Bhuiyan	Agun
2001	Mejaj Gorom	"Norom Norom Gaal Dekhe"	Emon Saha		Agun
2001	Moron Niye Khela	"Korona Kichhu Korona"	Alauddin Ali		Polash
2001	Shikari	"Sundori Tui Joldi"	Emon Saha	Kabir Bakul	Agun
2001	Shopner Bashor	"Premer Chhuri Dao Bosiye"	Alauddin Ali	Munshi Wadud	solo
2002	Arman	"N/A"	Alauddin Ali	Kabir Bakul	Asif Akbar
2002	Bipodjonok	"Ei Jogot Songsare	Ahmed Imtiaz Bulbul	Ahmed Imtiaz Bulbul	Asif Akbar
2002	Boba Khuni	"Amar Buke Premer Golap"	Ali Akram Shuvo	Moniruzzaman Monir, Jahanara Bhuiyan	Andrew Kishore
2002	Boba Khuni	"Konta Dhoira Konta Chhari"	Ali Akram Shuvo	Moniruzzaman Monir, Jahanara Bhuiyan	Agun
2002	Itihas	"Tumi Koi, Tumi Koi"	Ahmed Imtiaz Bulbul	Ahmed Imtiaz Bulbul	Asif
2002	Karishma	"Premer Pathshalate"	Alam Khan		Asif
2002	Karishma	"Janure Kichhu Chainare"	Alam Khan		Asif
2002	Karishma	"Bhalobashte Ami Chaire"	Alam Khan		solo
2002	Mastaner Upor Mastan	"Amar Kemon Kemon Jani Laage"	Alam Khan		Andrew Kishore
2002	Mastaner Upor Mastan	"Esona Ogo Sona"	Alam Khan		solo
2002	Probesh Nishesh	"Duti Mone Jokhoni To Prem Hoy"	Shawkat Ali Emon	N/A	Andrew Kishore
2002	Swami Streer Juddho	"Bhalobashi Ei Kothati, Hoyni Bola"	Shawkat Ali Emon	Kabir Bakul	Kanak Chapa, Andrew Kishore
2003	Big Boss	"Hridoye Premeri Piyasa"	Alauddin Ali	Kabir Bakul	Andrew Kishore
2003	Bir Soinik	"Banglar Bodhu" (female)	Anwar Jahan Nantu	Delwar Jahan Jhontu	solo
2003	Bou Shashurir Juddho	"Bou Shashurir Juddhe Ami"	Anwar Parvez	Moniruzzaman Monir	chorus
2003	Chai Khomota	"Gotokal O Khali Chhilo"	Alam Khan	Kabir Bakul	Andrew Kishore
2003	Dui Bodhu Ek Shami	"Bhalobashte Giye Ami"	Alam Khan	Kabir Bakul	Sabina Yasmin, Kumar Biswajit
2003	Gopon Astana	"Ei Chokher Ishara Ki Tumi Bojhona"			Khalid Hasan Milu
2003	Khuner Porinam	"Chupi Chupi Ektu Shono"	Shawkat Ali Emon	Kabir Bakul	Andrew Kishore
2003	Matir Phool	"Bondhu Amar Janeri Jaan"	Shawkat Ali Emon		solo
2003	Noyon Bhora Jol	"Tumi Ei Buke Sukher Pakhi"	Alauddin Ali	Mohammad Hannan	solo
2003	Satyer Bijoy	"Tumi Jedin"	Emon Saha	Kabir Bakul	solo
2003	Shahoshi Manush Chai	"Ami Agune Jolina"	Alauddin Ali	Mohammad Hannan	solo
2003	Shahoshi Manush Chai	"O Rongila Amar"	Alauddin Ali	Mohammad Hannan	Polash
2003	Top Somrat	"Shopne Shopne Se Asere"	Alam Khan	Kabir Bakul	solo
2004	Baap Betar Lorai	"Chondromukhi Ami"	Shawkat Ali Emon	Kabir Bakul	solo
2004	Dhor Shoytan	"Six Zero Sixie"	Ali Akram Shuvo	Kabir Bakul	Reshad
2005	Badha	"Amar Jogot Songsar"	Ahmed Imtiaz Bulbul	Ahmed Imtiaz Bulbul	Monir Khan
2005	Badha	"Manush Bachar Jonno"	Ahmed Imtiaz Bulbul	Ahmed Imtiaz Bulbul	Monir Khan
2005	Bhalobasha Bhalobasha	"Saat Ronga Premer Shopno"	Ahmed Imtiaz Bulbul	Ahmed Imtiaz Bulbul	Andrew Kishore
2005	Bishakto Chokh	"Hayre Hay Kichhu Koro Na"	Shawkat Ali Emon	Kabir Bakul	Badshah Bulbul
2005	Bishakto Chokh	"Korona Prem Kichhu Khon"	Shawkat Ali Emon	Kabir Bakul	Rupom
2005	Bondhok	"Gachhta Hoilo Sobuj Bondhu"	Emon Saha	A K Sohel	Monir Khan
2005	Chhotto Ektu Bhalobasha	"Shohor Theke Ailo Gaaye"	Devendranath Chattopadhyay	Munshi Wadud	Polash
2005	Chhotto Ektu Bhalobasha	"Potrikate Lekha Holo"	Devendranath Chattopadhyay	Kabir Bakul	solo
2005	Ekrokha	"Dewana Re Dewana"			Asif Akbar
2005	Takar Nesha	"Korona Korona Amay Bondi Korona"	Shawkat Ali Emon		Andrew Kishore
2006	Banglar Hero	"Aaj Sara Raat, Ami Je Tomar"	Emon Saha	Kabir Bakul	S. I. Tutul
2006	Dajjal Shashuri	"Ke Tumi Ruposi Konna"	Emon Saha	N/A	Monir Khan
2006	Dajjal Shashuri	"Amay Bhuilo Na Go"	Emon Saha	N/A	Monir Khan
2006	Daku Fulon	"Ami Deewana, Shudhu Tomar Deewana"	Ahamed Kislu"	N/A	N/A
2006	Hira Amar Naam	"Tomar Bari Amar Barir Moddhe Ekta Nodi"	Shawkat Ali Emon	Kabir Bakul	Asif Akbar
2006	Jonmo	"Kotodin Pore Tumi Bolle"	Ahmed Imtiaz Bulbul	Ahmed Imtiaz Bulbul	Monir Khan
2006	Sathi Tumi Kar?	"O Shagorer Pani"	Ahmed Imtiaz Bulbul	Ahmed Imtiaz Bulbul	solo
2006	Sathi Tumi Kar?	"Monta Chui Mui Kore"	Ahmed Imtiaz Bulbul	Ahmed Imtiaz Bulbul	solo
2006	Thanda Mathar Khuni	"Jibom Sathi"	Ali Akram Shuvo		S I Tutul
2006	Tokair Hate Ostro Keno	"Ekjon Krishno Pele Radha Hobo"	Ahmed Imtiaz Bulbul		solo
2007	Amar Praner Swami	"Koi Gela Nithur Bondhure"	Shawkat Ali Emon	Kabir Bakul	Omi
2007	Jomoj	"Mon Bojhona"	Ali Akram Shuvo	Kabir Bakul	Anima D'Costa
2007	Rokto Pipasha	"Bosonto Chhuyechhe Amari Mon"	S I Tutul	Ponkoj	solo
2007	Swamir Somgsar	"Bhenge Gechhe Biswas"	Ali Akram Shuvo	Moniruzzaman Monir	solo
2007	Swamir Somgsar	"Chokher Saamne Thakle"	Ali Akram Shuvo	Moniruzzaman Monir	Kumar Biswajit
2007	Tomar Jonyo Morte Pari	"Chupi Chupi Bole Mon"	Ali Akram Shuvo	Kabir Bakul	Asif Akbar
2007	Tumi Achho Hridoye	"Shopne Shopne Se Asere"	S. I. Tutul	Kabir Bakul	solo
2007	Tumi Achho Hridoye	"Buke Boro Koshto"	S. I. Tutul	Kabir Bakul	Asif Akbar
2007	Ulta Palta 69	"Tumi Ki Jaadu Jano"	Ali Akram Shuvo	Kabir Bakul	Andrew Kishore
2008	Amader Chhoto Saheb	"Tomake Cahi Ami Aro Kachhe"	Alauddin Ali	Gazi Mazharul Anwar, Mohammed Rafiquzzaman, Kabir Bakul	Monir Khan
2008	Ek Takar Bou	"Aula Premer Baula Batash"	Shawkat Ali Emon	Kabir Bakul	Monir Khan
2008	Mone Prane Acho Tumi	"Kachhe Asa Holo, Bhalobasha Holo"	Emon Saha, Ahmed Imtiaz Bulbul		Andrew Kishore
2008	Pashaner Prem	"Jalaili Re, Jalaili"	Alauddin Ali	Gazi Mazharul Anwar	solo
2008	Tumi Amar Prem	"Etodin Dure Dure Chhile"	Alauddin Ali		solo
2009	Bolona Kobul	"Khopa Koira Chul"	Shawkat Ali Emon	N/A	solo
2009	Bondhu Maya Lagaichhe	"Chhuiyo Na, Chhuiyo Na"	Emon Saha	Abu Sufian	Polash
2009	Opare Akash	"Prem Priti Bhalobasha"	Khayem Ahmed	Shahabuddin Majumder	solo
2010	5 Takar Prem	"Holdi Baato Mehndi Baato"	Shawkat Ali Emon	Kabir Bakul	Agun
2010	Abar Ekti Juddho	"Aaj Holo Budhbar"			Asif Akbar
2010	Bap Boro Na Shoshur Boro	"Maya Maya Bondhu Ki Je"			Monir Khan
2010	Bap Boro Na Shoshur Boro	"Apobader Kolongko"			solo
2010	Chachchu Amar Chachchu	"Ami Ekdin"	Shawkat Ali Emon	Kabir Bakul	kumar Biswajit
2010	Moynamotir Songsar	"Matir Kole Gachher Jibon"	Ali Akram Shuvo	Ali Azad	Monir Khan
2010	Takar Cheyeo Prem Boro	"Ailore Ailore"	Shawkat Ali Emon	Kabir Bakul	solo
2011	King Khan	"Ami Preme Porechhi"	Ali Akram Shuvo	Kabir Bakul	S. I. Tutul
N/A	Devdas	"Jodi Partam, Nodir Jole Jaala Juraitam"	N/A	N/A	solo
N/A	Gorom Mosla	"Ek Nojor Na Dekhle Tomay	Emom Saha	Kabir Bakul	Monir Khan
