= Miss World 2000 =

International beauty pageant

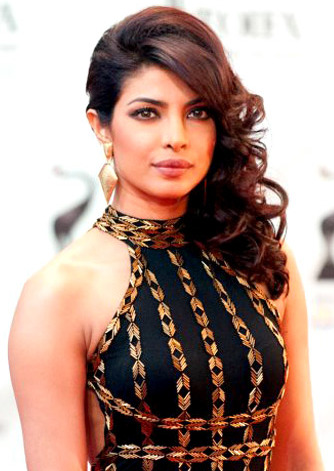
- Miss World 2000 titleholder – Priyanka Chopra
- Date: 30 November 2000
- Presenters: Jerry Springer; Rebecca de Alba
- Entertainment: Bryan Ferry; Bond; S Club 7
- Venue: Millennium Dome, London, United Kingdom
- Broadcaster: E!; Channel 5
- Entrants: 95
- Placements: 10
- Debuts: Belarus; England; Moldova; Northern Ireland
- Withdrawals: Guyana; Latvia; Liberia; Seychelles; Sint Maarten; Swaziland; Thailand; United Kingdom; Zambia
- Returns: Barbados; British Virgin Islands; Curaçao; Denmark; Namibia; Taiwan
- Winner: Priyanka Chopra; India

Miss World 2000 was the 50th anniversary of the Miss World pageant, held at the Millennium Dome in London, United Kingdom on 30 November 2000. Portions of the pageant were also filmed in the Maldives.

At the end of the event, Yukta Mookhey of India crowned Priyanka Chopra of India as Miss World 2000. She is the fifth Miss World and the second successive winner from her country. Internationally, Chopra reigned alongside Miss Universe 2000 titleholder Lara Dutta, marking the most recent time (as of 2026) that any country has held the two most prestigious beauty pageant titles in the world in a single year since 1994. Runner-Up was Giorgia Palmas representing Italy and third was Yüksel Ak representing Turkey.

== Background ==
The pageant was the first since the death of pageant owner Eric Morley, whose widow Julia Morley assumed responsibility for the event. The pageant had 95 contestants, the highest number of Miss World participants at that time.

=== Selection of participants ===
==== Replacements ====
Jacqueline Bracamontes of Mexico, won Nuestra Belleza Mundo México 2000 and supposed to compete, however she decided to enter Nuestra Belleza Mexico 2000 and won the contest, but as she won 2 contests Lupita Jones president of Nuestra Belleza México, decides to appoint Paulina Flores Arias to compete.

Miss Moldova 2000, Irina Babusenko withdrew from the competition due to her being underage. She was replaced by her first runner-up, Mariana Moraru.

==== Debuts, returns, and, withdrawals ====
This edition marked the debut of Belarus, England, Moldova and Northern Ireland, and the return of Barbados, the British Virgin Islands, Curaçao, Denmark, Namibia and Taiwan; Barbados and Denmark last competed in 1995, Namibia last competed in 1997, and the British Virgin Islands, Curaçao and Taiwan last competed in 1998.

Guyana, Latvia, Liberia, Seychelles, Sint Maarten, Swaziland, Thailand, the United Kingdom and Zambia, withdrew from the competition.

== Results ==
=== Placements ===
Placement	Contestant
Miss World 2000	India – Priyanka Chopra
1st Runner-Up	Italy – Giorgia Palmas
2nd Runner-Up	Turkey – Yüksel Ak
Top 5	Kazakhstan – Margarita Kravtsova; Uruguay – Katja Thomsen Grien
Top 10	Chile – Isabel Bawlitza; Colombia – Andrea Durán; Kenya – Yolande Masinde; Ukraine – Olena Scherban; United States – Angelique Breaux

==== Continental Queens of Beauty ====
Continental Group	Contestant
Africa	Kenya – Yolanda Masinde
Americas	Uruguay – Katja Thomsen
Asia	India – Priyanka Chopra
Caribbean	Curacao – Jozaine Marianella Wall
Europe	Italy – Giorgia Palmas

== Judges ==
- Stephanie Beacham
- Ozwald Boateng
- Errol Brown †
- Lulu
- Terry O'Neill †
- Lucy Sykes
- Hemant Trivedi
- Amanda Wakeley
- Shah Rukh Khan

== Contestants ==
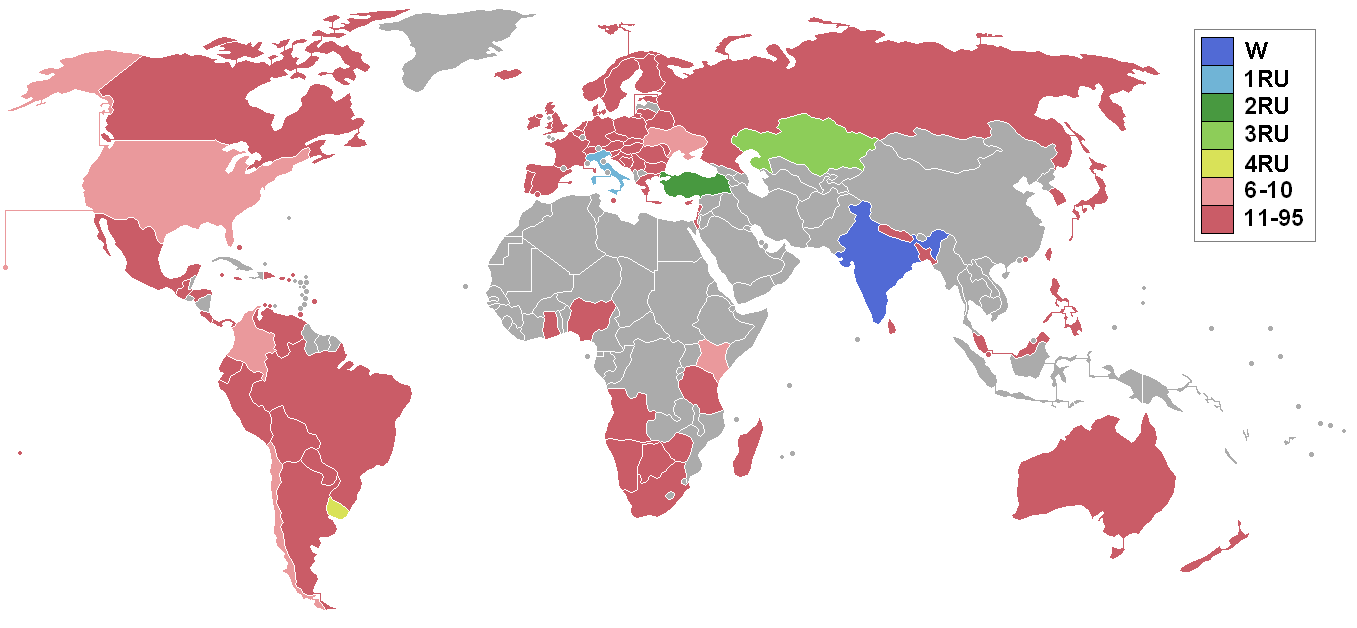
Countries and territories which sent delegates, and results for Miss World 2000

95 contestants competed for the title.

Country/Territory	Contestant	Age (Note: Ages at the time of the pageant)	Hometown
Angola	Deolinda Vilela	23	Luanda
Argentina	Daniela Stucan	19	Buenos Aires
Aruba	Monique van der Horn	21	Oranjestad
Australia	Renee Henderson	23	Melbourne
Austria	Patricia Kaiser	16	Linz
Bahamas	Latia Bowe	23	Nassau
Bangladesh	Sonia Gazi	21	Dhaka
Barbados	Leilani McConney	19	Bridgetown
Belarus	Sviatlana Kruk	21	Grodno
Belgium	Joke van de Velde	20	Melle
Bolivia	Jimena Rico	22	Cochabamba
Bosnia and Herzegovina	Jasmina Mahmutović	19	Bihać
Botswana	Puna Keleabetswe Serati	21	Mochudi
Brazil	Francine Eickemberg	18	Camboriú
British Virgin Islands	Nadia Harrigan Ubinas	23	Tortola
Bulgaria	Ivanka Peytcheva	19	Pasardzhik
Canada	Christine Cho	21	Toronto
Cayman Islands	Jacqueline Bush	25	George Town
Chile	Isabel Bawlitza	24	Linares
Colombia	Andrea Durán	24	Bogotá
Costa Rica	Cristina de Mezerville	22	Heredia
Croatia	Andreja Čupor	18	Ozalj
Curaçao	Jozaine Wall	18	Willemstad
Cyprus	Ifigenia Papaioannou	19	Limassol
Czech Republic	Michaela Salačová	18	Moravské Budějovice
Denmark	Anne Katrin Vrang	23	Copenhagen
Dominican Republic	Gilda Jovine	20	Santo Domingo
Ecuador	Ana Dolores Murillo	20	Portoviejo
England	Michelle Walker	19	Liverpool
Estonia	Irina Ovtchinnikova	21	Tallinn
Finland	Salima Peippo	18	Turku
France	Karine Meier	20	Meurthe-et-Moselle
French Polynesia (Note: Competed as Tahiti in the pageant)	Vanini Bea	19	Papeete
Germany	Natascha Berg	20	Mannheim
Ghana	Maame Ewarfaah Hawkson	22	Accra
Gibraltar	Tessa Sacramento	19	Gibraltar
Greece	Athanasia Tzoulaki	18	Peloponnese
Guatemala	Cindy Ramírez	24	Guatemala City
Holland	Raja Moussaoui	24	Roermond
Honduras	Verónica Rivera	17	Cortés
Hong Kong	Margaret Kan	20	Hong Kong
Hungary	Judit Kuchta	21	Budapest
Iceland	Elva Dögg Melsteð	21	Reykjavík
India	Priyanka Chopra	18	Jharkhand
Ireland	Yvonne Ellard	21	Tipperary
Israel	Dana Dantes	19	Tel Aviv
Italy	Giorgia Palmas	18	Cagliari
Jamaica	Ayisha Richards	24	Kingston
Japan	Mariko Sugai	23	Tokyo
Kazakhstan	Margarita Kravtsova	19	Almaty
Kenya	Yolanda Masinde	21	Nairobi
Lebanon	Sandra Rizk	18	Beirut
Lithuania	Martyna Bimbaitė	16	Palanga
Madagascar	Julianna Todimarina	17	Toamasina
Malaysia	Tan Sun Wei	24	Kuala Lumpur
Malta	Katia Grima	19	Valletta
Mexico	Paulina Flores Arias	20	Culiacán
Moldova	Mariana Moraru †	16	Chișinău
Namibia	Mia de Klerk	21	Windhoek
Nepal	Usha Khadgi	21	Kathmandu
New Zealand	Katherine Allsopp-Smith	21	Auckland
Nigeria	Matilda Kerry	19	Benin City
Northern Ireland	Julie Lee-Ann Martin	20	Belfast
Norway	Stine Pedersen	21	Oslo
Panama	Ana Raquel Ochy	22	Panama City
Paraguay	Patricia Villanueva	17	Asunción
Peru	Tatiana Angulo	23	Trujillo
Philippines	Katherine de Guzman	20	San Carlos
Poland	Justyna Bergmann	18	Warsaw
Portugal	Gilda Dias Pe-Curto	21	Lisbon
Puerto Rico	Sarybel Velilla	24	Toa Alta
Romania	Aleksandra Cosmoiu	20	Bucharest
Russia	Anna Bodareva	19	Moscow
Scotland	Michelle Watson	19	Motherwell
Singapore	Charlyn Ding	19	Singapore
Slovakia	Janka Horečná	20	Žilina
Slovenia	Maša Merc	22	Maribor
South Africa	Heather Joy Hamilton	23	Durban
South Korea (Note: Competed as Korea in the pageant)	Jung-sun Shin	20	Seoul
Spain	Verónica García	20	Madrid
Sri Lanka	Ganga Gunasekera	25	Colombo
Sweden	Ida Sofia Manneh	23	Stockholm
Switzerland	Mahara McKay	19	Zürich
(Chinese Taipei) Taiwan (Note: Competed as Chinese Taipei in the pageant)	Shu-Ting Hao	22	Taipei
Tanzania	Jacqueline Ntuyabelikwe	21	Dar es Salaam
Trinidad and Tobago	Rhonda Rosemin	23	Port of Spain
Turkey	Yüksel Ak	20	Istanbul
Ukraine	Olena Shcherban	17	Kyiv
United States	Angelique Breaux	22	Los Angeles
United States Virgin Islands	Luciah Hedrington	20	Saint Thomas
Uruguay	Katja Thomsen	18	Montevideo
Venezuela	Vanessa Cárdenas	19	Maracaibo
Wales	Sophie-Kate Cahill	17	Cardiff
Yugoslavia	Iva Milivojević	19	Belgrade
Zimbabwe	Victoria Moyo	21	Harare

== Notes ==
=== Replacements ===
- Denmark – Cecilie Elisa Dahlstrøm
- Russia – Ekaterina Izmail - Dethroned of her crown due to differences with her Organization, just 2 weeks prior leaving for the pageant.

=== Withdrawals ===
- Guyana – No contest.
- Latvia – Miss Latvia 1999, Dina Kalandārova withdrew at the last minute for personal reasons. She competed in Miss World 2001 instead.
- Liberia
- Seychelles – No contest.
- Sint Maarten – Miss Saint Maarten 2000, Angelique Romou went to Miss Universe instead.
- Swaziland – Their national pageant was delayed until next year.
- Thailand – No contest.
- United Kingdom – No longer competes as United Kingdom. Now competes as its constituent countries instead, England, Northern Ireland, Scotland and Wales.
- Zambia – No contest.
