= Shahnoor =

Bangladeshi actress

- শাহনূর
- Born: Syeda Kamrun Naher Shahnoor; 10 February; Narail
- Occupations: Actress, Model
- Years active: 2000–present
- Notable work: Hajar Bachhor Dhore, Sahoshi Manush Chai, Swapner Bashor, Noyon Vora Jol.

Shahnoor is a Bangladeshi actress and model who acted in films and television dramas and became model in TVCs. Her most notable works include Hajar Bachhor Dhore, Sahoshi Manush Chai, Swapner Bashor, Noyon Vora Jol.

== Biography ==
Syeda Kamrun Naher Shahnoor began her journey in Dhallywood with Fasir Adesh. This film was an unreleased film. Her first released film was Jiddi Sontan which was released in 2000. Rubel was her co-star in that film. She acted in Sahoshi Manush Chai and Karagar in 2003. Sahoshi Manush Chai won National Film Award in two categories and Karagar won National Film Award in one category. She acted in Hajar Bachhor Dhore in 2005. This film won National Film Award in five categories including Best Film. Opohoron was her last released film. Shahnoor later starred in 'Kakatadua', an official grant to a liberation war story directed by Farooq Hossain. She is currently involved in the politics of Bangladesh Awami League and she is the Film Affairs Secretary of Bangabandhu Sangskritik Jote.

== Criticism ==
Shahnoor took a stand for the government during the repression of the dictatorship Awami League government on the students in the quota reform movement that took place in 2024. During the movement, a group of pro-autocracy Awami artists, including Shahnoor, were active against the movement in a WhatsApp group called 'Alo Ashbei' led by actor Ferdous. After the non-cooperation movement, on September 3, 2024, some screenshots related to that WhatsApp group were spread on social media.

== Filmography ==
=== Films ===
Year	Title	Director	Role	Notes
	Fashir Adesh			
	Jiddi Sontan			
	Top Somrat	Montazur Rahman Akbar		
	Swapner Bashor			
2005	Hajar Bachhor Dhore	Kohinur Akter Suchanda	Ambia	
	Mayer Jonyo Juddho			
	Shesh Juddho			
	Rajdhani			
	Noyon Vora Jol			
	Prem Songhat			
	Karagar			
2003	Sahoshi Manush Chai	Mohammad Hannan		
2014	Rajababu - The Power	Badiul Alam Khokon		
	Love Station			
	Opohoron			
2019	Indu Bala	Joynal Abedin Joy Sorkar	Babla's Aunty	Release: 29 November 2019
	Hero No One			
	Ma Amar Behosto			
	Chor ow Vogoban			
	Ai Hridoy Shudu Tomar Jonno			
	Hridoy Theke Paowya			
	Shoira-Char			
	Rangga-Bai-Dhani			
	A Chokhe Shudhu Tumi			

=== Web series and drama ===
Year	Title	Director	Broadcast Channel	Notes
2021	Jamindar Bari	Sazzad Hossain Dodul	Baishakhi TV	
	‘Oiling’.	Helal Islam		Web Series

== Director ==
This is the first time in a long acting career that actress Shahnoor has started directing. In his own story, thoughts, he made the short film 'Ekti Bangladesh'. Shahnoor also starred in the production side. And his co-star is Arman Pervez Murad. The short story revolves around Bangabandhu. She is working on making a documentary about his freedom fighter father.

== Jury board ==
The OIC (Organization of Islamic Cooperation) had constituted a 3-member jury board for the final round to implement the Dhaka OIC Youth Capital Film Award 2020–2021. The board consisted of a secretary (convenor) of the Ministry of Information, a teacher at Dhaka University and actress Shahnoor of Bangladesh cinema.
