= Jannatul Ferdous Peya =

Bangladeshi model

Peya Jannatul
- জান্নাতুল ফেরদৌস পিয়া
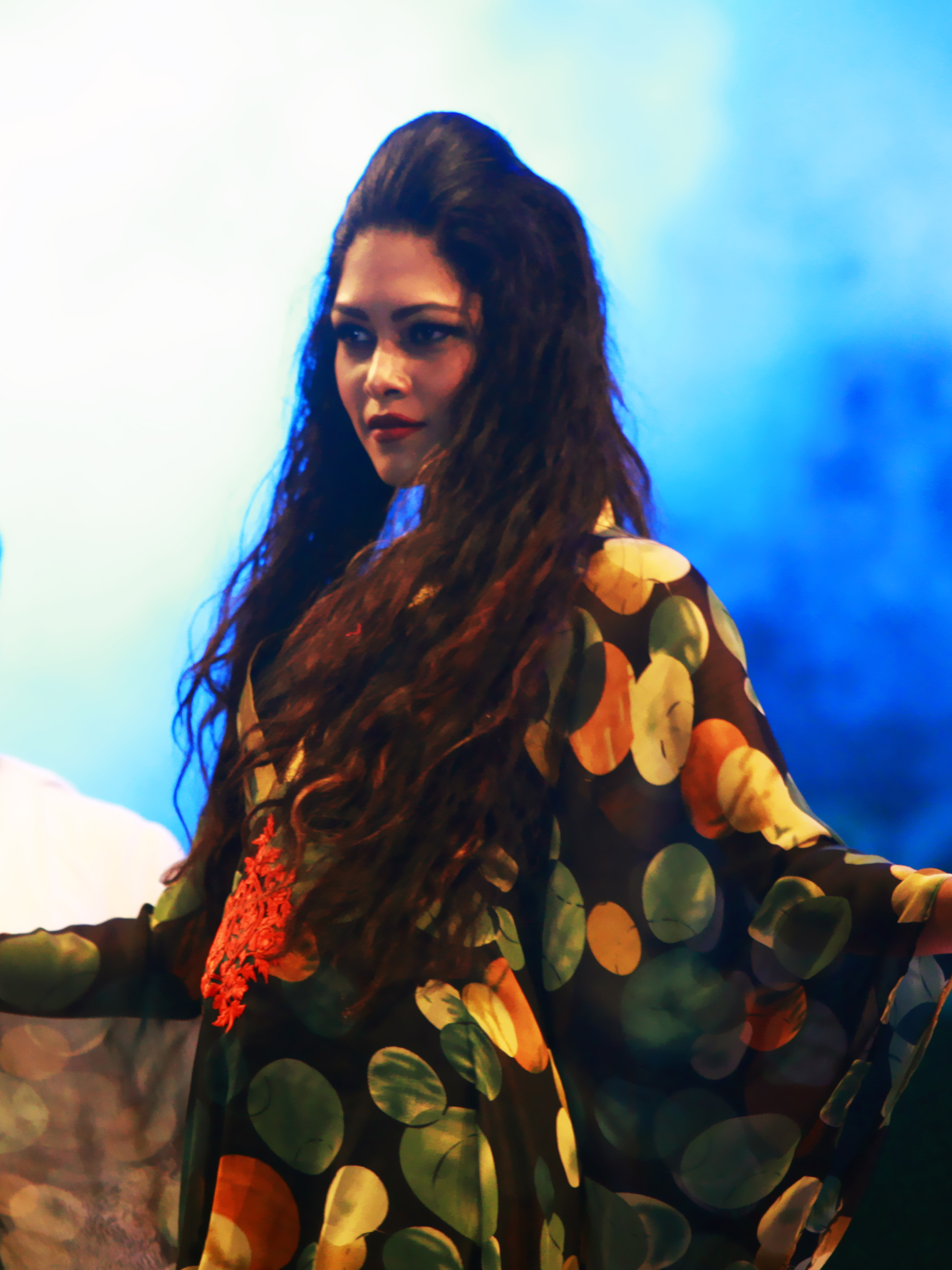
- Born: October 14, 1991 (age 34); Khulna, Bangladesh
- Education: University of London
- Occupations: Model &Lawyer
- Spouse: Faruq Hasan Samir
- Children: Ares Hasan
- Beauty pageant titleholder
- Title: Miss Bangladesh 2007 World Miss University Bangladesh 2011 Indian Princess International 2013 Top Model of the World Bangladesh 2013
- No. of films: Chorabali
- Years active: 2007–present
- Major competitions: Miss Bangladesh 2007 (Winner); Miss World 2007 (Did not compete); Indian Princess International 2013 (Winner); Top Model of the World 2013 (Top 15)
- Website: peyajannatul.com

Jannatul Ferdoush Peya, also known as Peya Jannatul, is a Bangladeshi model and lawyer. She was crowned Miss Bangladesh 2007 and Indian Princess International 2013. Peya represented Bangladesh at Top Model of The World 2013 in Egypt where she placed in the top 15.

== Career ==
Peya started her modeling career in 2008 after she had won the title of Miss Bangladesh in 2007. In 2014–15, she worked with Mascot Model Management, an modeling agency based in New Delhi. She also appeared in a music video for the Indian band Roots in 2014. In 2013 she won the crown of Miss Indian Princess International, beating contestants from 19 countries.

She has so far acted in several dramas such as To Be or Not to Be and Projapotir Shukh Dukkho.

Her first movie was Chorabali, which was directed by Redwan Rony in 2012. Her next releases were Gangster Returns and Story of Samara.

Peya is also a lawyer. As of August 15, 2022 she is an advocate at the Supreme Court of Bangladesh.

Peya is the first cover girl of Vogue India from Bangladesh. While sharing her experiences Peya stated that she finds her inspiration from Deepika Padukone and wants to expand her career internationally like Deepika.

In February 2017, Peya became the brand ambassador of TRESemmé, a high-profile hair care and styling brand which is associated with New York Fashion Week (NYFW). As such, she attended NYFW in 2017. She said that it was a great honor to be there as one of the first Bangladeshi models to attend and expressed her wish to work as a model influencer.

In September 2018, Peya became the brand ambassador of Yamaha Motorcycles Bangladesh.

Besides having a strong modeling career, she also hosted cricket matches in the 2017 season of the Bangladeshi Premier League, or BPL. She made her second appearance as host in BPL 2018 on GTV screen. After her success in hosting these two seasons of the BPL, she was invited as a presenter to work in ICC 2019 Cricket World Cup. She is the first Bangladeshi person to work as a presenter for the ICC World Cup.

== Host ==
- BPL 2018
- BPL 2019

== Book ==
Koishor Theke Zouboner Golpo, 2023

== Legal issues ==
In July 2026, a General Diary (GD) was filed at Shahbag Police Station against Peya, along with five others. The complaint, lodged by a representative of the State Dialogue Forum (SDF), alleged that the accused individuals were involved in running propaganda campaigns against the July Uprising. The accusations against Peya included allegations of ridiculing the movement on social media and providing support to political activists.

== Filmography ==
Year	Film	Role	Notes	Ref.
2012	Chorabali	Suzana	Debut film	
2015	The Story of Samara	Peya		
2015	Gangster Returns	Sheena		
2017	Prem Ki Bujhini	Meera	Indo-Bangladesh joint production film; cameo appearance	
2022	Chitmohol			
2026	Rongbazar		Released on Cinematic	
TBA	Probashir Prem	Momo	Filming	

== Awards ==
Year	Awards	Category	Film	Result
2007	Miss Bangladesh			Won
2012	Meril Prothom Alo Awards	Critics' Choice Best Film Actress	Chorabali	Nominated
2012	Bachsas Awards	Best Actress	Chorabali	Won
2012	JAY Face International			2nd
2013	Miss Indian Princess International			Won

Awards and achievements
Preceded by Tabassum Ferdous Shaon	Miss Bangladesh; 2007	Succeeded by Jannatul Nayeem Avril
