= Miss Bangladesh =

Beauty contest

- Successor: Miss World Bangladesh
- Formation: 1994
- Type: Beauty pageant
- Headquarters: Dhaka
- Location: Bangladesh
- Members: Miss World (1994-2001)
- Official language: Bangla
- Website: www.missbangladesh.com

Miss Bangladesh is the oldest national beauty pageant in Bangladesh that annually selected representatives to compete Miss World from 1994 to 2001.

== History ==
The Miss Bangladesh Contest was first organized in 1994, but the event did not attract national media attention. In 1994, Anika Taher first represented Bangladesh at the beauty pageant Miss World 1994 held in Sun City, South Africa. Shaila Simi was awarded the Miss Ruposhi Dhaka, Bangladesh award in 1998. Sonia Gazi (who was Miss Bangladesh 2000) received media attention. Bangladesh has not sent a representative to Miss World since 2001. The pageant returned briefly for one year in 2007 and was organized by Apurbo.com and sponsored by Motherland Group/Cinevision. However, the winner did not take part in Miss World. After 16 years later Antar Showbiz was created Miss World Bangladesh to give Bangladesh the opportunity to participate in the "Miss World" pageant again. Since 2024, the winner of Miss Bangladesh Beauty Pageant represents Bangladesh at Miss Earth, one of the Big Four international beauty pageants.

== Miss Bangladesh (1994-2007) ==
Color key

- Declared as Winner
- Ended as runner-up
- Ended as finalist or semifinalist.

Year	Miss Bangladesh	Placement at Miss World	Special Awards
1994	Anika Taher	Unplaced	
1995	Yasmin Bilkis Sathi	Unplaced	
1996	Rehnuma Dilruba Chitra	Unplaced	
Did not compete Miss World 1997			
1998	Shaila Simi	Did not compete	
1999	Tania Rahman Tonni	Unplaced	
2000	Sonia Gazi	Unplaced	
2001	Tabassum Ferdous Shaon	Unplaced	
2007	Jannatul Ferdous Peya	Did not compete	

== See also ==
- Miss Universe Bangladesh
- Miss World Bangladesh
- Miss Earth Bangladesh
- Miss Grand Bangladesh
