= A. K. M. Abdul Awal Majumder =

A. K. M. Abdul Awal Majumder is a retired secretary and former rector of the Bangladesh Public Administration Training Centre. He was the secretary of the Ministry of Primary and Mass Education. He was the secretary in the Ministry of Science and ICT. He is a former additional secretary of the Ministry of Education. He was the additional secretary of the Ministry of Food and Disaster Management.

== Early life ==
Majumder was born on 1 March 1957 in Basonda, Nangalkot Upazila, Comilla District, East Pakistan, Pakistan. He graduated from Batisha High School and the Comilla Victoria Government College. He completed his bachelor's and master's in political science at the University of Dhaka in 1980 and 1982, respectively. He studied at Johns Hopkins University as part of his Hubert H. Humphrey Fellowship Program.

== Career ==
Majumder joined the 1982 batch of Bangladesh Civil Service. He was trained at the Bangladesh Civil Service Administration Academy. In April 1984, he was appointed as assistant commissioner of land in Kishoreganj District. He worked in the district till 1988 reaching the rank of acting Upazila Nirbahi Officer. He was then appointed magistrate of Mymensingh Sadar Upazila. He was the Upazila Nirbahi Officer of Gouripur Upazila and Singair Upazila. He was the deputy commissioner of Faridpur District.

Majummder was the senior assistant secretary of the Ministry of Home Affairs. Then afterwards he served in the Ministry of Establishments and the Ministry of Primary and Mass Education. He was the deputy secretary of the Ministry of Health and Family Welfare and later the Cabinet Division. He served as joint secretary in the Cabinet Division and the Local Government Division, later holding the position of additional secretary in the Ministry of Agriculture.

In September 2007, Majummder was the director general of the Bangladesh Bureau of Educational Information and Statistics. He was the additional secretary of the Ministry of Disaster Management in 2008; he was previously serving in the Ministry of Education. In March 2009, he was appointed additional secretary of the Ministry of Food replacing Ahmed Hossain Khan. In August 2009, he was promoted to the rank of secretary and made an officer on special duty. He was the director general of the Bangladesh Rural Development Board and chairman of the Land Reform Board.

Majummder also served as secretary in the Ministry of Science and ICT in early 2009. He was the vice-president of the Bangladesh Scouts. He was then appointed secretary of the Ministry of Primary and Mass Education. He oversaw the recruitment of 15 thousand teachers for the Ministry of Primary and Mass Education in September 2011. He received 5,000 digital pianos from the South Korean government. In December 2014, he was appointed rector of the Bangladesh Public Administration Training Centre. He was a director of the National Academy for Planning and Development.

In 2021, Majummder said political connections were harming the chain of command of the Bangladesh Civil Service.

Following the fall of the Sheikh Hasina led Awami League government, Majummder spoke to the media about the sluggishness of the civil service and jitteriness after the fall. He called for placing experience as the paramount requirement for promotions to secretary. He supported the recommendations of the reform commissions.
