= Khandker =

Khandker is a surname and given name. Notable people with the name include:

== Given name ==
- Khandker Golam Faruq (born 1964), Bangladeshi police officer and an additional inspector general
- Khandker Nurul Habib, Bangladeshi-Canadian engineer and academic
- Khandker Md. Iftekhar Haider, Bangladeshi university chancellor
- Khandker Anwarul Islam (born 1960), Bangladeshi civil servant

== Surname ==
- Abdul Karim Khandker (1930–2025), Bangladeshi air officer and politician
- Hamidul Haque Khandker (born 1955), Bangladeshi politician
- Hassan Mahmood Khandker, Bangladeshi police Inspector General
- Tushar Khandker (born 1985), Indian field hockey player

== See also ==
- BAF Base Bir Uttom A. K. Khandker, Bangladeshi Air Force base
