= Md. Mokhlesur Rahman (government official) =

Bangladeshi civil servant

Mohammad Mokhlesur Rahman
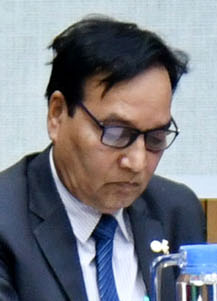
- Mokhlesur Rahman in 2025

Senior Secretary Ministry of Public Administration
- In office 28 August 2024 – 21 September 2025
- Preceded by: Mohammad Mezbah Uddin Chowdhury
- Succeeded by: Mohammad Ruhul Amin

Personal details
- Born: Rangpur
- Education: Rangpur Zilla School; University of Dhaka; Australian National University; Harvard University

Mohammad Mokhlesur Rahman is a Bangladeshi civil servant. He was previously senior secretary of the Ministry of Public Administration. He is also the chairman of the state-run Jiban Bima Corporation and a member of the Public Administration Reform Commission.

== Biography ==
Rahman graduated from Harvard University.

In 1982, he joined the special batch of the Bangladesh Civil Service.

During his career, Rahman served in posts including the deputy commissioner of Moulvibazar District, the divisional commissioner of Chattogram Division, secretary to the Anti-Corruption Commission, and secretary to Bangladesh Public Service Commission.

Despite having retired from civil service, Rahman was appointed senior secretary of the Ministry of Public Administration after the fall of the Sheikh Hasina-led Awami League government. He replaced Mohammad Mezbah Uddin Chowdhury who was made an officer on special duty. He was appointed for a two-year term. He visited the grave of Abu Sayeed who was killed in the uprising against Sheikh Hasina and donated 100 thousand to his family. He was accompanied by Rezaul Maqsud Zahedi, Secretary of the Ministry of Youth and Sports, and Md Azmal Hossain, Rangpur Divisional Commissioner.

In October 2024, Rahman was appointed chairman of the Jiban Bima Corporation replacing senior secretary Asadul Islam. The same month, he was accused of accepting a payment of 30 million taka in exchange for deputy commissioner appointments, allegations which he denied. Government Chief Advisor Muhammad Yunus ordered an investigation of the allegations against Rahman.

In September 2025, Rahman was removed from his post at the Ministry of Public Administration, replaced by Md Ruhul Amin. Rahman was transferred to a post at the Planning Commission.
