= Md. Mokammel Hossain =

Md. Mokammel Hossain is a Bangladeshi civil servant and secretary of the Ministry of Civil Aviation and Tourism. The national airlines, Bangladesh Biman Airlines, is under the Ministry of Civil Aviation and Tourism.

== Early life ==
Hossain was born on 1 January 1964. He completed his undergrad and master's in economics from the University of Dhaka.

== Career ==
In 1991, Hossain joined the administration cadre of the Bangladesh Civil Service. He was appointed to the Khulna deputy commissioner as an assistant commissioner.

Hossain served in the Secretariat of the Bangladesh Public Service Commission and Bangladesh Civil Service Administration Academy.

Hossain was the private secretary of the principal secretary to Prime Minister Sheikh Hasina. He was the counselor of labour at the Consulate General of Bangladesh, Jeddah, Saudi Arabia. Hossain was the additional secretary of sustainable development goals affairs in the Prime Minister's Office. He was part of a delegation led by Shamsul Alam to Dehradun, Uttarakhand to learn about Sustainable Development Goals implementation.

Hossain was appointed the secretary of the Ministry of Civil Aviation and Tourism on 24 December 2020 replacing Md. Mohibul Haque. He was serving as the additional secretary of the Ministry of Public Administration. He visited the mausoleum of Sheikh Mujibur Rahman in Tungipara, Gopalganj District.

In September 2023, Hossain organized the first Bangladesh Festival at the Bangabandhu International Conference Centre. He is the chairman of Hotels International Limited. He oversaw the launch of the third terminal of Hazrat Shahjalal International Airport. He saw the signing of an agreement to purchase radar for the airport from Thales Group. He saw the start of flights from Dhaka to Guangzhou Baiyun International Airport.

== Personal life ==
Hossain is married to Asia Khatun, commissioner of the Anti-Corruption Commission.
