= K M Ali Azam =

Bangladeshi politician

Member Bangladesh Public Service Commission
- Incumbent
- Assumed office 4 November 2022
- Appointed by: President of Bangladesh
- President: Abdul Hamid; Mohammed Shahabuddin

Senior Secretary Ministry of Public Administration
- In office 27 May 2021 – 1 November 2022
- Prime Minister: Sheikh Hasina
- Succeeded by: Mohammad Mezbah Uddin Chowdhury

Personal details
- Born: 31 October 1963 (age 62) Mollahat Upazila, Bagerhat District, Bangladesh
- Education: University of Dhaka

K M Ali Azam is a retired Bangladeshi government official who is a current member of the Bangladesh Public Service Commission. Prior to this, he served as the senior secretary of the Ministry of Public Administration. He is the former secretary of the Ministry of Industries and a director of British American Tobacco Bangladesh.

== Early life ==
Azam was born in 1953 into an aristocratic Bengali Muslim family in Udaipur village, Mollahat Upazila, Bagerhat District, East Pakistan, Pakistan. His father was K M Mahbubur Rahman. He completed his master's degree in economics from the University of Rajshahi.

== Career ==
Azam joined the Bangladesh Civil Service on 20 December 1989 as part of the administration cadre in the 86 batch.

Azam had served as the assistant commissioner in the Office of the Deputy Commissioner of Chittagong District. He was the assistant commissioner of land in Meherpur Sadar Upazila. He was the upazila nirbahi officer of Satkhira Sadar Upazila in 2004. He was the deputy commissioner and district magistrate of Chapai Nawabganj District in 2010. He served as the deputy secretary in the Ministry of Public Administration and the joint secretary in the Ministry of Home Affairs. He was the director general of the Prime Minister's Office under Prime Minister Sheikh Hasina and project director of a2i Programme.

Azam has also served as the divisional commissioner of Dhaka Division. He served as the returning officer for the 11th Jatiya Sangsad in the Dhaka City Corporation area in 2018. In 2020, Azam was the secretary at the Ministry of Labour and Employment.

Azam was appointed the secretary in the Ministry of Industries on 27 May 2020 replacing Md Abdul Halim. On 21 June 2020, Azam was appointed a non-executive director of British American Tobacco Bangladesh. On 23 March 2021, Azam was the special guest in the United Nations Capital Development Fund's program titled "Leaving No Micro Merchants Behind in the Digital Era in Bangladesh".

On 10 May 2021, Azam was appointed the senior secretary of the Ministry of Public Administration. He was a syndicate member of Khulna University of Engineering and Technology in 2021. He was a director of the Bangladesh Public Administration Training Centre.
