= Asia Khatun =

Commissioner Anti Corruption Commission
- In office 2 July 2023 – 29 October 2024
- Appointed by: President of Bangladesh
- President: Mohammed Shahabuddin
- Preceded by: Md Mozammel Haque Khan

Personal details
- Born: 2 January 1963 (age 63) Chuadanga District, Bangladesh
- Spouse: Md. Mokammel Hossain
- Children: 1
- Education: University of Rajshahi; National University of Singapore
- Profession: Government official, former Secretary

Asia Khatun, also known as Mosammat Asia Khatun, is a retired secretary and served as the commissioner of the Anti-Corruption Commission. She is the first woman to be appointed commissioner of the Anti-Corruption Commission.

== Early life ==
Khatun was born in 1963 in Darshana, Chuadanga District, East Pakistan, Pakistan. She graduated from the University of Rajshahi in accounting. She did her master's degree at the International Institute of Social Studies in Women and Gender Studies. She did a master's degree in Public Policy at the National University of Singapore. She did an MBA from the Nanyang Technological University.

== Career ==
On 26 January 1991, Khatun joined the administration cadre of the Bangladesh Civil Service.

Khatun was the assistant commissioner of Noakhali District. She was the executive magistrate of Khulna District. She served as a counselor at the Bangladesh consulate in Jeddah.

Khatun was the Senior Assistant Secretary of the Ministry of Primary and Mass Education, Ministry of Public Administration, and the Ministry of Land. She was a director of the National Academy for Planning and Development. She served at the Bangladesh Civil Service Administration Academy as the member directing staff. She was the secretary of the Bangladesh Public Service Commission secretariat.

Khatun retired as a secretary on 3 January 2022.

In June 2023, Khatun was appointed Commissioner in charge of investigations of the Anti-Corruption Commission with the rank of the High Court Division judge. She joined under chairman of the commission, Mohammad Moin Uddin Abdullah, and replaced Mozammel Haque Khan. She met President Mohammed Shahabuddin after her appointment and sought his guidance as he was a former Commissioner of the Anti-Corruption Commission.

== Personal life ==
Khatun is married to Md. Mokammel Hossain, secretary of the Ministry of Civil Aviation and Tourism.
