= M. Aslam Alam =

M. Aslam Alam is a retired Bangladeshi civil servant and chairman of the Insurance Development and Regulatory Authority of Bangladesh. He is the former rector of the Bangladesh Public Administration Training Centre. He was the secretary of the Bank and Financial Institutions Division.

== Early life ==
Alam did his bachelor's and master's in accounting at the University of Dhaka. He did another master's in international relations at the International University of Japan. He did his PhD at the University of New South Wales in sociology.

== Career ==
In October 2012, Alam was appointed secretary of the Financial Institutions Division replacing Md. Shafiqur Rahman Patwary. He was the secretary of the Ministry of Disaster Management and Relief. He dissolved the board of directors of BASIC Bank Limited over loan and financial irregularities. He attended the plenary session of the Financial Action Task Force in Paris. He was removed from his post and made an officer on special duty following the Bangladesh Bank hacking in an attempt to steal one billion USD. The Federal Bureau of Investigation suspected it was the North Korean government.

Alam served from 4 May 2017 to 28 July 2019 as the rector of the Bangladesh Public Administration Training Centre. He had served as the Director General of the Prime Minister's Office.

Alam was the chairman of the Bangladesh Institute for Information Literacy and Sustainable Development.

Alam was appointed chairman of the Insurance Development and Regulatory Authority of Bangladesh on 9 September 2024 following the resignation of Mohammad Jainul Bari.

In July 2025, Alam's allotment of a flat in the Dhanmondi Housing Project was cancelled by the government of Bangladesh. After the fall of the Sheikh Hasina led Awami League government, a murder case was filed against him by Bangladesh Nationalist Party politician Mohammad Zaman Hossain Khan over the death of a protestor in July 2024.

== Bibliography ==
- Insights from Developing Countries (Routledge, 2020), coedited with Dilara Begum, and Fakrul Alam.
