= Dilkusha =

Dilkusha may refer to:

- Dilkusha, Dhaka, a former royal garden palace and present-day a commercial area in Dhaka, Bangladesh
- Dilkusha, Lucknow, a locality in Lucknow, Uttar Pradesh, India
- Dilkusha Bagh, a historic garden in Lahore, Pakistan
- Dilkusha Bhulbhulaiya Garden Tower, a maze-like garden tower in Dhaka, Bangladesh
- Dilkusha Kothi, an 18th-century historic house in Lucknow, India
- Dilkusha Guest House, a government guest house in Hyderabad, India
- Dilkusha SC, a football club based in Dhaka, Bangladesh
