= Md Mozammel Haque Khan =

Bangladeshi civil servant

Mozammel Haque Khan

Commissioner Anti-Corruption Commission
- In office 2 July 2018 – 2 July 2023
- Appointed by: President of Bangladesh
- President: Mohammed Shahabuddin
- Preceded by: Dr. Nasiruddin Ahmed
- Succeeded by: Asia Khatun

Senior Secretary Ministry of Public Administration
- In office 6 December 2016 – 30 June 2018
- Prime Minister: Sheikh Hasina
- Preceded by: Dr. Kamal Abdul Naser Chowdhury
- Succeeded by: Faiz Ahmed

Roads Division

Senior Secretary
- In office 8 June 2011 – 16 November 2011
- Minister: Syed Abul Hossain; Obaidul Quader
- Preceded by: position created
- Succeeded by: M.A.N. Siddique

Ministry of Communication

Senior Secretary
- In office 2 September 2009 – 8 June 2011
- Minister: Syed Abul Hossain
- Preceded by: A.S.M. Ali Kabir
- Succeeded by: position abolished

Personal details
- Born: 1 November 1959 (age 66) Faridpur District, East Pakistan, Pakistan
- Education: Dhaka College; University of Dhaka
- Profession: Government service

Dr. Md Mozammel Haque is the former commissioner of the Anti-Corruption Commission and former senior secretary . He is the former president of both the Bangladesh Scouts and the Bangladesh Karate Federation. Currently he is the chairman of Wazeda Kuddus Khan Welfare Foundation .

== Early life ==
Khan was born on 3 November 1959 in Faridpur District, East Pakistan, Pakistan (present-day Panchkhola Union, Madaripur District, Bangladesh). In 1974 and 1976, Khan graduated from United Islamia Government High School and Dhaka College. He completed his bachelor's degree and master's from University of Dhaka in social sciences. He completed his Doctor of Science from Cairo Demographic Center. He completed his Ph.D. in public administration.

== Career ==
Khan joined the Bangladesh Civil Service in 1982 as an administration cadre. In 2001, Khan was a director at the Prime Minister's Office. He was the deputy commissioner and district magistrate of Jhenaidah District. Khan served as personal secretary to President Iajuddin Ahmed in 2007. In 2008, Khan was the additional secretary at the Ministry of Education.

In 2009, Khan was promoted to secretary of Ministry of Chittagong Hill Tracts Affairs. He went on to work at the Ministry of Communication, Implementation Monitoring and Evaluation Division, Planning Ministry, and Energy and Mineral Resources Division. He was also the secretary of the Roads and Railway Division. In 2014, Khan was promoted to senior secretary at the Ministry of Home Affairs. He is a former director of Bangladesh Securities and Exchange Commission. In 2016, Khan was appointed senior secretary at the Ministry of Public Administration. He replaced Kamal Abdul Naser Chowdhury.

Khan was made a commissioner of the Anti-Corruption Commission in July 2018 replacing Dr. Nasiruddin Ahmed.

On 11 June 2023, Khan was replaced by Mst. Asia Khatun, former secretary of Bangladesh Public Service Commission.

In July 2025, Khan's allotment of a flat in the Construction of Residential Flats on Abandoned Houses in Dhanmondi and Mohammadpur Areas (Dhanmondi Housing Project) was cancelled by the government of Bangladesh.

After the fall of the Sheikh Hasina led Awami League government, a murder case was filed against Khan by Bangladesh Nationalist Party politician Mohammad Zaman Hossain Khan over the death of a protestor in July 2024.

== Scouting ==
Khan was awarded the second highest award of Bangladesh Scouts 'Silver Hilsa' in 2004 and the highest award of Bangladesh Scouts 'Silver Tiger' in 2008 for his role and special contribution in scouting activities. He also received The Bharat Scouts and Guides' highest award 'Silver Elephant' and Philippine Scouts' 'Bronze Tamaru' award in 2015. Currently, He is serving as the president of Bangladesh Scouts.
