= Pan Pacific Sonargaon =

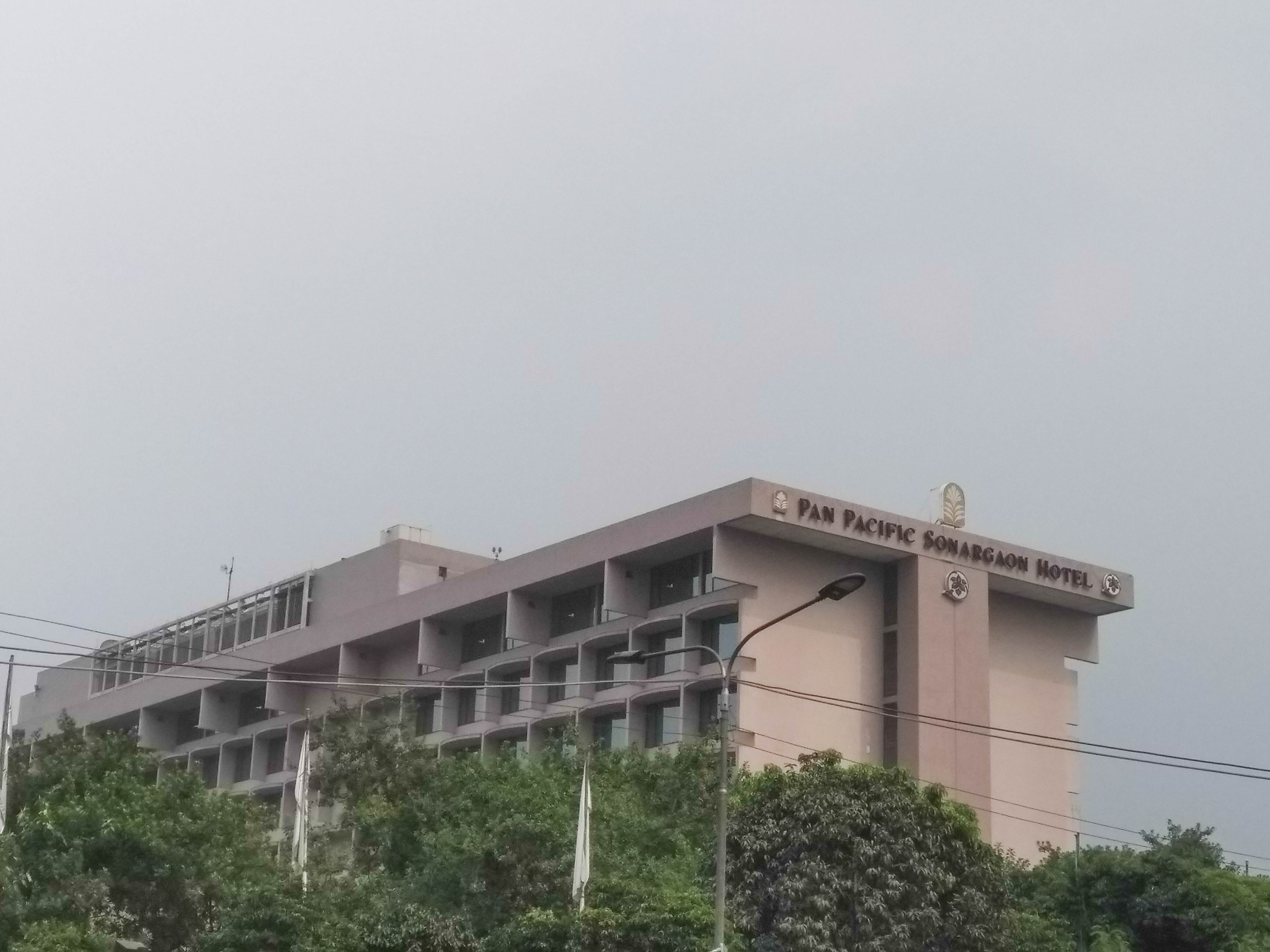
- Interactive map of the Pan Pacific Sonargaon area

General information
- Status: Operating
- Type: Hotel
- Location: 107 Kazi Nazrul Islam Avenue, Kawran Bazar, Dhaka, Bangladesh
- Coordinates: 23.7496°N 90.3941°E
- Opening: 1981
- Owner: Government

Other information
- Public transit access: MRT Line 6 Karwan Bazar , Dhaka

Website
- www.panpacific.com/en/hotels-and-resorts/pp-dhaka.html

The Pan Pacific Sonargaon is a hotel in Dhaka. It is one of the oldest 5 star hotel in Bangladesh and is owned by the government of Bangladesh and operated by Pan Pacific Hotels and Resorts.

== History ==
Hotels International Limited was established on 25 June 1977 as a public limited company to establish a five star hotel in Dhaka. The foundation of Pan Pacific Sonargaon was laid on 17 October 1977. The construction was financed by Overseas Economic Cooperation Fund (later renamed to Japan Bank for International Cooperation) as a loan to the government of Bangladesh.

Pan Pacific Sonargaon was established in 1981. The hotel was designed by Hawaii-based architect Peter Hsi. Pan Pacific Hotels and Resorts was hired to manage the hotel as Bangladesh lacked the necessary experience of operating a 5-star hotel. An 8-acre site in Karwan Bazar was chosen as the construction site.

On 13 October 2003, Hotel International Limited announced plans to spend one billion taka to renovate the hotel. On 19 March 2004, Pan Pacific Sonargaon launched the Global Hotel Alliance in Dhaka.

On 30 August 2006, the Secretary of the Ministry of Tourism and Civil Aviation, Shahid Alam, asked the Chairman of RAJUK, KAM Harun, to not fine Hotel International Limited for the unapproved expansion of Pan Pacific Sonargaon. The hotel had ignored two notices from RAJUK over its construction in Begunbari Canal. There was whistleblower complaints against Southeast Asia Technology Co Ltd, a consultant of the renovation project, from hotel employees.

Renovation works in the hotel began in 2007 by Accom Engineering Ltd, a sister concern of Orion Group. It was stalled due to the 2007-2008 caretaker government political crises in Bangladesh and corruption allegations. The renovation works were completed by the mid 2017. Orion Group got the 1.8 billion taka renovation project through close connections with Hawa Bhaban according to hotel officials as reported by The Daily Star. The renovations, which started in 2005, where near completion in 2008. A new health club and pool was opened at the hotel in July following the renovation.

== Board of directors ==
Name	Designation	Profession	Reference
Md. Mokammel Hossain	Chairman	Civil Servant	
Abu Hena Md. Rahmatul Muneem	Director	Civil Servant	
Masud Bin Momen	Director	Civil Servant	
M. Tofazzel Hossain Miah	Director	Civil Servant	
Fatima Yasmin	Director	Civil Servant	
Abul Kalam Mohammad Ziaur Rahman	Director	Military Officer & Executive Chairman of the BEPZA	
Md. Ali Kadar	Director	Chairman of the Bangladesh Parjatan Corporation	
Md. Aminur Rahaman	Managing Director	Civil Servant	
Md. Jashim Uddin	Director	President of Federation of Bangladesh Chambers of Commerce & Industries	
H. M. Hakim Ali	Director	President of the International Hotel Association of Bangladesh	
