= Khuda Buksh =

Bangladeshi businessman and humanitarian

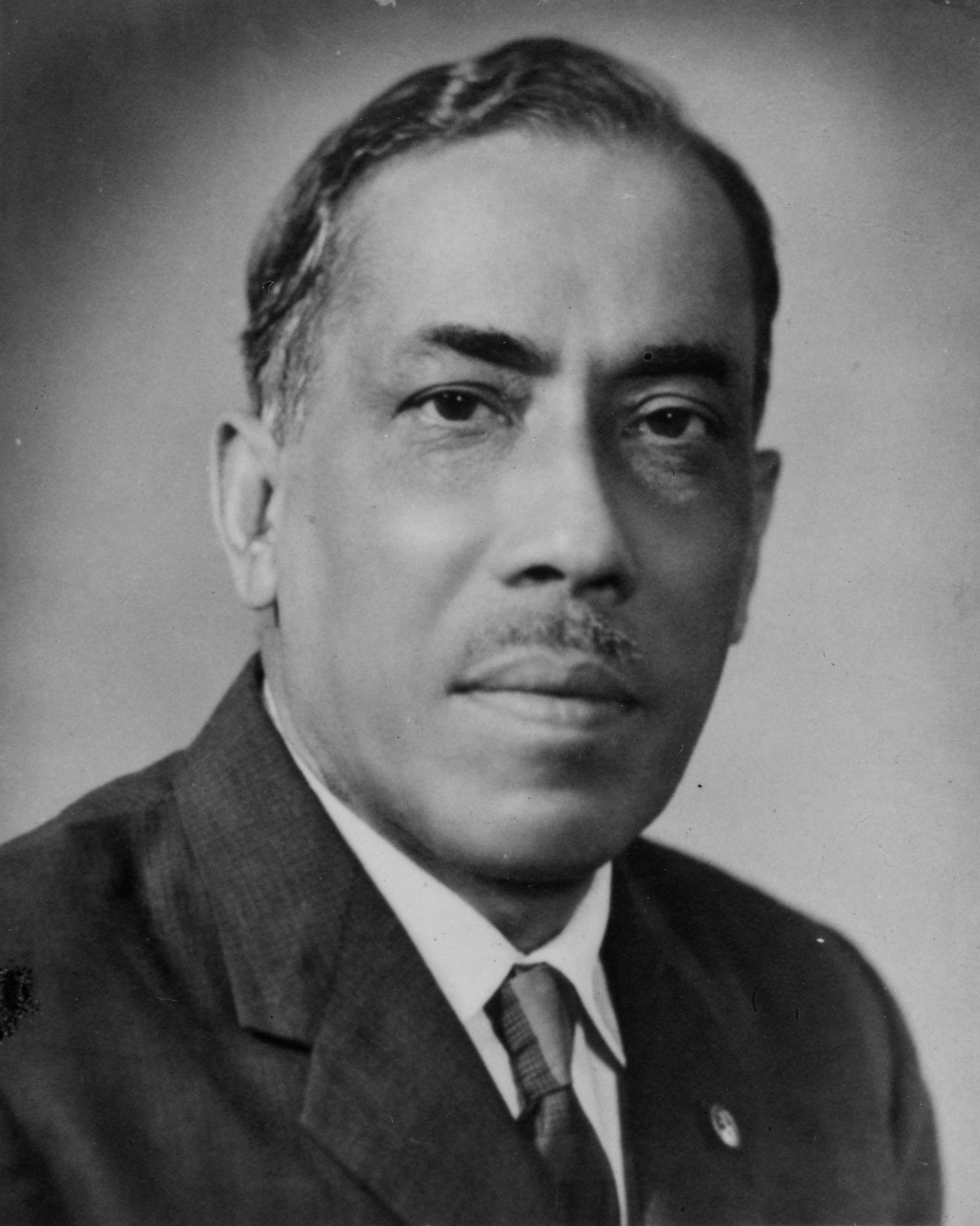
- "Keep your watchful eyes ever vigilant so that no breadwinner of your areas of activities dies leaving his family uncared for . . . Attain belief in the job. Have conviction that life assurance is the most noble profession." – Khuda Buksh, Your Duty is Onerous, Symposium on Life Insurance in Pakistan (July 1967)
- Born: 1 February 1912; Damodya, Shariatpur, British India
- Died: 13 May 1974 (aged 62); Dacca, Bangladesh
- Education: Educated at Presidency College, Kolkata, India.
- Occupation: Insurance Salesman
- Notable work: Life insurance business development in Indian subcontinent

Khuda Buksh (1 February 1912 – 13 May 1974) was a Bengali life insurance salesman and humanitarian from the Indian subcontinent. For four decades he represented the "life and soul of the insurance industry" throughout the region, leaving a mark on the business in three separate countries: British India (specifically in East India), Pakistan, and Bangladesh. Buksh, or "Insurance Giant," as he became known, gained fame in the 1940s for his salesmanship in East India. From the 1950s to 1960s, he helped build one of Pakistan's top insurance companies from scratch. He was the pioneer of life insurance industry growth and development in Bangladesh; his name became "synonymous with the life insurance industry," and he is even referred to, in Bangladesh, as the "Father of Insurance."

== Early life and education (1912–1935) ==
Buksh was born in Damodya, a remote village in the Shariatpur District of East Bengal in British India. He was the oldest of six children born to Shonabuddin Hawladar and Arjuta Khatun. As a child, Buksh was known to be friendly, respectful, religious, generous, kind-hearted, and ethical. Being affected by the poverty and destitution he witnessed in his village, Buksh tried to help those who were less fortunate than he was. In grade school, he repurchased the same math textbook for class to give it to classmates who could not afford their own books. He was recognized as a talented student and obtained scholarships at all levels of schooling. He stood first in his class from primary to middle school and in high school he stood first or second. He was the captain of his football team playing the center-forward position. His team was successful, competing outside of its sub-division and winning many trophies. Additionally, Buksh possessed an ingenious mind and exceptional interpersonal skills.

Buksh passed the entrance examination from the Symacharan Edward Institution in 1929 in Koneshar, a village near Damodya, in the first division, with a distinction in mathematics. He then went to Kolkata and studied at Maulana Azad College, for two years and passed the intermediate (equivalent to Junior college)examination in 1932. Later he studied at the Presidency College at Kolkata for two years, working towards his bachelor's degree. Throughout college, he boarded with the family of Habibur Rahman, a captain of a commercial ocean liner, who was often away from home. Along with his studies, Buksh looked after Rahman's household affairs and his bedridden wife and two school-going children just like a guardian for the family. However, due to health and familial complications, he was unable to complete the degree. Subsequently, Buksh accepted a part-time job as a librarian at the college.

== Early professional life, Calcutta, British India (1935–1952) ==
OGSLAC Management
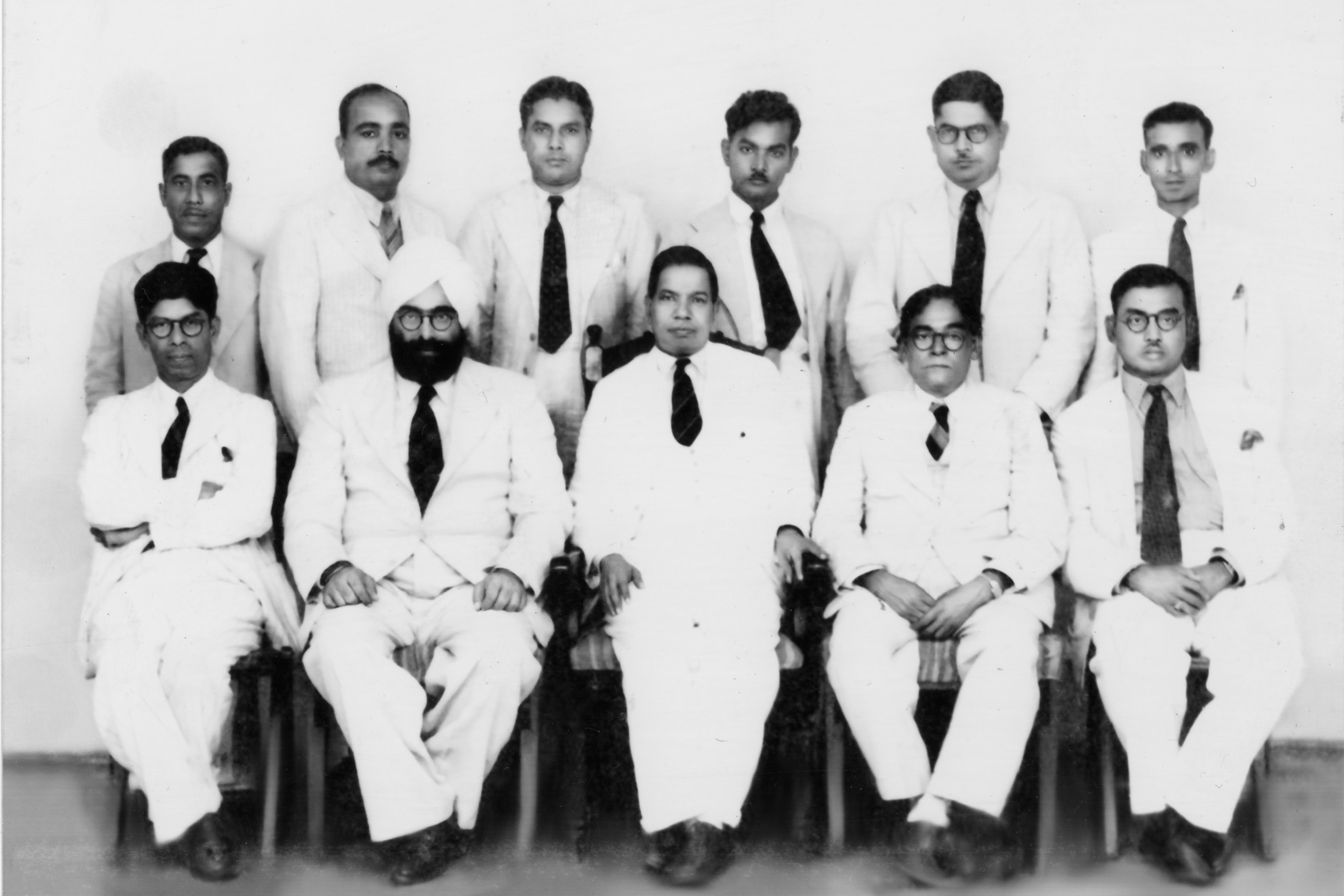
- A Group photo of OGSLA's management, Khuda Buksh (standing left), D.K. Dastur, managing director (sitting center), Calcutta, India, 1946.

Buksh joined the Oriental Government Security Life Assurance Company (OGSLAC) in Calcutta on 2 December 1935, assuming a clerical position. Atahar Ali, an insurance man recognized Buksh's "highly developed sense of persuasive power" motivated him to pursue life insurance selling career. Desiring to serve humanity, he immediately dedicated himself to becoming a full-time life insurance agent. He was the first among the Muslims to join the OGSLAC field force. In Hindu dominated Calcutta, there were only a handful of Bengali Muslims rich enough to buy an insurance policy and Islamic fundamentalism discouraged insurance as un-Islamic. Religious minded-people believed that the idea that one could reduce risks in life and business through insurance went against the sovereignty of God. The dominating view at the time was that only worthless people worked for insurance companies, and insurance agents were not welcomed into people's homes. He soon realized how ordinary people's ignorance of good financial systems deprived them of tremendous benefits; he realized that this ignorance was due, in great part, to the poor strategies being used to present the benefits of insurance to the masses. "People generally had no respect for insurance salesmanship, [and] the profession was very much looked down upon," he said. Buksh, endowed with a natural "persuasive power," vowed to change this perception. He applied his "challenging mentality" and "indomitable spirit" to selling life insurance policies door-to-door. This became his life's mission. He carried a light folding chair with him on his rounds and, if a client did not offer him a seat, he would use his folding chair. He preached the message of life insurance to every home, promoting the idea that life insurance is an indispensable part of everyday lives. He was enthusiastic and confident, and he held his hopes high and was determined to succeed. His charm, passion for understanding people, and business savvy helped to win the hearts of Muslims and Hindus. He established himself as reputable insurance salesman and "made a name for himself as a first class insurer." In 1946, the OGSLAC promoted him to inspector. After gaining 17 years of field experience, Buksh moved back to his homeland, East Bengal, to take on a prestigious position at the Eastern Federal Union Insurance Company Limited (EFU).

== Life insurance leader, East Pakistan (1952–1968) ==
EFU Personnel
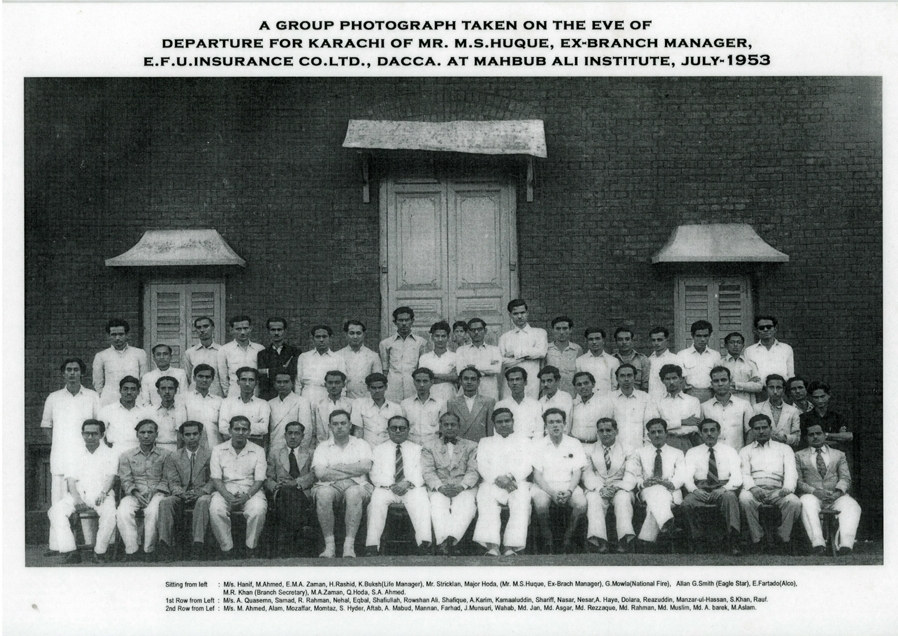
- A Group photo of EFU personnel (managers, officers, agents and staff) and guests from other insurance companies, Dacca, East Pakistan, July 1953.

At the EFU, located at Dacca, Buksh became the life manager in charge of East Pakistan in July 1952. At the time, there was widespread fundamentalist propaganda against insurance, which portrayed it as being un-Islamic. The general public, from solvent businessmen to the lower-middle class, also believed insurance to be associated with death. Moreover, the educated were reluctant to join the insurance profession due to the negative religious and culturally prejudiced views against life insurance workers. Buksh made his life's goal to not only change preconceived ideas about insurance, but to create and sustain a positive image of insurance workers and the services they offered. He again took advantage of his "magnetic personality," and "exemplary integrity" recruited, motivated, and trained hundreds of young people every year in the insurance business, particularly a "huge section of the unemployed, ambition-less" young people. During this period, he helped provide jobs to the children of numerous poverty stricken Bengali Muslim families. In order to develop a salesman's confidence, improve sales talks, and build enthusiasm for the job, he freely shared his practical knowledge and field experience gained over many years and imparted to the newly recruited agents for their training. He gave them an objective analysis of the career:

Keep your watchful eyes ever vigilant so that no breadwinner of your area of activities dies leaving his family uncared for. Fight out like Hercules the colossus of un-certainty, unrest, of hard times by offering life assurance protection. Attain belief in the job. Have firm conviction that life assurance is the most noble profession. Have faith that intelligent and honest endeavor never goes unrewarded. You must develop determination and enthusiasm . . . Make contact with as many people as you can. Spend the major portion of your time in presence of your prospects, act courteously, be tactful in presentation and you will find that it is easier to get than to miss business.

While working to employ them, he also developed the kind of positive competition that would challenge employees to excel at work and in social interactions. He excelled at turning novice trainees into efficient insurance agents. He visited every agent's home and inspired them with his enthusiasm, motivational words, and kindness. He also offered to mitigate their financial and personal problems. He often helped them with his "extra-ordinary convincing capability" to secure business by accompanying them to meet with prospective clients. At the same time, he continued to forge close connections with professional, social, cultural, and education organizations, such as Rotary Club of Rotary International, to increase awareness of life insurance in the greater society. "He devised inventive techniques and motivated his sales force to challenge the public's negative perception of life insurance."

Initially, the insurance policies were issued from the head office in Karachi, with clients in Dacca, Chittagong and other places. This caused unusually long delays and to avoid these, Buksh convinced management to have policy renewals, premiums and other arrangements done from Dacca. He increased manpower in Dacca regional office and other divisional and sub-divisional towns. Thus a new class of insurance workers were created and the insurance business grew in East Pakistan because of his "extra-ordinary foresight."

A "workaholic," Buksh created a large number of field organizations, built a strong force across East Pakistan and became a "champion in the life insurance business." Nevertheless, he fiercely protected the interests of insured people and settled life insurance claims without delay. He would sometimes attend the funeral services of an insured person, hand-delivering an insurance benefit check to the surviving family members in order to raise their morale. Under Buksh's leadership the company business showed an upward trend with a paid-for business from Rs. 25.4 million in 1953 to Rs. 42.8 million in 1957. By March 1958, the EFU proudly announced in a newspaper that "Eastern Federal was the largest Pakistani Insurance Company." The EFU and Buksh became a household name and under his leadership, in 1959, East Pakistan accounted for 65 percent of the EFU's life insurance business. In 1960, Buksh was promoted to the position of life manager of East and West Pakistan and moved to the company's head office in Karachi, West Pakistan.

== Life insurance leader, Pakistan (1960–1968) ==
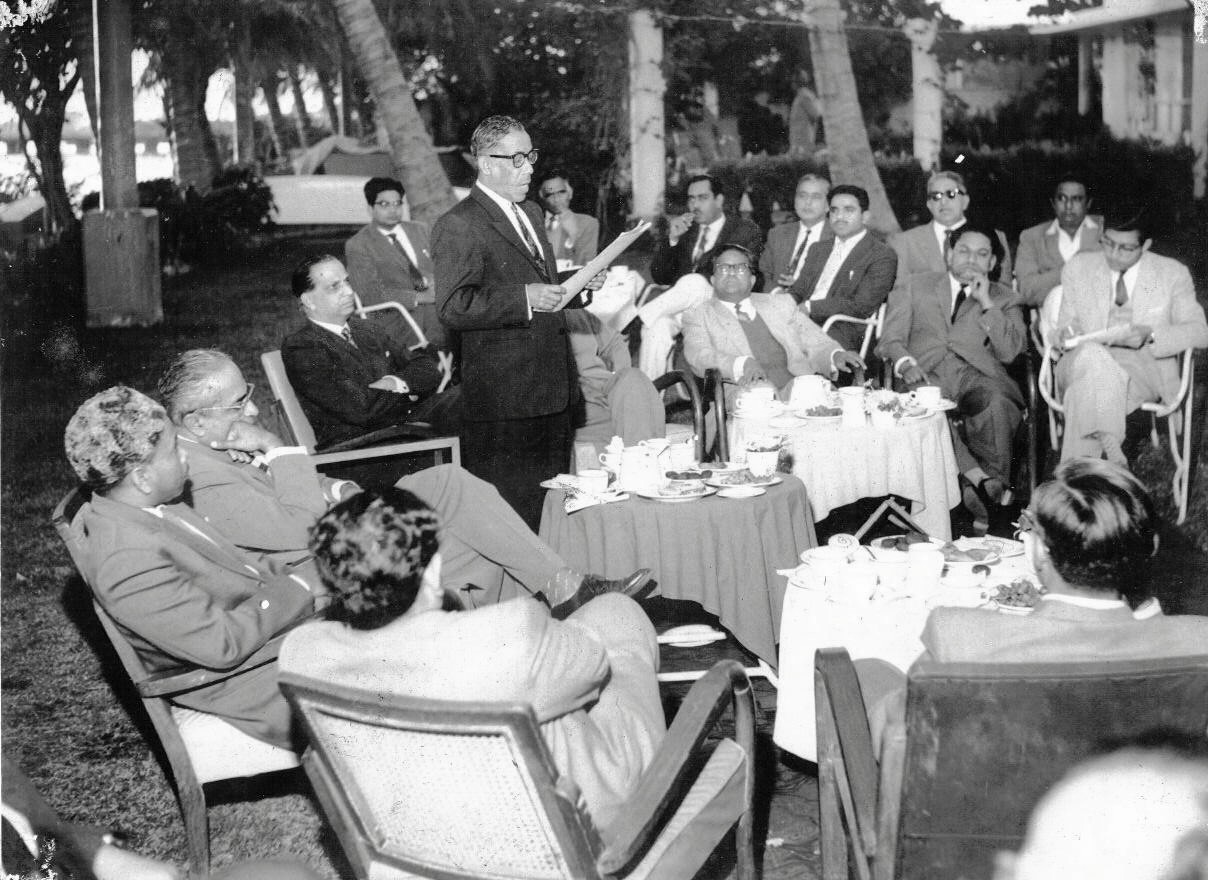
Khuda Buksh announcing the target completion of 1962 to the EFU management at the lawns of Beach Luxury Hotel, Clifton, Karachi, West Pakistan, January 1963

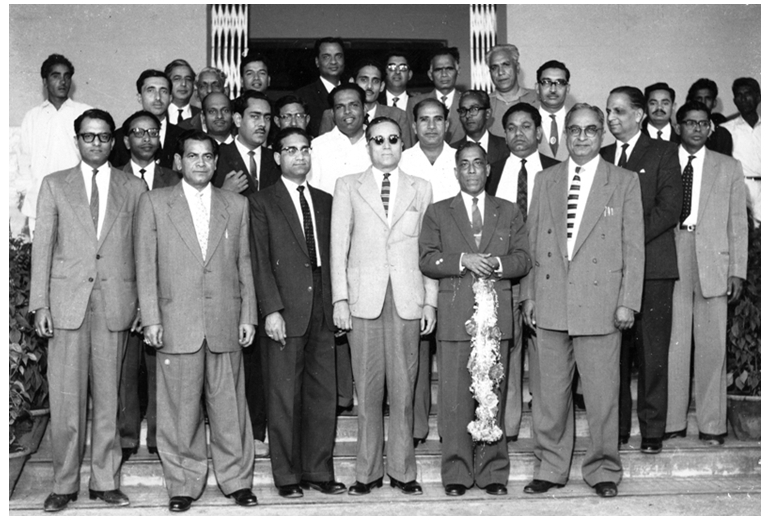
Khuda Buksh being greeted at Karachi Airport by EFU Management 1965

A "dynamic leader" with a "charismatic personality," Buksh planned and sought to do in the entire country what he had done in East Pakistan. His strategy was to bring more people into the life insurance business and expand business across both parts of the country. Buksh had a unique capability to recognize a promising salesman. His persuasive skills enabled him to convince many key producers from various other companies to join the EFU. He personally hired all administrative and key marketing people including development officers, inspectors and managers for the company. Through "deliberate actions," Buksh developed a highly motivated and dedicated sales force. He created, organized, and managed four zones: Central Zone (Karachi, head office), Western Zone (Lahore, regional headquarters), Rawalpindi Zone (Rawalpindi), and Eastern Zone (Dacca, regional headquarters).

Buksh frequently travelled to all the EFU zones to attend meetings, conferences and prize distribution ceremonies. He had an excellent style of speaking, and a surprising technique to win others' hearts. "His mode of speaking was polished, everyone listened with a pin-drop silence." He mostly delivered extempore speeches and "inspired his agents through fascinating speech to bring in more business, more successes," said Mujibur Rahman. While in the office in Karachi, Lahore, Dacca, Chittagong or Rawalpindi he kept in touch with his field force in all zones on a daily basis through telephone calls, and he was aware of what was going on, what each field officer was doing, and what their achievements were, regardless of whether they were was an agent, a sales manager or a chief manager. He applied his personal touch in his dealings with his field force and this "made a significant difference in the enthusiasm of both field and office staff." Buksh worked hard himself and could get the work done. He was instrumental in setting sales targets and ensuring that the large team he developed reached their goals. According to Rizwan Ahmed Farid, Buksh had the respect, love, and trust of his coworkers:

He gained the confidence and credentials of his teammates by being honest, down-to-earth, humble, sincere, fair and straight forward, with himself as well as with his subordinates. He built up their trust by empowering people by delegating them the authority for important managerial decisions. He made sure to honor any commitment made by his teammates—thus developing their confidence.

Despite his busy schedule, Buksh maintained an open door policy. Anyone could walk into his office and freely discuss about various problems. From 1962 to 1965, under Abbas Khaleeli's leadership at the EFU's life department, Buksh sold more policies than all four foreign insurers in Pakistan. Due in large part to Buksh's efforts, the total market share of in-force policies for foreign insurers at the end of 1965 was less than that of Eastern Federal. From 1963 to 1966, EFU management introduced two training schemes at Karachi. One was an executive officer's training scheme and the other was a three-month officer's training scheme. The trainees were exposed to Buksh's style of speaking and motivation. Buksh was instrumental in making [each] scheme a success on the practical side.

By 1966, the company had 600 organization officers and 11,000 agents, about 50 percent of whom belonged to the Eastern Zone. His value being measured by the amount of business he produced, Buksh secured so many clients that the company was able to "advertise that every second person having life insurance policy in the country was insured with EFU." Buksh visited London in 1963, 1964 and 1967 and was the main driving force of the EFU's business in London. "His hard work and tremendous expertise had mobilized the nation’s economy, even if infinitesimally." As business grew, Buksh became deputy general manager in December, 1963 and general manager in January, 1966 expanding the EFU's sales and influence throughout the region. Buksh competed fiercely with rival companies and did everything within his power to keep good performers from leaving the company. The prompt settlement of life insurance claims was a cornerstone of his mission. Whenever a death claim came in, he paid the money quickly, thus "saving many families from possible ruination." EFU's management credited Buksh's leadership for the company's remarkable progress. He also played a pivotal role in inducting new leaders into the insurance industry. His leadership helped to grow EFU into the largest company, not only in Pakistan, but in all Afro-Asian countries, excluding Japan. Starting from scratch, he developed the business to such heights that he became a "household name." The stories of his leadership style and compassion for others are inspiring.

=== Role in East Pakistan's life insurance growth and expansion ===
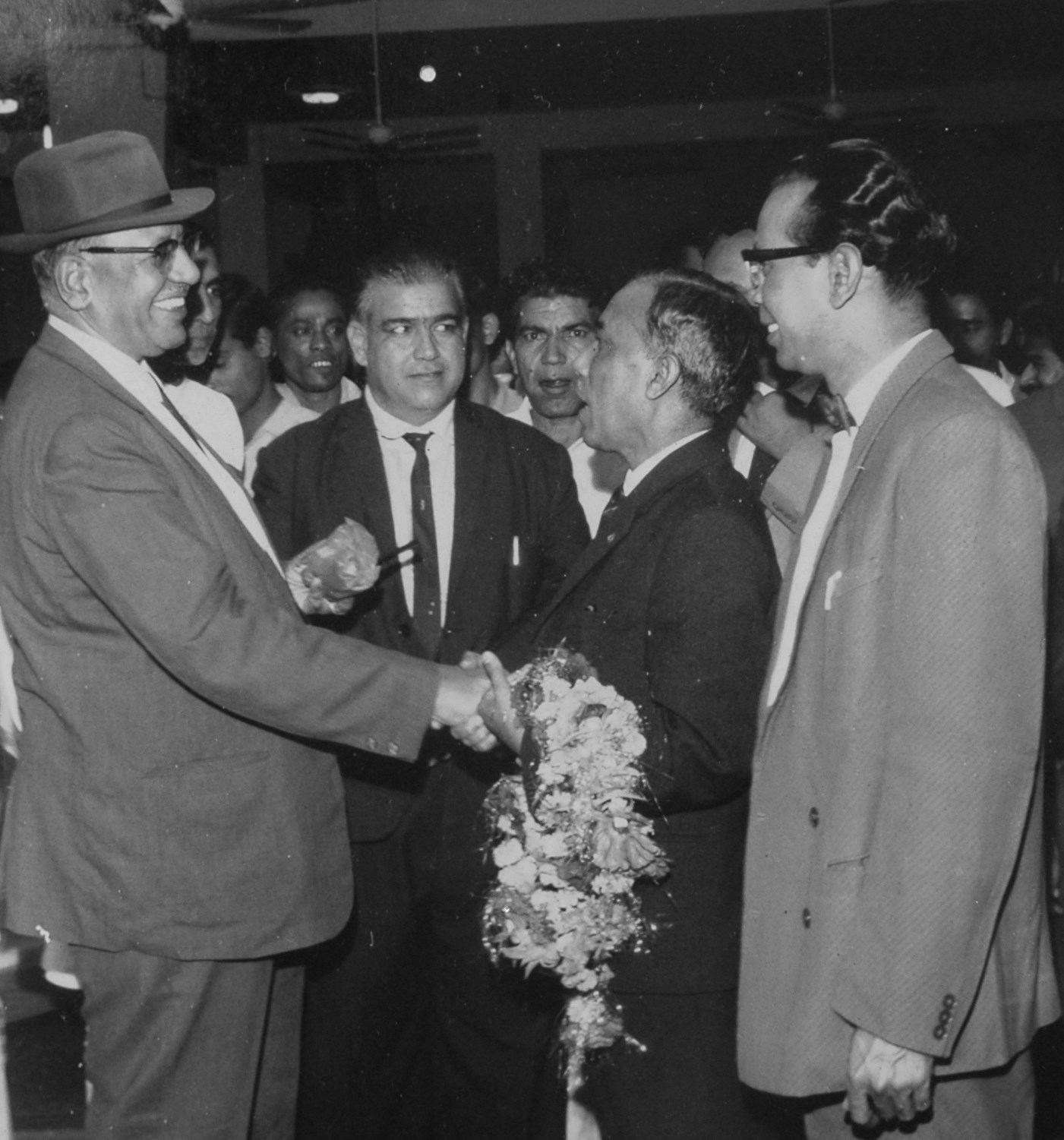
Khuda Buksh and his team receiving P.M. Robello at Tejgoan airport, Dacca, 1963. Robello of Life Insurance Corporation of India was invited by the EFU to train senior life insurance field officers at Dacca and Karachi.

As a leader of life department of the EFU, Buksh travelled across Pakistan. While staying six months or more in a year in East Pakistan, he continued his "untiring efforts" for the expansion of business growth and development with positive attitude encouraging his field force, telling them:

Be proud of your job. Let it be written in letters of gold in the pages of your mind that it is your honorable duty as a life insurance salesman to mobilize and channelize the social force of life insurance in the greater interest of your community.

Although his dream was to spread life insurance in every home, recruitment, training, field force organization and management, motivation, and team building continued to play a challenging role during this time. Buksh could realize the qualities of a person at every onset and knew how to select the person who fit a position best. During this period, he recruited more salesmen, including many educated Bengalis in the insurance profession. He often visited district towns on official duties. On such occasions, he would host gorgeous tea parties attended by students and university teachers. From there he took many to the insurance business. Buksh's motivation in selecting insurance profession as a career helped to change the lives of common marketing people. They earned more money from selling life insurance policies. Their economic status improved, quality of life changed and they were able to own cars, houses, and move to wealthy sections of the city.

He brought P.M. Robello, a reputed insurance personality from India to teach a six-week training course to senior officers of the EFU in Dacca and Karachi. When EFU management introduced two training schemes at Karachi, Buksh sent several Bengali officers there for training. At the same time, he focused on the full-fledged training scheme at Dacca through his senior sales officers and A.F.M Safiyyullah, director of planning and development. According to Safiyyullah, Buksh played a role, "as an educator to the vast number of field force[s] who placed faith in his leadership and took insurance as a career." In about a decade's time, quite a number of new recruits in the profession wrote crores of rupees worth of business per year. Buksh used his honesty, sincerity, devotion, and organizing skills. to lead his marketing team in expanding the life insurance business across the region. Although the life insurance business in West Pakistan was concentrated on the upper-class in large cities (Lahore, Karachi, Rawalpindi, Sind and Baluchistan), under his leadership, the business in East Pakistan was spread out all over the region (Dacca, Chittagong and the other 15 districts) at a grassroots level. Buksh personally generated business, and brought many successful salesmen into the industry, all while continuing to expand the company's clientele.

During that era, all insurance documents were in English. As a result of his love for the mother tongue, Buksh was instrumental in translating all paperwork related to the insurance industry into Bengali, including booklets and premium records. Buksh, often called a "Wizard of Insurance," transformed insurance into a social movement. He was credited with employing more Bengali people in the insurance industry than anyone before him. From 1951 to 1967, the number of life insurance policy holders more than tripled. The number of policies written by the EFU in 1967 was almost 40 percent of the total policies written by all Pakistani insurance companies. This development in the insurance industry signaled a significant shift in the culture: the life insurance industry had overcome ingrained religious beliefs in less than two decades. Fundamentalist propaganda diminished and "People of all backgrounds and income levels stopped viewing insurance as an invitation for their early demise and began to see it as protection for their families." Members of the general population who had once avoided insurance agents now came forward with the intent of buying insurance policies. This success was the realization of the national awareness campaigns on life insurance by Buksh from the beginning of his career. According to Buksh:

It gives me immense pleasure whenever I think that now-a-days no insurance worker is to carry with him a folding chair like me when I first started my career. Rather in the present day society, an insurance worker is the most honorable and welcome guest to a family. An insurance worker in modern times is not only provided with a comfortable sofa to sit on but he is even entertained with a delicious cup of tea or coffee as well.

Buksh is recognized as having "popularized life insurance in East Pakistan among the intellectuals" and transformed insurance into a "respectable profession."

=== Role in public relations ===
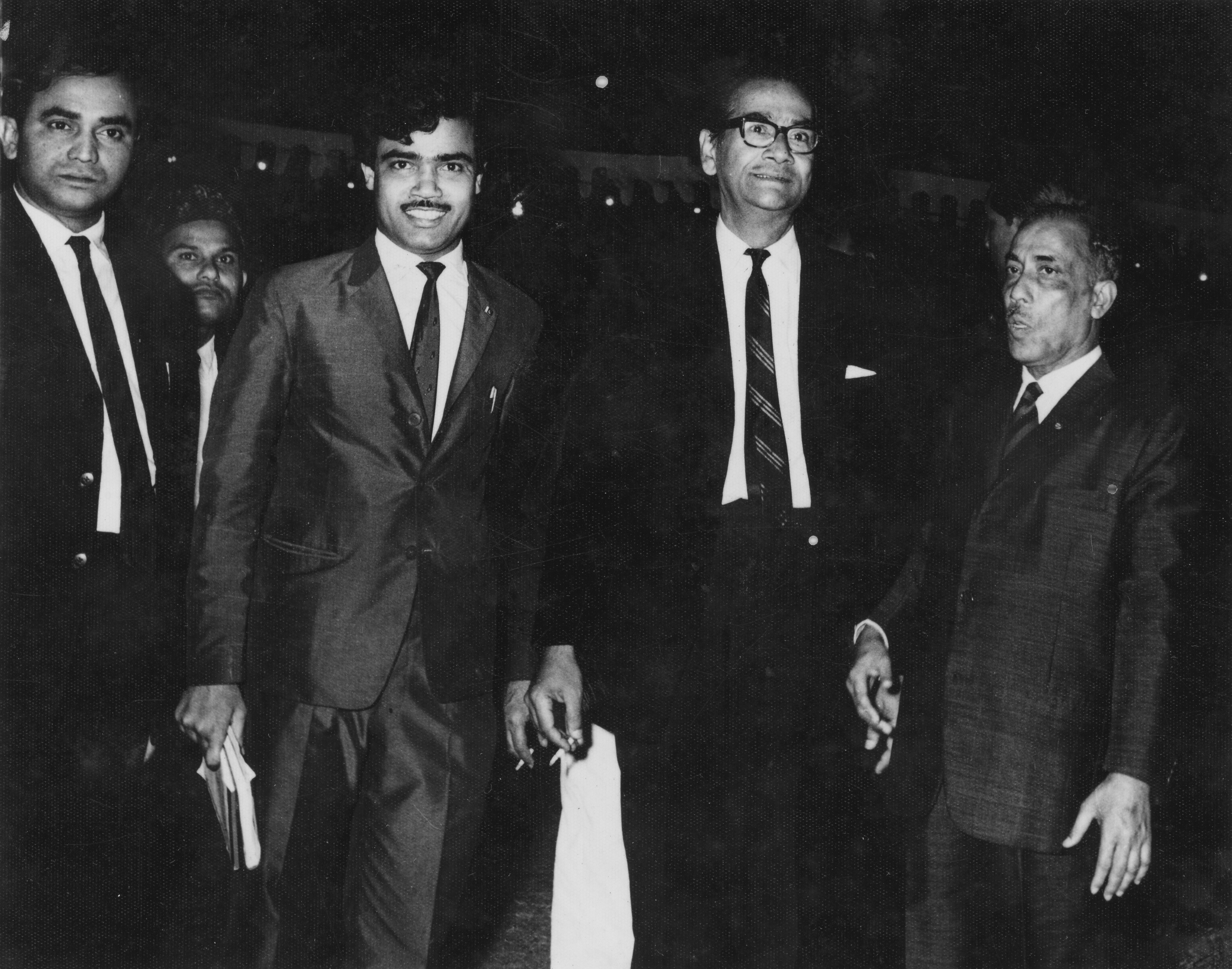
Khuda Buksh receiving S. M. Morshed, 3rd right (Chief Justice of East Pakistan) in a party, Muzzaffer Uddin Ahmed (Regional Manager), 1st left and Mir Mosharraf Hossain (secretary), 2nd left, 1967

Buksh believed the key to a successful career in business was to "build up human relations on a very personal level," a practice he followed throughout his life. According to Abdur Razzak, "He invited high-ranking people to tea parties or dinner, sometimes twice a month. He frequented various functions and also took part in multi-purpose social gatherings," all with the intention of developing and maintaining public relationships. Through vigorous public relations efforts, he connected with high-ranking government officials, insurance executives, industrialists, professionals, politicians, educators, and many other influential people. His circle of friends and contacts extended across Pakistan. He hosted dinners in large hotels not only in Dacca and Chittagong (East Pakistan) but also in Karachi, Lahore and other cities in West Pakistan. Some parties were called "Ladies Nights." Buksh often said, "Without women's cooperation, it is difficult to survive in such an unpopular occupation, let alone make headway." Faizur Razzaque said that "by entertaining acquaintances and friends he cultivated a fine brand of public relations." He was nominated twice as the president of Dacca Insurance Institute. Buksh, being a popular figure in both parts of the country commended a great deal of respects in both private and government circles and wherever he went, everyone regarded him highly. Due to his love for his mother tongue, each year on the first day of Pohela Boishakh (Bengali New Year) he would invite VIPs and journalists for lunch at his Dacca residence where only Bengali dishes were served. He was a popular Rotarian. "His noble disposition, simplicity in life, unflinching fidelity, and stern sense of duty won love and respect from everybody, whoever came in contact with him." His vast and extensive public relations experience helped expand the reach of the insurance business from the lower-middle class, to the educated sector to, finally, many influential "big guns of the society." These big guns included: S.M. Murshed (Chief Justice, East Pakistan) Abu Sayeed Chowdhury (former president of Bangladesh), Abul Kashem Khan (Industrialist), Mujibur Rahman (Civil servant, insurance executive), Muhammad Shahidullah (Bengali educationist, writer and linguist), Sufia Kamal (poet), Ataur Rahman Khan (lawyer, politician and writer), Sheikh Mujibur Rahman (head, of Alpha Insurance Company, East Pakistan later became Father of the Nation), Tajuddin Ahmed (Politician, later became Prime Minister), Abdus Salam (editor, Bangladesh Observer), and Abdul Jabbar Khan (Speaker Pakistan Assembly).

=== Role as a motivator ===
"He [Buksh] was a great motivator: He had a story or motivational point for every occasion," said Joseph Pereira. He motivated young people to join the profession, teaching them how "insurance is a service," and how in this noble, service-oriented profession, field workers might climb the ladder of success to reach their dreams. As a part of recruitment to students or teachers, he would sometimes give them an amount of money as an advance or give them a large amount for buying a car. "These he did to invite interest among people regarding the insurance business," said Mir Mosharraf Hossain. Having an "uncanny flair for life insurance," Buksh was "a master par excellence of human behavior in dealing with field people." He formally and informally incorporated a rewards system, using unique methods, techniques, ideas, and strategies to recognize and celebrate the superior performance of individuals or groups, motivating them to achieve excellence. With his un-assuming nature, Buksh involved himself "personally in the welfare of each field worker." He established personal relationships with agents, field officers, inspectors, and managers, treating them as though they were trusted family members and, in so doing, transformed the marketing team into a family. He carefully monitored and attended to the budgetary needs of each salesperson and treated his junior staff or field workers like his children. Buksh was a humanist, and had sympathy and empathy for his people. Actions characteristic of his management style included giving unexpected promotions and salary raises, offering to increase requested loan amounts, repaying loans to creditors, providing new cars, solving personal problems and arranging to deliver grocery supplies to households experiencing adverse circumstances. Buksh "loved his people, like a father would love his children. From Chittagong to Peshawar, he knew the name of each and every field worker, whether he was an agent, a manager or a regional manager." "People almost worshipped him because of his personality, kindness, and amiable nature." He was the "personal fan of every field worker." Due to their love and affection for Buksh, a large number of enthusiastic field workers would go to the airport at Karachi or Dacca to welcome him on his arrival or see him off on his departure. While public relations and motivation played important roles in life insurance development, Buksh's destiny about to change soon.

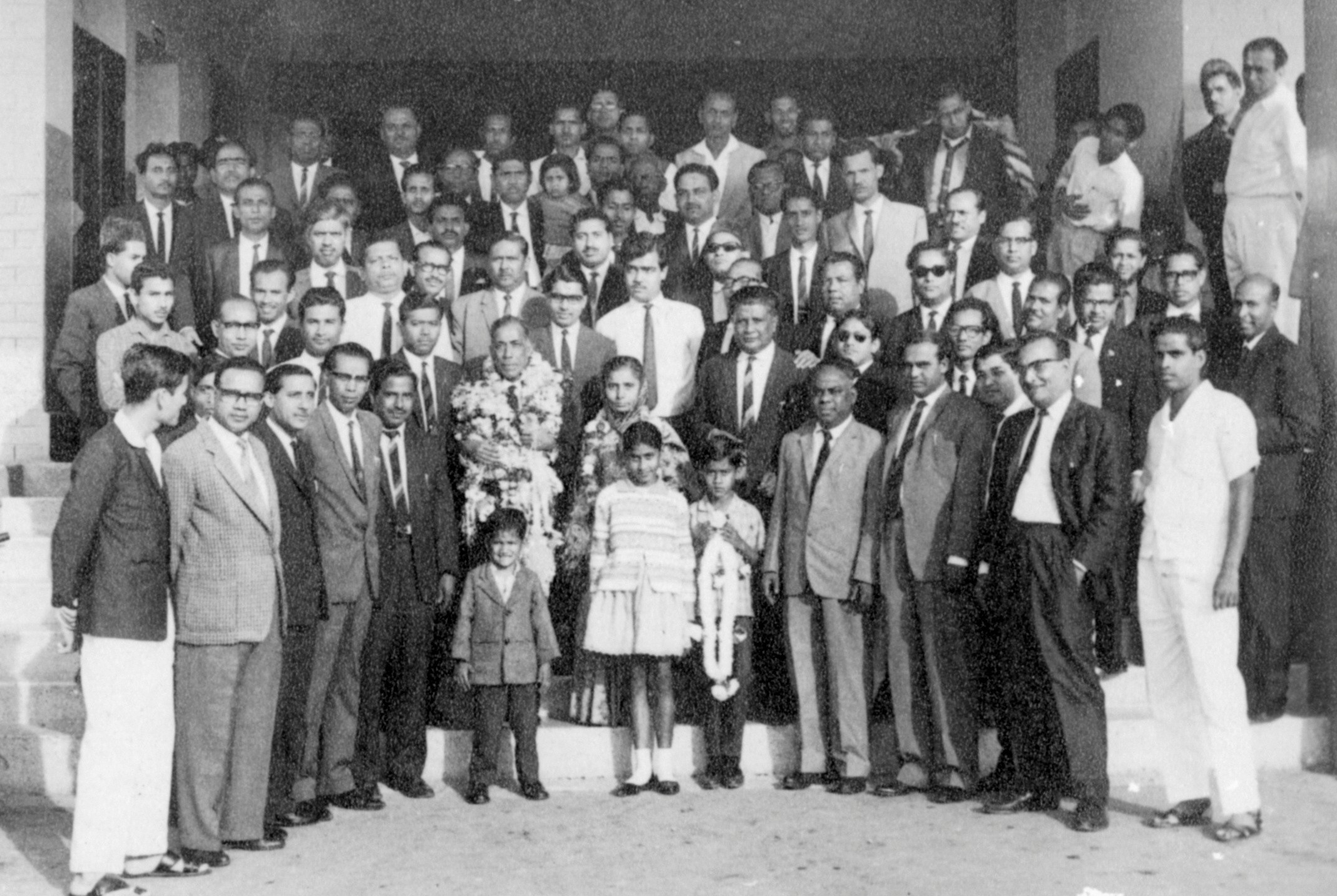
Khuda Buksh being greeted at Dacca Tejgoan airport by EFU regional management, field force and family members, January 1966.

=== Role in investment crisis ===
The central government of Pakistan deprived East Pakistan from economic development, distribution of foreign exchange, recruitment in civil administration and armed forces leading to wide disparities between two parts of Pakistan. The investment of insurance premium income was one of the factors that created a gulf of difference between East and West Pakistan. From 1947, the government of Pakistan neglected investment in East Pakistan. In 1964, out of a total investment of Rs. 280 million in insurance premiums, less than 5% was invested in East Pakistan, whereas more than 50 percent of the total insurance underwritten in Pakistan, came from East Pakistan. The lack of capital in East Pakistan became a stumbling block to the development of industries there. Premium income funds were mostly invested in West Pakistan, and as a result, West Pakistan's gain was East Pakistan's loss. President Ayub Khan was aware of discrepancies between East and West Pakistan. He attempted to achieve a power balance between the two wings of country. When he was looking for a suitable candidate for the highly prestigious position as Federal Minister of Commerce, the name of Khuda Buksh was recommended to him. Buksh met Ayub Khan at Rawalpindi and thanked him for the offer but declined to accept the job as he thought that ministerial job was a temporary job. However, he recommended the name of Waheduzzaman, one of his friends from his home district. Ayub Khan accepted Buksh's recommendation and appointed Waheduzzaman as Federal Minister of Commerce.

Buksh, "a man of extreme will power" and "selfless patriot," was an advocate for the investment of insurance premiums in East Pakistan. To make insurance facilities available in his homeland (Eastern Zone, East Pakistan), Buksh also took the initiative to construct a 24-story EFU building in Dacca. It was the tallest building in the country at that time. He was instrumental in purchasing the land, selecting the architect, and gaining the approval of the design and construction for the building from the government of East Pakistan. However, Buksh and Roshen Ali Bhimjee, the managing director of the EFU, had major disputes about the company's investment policy. Buksh "was not a political person, but he was a man of principle, and his love of justice, [along with his] fairness and advocacy for the interest of Bengalis brought him into clashes with Pakistani higher-ups." Buksh resigned on 10 April 1969, under a "humiliating circumstance at a crucial juncture of Pakistan's history." The Bangladeshi government later completed the EFU building in Dacca, now known as Jiban Bima Tower, signifying Buksh's "vision and spirit of nationalism."

== New company and aftermath (1969–1972) ==
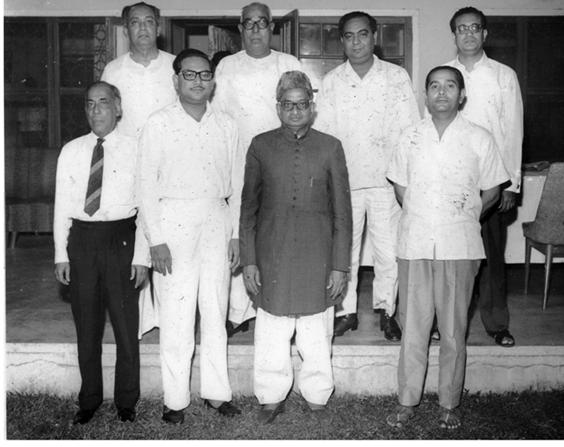
A group photo of Federal Life & General Insurance Company. Front Row, from left: Khuda Buksh, Ataul Haq, M.A. Hassan, M.A. Raquib. Rear row from left: Habibur Rahman, Ataur Rahman Khan, Waheduzzaman, M. Mashiur Rahman (Auditor). May 1969.

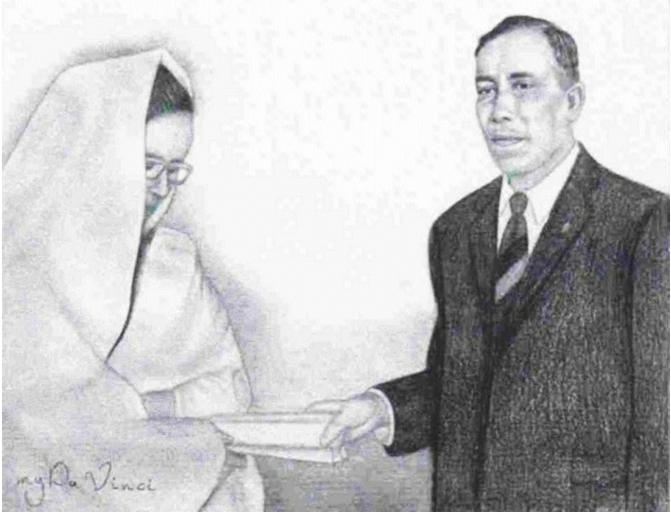
Khuda Buksh delivering insurance benefit check to Begum Zahida Rahman.

Amidst a 1969 uprising in East Pakistan, Buksh and nine other Bengali leading industrialists and businessmen serving as shareholders rapidly founded the Federal Life and General Insurance Company (FLAGIC) Ltd. Ataur Rahman Khan was the chairman, and Buksh became the managing director of the new company. FLAGIC opened its doors on 29 May 1969, in Dacca. Many salesmen who were working with him at the EFU resigned and joined the FLAGIC, and many Bengalis surrendered their policies at the EFU and bought policies at FLAGIC. Buksh continued to promptly settle of life insurance claims. For example, as a beneficiary, Begum Zahida Rahman received her insurance benefit check four days after the death of her husband After one year of operation, FLAGIC declared dividends to its shareholders, but business stalled when the country's political climate changed, leading to the Bangladesh War of Liberation. The war ended after nine months of fighting against the Pakistan Army by the Mukti Bahini and the Indian Army which got involved in the war at the last moment. Buksh's fifth son, M. Zillur Rahim joined the Mukti Bahini. East Pakistan broke away from West Pakistan, and the EFU lost its Eastern Zone. Bangladesh emerged as a new independent nation on the world map on 16 Dec 1971.

== Bangladesh insurance: the beginning (1972–1973) ==
The Bangladesh government nationalized all insurance companies except foreign and postal insurance. In May 1973, the government established the Bangladesh Jiban Bima Corporation (JBC) with Buksh, serving as its first managing director. JBC began doing business, having already an established infrastructure and manpower resources thanks to the major development work done by the EFU while Buksh was its leader in East Pakistan. JBC inherited 71 branches all over Bangladesh; it opened only two branches for business in 1973. Under Buksh's supervision, JBC sold upwards of 40,000 life insurance policies, with an approximate total assured sum of Tk. 400 million. As always, Buksh's goal was the settlement of claims without delay, and JBC succeeded in settling approximately 10,000 death claims from January 1972 to June 1974. This figure is remarkable given the number of deaths resulting from the Bangladesh War of Liberation. During this time, Buksh faced a highly hostile political foe in the JBC trade union. Clear conflicts arose between him and the union leaders due to their various illegal demands. Buksh did not budge from his position nor comply with these demands. He did not "compromise his principles even under tremendous political pressure of the unruly trade union leaders . . . Instead of leashing the unruly trade union leaders", the government dismissed him from JBC on 27 November 1973.

== Personal life ==
On 30 December 1939, Buksh married Zobeda Khatun (1922–2010). They had six sons and two daughters. Buksh was respectful to his parents, elders, and teachers. He developed a lifelong relationship with his middle school English teacher, Ainuddin Ahmed, whom he treated like "a son treats his father." Buksh arranged the marriage of countless number of marriageable girls. He spent time visiting sick family members, friends and acquaintances, and his presence was almost guaranteed at the marriage ceremonies and janazah. Buksh was a loving father and a humble person. He helped people throughout his life, sometimes in public, sometimes in secret. He was vehemently averse to publicity, and he was uninterested in money or material possessions. Most of his income was spent on entertaining his acquaintances and assisting the poor and destitute. "He loved the [common] man on the street, and big guns alike. He was often the last hope for financially distressed students." According to Dacca Rotary Club News, "He was extremely kind hearted, soft-[spoken], gentle, and human. He was endowed with the noblest human qualities [which] endeared him to a large mass of people . . . " A love of mankind was the central philosophy of his life. There were always a few extra young men in his residence from his village and less fortunate relatives. He took care of their welfare and sent them to school and college for education. Sympathy and compassion defined his nature. He contributed money to schools, colleges, and madrasas. He paid for the operation of a free primary school in his native home and bore the educational expenses of numerous students. In addition, he was a source of financial help for many widows, orphans, and students from middle-class families who could not afford school fees. In his private life, as head of his family, he was responsible and affectionate toward everyone. He was a friend to his children, and he guided and advised them to lead an honest life, to extend helping hands to poverty-stricken people, and not to be angry with anyone – a goal that he himself maintained all through his life. Buksh was mindful of his social responsibilities and the feelings of others. His love and hospitality towards his relatives, friends, and acquaintances always emanated from his wide heart. In spite of his busy schedule, he always found time to devote to his family. "He also put his heart, soul, and money into the development of insurance. As a result, it was his own life insurance policy that kept his family afloat after his death."

== Legacy ==
Buksh died in Dacca on 13 May 1974. Long obituaries appeared in newspapers and magazines across the nation. On 14 May 1974, the Dacca Rotary News reported, "He is the one figure among Bengali Muslims who popularized life insurance among the people. His name itself is an institution, and, in his own life-time, he became a legendary figure." Recognition of his accomplishments was also published in The Daily Ittefaq: Buksh will remain as an "unforgettable person in expanding life insurance in Bangladesh." On 15 May, The Daily Purbodesh published his profile under the heading "Life Sketch of Khuda Buksh, Jiban Bimar Jadugar" (life sketch of Khuda Buksh, Wizard of Insurance) Buksh was an important figure in the insurance industry of Pakistan and Bangladesh. He was widely known and well-respected while he was alive, became a life insurance icon in the years after he died. Despite winning only limited acclaim in his lifetime, he has been described as the "most magnetic and dynamic insurance executive" in Pakistan. At the time of his death, Buksh was "hailed as one of the great sons of Bengal soil." After he was nearly forgotten for about three decades, Wolfram Kornowski, a German colleague revived his legacy through his book The EFU Saga (2001). He was the first person who had "a materialistic discussion in national and international circles on the life and career of Khuda Buksh," under subchapter entitled "Khuda Buksh: Life insurance was his mission." In 2003, Buksh's family established the Khuda Buksh Memorial Trust and Foundation to keep his legacy alive. From 2009 to 2011, three books were published on Buksh's life and work. Buksh's lifelong work was to raise the standard of living of the common people by increasing insurance awareness. According to Shafique Khan, "His work towards the betterment of the Bengali Muslim community made him immortal . . . he will be remembered with deep respect as the man behind the resurrection of the Bengali Muslim community." Since his death, Buksh has been widely praised by his contemporaries in Pakistan and Bangladesh for his contributions in life insurance development. Harunur Rashid, said: "There is no denying [the] fact that it was [because of] Khuda Buksh's untiring efforts that the insurance industry made a mark in Bangladesh. I don't think that the insurance industry could have made such a sharp rise without him." Karnowski wrote:

He was an outstanding salesman who even in his dreams would only be able to think of life insurance; he was totally obsessed [with] it . . . A typical Bengali, small body, but with a big heart for everyone . . . he rose to the occasion and became a very big name in the field of life insurance, a profession he loved with all the vigor and determination he possessed.

Iftekher Hanfi and Rizwan Farid viewed him as a role model insurance personality. While in a discussion about erecting a monument in memory of Khuda Buksh, a renowned journalist commented, "There is no necessity to build a memorial for him. The history of insurance in Bangladesh itself is his memorial. He had no equal, no parallel and no rival. Insurance and Khuda Buksh are synonymous." Today, Buksh's legend lives on in both Bangladesh and Pakistan.

== Controversy ==
Buksh received many accolades for his contributions in life insurance development, but he was not immune from criticism by his contemporaries. His exit from the insurance industry came at the expense of an unruly trade union influenced by political parties. Ironically, it was Buksh who employed many trade union members and helped establish their lives in Dacca. Hedayetul Islam also notably pointed out Buksh's favoritism toward employing people from his home district, many of whom were ill-qualified for their positions. The issue of non-qualified workers was forefront in the illegal demands made by the JBC trade union. When asked about the issue by Mushtari Shaffi, Buksh clarified his position: "One can't love the whole country, unless, one loves the people of his own area." Abdur Razzak supported Buksh's favoritism, stating that, "I think he was 100 percent right in appointing them. If he did not do so, many families of our country would be totally eliminated." Regarding this topic, Harunur Rashid noted that Buksh frequently visited his native village and discovered that the fates of people of his village had not changed after partition of the sub-continent. When he joined the EFU, people of his native village flocked to him in search of employment. Being a philanthropist, he did not refuse them. He attempted to accommodate people according to their qualifications. It may be that, in some cases, the people he hired were not well-suited to their tasks. Still, Buksh felt compelled to assist them on humanitarian grounds. Rashid observed that although Buksh employed a few dozen of people from his home area, he also employed hundreds of people from various places other than his village. Despite controversies, Buksh became renowned by introducing insurance to the masses, spreading awareness of savings and changing the course of many lives through his forty years of hard work. He provided salvation from financial hardship to many families. Through his able leadership, he created jobs for thousands of young unemployed people of Bangladesh. The growth of the insurance industry in urban and rural areas resulted in the creation of new class of insurance workers providing new economic opportunities developing newly demarcated social groups. The insurance salesmen who emerged in the 1950s to 1960s under Buksh's tutelage eventually helped the industry to develop and progress.

== Praise for Khuda Buksh ==
We regarded him as a super salesman. In Eastern Federal, he rose from the position of a salesman to general manager and later became the managing director of Federal Life. We considered him as one of the greatest insurance magnates in Asia. —Mujib-ud-Doula

There was no team leader better than him in all Pakistan. His leadership skills surpassed even those of leaders in foreign countries. —Abul Mahmood

I think Khuda Buksh has influenced a lot of people . . . they tried to emulate him, they tried to follow his accomplishments. He set standards [for] of how to motivate people, how to get the maximum out of them. I think the whole insurance industry owes a lot to Mr. Khuda Buksh. He was a great person, a great personality. —Fasihuddin M.

If we measure with a balance between life insurance and Khuda Buksh, it will be extremely difficult to measure which one is heavier. A wizard and a legendary stature in insurance, Khuda Buksh's achievements will enliven the spirit of the Bengalis of today and tomorrow. —S. R.Khan

Mr. Khuda Buksh worked for the promotion of life insurance in a difficult time and other people entered the field after some ground had already been built . . . He not only promoted life insurance of the EFU, but he had promoted life insurance in Pakistan —Vazir Ali Mohammed

Around the clock, whenever he used to meet people, he used to talk about insurance, insurance and insurance – that was his day and night dream . . . The growth of new life insurance business: In this sector Mr. Khuda Buksh was the undisputed leader . . . —C. M. Rahman

The field force is as dearer to him as his family members. He passed days and nights with them, leaving his family away; the love and respect of the field force inspires him to work day and night. —E.C. Iven

He used to say, think of insurance, dream of insurance, and sleep with insurance. . . He was a very loving person. I don’t think I’ve ever come across such a dynamic person with whom I will work again. He was an extraordinary leader and an unbeatable legend of insurance. —Sharafat Ali Quereshin

He gave birth to insurance in Bangladesh. From religious point of view, insurance was then prohibited. From such a difficult situation, he managed to bring insurance to such a height . . . He was uncommonly popular . . . I have never seen such a dedicated, devoted insurance worker in my life. We have failed to even go near him. —A.R. Chowdhury

Buksh was one of the outstanding life insurance men of his generation in Asia and his story can match that of anyone who was instrumental in growing the business in any country. —William Rabel

As far as promotion of [the] life insurance business in Pakistan is concerned, I think — especially in the '50s and '60s — Mr. Khuda Buksh's role was undoubtedly the greatest. —Joseph A. Pereira

Khuda Buksh had displayed exceptional caliber as a life insurance man in EFU. He was extremely successful as a business planner, salesman, sales executive . . . The business volume of EFU in life had reached at such a level that the company could advertise that every second person having life insurance policy was insured with EFU. It was no mean success, in my view, and the credit goes almost entirely to Khuda Buksh . . . Khuda Buksh died relatively early and deprived Bengal of his immense value as a life insurance man. The man was a genius. —Mohammed Choudhury

== Awards ==
- In 1963, Buksh received Gold Medal from EFU at its first conference held at Karachi, Pakistan.
- In 1965, Buksh received Silver Replica of Lahore Shalimar Garden for Managing Director's Award in West Pakistan, Lahore.
- In 1973, Buksh was commissioned a Kentucky Colonel, Governor of Kentucky, USA.
- In 2008, Buksh was awarded for his best contribution in insurance industry (posthumous) by Bank & Bima Magazine (28 February, Bank-Bima Award 2007).
- In 2008, Buksh was awarded Bima Padak 2008 (posthumous) by Bangladesh Insurance Executive Club.

== Selected list of works ==
=== Articles ===
- Buksh, Khuda. (18 April 1961) Selling Life Insurance Successfully — A Career. Pakistan Observer, 18 April 1961.
- Buksh, Khuda. (5 March 1963) 30 Progressive Years — EFU 1932 to 1962. Pakistan Observer Supplement.
- Buksh, Khuda.(July 1965) Life Insurance Selling — A Profession. Eastern Federal News Bulletin, Vol II, no. 6, July 1965.
- Buksh, Khuda. (9 February 1967) A Reminiscence: When I look Back. Pakistan Observer.
- Buksh, Khuda (June 1967) Aamar Smritikatha (My Memoir). EFU Eastern Zone Field Force Review. (Bengali) (note: The article has been translated in English and presented in the book MOALIIKB)
- Buksh, Khuda. (July 1967) Your Duty Onerus. Symposium Life Insurance Pakistan.
- Buksh, Khuda (1967, August) Foreword. On to Ultima Thule: A Loud Thinking of Life Insurance in Pakistan.
- Buksh Khuda. (1972, June) Nationalization of Insurance— An Appraisal. Business Chronicle, University of Dacca, First Issue.
