= Dilkusha, Dhaka =

Coordinates: 23.726666°N 90.419115°E

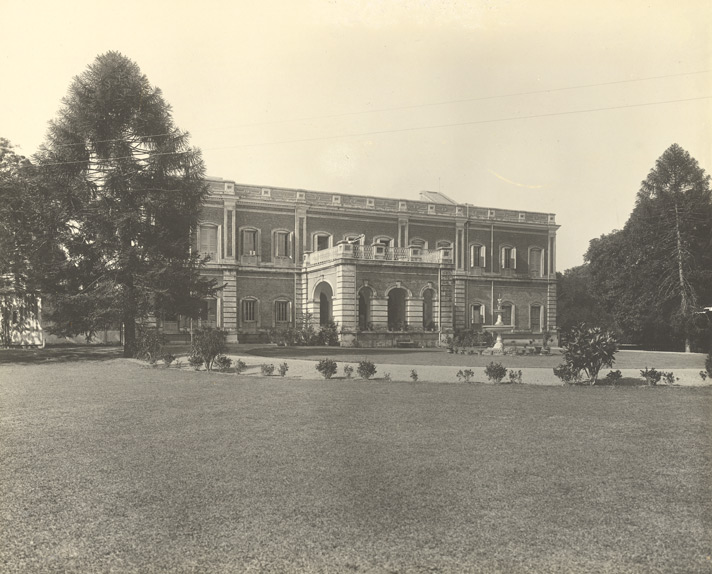
Nawab's Dilkusha Garden House, Dhaka (1904) by Fritz Kapp.

Dilkusha is the commercial centre of Dhaka, the capital of Bangladesh. It is a part of the larger Motijheel area in the city. Historically, the Nawabs of Dhaka used to have a garden palace here in the 19th and early 20th century. Dilkusha was the name of that palace. The Dilkusha garden house was built in 1866 by Nawab Khwaja Abdul Ghani. Nawab's Dilkusha Bhulbhulaiya Garden Tower was also located in Dilkusha area.

The area also has a sports club called Dilkusha SC, which is mainly known for its football team.
