= Bangladesh Employees Welfare Board =

Government agency

- Formation: 2004
- Headquarters: Dhaka, Bangladesh
- Region served: Bangladesh
- Official language: Bengali
- Director General: Nahid Rashid
- Website: www.bkkb.gov.bd

The Bangladesh Employees Welfare Board is a government board responsible for the welfare of government employees in Bangladesh. Located in Dhaka, the board is headed by a director general.

== History ==
The Bangladesh Employees Welfare Board was established on 29 January 2004. In 2013, protestors from Jamaat-e-Islami Bangladesh and Hefazat-e-Islam Bangladesh damaged 53 buses of the board kept at its depot at Dilkusha. The government announced plans to build a 30-story highrise to generate income for the board. The board was updated through the passage of Bangladesh Employees Welfare Board (amendment) Act, 2017.
