= A. Z. M. Shamsul Alam =

Bangladeshi civil servant and Islamic banker

A. Z. M. Shamsul Alam (died 25 July 2025) was a civil servant, Islamic banker, and the rector of the Bangladesh Public Administration Training Centre. He was a director general of the Islamic Foundation Bangladesh. He was the founding chairman of Al-Arafah Islami Bank. He was an advisor to the board of directors of the Islami Commercial Insurance PLC.

== Early life ==
Alam was born in Comilla.

== Career ==
Alam was the rector of the Bangladesh Public Administration Training Centre from 11 January 1990 to 31 July 1990. He was an executive director of the Jamuna Multipurpose Bridge Authority. He retired from the civil service as a secretary. In 1995, he founded Al-Arafah Islami Bank and became its first chairman.

During the Bangladesh Nationalist Party-Bangladesh Jamaat-e-Islami rule, Alam served as the director general of the Islamic Foundation. He was appointed director general in October 2003, replacing Syed Ashraf Ali. He sought funding from the Saudi Arabian embassy for the renovation of the Baitul Mukarram National Mosque.

Alam was an independent director of Islami Commercial Insurance PLC. He was associated with the Tamaddun Majlish.

Alam died on 25 July 2025 in Dhaka.

== Bibliography ==
- Democracy and Election.
- Bureaucracy in Bangladesh Perspective.
- Administration and Ethics.
