= Jiban Bima Corporation =

- Jiban Bima Corporation logo
- Headquarters: Motijheel, Dhaka, Bangladesh
- Website: https://jbc.gov.bd

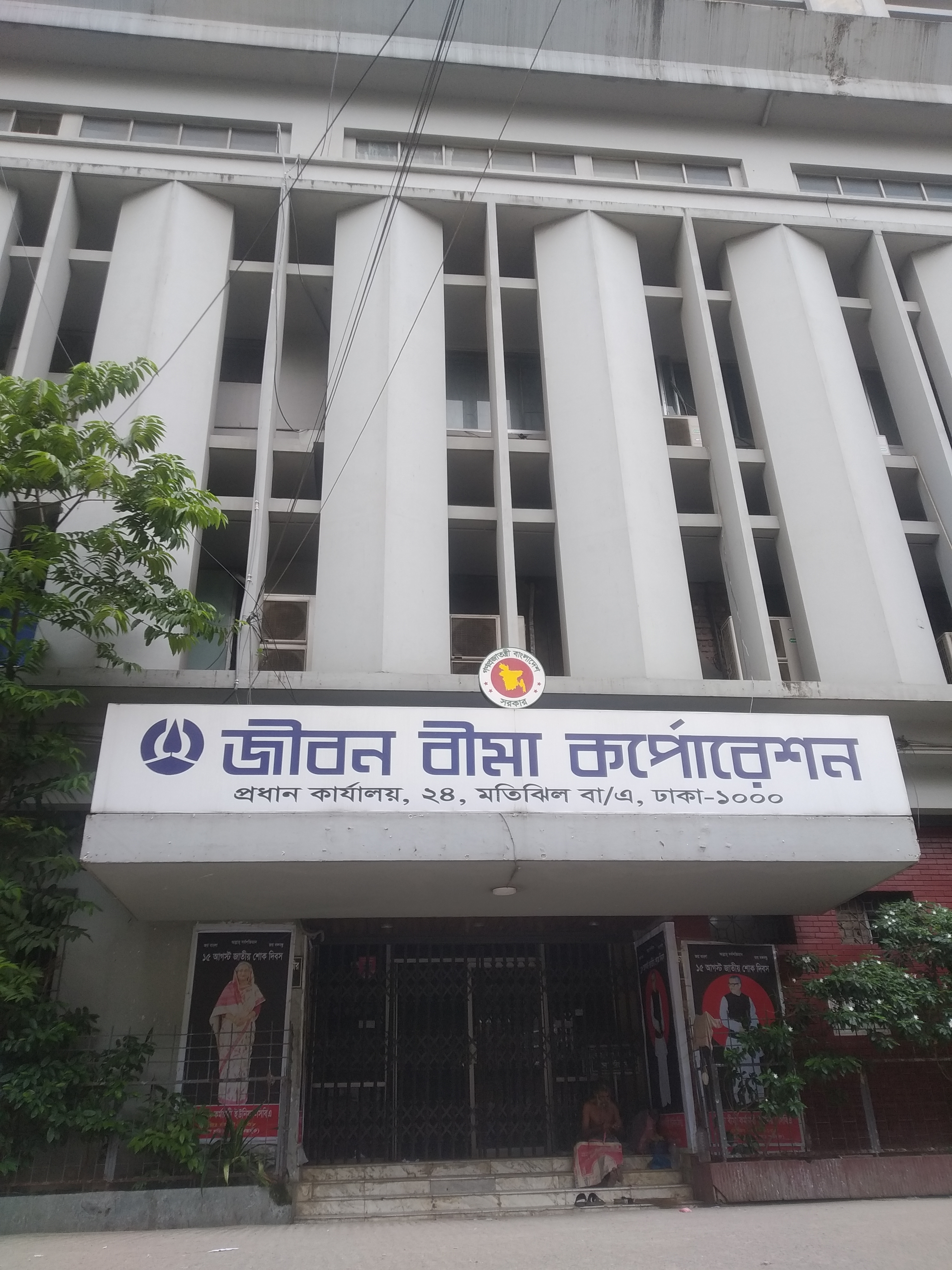
Headquarter of Jiban Bima Corporation

Jiban Bima Corporation (JBC) is the state-run life insurance corporation in Bangladesh under the provisions of the Insurance Act 1938, Insurance Rules 1958, and related other laws enforceable in Bangladesh in Bangladesh Corporation Act 1973. The JBC started on 14 May 1973 with assets and liabilities worth TK. 157 million of defunct 37 life Insurance companies.

== History ==
=== Pakistan period (1947–1971) ===
After partition of India three insurance companies were under Muslim ownership: The Eastern Federal Union Insurance Company Limited, Muslim Insurance Company Limited and Habib Insurance Company Limited. These three companies moved to Pakistan and registered to transact business there. The total number of insurers (life plus life and general) registered in Pakistan in 1951, 1961 and 1971 were 13, 17 and 75 respectively. In 1971, out of 75, ten of the 40 Pakistani companies were exclusively engaged in life insurance business, 21 in life and other business, and 9 in other business only. There were only four foreign insurance companies marketed their products in Pakistan in 1971: Norwich Union Life Assurance Society, Pearl Assurance Company Limited, Prudential Assurance Company Limited and American Life Insurance Company Limited.

=== Bangladesh period (1971–1973) ===
The number of insurance companies that had business in East Pakistan was 75, of which 10 were locally incorporated ones. Following the independence of Bangladesh in 1971, both life and general insurance business in the country was nationalised under the Bangladesh Insurance (Nationalisation) Order 1972 except foreign insurance companies. Five corporations were established to absorb, own and control the businesses of the 75 existing insurance companies and these new corporations were Bangladesh Jatiya Bima Corporation, Karnafuli Bima Corporation, Tista Bima Corporation, Surma Jiban Bima Corporation and Rupsa Jiban Bima Corporation. These four corporations were in business from 1 January 1973 to 14 May 1973.

==== Management and creation of the JBC ====
Bangladesh government selected Hafizur Rahman and Mujibur Rahman as the chairman and the managing director of the Jatiya Bima Corporation respectively. A.K.M. Fazlul Haque (Mowla), Khuda Buksh and Ali Ahmed were selected as the directors of the Jatiya Bima Corporation. Four separate chairpersons were appointed by the Jatiya Bima Corporation to administer the four corporations. Mustafizur Rahman Khan, Golam Mowla, M.A. Rahim and M.A. Samad became the chairmen of Karnafuli, Teesta, Rupsa and Surma Corporation respectively. In addition, four directors were appointed under each corporation to handle administration, development, underwriting and claims and finance and accounts. In March 1973, A.H.M. Qamruzzaman became the minister of commerce and reorganised the insurance companies within two months. On 14 May 1973, the Bangladesh government dissolved the Jatiya Bima Corporation and integrated the general and life insurance companies into two corporations, and accordingly all the undertakings of Karnafuli and Teesta were vested in the Sadharan (General) Bima Corporation with Golam Mowla as the first managing director. Surma and Rupsa Jiban Bima Corporations were vested in the Bangladesh Jiban Bima Corporation (Bangladesh Life Insurance Corporation) (BJBC) with Khuda Buksh as the first managing director.

=== Emergence of private companies ===
Until 1985, the JBC was the only institution to handle life insurance business in Bangladesh. Through the Insurance (Amendment) Ordinance 1984 and Insurance Corporations (Amendment) Ordinance 1984, the government allowed the private sector to establish insurance companies. Up to December 2000, at least 17 private sector insurance companies came into being and made the life insurance business competitive. In 2015 the number of private life insurance companies in Bangladesh has reached at 30.

== Insurance schemes ==
The JBC offers 15 different types of life insurance schemes. These are whole life assurance, endowment assurance, child protection policy, children endowment, anticipated endowment assurance, pension scheme policy, single payment policy, mortgage protection policy, group term insurance policy, group endowment policy, group variable endowment policy, group pension policy, grameen bima policy, joint life endowment policy, and progressive premium policy.

== Business performance ==
=== 1973–1974 ===
In 1973 and 1974, the JBC sold 41,812 and 36,000 life insurance policies with a total assured sum of Tk 397.7 and Tk. 400 million respectively. In 1973 and 1974 the JBC earned gross premiums of Tk. 58 million and Tk. 67.6 million which comprised first year premiums (including group) Tk. 22.7 million and Tk. 29.6 million, renewal premiums Tk. 35.3 million and Tk. 37 million respectively. The JBC inherited an outstanding claim of Tk.50 million at the time of its inception. It has settled all the claims by 31 October 1974.

=== 1998–2011 ===
In 1998, the JBC earned gross premiums of Tk. 1,402.8 million, which comprised first-year premiums (Tk. 401.2 million), renewal premiums (Tk. 913.0 million), and group insurance premiums (Tk. 88.6 million). It paid Tk. 493.7 million to settle life insurance claims under various schemes. Premium income of the corporation was Tk. 2,447 million in 2007 marking an increase 63% over premium income in 2001. Subsequently, the life fund of the JBC has increased to Tk. 13.15 billion, up to the year 2011, which was only Tk. 218.3 million in 1973. The JBC has paid Tk. 15.81 billion against various claims, the highest such payments in the country's life Insurance business. The JBC's investment has reached Tk. 11.99 billion from only Tk. 197 million in 1973. The JBC has the largest network all over the country with 7 regional, 9 zonal, 68 sales and 343 branch offices.

=== 2011–2022 ===
The life fund of Jiban Bima Corporation has increased to TK. 14988.3 million (14.99 billion) in the year 2013. In the year 2012 the figure was near about 14 billion despite political unrest throughout the year.

== See also ==
- Insurance Development & Regulatory Authority of Bangladesh
