= Department of Government Transport =

Bangladeshi government department

- Formation: 1971
- Headquarters: Dhaka, Bangladesh
- Region served: Bangladesh
- Official language: Bengali
- Website: Department of Government Transport

Department of Government Transport is the government department responsible for providing transport to government departments and agencies and maintenance of the government transport pool vehicles in Bangladesh and is located in Dhaka, Bangladesh. It is under the Ministry of Public Administration. It is responsible for deputy secretaries to senior government secretaries.

== History ==
Department of Government Transport traces its origins to the Home Transport Department in 1947 by the British Raj government. After the Independence of Bangladesh, it was converted into a fully fledged department by the government of Bangladesh in 1971.
