= BIAM Foundation =

Research institute in Bangladesh

- Formation: 1991
- Headquarters: Dhaka, Bangladesh
- Region served: Bangladesh
- Official language: Bengali
- Website: BIAM Foundation

BIAM Foundation or Bangladesh Institute of Administration and Management is an autonomous state business institute located in Dhaka, Bangladesh. This is an autonomous training and research institute that is affiliated to Ministry of Public Administration and conducts training ranging from Foundation Training Course (FTC) for Bangladesh Civil Service (BCS) cadre officer to departmental training for other government organisations. It also conducts customized training for private organisations. It has modern hostel facility located at Hatirjheel area. It has auditorium facilities for rent.

== History ==
Bangladesh Institute of Administration and Management was established in 1991. Since 2000, the foundation has established 17 BIAM Laboratory Schools and three BIAM Model School and College. In November 2002, the government of Bangladesh converted the institute into the BIAM Foundation with the help of a resolution. It became self financed and is associated with Bangladesh Administrative Service Association.

=== Explosion ===
On 28 February 2024, an explosion occurred in a room of the BIAM Foundation in Eskaton, Dhaka, killing office assistant Md. Abdul Malek and driver Md. Faruk. Initially, the incident was believed to be caused by an AC explosion. However, a later investigation by the Police Bureau of Investigation- PBI revealed it was a case of premeditated arson. According to the findings, the fire was set intentionally to destroy important documents belonging to the association. The PBI arrested two individuals linked to the incident, one of whom was an administrative officer at the organization.
