= Sheikh Maqsood Ali =

Bangladeshi civil servant and writer (died 2019)

- Born: 1933/34
- Died: 25 August 2019
- Education: University of Dhaka; University of Manchester

Sheikh Maqsood Ali was a Bangladeshi civil servant, researcher, writer and organiser of the Liberation War of Bangladesh. He served as Secretary of Ministry of Relief and Rehabilitation of Bangladesh.

== Biography ==
Ali passed MA in Economics from University of Dhaka in 1956. Then he joined Central Civil Service of former Pakistan in 1959. Later he became the Deputy Director of Civil Service Academy in Lahore. Then, he went to the United Kingdom to receive his PhD degree from University of Manchester. He was an organiser of Liberation War of Bangladesh in the United Kingdom in 1971. He received PhD degree from University of Manchester in 1972.

Ali was appointed Joint Secretary of Ministry of Shipping, Inland Water Transport and Civil Aviation in 1972 after returning to Bangladesh. He was the founding Rector of Bangladesh Public Administration Training Centre. He was appointed Director General of Civil Officer's Training Academy and the National Institute of Public Administration in 1975. He also served as Secretary of Ministry of Relief and Rehabilitation and member of Bangladesh Planning Commission.

Ali wrote in local and international journals and published several books. His research book From East Bengal to Bangladesh was published in 2009. He is the brother-in-law of Mahbub Talukdar. He died on 25 August 2019 at the age of 85.
