= Mohammad Mezbah Uddin Chowdhury =

Bangladeshi civil servant

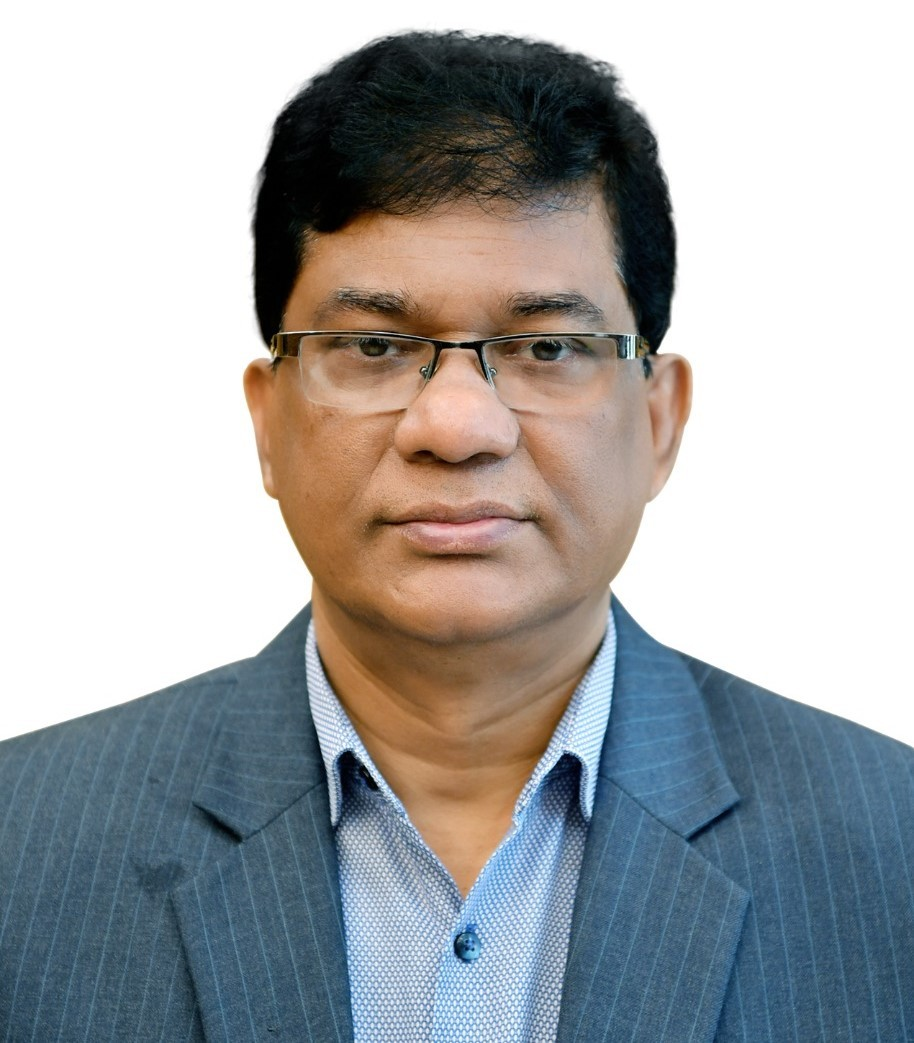
Mohammad Mezbah Uddin Chowdhary

Mohammad Mezbah Uddin Chowdhury is a retired Bangladeshi Civil Servant and former Senior Secretary of the Ministry of Public Administration. Prior to this appointment, he served as Secretary of the Ministry of Shipping and Local Government Division.

== Career ==
Chowdhury joined the Bangladesh Civil Service as an assistant commissioner in 1991.

He was ex-offocio member at the Bangladesh Institute of Governance and Management while serving as Senior Secretary, Ministry of Public Administration.

Chowdhury was the joint secretary of Cabinet Division in 2017. In 2018, he was the Sylhet Divisional Commissioner.

In February 2020, Chowdhury was transferred from additional Secretary to Appointment Promotion and Deputation Wing of Ministry of Public Administration to Secretary of the Ministry of Shipping. Chowdhury launched an alternate ferry service for the Shimulia-Kathalbari route on an experimental basis. He suggest using waterways to trade with India to reduce costs. He advocated using the India-Bangla protocol routes under Bangladesh Inland Water Transport Authority and highlighted the opportunity for Bangladesh to trade with the Seven Sister States of India. He was present in negotiations with the Water transport workers which led to the strike ending. He reported that a ferry hit the pillar of the Padma Bridge due to negligence of the crew. He was present at the 2.34 billion BDT contract signing between Chattogram Port Authority and Nippon Koei JV.

He was present at the inauguration function of a 7.93 billion BDT dredging project for Mongla Port led by chairman of the port Rear Admiral Mohammad Musa in March. He saw the launch of Matarbari Port. He sought approval in principle for US$58 million from the Cabinet Committee on Economic Affairs to upgrade Chattogram Port. In December 2021, he was included in the delegation led by Khalid Mahmud Chowdhury, State Minister for Shipping, to the Expo 2020.

In March 2022, Chowdhury, as secretary of the Ministry of Shipping, worked to bring the crew of MV Banglar Samriddhi from Ukraine. It had been hit by a missile in the Black Sea during the 2022 Russian invasion of Ukraine killing one of the crew member. He was present at the graduation ceremony of the Bangladesh Marine Academy. In May 2022, he was transferred from the Secretary of the Ministry of Shipping to the Secretary of the Local Government Division. He served in the Minister of Local Government and Rural Development during the tenure of Md Tazul Islam while he was Minister.

On 27 October 2022, Chowdhury was promoted to senior secretary. On 31 October, he was transferred from the Local Government Division to the Ministry of Public Administration replacing KM Ali Azam. He launched the Government Employee Management System for the public administration. According to The Daily Star, he oversaw significant changes in the public administration postings before the general election in 2024.

He was made an officer on special duty after the fall of the Sheikh Hasina led Awami League government and Md. Mokhlesur Rahman was appointed his replacement.
