= EFU House =

Building in Karachi, Pakistan

Qamar House
- قمر خانہ
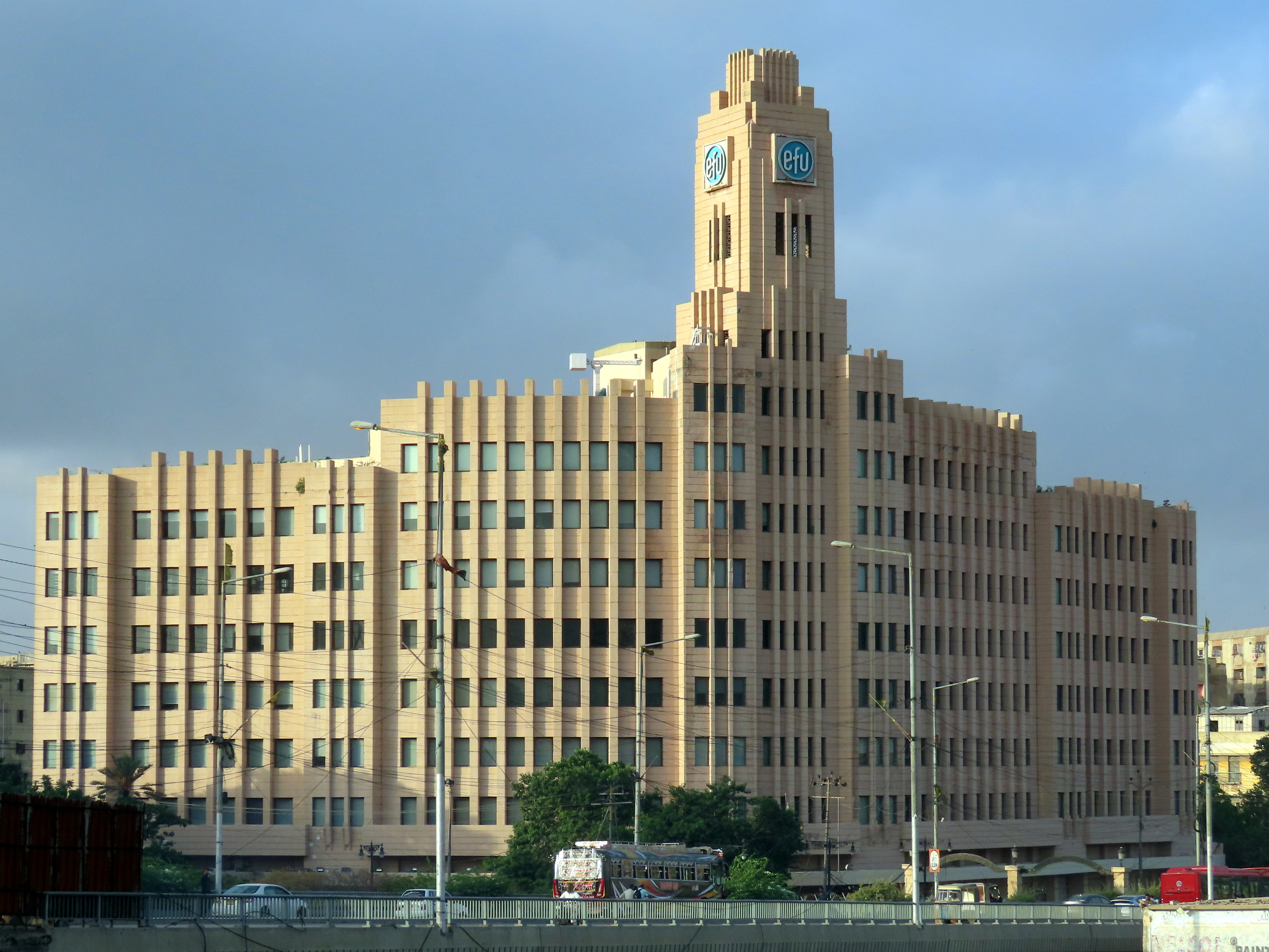
- Interactive map of the Qamar House area
- Former names: Qamar House
- Alternative names: EFU Building

General information
- Architectural style: Art Deco
- Location: 16/2 G.K.8 Ghulam Hussain Kassim Quarters, M. A. Jinnah Road, Karachi, Sindh, Pakistan
- Coordinates: 24.8477°N 66.9942°E
- Elevation: 29 ft (8.8 m) above msl
- Current tenants: Eastern Federal Union (EFU Life) Insurance Company
- Construction started: 1946
- Completed: 1955
- Inaugurated: 1957
- Cost: Rs 2.4M in 1957
- Landlord: Qamardin & Other’s 1945-2002; EFU-2002 onward

Height
- Height: 129 ft (39 m)

Dimensions
- Diameter: Trapezoidal
- Other dimensions: 150×300 ft (46×91 m)

Technical details
- Structural system: RCC Frame in filled masonry
- Floor count: 12
- Floor area: 268,056 sq ft (24,903.2 m^{2})

Design and construction
- Architect: Qamardin Mahomed Hashwani (QMH)
- Structural engineer: A Mevawalla
- Civil engineer: Ahmedali Mahomed Hashwani (AMH)
- Quantity surveyor: Qamardin Hashwani with Qamardin Valliani
- Awards: Sindh Government Recognition 15 April 2011 National Heritage Monument, EFU House (Qamar House)

Other information
- Parking: Open plot (cos) 125 sq yd (105 m^{2})

Website
- efuinsurance.com/conventional/company/about-efu.php

References
- Qamardin Jaffer Valliani: Procurement for building Qamar House & facilities maintenance management till 2002

Qamar House, now known as the EFU Building, is a building in central Karachi, Pakistan, designed in the Art Deco architectural style by Qamardin Mahomed Hashwani in 1945 and built on Muhammad Ali Jinnah Road between 1946 and 1955 by Qamardin & Co. It was the tallest building in Karachi until the construction of the Habib Bank Plaza building by the AKFED (Aga Khan Fund for Economic Development) in 1968.

== Location ==
Qamar House was built on Muhammad Ali Jinnah Road across from the Karachi Port Trust Building erected in colonial prepartition times, and in the vicinity of the Merewether Clock Tower another colonial preparation monument in Karachi.

== Details ==
Qamar House was designed by Qamardin Mahomed Hashwani in 1945 in the Art Deco style, and was built in partnership with Qamardin Jaffer Valliani and both their brothers and partners Ahmedali Mahomed Hashwani and Tajdin Jaffer Valliani by their Partnership Qamardin & Others. It has 12 floors, and is 129 feet in height.

While Qamar House was being built its recognition spread beyond Pakistan. On 5 July 1957 Aga Khan III appointed Qamardin Mahomed Hashwani as his Honorary Architect for Pakistan. His appointment for Pakistan was reaffirmed by Aga Khan IV succeeding his grandfather, when he appointed Qamardin as Honorary Architect for life for various projects throughout Pakistan.

== Qamar House ==
From inception in 1948 till 2002 Qamar House was initially owned by four original partners of Qamardin & Others: Qamardin Mahomed Hashwani 25%, Qamardin Jaffer Valliani 25%, Ahmed Ali Mahomed Hashwani 25%, Tajdin Jaffer Valliani 25%; subsequently, original four owners successively gifted of their 25% shares sub-fractionally to members within each of their nuclear families.

== EFU ==
It was acquired by EFU in 2002 to be the head office for Eastern Federal Union, the largest insurance company in Pakistan. Afterwards, it was officially named EFU Building.
