= National Academy for Planning and Development =

Coordinates: 23.7350°N 90.3880°E

National Academy for Planning and Development (NAPD)
- জাতীয় পরিকল্পনা ও উন্নয়ন একাডেমি (এনএপিডি)
- Type: Government training organization
- Established: 1980
- Chairman: Hon'ble Minister A H M Mustafa Kamal
- Academic staff: 33
- Location: Dhaka, Bangladesh
- Campus: Katabon Road, Nilkhet
- Website: www.napd.gov.bd

National Academy for Planning and Development (NAPD) is a government not-for-profit training and research institution under the Bangladesh Ministry of Public Administration that specializes in post-graduate education related to public management and development. The academy became operational on 3 February 1985. It was made a statutory organization in 2014.
