= Khandker Md. Iftekhar Haider =

Bangladeshi secretary and treasurer

Khandker Md. Iftekhar Haider is a retired secretary and treasurer and acting vice chancellor of Independent University, Bangladesh. He is a former secretary of the Ministry of Expatriates' Welfare and Overseas Employment. He is a former chairman of the Probashi Kallyan Bank. He was a rector of the Bangladesh Public Administration Training Center.

== Early life ==
Haider did his bachelor's degree and masters in English literature from the University of Rajshahi. He did a second masters in international economic relations from the University of Dhaka.

== Career ==
Haider joined the Bangladesh Civil Service in 1983.

From 17 February 2014 to 9 December 2014, Haider was the rector of the Bangladesh Public Administration Training Centre. He was replaced by A. K. M. Abdul Awal Majumder. From 10 December 2014 to 8 February 2016, he was the secretary of the Ministry of Expatriates' Welfare and Overseas Employment. He is the former chairman of Probashi Kallyan Bank.

In June 2017, Haider was appointed treasurer of Independent University, Bangladesh. He was a fellow of the Danish International Development Agency.

Haider was reappointed treasurer of Independent University, Bangladesh in May 2021. On 15 August 2024, Tanweer Hasan resigned as the vice chancellor of Independent University, Bangladesh following student protests. Niaz Ahmed Khan replaced Hasan but was later appointed vice-chancellor of the University of Dhaka. Haider then became the acting vice-chancellor of Independent University, Bangladesh.
