= EFU Insurance =

Pakistan-based insurance company

EFU Group
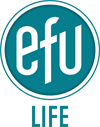

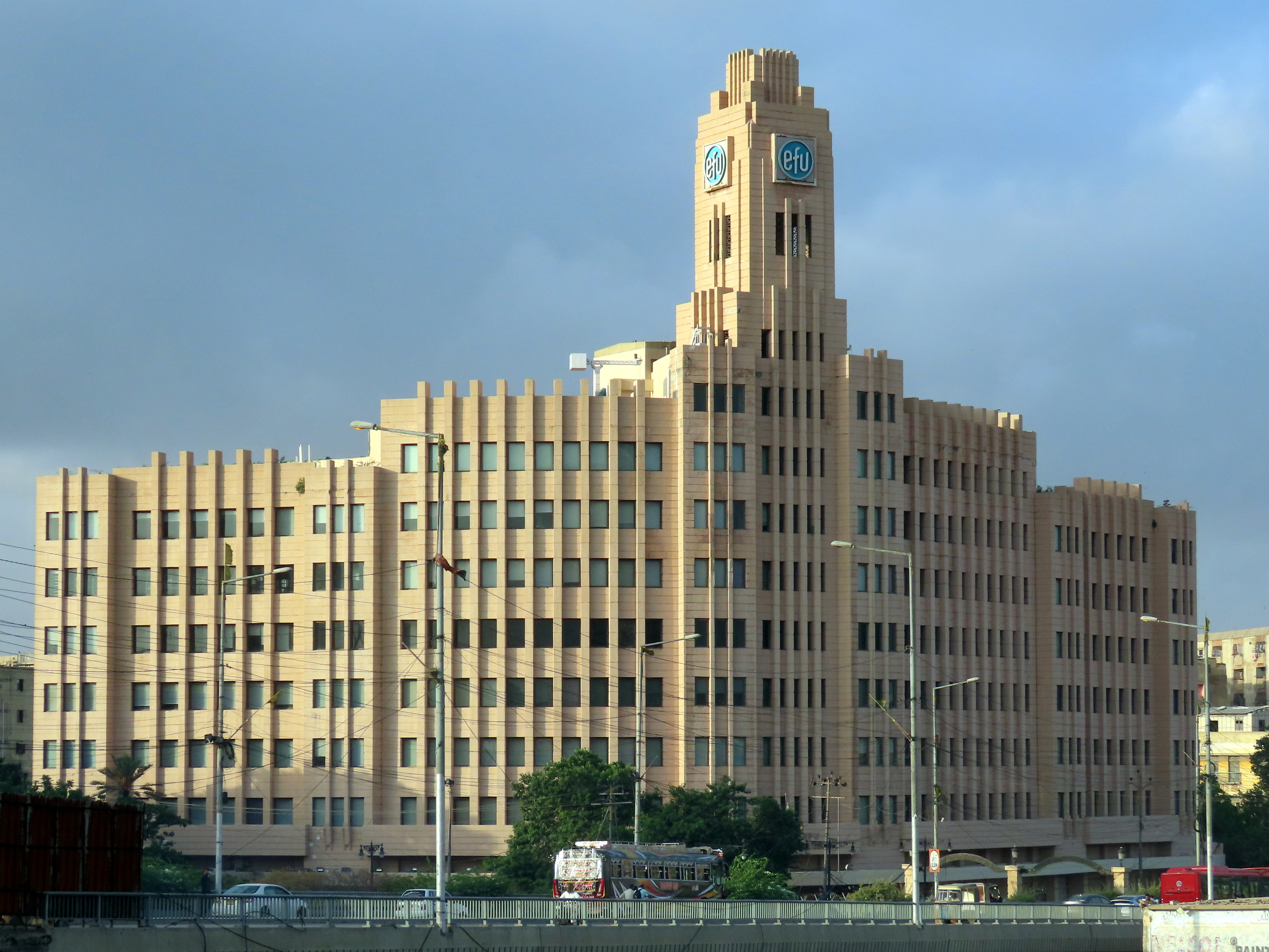
- Headquarters of EFU Life and General Insurance in Karachi
- Trade name: EFU General Insurance Limited; EFU Life Assurance Limited
- Traded as: PSX: EFUG; PSX: EFUL; KSE 100 component
- Industry: Insurance
- Founded: 1932
- Headquarters: Karachi, Pakistan
- Key people: Rafique R. Bhimjee (chairman); Taher G. Sachak (vice chairman); Mohammed Ali Ahmed (CEO)
- Products: Unit-Linked, Conventional and Group Products
- Subsidiaries: EFU General Insurance Limited; EFU Life Assurance Limited; EFU Health Insurance Limited
- Website: efuinsurance.com

EFU Insurance, originally Eastern Federal Union Insurance Company Limited, is a Pakistan based insurance company. It was the first insurance company in India founded in 1932, owned by the Muslims based in Calcutta.

After the partition of India, the company moved to Pakistan and operated in East Pakistan and West Pakistan. The company ceased to exist in East Pakistan after 1971.

== History ==
First meeting of the founders and sponsors of the Eastern Federal Union Insurance Co. Ltd (1931 in London). L-R: Abdur Rahman Siddiqui, Partner Haira Trading Co., B.M. Collins of B.M. Collins & Co. Ltd., London; C.H. Faloon, General Manager, Atlas Assurance Company, Khondker Fazle Haider, Partner Haira Trading Co., London.

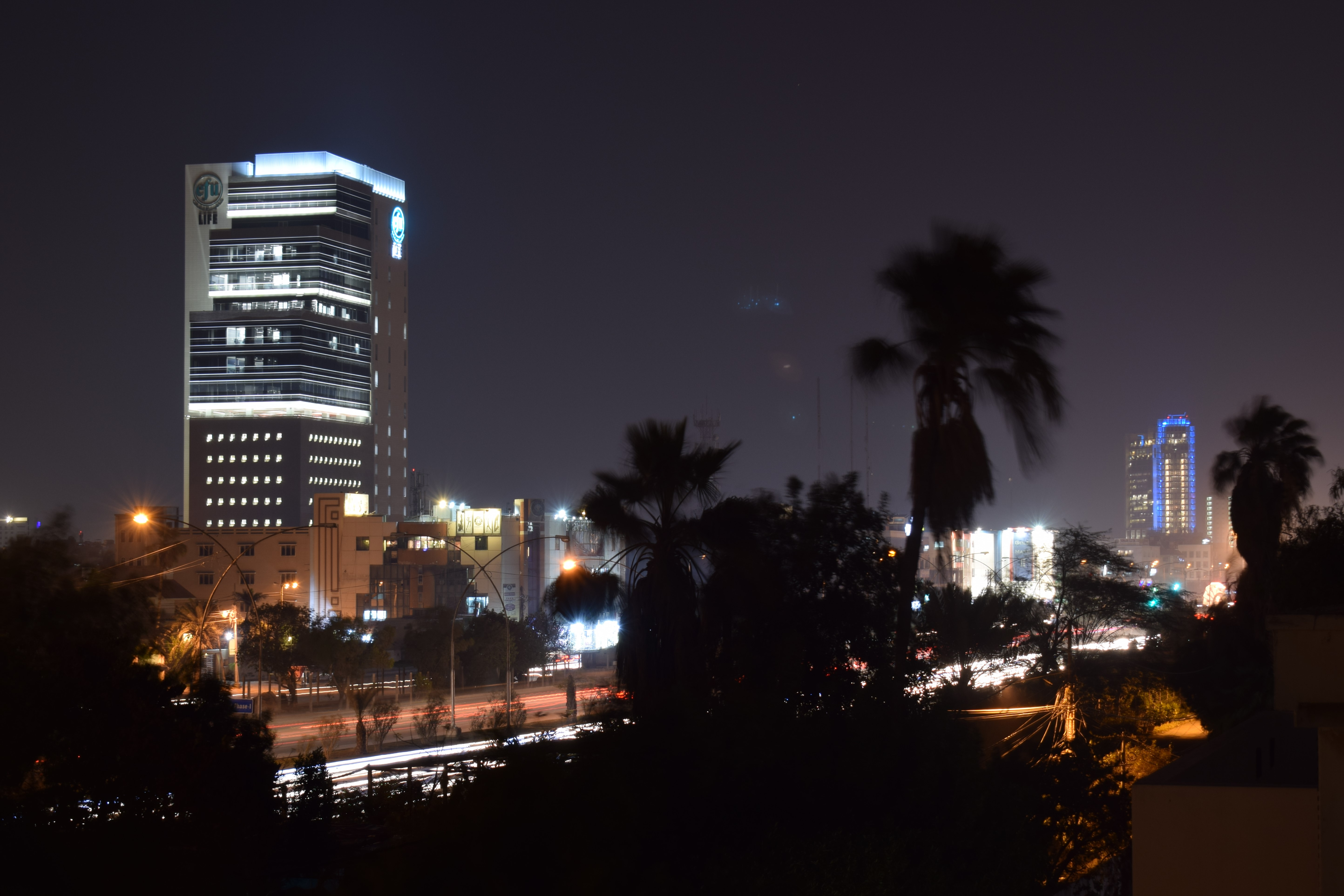
Night View of EFU Life Building

It was the first insurance company in India owned and run by Muslims targeted for the Muslim populace. Abdur Rahman Siddiqui of Surat and Khonkar Fazle Haider of Murshidabad district were the company's founders. Siddiqui and Haider executed a “memorandum of understanding” in 1931 with one of leading British insurance companies, the “Atlas” and Messrs. B.M. Collins, Lloyds brokers. The company was incorporated on 2 September 1932 in Calcutta with E.N. Menhinick, a senior manager of Atlas as the first chief executive officer of the company.The main objective of the company was to provide “insurance service to the community and also to produce competent Muslim insurance personnel.” Aga Khan III and Hamidullah Khan (last Nawab of Bhopal) became the “Patrons” of the new company. Malik Ghulam Muhammad helped to arrange substantial subscriptions from the State of Hyderabad and State and Bhopal. Sir Victor Sassoon became the largest foreign shareholder and Mirza Ahmad Ispahani bought most of the shares of the EFU.

The company officially started as a general insurance company. In 1936, life business of the company started with a paid-for business of about Rs. 5.0 million. By 1946 the company started to move ahead steadily but major upheaval of the century had occurred, in which Muslims all over the sub-continent sustained immense loss, both of life and property after creation of Pakistan. The EFU management transferred its registered office to Chittagong, East Pakistan before partition. The company completed a new Life Business of Rs. 4.5 million by 1947 and during 1948 transacted a total business of Rs. 13.9 million.

The EFU shifted its head office to Karachi, West Pakistan in May 1950. In 1952, the company hired Khuda Buksh, an inspector from Oriental Governmental Security Life Assurance, Calcutta, as life manager for East Pakistan. Buksh, introduced a system of training classes and expanded the entire field organization on scientific lines. The company thereafter continued showing tremendous upward trend in its paid-for business from 25 million in 1953 to 76.7 million in 1960. During the same period the premium income of the company went up from Rs. 3.3 million to Rs. 11.9 million. In 1960, the company almost reached the door of bankruptcy due to bad underwriting against marine hull business on overseas account. Abbas Khaleeli, a former bureaucrat and Roshen Ali Bhimjee, owner of Insurance Agency Pak Underwriters were credited for averting the bankruptcy. Subsequently, Mirza Ahmad Ispahani disinvested his shares and major shares were taken by the “Habib family”, ARAG Limited and rest was distributed to the public.

Abbas Khaleeli and Roshen Ali Bhimjee officially took over the company on 1 January 1961. Khuda Buksh worked for the company as life manager, deputy life manager and general manager from 1960 to April 1969. He was recognized as the “driving force” who “had successfully helped to grow the company into the leading and dominating position” in the country. During the 1960s, EFU became the largest company in the Afro-Asian countries excluding Japan. In March 1971, the Bangladesh War of Liberation led to creation of modern Bangladesh in December 1971 when the EFU lost its eastern division.

Bangladesh nationalized all Pakistan based and local life insurance companies in August 1972. In Pakistan, after 1972 the EFU operated solely as a general Insurance company. In 1992, the Government of Pakistan opened up life insurance to the private sector and EFU was reorganized and EFU Life Assurance Ltd. was incorporated in 1992 as the first private sector life insurance company.

In 1992, the Government of Pakistan opened up life insurance to the private sector and EFU Life Assurance Ltd. was incorporated in 1992 as the first private sector life insurance company. EFU commenced writing group life insurance business in the same year, individual life business in 1994 and is today the largest life insurance company in the private sector in the country.

== Subsidiaries ==
It comprises the following three companies:

- EFU General Insurance Limited
- EFU Life Assurance Limited
- EFU Health Insurance Limited

== EFU House ==
The EFU House was acquired by the company in 2002. The former name of the building is Qamar House.
