= Bangladesh Public Administration Training Centre =

Public administration school in Savar, Bangladesh

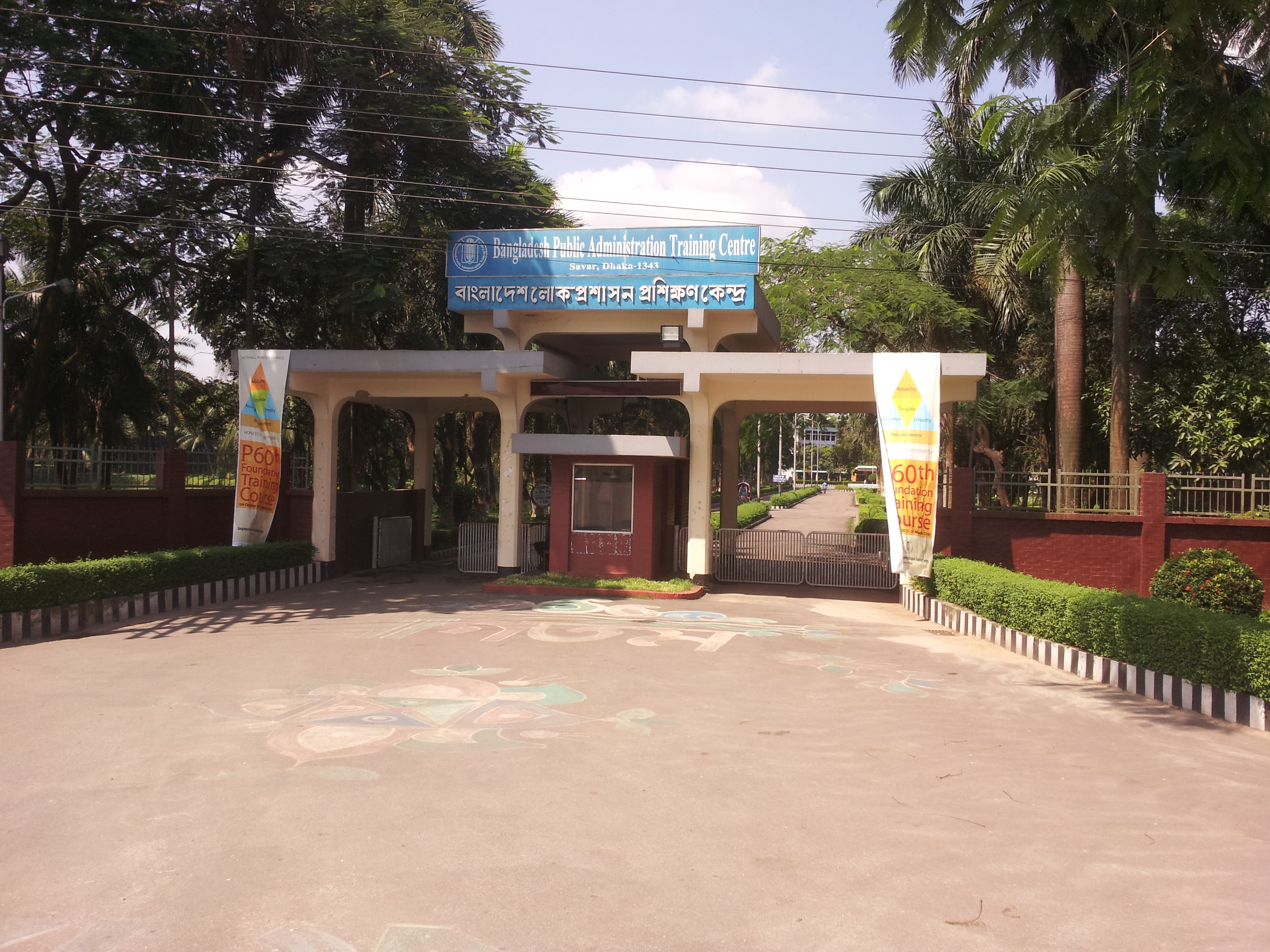
- Entrance of Bangladesh Public Administration Training Centre (BPATC)
- Formation: 1984
- Headquarters: Savar, Bangladesh
- Region served: Bangladesh
- Official language: Bengali
- Rector (Secretary): Sayeed Mahbub Khan
- Website: bpatc.portal.gov.bd

Bangladesh Public Administration Training Centre (BPATC) is a training institute for the public sector. It was founded in 1984, and is situated in Savar, Dhaka District. The premises have teaching facilities, quarters for the officers, a mosque, and a lake. Sayeed Mahbub Khan is the rector of the Bangladesh Public Administration Training Centre.

== History ==
Bangladesh Public Administration Training Centre was established in 1984. The Bangladesh Public Administration Training Centre was established by merging the Bangladesh Administrative Staff College, National Institute of Public Administration, Civil Officers' Training Academy, and the Staff Training Institute. The foundation stone of the centre was laid in December 1981, and the centre became operational on 28 April 1984, as an autonomous body with a rector as its head who is a senior secretary to the government.

The centre has four division units based in Chittagong Division, Dhaka Division, Rajshahi Division, and Khulna Division.

In February 2009, the Bangladesh Public Administration Training Centre organized a seminar on 'Improving public services through total quality management' with support from the Japan International Cooperation Agency. At the silver jubilee celebration of the Bangladesh Public Administration Training Centre, Prime Minister Sheikh Hasina reminded the bureaucrats that they were servants of the public and not masters.

In 2010, the Bangladesh Supreme Court announced plans to train judges of lower courts in the Bangladesh Public Administration Training Centre and the Bangladesh Military Academy.

In September 2020, Prime Minister Sheikh Hasina inaugurated a 20-story building of the Bangladesh Public Administration Training Centre in Savar.

== Administration ==
The rector (normally the rank of a senior secretary) is the head of the training institution, assisted by the MDS (rank of senior joint secretary/additional secretary). The rector also chairs the governing body of the BPATC School and College, a secondary school located within the precincts of BPATC.

The board of governors of the Bangladesh Public Administration Training Centre is under the direction of a cabinet minister.

== List of rectors ==
Name	Start date	End date	Reference
Ramendra Nath Biswas	3 January 2022	31 December 2022	
Md. Monjur Hossain	25 May 2021	2 January 2022	
Md. Rakib Hossain	29 July 2019	24 May 2021	
M. Aslam Alam	4 May 2017	28 July 2019	
A. L. M. Abdur Rahman	22 February 2016	3 March 2017	
A. K. M. Abdul Awal Majumder	10 December 2014	28 February 2016	
Khandker Md. Iftekhar Haider	17 February 2014	9 December 2014	
A. Z. M. Shafiqul Alam	29 March 2011	17 February 2014	
Mesbaul Alam	26 October 2010	15 November 2010	
Md. Delwar Hossain	1 July 2009	20 February 2011	
Md Abdus Salam Khan	3 September 2008	24 May 2009	
Abu Md. Maniruzzaman Khan	22 January 2007	2 September 2008	
Md. Abdus Salam Khan	5 December 2005	22 January 2007	
Ahbab Ahmed	1 November 2003	31 October 2005	
Kamal Uddin Siddiqui	23 June 2002	1 November 2003	
Kshanada Mohan Das	21 March 2001	19 November 2001	
Kazi Md. Monzur-I-Mowla	17 June 1991	1 July 1995	
Ekram Hossain	1 August 1990	15 January 1991	
A. Z. M. Shamsul Alam	11 January 1990	31 July 1990	
Mohammad Siddiqur Rahman	16 August 1989	9 January 1990	
Nazrul Islam	5 July 1989	15 August 1989	
A. M. Anisuzzaman	7 February 1988	2 July 1989	
A. K. M. Hedayetul Huq	9 October 1985	25 January 1988	
Sheikh Maqsood Ali	28 April 1984	10 August 1985	

== Board of governors ==
- Farhad Hossain
- Md. Mahbub Hossain
- Mohammad Mezbah Uddin Chowdhury
- Fatima Yasmin
- Md. Abu Bakar Siddique
- Md. Ashraf Uddin
- Md Nurul Alam
- Ibne Fazal Shayekhuzzaman
- Md. Jashim Uddin
- Ferdous Arfina Osman
