= Ferdous Arfina Osman =

Ferdous Arfina Osman is a professor and former chairperson of the department of public administration at the University of Dhaka. She is a member of the Local Government Reform Commission of the Muhammad Yunus led interim government.

== Early life ==
Osman completed her bachelor's degree and masters in public administration at the University of Dhaka in 1992 and 1993 respectively. She completed her PhD at the University of Manchester in 1999.

== Career ==
Osman completed her postdoc research at the Johns Hopkins University in public policy in 2015. She is a director of the Centre for Advanced Research in Social Sciences. She is a "friend" of the Development Research Initiative.

Following the fall of the Sheikh Hasina led Awami League government, Osman was appointed a member of the Local Government Reform Commission. The eight member commission is led by Tofail Ahmed.

== Bibliography ==
- Decentralization and Localization in Bangladesh - An Analysis of Functional Assignments in Health and Education in Bangladesh: The Role of Local Governments and Local Administration, Component 1.
- Policy Making in Bangladesh: A Study of the Health Policy Process
- External inducement, internal support: Explaining the health sector policy gains in Bangladesh (chapter) in the Public Policy and Governance in Bangladesh book by Nizam Ahmed.
