= Khandker Nurul Habib =

Canadian transportation engineering and planning researcher

- Education: Bangladesh University of Engineering and Technology; University of Toronto
- Known for: transportation engineering and planning
- Website: www.khandkernurulhabib.com

Khandker Nurul Habib is a Bangladeshi-Canadian engineer and academic. He was born in Narayanganj, Bangladesh, and later moved to Canada. He is the 5th of 6 children of Abdur Razzaque Khandker and Salma Khandker. Currently, he is a tenured Full Professor at the University of Toronto's Department of Civil & Mineral Engineering. He was also the endowed 'Percy Edward Hart Professor':2019-2022 at the University of Toronto. Professor Khandker Nurul Habib completed his Ph.D. in Civil Engineering at the University of Toronto ( CIV Ph.D. 0T7 ). After finishing his Ph.D., he joined the University of Alberta as an assistant professor in civil engineering. He worked for the University of Alberta from 2008 to 2010 and was responsible for rebuilding the graduate program in transportation engineering. He moved to Toronto to join his alma mater in 2010. He also served his first alma mater, the Bangladesh University of Engineering and Technology (BUET), for 3 years between 2000 and 2003 as a lecturer and an assistant professor of civil engineering. Currently, he is leading the research programs in sustainable transportation planning, demand modeling, and travel survey methods (the Travel Demand Modelling Group: TDMG) at the University of Toronto Transportation Research Institute (UTTRI) civil engineering department. Professor Nurul Habib has extensive research and consulting experience in transportation engineering and planning. His overall research focus is the sustainable transportation planning and policy development. For this, he recognizes that we need a clear understanding of peoples' transportation behavior and appropriate methodology for capturing such behavior while forecasting demand for transportation infrastructure or results of any transportation and land use policies. He is the current chair (2021–2024) of the Standing Committee on Traveler Behavior and Values (AEP30) of the Transportation Research Board (TRB), National Academies of Science, Engineering and Medicine (NASEM), USA. and specializes in transportation engineering and planning.

== Selected publications ==
- El-Assi, Wafic; Salah Mahmoud, Mohamed; Nurul Habib, Khandker (16 December 2015). "Effects of built environment and weather on bike sharing demand: a station level analysis of commercial bike sharing in Toronto". Transportation. 44 (3): 589–613. doi:10.1007/s11116-015-9669-z. ISSN 0049-4488. S2CID 254940249.
- Costain, Cindy; Ardron, Carolyn; Habib, Khandker Nurul (March 2012). "Synopsis of users' behaviour of a carsharing program: A case study in Toronto". Transportation Research Part A: Policy and Practice. 46 (3): 421–434. Bibcode:2012TRPA...46..421C. doi:10.1016/j.tra.2011.11.005. ISSN 0965-8564.
- Roorda, Matthew J.; Miller, Eric J.; Habib, Khandker M.N. (February 2008). "Validation of TASHA: A 24-h activity scheduling microsimulation model". Transportation Research Part A: Policy and Practice. 42 (2): 360–375. Bibcode:2008TRPA...42..360R. doi:10.1016/j.tra.2007.10.004. hdl:1807/73956. ISSN 0965-8564.
