= Insurance Development and Regulatory Authority of Bangladesh =

- Abbreviation: IDRA
- Type: GO
- Headquarters: Sadharan Bima Corporation Tower (8th floor), 37/A, Dilkusha Commercial Area, Motijheel, Dhaka -1000, Bangladesh
- Website: idra.org.bd

The Insurance Development and Regulatory Authority of Bangladesh (IDRA) is the sole government body responsible for regulating and developing the insurance sector of Bangladesh. It has been operating since 2010.

== History ==
The Parliament of Bangladesh on 3 March 2010 has passed two insurance laws in a bid to further strengthen the regulatory framework for the insurance industry. The new laws came into effect on 18 March 2010, are the Insurance Act 2010 and IDRA Act 2010.

A total of 81 insurance companies have been operating in the country. The companies are to be regulated under comprehensive laws and guidelines and to be supervised by IDRA. The IDRA Act 2010 has paved the way for better regulation of the sector by reducing business risks, and by harmonizing local and international insurance laws for the Economy of Bangladesh. IDRA attempts to protect the interest of insurance policyholders, beneficiaries and ensuring stability of the insurance sector. Two state-owned insurers -Sadharan Bima Corporation (SBC) and Jiban Bima Corporation (JBC) are also regulated by IDRA.

== List of chairmen (Former and Present) ==
The IDRA Chairpersons
Serial No.	Name	Date of Assumption	Date of Demitting Office	Reference
1	M. Shefaque Ahmed	27 January 2011	26 January 2014	[3]
2	Md. Fazlul Karim	29 January 2014	03 March 2014	[3]
3	Md. Quddus Khan	04 March 2014	08 April 2014	[3]
4	M. Shefaque Ahmed	09 April 2014	08 April 2017	[3]
5	Gokul Chand Das	09 April 2017	22 August 2017	[3]
6	Md. Shafiqur Rahman Patwari	23 August 2017	22 August 2020	[3]
7	M. Mosharraf Hossain	26 August 2020	26 September 2020	[3]
8	M. Mosharraf Hossain	27 September 2020	14 June 2022	[3]
9	Mohammad Jainul Bari	16 June 2022	08 September 2024	[3]
10	Mohammad Aslam Alam	09 September 2024	15 June 2026	[3]
11	Mir Nadia Nivin	16 June 2026	Incumbent	[3]

== Organizational structure ==
- Mir Nadia Nivin - Chairman
- Md Fazlul Haque - Member (Admin Affairs)
- Ms Tanjina Ismail - Member (Legal Affairs)
- Md. Apel Mahmud ACII (UK) - Member (Life)
- Mohammad Abu Bakar Siddique - Member (Non-life)

== See also ==
- List of Insurance Companies in Bangladesh
- List of financial supervisory authorities by country
