= Bangladesh Civil Service Administration Academy =

Government educational institute in Dhaka

- Emblem of Bangladesh Civil Service Administration
- Formation: 1973
- Headquarters: Dhaka, Bangladesh
- Location: Shahbag, Dhaka, Bangladesh
- Region served: Bangladesh
- Official language: Bengali
- Rector (Secretary): Dr. Md. Omar Faruque
- Staff: 178
- Website: Bangladesh Civil Service Administration Academy

Bangladesh Civil Service Administration Academy is a special government educational institute that provides training on law and administration to civil servants in Bangladesh. The academy is located in Shahbag, Dhaka, Bangladesh.

== History ==
Bangladesh Civil Service Administration Academy was established on 21 October 1987 to provide training Bangladesh Civil Service cadets. The building it occupies was the Gazetted Officers' Training Academy before 1971 when Bangladesh was part of Pakistan. After Independence it became the Civil Officers' Training Academy. Students at the academy come after completing their compulsory courses at the Bangladesh Public Administration Training Centre. From 1989 to 1996, BCS foreign service cadets were trained here.
