= Dilkusha Bhulbhulaiya Garden Tower =

Historic garden tower and maze in Dhaka, Bangladesh

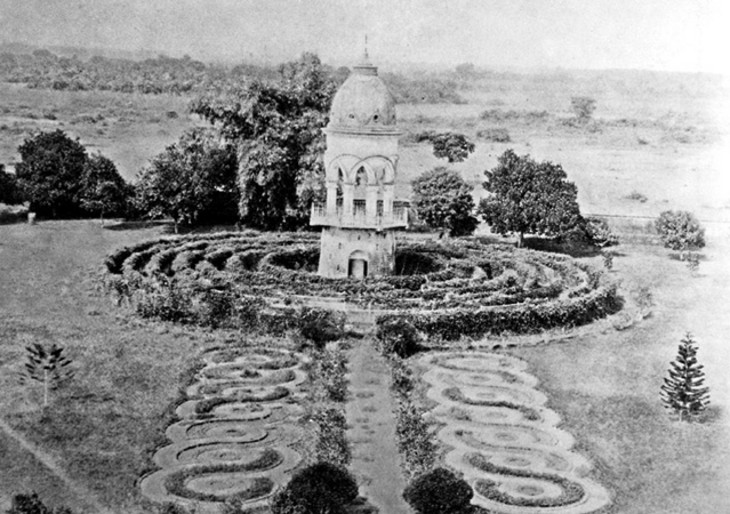
- The tower of the Dilkusha Bhulbhulaiya Garden in 1880
- Interactive map of Dilkusha Bhulbhulaiya Garden Tower
- Location: Dilkusha Garden, Dhaka
- Coordinates: 23°43′38″N 90°25′07″E
- Built: 1866

The Dilkusha Bhulbhulaiya Garden Tower (Bengali: দিলকুশা ভুলভুলাইয়া গার্ডেন টাওয়ার) is a historic garden tower located within the former Dilkusha Garden in Dhaka, Bangladesh. The site, originally developed in the 19th century by the Nawab family of Dhaka, featured a distinctive labyrinth or bhulbhulaiya of trees planted around the central tower. It served as a leisure and recreation spot where the Nawab family and guests played hide-and-seek.

== History ==
The Dilkusha Garden was purchased in 1866 by Khwaja Abdul Ghani from a European owner, E. F. Smith. The Nawab commissioned the development of the garden house as a residence and leisure retreat for his family, particularly for his son, Khwaja Ahsanullah. Within the estate grounds, a central tower was erected and encircled by trees planted in concentric patterns to form a maze.

== Current condition ==
Today, little remains of the original maze or the tower. The tower's exact remnants are believed to be lost or buried under later constructions.

== See also ==
- Ahsan Manzil
- Nawab of Dhaka
- Old Dhaka
