= Ministry of Public Administration =

Government ministry of Bangladesh

- জনপ্রশাসন মন্ত্রণালয়
- Government Seal of Bangladesh

Ministry overview
- Formed: 26 March 1971; 55 years ago
- Jurisdiction: Government of Bangladesh
- Headquarters: Bangladesh Secretariat, Dhaka
- Annual budget: ৳5067 crore (US$410 million) (2026-2027)
- Minister of State responsible: Md Abdul Bari
- Ministry executive: Md. Ehsanul Haque, Senior Secretary
- Child agencies: Bangladesh Employees Welfare Board; Bangladesh Public Administration Training Centre; Bangladesh Public Service Commission; Bangladesh Civil Service Administration Academy; BIAM Foundation; Department of Printing and Publications; Government Transport Directorate
- Website: mopa.gov.bd

The Ministry of Public Administration (Bengali: জনপ্রশাসন মন্ত্রণালয়, romanized: Jônôprôśāśôn Montronaloy; abbreviated as MoPA) is a ministry of the Government of Bangladesh responsible for the management, regulation, and development of the public administration and civil service of the country.

== Directorate ==
- Bangladesh Employees Welfare Board (BKKB)
- Bangladesh Public Administration Training Centre (BPATC)
- Bangladesh Public Service Commission
- Bangladesh Civil Service Administration Academy
- BIAM Foundation
- Department of Printing and Publications
- Government Transport Directorate
