= Ispahani family =

Perso-Bengali business family

- Current region: Bangladesh, United Kingdom, Pakistan
- Earlier spellings: Isfahani (original Persian)
- Etymology: of Isfahan
- Origin: Isfahan
- Members: Mirza Ahmad Ispahani; Mirza Mehdy Ispahani; Mirza Ali Behrouze Ispahani Mirza Salman Ispahani; Mirza Abol Hassan Ispahani
- Traditions: Shia Islam
- Heirlooms: M. M. Ispahani Limited
- Estate: Ispahani Colony (Dhaka)

The Ispahani family, also known as the House of Ispahani, are a Perso-Bengali business family. In Bangladesh, they own and manage M. M. Ispahani Limited, one of the country's leading conglomerates. Originally hailing from Isfahan, Iran, the family have been settled in the Indian subcontinent for more than two centuries.

== History ==
Mirza Abu Talib Ispahani visited England in 1799, and the family have maintained a presence and properties in Richmond, London. In 1820, Mohammed Hashim (1789–1850) moved from Isfahan in Qajar, Iran to Bombay and established the Ispahani Group business. In the 1830s, the business extended to Calcutta in Bengal. Hashim was notable as the first Muslim of the Assam Tea Company's Calcutta Committee. The family business also expanded from Madras in the south and Burma in the east. Many of their descendants were educated at English private schools and top universities in UK.

Hashim's grandson, Mirza Mehdy (1841–1913) made Madras as the business's headquarters. He spent twelve years in Cairo, Egypt trading Indian produce such as leather, tea, turmeric, tamarind and peanuts amongst others. In 1888, he established a branch in Dacca.

Mirza Mohamed Ispahani was the son of Mehdy and was born in 1871. Mohamed established the Calcutta office of M.M Ispahani & Sons in 1900. In the same year, a branch office was also established in London. Mohammed died in 1925.

Mirza Ahmad Ispahani (1898–1986), the eldest son, joined the partnership in 1918. He established the private limited company, M.M. Ispahani Limited in 1934 in Calcutta along with his younger brothers Abul Hassan Isphani and Mirza Mahmood Ispahani.

The final move of headquarters was made in 1947 with the shifting of the corporate headquarters to Chittagong where it stands today. The company continued to operate as a foreign company in Calcutta until 1965 when its operations in India were taken over by the Government of India. It was under the visionary leadership of Ahmad that the company rapidly expanded its business. By 1947, M.M Ispahani Limited was a leading exporter in shellac, kapok, hessian, jute bags, tea and chemicals. In 1948, Mirza Ahmad Ispahani left the family business for public service. When the family moved to East Pakistan after the Partition of India, they purchased a vast swathe of land in Dhaka's Maghbazar area. The area was named the Ispahani Colony and continues to serve as the family's estate in Dhaka.

Mirza Ahmad Ispahani's son, Mirza Mehdy Ispahani (1923–2004) was made chairman of M.M. Ispahani Limited in 1949 and remained in that post until he died, when his son Mirza Ali Behrouze Ispahani was elected chairperson of M.M. Ispahani Limited.

The company now has corporate offices in Chittagong, Dhaka and Khulna where it employs over 20,000 people in many sectors such as tea, textile, real estate, crisps, poultry, shipping and internet services.

== Family members ==
- Mirza Mehdy Ispahani (1841–1913): Mehdy Ispahani was the grandson of Haji Muhammad Hashem (the patriarch of the House of Ispahani), who moved from Isfahan, Iran to Mumbai in 1820. Mehdy Ispahani established the company's corporate headquarters in Madras from Mumbai. Prior to that he spent twelve years in Cairo trading in leather, tea, turmeric, tamarind, peanuts and other Indian products. He also established a branch in Dhaka in 1888.
  - Mirza Mohammad Ispahani (1871–1925): In 1900, Mohammad Ispahani established M.M Ispahani & Sons in Calcutta and also opened a branch office in London. His three sons Mirza Ahmad Ispahani, Mirza Abul Hassan Isphani, and Mirza Mahmood Ispahani established the private limited company M. M. Ispahani Limited in the year 1934.
    - Mirza Ahmad Ispahani (1898–1986): Mirza Ahmad was born in Rangoon, Burma in 1898 and was made a junior partner after joining the family firm. After his father's death in 1925, he became the senior partner. He established M. M. Ispahani Limited with his two younger brothers. Ahmad Ispahani was a close associate of Sheikh Mujibur Rahman, Muhammad Ali Jinnah, the Raja of Mahmoodabad, and Ziaur Rahman. He was one of the earliest supporters of the All-India Muslim League and one of the most prominent leaders of the Pakistan Movement. In October 1946, Ispahani established Orient Airways (the predecessor of PIA) along with Adamjee Haji Dawood in Calcutta. At the personal request of Jinnah, the two industrialists also established the Muslim Commercial Bank and Eastern Federal Insurance Company. He shifted the corporate headquarters of M.M. Ispahani to Chittagong in 1947. He retired in 1948 and decided to join in public service. After the Bangladesh Liberation War, his properties were nationalized under the Enemy Property Act. Ahmad Ispahani personally went to meet Sheikh Mujibur Rahman and requested that his properties be denationalized. Mujib had the law specially changed for Ahmad Ispahani and handed all his properties back to him. When Ziaur Rahman became the president, he requested that Ahmad Ispahani become the chairman of Biman, because of his expertise in the aviation industry. However, he politely turned down the offer. Ahmad Ispahani died in Dhaka in 1986.
      - Mirza Mehdy (Sadri) Ispahani (1923–2004): Sadri was made the chairman of M. M. Ispahani Limited in 1949 and remained in that post until his death. He served as the chairman of the Pakistan Jute Mills Association. He co-founded with his father many institutions such as the Islamia Eye Hospital, M.A Ispahani Institute of Ophthalmology, Ispahani Public School and College, Mirza Ahmed Smrity Biddalaya, CJM High School, Waisia Darassuna Dakhil Madrassah, Mirza Ahmed High School, Victory High School, Comilla Public School and College, Ispahani Girls School and College (Dhaka), Siddeshwari (University) College. Sadri resided in the Ispahani Colony in Dhaka, but died in Bangkok in 2004 at the age of 81. He left behind his wife, Razia Ispahani, 5 sons, and 3 daughters. Razia (Sultani) Ispahani died in London in 2017 at the age of 93.
        - Mirza Ali Behrouze Ispahani (1950–2017): Behrouze Ispahani completed his education in Dhaka from St Joseph Higher Secondary School. Behrouze served as the chairman of M. M. Ispahani Limited from 2004 until his death. He was also the managing director of International Publications Limited (the holding company of The Financial Express), and a trustee of the Independent University, Bangladesh. He died in Dhaka in 2017 from a heart-attack and diabetic complications. His death was condoled by Prime Minister Sheikh Hasina. He was married to Zahida Ispahani.
        - Mirza Salman Ispahani: Salman Ispahani became the chairman of M. M. Ispahani Limited after the demise of his elder brother, Behrouze. Salman was elected the chairman of the International Cotton Association for 2017–18. He was the first Bangladeshi and first cotton spinner/buyer to be elected the president of this association. Salman was elected to the ICA Board of Directors in 2013. He is the former Chairman of the Tea Traders Association of Bangladesh, former chairman of the Chittagong Stock Exchange and was a member of the Bangladesh Cricket Board. He is also the honorary consul of Italy in Chittagong. Salman is also an avid golf player, playing in many national tournaments and hosts the annual Ispahani Cup golf tournament.
        - Mirza Shakir Ispahani: Shakir Ispahani completed his education in England, where he obtained a law degree from the University of Kent, and completed an LLM from the University of Cambridge. He was called to the Bar of England and Wales (Lincoln's Inn) in 1984. Shakir is currently managing director of M. M. Ispahani Limited. He also serves as the honorary consul of Germany in Chittagong.
        - Mirza Sajid Ispahani: Sajid Ispahani is a Chartered Accountant. He retired in 2019 but remains Chairman of Ispahani Foods Limited as well as a Director of M. M. Ispahani Limited. Sajid is also a bridge player, who served as the captain of the national bridge team representing Bangladesh in international tournaments. He also has 2 sons, Ali and Hasan, who have both worked for M. M. Ispahani Limited.
        - Mirza Imran Ispahani: Imran Ispahani is a son of Sadri Ispahani and Sultani Ispahani. He is primarily based in the UK. He is involved in the I.T industry and lives in Richmond.
        - Farah Khanum Ispahani: One of the daughters of Sadri Ispahani and Sultani Ispahani. She, like her elder brothers was educated in London where she went to London University's School of African & Oriental Studies to study law. Subsequent to obtaining her degree, joined Freshfields in 1983, a leading firm of solicitors in London. In 1996 she was promoted to partner based in the UK, and now heads the corporate mergers and acquisitions team of Freshfields Bruckhaus Deringer.
    - Mirza Abul Hassan Ispahani (1902–1981): Mirza Abul Hassan (MAH) Ispahani was a son of Mirza Mohammad Ispahani. He completed his education from the St John's College, Cambridge, where obtained a Bar-at-Law in 1924. MAH was one of the closest associates of Muhammad Ali Jinnah (he is popularly known as the Quaid's Lieutenant). He met Jinnah at Cambridge in 1920 and developed a friendship with him. In 1937, at the request of Jinnah, MAH joined the Bengal Provincial Muslim League and became its joint secretary. He was elected to the Bengal Legislative Assembly from the party that same year. MAH was present in the 1941 All-India Muslim League session held in Madras, where the Lahore Resolution was incorporated into the party's charter. He served as the Deputy Mayor for Calcutta from 1941 to 1942 and the President of Muslim Chamber of Commerce, Calcutta from 1945 to 1947. In 1946, he was elected as a member of the Indian Constituent Assembly. After the independence of Pakistan he served as the first Pakistani ambassador to the United States. His residence in Washington, D.C. was donated to the Pakistani embassy, and is still used as the official residence of the Pakistani ambassador to the USA. MAH also served as the high commissioner to the UK from 1952 to 1954. From 1954 to 1955 he served as the Federal Minister for Industries and Commerce. He served in his final diplomatic position from 1973 to 1974 as the Pakistani ambassador to Afghanistan, after which he retired from public work and became a writer. MAH was married to Ameneh Sultan and also to Begum Ghamar Ispahani, an Iranian citizen. She was the daughter of an Iranian diplomat. Ghamar Ispahani was a social worker who was a recipient of Pakistan's Nishan-e-Imtiaz and Italy's Cavalleri award. They were married during MAH's tenure as the Pakistani High Commissioner to the United Kingdom. As a result of this marriage, MAH had to resign from his diplomatic post because according to diplomatic law, a running diplomat couldn't be married to a foreigner. Ghamar Ispahani also served as a director of the EFU Life Insurance Company alongside her step-son Isky Ispahani, until 1989. She also established a girl's orphanage in Karachi. She died in 2007 at the age of 90.
      - Mirza Mohammad (Isky) Ispahani (1930-2013): Isky Ispahani was born in Calcutta in 1930 and completed his education from the University of Cambridge. Isky Ispahani was initially based in East Pakistan, where he had successfully established his business. However, after the Bangladesh Liberation War, his assets were nationalized. After he lost his assets in East Pakistan, the Shah of Iran personally requested him to establish a jute mill in Iran. Isky Ispahani successfully established and administered the mill until that was also lost during the aftermath of the Islamic Revolution. After that he permanently resettled in Karachi, where he was the head of the Pakistani branch of the Ispahani family business. He served as a director of the EFU Life Insurance Company alongside his step-mother, Begum Ghamar Ispahani, until 1989. Isky Ispahani was married to Akhtar Ispahani (a journalist), with whom he had four children (Iraj, Farahnaz, Mahnaz, and Lalehnaz). In his later years, after his divorce with Akhtar Ispahani, he married Shobha Ispahani. He died in Karachi in 2013. His ex-wife, Akhtar, died in June 2020 in her early 80's. She died alone in her house at Karachi as all four of her children were abroad and unable to return to Pakistan due to international travel restrictions because of the COVID-19 pandemic.
        - Mirza Iraj Ispahani (b. 1960): Iraj Ispahani is the chief executive of Ispahani Advisory,Ispahani Advisory – Since 1820 a London-based firm which specialized in advising company leaders on strategic management. He graduated from the University of London in politics and history and then earned an MPhil in international relations from the University of Cambridge. He joined J.P. Morgan & Co. as a trainee in New York but returned to London a year later and served as a vice-president at J.P. Morgan. Iraj replaced his father, Isky Ispahani, in the board of M.M. Ispahani in 2011. He is married to Eva-Kristiina Lindholm (who was also a J. P. Morgan banker) since 1994, with whom he has two children. They all reside in London. Iraj is also the deputy chairman of Shakespeare's Globe Theatre in London.
        - Farahnaz Ispahani (b. 1963): Farahnaz Ispahani is a Pakistani politician, author, and human rights lawyer. She lived in London and completed her education from Wellesley College in 1985. She served as a member of the National Assembly of Pakistan from 2008 to 2012 from the PPP. She also served as the media advisor to President Asif Ali Zardari before her seat was terminated due to her holding dual nationality. Farahnaz is also a journalist and writer. She has worked with CNN, MSNBC, ABC News, and also authored a book called Purifying the Land of the Pure: Pakistan's Religious Minorities, which focused on the persecution of minorities in Pakistan. She is married to Husain Haqqani, the former Pakistani ambassador to the United States and Sri Lanka.
        - Mahnaz Ispahani: Mahnaz is a daughter of Isky Ispahani and Akhtar Ispahani. She was raised in Bangladesh but studied English literature and political science in Massachusetts. She is an author, jewelry collector, and independent scholar specializing in South Asian affairs. She was a senior fellow for South and West Asia at the Council on Foreign Relations. She has authored several books on international relations. Mahnaz spent 25 years working as a global foreign policy expert, which included a 10-year tenure at the Ford Foundation. She launched a jewelry gallery in Midtown Manhattan in 2012 called Mahnaz Collection.
        - Lalehnaz Ispahani: Lalehnaz Ispahani is a lawyer and advocate for democracy and human rights issues. She obtained her bachelor's degree from Harvard College and her law degree from the Georgetown University Law Center. Lalehnaz served as a senior policy counsel at the American Civil Liberties Union working on racial justice and human rights for 6 years. She is currently the co-director of the Open Society Foundations-U.S. She married Tapio Vaskio in 2005, the co-founder and managing director of Enterprise Research Group. He graduated from the University of Helsinki and obtained a master's degree in international relations from Columbia University. Laleh and Tapio have a 15-year-old daughter named Ameneh.
      - Mirza Zia Ispahani: Zia Ispahani is the youngest son of Mirza A.H Ispahani. He is a former diplomat who served as the Pakistani ambassador to Switzerland and Italy in the 1990s. He also served as a special envoy for the Pakistani government during the presidency of Asif Ali Zardari, during which time he visited Bangladesh and spoke on bilateral relations.
      - Iran Ispahani Rahim: Iran Ispahani is a daughter of Mirza A.H Ispahani and Ameneh Sultan. She lives in Karachi.
    - Mirza Mahmood Ispahani (1904–1991): Mirza Mahmood Ispahani was the youngest son of Mirza Mohammad Ispahani. He was married to Bibi Kuchik Kazerooni (1910-2000). Mahmood shifted to West Pakistan after the Partition of India, while his sons Alijoon and Khaleel shifted to East Pakistan. He lived in Karachi until his demise in 1991.
      - Mirza Mohammad Ali Ispahani (1931–2019): Alijoon Ispahani was a son of Mirza Mahmood Ispahani and Bibi Kuchik Kazerooni. After the Partition of India he moved to East Pakistan, while most of his family moved to West Pakistan. He studied in England until 1952, after which he returned to East Pakistan and joined the Chittagong Jute Manufacturing Company, a subsidiary of M. M. Ispahani Limited. When Pakistan hosted the International Jute Conference in Dhaka in 1957, Alijoon attended it along with his cousin Sadri Ispahani as members of the Pakistan Jute Mills Association. He is regarded as the most low-profile member of the Ispahani family. Being a linguist, he spoke English, Bengali, Urdu, and Farsi. Alijoon Ispahani died in Dhaka in 2019 at the age of 88. He was married to Ameneh Ispahani, with whom he had 2 children. Ameneh Ispahani is a granddaughter of Mirza Ismail, who served as the Diwan of Hyderabad, Jaipur, and Mysore. Her mother, Shah Taj Begum, was the youngest daughter of Mirza Ismail.
        - Emaad Ispahani: Emaad Ispahani is the only son of Alijoon Ispahani and Ameneh Ispahani. He currently serves as a director of M.M. Ispahani. Emaad is married to Pooja Ispahani with whom he has two children.
        - Mariam Ispahani: Mariam Ispahani is a private pilot and entrepreneur based in the San Francisco Bay Area and serves as the CEO for the renewable energy company Saaze Corporation. She is also the head of a USA-Bangladesh bioplastics startup Sonali Bioplastics.
      - Mirza Mohammad Khaleel Ispahani (1933–2001): Khaleel Ispahani was a son of Mirza Mahmood Ispahani and Bibi Kuchik Kazerooni. He initially moved to East Pakistan after the Partition of India and lived in Dhanmondi, Dhaka along with his brother Alijoon. After the independence of Bangladesh, he moved to Karachi where he lived and eventually died in 2001.
  - Mirza Hashem Ispahani (1866-1943): Hashem Ispahani was a son of Mehdy Ispahani. He was born in Bombay in 1866 and died in 1943 in Tehran. He had four wives: Begum Soghra Ispahani, Bibi Fatimah Ispahani, Ismat Ispahani, and Maryam Khanum Ispahani. He had five children, the most notable being Justice M.A Ispahani.
    - Mirza Ali Ispahani (1900-1982): Ali Ispahani was born in 1900 in Calcutta to Hashem Ispahani and Fatimah Ispahani. In 1947, he moved to Dhaka, East Pakistan after the Partition of India along with his cousin Ahmad Ispahani. He served as a secretary in the Ministry of Law and later as the Chief Justice of East Pakistan from 1959 to 1962. M.A Ispahani used to live in Dhaka's Ispahani Colony, his family estate. He was married to Monirea Rashti Ispahani and had a son with her, Mirza Shahab Ispahani. He died in 1982 and was buried in Dhaka.
      - Mirza Shahab Ispahani: Shahab Ispahani was a son of Justice M.A Ispahani and Monirea Rashti Ispahani. He was born in Calcutta on 17 September 1941 but moved to Dhaka, East Pakistan after the Partition of India. He moved to England in 1952 for his studies and qualified as a chartered accountant there. In 1962, he was allotted a piece of land in Road 75, Gulshan, where he constructed a two-storey house and named it Lismore Court. The house was rented to the British Deputy High Commissioner to Bangladesh while Shahab continued to live in the Ispahani Colony. In 1972, the Government of Bangladesh seized Lismore Court under the controversial Enemy Property Act. The Ispahani family negotiated with the government to release the property and Monirea Rashti Ispahani even visited the president in 1984. However, the negotiations failed and Shahab filed a case against the government and won back the property in 1985. The Government of Bangladesh appealed the decision but the appeal was turned down. Shahab was represented by the prominent lawyer Barrister Rafique Ul Huq.
