= Shamsul Huq Zahid =

Bangladeshi journalist

- Occupation: Journalist
- Known for: Editor of The Financial Express

Shamsul Huq Zahid is a Bangladeshi journalist and editor of The Financial Express, a leading English-language financial daily in Bangladesh. He served as a member of the Media Reform Commission of the Interim government led by Muhammad Yunus.

== Career ==
Zahid began his journalism career in 1973 as a staff reporter at the now-defunct English-language daily The Morning News. He later joined The Bangladesh Times, where he worked from 1975 to 1997 in various roles, including chief reporter and city editor. He subsequently served as executive editor of the weekly Dhaka Courier for nearly three years.

In 2001, Zahid joined The Financial Express as a special correspondent. Over time, he held several senior editorial positions at the newspaper, including deputy editor, joint editor, and executive editor. In March 2022, he was appointed editor of the publication by the board of directors of International Publications Limited, the owning company of the newspaper. He is a former president of the Economic Reporters Forum, an organisation representing financial journalists in Bangladesh.

Zahid co-authored the book Rivers of Life, published by Panos London. After the fall of the Sheikh Hasina led Awami League government, he was appointment member of the Media Reform Commission of the Interim government led by Muhammad Yunus. He is a member of the Editors' Council. In November 2024, he was a made a member of the board of directors of the Press Institute of Bangladesh. In March 2025, the Media Reform Commission submitted its report to Muhammad Yunus. In December 2025, chief of the Media Reform Commission Kamal Ahmed stated that none of the commission’s recommendations had been implemented, citing bureaucratic resistance and a lack of political will.
