= Abul Hassan Ispahani =

Pakistani legislator and diplomat (1902–1981)

Member of the Bengal Legislative Assembly
- In office 1946–1947
- Preceded by: Abdur Rahman Siddiqui
- Constituency: Muslim Chamber of Commerce
- In office 1937–1945
- Succeeded by: Khwaja Nooruddin
- Constituency: South Calcutta

Personal details
- Born: 1902 Calcutta, Bengal Presidency
- Died: 1981 (aged 78–79) Karachi, Pakistan
- Party: All-India Muslim League
- Relatives: Mirza Ahmad Ispahani (brother); Farahnaz Ispahani (granddaughter)

Abul Hassan Ispahani
- Known for: Pakistan Movement activist in Bengal, British India

Mirza Abul Hassan Ispahani (Persian: میرزا ابو الحسن اصفهانی; 1902–1981) was a Pakistani politician and diplomat who served as an ambassador of Pakistan to the United States.

Before the independence of Pakistan in 1947, he was an active Pakistan Movement activist in Bengal, British India.

== Early life ==
Ispahani was born in 1902 to the Perso-Bengali Ispahani family of Kolkata. He was educated at St John's College, Cambridge. He completed his Bar-at-Law in 1924 from Inner Temple, London. In 1925, he joined the family business of M. M. Ispahani Limited and engaged in other business undertakings.

== Career ==
Abul Hassan Ispahani was elected a member of the Calcutta Corporation in 1933, but resigned in 1935 and worked for the introduction of separate electorates in the company. He was re-elected a member in 1940. He became joint secretary of the Bengal Provincial All India Muslim League in 1936-37 and remained its treasurer from 1936 to 1947. He was elected deputy mayor of Calcutta city from 1941 to 1942.

Ispahani was a member of the committee which was given the task of drawing up a Five-Year Plan for the educational economic, social and political advancement of Muslims which was constituted at the 28th session of the All India Muslim League held in Madras in April 1941. At the 29th session of Muslim League held in Allahabad in 1942, he moved the resolution which was passed giving full powers to Muhammad Ali Jinnah "to take every step or action as he may consider necessary in furtherance of relating to the objects of the Muslim League as he deems proper".

According to a major newspaper of Pakistan:

"Ispahani's most crucial contribution was the creation of a situation that brought the Muslim majority province of Bengal in the orbit of the League".

He became a member of the Indian Constituent Assembly in 1946 and represented the Muslim League at the New York Herald Tribune Forum the same year.

According to a major newspaper of Pakistan, "Without Bengal falling in behind the League, the demand for Pakistan would not have had the power behind it. For this, Pakistan owes a great deal to Ispahani".

After Independence of Pakistan, he became a Member of the Pakistan Constituent Assembly in 1947. Ispahani toured the United States as a personal representative of Muhammad Ali Jinnah and was the ambassador to the United States from October 1948 to February 1952. He was Deputy Leader of Pakistan Delegation to the United Nations Organization on Trade and Development in 1947. He was Vice Chairman of the Pakistan Delegation to the U.N. Security Council on the Kashmir issue and was the High Commissioner to the United Kingdom from 1952 to 1954. Ispahani was Pakistan's Federal Minister for Industries and Commerce from 1954 to 1955. He also was an Ambassador of Pakistan to Afghanistan in 1973–74.

Ispahani family founded Orient Airways in 1946 which would later become Pakistan International Airlines in 1955.

== Death and legacy ==
Abul Hassan Ispahani died in Karachi, Pakistan in 1981.

=== Abul Hassan Ispahani Road in Karachi, Pakistan ===
Karachi city mayor Syed Mustafa Kamal inaugurated Abul Hassan Ispahani Road in July 2006 to pay tribute to him.

=== Commemorative postage stamp ===
Pakistan Post issued a commemorative postage stamp to honor his services to Pakistan in its 'Pioneers of Freedom' series in 1990.

== Family ==
During the 1990s, Mirza Zia Ispahani, the youngest son of Mirza Abul Hassan Ispahani, served as Pakistan Ambassador in Switzerland and Italy and is currently Ambassador-at-large with Minister of State status and visited Bangladesh on the instructions of Pakistan Peoples Party co-chairman Asif Ali Zardari. His granddaughter, Farahnaz Ispahani, served as a member of Pakistan's parliament and is the wife of Pakistan's former ambassador to United States, Hussain Haqqani and lived for some time in the same house in Washington as did her grandfather.

== Books ==
He authored a number of books which include:

- The Case of Muslim India (1946)
- 27 Days in China (1960)
- Leningrad to Samarkand (1962)
- Quaid-e-Azam Jinnah, as I Knew Him (1967)

Diplomatic posts
Preceded by Office created	Pakistan Ambassador to the United States; 1948–1952	Succeeded by Muhammad Ali Bogra
