= Mirza Ali Behrouze Ispahani =

Bangladeshi businessperson

- Born: October 30, 1950; Dhaka, East Pakistan
- Died: January 23, 2017 (aged 66)
- Resting place: Hossaini Dalan Graveyard, Dhaka
- Organization: M. M. Ispahani Limited
- Spouse: Zahida Ispahani
- Parent: Mirza Mehdy Ispahani
- Relatives: Ispahani family

Mirza Ali Behrouze Ispahani was a Bangladeshi businessman from the Ispahani family and the chairman of M. M. Ispahani Limited.

== Early life ==
Behrouze was born on 30 October 1950, into the Ispahani family, which was founded in 1820, Haji Mohammed Hashem (1789–1850), the founder of Ispahani Group, who moved from Ispahan (Isfahan) in Persia to Bombay, and established the business. After the death of his father, Mirza Mehdy Ispahani, he was elected chairman of the M.M. Ispahani.

== Career ==
Behrouze was chairman of MM Ispahani Ltd from 2004 until his demise in January 2017. He was a member of the Board of Trustees of the Independent University, Bangladesh (IUB). He was also a sponsor director and managing director of the International Publications Limited (IPL), the owning company of The Financial Express (FE). The government of Bangladesh gave him the title of Commercially Important Person.

== Social activities ==
Behrouze was chairman of the Ispahani Islamia Eye Institute and Hospital and Ispahani Public School and College.

== Awards and achievements ==
M.M. Ispahani was awarded 'Enterprise of the Year 2003' by the Bangladesh Business Award. He played a role in the country's economic growth by reinvesting more.

== Death ==
Behrouze died on 23 January 2017 at the age of 67 in Bangladesh. He was buried in Hoseni Dalan Mosque, Dhaka. In a condolence message, Prime Minister Sheikh Hasina recalled with gratitude his contributions towards flourishing trade, commerce, and industry in Bangladesh through his reputed industrial group.

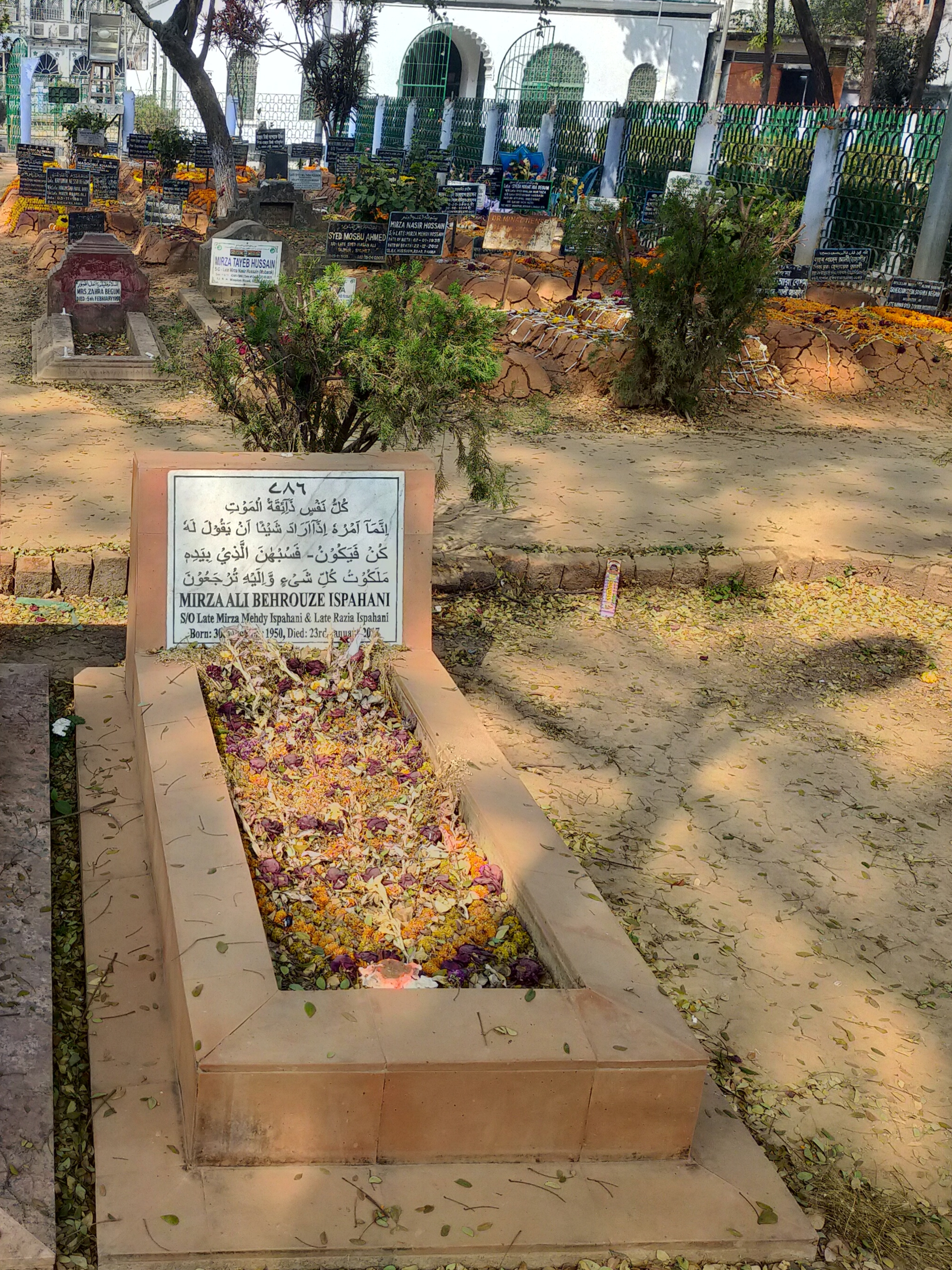
Grave of Mirza Ali Behrouze Ispahani (1950 - 2017) at Hussaini Dalan, Dhaka

== See also ==
- Mirza Ahmad Ispahani, Chairman (1934–1949)
- Mirza Mehdy Ispahani (Sadri Ispahani), Chairman (1949–2004)
