= Mohammad Badrul Ahsan =

Bangladeshi journalist, columnist, and economist (1959 - 2020)

- Born: August 30, 1959; Narsingdi, East Pakistan
- Died: February 6, 2020 (aged 60); Dhaka, Bangladesh
- Occupations: Journalist, Columnist, Economist
- Years active: 2000–2017

Mohammad Badrul Ahsan (30 August 1959 – 6 February 2020) was a Bangladeshi journalist, columnist, economist, and founder-editor of the English weekly magazine First News. He earned national acclaim through his column Crosstalk in The Daily Star, which ran weekly for 17 years.

== Early life and education ==
Ahsan was born on 30 August 1959 in Narsingdi and completed his early education at Narinda School and Notre Dame College, Dhaka. He studied economics at the University of Dhaka and later pursued higher education at George Washington University and Kansas State University.

== Career ==
Ahsan worked in leading multinational corporations and held a senior position at Standard Chartered Bank in Dhaka and Dubai. He was the head of corporate affairs at the bank. He voluntarily retired in 2000 to pursue a career in writing. His popular column Crosstalk, published every Friday in *The Daily Star*, became one of the most-read English opinion columns in Bangladesh, known for its critical insight, and lyrical style.

Ahsan also co-authored an academic paper titled "A Strategic Model for Multinational Corporate Social Responsibility in the Third World" with Professor Jay Laughlin of Kansas State University.

Ahsan wrote The night of the lost nose-pins about the 2001 Bangladesh post-election violence, he stated that 200 Hindu women, youngest was 8, and the oldest was 70, were gang raped by members of the Bangladesh Nationalist Party in Char Fasson Upazila, Bhola District.

Ahsan founded First News, a quality English weekly magazine. He edited all 355 published issues and was credited with conceptualizing major cover stories, editing content, and writing editorials. The magazine had to close following ownership disputes. He was close with Syed Fahim Munaim, Mirza Ali Behrouze Ispahani, A. H. M. Moazzem Hossain, and Syed Badrul Ahsan.

== Publications ==
- In Search of a Nation (1992), Mowla Brothers
- A Good Man in the Woods and Other Essays (2004)
- The Parallax View: A Collection of Critical Essays (2016)
- Grameen Bank and Muhammad Yunus
- Crosstalk Essays

== Death ==
Ahsan died on 6 February 2020 in Uttara, Dhaka.
