= Girls Squad (TV series) =

2021 Bengali language web series

- Poster of Girls Squad
- Written by: Maidul Rakib & Shefat Hossain
- Story by: Maidul Rakib
- Directed by: Maidul Rakib
- Starring: Samira Khan Mahi, Rukaiya Jahan Chamak, Samonty Shoumi, Sharna Lata, Nabila Binta Islam, Jarin Tasnim Antara, Chashi Alam, Marzuk Russell, Tania Brishty, Anindita Mimi, Rusho Sheikh, Shahriar Nazim Joy, Zaher Alvi, Shehzad Omar, Kochi Khondokar, and Anwar Hossain
- Country of origin: Bangladesh
- Original language: Bengali
- No. of seasons: 2
- No. of episodes: 20

Production
- Producer: Mushfiqur Rahman Manzu
- Cinematography: HM Zaman and Momin Hossain
- Production company: Bongo BD

Original release
- Release: 20 July 2021

Girls Squad (Bengali: গার্লস স্কোয়াড); is a 2021 Bangladeshi romantic-comedy drama series. The series was directed by Maidul Rakib and produced by Mushfiqur Rahman Manzu. It is a Bongo Original series of Bongo BD. The story was written by Maidul Rakib and the dialogues were written by Shefat Hossain (HD). It features Samira Khan Mahi, Rukaiya Jahan Chamak, Samonty Shoumi, Sharna Lata, Nabila Binta Islam, Jarin Tasnim Antara, Chashi Alam and Marzuk Russell in the lead roles. Many others including Kochi Khondokar, and Anwar Hossain have performed important roles.

== Cast ==
Season 1

- Samira Khan Mahi as Faria
- Rukaiya Jahan Chamak as Riya
- Samonty Shoumi as Tonni
- Sharna Lata as Mim
- Nabila Binta Islam as Zara
- Jarin Tasnim Antara as Sabrina
- Chashi Alam as Cobra
- Marzuk Russell as Gangua Bhai
- Kochi Khondokar
- Anwar Hossain

Season 2

- Samira Khan Mahi as Faria
- Rukaiya Jahan Chamak as Riya
- Samonty Shoumi as Tonni
- Sharna Lata as Mim
- Tania Brishty
- Anindita Mimi
- Rusho Sheikh
- Shahriar Nazim Joy
- Zaher Alvi
- Shehzad Omar
- Anwar Hossain

== Synopsis ==
The first season of Girls Squad premiered on Bongo BD in July 2021 and follows the lives of six young women as they navigate the complexities of love, life, inspiration, friendship, and understanding. Set in a contemporary urban landscape, this emotional rollercoaster takes the audience on a journey of self-discovery and growth, exploring the highs and lows of young adulthood.

== Reception ==
Following its initial success, the series was granted a renewal for a second season, which premiered in June 2022 on the Bongo BD platform. This continuation allows fans to further engage with the evolving tales of these vibrant characters, continuing to explore their experiences and evolution in the dynamic context of contemporary urban life.

== Episodes ==
The inaugural season of the series was allocated a production budget of 15 lacs for the creation of 20 episodes. Subsequently, for its second season, the budget was increased to 18 lacs to facilitate the production of an additional 20 episodes. The budgetary enhancements were aimed at maintaining and enhancing the quality of the show's production values and overall viewer experience.
