= Floor Number 7 =

- Official Poster
- Directed by: Raihan Rafi
- Written by: Raihan Rafi
- Screenplay by: Raihan Rafi
- Produced by: Redoan Rony
- Starring: Shabnam Bubly; Raaz Mania; Shahriar Nazim Joy
- Cinematography: Sumon Sarkar
- Edited by: Simit Ray Antor
- Music by: Jahid Nirob
- Production companies: PAPER Production and Kanon films
- Distributed by: Chorki
- Release date: 2 May 2022
- Country: Bangladesh
- Language: Bengali

Floor Number 7 (Bengali: ৭ নম্বর ফ্লোর) is a 2022 Bangladeshi crime thriller film directed and written by Raihan Rafi. It stars Shabnam Bubly, Shahriar Nazim Joy, Raaz Mania, and Sumon Anowar. It was released at Chorki on 2 May 2022. It was a record breaking original film by Chorki.

== Cast ==
- Shabnam Bubly as Aboni
- Shahriar Nazim Joy as Nayeem Rahman
- Toma Mirza as Pakhi
- Raaz Mania as Sadman Chowdhury
- Sumon Anowar as Ramiz Uddin
- Sayem Rahman as Shibu
- Jahangir Alam
- Jainal Jack
- Saiful Jarnal
- Farhad Limon
- Kamruzzaman Tapu

== Release ==
The film premiered at Chorki on 2 May 2022.

== Reception ==
=== Critical response ===
The Financial Express called the film a perfectly balanced and blended thrill.
