= Samira Khan Mahi =

Bangladeshi model and actress

- Born: Farzana Yasmin Koli; February 7, 1997 (age 29); Sylhet, Bangladesh
- Spouse: S.H.Shahansha

| occupation =

- Actress
- model

| years_active = 2014–present

| module = Beauty pageant titleholderTitle

- Miss Universe Bangladesh 2026
Major competitions
- Miss Universe 2026
- (TBD)

}} Samira Khan Mahi (née Farzana Yasmin Koli; born 7 February 1997) is a Bangladeshi model and actress who won Miss Universe Bangladesh 2026. She is representing Bangladesh at Miss Universe 2026.

== Life and career ==
Mahi was born Farzana Yasmin Koli on 7 February 1997 in Sylhet, where she also spent her childhood and completed her education. She entered show business in 2014, when she entered the Rang RTV 20 20 Colors Model Search competition, where she placed as the first runner-up. That same year, she changed her name to Samira Khan Mahi.

In 2021, she starred in the romantic-comedy drama series Girls Squad. Following Girls Squad, she appeared in more than 120 dramas and web content until 2025.

=== Miss Universe 2026 ===
On 7 November 2026, Mahi was appointed Miss Universe Bangladesh 2026, just days before activities for Miss Universe 2026 began. She succeeded her friend Tangia Zaman Methila in representing the country in the international competition. Her appointment to the role was met with concern over her limited preparation for the contest and the unexpectedness of her appointment owing to her reputation as an actress.

== Filmography ==
=== Television ===
Year	Title	Role	Notes	Ref(s).
2021	Girls Squad	Faria	Season 1	

Awards and achievements
Preceded by Tangia Zaman Methila (Dhaka)	Miss Universe Bangladesh; 2026 (Appointed)	Incumbent
