= IPSC =

IPSC may refer to:

- International Practical Shooting Confederation, a shooting sport association based on the concept of practical shooting
- Ispahani Public School & College, a school in Chittagong, Bangladesh
- Institute for the Protection and Security of the Citizen, located in Ispra, Italy, is one of the seven institutes of the Joint Research Centre, a Directorate-General of the European Commission
- Internet Problem Solving Contest, an online programming competition
- Ireland Palestine Solidarity Campaign, a volunteer organisation
- IP Site Connect, a feature of digital mobile radio (DMR)
- Independent Parliamentary Standards Commission (Australian Parliament, 47th Parliament of Australia)

iPSC may refer to:

- Induced pluripotent stem cell, a type of pluripotent induced stem cell
- Intel iPSC, any of several high-performance computers manufactured by Intel

== See also ==
- Iota Piscium (ι Psc) a star
- Pisces I (Psc I) a galaxy
