= Financial Express =

Financial Express may refer to:

- The Financial Express (Bangladesh), an English daily newspaper in Bangladesh
- The Financial Express (India), an English daily business newspaper in India
