= Mirza Ahmad Ispahani =

Bangladeshi businessman and founder of Orient Airways (1898-1986)

- Born: 1898; Rangoon, Burma
- Died: 1986 (aged 87–88)
- Known for: Owner of M.M. Ispahani
- Spouse: Patience Cooper (m. 1926; div. 1928)
- Children: Mirza Mehdy Ispahani
- Relatives: See Ispahani family

Mirza Ahmad Ispahani (1898–1986) was a Perso-Bengali businessman based in Chittagong and the patriarch of the Ispahani family. He was the founder of Orient Airways and the first chairman of Pakistan International Airlines (PIA). He was the chairman of Ispahani Group.

== Early life ==
Mirza Ahmad Ispahani, eldest son of Mirza Mohammed Ispahani, was born in Rangoon, Burma in 1898. He went for schooling in Madras, India. After his matriculation at the age of 20, he joined his father's business in Calcutta.

== Business ==
A short time after joining the business, Ispahani was made a junior partner. When his father died in May 1925, he became the senior partner of the firm along with two other partners, his brothers, Mirza Abol Hassan Ispahani and Mirza Mahmood Ispahani. In 1934, M. M. Ispahani and partnership was converted to a limited liability company in Kolkata. Orient Airways was founded by Mirza Ahmad Ispahani and Adamjee Haji Dawood on 23 October 1946. In 1948 the company was moved to Chittagong, East Pakistan. In 1965 he founded the Ispahani Islamia Eye Institute and Hospital in Dhaka. On 11 March 1955 Orient Airways was merged with a proposed airline of the Pakistan Government and turned into Pakistan International Airlines Corporation, the national airline of Pakistan. The company expanded into multi-dimensional business activities including jute, tea, textiles, engineering, shipping, matches and plywood. He was the first exporter of tea from Bangladesh. After the Bangladesh Liberation War, his properties were nationalized under the Enemy Property Act. Ahmad Ispahani personally went to meet Sheikh Mujibur Rahman and requested that his properties be denationalized. Mujib had the law specially changed for Ahmad Ispahani and handed all his properties back to him. When Ziaur Rahman became the president, he requested that Ahmad Ispahani become the chairman of Biman, because of his expertise in the aviation industry. However, he politely turned down the offer.

== Legacy ==
In 1960, Mirza Ahmad established the Ispahani Islamia Eye Institute and Hospital, which is still the largest multispecialty eye hospital in Bangladesh. He also established the Ispahani Public School & College, Cumilla in 1962 and Ispahani Public School & College in 1979. His only son Sadri Ispahani established the Mirza Ahmed Ispahani High School in 1987.

== See also ==
- Yar Mohammad Khan
- M.M. Ispahani
- Islamia Eye Hospital
- Ispahani Public School & College
