= Shirin Akter Shila =

Bangladeshi model and beauty queen

Shirin Akter Shela
- Born: Thakurgaon, Bangladesh
- Education: Independent University Bangladesh, University of Dhaka
- Beauty pageant titleholder
- Title: Miss Universe Bangladesh 2019
- Hair color: Black
- Eye color: Brown
- Major competitions: Miss World Bangladesh 2018 (Top 10); Miss Universe Bangladesh 2019 (Winner); Miss Universe 2019 (Unplaced)

Shirin Akter Shela (Bengali: শিরিন আক্তার শিলা) is a Bangladeshi model and beauty pageant titleholder who was crowned Miss Universe Bangladesh 2019. She was a third year graduate student of the Physics Department of University of Dhaka. She is now pursuing a degree in Environmental Science and Management at Independent University Bangladesh.

== Pageantry ==
=== Miss World Bangladesh 2018 ===
Shela participated in Miss World Bangladesh 2018. She was among the top ten contestants in this competition.

=== Face of Bangladesh 2019 ===
Shela was declared the best female model of Face of Bangladesh 2019.

=== Face of Asia 2019 ===
Shela was a contestant of Face of Asia 2019 in South Korea's capital Seoul where she represented Bangladesh.

=== Miss Universe Bangladesh 2019 ===
Shela was crowned as Miss Universe Bangladesh 2019 on 23 October 2019. She was crowned by the winner of Miss Universe 1994 by Sushmita Sen.

=== Miss Universe 2019 ===
Shela represented Bangladesh during the Miss Universe 2019 competition that took place in Atlanta but she failed to place.

Awards and achievements
| Preceded by First winner | Miss Universe Bangladesh; 2019 | Succeeded by Tangia Zaman Methila |
