= Farahnaz Ispahani =

Pakistani politician

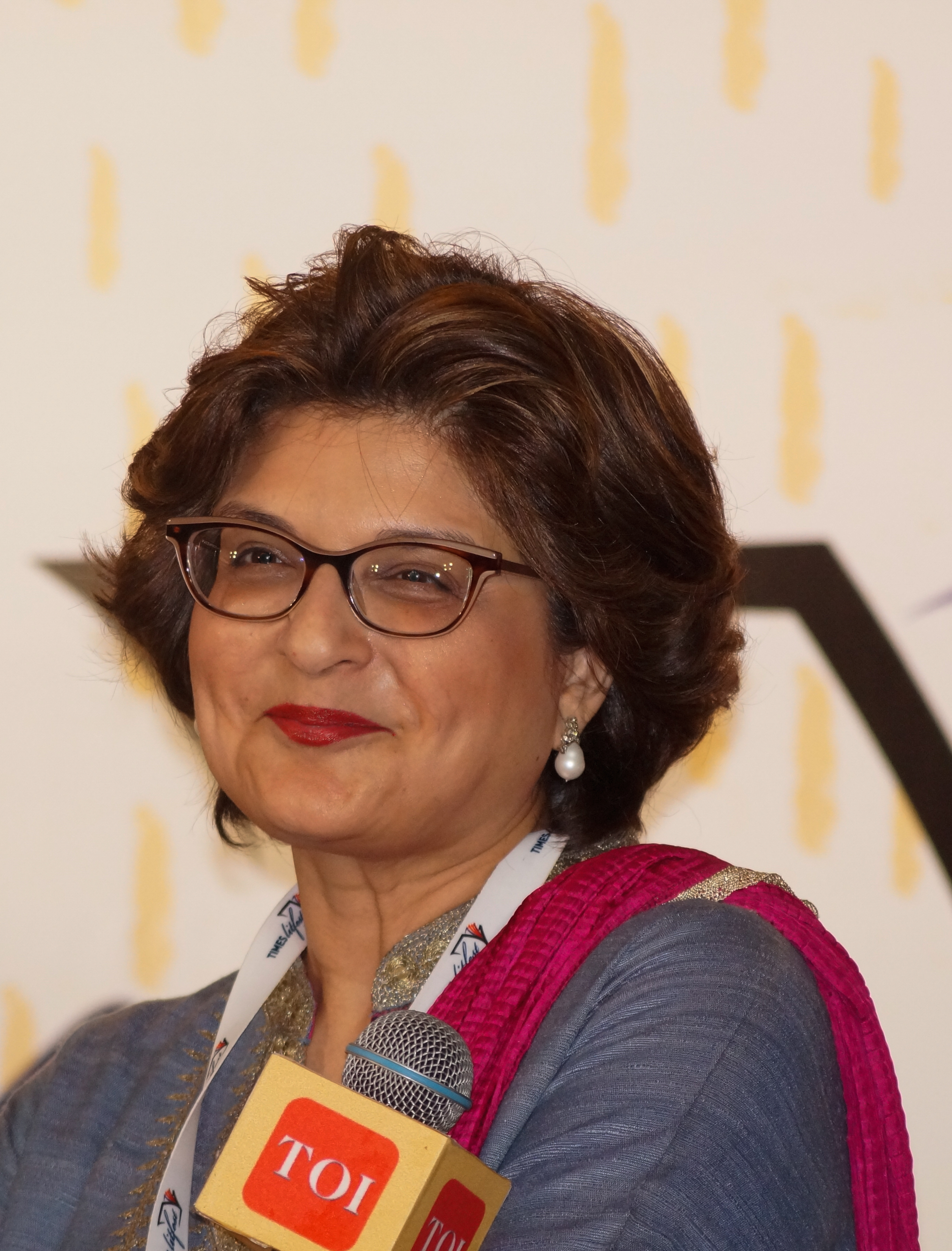
- Farahnaz Ispahani in 2016

Member of the National Assembly of Pakistan
- In office 2008–2012
- Constituency: Reserved seat for women

Personal details
- Born: Karachi, Pakistan
- Spouse: Husain Haqqani
- Parent(s): Mirza Mohamed Ispahani (father); Akhtar Ispahani (mother)
- Relatives: Ispahani family

Farahnaz Ispahani (Urdu: فرح ناز اصفہانی) is a Pakistani-American writer and former politician who served as member of the National Assembly of Pakistan between 2008 and 2012. She is a senior fellow at the Religious Freedom Institute and a member of the Anti-Defamation League Task Force on Middle East Minorities in Washington, D.C.

== Personal life ==
She is married to Husain Haqqani and is the granddaughter of Abul Hassan Isphani. She attended Wellesley College.

== Professional career ==
She is a writer and authored Purifying the Land of the Pure: Pakistan's Religious Minorities. As a journalist, she has worked with ABC News, CNN and MSNBC.

In 2012, Ispahani was named one of the Top 100 Global Thinkers by Foreign Policy. She was also named as Top 100 Women Who Matter the same year by Newsweek Pakistan. From 2013 to 2014, she served as a Public Policy Scholar at the Woodrow Wilson International Center for Scholars.

== Political career ==
She was elected to the National Assembly of Pakistan as a candidate of Pakistan Peoples Party on a seat reserved for women from Sindh in the 2008 Pakistani general election. During her tenure as Member of the National Assembly, she served as media advisor to President of Pakistan Asif Ali Zardari from 2008 until 2012 when her National Assembly membership was terminated on the basis of holding dual nationality.

== Bibliography ==
- Ispahani, Farahnaz (2015). Purifying the Land of the Pure: A History of Pakistan's Religious Minorities. HarperCollins. ISBN 9789351775539.
- Ispahani, Farahnaz (2023). Politics Of Hate:Religious Majoritarianism in South Asia. HarperCollins. ISBN 9789356293557.
