= Miss Universe Bangladesh =

National Beauty pageant in Bangladesh

- Formation: 2019; 7 years ago
- Type: Beauty pageant
- Headquarters: Dhaka
- Location: Bangladesh
- Members: Miss Universe
- Official language: Bangla; English
- National Director: Mustafa Islam Duke
- Parent organisation: Flora Bank Limited
- Website: www.missuniverse.com.bd

Miss Universe Bangladesh is a national beauty pageant that selects Bangladesh's representative in the Miss Universe pageant, one of the Big Four international beauty pageants.

Reigning Miss Universe Bangladesh is Samira Khan Mahi who was crowned by outgoing titleholder Tangia Zaman Methila.

== History ==
Miss Universe Bangladesh was officially launched on September 7, 2019. The competition's crown was unveiled on October 15, 2019. Shirin Akter Shila became the first winner of Miss Universe Bangladesh in 2019.

The second edition saw Tangia Zaman Methila crowned as the winner. However, due to travel restrictions, Methila was unable to represent Bangladesh at Miss Universe 2020, forcing her to withdraw from the competition.

== Titleholders ==
- : Declared as Winner
- : Ended as runner-up or top 5/6 qualification
- : Ended as one of the finalists or semifinalists
- : Ended as special awards winner

On occasion, when the winner does not qualify (due to age) for either contest, a runner-up is sent.

Year	District	Miss Universe Bangladesh	Placement at Miss Universe	Special Award(s)	Notes
2026	Sylhet	Samira Khan Mahi	TBA		Mahi was appointed as Miss Universe Bangladesh 2026
2025	Dhaka	Tangia Zaman Methila	Top 30		Tangia was recrowned as Miss Universe Bangladesh 2025
2024	Dhaka	Aniqa Alam	Unplaced		Aniqa was appointed as Miss Universe Bangladesh 2024
Did not compete between 2021—2023
2020	Dhaka	Tangia Zaman Methila	Did not compete		Due to travel restrictions she failed to compete
2019	Thakurgaon	Shirin Akter Shila	Unplaced		Previously, Shila became the best female model of Face of Bangladesh 2019

=== Wins by district ===
District	Titles	Years
Dhaka	1	2020
Thakurgaon	1	2019

== See also ==
- Miss Bangladesh
- Miss World Bangladesh
- Miss Earth Bangladesh
- Miss Grand Bangladesh
