= Hotel Relax =

2023 Bengali language web series

- Poster of Hotel Relax
- Genre: Comedy, Thriller
- Written by: Kajal Arefin Ome
- Story by: Kajal Arefin Ome
- Directed by: Kajal Arefin Ome
- Starring: Ziaul Hoque Polash, Saidur Rahman Pavel, Marzuk Russell, Parsa Evana, Mishu Sabbir, Shimul Sharma, Musafire Syed Bacchu, Chasi Alam, Lamima Lam, Saraf Ahmed Zibon and Purnima
- Music by: Adit Rahman
- Country of origin: Bangladesh
- Original language: Bengali
- No. of seasons: 1
- No. of episodes: 6

Production
- Producer: Mushfiqur Rahman Manzu
- Production company: Bongo BD

Original release
- Release: 24 April 2023

Hotel Relax (Bengali: হোটেল রিল্যাক্স) is a 2023 Bangladeshi comedy-thriller web series. The series was directed by Kajal Arefin Ome and produced by Mushfiqur Rahman Manzu. It is a Bongo Original series of Bongo BD. The story was written by Kajal Arefin Ome. The series features Ziaul Hoque Polash, Saidur Rahman Pavel, Marzuk Russell, Parsa Evana, Mishu Sabbir, Shimul Sharma, Musafire Syed Bacchu, Chasi Alam, Lamima Lam, Saraf Ahmed Zibon and Purnima. The web series follows the story of a businessman, a fraud, a kidnapper and a gangster check-in in the same hotel. Their plan to relax at the hotel puts them in more trouble than they had anticipated.

== Cast ==
- Mishu Sabbir as Salam
- Ziaul Hoque Polash As Rabbi
- Marzuk Russell as Ashik
- Chashi Alam As Kalu
- Sharaf Ahmed Jibon
- Schuumonn Patwary As Monir Hossain
- Musafire Syed Bacchu As Bacchu
- Tamim Mridha As Shakil
- Md Saidur Rahman Pavel As Juwel
- Parsa Evana As Tamanna
- Lamima Lam as Model Girl
- Purnima as Chief Police Officer
- Ishrat Zaheen as Girlfriend of Rabbi

== Synopsis ==
The narrative unfolds with the introduction of Bacchu, a renowned pickpocket known for his cunning skills and unethical ways. His story begins as he embarks on a bus journey, targeting unsuspecting passengers' wallets. However, his criminal activities take a dramatic turn when a group of menacing gangsters unexpectedly board the same bus, revealing Bacchu's secret thievery. The furious passengers turn on Bacchu, subjecting him to a brutal beating and ultimately reporting him to the authorities. Haunted by this humiliating experience, Bacchu becomes consumed by a thirst for revenge and desperation. His sole mission now is to locate Kalu Dakat, a notorious criminal, and ensure his arrest by law enforcement.

In a different part of the country, businessman Alamgir from Mymensingh frequently travels to Dhaka for business purposes. However, his insatiable desires lead him to seek the company of women wherever he goes. During one of his trips, he checks into Hotel Relax and requests an unusual service that perplexes the hotel staff.

Rabbi, an unemployed dropout, is a regular guest at Hotel Relax. He has a sinister agenda—enticing new girlfriends to his hotel room, executing meticulously planned robberies, and repeating the process with other unsuspecting victims. Meanwhile, Salam, a loyal waiter at Hotel Relax, grapples with an uncontrollable temper, especially when faced with mistreatment. His life takes a dark turn when he impulsively pushes a rude customer off the hotel's rooftop. To his horror, a witness observes him committing this heinous act.

As Alamgir seeks companionship in his hotel room with the assistance of a pimp, an unexpected twist occurs. A fake policeman named Shakil apprehends them in the act, confiscating their cash. Unbeknownst to Shakil, his pursuit leads him to the room of the infamous Kalu Dakat, resulting in his own capture. Simultaneously, Bacchu, driven by his relentless mission to find Kalu Dakat, assembles a team of police officers to raid Hotel Relax. The hotel plunges into chaos as the police force arrives, engaging in a fierce shootout with Kalu Dakat's gang. The hotel manager awakens to the carnage, discovering the shattered state of Hotel Relax.

== Soundtrack ==
The soundtrack of "Hotel Relax" was created by the music producer and composer Adit Rahman, featuring the voices of Parvez Sazzad, Aditi Rahman Dola, and VXL. The lyrics were written by Rakib Hasan Rahul.
