= Shahriar Nazim Joy =

Bangladeshi actor, writer, and director

- Born: 8 January
- Occupations: Actor, director, writer, TV host
- Years active: 1997–present
- Spouse: Nusrat Ananya
- Children: 1 son

Shahriar Nazim Joy is a Bangladeshi actor, writer, and director. He mainly appears in Bangladeshi television serials and films. He debuted in television in Godhuli Logne and debuted in films in Jiboner Golpo.

== Career ==
=== Film ===
Shahriar Nazim Joy made his film debut in 2006 with Jiboner Golpo, directed by Gazi Mazharul Anwar. He subsequently appeared in films such as Ei Je Duniya (2007) and Pashaner Prem (2011).

== Hosting and TV presenting ==
Shahriar Nazim Joy became a popular television presenter with his talk show Sense of Humor, where he interviewed celebrities in a candid and engaging format.

== Works ==
=== Films ===
Year	Title	Role	Notes	Ref.
2006	Jiboner Golpo		Debut film	
2007	Ei Je Duniya!			
2007	Gram Gonjer Piriti			
2011	Pashaner Prem			
2014	Most Welcome 2			
2015	Prarthona		Directorial debut	
2018	Orpita	—	Director	
2020	Amar Ma	—	Director	
2020	Priyo Komola		Director	
2022	Floor Number 7	Nayeem Rahman		
2025	840			
2021†	Paap Kahini		Director	
2021†	Dui Jubotir Jatra		Director	

=== Web series ===
Year	Title	Role	Notes	Ref.
2024	Tribhuj			
2023	Friday			
2023	Guti	Selim		
2021	Girls Squad	Rizvi Amin		
2025	Paap Kahini			
2025	Jimmi			

Key
†	Denotes films that have not yet been released

=== Hosted programs ===
Here is the list of programs hosted by Shahriar Nazim Joy:

Program	Episodes	Channel	Notes
300 Seconds	900 Episodes	Channel i	
Sense of Humor	35 Episodes	ATN Bangla	
Shahriar Nazim Joy Show	500 Episodes	YouTube	
With Nazim Joy	45 Episodes	ETV	
Common Sense	12 Episodes	Asian TV	
Love & Sorrow	45 Episodes	Bongo TV	
Nazim Joy Show	33 Episodes	YouTube	
Tarar Mela	7 Episodes	YouTube	
Taroka Kothon	10 Episodes	Channel i	
Jiboner Golpo	150 Episodes	Channel i	
13 Question	300 Episodes	Channel i	
