= M. M. Ispahani Limited =

Bangladeshi conglomerate headquartered in Chittagong

M.M. Ispahani Limited
- Type: Private
- Industry: Conglomerate
- Predecessor: M.M. Ispahani & Sons
- Founded: 1820; 206 years ago
- Founder: Mirza Mohammed Ispahani
- Headquarters: Chittagong, Bangladesh
- Key people: Mirza Salman Ispahani (Chairman)
- Products: Tea, consumer goods, seeds, textiles, yarn, jute, real estate, ISP
- Services: Shipping, healthcare
- Owner: Ispahani family
- Subsidiaries: Ispahani Foods Limited; Ispahani Agro Limited; Pahartali Textile and Hosiery Mills; Broad Band Telecom Services Limited; South East Trading Limited; Islamia Eye Hospital; Orient Airways
- Website: www.ispahanibd.com; Ispahani Tea website

M.M. Ispahani Limited (Bengali: এম এম ইস্পাহানি লিমিটেড), also known as The Ispahani Group, is a Bangladeshi conglomerate headquartered in Chittagong. It is the oldest company in Bangladesh, founded in 1820, and owned by the Ispahani family. The group owns Bangladesh's leading tea company, as well as other food brands in the country. It also has interests in real estate, textiles, agriculture, shipping, jute, packaging and hospitality.

== See also ==
- Mirza Ahmad Ispahani, Chairman (1934–1949)
- Mirza Mehdy Ispahani (Sadri Ispahani), Chairman (1949–2004)
- Yar Mohammad Khan, Director (1958)
- Mirza Ali Behrouze Ispahani, Chairman (2004–2017)
