= A. H. M. Moazzem Hossain =

- Born: 1 January 1948
- Died: 2 August 2018 (aged 70)
- Education: University of Dhaka (BA, MA)
- Occupations: Journalist, editor
- Known for: Editor of The Financial Express

A. H. M. Moazzem Hossain (1 January 1948 – 2 August 2018) was a Bangladeshi journalist and editor. He was best known as the founding editor of The Financial Express, a leading English-language daily focused on business and finance.

== Early life and education ==
Hossain was born on 1 January 1948. His father was Ayub Ali and his mother was Rezia Khatun. He completed his undergrad and master's in economics at the University of Dhaka in 1967 and 1968, respectively.

== Career ==
Hossain worked in Karachi as an officer in the training and research department of Habib Bank Limited, and later in Islamabad as a research official at the Ministry of Finance.

Hossain began his journalism career in 1971 as a reporter at The Pakistan Observer (which became The Bangladesh Observer). He later worked at various news outlets, including The New Nation, United News of Bangladesh, Dhaka Courier, and The Daily Star, where he was the economics editor. He was the founding president of the Economic Reporters Forum in 1992. He became the founding editor and publisher of The Financial Express in 1993 under International Publications Limited, where he was also the managing director. The newspaper was supported by Mahaburur Rahman, Mirza Ali Behrouze Ispahani, Syed Manzur Elahi, Zakiudin Ahmed, and Mossaraf Hossain.

Hossain was a member of the management board of the Press Institute of Bangladesh from 1995 to 2001 and was also a board member of the Bangladesh Sangbad Sangstha between 1997 and 2000. Hossain held two consecutive terms as a member of the board of directors of Janata Bank. In addition, he was a director of Securities Trading Company Limited, a subsidiary of the Investment Corporation of Bangladesh.

Hossain was an independent director of Bay Leasing and Investment Limited and Southeast Bank Limited. He was a senior fellow of the Bangladesh Institute of Development Studies. Hossain received the Life Term Achievement Award from the Economic Reporters Forum and the Nawab Bahadur Syed Nawab Ali Chowdhury National Award in Journalism. He received the Distinguished Professional Award for Journalism from Mercantile Bank Limited.

== Death ==
Hossain died on 2 August 2018 after being hospitalized for various health complications at Square Hospital, Dhaka. His funeral included three namaz-e-janaza services: at his residence in Boro Moghbazar, at The Financial Express office, and at the Jatiya Press Club. He was buried in Azimpur Graveyard. Prime Minister Sheikh Hasina and Finance Minister AMA Muhith sent their condolences.
