= Mirza Mehdy Ispahani =

Bangladeshi businesspeople

- Born: Mirza Mehdy Ispahani; 1923; Calcutta, Bengal Presidency, British Raj
- Died: 20 January 2004 (aged 80–81); Bangkok, Thailand
- Other names: Sadri Ispahani
- Occupation: Chairman of M. M Ispahani Limited
- Spouse: Razia Ispahani (1924–2017)
- Children: 1 daughter and 5 sons, including Mirza Ali Behrouze Ispahani
- Father: Mirza Ahmad Ispahani
- Relatives: Ispahani family

Mirza Mehdy Ispahani (also known as Sadri Ispahani; 1923–2004), son of Mirza Ahmad Ispahani, was Chairman of M.M. Ispahani from 1949 until 2004. Mirza Ali Behrouze Ispahani, son of Mirza Mehdy Ispahani was elected as the Chairman of M.M. Ispahani in 2004.

== Business policy ==
In 1947, M.M. Ispahani moved its corporate headquarters in Chittagong with Mirza Ahmed's son Mirza Mehdy Ispahani at the helm of the businesses. After partition, the group made significant investments into tea-plantations in Sylhet. During this period the group was also the largest jute exporter in the Indian Sub-continent.

== Career ==
Sadri was made chairman of the Ispahani Group at the age of 26. He continued to support different charitable institutions and organizations engaged in social welfare activities. In 1987, after the death of his father, Sadri founded a school in Pahartali, Chittagong named Mirza Ahmed Ispahani High School. Mirza Mehdy Ispahani also played a political role in Bangladesh. He was the founder treasure of National Awami Party in 1957.

== Death ==
He died on 20 January 2004 in Bumrungrad Hospital, Bangkok from cardiac arrest, leaving behind his wife, five sons, three daughters.

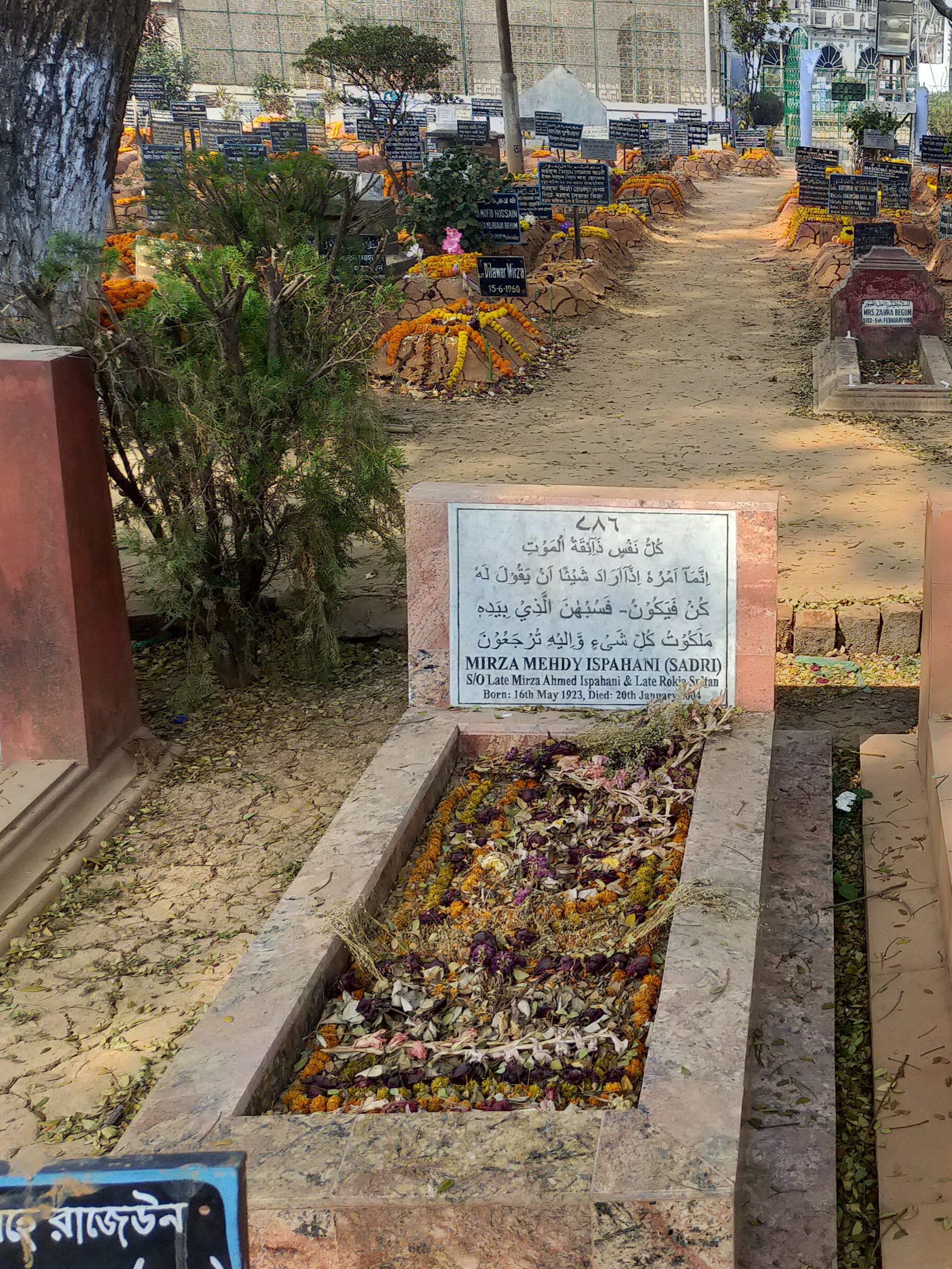
Grave of Mirza Mehdy Ispahani (1923–2004) at Hussaini Dalan, Dhaka

== See also ==
- Yar Mohammad Khan
- Ispahani family
