= 840 (film) =

- Promotional poster
- ৮৪০
- Directed by: Mostofa Sarwar Farooki
- Written by: Mostofa Sarwar Farooki
- Produced by: Nusrat Imrose Tisha
- Starring: Nasir Uddin Khan; Marzuk Russell; Bijori Barkatullah; Zakia Bari Mamo; Shahriar Nazim Joy; Ashutosh Sujan
- Cinematography: Sheikh Rajibul Islam
- Edited by: Tahsin Mahin
- Music by: Pavel Areen
- Production company: Chabial
- Release date: 13 December 2024 (Bangladesh)
- Running time: 2 hours 40 minutes
- Language: Bengali

840, also known as Democracy Private Limited, is a political satire Bengali film directed by Mostofa Sarwar Farooki. It was released in theatres across Bangladesh on 13 December 2024. According to the director, this film serves as a follow-up to his 2007 TV series 420, making 840 a 'double up' of that series.

== Casting ==
- Nasir Uddin Khan as Mayor Kazi Dablu
- Marzuk Russell as Jakir
- Fazlur Rahman Babu as Muzaffar
- Zakia Bari Mamo as District Commissioner
- Zayed Khan as Madhob Haldar
- Shahriar Nazim Joy as Kashem

== Plot ==
This film is being described as a sequel to Farooki's long-running series 420. Through the drama 420, the director attempted to narrate the rise and fall of Bangladeshi politics on a smaller scale. The series gained immense popularity at that time. According to the filmmaker, 840 is a "double-up" of 420. The film's scenes, and even dialogues, bear striking similarities to various actions of the previous government.

Regarding this, Farooki wrote in a Facebook post, "During the tenure of the previous caretaker government, I made 420. By some strange twist of fate, something mischievous like that is coming again, and this time under another interim government. I shot this during a period of fascism. I swear to God, after its release, don't think I somehow knew beforehand that there would be a caretaker government during this time! Otherwise, what courage did I have to make it?"

He further stated, "As viewers can understand from the trailer, we have managed to portray what Bangladesh was like during the previous government's tenure through the lens of a district town. We can call this an X-ray report of Awami misrule. I believe there will be more X-ray reports on this misrule in the future."

== Production ==
The film was shot in various locations, including Santahar,Naogaon , Diabari in Dhaka, Tejgaon, Foy's Lake in Chattogram, and Dubai in the United Arab Emirates. Filming began in November 2023 and concluded in February 2024. The film is produced by Nusrat Imrose Tisha and Impress Telefilm. Cinematography was handled by Sheikh Rajibul Islam, music direction by Pavel Areen, and sound design by Ripon Nath.
