= Dhaka Reporters Unity =

Journalist organization in Bangladesh

- Abbreviation: DRU
- Formation: 1995
- Headquarters: Segunbagicha, Dhaka, Bangladesh
- Region served: Bangladesh
- Official language: Bengali
- Leader: Abu Saleh Akon, President; Mynul Hasan Sohel, General Secretary
- Website: www.dru.com.bd

Dhaka Reporters Unity (Bengali: ঢাকা রিপোর্টার্স ইউনিটি) is the largest professional body of working reporters based in Segunbagicha, Dhaka, Bangladesh, representing all newspapers, electronic media and news organizations. Abu Saleh Akon is the President and Mynul Hasan Sohel is the General Secretary of Dhaka Reporters Unity.

== History ==
Dhaka Reporters Unity was established in 1995 and included reporters from both print, electronic media and new organization. The organization has 1800 members. It provides insurance for its members. The auditorium at the headquarters of Dhaka Reporters Unity is named after Sagar Sarowar and Meherun Runi, two journalists murdered in 2012.

In March 2025, the Dhaka Reporters Unity was attacked by a group of people led by an employee of the Karatoa Courier Service.

== Activity ==
The DRU that enters its 26th year organizes discourses, training programmes, workshops and intends to take some more specific and custom-made projects to enhance the professional expertise of the members. DRU launched the professional newsletter, ‘Reporters Voice’, to highlight activities in Bangladesh journalism and act as a springboard for debate and dissemination of activities related to the profession. DRU offers several awards each year for excellence in reporting in various fields of reporting. Best report winner getting finance support, certificate and crest.

== Welfare fund ==
The DRU arranged insurance coverage to all of its members from its own fund. In case of natural death of a member, his/her family members are provided Tk.3,00,000 as insurance converge and Tk Tk 4,00,000 on accidental death while Tk.80,000 for treatment of acute sickness. The DRU also awarding of Tk. 36,000 as annual stipend for one children of a deceased member for study up to master’s level. It provides receptions to the member's children, who passed HSC, SSC, JSC and PEC successfully.

== See also ==
- Bangladesh Federal Union of Journalists
- Dhaka Reporters Unity
- Economic Reporters Forum (ERF)
- National Press Club (Bangladesh)

== Executive committee ==
Executive Committee (2026)
Office	Name
President	Abu Saleh Akon
Vice President	Mahde Azad Masum
General Secretary	Mynul Hasan Sohel
Joint Secretary	Mohammed Jafar Iqbal
Finance Secretary	Niaz Mahmud Sohel
Organizing Secretary	M M Jasim
Office Secretary	Md. Rashim (Rashim Molla)
Woman Affairs Secretary	Jannatul Fardush Panna
Publicity and Publication Secretary	Mizan Chowdhury
Information Technology and Training Secretary	Mahmud Sohel
Sports Secretary	Omar Faruque Rubel
Cultural Secretary	Md. Monowar Hossain
Entertainment Secretary	Aminul Haque Bhuiyan
Welfare Secretary	Rafiq Mridha
Executive Member	Md. Akter Hosen
Executive Member	Ali Azam
Executive Member	Mahfuz Sadi
Executive Member	Al-Amin Azad
Executive Member	Mohammad Naymuddin
Executive Member	Sumon Chowdhury
Executive Member	Md. Abdul Alim
