= Kamal Ahmed (Bangladeshi journalist) =

- Occupation: Journalist
- Known for: Consulting Editor of The Daily Star and chairperson the Media Reform Commission of the Interim government led by Muhammad Yunus

Kamal Ahmed is a Bangladeshi journalist who serves as the consulting editor of The Daily Star. He was the chairperson the Media Reform Commission of the Interim government led by Muhammad Yunus.

== Career ==
Ahmed began his journalism career at Dainik Desh and later worked with several national and international media organisations, including The Daily Star, The Telegraph, and The Financial Express, where he served as chief sub-editor. He also contributed to the Himal Southasian. He worked at BBC World Service in London, where he served as editor of the Bengali Service and later as a senior producer. During his tenure, he produced and presented news programmes and chaired over 100 editions of BBC Bangladesh Sanglap. He moderated mayoral debates broadcast nationally in collaboration with the Bangladesh Election Commission. He worked with United Nations Radio, where he launched its first Bangla-language service and produced weekly programmes for nearly a decade.

Ahmed wrote in support of Professor Muhammad Yunus in September 2023. He blamed the Bangladesh Election Commission for holding "one sided elections" that led to the Awami league winning. He wrote about corruption by Benazir Ahmed, former Inspector General of Police, perks of members of parliament, and about United States sanctions on government officials in The Daily Star in May 2024.

After the fall of the Sheikh Hasina-led Awami League government, Ahmed was appointed chairperson the Media Reform Commission of the Interim government led by Muhammad Yunus. The commission submitted its recommendations in March 2025 to Muhammad Yunus. In December 2025, as chief of the Media Reform Commission, he stated that none of the commission’s recommendations had been implemented, citing bureaucratic resistance and a lack of political will. Ahemd served as consulting editor of Prothom Alo before joining The Daily Star as consulting editor in September 2025.

Ahmed is a consulting editor at The Daily Star. In May 2026, speaking at a World Press Freedom Day event in Dhaka organized by UNESCO and Transparency International Bangladesh, he commented on declining media credibility in Bangladesh, attributing it to ownership influence, economic pressures, and the spread of misinformation.
