= Khwaja Nooruddin =

- خواجہ نور الدین

Member of the Bengal Legislative Assembly
- In office 1946–1947
- Preceded by: Abul Hassan Isphani
- Constituency: South Calcutta

Personal details
- Born: 1900 Dacca, Bengal Presidency
- Died: 1971 (aged 70–71)
- Party: All-India Muslim League

Khwaja Nooruddin was a member of the Dhaka Nawab family, journalist and politician. He was the founder of The Star of India, The Musalman, and The Morning New. He was a member of the Bengal Legislative Assembly. He along with Abdur Rahman Siddiqui and Abul Hassan Isphani were considered the most trusted lieutenants of Muhammad Ali Jinnah, founder of Pakistan, in Bengal. He was one of the organizers of Mohammedan SC (Kolkata).

== Early life and family ==
Nooruddin was born in 1900 to Khwaja Mohammad Ashrafuddin of the Nawab family of Dhaka and Chanda Begum of Lucknow. His paternal fourth-cousin, and brother-in-law was Khwaja Nazimuddin. His father's first wife was Nawabzadi Badshah Bano, the second daughter of Khwaja Ahsanullah.

== Career ==
Nooruddin was elected to the Council of the Bengal Provincial league Council and served as an alderman of Kolkata.

In 1938, Nooruddin was the chairman of the board of trustees of the Mohammedan SC (Kolkata) who oversaw the construction of the field of the club.

In 1947, Nooruddin established the East Pakistan Sports Federation in Calcutta and served as its general secretary. After the dormant organisation was merged with the East Pakistan Sports Federation, he served as vice-president.

Nooruddin created two English language newspapers, The Musalman, and The Morning New. They were the first English language newspapers in India to represent the Muslim community.

From 1946 to 1947, Nooruddin was a member of the Bengal Legislative Assembly. He moved the publication of Morning News to Dhaka after the Partition of Bengal in 1948.

== Personal life ==
He married Najma Nooruddin and had one daughter named Sharmin Nooruddin, Sharmin Nooruddin married Aftab Malik.

== Death ==
Nooruddin died in 1971.
