= Mirza Ahmed Ispahani High School =

- মির্জা আহমেদ ইস্পাহানি উচ্চ বিদ্যালয়

Location
- Pahartali, A K Khan gate Chittagong, 4202; Bangladesh; 22.3637°N 91.7856°E

Information
- Established: 1987
- Founder: Mirza Mehdy Ispahani
- School district: Chittagong Education Board
- Enrollment: 2000
- Language: Bengali
- Campus size: 15 acres
- Campus type: Urban
- Colors: Yellow, Green, Red and Purple
- Sports: Football, Cricket, Basketball, Chess
- Website: maihs.edu.bd

Mirza Ahmed Ispahani High School (Bengali: মির্জা আহমেদ ইস্পাহানি উচ্চ বিদ্যালয়) is a school in Pahartali Thana, Chittagong, Bangladesh, for nursery through class X.

== History ==
The school was founded on 12 March 1987 by Mirza Mehdy Ispahani, then chairman of M. M. Ispahani Limited.

== Extracurricular activities ==
Every year MAIHS arranges sports week and prize giving ceremony and cultural function in the month of February in its playground.
