= Abdur Rahman Siddiqui =

Pakistani politician, businessman and journalist (1887–1953)

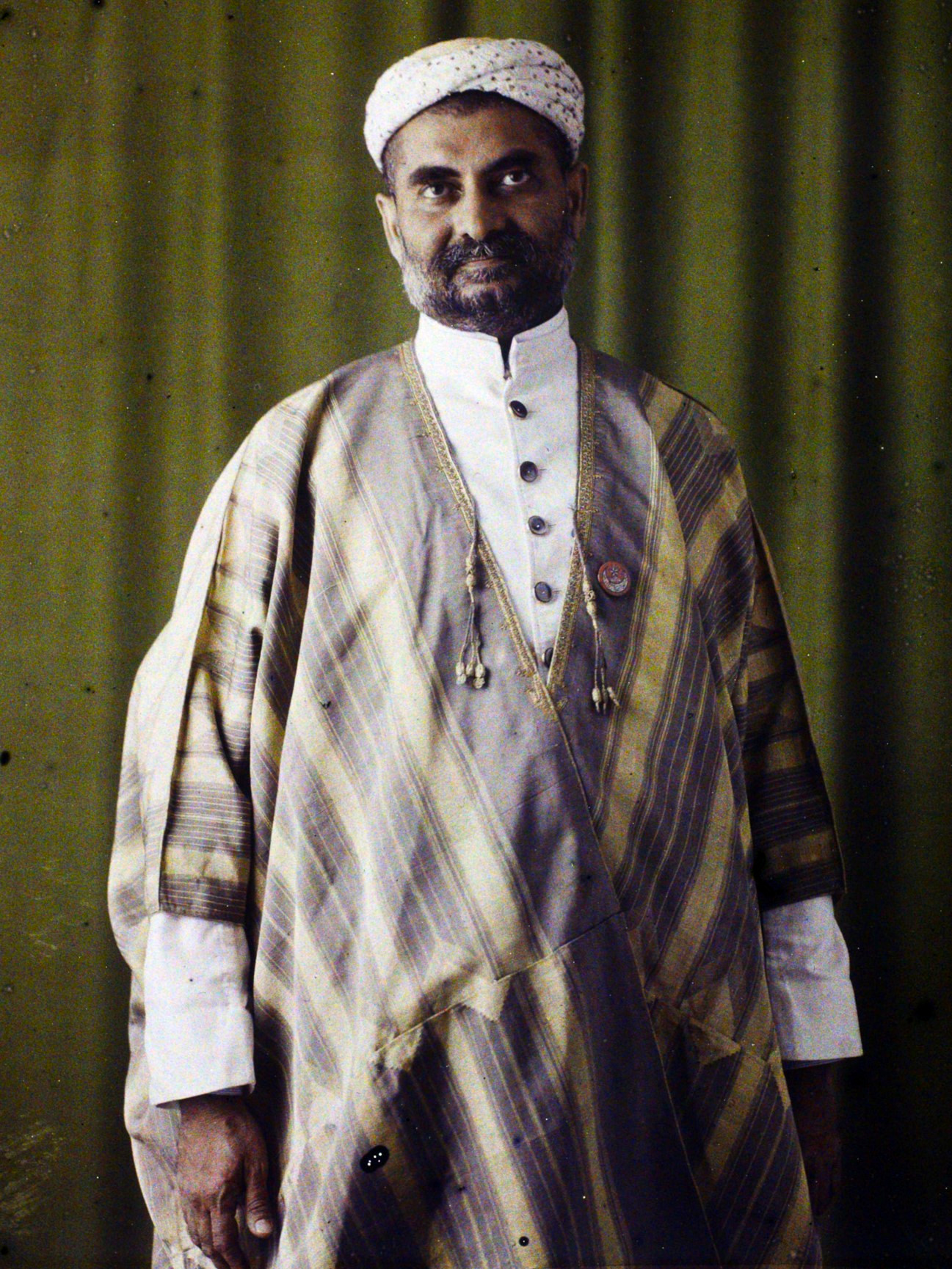
- 1921 Autochrome by Georges Chevalier

Governor of East Bengal (acting)
- In office 25 July 1952 – 10 November 1952
- Preceded by: Feroz Khan Noon
- Succeeded by: Feroz Khan Noon

Mayor of Calcutta
- In office 24 April 1940 – 28 April 1941
- Preceded by: Nitish Chandra Sen
- Succeeded by: Phanindra Nath Barma

Member of the Bengal Legislative Assembly
- In office 1937–1945
- Constituency: Chamber of Commerce

Personal details
- Born: 1887
- Died: 1953 (aged 65–66)
- Party: All-India Muslim League
- Education: Aligarh University

Abdur Rahman Siddiqui (Urdu: عبد الرحمن صدیقی; 1887 – 1953) was an East Pakistani politician, businessman and journalist. He was the acting Governor of East Pakistan for three and a half months in 1952 while Feroz Khan Noon was on leave.

== Education ==
He graduated from Aligarh Muslim University and travelled to England for further education.

== Career ==
After completing his education, Siddiqui joined The Comrade, a journal published by Mohammad Ali Jouhar. He was the managing editor of the journal, which was published from Calcutta. Siddiqui involved himself in the Khilafat Movement and volunteered as a medic in the Balkan Wars. He was one of the founding members of the All-India Muslim League and a key participator of the Pakistan Movement. Siddiqui contested in the 1937 Bengal legislative elections, winning in the Chamber of Commerce constituency. In 1940, he was elected Mayor of Calcutta. He preserved his seat at the 1946 Bengal legislative elections.

He along with Khwaja Nooruddin initiated the publication of The Morning News in Calcutta of which he was the editor from 1942 to 1948. Siddiqui was also one of the founders of Eastern Federal Insurance Company.

== Death ==
Siddiqui died in 1953.

== See also ==
- List of Pakistanis

Preceded by Feroz Khan Noon	Governor of East Bengal; 25 July 1952 – 10 November 1952	Succeeded by Feroz Khan Noon
