= Tangia Zaman Methila =

Bangladeshi model and beauty pageant titleholder

- তানজিয়া জামান মিথিলা
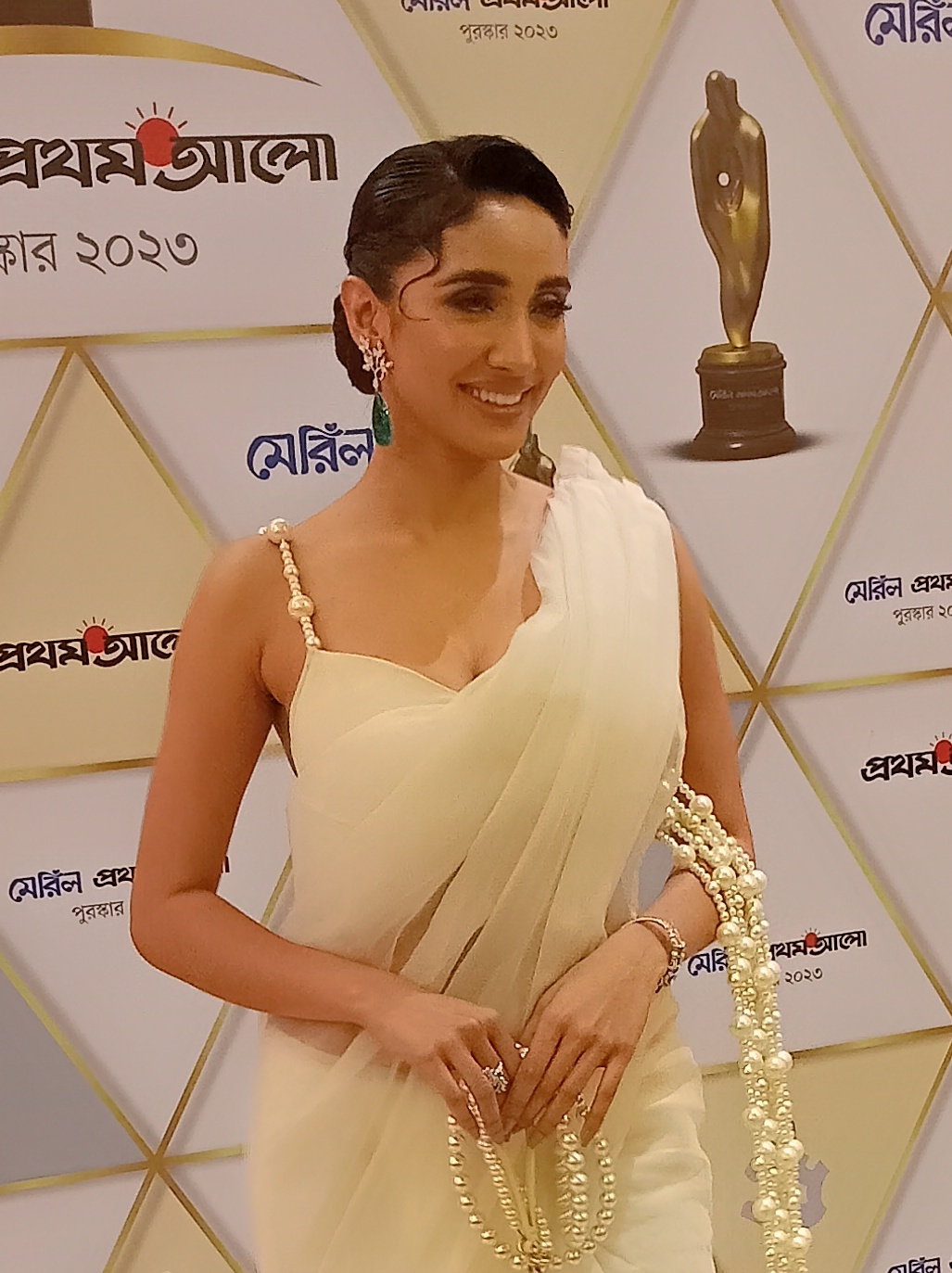
- Zaman in 2024
- Born: Tangia Zaman Methila; 31 January 1992 (age 34); Magura, Bangladesh
- Beauty pageant titleholder
- Title: Miss Universe Bangladesh 2020; Miss Universe Bangladesh 2025
- Major competitions: Miss Universe Bangladesh 2020 (Winner); Miss Universe 2020 (Did not compete); Miss Universe Bangladesh 2025 (Re-crowned); Miss Universe 2025 (Top 30)

Tangia Zaman Methila is a Bangladeshi model and beauty pageant titleholder who won Miss Universe Bangladesh 2020. She was re-crowned as Miss Universe Bangladesh 2025 and represented Bangladesh at Miss Universe 2025 where she reached the Top 30.

== Pageantry ==
=== Miss Supranational Bangladesh 2019 ===
Methila won Miss Supranational Bangladesh 2019. She had the right to represent Bangladesh in Miss Supranational 2019, but withdraw from the competition.

=== Miss Universe Bangladesh 2020 and Miss Universe 2020 ===
Methila won Miss Universe Bangladesh on 5 April 2020, in the Radisson Blu Dhaka Water Garden. She was to represent Bangladesh at Miss Universe 2020 on 16 May 2021, but did not compete due to the COVID-19 pandemic.

=== Miss Universe Bangladesh 2025 and Miss Universe 2025 ===
Methila was re-crowned as Miss Universe Bangladesh 2025. She was to represented Bangladesh at Miss Universe 2025 in Thailand, and reached the top 30.

== Awards ==
- Miss Universe Bangladesh 2020
- Best International Female Model, Paris Fashion Week 2022

== Filmography ==
Key
†	Denotes films that have not yet been released

- All films are in Bangladeshi Bengali-language, unless otherwise noted.

Year	Film	Role	Notes	Ref.
2021	Rohingya - People from Nowhere	Husnaara	Hindi film	
2025	Thursday Night	Mithila	Released on Chorki	
2026	Rockstar	Elena		

Awards and achievements
Preceded by Shirin Akter Shila	Miss Universe Bangladesh; 2020	Succeeded by Incumbent
