= Economic Reporters Forum (Bangladesh) =

Economic Reporters Forum (ERF)
- Abbreviation: ERF
- Formation: 1992
- Headquarters: 87 Purana Paltan Line, Paltan Tower, Lift-3, Culvert Road, Purana Paltan, Dhaka
- Location: Dhaka, Bangladesh
- Region served: Bangladesh
- Official language: Bengali
- Leader: Doulot Akter Mala, President & Abul Kashem (Journalist), Secretary
- Website: erfbd.com

Economic Reporters Forum (ERF) is a professional organization of journalists in Bangladesh who report on business, economy, trade, banking, finance, and development issues. It is based in Dhaka and works to improve economic journalism through professional development, training, research, and advocacy. The forum also promotes cooperation among economic journalists and encourages accurate and responsible reporting on economic affairs.

== History ==
Economic Reporters Forum was established in 1992 by a group of journalists covering economic and business news in Bangladesh. Since its founding, it has become one of the country's leading organizations for economic journalists. A. H. M. Moazzem Hossain was the founding president of ERF.

The forum regularly organizes seminars, workshops, training programs, and discussions on national and international economic issues. It also works with government agencies, financial institutions, universities, international organizations, and development partners to strengthen the skills of economic reporters.

== Objectives ==
The main objectives of the Economic Reporters Forum include:

- Promoting professional standards in economic journalism.
- Providing training and capacity-building opportunities for journalists.
- Encouraging accurate, balanced, and responsible reporting on economic issues.
- Protecting the professional interests and rights of economic journalists.
- Creating a platform for discussion on national and global economic developments.

== Activities ==
The Economic Reporters Forum organizes a wide range of activities, including:

- Training workshops on economic and financial reporting.
- Seminars and round-table discussions on public policy and the economy.
- Press briefings with government officials, economists, and business leaders.
- Research and publication on journalism and economic issues.
- Networking events for journalists and media professionals.

The forum also hosts dialogue sessions with policymakers, business organizations, banks, and international agencies to improve public understanding of economic issues.

== Membership ==
Membership of the Economic Reporters Forum is generally open to professional journalists who regularly report on economic, business, financial, trade, banking, or development news for newspapers, television, radio, online news portals, and news agencies. Members elect the forum's executive committee through regular elections.

== Governance ==
The forum is managed by an elected executive committee headed by a president and a general secretary. Other elected members assist in carrying out the organization's activities and implementing its programs.

== Executive committee ==
Executive Committee 2025-26
Office	Name	Affiliation
President	Doulot Akter Mala	Special Correspondent, The Financial Express
Vice President	Md. Ashraful Islam	Special Correspondent, Daily Naya Diganto
General Secretary	Abul Kashem	Special Correspondent, The Business Standard
Assistant General Secretary	Manik Muntasir	Senior Reporter, Bangladesh Pratidin
Finance Secretary	Md. Aminul Islam	Special Correspondent, Bangladesh Sangbad Sangstha (BSS)
ICT & Training Secretary	Sk. Shafayat Hossain	Chief Reporter, Daily Share Biz
Executive Member	ASM Moinul Haque	Special Correspondent, New Age
Executive Member	Kayes Mohammad Sohel	Freelance journalist
Executive Member	Md. Jakir Hussain	Senior Reporter, The Ajkaler Khabor
Executive Member	Ibrahim Hossain (Ovi)	Chief Reporter, Jagonews24.com

== See also ==
- Bangladesh Federal Union of Journalists
- Dhaka Reporters Unity
- National Press Club (Bangladesh)
