= Marzuk Russell =

Bangladeshi poet, lyricist, actor, model

- মারজুক রাসেল
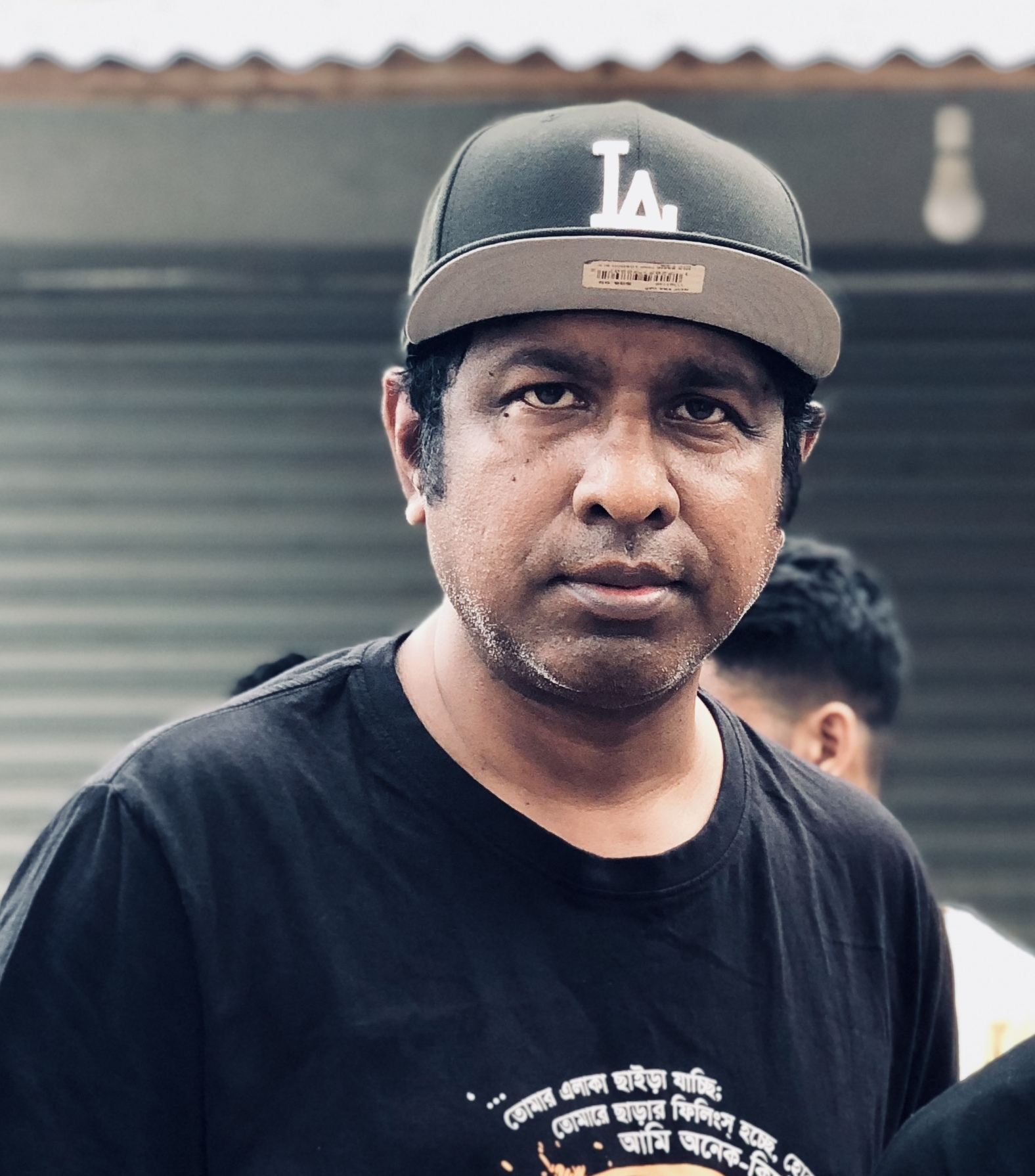
- Russell in 2023
- Born: 15 August 1973 (age 52); Gopalganj, Bangladesh
- Occupations: poet; model; actor
- Years active: 1993-present

Marzuk Russell (born 15 August 1973) is a Bangladeshi actor, writer, and lyricist. He made his television debut in the TV play Ayna Mohol in the year 2000. He got mainstream acclaim after the self-titled role in the film Bachelor in 2004. He went on hiatus after that success and only did some minor roles in TV dramas.

His breakthrough came again by playing the role of "Pasha", a criminal who got bailed, in the comedy drama Bachelor Point.Since then he has acted in many television dramas and worked for numerous television commercials. Marzuk also appeared on several music videos, such as Ghuri Tumi Kar Akashe Oro (2012), Smrity Katha (2017) etc. He is also praised for writing many popular songs like Didha (2009), Mirabai (1999) and Tomar Chokh Dekhle (2007).

== Early life and education ==
Marzuk Russell was born on August 15, 1973, in his mother's village at Gopalganj District, Bangladesh. He grew up in Daulatpur, Khulna. His father worked at a jute mill in Khulna. He attended Govt. Krishnamohan Primary School; after elementary school, his father decided to enroll him in a madrasa. He started writing poems while studying in the eighth class of Madrasa. In 1993, he moved to Dhaka.

== Career ==
=== Acting ===
In the early 2000s, Marzuk started acting in the television play Ayna Mohol directed by Mostofa Sarwar Farooki. He continues to collaborate with Farooki to this day.

=== Literature ===
Marzuk's first poem was published in "Janabarta," a local magazine from Khulna. He subsequently started freelance-writing in different newspapers and magazines. His first published poetry was Shanting Chara Songjog Nishidhwa. He then wrote three poetry respectively, Chander Budir Boyosh Jokhon Sholo (2003), Bainji Bari Road, and Chotto Kothay Tennis Ball. "Alternative" is one of the most popular poetry of his creation.

== Bibliography ==
Title	Bengali Title	Year	Publisher	Notes
Shanting Chara Shongjog Nishiddha	শান্টিং ছাড়া সংযোগ নিষিদ্ধ	2000		
Chader Burir Boyosh Jokhon Sholo	চাঁদের বুড়ির বয়স যখন ষোলো	2003	Hawlader Prokashoni	
Baiji Bari Road	বাঈজি বাড়ি রোড	2003	Ananya	
Chotto Kothay Tennis Ball	ছোট্ট কোথায় টেনিস বল	2005	Anyaprokash	ISBN 9848683356
Dehobontonbishoyok Dipokkhio Chukti Sakkhor	দেহবণ্টনবিষয়ক দ্বিপক্ষীয় চুক্তি স্বাক্ষর	2020	52	ISBN 9789849482420
Hawa Dekhi, Batash Khai	হাওয়া দেখি, বাতাস খাই	2022	Upkotha Prokashon	

== Filmography ==
Title	Year	Role	Notes
Boro Vai	2001	Boro Vai	
Bachelor	2004	Marzuk	First Feature Film appearance
Made in Bangladesh	2007	Sadekur Rahman	
Shapludu	2019	Kibria	
Ratrir Jatri	2019	Cousin	
840	2024	Jakir	

=== As lyricist ===
Singer	Songs
James	Hauzi; Rakhe Allah Mareke (with Marzuk Russel and Sumon); De Dour; Potro Dio (with Marzuk Russel and Loknath); Kotha Noy Mukhemukhe (with Mesher Mondol, Loknath and Marzuk Russel); Epitaph (Je Din Bondhu) (with Marzuk Russel, Mesher Mondol and Loknath); Mirabai (with Marzuk Russel and Mesher Mondol); Pakhi Ure Ja (with Marzuk Russel and Loknath); Ha-du-du (with Mesher Mondol, Loknath and Marzuk Russel); Sharabe Sharab (with Marzuk Russel, Loknath and Mesher Mondol); Jaat Jay (with Mesher Mondol, Loknath and Marzuk Russel); Sadakalo; Dukkho Urai; Ter Nodi Satsamuddur; Shuru Holo Valobasha; Chawa Pawa; Prem Jamunar Kole
Aurangzeb Babu	Phul Tokka; Chondro Mollika; Sokhi Tumi Kar; Dhun Hoy Ferar Shomoy; Pakha Gajabe; Porajito Soinik; Tumi Eshechile; Bodhua; Hasle Tumi; Shondhya; Aro Kichu; Manush Chena Day; Valo Thakar Upay Nei
Hasan Masood	Ekti Porir Golpo; Ki Karone; Kon Ke Keno; Phul Bonamali; Beshe Jawar Gan; Porinoti; Ultorothe; She; Ajkal Tomake
Ayub Bachchu	Bonolota Sen; La-La-Na; Mone Ache Naki Nai; Phisphashphis; Cleopatra; Bishesh Dine Bishesh Tumi; Bhabsutra; Ishaan Koner Bayu; Tomar Chokhe Dekhle Bondhu; Ami To Preme Porini
Asif Akbar	Songe Nio; Sharaboshor Ashar-Srabon; Pagla Ghora; Khun; Nari; Jolkanna; Mil; Iti; Foo; Baundule; Bokbok Togbog; Machh O Boroshi; Sadarghater Pan; Ebarer Chhuti; Jhuki Nile Shuki; Mukhostho Koro; Lamppost; Sobar Bangladesh; Nichutan
Partha Barua	Separation; To-let
Hasan (Ark)	Jaye Hariye Jaye
Habib Wahid	Didha
Nancy	Dolna; Didha
Arfin Rumey	Dolna; Hijibiji
Pantha Kanai	Golla; Dam; Ekdin; Ahladi; Red Signal; Karo Somoy
Tishma	Dotana Tintana; Chander Meye Josna Ami; Brishti Tomar Paye Pori
Bappa Mazumder	Bangladesher Grishsho
Kumar Bishwajit	Ichchhe Korei Hari
Nasir	Diner Belay Rashta Bondho
Sanbhim	Purte Chaile
Leemon	Ami Kaar?
Niger Sumi	Omon Polare
Momtaz Begum	Ami Tomar Director

== Television ==
Title	Year	Character	Director	Note
Aynamohol	2000	-Marzuk	Mostofa Sarwar Farooki	video-fiction
Choruivati	2002	Marzuk	Mostofa Sarwar Farooki	tele-film
Khosru+Moyna	2004	Khosru	Mostofa Sarwar Farooki	tele-film
Kanamachhi	-	-	Mostofa Sarwar Farooki	
Swarborner Chokhe	-		Mostofa Sarwar Farooki	
Ekannoborty				First TV serial
Palabi Kothay				web series
Meow		-	Kochi Khandokar	
420	2007-2008	-	Mostofa Sarwar Farooki	TV series
69	2005	Saikat	Mostofa Sarwar Farooki	TV series
Jibon Theke Neowa	2007		Ishtiak Ahmed Rumel	
Sorry			Ishtiak Ahmed Rumel	
Foo	2009		Iftekhar Ahmed Fahmi	TV natok
Kobi	-	-	Mostofa Sarwar Farooki	
Murubbi	-	-		
Osthir Premik	-	-		
Capten	-	-		
House Full	2008-2009	Sujon	Redoan Rony, Iftekhar Ahmed Fahmi	Comedy-drama series
Bishaash	2010	Wrestler 1 & 2		
Relation	2013		Pallab Biswas	
Average Aslam	2015		Sagor Jahan	
BCS Bangla First and Second Paper	2014			
Mr Tension	2018			
Fatman Fantastic	2018		Sagor Jahan	
Chati Roise	2018	Chati Roise	Zubier Anan	
Bachelor Point	2018 - Present	Pasha	Kajal Arefin Ome	Comedy, Drama
Lamp Post	2018		Sagor Jahan	
The Director	2019			web film
Mar Guriye	2019	Big brother	Preity Datta	drama series, Deepto TV
Girlfriend Er Khoje?	2020		S R Mazumder	
Stadium	2020	Danny Uncle	Kajal Arefin Ome	web natok
Mask	2020		Kajal Arefin Ome	
Hawai Mithai	2020		Noyeem Imtiaz Neyamul	Drama Series, NTV
Amar Oporadh Ki?	2020		Mabrur Rashid Bannah	
Shefalir Premikera	2021		Sagor Jahan	
Thanda	2021	Sobuj	Kajal Arefin Ome	web film
House No.96	2021		Mahmudur Rahman Hime	Drama Series, NTV
Ilish Mach	2021	Boro Vai	Maidul Rakib	VisualScene ENTERTAINMENT
Online Offline	2021-2022		Sagor Jahan	
Girls Squad	2021		Khaled Sajeeb & Sanjoy Somadder	TV series with Samonty Shoumi, Sharna Lata, Samira Khan Mahi, Jarin Tasnim Antara, Rukaiya Jahan Chamak, Nabila Binta Islam, Chashi Alam
Sobhan Shaheber Flat	2021		Mehedi Hasan Hridoy	
Atonko	2021		Maidul Rakib	
Jobai	2021		Maidul Rakib	
Female	2021		Kajal Arefin Ome	
Tikka	2022		Sagor Jahan	
Bhai Bhai	2022		Sagor Jahan	
Ural Dibo Akashe	2022	Togor	Sagor Jahan	
Icche	2022		Nazmul Hassan	
House Cleaner	2022		Smak Azad	
Apnar Bibek Ki Bole?	2022		Jakiul Islam Ripon	
Surprise	2022		Jakiul Islam Ripon	
Tandoori Chicken	2022		Mehedi Rony	
Doi	2022		Kajal Arefin Ome	
Female 2	2022		Kajal Arefin Ome	
Moti Pagla	2023		Tuhin Hossain	
Premrog Niramoy Kendro	2023		Maruf Mithu	
Thaba Party	2023		Jakiul Islam Ripon	
DJ Buar Boyfriendra	2023		Julfikar Islam Shishir	
Ural Debo Akashe	2023		Sagor Jahan	
Bokkor	2023		Sagor Jahan	
Bhai Bhai 2	2023		Sagor Jahan	
Tikka Returns	2023		Sagor Jahan	
Kethay Koiche Hobe Na Je?	2023		Sagor Jahan	
Surela Sultan	2023		Sagor Jahan	
Bokkor 2	2023		Sagor Jahan	
Team West Indies	2023		Maidul Rakib	
Living Legend	2023		Maidul Rakib	
Char Chakkor	2023		Nazrul Islam Raju	
Hulosthul	2023		Sagor Jahan	
Bhalobashar Oli Goli	2023		Sagor Jahan	
Ghori	2023		Ishtiak Ahmed Rumel	
Female 3	2023		Kajal Arefin Ome	
Kipta Family	2023		Maidul Rakib	
Love Road	2024		B. U. Shuvo	TV series with Zaher Alvi and Samonty Shoumi
Bhai Bhai 3	2024		Sagor Jahan	
Sompotti	2024		Maidul Rakib	
Ajaira Kota	2024		Maidul Rakib	
School Boys	2024		Zubair Ibn Bakar	
Ekti Premer Upakkhan	2024		Tareq Reza Rahman Sarker	
Abar Dawat: Hakulla 2	2024		Ishtiak Ahmed Rumel	
Backup Dancer	2024		Maidul Rakib	
C Company	2024		Anisur Rahman Razib	
Ekhane Size Kora Hoy	2024		Jakiul Islam Ripon	
Tikka Revenge	2024		Sagor Jahan	
Female 4	2024		Kajal Arefin Ome	

== Web series ==
Year	Title	OTT	Character	Director	Notes
2017	Palabi Kothay			AK Porag and Vaskar Dey Jony	
2020	Sub - Sublet			Sakib Rayhan	
2020	Bodmaish Polapain		Maqbool Sir	Mabrur Rashid Bannah	
2023	Hotel Relax			Kajal Arefin Ome	

== Discography ==
Title	Album	Year	Singer
De Dour; Bioscoper Khela; Rakhe Allah Mare Ke; Housey	Lais Fita Lais	1998	James
Jat Jay; Kotha; Sharabe Sharab; Pakhi Ure Ja; Potro Dio; Mira Bai	Thik Achhe Bondhu	1999	James
Tero Nodi Sat Somuddur	Brihaspati	-	James
Sobar Bangladesh	Hridoye Roktokhoron	-	Asif Akbar
Tumi Hariye Jawar Somoy Amay Songe Nio	Pashani	2003	Asif Akbar
Nari	Fish Fash Fish	-	Asif Akbar
Ekti Porir Golpo; Ki Karone; Kon Kee Keno; Phool Bonomali; Vese Jaoar Gaan; Porinoti; Ulto Rothe; She; Shishutosh; Aajkal Tomake	Hridoughotito	2007	Hasan Masood
Ful Tokka	Shokhi Tumi Kaar	2016	Marjuk Rasel

- Ha Do Do performed by James
- Vashbo Je Jole (Prem Jomunar Kule) performed by James
- Lolona performed by Ayub Bachchu
- Tomar Cokhe Dekhle performed by Ayub Bachchu
- Baundule performed by Asif Akbar (2016)
- Mil performed by Asif Akbar
- Myth performed by Asif Akbar
- Jolkonna performed by Asif Akbar
- Foo (2018) performed by Asif Akbar
- Purte Chaile
- Bhab Sutra (2019) performed by Ayub Bachchu
