= Bongo BD =

Bangladeshi media company

Bongo Holdings PTE LTD
- Trade name: Bongo BD
- Industry: Digital media, video technology, YouTube services and content production
- Founded: 2013
- Founder: Ahad Mohammad, Navidul Huq and Fayaz Taher
- Headquarters: Dhaka, Bangladesh
- Website: bongobd.com

Bongo established in 2013, is Bangladesh's pioneer and largest video-on-demand streaming service. The platform commenced with the streaming of classic content on its YouTube channel, starting in January 2014.

== History ==
Bongo BD was established in 2013 by Ahad Mohammad and Navidul Huq, and later collaborated with Grameenphone to introduce the Bioscope over-the-top media service in 2016.

In August 2017, the Bioscope live TV and video-on-demand app was launched.

Initially, Bongo BD operated on a subscription revenue model complemented by advertisement income. However, in a response to the COVID-19 pandemic, the platform made all of its content free for users in Bangladesh starting in March 2020. This move garnered substantial success, leading to over 100 million subscribers and an impressive 1 billion monthly views by May of the same year. In July, Bongo BD reintroduced its subscription fees, offering free and premium content.

== Contents ==
=== Bongo OTT Content Categories ===
- Live TV
- Original Web Series
- Original Drama
- Telefilm / Telefictions
- Non Fiction Shows
- Turkish Drama
- Indian Movie Dubbed
- Chinese Drama
- Kids
- Shorts

=== Bongo original series ===
Title	Genre	Number of Seasons	Release year
Nonsense	Thriller, Crime	1	2025
Hulusthul	Comedy	1	2023
Hotel Relax	Comedy	1	2023
Open Kitchen	Drama	1	2023
Dom	Psychological Thriller	1	2022
Girls Squad	Comedy	2	2021-2022
Bongo BOB	Anthology	2	2021-2022
Musibot Reloaded	Comedy, Drama	1	2022
Beauty Tailors	Drama	1	2022
Doom	Thriller	1	2022
Biye Korte Giye	Comedy	1	2022
BnG	Comedy	1	2022
Mon Kaaba	Drama	1	2022
Dragon Gang	Comedy	1	2022
Paracetamol 500 mg	Comedy	1	2022
2 Mad Men	Thriller	1	2021
Lockdown	Drama	1	2020
Taka	Comedy	1	2020
Kuhok	Mystery, Crime	1	2019
Biye Korte Chai	Romance, Drama	1	2019
Gangstuber	Thriller, Drama	1	2019
Shondeher Obokash	Drama	1	2019
Plural No. 3rd Person	Comdedy	1	2019

=== Dubbed Series ===
Title	Genre	Language	Release year	Ref
Shikari	Thriller, Drama	Turkish	2023	
Akash Jure Megh	Romance, Drama	Turkish	2022	
Rehana	Romance, Drama, Family	Turkish	2022	
Sohosro Ek Rojoni	Romance, Drama, Family	Turkish	2021	
Put Your Head on My Shoulder (as Ei Mon Tomake Dilam)	Romance	Chinese	2023	
Goblin	Romance, Drama, Fantasy	Korean	2016	

=== Popular Drama and Telefilm ===
Title	Genre	Release year
Portrait	Mystery, Drama	2023
Kapurush	Romance	2023
The Pickup Artist	Romance	2023
Hawker	Comedy, Romance	2023
Love Century	Comedy, Romance	2023
Gulail	Romance	2023
Neera	Tragedy	2023
Ora Tin Jon	Comedy	2022
Yearmate	Romance	2022
Laaf	Romance	2022
Ajob Prem	Romance	2022
Gojodontini	Romance	2020
Ek Hridoyhina	Romance	2020
Case 3040	Thriller	2020
Ei Shohore	Family	2019
Miss Shiuly	Family	2019
Love Box	Romance	2019
22 she April	Tragedy	2019
Fapor	Romance, Comedy	2019
Amader Shomaj Biggan	Crime	2019

=== Sports ===
Event	Sports	Year
Fight Night Genesis	Boxing	2022

=== South Indian Movies Bangla Dubbed ===
Title	Original title	Genre
SinghoPurush	Theri	Action
Swapnabaj	Soorarai Potru	Biography
I-Virus	I	Science Fiction, Action, Romance, Thriller
Stranger	Anniyan	Action, Thriller
Revenge	Yevadu	Action, Thriller
Nyayjuddho	Sarkaru Vaari Paata	Action
Naropishach	Ratsasan	Psychological Thriller
Obhishap	Vaanam	Thriller
Marsal Superstar	Mersal	Action
Netri	Thalaivii	Biography
Genius	Maharshi	Family, Action
NGK	NGK	Action
V.I.P. 2	Velaiilla Pattadhari 2	Action
Project Mayajaal	Maayavan	Science Fiction Thriller
Kabali	Kabali	Action
Bhaskar Mastan	Bhaskar Oru Rascal	Action
Bidrohi	Karnan	Action
Dosh Abotar	Dasavatharam	Science Fiction Action

== Tech partnership ==
- Shikho
- GP
- Robi Airtel
- Astha

== Content Partnership ==
- Chingari (India)
- Walton
- Chorki
- Bioscope
- Haier

== Innovations ==
- BongoWal (An exclusive content portal for Walton)
- Shorts (App/Website embedded mini contents)

== See also ==
- List of Bangladeshi OTT platforms
