= Pakistan Jute Mills Association =

Pakistani governmental initiated industry

The Pakistan Jute Mills Association (PJMA) was founded in 1970 in an effort to reduce reliance on jute imports. The Government of Pakistan prioritised the development of the domestic jute industry. As a result, between 1964 and 1971, four jute mills were set up in the country, each with limited production capacity aimed at fulfilling the local demand for jute products.

== History of Jute Mills ==
In 1970, the Pakistan Industrial Development Corporation (PIDC) a program to supply government agencies with packaging materials for food grain storage. At the time, the jute industry relied heavily on raw jute imports from Bangladesh. Today, Pakistan's jute mills are fully equipped with spinning, weaving, and finishing facilities for producing hessian cloth and jute sacks. Key buyers of these jute products include government agencies, public sector corporations, and farmers, who primarily use jute sacks for the long-term storage of food grains such as sugar and wheat. Other commodities stored in jute sacks include rice, coffee, pulses, rapeseed, and cottonseed.

The jute industry in Pakistan employs over 30,000 workers and is fully capable of meeting the country’s demand for jute products. Additionally, jute mills, which are members of the Pakistan Jute Mills Association, export their products to markets around the world, including Sudan, the UK, UAE, Iran, Egypt, and Thailand.

== Governance ==
Election Results for the Office bearers/Executive Committee members of Pakistan Jute Mills Association for the year 2012–13, Malik Mohammad Jehangir, Executive Director of Indus Jute Mills Limited, Dhabeji, Karachi and White Pearl Jute Mills Limited, Hafizabad.

== Successes ==
Pakistan Jute Mills Association (PJMA) on regular basis make people aware that jute bag is environment friendly packing [hundred percent biodegradable and recyclable] for the agriculture commodities [especially grains] and the use of woven polypropylene bag is unfavorable for environment and ecology.

To meet the requirement of the jute mills Pakistan needs only 150,000 acres. Due to the government's decision to use polypropylene bags for procurement has resulted in the closure of five mills out of twelve jute mills of Pakistan. The leading members of PJMA and leading mills are Indus Jute Mills Limited, Dhabeji, Karachi and White Pearl Jute Mills Limited, Hafizabad, Punjab. PJMA launched initiative to convince farmers to sow jute to meet the demand and also to save $100 million annually on import. The association extended full support to the farmers (from plantation to marketing). PJMA also assured farmers regarding free seed provision and promised to provide them guidance. The association also assured farmers buying the whole produce at a better price compared to cotton.
