= The Morning News (Bangladeshi newspaper) =

Bangladeshi newspaper, published 1942–1975

- Type: Daily newspaper
- Founder: Khwaja Nooruddin
- Founded: 1942 (as a weekly newspaper)
- Ceased publication: 1975
- Political alignment: Right-wing
- Language: English
- Headquarters: Dhaka
- City: Calcutta (1942–1949); Dhaka (1949–1975)
- Country: Bangladesh
- OCLC number: 28626806

The Morning News was a right-wing English language newspaper and one of the first published from Dhaka.

== History ==
The Morning News started as a weekly English language newspaper in Kolkata. It was owned by Khwaja Nooruddin who was a relative of the Nawab of Dhaka, and Sir Khawaja Nazimuddin. It moved to Dhaka on 20 March 1949 following the Partition of India. On 25 December 1949, it started publishing as a daily newspaper. The editor of the newspaper was Badruddin. In 1960's, The National Press Trust, which was a government-owned organization, took over and operated directly a number of the more prominent newspapers. Among these were two of the three principal English-language newspapers, the Pakistan Times, which has the largest circulation, and the Morning News. On 24 January 1971, the offices of The Morning News and the other pro-Pakistan military junta newspaper, Dainik Pakistan, were burned down by protestors. On 2 March 1971, Pakistani soldiers shot at protesters outside the newspaper office at DIT intersection around 9:30 pm. After the Independence of Bangladesh in 1971 Shamsul Huda became the editor. The newspaper was banned in 1975 by the BAKSAL government.

== Ideology ==
The Morning News was supportive of the Muslim League faction led by Sir Khawaja Nazimuddin. The Morning News was against the Language Movement in 1952. It called the movement demanding Bengali be made the state language of Pakistan a conspiracy of Indians and Hindus. The newspaper took a communal stance.
