= Orient Airways =

Airline of Pakistan (1947–1955)

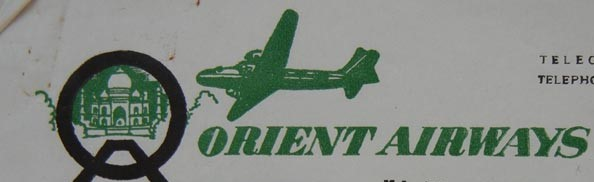
IATA	ICAO	Call sign
-	-	ORIENT
- Founded: 29 November 1946; 79 years ago
- Commenced operations: 4 June 1947; 79 years ago
- Ceased operations: 11 March 1955; 71 years ago Merged into Pakistan International Airlines
- Operating bases: Karachi; Dacca; Azad Jammu Kashmir
- Fleet size: 10 Douglas DC-3; 3 Convair 240
- Headquarters: Karachi, Pakistan
- Key people: Mirza Ahmad Ispahani (Chairman); Mirza Abol Hassan Ispahani (Managing Director); Captain T. Neville Stack (General Manager)

Orient Airways Ltd. (Urdu: اورینٹ ایَیر ویز لمیٹڈ) was an airline established in 1946 with its base in Calcutta, Bengal, British India. The airline shifted operations to the newly independent state of Pakistan in 1947, and was rechristened as Pakistan International Airlines in March 1955. It was the first and only Muslim owned airline in British Raj and flew from 1947 to 1955.

== History ==
The airline was registered in Calcutta, British Raj on 23 October 1946. The initial investment was provided by the Ispahani, Adamjee, and the Arag group. Mirza Ahmad Ispahani, being its first chairman, and Air Vice-Marshal O.K. Carter, the general manager, obtained an operating license in May 1947. Four Douglas DC-3s were obtained from Temple, Texas in February 1947 and operations first started on 4 June 1947.

Orient Airways, along with the help of some chartered BOAC aircraft, started relief operations and transportation of the population between Delhi and Karachi, the capitals of India and Pakistan, respectively. Later, Orient Airways transferred its base to Pakistan and established the vital link between Karachi and Dhaka (Dacca). With a skeleton fleet of just two DC-3s, three crew, and twelve mechanics, Orient Airways re-launched its scheduled operations. The initial routes were Karachi-Lahore-Peshawar, Karachi-Quetta-Lahore, and Karachi-Delhi-Kolkata-Dhaka. By the end of 1949, Orient Airways had acquired 10 DC-3s and three Convair 240s which it operated on these particular routes. In 1950, it had become increasingly apparent that additional capacity was needed to cater to the growing needs of the population.

On 11 March 1955, the government of Pakistan merged Orient Airways with other airlines to form Pakistan International Airlines.

== Livery ==
Orient Airways aircraft had a green strip with the word "Orient Airways" or "Orient Skyliner". The tail was marked with the flag of Pakistan after the independence on 14 August 1947.

== Fleet ==
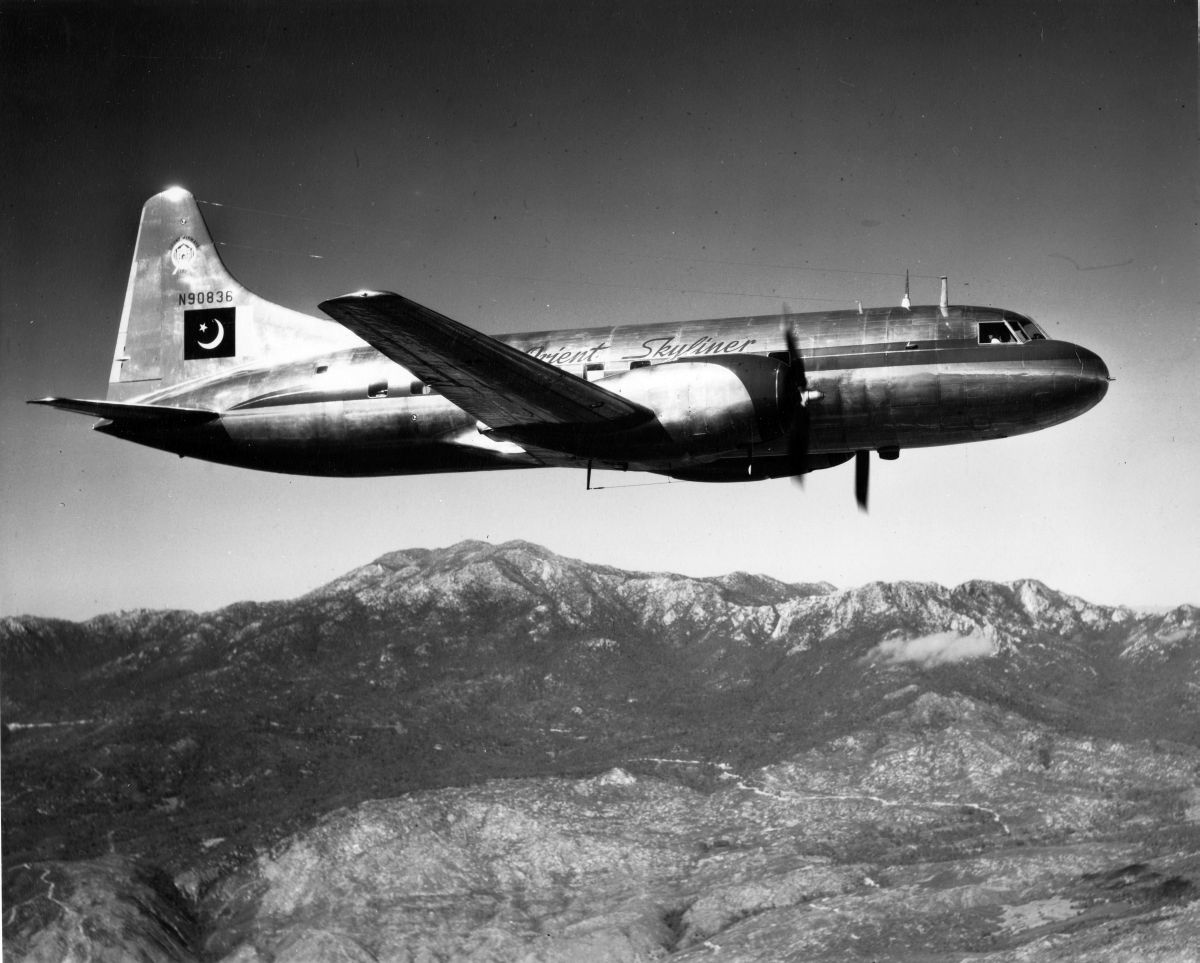
Orient Airways Convair CV-240 circa 1947

Orient Airways aircraft fleet consisted of the following aircraft. The aircraft had only Economy Class.

Aircraft	In service	Orders	Passengers	Notes
Convair CV-240-5	3	—	40	All aircraft are added into Pakistan International Airlines.
Douglas DC-3	10	—	25	All aircraft are added into Pakistan International Airlines.
Total	13	—		All aircraft are added into Pakistan International Airlines.

=== Former fleet ===
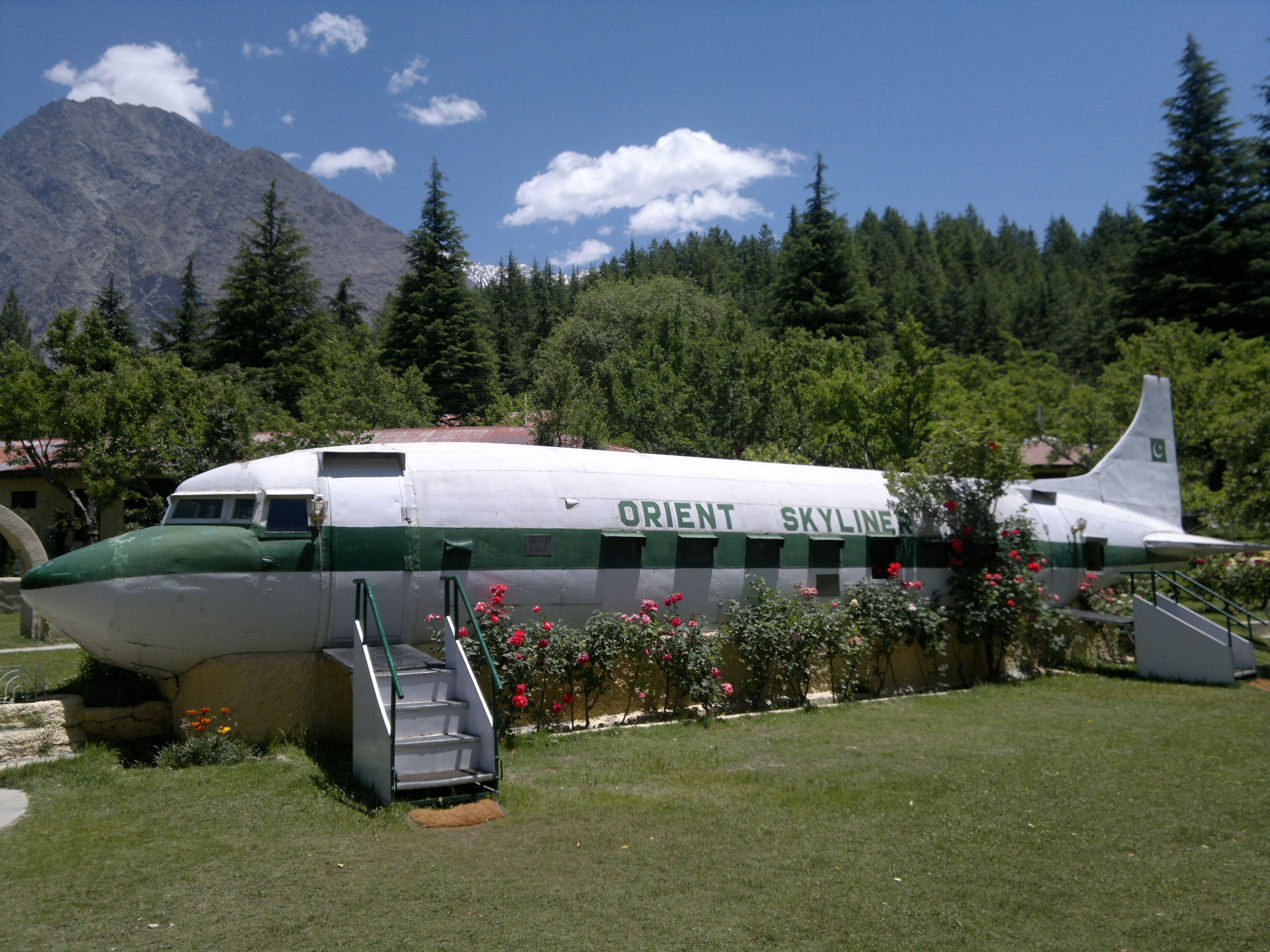
Orient Airways' crashed Douglas DC-3 is now a coffee shop at the Shangrila Resort in Skardu. Circa 1953.

Aircraft	Total	Introduced	Retired	Status
Douglas DC-3	1	1947	1953	1-crashed

== Services ==
=== Routes ===
The following return routes were advised by the board (1948):

- Karachi-Quetta-Lahore
- Karachi-Lahore-Rawalpindi-Peshawar
- Karachi-Delhi-Allahabad-Calcutta-Dacca-Chittagong
- Karachi-Ahmedabad-Bombay
- Karachi-Quetta-Zahidan-Meshad-Tehran

=== Other routes operating ===
- Karachi-Dacca-Delhi-Karachi (daily service since March 1952)
- Karachi-Dacca via Lahore (not sure if it stopped in Lahore on both legs)
- Karachi-Multan-Lahore & return (1952)
- Karachi-Delhi-Calcutta-?? (1949)

=== Airmail ===
Orient Airways was the designated local carrier for airmail throughout the country. It also carried mail to India. Its services to Dacca were supplemented by BOACs.

== Accidents and incidents ==
Orient Airways experienced has lost only two aircraft in crashes in 1952 and 1953 respectively.

1950s

- In October 1952, an Orient Airways cargo flight from Karachi to Dacca was crashed. One of three was killed in this crash.
- On Monday 3 August 1953, the Douglas DC-3 registered AP-AAD was operating on a hajj flight, carrying pilgrims from Karachi to Jeddah via Sharjah and Bahrain. The leg to Bahrain was to be flown by the first officer from the left-hand seat. Shortly after takeoff the aircraft entered a steep descending turn. The captain took over control but could not recover the aircraft. The Douglas DC-3 struck the ground. One of 25 was killed in this crash. "The accident resulted from the loss of control of the aircraft by the first officer shortly after taking off on a dark night when instrument flying was necessary. This loss of control was due to the inability of the first officer to fly on instruments. The responsibility for the accident is attributed to the captain for failing to supervise the piloting of the aircraft by the first officer."

== See also ==
- Adamjee Group
