= Vested Property Act (Bangladesh) =

Bangladeshi law

The Vested Property Act is a controversial law in Bangladesh that allows the government to confiscate property from individuals it deems as an enemy of the state. Before the independence of Bangladesh in 1971, it was known as the Enemy Property Act. In 1974 it was renamed the Vested Property Act. Later some efforts were made to repeal it.

== Legal history ==
This law is the culmination of several successive discriminatory laws against non-Muslims passed while Bangladesh was part of Pakistan.

Chronologically, they are:

- The East Bengal (Emergency) Requisition of Property Act (XIII of 1948)
- The East Bengal Evacuees (Administration of Property) Act (VIII of 1949)
- The East Bengal Evacuees (Restoration of Possession) Act (XXII of 1951)
- The East Bengal Evacuees (Administration of Immovable Property) Act (XXIV of 1951)
- The East Bengal Prevention of Transfer of Property and Removal of Documents and Records Act of 1952
- The Pakistan (Administration of Evacuees Property) Act (XII of 1957)
- The East Pakistan Disturbed Persons (Rehabilitation) Ordinance (No 1 of 1964)
- The Defence of Pakistan Ordinance (No. XXIII of 6 September 1965)
- The Defence of Pakistan Rules of 1965
- The Enemy Property (Custody and Registration) Order of 1965
- The East Pakistan Enemy Property (Lands and Buildings Administration and Disposal Order of 1966).
- The Enemy Property (Continuance of Emergency Provision) Ordinance No. 1 of 1969

After Bangladesh independence in 1971, similar laws were passed:

- Bangladesh (Vesting of Property and Assets) President's (Order No. 29 of 1972).
- The Enemy Property (Continuance of Emergency Provisions) (Repeal) Act (XLV of 1974)
- The Vested and Non-Resident Property (Administration) Act (XLVI of 1974)
- The vested and Non-Resident (Administration) (Repeal) Ordinance 1976 The Ordinance, (No. XCII of 1976).
- The Ordinance No. XCIII of 1976.

On 6 November 2008, the High Court division of the Supreme Court of Bangladesh delivered its rule nisi upon the government on the Enemy Property (Continuance of Emergency Provision) (Repeal) Act 1974 and subsequently promulgated Arpita Sampatty Protapyan Ain 2001 and circulars, administrative orders.

The order calls upon the respondent to show cause as to why instructions issued in the contents of presidential order 29 of 1972, Act 45 and 46 of 1974, ordinance No. 92, 93 of 1976, Arpita Sampatty Protapyan Ain 2001 and circulars issued by government that are in contradiction with the fundamental rights and the charter of declaration of Independence of Bangladesh, 10 April 1971, should not be declared to be ultra vires the constitution. The Rule Nisi also stated why the properties so far incorporated in the list as Enemy (Vested) should not be returned to the title holder/successor/legal possession holders and or such other or further order or orders passed as to this Court may seem fit and proper. The Rule is made returnable within 4 weeks from 28 October 2008.

== Renamed as Vested Property Act ==
Though renamed as the Vested and Non-Resident Property (Administration) Act in 1974, the law still retains the fundamental ability to deprive a Bangladeshi citizen of property simply by declaration of that person as an enemy of the state. Leaving the country through abandonment is a common reason for this. Hindu families who have one or several members leaving the country due to religious atrocities against Hindus, and economic as well as political reasons, have had their entire property confiscated due to labeling as enemy.

It appears that in many cases the real reason for violence against religious minorities is to pressure them to leave their lands in an attempt to take over these lands.

== Measurable impact ==
=== Prominent cases ===
Much of the property of murdered Hindu politician Dhirendranath Datta was confiscated by the Bangladesh government after independence in 1971. Because Datta's body was never found after he was arrested by the Pakistan Army during the Bangladesh Liberation War, an affidavit was brought forward that it could not be concluded that Datta had not voluntarily left the country.

The family property of Nobel Prize–winning economist Amartya Sen had been confiscated by the Pakistan government. In 1999, the Bangladesh government announced that it was investigating opportunities to return the property to Sen's family.

=== Barkat's seminal work ===
A seminal book by Professor Abul Barkat of Dhaka University, Inquiry into Causes and Consequences of Deprivation of Hindu Minorities in Bangladesh through the Vested Property Act, was published in 2000. This included 748,850 families dispossessed of agricultural land. The total amount of land lost by Hindu households as a result of this discriminatory act was estimated at 1.64 million acres (6,640 km^{2}), which is equivalent to 53 per cent of the total land owned by the Hindu community and 5.3 per cent of the total land area of Bangladesh.

The survey also showed that the beneficiaries of the land grab through the act cut across all party lines. The political affiliation of direct beneficiaries of appropriated property was:

- Bangladesh Awami League 44.2%
- Bangladesh Nationalist Party (BNP) 31.7%
- Jatiya Party 5.8%
- Jamaat-e-Islami 4.8%
- Others 13.5%

The greatest appropriation of Hindu property took place immediately after independence during the first Awami League government (1972–75) and during the first period of rule of the Bangladesh Nationalist Party (1976–1980). Barkat's work also showed that since 1948, 75% of the land of religious minorities in East Pakistan and subsequent Bangladesh had been confiscated through provisions of the act.

Barkat also emphasized that less than 0.4% of the population of Bangladesh has benefited from the Enemy Property Act, demonstrating that this law has been abused by those in power through corruption.

=== Effect on Bangladeshi demographics ===
The law in its implementation has been seen as a factor behind the reduction of the Bangladeshi Hindu population percentage, which has declined from an estimated 30% in 1947, to 17% in 1965 to 8% today, representing a loss of around 11 million people.

== Repeal of the act ==
Finally in the run up to the 2001 election Sheikh Hasina and the Awami League succeeded in a drive to repeal the act. The Vested Properties Return Act (2001) was implemented (in a session boycotted by the opposition BNP and Jamaat members) in an effort to make amends for the confiscated property. However little progress has been made in returning or compensating lost property under the Khaleda Zia government from 2001 to 2006. In 2008, Human Rights Congress for Bangladesh Minorities (HRCBM) filed a writ before Bangladesh Supreme Court under article 102 of the constitution.
