= Ispahani Public School & College =

Educational institution of Chittagong, Bangladesh

- ইস্পাহানী পাবলিক স্কুল এন্ড কলেজ
- Motto: শিক্ষা ব্রতে এসো, সেবার তরে যাও
- Motto in English: Enter to learn, leave to serve
- Type: Private
- Established: 1979
- Founder: Mirza Ahmad Ispahani
- Chairman: Mirza Salman Ispahani
- Principal: Ahmed Shaheen Alrazee (Acting)
- Faculty: Teachers + stuff = 161
- Students: 643
- Location: Khulshi, Chittagong, Bangladesh; 22.3597°N 91.8160°E
- Campus: Urban
- Colors: Navy blue and white
- Nickname: IPSC
- Website: www.ipscctg.edu.bd

Ispahani Public School & College, Chattogram more commonly known as IPSC, is a prominent private educational institution on Zakir Hossain Road in Chittagong, Bangladesh. The institution offers primary, secondary, and higher secondary education facilities under the Chittagong Education Board. Founded by Mirza Ahmad Ispahani in 1979 and currently leading by Mirza Salman Ispahani. This institution is widely known for its excellent results in J.S.C., S.S.C., and H.S.C. exams and its discipline. Muntasirul Islam was the founding principal and rector of the Ispahani Public School (1979–1985).

== History ==
The school started in 1981 with a three storied building having students from KG-1 to class eight. By this time the school had grown with many multistoried buildings, a science laboratory, a library, and a sports room, and extended its level up to higher secondary. In 1989, the school achieved the status of a public school and started offering primary secondary and higher secondary education facilities under the Chittagong Education Board from the academic year of 1989–90. The student first appeared in S.S.C exam in 1985 and H.S.C exam in 1991. Now the institution is widely known for its excellent result in S.S.C. and H.S.C. exam and its excellent discipline.

=== School ===
From 2016, the institution decided to set class-3 as the entry level. IPSC authorities also started English version (NC).

=== College ===
Every year IPSC takes around 800 students in science, business studies and humanities.

== Notable people ==
- Ashfaque Nipun (Bangladeshi television director and screenwriter)
- Nasir Uddin Khan ( Bangladeshi actor)
- Babar Ali (mountaineer)

== See also ==
- Education in Bangladesh
- Colleges in Chittagong
