= Ispahani Islamia Eye Institute and Hospital =

Ophthalmological hospital in Dhaka, Bangladesh

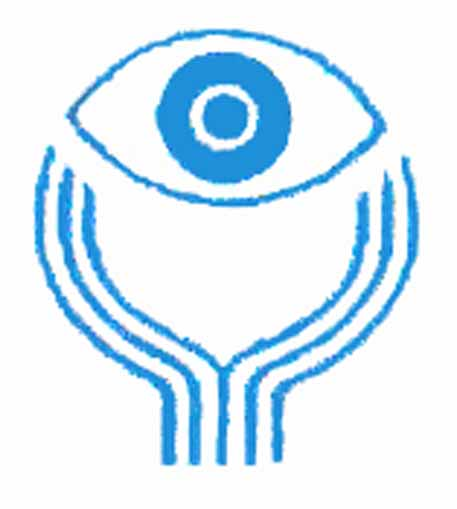

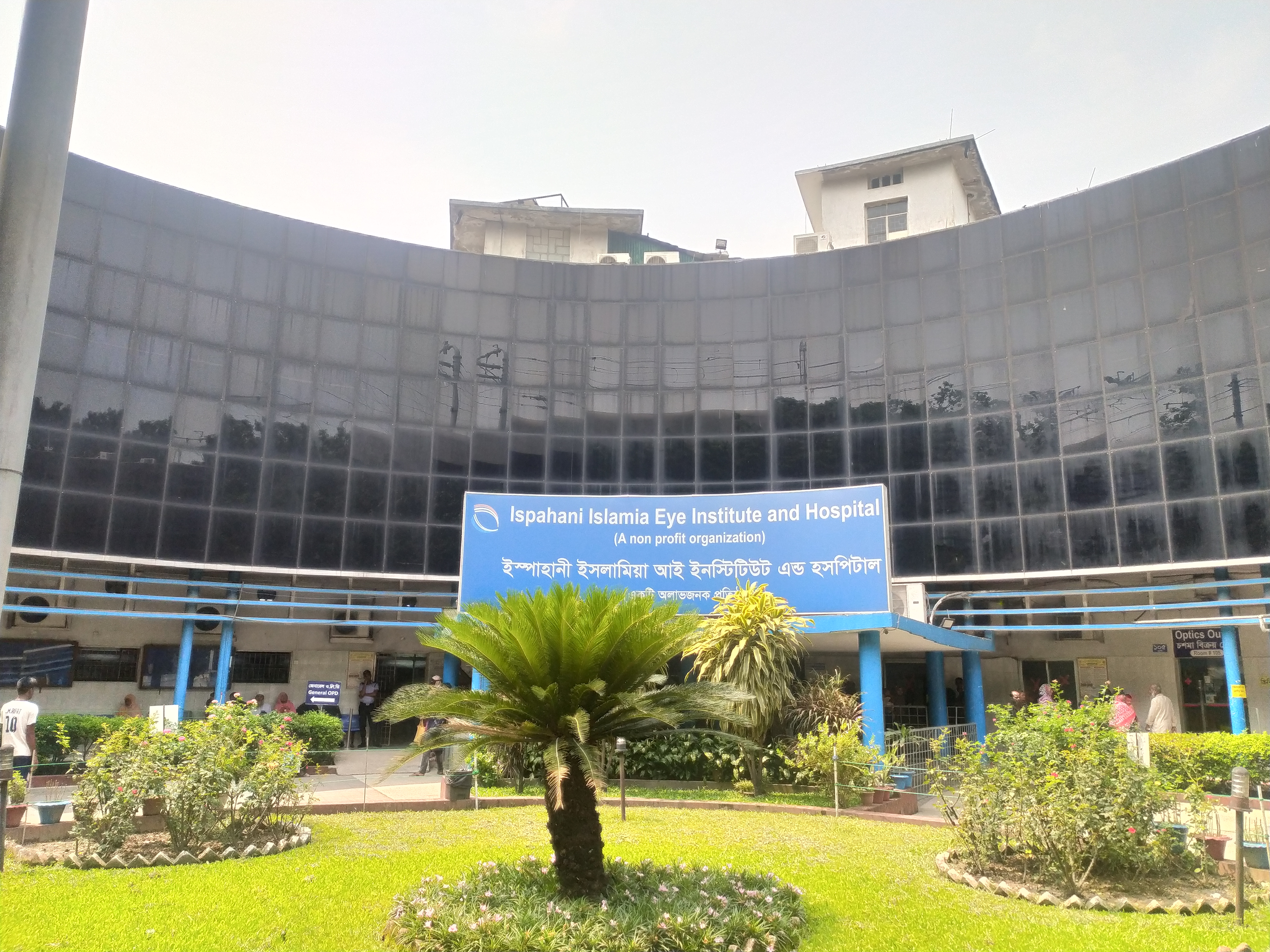

Geography
- Location: Dhaka, Bangladesh
- Coordinates: 23.7586°N 90.3850°E

Organisation
- Type: Specialist

Services
- Speciality: Ophthalmological

History
- Opened: 1960

Links
- Website: www.islamia.org.bd
- Lists: Hospitals in Bangladesh

The Ispahani Islamia Eye Institute and Hospital is an ophthalmological hospital in Dhaka, Bangladesh. The hospital was founded by Bangladeshi philanthropist Mirza Ahmad Ispahani in 1960.

In addition to tertiary care and rehabilitation for an average of 700 patients per day, the hospital offers education programs for medical staff and the wider community regarding causes and treatment for common eye disorders. It also works in collaboration with different international organisations such as Sight Savers International, Siemens AG, and ORBIS International on programs for the prevention of blindness in the Bangladeshi community.

In 2001 the hospital established Bangladesh's first amniotic membrane processing laboratory.
