= The Financial Express (Bangladesh) =

English daily published in Dhaka

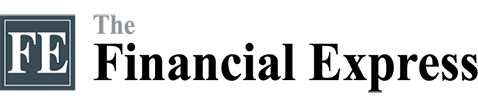
- First Financial Daily in Bangladesh
- Type: Daily and online newspaper
- Editor: Shamsul Huq Zahid
- Founded: 1993
- Language: English
- Headquarters: Tropicana Tower (4th floor), 45 Topkhana Road, GPO Box: 2526, Dhaka-1000
- Website: thefinancialexpress.com.bd

The Financial Express is an English-language daily published from Dhaka, Bangladesh, established in 1993. As of 2021, it was the second largest English language newspaper in Bangladesh. Its stories focus mostly on business and economic issues, including international economic news.

The paper is owned by International Publications Limited. Shamsul Huq Zahid is the current editor.

== History ==
The Financial Express was established in 1993 under International Publications Limited. Moazzem Hossain was the founding editor of The Financial Express. It has syndication agreement with Financial Times and Project Syndicate, based in Prague.

On 27 January 1998, Financial Express Journalists Union went on strike after filing a dispute against the management under the Industrial Relations Ordinance, 1969 over outstanding payment to staff.

The Financial Express with Standard Chartered Bank has an annual award program for best corporate social responsibility in Bangladesh.

In August 2018, AHM Moazzem Hossain, founding editor of the paper, died in Square Hospital, Dhaka.

The Financial Express news editor, Abdullah M Hasan, died on 17 July 2020 from COVID-19. In May 2021, the executive editor of The Financial Express, Shahiduzzaman Khan, died from COVID-19.

== Awards ==
In 2010, Developing Asia Journalism Awards, based in Japan, gave awards to two journalists of The Financial Express, AZM Anas and Raihan M Chowdhury, for two reports published in the newspaper.

In February 2016, Economic Reporters' Forum gave a gratitude award to Shamsul Huq Zahid, editor of The Financial Express.
