= Miss World Venezuela 2000 =

1st Miss World Venezuela pageant

- Date: July 15, 2000
- Presenters: Maite Delgado
- Entertainment: Proyecto M; Rummy Olivo; Reynaldo Armas; Tamara; Julio Iglesias
- Venue: Venevisión Studios, Caracas, Venezuela
- Broadcaster: International: Univisión; Venevisión Continental; DirecTV; Official broadcaster: Venevisión
- Entrants: 36
- Placements: 1
- Winner: Vanessa Cárdenas; Zulia

Miss World Venezuela 2000 was the 1st Miss World Venezuela pageant. It was held at the Venevisión Studios in Caracas, Venezuela on July 15, 2000.

At the end of the event, Martina Thorogood of Miranda crowned Vanessa Cárdenas of Zulia as Miss World Venezuela 2000. She represented Venezuela at the Miss World 2000 pageant.

== Background ==
In 1996, the Miss Venezuela Organization founded the Mister Venezuela competition, as an initial request of the Miss World Organization.

Since Venezuela debuted in Miss World 1955 with Susana Duijm, representatives to the British pageant were chosen within the Miss Venezuela pageant. However, In 1999, the Miss World Organization also requested that the winner of Miss Venezuela, Martina Thorogood, represented the country at Miss World. After her placement as 1st runner-up in Miss World 1999, the Miss Venezuela Organization founded Miss World Venezuela (Miss Venezuela Mundo) as an independent pageant to Miss Venezuela.

However, from time to time, representatives have been chosen within the Miss Venezuela pageant itself; the last time this occurred was in 2017 with Veruska Ljubisavljević.

== Pageant ==
=== Selection committee ===
The judges for Miss World Venezuela include:

- Martina Thorogood – Miss Venezuela 1999 and 1st runner-up in Miss World 1999
- Astrid Carolina Herrera – Miss World 1984
- Alejandro Otero – Mister Venezuela 1999 and Top 10 in Mister World 2000

== Results ==
=== Miss World Venezuela ===
- Declared as winner
- Ended as runner-up or top 5/8 qualification
- Ended as one of the finalists or semifinalists

Placement	Contestant	International Placement
Miss World Venezuela 2000	Zulia (No. 14) – Vanessa Cárdenas	Unplaced — Miss World 2000

== Contestants ==
36 contestants competed for the title.

No.	Contestant	Age (Note: Ages at the time of the pageant)	Height	Hometown	Notes
1	Isis Yumali Durán Moreno	21	172 cm (5 ft 7 1/2 in)	Ureña	Subsequently Miss Táchira 2000
2	Verónica Leal Prieto	19	173 cm (5 ft 8 in)	Maracaibo	Subsequently Miss Trujillo 2000
3	Johanna Mijares		175 cm (5 ft 9 in)		
4	Vivian Inés Urdaneta Rincón	21	175 cm (5 ft 9 in)	Maracaibo	Subsequently Miss Costa Oriental 2000
5	María Edilia Rangel		171 cm (5 ft 7 1/2 in)	Mérida	
6	Ligia Fernanda Petit Vargas	18	175 cm (5 ft 9 in)	Maracay	Subsequently Miss Guárico 2000
7	Mariangélica García López	18	170 cm (5 ft 7 in)	Valencia	Subsequently Miss Carabobo 2000
8	Felisa Elena Gómez Perdomo	22	170 cm (5 ft 7 in)	Barquisimeto	Subsequently Miss Lara 2000
9	Astrid Eyleen Carati Del Nogal	21	173 cm (5 ft 8 in)	Ciudad Guayana	Subsequently Miss Cojedes 2000
10	Anaís María Franco Millán	23	170 cm (5 ft 7 in)	Cabimas	Subsequently Miss Falcón 2000
11	Keratriz del Carmen Boyd Zamora		177 cm (5 ft 9 1/2 in)	Mérida	
12	Bianca Rosanna Urdaneta García	18	179 cm (5 ft 10 1/2 in)	Maracaibo	Subsequently Miss Mérida 2000
13	Verónica María Hernández Osborn	20	177 cm (5 ft 9 1/2 in)	Caracas	Subsequently Miss Monagas 2000
14	Vanessa María Cárdenas Bravo	19	177 cm (5 ft 9 1/2 in)	Maracaibo	
15	Victoria Eugenia López-Pando Noboa	19	177 cm (5 ft 9 1/2 in)	Puerto La Cruz	Subsequently Miss Anzoátegui 2000
16	Norbellys Andreína Caldera Arias	18	176 cm (5 ft 9 1/2 in)	Maracay	
17	Ainett Mery Stephens Sifontes	18	181 cm (5 ft 11 1/2 in)	Ciudad Guayana	Subsequently Miss Bolívar 2000
18	Leidy Gisela Moncada Guerrero	18	178 cm (5 ft 10 in)	San Cristóbal	Subsequently Miss Amazonas 2000
19	Daniela Ysabel Monzant Valencia	18	178 cm (5 ft 10 in)	Maracaibo	Subsequently Miss Península Goajira 2000
20	Gabriela Romero		175 cm (5 ft 9 in)		
21	Zonia Hassan El Hawi Musa	20	175 cm (5 ft 9 in)	Porlamar	Subsequently Miss Nueva Esparta 2000
22	Reyna Fabiola Borges Noguera	19	173 cm (5 ft 8 in)	Valencia	Subsequently Miss Sucre 2000
23	Andrea Eugenia Fargier Paoli		177 cm (5 ft 9 1/2 in)	Mérida	
24	Cecilia Villegas Arteaga	24	179 cm (5 ft 10 1/2 in)	Maracaibo	Subsequently Miss Zulia 2000
25	Susana Stephany de Fazio Bracutto	17	174 cm (5 ft 8 1/2 in)	Caracas	Subsequently Miss Miranda 2000
26	Andrea Collins		170 cm (5 ft 7 in)		
27	Inés Mujica Sheero		172 cm (5 ft 7 1/2 in)		
28	Paola Andrea Cevallos Zuluaga	20	184 cm (6 ft 1/2 in)	La Victoria	Subsequently Miss Delta Amacuro 2000
29	Ana Isabel Luján		179 cm (5 ft 10 1/2 in)		
30	Eva Mónica Anna Ekvall Johnson †	17	179 cm (5 ft 10 1/2 in)	Caracas	Subsequently Miss Apure 2000
31	Kelin Yosselin Peña	18	177 cm (5 ft 9 1/2 in)	San Cristóbal	Subsequently Miss Barinas 2000
32	Sabrina Daneri	21	178 cm (5 ft 10 in)	Caracas	Subsequently Miss Portuguesa 2000
33	Dahilmar del Valle Toledo Moreno	17	176 cm (5 ft 9 1/2 in)	Valencia	Subsequently Miss Distrito Capital 2000
34	Natascha Vanessa Börger Sevilla	19	180 cm (5 ft 11 in)	Caracas	Subsequently Miss Yaracuy 2000
35	Adriana Alcibel Steinkopf Torres	18	184 cm (6 ft 1/2 in)	Valencia	Subsequently Miss Aragua 2000
36	Josmar Alexandra Matute Gómez		175 cm (5 ft 9 in)		
	Ana Belén Abreu Toledo (Note: Ana Belén Abreu, Miss Vargas 2000, was the only contestant who did not previously participate in the inaugural edition of Miss Venezuela Mundo 2000)	18	176 cm (5 ft 9 1/2 in)	Maracay	Subsequently Miss Vargas 2000
