= Miss República Bolivariana de Venezuela =

Emergency pageant to choose Venezuela's representative to the 2000 Miss Universe

- Date: February 26, 2000
- Presenters: Maite Delgado
- Entertainment: Ballet de Venevisión; Tatiana Irizar; Veruska Ramírez; Fabiola Colmenares; Carlos Ponce
- Venue: Estudio 1, Venevisión, Caracas, Venezuela
- Broadcaster: Venevision
- Entrants: 10
- Placements: 3
- Winner: Claudia Moreno; Distrito Capital

Miss República Bolivariana de Venezuela 2000 was an emergency pageant to choose Venezuela's representative to the 2000 Miss Universe Pageant due to a requirement made by the Miss Universe Organization. Martina Thorogood, Miss Venezuela 1999 was not eligible to compete at 2000's pageant because she had already placed as first runner-up at Miss World 1999.

Ten former delegates of previous editions of Miss Venezuela took part at it. This time, they were enumerated.

At the end of the show, Claudia Moreno was crowned as Miss República Bolivariana de Venezuela 2000 and went to compete at Miss Universe 2000 in Nicosia, Cyprus, where she placed as first runner-up.
