= Miss Venezuela 2018 =

65th edition of the Miss Venezuela competition

- Date: 13 December 2018
- Presenters: Henrys Silva; Fanny Otatti; José Andres Padrón
- Entertainment: Omar Enrique
- Venue: Estudio 5 de Venevisión, Caracas, Venezuela
- Broadcaster: Venevisión; Venevision Plus; DirecTV
- Entrants: 24
- Placements: 10
- Winner: Isabella Rodríguez; Portuguesa
- Congeniality: Claudia Villavicencio (Lara)
- Photogenic: Alondra Echeverría (Yaracuy)

Miss Venezuela 2018 was the 65th edition of the Miss Venezuela held on December 13, 2018 at the Estudio 5 de Venevisión in Caracas, Venezuela. At the end of the event, Miss World Venezuela 2017, Veruska Ljubisavljević, crowned Isabella Rodríguez of Portuguesa as the winner. She represented Venezuela at Miss World 2019 and made into top 40.

This was the first edition of Miss Venezuela not being under the chairmanship of Osmel Sousa, who was president for 40 years. After his resignation, the organization is now chaired by three former Venezuelan beauty queens: Gabriela Isler, Miss Universe 2013, Jacqueline Aguilera, Miss World 1995 and Nina Sicilia, Miss International 1985. This marks the second time the winner goes to the Miss World pageant instead of Miss Universe, after Martina Thorogood, Miss Venezuela 1999, represented Venezuela at Miss World 1999.

== Results ==
=== Placements ===
Color key

- Declared as Winner
- Ended as Runner-up
- Ended as one of the Finalists or Semi-finalists

Placement	Contestant	International Placement
Miss Venezuela 2018	Portuguesa – Isabella Rodríguez	Top 40 — Miss World 2019
1st Runner-Up	Yaracuy – Alondra Echeverría	
2nd Runner-Up	Táchira – Oricia Domínguez	
Top 5	Distrito Capital – Arantxa Barazarte; Vargas – Juliette Lemoine	
Top 10	Anzoátegui – María Eloína Hurtado; Carabobo – Claudia María; Falcón – Fernanda Escobar; Guárico – Francis Armas; Zulia – María Eugenia Penoth	

== Challenge Events ==
Winners secured a place in the top ten.

Fast Track	Finalists	Winner
Talent Competition	Anzoátegui – María Eloína Hurtado; Portuguesa – Isabella Rodríguez; Táchira – Oricia Domínguez; Zulia – María Eugenia Penoth	Guárico – Francis Armas
Sports Competition	Miranda – Andreína Aguirre; Sucre – Anabella Alsamarrai	Falcón – Fernanda Escobar
Top Model	Anzoátegui – María Eloína Hurtado; Barinas – Kelly Mejías	Portuguesa – Isabella Rodríguez
Beauty With a Purpose	Portuguesa – Isabella Rodríguez; Sucre – Anabella Alsamarrai	Táchira – Oricia Domínguez

=== Interactive Beauty Gala ===
The following awards were given by fan vote on missvenezuela.com and Twitter. This year, they were given during the telecast of the pageant on December 13.

Award	Contestant
Miss Smile	Aragua – Carla Viera
Miss Catwalk Hands	Mérida – Saraí Builes
Miss Precious Gem	Anzoátegui – María Eloína Hurtado
Miss Travel and Tours	Capital District – Arantxa Barazarte
Miss Health and Aesthetics	Carabobo – Claudia María
Miss Fitness	Cojedes – Daniela Vanieri
Miss Personality	Portuguesa – Isabella Rodríguez
Miss Glamour	Amazonas – Oxlaniela Oropeza
Miss Confidence	Barinas – Kelly Mejías
Miss Magic and Fantasy	Sucre – Anabella Alsamarrai

== Contestants ==
Contestants from all 23 states and the Capital District of the country competed for the title.

State	Contestant	Age	Height (cm)	Hometown
Amazonas	Oxlaniela del Carmen Oropeza Rivero	21	1.77 m (5 ft 10 in)	Caracas
Anzoátegui	María Eloína Hurtado Hernández	20	1.72 m (5 ft 8 in)	Puerto La Cruz
Apure	María Fernanda Rodríguez Pacheco	23	1.73 m (5 ft 8 in)	Caracas
Aragua	Carla Daniela Viera González	22	1.72 m (5 ft 8 in)	Maracaibo
Barinas	Kelly Jhuset Mejías Romero	19	1.73 m (5 ft 8 in)	Charallave
Bolívar	María José Hernández García	21	1.78 m (5 ft 10 in)	Valencia
Carabobo	Claudia Isabel María Rodríguez	21<	1.76 m (5 ft 9 in)	Maracaibo
Cojedes	Daniela Alexandra Venieri Surga	22	1.73 m (5 ft 8 in)	Caracas
Delta Amacuro	Ana Karina Noguera Andrade	25	1.78 m (5 ft 10 in)	La Grita
Capital District	Arantxa Marián Barazarte Mastropietro	23	1.72 m (5 ft 8 in)	Maracay
Falcón	Fernanda Karina Escobar Rondón	24	1.72 m (5 ft 8 in)	Acarigua
Guárico	Francis Joselín Armas Martínez	22	1.71 m (5 ft 7 in)	Ciudad Bolívar
Lara	Claudia Sofía Villavicencio Carrillo	23	1.70 m (5 ft 7 in)	Caracas
Mérida	Saraí Nazaret Builes Souquett	18	1.76 m (5 ft 9 in)	Aragua de Maturín
Miranda	Andreína María Aguirre Ojeda	23	1.72 m (5 ft 8 in)	Valencia
Monagas	Anaid Valentina Fuentes Jaouhari	20	1.77 m (5 ft 10 in)	Maturín
Nueva Esparta	Beida Fernanda Fossi García	23	1.74 m (5 ft 9 in)	Ocumare del Tuy
Portuguesa	María Isabel (Isabella) Rodríguez Guzmán	25	1.78 m (5 ft 10 in)	Caracas
Sucre	Annabella Alsamarrai Noguera	20	1.71 m (5 ft 7 in)	Caracas
Táchira	Oricia del Carmen Domínguez Dos Santos	24	1.76 m (5 ft 9 in)	Carayaca
Trujillo	Karla Naylin Fermín Astudillo	21	1.80 m (5 ft 11 in)	Cumaná
Vargas	Juliette Mercedes Lemoine Vegas	20	1.73 m (5 ft 8 in)	Caracas
Yaracuy	Misyel Alondra Echeverría Istúriz	22	1.71 m (5 ft 7 in)	Los Teques
Zulia	María Eugenia Penoth Hernández	24	1.76 m (5 ft 9 in)	Porlamar
