= Miss Venezuela 2000 =

47th edition of the Miss Venezuela competition

- Date: September 8, 2000
- Presenters: Omar Germenos; Maite Delgado; Fabiola Colmenares
- Entertainment: Malena Burke; Ana Llorente; Rafael Avanzini; Viviana Gibelli; Oscar D'León; Wladimir Lozano; Daniel Somaróo
- Venue: Poliedro de Caracas, Caracas, Venezuela
- Broadcaster: Venevision
- Entrants: 26
- Placements: 10
- Winner: Eva Ekvall †; Apure
- Congeniality: Ainett Stephens (Bolívar)
- Photogenic: Eva Ekvall† (Apure)
- Miss Internet: Eva Evall† (Apure)

Miss Venezuela 2000 was the 47th Miss Venezuela pageant. It was held in Caracas, Venezuela, on September 8, 2000, after weeks of events. The winner of the pageant was Eva Ekvall, Miss Apure.

The pageant was broadcast live on Venevision from the Poliedro de Caracas in Caracas, Venezuela. At the conclusion of the final night of competition, outgoing titleholder Martina Thorogood crowned Eva Ekvall of Apure as the new Miss Venezuela.

== Results ==
=== Placements ===
Placement	Contestant
Miss Venezuela 2000	Apure – Eva Mónica Anna Ekvall †
Miss Venezuela International 2000	Costa Oriental – Vivian Inés Urdaneta
Runner-Up	Guárico – Ligia Petit
Top 10	Anzoátegui – Victoria López-Pando; Bolívar – Ainett Stephens; Cojedes – Astrid Carati; Distrito Capital – Dahilmar Toledo; Nueva Esparta – Zonia El Hawi; Península Goajira – Daniela Monzant; Zulia – Cecilia Villegas

=== Special awards ===
- Miss Photogenic (voted by press reporters) – Eva Ekvall (Miss Apure)
- Miss Internet (voted by www.missvenezuela.com viewers) – Eva Ekvall (Miss Apure)
- Miss Congeniality (voted by Miss Venezuela contestants) – Ainett Stephens (Miss Bolívar)
- Miss Figure – Verónica Hernández (Miss Monagas)
- Best Smile – Zonia El Hawi (Miss Nueva Esparta)
- Best Face – Felisa Gómez(Miss Lara)
- Best Skin – Verónica Leal (Miss Trujillo)
- Best Runway – Bianca Urdaneta (Miss Mérida)
- Miss Integral – Isis Durán (Miss Táchira)

== Contestants ==
The Miss Venezuela 2000 delegates are:

State	Contestant	Age	Height (cm)	Hometown
Amazonas	Leidy Gisela Moncada	18	178 cm (5 ft 10 in)	San Cristóbal
Anzoátegui	Victoria Eugenia López-Pando Noboa	19	177 cm (5 ft 9 1/2 in)	Puerto La Cruz
Apure	Eva Mónica Anna Ekvall Johnson †	17	179 cm (5 ft 10 1/2 in)	Caracas
Aragua	Adriana Alcibel Steinkopf Torres	18	184 cm (6 ft 1/2 in)	Valencia
Barinas	Kelin Yosselin Peña	18	177 cm (5 ft 9 1/2 in)	San Cristóbal
Bolívar	Ainett Mery Stephens Sifontes	18	181 cm (5 ft 11 1/2 in)	Ciudad Guayana
Carabobo	Mariangélica García López	18	170 cm (5 ft 7 in)	Valencia
Cojedes	Astrid Eyleen Carati Del Nogal	21	173 cm (5 ft 8 in)	Ciudad Guayana
Costa Oriental	Vivian Inés Urdaneta Rincón	21	175 cm (5 ft 9 in)	Maracaibo
Delta Amacuro	Paola Andrea Cevallos Zuluaga	20	184 cm (6 ft 1/2 in)	La Victoria
Distrito Capital	Dahilmar del Valle Toledo Moreno	17	176 cm (5 ft 9 1/2 in)	Valencia
Falcón	Anaís María Franco Millán	23	170 cm (5 ft 7 in)	Cabimas
Guárico	Ligia Fernanda Petit Vargas	18	175 cm (5 ft 9 in)	Maracay
Lara	Felisa Elena Gómez Perdomo	22	170 cm (5 ft 7 in)	Barquisimeto
Mérida	Bianca Rosanna Urdaneta García	18	179 cm (5 ft 10 1/2 in)	Maracaibo
Miranda	Susana Stephany de Fazio Bracutto	17	174 cm (5 ft 8 1/2 in)	Caracas
Monagas	Verónica María Hernández Osborn	20	177 cm (5 ft 9 1/2 in)	Caracas
Nueva Esparta	Zonia Hassan El Hawi Musa	20	175 cm (5 ft 9 in)	Porlamar
Península Goajira	Daniela Ysabel Monzant Valencia	18	178 cm (5 ft 10 in)	Maracaibo
Portuguesa	Sabrina Daneri	21	178 cm (5 ft 10 in)	Caracas
Sucre	Reyna Fabiola Borges Noguera	19	173 cm (5 ft 8 in)	Valencia
Táchira	Isis Yumali Durán Moreno	21	172 cm (5 ft 7 1/2 in)	Ureña
Trujillo	Verónica Leal Prieto	19	173 cm (5 ft 8 in)	Maracaibo
Vargas	Ana Belén Abreu Toledo	18	176 cm (5 ft 9 1/2 in)	Maracay
Yaracuy	Natascha Vanessa Börger Sevilla	19	180 cm (5 ft 11 in)	Caracas
Zulia	Cecilia Villegas Arteaga	24	179 cm (5 ft 10 1/2 in)	Maracaibo

Notes

- Eva Ekvall placed as 3rd runner-up in Miss Universe 2001 in Bayamón, Puerto Rico. She died on December 17, 2011, victim of breast cancer.
- Vivian Urdaneta won Miss International 2000 in Tokyo, Japan.
- Ligia Petit won Reina Sudamericana 2000 in Santa Cruz, Bolivia, and later won Miss Intercontinental 2001 in Coburg, Germany. She also placed as 1st runner up in Miss Atlántico Internacional 2001 in Punta del Este, Uruguay.
- Mariangélica García placed as semifinalist in Miss Tourism World 2002 in Antalya, Turkey.
- Natascha Borger won Miss Germany 2002 and placed as semifinalist in Miss Universe 2002 in San Juan, Puerto Rico. She also placed as semifinalist in Miss International 2004 in Beijing, China (she represented Germany). She also was 1st. runner-up in Miss Europe 2002.
- Fabiola Borges previously placed as 2nd runner up in Miss Intercontinental 2000 in Kaiserslautern, Germany.
