= Mookhey =

Mookhey is a surname. Notable people with the surname include:

- Daniel Mookhey (born 1982), Australian politician
- Yukta Mookhey, Indian civic activist, former model and actress
