= Mulund =

- suburb
- Location within Mumbai
- Coordinates: 19.17168°N 72.95600°E
- Country: India
- State: Maharashtra
- District: Mumbai Suburban
- City (Ward): Mumbai (T)
- Taluka/Tehsil: Kurla

Government
  - Type: Municipal Corporation
  - Body: Brihanmumbai Municipal Corporation(BMC)
  - Member of Legislative Assembly: Mihir Kotecha, BJP(since 2019)
  - Member of Parliament: Sanjay Dina Patil
- Elevation: 11 m (36 ft)

Languages
  - Official: Marathi
- Time zone: UTC+5:30 (IST)
- PIN: 400080(Mulund West), 400081(Mulund East) & 400082(Mulund Colony)
- Area code: 022
- Vehicle registration: MH-03-XX-XXXX
- Lower House constituency: Mumbai North East(28)
- Legislative Assembly constituency: Mulund (155)
- Website: mumbaisuburban.gov.in

Mulund (Pronunciation: [muluɳɖ]) is a suburb in northeast Mumbai, Maharashtra, India. Mulund railway station is on the Central Railway line of the Mumbai Suburban Railway. Mulund lies southwest of Sanjay Gandhi National Park with easy access to the Eastern Express Highway and Navi Mumbai through the Mulund-Airoli Bridge. Mulund marks the end of Mumbai city.

== History ==
Mulund's history is said to date back to the time of the Mauryan Empire. Referred to at that time as Muchalind, its name changed to Mul-Kund which then modified to its present name. At one point in time, the name Manglapuri was also associated with it. It is said to be the earliest planned neighborhood of Mumbai city. In 1922, a zamindar, Jhaverbhai, who owned Jhaverbhai Narottamdas & Company, gave architects Crown & Carter the permission to design Mulund. Crown and Carter used a gridiron plan - one where streets are at right angles to each other - which extends from present day Mulund railway station to Panch Rasta road Junction in Mulund (West).

== Demographics ==
Mulund has a total population of 330,195 and a population density of 7,270/km^{2} (18,800/sq mi). It is a part of Mumbai's T-ward. Mulund has around 73,540 households.

== Economy ==
Besides being an industrial hub, Mulund is also a real estate market, with commercial and residential real estate increasingly in demand.

== Educational institutions ==
=== Colleges ===
- V. G. Vaze College of Arts, Science and Commerce
- Mulund College of Commerce

=== Schools ===
- St. Pius X High School
- St. Mary's Convent School
- Sampson English High School
- Friends' Academy
- St Gregorios Public School
- Mulund Vidya Mandir
- Vani Vidyalaya
- Wamanrao Muranjan High School
- Sheth Karamshi Kanji English School
- Sri Sri Ravishankar Vidya Mandir
- DAV International School
- NES International School Mumbai

== Entertainment ==
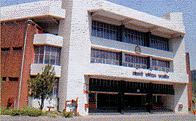
Kalidas Hall, Mulund

Mulund has a wide array of entertainment spots. From theatres (Kalidas Hall) to parks (Johnson & Johnson park and Lala Tulshiram Garden (opp.Bus Depot) to shopping malls (R-mall and Nirmal Lifestyle) and a variety of cafés and restaurants.

=== Theatres and Culture ===
Mulund's Mahakavi Kalidas Natyamandir (named after classical Sanskrit Poet Kalidasa) is Mumbai's second largest theatre auditorium. In its main hall, it can seat up to 1540 guests. Established in 1988, Kalidas Hall is one of the oldest theatres in Mumbai, yet it still remains very popular among Mulund residents. Despite its putting up a huge array of shows - from plays to dances and classical music concerts- the hall is maintained in good condition. Several cinema halls such as R Mall based multiplex, PVR Mulund & NY cinemas (old JaiGanesh cinema) a cozy multi screen new cinema hall in Mulund East cater to cosmopolitan population.

=== Parks and Greenery ===
Mulund has a total of 8 parks and gardens, thus there is always one near any locality in the suburb. The most popular of the parks are Chintamani Dwarkanath Deshmukh Gardens and Johnson & Johnson Park. The Yogi Hills connect Mulund to Borivali National Park, and are explored by many people year round.

=== Shopping ===
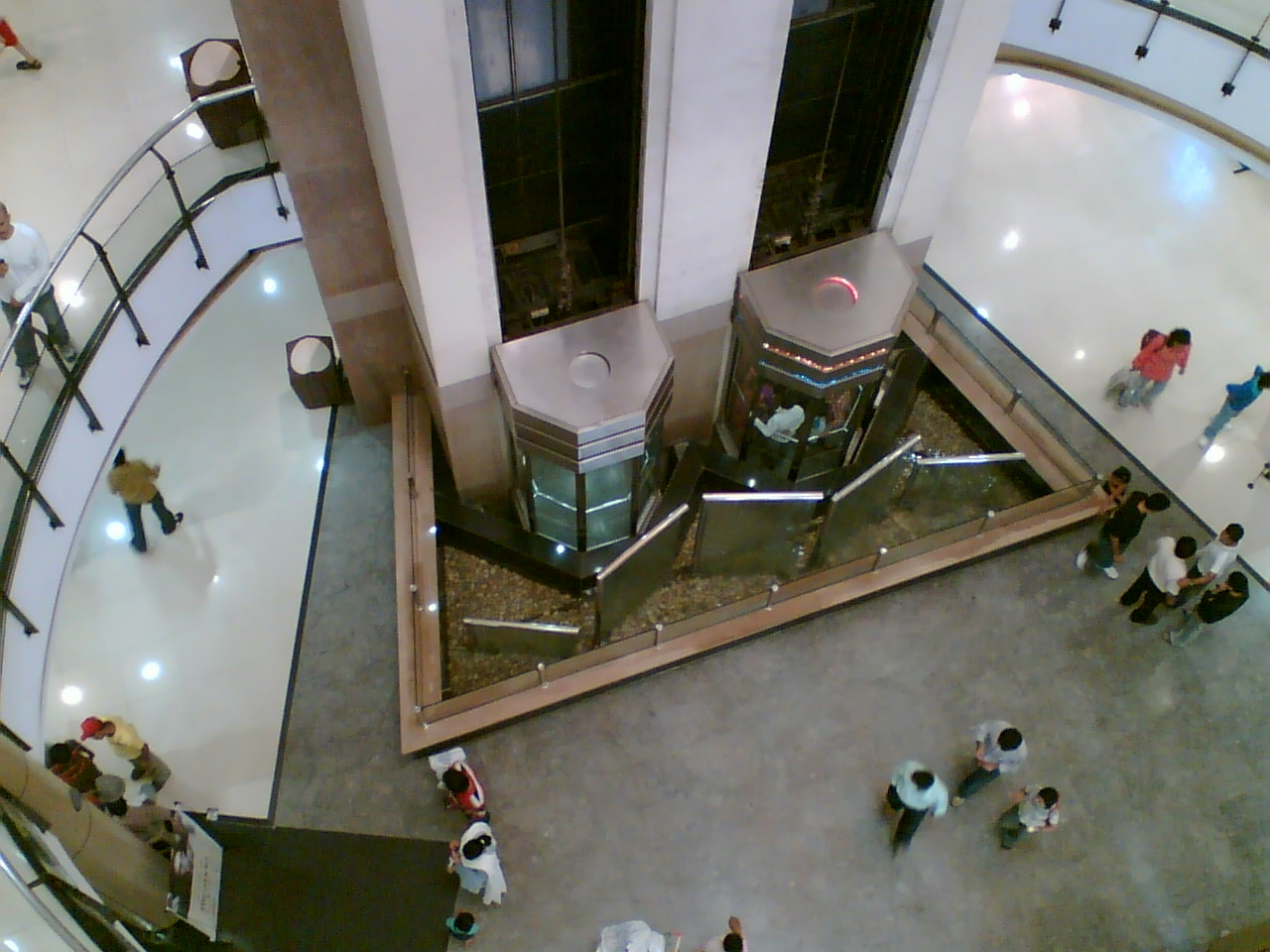
R-mall Mulund

Mulund promotes recreational shopping through its malls and wholesales stores, which include both domestic and foreign businesses. R-Mall is one such mall and also the most frequented in Mulund.

== Notable residents ==
- Avika Gor, Indian Actress
- Yukta Mookhey, Miss World 1999
- Ashwiny Iyer Tiwari, Indian filmmaker and writer
- Ajinkya Rahane, Indian International Cricketer
- Ashok Kumar (Tamil actor), Indian actor

== Transportation ==
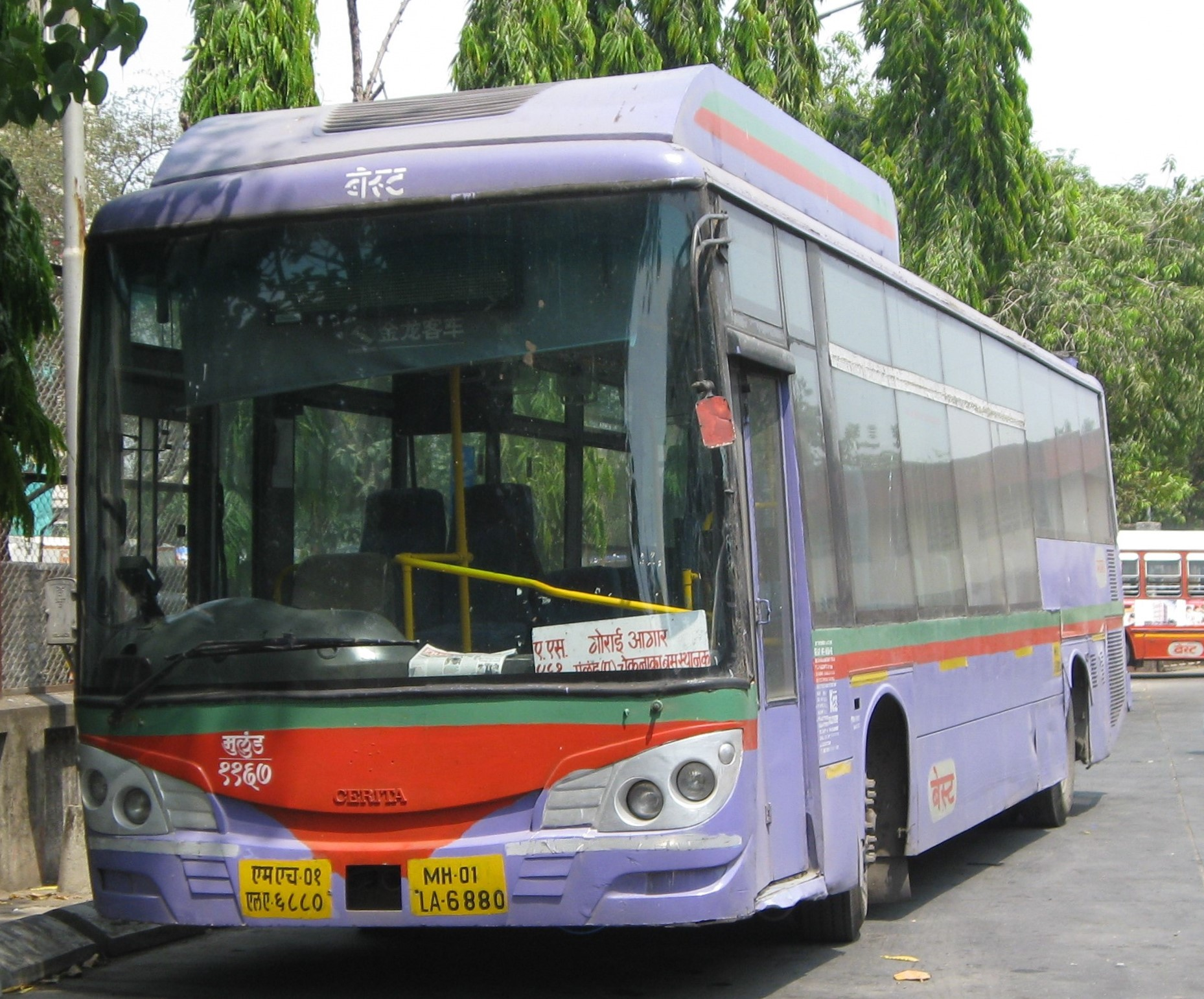
A BEST AC Bus at the Mulund Check Naka bus station

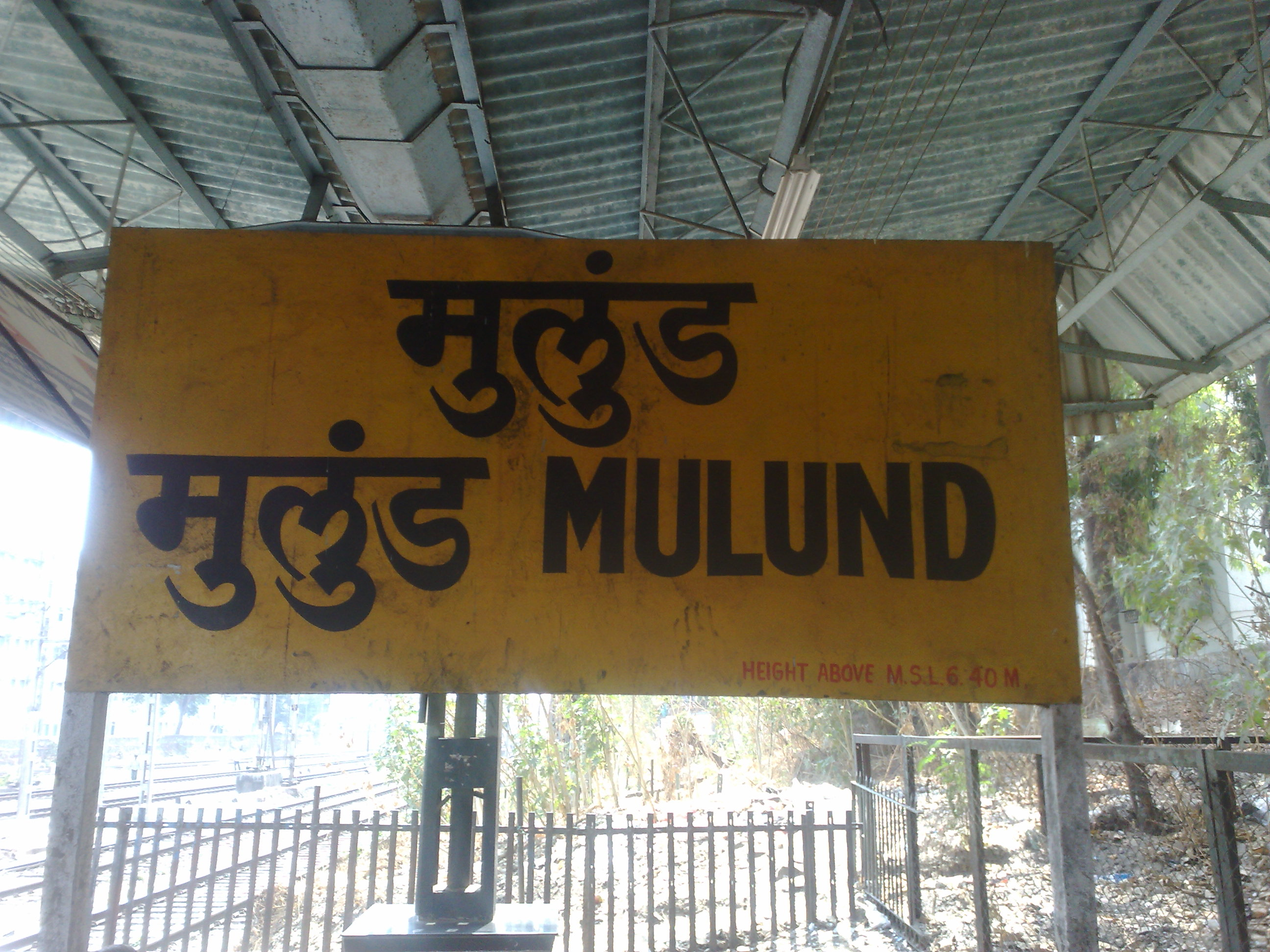
Mulund Railway Station

Mulund Station falls on the central line of Mumbai railway. It is a stop for slow local trains as well as semi-fast local trains on the central line of the Mumbai suburban network. The Mulund railway station said to be a clean station. It won a Cleanliness Award, out of the total 42 stations on the Central Railway Line. Under construction, Mumbai Metro Line 4 (WADALA - KASARVADAVALI), will be passing through Mulund's L.B.S. Road.

== See also ==
- Gateway Towers Mumbai
