= Vaze =

Vaze is a surname occurring in India. Notable people with the surname include:

- Madhav Vaze (1939–2025), Indian actor
- Ramkrishnabuwa Vaze (1871–1945), Indian Hindustani Classical musician
- Sachin Vaze (born 1972), Indian former police officer

== See also ==
- V. G. Vaze College of Arts, Science and Commerce, a Mumbai University affiliated college
- Mirza Shafi Vazeh (died 1852), Azerbaijani poet and teacher
