= Claudia Moreno =

Venezuelan beauty pageant titleholder

- Born: Caracas, Venezuela
- Height: 1.78 m (5 ft 10 in)
- Beauty pageant titleholder
- Title: Miss República Bolivariana de Venezuela 2000
- Hair color: Brunette
- Eye color: Hazel
- Major competitions: Miss Venezuela 1999; (Top 10); Miss Republica Bolivariana Venezuela 2000; (Winner); Miss Universe 2000; (1st Runner-Up)

Claudia Moreno (Spanish pronunciation: [ˈklawðja moˈɾeno]) is a Venezuelan beauty pageant titleholder who represented Venezuela at Miss Universe 2000, and was first runner-up.

== Pageant participation ==
=== Miss Venezuela 1999 ===
Moreno competed in Miss Venezuela 1999, representing the Venezuelan Capital District, where she finished in the top 10.

=== Miss Republica Bolivariana Venezuela 2000 ===
When the winner of Miss Venezuela 1999, Martina Thorogood, was denied for Miss Universe 2000, the Miss Venezuela Organization decided to have a second, smaller pageant to send a delegate to Miss Universe, consisting of delegates who had competed in previous Miss Venezuela competitions, called Miss Republica Bolivariana Venezuela 2000. Moreno competed and was chosen to represent Venezuela at Miss Universe.

=== Miss Universe 2000 ===
Moreno competed at Miss Universe 2000, held in Nicosia, Cyprus on May 12, 2000, and finished as first runner-up to Lara Dutta of India.

Awards and achievements
Preceded by (Philippines) Miriam Quiambao	Miss Universe 1st Runner-Up; 2000	Succeeded by (Greece) Evelina Papantoniou
Preceded by Delta Amacuro, Carolina Indriago	Venezuelan delegate to Miss Universe; 2000	Succeeded by Apure, Eva Ekvall
Preceded by Inaugural Holder	Miss República Bolivariana de Venezuela; 2000	Succeeded by None
