= Memsaab =

Memsaab or Memsahib may refer to:

- Memsaab or Memsahib, a female variation of the term of address Sahib
- Memsaab (film), a 1971 Bollywood drama
- Memsahab, a 2008 Hindi-language film
