= Gateway Towers Mumbai =

- Interactive map of the Gateway Towers Mumbai area

General information
- Status: Under construction
- Type: Residential
- Location: Mulund, Mumbai, India
- Construction started: 2014
- Estimated completion: 2018
- Owner: Tata Housing Development Company

Height
- Height: 159 meters

Technical details
- Floor count: 31 to 41
- Lifts/elevators: 4 to 6

Design and construction
- Architect: Callison
- Developer: Tata Housing Development Company

Gateway Towers is a residential complex under construction in Mumbai, India. It will have 6 residential towers ranging from 31 to 41 stories.

Gateway Towers has been designed by Callison. It is located in the northeastern suburb of Mulund. The property is built on an 8.5-acre area.
