= Miss Venezuela 1999 =

46th edition of the Miss Venezuela competition

- Date: September 10, 1999
- Presenters: José Luis Rodríguez; Maite Delgado
- Entertainment: Simón Díaz; José Luis Rodríguez; Jess
- Venue: Poliedro de Caracas, Caracas, Venezuela
- Broadcaster: Venevision
- Entrants: 26
- Placements: 10
- Winner: Martina Thorogood; Miranda
- Congeniality: Adriana Maurera; Anzoátegui
- Photogenic: Norkys Batista; Nueva Esparta

Miss Venezuela 1999 was the 46th Miss Venezuela pageant, was held in Caracas, Venezuela on September 10, 1999 after weeks of events. The winner of the pageant was Martina Thorogood, Miss Miranda.

The pageant was broadcast live on Venevision from the Poliedro de Caracas in Caracas, Venezuela. At the conclusion of the final night of competition, outgoing titleholder Carolina Indriago, crowned Martina Thorogood of Miranda as the new Miss Venezuela.

== Results ==
=== Placements ===
Placement	Contestant
Miss Venezuela 1999	Miranda – Martina Thorogood
1st Runner-Up	Nueva Esparta –Norkys Batista
2nd Runner-Up	Vargas – Andreina Llamozas
Top 10	Apure – Maria Luisa Flores; Carabobo – Antonella Baricelli; Cojedes – Rocío Alvarez; Costa Oriental – Maria Laura Lugo; Delta Amacuro – Eva Priscila Soler; Distrito Capital – Claudia Moreno; Monagas – Mayerling Moreno

=== Special awards ===
- Miss Internet (voted by www.missvenezuela.com viewers) - Martina Thorogood (Miranda)
- Miss Figure - Claudia Moreno (Distrito Federal)
- Best Smile - Norkys Batista (Nueva Esparta)
- Miss Elegance - Rocío Alvarez (Cojedes)
- Best Skin - Maria Luisa Flores (Apure)
- Best Legs - Andreína Llamozas (Vargas)
- Miss Integral - Martina Thorogood (Miranda)
- Best Hair - Antonella Baricelli (Carabobo)

== Contestants ==
The Miss Venezuela 1999 delegates are:

State	Contestant	Age	Height (cm)	Hometown
Amazonas	Jenny Johanna Negrón Lozada	21	176 cm (5 ft 9 1/2 in)	Caracas
Anzoátegui	Adriana Ramilet Maurera Boyer	24	177 cm (5 ft 9 1/2 in)	Puerto La Cruz
Apure	Maria Luisa Flores García	19	173 cm (5 ft 8 in)	Caracas
Aragua	Lenny Zulay Utria	22	177 cm (5 ft 9 1/2 in)	Maracay
Barinas	Betzabeth Rosalyn Zárraga Escalona	21	180 cm (5 ft 11 in)	Barquisimeto
Bolívar	Mairlyn Trinidad Pereira García	19	175 cm (5 ft 9 in)	Valencia
Carabobo	Antonella Coromoto Baricelli Hidalgo	18	170 cm (5 ft 7 in)	Valencia
Cojedes	Rocío Alvarez Márquez	18	172 cm (5 ft 7 1/2 in)	Caracas
Costa Oriental	María Laura Lugo Soto	18	176 cm (5 ft 9 1/2 in)	Maracaibo
Delta Amacuro	Eva Priscila Soler Ruiz	18	181 cm (5 ft 11 1/2 in)	Maracay
Dependencias Federales	Marjorie Lissette de Sousa Rivas	19	172 cm (5 ft 7 1/2 in)	Caracas
Distrito Capital	Claudia Cristina Moreno González	21	178 cm (5 ft 10 in)	Caracas
Falcón	Ilse Johanna Pappe Salas	25	173 cm (5 ft 8 in)	Caracas
Guárico	María Fernanda León Pinto	18	176 cm (5 ft 9 1/2 in)	Valencia
Lara	Deyrim Alejandra Rivas Grimontt	19	179 cm (5 ft 10 1/2 in)	Barquisimeto
Mérida	Beatriz Elena Picott Medina	20	176 cm (5 ft 9 1/2 in)	Caracas
Miranda	Martina Thorogood Heemsen	24	176 cm (5 ft 9 1/2 in)	Valencia
Monagas	Mayerling del Valle Moreno Palomo	18	176 cm (5 ft 9 1/2 in)	Maturín
Nueva Esparta	Norkys Yelitza Batista Villaroel	22	174 cm (5 ft 8 1/2 in)	Caracas
Portuguesa	Maria Eugenia Fagúndez Mier y Terán	21	178 cm (5 ft 10 in)	Barquisimeto
Sucre	Siudy Janneth Mijares Nieto	19	180 cm (5 ft 11 in)	Caracas
Táchira	Carol Ann Useche Page	18	172 cm (5 ft 7 1/2 in)	San Cristóbal
Trujillo	Madeleine Cecilia Sánchez Ríos	22	182 cm (5 ft 11 1/2 in)	Caracas
Vargas	Andreina Mercedes Llamozas González	19	176 cm (5 ft 9 1/2 in)	Caraballeda
Yaracuy	Fanny Trinidad Moraga Riera	19	182 cm (5 ft 11 1/2 in)	Barquisimeto
Zulia	Yelitza del Pilar Vásquez Moreno	21	174 cm (5 ft 8 1/2 in)	Maracaibo

Notes

- Martina Thorogood placed as 1st runner-up in Miss World 1999 in London, United Kingdom.
- Claudia Moreno placed as 1st runner up in Miss Universe 2000 in Nicosia, Cyprus.
- Both Martina Thorogood & Claudia Moreno where runners-up to Indian delegates. Yukta Mookhey who happened to win Miss World 1999 & Lara Dutta won Miss Universe 2000
- Andreína Llamozas placed as semifinalist in Miss International 1999 in Tokyo, Japan.
- Norkys Batista won Miss Atlántico Internacional 2000 in Punta del Este, Uruguay. She also placed as semifinalist in Reinado Internacional del Café 2000 in Manizales, Colombia.
- María Laura Lugo placed as 2nd runner up in Reina Sudamericana 1999 in Santa Cruz, Bolivia.
- María Fernanda León placed as finalist in Miss Teen International 2001 in Willemstad, Curaçao.
- For the first time since 1958, the official Miss Venezuela competed at Miss World. Martina Thorogood was named 1st runner-up. Due to her runner-up status, Thorogood had a contract with the Miss World organization, therefore she could not compete in Miss Universe 2000, as previously planned. Organizers staged a small pageant called "Miss Republica Bolivariana de Venezuela" to select a delegate to Miss Universe.
- Claudia Moreno (Distrito Federal) and Maria Laura Lugo (Costa Oriental) competed in Miss Republica Bolivariana de Venezuela. Moreno won the crown, while Lugo was the 1st runner-up.
- Both Norkys Batista (Nueva Esparta) and Marjorie de Sousa (Dependencias Federales) became very successful actresses.
- Maria Fernanda Leon (Guarico) competed again in 2002 as Miss Portuguesa.
