= Brigitta Callens =

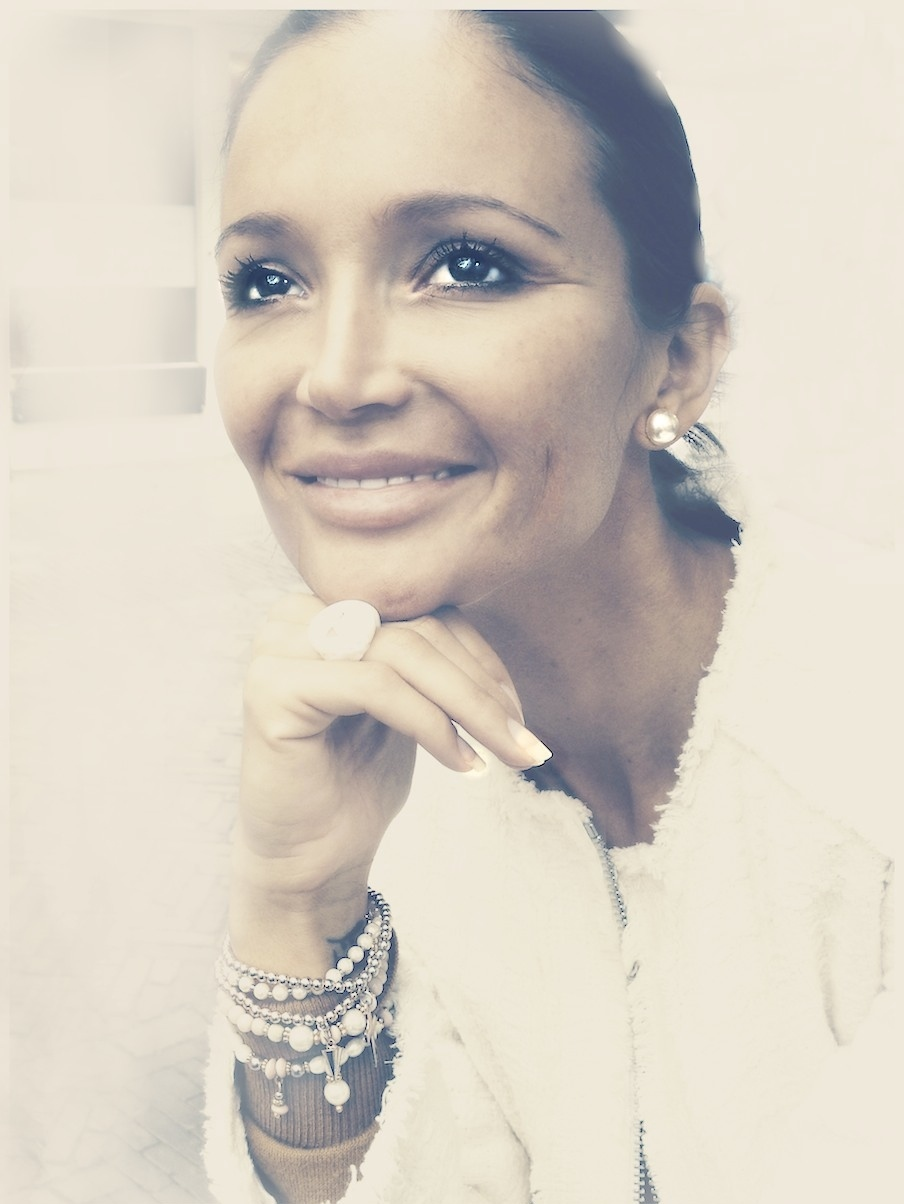
- Born: 28 September 1980 (age 45); Oudenaarde, East Flanders, Belgium

Brigitta Callens (born 28 September 1980 in Oudenaarde, East Flanders, Belgium) is a Belgian therapist, instructor and beauty pageant titleholder who was crowned Miss Belgium 1999 and her country's representative to Miss World 1999.

Brigitta "Gitta" Callens was born in Oudenaarde, a small town in the Flemish Ardennes. She was a ballerina for 8 years when she was a young girl.

She spent her childhood in Oudenaarde and moved to Ghent, during her teens to study languages.

After she won the Miss Belgium contest in 1999 at the age of 18, she became a successful international model and signed a contract with Stafford Miller to lend her face for the Sensodyne International campaign. She worked long time as a model and make-up artist in the fashion city Antwerp and created her own line of jewelry, named AKINA, which is the Japanese name for the first spring flower. Later on, she started photography.view site

She practices Raja Yoga and studied in India (Ashram of Sri Aurobindo & Auroville), Thailand, Indonesia, New York, Paris and London. She was a student at the European Academy for Natural Healthcare, and trains Raja Yoga & Vedanta in her home country. She also is therapist and instructor of the ancient holistic massage-, relaxation- and yoga nidra-therapies.

She runs her own Yoga & Mindstyle Institute "La Maison Pure" and works for Life Tv, a Belgian TV channel about Health and the Quality of Life, where she has a program about Yoga.

Preceded by Tanja Dexters	Miss Belgium; 1999	Succeeded by Joke Van De Velde
