= Miss Perú 2000 =

- Date: April 15, 2000
- Presenters: Rubén García & Karina Rivera
- Venue: Teatro Peruano Japonés, Lima
- Broadcaster: Frecuencia Latina
- Entrants: 24
- Placements: 12
- Winner: Verónica Rueckner; Piura

The Miss Perú 2000 pageant was held on April 15, 2000. That year, 24 candidates were competing for the national crown. The chosen winners represented Peru at the Miss Universe 2000 and Miss World 2000. The rest of the finalists would enter in different pageants.

Verónica Rueckner was born in Talara, Piura on August 25, 1980.

== Placements ==
Final Results	Contestant
Miss Peru Universe 2000	Piura - Verónica Rueckner
Miss World Perú 2000	Trujillo - Tatiana Angulo
Miss International Peru 2000	Tumbes - Claudia Neyra
Miss Peru Asia-Pacific 2000	Ica - Natalia Delgado
1st Runner-Up	La Libertad - María Inés Cerdena
2nd Runner-Up	Moquegua - Lucía de Olazabal
Top 12	Puno - Luciana Farfán; San Martín - Laura Huarcayo; Lambayeque - Karla Casós; Ancash - Thalía Ibañez; Huánuco - Sandra Urbina; Amazonas - Katherine Mayer

== Special awards ==
- Best Regional Costume - Moquegua - Lucia de Olazabal
- Miss Photogenic - Tumbes - Claudia Neyra
- Miss Elegance - Moquegua - Lucía de Olazabal
- Miss Body - Ancash - Thalía Ibanez
- Best Hair - Lambayeque - Karla Casós
- Miss Congeniality - Cajamarca - Carla Crovetti
- Most Beautiful Face - La Libertad - Maria Inés Cerdena
- Miss Popularity - Tumbes - Claudia Neyra (by votes of readers of GENTE Magazine)

== Delegates ==
- Amazonas - Katherine Mayer
- Ancash - Thalía Ibañez
- Apurímac - Arlette Pomacaja
- Arequipa - Patricia Velarde
- Cajamarca - Carla Crovetti
- Cuzco - Alessandra Morales Molinari
- Distrito Capital - Verónica Maseda
- Huancavelica - Analí Calderón
- Huánuco - Sandra Urbina
- Ica - Natalia Delgado
- Junín - María Alicia Acosta
- La Libertad - María Inés Cerdena
- Lambayeque - Karla Casós
- Loreto - Paola León-Prado
- Madre de Dios - Kelly Zapata
- Moquegua - Lucía de Olazabal
- Pasco - Antuanette Reaño
- Piura - Verónica Rueckner
- Puno - Luciana Farfán
- San Martín - Laura Huarcayo
- Tacna - July Lopez
- Trujillo - Tatiana Angulo
- Tumbes - Claudia Neyra
- Ucayali - Ingrid Puente

== Judges ==
- Yukta Mookhey - Miss World 1999 (from India)
- Alberto Andrade - Mayor of Lima
- Acirema Alayeto - President of the Miss Latin America Org.
- Christian Meier - Peruvian Actor & Singer
- Julio Otiniano - Representative of EGO's Spa & Beauty salon
- Luis López Hartinger - Peruvian Olympian Swimmer
- Gisela Valcárcel - Peruvian TV presenter
- Jorge Henderson - Peruvian Journalist & TV presenter
- Jean Pierre Vismara - Mister Peru 1998
- Lucila Boggiano de Zoeger - Mrs. World 1989 (from Peru)
- Luis Uzcategui - Fashion Designer

== Background Music ==
- Opening Show – Miss Peru Anthem (composed by Coco Tafur)
- Swimsuit Competition – Brainbug - "Nightmare"
- Evening Gown Competition – Vangelis - "Conquest Of Paradise"

== Special Guests Singers ==
- Jorge Pardo - "Al Final De Una Historia" & "Sin Ti"
- Ruth Karina - "Lloras Por Mi" & "Muevete"
- Rene & Renny - "Deshojo la Margarita"
