= Mulund railway station =

Railway Station in Maharashtra, India

Mulund
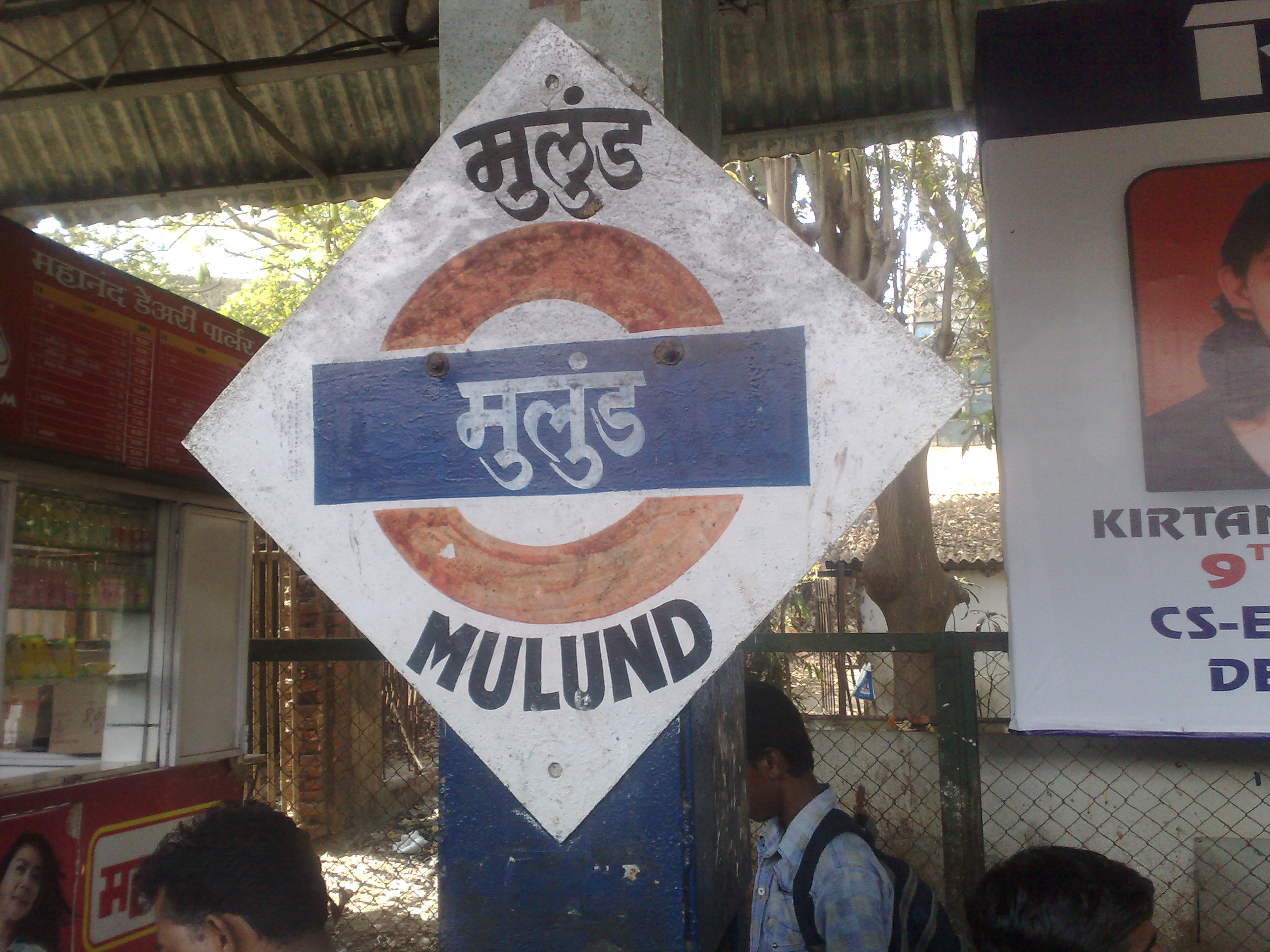

General information
- Coordinates: 19.17°N 72.952°E
- Elevation: 6.40 metres (21.0 ft)
- System: Indian Railways and Mumbai Suburban Railway station
- Owner: Ministry of Railways, Indian Railways
- Line: Central Line
- Platforms: 4
- Tracks: 6

Construction
- Structure type: Standard on-ground station
- Parking: No
- Cycle facilities: No

Other information
- Status: Active
- Station code: MLND
- Fare zone: Central Railway zone

History
- Opened: 1931

Passengers
- 2012-13: 2,55,711

Services
Preceding station	Mumbai Suburban Railway	Following station
Nahur towards Chhatrapati Shivaji Terminus	Central line	Thane towards Kasara or Khopoli
Route map
Location
- Location within Mumbai

Mulund (station code: MLND) is a railway station on the Central Line of the Mumbai Suburban Railway network.

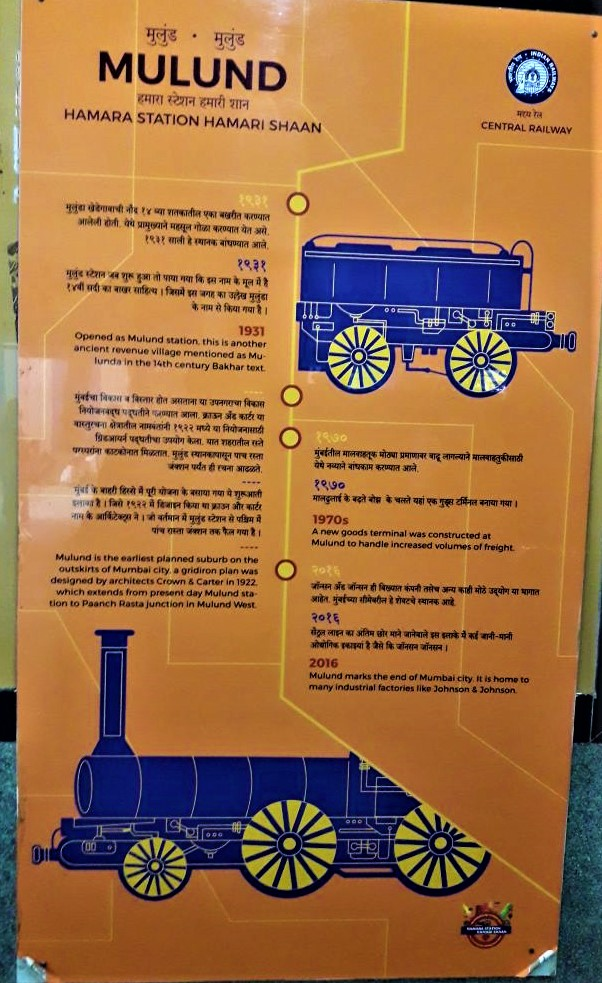
Mulund station Banner

Mulund railway station is connected via the Central Railway to South Bombay and remote places like Khopoli and Kasara.

== History ==
Mulund station was built to serve the suburb of Mulund, which was laid out in the 1920s. In the 1970s a new goods terminal was constructed at Mulund to handle increased volumes of freight. On 13 March 2003 a bomb exploded on a train pulling into Mulund station at 19:45 hrs. 10 people were killed and 70 injured.

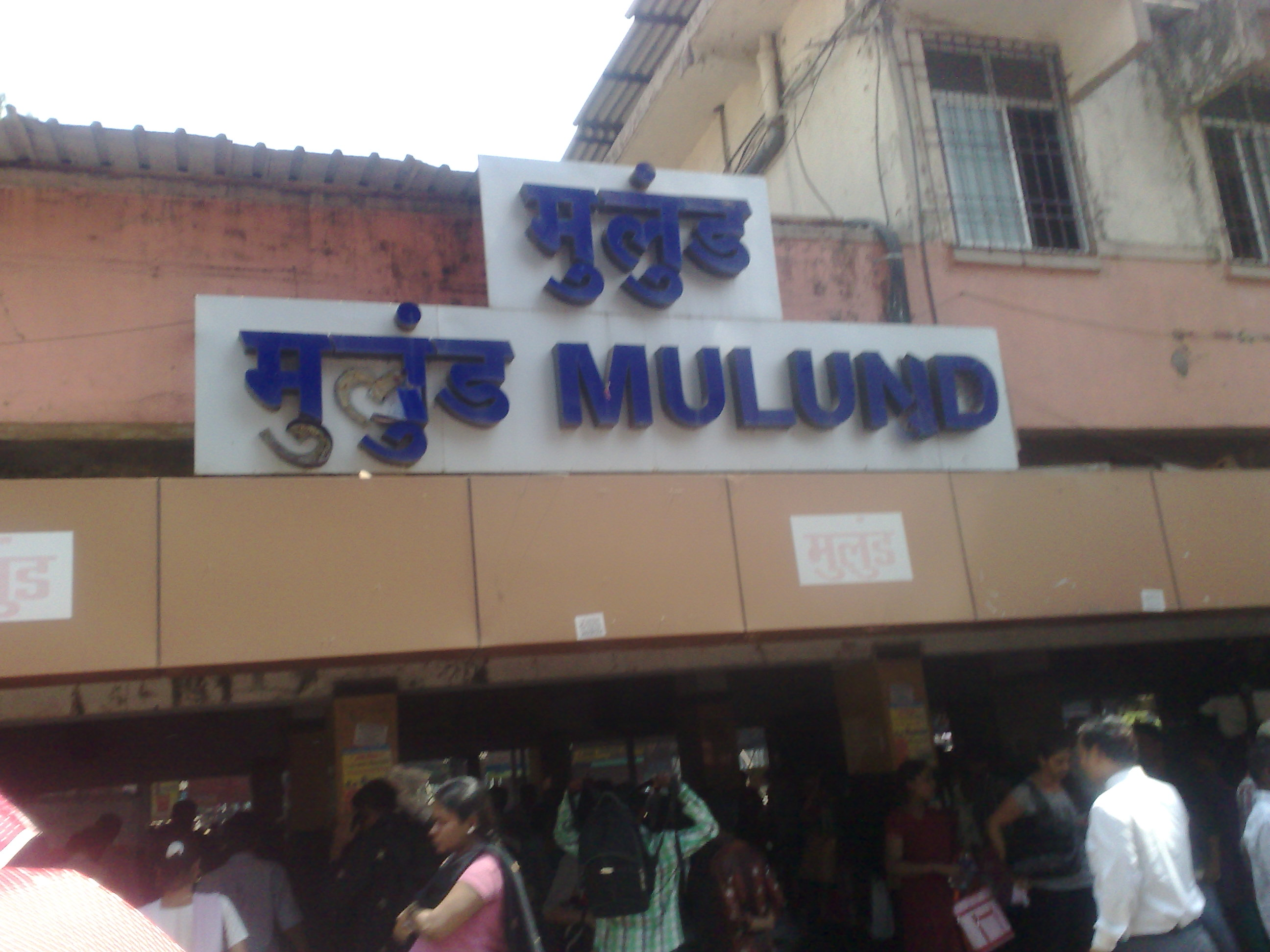
Main entrance of the station

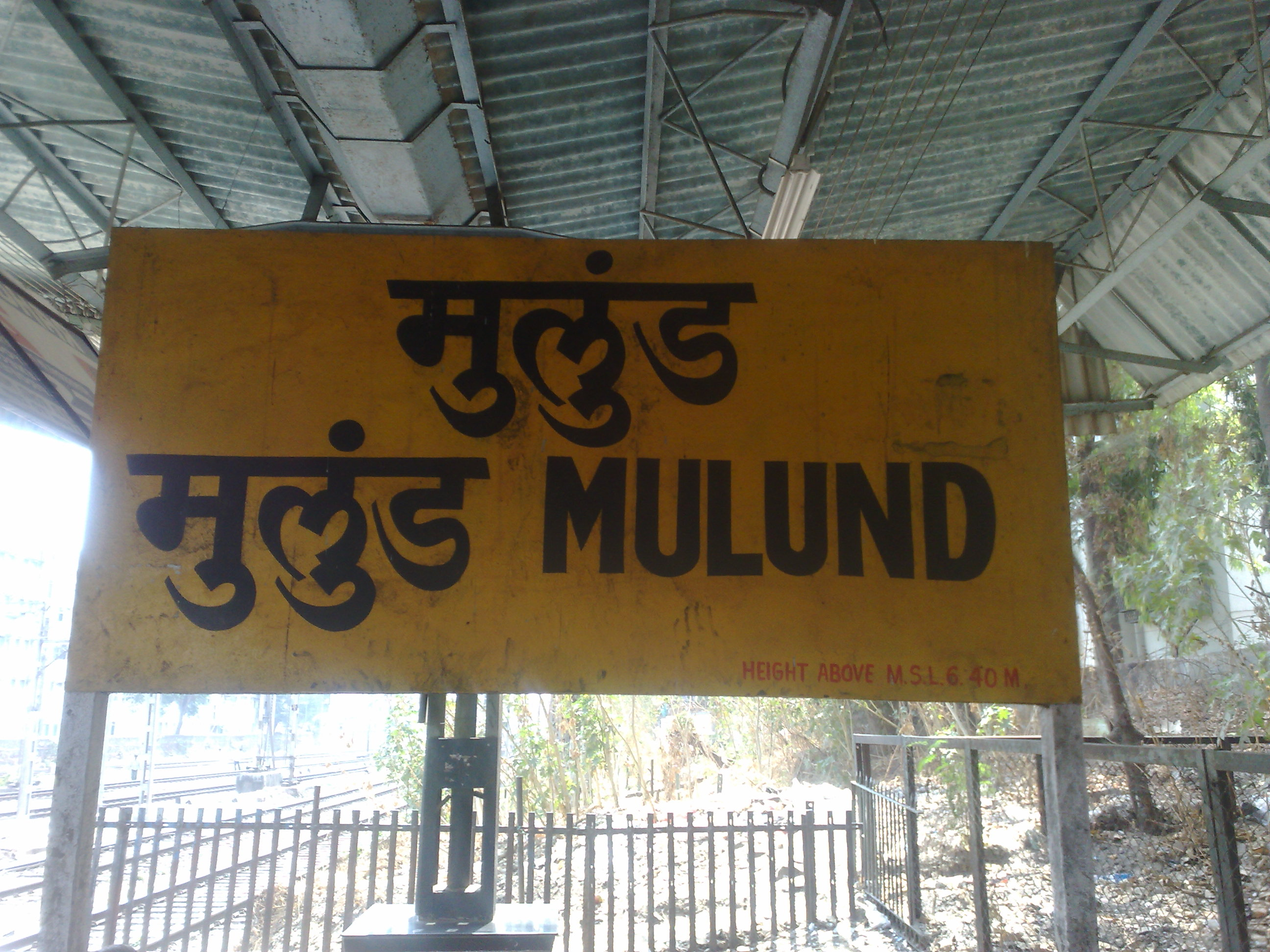
Station board
