= Pyaasa (2002 film) =

Hindi film directed by A. Muthu

- Directed by: A. Muthu
- Written by: Sanjeev Duggal; Jalees Sherwani
- Produced by: Ramesh Sharma
- Starring: Aftab Shivdasani; Yukta Mookhey
- Cinematography: Harmeet Singh; Sanjay Malwankar
- Edited by: Sachin Adurkar
- Music by: Sanjeev-Darshan; Nikhil-Vinay; Anand Raj Anand; Daboo Malik
- Distributed by: Triple Aar Films
- Release date: 11 October 2002
- Running time: 145 minutes
- Country: India
- Language: Hindi

Pyaasa (transl. eternally thirsty) is a 2002 Indian Hindi-language romance drama thriller film directed by A. Muthu. The film stars Aftab Shivdasani and Yukta Mookhey in the lead roles.

== Synopsis ==
Suraj aspires to be a millionaire some day, but all hopes of making it big are squashed by his father and uncle, who don't approve of selling their ancestral land. Sheetal, a tycoon, hires Suraj to work for her business empire. Prem is Suraj's cousin and an accomplished businessman, whom Suraj detests. What Suraj does not know is that Sheetal is just using him as a pawn to exact revenge from Prem and his father, Dharam Thakur.

== Cast ==
- Aftab Shivdasani as Suraj Thakur
- Yukta Mookhey as Sheetal Oberoi
- Zulfi Syed as Prem Thakur
- Anang Desai as Dharam Thakur
- Akhilendra Mishra as Mr. Oberoi
- Govind Namdeo as Mr. Thakur
- Saadhika as Simran Thakur
- Smita Jaykar as Mrs. Thakur
- Arif Zakaria as Roshan Oberoi
- Mukesh Tiwari
- Sanjay Narvekar
- Sardool Sikander in a special appearance
- Satyavrat Mudgal as Aftab's Friend

== Soundtrack ==
#	Title	Singer(s)	Lyricist	Composer
1	"Milti Hai Jhukti Hai"	Udit Narayan, Alka Yagnik	Praveen Bhardwaj	Daboo Malik
2	"Tere Pyar Ka Chhaya Nasha"	Adnan Sami, Sunidhi Chauhan, Abhijeet	Faaiz Anwar	Sanjeev-Darshan
3	"Milte Milte Sanam"	Udit Narayan, Alka Yagnik	Faiz Anwar	Nikhil-Vinay
4	"Soni Roop Di"	Sardool Sikander	Dev Kohli	Anand Raaj Anand
5	"Na Jaane Mera Kya Hoga"	Sonu Nigam	Faiz Anwar	Sanjeev-Darshan
6	"Tere Pyar Ka Nasha"	Abhijeet, Sunidhi Chauhan	Faiz Anwar	Sanjeev-Darshan
7	"Usko Pata Hai"	Sudesh Bhosle	Narendra Bedi	Sanjeev-Darshan
8	"Aankhon Mein Leke Pyar"	Udit Narayan, Karsan Sanghita, Kavita Krishnamurthy	Faiz Anwar	Sanjeev-Darshan
9	"Is Mohabbat Ke Siva"	Sonu Nigam, Alka Yagnik	Faiz Anwar	Sanjeev-Darshan

== Reception ==
Taran Adarsh of IndiaFM gave the film 1 out of 5, writing, "PYAASA is a typical commercial film with loads of everything, romance, action, songs. Presented in an oft-repeated fashion, the film turns out to be a predictable fare as the plot thickens."
