= The Purvanchal Files =

- Directed by: Swarup Ghosh
- Produced by: Raj Vasoya
- Starring: Sidharth Gupta; Shivani Thakur; Zarina Wahab; Govind Namdev
- Cinematography: Jatan Prajapati
- Edited by: Tapos Ghosh
- Music by: Somen Kutty Sarkar
- Production company: Rudraksh Telefilms
- Distributed by: Reliance Entertainment
- Release date: 22 September 2023
- Country: India
- Language: Hindi

The Purvanchal Files is a 2023 Indian Hindi language action-drama film featuring Sidharth Gupta, Zarina Wahab. The film was directed by Swarup Ghosh, in what is his Hindi film debut. Raj Vasoya produced the film. Rajendra Tripathi wrote the story and screenplay, and Nisar Akhtar wrote the compelling lines that give the story a sense of urgency and purpose. Simon Sarkar Kuti wrote the music and background score.

== Synopsis ==
This is the story of a police officer’s fight for justice and his mission to cleanse the corrupt system in Purvanchal. Set in the eastern region of Uttar Pradesh, the narrative unfolds against a backdrop of rampant crime and corruption.

DSP Ritesh Pandey takes charge of Ghazipur city, determined to free it from the grip of gang wars, criminal networks, and political exploitation. The city lives under the shadow of MLA Abhisar Rana and his son, whose unchecked power and brutality dominate both the system and the streets.

Ritesh Pandey, known for his honesty and integrity, stands firm against Rana. Their clash becomes more than a personal rivalry—it is a battle of principles, where truth and justice confront tyranny and corruption.

== Cast ==
- Sidharth Gupta as DSP Ritesh Pandey
- Shivani Thakur as Reporter Ragini
- Zarina Wahab as Ritesh Pandey's Mother
- Govind Namdev as Vidhayak (MLA) Abhisar Rana
- Mukesh Tiwari as Inspector Vikram Rathod
- Hemant Pandey as Constable Dayashankar Pandey
- Amita Nangia as Govind Namdev's Wife
- Heramb Tripathi as Govind Namdev's Son

== Production ==
Filming took place in Mumbai, Mirzapur (Uttar Pradesh), and Nainital.

== Reception ==
A review at TalkiesCorner described the film as "a gripping crime drama that takes viewers on a roller-coaster ride through the underbelly of Uttar Pradesh’s crime-infested Purvanchal region." FilmInformation found that it was "a decently made film but it will not be able to do much at the turnstiles because of lack of face value and poor marketing." Another review insisted that "Although it’s a Hindi movie, there is a touch of the local regional language of the Purvanchal region.”
