= Callens =

Callens is a Flemish surname. Notable people with the surname include:

- Brigitta Callens (born 1980), Miss Belgium 1999
- Els Callens (born 1970), Belgian tennis player
- Norbert Callens (1924–2005) Belgian road bicycle racer
- Alexander Callens (born 1992) Peruvian footballer
- Joseph Callens (born 1894) Belgian swimmer and diver
