= Govind Namdev =

Indian film actor (born 1954)

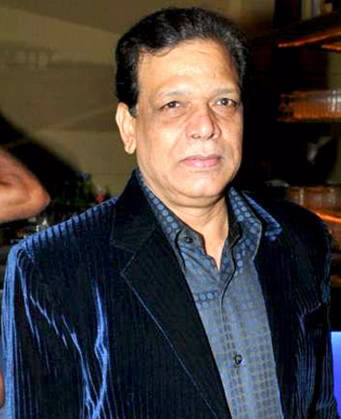
- Namdev at an event in 2010
- Born: 3 September 1954 (age 72); Sagar, Madhya Pradesh, India
- Occupation: Actor
- Years active: 1992–present
- Spouse: Sudha Namdev

Govind Namdev (born 3 September 1954) is an Indian actor who appears in Hindi films. Namdev made his debut as a corrupt cop in David Dhawan's Shola Aur Shabnam (1992). He has acted in numerous movies, often as a villain. He is an alumnus of the National School of Drama 1978. After that he joined NSD repertory company and worked there for 12 to 13 years as an actor.

Some of his most notable work has been in the films Oh My God, Dum Maro Dum, Bandit Queen, Virasat, Satya, Kachche Dhaage, Mast, Thakshak, Phir Bhi Dil Hai Hindustani, Pukar, Raju Chacha, Sarfarosh, Satta, Qayamat and Main Madhuri Dixit Banna Chahti Hoon, Johny Gadhaar. He also starred in Kaashi in Search of Ganga.

== Film ==
- Saudagar (1991)
- Shola Aur Shabnam (1992)
- Chamatkar (1992)
- Sardar (1994) – Shankar, Sardar Patel's assistant
- Aankhen (1993)
- Andaz (1994)
- Bandit Queen (1994)
- Prem (1995)
- Prem Granth (1996)
- Virasat (1997)
- Zor (1998)
- Satya (1998)
- Sarfarosh (1999)
- Mast (1999)
- Thakshak (1999)
- Phir Bhi Dil Hai Hindustani (2000) as Chief Minister Mushran
- Pukar (2000)
- Raju Chacha (2000)
- Dr. Babasaheb Ambedkar (2000) – Subedar Ramji Maloji Sakpal, B. R. Ambedkar's father
- Lajja (2001)
- Badhaai Ho Badhaai (2002)
- Kuch Tum Kaho Kuch Hum Kahein (2002) as Virendra Pratap Singh
- Dil Hai Tumhaara (2002)
- Pyaasa (2002)
- Dum (2003)
- Satta (2003)
- Qayamat (2003)
- Main Madhuri Dixit Banna Chahti Hoon (2003)
- Garv: Pride and Honour (2004) as Kashinath Trivedi
- Gayab (2004)
- Ab Tumhare Hawale Watan Saathiyo (2004) as Maqbool Butt
- Chaahat - Ek Nasha (2005)
- Nigehbaan - The Third Eye (2005)
- Ramji Londonwaley (2005)
- Ankush - The Command (2006)
- Kachchi Sadak (2006)
- Johnny Gaddaar (2007)
- Kuchh Khel Kuchh Masti (2007)
- Yuvvraaj (2008)
- Nepali (2008)
- Sarkar Raj (2008) as Hassan Qazi
- Memsahab - Lost In A Mirage (2008)
- Khallballi - Fun Unlimited (2008)
- Kusar Prasad Ka Bhoot (2009)
- The White Land (2009)
- Prateeksha (2009)
- Tumhare Liye (2009)
- Kabootar (2009)
- Wanted (2009) as DCP Ashraf Taufiq Khan
- Jaane Bhi Do Yaron (2009)
- Ajab Prem Ki Ghazab Kahani (2009) as Pitambar Jalan
- Dum Maaro Dum (2011) as Rane
- Singham (2011)
- Ammaa Ki Boli (2012)
- Jeena Hai Toh Thok Daal (2012)
- Heroine (2012)
- OMG – Oh My God! (2012) – Siddheswar Maharaj Priest
- Ata Pata Laapata (2012)
- Ramaiya Vastavaiya (2013) – Zamindar Jaiswal
- Boss (2013) as Vishwaas Pradhan
- Bin Phere Free Me Ttere (2013)
- Spark (2014)
- Singham Returns (2014)
- Ab Tak Chhappan 2 (2015)
- Hai Golmaal in White House (2015)
- Main Gabbar (2015)
- JD (2016) as Divakar Verma
- Anna (2016)
- Vekh Baraatan Challiyan (Punjabi movie, 2017)
- Shaadi Mein Zaroor Aana (2017) – Shyam Sunder "S. S." Shukla, Aarti's father
- Kashi - In search of Ganga as Balwant Pandey (2018)
- Dassehra as Chief Minister Prasadi Lal (2018)
- Sur Sapata Marathi Film as School Teacher (2019)
- Ram Ki Janmabhoomi (2019) as Zafar Khan
- Main Zaroor Aaunga (2019)
- Jhalki (2019)
- Officer Arjun Singh IPS Batch 2000 (2019)
- Radhe (2021) – Senior Police Officer
- Ek Nashebaaz (2022) – Rehabilitation house director
- Decent Boy (2022)
- Bhool Bhulaiyaa 2 (2022)
- Ramrajya (2022) Lucky's Guruji
- Shubh Nikah (2023) Shyama Lal Mishra
- OMG 2 (2023) Pujari
- The Purvanchal Files (2023)
- Sam Bahadur (2023)
- Ghuspaithiya (2024)
- Raid 2 (2025)
- Hari Hara Veera Mallu (2025; Telugu film)
- Gandhi Talks (2026)
- Krishnavataram Part 1: The Heart (Hridayam) (2026)
- Kashi to Kashmir - (Upcoming)
- The Delhi Files - (Upcoming)
- Golmaal 5 - (Upcoming)

=== Television ===
- Parivartan – Hasmukh Ajmera
- Byomkesh Bakshi (Episode: Kiley Ka Rahasya) (1993) – Ramkishore Singh
- Aahat (Season 1) 1995-2001 Episode 6: Tumhari Julia (1995) – Gomes and Episode 20-21 Gambler (1995) as Atul
- Mahayagya (1997–98) – Chhote Thakur
- Aashirwad (1998–2001) – Purushottam Choudhary
- Abhimaan (1999–00) – Police Commissioner
- Your Honour (2000)
- Tales of Lamaas (2020)
- Search: The Naina Murder Case (2025)

== Awards ==
- 1999: Screen Award for Best Actor (Television) - Mahayagya
- 1999: Nominated: Filmfare Best Villain Award for Satya
- 2009: Kabootar: Best Actor at the Osian's Film Fan
- Screen Award for Best Performance Of the Year-Negative (Male)
- Osian Cine Fan International Award for Best Actor in 2012
- Maharashtra Kala Niketan Film Award
- RAPA Award for Best Performance Male
- Madhya Pradesh Ratna
