= Eva Ekvall =

Venezuelan TV news anchor, and former Miss Venezuela

- Born: Eva Mónica Anna Ekvall Johnson; March 15, 1983; Caracas, Venezuela
- Died: December 17, 2011 (aged 28); Houston, Texas, U.S.
- Spouse: John Fabio Bermudez (m. 2007)
- Children: 1
- Beauty pageant titleholder
- Title: Miss Venezuela 2000
- Hair color: Brown
- Eye color: Blue
- Major competitions: Miss Venezuela 2000 (Winner); Miss Universe 2001 (3rd Runner-Up)

Eva Mónica Anna Ekvall Johnson (March 15, 1983 – December 17, 2011) was a Venezuelan television news anchor, author, advocate in the fight against breast cancer, fashion model and beauty pageant titleholder who was crowned Miss Venezuela 2000. After winning the competition, she had a brief career in television before being diagnosed with advanced breast cancer.

== Early life ==
Ekvall was born in Caracas, Venezuela. She was raised in both the United States and Venezuela and was fluent in English and Spanish from childhood. Ekvall attended the Academia Washington of Caracas. Her father, Eric Ekvall, was an American of Swedish descent, who had lived in Venezuela since the early 1980s and worked as an actor and political consultant. Her mother, Dawn Johnson, was born in Jamaica, and once ran a small modelling agency in Alaska, where she met Eva's father. Eva grew up with an older brother, Alec, who is a musician.

== Career ==
Aged 17, Ekvall was crowned Miss Venezuela 2000, and the next year was third runner-up in the Miss Universe Pageant. As a Buddhist, she was the first non-Christian to have won the title of Miss Venezuela.

After a brief period as an actress on the Televen TV show Las Rottenmayer, Ekvall went on to earn a degree in journalism from Universidad Santa María in Caracas. Shortly afterwards she joined El Noticiero as a co-anchor for Televen. Ekvall expressed interest in doing radio and could fill in as a temporary host of a radio program on Circuito Onda. She also worked for Sexto Poder newspaper as an online interviewer by means of BBM, the first of its kind on the Venezuelan printed media.

As a model, Ekvall was frequently featured in magazines including Sambil and Ocean Drive.

== Personal life ==
Ekvall married radio producer John Fabio Bermúdez in September 2007. The couple had one daughter, Miranda, born in July 2009.

=== Cancer ===
In February 2010, just months after giving birth to her only child, Ekvall was diagnosed with advanced breast cancer, and underwent eight months of treatment that included chemotherapy, radiotherapy and a double radical mastectomy. She chronicled this experience in a book of photographs, Fuera de Foco (Out of Focus), released in December 2010. She went on to become an advocate for SenosAyuda, a cancer awareness group.

=== Death ===
When told to have had a recurrence of her disease, Ekvall moved to the United States and checked into University General Hospital in Houston, Texas. Despite the intense medical treatment, her health condition began deteriorating and she died in the afternoon of December 17, 2011. In a statement, Ekvall's family said her remains were to be cremated in Houston.

Ekvall's death brought an outpouring of condolences from Venezuelans, including some prominent artists and politicians. Ekvall's husband posted a photo on Twitter Sunday showing a close-up of his hand holding hers, resting on a hospital bed, with the words "Always together... I love you wife". On March 1, 2012, her husband established the Eva Ekvall Foundation.

== See also ==
- List of television presenters

Awards and achievements
Preceded by (Canada) Kim Yee	Miss Universe 3rd Runner-Up; 2001	Succeeded by (South Africa) Vanessa Carreira
Preceded by Claudia Moreno	Venezuelan delegate to Miss Universe; 2001	Succeeded by Cynthia Lander
Preceded by Martina Thorogood	Miss Venezuela; 2000	Succeeded by Cynthia Lander
Preceded by Maria Flores	Miss Apure; 2000	Succeeded by María Carballo
