= Vanessa Cárdenas =

- Born: Vanessa María Cárdenas Bravo; May 4, 1981 (age 44); Maracaibo, Venezuela
- Height: 1.77 m (5 ft 10 in)
- Beauty pageant titleholder
- Hair color: Black
- Eye color: Black

Vanessa María Cárdenas Bravo (born May 4, 1981) is a Venezuelan model and beauty pageant titleholder. She was the representative of Venezuela at the Miss World 2000 pageant in London, United Kingdom on November 30, 2000. She was born in Maracaibo, Venezuela, the daughter of Chilean Sonia Bravo, a delegate of the 1968 Miss Chile pageant, who won the title of Miss Objetivo International 1968 in São Paulo, Brazil.

Awards and achievements
Preceded by Martina Thorogood (Miranda)	Miss World Venezuela; 2000	Succeeded by Andreína Prieto (Zulia)
