= Memsahab =

- Official Movie Poster
- Directed by: Arshad Siddiqui
- Written by: Arshad Siddiqui
- Produced by: Kailash Shukla
- Starring: Yukta Mookhey and Vijay Raaz
- Edited by: Bibhuti Bhushan
- Release date: 20 June 2008
- Country: India
- Language: Hindi

Memsahab is an Indian Hindi-language film released in 2008. The film stars Yukta Mookhey and Vijay Raaz. Memsahab is a woman-oriented movie with a social message of non-violence. Mookhey plays the role of a Sikh woman forced into prostitution after the death of her parents. Her character was inspired by Shabana Azmi's award-winning role of a prostitute in the 1983 film ‘Mandi’.

== Synopsis ==
The film is based on the aftermath of the 1984 riots involving a section of Congress party activists and Sikhs in Delhi and other parts of northern India. Congress party activists targeted and killed thousands of Sikhs.

Yukta Mookhey plays the character of Anjali, who is a victim of the riots and is pushed into prostitution. Anjali’s mother is raped by the rioters, and her father is shot dead. Anjali grows up with traumatic memories of her childhood.

Anjali is one of many women working as a prostitute in Kamathipura (a red-light district in Mumbai, where filming also took place); every night each of these women meets with a new ‘Sahab’ (translation: Sir, Master or Boss).

After some unexpected incidents, Anjali stumbles upon her parents' killers and starts hunting them down one by one. In the process, she realizes that violence will not help her get her parents back, and that even after taking revenge she still cannot not erase her traumatic childhood memories, leading her to take an unexpected decision.

== Cast ==
- Yukta Mookhey as Anjali / Memsaheb
- Vijay Raaz as Insp Ajit Munde
- Govind Namdeo as Kashinath
- Rafique Khan as Rahul
- Rajpal Yadav as Naurangi
- Ehsaan Khan as Jayant Lal
- Monish Anand as Prakash
- Akshay Verma as Nandu
- Nilanjana Bhattacharya as Pooja
- Shoorveer Tyagi as Arpita
- Rajeeta Kochhar as Sunita
- Sambhavna Seth as Priya Pardesia

== Soundtrack ==
The soundtrack features seven songs including the item number "Piya Pardesia" by Sambhavna Seth. Music for the film was composed by Murlidhar Alia, with original lyrics by Ibrahim Ashq.

Track List

1. The Soul of Memsahab
2. Qatil Haseena Hoon
3. Piya Pardesia
4. Pata Dhadkanon Se Udit Narayan, Alka Yagnik
5. Padoon Tore Main Paiyan
6. Kya Khoya Kya Paya
7. Piya Pardesia (Remix)
