= Ainett Stephens =

Venezuelan television host and actress

- Born: Ainett Mery Stephens Sifontes; 28 January 1982 (age 44); Ciudad Guayana, Bolívar, Venezuela
- Occupations: model, television personality
- Years active: 2000–present
- Modelling information
- Height: 182 cm (5 ft 11 1/2 in)
- Hair colour: Black
- Eye colour: Black

Ainett Stephens (born 28 January 1982) is a Venezuelan actress, tv host, model and beauty pageant titleholder.

== Biography ==
She was among the ten semi-finalists of the Miss Venezuela 2000 beauty contest and subsequently posed for a calendar and the benefits of which went to the people of the Amazon rainforest. After beginning a career as an underwear model in South America, she arrived in Italy in 2004.

In late 2005 she made a nude calendar for the men magazine Fox Uomo (for year 2006). She hosted three seasons (2005, 2006 and 2007) of Real TV aired by Italia 1. In 2006 she played the role of Black Cat in early evening quiz show Mercante in fiera hosted by Pino Insegno on Italia 1 and in the same period she posed again for a nude calendar (for year 2007) for the sports magazine Controcampo. In March 2007 she hosted, with Daniele Bossari, the television quiz Azzardo aired by Italia 1. In 2008 she hosted, along with Taiyo Yamanouchi, the 3rd season of the comedy program of Rai 3 La tintoria. She took part, in 2011, in the cast of the Saturday Night Live from Milano, a comedy show aired on Italia 1.

She host, on Rai 3, 3 editions (2007-2009) of the International Circus Festival of Monte-Carlo. In 2011 she made her debut as actress for cinema reciting in Amici miei - Come tutto ebbe inizio, a film directed by Neri Parenti.

In May–June 2014 she took part as a pundit and showgirl in the cast, together with Chiara Nasti and Sofia Valleri, of the late night show Chiambretti Supermarket hosted on Italia 1 by Piero Chiambretti. In late 2021 she took part in the sixth season of Grande Fratello VIP as contestant.

=== Personal life ===
Ainett Stephens, after nine years of engagement, married the Italian businessman Nicola Radici on 3 September 2015. This couple had their first child, named Christopher, on 18 October 2015, the first for her and the second for Radici.

== Filmography ==
=== As an actress ===
Year	Title	Role	Notes
2011	Amici miei – Come tutto ebbe inizio	Alyssa	Feature film debut as an actress

=== As herself ===
Year	Title	Role	Notes
2005–2007	Real TV	Herself/ Host	Docu-reality series (seasons 8–10)
2006	Mercante in fiera	Herself/ Black Cat	Game show
2007	Azzardo	Herself/ Co-host	Game show (season 3)
2007-2009	International Circus Festival of Monte-Carlo	Herself/ Host	Annual ceremony
2011	Saturday Night Live from Milano	Various roles	Comedy show
2021	Grande Fratello VIP	Herself/ Contestant	Reality show
