= V. G. Vaze College of Arts, Science and Commerce =

The KET's V. G. Vaze College of Arts, Science & Commerce (Autonomous)

Location
- Mithagar Road; Mulund, Maharashtra, 400081; India; 19.1630°N 72.9575°E

Information
- Other name: Kelkar College
- Type: Private
- Established: 1984; 42 years ago
- Founder: Shri Govind Damdodar alias Bhausaheb Kelkar
- Principal: Prof.(Dr.)Preeta Nilesh
- Language: English
- Campus type: Urban
- Affiliation: University of Mumbai
- Website: vazecollege.net

The Kelkar Education Trust's Vinayak Ganesh Vaze College of Arts, Science & Commerce (Autonomous) (more commonly known as Kelkar College or Vaze College), is a Mumbai University affiliated college located in Mulund East, Mumbai. The college was established by the Kelkar Education Trust in 1984 in memory of its founder trustee, late Shri. Govind Damodar Vaze.

== History ==
Bhausaheb Kelkar was an industrialist who manufactured fragrances. He had been promoting educational activities through donations to institutions and grants to underprivileged students. A Kelkar Education Trust was set up by Bhausaheb in Mulund in 1979 to start a college. Kelkar College was started by the Kelkar-Vaze family in the year 1984. The college managed to get affiliation from University of Mumbai soon and is the youngest college to get permanent affiliation from the university of Mumbai.

== Location ==
It is located at Mithagar area of Mulund East, a northeastern suburb of Mumbai. Surrounded by lush green mangroves on three sides. College is at 15 minutes walk-able distance from Mulund Railway station.

== Affiliation and accreditation ==
The college is permanently affiliated to the University of Mumbai since 1990. It was also later recognized by UGC (University grants commission).

Kelkar College is the first affiliated Arts, Science and Commerce institution in the state of Maharashtra which was assessed for accreditation by National Assessment and Accreditation Council (NAAC), which the institution of UGC had started. College received five star status in 1998, reassessed in 2005 and assessed for third cycle in 2012 (Third time) with an "A" grade from NAAC.

V.G. Vaze College was granted Autonomy in 2020.

== Extra curricular activities ==
- Cultural Committee
- Theatre Wing Veethee Vaze Rangakarmi
- Marathi Bhasha and Vangmay Mandal
- NSS Unit
- Dhruva Sanskrut Mahotsav
- CINELITT (Cinema and Literature Club)
- English Literary Association
- Vaze Centre for Talent Search

== Courses ==
The college offers various professional courses, Post graduate programs, and advanced diploma under the dual degree program.

- PhD: economics, zoology, chemistry, botany, life sciences
- PG programmes: PG by research in botany, zoology, chemistry
- PG by papers in zoology, chemistry, MSc IT, MSc biotech
- UG degree: commerce, arts and science. In all 122 subject combinations.
- Self-financing collaborative programme: post graduate diploma in perfumery and cosmetic management

== Students' Council ==
As per section 40 (2)(b) of Maharashtra University Act, 1994, the college has set up a body of 22 nominated students, on behalf of all the students of the college, to represent various classes and disciplines.

== Festival ==
The college hosts an inter college festival named "Dimensions". It generally takes place during the month of December every year. Every year a theme is chosen, and accordingly the fest revolves around it.

The recent year of the fest - D’22 was termed as “Best Ever” being held after a gap of two years due to the pandemic. Nevertheless, the offline comeback of the festival was grand with the highest recorded footfall of 20,000+ with support of big brands as sponsors like Sugar Cosmetics, Sony Marathi, SBI and much more.

Year	Theme Name
2013	Back to Innocence
2014	Tour De World
2015	The Age of Superheroes
2016	The Theater of Dreams
2017	Cosmic Udaan
2018	Lumos
2019	Palace Of Lost Things
2020	A Toast to Transition
2022	Cassette You
2023	Elemental Cascade
2024	Alchemy of Mirage
2025	Vinyl Realms
2026	The lumnious Canopy

== In popular culture ==
Several popular movies and web series, including Gully Boy, Blackout (2024 film), Half CA, and Saare Jahan Se Accha (2025 TV series), were primarily shot on this campus.

Additionally, the popular Hindi song “Sher Aaya Sher” was also filmed here.

== Notable alumni ==
- Rucha Hasabnis, Hindi television actress
- Yukta Mookhey, Miss World 1999
- Tejashree Pradhan, Marathi television actress
- Manasi Salvi, Hindi television actress
- Ajinkya Rahane, Indian cricketer
- Prajakta Koli, YouTuber and blogger
- Mayuri Wagh, Marathi television actress
- Rashmi Thackeray, Editor of Saamna & wife of Uddhav Thackeray

== See also ==
- University of Mumbai
