= Miss Universe 2000 =

Beauty pageant edition

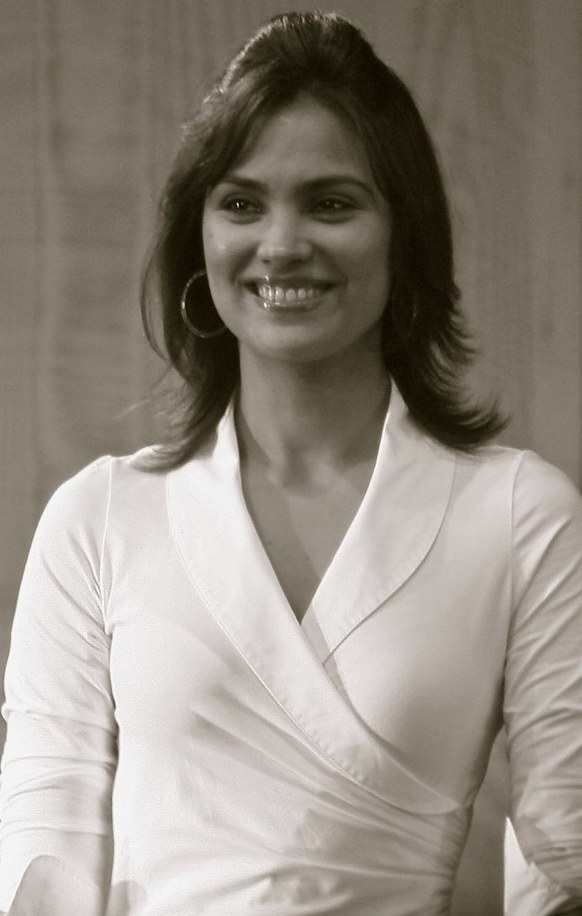
- Lara Dutta
- Date: 12 May 2000
- Presenters: Sinbad; Ali Landry; Julie Moran
- Entertainment: Elvis Crespo; Dave Koz; Montell Jordan; Anna Vissi
- Venue: Eleftheria Indoor Hall, Nicosia, Cyprus
- Broadcaster: CBS(international); CyBC (official broadcaster)
- Entrants: 79
- Placements: 10
- Withdrawals: Austria; Bonaire; Barbados; Cook Islands; Curaçao; Guyana; Nicaragua; Northern Mariana Islands; Suriname; Turkey; United States Virgin Islands; Zambia
- Returns: Bulgaria; Denmark; Guam; Netherlands; Norway; Sint Martin; Zimbabwe
- Winner: Lara Dutta; India
- Congeniality: Tamara Scaroni, Aruba
- Best National Costume: Letty Murray, Mexico
- Photogenic: Helen Lindes, Spain

Miss Universe 2000 was the 49th Miss Universe pageant, held at the Eleftheria Indoor Hall in Nicosia, Cyprus, on 12 May 2000.

At the conclusion of the event, Mpule Kwelagobe of Botswana crowned Lara Dutta of India as Miss Universe 2000. It is the country's second victory in the pageant's history after Sushmita Sen won in 1994.

Contestants from seventy-nine countries and territories competed in this year's pageant. The competition was hosted by Sinbad, with Miss USA 1996 Ali Landry and Julie Moran providing commentary and analysis throughout the event. Elvis Crespo, Dave Koz, Montell Jordan, and Anna Vissi performed in this year's pageant.

== Background ==
=== Location and date ===
Nicosia was announced as host city of the pageant on 1 July 1999. The country invested $3.5 million in the event, in the hope that the publicity would increase tourism, the island's main industry.

Conservative Cypriot church leaders protested the decision to hold the pageant on the island, claiming that millennium celebrations of the birth of Christ were more important and that the event was scandalous and would promote female nudity.

=== Selection of participants ===
Seventy-nine countries and territories competed in the pageant. Four candidates were appointed to their position to replace the original winner.

==== Replacements ====
Miss Universe Hungary 2000 first runner-up Izabella Kiss replaced Miss Universe Hungary 2000 Ágnes Nagy as the representative of their country for personal reasons. Miss Italia 1999 Manila Nazzaro was slated to compete in this edition. However, the Miss Italia Organization lost their Miss Universe license due to objections of the Miss Universe Organization that the contest was opened to married women and mothers, and the license was transferred to Italian actress Clarissa Burt who organized The Miss for Miss Universe contest which will select the new Italian representative to Miss Universe. Annalisa Guadalupi won the pageant. Miss Russia 1999 first runner-up Svetlana Goreva was appointed to represent Russia as Miss Russia 1999 Anna Kruglova is underage, and Miss Russia 1997–1998 Yelena Rogozhina won the Miss Europe 1999 contest.

Initially, Miss Venezuela 1999 Martina Thorogood was chosen to represent their country at both Miss Universe and Miss World 1999. However, Miss Universe officials objected to this as Thorogood placed first runner-up at Miss World 1999 and there was a chance that she could become Miss World should the winner resign or lose her crown. Miss Universe officials also objected the participation of Miss Venezuela 1999 first runner-up Norkys Batista because she was not the national official titleholder. Finally, a smaller pageant was held among delegates who had competed in previous Miss Venezuela competitions, and Claudia Moreno was chosen to compete at Miss Universe.

==== Returns and withdrawals ====
This edition marked the returns of Sint Maarten who last competed in 1982; Denmark who last competed in 1996, and Bulgaria, Guam, the Netherlands, Norway, and Zimbabwe who last competed in 1999.

Austria, Barbados, Bonaire, Guyana, Nicaragua, Suriname, and the United States Virgin Islands withdrew for undisclosed reasons. Miss Cook Islands 1999, Liana Scott, and Miss Zambia 2000, Sidonia Mwape, withdrew due to lack of sponsorship. Miss Curaçao 2000, Jozaïne Wall, withdrew for being underage. Michelle Boyer Sablan of the Northern Mariana Islands withdrew for personal reasons. Miss Turkey 2000 first runner-up, Gamze Özçelik was replaced by Cansu Dere for being underage. However, Dere was forbidden by the Turkish government to travel to the Miss Universe 2000 pageant in Cyprus, due to the current tense Turkish-Cypriot relationships over Northern Cyprus.

== Results ==
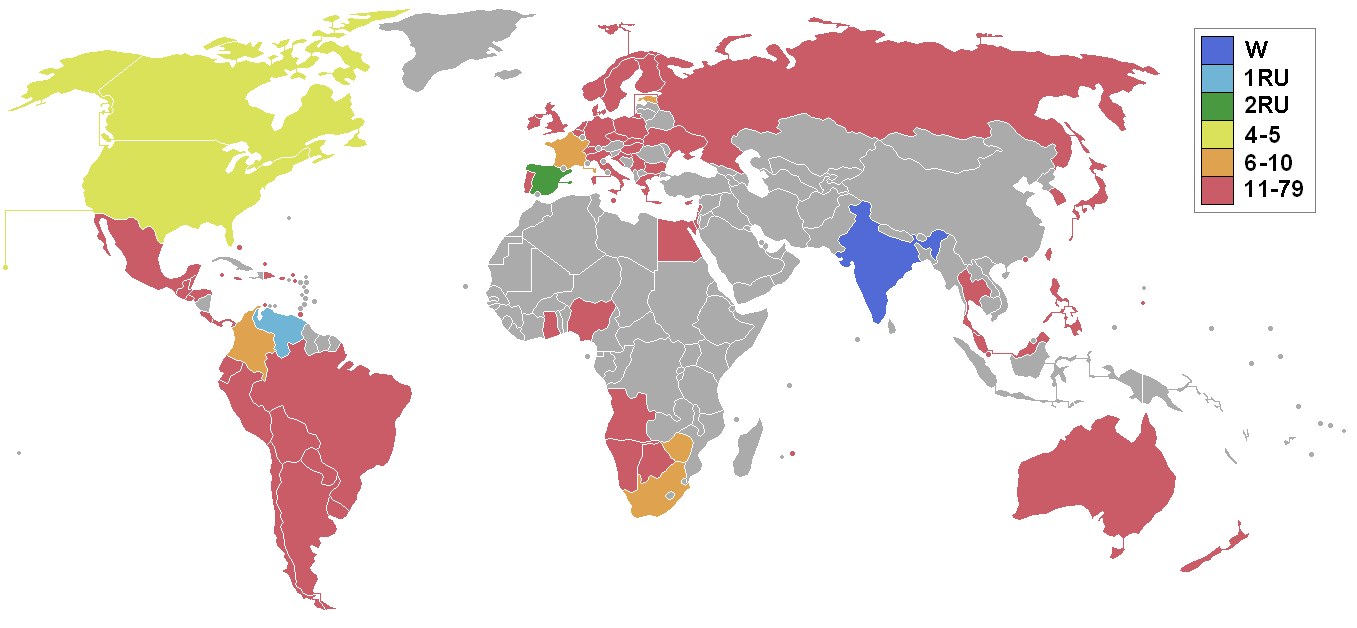
Miss Universe 2000 participating nations and results

=== Placements ===
Placement	Contestant
Miss Universe 2000	India – Lara Dutta
1st Runner-Up	Venezuela – Claudia Moreno
2nd Runner-Up	Spain – Helen Lindes
Top 5	Canada – Kim Yee; United States – Lynnette Cole
Top 10	Colombia – Catalina Acosta; Estonia – Evelyn Mikomägi; France – Sonia Rolland; South Africa – Heather Hamilton; Zimbabwe – Corinne Crewe

=== Special awards ===
Award	Contestant
Best National Costume	Mexico – Leticia Murray
Miss Photogenic	Spain – Helen Lindes
Miss Congeniality	Aruba – Tamara Scaroni

== Pageant ==
=== Selection committee ===
==== Final telecast ====
- Tony Robbins
- Catherine Bell
- André Leon Talley
- Kim Alexis
- Cristián de la Fuente
- Debbie Allen
- Serena Altschul

== Contestants ==
Seventy-nine contestants competed for the title.

Country/Territory	Contestant	Age (Note: Ages at the time of the pageant)	Hometown
Angola	Eunice Manita	19	Luanda
Argentina	Andrea Nicastri	25	Buenos Aires
Aruba	Tamara Scaroni	23	San Nicolaas
Australia	Samantha Frost	22	Sydney
(The Bahamas) Bahamas	Mikala Moss	24	Nassau
Belgium	Joke Van de Velde	20	Ghent
Belize	Shiemicka Richardson	26	Belize City
Bolivia	Yenny Vaca	18	Santa Cruz de la Sierra
Botswana	Joyce Molemoeng	21	Orapa
Brazil	Josiane Kruliskoski	20	Sinop
British Virgin Islands	Tausha Vanterpool	22	Tortola
Bulgaria	Magdalina Valchanova	22	Plovdiv
Canada	Kim Yee	22	Edmonton
Cayman Islands	Mona Lisa Tatum	22	George Town
Chile	Francesca Sovino	21	Valparaíso
Colombia	Catalina Acosta	22	Bogotá
Costa Rica	Laura Mata	22	San José
Croatia	Renata Lovrinčević	23	Split
Cyprus	Christy Groutidou	19	Nicosia
Czech Republic	Jitka Kocurová	20	Prague
Denmark	Heidi Meyer Vallentin	23	Copenhagen
Dominican Republic	Gilda Jovine	20	Santo Domingo
Ecuador	Gabriela Cadena	20	Guayaquil
Egypt	Rania El-Sayed	18	Cairo
El Salvador	Alexandra Rivas	20	San Salvador
Estonia	Evelyn Mikomägi	20	Tallinn
Finland	Suvi Miinala	19	Kemi
France	Sonia Rolland	18	Cluny
Germany	Sabrina Schepmann	18	Nauen
Ghana	Maame Esi Acquah	18	Cape Coast
(United Kingdom) Great Britain	Louise Lakin	21	Manchester
Greece	Eleni Skafida	21	Athens
Guam	Lisamarie Quinata	22	Hagåtña
Guatemala	Evelyn López	21	Guatemala City
Honduras	Flor Garcia	19	San Pedro Sula
Hong Kong	Sonija Kwok	25	Hong Kong
Hungary	Izabella Kiss	24	Budapest
India	Lara Dutta	22	Bengaluru
(Republic of Ireland) Ireland	Louise Doheny	19	Dublin
Israel	Nirit Bakshi	18	Beersheba
Italy	Annalisa Guadalupi	18	Rome
Jamaica	Saphire Longmore	24	Clarendon
Japan	Mayu Endo	24	Tokyo
Lebanon	Norma Elias Naoum	23	Beirut
Malaysia	Lynette Ludi	25	Kuching
Malta	Jolene Arpa	18	Santa Luċija
Mauritius	Jenny Arthemidor	18	Port Louis
Mexico	Leticia Murray	20	Hermosillo
Namibia	Mia de Klerk	20	Khomas
Netherlands	Chantal van Roessel	25	North Brabant
New Zealand	Tonia Peachey	19	Auckland
Nigeria	Matilda Kerry	19	Lagos
Norway	Tonje Kristin Wøllo	25	Buskerud
Panama	Analía Núñez	19	Panama City
Paraguay	Carolina Ramírez	20	Alto Paraná
Peru	Verónica Rueckner	19	Piura
Philippines	Nina Ricci Alagao	22	Makati
Poland	Emilia Raszynska	21	Warmia-Masuria
Portugal	Licinia Macedo	24	Madeira
Puerto Rico	Zoribel Fonalledas	22	Guaynabo
Russia	Svetlana Goreva	18	Moscow
Singapore	Eunice Olsen	22	Singapore
Sint Maarten	Angelique Romou	26	Philipsburg
Slovakia	Miroslava Kysucká	19	Bratislava
South Africa	Heather Hamilton	22	Gauteng
South Korea	Kim Yeon-joo	19	Seoul
Spain	Helen Lindes	18	Girona
Sweden	Valerie Aflalo	23	Malmö
Switzerland	Anita Buri	21	Berg
Taiwan	Lei-Ann Chang	22	Taipei
Thailand	Kulthida Yenprasert	21	Bangkok
Trinidad and Tobago	Heidi Rostant	22	Port of Spain
Turks and Caicos Islands	Clintina Gibbs	20	Cockburn Town
Ukraine	Natalie Shvachko	24	Dnipropetrovsk
United States	Lynnette Cole	22	Columbia
Uruguay	Giovanna Piazza	18	Montevideo
Venezuela	Claudia Moreno	22	Caracas
(Serbia and Montenegro) Yugoslavia	Lana Marić	19	Belgrade
Zimbabwe	Corinne Crewe	18	Harare
