= Yukta Mookhey =

Indian actress, civic activist and the winner of Miss World 1999

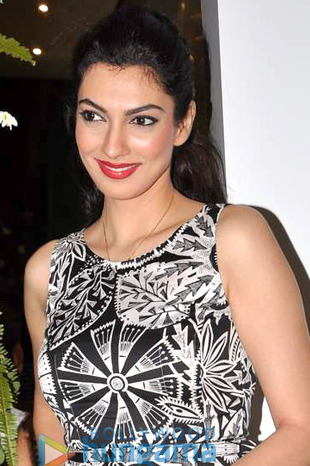
- Mookhey at a launch event for Marc Cain store in 2013
- Born: Yukta Inderlal Mookhey; 7 October 1977 or 7 October 1979 (49 or 47); Mulund, Maharashtra, India
- Education: Vaze College of Arts, Science and Commerce
- Occupations: Actress; civic activist; model
- Height: 5 ft 11 in (180 cm)
- Spouse: Prince Tuli (m. 2008; div. 2014)
- Children: 1
- Beauty pageant titleholder
- Years active: 1999–2019
- Hair colour: Black
- Eye colour: Brown

Yukta Inderlal Mookhey is an Indian actress, model, civic activist and the winner of Miss World 1999 pageant. She is the fourth Indian woman to win Miss World and was previously crowned as Femina Miss India World 1999. She has worked in Hindi, Tamil and Telugu films.

== Early life ==
Mookhey was born in Mulund in a Sindhi family and was raised in Dubai until Mookhey was seven years of age. Her family moved back to Mumbai in June 1986. Her mother Aroona used to run a grooming saloon in Santa Cruz, Mumbai and her father, Inderlal Mookhey was a former Managing Director of a clothing company. After school, she studied zoology at the V. G. Vaze College in Mumbai. She has a diploma in computer sciences from Aptech and has studied Hindustani classical music for three years.

== Pageantry ==
=== Femina Miss India ===
In 1999, Mookhey entered herself into the Femina Miss India contest, where she was shortlisted as a contestant. In the semifinal round during the grand finale, she was asked a question by judge Viv Richards - "How do you define a true sports person?", to which she answered:

"I would define a true sports person as the one who welcomes defeat as well as success with a healthy attitude and with a smile."

Mookhey proceeded to the succeeding round, where all her fellow Top 5 delegates were asked the same question - “In the context of the recent controversy, if you were Chelsea Clinton, what is the single most important advice, you as a daughter would you give to your parents Bill Clinton and Hillary Clinton, and why?”, to which she answered:

"If I was Chelsea Clinton, I would tell my parents that in the values that you have taught me, I still stand by you no matter what. And I hope we can set an example for the rest of the world to see what family values and ethics are all about. Thank you."

At the end of the event, she was crowned as Miss India World 1999 by the outgoing titleholder Annie Thomas, giving her the right to represent India at the Miss World 1999 contest.

=== Miss World ===
The 49th edition of the Miss World pageant was held on 4 December 1999 at Olympia, London and 93 delegates from around the world competed for the title. During the pageant's question and answer round, she was asked if she could be anyone in the world who would she want to be. Mookhey replied - “It would have to be Audrey Hepburn. It was her inner beauty, compassion and her aura. The calm that she had inside her reflected.”

At the end of the event, Mookhey was crowned as Miss World 1999 by her predecessor Linor Abargil from Israel. The first runner-up title was won by Martina Thorogood from Venezuela, followed by the second runner-up, Sonia Raciti of South Africa. Mookhey also won the Asia & Oceania's Queen of Beauty Award during the Miss World contest. Mookhey became the fourth woman from India to win Miss World after Reita Faria in 1966, Aishwarya Rai in 1994 and Diana Hayden in 1997.

== Social works ==
After Mookhey's tenure as Miss World, she involved herself in various social and charitable causes. She has worked for the people affected by HIV/AIDS, breast cancer and thalassemia. Mookhey has pledged to donate her organs. In connection with this, she stated, “This step will benefit someone, once I leave this world”. She also works as an educationist and provides motivational counselling in various platforms. She partnered with an NGO to guide young girls from the slums, nudging them towards self-contemplation, understanding their needs and help them to become aware of their bodies, through counseling.

She has voiced against illegal child labour carried out in India's firecracker industries, which is an offence under the Indian law. She has also aided the people with hearing impairment, from marginalised and low-income segment of the society. She expressed - “I have spent my time learning the Indian sign language because I feel that hearing impaired people have so much latent creativity and are hampered only by their inability to communicate. I would like to help them by drawing attention to this issue.”

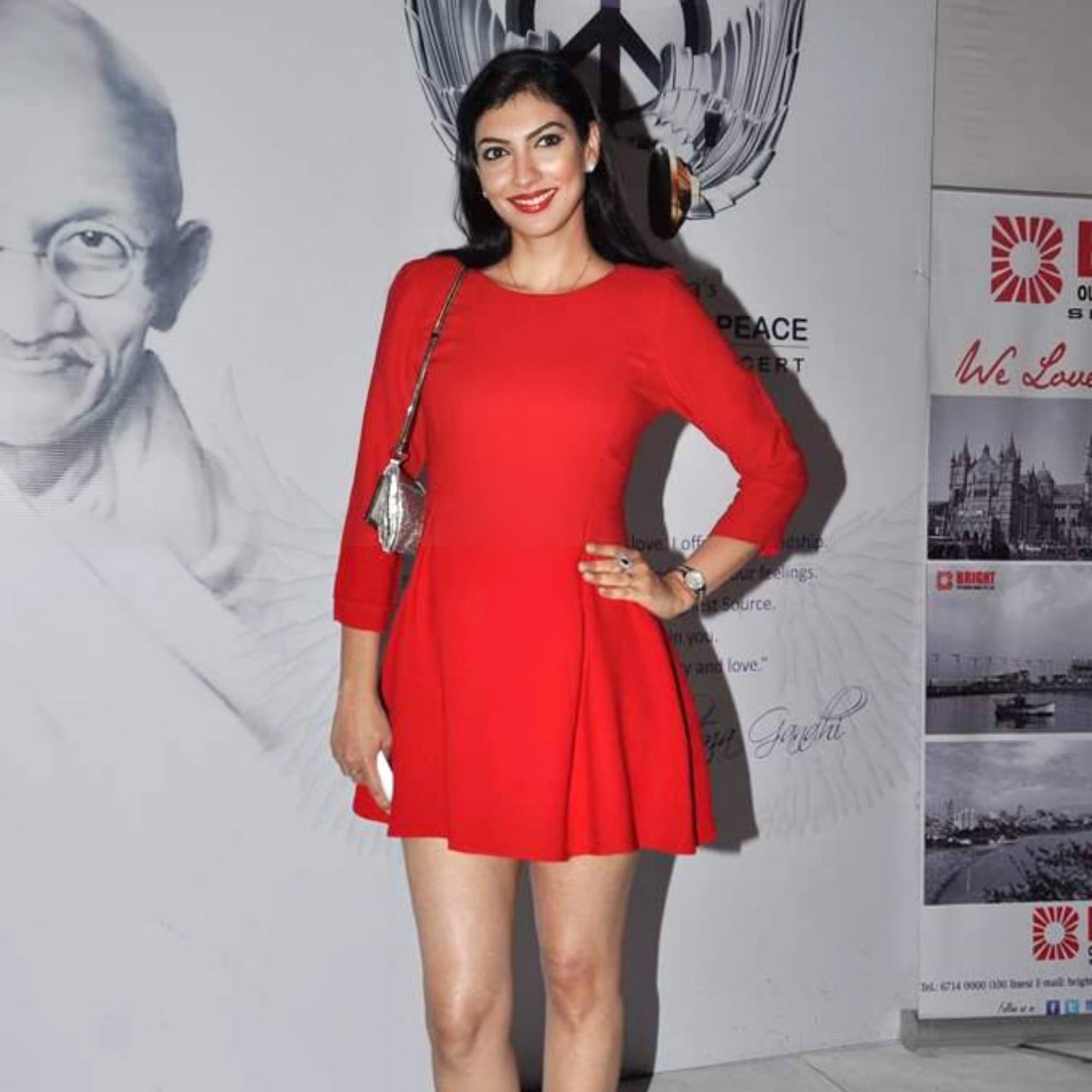
Mookhey at the 2013 Global Peace concert, in Mumbai's Andheri Sports Complex, on Martyrs' Day (30 January)

Mookhey is an environmental activist, and has participated in various clean drives and social movements to prevent deforestation. In 2018, she joined a campaign to prevent illegal tree cutting taking place at the Salim Ali Bird Sanctuary, to pave way for road and metro constructions. During the movement, she stated - “I don't see any reason behind constructing road and metro from the sanctuary. The metro can be constructed underground and the road can be made elsewhere. Humans are not capable of making of what ‘Mother Earth’ can do. So we are just asking to stop the works and also stop cutting the trees.” She also consigned a letter to the Pune Municipal Corporation's Heritage Cell, to include the bird sanctuary in the list of national heritage sites.

She supports the Swachh Kalyani Nagar initiative in Pune, and had campaigned the households to process their waste effectively through segregation and recycling, ensuring minimum to zero garbage generation from individual societies.

== Personal life ==
On 7 September 2008, Mookhey got engaged to Prince Tuli, a New York-based businessman and financial consultant at a ceremony held at the Grand Maratha in Mumbai. The marriage was held on 2 November 2008 in a traditional Sikh ceremony at a Nagpur Gurudwara followed by a reception. They have one son together.

Her brother Kanwal Mookhey is a businessman and is married to Indian television actress Karishma Randhawa.

In July 2013, Mookhey accused her husband and in-laws of subjecting her to domestic violence and harassment, and a FIR was registered under Section 498A (cruelty and harassment) and Section 377 (unnatural sex) of the Indian Penal Code. In June 2014, the couple obtained a consensual divorce.

== Career ==
Mookhey entered the film industry in 2001 through the Tamil movie Poovellam Un Vasam, where she appeared in a song titled "Yukta Mookhey". She made her Hindi film debut with Pyaasa in 2002 starring with Aftab Shivdasani. The film proved to be a flop at the box office. Mookhey was cast in Market but had to drop out due to an injury. In 2003, she signed Kab Kyon Kahan and Hum Teeno, but both films where later shelved. She was later signed up for the 2004 release Insaaf: The Justice, but had to drop the project. In 2005, she acted in two films, Memsahab and Love in Japan. In 2006, she appeared in the music video for "Kathputali". In 2010, she acted in Odia film Swayamsiddha, where she played a Maoist named Swayamsiddha.

== Filmography ==
=== Films ===
Year	Title	Role	Notes	Ref.
2001	Poovellam Un Vasam	Herself	Tamil film; guest appearances	
2002	Ishq Na Karna Aya	Herself	Short film	
2002	Pyaasa	Sheetal		
2005	Dil Main Jaanam	Herself	Short film	
2006	Katputtli	Anju		
2006	Love in Japan	Herself	Guest appearance	
2007	Kab Kahaba Tu I Love You		Bhojpuri film	
2008	Memsahab	Anjali		
2010	Swayamsiddha	Shreya / Swayamsidha	Odia film	
2019	Good Newwz	IVF Center Patient		

=== Television ===
Year	Title	Role	Notes	Ref.
1999	Femina Miss India 1999	Herself / contestant		
1999	Miss World 1999	Herself / contestant / winner	International pageant	
2000	International Indian Film Awards 2000	Host	Award ceremony	
2000	Miss World 2000	Herself/ Reigning Miss World	International pageant	
2006	Jodi Kamaal Ki	Herself	Game show (participated with her father, Inderlal Mookhey)	

Awards and achievements
Preceded by (Israel) Linor Abargil	Miss World; 1999	Succeeded by (India) Priyanka Chopra
Preceded by (Malaysia) Lina Teoh	Miss World Asia & Oceania; 1999	Succeeded by (India) Priyanka Chopra
Preceded by Annie Thomas	Femina Miss India World; 1999	Succeeded by Priyanka Chopra
