= Martina Thorogood =

Venezuelan pageant titleholder (born 1975)

- Born: Martina Thorogood Heemsen; October 4, 1975 (age 51); Valencia, Carabobo, Venezuela
- Height: 1.76 m (5 ft 9 1/2 in)
- Beauty pageant titleholder
- Title: Miss Miranda 1999; Miss Venezuela 1999
- Hair color: Brown
- Eye color: Brown
- Major competitions: Miss Venezuela 1999 (Winner) (Miss Internet) (Miss Integral); Miss World 1999 (1st Runner-Up) (Miss World Americas)

Martina Thorogood Heemsen (born October 4, 1975 in Valencia) is a Venezuelan pageant titleholder who was crowned Miss Venezuela 1999 and represented her country at Miss World 1999.

== Pageant participation ==
=== Miss Venezuela 1999 ===
Thorogood competed in the national beauty pageant Miss Venezuela 1999 where she won the title. She also won the special awards of Miss Internet and Miss Integral. She represented the state of Miranda at the contest.

=== Miss World 1999 ===
Thorogood was the official representative of Venezuela to the Miss World 1999 pageant held in London, England, UK on December 4, 1999, where she finished as the 1st Runner-up to the eventual winner, Yukta Mookhey of India.

After competing in Miss World she was to compete in Miss Universe 2000 but her entry was denied by the Miss Universe Organization because she was the 1st runner-up in Miss World and there was a chance that she could assume the title should the winner resign or lose her crown.

Awards and achievements
Preceded by (France) Véronique Caloc	Miss World 1st Runner-Up; 1999	Succeeded by (Italy) Giorgia Palmas
Preceded by (Chile) Daniella Campos	Miss World Americas; 1999	Succeeded by (Uruguay) Katja Thomsen
Preceded by Veronica Schneider	Miss World Venezuela; 1999	Succeeded by Vanessa Cárdenas
Preceded by Carolina Indriago	Miss Venezuela; 1999	Succeeded by Eva Ekvall
Preceded by Bárbara Pérez	Miss Miranda; 1999	Succeeded by Susana de Fazio
