= Miss World 1999 =

International beauty pageant

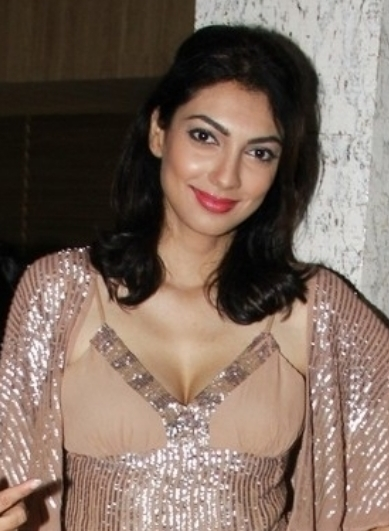
- Miss World 1999, Yukta Mookhey
- Date: 4 December 1999
- Presenters: Ulrika Jonsson; Melanie Sykes
- Venue: Olympia Hall, London, United Kingdom
- Broadcaster: E!; Channel 5
- Entrants: 94
- Placements: 10
- Debuts: Scotland; Wales
- Withdrawals: British Virgin Islands; Curaçao; Mauritius; Nicaragua; Taiwan
- Returns: Bangladesh; French Polynesia; Guyana; Honduras; Iceland; Kenya; Latvia; Madagascar; Romania; Sri Lanka; Thailand
- Winner: Yukta Mookhey; India

Miss World 1999, the 49th edition of the Miss World pageant, was held on 4 December 1999 at the Olympia Hall in London, United Kingdom. The pageant was hosted by Ulrika Jonsson and model Melanie Sykes. The 1999 pageant attracted 94 delegates from all over the world. The 1999 pageant also marked the first time that Scotland and Wales fielded their respective delegates.

At the end of the event, 20-year-old Miss India Yukta Mookhey went on to win the Miss World 1999 crown and she was crowned by her predecessor Linor Abargil of Israel. And it is the overall fourth victory of India in the pageant's history. Protesters gathered outside the event, decrying it as a "sexist cattle market". Initially set for Seychelles for the third time, the Miss World pageant was dropped due to the government's disinterest. Israel, the reigning Miss World's country, was considered, but security concerns arose. Negotiations with MGM Grand Las Vegas failed for undisclosed reasons. Ireland also rejected hosting due to high costs. Ultimately, organizers settled on London, United Kingdom, the pageant's origin since 1951, after failed attempts with Seychelles, Israel, United States, and Ireland. The preliminary competition was held in Malta.

== Selection of participants ==
=== Replacements ===
Alisa Sisic of Bosnia and Herzegovina was dethroned of her Miss Bosnia & Herzegovina 1999 crown due to her nude pictorials at Sarajevo Daily - Dnevni Avaz without her permission that made the organizers revoke her title.

Binibining Pilipinas International 1999, Lalaine Edson replaced Miriam Quiambao as Binibining Pilipinas World 1999, after Quiambao replaced Binibining Pilipinas Universe 1999 Janelle Bautista due to issues with her citizenship.

=== Debuts, returns, and withdrawals ===
This edition marked the debut of Scotland and Wales, and the return of Bangladesh, French Polynesia, Guyana, Honduras, Iceland, Kenya, Latvia, Madagascar, Romania, Sri Lanka and Thailand; Guyana, which last competed in 1989, Madagascar last competed in 1990, Iceland and Sri Lanka last competed in 1994, Bangladesh, French Polynesia (as Tahiti), Kenya, Romania, last competed in 1996 and Honduras, Latvia and Thailand last competed in 1997.

The British Virgin Islands, Curaçao, Mauritius, Nicaragua and Taiwan, withdrew from the competition.

== Results ==
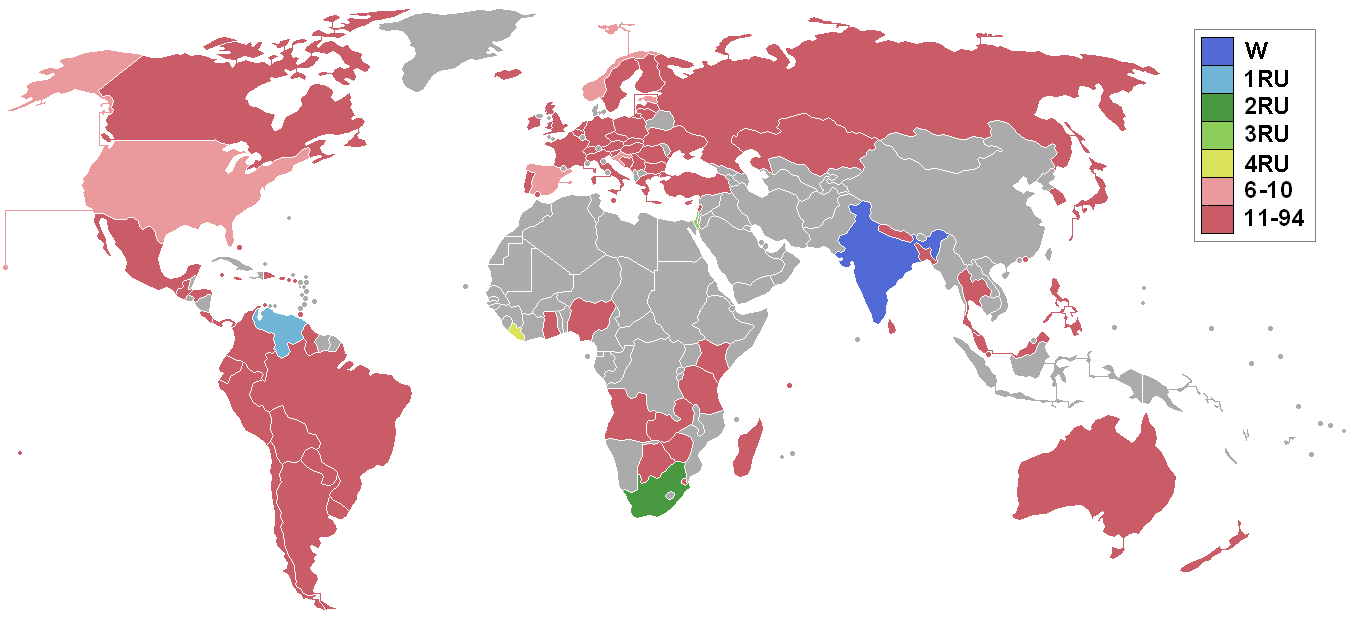
Countries and territories which sent delegates and results for Miss World 1999

=== Placements ===
Placement	Contestant
Miss World 1999	India – Yukta Mookhey
1st Runner-Up	Venezuela – Martina Thorogood
2nd Runner-Up	South Africa – Sonia Raciti
Top 5	Israel – Genny Chervoney; Liberia – Sebah Tubman
Top 10	Croatia – Ivana Petković; Estonia – Karin Laasmäe; Norway – Anette Haukaas; Spain – Lorena Bernal; United States – Natasha Allas

==== Continental Queens of Beauty ====
Continental Group	Contestant
Africa	South Africa – Sonia Raciti
Americas	Venezuela – Martina Thorogood
Asia & Oceania	India – Yukta Mookhey
Caribbean	Jamaica – Desiree Depass
Europe	Israel – Genny Chervoney

== Judges ==
- Eric Morley † – Chairman and CEO of Miss World Organization
- Louis Grech
- Luciana Gimenez
- Linda Pétursdóttir – Miss World 1988 from Iceland
- Dean Cain
- Eddie Irvine
- Terry O'Neill †
- Lennox Lewis
- Wilnelia Merced – Miss World 1975 from Puerto Rico

== Contestants ==
- Angola – Lorena Silva
- Argentina – Verónica Denise Barrionuevo
- Aruba – Cindy Vanessa Cam Tin Martinus
- Australia – Nalishebo Gaskell
- Austria – Sandra Kolbl
- Bahamas – Mary Watkins
- Bangladesh – Tania Rahman Tonni
- Belgium – Brigitta Callens
- Bolivia – Ana Raquel Rivera Zambrana
- Bosnia and Herzegovina – Samra Begović
- Botswana – Alimah Isaacs
- Brazil – Paula de Souza Carvalho
- Bulgaria – Violeta Zdravkova
- Canada – Mireille Eid
- Cayman Islands – Mona Lisa Tatum
- Chile – Lissette Sierra Ocayo
- Colombia – Mónica Elizabeth Escolar Danko
- Costa Rica – Fiorella Martínez
- Croatia – Ivana Petković
- Cyprus – Sofia Georgiou
- Czech Republic – Helena Houdová
- Dominican Republic – Luz Cecilia García Guzmán
- Ecuador – Sofía Morán Trueba
- Estonia – Karin Laasmäe
- Finland – Maria Laamanen
- France – Sandra Bretones
- French Polynesia (Note: Competed as Tahiti in the pageant) – Manoa Froge
- Germany – Susan Hoecke
- Ghana – Mariam Sugru Bugri
- Gibraltar – Abigail Garcia
- Greece – Evangelia Vatidou
- Guatemala – Ana Beatriz González Scheel
- Guyana – Indra Changa
- Holland – Ilona Marilyn van Veldhuisen
- Honduras – Irma Waleska Quijada Henríquez
- Hong Kong – Marsha Yuan Hu-Ma
- Hungary – Erika Dankai
- Iceland – Katrín Baldursdóttir
- India – Yukta Mookhey
- Ireland – Emir-Maria Holohan Doyle
- Israel – Jenny Chervoney
- Italy – Gloria Nicoletti
- Jamaica – Desiree Depass
- Japan – Aya Mitsubori
- Kazakhstan – Assel Issabayeva
- Kenya – Esther Muthoni Muthee
- Latvia – Evija Ručevska
- Lebanon – Norma Elias Naoum
- Liberia – Sebah Esther Tubman
- Lithuania – Renata Mackevičiūtė
- Madagascar – Tantely Naina Ramonjy
- Malaysia – Jaclyn Lee Tze Wey
- Malta – Catharine Attard
- Mexico – Danette Velasco Bataller
- Nepal – Shweta Singh
- New Zealand – Coralie Ann Warburton
- Nigeria – Augustine Iruviere
- Norway – Annette Haukaas
- Panama – Jessenia Casanova Reyes
- Paraguay – Mariela Candia Ramos
- Peru – Wendy Monteverde
- Philippines – Lalaine Bognot Edson
- Poland – Marta Kwiecień
- Portugal – Joana Ines Texeira
- Puerto Rico – Arlene Torres
- Romania – Nicoleta Luciu
- Russia – Elena Efimova
- Scotland – Stephanie Norrie
- Seychelles – Anne-Mary Jorre
- Singapore – Audrey Quek Ai Woon
- Sint Maarten (Note: competed as St. Maarten) – Ifelola Badejo
- Slovakia – Andrea Verešová
- Slovenia – Neda Gačnik
- South Africa – Sonia Raciti
- South Korea (Note: competed as Korea) – Han Na-na
- Spain – Lorena Bernal Pascual
- Sri Lanka – Dilumini de Alwis Jayasinghe
- Swaziland – Colleen Tullonen
- Sweden – Jenny Louise Torsvik
- Switzerland – Anita Buri
- Tanzania – Hoyce Anderson Temu
- Thailand – Kamala Khambhu na Ayudhya
- Trinidad and Tobago – Sacha Anton
- Turkey – Ayşe Hatun Önal
- Ukraine – Olga Savinskaya
- United Kingdom – Nicola Willoughby
- United States – Natasha Allas
- United States Virgin Islands (Note: competed as America Virgin Islands) – Shari Afua Smith
- Uruguay – Katherine Gonzalves
- Venezuela – Martina Thorogood Heemsen
- Wales – Clare Marie Daniels
- Yugoslavia – Lana Marić
- Zambia – Cynthia Chikwanda
- Zimbabwe – Brita Maseluthini

== Notes ==
=== Withdrawals ===
- Curaçao - Miss World Curaçao 1999, Dayanarah Roozendaal did not participate due to undisclosed reasons.
- Mauritius - Miss Mauritius 1999, Micaella L'Hortalle did not participate due to lack of sponsorship.

=== Did not compete ===
- Denmark - Miss Denmark 1999, Zahide Bayram did not participate due to undisclosed reasons.
- Namibia - Miss Namibia 1999, Vaanda Katjiuongua did not participate due to lack of sponsorship.
- Northern Ireland - Miss Northern Ireland 1999, Zöe Salmon withdrew at the last minute because the organizers couldn't apply for UK separate entry on time due to the Northern Ireland peace process.

=== Other notes ===
- Angola, Honduras, Japan, Madagascar, and Uruguay introduced themselves in their native languages.
- This is the first time that the contestants were introduced in evening gowns.
- England - Nicola Willoughby, still represented as United Kingdom in Miss World because of Northern Ireland's last-minute withdrawal.
