= Farrukh Ahmed Rehan =

Bangladeshi actor and model

- ফররুখ আহমেদ রেহান
- Born: 5 October; Tangail, Bangladesh
- Occupations: Actor; model
- Years active: 2019–present
- Website: farrukhrehan.com

Farrukh Ahmed Rehan (Note: also spelled as Forrukh Ahmed Rehan) is a Bangladeshi model and actor, works predominantly in Dhallywood cinema and Bangladeshi television drama. He made his debut in television drama Jugol (2024) and he won the Meril-Prothom Alo Awards for the television drama in the Best Debutante Actor category.

== Early life ==
Farrukh Ahmed Rehan was born on 5 October in Tangail. His father was a government employee. He studied at Bindu Basini Govt. Boys' High School and graduated from the University of Dhaka in 2017. However, as his family was middle-class, he could not study beyond the second year. In 2018, he took a job as a barista in North End, Dhaka, where he worked for a year.

== Career ==
Rehan's career began in 2019, when he worked as a model in various commercials. His work was halted in 2020 due to the COVID-19 pandemic. In 2024, he got the opportunity to act in the web series 'Ararat', directed by Vicky Zahed. His acting in the series, although short, was widely appreciated by the audience.

In 2024, Rehan made his debut in dramas, through 'Jugol', directed by Mizanur Rahman Aryan. For this work, he received the Meril-Prothom Alo Awards in the 'Best Newcomer' category in 2025. In 2025, he acted in the dramas 'Batase Premer Ghraan', with Tanjin Tisha and 'Shesh Theke Shuru', with Safa Kabir.

In 2025, Rehan starred in the web film 'Neel Sukh', where Mehazabien Chowdhury acted opposite him. His upcoming work includes a film, titled Andhar, directed by Raihan Rafi. In this film he plays the role of 'Himel'.

== Filmography ==
Key
†	Denotes films that have not yet been released

=== Films ===
Year	Title	Role	Notes	Ref.
2025	Neel Shukh	Maruf	Debut film; Released on Binge	
2025	Thursday Night	Rehan	Released on Chorki	
2026	O Jaan	Himself	Musical YouTube film	
2027	Andhar †	Himel	Debut feature film; scheduled for release on 26 March 2027	

=== Television ===
Year	Title	Role	Notes	Ref.
2024	Ararat	Jinn	Series on Binge	
2024	Jugol	Ahnaf	Television film	
2025	Batashe Premer Ghran	Rehan	Television film	
2025	Shesh Theke Shuru	Riaz Ahmed	Television film	

== Awards and nominations ==
Year	Award	Category	Works	Result	Ref.
2025	Meril-Prothom Alo Awards	Best Newcomer	Jugol	Won	
