= Jahid Nirob =

Bangladeshi composer

Jahid Nirob জাহিদ নিরব
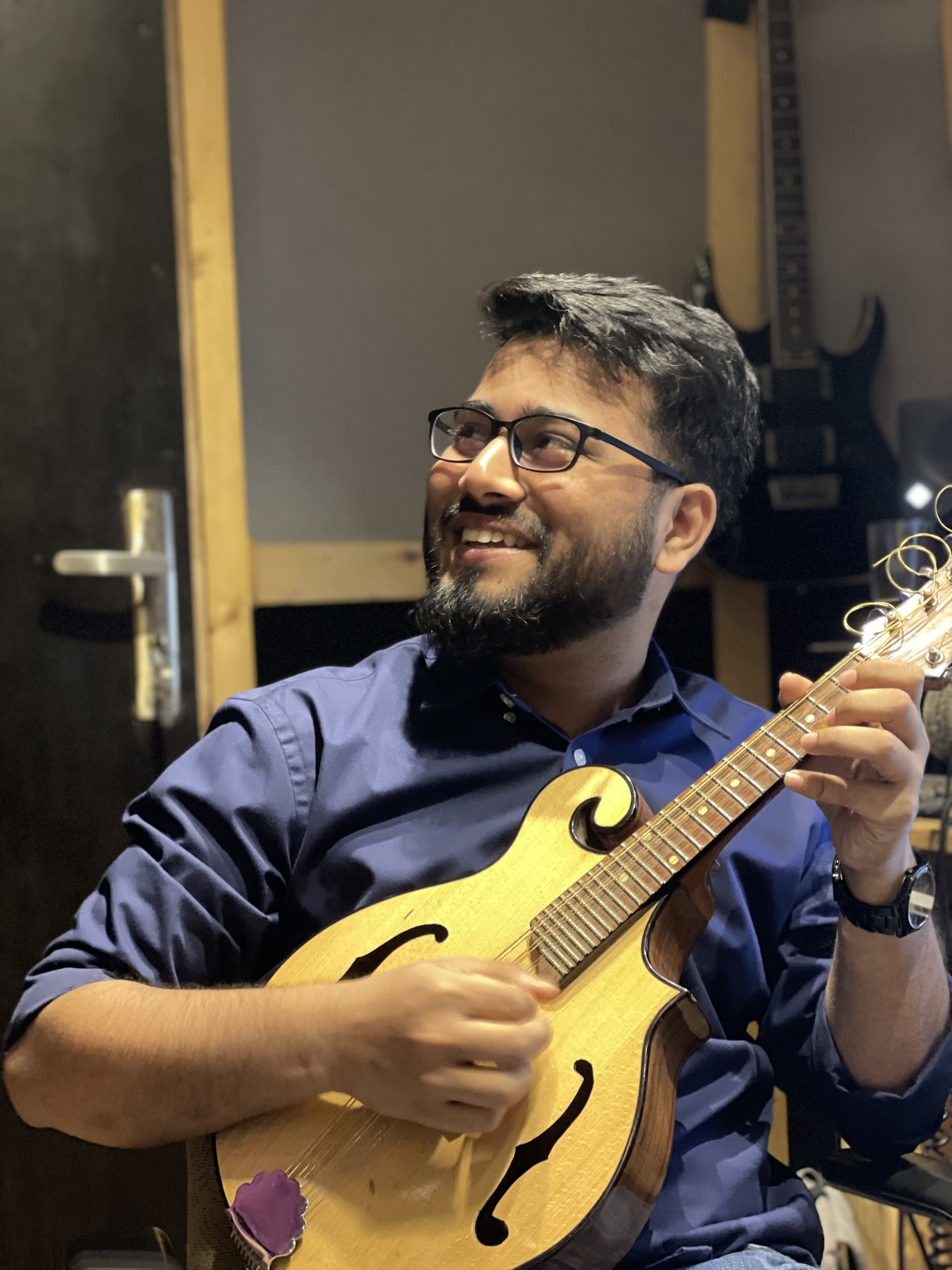
- Jahid nirob work on studio 2022

Background information
- Born: 21 October 1994 (age 32); Munshiganj District, Bangladesh
- Genres: Folk; Classical; Rock
- Occupations: Singer; Composer
- Instruments: Guitar; Keyboard; Harmonium; Singing
- Years active: 2015–present

Jahid Nirob (Bengali: জাহিদ নিরব) born 21 October 1994 is a Bangladeshi singer and composer best known as the member of the rock band Chirkutt. Nirob began his career when he participated in the contemporary reality show, Nescafe Get Set Rock in 2011, but gained widespread recognition after joining Chirkutt in 2015. In 2024, Nirob left Chirkutt after being with the band for around nine years to focus on his solo projects and other music-related work. He also composed "Borai Kore" for the 2026 film Pressure Cooker, sung by Ankan Kumar.

== Career ==
Playing harmonium with the song "Duniyaa" from the cinema Aynabaji was the commencing point of Jahid Nirob's journey to Chirkutt. Pavel Areen, the drummer & producer of Chirkutt band, was the pathfinder of Nirob's peregrination with Chirkutt. After joining Chirkutt, Jahid Nirob exuviated all of his existing work and started working with the band dedicatedly.

At the same time he started working as a music producer for butter communication, a highly equipped studio owned by Pavel Areen. And from that point of his career there was no looking back. He played his proficient role with Chirkutt in both national & international programs.

Jahid Nirob is attaining success in his solo career simultaneously. He is a musician in the advertising industry. He accomplished more than 400 background scores of TVC & OVC to date.

He composed the background score for several web series including Mohanagar by Ashfaque Nipun & Munshigiri by Amitabh Reza Chowdhury.

Several classic plays & short films are incorporated with his songs. Some noteworthy creations are "A Mon Tomar Mone" (2018), his first executed solo work, from the play "Premik 1982", "Prothom Upohar" from the same-titled play, "Kar Lagia" & "Tomake Chai" from Close-Up Kache Asar Golpo 2020 & 2021 respectively. The co-artist of the later one was Nazmun Munira Nancy.

The movie "Poddapuran" represents his inaugural venture as a music director within the Bangladeshi film industry. His second work,"Poran," has garnered immense popularity among Bengali-speaking audiences, and his third creation, "Deshantor," has carved a significant milestone in the realm of periodical music.

=== UNESCO Performance ===
In February 2025, Jahid Nirob directed the music for a cultural programme at UNESCO headquarters in Paris to mark the 25th anniversary of International Mother Language Day. The programme brought together Baul, folk and contemporary music. Performers included Islam Uddin Palakar, Parsha, rapper Shezan, Imrul Karim Emil of Shunno, Pinky of F Minor, Tuntun Fakir and flautist Jalal. A multilingual version of Amar Bhaiyer Rokte Rangano was also performed at the event.

=== Jahan-e-Khusrau Festival ===
In March 2026, Jahid Nirob led a Bangladeshi musical delegation that gave the opening performance at the Jahan-e-Khusrau Festival at Purana Qila in Delhi.

== Early life ==
Jahid Nirob was born on 21 October 1994 in Idrakpur, Munshiganj to Anower Hossain, a Renowned folk singer and Music Teacher and a homemaker mother. He began his music training at a very young age at home from his father.His maternal uncle Mujib Pardeshi is a famous folk singer and his grandfather used to play Flute. He studied at K K Govt. Institution, Munshiganj and later at the Government Haraganga College, Munshiganj.According to him, he "was a decent student, but cared more about music" and his parents decided to train him professionally. He was taught Indian classical music by his father and trained in tabla by Sharif Mahmud. At the age of thirteen, he learned the guitar and piano from Minhaz Babu.

Growing up, he listened to Bengali Folk music and, Bengali classical music. He idolized musicians like Ustad Mehdi Hasan, Manna Dey, Subir Nondi, and enjoyed listening to Kumar Bisswajit, Miles (band) And Bangladeshi Rock Bands.

== Discography ==
Background music

Year	Theatre Film	Director	Ref
2021	Poddapuran	Rashid Polash	
2022	Poran (film)	Raihan Rafi	
2022	Deshantor	Ashutosh Sujon	
2024	Moyurakkhi	Rashid Polash	
2025	Utshob	Tanim Noor	
2026	Bonolota Express	Tanim Noor	
2026	Rockstar	Azman Rusho	

Year	Web series	Director	Ref
2021	Mohanagar	Ashfaque Nipun	
2022	Sabrina	Ashfaque Nipun	
2023	Mohanagar 2	Ashfaque Nipun	
2023	Hotel Relax	Kajal Arefin Ome	
2023	Overtrump	Bashar Georges	

Year	Web Film	Director	Ref
2018	Biyer Dawat Roilo	Redoan Rony	
2018	Premik 1982	Muntasir Akib	
2018	Prothom Upohar	Mir Ishtiaq	
2019	The Phoenix	Apurbo Pal Arko	
2020	This is Our Place	Wahid Tareq	
2020	The Veil (পর্দা)	Kaiser Al Rabby	
2020	Oxygen	Raihan Rafi	
2021	Now Positive	Rakibul Hasan Reza	
2021	Now Positive	Rakibul Hasan Reza	
2021	The Dark Side Of Dhaka	Raihan Rafi	
2021	Munshigiri	Amitabh Reza Chowdhury	
2022	Taan (2022)	Raihan Rafi	
2022	Nishwas	Raihan Rafi	
2022	Daag	Sanjoy Samadder	
2022	Floor Number 7	Raihan Rafi	
2022	Shuklopokkho	Vicky Zahed	
2022	Tonoya	Imraul Rafat	
2022	Tithir Oshukh	Imraul Rafat	
2022	Aaral	Nazmul Nabin	
2022	Jahan	Atiq Zaman	
2023	Friday	Raihan Rafi	
2023	Bidesh	Kajal Arefin Ome	
2023	Punormilone	Mizanur Rahman Aryan	

Year	TV Drama	Director	Ref
2018	Pata Jhorar din	Redoan Rony	
2020	Tomar Kachei Jabo	Tanvir Ahsan	
2021	Othoba Premer Golpo	Raihan Rafi	

== Awards ==
Year	Nominated work	Category	Award	Result	Notes	Ref.
2024	Adhunik Bangla Hotel	Best Music Composer	Blender's Choice- The Daily Star OTT & Digital Content Awards	Won		
2025	Ghumpori	Best Music Composer	Blender's Choice- The Daily Star OTT & Digital Content Awards	Won		
