= Safa Kabir =

Bangladeshi actress

- সাফা কবির
- Kabir in 2026
- Born: Anatoney Kelly Safa; 29 August 1994 (age 32); Brahmanbaria, Bangladesh
- Other name: Anatoney Kelly
- Education: BAF Shaheen College Dhaka; American International University-Bangladesh
- Occupations: Model, actress
- Years active: 2013–present
- Parents: Humayun Kabir Sabuj (father); Jasmine Kabir (mother)

Anatoney Kelly (born 29 August 1994), known professionally as Safa Kabir is a Bangladeshi model and actress. She is notable for her works in television commercials, dramas and telefilms since 2013.

== Early life and education ==
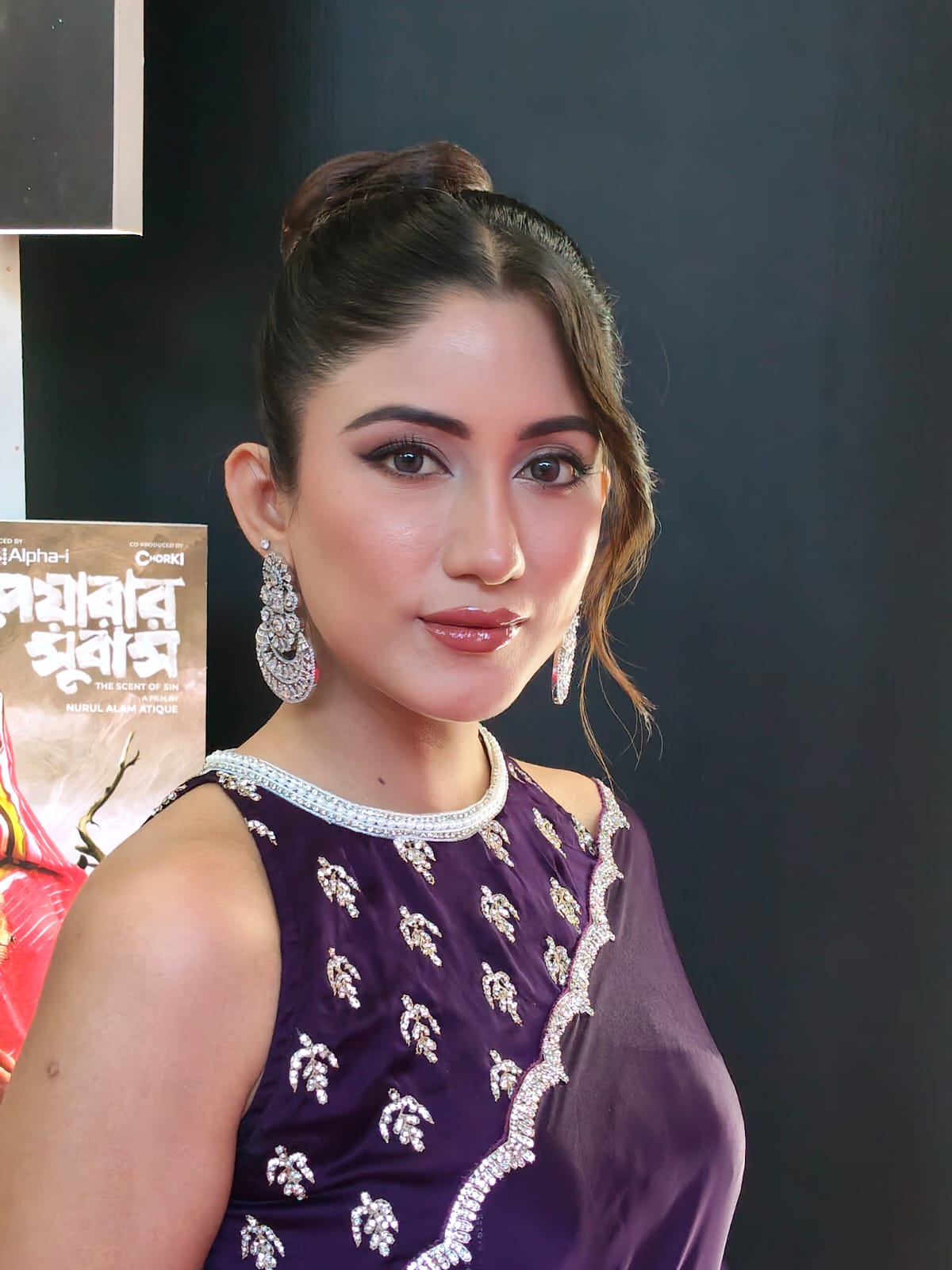
Safa Kabir, 2026

Safa Kabir was born in Brahmanbaria, Bangladesh. Although her birth name is Anatoney Kelly which was given by her grandfather in concept of his abroad living child's daughter should have a foreign-like name. She goes by the name Safa Kabir due to people mispronouncing and making fun of her name growing up.

She is an alumna of BAF Shaheen College Dhaka. She received her BBA degree from American International University-Bangladesh

== Career ==
Safa Kabir made her debut in the media world when she worked in a TVC of Airtel Bangladesh. Then she has worked in the TVCs of Pran Peanut Bar and Parachute Coconut Oil. After that, she has acted in multiple telefilms. Safa Kabir kicks off the journey in the media industry with a television commercial for Airtel Bangladesh directed by Ashfaq Bipul. She performs in several popular TVCs, including ‘Pran Peanut Bar’ and ‘Parachute Oil.' Safa hosted a program, ‘Style and Trend,' on NTV

== TV dramas and telefilms (selection) ==
Year	Drama / Telefilm Name	Director	Co Actor	Channel	Notes
2013	@18 All Time Dourer Upor	Adnan Al Rajeev	Mishu Sabbir, Tawsif Mahbub, Shabnam Faria, Zakia Bari Momo, Iresh Zaker, Allen Shuvro	G Series	
2014	Valobasa 101		Siam Ahmed, Mehazabien chowdhury Mumtahina toya, Mishu Sabbir, Salman Muqtadir, Sayem Sadat, Shoumik		
2015	Fera		Tawsif Mahbub		
2015	Na Manush		Farhan Ahmed Jovan, Tawsif Mahbub, Mishu Sabbir	Masranga TV channel	
2016	Ei Poth Jodi Na Shesh Hoi	Mahmudur Rahman Heme	Tahsan Rahman Khan	Gazi TV	
2016	Tomar Prithibi		Farhan Ahmed Jovan	TV Show HD YouTube channel	
2016	Rosh Chonmchom Shingara Fuchka		Afran Nisho, Tawsif Mahbub, Mumtaheena Toya		
2016	Bicycle Bhalobasha				
2016	Chemistry	Imraul Rafat	Tawsif Mahbub, Mishu Sabbir, Sabila Nur	Crush Entertainment YouTube Channel	
2016	Aj Jorir Biye	Meher Afroz Shawon	Tawsif Mahbub	Visual Playground YouTube channel	Written by: Humayun Ahmed
2017	Miss Match	Imraul Rafat	Jon Kabir	Lux Bangladesh YouTube Channel	Eid Drama
2017	Atopor Amra	Mabrur Rashid Bannah	Tawsif Mahbub, Allen Shuvro, Syed Zaman Shawon	Natokwala YouTube channel	
2017	Chakka	Md. Mostofa Kamal Raz	Mishu Sabbir, Allen Shubhro	Channel I TV channel	
2017	Millionaire From Barisal		Tawsif Mahbub	Maasranga TV channel	
2017	Obosheshe Amra	Mabrur Rashid Bannah	Farhan Ahmed Jovan	Maasranga TV channel	
2017	Tomay bhebe lekha	Imraul Rafat	Tahsan Rahman Khan, Nusrat Imrose Tisha	Daekho YouTube Channel	
2017	Shunte Pai	Niaz Nadvi	Badhon	Channel I	
2017	Milur Cycle	Tuhin Hossain	Tawsif Mahbub	RTV	
2017	Oviman		Dilara Zaman, Imad Wasek	Channel I	
2017	Tomake Astei Hobe		Tawsif Mahbub	Daekho YouTube channel	
2017	Satellite Man	Arif Rahman & Shorov Khan Pathan	Farhan Ahmed Jovan	RTV	
2017	Ke Tumi Oporajita		Sajal Noor	Boishakhi YouTube channel	
2017	Valentine's Gift	Prabir Ray	Farhan Ahmed Jovan	RTV	
2018	First Year Damn Care	Imraul Rafat	Farhan Ahmed Jovan	Gaanchill Drama & Cinema YouTube channel	
2018	A Driver	Mahmudur Rahman Heme	Tawsif Mahbub	Gazi TV	
2018	Bhai Kichu Bolte Chay	Mabrur Rashid Bannah	Afran Nisho, Mushfiq R. Farhan	Ozone Entertainment YouTube channel	
2018	Ochena Ratrir Ojana Gontobyo		A K Azad	Channel I	
2018	Kanamachi	Mijanur Rahman Pappu	Tawsif Mahbub	Dhruba TV	
2018	Soulmate	Rafat Mazumder Rinku	Tawsif Mahbub	CD Choice Drama YouTube channel	
	Eka Meye				
2018	Fahim The Great Fajil	Mehedi Hasan Hridoy	Tawsif Mahbub	Gollachut YouTube channel	
2018	Meyetar Cheleta	Mabrur Rashid Bannah	Ziaul Faruq Apurba	Ozone Entertainment Channel	
2018	Potaka	Qazi Saif Ahmed	Tawsif Mahbub	Dhruba TV	
2018	Tobuo Bhalobasi	Rubayet Mahmud	Siam Ahmed	Closeup Bangladesh	
2018	Tomar Apon Hater Dole	Shahriar Sumon	Farhan Ahmed Jovan	Gollachut YouTube channel	
2018	Tomar Jonno	Mahmudur Rahman Heme	Ziaul Faruq Apurba	CD Choice Drama YouTube channel	
2018	Tonima	Mabrur Rashid Bannah	Ziaul Faruq Apurba	Sarwar Tube YouTube channel	
2018	Uhh La La	Imraul Rafat	Tawsif Mahbub, Mumtaheena Toya	Dhruba TV	
2018	Vuter Valentine	Imraul Rafat	Afran Nisho, Tarek Anam Khan	RTV	
2018	Babar Juta	Tania Ahmed	Shahiduzzaman Selim Allen Shuvro	Channel I	Eid Ul Fitre natok
2018	Meghboron	Navil Ahmed Ovi	Tawsif Mahbub	Ozone Entertainment YouTube channel	
2018	Shei Choa	Imran Hawladar	Allen Shuvro	Channel I	
2018	Japte Thakuk Prem	Raisul Tomal	Irfan Sajjad	JMR Entertainment YouTube channel	
2018	Bithir Banan Vul Chilo	Mostafa Kamal Raj	Irfan Sajjad	NTV	Eid Natok
2018	Shukh	Mabrur Rashid Bannah	Yash Rohan	NTV	Eid Natok
2018	Aj Putuler Jonmodin	Md. Mostafa Kamal Raj	Afran Nisho	Rin Bangladesh YouTube channel	
2018	Kagojer Plane	Imraul Rafat	Farhan Ahmed Jovan	SA TV	Eid drama
2018	Passport	Kajal Arefin Ome	Tawsif Mahbub	Rongon Films YouTube channel	
2018	Cholo Prem Kori	S R Majumder	Tawsif Mahbub	Dhruba TV	
2018	Meyetar raag beshi	Mabrur Rashid Bannah	SN Jony	CD Choice Platinam YouTube Channel	
2018	Love Link	M. Shuvo	Tawsif Mahbub, Farahan Ahmed Jovan	CD Choice Platinam YouTube channel	
2019	Ei Golper Nam Nei	Anam Biswas	Syed Zaman Shawon	Closeup Bangladesh	
2019	Tumi Bolle	Mahmudur Rahman Heme	Ziaul Faruq Apurba	SevenTunes Entertainment	
2019	Meghla Meghla Din	Babu Siddiqui	Ziaul Faruq Apurba	Deepto TV	
2019	Obak Megher Bari	Ratan Hasan	Ziaul Faruq Apurba	Channel I	Eid drama
2019	Ghranush	S R Majumder	Farhan Ahmed Jovan	Soundtek Natok YouTube channel	
2019	Biye Kora Baron	Topu Khan	Tawsif Mahbub	Rongon Films YouTube channel	Eid drama
2019	Last Good-bye	Mehedi Hasan Jony	Tawsif Mahbub	Maasranga TV	Eid Telefilm
2019	Dream & Love	Maksudul Haque Emu	Yash Rohan	Live Tech YouTube Channel	
2019	Deal Done Kalachan	Topu Khan	Mosharraf Karim	Motion Rock Entertainment YouTube channel	
2019	Fahim The Great Fajil 2	Mehedi Hassan Hridoy	Tawsif Mahbub	Gollachut YouTube channel	
2019	Abeg Kumar	Rafat Mazumder Rinku	Tawsif Mahbub	JMR Entertainment YouTube channel	
2019	Bokul		Irfan Sajjad		
2019	Marriage Media / Ghotok Jokhon Crush	S R Mazumder	Tawsif Mahbub	Suranjali Prime YouTube channel	
2019	Kabul	Topu Khan	Tahsan Khan	Rongon Films	
2019	Choya	Md. Mehedi Hasan Jony	Tawsif Mahbub	Natok Buzz YouTube channel	
2019	Food Delivery Man	Atif Aslam Bablu	Irfan Sajjad	Housefull Entertainment YouTube channel	
2019	50% Discount	Hasib Hossain Rakhi	Tawsif Mahbub	CD Choice Drama	
2019	The Life of Jalil	Vicky Zahed	Afran Nisho	Dhruba TV	Eid drama
2019	Didha	Shahriar Sumon	Tawsif Mahbub	Gollachut Entertainment YouTube channel	
2019	Bhalobashar Hat Dhore	Jakiul Islam Ripon	Tawsif Mahbub	RTV	Telefilm
2019	Sopno O Bhalobashar Golpo	Imraul Rafat	Manoj Pramanik	RTV	
2019	Preme Pora Baron	Topu Khan	Tawsif Mahbub	Rongon Films YouTube channel	
2019	Generation Story	Kajal Arefin Ome	Tawsif Mahbub		
2019	Cholo Palai	Imraul Rafat	Mishu Sabbir, Syed Zaman Shawon	Rongon Films YouTube channel	
2019	Tumi Valo Theko		Tawsif Mahbub		
2019	Good Boy Bad Girl	Mehedi Hasan Hridoy	Tawsif Mahbub	CD Choice Drama YouTube channel	
2019	Fried Rice	Rafat Mazumder Rinku	Tawsif Mahbub		
2019	Rajkumari	Anjan Aich	Tawsif Mahbub	RTV	
2019	Check In To Love	Zakiul Islam Ripon	Tawsif Mahbub	RTV	
2019	Lover boy	Imraul Rafat	Tawsif Mahbub	Gaanchil Drama & Cinema YouTube channel	
2019	Vul Manush	Shakhwat Manik	Tawsif Mahbub	G Series Bangla Natok YouTube channel	
2019	My Friend's Girl	Asif Iqbal Jewel	Tawsif Mahbub, Tamim Mridha	Rosogolla YouTube channel	
2019	After Break	Mansur Alam Nirjhor	Irfan Sajjad	D Drama Dhamaka	
2019	Shironam Nei	Monsur Alam Nirjhor	Irfan Sajjad	D Drama Dhamaka	
2019	Kata Kuti	Khayrul Papon	Tawsif Mahbub	NTV	
2019	Mission Barisal	Kajal Arefin Ome	Tawsif Mahbub	Live Tech YouTube channel	
2019	Girlfriend er Bap	Mehedi Hassan Hridoy	Farhan Ahmed Jovan	Gollachut YouTube channel	
2019	Leather er Jacket	Fazlul Selim	Farhan Ahmed Jovan	NTV	
2019	Baby Rasel	Rafat Mazumder Rinku	Tawsif Mahbub	D Drama Dhamaka YouTube channel	
2019	Eta Mitthe Kono Golpo Noi	Md. Mehedi Hasan Jony	Ziaul Faruq Apurba	Jago Entertainment	
2019	Dhakaiya Ashik	Mohammad Mitfah Anan	Tawsif Mahbub	RTV	
2020	Fighter	Sojib Mahmud	Tawsif Mahub	Live Tech YouTube channel	
2020	Bibaho Dot Com	Tuhin Hossain	Tawsif Mahbub	ATN Bangla	
2020	Heartless	Swaraj Deb	Tawsif Mahbub	HIA Entertainment YouTube channel	
2020	Veg Nonveg	Bishwajit Dutta	Tawsif Mahbub	RTV	Eid Ul Adha drama
2020	Password	Topu Khan	Farhan Ahmed Jovan	Motion Rock Entertainment YouTube channel	
2020	Drama Queen	Mohammad Mitfah Anan	Tawsif Mahbub	Eagle Premier Station YouTube channel	
2020	Promotion	Rubel Hassan	Ziaul Faruq Apurba	CD Choice Drama YouTube channel	
2020	Faw Girl	Osman Miraz	Tawsif Mahbub	Eagle Premier Station YouTube channel	
2020	Baby Apur Live	Julfikar Alam Shishir	Farhan Ahmed Jovan	G Series Bangla Natok YouTube channel	
2020	Prank Couple	MI Jewel	Tawsif Mahbub	CD Vision Drama YouTube channel	
2020	Victim	Ashfaque Nipun	Afran Nisho, Aupee Karim	Live Tech YouTube channel	
2020	A Bitter Love Story	Mabrur Rashid Bannah	Tahsan Rahman Khan	Club 11 Entertainment YouTube channel	
2020	Newly Married	Imraul Rafat	Tawsif Mahbub	CD Choice Drama YouTube channel	
2020	Gift Girl	Osman Miraz	Tawsif Mahbub	Eagle Premier Station YouTube channel	
2020	Cha Patha	Rafat Mazumder Rinku	Tawsif Mahbub	Eagle Premier Station YouTube channel	
2020	Nawab Is Back	Rafat Mazumder Rinku	Tawsif Mahbub	RTV	
2020	Show Maker	Khairul Papon	Afran Nisho	Dhrubo TV	Eid Drama
2020	Perfect One	Ponir Khan	Ziaul Faruq Apurba	Channel I Prime YouTube channel	
2020	Take Care	Rubel Hasan	Ziaul Faruq Apurba	Motion Rock Entertainment YouTube channel	
2020	Recent Prem	Anisur Rahman Rajib	Tawsif Mahbub	Motion Rock Entertainment	
2020	Makeup Girl	Osman Miraz	Tawsif Mahbub	Eagle Premier Station	
2020	Oloukik Bibaho Jatra	Iftekhar Shuvo	Farhan Ahmed Jovan	Channel I	
2020	Kuheli	L R Sohel	Tawsif Mahbub	Visual Scene Entertainment	Valentine Drama
2020	Choto Poribar Aboshyok	Julfikar Islam Shishir & Atif Aslam Bablu	Tawsif Mahbub	Ozone Entertainment YouTube channel	Boishakh Drama
2020	Love & Friendship	Asif Iqbal Jewel	Farhan Ahmed Jovan	CD Choice Drama YouTube channel	Valentine Drama
2020	Dhuloghor	S K Shuvo	Irfan Sajjad	Housefull Entertainment YouTube channel	
2020	Amar Chawala	Md Mehedi Hasan Jony	Tawsif Mahbub	CD Choice Drama YouTube channel	
2020	Sobuj Ronger Sopno	Shakhaot Shibli	Sajal	ATN Bangla	
2020	Last Rain	Mohammad Mitfah Anaan	Tawsif Mahbub	Soundtek YouTube channel	
2020	Half Truth	Imraul Rafat	Tawsif Mahbub	Global Television	
2020	Apni Ki Hotashay Bhugchen?	Mehedi Hassan Hridoy	Tawsif Mahbub	Eagle Premier Station YouTube channel	
2020	Dim Vaji	Raisul Tomal	Irfan Sajjad	RTV	Valentine Day Drama
2020	Plus Minus	Mursalin Shuvo	Tawsif Mahbub	SevenTunes Entertainment YouTube channel	
2020	Meera	Mahmudur Rahman Heme	Tawsif Mahbub	GSeries Natok YouTube channel	
2020	Sheshta Sobai Jane	Nuhash Humayun	Junaid Bughdadi	Closeup Bangladesh	Closeup Kache Asar Osomapto Golpo
2020	Majhe Majhe Tomay Bhebe	Anjon Aich	Manoj Pramanik	RTV Drama	
2020	Dream and Love	Maksudul Haque Emu	Yash Rohan	Live Tech YouTube channel	
2020	Pain	Imraul Rafat	Tawsif Mahbub	CD Choice Drama YouTube channel	
2020	Tumi Ami Ar Didha	Sagar Jahan	Ziaul Faruq Apurba	Ganer Dali Drama YouTube channel	Story: A. A. Hasan
2020	Honesty Is The Best Policy	Mohammad Mostafa Kalam Raz	Ziaul Faruq Apurba	Gollachut YouTube channel	Concept: Ziaul Faruq Apurba
2020	Prothom Valobasha	Hasib Khan	Tawsif Mahbub	D Dhamaka Drama YouTube channel	Script: Shetu Arif
2020	Hamiloner Gaanwala	Habibur Rahman Habib	Tawsif Mahbub	Channel I	
2020	Gof	Rafat Mazumder Rinku	Tawsif Mahbub	RTV	
2020	Oh! My Darling	Rafat Mazumder Rinku	Tawsif Mahbub	Eagle Premier Station YouTube channel	Eid Drama
2020	Devil	Mehedi Hassan Hridoy	Tawsif Mahbub	Live Tech YouTube channel	
2020	Tahader Bhalobasha	Vicky Zahed	Tawsif Mahbub	Gollachut YouTube channel	
2020	Ichcha	Pritty Dutta	Tawsif Mahbub	RTV	Durga Puja Special Drama
2020	Ami Tomake Bole Dibo	Tuhin Hossain	Tawsif Mahbub	RTV	Eid Drama
2021	Nabik	Mohon Ahmed	Tawsif Mahbub	Sultan Entertainment YouTube channel	
2021	Life Game	Fahriyan Chowdhury Tonmoy	Tawsif Mahbub	GSeries YouTube channel	Eid Drama
2021	Kemon Achen Dulabhai	Nazmul Rony	Tawsif Mahbub	GSeries YouTube channel	Script: Saifur Rahman Kajal
2021	Lover's Food Van	Vicky Zahed	Tawsif Mahbub	Brikkho Films YouTube channel	
2021	Valobasa 101	Redoan Rony	Siam Ahmed, Mehazabien Chowdhury, Mumtaheena Toya	GSeries YouTube channel	
2021	Sada	Mehedi Hassan Hridoy	Tawsif Mahbub	Dhallywood Motion YouTube Channel	
2021	Moner Moto Bagan	Mahmudur Rahman Hime	Tawsif Mahbub	Eagle Premier Station YouTube channel	
2021	Rafiar Dingulo	Dipu Hazra	Tawsif Mahbub	Ganer Dali YouTube Channel	
2021	Thana Theke Aschi	Alok Hasan	Farhan Ahmed Jovan	NTV	
2021	Lockdown Prem	Raisul Tomal	Farhan Ahmed Jovan	RTV	Eid Drama
2021	Chorom Behaya	Muhammad Miftah Anaan	Tawsif Mahbub	Eagle Premier Station YouTube channel	
2021	Mia Bibi Raji	Jakaria Shawkhin	Tawsif Mahbub	Eagle Premier Station YouTube channel	
2021	Rajneeti	Sajid Khan	Tawsif Mahbub	GSeries Bangla Natok YouTube Channel	
2021	Truth Or Dare	Imraul Rafat	Tawsif Mahbub	Deadline Entertainment YouTube Channel	Eid Drama
2021	No Way Out	Iftekhar Ahmed Fahmi	Farhan Ahmed Jovan	Rangon YouTube Channel	
2021	Lobh	Rafat Mazumder Rinku	Tawsif Mahbub	Eagle Premier Station YouTube channel	
2021	Baby Girl	Mohammad Miftah Anaan	Tawsif Mahbub	RTV	Eid Drama
2021	Viral Virus	Goutam Kouri	Yash Rohan	NTV	
2021	Check Check Prem	Abdullah Akash	Tawsif Mahbub	NTV	
2021	Dhakaiya Wedding	Mohammad Miftah Anaan	Tawsif Mahbub	RTV	Eid Drama
2021	Dhakaiya Khandan	Muhammad Miftah Anaan	Tawsif Mahbub	RTV	Eid Drama
2021	Saat Sotero	Toufiqul Islam	Tawsif Mahbub	CMV YouTube Channel	
2021	Fapor	Shahid Un Nabi	Farhan Ahmed Jovan	Bongo	
2021	Toke Bhalobasi Ami	Nazmul Roni	Ziaul Faruq Apurba	My sound drama YouTube channel	
2021	Bifole Mulyo Ferot	Rafat Mazumder Rinku	Tawsif Mahbub	Eagle Premier Station YouTube channel	
2021	Chilie Sauce	Imraul Rafat	Syed Zaman Shawon	Global Tv online YouTube channel	
2021	Eti Forhad	Golam Muktadir	Tawsif Mahbub	Visual Playground YouTube channel	
2021	Tufan	Salim Akand	Tawsif Mahbub	CD vision YouTube channel	
2021	Bofriender Biye		Syed Zaman Shawon		
2021	Chilekothar Bhalobasa		Rishi Koushik		
2021	Kono Somosya?		Tawsif Mahbub		
2021	Third Chance		Tawsif Mahbub		
2021	Reverse		Tawsif Mahbub		
2021	Prescription		Junaid Bughdadi		
2021	More Than a Friend		Tawsif Mahbub		
2021	Obosheshe Brishty		Farhan Ahmed Jovan		
2021	Mejaj Kharap		Tawsif Mahbub		
2021	Shesh Khela		Tawsif Mahbub, Fazlur Rahman Babu		
2021	Sondhya Namte Deri	Ponir Khan	Farhan Ahmed Jovan		Script by Maruf Hossain Sajib
2021	Ei Poth Jodi Na Shesh Hoi	Mahmudur Rahman Hime	Tahsan Rahman Khan		
2021	Contract Bhai		Iresh Zaker		
2021	Baby Apur Live 2		Syed Zaman Shawon		
2021	Pagol Premik		Syed Zaman Shawon		
2021	Patla Khan Lane E Bagh Ashiachilo	Abdullah Al Muktadir, Fahad Khan	Intekhab Dinar		
2021	Fulsojja	Nazmul Roni	Syed Zaman Shawon		
2021	Hoyto Tomar Jonyo		Tawsif Mahbub		
2021	Durghotona Kobolito Shami		Irfan Sajjad		
2021	Charulota	Md. Taufiqul Islam	Mosharraf Karim	Sarker Media YouTube channel	Valentines Special
2021	Tumi Arekti Din Thako	Vicky Zahed	Khairul Basar		
2021	Je Chilo Amar		Tawsif Mahbub		
2021	1990 A Love Story		Tawsif Mahbub		
2021	Hello Ladies	Muhammad Miftah Anaan	Tawsif Mahbub		
2021	Pa		Tawsif Mahbub		
2021	Chirokal	Mizanur Rahman Aryan	Tawsif Mahbub		
2021	Hawai Mithai		Tawsif Mahbub		
2021	Middle Class Love	Imraul Rafat	Farhan Ahmed Jovan		
2022	Hot Temper	Shihab Shaheen	Afran Nisho		
2022	Blind Spot		Tawsif Mahbub		
2022	Amar Ki Dosh	Serniabat Shawon	Khairul Basar		
2022	Middle Class Love Story	Nazmul Hasan	Shamol Mawla	Bashundhara digital	
2022	Nayan Tarar Golpogatha	Abul Hayat Mahmud	Khairul Basar		
2022	Chirkut O Nil Saree	Maruf Hossain Sajib	Khairul Basar		
2022	Prem 2022		Yash Rohan		
2022	Miss Shiuly	Ashfaque Nipun	Afran Nisho, Aupee Karim, Yash Rohan		
2022	Tobuo Rekho Mone		Tahsan Rahman Khan		
2022	Japani Bow		Niloy Alamgir		
2022	E Dekha Nai Ba Hoto		Manoj Pramanik		
2022	Station	Tareq Rahman	Khairul Bashar		
2022	Time Pass		Tawsif Mahbub		
2022	Arrange Marriage		Irfan Sajjad		
2022	Trap		Irfan Sajjad		
2022	Relationship Manager		Syed Zaman Shawon	Dipto tv	
2022	Filmy Prem	Raisul Tomal	Farhan Ahmed Jovan		
2022	Pashe Thakar Golpo	Mizanur Rahman Aryan	Syed Zaman Shawon		
2022	Bhalobeshe Jai	Rakesh Basu	Farhan Ahmed Jovan, Azizul Hakim, Rosy Siddique		
2022	Shesh Bikel		Farhan Ahmed Jovan		
2022	Love Drive	Mabrur Rashid Bannah	Farhan Ahmed Jovan		
2022	24 Ghonta	Tuhin Hossain	Farhan Ahmed Jovan		
2022	Angti		Tawsif Mahbub		
2022	Touch	Mahmudur Rahman Hime	Farhan Ahmed Jovan		Story by Safa Kabir
2022	Protibeshini	Preety Dutta	Yash Rohan		
2022	Golden Goal	Topu Khan	Farhan Ahmed Jovan		
2022	Fagun Theke Fagune	Amitabh Reza Chowdhury	Sudip Biswas Dip		Nominated for Meril Prothom Alo Award 2022
2022	Bad Buzz		Parsa Evana, Mishu Sabbir, Ziaul Haque Polash		
2022	Khubi Good Hocche	Iftekhar Ahmed Fahmi	Syed Zaman Shawon	RTV	
2022	Good Buzz		Parsa Evana, Mishu Sabbir, Ziaul Haque Polash		
2022	Bongsher Batti		Tawsif Mahbub		
2022	Hello Listeners		Pritom Hasan		
2022	Arekbar Bhalobasi		Tahsan Rahman Khan		
2022	Chorui Jora		Tawsif Mahbub		
2022	Yearmate		Farhan Ahmed Jovan		
2022	Pichla		Tawsif Mahbub		
2022	Re-Cycle Bin	Rakesh Basu	Rishi Koushik		
2023	Boba Bhalobasha		Mishu Sabbir, Yash Rohan		
2023	Hisabi Bou		Ziaul Faruq Apurba		
2023	Cafeteria		Ziaul Faruq Apurba		
2023	Ek Akasher Chad		Farhan Ahmed Jovan		
2023	Odekha		Shamol Mawla		
2023	Mithya Bola Baron		Ziaul Faruq Apurba		
2023	Dear Wife		Farhan Ahmed Jovan		
2023	Oversmart		Ziaul Faruq Apurba		
2023	Sukher Ayojone		Ziaul Faruq Apurba		
2023	Golmal Villa		Ziaul Faruq Apurba		
2023	Rat Pakhir Dak		Tawsif Mahbub, SN Jony		
2023	Shudhu Tomar Jonno		Tawsif Mahbub		
2023	Ek Oshukhe Dujon Ondho	Pulak Anil	Khairul Basar		
2023	Ora Tinjon	Mizanur Rahman Aryan	Khairul Basar, Tashnuva Tisha		
2023	Dui Bodhu Ek Shami	Shakhawat Manik	Tawsif Mahbub, Nabila Islam		Script by: Rajib Ahmed
2023	Chorer Master	Vicky Zahed	Khairul Basar	Bongo	Eid Drama
2023	Amader Prem Kahini		Tawsif Mahbub		
2023	Rongin Kagoj		Farhan Ahmed Jovan		
2023	Amader Modhye Prem Chilo	Imraul Rafat	Syed Zaman Shawon		
2023	Odrishyo Bhalobasha		Sajal		
2023	Katakuti Khela	Manab Mitra	Manoj Pramanik		
2023	Kothay		Ziaul Haque Polash, Emon		
2023	Joto Durei	Mizanur Rahman Aryan	Tawsif Mahbub		
2023	Neelar Chithi	M Hasnat Shantu	Irfan Sajjad		
2023	Ebhabei Bhalobasha Hoi	Hasan Rezaul	Farhan Ahmed Jovan		
2023	Opurnota	Mahmudur Rahman Hime	Tawsif Mahbub, Fazlur Rahman Babu		
2023	Robin Bhai	Mursalin Shuvo	Ziaul Faruq Apurba		
2023	Ekjon Bhalo Manush		Farhan Ahmed Jovan		
2023	Kacher Manush	B. U. Shuvo	Ziaul Faruq Apurba		
2023	Chawalir Prem		Farhan Ahmed Jovan		
2023	Hotath Shrabon		Farhan Ahmed Jovan		
2023	Kiptush Couple		Farhan Ahmed Jovan		
2024	Goodbye	Shahid-Un-Nabi	Farhan Ahmed Jovan		
2024	Ononto bhalobasa	Maruf Hossain Sojib	Farhan Ahmed Jovan	Suronjoli YouTube channel	
2024	Ontoto Kotha Hok	Salim Reza	Khairul Basar		
2024	Prothom Prem	Miftah Anaan	Niloy Alamgir		
2024	Agontuk	Ashfaque Nipun	Afran Nisho, Yash Rohan		
2024	Hrid Majhare		Niloy Alamgir		
2024	Toofan		Niloy Alamgir		
2024	Adharer Ful	Pothik Shadhan	Farhan Ahmed Jovan		
2024	Let's Be Together		Tawsif Mahbub		
2024	Bolo Tare	Chayanika Chowdhury	Farhan Ahmed Jovan		
2024	Khoborer Feriwala		Yash Rohan		
2024	Sukh Oshukher Golpo		Partha Sheikh		
2024	Golpota Samanyoi	Rubel Anush	Khairul Basar		
2024	Jadur Shohor		Farhan Ahmed Jovan		
2024	Bhalobashar Koyekti Din		Ziaul Faruq Apurba		
2024	Chokher Joler Rong	Taufiqul Islam	Khairul Basar		
2024	Vanishing Man		Ziaul Haque Polash		
2024	Jhilmil		Tawsif Mahbub		
2024	Nogor Projapoti	Rubel Anush	Khairul Basar		
2024	Megher Danay Tui		Syed Zaman Shawon, Abul Hayat, Dolly Zohur		
2024	Afsos	Serniabat Shawon	Khairul Basar		
2024	Fida	Rubel Anush	Mushfiq R. Farhan		
2024	Love Buzz		Ziaul Haque Polash		
2024	Feel My Love		Tawsif Mahbub		
2024	Bikal Belar Chad		Farhan Ahmed Jovan		
2024	Tor Jonno		Tawsif Mahbub		
2024	Bed No. 3	Vicky Zahed	Tawsif Mahbub		Received award for Best Actress
2024	Dom	Rubel Anush	Mushfiq R. Farhan		
2024	Ektu Adhtu Prem	Maruf Hossain Sajib	Khairul Basar		
2024	Happy Man		Tawsif Mahbub		
2024	Sheshta Hok Alingone	Bappy Khan	Irfan Sajjad		
2024	Charukabyo	Preety Dutta	Khairul Basar		
2024	Private Car		Tawsif Mahbub		
2024	Tomay Agle Thaki		Tawsif Mahbub		
2024	Parul		Manoj Pramanik		
2024	Bhalobasha Ononto		Junaid Bughdadi		
2024	Wada		Niloy Alamgir		
2024	Mon Janala	Serniabat Shawon	Khairul Basar	HIA Entertainment	2025 Eid Ul Adha Drama
2024	Ononto Prem	Mohidul Mohim	Farhan Ahmed Jovan		
2024	100 Bigha Ful Bagan	Serniabat Shawon	Khairul Basar		
2024	Dure Kothay	Tarek Reza Sarkar	Khairul Basar		
2024	Bak Bakum	Md. Toufiqul Islam	Ziaul Faruq Apurba		
2024	Jotno	Mizanur Rahman Aryan	Khairul Basar	IScreen app	Not available on YouTube
2024	Super Wife	Taufiqul Islam	Mushfiq R. Farhan		Received BIFA Awards for Best TV Drama Actress (Popular)
2024	Jonmo		Sohel Mondol	Ganer Dali YouTube channel	
2024	Screen Er Arale		Khairul Basar	https://www.safetyforher.net/	UNDP natok
2024	E Tumi Kemon Tumi	Alok Hasan	Junaid Bugdadi	Channel I Prime YouTube channel	
2025	Protiddhoni	Sikder Diamond	Sudip Biswas Dip	Bongo app	
2025	Hepa		Mushfiq R. Farhan	G Series on YouTube channel	Valentine drama
2025	Tomar sathei shuru	Serniabat Shawon	Khairul Basar	Rangon Entertainment YouTube channel	Valentine drama
2025	Ami shudhu tomar hobo	Mesbah Uddin Sumon / Md. Toufiqul Islam	Mushfiq R. Farhan	Sultan Entertainment YouTube channel	Valentine drama post Eid-ul-Fitre
2025	Tumi		Tawsif Mahbub	Masranga TV channel and Masranga YouTube channel	Eid-Ul-Adha drama
2025	Kana machi	Rubel Anush	Mushfiq R. Farhan	Club11 Entertainment YouTube channel	Eid-Ul-Fitre drama
2025	Howcow	A K Parag	Mushfiq R. Farhan	Masranga tv channel, CMV YouTube channel	Eid-Ul-Fitre drama
2025	Laily Mojnur biye	Muhammad Miftah Annan	Niloy Alamgir	Niloy Alamgir Films YouTube channel	Eid-Ul-Fitre drama
2025	Safia	Jamal Mollick	Sahel Mondol	Deepto tv channel, Deepto natok YouTube channel	Eid-Ul-Fitre drama Written by Anupam Das
2025	Mayer Doa	Mabrur Rashid Bannah	Farhan Ahmed Jovan	Gazi TV and GTV Drama YouTube channel	Eid-Ul-Fitre drama
2025	Biye Tiye	Md. Miftah Annan	Niloy Alamgir	360 Drama YouTube channel	Eid-Ul-Fitre drama
2025	Jodi amar hou	Serniabat Shawon	Khairul Basar	Rangon Entertainment YouTube channel	Valentine drama post Eid-Ul-Fitre drama
2025	Mood Swings	Mabrur Rashid Bannah	Mushfiq R. Farhan	Club 11 Entertainment YouTube channel	Eid-Ul-Adha Drama
2025	Shesh theke Shuru	Written by Rubel Anush Eahsan Alahi Bappy	Farrukh Ahmed Rehan	ntv Natok YouTube channel	Post Eid-Ul-Adha drama
2025	Jodi Kintu tobuo	Shohid Un Nabi	Farhan Ahmed Jovan	RTV drama	Eid-Ul-Adha drama
2025	Keno ei songota	Ashikur Rahman	Ziaul Haque Polash, Dilara Zaman	Kahini YouTube channel	Eid-Ul-Adha drama
2025	Sondhi	Kabir Ahmed	Khairul Basar	Kahini YouTube channel	Eid-Ul-Adha drama
2025	Cup of coffee	Shohid Un Nabi	Farhan Ahmed Jovan	Gazi TV & Gazi TV YouTube channel	Eid-Ul-Adha drama
2025	Fair in Love	Mabrur Rashid Bannah	Mushfiq R. Farhan		Eid Ul Adha drama
2025	Olpo Solpo Premer Golpo	Zubair Ibn Bakar	Khairul Basar	LBC Entertainment YouTube channel	Eid Ul Adha drama
2025	Jaan Amar	Md Miftah Anaan	Niloy Alamgir	Niloy Alamgir Films YouTube channel	Eid Ul Adha drama
2025	Check Mate	Toufiqul Islam	Mushfiq R. Farhan		Drama
2025	paglu	Salman Rahman Khan	Mosharraf Karim	G Series YouTube channel	
2025	Lelin	Subroto Sanjib	Mushfiq R. Farhan	G Series YouTube channel	Drama
2026	Mothso Konya	Serniabat Shawon	Khairul Basar	Rangon Entertainment YouTube channel	Drama
2026	Purnota	Serniabat Shawon	Khairul Basar		Upcoming Eid Drama
2026	Based on True Story	Mahmud Mahin	Mushfiq R. Farhan	Masranga Television	Eid Drama
2026	Foria	Subroto Sonjib	Khairul Basar	Masranga Television	Eid Drama
2026	Hat Dhorechi Urbo Bole	Serniabat Shawon	Khairul Basar	Hia Entertainment YouTube channel	Eid Drama
2026	Jotishir Biye	Ahsan Habib Akik	Mosharraf Karim	RTV Channel, RTV Drama YouTube channel	Eid Ul Adha Drama
2026	Tor Name Ridoy	Mohidul Mohim	Mushfiq R. Farhan	Capital Drama YouTube Channel	Eid Ul Adha Drama
2026	Pothe Pothe Bhalobasha		Khairul Basar	RTV	Eid Ul Adha Drama
2026	Warish	Imraul Rafat	Tawsif Mahbub, Yash Rohan	CMV YouTube channel	Eid Ul Adha Drama
2026	Upo Songsar	Ashikur Rahman	Ziaul Haque Polash	Club 11 Entertainment YouTube channel	Eid Drama
2026	Darling harbour	Shahid Un Nabi	Tawsif Mahbub	Bangla Vision YouTube channel	
2026	Ar Kichukkhon	Sazzad Hossain Bappy	Khairul Basar	Bangla Vision TV channel, YouTube channel	
2026	Fire Asar Golpo	B U Shuvro	Mushfiq R. Farhan	G Series YouTube channel	
2026	Comment Sense	Sheikh Nazmul Huda Emon	Ziaul Haque Polash	Boom films YouTube channel	
2026	Amader Songsar	B U Shuvro	Mushfiq R. Farhan	Sarker Media YouTube channel	September 2026
2026	Mone Rekho Noori	Ehsan Elahi Bappy	Syed Zaman Shawon	NTV Natok	October 2026
2026	Obak bhalobasha		Mushfiq R. Farhan	Danguli YouTube channel	
2026	Somporker Odrishshyo Setu	Anisur Rahman Rajib	Shashwta Datta	Priyonti Entertainment YouTube channel	October 2026

== Advertisement ==
- Gaye Holud (2015) - Closeup Bangladesh
- Danish (2025)

== Filmography ==
Year	Film	Role	Co-Actor	Notes	Ref.
2022	Nishwas	Sumaiya		Released on Chorki	
2025	Khalid		Ziaul Haque Palash	Club 11 Entertainment YouTube channel	
2026	Cha Gorom		Partha Sheikh	Chorki	

== Short films ==
- Deyal
- Bandhobi
- Kanamachi
- Okkhor

== Music videos ==
- Amar Kache Tumi Onnorokom (Singer : Imran Mahmudul)
- Emon Ekta Tumi Chai (Singer: Imran Mahmudul)
- Mitthe Golpobaz (Singer: Setu Chowdhury)
- Khoka (Singer : Ferdous Wahid)
- Jabe ki chole (Singer: Topu & Anila)
- Emon Keno Korcho (Singer: Milon)
- Kotha Dilam (Singer: Ehsan Rahi)
- Tomake Chuye Dibo (Singer: Imran & Kona)
- Shortohin Valobasha (Singer: Milon)
- Daiko Na Bhaiya (Singer: Syed Nafis & Shubro Raha)
- Shopnogulo Pahara (Singer: Nahiyan)
- Bojhe Na Bou - OST (Singer: G.M. Ashraf & Subhro Raha)
- Horsho (Singer: Sabbir Nasir)

== Radio program ==
- Love Struck By Safa Kabir (ABC Radio)

== Host ==
- Teer Little Chef
- One Question Go
- Bhalobashar Shei Shad Cooking Show sponsored by Pran Gura Mosolla

== Web series ==
Year	Title	OTT	Director	Co Actor	Notes
2017	Bagh Bondi		Vicky Zahed	Farhan Ahmed Jovan, Tawsif Mahbub	
2018	Ushner Attohotta		Vicky Zahed	Tawsif Mahbub	
2019	Gone Case	Bongo BD	Anam Biswas	Yash Rohan	
2021	Boli	Hoichoi	Shankha Dasgupta Rabiul Alam Robi		
2023	Kuhelika	Binge	Samiur Rahman	Yash Rohan	
2024	Tikit	Chorki	Vicky Zahed	Siam Ahmed	

TV Series: Candy Crush, 3 Sisters, University, Chelemanushi, Jadoo Villa, Super Girls
