= Nazia Haque Orsha =

Bangladeshi actress and model

- নাজিয়া হক অর্ষা
- Born: 21 May
- Citizenship: Bangladeshi
- Education: Bangladesh Home Economics College
- Years active: 2009–present
- Spouses: Mostafizur Noor Imran (m. 2024)
- Parents: Enamul Haque (father); Masuda Haque (mother)

Nazia Haque Orsha (born 21 May) is a Bangladeshi actress and model.

== Background ==
Orsha has two younger sisters, Priya and Chadni. She was born in Mirpur, Dhaka. She was a participant in 2009 beauty contest Lux Chanel I Super Star. She got the 4th position. She has acted in more than 100 TV dramas. She also has acted in several films and telefilms.

== Personal life ==
On 14 January 2024, Orsha and actor Mostafizur Noor Imran revealed that their wedding was held three months prior.

== Film ==
- Ferari Manush
- Prarthona
- Raian
- Adharer Oboshan
- Orpita
- 1971: Sei Shob Din
- Ditiyo Koishor
- Networker Baire
- Kuhelika (2023)

Year	Film	Role	Notes	Ref.
2023	Ora 7 Jon	Aporazita	Won – Bangladesh National Film Awards for Best Supporting Actor	

== Telefilms ==
- Sonchalok
- Unfit
- Ekti Raater Golpo
- Mr. Handsome (2018)
- Ajo Sei Tumi(2020)
- Mr.K (2021)

== TV serial ==
- Vadro Para
- Saatkahon (2017)
- Chandful Omabasya (চাঁদফুল অমাবস্যা)
- Ekantoee Tumi (একান্তই তুমি)
- Priyo (প্রিয়)
- Ful Mohol (2017)
- Khayesh
- Khushbu

== Web series ==
Year	Title	Character	OTT	Co-Artist	Director	Notes
2020	Boomerang	Anonnya	Binge	Adnan Faruque Hillol	Wahid Tarek	
2020	Send Me Nudes			Abir Mirza, Sarika Sabah	Majidul Islam Shadin	
2020	Hares	Pori	Binge	Iftekhar Ahmed Fahmi	Wasim Sitar	
2020	Sundori			Aparna Ghosh, Irene Afroze, FS Nayeem, Mostafizur Noor Imran	Siddique Ahmed	
2021	Bou Diaries (Bon Appetit)		Bioscope	Rawnak Hasan	Sameer Ahmed	
2022	Sabrina	Sabrina	Hoichoi	Mehazabien Chowdhury	Ashfaque Nipun	

== TV drama ==
Title	Playwright & Director	Co-stars	Notes
Aye Bhore (2016)	Shimanto Sajal	Sajal, Kayes Chowdhury and Sujat Shimul	
Choto Kaku		Afzal Hossain	Serial
Jibon Churi		Nayeem	
Cactuse Chapa Koshto		Nayeem	
Arshir Khola Chithi		Nayeem, Apurba, Faria	
Special Gift		Apurba	
Nidritai Nirobe		Apurba	
Ontohin Opekkha	Mesbah Shikdar	Apurba	
Noyone bari Jhore		Apurba	
Bondhu Valobashi		Nisho & Nadia	
Dure Aro Dure	Chayanika Chowdhury	Apurba	
Unfit		Iresh, Apurba, Tanjin	
Icche Tuku Tomar	Proggya Niharika	Shajal	
Buk Poketer Golpo		Apurba	
Prishta No. 132		Milon	
Red Envelope		Milon	
Sharat Babu		Joney	
Moddhobortini	B U Shuvo	Joney, Orin	
Apon Por		Shajal	
Obekto Bhaloasha		Shajal	
Pashe Thakai Kache Thaka Noy		Shajal	
Prem Kora Nished		Nayeem	
Obelar Tithi		Shajal, Lamia	
Criss Cross		Shajal	
Tomar Chokhe Amar Sorbonash		Shajal	
Pother Porichoy		Shajal	
Goti		Nayeem	
Aaj o Tumi Ar Aami		Milon	
Ek Hridoyhina		Apurba	
Tumi Ami She	Mizanur Rahman Aryan	Arifin Shuvoo	
Druho		Shajal	
Fire Jabo Na		Zahid Hasan	
Otohpor Ja Holo		Shajal	
Ghorka Murgi Dal Borabor		Shajal	
Priyotomo Bhalobasa		Milon	
Sokal Belar Roddur			
Paparazzi			
Kono Obhijog Nei			
Humayun Shomipe			
Opare Digonto			
Mister Handsome			
Vor Dumur			
Bishpan Korbo nah			
Rath Jagania			
Kajol Bhromora Re			
Shantipurite Oshanti			
Ghore Fera			
Criket Counter			
Khujechi Tomay			
Chor	Morshed Himadri	Manoj Pramanik	
Laili Moznu			
Umpire			
Bor Pokkho			
Divorcee Bou			
Crazy Husband			
Oddrissho Tan		Shamol Mawla	
Moddho Rate Meyeti			
Over Trumph			
Sarat Babu			
