= Lutfur Rahman George =

Bangladeshi actor

- লুৎফর রহমান জর্জ
- Born: Lutfur Rahman George; 1 July 1963 (age 63); Kaliganj Upazila, Jhenaidah, Jhenaidah District
- Occupation: Actor
- Years active: 1993–present
- Notable work: Aguner Poroshmoni, Aynabaji, Voyonkor Sundor, Mohanagar

Lutfur Rahman George (born 1 July 1963) is a Bangladeshi television and film actor. He has worked in films like Aguner Poroshmoni and Aynabaji. He is currently the organizational editor of Actors’ Equity Bangladesh. In 2023 he performed in Priyotoma, which is the highest grossing Bangladesh film of all time.

== Career ==
Lutfur started his acting career in theatre in 1985, working with the renowned company, Nagorik Natya Sampradaya. He went on to essay the role of Mojnu, in Humayun Ahmed's hit television series, Kothao Keu Nei. He then starred in Aguner Poroshmoni (1994) directed by Humayun Ahmed and Pokamakorer Ghorbosoti (1996). Then he concentrated on business away from acting for 14 years. After that he returned to acting after recovering from a heart attack. His role in Mostofa Sarwar Farooki's TV drama 420 was also highly praised. In 2023, he performed as an antagonist in Himel Ashraf's tragic romance Priyotoma, co-starring Shakib Khan, which became the highest grossing Bangladeshi film of all time.

== Filmography ==
- Aguner Poroshmoni (1994)
- Pokamakorer Ghorbosoti (1996)
- Bailey Road (2011)
- Mrittika Maya (2013)
- Aynabaji (2016)
- Gohin Baluchor (2017)
- Voyonkor Sundor (2017)
- Kaler Putul (2018)
- Iti, Tomari Dhaka (2019)
- Indubala (2019)
- Poran (2022)
- Radio (2023)
- Priyotoma (2023)
- Dard/Dorod (2024)
- A House Named Shahana (2025)

== Television ==
=== TV series ===
- Kothao Keu Nei
- 420
- Hawai Mithai
- Atmoj (Attoj)
- Kaal Nitur Biye
- Buker Bam Pashe
- Mashrafe Junior
- Zindabahar (2022)

=== Telefilm ===
| Year | Title | Director | Notes |
|---|---|---|---|
| 2021 | Chorer Master | Vicky Zahed | Bongo BOB Telefilm; Based on the novel of Chorer Master Computer Engineer by Rahitul Islam |

== Web series ==
| Year | Title | OTT | Character | Director | Notes |
|---|---|---|---|---|---|
| 2021 | Money Honey | Hoichoi | | Tanim Noor and Krishnendu Chattopadhyay | |
| 2021 | Bilaap | cinematic | | Sunny Sanwar and Faisal Ahmed | |
| 2021 | Mohanagar | Hoichoi | Alamgir Kabir | Ashfaque Nipun | |
| 2021 | Boli | Hoichoi | Selim | Shankha Dasgupta | |
| 2021 | Jaago Bahey | Chorki | Boss | Siddiq Ahmed | |
