= Thursday Night =

2025 Bangladeshi mystery thriller film

- Poster
- Directed by: Jahid Preetom
- Written by: Jahid Preetom
- Produced by: Shahriar Shakil
- Starring: Tangia Zaman Methila; Samira Khan Mahi; Farrukh Ahmed Rehan; Shoumya Joyti
- Production company: Alpha-i
- Distributed by: Chorki
- Release date: 27 November 2025
- Running time: 47 Minutes
- Country: Bangladesh
- Language: Bengali

Thursday Night is a 2025 Bangladeshi mystery thriller film. It is Chorki's original film or flash fiction, directed by Jahid Preetom and produced by Shahriar Shakil under the banner of Alpha-i. The film stars Tangia Zaman Methila, Samira Khan Mahi, Farrukh Ahmed Rehan and Shoumya Joyti.

The film was released on 27 November 2025 on Chorki.

== Premise ==
Her final university party ended in a twelve-hour blackout. Waking up in her room with a terrifying blank, Mithila is convinced something horrific occurred—and now, trapped by her own fractured memory, she trusts absolutely no one.

— Chorki

== Cast ==
- Tangia Zaman Methila as Mithila
- Samira Khan Mahi as Sharmin
- Farrukh Ahmed Rehan as Rehan
- Shoumya Joyti as Emon
- Tauhidul Tamil as Tamil
- Parvez Shumon
- Mehedi Hasan Medha
- Sadid Adnan Wahid
- Rehnuma Alam Oishee
