= Golpogulo Amader =

Bengali drama series

- Bengali: গল্পগুলো আমাদের
- Genre: Romance; Drama
- Screenplay by: Aboyob Siddique Medi
- Story by: Mizanur Rahman Aryan
- Directed by: Mizanur Rahman Aryan
- Starring: Syed Hasan Imam; Dilara Zaman; Ziaul Faruq Apurba; Tasnuva Tisha
- Theme music composer: Sajid Sarkar
- Country of origin: Bangladesh
- Original language: Bengali
- No. of episodes: 57

Production
- Producer: Irfan Ullah
- Cinematography: Kamrul Islam Shuvo
- Animators: Studio Tik Tok; Sayem
- Editors: Toufiqul Islam; Mohammad Imtiaz
- Running time: 20-22 minutes
- Production companies: Drik Production House; NTV

Original release
- Network: NTV
- Release: 8 December 2017 – 29 June 2018

Golpogulo Amader (transl. The stories of us) is a Bangladeshi Bengali language television drama series that premiered on NTV on 8 December 2017 and ended on 29 June 2018 completing 57 episodes. Two episodes were aired each Thursday and Friday in a week. It is the first television series directed by Mizanur Rahman Aryan.

== Plot ==
The plot of the drama serial is about stories of love and separation. An elderly couple Akbar and Ayesha running a restaurant. Most of the customers are couples in the restaurant. They always notice the relationship and live between each couple in the restaurant. They try to fix relationships which are broken.

== Cast ==
- Syed Hasan Imam as Akbar
- Dilara Zaman as Ayesha
- Ziaul Faruq Apurba
- Tasnuva Tisha
- Intekhab Dinar
- Nadia Afrin Mim
- Anando Khaled
- Tawsif Mahbub
- Farhan Ahmed Jovan
- Allen Shuvro
- Sabnam Faria
- Sallha Khanam Nadia
- Safa Kabir
- Iffat Tarash
- Sayra
- Rimi Karim
- Khalequzzaman
- Mili Bashar
- Shelly Ahsan
- Maznun Mizan
- Tamim Mridha
- Soumik
- Abir Mirza
- Sudip
- Pranil
- RJ Sabbir

== Music ==
"Golpogulo Amader (Title track)"

Song by Minar Rahman
- Length: 4:06
- Composer: Sajid Sarkar
- Lyricist: Minar Rahman

The title track of the series is written and sung by Minar Rahman and theme music is composed by Sajid Sarkar.

== See also ==
- Porer Meye
