= Mohanagar (Bangladeshi TV series) =

Bangladeshi drama streaming television series

- Also known as: The Metropolis
- Bengali: মহানগর
- Genre: Drama
- Created by: Ashfaque Nipun
- Starring: Mostafizur Noor Imran; Mosharraf Karim; Shamol Mawla; Nishat Priom; Brindaban Das; Khairul Basar; Nasir Uddin Khan; Zakia Bari Mamo; Shahed Ali; Lutfur Rahman George
- Composer: Jahid Nirob
- Country of origin: Bangladesh
- Original language: Bengali
- No. of seasons: 2
- No. of episodes: 17

Production
- Executive producer: Parvez Amin
- Production location: Bangladesh
- Cinematography: Sheikh Rajibul Islam
- Editor: HM Sohel
- Running time: 20–30 minutes
- Production company: Shopno Ghuri Communication

Original release
- Network: Hoichoi
- Release: 25 June 2021 – 20 April 2023

Mohanagar (Bengali: মহানগর) is a Bangladeshi streaming television drama series created by Ashfaque Nipun. It stars Mosharraf Karim as the officer in charge (OC) of Kotwali police station, Dhaka. The series consisting of eight episodes premiered on 25 June 2021 on Hoichoi. Khairul Basar, Shamol Mawla, Nishat Priom, Mostafizur Noor Imran, Nasir Uddin Khan, Zakia Bari Momo, and Shahed Ali co-starred. In March 2023, the series was renewed for a second season Mohanagar 2, which was released on 20 April 2023.

== Premise ==
Sub-inspector Moloy Kumar (Mostafizur Noor Imran) got a tip from one of his trusted informers that a wanted criminal returned to the capital. He went on the hunt for this criminal with his superior officer in charge Harun (Mosharraf Karim) in the middle of the night. In the meantime, police arrested Afnan Chowdhury (Shamol Mawla), the son of an influential businessman and politician accused of a hit and run case. Afnan's Father sent his counselor (Shahed Ali) to the police station and told him to negotiate with his old friend OC Harun to bring Afnan out of this mess. But things got tougher when AC Shahana Huda (Zakia Bari Mamo) came to the scene. She started trying to spoil OC Harun's attempt of saving Afnan.

== Cast ==
- Mosharraf Karim as OC Harun Ur Rashid
- Shamol Mawla as Afnan Chowdhury
- Quazi Nawshaba Ahmed as Afnan Chowdhury's wife (special appearance in season 2)
- Ariana Zaman as Zara

=== Season 1 ===
- Nishat Priom as Rumana Malik
- Khairul Basar as Abir Hasan
- Lutfur Rahman George as Alamgir Kabir
- Nasir Uddin Khan as Mugger Kaisar
- Zakia Bari Mamo as Shahana Huda
- Shahed Ali as Amzad Khan
- Jibon Ray as the eye-witness
- Rishad Mahmud as police

=== Season 2 ===
- Fazlur Rahman Babu as Intelligence Officer Babar
- Afsana Mimi as Mayor Rasheda Khanam
- Anirban Bhattacharya as MP Rajab Ali (cameo)
- Brindaban Das as DB Officer Sukumar Barua
- Dibyo Jyoti as Masum
- Tanzika Amin as Mitu
- Sarkar Rawnak Ripon
- Joy Raj as journalist

== Episodes ==
Season	Episodes	Originally released	
Season	Episodes	First released	Last released
1	8	June 25, 2021	June 25, 2021
2	9	April 20, 2023	April 20, 2023

=== Season 1 (2021) ===
No. overall	Episode	Directed by	Written by	Original release date
1	Ishaner Megh	Ashfaque Nipun	Ashfaque Nipun	25 June 2021
2	Chiching Faank	Ashfaque Nipun	Ashfaque Nipun	25 June 2021
3	Shape Bor	Ashfaque Nipun	Ashfaque Nipun	25 June 2021
4	Golar Kaanta	Ashfaque Nipun	Ashfaque Nipun	25 June 2021
5	Amabashyar Chand	Ashfaque Nipun	Ashfaque Nipun	25 June 2021
6	Andher Joshthi	Ashfaque Nipun	Ashfaque Nipun	25 June 2021
7	Goray Golod	Ashfaque Nipun	Ashfaque Nipun	25 June 2021
8	Kistimat	Ashfaque Nipun	Ashfaque Nipun	25 June 2021

=== Season 2 (2023) ===
No. overall	Episode	Directed by	Written by	Original release date
1	Keche Gondush	Ashfaque Nipun	Ashfaque Nipun	20 April 2023
2	Gokuler Shaar	Ashfaque Nipun	Ashfaque Nipun	20 April 2023
3	Dumurer Phool	Ashfaque Nipun	Ashfaque Nipun	20 April 2023
4	Goru Khoja	Ashfaque Nipun	Ashfaque Nipun	20 April 2023
5	Koto Dhane Koto Chaal	Ashfaque Nipun	Ashfaque Nipun	20 April 2023
6	Shankher Korat	Ashfaque Nipun	Ashfaque Nipun	20 April 2023
7	Damadol	Ashfaque Nipun	Ashfaque Nipun	20 April 2023
8	Poa Baro	Ashfaque Nipun	Ashfaque Nipun	20 April 2023
9	Bina Meghe Bojropaat	Ashfaque Nipun	Ashfaque Nipun	20 April 2023

== Release ==
On 19 Jun 2021, the official trailer for the series was released on Hoichoi's YouTube channel. All the episodes of season 1 was released on June 25, 2021. Season 2 was released 2 years later on Hoichoi on 20 April 2023. The series received wide response from the audience. Hoichoi made the entire first season of its series "Mohanagar" available for free viewing starting on 30 August 2024.

== Awards ==
Award Title	Category	Awardee	Result	Ref
Meril-Prothom Alo Awards	Best Director (web series)	Ashfaque Nipun	Won	
Hoichoi Awards	Star of the Year	Mosharraf Karim	Won	
Hoichoi Awards	Best Supporting Actor Female (Bangladesh)	Zakia Bari Momo	Won	
Hoichoi Awards	Best Supporting Actor Male (Bangladesh)	Shamol Mawla and Nasir Uddin Khan	Won	
Hoichoi Awards	Most Watched Series (Bangladesh)		Won	
Hoichoi Awards	Best Director of the Year (Bangladesh)	Ashfaque Nipun	Won	
Channel i Digital Media Awards	Best director (web series)	Ashfaque Nipun	Won	
Blender's Choice–The Daily Star Awards	Best Director, Series (popular category)	Ashfaque Nipun	Won	
Blender's Choice–The Daily Star Awards	Best Male Actor (critics' choice category)	Mosharraf Karim	Won	
Blender's Choice–The Daily Star Awards	Best Cinematography	Sheikh Rajibul Islam	Won	

Mohanagar 2

Year	Award	Category	Results
2024	Meril-Prothom Alo Award 2023	Best web series in 2023	Won

== See also ==
- Unoloukik
- Taqdeer
- Robindronath Ekhane Kawkhono Khete Aashenni
- Ladies & Gentleman
- August 14
