= Boro Chele =

Bangladeshi tele film

- Genre: Family-drama
- Created by: Mizanur Rahman Aryan
- Written by: Mizanur Rahman Aryan
- Directed by: Mizanur Rahman Aryan
- Starring: Ziaul Faruq Apurba; Mehazabien Chowdhury; Khalekuzzaman; Sheli Ahsan
- Music by: Sajid Sarkar
- Country of origin: Bangladesh
- Original language: Bengali

Production
- Cinematography: Kamrul Islam Shuvra
- Editors: Tawfiqul Islam; Mohammad Imtiaz; Tuhin Rukh Khan; Shuvro Mamun
- Running time: 60 minutes
- Production companies: Drik; CD Choice

Original release
- Release: September 2017

Boro Chele is a 2017 Bangladeshi telefilm written and directed by Mizanur Rahman Aryan. It features Ziaul Faruq Apurba and Mehazabien Chowdhury in lead roles. The telefilm premiered on Channel 9 on the occasion on Eid al-Adha. It marks as the most viewed Bangladeshi telefilm on YouTube.

== Cast ==
- Ziaul Faruq Apurba as Rashed
- Mehazabien Chowdhury as Riya
- Khalequzzaman as Rashed's father
- Shelly Ahsan as Rashed's mother
- Golam Rabbani Mintu
- Shanta Rahman
- Shamim
- Bashar Bappy
- Bappa Russell
- Saifur Rahman Chowdhury
- Bijoy
- Irfaan as Rony, Rashed's youngest brother
- Anisha as Jenny, Rashed's niece

== Soundtrack ==
The telefilm soundtrack was composed by Sajid Sarkar. The telefilm used only a song titled Tai Tomar Kheyal sung by Miftah Zaman and lyrics written by Shomeshwar Oli.
