= Neel Shukh =

- Poster
- Directed by: Vicky Zahed
- Written by: Vicky Zahed
- Produced by: Umme Khairun Islam
- Starring: Farrukh Ahmed Rehan; Mehazabien Chowdhury; Golam Farida Chhonda; Reshma Ahmed
- Cinematography: Sumon Hossain
- Edited by: Aurnob Hasnat
- Music by: Shahriar Marcell
- Production company: Binge
- Distributed by: Binge
- Release date: 18 February 2025
- Country: Bangladesh
- Language: Bengali

Neel Shukh is a 2025 Bangladeshi psychological romance film script and directed by Vicky Zahed and produced by Umme Khairun Islam with the production company of Binge. It stars Farrukh Ahmed Rehan and Mehazabien Chowdhury in the lead roles.

== Cast ==
- Farrukh Ahmed Rehan as Maruf
- Mehazabien Chowdhury as Arpa
- Golam Farida Chhonda
- Reshma Ahmed
- Mukul Siraj
- Ashok Bepari
- Momena Chowdhury
- Dipta Dey
- Ferdousi Tanvir Ichchha

== Release ==
The film released on 18 February 2025 on OTT platform Binge.

== Reception ==
=== Critical response ===
Pritha Parmita Nag of Prothom Alo praised as an evocative romantic drama that departs from the director's typical dark thrillers and commended Mehazabien Chowdhury's compelling lead performance for anchoring the film's complex narrative of love, grief, and revenge, alongside its nostalgic 1990s aesthetic, cinematic homages, and a surprising climax.

Rajib Chowdhury of Bondhushava Prothom Alo praised for its emotional depth and unique visual style, highlighting Mehazabien Chowdhury's compelling lead performance in portraying grief, romance, and psychological complexity and commended its nostalgic tone, evocative soundtrack, and well-executed narrative twists.

Maruf Emon of Bangla Movie Database rating 6 out of 10 and highlighted for its emotional narrative, with praise directed at Mehazabien Chowdhury's lead performance and the film's visual presentation. While commending its psychological depth and nostalgic homage to 1990s cinema, the review noted that certain elements of the plot and pacing felt conventional.

== Accolades ==
Year	Award	Category	Recipient	Result	Ref.
2026	Blender's Choice-The Daily Star OTT & Digital Content Awards	Best Actress	Mehazabien Chowdhury	Won	
