= Utshob =

- Global release poster
- Directed by: Tanim Noor
- Written by: Tanim Noor; Ayman Asib Shadhin; Susmoy Sarkar; Samiul Bhuiyan
- Story by: Original Story: Charles Dickens; Adapted Story: Tanim Noor; Ayman Asib Shadhin; Susmoy Sarkar; Samiul Bhuiyan
- Based on: A Christmas Carol by Charles Dickens
- Produced by: Tanim Noor
- Starring: Zahid Hasan; Afsana Mimi; Chanchal Chowdhury; Jaya Ahsan; Aupee Karim; Tariq Anam Khan; Azad Abul Kalam; Intekhab Dinar; Sunerah Binte Kamal; Shoumya Joyti; Sadia Ayman
- Cinematography: Rashed Zaman
- Edited by: Saleh Sobhan Auneem
- Music by: Jahid Nirob
- Production company: Dope Productions
- Distributed by: Chorki
- Release date: June 7, 2025
- Running time: 112 minutes
- Country: Bangladesh
- Language: Bangla
- Budget: est. ৳2 crore
- Box office: est. ৳13 crore

Utshob (Bengali: উৎসব, transl. Festival) is a 2025 Bangladeshi comedy drama film directed and produced by Tanim Noor under the banner of Dope Productions, with Chorki and Laughing Elephant serving as co-producers. The story of the film was inspired by A Christmas Carol authored by Charles Dickens. The film features an ensemble cast that includes Zahid Hasan, Afsana Mimi, Chanchal Chowdhury, Jaya Ahsan, Aupee Karim, Tariq Anam Khan, Azad Abul Kalam, Intekhab Dinar, Sunerah Binte Kamal, Shoumya Joyti, and Sadia Ayman.

The film's screenplay was written by Ayman Asib Shadhin and Samiul Bhuiyan, with Rashed Zaman served as the cinematographer. The film was released on June 7, 2025 coinciding with Eid al-Adah. The film met with critical acclaim from both critics and audiences. The film was highly praised for its cast performances, humor, music, nostalgia and story. It was also a huge commercial success. Grossing over ৳13 crore against a budget of ৳2 crore, it became one of the highest grossing Bangladeshi film of all time as well as fourth highest grossing Bangladeshi film of 2025

== Plot ==
In the Shantinir area of Mohammadpur, Dhaka, Mobarak celebrates Eid on the roof of his community center along with his relatives. While performing on stage, he suddenly falls into the throes of death before he can finish the song.

One year later, Jahangir, the narrow-minded younger cousin of Mobarak, is running a decorative business in Shantinir, intent on demolishing the community center. The residents of the area are annoyed at him and complain about his behavior and lifestyle, calling him "Khaishta Jahangir" (Rude/Ill-tempered Jahangir). Jahangir's nephew, who has permanently returned from London and whom Jahangir does not care about much, invites him to his house for Eid the next day, and gifts him a Punjabi.

That night, mysterious events start taking place in Jahangir's house; he wakes up from a nightmare in which he sees Mobarak's spirit foretelling him about ghosts showing him his past, present and future. He then finds Chanchal Chowdhury in his house, claiming to be the "Ghost of the Past" in the form of the actor. The ghost shows Jahangir's past life, starting from the death of his parents and shift to Mobarak's house, the death of his elder sister, then meeting a student named Jesmin with whom he falls in love with and later marries, on the conditions that he will allow Jesmin to continue her study and Jesmin takes care of his nephew Joy like a mother.

The ghost disappears all of a sudden, and the Ghost of Present appears in the form of Jaya Ahsan, showing him his life after marriage. Due to him growing self-centered and rude towards Jesmin and Joy, their relationship begins to weaken. His elder sister's husband comes and takes Joy to London with him. Afraid of losing Jesmin, he hides her admit card, preventing her from attending her exams. She later finds the card in a box. Frustrated, she leaves him. Jahangir states he never tried to find out where she went.

The ghost returns him to his house and disappears. Going out for a walk, he meets the Ghost of the Future in the form of Aupee Karim, who shows him the events to occur the next day; first he is shown the poor condition of his coworkers, then his nephew – revealed to be Joy – talking with his wife about Jahangir, and then an elderly Jesmin who is now living with her family in Dhaka.

Returning to the present, Jahangir meets a doctor and narrates the whole story to him. The doctor helps him realize that the ghosts have made him look back at his past mistakes; this inspires him to give up his ill manners. The next day, he pays his respects to Mobarak at the graveyard and starts treating his neighbors with more kindness, and meets Jesmin, who reveals that her first child, Esha, is actually Jahangir's daughter. He meets Esha and invites her at the Eid celebration party, as well as Joy's family. At the party, he promotes his coworker, announcing his retirement, and also announces his decision to keep the community center intact in memory of Mobarak. Jesmin herself comes and drops Esha at the center with Jahangir, who then celebrate Eid together. The film ends with the three ghosts, still in the forms of the actors, watching fireworks in the city from a rooftop.

== Cast ==
- Zahid Hasan as Jahangir, a decoration businessman and event manager
  - Shoumya Joyti as young Jahangir
- Afsana Mimi as Jesmin
  - Sadia Ayman as young Jesmin
- Chanchal Chowdhury as himself, a ghost
- Jaya Ahsan as herself, a ghost
- Aupee Karim as herself, a ghost
- Tariq Anam Khan as Yaqub Ali Mobarak, Jahangir's maternal cousin
  - Arefin Zilani as young Yaqub Ali Mobarak
- Azad Abul Kalam as Rana, Jesmin's husband
- Intekhab Dinar as Dr. Ejazul
- Sunerah Binte Kamal as Esha, Jahangir's daughter
- Naresh Bhuiyan as a guest in Eid night party

== Music ==
The first song from the film, titled Tumi was released on 3 June 2025. The song was written and sung by Aeidid Rashid and the music was arranged by Level Five Band.

The second song, titled Dhushor Shomoy was arranged by Artcell.

No.	Title	Lyrics	Music	Singer	Length
1.	"Tumi"	Aeidid Rashid	Aeidid Rashid	Aeidid Rashid	3:43
2.	"Dhushor Shomoy"	Rumman Ahmed	George Lincoln D'Costa	George Lincoln D'Costa	2:24

== Production ==
The title of the film and its cast were announced on 13 May 2025 at a press conference held at the Gulshan Shooting Club in Dhaka. The film is produced by Dope Productions, with Chorki as a co-producer and Laughing Elephant serving as an associate production company. It features an ensemble cast includes Zahid Hasan, Jaya Ahsan, Aupee Karim, Chanchal Chowdhury, Afsana Mimi, Tariq Anam Khan, Azad Abul Kalam, Intekhab Dinar, Sunerah Binte Kamal, Shommo Jyoti, and Sadia Ayman, among others. The inclusion of such a large number of prominent actors in a single production is considered rare in Bangladeshi cinema.

== Marketing and release ==
=== Marketing ===
On 13 May 2025, the film's poster was unveiled at a press conference held at the Gulshan Shooting Club in Dhaka.

=== Release ===
The film was theatrically released in cinemas on 7 June 2025, coinciding with Eid al-Adha.

== Reception ==
=== Domestic ===
The film earned over Tk 2 crore from multiplexes within 9 days of release, reaching Tk 1.14 crore from 17 cinema halls by day 10. It crossed Tk 2 crore in multiplex earnings by day 16. The film maintained strong momentum, with showtimes increased due to high demand in its second week. This rapid accumulation was highlighted in several entertainment news updates and box office roundups, reflecting the film's strong audience pull and positive word-of-mouth during its theatrical run. Within 29 days, Utshob surpassed 5 crore BDT in revenue from multiplexes alone, making it one of the highest-grossing Bangladeshi films of 2025.

=== Overseas ===
Utshob was released internationally on 20 June 2025 across 37 theatres in the United States, Canada, and the United Kingdom. The North American distribution included major chains such as AMC, Regal, and Cinemark, with Cineplex handling Canada. Cineworld distributed this movie in UK. An Australian release followed on 21 June.

The film grossed approximately USD 93,000 (approximately 11.3 million BDT) in its opening week in North America, making it the second-highest opening week gross for a Bangladeshi film in the region—trailing only Hawa (USD 271,000) and ahead of Priyotoma (USD 84,000). As of late June 2025, Utshob ranked among the top three Bangladeshi films of all time in North American box office earnings.

== Awards ==
Year	Award	Category	Winner	Result	Ref.
2026	Dhallywood Film and Music Awards	Best film of Year 2025	Tanim Noor	Won	
2026	Dhallywood Film and Music Awards	Best Film Director (critics' choice)	Tanim Noor	Won	
2026	Meril-Prothom Alo Awards	Best Film	Tanim Noor	Won	
