= Rashed Zaman =

Bangladeshi cinematographer and cameraman

- রাশেদ জামান
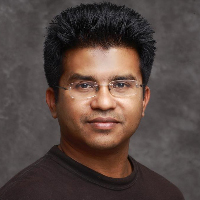
- Occupations: Cinematographer; Cameraman
- Years active: 2001–present
- Notable work: Aynabaji
- Awards: National Film Awards (1st time)

Rashed Zaman is a Bangladeshi cinematographer and cameraman. He won the Bangladesh National Film Award for Best Cinematography for the film Aynabaji (2016).

== Selected films ==
- Bishaash - 2010
- Monkey Mind -2005
- Dub Satar - 2008
- Aynabaji - 2016
- Utshob-2025

== Awards and nominations ==
National Film Awards

| Year | Award | Category | Film | Result |
|---|---|---|---|---|
| 2016 | National Film Award | Best Cinematography | Aynabaji | Won |
