= Sabrina (Bangladeshi TV series) =

2022 Bangladeshi television series

- Genre: Drama thriller
- Created by: Ashfaque Nipun
- Composer: Jahid Nirob
- Country of origin: Bangladesh
- Original language: Bengali
- No. of seasons: 1
- No. of episodes: 8

Production
- Editor: Jobayar Abir Peal

Original release
- Network: Hoichoi
- Release: 25 March 2022

Sabrina is a Bangladeshi drama thriller streaming television series created by Ashfaque Nipun. The cast includes Mehazabien Chowdhury, Nazia Haque Orsha, and Runa Khan. It premiered on Hoichoi on 25 March 2022.

== Premise ==
Nazia Hoque Orsha stars as Sabrina who was burned by a perpetrator in an attempt to burn her courage into ashes. While Mehazabein Chowdhury stars as the courageous doctor, who is also named Sabrina, striving to save the burned victim, give her justice.

— The Business Standard

== Cast ==
- Mehazabien Chowdhury as Dr. Sabrina
- Nazia Haque Orsha as Sabrina Hussain
- Runa Khan as Baby
- Intekhab Dinar as Showkat Hossain
- Hasan Masood as Bahadur
- Yash Rohan as Abhi
- Ejajul Islam as Khurshed Alam
- Faruque Ahamed as Liyakat Hossain

== Episodes ==
No.	Title	Directed by	Written by	Original release date
1	"Odrister Parihash (The Irony of Fate)"	Ashfaque Nipun	Ashfaque Nipun	25 March 2022
2	"Golokdhandha (The Maze)"	Ashfaque Nipun	Ashfaque Nipun	25 March 2022
3	"Ga Dhaka (Cat and Mouse)"	Ashfaque Nipun	Ashfaque Nipun	25 March 2022
4	"Gure Bali (A Fly in the Ointment)"	Ashfaque Nipun	Ashfaque Nipun	25 March 2022
5	"Nagad Narayan (The Cash Cow)"	Ashfaque Nipun	Ashfaque Nipun	25 March 2022
6	"Kingkartabyabimor (The Confusion)"	Ashfaque Nipun	Ashfaque Nipun	25 March 2022
7	"Khanda Pralay (The Opportunity)"	Ashfaque Nipun	Ashfaque Nipun	25 March 2022
8	"Agniparikkha (Do or Die)"	Ashfaque Nipun	Ashfaque Nipun	25 March 2022

== Release ==
On 8 March 2022, Hoichoi unveiled the teaser of the series at A S Mahmud Hall, The Daily Star.
