= Oxygen (2020 film) =

Bangladeshi short film

- Official poster
- Bengali: অক্সিজেন
- Directed by: Raihan Rafi
- Written by: Raihan Rafi
- Produced by: Akbar Haydar Manna; Maksudul Hasan
- Starring: Mahiya Mahi; Forhad Limon; Mahadi Hasan Pial; Rashed Mamun Apu
- Cinematography: Raju Raj
- Edited by: Simit Roy Antor
- Music by: Jahid Nirob
- Production company: Motion Rock Pictures
- Distributed by: Club 11 Entertainment
- Release date: 2 August 2020
- Running time: 33 minutes 37 seconds
- Country: Bangladesh
- Language: Bangla

Oxygen is a Bangladeshi thespian short film released in 2020. The film is scripted and directed by Raihan Rafi against the backdrop of the COVID-19 pandemic and deeply flawed healthcare system. The film stars Mahiya Mahi in a pivotal role which also marks her debut in short film. The film directly premiered on YouTube during Eid-ul-Azha and gained much acclaims from social media for Mahi's acting.

== Plot ==
Oxygen is based on the story of young Maya (Mahiya Mahi) and her 60-year-old father's struggle to find a definite healthcare during the Corona pandemic. Maya and her father belong to an urban middle-class family. Her father is sick and bedridden. Maya takes care of him, and at the same time is annoyed by his haughty behavior. One morning while taking the medicine, her father fainted. Maya faced an ambulance crisis to take her unconscious father for admission at any hospital. Maya has to rush to various hospitals of city in an ambulance carrying her father. Meanwhile a fraudster ran away with her money, the ambulance's wheel got ruined. Maya is seen running to and fro, devoutly praying in hope of divine help, fighting with strangers to provide her father the medical care that he deserves and ought to receive, while time frightfully ticks away during the Corona lock down period. Eventually her father died in the ambulance bed due to lack of oxygen.

== Cast ==
- Mahiya Mahi
- Fakhrul Bashar Masum
- Rashed Mamun Apu
- Farhad Limon
- Mehedi Hosen Pial
- Anwar Hossain
- Anika Tabassum
- Shahana Kamal

== Production ==
Oxygen is marked as the second collaboration between Raihan Rafi and Mahiya Mahi after upcoming Swapnobaji. Principal photography is done by Raju Raj in July,2020. The entire film was shot in Uttara, Jatrabari and Agargaon areas of Dhaka City within two days schedule, mostly in a rented ambulance. As per end credit scene, Simit Roy Antor served as the editor and Jahid Nirob composed background score and a single song for Oxygen.

== Release and reception ==
Promotional campaign of Oxygen was limited to poster release and dropping a single trailer on social media. On 2 August 2020, the film premiered on Club 11 Entertainment's YouTube channel during Eid -al Azha season as planned.

Oxygen has been praised by social media and YouTube viewers upon its release. Mahi has gained critical acclaim for her reinvented look and portraying Maya's character of an ordinary daughter.
