= Agontuk =

2024 Bangladeshi film

- Film poster
- Directed by: Sumon Dhar
- Screenplay by: Sumon Dhar; Anisur Rahman Mishu
- Story by: Sumon Dhar; Anisur Rahman Mishu
- Produced by: Kamal Hasan
- Starring: Shamol Mawla; Puja Cherry; Mili Bashar; Masum Bashar; Shahed Ali; Hindoi Rai
- Cinematography: Farhad Hossain; Sunny Khan; Emad Imran
- Edited by: Raisul Islam Anik; Suboj Khan
- Music by: Adhyan Dhara; Joy Shahriar; Kishor Dash; Choion
- Production company: The Abhi Kathachitra
- Distributed by: The Abhi Kathachitra; Tiger Media
- Release date: 17 June 2024
- Country: Bangladesh
- Language: Bengali

Agontuk is a 2024 Bangladeshi Bengali language psychological thriller film. It is dialogued and directed by Sumon Dhar, story and screenplay done by Sumon Dhar and Anisur Rahman Mishu, and production by Kamal Hasan under the banner of The Abhi Kathachitra. It was distributed by Zahid Hasan Abhi under the banner of The Abhi Kathachitra. Shamol Mawla and Puja Cherry played the lead roles and Mili Bashar, Masum Bashar, Shahed Ali, Hindoi Rai, Anwar Shahin and others played supporting roles in the film. It was released on 17 June 2024.

== Cast ==
- Shamol Mawla as Topu
- Puja Cherry as Srabani Akter "Iti"
- Mili Bashar as Srabani's mother
- Masum Bashar as Srabani's father
- Shahed Ali as Inspector Mahatab
- Hindoi Rai
- Anwara Shahi
- Shikha Khan Mou
- Bithi Rani Sarker

== Production ==
The shooting of this film was completed in 2022. The release of the film was delayed due to non-completion of post-production. On Monday (June 10, 2024), Agontuk received an uncut censor.

== Release ==
The film was planned to release on Valentine's Day of 2024. But this film was not released again because the film Dard was released. This film is also included in the Eid al-Adha release procession. Directed by Suman Dhar, Agontuk has officially announced its release on Eid-ul-Adha of 2024.

On 17 June 2024, the movie was released in 5 theatres on Holiday Eid al-Adha, clashing with Raihan Rafi's Toofan, Rashid Palash's Moyurakkhi, Mostafizur Rahman Manik's Dark World and Mohammad Iqbal's Revenge.
