= Moyurakkhi =

2024 Bangladeshi film

- Film poster
- Directed by: Rashid Polash
- Screenplay by: Golam Rabbani
- Story by: Golam Rabbani
- Produced by: Chowdhury Nizam Nishow
- Starring: Bobby Haque; Sudip Biswas Deep; Sadia Afreen Mahi; Sumit Sengupta; Deepak Suman
- Cinematography: Roy Sandip
- Edited by: Nazibul Islam Moon; Sizan Azmir
- Music by: Jahid Nirob
- Production company: Aazz International Ltd.
- Distributed by: Jaaz Multimedia
- Release date: 17 June 2024
- Country: Bangladesh
- Language: Bengali

Moyurakkhi is a 2024 Bangladeshi thriller film directed by Rashid Polash and story, screenplay and dialogue by Golam Rabbani. It was produced by Chowdhury Nizam Nishow and executive producer was Shahadat Hossain Liton. The music of the film was directed by Jahid Nirob. Bobby Haque and Sudip Biswas Deep played the lead roles and Sadia Afreen Mahi, Sumit Sengupta, Deepak Suman and others played the supporting roles. It was scheduled to release on 17 June 2024 on holiday Eid al-Adha.

== Cast ==
- Bobby Haque as Nayantara "Tara"
- Sudip Biswas Deep as Jia alias Jimmy
- Sadia Afreen Mahi as Shurovi
- Sumit Sengupta as Raisul
- Deepak Suman
- Farzana Chobi
- Samu Chowdhury
- Sabina Punthi
- Farooq
- Muhin Khan
- Manik Shah
- Zulfikar Chanchal

== Production ==
The shooting of the first day of the movie Moyurakkhi started on Tuesday 1 February 2022 at various locations of FDC.

== Release ==
The Maharat ceremony of this movie was held on December 1, 2021. After finishing dubbing, editing and shooting, the movie was scheduled to release in August 2022, but was not released later. In 2023, this film was supposed to be released on Eid al-Adha of 2023. But the filmmakers were not in favor of releasing the film in the rush of Eid films. So later it was scheduled to be released in theaters in September 2023, but was not released. But in 2024, announcing the release of this film on Eid al-Adha of 2024, the makers released a poster of Moyurakkhi on Saturday 11 May 2024 morning.

On 17 June 2024, the movie was released in 2 theaters on the occasion of Eid al-Adha clashing with Raihan Rafi's Toofan, Mostafizur Rahman Manik's Dark World, Sumon Dhar's Agontuk and Mohammad Iqbal's Revenge.

== Controversy ==
There was a conflict between the director of this film, Rashed Palash, and the actress Bobby Haque. People associated with the film said that Bobby slapped the director. Although the producer gave the remuneration of all the artists to the director, he did not pay the artists properly. Haque did not get any match with the Palash's words during the shooting. There are claims that the film was completed for much less than the amount of money that was supposed to be spent on the film.

== Reception ==
The film received mixed reviews.

Ahsan Kabir from Dhaka Tribune rated the film 5 out of 10 and wroted that Samu Chowdhury, Deepak Suman, Samira Mahi, and Farooq was are very well in the roles of them, Deep's voice and role are not good very much and actress Bobby like a senior person on the theater screen than the actor Deep.

Wroted by Masudur Rahman from Shomoyer Alo as "Bobby Haque praised very much for playing the lead role in the film".

Wroted by Dhaka Times24's survey as Shakila Shakir's "Piriter Bazar" song has been received very much response after release on YouTube.

Wroted by Barta 24's survey as Bobby's Moyurakkhi film was a commercial unsuccessful in box office.

Wroted by Alokito Bangladesh's survey as Bobby's Moyurakkhi film failed to hit the box office collection.
