= Redrum (2022 film) =

2022 Bangladeshi mystery thriller film

- Official release poster
- Directed by: Vicky Zahed
- Written by: Vicky Zahed
- Produced by: Redoan Rony; Masudul Mahmud Ruhan
- Starring: Afran Nisho; Mehazabien Chowdhury
- Cinematography: Bidrohi Dipon
- Edited by: Aurnob Hasnat
- Music by: Mahamud Hayet Arpon (songs)
- Production companies: Chorki; Blue Moon Entertainment
- Distributed by: Chorki
- Release date: 17 February 2022
- Running time: 132 minutes
- Country: Bangladesh
- Language: Bengali

Redrum is a 2022 Bangladeshi mystery thriller film written and directed by Vicky Zahed. The film stars Afran Nisho, Mehazabien Chowdhury, Azizul Hakim, Manoj Pramanik, Sallha Khanam Nadia, and Nasir Uddin Khan. It was released on Chorki on 17 February 2022. Vicky Zahed received the Blender's Choice-The Daily Star OTT & Digital Content Awards-2022 at Best director category for the webfilm in 2023.

== Plot ==
Famous musician Shohel is found dead in his bedroom. His wife Neela was sleeping peacefully when the body is discovered. Shohel's childhood friend detective Rashed took charge of the investigation. Although Neela seems to be the prime suspect, everyone around Shohel is not telling the truth. When the present is not serving Rashed anything fruitful, he dives into the past. Unsetting events start to unravel and we learn that lie is nothing but a badly expressed truth.

— Chorki

== Cast ==
- Afran Nisho as Rashed Chowdhury, a CID officer
- Mehazabien Chowdhury as Neela Khan
- Manoj Pramanik as Shohel Khan
- Sallha Khanam Nadia as Lubna
- Nasir Uddin Khan as Iqram, a CID officer
- Azizul Hakim as Karim Sheikh

== Release ==
On 10 February 2022, Chorki dropped the trailer of Redrum on social media. The film was premiered on Chorki on 17 February 2022.

== Reception ==
Shadique Mahbub Islam of The Financial Express praised the cast and the script of the film and wrote, "Vicky Zahed has set the story at the centre of the film, making it the prime focus. A thoroughly analysed script full of intriguing subtitles and a remarkable ending have made the film stand tall in the OTT original films arena".

== Music ==
All the songs has been composed by Mahmud Hayet Arpon.

No.	Title	Lyrics	Singer(s)	Length
1.	"Valobashi"	Mahmud Hayet Arpon	Mahadi Hasan	1:53
