= Cha Gorom =

- Poster
- Directed by: Shankha Dasgupta
- Screenplay by: Saifullah Riad
- Story by: Saifullah Riad
- Produced by: Redoan Rony
- Starring: Safa Kabir; Partho Sheikh; Rezwan Pervez; Sarah Jabin Aditi
- Cinematography: Barkat Hossain Polash
- Edited by: Saleh Sobhan Auneem
- Music by: Ruslan Rehman
- Production companies: Chorki; Oxfam
- Distributed by: Chorki
- Release date: 14 April 2026
- Country: Bangladesh
- Language: Bengali

Cha Gorom is a 2026 Bangladeshi drama film directed by Shankha Dasgupta and produced by Redoan Rony under the banner of Chorki, Oxfam, European Union and Robi. It stars Safa Kabir, Partho Sheikh, Rezwan Pervez, Sarah Jabin Aditi. It was released on OTT platform Chorki on 14 April 2026.

== Cast ==
- Safa Kabir as Irin
- Partho Sheikh as Mithu
- Rezwan Pervez as Robin Chand Murmu
- Sarah Jabin Aditi as Nandini
- Purnima Bristi
- Vijay Dasgupta
- Ratan Dev
- Pankaj Majumder
- Ahsabul Yamin Riad
- A.K. Azad Shetu

== Release ==
The official poster for Cha Gorom was unveiled on Chorki's website on April 5, 2026. The film was released on the OTT platform on April 14, 2026, coinciding with Pohela Boishakh.

== Reception ==
=== Critical response ===
Towheed Feroze of Dhaka Tribune praised the film for blending narrative storytelling with social commentary, highlighting Safa Kabir's performance and the film's realistic depiction of tea garden worker's struggles. Sadi Mohammad Shahnewaz of The Daily Star praised for Shankha Dasgupta's layered storytelling and lead actress Safa Kabir's convincing performance as a doctor.

Farjana Liakat of Prothom Alo praised for sensitively portraying the dignity of tea garden workers through Shankha Dasgupta's direction and poetic dialogue, despite a light performance from lead actress Safa Kabir. Md Saiful Islam of Dhaka Tribune highlighted the film as an effective blend of social advocacy and mainstream entertainment, delivering a humanizing portrait of tea workers through strong performances without relying on victim tropes.

Khandakar Swanan Shahriar of Prothom Alo praised the film for sensitively depicting the struggles of tea garden workers and commended Sankha Dasgupta's direction, the technical execution, and the natural performances of Safa Kabir, Sarah Jebin and Rezwan Parvez, concluding that it effectively blends realism with hope.

=== Audience response ===
In an article for Prothom Alo, the Chorki web film Cha Gorom was noted for receiving widespread audience acclaim on social media, praised for its blend of serious social themes and humor. Reviewers and viewers commended the film's "feel-good" tone, strong cinematography, and natural performances particularly highlighting Rezwan Parvez's portrayal of Robin, alongside strong roles by Safa Kabir, Partho Sheikh, and Sarah Jabin Aditi.

In a review for Dhaka Mail, the web film Cha Gorom was highlighted for generating enthusiastic audience acclaim following its release on Chorki. The report noted that viewers praised the film's compelling story, realistic direction, and natural acting particularly highlighting Safa Kabir's portrayal alongside the supporting cast for effectively depicting social themes within an entertaining format‌.
