= Jaago Bahey =

Bangladeshi anthology period drama streaming television series

- Genre: Anthology; Historical drama
- Created by: Siddiq Ahmed & Sukorno Shahed Dhiman
- Written by: Siddiq Ahmed; Shuhan Rizwan; Sukorno Shahed Dhiman
- Directed by: Siddiq Ahmed; Saleh Sobhan Auneem; Sukorno Shahed Dhiman
- Starring: Chanchal Chowdhury; Mostafa Monwar
- Music by: Ruslan Rehman; Rasheed Sharif Shoaib; MG Kibria
- Country of origin: Bangladesh
- Original language: Bangla
- No. of seasons: 1
- No. of episodes: 3

Production
- Producer: Redoan Rony
- Cinematography: Suman Sarker; Barkat Hossain Polash; Tanveer Ahmed Shovon
- Editors: Saleh Sobhan Auneem; Abdullah Al Mamun; Sazal Alok
- Running time: 30 minutes
- Production company: Film Noir

Original release
- Network: Chorki
- Release: 9 December – 23 December 2021

Jaago Bahey is a Bangladeshi anthology historical drama streaming television series created by Siddiq Ahmed and Sukorno Shahed Dhiman for Chorki. It premiered on 9 December 2021 and ran for three episodes, concluding on 23 December 2021.

== Premise ==
Jaago Bahey is a historical drama anthology television series based on some important events in pre-independent Bangladesh. The first episode, Shobder Khowab, is based on the Bengali language movement in 1952. The second episode, Lights, Camera... Objection has framed the political tension between East Pakistan (later Bangladesh) and the West (later Pakistan) in 1970 through a Bengali filmmaker and a General of the Military regime of Pakistan. The last episode of the series, Bunker Boy, is based on the fight between Mukti Bahini and Pakistan Army during the Bangladesh Liberation War in 1971.

== Cast ==
=== Episode 1 - Shobder Khowab ===
- Chanchal Chowdhury as Illyas
- Farhana Hamid as Illyas's wife
- Lutfur Rahman George as Boss
- A K Azad Shetu as Altaf
- Khalid Mahbub Turjo as Iqbal

=== Episode 2 - Lights, Camera…Objection ===
- Mostafa Monwar as Zahir Raihan
- Intekhab Dinar as Maj. Gen. Rao Farman Ali
- Aparna Ghosh
- Gazi Rakayet
- Ashoke Bepari
- Kazi Delowar Hemonto
- Apurba Majumder
- Mir Naufel Ashrafi Jisan as Amjad Hossain

=== Episode 3 - Bunker Boy ===
- Abdullah Al Sentu

== Episodes ==
No.	Title	Directed by	Written by	Original release date
1	"Shobder Khowab"	Siddiq Ahmed	Siddiq Ahmed	9 December 2021
2	"Lights, Camera…Objection"	Saleh Sobhan Auneem	Shuhan Rizwan	16 December 2021
3	"Bunker Boy"	Sukorno Shahed Dhiman	Sukorno Shahed Dhiman	23 December 2021

== Release ==
Jaago Bahey debuted on 9 December 2021, released weekly on Thursdays, and consists of 3 episodes.

== Reception ==
Panos Kotzathanasis of Asian Movie Plus wrote: "the quality of the series is definitely much above the average TV series, both in context and production values, with the second episode thriving on the first aspect and the third in the second, although the quality is evident in all three". In her review for The Business Standard Fatima Nujhat Quaderi described Jaago Bahey as, "Chorki's new original miniseries 'Jaago Bahey' comes like a breath of fresh air that can teach the new generation about the Liberation War of 1971 that gave birth to the independent nation of Bangladesh".

== Awards ==
Award Title	Category	Awardee	Result	Ref
Blender's Choice–The Daily Star Awards	Best Supporting Female Actor (popular category)	Aparna Ghosh	Won	
Blender's Choice–The Daily Star Awards	Best Editing (popular category)	Saleh Sobhan Auneem	Won	
Blender's Choice–The Daily Star Awards	Best Director (critics' category)	Sukorno Shahed Dhiman	Won	
