= Oshomoy =

2024 Bengali language web film

- Poster of Oshomoy
- Genre: Drama, Thriller
- Written by: Kajal Arefin Ome
- Story by: Kajal Arefin Ome
- Directed by: Kajal Arefin Ome
- Starring: Tasnia Farin; Runa Khan; Iresh Zaker; Tariq Anam Khan; Munira Mithu; Shashwta Datta; Intekhab Dinar; Ziaul Hoque Polash; Saraf Ahmed Jibon
- Country of origin: Bangladesh
- Original language: Bengali

Production
- Producer: Mushfiqur Rahman Manzu
- Cinematography: Kajal Arefin Ome
- Running time: 120 minutes
- Production company: Bongo BD

Original release
- Release: 18 January 2024

Oshomoy (Bengali: অসময় ) is a 2024 Bangladeshi web film. The web film has been directed by Kajal Arefin Ome and produced by Mushfiqur Rahman Manzu. The web film features Tasnia Farin, Runa Khan, Iresh Zaker, Tariq Anam Khan, Intekhab Dinar, Munira Mithu, Shashwta Datta, Ziaul Hoque Polash, Saraf Ahmed Jibon and many others in the roles. The plot revolves around Urbi. Caught between her middle-class background and her rich university friends, Urbi navigates a world of wealth and privilege. But as she chases her dreams, she falls into a life-changing chaos, paying a high price for her ambitions.

== Cast ==
- Tasnia Farin as Urbi
- Runa Khan as lawyer Emily
- Tariq Anam Khan as Urbi's father
- Iresh Zaker as police officer
- Saraf Ahmed Jibon as journalist
- Monira Mithu as Urbi's mother
- Shashwta Datta as Shuvo
- Intekhab Dinar
- Lamima Lam
- Ishrat Zaheen
- Shimul Sharma
- Bappi Ashraf
- Ziaul Hoque Polash (guest appearance)

== Synopsis ==
Urbi belongs to a lower-middle-class family in Dhaka. Failing to secure admission to public universities, she enrolled in a private university despite her family's financial crisis. Making new friends who are affluent, Urbi is over the moon. She also becomes romantically involved with a friend within her close circle of friends. However, a single accident dramatically alters Urbi's life. Her friends don't offer support; instead, they accuse her of a mistake that they themselves encouraged her to make.
