= Mehazabien Chowdhury =

Bangladeshi actress (born 1991)

- মেহজাবীন চৌধুরী
- Mehazabien in 2023
- Born: 19 April 1991 (age 35); Chittagong, Bangladesh
- Occupation: Actress
- Years active: 2009–present
- Notable work: Boro Chele; Redrum; Sabrina; Punorjonmo
- Title: Lux Channel I Superstar 2009
- Spouse: Adnan Al Rajeev (m. 2025)
- Awards: See full list

Mehazabien Chowdhury (Bengali: মেহজাবীন চৌধুরী; born 19 April 1991) is a Bangladeshi actress, model and the winner of Lux Channel I Superstar 2009. She began her acting career after winning Lux Channel I Superstar, a Bangladeshi beauty pageant.

Chowdhury rose to prominence after featuring in a television commercial for Banglalink, a mobile phone operator. She made her debut in the television drama Tumi Thako Shindhu Pare, which was broadcast on ATN Bangla. Since then, she has starred in several dramas such as Boro Chele, Chompa House, Buker Ba Pashe, Alo, Lota Audio, Chirokal Aaj, and Kajoler Din Ratri.

== Early life and education ==
Chowdhury was born on 19 April 1991 in Chittagong, Bangladesh.

On 14 February 2025, Mehzabien married director, producer, and screenwriter Adnan Al Rajeev.

== Career ==
Chowdhury began her career as a model. She was crowned as Lux Channel I Superstar in 2009 where Mounita Khan Ishana finished as first runner up and Sadika Swarna finished as second runner up. After winning the Lux Channel I Superstar contest, she started working in the media regularly.

Chowdhury's first television debut was in Tumi Thako Shindhu Parey. She then started to appear in television commercials.

In 2016, Chowdhury served as a guest judge on the dance reality show Mangoli-Channeli Shera Nachiye.

Chowdhury played the heroine in the romantic-comedy telefilm Ekai 100, and in 2017, she starred in the television drama Boro Chele.

In 2020, Chowdhury was chosen as a brand ambassador for Bata Bangladesh, a multinational footwear brand. In 2023, Chowdhury was announced as a brand ambassador for Daraz Bangladesh, an online marketplace. Chowdhury is currently a brand ambassador of Nihar Naturals hair oil.

In February 2022, her first web film, Redrum, directed by Vicky Zahed, was released on Chorki.

In 2022, Chowdhury appeared as a guest judge for a singing reality show Square Surer Shera which was broadcast on Maasranga Television.

== Filmography ==
=== Feature film ===
Key
†	Denotes films that have not yet been released

Year	Film	Role	Notes	Ref.
2024	Priyo Maloti	Maloti Rani	Debut film	
2025	Neel Shukh	Arpa	Released on Binge	
2025	Saba	Saba		
2027	Pulsirat †	TBA	Filming	
2027	Opolok †	TBA	Filming	

=== TV drama ===
Year	Drama	Role	Director	Aired Channel	Notes
2009	Odhora				
2018	Buker Ba Pashe		Mizanur Rahman Aryan	NTV	Eid Ul Fitr
2018	Ghure Daranor Golpo		Mizanur Rahman Aryan	ATN Bangla	TV Drama
2020	Third Eye		Sraboni Ferdous	Rtv Drama	TV Drama
2021	Plus Four Point Five		Shihab Shaheen	NTV	Aired in Eid Ul Adha
2021	Punorjonmo	Rokeya	Vicky Zahed	Channel I	TV Drama Series
2021	Punorjonmo 2	Nila, Rokeya	Vicky Zahed	Channel I	TV Drama Series
2022	Matinee Show		Noyeem Imtiaz Neamul	Channel i	Eid Ul Fitr
2022	Punorjonmo 3	Rokeya	Vicky Zahed	Channel I	TV Drama Series

=== Web Films & Series ===
Year	Title	OTT	Character	Co-Artist	Director	Notes
2022	Sabrina	Hoichoi	Dr.Sabrina	Nazia Haque Orsha Intekhab Dinar Runa Khan Hasan Masood Yash Rohan	Ashfaque Nipun	Web Series
2022	Redrum	Chorki	Neela Khan	Afran Nisho	Vicky Zahed	Webfilm on Chorki
2023	Kajoler Dinratri	Deepto Play	Kajol	Tawsif Mahbub	Vicky Zahed	Webfilm on Deepto TV
2023	The Silence	Binge		Shamol Mawla	Vicky Zahed	Web Series
2023	Neel Joler Kabbo	iScreen		Afran Nisho	Shihab Shaheen	Webfilm on iScreen

== Awards and nominations ==
Year	Awards	Category	Result	Notes
2009	Lux Channel I Superstar		Won	
2017	Meril Prothom Alo Awards	Best TV Actress	Won	Drama: Boro Chhele
2018	Meril Prothom Alo Awards	Best TV Actress	Won	Drame: Buker Bapashe
2018	Babisas Award	Best TV Actress	Won	Drama: Sonali Danar Chil
2019	Meril Prothom Alo Awards	Best Actress - Critics Choice (Television)	Won	Drama: Ei Shohore
2019	Meril Prothom Alo Awards	Best Actress - Popular Choice (Television)	Won	Drama: Sheshta Shundor
2021	CJFB Performance Award	Best TV Actress	Won	Best TV Actress For Irina
2021	Meril Prothom Alo Award	Best TV Actress	Won	
2021	2nd ICT–Channel i Digital Media Awards	Best TV Actress	Won	Best TV Actress for Punorjonmo
2023	BFDA Awards	Best OTT Actress	Won	Best Actress for Redrum
2023	Blender's Choice-The Daily Star OTT Awards	Best OTT Actress	Won	Best Actress for Redrum
2026	Meril Prothom Alo Award	Best TV Actress	Won	Character: Saba
2026	BIFA Awards	Best Actress	Won	Character: Saba
2026	Blender's Choice-The Daily Star OTT & Digital Content Awards	Best Actress	Won	For the character Arpa from Neel Shukh
