= Shoumya Joyti =

Bangladeshi actor

- সৌম্য জ্যোতি
- Born: 14 October 2001 (age 24)
- Citizenship: Bangladeshi
- Education: English literature
- Alma mater: North South University
- Occupation: Film actor
- Parents: Brindaban Das (father); Shahnaz Khushi (mother)
- Relatives: Dibyo Jyoti (brother)

Shoumya Joyti (born 14 October 2001) is a Bangladeshi actor who has gained recognition through his performances in dramas, films, and television shows.

== Early life ==
Shoumya Joyti was born on 14 October 2001. He is the son of renowned screenwriter and acting duo Brindaban Das and Shahnaz Khushi. He has a twin brother named Divya Jyoti. From childhood, he had a keen interest in acting. Alongside his studies, he was involved in stage drama and various media-related activities. Soumya Jyoti completed his studies in English Literature from North South University. and Victoria University Australia

== Career ==
Shoumya Joyti began his acting career as a child artist. He first caught the audience’s attention by portraying the childhood version of actor Chanchal Chowdhury in the popular drama Padukabitan. Gradually, he started acting in commercials, television dramas, and films. Soumya received widespread praise for his role in the Hoichoi web series Kaiser, directed by Tanim Noor, where he shared the screen with Afran Nisho.

== Filmography ==
Year	Title	Role	Director	Notes
2022	Kaiser	Ananta	Tanim Noor	Web series
2023	Internsheep	Shuvro Reza	Rezaur Rahman	Web series
2023	Dursahosi Khoka	Sheikh Mujibur Rahman	Mushfiqur Rahman Gulzar	
2024	A Tale of Two Sisters		Akram Khan	
2024	Maya		Animesh Aich	Web movies
2024	Bebohar Bibhrat		Hanif Sanket	TV movies
2025	Utshob	Young Jahangir	Tanim Noor	

== Awards and nominations ==
Year	Award	Category	Work	Result	Ref
2023	Meril-Prothom Alo Awards	Best Actor	Internsheep	Nominated	
