= North End (café) =

Bangladeshi coffee shop and coffee supplier

North End Coffee Roasters

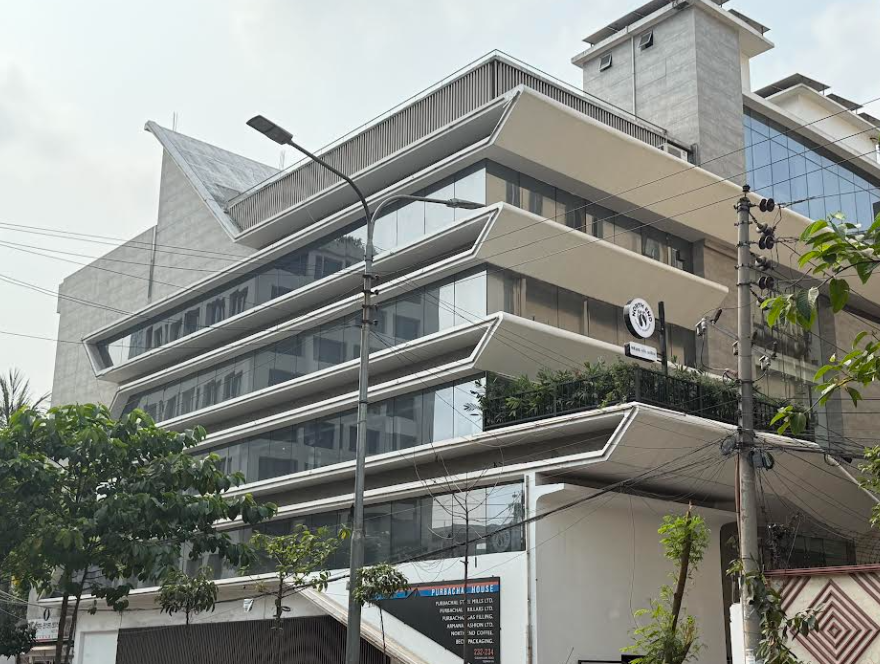
- Type: Private
- Industry: Coffee shop
- Founded: 2011 in Dhaka, Bangladesh
- Founders: Rick Hubbard
- Number of locations: 14 outlet (2025)
- Area served: Bangladesh
- Products: Coffee beverages; smoothies; tea; baked goods; sandwiches
- Website: northendcoffee.com

North End is a Bangladeshi coffee shop whose main business is roasting and supplying coffee beans to various establishments around the country. The company buys most of the coffee beans grown in Bangladesh and also imports coffee beans from various places around the world. They also provide training and equipment to baristas. Though based in Bangladesh, the company is under American management.

North End Pvt. Ltd. is a full-service coffee solutions provider in Bangladesh, offering branding, equipment, roasted beans, and support to grow the coffee culture.

One of their core policies is not to ask customers to leave, no matter how long they stay.

== History ==
In 2001, Rick Hubbard, former manager of Starbucks, and his wife Chris Hubbard came to Bangladesh for her job and later thought about opening a coffee shop in the country. In 2009 they started to develop a business plan, and in 2011 they opened the first coffee shop near the US embassy in Dhaka.

In 2019, they were fined for reportedly using date expired milk. The shop responded by stating that the milk was never served to a customer and was unused.

In 2022, USAID and North End stated that they have a joint venture to grow coffee beans in Bangladesh's hill tract region. They buy about 400–500 kg of coffee beans annually from Bandarban, a district in the south-east hill tract region of Bangladesh. They have been selling the hill tract blend for about 5–6 years as of 2022. It is said that the coffee production in the region started a century earlier when missionaries brought coffee and planted them in Ruma.

In 2025, there was a complaint that they do not use a sales data controller, but instead use PoS software for Value-added tax collection. When asked about this issue, their spokesperson complained about issues with the sales data controller machine.

== Reception ==
North End has been noted in media as having ardent supporters for their shop, as well as a positive effect on local coffee culture.
