= Brindaban Das =

Bangladeshi television actor

- বৃন্দাবন দাস
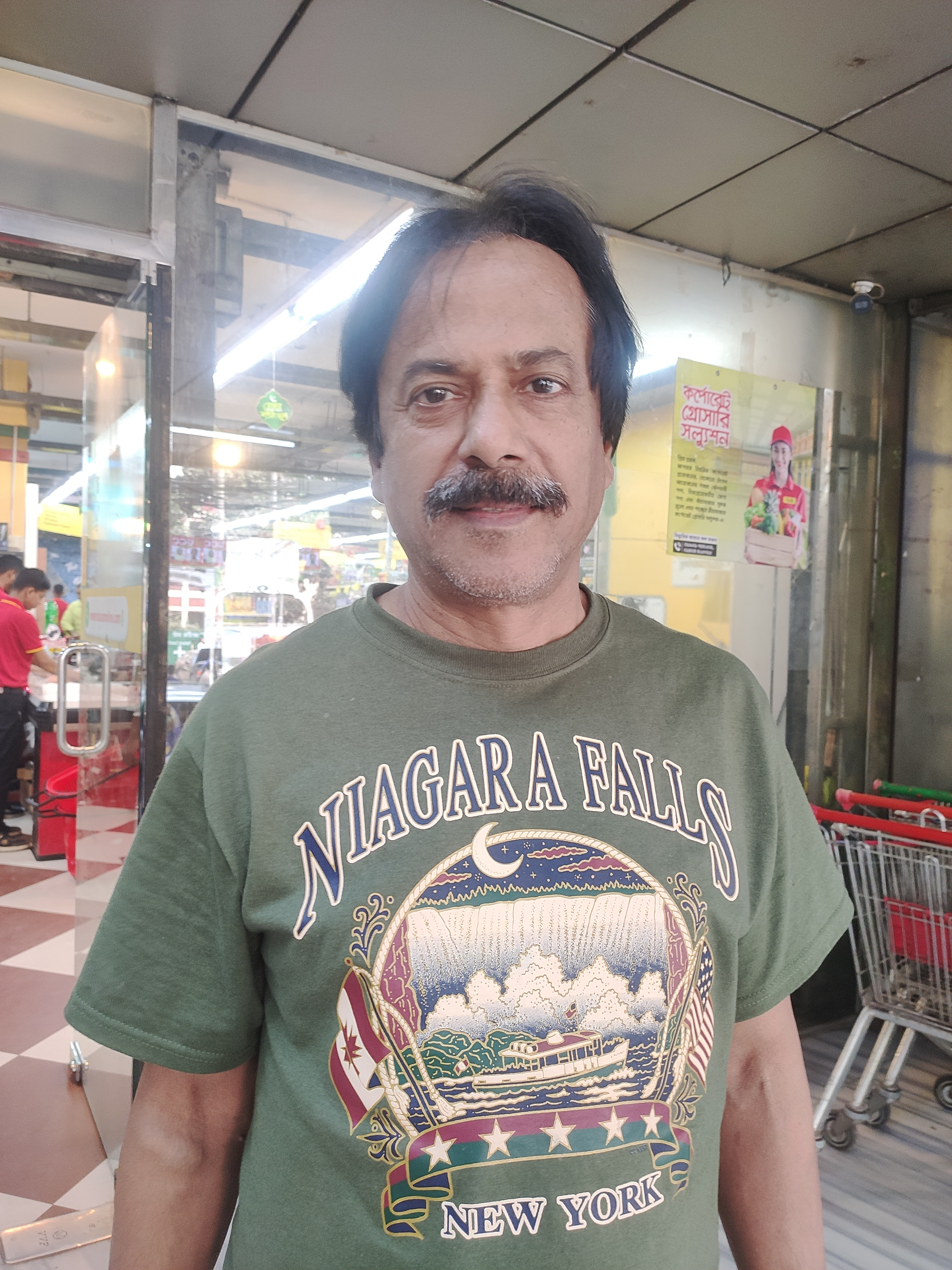
- Das in 2025
- Born: 7 December 1970 (age 55); Pabna District, East Pakistan, Pakistan
- Education: Jagannath College
- Occupations: Actor, writer, playwright
- Years active: 1985–present
- Spouses: Shahnaz Khushi (m. 1994)
- Children: 2, including Shommo Jyoti

Brindaban Das is a Bangladeshi playwright, actor, writer, and director. He won the best dramatist award from the Bangladesh Cine-Journalist Association and the Bangladesh Cultural Reporters Association. He was again nominated as the best dramatist by the Cultural Reporters Association of Bangladesh. He wrote about two hundred plays and sequels, including Harkipte, Sakin Sarisuri, Ghar Kutum, Patri Chai, Tin Geda, Service Holder, Gharkutum, Mohor Sheikh, and Jamai Mela.

Das has been an adjunct faculty member of the Theatre and Performance Department at the Jatiya Kabi Kazi Nazrul Islam University since September 2023.

== Early life and education ==
Das was born in Sanrora village of Chatmohar Upazila in Pabna District. His father, Dayala Krishna Das, was a renowned kirtanist, well versed in padavali kirtans and literature. His mother, Mayna Rani, died in 2018 at the age of 75 due to a heart attack. Brindaban Das completed his primary education at Shalikha Government Primary School. He passed SSC from Chatmohar RCN and BSN High School and HSC from Chatmohar Government Degree College. Later he obtained BSS and MSS degrees in political science from Jagannath College (now Jagannath University) under Dhaka University.

== Career ==
In 1981, Das left his home to join Abahani Club in Dhaka to become a famous football player. He told the legendary footballer Amalesh Sen about his feelings but failed and returned to his hometown. For three consecutive years from 1984, he was awarded a medal as the best footballer of his Upazila.

Das started his acting career in 1985. His debut drama was Chor at Chatmohar Cultural Council. Although his role in his first drama was insignificant. Later, he joined Mamunur Rashid's Aranyak Natyadal. In 1997, he left Aranyak Natyadal and formed Pracchyanatya and wrote the play called Kadte Mana. Surer Alo is his short stories collection that contains four of his stories.

In 1994, Das worked as a junior officer at the head office of Delta Life Insurance Company for some time. Until 2006, he worked in the international development organization Care Bangladesh. He was Election Commissioner in Television Program Producers Association of Bangladesh along with Masum Aziz and Naresh Bhuiyan.

== Personal life ==
Das married actress Shahnaz Khushi on 19 January 1994 after dating for eight years. They have twin sons, Dibya Jyoti and Shoumya Joyti.

== Works ==
Notable plays written by Brindaban Das include:

- Kadte Mana (1997; stage play)
- Dorir Khela (stage play)
- Oronno Songbad (stage play)
- Konna (stage play)
- Bondhuboreshu (1999; First drama on TV by Brindaban)
- Ghor-Kutum
- Onishchit Jatra (directed by Mamunur Rashid)
- Alta Sundori
- Manik Chor
- Biyer Phul
- Rosu Chor
- Pal Bari
- Shil Bari
- Goru Chor
- O Pakhi Tor Jontrona
- Pita Bonam Putro Gong
- Tritiyo Purush
- Piliyar
- Waren
- Talk Show
- Jamai Mela
- Harkipte
- Mohor Sheikh
- Sakin Sarisuri
- Choita Pagol
- Shonda Panda

== Television ==
- Harkipte
- Service Holder (2016)
- Shil Bari (2020)
- Pal Bari (2022)
- Mohor Sheikh
- Bibek Mojid
- Alamot
- Ar Matro Koyda Din
- Tritiyo Purush
- Jamai Daoyat
- Membor
- Gun Mojid

== Filmography ==
Year	Film	Role	Director	Note
2016	Onnobuj			Debut film
2016	Aynabaji	Labu Miya	Amitabh Reza Chowdhury	
2018	Alta Banu		Arun Chowdhury	

== Awards and nominations ==
Bachsas Awards

Year	Category	Nomination	Result	Ref
2008	Best playwright	Chayabaj	Won	

Television Reporters Association of Bangladesh Award

Year	Category	Nomination	Result	Ref
2012	Best playwright – Series	Kothar Diginto	Won	

RTV Star Award

Year	Category	Nomination	Result	Ref
2019	Best drama series writer	Heavyweight Mizan	Won	
2019	Best drama series writer	D-20	Nominated	
