= Ashfaque Nipun =

Bangladeshi television director

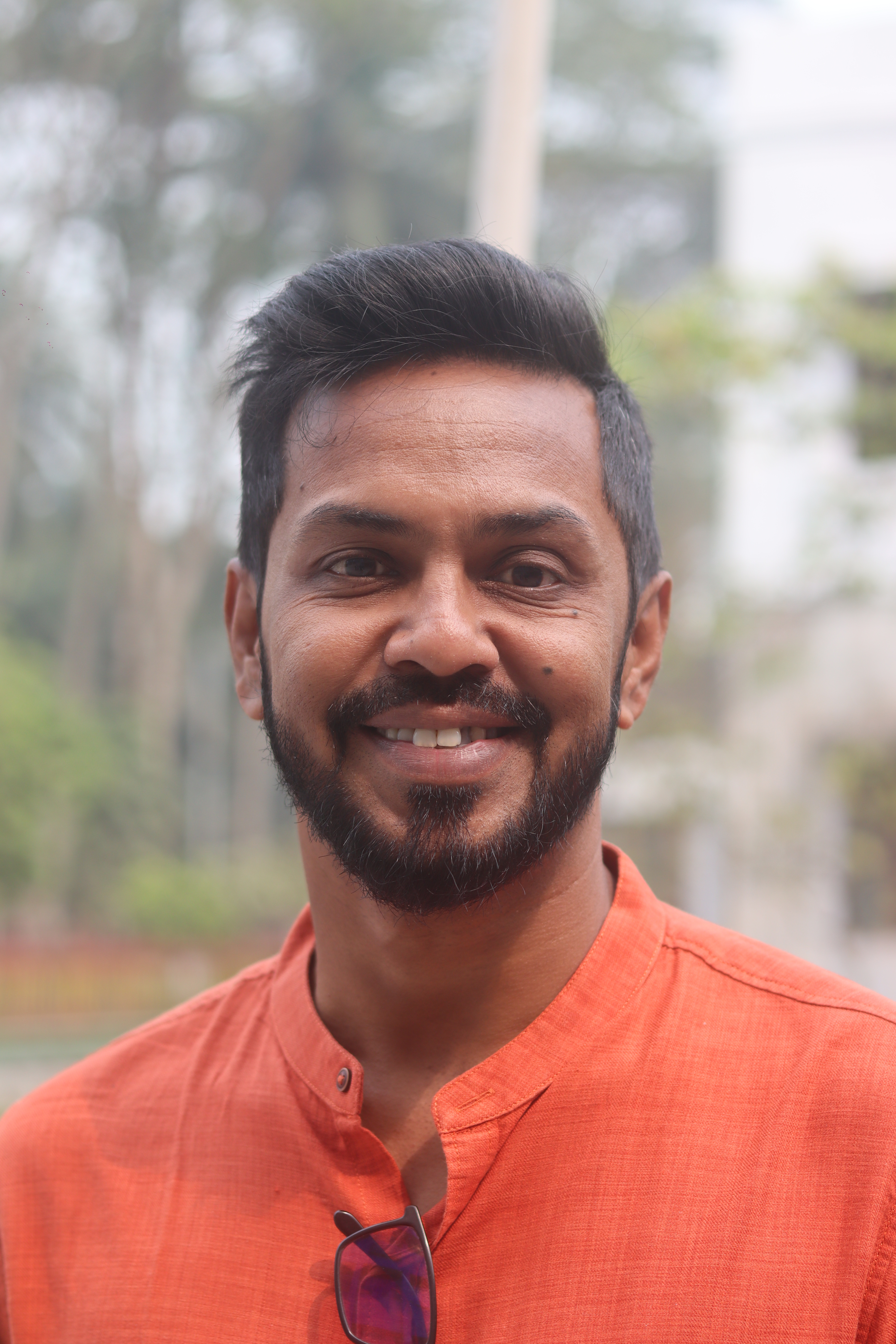
- Ashfaque Nipun at TEDx Bangladesh Agricultural University, in 2025
- Born: 26 August 1980 (age 46); Chittagong, Bangladesh
- Occupations: Director; screenwriter; actor
- Years active: 2005–present
- Notable work: Mohanagar
- Spouse: Elita Karim (m. 2015)

Ashfaque Nipun (born 26 August 1980) is a Bangladeshi television director and screenwriter. He began his career in television as an assistant to director Mostofa Sarwar Farooki. He made his directorial debut in 2005. Although he initially directed romantic and comedy television dramas, he later became known for social and political dramas. He won Meril-Prothom Alo Critics Award for Best Screenwriter in 2017 for Dondo Shomash and Meril-Prothom Alo Critics Award for Best Director in 2019 for Ei Shohore. He is also known for creating the acclaimed web series Mohanagar and Sabrina.

== Early life & career ==
Nipun grew up in Chattogram. His father was an expatriate, working as an electrical engineer in Abu Dhabi, United Arab Emirates. He was interested in theatre and television from an early age. His ambition to become a director eventually brought him to Dhaka. He entered television drama production through Chabial, the production house founded by Mostofa Sarwar Farooki, where he worked as Farooki's assistant director.

His first television drama as a director was Ma-Ya, followed by 2 in 1. His first widely recognized work was Madhurenu Samapayet, starring Tahsan Khan and Rafiat Rashid Mithila. Other notable television dramas directed by him include Landphoner Dingulite Prem (2015), She Ebong She, Sukher Charpatra, Obak Bhalobashay, Khutinati Khunsuti, Dakatiya Banshi, Mukim Brothers, Komola Ranga Rod, Cheleta Kintu Bhalo Chhilo, Kanamachi Bho Bho, Laila Tumi Ki Amake Miss Koro, Chaka and Rainbow.

During Eid al-Fitr in 2017, Dondo Shomash part of Aynabaji Original Series, was broadcast simultaneously on Deepto TV, Gazi TV and RTV. The drama earned him Meril-Prothom Alo Critics Award for Best Screenwriter.

In 2018, he directed Ferar Poth Nei, a television drama based on issues such as enforced disappearances, murder, rape and extrajudicial killings in Bangladesh. Later that year, he directed Sonali Danar Chil, a drama inspired by the public controversy over examination question paper leaks.

During Eid al-Fitr in 2019, his television drama Miss Shiuli was aired on NTV. In the same year, he directed Ei Shohore, for which he received Meril-Prothom Alo Critics Award for Best Director.

In 2020, his television films Victim and Iti, Ma were released during Eid al-Adha under the Turn Production banner.

On 15 January 2021, his first web film Koshtoneer, was released on Hoichoi. Starring Tariq Anam Khan, Runa Khan, Saeed Babu, Shyamal Mawla, Sabila Nur and Yash Rohan, the film was described by The Daily Star as "a compelling commentary on family life." For this work, Nipun won Blenders Choice–The Daily Star OTT and Digital Content Award for Best Web Film Director.

On 25 June 2021, his first web series Mohanagar, premiered on Hoichoi. Starring Mosharraf Karim, the series received widespread critical acclaim. For Mohanagar, he won Channel i Digital Media Award and Blenders Choice–The Daily Star OTT and Digital Content Award for Best Web Series Director. The second season, which continued the story and addressed the unresolved ending of the first season, was released on 20 April 2023.

On 25 March 2022, his web series Sabrina premiered on Hoichoi. The series starred Mehazabien Chowdhury and Nazia Haque Orsha in the lead roles.

In September 2024, Nipun declined an appointment to the Bangladesh Film Censor Board. Nipun had previously voiced concerns about the existing censor board system. He cited these concerns as the reason for turning down the offer.

== Film-making ==
Nipun prefers to work with what he considers to be the taboo and sensitive subjects of society.

== Significant works ==
=== Television and Web Series ===
Year	Title	Credited as		Notes	Ref.
Year	Title	Director	Writer	Notes	Ref.
2010	Mukim Brothers	Yes	Yes	Web series on Channel i	
2021	Mohanagar	Yes	Yes	Web series on Hoichoi	
2022	Sabrina	Yes	Yes	Web series on Hoichoi	
2023	Mohanagar 2	Yes	Yes	Web series on Hoichoi	
2025	Jimmi	Yes	Yes	Web series on Hoichoi	

=== Television and Web films ===
Year	Title	Credited as		Notes	Ref.
Year	Title	Director	Writer	Notes	Ref.
2013	Dakatia Banshi	Yes	Yes	Banglavision	
2019	Ei Shohore	Yes	Yes	Bongo BD	
2019	Miss Shiuly	Yes	Yes	Bongo BD	
2020	Mukh O Mukhosher Golpo	Yes	Yes	Bongo BD	
2020	Eti Maa	Yes	Yes	Cinematic	
2020	Victim	Yes	Yes	Cinematic	
2021	Koshtoneer	Yes	Yes	Hoichoi	

=== Television dramas ===
Year	Title	Credited as		Ref.
Year	Title	Director	Writer	Ref.
2006	2 in 1	Yes	Yes	
2007	Modhuren Somapoyet	Yes	Yes	
2013	Landphone Er Dingulote Prem	Yes	Yes	
2014	He & She	Yes	Yes	
2015	Oviman Porbo	Yes	Yes	
2015	Matal Hawa	Yes	Yes	
2015	Shukher Chharpotro	Yes	Yes	
2015	Obak Bhalobashay	Yes	Yes	
2018	Sonali Danar Chil	Yes	Yes	
2019	Agontuk	Yes	Yes	

=== As an actor ===
Year	Title	Role	Notes	Ref.				
Year	Title	Role	Notes	Ref.	2006	2 in 1	Nipun	Released on Channel 1
Un-Manush	Rigan	Released on NTV			2006			
2007	Uposhonghar	Humayun	Released on Channel i					
2009	First Date	Adnan	Released on NTV					

== Awards and nominations ==
Year	Awards	Category	Work	Results
2017	Meril-Prothom Alo Awards	Best Scriptwriter (Television)	Dondo Shomash	Won
2019	Meril-Prothom Alo Awards	Best Scriptwriter (Television)	Ei Shohore	Won
2021	Hoichoi Awards	Best director of the Year (Bangladesh)	Mohanagar	Won
2021	Meril-Prothom Alo Awards	Best director (web series)	Mohanagar	Won
2021	Channel i Digital Media Awards	Best director (web series)	Mohanagar	Won
2021	Blender's Choice–The Daily Star Awards	Best Director, Series (popular category)	Mohanagar	Won
2021	Blender's Choice–The Daily Star Awards	Best Director, Film (popular category)	Koshtoneer	Won

== Personal life ==
Ashfaque Nipun is married to Elita Karim since May 2015. The couple first met in 2010, during the premiere of Mukim Brothers.
