= Runa Khan (actress) =

Bangladeshi actress

- রুনা খান
- Khan in 2026
- Occupation: Actress
- Spouses: Eshon Waheed
- Children: 1

Runa Khan is a Bangladeshi television and film actress. She won the Bangladesh National Film Award for Best Supporting Actress and Bachsas Awards for her role in the film Haldaa (2017). She also won Meril-Prothom Alo Critics Choice Award for Best Film Actress for her film Chitkini.

== Personal life ==
Khan is married to Eshon Waheed. Together they have a daughter.

== Works ==
=== Films ===
- Haldaa (2017) as Jui
- Chhitkini (2017) as Maimuna
- Kalo Megher Bhela (2019) as Rozie
- Koshtoneer (2020) as Rizu
- Antonagar (2022) as Rojina
- Ekti na bola golpo (2023) as Arifa
- Oshomoy (2024) as Emily
- Nilpadma (2025) as Nila

=== Web series ===
- Sabrina (2022)
- Bodh (2022)
- Murder 90's (2023)
- Bohemian Ghora (2025)
- Pap Kahini (2025)
- Bohemian Ghora (2025)

== Awards and nominations ==
Years	Awards	Category	Work	Result	Ref.
2018	Meril Prothom Alo Awards	Best TV Actress (Critics)	Chitkini	Won	
2019	National Film Awards	Best Actress (Supporting Role)	Haldaa	Won	
2023	BIFA Awards	Best Actress	Bodh	Won	
2025	Blender's Choice–The Daily Star OTT & Digital Content Awards	Best Actress (Supporting Role)	Osomoy	Won	
2026	BIFA Awards	Best Breakthrough Actress (OTT)	Bohemian Ghora	Won	
