= Manoj Pramanik =

Bangladeshi actor

- Born: Manoj Kumar Pramanik; Naogaon, Rajshahi, Bangladesh
- Occupations: Actor, Model
- Years active: 2008–Present , Teaching (Present) Jatiya Kabi Kazi Nazrul Islam University
- Awards: Meril-Prothom Alo Awards

Manoj Kumar Pramanik (Bengali: মনোজ কুমার প্রামাণিক) is a television and cinema actor from Bangladesh who also teaches at universities. Manoj has participated in a number of Bangladeshi TV dramas, both on TV and on the web. His debut film is titled "Eti Tomarai Dhaka." His forthcoming movies include Operation Sundarbans, Mon Mondir, Manusher Bagan, Mission Extreme, and Bhalobasher Pritilota.

== Early life and education ==
Pramanik was born in Rajshahi's Radhanagar, in the Niamatpur Upazila, Naogaon District. His grandfather was a teacher, and his father was the college's principal. They did, however, also perform on the Jatra. His mother used to sing, and his upbringing was influenced by the arts. He has two brothers and one sister. He studied theatre and performing arts at the University of Rajshahi. At the University of Rajshahi, he pursues a degree in theater and performing arts. He works as an actor and teaches in the Department of Film and Media studies at Jatiya Kabi Kazi Nazrul Islam University,

== Profession ==
In 2006, he began assisting Amitabh Reza Chowdhury as a director. While attending Rajshahi University in 2006, he appeared in the film "Balu Ghari" as an actor. He appeared in a Grameenphone commercial in 2010, Appeared in the 2014 film Kache Ashar Golpo and a subsequent play in the series. He collaborated with Tasnuva Tisha on a Banglalink commercial in 2020. He first began performing often in 2014. His major works include "Phul Phutanur Khela," "Kotha Chilo," "Mon Bolche Jabo Jabo," "Sirer Meye," "Bhairobi," "NIshidha Bashor," "Twin Returns," "Viral Girl," "Two Mad Man," "Kotha Hobe To?" Redrum and "Potongoshikari Phul."

His major works include "Phul Phutanur Khela," "Kotha Chilo," "Mon Bolche Jabo Jabo," "Sirer Meye," "Bhairobi," "NIshidha Bashor," "Twin Returns," "Viral Girl," "Two Mad Man," "Kotha Hobe To?" Redrum and "Potongoshikari Phul."

He also appeared in the film Saturday Afternoon by Mostofa Sarwar Farooki, The Halt by Gaushey Alexander, and Shahoshika, which was directed by Tanim Rahman Angsu. In the most recent episode of TV series Taqdeer, webfilm Darkside of Dhaka Redrum 's performance enthralled the viewers.

=== As a producer ===
He founded the production company MANpaCHITRA in 2021 with his pupils, and the two of them produced the eid-themed short film TV series 7 Dugune 14, which premiered on Deepto TV and is also currently available on the OTT platform Bioscopelive. The university student who is directing all of the shotfilm in this series. Two further Manpachitra-produced movies are Akjon Telapuka, which was just released in Chorki, and Jay Jay Din, awaiting release.
