= Mizanur Rahman Aryan =

Bangladeshi television director and scriptwriter

- মিজানুর রহমান আরিয়ান
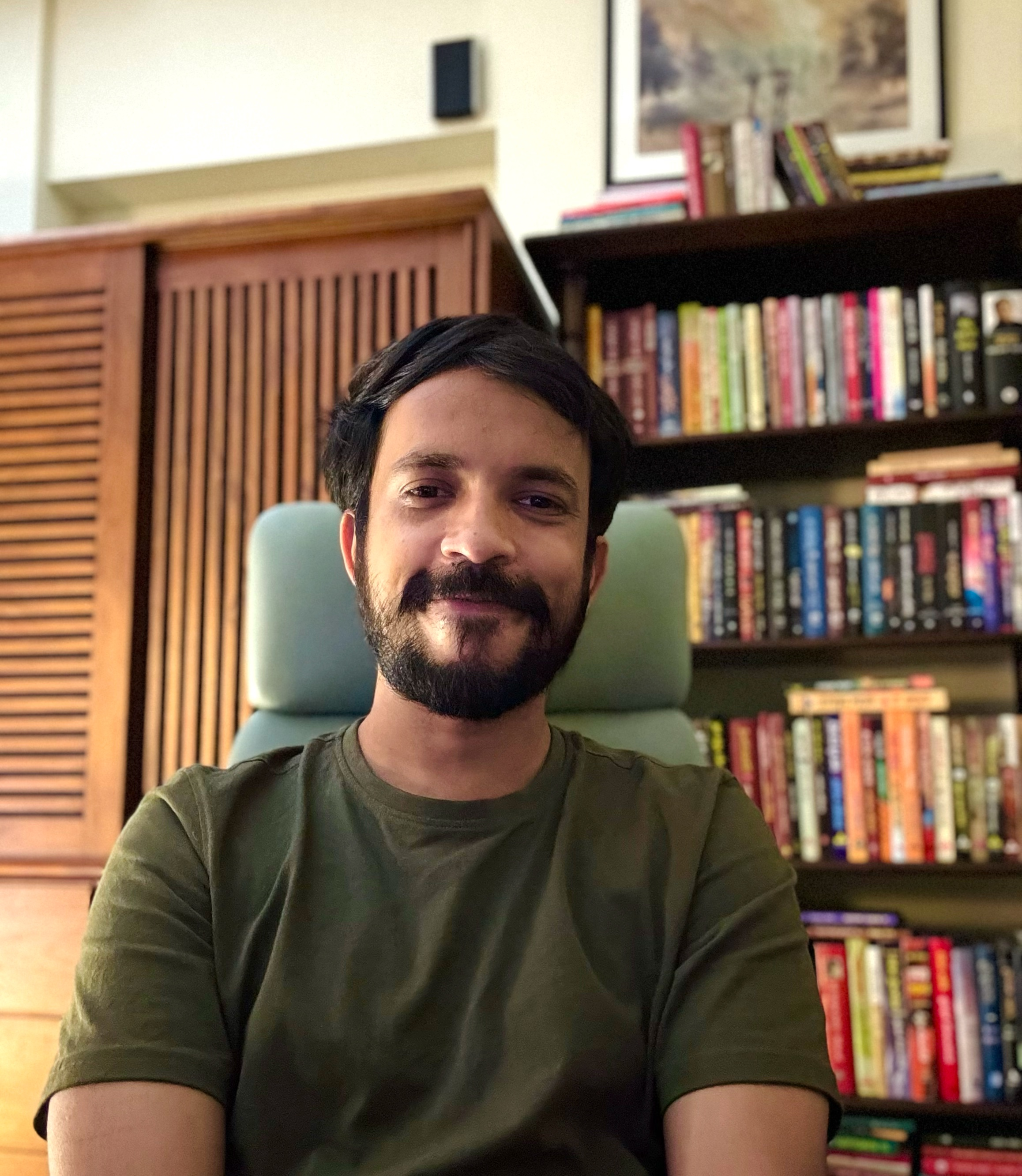
- Mizanur Rahman Aryan in 2023
- Born: 29 November 1991 (age 34); Nangalkot, Cumilla, Bangladesh
- Education: Southeast University
- Occupation: TV director
- Years active: 2012–present
- Notable work: Boro Chele, Buker Ba Pashe, Network Er Baire, Unish 20, Batch 27.

Mizanur Rahman Aryan (মিজানুর রহমান আরিয়ান; born 29 November 1991) is a Bangladeshi television and film director and scriptwriter who directed the telefilm Boro Chele, which is the most viewed Bangladeshi telefilm in YouTube. He has directed more than 120 Dramas, telefilms and serial since 2012.

== Early life and education ==
Arian was born on 29 November 1991 in Nangalkot Upazila, Cumilla. He completed his Secondary School Certificate (SSC) from Cumilla Zilla School and his Higher Secondary Certificate (HSC) from Birshreshtha Noor Mohammad Public College (formerly Rifles Public School and College). He later earned a degree in Textile Engineering from a Textile Engineering College.

== Career ==
He began his career as a director in a television drama in 2012. His first hit drama Boro Chele crossed 48 million views on YouTube. His videos "Boro Chele" and "Buker Ba Pashe" received Meril Prothom Alo Awards.

== Television ==
- Tumi Ami Shey (2012)
- Shponogulo Tai Oshompurono (2012)
- Megh Bristy Otopor (2012)
- Golpogulp Amader (2012)
- Jibon Ebong Kichu Shopno (2012)
- Golpota Tomar Amar (2012)
- Trump Card (2013)
- Shomvodon Tin Prokar (2013)
- Trump Card the Rise of Maria (2013)
- Lets Fly (2014)
- In A Relationship (2014)
- Couple (2014)
- Ekhono Ami (2015)
- Prem Tumi (2015)
- Angry Bird (2015)
- Amar Golpe Tumi (2015)
- Tai Tomake (2015)
- To Airport (2015)
- Opekkhar Sesh Dine (2016)
- Shei Cheleta (2016)
- Shei Meyeta (2016)
- Prem Amar (2016)
- Utthshorgo (2016)
- Mr And Mrs (2016)
- Kothopokothon (2016)
- Twenty One Twenty Eight (2016)
- Fan Page (2016)
- 15 Din (2017)
- Hate Rekhe Haat (2017)
- Tomar Amar Prem (2017)
- Batch 27 (2017)
- Batch 27 Last Page (2017)
- Boro Chele(2017)
- Thikana (2017)
- Forever (2018)
- Buker Ba Pashe (2018)
- Golpogulo Amader (2018)
- Password (2018)
- Valo Theko Tumio (2019)
- Rini (2019)
- Mon Mondire (2019)
- Kokhono Na Kokhno (2019)
- Sesh Ki Hoyechilo Sotti (2019)
- Dekha Hobe ki (2019)
- Life Insurance (2019)
- Ronjona Ami Abar Ashbo (2019)
- Shesta Sundor (2019)
- Tumi Amari (2019)
- Sharthopor (2020)
- A Sweet Love Story (2020)
- Bujh Balika Obujh Balok (2020)
- Protidin (2020)
- Charur Biye (2020)
- Upohar (2020)
- Shuvo Ratri (2023)
- Bhetore Bahire (2024)

== Filmography ==
Year	Film	Director	Story	Screenplay	Notes	Ref.
2023	Punormilone	Yes	Yes	Yes	Released on Chorki	
2024	Booking					

== Music videos ==
- Evabe Chai (Shawon Gaanwala)
- Keu Na Januk (Tahsan)

== Web Content ==
- Networker Baire
- Unish20
- Punormilone
