= Black discography =

Albums and singles released by band Black

- Studio albums: 5
- Compilation albums: 20
- Singles: 21
- Music videos: 9

Black is an alternative rock band which was originally formed in Dhaka, Bangladesh by vocalist Jon Kabir, guitarist Mushfeque Jahan, and drummer Tony Vincent. Black started to gain popularity after they released their first song "Chenna Dukkho" in the 2000 compilation album, Charpotro.

Black then released two more singles from the compilation album Anushilon. In 2002, Black released their debut record titled Amar Prithibi. Between beginning work on the album in the fall of 2001 and its release, they had also released other singles in various compilation albums. After the release of Amar Prithibi, the band began work on their follow-up album, Utshober Por. Notable tracks, including "Utshober Por" (the album's title track) and "Shloak" received frequent radio airplay.

On April 20, 2005, Black was returning home after the completion of a tour in Chittagong when their bus crashed near a ditch on the road. The crash caused the death of Imran Ahmed Choudhury Mobin, a sound engineer in the music industry of Bangladesh and a close friend of the band. Jon, Jahan, and Tahsan suffered minor injuries, while Miraz and Tony had to be hospitalized immediately. The band members announced a hiatus until further notice. Miraz was diagnosed with a permanently damaged patella and had to leave the band indefinitely.

Although the band was inactive for a while, they were still releasing singles through compilation albums. After a five-year break, the band announced their official comeback with the release of their third studio album titled Abar, which was released in 2008. Black released their self-titled fourth studio album on August 21, 2011.

== Studio albums ==
Year	Album
2002	Amar Prithibi: Release: June 10, 2002; Label: G-Series; Format: CD
2003	Utshober Por: Release: December 15, 2003; Label: G-Series; Format: CD
2008	Abar: Release: July 10, 2008; Label: G-Series; Formats: CD, digital download
2011	Black: Release: August 21, 2011; Label: G-Series; Formats: CD, digital download
2016	Unomanush: Release: October 22, 2016; Label: G-Series; Formats: CD, Album

== Compilation albums ==
- 2000: Charpotro
- 2001: Anushilon
- 2002: Projonmo
- 2003: Din Bodol, Agontuk
- 2004: Lokayot, Agontuk 2, Shopnochura, Offbeat (Teleplay Soundtrack)
- 2005: Agontuk 3
- 2006: Shopnochura 2, Underground
- 2007: Shopnochura 3, Live Now
- 2008: Rock 101
- 2009: Rock 202
- 2010: Rock 505
- 2011: Cholo Bangladesh, Rock 606
- 2012: Hatiar

== Singles ==
Year	Title	Album
2000	Chena Dukkho	Charpotro
2001	Sriti	Anushilon
2001	Abinoshshor	Anushilon
2002	Blues & Rodh	Projonmo
2003	Ashirbad (Feat. Artcell, Cryptic Fate)	Din Bodol
2003	Opalop	Agontuk
2004	Shotto	Lokayaot
2004	Daak	Shopnochura
2004	Shokerto Upokul	Agontuk 2
2004	Shey Je Boshe Ache	Offbeat Soundtrack/Shopnochura
2005	The Evening	Agontuk 3
2006	35	Underground
2006	Ondho	Shopnochura 2
2007	Ei Ami	Live Now
2007	E Karonei	Shonochura 3
2008	Shobdo	Rock 101
2009	Tumi Ki Sara Dibe?	Rock 202
2010	Baartho Shawpno	Rock 505
2011	2011	Cholo Bangladesh
2011	Fera	Rock 606
2012	Cheleti	Hatiar
2014	Kar Jonne	Shopnochura 4

== Music videos ==
Year	Title	Director/Videography
2002	"Prathonad"	Tahsan
2002	"Kothay"	Rommo Khan
2002	"Obhiman"	Rommo Khan
2003	"?"	Gazi Ahmed Shubhro
2003	"Utshober Por"	Rubayat
2006	Ondho	Firefly
2006	"35"	Shamim Ahmed
2008	"Abar"	Dogs Day Films
2011	"Ajo..."	Robiul Alam Robi
2016	"Gohine"	Nazmus Shadat Nazim
