= 18th Meril-Prothom Alo Awards =

- Date: 28 April 2016
- Site: Hall of Fame Theatre, Bangabandhu International Conference Center, Dhaka, Bangladesh
- Hosted by: Tahsan Khan

Highlights
- Best Film: Chuye Dile Mon
- Best Actor: Arifin Shuvoo; Chuye Dile Mon
- Best Actress: Zakia Bari Mamo; Chuye Dile Mon
- Lifetime achievement: Kabori

The 18th Meril-Prothom Alo Awards is the 18th edition of the annual awards presented jointly by Square Group and Prothom Alo. The award was given for the year 2015 for his contribution to film, television and music. The award was presented on 28 April 2016, at the Bangabandhu International Conference Center in Dhaka. This program was presented by Tahsan Rahman Khan. This year the Meril-Prothom Alo Lifetime Achievement Award was given to actress Kabori.

== Nominees and winners ==
Below is the list of winners and nominees. Winners' names are listed in bold.

=== Lifetime Achievement Award – 2015 ===
- Kabori

=== Public Choice Awards – 2015 ===
Best Film Actor	Best Film Actress
**Arifin Shuvoo – Chuye Dile Mon**; Mahfuz Ahmed - Zero Degree; Mosharraf Karim - Jalaler Golpo; Shakib Khan - Eito Prem	**Zakia Bari Mamo – Chuye Dile Mon**; Apu Biswas - Love Marriage; Bidya Sinha Saha Mim - Padma Patar Jol; Mahiya Mahi - Romeo vs Juliet
Best TV Actor	Best TV Actress
**Mosharraf Karim – Sikandar Box Ekhon Nij Grame**; Zahid Hasan - Lottery; Tahsan Rahman Khan - Chinigura Prem; Mahfuz Ahmed - Likes and Comments	**Nusrat Imrose Tisha – Tilottoma Tomar Jonyo**; Aupee Karim - E Shohor Madhobilotar Na; Mehzabien Chowdhury - Superstar; Rafiath Rashid Mithila - Sukher Charpotro
Best Singer (Male)	Best Singer (Female)
**Tahsan Khan** **- "Chuye Dile Mon" (Chuye Dile Mon)**	**Nazmun Munira Nancy - "Dana Kata Pori" (Rokto)**; Kanakchapa - "Padmapukur"; Dilshad Nahar Kona - "Ek Jora Chokher Dabi (Ontorongo); Fahmida Nabi - "Ekta Bondhu Chai"
Best Newcomer (Film and TV)	
**Nusraat Faria - Aashiqui**

=== Critics Choice Awards – 2015 ===
Best Film	Best Film Director
**Chuye Dile Mon**	**Morshedul Islam - Anil Bagchir Ekdin**; Animesh Aich - Zero Degree; Shihab Shahin - Chuye Dile Mon
Best Film Actor	Best Film Actress
**Aref Syed- Anil Bagchir Ekdin**	**Zakia Bari Mamo - Chuye Dile Mon**
Best TV Director	Best TV Actor
**Redoan Rony- Jege Othar Golpo**	**Khandaker Lenin - Jege Othar Golpo**
Best TV Actress	**Khandaker Lenin - Jege Othar Golpo**
**Tisha - Shefali**	**Khandaker Lenin - Jege Othar Golpo**
