= Parsha Mahjabeen Purnee =

Bangladeshi singer and actress

- পারশা মাহজাবীন পূর্ণী
- Parsha Mahjabeen Purnee in 2026
- Born: May 25, 2003 (age 23); Bangladesh
- Occupations: Singer; actress; model
- Years active: 2020–present
- Spouse: Asad Noor
- Musical career
- Genres: Pop; folk; acoustic

Parsha Mahjabeen Purnee (Bengali: পারশা মাহজাবীন পূর্ণী) is a Bangladeshi singer-songwriter, lyricist, composer, media personality, and actress. She first gained attention for the song "Cholo Bhule Jai", which she wrote and performed in 2024 during the July Movement. Her acting roles include the Chorki web film Ghumpori (2025). She was a playback singer to the soundtrack of the 2026 film Domm (2026).

== Early life ==
Purnee was born on 25 May 2003 in Bogra, Rajshahi Division, Bangladesh. Her father is originally from Dinajpur. Her mother is a classical singer. Purnee began formal vocal training in her childhood after being scouted by a teacher at a local music academy. During her primary education years, she trained in Rabindra Sangeet at the Jatiya Rabindra Parishad before expanding her focus to contemporary Bengali music.

== Career ==
=== Music ===
In no time I expanded my horizons in other genres and seeing my music being celebrated everywhere, it became more than a passion. It became a connection for me—a gift that blossomed into something deep and meaningful

— Parsha Mahjabeen Purnee, The Business Standard

Purnee began releasing music on YouTube and other platforms prior to 2024, including covers. In 2021, Parsha provided vocals for the television drama Light Camera Action with the duet 'Dujon Here Jai.' She subsequently sang for several other dramas, including Copy Paste, Putuler Shongshar, and Je Prem Eshechhilo.

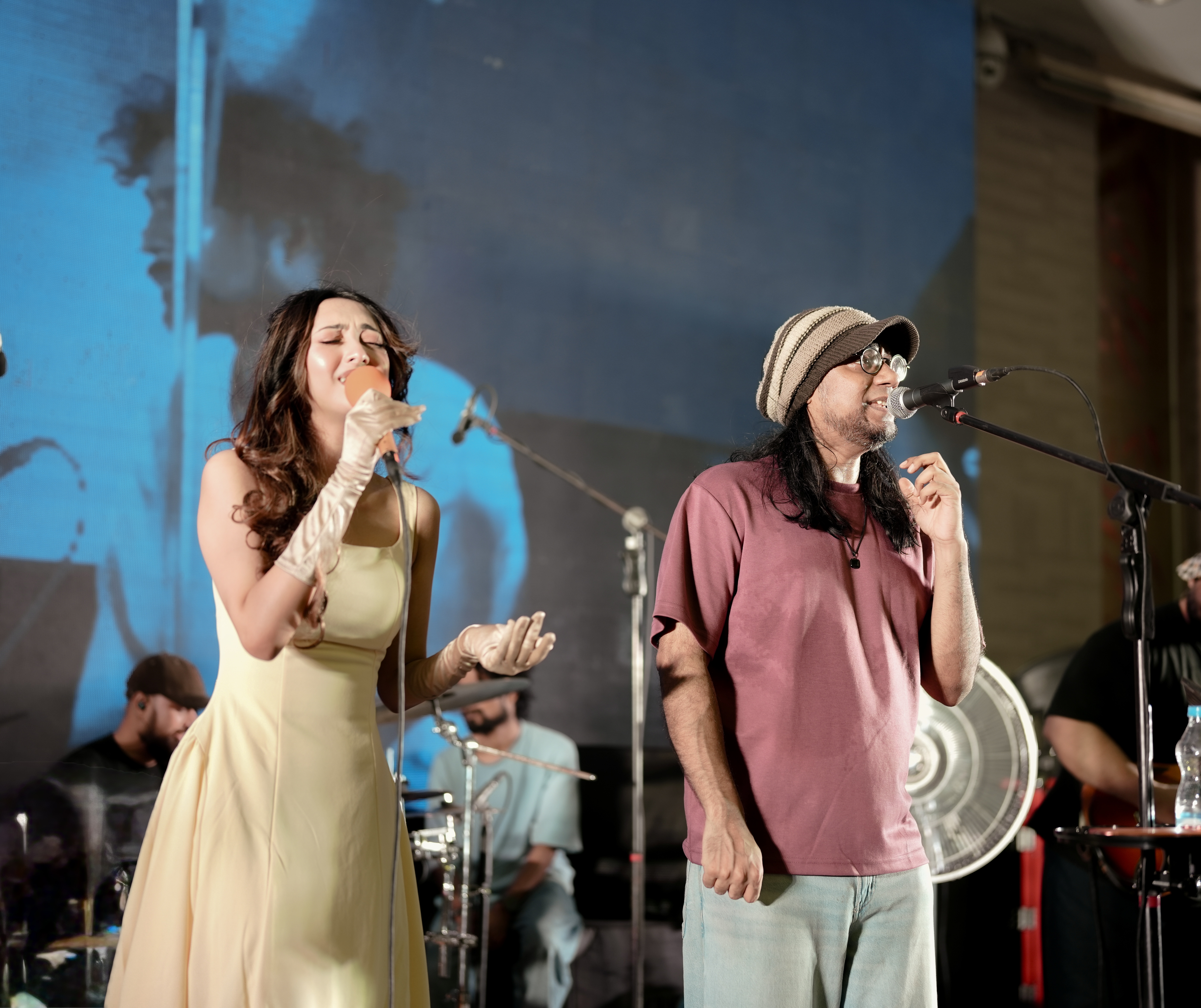
Parsha Mahjabeen Purnee performing alongside AvoidRafa (Raef Al Hasan Rafa) in 2026.

In 2024, during the July Movement, while a third year student at North South University, she wrote and composed "Cholo Bhule Jai" in approximately ten minutes, accompanying herself on the ukulele. She described it as her personal contribution to the movement, expressing frustration over oppression at a time when she was unable to join the protests in person. The song was widely shared and utilized in media related to the movement. She subsequently recorded a studio version of the track, featuring pop-rock instrumentation produced by musician Raef Al Hasan Rafa. The song was later released in unplugged and Prothom Alo anniversary editions.

She has performed as an opening act for events featuring Darshan Raval and represented Bangladesh by singing at UNESCO headquarters in Paris. She performed at the Bengali New Year open-air concert hosted by the Bangladesh Shilpakala Academy in collaboration with the Ministry of Cultural Affairs on 14 April 2025 on Manik Mia Avenue in Dhaka.

In March 2026, she wrote the lyrics, composed the music, and performed (as a duet with Imran Mahmudul) the song "Kothay Pabo Tahare" for the soundtrack of the feature film Domm (directed by Redoan Rony).

Her independent discography includes singles such as "Prothom Premer Gaan" (released in 2024). She has also been featured in live music programs, such as performing "Jodi Tumi Amar Hote" on the RTV Music Lounge.

=== Acting ===
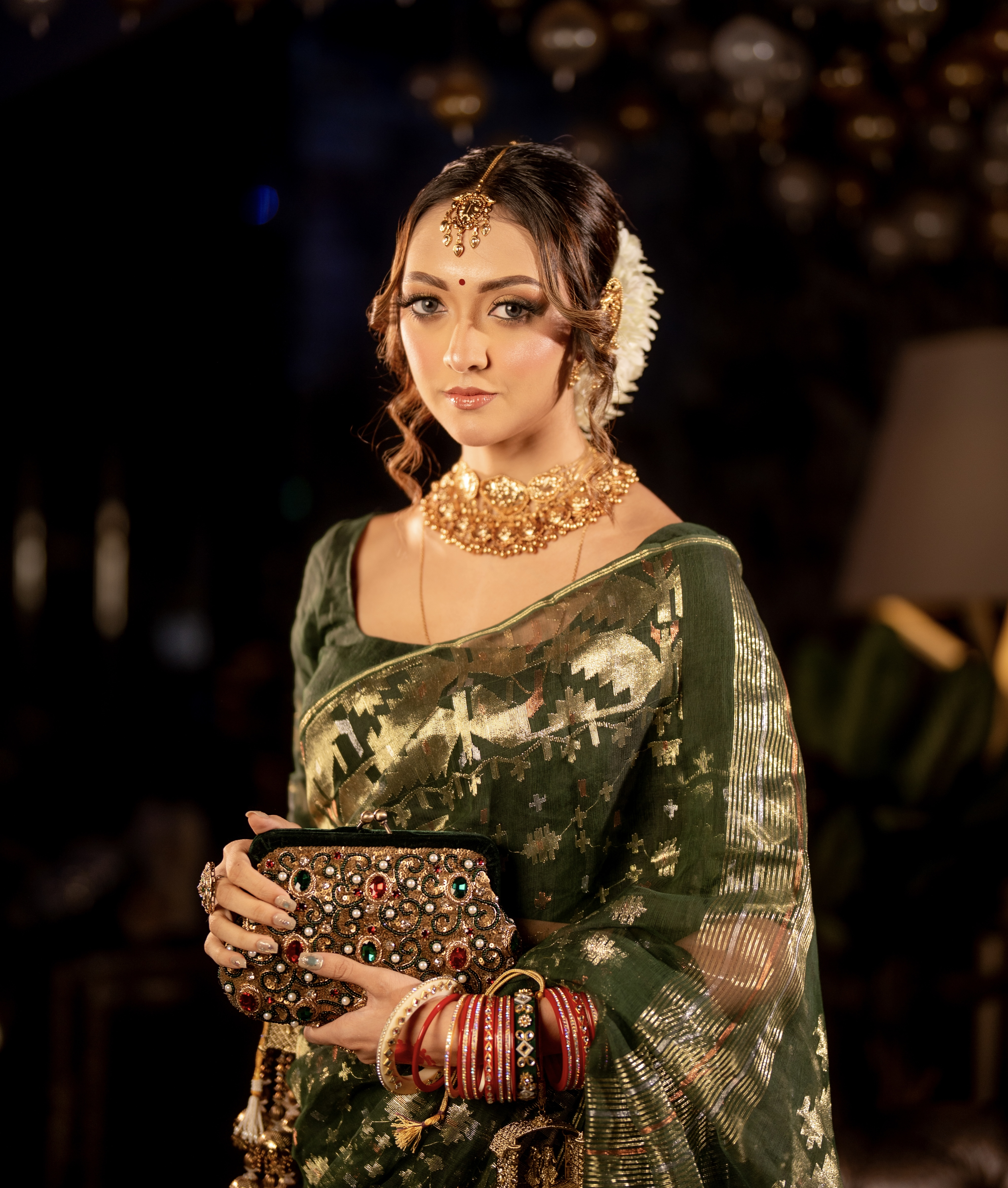
Parsha in 2026 in a modeling event.

Purnee made her acting debut in the 2024 drama Love Line. In 2025, she appeared in the Chorki web film Ghumpori, directed by Jahid Preetom. Purnee's acting was praised, where she played the role of Usha in a story involving a love triangle with characters portrayed by Pritom Hasan and Tanjin Tisha. The same year, Purnee starred in Ek Guchho Kodom, a silent short film directed by Jahid Preetam as part of the Closeup Kache Ashar Golpo anthology series.

=== Modeling ===
In addition to her music and acting career, Purnee models for commercial brands. She has starred in television and online video commercials for brands such as Nescafé and Airtel. In November 2024, she made her magazine cover debut featuring in a winter clothing editorial for Prothom Alo's lifestyle supplement, Naksha. She was also the cover model for Prothom Alo's Barnil Biye magazine, on its debut edition published in December 2024.

== Personal life ==
Parsha Mahjabin's marriage ceremony took place outside Bangladesh on 26 October 2026. She announced her marriage on 7 November by sharing photographs from the ceremony on social media. She said that she had met her husband while travelling abroad about a year earlier. However, she did not disclose his identity. Following widespread online speculation that blogger Asad Noor was her husband, Mahjabin and Noor confirmed the claims on 11 November.

== Works ==
=== Selected filmography ===
| Year | Title | Role | Format | Notes | Ref. |
| 2024 | Love Line | — | Television drama | Acting debut; directed by Probir Roy Chowdhury. Co-starred with Farhan Ahmed Jovan. | |
| 2025 | Ek Guchho Kodom | — | Short film | Silent short film as part of the Closeup Kache Ashar Golpo anthology series; directed by Jahid Preetam. | |
| 2025 | Ghumpori | Usha | Web film | Released on the streaming platform Chorki. | |

=== Selected discography ===
==== Singles & Playback Singing ====
| Year | Title | Co-artist(s) | Album / Project | Notes | Ref. |
| 2021 | "Dujon Here Jai" | Azad Rahi | Light Camera Action | Playback debut for the television drama starring Tahsan and Tanjin Tisha. | |
| 2023 | Various Theme Songs | —N/a | Copy Paste, Putuler Shongshar, Je Prem Eshechhilo | Provided vocals for the official theme/title songs of these respective television dramas. | |
| 2024 | "Prothom Premer Gaan" | Palash Shakil | Single | —N/a | |
| 2024 | "Cholo Bhule Jai" | Solo | Single | Written and composed by Parsha; the studio version was later arranged and produced by Raef Al Hasan Rafa. | |
| 2026 | "Kothay Pabo Tahare" | Imran Mahmudul | Domm (Original Motion Picture Soundtrack) | —N/a | |
