= August 14 (TV series) =

2020 Bangladeshi web series

- Title card
- Bengali: আগস্ট ১৪
- Genre: Crime; Thriller; Drama
- Written by: Shihab Shaheen
- Directed by: Shihab Shaheen
- Starring: See below
- Country of origin: Bangladesh
- Original language: Bengali
- No. of seasons: 1
- No. of episodes: 6

Production
- Producers: Raffael Ahsan; Sayeduzzaman Talukdar; Sadia Afrin
- Production location: Bangladesh
- Editor: Jobayar Abir Peal
- Running time: 30-40 minutes
- Production company: Clapboard Entertainment

Original release
- Network: Binge
- Release: 28 May 2020

August 14 (Bengali: আগস্ট ১৪) is a 2020 Bangladeshi crime thriller streaming television series written & directed by Shihab Shaheen for the online video on demand platform Binge. It features Tasnuva Tisha, Shatabdi Wadud, Shahiduzzaman Selim in lead roles. The series is inspired from a true incident of 2013, when a police officer Mahfuzur Rahman & his wife Swapna Rahman were murdered by their own drug addicted daughter Oishee Rahman at their Chamelibagh resident in Dhaka. It is the first ever real-life crime television series of Bangladesh.

== Cast ==
- Tasnuva Tisha as Tushi Islam:

Drug addicted daughter of police officer Rafiqul Islam and Shanta Islam.

- Shahiduzzaman Selim as Rafiqul Islam:

Police officer.

- Monira Mithu as Shanta Islam:

Wife of police officer Rafiqul Islam.

- Shatabdi Wadud as Khaled:

Investigating Officer (IO) of Rafiqul Islam & Shanta Islam murder case.

- Farhana Endra as Khaled's Wife
- Sayed Zaman Shawon as Jimmy
- Abu Hurayra Tanvir as Rumi
- Uzzal Mahamud as Sattar
- Fakhrul Bashar Masum as SP
- Nur E Alam Nayan as Jashim
- Mashhur Goni Golpo
- Zannat
- Sijat Shimul
- Hindol Roy
- Sazu
- Onuvob

== Episodes ==
No.	Title	Directed by	Original release date
1	"Ondhokarer Din" "Day of Darkness"	Shihab Shaheen	21 May 2020
2	"Tushi Kothay" "Where is Tushi"	Shihab Shaheen	21 May 2020
3	"Dhurto Shoytan" "The Cunning Devil"	Shihab Shaheen	21 May 2020
4	"Kritodasher Kanna" "The Cry Of The Slave"	Shihab Shaheen	21 May 2020
5	"Dancemaster Jimmy" "Dancemaster Jimmy"	Shihab Shaheen	21 May 2020
6	"Ondhokarer Meye" "The Girl Of Darkness"	Shihab Shaheen	21 May 2020

== See also ==
- Mohanagar
- Taqdeer
- Ladies & Gentleman
- Unoloukik
