= Jon Kabir =

Bangladeshi singer, actor, and model

- জন কবির
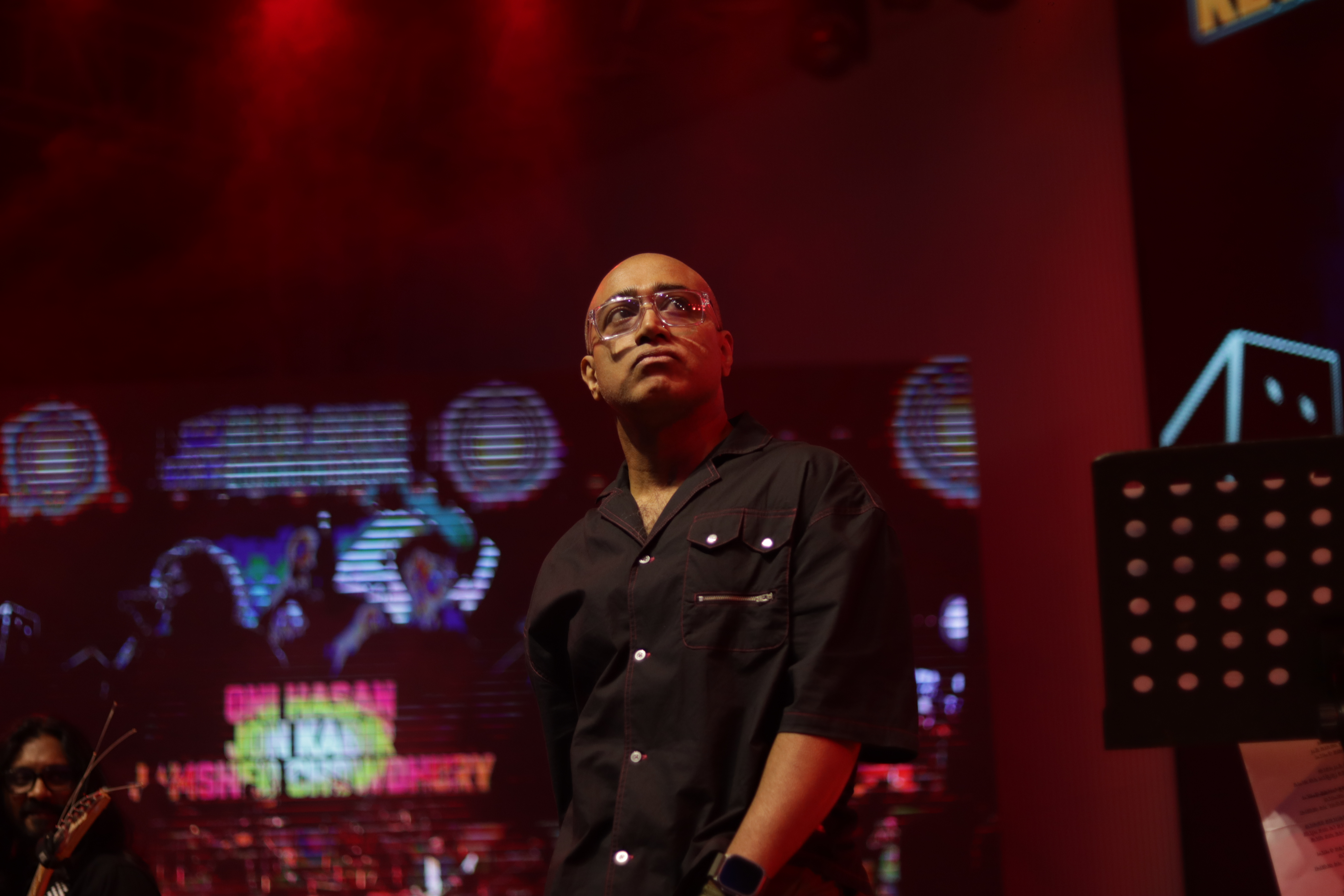
- Jon Kabir in 2024
- Born: Kazi Jahangir Kabir; 10 July 1979 (age 46)
- Education: Willes Little Flower School; North South University
- Occupations: Singer; model; actor
- Years active: 1998–present
- Musical career
- Genres: Grunge; Alternative rock; Hard rock
- Instruments: Guitar; vocals

Kazi Jahangir Kabir (born 10 July 1979), known mononymously as Jon Kabir, is a Bangladeshi singer, composer, actor, and model. Currently he is the lead vocalist of the rock band Indalo. He is the founder and former frontman of the grunge and alternative rock band Black. After the reunion concert with his former band in Bangladesh around May 2024, Jon Kabir moved to the United States but he is still active musically as a solo artist while often collaborating with local NYC scene musicians according to his social media.

== Life and career ==
=== Black (1997–2011) ===
In the late 1990s, Jon and two of his friends Mushfeque Jahan and Tony Vincent who attended Willes Little Flower School and Adamjee Cantonment College, started to jam at each other's houses. They would listen to music through cassettes of bands like Pearl Jam, Stone Temple Pilots and Soundgarden who were later influences in their music. In 1997 Jon co-founded Black with Jahan on guitars, Tony on drums and Jon himself on vocals. Later on countless other members joined like Asif Haque and Tahsan Khan. Together they went on to release 4 studio albums but Kabir rose in prominence after the band's debut album, Amar Prithibi. In 2011, Jon wanted to take a break from music but his other band members didn't, fearing that it might affect financial factors of the band. Jon then left the band after their conflict of interest to take a break from music indefinitely.

=== Indalo (2012–present) ===
After leaving Black, he started to explore music, going to concerts and shows in other countries. He then started to jam with an old friend of his, Hossain. They had similar music taste and would cover their favorite songs. In 2012, Kabir co-founded the rock band Indalo with Bart Nandit Areng, Zubair, and Dio Haque. The band's debut album, Kokhon Kibhabe Ekhane Ke Jane, was released in 2015 with hit tracks such as ISD.

Kabir later started acting following an offer from Afsana Mimi. Suborna Mustafa and Humayun Faridi also helped to launch his acting career. However, he has not taken up any acting roles for the past 7 years. He states in an interview that he refuses to act in the same cliche roles but something more intriguing, preferably a cameo.

In 2020, Jon started his own podcast on YouTube called 'I started a Podcast,' where he interviews famous individuals who are experts in their respective fields who share their work and talk about the impact of music in their lives.

When asked about a reunion with his former band Black, in an interview, he said that if he ever does it, it will only be for money and nothing else.

As a result on May 10, 2024 The reunion concert (one night only) took place in Dhaka, Bangladesh with the original line-up of the members of Black.

== Discography ==
=== Black ===
- "আমার পৃথিবী (Amar Prithibi)" (2002)
- "উৎসবের পর (Utshober Por)" (2003)
- "আবার (Abar)" (2008)
- "Black" (2011)

=== Indalo ===
==== Albums ====
- Kokhon Kibhabe Ekhane Ke Jane (2015)

==== EPs ====
- Notun Khaame Purono Chithi (2021)

==== Singles ====
- Hobeki? (2018)
- Chhobi (2018)
- Kokhon Kibhabe Ekhane Ke Jane (2021)
