= Ghumpori =

2025 Bangladeshi romance film

- Directed by: Jahid Preetom
- Written by: Jahid Preetom
- Starring: Pritom Hasan; Tanjin Tisha; Parsha Mahjabeen Purnee
- Release date: 2025
- Running time: 113 minutes
- Country: Bangladesh
- Language: Bengali

Ghumpori (Bengali: ঘুমপরী) is a 2025 Bangladeshi romantic drama web film directed and written by Jahid Preetom. Produced as a Chorki Original Film (in association with Alpha-i), it was released on 20 February 2025 on the Bangladeshi OTT platform Chorki. The film stars Pritom Hasan, Tanjin Tisha, and Parsha Mahjabeen Purnee.

The story follows intern doctor Usha, who reunites with her former tutor and love interest Megh after five years. Megh has built an idealized family life in a hospital cabin with Jyoti, who is in a coma. Told from the perspectives of the three leads, the film explores themes of love, longing, anticipation, and unrequited affection. It is inspired by Humayun Ahmed's novel Opekkha.

== Cast ==
- Pritom Hasan as Megh
- Tanjin Tisha as Jyoti
- Parsha Mahjabeen Purnee as Usha
