= Indalo (band) =

Bangladeshi rock band

Indalo ইন্ডালো
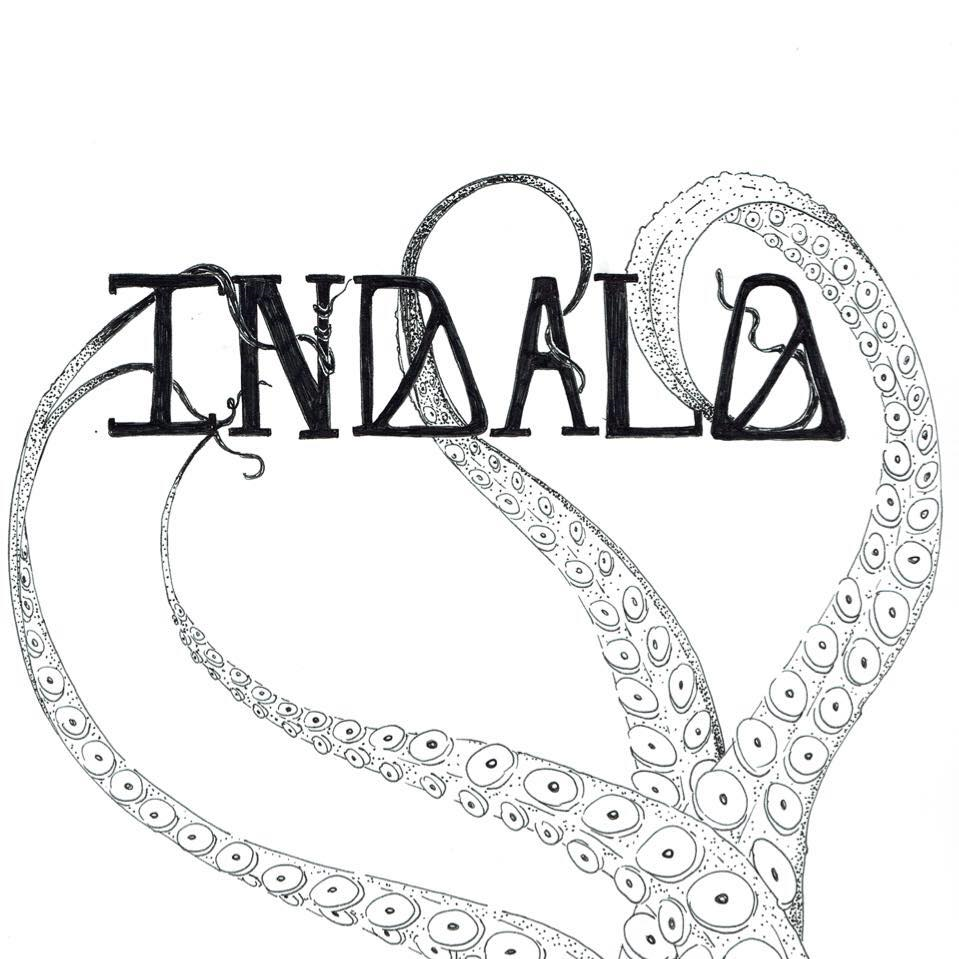

Background information
- Origin: Bangladesh
- Genres: Rock, psychedelic rock
- Years active: 2012–present
- Label: Mushroom Entertainment Inc.
- Members: Jon Kabir; Zubair Hasan; Bart Nandit Areng; Mubarak Milon
- Past members: Ahsan Titu; Dio Haque; Quazi Farhan

Indalo is a Bangladeshi soft rock band formed in 2012 by Zubair Hasan, Jon Kabir, Dio Haque and Ahsan Titu.

== Members ==
Indalo was formed by vocalist and guitarist Jon Kabir from Black, guitarist and vocalist Zubair Hasan from Aashor, bassist Ahsan Titu from Aashor and Black, and drummer Dio Haque from Nemesis.

Titu left the band after recording their first single, "ISD", with them. He was replaced by Bart Nandit Areng. After a sudden heart attack and a stroke, Dio Haque took a break from playing drums. Haque was the primary drummer of Nemesis and stopped playing drums professionally. Mubarak Milon was the drummer and played drums on "Miththa". Later Quazi Farhan replaced him and was playing drums with them as the fourth member. Farhan left the band after finishing recording their second album “Uttor Khujchi Dokkhine” (unreleased) and Milon was back to take over the role of their drummer once again.

== History ==
After leaving Black, Jon Kabir would visit jamming sessions with Aashor, where Zubair and Titu would be jamming together. Titu was an active member of Black at the time and Zubair came out of a roughly four-year hiatus. Three of them decided to jam together and found Dio as the drummer. This soon became Indalo, and they wrote their first single, "ISD" as a new band. They first appeared before an audience on 10 November 2012, and rocked the curious new audience who attended the concert. At that event they performed "ISD" for the first time.

"ISD" was recorded and released in 2013. It became a massive hit and is still one of their major hits. The song was also one of the 13 tracks on Kokhon Kibhabe Ekhane Ke Jane, their first album, which was released in 2015. "ISD" was recorded with Titu on bass; Areng played bass on the remainder of the album.

In concerts they have frequently played their own material as well as covers of international rock bands such as Soundgarden, Radiohead, Alice in Chains, Stone Temple Pilots, Pearl Jam and many others. They arranged many successful tribute concerts in the local underground concert scene.

In 2017, they released the single "Chhobi" under the record label Gaanchill Music. The song came with a big-budget music video shot at Bandarban, directed by the national award-winning director, Taneem Rahman Aungshu. In 2018 they released another single, "Hobeki?", which had elements of grunge, psychedelia and alternative rock in an extraordinary format far from the conventional verses and choruses. The track features Zubair's unconventional guitar tones and elements, Kabir's powerful falsetto and belting, Haque's "other" persona as a drummer, and Areng's powerful bass. This track sealed the band as unpredictable, loved by their niche but faithful fans. Although they released the audio first, later they released the music video for the song.

In 2019, they released the first single, "1996", from their much awaited EP, Notun Khaame Purono Chithi. The concept of the EP was to rediscover and remake old bengali songs and pay homage to the local music that the members grew up listening to. "1996" is a mashup of the legends of LRB's "Kichu Chaibona" and Ark's "Sweety", both of which were released in 1996. This single became a huge hit after the release, and with millions of views on YouTube, thousands of plays on Spotify the band reached a wider audience. "Miththa" was the second release from the EP. "1996" was the last released track where Dio played drums with the band. Dio Haque later left the band due to his health problems. Mubarak Milon from the band Banglamotorr played drums on "Miththa", which is an original Black song. The song took a new shape and sound welcomed and enjoyed by the fans. The music video of "Miththa" is basically a prequel to the "1996" video. The third release from the EP, "Nei Proyojon", is originally by the heavy metal/progressive rock band Warfaze. The new rendition is a sludgy, grunge track played on acoustic instruments that has an unavoidable Indalo sound to it.

They soon announced the name of their second album, Uttor Khujchi Dokkhine, and released the single "Kokhon Kibhabe Ekhane Ke Jane" from the upcoming album on September 24, 2021. Both the song and the music video received an excellent response from the fans, who welcomed the new direction in the sound designing of the evolving band. Quazi Farhan debuted as the drummer with this track but he also had to leave the band a few years later due to personal reasons.

Currently vocalist Jon Kabir is away from Bangladesh and living in the United States. But the band is actively working on their second studio album.

== Discography ==
Studio albums

- Kokhon Kibhabe Ekhane Ke Jane (debut album, 2015)

Singles

- "Chhobi" (single, Nov, 2017)
- "Hobeki" (single, Aug, 2018)
- "1996" (single, Jun, 2019)
- "Miththa" (single, August, 2019)
- "Nei Proyojon" (single, Jun, 2020)
- "Kokhon Kibhabe Ekhane Ke Jane" (single, Sept 24, 2021)
- "Ekanto Golap" (single, April 13, 2024)
- "Ghuri" (single, Oct 17, 2024)

EP

- Notun Khaame Purono Chithi (April 9, 2021)

== Members ==
Present members

- Jon Kabir - lead vocals, rhythm guitar (2012–present)
- Zubair Hasan - lead guitar, backing vocals (2012–present)
- Bart Nandit Areng - bass (2013–present)
- Quazi Farhan - drums (2021–present)

Past members

- Rafiqul Ahsan Titu - bass (2012–2013)
- Dio Haque - drums (2012–2019)
- Mubarak Hossain Milon - drums (2019–2020)
