= Nizam Uddin Chowdhury =

Bangladeshi cricket administrator

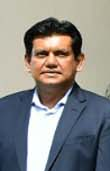
- Nizam in 2024

Chief Executive Officer of the Bangladesh Cricket Board
- Incumbent
- Assumed office 27 August 2014

Personal details
- Born: January 4, 1972 (age 54) Barishal, Bangladesh

Nizam Uddin Chowdhury (born 4 January 1972) is a Bangladeshi cricket administrator and the chief executive officer of the Bangladesh Cricket Board. A key figure in cricket in Bangladesh, he has been involved with the national cricket board since 2000 in various capacities.

== Early life ==
Chowdhury was born on 4 January 1972 in Barisal District, Bangladesh. He studied at Willes Little Flower School. He earned a master's degree in management in 1992.

== Career ==
Chowdhury has been a member of the International Cricket Council Chief Executive's Committee from 2008 to 2010, and the Asian Cricket Council Executive Board from 2008 to 2010 and 2012 to 2014.

In 2008, Chowdhury was the acting chief executive officer of the Bangladesh Cricket Board. He served as the acting chief executive officer till August 2010. He was then appointed general manager of the board. He was re-appointed acting chief executive officer of the Bangladesh Cricket Board in 2010 after the death of Manzur Ahmed.

Chowdhury has played a central role in organising major international cricket tournaments in Bangladesh, including the ICC Cricket World Cup 2011, the ICC World Twenty20 2014, the ICC Under-19 Cricket World Cup in 2004 and 2016, and multiple Asia Cup events. On 27 August 2014, Chowdhury was appointed chief executive officer of the Bangladesh Cricket Board. In 2019, he had to solve a strike by players. He severed all ties of the board with Shaheed Chandu Stadium in Bogura following differences with the Bogura District Sports Association. The Awami League government provided him with a plot in Jhilmil Residential Project.

After the fall of the Sheikh Hasina led Awami League government, Chowdhury accepted the resignation of Nazmul Hassan, President of the Bangladesh Cricket Board and aligned with the former prime minister, who was replaced by Faruque Ahmed. He attended a briefing with a team of the Anti-Corruption Commission which raided the Bangladesh Cricket Board in April 2025.

== Personal life ==
Chowdhury is married to Farida Rahman Chowdhury and has three children.
