= Kache Ashar Golpo =

- Season Three Promotional Poster
- Genre: Romance
- Created by: Unilever Bangladesh Limited
- Country of origin: Bangladesh
- Original language: Bengali
- No. of seasons: 11
- No. of episodes: 33

Production
- Production location: Bangladesh
- Production company: Unilever Bangladesh Limited

Original release
- Network: NTV (Season 1); Banglavision
- Release: 2011 – present

Kache Ashar Golpo (Story of coming closer) is anthology series of telefilms promoted as a "collection of brave and unusual love stories" which premiered in January 2011 on NTV. The series airs multiple episodes only during special holidays such as Valentine's Day and Eid and features many actors including Tahsan Rahman Khan, Jon Kabir, Nusrat Imrose Tisha, Rafiath Rashid Mithila, Safa Kabir, Afran Nisho .

== Episodes ==
=== Season 1 (2011) ===
No.	Title	Directed by	Written by	Original release date
1	TBA	TBA	TBA	TBA
2	TBA	TBA	TBA	TBA
3	TBA	TBA	TBA	TBA

=== Season 2 (2014) ===
No.	Title	Directed by	Written by	Original release date
4	"Kotha Bondhu Mithila"	Masud Hasan	Sakhawat Hossain	14 February 2014
5	"Otoppor"	Shafayet Mansoor	Anisul Haq	14 February 2014
6	"Why so serious?"	Ashfaq Nipun	Khandakar Nawshad Rahman	14 February 2014

=== Season 3 (2015) ===
No.	Title	Directed by	Written by	Original release date
7	"Chinigura Prem"	Gulam Kibria Farooki	Riazul Alam	14 February 2015
8	"Protikkha"	Imraul Rafat	Hridita Islam	14 February 2015
9	"Ami Akash Pathabo"	Shafayet Mansoor	Mehreen Kabir	14 February 2015

=== Season 4 (2016) ===
No.	Title	Directed by	Written by	Original release date
10	"Shoto Danar Projapoti"	Mabrur Rashid Bannah	Shihab-Ar-Rashid	14 February 2016
11	"Pencile e Aaka Bhalobasha"	Rubayet Mahmud	Shakil Ahmed Rishan	14 February 2016
12	"Hat ta Bariye Daw"	Shafayet Mansoor Rana	Afsana Kashem Mimi	14 February 2016

=== Season 5 (2017) ===
No.	Title	Directed by	Written by	Original release date
13	"Tomar Pichu Pichu"	Mabrur Rashid Bannah	Monsur Ahmed	14 February 2017
14	"Keo Jane Na"	R B Pritom	Atia Onuli	14 February 2017
15	"Megh Enechi Veja"	Rubayet Mahmud	Tarikul Islam Topu	14 February 2017

=== Season 6 (2018) ===
No.	Title	Directed by	Written by	Original release date
16	"Tobuo Bhalobashi"	Rubayet Mahmud	AKM Mahfujul Alam Anick	14 February 2018
17	"Ami Tomar Golpo Hobo"	Mabrur Rashid Bannah	Md Khayrul Hassan	14 February 2018
18	"Shohore Notun Gaan"	Shafayet Mansoor Rana	Md Rafikul Islam	14 February 2018

=== Season 7 (2019) ===
No.	Title	Directed by	Written by	Original release date
19	"Chondo Chara Gaan"	Shakeeb Fahad	Samiur Rashid	14 February 2019
20	"Je Jekhane Dariye"	Mabrur Rashid Bannah	Rahima Haossain Beauty	14 February 2019
21	"Ei Golper Nam Nei"	Anam Biswas	Sanjay Dhar	14 February 2019

=== Season 8 (2020) ===
No.	Title	Directed by	Written by	Original release date
22	"Tomar pashe haat te dio"	Anam Biswas	Sehjan Mahmud	14 February 2020
23	"Tomar kachei jabo"	Tanvir Ahsan	Zarine Tasnim Medha	14 February 2020
24	"Shesta shobai jane"	Nuhash Humayun	Shahnewaz Mithu	14 February 2020

=== Season 9 (2021) ===
No.	Title	Directed by	Written by	Original release date
25	"Athoba Pramer Golpo"	Rayhan Rafi	Shanawaz Badhon	14 February 2021
26	"Akdin Brishtir Bekale"	Anom Biswash	Abdullah R Rafi	14 February 2021
27	"Sunno Theke Suru"	Sankh Das Gupta	Rejaus Salam Nur	14 February 2021

=== Season 10 (2022) ===
No.	Title	Directed by	Written by	Original release date
28	"Nice To Meet You"	Rasel Sikder	Atia Ibnat Nova	14 February 2022
29	"Fagun Thakhe Fagune"	Amitabh Reza	Injamul Huq	14 February 2022
30	"Ar Thakho Na Dure"	Raka Noshin Nower	Nadim Mahmud Shotej	14 February 2022

=== Season 11 (2023) ===
No.	Title	Directed by	Written by	Original release date
31	"Take Off"	Amitabh Reza Chowdhury	Amitabh Reza Chowdhury	14 February 2023
32	"Shomoy Shob Jane"	Shakeeb Fahad	Moumita Hussain	14 February 2023
33	"Ekta Tumi Lagbe"	Raka Noshin Nower	Raka Noshin Nower	14 February 2023

== Reception ==
Shams Rashid Tonmoy, writing for The Daily Star, gave season five episode "Tomar Pichu Pichu" a rating of 8/10, praising the performances of Tahsan Rahman Khan and Bidya Sinha Saha Mim, and the story, although "the romantic buildup seemed a bit forced in the end".

Among the episodes of season six, Shams Rashid Tonmoy singled out "Shohore Notun Gaan" for being "an original story that provided a welcome change of pace" because it "uses love as a positive means of breaking [the] stigma" of the handicapped, rather than following the tired formula of "love despite obstacles".
