= Family Feud Bangladesh =

Bangladeshi television game show

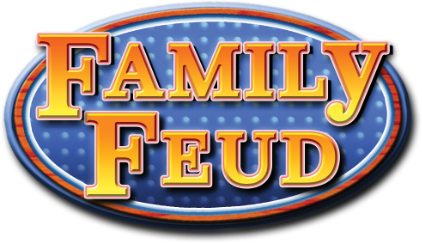
- Bengali: ফ্যামিলি ফিউড বাংলাদেশ
- Genre: Game show
- Created by: Mark Goodson
- Directed by: Wahidul Islam Shuvro
- Presented by: Tahsan Rahman Khan
- Theme music composer: Ash Alexander; Simon Darlow
- Country of origin: Bangladesh
- Original language: Bengali
- No. of seasons: 2
- No. of episodes: 42

Production
- Running time: 40 minutes
- Production company: Bongo

Original release
- Network: NTV
- Release: 27 January 2025 – present

Related
- Family Feud; Family Fortunes

Family Feud Bangladesh is the Bangladeshi version of the American game show Family Feud, marking its presence as the 76th international version of the franchise. The show is hosted by the musician Tahsan Rahman Khan and is produced by Bongo. On May 11 2024, it was announced that a Bengali version would air on NTV, produced by Bongo, starting on 27 January 2025. Stylistically, the show follows the format and style of the US version, as well as using the soundtrack of the British version, All-Star Family Fortunes, from 2006 to 2015.

== Broadcast Details ==
=== Episodes, platforms, and production team ===
The inaugural season comprises 24 episodes, featuring 48 families competing across the run of the show. During Season 1, the show distributed over Tk 3 million in prizes to competing families.

A second season was announced by Bongo following the success of the first season, with production beginning in December 2025. For Season 2, the survey questions were sourced from all 64 districts of Bangladesh.

NTV airs the show every Monday at 9:30 PM, with reruns on for Season 1 on Tuesdays and Season 2 on Wednesdays at 1:00 PM.

Available for free streaming on the Bongo app and website, offering free access to Bangla-speaking audiences.

Production team members include Ahad M Bhai, Rafee Shabbir, Nabila Sajjad, and Ibrahim Mohammad.

== Viewership and Reception ==
By the conclusion of Season 1, Family Feud Bangladesh had accumulated over one billion views across platforms.
