= Chuye Dile Mon =

- Theatrical Poster
- Directed by: Shihab Shaheen
- Written by: Shihab Shaheen
- Produced by: Asiatic Ddhoni-Chitra Limited; Monforing Limited
- Starring: Arifin Shuvoo; Zakia Bari Momo; Iresh Zaker; Misha Sawdagor; Sushoma Sarkar; Ali Raj
- Edited by: Raqib Rana
- Music by: Habib Wahid; Sajid Sarkar
- Production company: Asiatic Ddhoni-Chitra Limited
- Distributed by: Asiatic Ddhoni-Chitra Limited
- Release date: 10 April 2015
- Country: Bangladesh
- Language: Bengali

Chuye Dile Mon (Bengali: ছুঁয়ে দিলে মন) is a 2015 Bangladeshi romantic film, produced by Asiatic Ddhoni-Chitra Limited & Monforing Limited. The film is directed by Shihab Shaheen and features a cast that includes Arifin Shuvoo and Zakia Bari Momo in lead roles while Iresh Zaker and Misha Sawdagor play pivotal supporting role.

Chuye Dile Mon is a childhood love story which takes place in Hridoypur and how two lovers grew apart as they grow up. Chuye Dile Mon was released in Bangladesh on 10 April 2015, as the producers planned to release the film overseas later. It was later announced that the film would be releasing in North America on 9 May 2015.

== Synopsis ==
The story is of two lovers who grew close but got divided by the society. Abir Hasan (Arifin Shuvo) and Nila Khan (Zakia Bari Momo) love each other. Growing up in a conservative family, Nila hesitates to express her feelings to her parents while Abir's family is very moderate. Abir decides to talk to Nila's father about their relationship and wants to marry Nila. However, Nila's father reacts angrily and decides to manipulate Abir and later humiliates them and forces Abir's family to leave the county. Abir settles in Dhaka. Years Later, Still madly in love with Nila, Abir comes back to Hridoypur to regain the respect and win back Nila from her family.

== Cast ==
- Arifin Shuvoo as Abir Hasan
- Zakia Bari Momo as Nila Khan
- Iresh Zaker as Danny
- Misha Sawdagor as Abir's brother-in-law
- Sushoma Sarkar as Abir's sister
- Ali Raj as Afzal Khan, Nila's father
- Mahamudul Islam Mithu as Ashfaq Khan, Nila's uncle and Danny's father
- Khaledur Rahman Khan Anando as Pavel, Abir's friend
- Quazi Nawshaba Ahmed as Abonti, Special Appearance
- Khalequzzaman
- Sabiha Zaman
- Kazi Uzzal
- Airin Adhikari
- Danger Zahid
- Mezbah Uddin Sumon

== Production ==
=== Marketing ===
The first soundtrack of Chuye Dile Mon was released on market on 1 November 2014. Second Track was released on 17 November 2014. The tracks of the films were sung by Tahsan Rahman Khan and Habib Wahid. On 1 November 2014, Pepsi and Ekhanei.com joined the film as sponsor and marketing partner alongside Microsoft and Unilever Bangladesh. Radio Foorti has since been the radio partner for film's soundtrack and radio promotions. Director Shihab Shaheen has confirmed that the film is slated to release on 10 April 2015.

=== Development ===
Asiatic Ddhoni-Chitra Limited was supposed to distribute the film on 29 January 2015 in Bangladesh, However, due to Cricket World Cup inauguration on the same date, the release date was pushed back to 10 April 2015. Distributors have expressed their plan to release the film overseas. On 1 January 2015, Chuye Dile Mon received uncut release certificate from the censor board.

=== Filming ===
Filming of Chuye Dile Mon began in Chhatak during early 2014. A Portion of the film was shot on Dhaka until the climax scene, which was shot is Chhatak. The scenes of the film was shot in the rural part of the country to give the film a fresh, greenery look.

== Release ==
Chuye Dile Mon was released on 43 screens around Bangladesh on 10 April 2015. Although the film has a potential to be released in much wider market, the producers have expressed their intention to release the film in few selected screens for the first week to eliminate the risk of piracy. The film was released on the biggest theaters in the country including Bashundhara Cineplex, Blockbuster Cinema, Balaka Cineworld and Shyamoli Cinema. According to sources, the film's screening will be boosted to over 100 theaters by second week. Upon release, director Shihab Shaheen and Arifin Shuvoo confirmed that the film will be released in North America, UK, and Australia during late 2015. The film was released in United States on 9 May 2015 and in Australia on 26 May 2015.

== Soundtrack ==
Soundtrack Album for Chuye Dile Mon consists of 5 tracks, composed by Sajid Sarkar & Habib Wahid [Bhalobasha Dao]. The title track was sung by Tahsan Rahman Khan and second track titled Bhalobasha Dao was sung by Habib Wahid. The full album was released on 28 November 2014 by Girona Music. Title Track, Chuye Dile Mon's video clip was released on 30 December 2014.

Chuye Dile Mon

Soundtrack album by Tahsan, Habib Wahid
- Released: 28 November 2014
- Recorded: 2014
- Genre: Feature film soundtrack
- Label: Girona Music
- Director: Sajid Sarkar

No.	Title	Artist	Length
1.	"Chuye Dile Mon"	Tahsan, Shakila Saki	3:20
2.	"Bhalobasha Dao"	Habib Wahid	2:16
3.	"Shunno Theke"	Imran, Kona
4.	"Chuye Dilam"	Nirjo Habib
5.	"Chinina"	Shawon Gaanwala
6.	"Chole Jao"	Shakila Saki, Shawon Gaanwala

=== Soundtrack reception ===
The title track Chuye Dile Mon was released on 30 December 2014. The track was well received by the audiences and critics. The track received over 1 million hits on YouTube. The second track of the film Shunno Theke was released on 16 March 2015. The track, influenced by the music of Chittagong Hill Tracts, received very favorable response. The track received over 400,000 hits on YouTube within month of its release. The complete music album was favored well by both critics and audiences as one of the best film soundtrack album in recent years.

== See also ==
- List of Bangladeshi films of 2015
