= Asad Noor =

Bangladeshi blogger and human rights activist

- আসাদ নূর
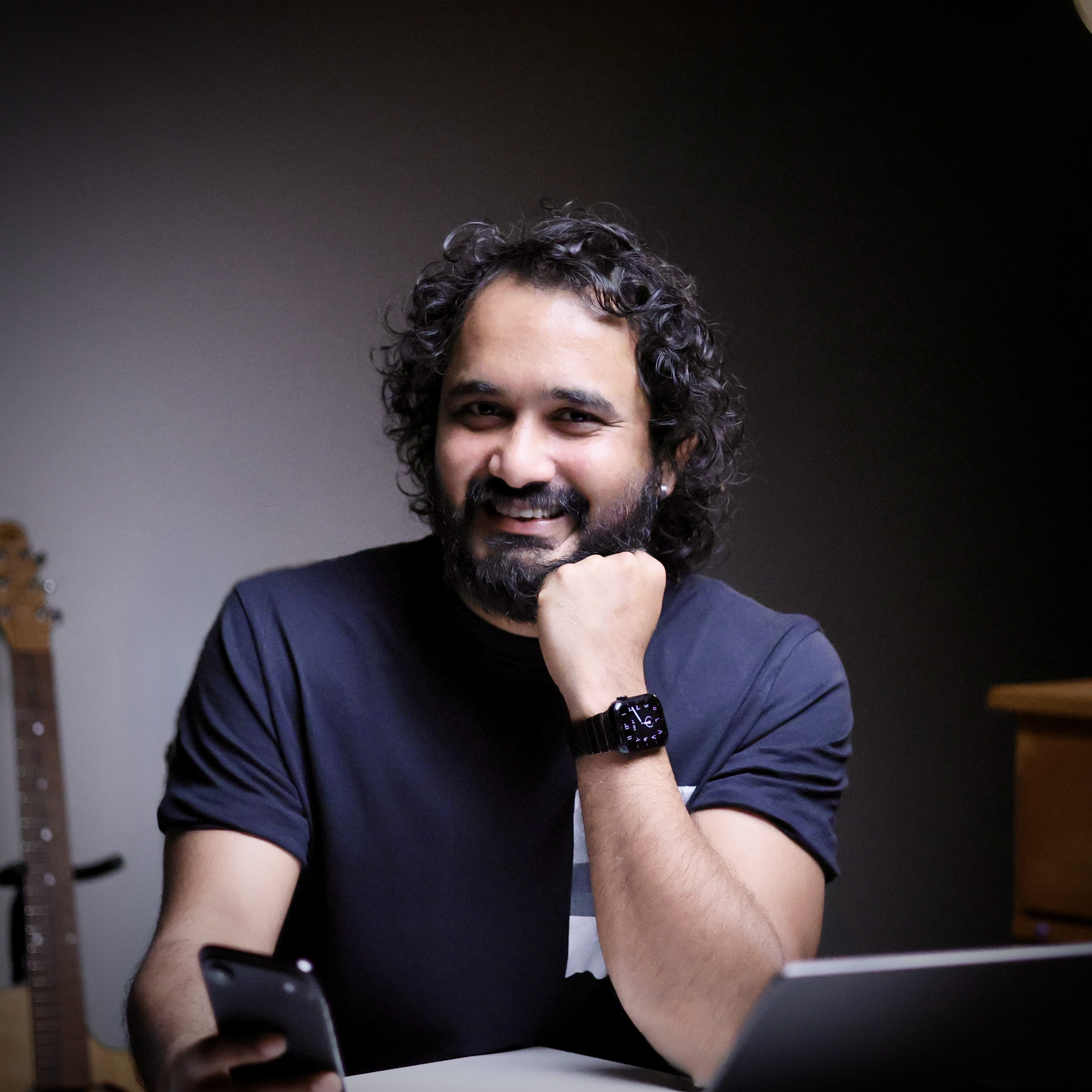
- Noor in 2025
- Born: Asaduzzaman Noor; Gopalganj District, Bangladesh
- Occupations: Blogger, Human rights defender
- Spouse: Parsha Mahjabeen Purnee

Asaduzzaman Noor (Bengali: আসাদ নূর), better known as Asad Noor, is Bangladeshi blogger and human rights activist. An advocate for freedom of expression, secularism and LGBTQ rights, Noor is known for his online commentary criticizing religious fundamentalism and detailing human rights abuses within Bangladesh.

Following his participation in the 2013 Shahbag protests, Noor became a frequent target of radical Islamist groups. Facing ongoing threats, intimidation, and legal charges, Noor left Bangladesh and has lived abroad since 2019.

== Activism ==
Noor began his activism by writing for various blogs and social networks in 2013. Following his involvement with the 2013 Shahbag protests, he became a target for religious fundamentalists. Since 2015, he has been subjected to death threats and intimidation by state and non-state actors for his human rights work. Noor's social media profiles have been subject to targeted cyber-attacks.

In July 2020, Noor published several video blogs condemning the intimidation of the minority Buddhist community in Rangunia Upazila of Chittagong District. Consequently, a local Awami League leader filed a lawsuit against Noor on 14 July 2020 under the Digital Security Act, on charges of "hurting religious sentiments" and "running propaganda against the spirit of the liberation war".

One of Noor's video blogs depicted apparent vandalism of an under-construction statue at a Buddhist monastery in Rangunia. Noor claimed the attackers were backed by forest officials and the local Awami League Member of Parliament (MP), alleging they conspired to banish the monks from the area. Following the release of Noor's videos, local Islamic groups protested against the blogger and accused him of undermining religious harmony between Muslims and Buddhists.

At the 58th session of the United Nations Human Rights Council, Asad Noor expressed concerns about the situation of religious and belief minorities in Bangladesh, citing an increase in attacks following the 2024 protests. He referred to past incidents involving secular bloggers and publishers and mentioned his own experience of leaving Bangladesh due to legal issues and security concerns. Noor also commented on the Constitutional Reform Committee's recommendation to retain Islam as the state religion, suggesting that such measures could affect minority communities. He emphasized the importance of separating religion and state to uphold human rights.

=== Legal issues ===
Noor has been subject to multiple prosecution and detention by the Bangladesh authorities.

=== Legal issues ===
On 25 December 2017, Noor was arrested by immigration police at Shahjalal International Airport while trying to travel to Nepal, and was later sent to jail.

Noor spent eight months in prison in 2018. Upon his release on bail in August, he faced protests from the radical Islamist group Hefazat-e-Islam Bangladesh, which demanded his execution. Noor was later arrested for alleged involvement in a drug trafficking case, which he claims is a fabrication.

Karin Deutsch Karlekar, Director of Free Expression at Risk Programs at PEN America, said: "The arrest and detention of Asad Noor reflects the extremely precarious position of independent voices in Bangladesh." Karlekar also added: "Bloggers like Noor live in fear of physical attack or even murder from extremist groups on the one hand, and then face persecution from their government—which should be acting to protect them—on the other. We ask Bangladeshi officials to release and drop the charges against Asad Noor, to take robust measures to protect him from extremist violence, and in addition, to protect, rather than prosecute, free expression."

Daniel Bastard, head of RSF Reporters without Borders Asia-Pacific, stated: "We call for the charges against Asad Noor to be dismissed because his only crime has been to express secular opinions," and added: "The legal article under which he is accused has for too long been used by extremist religious groups to gag all independent voices. And, in view of the calls for his death, the authorities must provide him with specific protective measures."

In early 2019, Noor was granted bail for the second time. Fearing for his safety, Noor secretly fled Bangladesh in February. He has been living abroad ever since, continuing his online activism on Facebook and YouTube.

=== Harassment of family members ===
On 18 July 2020, plainclothes police officers detained six of Noor's family members in his hometown of Amtali in Barguna. They were taken to Amtali police station, where his father was forced to call Noor and ask him to remove all video posts from his Facebook page, leading international human rights organizations, including Human Rights Watch, Amnesty International, Asian Human Rights Commission, and Robert F. Kennedy Human Rights, to raise concerns about the incident.

Sultan Mohammed Zakaria, a researcher on South Asia at Amnesty International, stated that "the harassment of Asad's family is not an isolated incident. It is part of a worrying pattern targeting families of human rights defenders in exile," adding: "The harassment of families, to muzzle human rights defenders in exile from Bangladesh, is utterly reprehensible. Such tactics of intimidation must be stopped immediately."

UN Special Rapporteur on Freedom of Religion or Belief Ahmed Shaheed said: "We express grave concern at the alleged persecution and prosecution of Mr. Noor, for the exercise of his human rights to freedom of thought, conscience, religion or belief, opinion and expression."

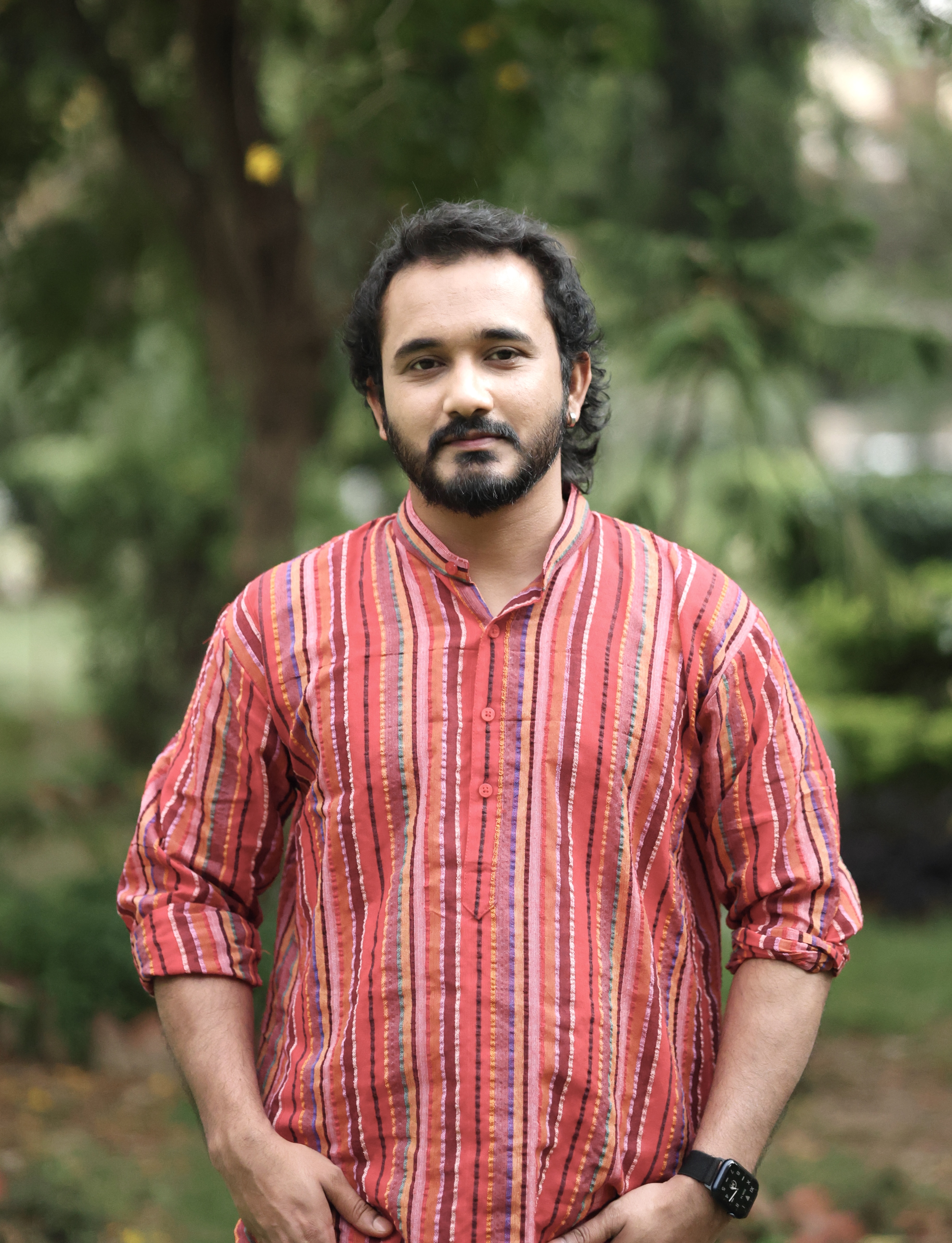
Asad Noor in 2024.

In 2021, during a General Debate at the 46th Session of the UN Human Rights Council, Humanists International's Advocacy Officer Lillie Ashworth raised the issue of Asad Noor's persecution and demanded justice for him. She also expressed her concerns about the harassment of Noor's family members by Bangladeshi law enforcement agencies and reminded Bangladesh of its "moral and legal obligation" to protect the rights of human rights activists.

== See also ==
- Asif Mohiuddin
- 2013 Shahbag protests
