= Willes Little Flower School =

Private school in Kakrail, Dhaka, Bangladesh

Willes Little Flower School and College
- উইল্‌স লিট্‌ল ফ্লাওয়ার স্কুল এন্ড কলেজ

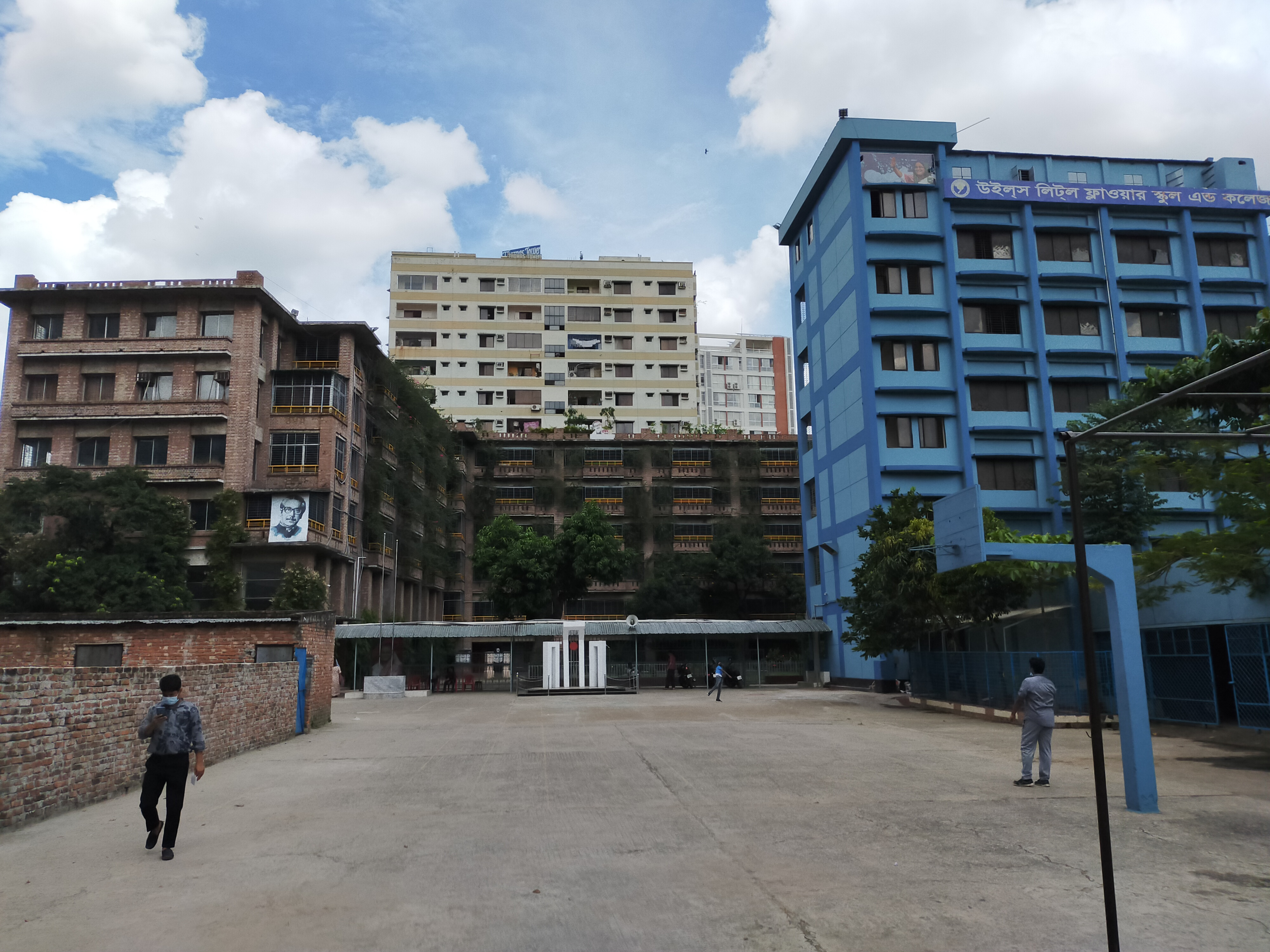

Location
- 85, Bir Uttam Samsul Alam Sarak, Kakrail, Ramna, Dhaka 1000, Bangladesh; Dhaka, 1000; Bangladesh; 23°44′18″N 90°24′27″E

Information
- Former name: Willes Little Flower Higher Secondary School
- Type: English medium school / Bangla medium school / English version school
- Motto: Light, More Light
- Established: 1956
- Founder: Josephine Willes
- Chairman: A. B. M. Abdus Sattar
- Principal: Shamsul Alam Khan (Acting)
- Headmaster: Md. Nasiruddin, Md Rafiqul Islam, Uttam Kumar Hazra, Ms Nasima Chadni
- Staff: 50 (Estimated)
- Faculty: 4
- Teaching staff: 350 (Estimated)
- Grades: Nursery to 12 / A Level
- Enrollment: 25,000 ( 2019 - 2024 )
- Language: Bangla, English
- Schedule: Summer Time 7:15-11:50 (Morning Shift) 12:25-5:00 (Day Shift) Winter Time 7:45-11:40 (Morning Shift) 12:20-4:20 (Day Shift)
- Hours in school day: Summer Time 4 Hours 35 Minutes - Morning Shift 4 Hours 35 Minutes - Day Shift Total - 9 hours 45 Minutes Winter Time 3 Hours 55 Minutes - Morning Shift 4 Hours - Day Shift Total - 7 hours 55 Minutes
- Classrooms: 119
- Campus type: Urban
- Colors: Willes blue and white
- Sports Teams: Handball Team, Football Team, Cricket Team
- Tuition: 1330 - EV/BM - Class 1-5 1130 - EV/BM - Class 6-10
- Website: wlfsc.edu.bd

Willes Little Flower School and College is one of the three first English medium schools in Dhaka, Bangladesh and was established in 1956 by philanthropist Josephine Willes. The school follows the English version under Directorate of Secondary and Higher Education.The school also provides classes under Pearson Edexcel for students who will sit for A-levels. The school also has a Bangla medium sections.

== History ==
Willes Little Flower School and College was founded in 1956 by Josephine Willes, an American missionary who had relocated to the region in 1948. Initially establishing the institution in a rented house in Kakrail with only 12 students, she named the school after her late husband, William Willes.

The institution originally operated under the Cambridge University curriculum. Over time, it expanded to incorporate a Bangla medium section, an English version under the National Curriculum and Textbook Board (NCTB), and English medium classes under Pearson Edexcel. In 1996, the institution was upgraded to college status and began offering GCE A-Level courses.

== Facilities ==
There are 119 rooms in the school building and 32 in the college building. There are two teacher's rooms, one for BM and EV teachers and the other for EM teachers. There is a library alongside a giant auditorium. There is also a two storied office fuilding. There is a guardian shade. The school used to have four gates but one of them was closed to build the guardian shade and the gate was replaced by a door which leads to the guardian shade. There is an ICT Lab, a physics lab and a chemistry lab. There are also many clubs, Willes Literature Club, Willes Cultural Club, Willes Photography Club, Willes Science Club, Willes Debate Club, and Willes English Club. There are also four volunteer organizations, Scout, Red-Crescent, BNCC and Girls Guide.

== Location ==
The school is located in the Kakrail area of Dhaka city. Address is 85, Kakrail, Dhaka, 1000.

== Campus and curriculum ==
The institution operates an urban campus in Kakrail, Dhaka, transitioning its original two-story British-style architecture into modern six-story academic buildings. The school hosts a faculty of approximately 400 educators serving students from nursery through grade 12.

Academic streams are split across three primary tracks:

- Bangla Medium: Following the national curriculum.
- English Version: Following the national curriculum translated into English.
- English Medium: Administered under the Pearson Edexcel international curriculum for O-Level and A-Level qualifications.

== Co-curricular activities ==
The school supports several student-led and structured co-curricular organizations. Notable groups operating within the campus include:

- Willes Debate Club (WDC)
- Bangladesh Scouts and Girl Guides unit
- Willes Sports Club
- Science and Publication clubs

== Notable alumni ==
- Shayan Chowdhury Arnob – Singer-songwriter, musician, and fine artist
- Nizam Uddin Chowdhury – Sports administrator and Chief Executive Officer of the Bangladesh Cricket Board (BCB)
- Jon Kabir – Musician and actor, former lead vocalist of the rock band Black
- Zara Jabeen Mahbub – Corporate executive, banker, and politician
- Shakila Zafar – Mainstream classical and playback singer
