= Protimuhurtey =

Studio album by Stentorian
- Released: 2005
- Genre: Heavy metal
- Length: 70:01
- Label: G Series
- Producer: Stentorian, Bassbaba

Stentorian chronology
| Protimuhurtey (2005) | Untitled 2nd album (2010) |

Protimuhurtey (Bengali: প্রতিমুহূর্তে) is the debut album by Bangladeshi heavy metal band Stentorian released in October 2005. This album is most notable for exceptionally strong lyric and melodic composition, compiling of a full-length studio album. The most notable songs from this album include Adrissho Juddho 2, Bidrohi, Jolosrot, Anubhuti and Mone pore na.

== Track listing ==
| No. | Title | Length |
|---|---|---|
| 1. | "Bidrohi" | 4:40 |
| 2. | "Jolosrot" | 5:01 |
| 3. | "Adrissho Juddho – 2" | 4:10 |
| 4. | "Bhoy (Bonus Track)" | 4:12 |
| 5. | "Mone Pore Na?" | 4:47 |
| 6. | "Protimuhurtey" | 5:34 |
| 7. | "Jonmantor" | 4:04 |
| 8. | "Akrosh" | 4:11 |
| 9. | "Anubhuti" | 4:04 |
| 10. | "Misrobodh" | 5:14 |
| 11. | "Oshomapto" | 4:30 |
| 12. | "Adrissho Juddho (Bonus Track)" | 4:37 |

== Personnel ==
Stentorian

- Torsha Khan – Vocals (2001–2008)
- James Kabir – Guitars, Backup Vocals
- Tutul Rashid – Guitars
- Rafiul Habib – Drums, Percussion
- Shams Alim Biswas – Bass, Backup vocals, vocals on track "Mone pore na" and "Anubhuti“
- Tanim Sufyani— Vocals

Guest musicians

- Iqbal Asif Jewel (Miles) — Guitar solo on "Mone pore na?"

Album art and design

- Zahidul Haque Apu
