= Shihab Shaheen =

Bangladeshi film director

- শিহাব শাহীন
- Education: Islamic University, Bangladesh
- Occupations: Film director, scriptwriter and producer
- Spouse: Zakia Bari Mamo (m. 2015; div. 2020)
- Children: 1
- Awards: Meril Prothom Alo Awards

Shihab Shaheen (Bengali: শিহাব শাহীন) is a Bangladeshi film director, producer and screenwriter. He made his directorial debut in 2001 with a television drama "Ghurni". He made his breakthrough with the television serial, Romijer Ayna in 2005. His notable telefilm works include X-Factor, X-Factor 2, Bhalobashi Tai, Bhalobashi Tai Bhalobeshe Jai, Monforing er Golpo, Monsuba Junction, Nilpori Nilanjona, Nil Projapoti and Bini Shutor Taan.ers

In 2015, Shaheen directed his first feature film, Chuye Dile Mon starring Arifin Shuvoo and Zakia Bari Mamo, which was super hit and received mostly positive reviews from the critics and audiences.

He made the superhit web series "Myself Allen Swapan" in 2023, "Syndicate" in 2022. In 2019, Shaheen directed August 14, a crime thriller web series based on a true incident where a police officer & his wife were murdered by their own drug addict daughter at home in Dhaka.

== Career ==
=== Early works ===
Shaheen was associated with a theater group while attending college in Feni, Bangladesh, where he had written and directed his first play titled Tit Potla in 1993. He joined another theater group, "Desh Natok" after moving to Dhaka, acted in a number of plays and took a six-month course on film direction from a private company. He went to make his first television drama, "Ghurni" starring Litu Anam and Bonna Mirza in 2001 which aired on NTV. After that, he made a number of telefilms including Ingit, Rupkoth, Dadir Lal Baksho and Gora Jamai, however, the turning point of his career was the 2005 drama serial, Romijer Ayna, which became very popular among audiences in the 2000s.

=== Drama and Telefilms ===
Since 2001, Shaheen has made more than 75 television dramas and telefilms. After Romijer Ayna, he made his first telefilm titled X Factor in 2008 for NTV starring Ziaul Faruq Apurba, Iresh Zaker, Rafiath Rashid Mithila, Mozeza Ashraf Monalisa and Jenny. Followed by its immense popularity, he went to make a sequel of the telefilm titled X Factor 2. Seven years later, he decided to direct the third and final installment of the telefilm, titled X Factor: Gameover after receiving a vast number of requests and demands from the viewers. It retained some of the original cast from X Factor 2, including Apurba, Iresh Zaker, Mithila and Farhana Mili and added Zakia Bari Mamo as a new character. It was written by Shihab Shaheen and Mesbah Uddin Sumon and produced jointly by Alpha I Media Production and Grameenphone. In 2017, he made another telefilm, titled X-Factor Reloaded, a reboot of the previous series which starred Siam Ahmed, Tawsif Mahbub, Sabnam Faria and Nadia Afrin Mim replacing the original cast.

In 2010, Shaheen directed a romantic telefilm Bhalobashi Tai, which aired on NTV on the occasion of Pahela Baishakh. It became very popular among the audiences and its title track "Jol Shopno" sung by Palbasha Siddique was a big hit. In 2011, he made another telefim titled, Bhalobashi Tai Bhalobeshe Jai on the occasion of Eid-ul-Adha starring Arifin Shuvoo, Sanjida Pritee, Joya Ahsan, Iresh Zaker, Nusrat Imroz Tisha and Omar Ayaz. Ihe telefilm broke the record of previous years and secured the highest TRP of the year (most watched drama program in a year).

Shaheen other notable television works include, Monforing er Golpo, Monsuba Junction, Nilpori Nilanjona, Rupkotha Ar Hoyna, Prem Ki Keboli Ekti Rashayonik Bikria?, Anamika, Bhalobashar Pongtimala, Jackson Billal, Shesh Porjonto, Bini Shutor Taan, Adittya Er Mounota and Obujh Diner Golpo.

Since 2019, Shaheen has made a number of web television series including Ditiyo Koishor, Chena Pother Oporichita, Kuhok and August 14.

=== Directorial debut and success ===
In 2015, Shaheen made his directorial debut with the romantic drama film Chuye Dile Mon starring Arifin Shuvoo and Zakia Bari Mamo, Iresh Zaker, Anondo Khaled, Quazi Nawshaba Ahmed and Misha Sawdagor. The story revolves around Abir and Nila portrayed by Shuvo and Mam, who fell in love from their very childhood, but grows apart as they mature. Later on in life, they happened to meet again accidentally, came close and revived their love, later on, the story takes another turn. The artists involved with the soundtrack for the film include Habib, Tahsan, Kona and others. It received mostly positive reviews from the critics and audience. Shaheen's direction was praised, and the film emerged as a major commercial success. It won maximum number of awards at 18th Meril Prothom Alo Awards and earned Shaheen his first Critic Choice Awards for Best Feature Film and a nomination for the Best Director (Film).

Shaheen's next directorial venture was Anarkali, which he announced to make with Tahsan Khan and Zakia Bari Mamo as stars which had been postponed later for further planning.

== Personal life ==
Shihab Shaheen Married twice. Shaheen was married to actress Zakia Bari Mamo in 2015. They were divorced in 2020. Mamo was his second wife. He has a daughter from his first marriage.

== Accolades ==
Award	Year	Category	Work	Result	Ref.
18th Meril Prothom Alo Awards	2016	Best Film Director (critic choice)	Chuye Dile Mon	Nominated	
BDFA Awards	2024	Best Director in OTT	Baba Someone's Following Me	Won	
BIFA Awards	2025	Best Film Director	Daagi	Won	

== Works ==
=== Film ===
Denotes films that have not yet been released

Year	Films	Credit	Notes	Ref
2015	Chuye Dile Mon	Story, screenplay and direction		
2025	Daagi	Story, screenplay and direction		
TBA	Anarkali	Postponed		
TBA	Mon Phoring†	Postponed		

=== Television ===
Year	Title	Notes	Ref
2001	Ghurni	Drama	
2003	Ingit	Telefilm	
2004	Rupkotha	Telefilm	
2005	Dadir Lal Baksho	Telefilm	
2005	Gora Jamai	Telefilm	
2005	Romijer Ayna	Drama Serial (122 episodes)	
2006	Somprodan	Shortfilm	
2006	X-Factor	Telefilm	
2007	It Kather Khacha	Drama Serial	
2008	Oporinamdorshi	Shortfilm	
2008	X-Factor 2	Telefilm	
2009	Anchor Mofiz	Drama	
2010	Mamuli Ekta Manush	Drama Serial	
2010	Bhalobashi Tai	Telefilm	
2011	Bhalobashi Tai Bhalobeshe Jai	Telefilm	
2011	Ononto Odhora	Telefilm	
2011	Arranged Marriage	Telefilm	
2012	Mumbasha	Drama Serial	
2012	Monforing er Golpo	Telefilm	
2012	Monsuba Junction	Telefilm	
2012	Ami Tumi O Rashichokro	Telefilm	
2012	Obarchin	Telefilm	
2013	Nilpori Nilanjona	Telefilm	
2013	Nil Projapoti	Telefilm	
2014	Bhalobashar Chotushkon	Mega Drama serial (130 episodes)	
2015	Nischito Premer Saat ti Upay	Limited series	
2015	Tomar Amar Biye	Drama	
2015	Nilanjona	Drama	
2016	Shey Raate Bristy Chilo	Eid Drama	
2016	Rupkotha Ar Hoyna	Eid Drama	
2016	Ekti Puraton Premer Golpo	Eid Drama	
2016	X-Factor: Gameover	Eid Telefilm	
2016	Prem Ki Keboli Ekti Rashayonik Bikria?	Eid Drama	
2016	Titir	Eid Drama	
2016	Projapotir Kosto	Eid Drama	
2016	Anamika	Eid Drama	
2016	Mon Shudhu Mon Chuyeche	Drama	
2016	Faand	Shortfilm	
2016	Bhalobashar Pongtimala	Eid Telefilm	
2016	Mehman	Eid Drama	
2016	Prem Bhalobasha Ittadi	Eid Drama	
2017	Mannequin Mumu	Telefilm	
2017	Jackson Billal	Drama	
2017	Dhushor Rekhar Opare	Drama	
2017	Soulmate	Telefilm	
2017	Postmortem	Eid Telefilm	
2017	Alor Pakhi	Eid Telefilm	
2017	Divorce	Eid Drama	
2017	Kalo Cheler Prem	Drama	
2017	X-Factor Reloaded	Telefilm	
2018	Lipstick	Drama serial	
2018	Bus Stop	Drama	
2018	Tumi Jodi Bolo	Drama	
2018	Upohar	Valentine's Day Special; Love Express 3.0 Shortfilms	
2018	Bondhu Hobe	Valentine's Day Special; Love Express 3.0 Shortfilms	
2018	Maa Er Diary	Valentine's Day Special; Love Express 3.0 Shortfilms	
2018	Bujhini Tokhon	Valentine's Day Special; Love Express 3.0 Shortfilms	
2018	Proposal	Valentine's Day Special; Love Express 3.0 Shortfilms	
2018	Shesh Porjonto	Eid Telefilm	
2018	Ei Shohore Keu Nei	Eid Telefilm	
2018	Kichu Dukkho Sobari Thake	Drama	
2018	Bondhon	Drama	
2018	Ekdin Sofia	Drama	
2018	Bini Shutor Taan	Telefilm	
2018	Adittya Er Mounota	Telefilm	
2019	Partner	Drama	
2019	Obujh Diner Golpo	Drama	
2019	Ek Hridoyhina	Telefilm	
2019	Baundule	Eid Drama	
2019	Bemanan	Drama serial	
2020	Obujh Diner Golpo 2	Drama	
2020	Lockdown	Shortfilm	
2020	Corona Bole Kichu Nei	Shortfilm	
2021	Plus Four Point Five	NTV Eid Drama	

=== Web works ===
Year	Title	Notes	Ref
2019	Ditiyo Koishor	Bioscope Original (Web film); Cameo appearance	
2019	Chena Pother Oporichita	Web Series	
2019	Kuhok	Web Series	
2020	August 14	Binge (Web Series)	
2020	Jodi..Kintu..Tobou	ZEE5 (Web film)	
2021	Morichika	Chorki (Web Series)	
2022	Syndicate	Chorki (Web Series), Pre-production	
2022	Mayashalik	Binge (Web film)	
2023	Myself Allen Swapan	Chorki	
2024	Kacher Manush Dure Thuiya	Chorki	
