= Amar Prithibi =

আমার পৃথিবী (My Earth)

Studio album by Black
- Released: 2002
- Recorded: 1999–02
- Studio: Sound Garden, Dhaka, Bangladesh
- Genre: Alternative rock
- Length: 41:09
- Label: G-Series

Black chronology
আমার পৃথিবী (My Earth) (2002)	উৎসবের পর (After the Festival) (2003)

Amar Prithibi (Bengali: আমার পৃথিবী) is the debut studio album by Bangladeshi alternative rock band Black, released in 2002 by G-Series. According to the record label, the album has sold over 300,000 copies. Years later and following the release of further albums, its songs "Amar Prithibi", "Amra", "Obhiman", "Prarthonad", and "Miththa" remained some of Black's most popular compositions with fans, according to journalists at The Daily Star and The Business Standard.

== Background and recording ==
Black's first released song, "Chena Dukkho", appeared on the mixed album Chharpotro in 2000. Its success led to a record contract.

In 2001, the band began working on a full-scale album at Isha Khan Duray and Imran Ahmed Chowdhury Mobin's studio Sound Garden. The album contains mostly songs written by the band during the earliest stages of their formation. The album was recorded across three different studios in Dhaka.

The sitar in the title track was played by the band's guitarist Jahan. The intro of the opening track "Amra" a music box was recorded which played the intro of "Für Elise".

The cover photo was taken by Khademul Mushfeque Jahan's elder brother, Khademul Insan.

== Track listing ==
No.	Title	Length
1.	"Amra"	4:04
2.	"Obhiman"	4:37
3.	"Amar Prithibi"	4:11
4.	"Kobor"	3:43
5.	"Bikkhoto"	3:11
6.	"Prarthonad"	4:09
7.	"Ekhono"	4:00
8.	"Kothay"	3:03
9.	"Manush"	5:03
10.	"Ondhokarer Pashe"	3:21
11.	"Mittha"	3:56
12.	"Dukkher Rong [Crap]"	3:49
Total length:		41:09

== Personnel ==
- Zobayer Hossain Emon - writer
- Jon Kabir - vocals, guitar
- Khademul Mushfeque Jahan - lead guitar, sitar, tabla
- Mahmudul Karim Miraz - bass
- Mehmood Tony - drum kit
- Tahsan Rahman Khan - vocals, keyboard

=== Guest musicians ===
- Elita Karim - vocals on track 11
