= Stentorian =

Heavy metal band from Bangladesh

- Origin: Dhaka, Bangladesh
- Genres: Heavy metal; hard rock; thrash metal
- Years active: 2001–present
- Label: G-Series
- Members: James Kabir; Anabeel Sen; Rabiul Awal Real; Sumit Gaurab; Ahmad Abdullah Saquib
- Past members: Torsha Khan; Tanim Sufyani; Golam Waise; Shams Alim Biswas; Bobby Khan; Tutul Rashid; Rafiul Habib

Stentorian (Bengali: স্টেনটোরিয়ান) is a heavy metal band from Bangladesh formed in early 2001. Stentorian released the commercial album, Protimuhurtey, in 2005 along with several singles. Stentorian is led by Bangladeshi rock vocalists Torsha Khan and Tanim Sufyani. Stentorian is classified as heavy metal, and fits into various other genres such as soft rock, power ballad, thrash metal, and progressive metal.

== History ==
=== 2001–2004: Early years ===
Stentorian's original line-up consisted of Torsha Khan (vocals), James Kabir (guitar), Shams Alim Biswas (bass), Golam (guitar), and Bobby Khan (drums). The band performed at a concert at the Indian High Commission Auditorium in Dhaka on October 27, 2001. In 2003, Golam left the band, but they continued performing and composing new songs.

Later, Stentorian participated in Agontuk-2, a band-mix album coordinated by Bassbaba Sumon. Before leaving the band to pursue studies abroad, Torsha recorded the vocal tracks for "Adrissho Juddho" and "Bhoy." These songs were later released in the mixed albums Agontuk-2 and Dinbodol, respectively.

=== 2004–2006: Bishonno Adhaar and Protimuhurtey ===
In 2004, Torsha suggested that his childhood friend, Tanim Sufyani, join the band. Tanim Sufyani joined Stentorian in September 2004. Tutul Rashid and Rafiul Habib also joined.

The band performed in multiple concerts in 2005. After the release of Bishonno Adhaar, Stentorian had their first national tour. After the tour, they signed up with G-Series, a musical label in Bangladesh. Stentorian concentrated on recording their debut album. After Torsha's departure, Stentorian released its debut album, Protimuhurtey, in October 2005.

=== 2007–present ===
Stentorian released a track on the mixed album Rock 101, "Choritrohin." Anabeel Sen replaced Shams on bass. On 7 March 2010, a song was released from the second album as an album preview, "Chhobi." Stentorian later participated in the 4 June 2010 live show on ABC Radio. In December 2011, Tanim Sufyani left Stentorian again due to personal problems, forming the short-lived band Pledge Karma. In January 2012, "Rabiul Awal Real" joined as Tanim's replacement, and in March 2013, Sumit Gaurab joined in, replacing Tutul Rashid. Ahmad Abdullah Saquib joined the band in 2015, replacing Rafiul Habib on drums.

== Discography ==
=== Studio albums ===
- 2005: Protimuhurtey
- 2011: Untitled second album (Announced)

=== Compilation tracks ===
- 2004: Adrissho Juddho (Agontuk-2)
- 2004: Bhoy (Dinbodol)
- 2005: Nilkal (Lokayot)
- 2005: Bishonno Adhaar (feat. Bassbaba) (Agontuk-3)
- 2007: Opomrittu (UnderGround-2)
- 2008: Choritrohin (Rock 101)

== Members ==
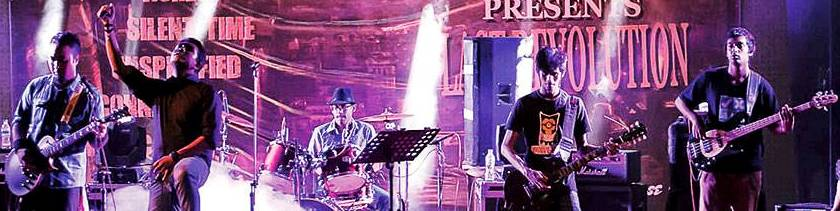
Stentorian's band members

=== Current members ===
- James Kabir – Guitars and backup vocals (2001–present)
- Anabeel Sen – Bass and backup vocals (2008–present)
- Rabiul Awal Real – Vocals (2012–present)
- Sumit Gaurab – Guitars (2013–present)
- Ahmad Abdullah Saquib – Drums and percussion (2015–present)

=== Former members ===
- Golam Waise – Guitars (2001–2003)
- Bobby Khan – Drums (2001–2012)
- Torsha Khan – Vocals (2001–2008)
- Shams Alim Biswas – Bass and backup vocals (2001–2007)
- Tanim Sufyani – Vocals (2004–2011)
- Tutul Rashid – Guitars (2003–2012)
- Rafiul Habib – Drums and percussion (2005–2015)
