= Utshober Por =

উৎসবের পর (After the Festival)

Studio album by Black
- Released: 2003
- Recorded: 2002–03
- Studio: Sound Garden, Dhaka, Bangladesh
- Genre: Alternative rock
- Label: G-Series
- Producer: Black

Black chronology
| আমার পৃথিবী (My Earth) (2002) | উৎসবের পর (After the Festival) (2003) | আবার (Again) (2008) |

Utshober Por (Bengali: উৎসবের পর) is the second studio album by Bangladeshi rock band Black, released in 2003. Musically it was a change in direction for Black, the album started off to selling a significant number of copies yet to little fanfare but generally favorable critical reception and is now considered to be one of the most significant alternative rock records in Bangladesh. The album features guest vocal performances by singer and The Daily Star journalist Elita Karim in three tracks and a much-maligned rap performance by rapper Mark.

== Track listing ==
| No. | Title | Length |
|---|---|---|
| 1. | "?" | 3:12 |
| 2. | "O" | 3:16 |
| 3. | "Porahoto" | 4:48 |
| 4. | "Ichcha" | 3:32 |
| 5. | "Onukkhon" | 2:27 |
| 6. | "Utshober Por" | 2:52 |
| 7. | "Apomit" | 3:58 |
| 8. | "Aki Rokom" | 2:53 |
| 9. | "Ei Chayapatha" | 3:17 |
| 10. | "Ruddhobodh" | 4:16 |
| 11. | "Shloak" | 4:35 |
| 12. | "6 September" | 2:50 |
| 13. | "Michi Michi" | 2:31 |
| 14. | "Prakitik" | 4:33 |
| 15. | "Aka" | 4:35 |
| 16. | "Bimurto" | 3:40 |

== Production ==
- Recorded by Imran Ahmed Choudhury Mobin & Isha Khan Duray
- Recorded at Sound Garden
- Mixed and mastered by Isha Khan Duray
- Mastering Co-ordinator: G.m Zooel
- Studio crews: Porimal, Achinto, Sukanto
- Photography: Khademul Insan
- Graphics: Rubait Islam

== Line up ==
- Jon – vocals, guitar
- Jahan – lead guitar
- Miraz – bass
- Tony – drums
- Tahsan – vocals, keyboard

== Guest musicians ==
- Chowdhury Shakib (Cryptic Fate): Vocals (Track 4)
- Elita: Vocals (Track 3, 11, 15)
- Mark (Sellout): Rap Vocals (Track 14)
- Zubair Malik: Flute (Track 11)
