= Tahsan Rahman Khan =

Bangladeshi musician and actor (born 1979)

- তাহসান রহমান খান
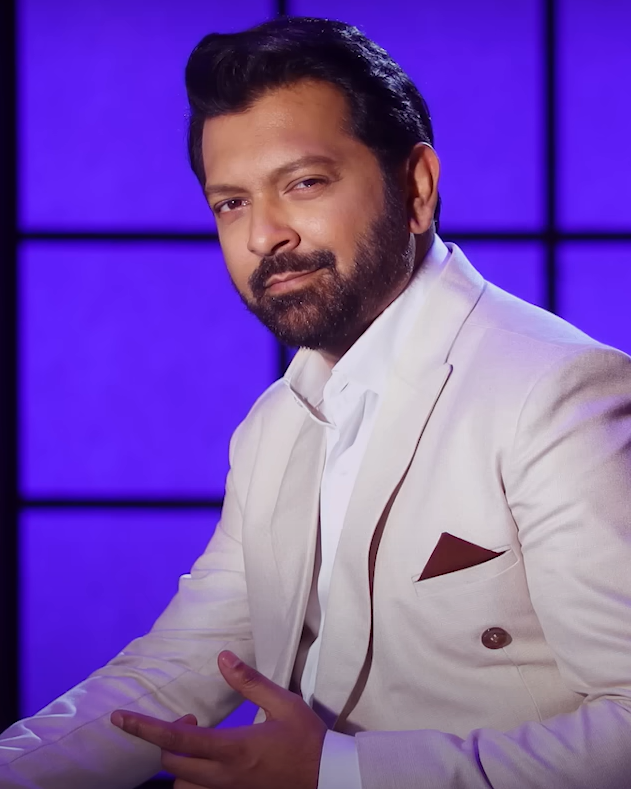
- Tahsan in 2024
- Born: 18 October 1979 (age 47); Dhaka, Bangladesh
- Education: IBA, University of Dhaka (BBA, MBA); University of Minnesota (MBA)
- Occupations: Singer; musician; actor; television presenter
- Years active: 2000 - 2025
- Spouse: Rafiath Rashid Mithila (m. 2006; div. 2017) Roza Ahmed (m. 2025; div. 2026)
- Children: 1
- Mother: Z. N. Tahmida Begum
- Musical career
- Genres: Pop music; Bangali film pop; rock
- Instruments: Guitar; piano; vocals
- Labels: G-Series; CD Choice

Tahsan Rahman Khan (born 18 October 1979) is a Bangladeshi musician, actor and the current host of the game show Family Feud Bangladesh. He began acting on television in 2004 with the drama Offbeat and has appeared in more than 100 telefilms and films. He was the keyboardist and second vocalist of the grunge and alternative rock band Black, and later left to pursue a solo career; his first solo album, Kothopokothon, was released in 2004. He also formed his own band, Tahsan and the Band.

In January 2021, he was appointed a Goodwill Ambassador of UNHCR.

== Early life and education ==
Tahsan was born and raised in Dhaka. His ancestral home is in Srinagar of Munshiganj Bikrampur. He learned singing at Shishu Academy and Chhayanaut. He completed SSC from St. Joseph Higher Secondary School and HSC from Notre Dame College, Dhaka. He obtained a BBA in marketing and an MBA in finance from the Institute of Business Administration, University of Dhaka. He completed a second MBA at the University of Minnesota on a Fulbright scholarship.

In addition to music and acting career, Tahsan worked as a university teacher. He was a senior lecturer at BRAC University and he was a lecturer at ULAB. He was also a lecturer at Eastern University.

== Personal life ==
Khan’s mother Z. N. Tahmida Begum is a botanist and first woman chairperson of Bangladesh Public Service Commission.

Khan met Rafiath Rashid Mithila in 2004 when they were students at the University of Dhaka. They married in 2006. The couple announced their divorce in 2017. Their daughter, Ayra Tehrim Khan, was four years old at the time. His father died on 12 April 2023. Tahsan married Roza Ahmed on 4 January 2025. But the marriage fell apart within a year. He announced his divorce with Roza on 10 January 2026.

== Discography ==
Black

- Amar Prithibi (2002)
- Utshober Por (2003)

Tahsan and the Band

- Shobar Jonne Na (2020)

Studio albums

- Kothopokothon (2004)
- Kritodasher Nirban (25 December 2005)
- Ichche (25 December 2006)
- Nei (2008)
- Prottaborton (February 2011)
- Uddessho Nei (22 July 2014)
- Oviman Amar (October 2017)

Movie songs

- Chuye Dile Mon (Title Track) - Movie : Chuye Dile Mon (2015) ft. Tahsan & Kona
- Ami Parbona Tomar Hote - Movie : Jodi Ekdin (2019) ft. Tahsan & Konal
- Jonom Jonom - Jongli (2025) ft. Tahsan & Atiya Anisha
- Ektukhani Mon - Daagi (2025)

Featured albums

- Tahsan ft. Minar (Danpite) (2008)
- Tahsan ft. Sakib Jakir (Self titled) (2009)
- Tahsan ft. Minar (Aari) (2011)

Singles

- Lighthouse
- Kothay Acho – Telefilm: Amader Golpo (2012)
- Megher Pore – Telefilm: Monforinger Golpo (2012)
- Prothom Prem – Telefilm: Monsuba Junction (2012)
- Keno Hathat Tumi Ele – Telefilm: Nilpari Neelanjana (2013)
- Asmani – Telefilm: Nilpori Neelanjana (2013)
- Acho Hridoye – Online release (2014)
- Kono Ek Katha Bondhu – Drama: Katha Bondhu Mithila (2014)
- Tabu Keno – Drama: Addiction (2014)
- Prem Tumi – Telefilm: Angry Bird (2015)
- Ato Maya – Telefilm: Couple (2015)
- Tumimoy- Drama: To Airport (2015)
- Bhalobashar Mane- Drama: Tai Tomake (2016)
- Jaccho Hariye- Drama: Prem Tumi (2016)
- Ki Hoto Bole Gele - Drama : Memories - Kolpo Torur Golpo (2019)
- Smritir Fanush - Tahsan & Sushmita Anis (2020)
- Odrissho Porojibi - Tahsan (2020)
- Protibadi Gaan - Tahsan & The Band (2020)
- Ekdin - Tahsan (2021)
- Hariye Feli Jodi - Short Film : Shunno Theke Shuru, Closeup Kache Ashar Golpo (2021)
- Dokhino Hawa (2022) - Coke Studio Bangla

== Works ==
=== Films ===
Year	Title	Role	Director	Notes	Ref.
2019	Jodi Ekdin: The Sacrifice	Faisal	Mohammad Mostafa Kamal Raz	Debut film	
2021	No Land's Man		Mostofa Sarwar Farooki		

=== Television ===
Year	Title	Co-Artist	Director	Notes	Ref(s)
2004	Off Beat	Jaya Ahsan	Afsana Mimi	Drama	
2008	Modhuren Somapoyet	Mithila	Ashfaque Nipun	Drama	
2011	Ontorgota	Tisha	Shamim Shahed	Drama	
2012	Hit wicket	Mithila	Syed Mohammad Ishrafil	Drama	
2012	Amader Golpo	Joya Ahsan	Iftekhar Ahmed Fahmi	Telefilm	
2012	Shomoy Churi	Mithila	Amitabh Reza Chowdhury	Drama	
2012	Revision	Monalisa, Ohona, Faria	Shafayet Mansoor Rana	Drama	
2012	Monforing er Golpo	Tisha	Shihab Shaheen	Telefilm	
2012	Monshuba Junction	Tisha	Shihab Shaheen	Telefilm	
2012	Ditiyo Matra	Asif, Asha	Masudul Hasan, Rasel Sikdar	Drama	
2013	Firefly	Tisha	Mabrur Rashid Bannah	Drama	
2013	Eclipse	Momo, Aparna Ghosh	Mabrur Rashid Bannah	Drama	
2013	Sporsher Baire Tumi	Aparna Ghosh	Imraul Rafat	Drama	
2013	Moner Moto Mon	Tisha, Mehazabien Chowdhury	Imraul Rafat	Drama	
2013	Nilpori Nilanjona	Momo	Shihab Shaheen	Telefilm	
2013	Alien o Rumpar Golpo	Tisha	Mabrur Rashid Bannah	Telefilm	
2013	Alien O Rumpar Golpo : Rise Of Evil	Tisha, Iresh Zaker	Mabrur Rashid Bannah	Telefilm	
2013	Onno Rokom Porir Golpo	Tisha	R B Pritom	Drama	
2013	Landphone Er Dingulote Prem	Mithila, Orchita Sporshia	Ashfaque Nipun	Drama	
2013	Love Lane	Tisha	Imraul Rafat	Drama	
2014	All About Us	Tisha	Mabrur Rashid Bannah	Telefilm	
2014	Kotha Bondhu Mithila	Ognila Iqbal	Masud Hasan Uzzal	Valentine's Special Drama	
2014	Opekkha	Tisha, Ognila Iqbal	Imraul Rafat	Drama	
2014	Old is Gold	Bidya Sinha Mim	Imraul Rafat	Drama	
2014	Hothat Tomar Jonno	Sharlin Farzana	Taneem Rahman Angshu	Drama	
2014	Somporker Golpo	Urmila Srabonti Kar	Mabrur Rashid Bannah	Drama	
2014	Uddessho Nei	Bidya Sinha Mim	Mabrur Rashid Bannah	Drama	
2014	Return	Mehazabien	Mohammad Mostafa Kamal Raz	Drama	
2014	He & She	Mithila	Ashfaque Nipun	Drama	
2014	Love & War	Tisha	Imraul Rafat	Drama	
2014	Addiction	Tisha, Jon Kabir	Shafayet Mansoor Rana	Drama	
2015	Chinigura Prem – Kache Ashar Golpo	Nowrin Hasan Khan Jenny, Shahtaj Monira Hashem	Golam Kibria Farooki	Valentine's Special Drama	
2015	Story of Thousand Days	Nusrat Imroz Tisha, Sayed Zaman Shawon	Mabrur Rashid Bannah	Eid Drama	
2015	Angry Bird	Nusrat Imroz Tisha	Mizanur Rahman Aryan	Eid Drama	
2015	Shukher Chharpotro	Mithila, Irin Afrose, Muhammad Anik	Ashfaque Nipun	Eid Drama	
2015	Oviman Porbo	Aparna Ghosh	Ashfaque Nipun	Eid Drama	
2015	To Airport	Nusrat Imroz Tisha	Mizanur Rahman Aryan	Telefilm	
2015	Hath Ta Dao Na Bariye	Mehazabien	Shafayet Monsur Rana	Valentine's Special Drama	
2015	Tomaye Bhebe Lekha	Nusrat Imroz Tisha, Safa Kabir	Imraul Rafat	Drama	
2015	Tai Tomake	Sumaiya Zafar Suzana, Rukhsana Ali Hera	Mizanur Rahman Aryan	Drama	
2015	Kichu Bhul Kichu Obhiman	Nusrat Imroz Tisha	Imraul Rafat	Drama	
2015	Kothpokothon	Mithila, Ziaul Faruq Apurba	Mizanur Rahman Aryan	Eid Drama	
2015	Prem ki Keboli Ekti Rashayonik Bikria?	Mithila	Shihab Shaheen	Eid Drama	
2015	Shei Meyeta	Bidya Sinha Saha Mim	Mizanur Rahman Aryan	Eid Telefilm	
2015	Mr & Mrs	Mithila	Mizanur Rahman Aryan	Eid Drama	
2015	Ei Poth Jodi Na Shes Hoi	Safa Kabir	Mahmudur Rahman Hime	Eid Drama	
2015	Mannequin Mumu	Zakia Bari Momo	Shihab Shaheen	Eid Drama	
2015	Tomar Pichu Pichu	Bidya Sinha Saha Mim	Mabrur Rashid Bannah	Valentin's Special Drama	
2015	Amar Golpe Tumi	Mithila	Mizanur Rahman Aryan	Valentin's Special Drama	
2016	Tomay Bhalobeshe	Anika Kabir Shokh	Morshed Rakin	Eid Special Drama	
2017	Porinoti	Imraul Rafat	Eid Telefilm		
2018	Sei Somoy Tumi Ami	Bidya Sinha Saha Mim	Mabrur Rashid Bannah		
2019	Maya Shobar Moto Na	Mehazabien Chowdhury	Sagar Jahan		
2019	Kono Ek Bikele Holud Saaree	Tisha	Sagar Jahan		
2019	Kotha Deya Ache	Tisha	Mizanur Rahman Aryan	Drama	
2019	Kotha Deya Chilo	Tisha	Mizanur Rahman Aryan		
2019	Angule Angul	Tisha (actress)	Mabrur Rashid Bannah	Eid Special Drama	
2019	Lady Killer	Tisha (actress)	Mabrur Rashid Bannah		
2019	Lady Killer 2	Tisha (actress)	Mabrur Rashid Bannah	Eid Special Drama	
2019	Amar Mr. Porishkar	Tisha (actress)	Mabrur Rashid Bannah		
2019	Asroy	Tisha (actress)	Mabrur Rashid Bannah		
2019	Phire Takao	Sabnam Faria, Tasnia Farin	Imraul Rafat	Eid Special Drama	
2019	Friday Love	Tisha	Topu Khan		
2019	Incomplete	Mehazabien Chowdhury	Kajal Arefin Ome		
2019	Date	Sarika Subrin	Mabrur Rashid Bannah		
2019	Shesh Bikel	Tanjin Tisha	Topu Khan		
2019	Kobul	Safa Kabir	Topu Khan		
2019	Paye Paye Hariye	Tisha (actress)	Imraul Rafat	Telefilm	
2019	Valobashte Baron	Shahtaj Monira Hashem	Ponir Khan	Eid-ul-Fitr Special	
2019	Ditiyo Koishor	Afran Nisho, Apurba, Sanjida Preeti, Nazia Haque Orsha, Affri Selina	Shihab Shaheen		
2019	Memories - Kolpo Torur Golpo	Saila Sabi	Mabrur Rashid Bannah		
2020	BhaloBasha Bashi	Purnima	Sagar Jahan	Valentine's Day Special	
2020	Valentine's Day 2020	Maria Nur	Mabrur Rashid Bannah	Valentine's Day Special	
2020	Kache Asha	Shaila Sabi	Mabrur Rashid Bannah	Valentine's Day Special	
2020	Beche Thak Bhalobasha	Tisha	Mahmudur Rahman Hime	Valentine's Day Special	
2020	Mukh O Mukhosher Golpo	Tisha	Ashfaque Nipun	Valentine's Day Special	
2020	Mim Fashion & Beauty	Zakia Bari Mamo	Sagar Jahan	Eid-Ul-Fitr Special	
2020	Angels	Tisha	Mabrur Rashid Bannah	Eid-Ul-Fitr Special	
2020	I Love You	Shaila Sabi	Mabrur Rashid Bannah	Eid-Ul-Fitr Special	
2020	Bhalobashar Golpo	Tasnuva Tisha	Mabrur Rashid Bannah	Eid-Ul-Fitr Special	
2020	Bibaho Korite Chai Na	Shaila Sabi	Rubel Hasan	Eid-Ul-Fitr Special	
2020	Hothat Biye	Bidya Sinha Saha Mim	Osman Miraz	Eid-Ul-Adzha Special	
2020	A Bitter Love Story	Safa Kabir	Mabrur Rashid Bannah	Eid-Ul-Adzha Special	
2020	Single	Shaila Sabi	Kajal Arefin Ome	Eid-Ul-Adzha Special	
2020	Dekha Hobe	Monalisa	Himel Ashraf	Eid-Ul-Adzha Special	
2020	Maa I Miss You	Monira Mithu	Mabrur Rashid Bannah	Eid-Ul-Adzha Special	
2020	Angel Girlfriend	Sabila Nur	Khairul Papon		
2021	Hello Baby	Bidya Sinha Saha Mim	Kajal Arefin Ome		
2021	Half Honeymoon	Nusrat Imrose Tisha	Mabrur Rashid Bannah	Valentine's Special Drama	
2021	Komola Ronger Rod	Tasnia Farin	Shihab Shaheen	Valentine's Special Drama	
2021	Light Camera Action	Tanjin Tisha	Rafat Mazumder Rinku	Valentine's Special Drama	
2021	90 Days	Tasnia Farin	Rubel Hasan	Valentine's Special Drama	
2021	Chok - The Maze	Orchita Sporshia	Golam Sohrab Dodul	Valentine's Special Drama	
2021	Shunno Theke Shuru	Sunehra Binte Kamal	Shankha Dasgupta	Valentine's Special Drama	
2021	Sherlock Holmes In Love	Sabila Nur	Mursalin Shuvo	Valentine's Special Drama	
2021	Paan Shupari	Mehazabien Chowdhury	Rubel Hasan		
2021	Tonatunir Bhalobasha	Tanjin Tisha	Sagar Jahan	Pohela Boishakh Special Drama	
2021	Ei Prithibi Amader	Purnima	Sagar Jahan	Eid-Ul-Fitr Special Drama	
2021	Credit Show	Mehazabien Chowdhury	Mohidul Mohim	Eid-Ul-Fitr Special Drama	
2021	Ondho	Tasnia Farin	Sanjoy Somadder	Eid-Ul-Fitr Special Drama	
2021	Kom Khoroche Bhalobasha	Sarika Subrin	Sagar Jahan	Eid-Ul-Fitr Special Drama	
2021	Shesher Khub Kache	Tanjin Tisha	Sagar Jahan	Eid-Ul-Fitr Special Drama	
2021	Anti Hero	Tanjin Tisha	Sanjoy Somadder	Eid-Ul-Fitr Special Drama	
2021	Made For Each Other	Tasnia Farin	Mabrur Rashid Bannah	Eid-Ul-Fitr Special Drama	
2021	Ektukhani	Tanjin Tisha	Ziaul Hauqe Polash	Eid-Ul-Fitr Special Drama	
2021	Maya	Maria Nur	Mabrur Rashid Bannah	Eid-Ul-Fitr Special Drama	
2021	Priyo Adnan	Sabila Nur	Vicky Zahed	Eid-Ul-Adha Special Drama	
2021	Mayer Daak	Momo, Dilara Zaman, Tawsif, Tasnia Farin, Jovan, Keya Payel	Mabrur Rashid Bannah	Eid-Ul-Adha Special Drama	
2021	Over Expectation	Tanjin Tisha	Mahmudur Rahman Hime	Eid-Ul-Adha Special Drama	
2021	Mokkho	Sabila Nur	Rubel Hasan	Eid-Ul-Adha Special Drama	
2021	Nikoshito	Rukaiya Jahan Chamak	Mabrur Rashid Bannah	Eid-Ul-Adha Special Drama	
2021	Home Politics	Tasnia Farin	Mabrur Rashid Bannah	Eid-Ul-Adha Special Drama	
2021	Parapaar	Sabila Nur, Manoj Kumar Pramanik	Rafat Mazumder Rinku	Eid-Ul-Adha Special Drama	
2021	Shob Choritro Bastob	Tanjin Tisha	Gautam Koiri	Eid-Ul-Adha Special Drama	
2021	Bela Boye Jay	Sabila Nur	Aga Nahiyan Ahmed		

=== Web series ===
Year	Title	OTT	Character	Co-Artist	Director	Notes
2019	Beauty and the Bullet	Bioscope	Kaiser Ahmed/Hasmat Ali/Netai/Akbar	Mim, Afran Nisho, Emon, Momo, Mim Mantasha, Badhan Lincoln, Suborna Mustafa, Tariq Anam Khan	Animesh Aich	

== Other works ==
As Host

- Lux Channel I Superstar 2006
- You Go, lLook
- Bhalobashar Golpo
- Eid Anonde Shurer Chhonde
- Honeymoon
- Drops and Beats
- Family Feud Bangladesh
- Voice for Bangladesh

As Judge

- Lux Channel I Superstar 2014
- Lux Channel I Superstar 2018
- Miss Universe Bangladesh 2019
- Miss Universe Bangladesh 2020

TV commercials

- Banglalink Amar Tune
- Close-Up Kache Ashar Golpo
- Ponds Facewash
- Jui Coconut Oil
- Aftab Spices
- Close-Up
- Meril Baby Products
- Marks Full Cream Milk Powder
- Chaka Super White
- Singer
- Grameenphone
- My GP App
- Fresh Premium Tea
