= Abar (album) =

আবার

Studio album by Black
- Released: July 10, 2008
- Recorded: 2006–08
- Studios: Bengal Music Studio, Dhaka, Bangladesh
- Genre: Alternative rock
- Length: 42:39
- Label: G-Series
- Producer: Iqbal Asif Jewel

Black chronology
উৎসবের পর (After the Festival) (2003)	আবার (2008)	Black (2011)

আবার (Again) is the third studio album by Bangladeshi rock band Black, released on July 10, 2008. After a full five-year hiatus the band released the album under the sponsorship of Warid Telecom. A gala was held for the album's release at Dhaka's Bashundhara City shopping mall, with the band performing various songs from the album with collaborations from other notable artists. The album was said to have sold 5,000 copies three hours after launch and is considered to be Black's most critically acclaimed album and a landmark record for the rock music scene of Bangladesh.

== Track listing ==
No.	Title	Length
1.	"Manush Pakhir Gaan"	4:06
2.	"Abar"	3:40
3.	"Abohoman"	4:51
4.	"Obosh"	4:14
5.	"Shorobiddho"	4:10
6.	"Ei Gaan"	3:39
7.	"Na Thaka Jibon"	4:10
8.	"Korun"	3:52
9.	"Chinno"	4:21
10.	"Keno"	4:37
Total length:		42:39

== Production team ==
- Recorded By: Shuvo, Saad & Iqbal Asif Jewel
- Recorded At: BENGAL MUSIC STUDIO & NOT OF THIS EARTH
- Mixed & Mastered By: Iqbal Asif Jewel
- Photography: Khademul Insan

== Line up ==
- Jon – vocals, guitar
- Jahan – lead guitar
- Sagar – bass
- Tony – drums

== Guest musicians ==
- Gary Kanter: Trumpet (Track 4)
- Iqbal Asif Jewel: Key & Effects (Track 1, 3, 4, 8 & 9), Bass & Guitar Solo (Track 3), Guitar Interlude (Track 8)
