= Tanjin Tisha =

Bangladeshi actress, model and television presenter

- তানজিন তিশা
- Born: Tanjin Nahar Tisha
- Occupations: Actress; Model; Dancer
- Years active: 2011–present
- Awards: Full list

TikTok information
- Page: Tanjin Tisha
- Followers: 5.2M
- Last updated: 3 December 2024

Tanjin Nahar Tisha is a Bangladeshi actress, model and dancer. She started modeling after dancing as a child, then began her acting career in television dramas. She won Meril Prothom Alo Awards in Best Newcomer category for her performance in the drama U-Turn.

== Background and career ==
She started her career through fashion shoot and ramp modeling in 2011. Tisha first modeled in an advertising campaign of Robi directed by Amitabh Reza Chowdhury in 2012. That was the turning point of her career. She walked the ramp for Tresemme Fashion Show at Bangabandhu International Conference Centre on 18 September 2015. She renewed her contract with Infinix for 2022. She lost her father Abdul Kashem to cancer (d. 2022).

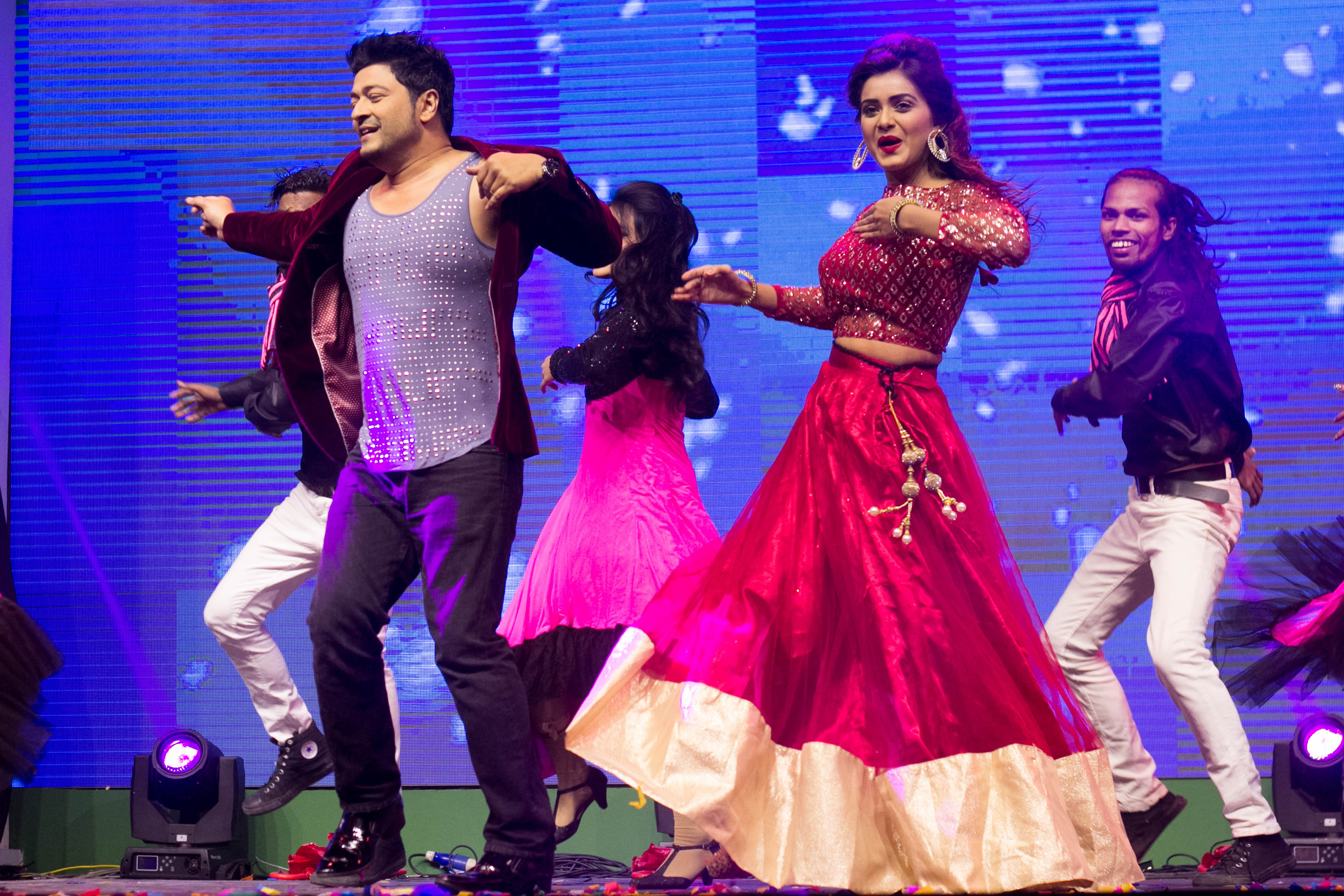
Tanjin Tisha

== Works ==
=== Films ===
Key
†	Denotes films that have not yet been released

Year	Film	Role	Notes	Ref.
2017	Tumi Robe Nirobe	Urmila	Debut film	
2025	Bhalobashar Morshum †	Hiya	Filming; Debut Indian Bengali film	

=== Television ===
Year	Drama	Notes
2014	U-Turn	won Meril Prothom Alo Awards in Best Newcomer category
2014	Apon Kotha	aired on NTV on Mothers' Day
2014	Moyna Tia	drama serial aired on Asian TV
2014	Sonali Roddur	
2014	Kath Golaper Bosonto	
2015	Palta Haowa	drama serial aired on BanglaVision
2015	Omimansito Sotto	aired on BTV on Eid-ul-Adha
2015	Megh Pakhi Eka	aired on Bangla Vision on Eid-ul-Adha
2015	Ei Sohore Meyera Eka	six episode serial aired on ATN Bangla on Eid-ul-Adha
2015	Ochena Bondhu	aired on ATN Bangla on Eid-ul-Adha
2015	Korban Alir Korbani	appeared first time as a village girl and aired on Asian TV on Eid-ul-Adha
2015	Green Card	aired on Asian TV
2015	Pendu Love	aired on NTV
2015	Chocolate Boy	aired on Boishakhi on Eid-ul-Adha
2015	Shadow	aired on SA TV on Eid-ul-Adha
2016	Blue Print	Channel i
2016	Cheradeep	
2018	Amar Pokke Tomake Rakha Somvob Na	
2018	Bari Fera	
2018	Bed Scene	
2018	Biker	
2018	Brishti Hoye Ele Tumi	
2018	Chelerao Kade	
2018	Choto Golper Sesh Pristha	
2018	Full Hata Half Shirt	
2018	Lalai	
2018	Mitu Tomar Jonno	
2018	Ontormil	Maasranga TV
2018	Prem Chobi	
2019	Doodle of Love	
2019	Obuj Diner Golpo	
2019	Shishir Bindu	
2019	Purusher Kanna	
2019	X Boyfriend	
2019	BreakUp	Eid-ul-Fitr
2019	The End	Eid Drama
2019	X Wife	
2019	Mobile Chor	
2019	Hotat dekha	
2019	I am honest	
2021	House No 96	
2021	Sahosika	Dekha give ki? the Kokhono na Kokhono
2021	Banker Girlfriend	
2021	Pappu Wed's Pinky	
2021	Hello Shunchen	
2021	Ekjon Mayaboti	
2021	Modern Couple	
2021	Ei Obelay	
2021	Rikhshaw Girl	
2021	Silence	
2021	Antahin	
2023	Kanjus	
2023	Antahin	
2023	Kothay khuji Tare	
2023	Memoir of love	
2023	Wife of the year	
2023	Doa	
2023	Nil oporajita	

=== Music videos ===
Year	Name	Artist	Notes
2012	"Chokheri Poloke"	Rizvi Wahid & Shuvomita	
2015	"Bolte Bolte Cholte Cholte"	Imran Mahmudul	
2018	"Tomar Akash"	Shusmita Anis	
2020	"Smritir Fanush"	Tahsan Rahman Khan & Shusmita Anis	

== Awards and nominations ==
Year	Awards	Category	Result
2014	Meril-Prothom Alo Awards	Best Newcomer (Public Choice)	Won
2017	RTV Fashion Runway Awards	Best Look	Won
2018	Shako Telefilm Awards	Best Actress (TV)	Won
2018	Meril-Prothom Alo Awards	Best Actress (TV)	Nominated
2019	Qinetic Network Awards	Most Viewed Actress	Won
2019	CJFB Performance Award	Best Actress (Critics Choice)	Won
2020	RTV Star Awards	Best TV Actress	Nominated
2021	Real Heroes Awards	Best TV Actress	Won
2021	Bangladesh Excellence Awards	Best Influential Actress	Won
2022	MN Multimedia Iconic Awards	Best Iconic TV Actress	Won
2022	Bangladesh Women's Inspirational Awards	Best Actress	Won
2022	Women's Day Special Awards	Best TV Actress	Won
2022	Binge Gala Awards	Recognition for Shikol Web-series	Won
2022	Dhallywood Film and Music Awards	Best TV Actress	Won
2023	BIFA Awards	Best Female Actress (TV)	Won
2023	JCI Women's Inspirational Award	Best Female Actress (TV)	Won
2024	BIFA Awards	Best TV Actress	Won
2026	BIFA Awards	Best TV Actress for Putuler Biye	Won
