= Black (band Black album) =

Studio album by Black
- Released: August 21, 2011
- Genre: Alternative rock
- Label: G-Series
- Producer: Black

Black chronology
Abar (2008)	Black (2011)

Black is the fourth studio album by Bangladeshi rock band Black. In 2009 Black announced on their official Facebook page that they had started to work on their fourth studio album and it would be a self-titled album. Work on the album properly started after Rafiqul Ahsan Titu (ex-Aashor) joined the band as the permanent bass player after Shahriar Shagor left the band. Black stated, they had plans to release the album on the Eid-ul-Azha of 2010, but due to other commitments of the band members and tight scheduling they were unable to succeed. After a few more changes of speculated release dates the band finally announced the official release date, August 21, 2011. According to the band, the album contains the heaviest possible music they have yet made. The first single off the album was "Aajo...", its music video premiered at YouTube in September 2011.

== Track listing ==
No.	Title	Length
1.	"Haat Barao"	5:23
2.	"Paper-Radio-TV"	4:38
3.	"Amar Prithibi (Re-take)"	4:28
4.	"Attokendrik"	4:37
5.	"Mumursho Rupkotha"	4:33
6.	"Aajo..."	4:21
7.	"Nilgiri"	3:44
8.	"Jiboner Ba-Pashe"	4:47
9.	"Purono Shei Din'er Kotha"	3:20
10.	"Uposhonghar"	3:13
11.	"Ekjon"	5:49

== Recording Process ==
The band started working on the album in the month of November, 2010 at Bengal Music Studios in Dhaka, and was planned from the beginning to be entirely recorded live. In achieving the vision for the album's "live" nature, additional guitar work was tackled by then vocalist Jon Kabir. The band hired Shuvo for engineering the album's sound with Black producing it themselves.

== Critical reception ==
On a review at the Daily Prothom Alo, popular Bangladeshi musician Bappa Mazumder praised the band's new experimentation in the compositions like Attokendrik and Nilgiri. However, he believed the sound mixing could have been more polished.

== Find Black ==
Before the release of the album, Black held a contest on the eve of the album release in which fans had to find the band somewhere inside Dhaka.

== Production team ==
- Recorded By: Shuvo
- Recorded At: Bengal Music Studio
- Mixed & Mastered by: Shuvo

== Line up ==
- Jon Kabir – vocals, guitar
- Mushfeque Jahan – lead guitar
- Rafiqul Ahsan Titu – bass
- Mehmood Tony – drums

== Additional Musicians ==
- Foad Nasser Babu – Keyboards on Attokendrik (track 4)
- Md. Motiar Rahman – Sarangi on Purono Shei Din'er Kotha (track 9)
