= Tasnuva Tisha =

Bangladeshi TV and film actress

- তাসনুভা তিশা
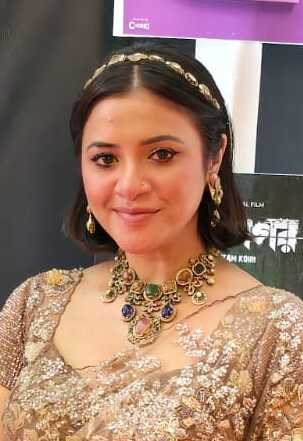
- Tasnuva Tisha_Chorki_2026_Program
- Born: 8 December 1991, Age 34
- Education: Eden Mohila College, Shamsul Hoque Khan School and College
- Occupations: Actor, model, housewife
- Years active: 2013 - present
- Spouse: S.H.Shahansha

| notable_works = | spouse =

(m. 2024)

}} Tasnuva Tisha (born 8 December 1991) is a Bangladeshi actress and model. She is known for acting in Opekkha web series and TV dramas.

== Early life ==
Tasnuva Tisha was born on 8 December. Her father is a businessman and mother is a housewife. She studied at Shamsul Haq Khan School and College then enrolled at Eden Mohila College and graduated from there. She has two siblings. She lives in Banasree, a residential area in Dhaka.

== Career ==
Tisha started her modeling career in 2013. She started her acting career with Mostafa Kamal Raj's TV drama Lal Kham Vs Neel Kham. In 2020, She worked with Manoj Pramanik in an advertisement for Banglalink. She advertised for Royal Cafe. Her music video "Tumi Eto Bhalo Ken" was released on 18 February 2020. She starred with Sumit Sengupta in another music video called 'Pure Love'.

Her notable TV dramas and telefilms are 'Ekdin Chutti Chahe', 'Off Screen', 'Love Guru Dotcom', 'Dost Dushman', 'Jhalmuri', 'Prem Karte Ichchhuk', 'Love Loss', 'Apeksha', 'A'. What a game ',' I want you ',' A little ',' I remember ',' I remember ',' Story of Arup ',' Hi Zvin ',' Go tell the bird ',' To new address ',' Pull of mind ',' Feelings', 'Favorite Communication', 'Avengers and the Great Loser', 'Goodnight', 'Mind in Mind', 'Fairy tale for Cloud Girl', 'You are a star in the sky', 'River of some oblivion', 'You are a stranger' etc.

She starred in web series such as August 14, Vacation of Doubt, Out of Network. In 2021, she starred in a web film called Batch 2003. She also starred in a film called Chal.

== Personal life ==
Her first child was a daughter. Her first husband is Farzanul Haque; they married in 2015 but divorced. She married her second husband, Prince Asker, in 2022. The couple had a baby girl in 2023.

== Television ==
=== Web series ===
Year	Series	Role	Notes	Ref.
2026	Brazentina	TBA	Web series on iScreen	

- Lal Kham Bonam Neel Kham (2014)
- Off-Screen (2014)
- Jogajog Golojog
- Dost Dushman (2015)
- Ami Tumi Tumi Ami (2016)
- Amar Ekla Akash
- Astha (2017)
- Cheyechhi Tomai (2017)
- Premnagar (2017)
- Sonar Shekol (2017)
- Torun Turkey (2017)
- Dekha (2018)
- Golpogula Amader
- Japte Thakuk Prem (2018)
- Laboratory (2018)
- Meghbalikar Janya Rukatha (2018)
- Megher Canvas (2018)
- Obak (2018)
- Avengers and The Great Loser (2019)
- Bhol Bodol (2019)
- Ek Tukro Megh Ek Tukro Brishhti (2019)
- Eshan (2019)
- Mofijer Lifestyle (2019)
- Premer Dushto Chokro (2019)
- Remote Control (2019)
- Bodh (2020)
- Rupali Josnay (2020)
- Shohoj Premer Golpo (2020)
- Anondodhoni (2021)
- Baker Khoni (2021)
- Bhul Josnay Ekotre Hetechilam (2021)
- Biye Kore Paliye (2021)
- Chaya Shikari (2021)
- Durer Somoy (2021)
- Facebook (2021)
- Flashback (2021)
- Friendbook (2021)
- Chatok (2022)
- Horijon Polly (2022)
- Maa Baba Bhai Bon (2022)
- Ora Tin Jon (2022)
- Sheshtateo Tumi-e Chhile (2022)
- Taka (2022)
- Three Friends (2022)
- Morichika Mon (2023)

== Awards ==
Year	Award	Category	Designated action	The result
2021	Safekeeper Channel I Digital Media Award 2020	Best Actress	August 14	Won
