= Black (Bangladeshi band) =

Bangladeshi rock band

Black ব্ল্যাক
- Origin: Dhaka, Bangladesh
- Genres: Alternative rock, grunge, rock, post-grunge
- Years active: 1998–present
- Label: G-Series
- Members: Khademul Jahan; Charlz Amit Francis; Farhan Tanveer; Ishan Hossain
- Past members: Jon Kabir; Tahsan Rahman Khan; Ahsan Titu; Ashifur Rahman; Mahmudul Karim Miraz; Shahriar Sagar; Asif Haque; Rubayet Chowdhury; Mehmood Afridi Tony

Black is a Bangladeshi alternative rock band formed in 1998 in Dhaka. It was originally formed by Jon Kabir (lead singer, rhythm guitars), Khademul Jahan (lead guitars), and Mehmood Tony (drums). They were soon joined by Mahmudul Karim Miraz (bass guitars), and in 2000, Tahsan Rahman Khan (keyboards and vocals).

After signing a contract with G-Series, Black broke through the mainstream with their debut studio album "Amar Prithibi" (2002). Since then, they have released five studio albums and have appeared in some mixed albums. Their latest album (Unomanush) was released in 2016 by G-Series. They were one of key rock bands of the 2000s along with Nemesis and Stentorian, who popularized alternative rock music in Bangladesh.

== History ==
=== Formation and Early Days (1997–2000) ===
Childhood friends and schoolmates Jahangir "Jon" Kabir, Khademul Jahan, and Tony Vincent (Mehmood Afridi Tony) always shared a similar passion for music. Their time was mostly spent at each other's houses listening to records from bands such as Pearl Jam, Stone Temple Pilots, Soundgarden. Pearl Jam's debut album Ten had a profound effect on the three and is said to have been the tipping point at which they decided to take up music professionally. After convincing each other about their musical skills the trio decided to form a band and soon enough they were jamming at their friend's homes. Initially, they decided to name their group "Dope Smuglazz", as a wink to the irreverent parental fears of rock music and its supposed concurrent substance abuse, but soon enough shifted to the name "Black" by a suggestion from a friend, classmate, and future band member Asif Haque. The band would then be introduced to Zubair Hossain Imon, an old acquaintance of guitar player Asif, whom the band considers to be "The Stalwart Member" and their "Philosophical Mentor". He is widely known for helping the band with their songwriting, often directly contributing words and ideas. Black was formed in 1998 with the five members of Jon in vocals, Jahan in guitar, Tony in drums, Asif for additional guitar work, and Tamzid Siddiq Spondon in bass. Soon enough Spondon and Asif parted ways with the band to follow their own interests. Tahsan Rahman Khan then joined the band as the keyboardist in 2000. Their first ever recorded track was Blues n Rod which was released later in a mixed album.

=== Amar Prithibi (2001–2002) ===
In 2002, Black released their debut album titled Amar Prithibi. Work began on the album in late 2001, between which they had also released several other singles in various compilation albums including their popular single "Chena Dukho" from Charpotro. They completed the album in the fall of 2002. This album includes some of their classical hit songs like "Amra", "Amar Prithibi" and "Kothay". The album also displayed Black's earlier heavy music influences in songs like "Kobor" and "Andhokarer Pashe". During the same year, they appeared on Bangladesh National Television (BTV), to perform their title track "Amar Prithibi" on the "Pop-show" Program.

=== Utshober Por and "Offbeat" (2003–2004) ===
Shortly after the release of Amar Prithibi, Black started working on their second studio album under the title Utshober Por. This album was completed in a much shorter time since the band already had enough material from Amar Prithibi for a second album. The album was a departure from Black's usually heavy and alternative styling and instead focused on more mellow and folk-oriented tunes and dealt with more self-exploratory writing. The album includes hit singles like "Utshober Por" and "Shlok", which received frequent playback in commercial radio stations.

Considering the sudden emergence of piracy in music, the album had sold well enough to have superseded Amar Prithibi. The album was received fairly well by critics despite having sold so well. Soon after releasing Utshober Por, the band took a stab at acting. The members of Black were cast as a ragtag group of street urchins in the teleplay "Offbeat". The soundtrack to the song "She Je Boshe Ache" had been a collaborative effort between Black and Arnob.

=== Death of Imran Ahmed Choudhury Mobin ===
On 20 April 2005, returning home after successfully completing a tour in Chittagong. The bus in which the band was on, crashed near a ditch on the road. It caused the death of Imran Ahmed Choudhury Mobin, a prominent sound engineer in the Bangladesh music industry and a close friend of the band and their primary lyricist. Band members Jon, Jahan and Tahsan suffered minor bruises and cuts while Tony and Miraz had to be hospitalised. The members of the band announced a hiatus until further notice. Miraz had been diagnosed with a permanently damaged patella and had to leave the band indefinitely. Tahsan also left right after because of the incident and also to focus more on his personal career.

=== Abar (2007–2008) ===
After a three-year hiatus Black released their third studio album Abar at 10 July 2008. Under the sponsorship of Warid Telecom a press conference was held at Bashundhara City shopping mall, followed by a gala event for the album's launch. A documentary chronicling Black's career, including Imran Ahmed Choudhury Mobin's death, was shown and released publicly prior to Abar being launched. It was produced under Black's supervision and released through the G-Series label. The documentary features interviews by notable artists and figures amongst the Bangladesh music industry such as, Isha Khan Duray, Azam Khan, Saidus Sumon, Sheikh Monirul Alam Tipu and Iqbal Asif Jewel. This album was stated as one of the most commercially successful album in the history of Bangladeshi rock music.

=== Black (2009–2011) ===
In late 2009, Black stated on their official Facebook page they had started working on their fourth studio album since June and that it is planned to be self-titled, a first for the band. In mid 2010, bass player Shahriar Sagar parted with the band paving the way for former Aashor member Rafiqul Ahsan Titu to take the place. Upon his joining vocalist Jon Kabir says:

Its like having someone like Robert DeLeo (referring to the Stone Temple Pilots bass player) take time off of his obviously busy schedule and jam with the mere mortals we are. Every piece of music that he brings in leaves the rest of us feeling flaccid ... musically speaking of course, in short he has been a tremendous and overwhelming influence on us and fits more than perfectly in our musically misfit jigsaw puzzle

Black released their 4th album, Black on 21 August 2011. Just after that Jon Kabir took a break from the band for an indefinite time of period. He stated that he along with his wife is going for higher studies in the end of 2012. As a part of that, he's getting prepared and in the meantime Black would perform with guest vocalists in concerts if they want to do so. Besides Jon also stated via Black's official Facebook fan page that he was working on a side project on music but not forming a band neither going solo. After a couple of months Jon opened a fan page on Facebook named "Indalo". It stated that he was working with Dio Haque from Nemesis on drums, Zubair Hasan from Aashor on guitar, Rafiqul Ahsan Titu of Black on bass.

=== Unomanush (2013-Present) ===
Black released their fifth studio album, named Unomanush, on 26 November 2016, under G series. There are a total of eight songs in this album. All the songs are recorded in Acoustic Artz Studio. The album was officially launched at RCC with the physical CD. Eventually this is first album recorded by the newly included members Rubayet Chowdhury on vocals and Charlz Francis on bass guitar. Three of the songs have already been released with the music video "আক্ষেপ", "গহিনে" and "অধরা".

In 2021, Rubayet who sang on the album "Unomanush" left the band because of migration to Canada. He was replaced by vocalist Ishan Hossain (formerly of a band called Naive) the same year and has remained the lead vocalist ever since.

In 2024, former member of the band, Tahsan Rahman Khan, teased a possible reunion with the other former members (Jon, Tony & Miraz) of the band on his Facebook page. As a result on May 10, 2024 the band reunited with all the original members and played a reunion show. The event was one night only. Now only Guitarist Jahan remains as the only original founding member in the band.

== Playing style ==
Their playing style is heavily influenced by grunge and alternative bands like Alice in Chains, Nirvana, and Soundgarden; heavy guitar riffs and complex drum beats. Before and during Amar Prithibi, their sound was very heavy but it was also balanced with melodious keyboard progressions played by Tahsan. The title track of their first album which is their most popular song to date, incorporated the sitar.

During Utshober Por they started experimenting with more new sounds like folk. Their next three albums and singles were much more heavier and is still developing with their drastic lineup changes.

== Discography ==
=== Studio albums ===
- "Amar Prithibi" (2002)
- "Utshober Por" (2003)
- "Abar" (2008)
- "Black" (2011)
- "Unomanush" (2016)

=== Mixed albums ===
==== Charpotro 2000 ====
- Chena Dukkho

==== Onushilon 2001 ====
- Smriti
- Obinishshor

==== Projonmo 2002 ====
- Blues n Rod

==== Din Bodol 2003 ====
- Ashirbad - ABC (with Artcell and Cryptic Fate)

==== Agontuk 1 2003 ====
- Opolap

==== Lokayoto 2004 ====
- Shotto

==== Agontuk 2 2004 ====
- Shokarto Upokul

==== Swapnochura 1 2004 ====
- Shey Je Boshe Ache ft. Elita Karim
- Daak

==== Agontuk 3 2005 ====
- The Evening

==== Swapnochura 2 2006 ====
- Ondo

==== Underground 1 2006 ====
- 35

==== Swapnochura 3 2007 ====
- Ekaronei

==== Live Now 2007 ====
- Ei Ami

==== Rock 101 2008 ====
- Shobdo

==== Rock 202 2009 ====
- Tumi Ki Sara Dibe

==== Rock 505 2010 ====
- Bhranto Shopno

==== Cholo Bangladesh 2011 ====
- 2011

==== Rock 606 2011 ====
- Fera

==== Hatiar2 2012 ====
- Chheleti

==== Swapnochura 4 2014 ====
- Kar Jonnoe

==== Rock 909 2015 ====
- Omor

==== Shongshodhon (Kha) 2017 ====
- Porajoyer Sheshe

==== Single 2019 ====
- Dhushor

==== Single 2020 ====
- Quarantine Project (Opolap + Obinoshshor)

==== Single 2023 ====
- Shomantoral

== Members ==
=== Present members ===
- Ishan Hossain – Vocals, Rhythm guitars (2021–present)
- Khademul Jahan – Lead guitars (1998–present)
- Charles Francis – Bass (2014–present)
- Farhan Tanveer – Drums (2018–present)

=== Past members ===
- Jon Kabir – vocals, guitars (1998–2012)
- Ahsan Titu – bass (2011–2014)
- Ashifur Rahman Chowdhury – vocals, guitars (2013–2014)
- Mashuk Islam Khan – vocals (2012)
- Tahsan Rahman Khan – vocals, keyboards (2000–2005)
- Mahmudul Karim Miraz – bass (2001–2005)
- Bassbaba Sumon – bass (2005–2006)
- Shahriar Sagar – bass (2006–2010)
- Asif Haque – guitars (1998–1999)
- Rubayet Chowdhury – vocals, rhythm guitars (2015–2021)
- Mehmood Afridi Tony – Drums, Percussion, Backing vocals (1998–2016)

== Music videos ==
- "অন্ধ (Andho)" performed by Black (2002)
- "উৎসবের পর (Utshober Por)" performed by Black (2004)
- "কোথায় (Kothay)" performed by Black (2004)
- "আবার (Abar)" performed by Black (2008)
- "৩৫ (35)" performed by Black (2008)
- "আজো... (Ajo...)" performed by Black (2011)
- "Akkhep" performed by Black (2016)
- "Gohine" performed by Black (2017)
- "Dhushor" performed by Black (2019)
- "Quarantine Project" performed by Black (2020)
- "Shomantoral" performed by Black (2023)
