= Zakia Bari Mamo =

Bangladeshi actress and model

- জাকিয়া বারী মম
- Born: 19 December 1985 (age 40)
- Education: Jahangirnagar University
- Occupations: Actress and model
- Years active: 2006–present
- Title: Lux Channel I Superstar 2006
- Spouses: Ezaz Munna (m. 2010; div. 2013); Shihab Shaheen (m. 2015; div. 2020)
- Children: 1
- Awards: See full list

Zakia Bari Mamo (born 19 December 1985) is a Bangladeshi actress and model. She gained recognition after winning the Lux Channel I Superstar beauty pageant in 2006. Mamo made her film debut in Daruchini Dip in 2007, for which she received critical acclaim and won the Best Actress award at the 32nd Bangladesh National Film Awards. She later appeared in Prem Korbo Tomar Sathe in 2014 and Chuye Dile Mon in 2015.

== Early life ==
Mamo was born on 19 December 1985. In 1995, she won Notun Kuri, the largest cultural program for children in Bangladesh, which was aired on Bangladesh Television. She rose to nationwide fame after winning the Lux Channel I Superstar pageant. Mamo pursued higher education at Jahangirnagar University, where she completed both her bachelor's and master's degrees in drama and dramatics.

== Career ==
Mamo made her acting debut in the 2007 film Daruchini Dip, where her performance was widely praised. For this role, she won the Best Actress award at the 32nd Bangladesh National Film Awards. After a long break from cinema, she returned in 2014 with the film Prem Korbo Tomar Sathe. In 2015, she starred in Chuye Dile Mon, alongside Arefin Shuvo.

== Personal life ==
Mamo married film producer Ejaz Munna in 2010. Together they had a son, Udbhas. The couple got divorced in 2013. Mamo later married filmmaker Shihab Shaheen in November 2015; the couple publicly revealed their marriage on their fourth wedding anniversary. They got divorced in September 2020.

== Works ==
Films

Year	Title	Role	Notes	Ref.
2007	Daruchini Dip	Jori	Debut film; Winner - Bangladesh National Film Awards for Best Actress	
2014	Prem Korbo Tomar Sathe	Shopna		
2015	Chuye Dile Mon	Nila		
2018	Alta Banu	Alta		
2018	Dahan	Maya		
2018	Shopner Ghor	Maria		
2022	Agamikal	Rupa		
2023	Ora 7 Jon	Aporna		
2023	Radio			
2024	Max Ki Gun	CBI officer Zakia Khan	Debut Hindi film	
2024	840	DC Officer		
2025	Ondhokarer Gaan	Rumali	Webfilm on Binge	
2026	Bonolota Express	Afia		
2026	Master	Jharna	World premiere at the 17th London Indian Film Festival (LIFF)	

Television dramas

Year	Title	Director
2012	Fushka	Nuzhat Alvi Ahmed
2012	Ekti Suitcase Abong	Ishmot Ara Choudhury Shanti
2013	Nil Projapoti	Shihab Shaheen
2013	Lukochuri	Shahin Kabir Tutul
2013	Nilpori Nilanjona	Shihab Shahin
2013	Mayer Jonno	
2013	Meyeti Kotha Bolebe Prem Koribena	Salauddin Lavlu
2013	Rongtuli	Ilias Khan Tomal
2013	Chapkhanai Ekta Bhoot Thake	Shokal Ahmed
2013	Eclipse	Mabrur Rashid Bannah
2013	Shodho Ekta Minute	Ziauddin Alam
2013	Bhalobashar Chotokhoron	Shihab Shahin
2015	Utshorgo	Mizanur Rahman Aryan
	Jole Tar Chaya	Mahmudur Rahman Hime
	Feelings	Mahmudur Rahman Hime
	Shesh Porjonto	Shihab Shaheen
	Jalshaghor	Jakaria Showkhin

Web series

Year	Title	Role	OTT	Director	Notes
2019	Beauty and The Bullet	ASP Tamanna	Bioscope	Animesh Aich	
2019	Chena Pother Oporichita		YouTube	Shihab Shaheen	
2021	Contract	Meena	ZEE5	Tanim Noor and Krishnendu Chattopadhyay	
2021	Bilaap		Cinematic	Sunny Sanwar and Faisal Ahmed	
2021	Platform		Bongo BD	Sarder Rokon	
2021	Mohanagar	Shahana Huda	Hoichoi	Ashfaque Nipun	
2022	9 April		Binge	Kaushik Shankar Das	

== Awards ==
Daruchini Dip won the National Film Awards total seven categories in the year of 2007.

- Winner Best Actress selected : 'Zakia Bari Momo' 2007
- Winner Best Supporting Actor Female (Bangladesh) for Mohanagar in 2021.
