= Ping Pong Entertainment =

- Company type: Film Production
- Industry: Entertainment
- Founded: 2014
- Headquarters: Dhaka, Bangladesh
- Key people: Shukla Banik
- Products: Motion pictures
- Services: Studio production, marketing and distribution

Ping Pong Entertainment, established in 2014, is a Bangladesh-based film production and distribution company. The company specializes in film and television productions. Shukla Banik is the current chairman of the company.

== Films produced by Ping Pong Entertainment ==
Following are the list of notable films produced by Ping Pong Entertainment.

Year	Film	Director	Cast
2014	Taarkata	Mohammad Mostafa Kamal Raz	Arifin Shuvoo, Mim, Moushumi, Dr. Ezaz, Faruque Ahmed
2016	Ice Cream	Redoan Rony	Sariful Razz, Nazifa Tushi, Kumar Uday, ATM Shamsuzzaman, Omar Sani, Diti
2022	Birotto	Saidul Islam Rana	Emon, Nishat Nawar Salwa, Intekhab Dinar, Nipun, Ahsan Habib Nasim

== See also ==
- Tiger Media Limited
- Jaaz Multimedia
- The Abhi Pictures
