= Sadia Ayman =

Bangladeshi actress

- সাদিয়া আয়মান
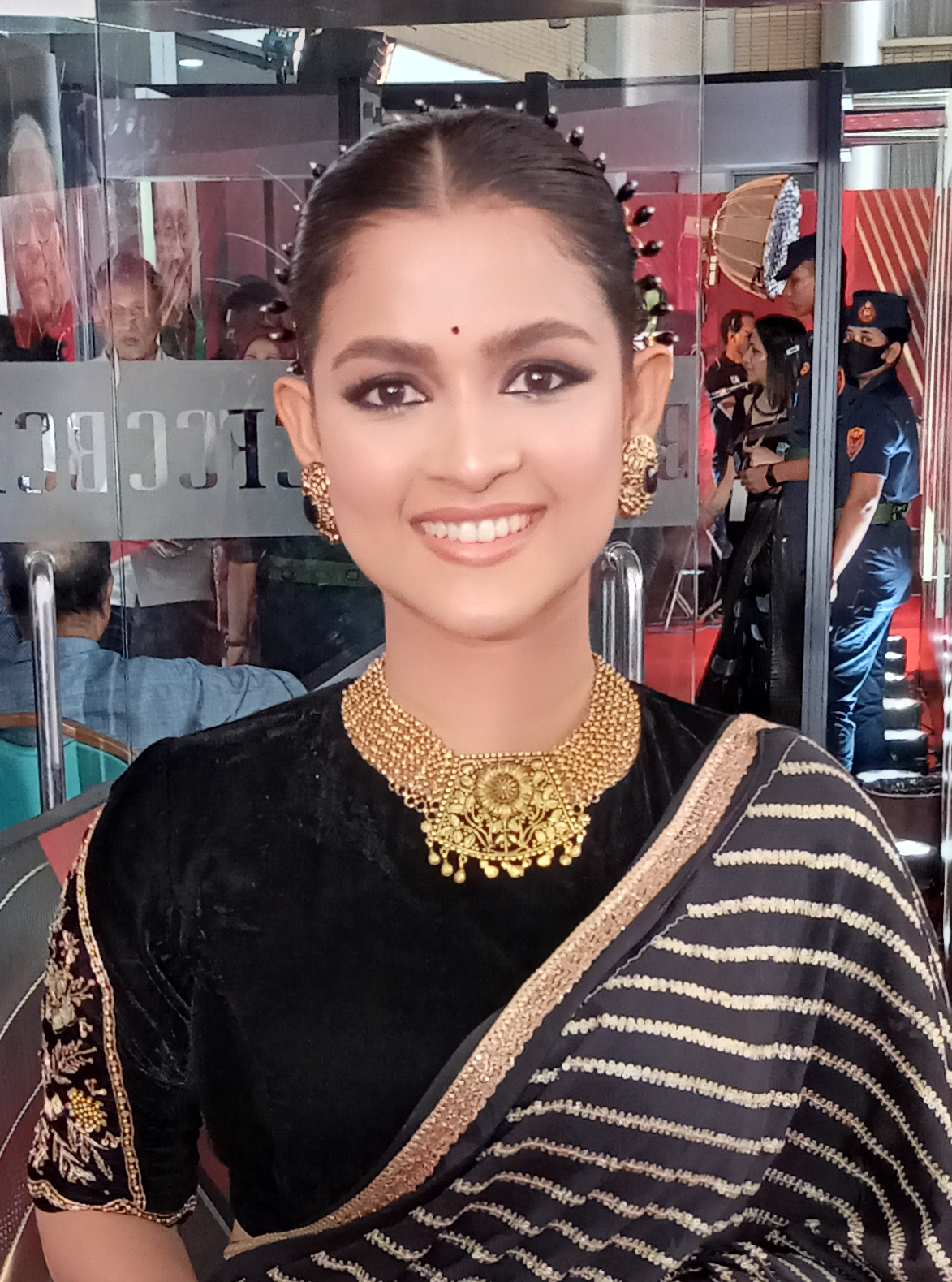
- Sadia in 2025
- Born: 17 March 1999 (age 27); Barishal, Bangladesh
- Education: East West University
- Occupations: Television actress; film actress; model
- Years active: 2019–present

Fatema Tasnim Sadia (born 17 March 1999), popularly known as Sadia Ayman, is a Bangladeshi film and television actress who works mainly in Bangladeshi television dramas and Dhallywood cinema. She made her television drama debut in To Be Wife (2019) directed by Imraul Rafat, she won a BCRA Award for Best actress for her debut web film Mayashalik (2022) and she made her big screen film debut in Kajolrekha (2024).

She has been the brand ambassador of 'Boro Plus Neem Facewash' of India's popular cosmetic brand 'Boro Plus'. She also brand ambassador of Xiaomi Bangladesh.

== Early life and education ==
Ayman was born on 17 March 1999 in Barishal. She studied at East West University and University of Dhaka, she has two brothers.

== Career ==
Ayman started her acting career with the television drama To Be Wife in 2019 directed by Imraul Rafat. Later, she continued acting in many popular television dramas including, Aaj Akashe Chand Nei, Brishtir Opekkhai, Hashi, Medicine Man, Nirer Pakhi, Tui Chhara Mon Bhalo Nei, Sada Payra and Ek Ta Chhele Moner Anginate. In 2022, she has also won the BCRA Award - 2022 for Best Actress (Critics) from the Bangladesh Cultural Reporters Association (BCRA) for Mayashalik (2022). In 2023, she acted in a webfilm produced by Bengal Multimedia and directed by Masum Shahriar Shopnovuk (2023) and she also appeared OTT works as Kabadi (2023) released on Bioscope and Internsheep (2023) on Chorki. Her debut film is Kajolrekha (2024) directed by Giasuddin Selim.

== Filmography ==
=== Film ===
Key
| † | Denotes films that have not yet been released |

| Year | Title | Role | Notes | Ref. |
|---|---|---|---|---|
| 2024 | Kajolrekha | Young Kajolrekha | Debut film | |
| 2025 | Utshob | Young Jesmin | | |

=== Webfilm ===
| Year | Title | Role | Notes | Ref. |
|---|---|---|---|---|
| 2022 | Mayashalik | Sara | Debut Webfilm; released on Binge | |
| 2023 | Shopnovuk | Sumi | Released on RTV | |
| 2024 | Bibhabori | Nitu | Released on DeeptoPlay | |
| 2026 | Meu | Raha | Released on Chorki | |
| 2026 | Love Sitter | Hridi | Released on Bongo BD | |

=== Web series ===
| Year | Title | Role | OTT platform | Notes | Ref. |
|---|---|---|---|---|---|
| 2023 | Kabadi | Mira | Bioscope | Debut web series | |
| 2023 | Internsheep | Manisha | Chorki | | |
| 2023 | Procholito | Anna | Chorki | | |
| 2025 | Bohemian Ghora | Shundori Khatun | Hoichoi | | |
| 2026 | Silver Sadia | Sadia | YouTube | Micro-drama series | |

== Television ==
| Year | Title | Role | Director | Ref |
|---|---|---|---|---|
| 2021 | Kobi + Kusum | | Shetu Arif | |
| 2024 | Keu Keu Theke Jai | | Shishir Ahmed | |

== Award and nominations ==
| Year | Award | Category | Work | Result | Ref |
|---|---|---|---|---|---|
| 2022 | Bangladesh Cultural Reporters Association Award (BCRA) | Best Actress (Critics' Choice) | Mayashalik | Won | |
| 2022 | Bangladesh Excellence Awards | Newcomer Actress (TV) | Prem Kahini | Won | |
| 2024 | Meril Prothom Alo Awards | Best Actress | Kajolrekha | Nominated | |
| 2025 | Meril Prothom Alo Awards | Best Film Actress | Utshob | Nominated | |
| 2025 | Meril Prothom Alo Awards | Best Actress (OTT) | Bohemian Ghora | Nominated | |
| 2025 | BIFA Awards | Best TV Actress | Jokhon Tokhon | Won | |
| 2026 | BIFA Awards | Best OTT Actress (popular) | Bohemian Ghora | Won | |
