= Yash Rohan =

Bangladeshi actor, model and director

- ইয়াশ রোহান
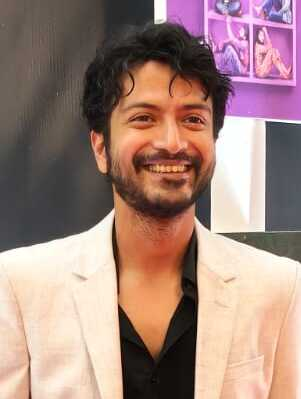
- Yash Rohan in 2026
- Born: 22 December 1994 (age 31); Netrokona
- Education: BRAC University
- Occupations: Actor; model; director
- Years active: 2015–present
- Works: See list
- Parents: Naresh Bhuiyan (father); Shilpi Sharkar Apu (mother)

Yash Rohan (born 22 December 1994) is a Bangladeshi actor, model, and director. He began his career in 2015 with short films which he directed and also acted in. His film debut in Swapnajaal (2018) earned praise, and he went on to gain further recognition with starring roles in Networker Baire (2021) and Poran (2022), which is one of the highest-grossing Bangladeshi films of all time.

== Early life and family ==
Yash Rohan was born on 22 December 1994 in a Mahishya family Netrokona. His father Naresh Bhuiyan is an actor and photojournalist, and mother Shilpi Sarkar Apu is a playwright and actress, best known for her work in the 1985 television drama Ei Shob Din Ratri. According to Rohan, although both his parents belonged to the entertainment arena, he initially had no plans to pursue a career in acting. On a television programme, he revealed that he had tremendous fascination towards physics in his childhood and aspired to be a physicist on growing up.

Rohan's ancestral house is in Netrokona. He follows Hinduism. He has a degree in engineering from BRAC university.

== Career ==
Rohan directed and appeared in a short film named Doob in 2015. The following year, he directed another short film, The Red Note. He made his acting debut with Giasuddin Selim's Swapnajaal in 2018. Fahmim Ferdous of The Daily Star noted him for "giv[ing] a fairly tight performance for a newcomer". Rohan later revealed that he despised his performance in Swapnajaal and never gave a proper watch to the film, but an unexpected positive reception encouraged him to continue his work. In 2018, Rohan also made a cameo appearance in Iti, Tomari Dhaka, and featured in the web film Rupkotha (2018).

In February 2019, two of Rohan's short films, Tea Stall and Kintu, Jodi Emon Hoto, were released, followed by the web series Gone Case. The same year in September, the actor starred in Arun Chowdhury's Mayaboti opposite Nusrat Imrose Tisha. The film was well received by audience.

Rohan has described his character Ratul in Networker Baire (2021) as his most favourite one. The film starred an ensemble cast, including Sariful Razz, Nazia Haque Orsha and Tasnia Farin. Reviewing for The Business Standard, Siffat Bin Ayub named Rohan as the best performer in the film alongside Khairul Bashar. Rohan gained further popularity with a starring role opposite Bidya Sinha Saha Mim in Raihan Rafi's Poran (2022), a major box-office success. He refers to it as milestone in his career. A reviewer for The Daily Star, however, stated that Rohan got overshadowed by Sariful Razz in the film.

In 2024, Rohan starred in two popular dramas based on the anti-discrimination students movement: Obujh Pakhi and Forget Me Not. The former, which saw him playing a student and political activist, became a major success garnering 1.1 million views in a single day on YouTube.

== In the media ==
Rohan is one of the most popular young actors in Bangladeshi cinema. In 2025, he was among the most searched personalities in Bangladesh on Tiktok, besides Hania Aamir and Tangia Zaman Methila.

He has played a variety of roles in multiple genres, but is best known for romantic characters. Noting his boy next door screen persona, Antara Raisa of The Daily Star commented that he "has captivated the audience with his charming personality and sweet smile."

His parents being established actors, Rohan has faced criticism in media for being a beneficiary of nepotism. The actor argues that while his parents' reputation did provide him a break in films, he "survives in the industry on [his] own merit".

== Works ==
=== Television ===
- Agontuk
- Amader Somajbiggan
- Beder Meye
- Bhoot Hoite Sabdhan
- Bibaho Bivrat
- Chaka
- Dream And Love
- Facebook Chharar Chhoyti Upay
- prem je Eshechilo ekbar
- Kangkhito Prohor
- Kham Vorti Mon
- Miss Shiuli
- Porir Sathe Biye
- Roder Vitor Raat
- Rong Berong
- Sajano Bonobas
- Sukh
- Opolobdhi (2019)
- Untold Love Story
- Mimmi (2022)

=== Filmography ===
Key
†	Denotes films that have not yet been released

Year	Film	Role	Director	Note
2018	Swapnajaal	Apu	Giasuddin Selim	Debut film
2019	Mayaboti	Iqbal	Arun Chowdhury	
2019	Iti, Tomari Dhaka	Himself	Various	Guest appearance
2020	Shohor Chere Poranpur	Roman	Mizanur Rahman Aryan	Webfilm on Live Tech
2021	Kemne Ki	Onto	Iftekhar Ahmed Fahmi	Bongo BOB Telefilm; Based on the novel of Hakulla by Jobayed Ahsan
2021	Networker Baire	Ahsan Ahmed Ratul	Mizanur Rahman Aryan	
2022	Poran	Sifat	Raihan Rafi	
2022	Shesh Chithi	Shamol	Suman Dhar	A Chorki Webfilm
2023	Adam	Adam	Abu Tawhid Heron	
2023	Kuhelika	Arif	Samiur Rahman	Webfilm on Binge
2023	Phera	Yash	Sumon Dhar	Webfilm on Rtv
2023	Obak Kando		Mehedi Rony	Webfilm on Rtv
2023	Shoroter Joba †	TBA	Kusum Sikder	Post -production

=== Web series ===
Year	Title	Character	OTT	Director	Notes
2019	Eken Babu		Hoichoi	Abhijit Chowdhury	
2019	Gone Case		Bioscope	Anam Biswas	
2020	Paanch Phoron 2		Hoichoi	Nurul Alam Atique	
2021	Bou Diaries		Bioscope	Sameer Ahmed	
2022	Sabrina	Obhi	Hoichoi	Ashfaque Nipun	
2023	Buker Moddhye Agun	Arman Rahman Joy	Hoichoi	Taneem Rahman Angshu	
2023	Procholito	Rahat	Chorki	MD Abid Mallick	
2024	Obujh Pakhi		YouTube		
2024	Forget Me Not		Chorki		
2026	Headline	Journalist Samiul Alam	Hoichoi		
2026	ANNiE			Abdullah Mohammad Saad	

=== Short film ===
Year	Film	Notes
2015	Doob	As director
2016	The Red Note	As director
2019	Tea Stall	
2019	Kintu, Jodi Emon Hoto	
2020	Jodi Jante	
2020	Coronakal	
2020	Home	
