= Atiya Anisha =

Bangladeshi singer

- আতিয়া আনিসা
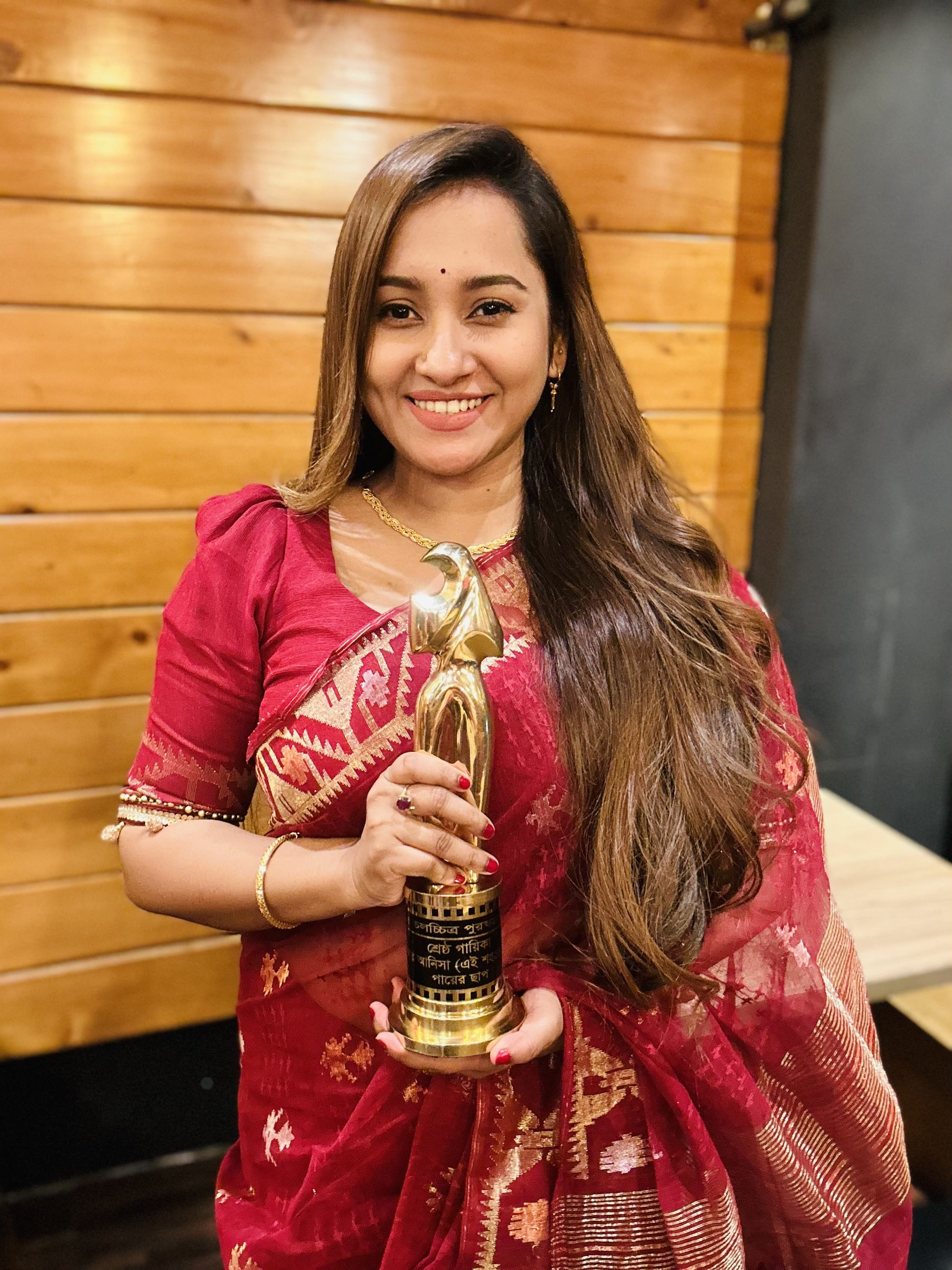
- Anisha with National Film Award
- Born: Atiya Akter Anisha; 2 April 1999 (age 27); Comilla, Bangladesh
- Occupation: Singer
- Musical career
- Years active: 2017–present

Atiya Akter Anisha (born 2 April 1999) is a Bangladeshi playback singer. She won the Bangladesh National Film Award for Best Female Playback Singer for her song Ei Shohorer Pothe Pothe from the film Payer Chhaap (2022).

== Career ==
Anisha's journey as a singer began when she participated as a finalist in the reality show "Shera Kontho 2017". She participated in "Zee Bangla Sa Re Ga Ma Pa," a famous reality show among Bengali-speaking audiences. One of her performances on the show, was a rendition of the song "Behaya Mon," originally composed by Chishti Baul and the song became very popular with the audience. Anisha started her playback singing career in 2019. She received the Meril Prothom Alo Award (2022) and the Ananda Lahari Award for her performance of the song 'Cholo Niralay' in the film 'Poran,' recognizing her as the best Female Playback Singer.

== Film soundtracks ==
Year	Film	Song	Lyricist	Co-singer(s)	Ref(s)
2019	Jodi Ekdin	"Jodi Ekdin"	Robiul Islam Jibon	Imran Mahmudul	
2019	Jodi Ekdin	"Chup Kotha"	Jounik Hoque	Imran Mahmudul	
2020	Shahenshah	"Tui Ami Chol"	Snehasish Ghosh	Imran Mahmudul	
2022	Paap Punno	"Tor Sathe Namlam Re Pothe"	Ishtiaq Ahmed	Emon Chowdhury	
2022	Poran	"Cholo Niralay'	Jony Hoque	Ayon Chaklader	
2022	Din–The Day	"Toke Rakhbo Khub Adore"	Snehasish Ghosh	Imran Mahmudul	
2023	Shatru	"Priya Re Priya"	Zahara Mitu & Hridoy	Shawon Gaanwala	

== Awards and nominations ==
Year	Award	Film	Category	Result	Reference(s)
2022	Bangladesh National Film Award	Payer Chaap	Best Female Playback Singer	Won	
2022	Babisas Award	Poran	Most Popular Singer Female	Won	
2022	Meril-Prothom Alo Awards	Poran	Best Female Playback Singer	Won	
2022	Channel i Music Awards	Pap Punno	Best Female Playback Singer	Won	
