= Poran (film) =

2022 Bangladeshi film

- Poster
- Directed by: Raihan Rafi
- Screenplay by: Shahjahan Sourav; Raihan Rafi
- Produced by: Live Technologies
- Starring: Bidya Sinha Saha Mim; Sariful Razz; Yash Rohan
- Cinematography: Michil Saha
- Music by: Naved Parvez; Jahid Nirob
- Distributed by: The Abhi Kathachitra
- Release date: 10 July 2022
- Running time: 139 minutes
- Country: Bangladesh
- Language: Bengali
- Budget: ৳8.3 million (US$68,000)
- Box office: est. ৳120 million (equivalent to ৳150 million or US$1.2 million in 2024)

Poran is a 2022 Bangladeshi romantic thriller film directed by Raihan Rafi and produced by Md Tamzid Ul Alam under his production banner Live Technologies. Inspired by true events, the film features Bidya Sinha Saha Mim, Sariful Razz, and Yash Rohan in lead roles.

The film was released on 10 July 2022, coinciding with Eid al-Adha. It received positive reviews from critics and audience. Grossing over ৳12 crore, it became second highest grossing Bangladeshi film of 2022 as well as one of the highest grossing Bangladeshi film of all time

== Plot ==
Ananya's family finds that she has tried to commit suicide by ingesting poison. She is rushed to the hospital by her mother, father, and little sister. News reports show that Ananya is suspected in the murder of her husband Sifat by her lover Roman. A police officer comes to the hospital to interrogate her about the murder. He thinks the suicide attempt is a ruse to avoid interrogation, but he listens to her father and gives her time to recover.

Three weeks later, Ananya comes to the police station and tells the officer her side of the story. Ananya was a bad student who failed her SSC three times and was on her way to failing her HSC exam for the third time. Her father threatens to kick her out of the house if she fails again. She takes her pretest and gets caught cheating.

Meanwhile, Roman is a local gangster who works for politician Daisy Sarkar. He runs the local yaba trade and is a drug addict. He is obsessed with Ananya and stalks her. One day, he approaches her on the street, scaring her. She finally decides to tell her family, but her father thinks it is a ruse to justify failing her exams, but nonetheless he decides to go to the police and then Daisy Sarkar. This works for a little bit, but Roman again approaches Ananya.

Ananya tells him she is afraid she is going to fail her exams again if he continues to disturb her, so he decides to help her. He threatens a fellow student to allow her to cheat off of him and he threatens her teacher, who changes her grade. Ananya appreciates the assistance and starts spending time with Roman. She even tells him that he is her Poran (soul). With his help she passes her HSC exam. He even gives her a smart phone, which she had wanted earlier. She loves the attention, but she insists that he was only a good friend for her.

When Ananya goes to university, she meets Sifat. He is the smartest student in his class and tutors other students. Ananya is smitten by him and constantly tries to get his attention, which he avoids. She asks him to tutor her one-on-one, but he refuses. She finally goes to Roman, who threatens Sifat into providing personal tutoring to Ananya. She uses this time to flirt with Sifat.

Eventually the two fall in love and begin dating. Sifat gets bold and tells Roman to stop bothering Ananya and that he loves her. Roman beats Sifat, which disturbs Ananya. She tells Roman that they can only be together if he gives up politics and drugs, two things that she thinks he can't live without. But Roman manages to give both up, at great expense.

When he gives up politics, Daisy Sarkar, angry, has the police file charges for all crimes he committed while working for her including murder and drug trading. He is on the run and asks Ananya to come to Dhaka with him. Instead of running away with him, she turns him in to the police. She then tells Sifat that he must marry her within 7 days and take her out of the country within 3 months, to which Sifat agrees.

Married life becomes bland to Ananya as her husband is constantly studying so that he can manage to take her out of the country, as he had promised. One day, they go out and a goon touches her back. She reacts aggressively and is upset that her husband did not defend her. This reminds her of Roman who once broke a man's arms and legs for teasing her. She goes to see him in jail and apologizes to him. He begs her not to leave him, but she still leaves.

One day, Ananya and Sifat are going to her parents house, when they stop by an ice cream stall. Roman, who has escaped from jail, tries to force Ananya to go with him. When Sifat gets in the way, he takes a sickle knife from near by and attacks him. Ananya rushed him to the hospital but he dies. The video of the murder goes viral and there is pressure from all over the country to get justice for Sifat. Roman had again gone in hiding.

The inspector seems to believe her story and almost lets her go. Then he finishes the rest of the story. Roman is drawn out of hiding by his friend, but then murders him. The friend tells the officer that he murdered his best friend at the command of Ananya, who blames Roman for ruining her life. Ananya is arrested, as the bodies of Sifat and Roman lie side by side in the morgue.

== Cast ==
- Bidya Sinha Saha Mim as Ananya
- Sariful Razz as Roman
- Yash Rohan as Sifat
- Shilpi Sarkar Apu as mother of Ananya
- Shahiduzzaman Selim as father of Ananya
- Rosy Siddiqui as Daisy Sarkar
- Lutfur Rahman George
- Rashed Mamun Apu as Tota Miya
- Mili Bashar
- Nasir Uddin Khan as Shopon, a police inspector
- Ashutosh Poddar as editor

== Production ==
The shooting of the film started on September 3, 2019. It was shot in Mymensingh. The shooting ended after 18 days. On July 9, 2022, the director of the film announced on Facebook Live that the character named Ananya was taken from his ex-girlfriend. After watching the teaser of the film on YouTube, the viewers have assumed that the film is based on the Murder of Rifat Sharif. Although the director admitted that the film was based on true events, he said that the film was not based on his murder. Its post production work is done in India.

== Music ==
Poran

Soundtrack album by Emon Chowdhury, Ayon Chaklader, Atiya Anisha, AP Shuvo, Jinia Jafrin Luipa, Arafatul Hasan Shanto
- Released: 2022
- Recorded: 2019
- Genre: Film music
- Length: 13:56
- Language: Bengali
- Producers: Naved Parvez; Jahid Nirob

Naved Parvez was the composer and director of two songs of the film. Among these two songs, the song "Cholo Niralai" was composed by him in 2019. When Rafhan Rafi asked him for a song for a film, he chose this song. His second song "Jolere Poran" is the title track of the film. The composer and director of the remaining two songs except "Dheere Dheere" is Jahid Nirob.

Poran Soundtrack – Track listing
No.	Title	Lyrics	Singers	Length
1.	"Cholo Niralai"	Johny Haque	Ayon Chaklader and Atiya Anisha	3:25
2.	"Jolere Poran"	Tahsan Shuvo and Wasique Saikat	AP Shuvo	3:40
3.	"Dheere Dheere"	Robiul Islam Jibon	Emon Chowdhury and Zinia Zafrin Luipa	4:15
4.	"Biyer Gaan"	Rasel Mahmud	Ayesha Mousumi
5.	"Sajiye Guchiye De More"	Baul Kamal Pasha	Arafatul Hasan Shanto	2:36

== Controversy ==
Two days prior to the release, it was reported that the family members accused in the Rifat Sharif murder case were angry about the film. They have expressed anger over various issues including presenting the incident differently, not taking permission from the family, making the film before the legal proceedings are over. They have also threatened to take separate legal action against the film.

== Release ==
=== Theatrical ===
The film was supposed to be released in 2019. Then its release date was fixed in July 2020. After that, the film was supposed to be released on February 14, 2021, but it became uncertain. Due to censorship problems and the COVID-19 epidemic, the release of the film became uncertain. On July 4, 2022, it was reported that the censor board had decided to allow the release of the film. The film was released in 11 cinemas on July 10, 2022. The film started showing in 8 more cinemas on the third day of its release. Within 5 days of the release, the number of screenings of the film Poran was increased including Star Cineplex, Blockbuster Cinemas and Lion Cinemas. After that the film started showing in three more cinemas. It was decided to screen the film in a total of 55 cinemas with 41 more from 22 July. In August, it was reported that the film was showing in 60 cinemas in the country. In late October, Poran was screened in Nandan, Kolkata on the occasion of the 4th Bangladesh film festival. It was shown for 100 days in Bangladeshi movie theaters. 100 days after its release, Poran was shown in 11 cinemas in the country. On 3 February 2023, it was released in Canada.

== Reception ==
=== Critical response ===
The film has been a huge critical and commercial success. Ahsan Kabir, columnist of Bdnews24.com praised the performances of the film's actors and actresses. Audiences on social media have given positive reactions to the film as well as praising actor Raj and actress Mim. Khan Tajneen Ahsan of Somoy TV said that although the story of the film is known, it will not let anyone leave the cinema until it ends. She praised the performance of Sariful Razz who played the role of Roman in the film Poran saying that he has been able to portray the character perfectly. She appreciated its background music. According to her, the music of the film had an impact on the audience. She feels that the story of the film is devoid of unrealistic which is a positive aspect of it. She criticized the make-up, dubbing and color grading of the film. She thinks that the climax scene could have been longer. Rahman Moti of Bangla Movie Database called Poran "a standard commercial film made with a mix of other elements" and rated the film 8 out of 10. Monira Sharmin, a professor of mass communication and journalism at Green University of Bangladesh and a film analyst, feels that the film portrays misogyny unnecessarily.

=== Box office ===
In August 2022, the producer of the film stated that he could produce more five films (worth of ৳4.15 crore) with the same budget of Poran from the earning of the film. On 19 October 2022, The Daily Star reported the quote of Jahid Hasa Abhi from its distributor. Abhi stated to the newspaper that the multiplexes in Bangladesh sold tickets of the film worth ৳10 crore. According to a report by Prothom Alo, its distributor told them that according to their information, the film has sold tickets worth around ৳12 crore and its net income is around ৳3 crore.
