= Procholito =

2023 Bangladeshi horror anthology streaming television series

- Series poster
- Bengali: প্রচলিত
- Genre: Anthology; Horror; Drama
- Written by: Md. Abid Mallick
- Story by: Md. Abid Mallick
- Directed by: Md. Abid Mallick
- Starring: See below
- Composer: Khayam Sanu Sandhi
- Country of origin: Bangladesh
- Original language: Bengali
- No. of seasons: 1
- No. of episodes: 5

Production
- Executive producer: Assaduzzaman Sokal
- Producer: Redoan Rony
- Cinematography: Raju Raj
- Editor: Shobuj Sheikh
- Running time: 23–28 minutes
- Production company: Digital Shadow

Original release
- Network: Chorki
- Release: 19 October – 16 November 2023

Procholito (Bengali: প্রচলিত) is a 2023 Bangladeshi horror anthology streaming television series directed by Md. Abid Mallick. The series consists of 5 episodes. The first episode, Ringtone, premiered on 19 October 2023, and the last episode of the series, Haatbodol, premiered on 16 November 2023 on Chorki. This is the 4th anthology series released on the platform. Redoan Rony is the producer, Md. Assaduzzaman is the executive producer, and Shantonu Shaan serves as the chief assistant director of this series.

== Cast ==
- Rafiul Qader Rubel
- Mahmud Alam
- Tanay Biswas
- Abdullah Al Sentu
- Farin Khan
- Yash Rohan
- Rafayatullah Sohan
- Sadia Ayman as Anna
- Baizid Haque Joarder
- Sahana Rahman Sumi
- Khalid Hasan Rumi
- Ashraful Ashish
- Mostafa Monwar
- Ashok Bepari
- Pankaj Majumdar

== Episodes ==
No.	Title	Original release date
1	"Ringtone"	19 October 2023
Maznu, a snatcher, stabs a man named Mr. Akram and flees, stealing his bag labelled 'From Father to Mitu.'
2	"Bilai"	26 October 2023
During the COVID-19 pandemic, a man named Uttam and his cat try to survive the lockdown.
3	"Bewarish"	2 November 2023
On a dark night, two people carry a corpse, going through a deserted village street surrounded by bamboo bushes.
4	"Callingbell"	9 November 2023
Anna and Richard, a newly married couple, move into a rented flat, where the doorbell rings every day at the same time despite no one being at the door.
5	"Haatbodol"	16 November 2023
Rahat, an architecture student, discovers a Facebook post to adopt a dog identical to his deceased dog, Mark.

== Production ==
The series was shot in July and August 2023 in different locations of Dhaka, Manikganj and Savar. Color grading was done by Ashraful Alom and sound design by Ripon Nath. It was produced by the production company Digital Shadow.

== Release ==
Chorki released the trailer of Procholito on YouTube on 13 October 2023. The series premiered on 19 October 2023, with weekly releases on Thursdays. The last episode aired on 16 November 2023.

== See also ==
- Unoloukik
- Jaago Bahey
- Pett Kata Shaw
