= Chorki (search engine) =

Defunct Bangladeshi search engine

- Website type: Web Search Engine
- Available in: 2 languages
- List of languages: Bengali; English
- Owner: Chorki Limited
- Revenue: Advertising
- Website: ~~chorki.com~~
- Commercial: Yes
- Registration: Optional
- Launched: March 1, 2015
- Current status: Inactive

Chorki was a search engine for finding information on the internet in both Bengali and English. Although Chorki was initiated by the local company Chorki Limited, it was sponsored by the Malaysia-based VC Mind Initiative company. It placed significant importance on e-commerce. Its primary goal was to display Bangladesh-centric results. Chorki is currently shut down.

== History ==
The idea of Chorki began in 2014, and in 2015, work started by renting an office. Although the first business investment came from Mind Initiative, some funding had already been provided by others before that.

At the time of its launch on April 20, it could display over 500,000 products from 800 e-commerce sites and over 400,000 articles from more than 30 news websites. Its main categories included Web, Products, News, Food, Jobs, and Cricket. Its information sources were Wikipedia, leading Bengali and English news websites in the country, Bengali blogs, the National E-Information Repository, and other sources. By its seventh month, approximately 23 employees were working for Chorki. Chorki also launched an e-commerce platform named Ghuri. Chorki was shut down in the latter part of 2016.

== See also ==
- Chorki, a OTT platform
