= Khairul Basar =

Bangladeshi actor

- খায়রুল বাশার
- Born: 11 May 1990 (age 36); Mymensingh, Bangladesh
- Education: Dhaka University
- Occupation: Actor
- Years active: 2017–present
- Awards: Meril-Prothom Alo Awards for Best Actor

Khairul Basar (Bengali: খায়রুল বাশার; [kʰae̯ɾul baʃaɾ]) is a Bangladeshi actor. He works primarily in Dhallywood cinema and television dramas. He made his debut in the entertainment industry with the short film Punorabritti (2017), directed by Saleh Sobhan Anim. He won the Meril-Prothom Alo Award for Best TV Actor for his performances in the television drama Rod Brishtir Golpo (2024).

== Early life ==
Basar was born in Mymensingh and he studied at the University of Dhaka.

== Career ==
Basar learned how to mime from Mir Lokman and joined Dhaka University Mime Action. He performed in nearly 400 mime shows between 2011 and 2017. After miming, he started acting with the short film Punorabritti (2017).

In 2019, Basar made his cinematic debut with Bangladesh's first anthology film, Iti, Tomari Dhaka. He was also seen in the film Campus Climax (2020), which was directed by Dhaka University student Jeet Dey. In 2020, he performed the main role in the television drama Tomar Pashe Hatte Diyo. He also appeared in the feature film Unoponchash Batash, released in 2020.

Basar appeared in the telefilms Chumki Cholechhe and Charer Master (2021). He also appeared in the 2021 Chorki web film Networker Baire, directed by Mizanur Rahman Aryan. He then starred in the 2021 web series Mohanagar. Ariful Hasan Shuvo, writing for The Business Standard, praised everyone's performances, whereas OTTplay criticized Basar's facial expressions. A critic wrote that "Khairul Basar made his way into the showbiz industry with tele-fictions and TVCs. He soon rose to fame with his natural and effortless acting skills. With two back to back OTT hits, Mohanagar and Networker Baire, the actor soon became the talk of the town, and was appreciated by one and all".

Basar was nominated for the Chorki Award for Best Supporting Actor in Nikhoj (2022). The same year, he starred in the web series Teerondaj. Regarding his performance, a critic wrote that "the actor garnered praises for productions like Teerondaj and Nikhoj". He was nominated for Best Television Actor in the 2022 Meril-Prothom Alo Awards for the television drama Galiber Prem O Boshonter Kabbo (2022). He won the Bangladesh Excellence Award for Best Actor for the television drama Shohore Onek Rod (2023). At the end of 2023, a critic from Bangladesh Post wrote that "Khairul Basar, on the other hand, has earned acclaim as a versatile actor, impressing both audiences and producers alike. Over time, he has become a preferred choice for many filmmakers". He also won the Global Star Awards 2024 for Best Actor for the television drama Shasti (2024). He also appeared in the 2024 film Kajolrekha, which was released on Eid 2024.

In 2025, Basar won the Television Reporters Unity of Bangladesh (TRUB) Award for Best TV Actor for his performance in the 2024 television drama Afsos.

== Filmography ==
=== Feature films ===
Key
| † | Denotes films that have not yet been released |

| Year | Works | Role | Notes | Ref. |
|---|---|---|---|---|
| 2018 | Iti, Tomari Dhaka | Jui's Lover | Debut film; anthology film segment of 'Where, Nowhere' | |
| 2020 | Unoponchash Batash | Neeraa's Friend | | |
| 2024 | Kajolrekha | Rajkumar Sonadhor | | |
| 2026 | Bonolota Sen | Jibanananda Das | Based on Jibanananda Das's poem 'Banalata Sen' | |
| 2026 | Thikana Bangladesh † | TBA | Completed | |

=== Web films ===
| Year | Works | Role | Notes | Ref. |
|---|---|---|---|---|
| 2020 | Campus Climax | Abir Ahmed | Web film on YouTube | |
| 2021 | Charer Master | Master | Web film on Bongo | |
| 2021 | The Dark Side of Dhaka | Opu | Web film on iTheatre | |
| 2021 | Networker Baire | Munna | Web film on Chorki | |
| 2021 | Punorjonmo 2 | Niloy / Monju | Web film on Channel i | |
| 2022 | Teerondaj | Saif | Web film on Bioscope | |
| 2022 | Sahosh | Police | Web film on Chorki | |
| 2022 | Shuklopokkho | Monju | Web film on Chorki | |
| 2022 | Punorjonmo 3 | Niloy / Monju | Web film on Channel i | |
| 2022 | Zero Point | Rasel | Web film on RTV | |
| 2022 | Cafe Desire | Fuad | Web film on Chorki | |
| 2023 | Punorjonmo Antim Porbo | Niloy / Monju | Web film on Channel i | |
| 2023 | Murder 90s | Mukit | Web film on RTV | |
| 2026 | Dear Family | | Released on Channel i | |
| 2026 | Tumito Cholei Jabe | | Released on YouTube | |

=== Series ===
| Year | Works | Role | Notes | Ref. |
|---|---|---|---|---|
| 2021 | Mohanagar | Abir Hasan | Series on Hoichoi | |
| 2021 | Bilaap | Nannu | Series on Cinematic | |
| 2021–2022 | Friendbook | Nirab | TV serial on NTV | |
| 2022 | Nikhoj | Mamun Alam | Series on Chorki | |
| 2022 | Ashare Golpo: Tabiz | Rakib | Series on Bioscope | |
| 2022 | Bodh | Bahauddin Sumon | Series on Hoichoi | |
| 2023 | Kabadi | Sunny | Series on Bioscope | |
| 2025–2026 | Eta Amaderi Golpo | Samir | TV serial on Channel i | |
| 2026 | Fire Ashar Golpo | Adil | TV serial on Channel i | |

=== Short films ===
| Year | Works | Role | Notes | Ref |
|---|---|---|---|---|
| 2017 | Punorabritti | Proshanto | Short film on YouTube | |
| 2017 | Makorsha | Basar | Short film on YouTube | |
| 2021 | Ek Din Brishtite Bikele | Rony | Released on Bongo BD | |
| 2024 | Bagher Bachcha | Shuvo | Short film on Chorki | |
| 2024 | Gaiyan | Mamun | Short film on Bongo BD; part of Love Stories | |

== Television ==
- Galiber Prem O Boshonter Kabbo (2022)
- Gulail (2023)
- Toke Khuje Berai (2024)
- Bari Theke Paliye (2024)
- Durdesh (2024)
- Mumta (2024)
- Ami Ekhanei Thakbo (2024)
- Chokh Je Mayer Kotha Bole (2024)
- Khunshuti (2024)
- Premik (2025)
- Prakritojon (2025)
- Boshonto Bouri (2025)
- Smart Lodging Master (2026)

== Awards and nominations ==
| Year | Award | Category | Work | Result | Ref. |
|---|---|---|---|---|---|
| 2022 | Bangladesh Cultural Reporters Association | Best Actor | Galiber Prem O Boshonter Kabbo | Won | |
| 2022 | Chorki Awards | Best Supporting Actor | Nikhoj | Nominated | |
| 2022 | Meril-Prothom Alo Awards | Best Actor | Galiber Prem O Boshonter Kabbo | Nominated | |
| 2023 | Bangladesh Excellence Awards | Best Actor | Shohore Onek Rod | Won | |
| 2024 | Global Star Awards | Best Actor | Shasti | Won | |
| 2024 | Meril-Prothom Alo Awards | Best Actor | Poroshpor | Nominated | |
| 2024 | Meril-Prothom Alo Awards | Best Actor | Rod Brishtir Golpo | Won | |
| 2025 | Television Reporters Unity of Bangladesh 'TRUB' Awards | Best TV Actor | Afsos | Won | |
| 2026 | Meril-Prothom Alo Awards | Best Actor in TV Series | Eta Amaderi Golpo | Nominated | |
| 2026 | BIFA Awards | Best Actor in TV Series | Eta Amaderi Golpo | Won | |
