= Mayashalik =

2022 Bangladeshi film

- Official release poster
- মায়াশালিক
- Directed by: Shihab Shaheen
- Screenplay by: Jahan Sultana
- Produced by: Ahmed Arman Siddiqui Rizwana Rashid Ani Hasibul Hasan
- Starring: Ziaul Faruq Apurba Sadia Ayman Shahiduzzaman Selim
- Cinematography: Kamrul Islam Shubho
- Edited by: Rashaduzzaman Shohag Leon Rozario
- Production company: Red Pad Studio
- Distributed by: Binge
- Release date: 19 December 2022
- Running time: 1 hour 53 minutes
- Country: Bangladesh
- Language: Bengali

Mayashalik (Bengali: মায়াশালিক, transl. Magical) is a 2022 Bangladeshi sci-fi romantic web film directed by Shihab Shaheen. The film stars Ziaul Faruq Apurbo, Sadia Ayman in lead roles and Shahiduzzaman Selim, Imtiaz Barshon in supporting roles.

== Plot ==
The story of "Mayashalik" revolves around a young, retired military officer, who had to leave the army due to physical injuries. To get rid of his depression, he moves away from the chaotic city life, to a place where there is no mobile network. That's when some mysterious activities begin to take place around him, and he eventually falls in love with a mysterious girl. He then gets a phone call from an unknown girl and they talk a lot. Finally when they decide to meet something unusual happens. They both arrive at the same place but they do not see each other. Then they realize they are in a different timeline. Two timelines got connected by a land phone.

== Cast ==
- Ziaul Faruq Apurbo as Ovi
- Sadia Ayman as Sara
- Imtiaz Barshon as Sci-fi writer (Cameo appearance)
- Shahiduzzaman Selim as Sara's father

== Release ==
The film has been released digitally on Binge on 19 December 2022.

== Award ==
Award	Category	Nominee	Result	Ref
BCRA Award 2022	Best actress (critics)	Sadia Ayman	Nominated	
