= Not a Fiction =

Bangladeshi short film

Not a Fiction is a Bangladeshi short film produced, directed, and shot by Shah Newaz Khan Cju. The film is presented in a one-shot format and addresses the issue of extrajudicial killings.

== Plot ==
The film highlights the issue of an extrajudicial killing case. It reflects a grim reality that persists across the globe.

== Cast ==
The cast includes:

- Udoyon Rajib
- Naymul Alam Mishu
- Rudroneel Ahmed
- Oishik Sami Ahmed
- Zawad Soudho
- Mithun

== Production ==
The film was co-produced by Sadia Khalid Reeti, a film critic and FIPRESCI jury member at the Cannes Film Festival & executive produced by MD Asif. The sound design was handled by Ripon Nath and Rony Sazzad, with Rashaduzzaman Shohag in charge of color grading. The editing team comprised Leon Rozario and Tanvir Ahmed Rony, assisted by Al Amin Sumon and MD Aman Khan.

== Release and screenings ==
Not a Fiction was selected for several film festivals, including:

- Hamilton Film Festival (Canada, 2023)
- Silver Wave Film Festival (Canada, 2023)
- 33rd Cinequest Film & VR Festival (California, 2024)
- 19th Tasveer Film Festival & Market (Seattle, Washington, 2024)
- 18th Beirut Shorts International Film Festival (Lebanon, 2024)
- Prague Film Festival (Czech Republic, 2025)

It was also screened at:

- Vienna International Film Awards (2024)
- 3rd AIU Kuwait International Film Festival (2024)
- Erie International Film Festival (USA, 2024)
- International Usak Short Film Festival (2024)
- Golden Bridge International Short Film Festival (Turkey, 2024)
- Serbest International Film Festival (Moldova, 2024)

The film was featured on the international OTT platform MUBI.
