= Networker Baire =

2021 film directed by Mizanur Rahman Aryan

- Promotional poster
- Bengali: নেটওয়ার্কের বাইরে
- Literally: Out of network
- Directed by: Mizanur Rahman Aryan
- Written by: Jobaed Ahsan; Mizanur Rahman Aryan
- Produced by: Redoan Rony
- Starring: Tasnia Farin; Sariful Razz; Tasnuva Tisha; Yash Rohan; Nazia Haque Orsha; Khairul Basar; Junayed Bukdadi; Nazifa Tushi; Md Lemon Mridha
- Cinematography: Raju Raj
- Edited by: Simit Ray Antor
- Music by: Sajid Sarkar; Md Lemon Mridha
- Production companies: Frame Per Second; Mr. Aryan Films
- Distributed by: Chorki
- Release date: 19 August 2021
- Running time: 90 minutes
- Country: Bangladesh
- Language: Bengali

Networker Baire (Bengali: নেটওয়ার্কের বাইরে) is a Bangladeshi romantic comedy web film directed by Mizanur Rahman Aryan. Aryan and Jobaed Ahsan wrote the screenplay. The story is inspired by true events. The film stars Sariful Razz, Yash Rohan, Nazia Haque Orsha, Tasnuva Tisha, Khairul Basar, Junayed Bukdadi, Tasnia Farin, Nazifa Tushi, and Md Lemon Mridha.

Networker Baire is the first film of the television director Aryan. Initially, he wanted to make it for theatres. But due to the ongoing COVID-19 pandemic, releasing films in theatres had become difficult. In this circumstance, Chorki came forward and financed this project.

Redoan Rony serves as the producer of the film under the banner of Frame Per Second in association with Mr. Aryan Films. Networker Baire was released on Chorki on 19 August 2021.

Networker Baire received critical acclaim, with praise for its story, cinematography, acting, and music.

== Plot ==
Four Friends; Munna, Abir, Sifat, and Ratul. This is the story of their bond, friendship, and the ups and downs of life. They plan a tour to get out of this chaotic city, have a blast, explore, and go beyond the network. This is their first tour together, they plan to continue this tradition forever, but an unexpected event happens that changes their lives. Those four friends were engaging in fun, banters, and madness in the heart of Cox's Bazar when something unexpected happens to them.

== Cast ==
- Sariful Razz as Abir Chowdhury
- Khairul Basar as Munna
- Nazia Haque Orsha as Tania
- Yash Rohan as Ahsan Ahmed Ratul
- Tasnia Farin as Kotha
- Junayed Bukdadi as Sifat Jamil
- Nazifa Tushi as Samiya
- Tasnuva Tisha as Faiza
- Manosh Sengupta
- Md Lemon Mridha as Lemon
- Monira Yousuf Memy
- Mahmud Sazzad

== Production ==
On 8 April 2021, Chorki released a mashup video revealing their launching date and their upcoming most awaited projects. In that video, there were some scenes of Networker Baire but that time name wasn't announced.

On 30 April 2021, they finally announced the film Networker Baire and introduced the cast and crew of the film in a press release.

Filming began in November 2020 in Dhaka. Indoor shooting completed here. And the principal outdoor photography took place on beaches of Cox's Bazar and St. Martin's Island in December 2020 to January 2021 for a span of 17 days. There were some underwater shoots in the sea which required expertise.

== Release ==
The film was released digitally on Chorki on 19 August 2021.

== Reception ==
Networker Baire was praised by both critics and the audience. Suborna Mustafa wrote, "Mizanur Rahman Aryan's storytelling style is totally different. Networker Baire is just another signature of his talent". Reviewing for The Business Standard, Siffat Bin Ayub gave the film a "7.2 out of 10" score and said, "The film delivered on exactly what we wanted – some beautiful scenery, good acting, and a simple yet wonderful story about friendship."

== Music ==
The first song of the film was released on Chorki's YouTube channel on Friendship Day 2021.

| No. | Title | Lyrics | Music | Singers | Length |
|---|---|---|---|---|---|
| 1. | "Chol Bondhu Chol" | Shomeshwar Oli, Md. Lemon Mridha | Sajid Sarkar | Ibrahim Kamrul Shafin, Md. Lemon Mridha | 4:34 |
| 2. | "Rupkothar Jogote" | Shomeshwar Oli | Sajid Sarkar | Abanti Sithi & Rehaan Rasul | 5:12 |
| 3. | "Pother Gaan" | Khayam Sanu Sandhi | Khayam Sanu Sandhi | Khayam Sanu Sandhi | 1:52 |
