= Emon Chowdhury =

Bangladeshi composer

- ইমন চৌধুরী
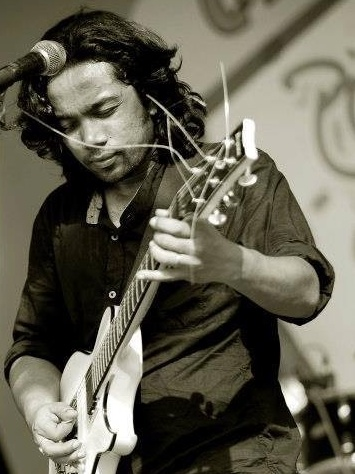
- Chowdhury in 2014
- Born: Mustafizur Rahman Chowdhury Emon; 19 July 1990 (age 36)
- Occupations: Musician, guitarist
- Known for: Guitarist of Chirkutt
- Awards: Bangladesh National Film Award

Mustafizur Rahman Chowdhury Emon (born 19 July 1990), known as Emon Chowdhury, is a Bangladeshi musician best known as working outside of the rock band Chirkutt. He won Bangladesh National Film Award for Best Music Director for his work in the film Maya: The Lost Mother.

== Background ==
Emon Chowdhury's father Matiur Rahman Chowdhury was the principal of Nazrul Academy in Narshingdi.

== Filmography ==
=== As a music director ===
Year	Film	Director	Role
2021	No Ground Beneath the Feet	Mohammad Rabby Mridha	
2021	Raat Jaga Phool	Mir Sabbir	Composer
2022	Paap Punno	Giasuddin Selim	Singer with Atia Anisha
2022	Hawa	Mejbaur Rahman Sumon	
2023	Surongo	Raihan Rafi	song: "Dhukkur Pukkur"

== Awards ==
Year	Nominated work	Category	Award	Result	Notes	Ref.
2019	Maya: The Lost Mother	Best Music Director	Bangladesh National Film Awards	Won		
2023	Paap Punno	Film Soundtrack	Sunsilk Channel i Music Awards	Won		
2024	Megh Balika	Best Music Composer	Blender's Choice- The Daily Star OTT & Digital Content Awards	Won		
