= Bonolota Sen =

- Film poster
- Directed by: Masud Hasan Ujjal
- Screenplay by: Masud Hasan Ujjal
- Based on: Jibanananda Das's poem "Banalata Sen"
- Produced by: Masud Hasan Ujjal
- Starring: Masuma Rahman Nabila; Khairul Basar; Shohel Mondol; Maimuna Momo
- Cinematography: Ridoy Sarkar
- Edited by: Masud Hasan Ujjal
- Music by: Bappa Mazumder
- Production companies: Red October Films; Government of Bangladesh
- Distributed by: Red October Films
- Release date: 28 May 2026
- Running time: 142 minutes
- Country: Bangladesh
- Language: Bengali

Bonolota Sen is a 2026 Bangladeshi drama film. It is based on the poem of the same title by Jibanananda Das and directed by Masud Hasan Ujjal under the banner of Red October Films. Masuma Rahman Nabila plays the title role, while Khairul Basar and Shohel Mondal play other lead roles, including many others.

Ridoy Sarkar's cinematography is edited by Masud Hasan Ujjal and music is composed by Bappa Mazumder. The film is a grantee of the Ministry of Information and Broadcasting, Government of the People's Republic of Bangladesh, for the fiscal year 2021-22 and is being produced by Red October Films.

== Cast ==
- Masuma Rahman Nabila as Banalata Sen
- Khairul Basar as Jibanananda Das
- Shohel Mondal as Moheen
- Maimuna Momo as Lavanya Gupta
- Ruponti Akid as Shobhana
- Najiba Bashar as Leela Nag
- Sharif Siraj as Buddhadev Basu
- Gazi Rakait as Rabindranath Tagore
- Priyanti Urbi as Banalata Banerjee
- Sumaiya Parveen Khushi as Monia
- Hamidur Rahman
- Shahriar Ferdous Sajib

== Production ==
The film received a government grant for its production in the fiscal year 2021–22. According to director Masud Hasan Ujjwal, he worked on the film for about ten years, revised the script 12 times, and delved deeply into the world of Jibanananda.

== Distribution ==
The character posters for the film Banalata Sen were released two days after its official announcement. The unique posters were designed and illustrated by director Masud Hasan Ujjwal.

== Release ==
The film received a release permit from the Certification Board on 12 April 2026. It was released in theaters in Bangladesh on 28 May of the same year, on the occasion of Eid-ul-Adha.

== Reception ==
The film received mixed to positive response from audience and critics. Pritha Parmitha Nag wroted by Prothom Alo's survey "Khairul Basar also did well in the role of Jibanananda Das". Wroted by Bidhan Ribeiro in Bangla Tribune's survey "Ridoy Sarkar's cinematography has brought joy and peace to our eyes in some places". Wroted by Wahidur Rahman in Bonik Barta's survey "The production style, cinematography and music of the film are impressed the audience". Wroted by FI Deepu in Jugantor's survey "Cinematography, music and environment creation are very well but the story of the film are slowly running".

Wroted by Somoy TV's survey "The songs of the film are also receiving praise from music lovers". Wroted by Joy Shahriar in Bangla Stream's survey "The entire team deserves praise for their acting. Khairul Basar has done an outstanding job". Wroted by Ahsan Kabir in Alap's survey "Everyone has acted great in the film". Wroted by Jago News 24's survey "The visuals and acting of the films have been praised, but the stories have been found to be complex and incomprehensible to the general audience".
