= Kajolrekha =

2024 Bangladeshi film

- Film poster
- Directed by: Giasuddin Selim
- Screenplay by: Giasuddin Selim
- Based on: Maimansingha Gitika's Kajolrekha
- Produced by: Giasuddin Selim
- Starring: Sariful Razz; Mandira Chakraborty; Rafiath Rashid Mithila; Sadia Ayman; Azad Abul Kalam; Iresh Zaker; Khairul Basar
- Cinematography: Kamrul Hasan Khasru
- Music by: Emon Chowdhury
- Production company: Palki Production
- Distributed by: Jaaz Multimedia
- Release date: 11 April 2024
- Running time: 156 minutes
- Country: Bangladesh
- Language: Bengali
- Budget: ৳5 crore (US$410,000)

Kajalrekha is a 2024 Bangladeshi musical poetic drama film directed by Giasuddin Selim. It is based on Kajalrekha, a Bengali fairy tale of four hundred years ago from the compilation Maimansingha Gitika. Sariful Razz and Mandira Chakraborty are playing the lead roles. It is released in theaters on April 11, 2024.

== Cast ==
- Sariful Razz as Such Kumar
- Mandira Chakraborty as Kajalrekha
- Rafiath Rashid Mithila as Konkon Dashi
- Sadia Ayman as Young Kajolrekha
- Khairul Basar as Rajkumar Sonadhor
- Iresh Zaker
- Azad Abul Kalam
- Shahana Rahman Sumi
- Irfan Salim Sujan
- Jhuna Chowdhury
- Gausul Alam Shawon
- Tanvir Hossain Prabal
- Aranna Rahi Jol
- Pankaj Majumder

== Production ==
In 2022, the shooting of the film Kajalrekha started at Susong Durgapur in Netrakona.

Giasuddin Selim researched the Maimansingha Gitika's Kajalrekha for about 12 years and made the film.

=== Published ===
Kajalrekha team promoted the film during the World Cup match of the Bangladesh National Cricket Team at Eden Gardens of Kolkata on 28 October 2023.

The trailer was released on the film's official Facebook page on 27 March 2024.

== Release ==
The film was scheduled to be released on February 9, 2024, in Bangladesh, Canada, and America simultaneously, it was delayed and released in theaters in Bangladesh on April 11 on the occasion of Eid. In International Film Festival Rotterdam's Limelight 2025 section, this film selected to screened.

== Impression ==
Maimansingha Gitika is one of the sources of medieval Bengali culture. A part of that is Kajalrekha, which was made into a film directed by Giasuddin Selim. As an example of this source of history, the film Kajalrekha is included in the syllabus of the Master's class of the History Department of Dhaka University.
