= Abanti Sithi =

Bangladeshi Singer

Abanti Sithi অবন্তী সিঁথি
- Also known as: Whistle Queen, Whistle Girl
- Born: Abanti Deb Sithi; 23 November 1992 (age 33); Jamalpur, Bangladesh
- Genres: Classic; Pop; Cup Song
- Occupations: Musician; Teacher
- Years active: 2016–present
- Spouse: Amit Dey (m. 2023)

Abanti Deb Sithi (born 23 November 1992) is a Bangladeshi singer. She won the Meril-Prothom Alo Award for Best Female Singer for her song Rupkotha Jogote in the web film Networker Baire (2021).

She is known for creating unique musical rhythms using plastic cups, foil paper, and metal coins. Additionally, she is highly skilled at whistling in sync with the Cup Song. For this, the judges of Sa Re Ga Ma Pa honored her with the title "Shispriya" (Whistle Queen).

== Personal life ==
Abanti Sithi's father is Adit Kumar Dev, and her mother is Dipti Rani Dev. Adit Kumar is a businessman. She has an elder sister, Setu, and a younger sister, Smriti.

She completed her secondary education at Jamalpur Government Girls' High School and her higher secondary education from the same institution. Later, she earned her bachelor's degree from Jahangirnagar University. Once she completed her studies, she briefly worked as a lecturer at a private university.

On 15 November 2023, she married Amit Dey.

== Career ==
Abanti Sithi had a deep passion for music from childhood. Seeing her interest, her parents arranged for her to learn music from Sushanta Dev Kanu. At a young age, she also learned to play the guitar and harmonium. During her college years, she performed at various events.

In 2003 and 2004, she won national awards for folk songs and Nazrul Sangeet. In 2005, she received the prestigious Ustad Alauddin Khan Gold Medal for her performances in classical and folk music.

In 2012, she competed in CloseUp1 again and secured a place in the top 10.

She gained widespread recognition when she performed as a guest artist on the ninth season of Zee Bangla's reality show Sa Re Ga Ma Pa, mesmerizing audiences across both Bengals.

== Discography ==
| Year | Films | Music title | Film director | Ref |
|---|---|---|---|---|
| 2021 | Networker Baire | Rupkotha Jogote | Mizanur Rahman Aryan | |

== Awards ==
| Year | Award | Category | Film | Results | Ref |
|---|---|---|---|---|---|
| 2021 | Blender's Choice—The Daily Star OTT & Digital Content Awards | Best Singer | Networker Baire | Won | |
| 2022 | 23rd Meril-Prothom Alo Award | Best Female Singer | Networker Baire (Rupkotha Jogote) | Won | |
| 2026 | Bangladesh National Film Awards 2023 | Best Female Singer | Surongo | Won | |
