= Sincerely Yours, Dhaka =

2018 Bangladeshi film

- Festival release poster
- Bengali: ইতি, তোমারই ঢাকা
- Directed by: Tanvir Ahsan; Abdullah Al Noor; Saleh Sobhan Auneem; Krishnendu Chattopadhyay; Golam Kibria Farooki; Mir Mukarram Hossain; Nuhash Humayun; Mahmudul Islam; Rahat Rahman; Robiul Alam Robi; Syed Ahmed Shawki
- Written by: Rahat Rahman
- Produced by: Abu Shahed Emon
- Starring: Fazlur Rahman Babu; Nusrat Imrose Tisha; Allen Shuvro; Orchita Sporshia; Iresh Zaker; Gousul Alam Shaon; Mostafa Monwar; Manoj Pramanik; Intekhab Dinar; Ashok Bepari; Lutfur Rahman George; Rawnak Hasan; Shahtaj Monira Hashem; Shatabdi Wadud; Shahnaz Sumi; Khairul Basar
- Cinematography: Murshed Bipul; Ishtiaque Hossain Pablo; Khair Khandakar; Sheikh Rajibul Islam; Barkat Hossain Polash; Tanveer Ahmed Shovon; Tuhin Tamijul; Farhad Hossain
- Edited by: Sohel Mondol; Rahat Rahman
- Distributed by: Impress Telefilm; Netflix
- Release dates: 7 October 2018 (South Korea); 15 November 2019 (Bangladesh)
- Running time: 136 minutes
- Country: Bangladesh
- Language: Bengali

Sincerely Yours, Dhaka (Bengali: ইতি, তোমারই ঢাকা) is a 2018 Impress Telefilm drama film produced as Bangladesh's first anthology film directed by eleven individual directors. The project was developed by Bangladeshi filmmaker Abu Shahed Emon. It is a collection of gritty shorts centered on the capital city of Bangladesh, Dhaka, and the people living in its margins. It was awarded "Best Original Screenplay" at the 11th edition of the Jaipur International Film Festival (JIFF), held in India in January 2019. It is one of the first two films to enter Netflix originating from Bangladesh. It was selected as the Bangladeshi entry for Best International Feature Film at the 93rd Academy Awards, but it was not nominated. It was also screened at 51st International Film Festival of India in January 2021 in Country in focus section.

== Plot ==
In this omnibus, 11 Bangladeshi filmmakers created a love letter to the city of Dhaka representing their point of view of the lifestyle of the residents and the frequent happenings in the city.

1. The Background Artist (Nuhash Humayun) : The story is about a movie side character who are called extras.

2. Cheers (Syed Ahmed Shawki) : This story is based on psychological resentment of a girl after a breakup in love.

3. Jibon's Gun (Rahat Rahman) : A story about a teenaged gangster in Dhaka.

4. Magfirat (Robiul Alam Robi) : The story is about a car driver whose mentality get dramatically changed while working in Dhaka.

5. Sounds Good (Golam Kibria Farooki) : The whole movie set has been highlighted in the eyes of the movie soundman.

6. Obisshashe Dhaka (Mir Mukarram Hussain) : It is portrayed that going to help someone in Dhaka can turn into a danger to oneself.

7. Where, Nowhere (Tanvir Ahsan) : The director has confusingly told 3 tragic stories of a middle-class family in Dhaka in which you can only understand 1 and a half of the stories.

8. Dhaka Metro (Mahmud Hasan) : The story is about a second hand car dealer whose wife is ill but the car that would be sold for her surgery gets stolen.

9. M for Money / Murder (Abdullah Al Noor) : A story of the tragic fate of 2 corrupt industrialists.

10. Jinnah is Dead (Krishnendu Chattyapadhay) : The story is about the conflict between a Bihari mether and a Bengali resident in Bihari Camp, Mohammadpur, Dhaka.

11. Juthi (Syed Saleh Ahmed Sobhan) : It is a story about the complex psychology between men and women.

== Cast ==
- Fazlur Rahman Babu
- Johan
- Shamsi Sayeka
- Irfan Sajjad
- Naziba Bashar
- Orchita Sporshia
- Tanin Tanha
- Yash Rohan
- Ashok Bepari
- Mir Naufel Ashrafi Jisan
- Allen Shuvro
- Mushfiq Farhan
- Taufiqul Hasan Nihal
- Abidur Rahman Adour
- Rushnaf Wadud
- Anis Uz Zaman
- Shipon Hassan Akash
- Shah Tushar
- Bijoy Sikder
- Lutfur Rahman Hamim
- Mustafa Kamal Himel
- Rafiqul Alam
- Razan
- Prapto
- Shamol Mawla
- Farhana Hamid
- Mehedi Ansari
- Sohana Saba
- Nurur Rahman Bachchu
- Mohammad Pavel
- Akib Ahmed
- Sardar Saniat Hossain
- Shahtaj Monira Hashem
- Mahmuda Apon
- Rodela Rangan Riddo
- Mohammed Rakibul Hasan Reza
- Manoj Kumar Pramanik
- Dilruba Hossain Doyel
- Aref Syed
- Sharmeen Akhee
- Bappi Amin
- Arman
- Azaz Bari
- Khairul Basar as Jui's Lover
- Intekhab Dinar
- Kazi Toufiqul Islam Emon
- Lutfur Rahman George
- Elora Gohor
- Mahmudul Hasan
- Rawnak Hasan
- Ishtiaq Hassan
- Maruf Hassan
- Muktar Hossain
- Robin Khan
- Tropa Mazumder
- Mostafa Monwar
- Safa Nomoni
- Robayet Hossain Ovi
- Saiful Islam Saiful
- Hasib Shahriar
- Snata Shahreen
- Gousul Alam Shaon
- Shahnaz Sumi
- Nusrat Imrose Tisha
- Shatabdi Wadud
- Waziha
- Iresh Zaker
- Shawon Saha
- Pavel Zaman

== See also ==
- List of submissions to the 93rd Academy Awards for Best International Feature Film
- List of Bangladeshi submissions for the Academy Award for Best International Feature Film
