= Raat Jaga Phool =

- Film poster
- রাত জাগা ফুল
- Directed by: Mir Sabbir
- Written by: Mir Sabbir
- Screenplay by: Mir Sabbir
- Story by: Mir Sabbir
- Produced by: Mir Sabbir
- Starring: Mir Sabbir; Jannatul Ferdous Oishee; Abu Hurayra Tanvir; Fazlur Rahman Babu; Dilara Zaman; Sharmilee Ahmed
- Music by: Emon Chowdhury
- Production company: Phoolkuri Media Limited
- Release date: 31 December 2021
- Country: Bangladesh
- Language: Bengali

Raat Jaga Phool is a 2021 Bangladeshi Bengali-language feature film directed by Mir Sabbir in his directorial debut. The film received a government grant from Bangladesh. For his performance in the film, Mir Sabbir won the Bangladesh National Film Award for Best Actor at the 46th National Film Awards.

It stars Mir Sabbir, Jannatul Ferdous Oishee, Abu Hurayra Tanvir, and Fazlur Rahman Babu in lead roles. The movie premiered in theaters across Bangladesh on 31 December 2021.

== Plot ==
The story revolves around Rais, a simple village man who possesses a unique ability to communicate with animals and nature. When a murder occurs in his village, a dog witnesses the incident and conveys the details to Rais. As the villagers dismiss Rais's claims as madness, the narrative progresses into a fight for justice, highlighting the coexistence between humans and animals as well as nature's retribution.

== Cast ==
- Mir Sabbir as Rais
- Jannatul Ferdous Oishee
- Abu Hurayra Tanvir
- Fazlur Rahman Babu
- Dilara Zaman
- Sharmilee Ahmed
- Tanin Tanha
- Rashed Mamun Apu
- Joyraj
- Dr. Ezaz
- Naresh Bhuiyan
- Ahsanul Haq Minu

== Production ==
In 2019, the project received a government grant from the Ministry of Information of Bangladesh. Mir Sabbir wrote the story, screenplay, and dialogues for the film, marking his transition from television directing and acting to feature films. The film was produced under his banner Phoolkuri Media Limited.

== Music ==
The music for Raat Jaga Phool was composed by Emon Chowdhury. Indian playback singer Nachiketa Chakraborty rendered a song titled "Din Bodoler Din Shuru" for the film soundtrack. Prominent Bangladeshi folk singer Momotaz Begum voiced the title song "Phote Phool Phote", while Rahul Ananda voiced "Bandor Bondhu".

== Release ==
The film was theatrically released across 28 cinema halls in Bangladesh on 31 December 2021. It was later screened at various film festivals, including the "Amar Bhasha Chalachchitra 1428" festival organized by Dhaka University Film Society (DUFS) on 24 February 2022.

== Accolades ==
Raat Jaga Phool received recognition at the Bangladesh National Film Awards, the most prestigious film awards in Bangladesh.

Award	Date of ceremony	Category	Recipient(s)	Result	Ref.
Bangladesh National Film Awards	9 March 2023	Best Actor	Mir Sabbir	Won	
