= Ice Cream (2016 film) =

2016 Bangladeshi film by Redoan Rony

- Theatrical Release Poster
- Directed by: Redoan Rony
- Written by: Redoan Rony
- Produced by: Shukla Banik; Redoan Rony; Salma Adil
- Starring: Sariful Razz; Nazifa Tushi; Kumar Uday
- Cinematography: Arindam Bhattacharya
- Edited by: Khaled Mahmud
- Music by: Indradeep Dasgupta
- Production companies: Ping Pong Entertainment; The Abhi Pictures; Top of Mind Production; Popcorn Films
- Distributed by: The Abhi Pictures
- Release date: 29 April 2016
- Country: Bangladesh
- Language: Bengali

Ice Cream is a Bangladeshi coming-of-age romantic drama film written and directed by Redoan Rony and produced by Shukla Banik under the banner of Ping Pong Entertainment. It features Sariful Razz, Kumar Uday, Nazifa Tushi while ATM Shamsuzzaman, Omar Sani, Parveen Sultana Diti and Sayem Sadat in supporting roles.

The film was scheduled for released on 29 April 2016. Minar Rahman made his playback career debut with this film.

== Cast ==
- Sariful Razz
- Nazifa Tushi
- Kumar Uday
- ATM Shamsuzzaman
- Omar Sani
- Parveen Sultana Diti
- Sayem Sadat
- Sallha Khanam Nadia
