= Nazifa Tushi =

Bangladeshi model and actress

- নাজিফা তুষি
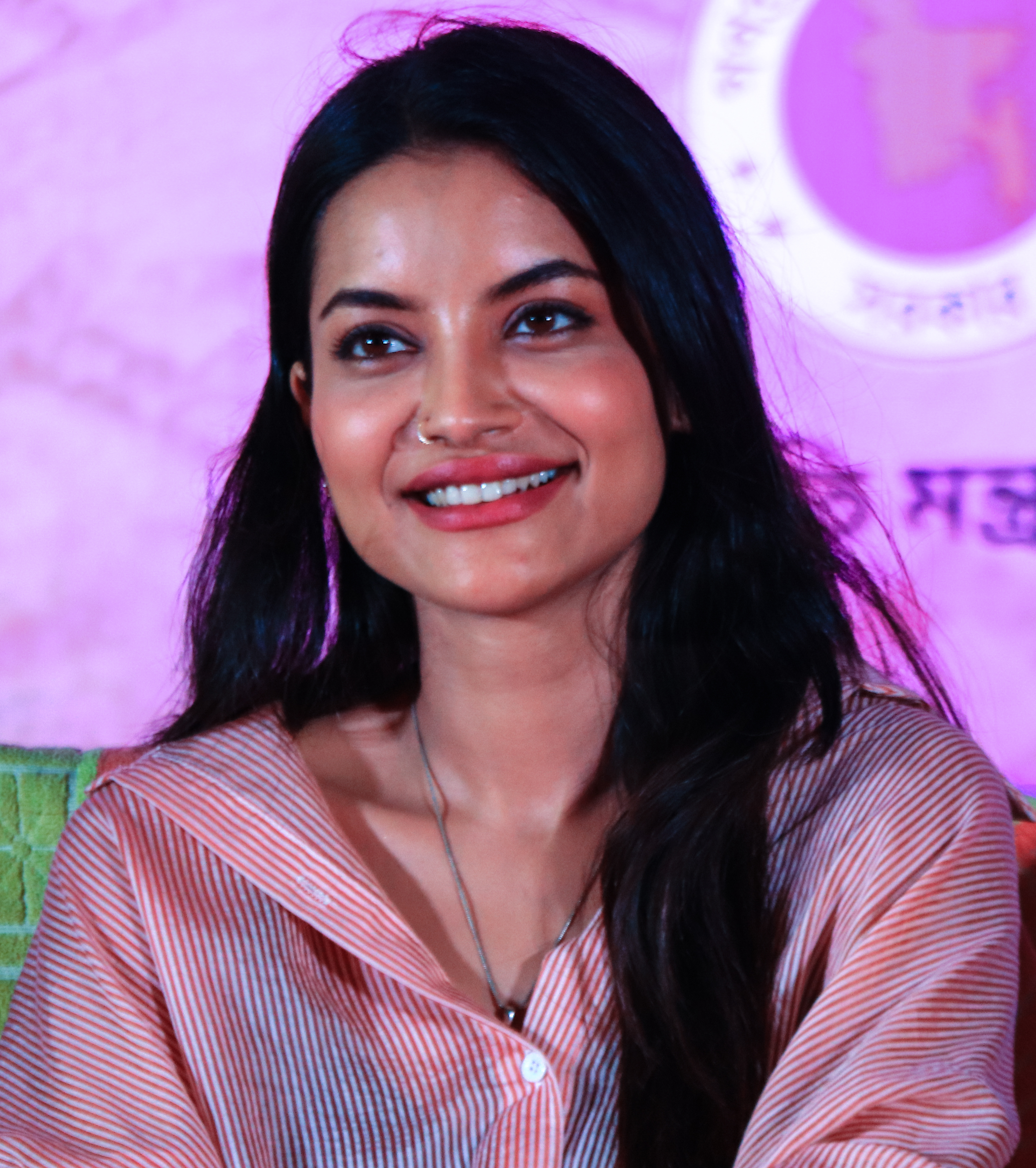
- Tushi in 2026
- Born: Nazifa Anzum Tushi
- Occupations: Actress, model, television presenter
- Years active: 2014–present
- Notable work: Hawa, Networker Baire, Syndicate
- Awards: 1st Runner-Up 2014 at Lux Channel I Superstar

Nazifa Anzum Tushi is a Bangladeshi actress, model and television presenter. She was the first runner-up 2014 in the Lux Channel I Superstar beauty pageant of Bangladesh. She is known for her roles in films like Hawa and Networker Baire and in series like Syndicate.

She graduated from the Independent University, Bangladesh.

== Career ==
Tushi was the first runner-up in the 2014 Lux Channel I Superstar beauty pageant. She then starred in the 2016 romantic drama film Ice Cream, directed by Redoan Rony. The film also features Sariful Razz and Kumar Uday.

In the twelve months after the release of Ice Cream, she made a television commercial in which she rode on the back of a scooter in Dhaka's Kuril Flyover area, and modeled in a music video for the rock song "Na". Not until late 2019 did she work in another film, Mejbaur Rahman Sumon's Hawa. She explained the several year break by saying she wanted to concentrate on her studies.

While awaiting the release of Hawa, she played Samia in the 2021 web film Networker Baire, again working alongside Razz. Shortly after the release of the film, she and three of her co-stars were hospitalized after an early hours road traffic accident in Dhaka. She later traveled to India for related surgery.

She has also appeared in the web series Syndicate. She has worked in the film is Hawa.

In 2026, Tushi starred as Annie in the series ANNiE, which was selected for its world premiere in the Spotlight: Women in Series section of the Seriencamp Festival in Cologne, Germany.

== Filmography ==
=== Feature films ===
Key
†	Denotes films that have not yet been released

Year	Film	Role	Notes	Ref.
2016	Ice Cream	Priyota	Debut film	
2021	Networker Baire	Samiya	Released on Chorki	
2021	The Dark Side Of Dhaka	Tamanna	Released on iTheatre	
2022	Hawa	Gulti	Shortlisted for the 80th Golden Globe Awards	
2026	Pressure Cooker	Reshma		
2026	Roid	Sadhu's Wife	Selected for the Tiger Competition of the 55th International Film Festival Rotterdam	
2027	Andhar †	Nadia	Completed; scheduled for release on 26 March 2027	
2027	Abar Dekha Holo †	TBA	Filming	
TBA	Suraiya †	Suraiya	In post-production. Received WCF 2025	

=== Web series ===
Year	Title	Role	Notes	Ref.
2022	Syndicate	Jobaida Yasmin Zisha	Released on Chorki	
2022	Crossroads	Norah	Released on Binge	
2026	Annie	Annie	Selected at Seriencamp	

=== Short films ===
Year	Title	Role	Notes	Ref.
2020	Nishiddho Bashor	Disha	Short film series on Binge; a segment of Bagh Bondi Singho Bondi	
2021	Othoba Premer Golpo	Farjana	Released on Bongo BD	
2022	Scooty	Anu Bahar	Released on Chorki	

== See also ==
- Mumtaheena Toya
- Anika Kabir Shokh
- Tanjin Tisha
- Pori Moni
- Sabila Nur
