= Bohemian Ghora =

- Poster
- Genre: Comedy drama
- Written by: Md Alam Bhuiyan; Amitabh Reza Chowdhury; Bidhan Chandra Das
- Directed by: Amitabh Reza Chowdhury
- Starring: Mosharraf Karim; Tanzika Amin; Runa Khan; Moushumi Hamid; Sadia Ayman; Robena Reza Jui; Farhana Hamid; Sarah Jabin Aditi; Asma Ul Husna Bristy
- Composer: Jahid Nirob
- Country of origin: Bangladesh
- Original language: Bengali
- No. of seasons: 7
- No. of episodes: 1

Production
- Producers: Md Assaduzzaman; Mahjabin Reza
- Production location: Bangladesh
- Cinematography: Kamrul Hasan Khosru
- Editors: Nitai Chand Das; Sobuj Sheikh
- Production company: Half Stop Down

Original release
- Network: Hoichoi
- Release: 5 June 2025

Bohemian Ghora is a 2025 Bangladeshi comedy-drama web series directed by Amitabh Reza Chowdhury and produced by Mahjabin Reza and Md Assaduzzaman under the production house Half Stop Down. It stars Mosharraf Karim, Tanzika Amin, Runa Khan, Moushumi Hamid, Sadia Ayman, Robena Reza Jui, Farhana Hamid, Sarah Jabin Aditi and Asma Ul Husna Bristy. It was premiered on 5 June 2025 on Hoichoi.

== Cast ==
- Mosharraf Karim as Ali Abbas
- Rakib Hossain Evon as Selim
- Sadia Ayman as Sundori Khatun
- Tanzika Amin as Noorjahan Begum
- Asma Ul Husna Bristy as Prothom Murmu
- Farhana Hamid as Joygoon
- Sarah Jabin Aditi as Surekha Akter
- Robena Reza Jui as Shefali Begum
- Runa Khan as Ambia Siddika
- Moushumi Hamid as Azmeri Haque
- Pankaj Majumder as Khorgoon
- Ashok Bepari as Mohajon Golla
- Sumon Patwary as Chairman
- Shariful Islam as Chairman's Grandson
- Amitabh Reza Chowdhury as Guest appearance
- Jessia Islam as Guest appearance
- Maeen Hasan as Truck Passenger

== Reception ==
=== Critical response ===
Shojol of Bangla Movie Database characterized the production as a blend of humor, human conflict, mystery, and realism, noting its exploration of interpersonal dynamics and bohemian lifestyles. Pritha Paramita Nag of Prothom Alo commended Bohemian Ghora for its vibrant visuals, humor and Mosharraf Karim's lead performance while noting its subtle portrayal of women's social struggles, though she felt the conclusion suffered from a rushed pacing and an unnecessary crime subplot. Arnab Sanyal of Independent Television noted for balancing comedy and emotional depth through its protagonist Abbas (Mosharraf Karim) and highlighted how the series transitions from lighthearted humor surrounding Abbas's multiple marriages to a more humanizing narrative exploring his background as an orphan and his compassionate nature.

== Awards ==
Awards	Category	Name	Result	Ref.
27th Meril-Prothom Alo Awards	Best Web Series	Bohemian Ghora	Nominated	
27th Meril-Prothom Alo Awards	Best Director	Amitabh Reza Chowdhury	Nominated	
27th Meril-Prothom Alo Awards	Best Actress	Sadia Ayman	Nominated	
