= Paap Punno =

2022 Bangladeshi film

- Film poster
- Directed by: Giasuddin Selim
- Produced by: Abu Shahed Emon
- Starring: Chanchal Chowdhury; Siam Ahmed; Afsana Mimi; Shahnaz Sumi; Fazlur Rahman Babu; Mamunur Rashid
- Music by: Emon Chowdhury
- Production company: Impress Telefilm
- Distributed by: Shwapno Scarecrow
- Release date: 20 May 2022
- Country: Bangladesh
- Language: Bengali
- Box office: ৳1 crore (US$82,000)

Paap Punno (English: Sin and virtue) is a 2022 Bangladeshi Bengali-language romantic drama film written and directed by Giasuddin Selim. It is the third film directed by him and also it is the last part of his Love Trilogy (Other films of the trilogy is Monpura and Swapnajaal). The film marks the debut film of Shahnaz Sumi as lead actress.

== Plot ==
Khorshed is the chairman of his area. He genuinely wants to serve the people. He is the right-hand man of the local MP, while Gaosul Alam Shaon is his left-hand man. When a relative of Shawon rapes a village girl, Khorshed wants to punish the rapist. A police sub-inspector loyal to Shawn wants to save the rapist by claiming that he did not take the law into his own hands. The police arrest him because of Khorshed, but Shaon's men come to Kopa to Khorshed. Khorshed's bodyguard, Vista Al Amin, pulled out a pistol and fired, but Shawn's men fled.

Baul Ratan's land is in the process of being taken over by the government and Shaun wants to take it away. Khorshed stood up for Ratan. This increased the conflict between Khorshed and Shaon, MPO failed to resolve this conflict.

‘Vaista’ Al Amin loves Khorshed’s daughter Sathi. Al Amin's mother Parul, who works at Khorshed's house, feels this love. He requested Khorshed's wife to send her son abroad. Khorshed disagrees. As Al Amin and Sathi's love deepens, Al Amin's mother informs Khorshed's wife. When Khorshed's wife informed Khorshed, he changed his mind and brought Al Amin to Dhaka to send him abroad. On his way back by train, Khorshed Ratan got involved in the murder case.

Khorshed goes to jail. One day news of Al Amin's death came in the newspaper. Al Amin's mother goes to the jail alone to meet Khorshid. He informs him of Al Amin's death saying that Al Amin is his son. Khorshed is in a daze, he doesn't want to meet his wife and daughter in prison. Later he wants to meet Al Amin's mother. The trial resulted in Khorshed being hanged, it is understood that Khorshed had killed Al Amin before being sent abroad.

== Cast ==
- Chanchal Chowdhury as Khorshed
- Afsana Mimi as Parul
- Siam Ahmed as Al-Amin
- Shahnaz Sumi as Sathi
- Fazlur Rahman Babu as Sub-Inspector Nurul Haque
- Mamunur Rashid as a M.P
- Farzana Chumki as Rabeya
- Gausul Alam Shaon
- Monir Khan Shimul a relative of Shaon

== Crew ==
- Iqbal Kabir Joel as Editor, Sound Designer
- Barkat Hossain Polash as Cinematographer
- Emon Chowdhury as Music Composer
- Shipra Debnath as Script supervisor
- Zuairijah Mou as Chief Assistant Director
- Yeamin Muzumder as Casting Director
- Sabbir Ahmed Shohag as Line Producer
- Anowarul Haque as Art Director
- Sharmin Mukta as Costume Designer
- Turan Munshi as Production Manager
- Robin Khan as Make-up Artist

== Production ==
The shooting started in August 2019. The film's director completed the filming before 2020. One year later, on January 15, the film was censored.

== Release ==
The film was released on May 20, 2022 in 20 cinemas in Bangladesh. It has also been released in several movie theaters in Canada and the United States.

== Music ==
Its first song was released on YouTube in April 2022.

Track listing
No.	Title	Lyrics	Singer(s)	Length
1.	"Chokh gelo pakhi"	Bijoy Sarker	Boga Taleb	4:00
2.	"Tor sathe namlam re pothe"	Isteaque Ahmed	Emon Chowdhury and Atia Anisha	2:52
