= Ayesha Mousumi =

Ayesha Mousumi আয়েশা মৌসুমী
- Genres: pop, film score
- Occupations: Singer, Model
- Instrument: Vocal
- Years active: 2012–present
- Labels: CMV Music, Sangeeta Music
- Spouse: Taslim Mazumder (m. 2022)

Ayesha Mousumi is a Bangladeshi pop singer and model. She began her music career in 2012 after participating in the reality show "Power Voice" 2012 on Channel 9, which brought her recognition in the Bangladeshi music scene. Since then, she has released several albums and singles such as "Makeup Shundori," "Bolona," "Char Okkhore Bhalobashi," and "Ovimani Mon" etc. She is also an enlisted artist of Bangladesh Television (BTV)

== Career ==
Ayesha began learning music when she was six years old. Her mother enrolled her at Shishu Academy, where she completed a two-year music course. Later, she studied Nazrul Sangeet and folk music at the Bangladesh Shilpakala Academy. When she was in seventh grade, she started learning classical music with Ustad Subir Chakraborty. Ayesha Mousumi entered the music industry in 2012 through the reality show "Power Voice". Her first original song was "Sada Kalo". In 2015, she became known for the song "Chander Gaye Chand Legese," in collaboration with DJ Rahat. Since then, she has regularly worked on albums, singles, and film soundtracks. Some of the films she has lent her voice to include Captain Khan, Shesh Bazi, and Poran. Ayesha has also performed in various concerts both in Bangladesh and abroad. She made her acting debut opposite Ziaul Faruq Apurba in a solo drama.

In celebration of 50 years of Bangladesh's independence and the birth centenary of Bangabandhu Sheikh Mujibur Rahman, 50 artistes including Ayesha Mousumi, contributed to a new rendition of the national anthem, Amar Sonar Bangla.

Indian singer Neha Kakkar performed in Dhaka in 2016. The event opened with performances by Ayesha Mousumi, and Bangladeshi artists Anika and Shafi Mondol. Ayesha Mousumi began the concert with the song 'De De Pal Tule De'.

== Early life ==
Ayesha Mousumi completed her honors in graphic design from Shanto-Mariam University. In 2022, Ayesha married Taslim Mazumder through a virtual Zoom call.

== Discography ==
=== Film soundtracks ===
| Year | Film Name | Song name | Lyrics | Co-artist | References |
|---|---|---|---|---|---|
| 2018 | Boy Friend | "Biyer Gaan" | Rasel Mahmud | | |
| 2018 | Captain Khan | "Captain Khan" | Sudip Kumar Dip | Sahriar Rafat | |
| 2022 | Poran | "Biyer Gaan" | Rasel Mahmud | | |

=== TV Drama ===
| Year | Drama Name | Song name | Co-artist | References |
|---|---|---|---|---|
| 2020 | XChange | "Dil Dance Mare" | Yeasin Hossain Neru | |
| 2020 | OCD (Obsessive Compulsive Disorder) | "Yearki" | Nur Nobi | |
| 2021 | 100% Fake | "Chaira De Ma Kainda Bachi" | Sajib Das | |
| 2021 | Tipu Sultana | "Amar Sweet Heart" | Yeasin Hossain Neru | |
| 2022 | Just Friend | "Just Friend" | Sajib Das | |

=== Singles ===
| Year | Song name | Co-artist | Label | References |
|---|---|---|---|---|
| 2015 | "Chader Gaye Chad Legeche" | | | |
| 2016 | "Pagol Chara Duniya Calena" | | | |
| 2016 | "Taire Naire" | | | |
| 2017 | "O Mousumi" | | Sangeeta | |
| 2018 | "Ovinmani Mon" | | CMV | |
| 2018 | "Tomrai Bangladesh" | Shawon Gaanwala | | |
| 2018 | "Tumi Parla" | Belal Khan | | |
| 2019 | "Mon" | | | |
| 2019 | "Bangabandhur Jonmodin" | Parvez Sazzad | | |
| 2020 | "Maa" | | | |
| 2021 | "Bolona" | | | |
| 2021 | "Makeup Shundori" | | | |
| 2021 | "Buk Chin Chin Korche 2.0" | Shafiq Tuhin | Anupam Recording Media | |
| 2022 | "Eid Mubarak Eid" | Muhin Khan, Sania Sultana Liza, Mehrab | | |
| 2023 | "Char Okkhore Bhalobashi" | | | |
| 2024 | "Amaro Porano Jaha Chay" | Shah Hamza | | |
| 2024 | "Aula Jhaula Pola" | Pulak Adhikary | | |
