= Insaaf (2025 film) =

- Poster
- Directed by: Sanjoy Somadder
- Written by: Nazim Ud Daula
- Story by: Sanjoy Somadder
- Starring: Sariful Razz; Tasnia Farin; Mosharraf Karim
- Music by: Habib Wahid; Mila; Protic Hasan; Masha
- Production company: Titas Kothachitro
- Release date: June 7, 2025
- Running time: 150 Minutes
- Country: Bangladesh
- Language: Bangla
- Budget: ৳2 crore
- Box office: ৳5.20 crore

Insaaf - Tale of Legends is a 2025 Bangladeshi action thriller film directed by Sanjoy Somadder produced by Titas Kothachitro, co-produced by TOT Films. The film starring Sariful Razz and Tasnia Farin in the lead roles and Mosharraf Karim as Cameo. Film Gets positive reviews who praised its cinematography, visuals, soundtrack, Cast performances and action sequences but criticized the plot and excessive violence.

== Cast ==
- Sariful Razz as Yusuf/Lavu Master
- Tasnia Farin as ASP Jahan Khan
- Mosharraf Karim as Shamsher, a doctor
- Don as Kana Rashid
- Fazlur Rahman Babu as Yusuf's father
- Misha Sawdagor as Sushil Shaheen
- Chanchal Chowdhury (Special Appearance)
- Tiger Robi

== Production ==
Following the making of Indian film Manush (2023), with Jeet, director Sanjoy Somadder announced his Bangladeshi film. The film reportedly features Sariful Razz in the lead role, with Tasnia Farin cast opposite him, marking her major commercial debut. Channel i also confirmed that Mosharraf Karim will portray a negative character in the film. In an interview with bdnews24.com, Somadder confirmed that the film's title would be finalized as either Inquilab or Insaaf. The story and screenplay of the film are being written by Nazim Ud Doula, with production by Titas Kathachitra. The film is produced by Titas Kathachitra, marking the company's return to film production after a long hiatus. Prior to Insaaf, the company had produced 31 films. The film is co-produced by TOT Films.

Principal photography for the film began in February 2025.

== Music ==
The song titled "Prem Pukure Boroshi," was composed and arranged by Shouquat Ali Imon, with lyrics written by Sudip Kumar and voice given by singer Mila Islam.

== Marketing ==
The first-look poster of the film was unveiled on 25 April 2025, featuring leading man Sariful Razz holding a bloodied axe with a faint, menacing smile on his lips. Second poster was unveiled on 4 May, featuring Mosharraf Karim in never seen before avatar.

== Release ==
Insaaf was released in theatres during Eid-ul-Azha 2025 as part of a lineup of major Dhallywood films for the festive box office season.

== Sequel ==
The sequel, titled Insaaf 2, began shooting in November 2025 and is expected to release in 2026.

== Criticism ==
Following the unveiling of the third character poster on 11 May, which featured Tasnia Farin, the film faced criticism over allegations of copying the poster of the 2023 Korean film Kill Boksoon.

== Awards ==
Year	Awards	Category	Result	Ref.
2026	Meril-Prothom Alo Awards	Best Film	Nominated	
