= Birotto =

Bangladeshi thriller drama film

- Official poster of the film
- Bengali: বীরত্ব
- Directed by: Saidul Islam Rana
- Written by: Saidul Islam Rana
- Screenplay by: Saidul Islam Rana
- Produced by: Shukla Banik
- Starring: Mamnun Hasan Emon; Nipun Akter; Nishat Nawar Salwa; Intekhab Dinar; Ahsan Habib Nasim
- Cinematography: SR Nihad
- Edited by: Mahfuzul Haque Ashique
- Music by: Golam Rabbi Shohag
- Production company: Ping Pong Entertainment
- Distributed by: The Abhi Kathachitra
- Release date: 16 September 2022
- Running time: 154 minutes
- Country: Bangladesh
- Language: Bengali
- Budget: ৳1 crore
- Box office: ৳3 crore

Birotto (Bengali: বীরত্ব, transl. Heroism) is a 2022 Bangladeshi thriller drama film directed by Saidul Islam Rana and produced by Ping-Pong Entertainment. The film stars Emon, Nipun, Salwa and Intekhab Dinar. It is Rana's directorial debut as well as the first feature film of actress Nishat Nawar Salwa.

== Cast ==
- Emon as Dr. Raju
- Nishat Nawar Salwa as Dr. Dinat
- Nipun as Luthfa
- Muntaha Amelia as Puspa
- Intekhab Dinar as Musa Chowdhuri
- Ahsan Habib Nasim as Masum
- Jayanta Chattopadhyay as Dr. Moniruzzaman
- Kochi Khandokar as MP
- Mahamudul Islam Mithu as Mayor
- Monira Mithu as Lawyer
- Arman Parvez Murad as lawyer
- Shilpi Sarkar Apu as Dr. Raju's mother
- Hanna Shelly as Dinat's father
- Sabiha Zaman as Dinat's mother
- Pirzada Shahidul Harun as George
- Ranjan Dutta as Mr. Pasha
- Shamim Visti as Police Officer Aman
- Dicon Noor as Dubai based businessman
- Tanvir Rizvi as Choton
- Jasmin Akter as Parul
- Rumana Swarna as Kusum
- Rimu Roja Khandokar as nurse
- Rawnak Hasan as police officer
- Misty Zannat as herself, special appearance in the song "Vijiye De"

== Plot ==
The film follows Dr. Raju, a physician at a government hospital near a brothel area. Alongside treating patients, he raises awareness among sex workers about human trafficking and drug abuse.

One of the sex workers, Lutfar, falls in love with Masum, a trafficker involved in drugs and women smuggling. She becomes pregnant, but when Masum pressures her to help in trafficking under the promise of marriage, she refuses. Instead, she turns against him, even sacrificing her relationship.

Lutfar’s struggle continues as Masum abandons her and their unborn child. Despite social stigma, she decides to give birth. After her death, Dr. Raju takes responsibility for raising the child, sacrificing his career and personal life to nurture the baby with fatherly love. He resigns from his hospital job and moves to a new place to raise the child.

The story takes another turn when a DNA test reveals Masum as the biological father of Lutfar’s child. The child becomes the target of a trafficking ring that plans to smuggle him to Dubai for organ trade. Faced with this, Masum’s conscience awakens. Overcome with paternal emotions, he confesses the truth to Dr. Raju and urges him to escape with the child.

== Music ==
Birotto

Soundtrack album by Imran Mahmudul, Puja, Parvez, Ankita Bhattacharyya
- Released: 2022
- Length: 14:00
- Language: Bengali
- Label: Ping-Pong Entertainment
- Producer: Golam Rabbi Shohag

The film has a total of 3 songs. Music direction was done by Golam Rabbi Shohag. Artists of the songs were Imran Mahmudul, Puja, Parvez, Ankita Bhattacharyya.

Birotto Soundtrack – Track listing
No.	Title	Lyrics	Singer	Length
1.	Valobashi Bola Hoye Jay	Saidul Islam Rana	Imran Mahmudul, Puja	3:56
2.	O Jibon	Anurup Aich	Parvez Sazzad	5:29
3.	Uru Uru Mon	Ranjan Dutta	Ankita Bhattacharyya	3:32

== Critical reception ==
Zahid Akbar of The Daily Star wrote "an uptick in the position of Bengali films once again".

The Daily Kaler kantho wrote "Emon reportedly portrayed a unique part, according to the spectators".

== See also ==
- Cinema of Bangladesh
