= Sinpaat =

2024 Bangladeshi crime drama television series

- Official poster
- Genre: Crime drama
- Created by: Mohammad Touqir Islam
- Screenplay by: Mohammad Touqir Islam; Omar Masum; Mainul Islam Milon; Amit Rudra; Khalid Saifullah Saif
- Directed by: Mohammad Touqir Islam
- Starring: Sohel Sheikh; Mohammad Rifat Bin Manik; Jinnat Ara; Shibli Noman
- Composer: Nabarun Bose
- Country of origin: Bangladesh
- Original language: Bengali
- No. of seasons: 1
- No. of episodes: 7

Production
- Producer: Mohammad Touqir Islam
- Production locations: Pabna, Rajshahi
- Cinematography: Mohammad Touqir Islam
- Editor: Songlap Bhowmick
- Production company: Footprint Film Production

Original release
- Network: Chorki
- Release: 11 January 2024

Sinpaat is a 2024 Bangladeshi crime drama streaming television series directed by Mohammad Touqir Islam and it is written by Muhammad Touqir Islam, Omar Masum, Khalid Saifullah Saif, Amit Rudra and Minul Islam Milon. It produced by Footprint Film Production and it was streaming on Chorki on 11 January 2024.

Jinnat Ara won the 26th Meril-Prothom Alo Awards in Best Actress category for her performance in the series.

== Cast ==
- Sohel Sheikh as Sohel
- Mohammad Rifat Bin Manik as Fazu
- Jinnat Ara as Duru
- Shibli Noman as Habibul Bashar
- Pranab Ghosh
- Tanjina Rahman Tasnim
- Raju Ahmed

== Awards ==
Year	Award	Category	Winner	Result	Ref.
2025	26th Meril-Prothom Alo Awards	Best Actress (OTT)	Jinnat Ara	Won	
2025	Blender's Choice-The Daily Star OTT & Digital Content Awards	Best Director (OTT)	Mohammad Touqir Islam	Won	
2025	Blender's Choice-The Daily Star OTT & Digital Content Awards	Best Series	Sinpaat	Won	
2025	Blender's Choice-The Daily Star OTT & Digital Content Awards	Best Actress	Jinnat Ara	Won	
2025	Blender's Choice-The Daily Star OTT & Digital Content Awards	Best Sound Design	Adip Singh Manki	Won	

== Reception ==
Mahmud Newaz Joy of Desh Rupantor praised and wroted "All in all, ‘Sinpat’ turns out to be a fantastic series".

Arnab Sanyal of Independent Television give rating for the series 2.5 out of 5 and wroted "The music and background score were also quite enjoyable".
