= Pressure Cooker (2026 film) =

2026 Bangladeshi film

- Film poster
- Bengali: প্রেশার কুকার
- Directed by: Raihan Rafi
- Written by: Raihan Rafi
- Screenplay by: Raihan Rafi; Mehedi Hasan Moon; Shiam Shams Tusto
- Produced by: Raihan Rafi; Faridur Reza Sagar
- Starring: Shobnom Bubly; Nazifa Tushi; Mariya Hossain Shanto; Snigdha Chowdhury
- Cinematography: Xoaher Musavvir
- Edited by: Simit Roy Antar
- Music by: Adit Rahman
- Production companies: Kanon Films; Impress Telefilm
- Distributed by: Impress Telefilm
- Release date: 19 March 2026
- Running time: 153 minutes
- Country: Bangladesh
- Language: Bengali
- Budget: ৳2.5 crore (US$200,000)
- Box office: ৳3 crore (US$240,000)

Pressure Cooker (Bengali: প্রেশার কুকার) is a 2026 Bangladeshi Bengali language hyperlink drama-thriller directed by Raihan Rafi. The film features an ensemble cast led by Shobnom Bubly, Nazifa Tushi, Maria Hossain Shanto, and Snigdha Chowdhury.

Produced under Kanon Films and Impress Telefilm, with Rafi making his debut as co-producer alongside Faridur Reza Sagar, it marks Impress Telefilm's return to Eid theatrical releases after 21 years. Pressure Cooker was theatrically released in Bangladesh on 19 March 2026, during Eid al-Fitr. The film received generally positive reviews from critics, who praised its direction, socially relevant themes the performances of the ensemble cast, particularly that of Nazifa Tushi. Director Raihan Rafi was commended for his handling of a multi-narrative structure and for presenting a grounded portrayal of urban struggles faced by women of Dhaka. However, the film's dark tone, explicit content, and intense subject matter drew criticism from some reviewers, who felt it limited its accessibility to mainstream audiences. The film performed well at the box office and became one of the highest grossing Bangladeshi films of 2026.

== Plot ==
The film uses a hyperlink narrative to explore interconnected stories of four women facing social, personal, and psychological pressures in urban Dhaka. The official synopsis states that Dhaka is a "pressure cooker" for women: if their screams cannot be endured, the whistle blows. Neither can they leave the city, nor can the city leave them.

In Dhaka, four women navigate systemic exploitation, deceit, and crime, leading to a tragic series of interconnected events.

Reshma (Nazifa Tushi), a young mother living in Dhaka, struggles to support her son after her husband abruptly disappears. To afford his boarding school expenses and manage her daily living, she stays with her brother and sister-in-law while taking a job at a local establishment presented as a beauty parlor, which is actually an adult massage center. Facing financial hardship, taxi driver Jalal accepts a deal from a wealthy moneylender, Adnan Seikh (Misha Sawdagor), to marry off his young daughter, Ananya, in exchange for wiping out his massive debts. Ananya, however, is secretly in love with another man, Shakil, who continuously avoids her requests to marry.

At the massage parlor, the owner introduces Reshma to the moneylender, Adnan Seikh, as a client. Unaware of the true nature of the job, Reshma refuses his sexual advances, causing friction with her colleague Samia, who urges her to adapt to survive in the city. Meanwhile, Tanmoy, a well-meaning friend enamored with Reshma, regularly visits her, unaware of the full scope of her struggles.

While riding a bus across a bridge, Reshma unexpectedly spots her missing husband walking with another woman. She confronts him, but he denies knowing her and flees. Later, she manages to locate him in a nearby neighborhood. When confronted, her husband tearfully claims he was forced into a second marriage to pay off a 200,000-taka debt. Believing his story, Reshma arranges to sell her inheritance rights to her brother for 200,000 taka and hands the money to her husband. However, he immediately absconds with the cash, abandoning her permanently.

Devastated and kicked out of her brother's home after a fight with her sister-in-law, Reshma turns to Samia for shelter. Hardened by betrayal and urgent financial need, Reshma transforms her appearance, adopts a cynical mindset, and fully embraces escort work at the parlor, quickly becoming its most requested employee now known by the adapted name Pakhi.

Parallel storylines unfold across Dhaka. Ajmeri, the wife of an elderly political leader, Adnan Shaikh, conspires with her secret lover to assassinate her husband to escape his abuse and seize his political influence. Ananya runs away on her wedding eve with her lover, who takes a hitman job funded by Ananna to finance their escape, successfully killing the political leader. A corrupt police inspector investigating the murder systematically covers up evidence while abusing his power, including accidentally killing a young man during a raid on a local lodge and staging it as a street brawl.

Tragedy reaches a climax when the corrupt inspector visits the massage parlor and demands service from Reshma. During the encounter, the inspector suffers a fatal medical reaction to medication and dies in the room. Fearing murder charges, Reshma and the parlor manager, wrap his body and Reshma calls Jalal to drive them.

During a stop at a petrol station, Jalal notices the corpse in the back seat. An argument ensues inside the moving vehicle, leading Reshma to strangle Jalal with her scarf. The struggle causes a violent crash: Samia dies on impact, and Jalal is critically injured. As Reshma steps out to finish off the surviving driver, an oncoming lorry crashes into the scene, killing her instantly.

In the aftermath, Shakil, who always cared for Reshma despite her tragic path, steps in to adopt and raise her young son, leaving a cautionary reflection on how extreme pressure and desperate choices yield tragic consequences.

== Cast ==
- Shobnom Bubly as Azmery Shiekh
- Nazifa Tushi as Reshma / Pakhi
- Mariya Shanto as Ananya
- Snigdha Chowdhury as Raka
- Faizul Yameen as Shakeel
- Azizul Hakim as Liyakat
- Fazlur Rahman Babu as Ruhul Amin
- Misha Sawdagor as Adnan Shiekh
- Naima Alam Maha as Samia
- Shahiduzzaman Selim as Barkat
- Rizvi Riju as Tanmay
- Prantar Dastider as Shanto
- Chanchal Chowdhury as Aminul (special appearance)
- Gazi Rakayet as Political leader

== Production ==
Raihan Rafi wrote the story, screenplay, and dialogue. The film is described as a hybrid that blends artistic and commercial elements, neither purely art-house nor conventional mainstream, using a hyperlink structure where multiple stories converge.

The film is dedicated to the late filmmaker Tareque Masud, whom Rafi credits as his mentor and inspiration for entering filmmaking. Rafi stated the dedication was fitting for his first produced film, with themes of liberation echoing Masud's work.

Principal photography included Shobnom Bubly joining the shoot in January 2026, reuniting with Rafi after nearly three years.

== Music ==
No.	Title	Lyrics	Music	Singer	Length
1.	"Borai Kore"	Ankan Kumar	Jahid Nirob	Ankan Kumar	2:22
2.	"Khoye Khoye"	Tonmoy Parvez	Arafat Mohsin	Mithun Chakra	2:45
3.	"Tuntuni"	Pallab Vai, Tanveer Ahmed	Tanveer Ahmed	Pallab Vai, Tanveer Ahmed	2:10

== Marketing ==
Marketing included the first official poster in February 2026, featuring the four leads in traditional attire, and a promotional "First Whistle" preview in early March.

== Release ==
Pressure Cooker received an uncut "A" (adults only) certificate from the Bangladesh Film Certification Board. It was released theatrically on 19 March 2026, coinciding with Eid-ul-Fitr, competing with other major releases.

== Reception ==
=== Critical response ===
Writing in The Daily Times of Bangladesh, Md Ishtiak Hossain gave Pressure Cooker a positive review, highlighting its shift from traditional male-centric narratives to focusing on female agency and urban survival in Dhaka. Hossain praised director Raihan Rafi's use of a hyperlinked narrative structure to connect the lives of four women from diverse backgrounds, describing Nazifa Tushi's emotional performance as a standout in recent Bangladeshi cinema. While noting narrative imbalances and limited screen time for secondary characters played by Shobnom Bubly and Snigdha Chowdhury, he commended the film's realistic tone, striking cinematography, urban background score, and grounded supporting performances by the male cast. Hossain concluded that despite its minor flaws, the film serves as a bold and reflective contribution to contemporary Bangladeshi cinema.

Writing for The Business Standard Graduates, Nazmul Haque Parthib gave Pressure Cooker a strongly favorable assessment, praising director Raihan Rafi for taking creative risks and avoiding predictable storytelling conventions. Parthib highlighted the film's non-linear narrative and nuanced portrayal of four Dhaka women navigating socioeconomic hardship. He singled out Nazifa Tushi's performance as exceptional, tracing her character's plausible evolution from a naive single mother to a self-determined survivor. Additionally, he praised Fazlur Rahman Babu's layered and sophisticated performance in the second half, along with notable supporting turns by Chanchal Chowdhury and Shahiduzzaman Selim. Concluding that the film excels by refusing to offer comfortable or sanitized endings, Parthib described it as a thought-provoking cinematic achievement.

Writing for The Business Standard, Adiba Khondokar offered a mixed to favorable review of Pressure Cooker, commending director Raihan Rafi for crafting a courageous, female-led commercial narrative that strays from conventional cinematic formulas. Khondokar praised Nazifa Tushi's compelling performance as Reshma, noting her ability to portray a complex, multi-layered journey from innocence to compromise in the face of urban hardship. She also highlighted Fazlur Rahman Babu's standout performance as a menacing police inspector, alongside strong supporting work from the broader ensemble cast. However, the reviewer noted several technical and narrative flaws, including a chaotic hyperlink structure, uneven dialogue quality, choppy editing, and awkward visual framing. Despite these technical inconsistencies, Khondokar concluded that the film's striking visuals, realism, and willingness to tackle bold themes make it a significant and commendable effort in modern Bangladeshi cinema.

Writing for Prothom Alo, Sheikh Hafijur Rahman delivered a positive review of Pressure Cooker, characterizing it as a poignant psychological thriller and feminist narrative that critiques patriarchal urban structures and the socioeconomic struggles of middle-class women in Dhaka. Rahman lauded director Raihan Rafi's directional skill, sharp dialogues, and use of a hyperlinked storytelling style, noting that the city of Dhaka itself is portrayed as a living, dynamic character. While pointing out that the film features unfiltered adult language and mature themes warranting its adult rating he commended the director for maintaining artistic restraint without resorting to gratuitous vulgarity. Rahman concluded that through its powerful character developments and symbolic themes of resilience, Pressure Cooker leaves a lasting impression on the audience.
