= Rashaduzzaman Shohag =

Bangladeshi film editor

Mohammad Rashaduzzaman, professionally known as Rashaduzzaman Shohag, is a Bangladeshi film editor and colorist. He has worked in the post-production industry of Bangladesh for more than fourteen years, editing a range of content including television commercials, dramas, documentaries, and feature films.

== Career ==
Shohag began his career at Maasranga Production House as a video editor and colorist. Later in his career, he took on roles with leading production companies such as PRAN-RFL Group, BBC Media Action, and others. Subsequently, he founded a post-production company named Post Circle, which he continues to manage.

Throughout his career, he has edited and color-graded thousands of television commercials. His work also includes single-episode dramas, drama serials, music videos, and documentaries. He has worked with both domestic and international brands on advertising content. His editing credits include several full-length Bengali feature films such as:

- Piprabidya (Ant Story)
- Komola Rocket
- Chuye Dile Mon
- Doob - No Bed of Roses
- Ayesha
- Kathbirali

He has also edited the films Jamdani and Adventure of Sundarbans, both of which are Bengali-language productions; Jamdani received a grant from the Government of Bangladesh. In recent years, Shohag has been involved in the editing of both films and web series.

== Filmography ==
The following is a list of selected works edited by Rashaduzzaman Shohag, including feature films, short films, television movies, and television mini-series:

Year	Title	Type of Production
2013	Piprabidya (Ant Story)	Feature Film
2015	Chuye Dile Mon	Feature Film
2017	Doob - No Bed of Roses	Feature Film
2018	Komola Rocket	Feature Film
2018	Putro	Feature Film
2018	The Last Post Office	Short Film
2018	Ayesha	TV Movie
2019	Neel Dorja	TV Movie
2019	Maya - The Lost Mother	Feature Film
2019	Kathbirali	Feature Film
2019	Bhalo Theko Ful	Short Film
2019	Dwitiyo Koishor	TV Movie
2021	Otithi	TV Movie
2021	Ladies & Gentlemen	TV Series
2022	Deshantor	Feature Film
2022	Mayashalik	TV Movie
2022	Payer Chhap	Feature Film
2023	Adventure of Sundarbans	Feature Film
2023	Myself Allen Swapan	TV Series
2023	Overtrump	TV Mini Series
2023	Not a Fiction	Short Film

== Awards ==
Year	Awarding Body	Category	Work Title
2021	BABISAS (Bangladesh Binodon Sangbadik Samiti)	Best Colorist	Ladies & Gentlemen
2022	BABISAS (Bangladesh Binodon Sangbadik Samiti)	Best Editor	Mayashalik
2024	TRUB (Television Reporters Unity of Bangladesh)	Best Editor	Mayashalik
