= Mir Sabbir =

Bangladeshi actor and director

- মীর সাব্বির
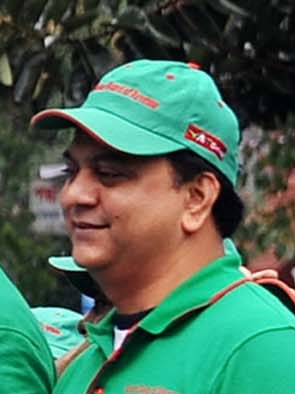
- Sabbir in 2017
- Occupations: Actor, director
- Years active: since 1999
- Spouse: Farzana Chumki (m. 2003)
- Children: 2

Mir Sabbir is a Bangladeshi actor and director. He won Bangladesh National Film Award for Best Actor for his role in the film Raat Jaga Phool (2021).

== Early life and education ==
Sabbir's ancestral origin is in Barguna district of Barisal division. He moved to Dhaka to study.

== Career ==
In 1999, Sabbir debuted his television acting career in the drama Putro.

Sabbir debuted his television drama direction in Barisal Bonam Noakhali and drama-serial direction in Maqbul."Noashal" is a very popular Television drama serial directed by Mir Sabbir.

Sabbir made his directorial with the film Raat Jaga Phool, released on 31 December 2021. He went on winning Bangladesh National Film Award for Best Actor for acting in this film.

== Personal life ==
Sabbir is married to actress Farzana Chumki since 14 February 2003. Chumki became first runner-up in Lux-Anandadhara Photogenic Contest in 1999. Together they performed in television dramas including Brishtir Pore, Poribar o Ekti Company, Bou+Boi and Mohonpurer Golpo. They have two sons, Farshad (aged 19) and Sandid.

== Works ==
=== Film ===
- Ki Jadu Korila (2008)
- Valobasha Emoni Hoy (2016)

=== Drama ===
- Noashal
- Prem Nagor
- Aladin
- Parajaboti Mon
- Patorer Kanna
- Baap Beta Dewana
- Baap Beta Duyer Upar
- Baap Beta Biye (2018)

=== Director ===
- Raat Jaga Phool (2021)
