= Sariful Razz =

Bangladesh actor and model

- শরিফুল রাজ
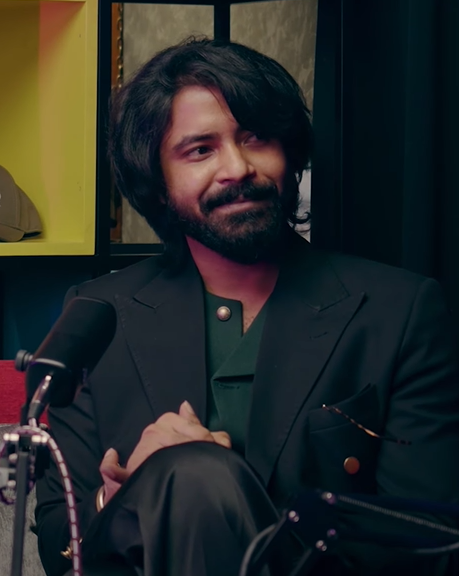
- Razz in 2024
- Born: 18 November 1991 (age 34); Alampur, Kasba, Brahmanbaria, Bangladesh
- Occupations: Actor, model
- Years active: 2012–present
- Spouse: Pori Moni (m. 2021; div. 2023) (Note: multiple sources:)
- Children: 1

Sariful Razz (born 18 November 1991) (Note: multiple sources:) is a Bangladeshi actor and model who workes primarily in Dhallywood cinema. He made his debut in the Dhallywood industry with the film Ice Cream (2016).

Razz established himself as a leading actor with critical and commercial success through films like No Dorai (2019), Networker Baire (2021), Gunin (2022), Poran (2022), Hawa (2022), Damal (2022), Kajolrekha (2024), Deyaler Desh (2024), Omar (2024), Insaaf (2025) and Bonolota Express (2026). (Note: multiple sources:)

== Early life and education ==
Sariful Razz was born in Brahmanbaria, Bangladesh, but spent his childhood mostly in Sylhet due to his father's professional placement. He studied at The Aided High School and Madan Mohan College in Sylhet. After passing Higher Secondary in 2009, he came to Dhaka for higher studies and eventually became involved in modelling.

== Career ==
Before making his debut in Dhallywood, Razz worked as a ramp model. Besides, he also worked in commercials.

Raaz made his debut in Dhallywood in 2016. The name of his first film was Ice Cream, where he acted opposite Nazifa Tushi.

In 2019, the second film of Raaz was released. The name of his second film was No Dorai, where he acted opposite Sunerah Binte Kamal.

The next three films of Raaz were released in 2022. They are Poran, Hawa, and Damal.

== Personal life ==
On 17 October 2021, Razz married Pori Moni, a Dhallywood actress and co-star of his from the film Gunin. The information about the marriage was kept secret from the media and public until the actress became pregnant. As per news from January 2022, they were expecting a baby together. Razz and Pori Moni became parents of a boy, Shaheem Muhammad Rajya, on 10 August 2022.

On 31 December, he and Pori Moni got separated as Pori Moni confirmed her separation from Razz via social media, later stating that she left his house with son Rajya a day prior.

=== Controversy ===
On 30 May 2023, a few private videos of Razz with three actresses, Sunerah Binte Kamal, Tanjin Tisha, and Nazifa Tushi, were uploaded on his Facebook profile, indicating his relationship with them. Thus, Pori Moni sought divorce from Razz again on 6 June 2023 due to his affairs, physical abuse, and lack of support for her media career. Finally, Pori Moni divorced him on 18 September 2023.

== Filmography ==
=== Films ===
Key
†	Denotes films that have not yet been released

Year	Film	Role	Notes	Ref.
2016	Ice Cream	Nadim	Debut film	
2019	No Dorai	Sohel		
2021	Networker Baire	Abir	Released on Chorki	
2022	Gunin	Romij		
2022	Poran	Roman		
2022	Hawa	Ibrahim		
2022	Damal	Munna		
2023	Roktojoba		Released on iScreen	
2024	Kajolrekha	Such Kumar		
2024	Deyaler Desh	Boishak		
2024	Omar	Omar / Baker		
2025	Insaaf	Yusuf / Lavu Master		
2026	Bonolota Express	Dr. Ashhab	Based on Humayun Ahmed's novel 'Kichukkhon'	
2026	Jibon Opera †	Rafiq	Announced	
2027	Kanabhula Paradox †	TBA	Filming	
TBA	Kobi †	TBA	Delayed	

=== Web series ===
Year	Title	Role	Notes	Ref.
2020	Mainkar Chipay	Samir	Short film on ZEE5	
2020	Infinity	Agent Murad	Web series on Binge	
2021	Bilaap	SI Rahat	Web series on Cinematic	
2023	Infinity 2	Agent Murad	Web series on Binge	

== Awards and nominations ==
Year	Award	Category	Work	Result	Ref.
2018	BFDA Awards	Best Film Actor	Poran	Won	
2024	Bangladesh Excellence Awards	Best Film Actor	Deyaler Desh	Won	
2026	BIFA Awards	Best Actor	Bonolota Express	Won	
