= Rezaur Rahman =

Bangladeshi-born Canadian lawyer and celebrity

Rezaur Rahman is a Bangladeshi-born Canadian lawyer and celebrity through hosting a TV show aired on Bangladesh Television (BTV) in the 1980s called Ain Adalat (Bangla: আইন আদালত).

== Biography ==
Rahman is a Bangladeshi human rights activist, known for the television program Ain Adalat (Law and Court 1983–87). Beginning as a lawyer, he tackled injustices and raised the profile of human rights.

Canadian media have featured him, and the National Film Board of Canada centred on him in the documentary The Asylum. He was named in the Who's Who of the World, 1994-1995 edition.

He gives free legal advice to clients of the Catholic Immigration Centre and the Lebanese Arab Social Services in Ottawa, Canada. Rahman contributes to community newspaper, magazine and blog and speaks at organizations and groups on the subject of Canadian Citizenship and Immigration law.

Rahman is a graduate of law from McGill University, Canada, and Dhaka University, Bangladesh.

He lives in Ottawa, with his wife and two children.
