= Swapnajaal =

Bangladeshi romantic drama film

- Swapnajaal Poster
- Bengali: স্বপ্নজাল
- Directed by: Giasuddin Selim
- Screenplay by: Giasuddin Selim
- Produced by: Abul Khayer
- Starring: Pori Moni; Yash Rohan; Fazlur Rahman Babu; Misha Sawdagar; Shahidul Alam Sachchu
- Cinematography: Kamrul Hasan Khosru
- Edited by: Iqbal Ahsanul Kabir
- Music by: Rasheed Shorif Shoiab
- Production company: Bengal Creations
- Release date: 6 April 2018
- Running time: 146 minutes
- Country: Bangladesh
- Language: Bengali

Swapnajaal is a 2018 Bangladeshi Bengali-language romantic drama film written and directed by Giasuddin Selim. It is stars Pori Moni and Yash Rohan in as lead role

== Cast ==
- Yash Rohan as Apu
- Pori Moni as Shuvra
- Fazlur Rahman Babu as Aynal Gazi
- Misha Sawdagar as Hiran Saha
- Shahidul Alam Sachchu as Rahman Miah
- Munia Islam as Julekha
- Iresh Zaker as Thandu
- Naresh Bhuiyan
- Shilpi Sharkar Apu

== Music ==
=== Playback singer ===
- Luva Nabid Chowdhury
- Kazi Krishnokoli Islam
- Laisa Ahmed Lisa
