= Murder of Rifat Sharif =

2019 murder in Bangladesh

The murder of Rifat Sharif occurred in Barguna town in Bangladesh on 26 June 2019. The murder investigation and the subsequent trial received blanket coverage in the press.

== Incident ==
On June 26, 2019, Sabbir Hossain Nayan alias Nayan Bond and Rifat Farazi, along with some others, attacked 25-year-old Rifat Sharif, an internet service provider, with sharp weapons in front of Barguna Government College in front of his wife Aysha Siddika Minni. A video clip of the attack, probably captured on a mobile phone, went viral on social media. His wife Ayesha pretended to save her husband from the attackers. Police later found out after investigation that the wife, Ayesha, is the mastermind behind the barbaric killing. Fatally injured Rifat was taken to Barishal Sher-E-Bangla Medical College Hospital (BSMCH) where doctors declared him dead.

== Chronology ==
- 26 June 2019: Rifat Sharif murdered
- 2 July 2019: Main accused Sabbir Hossain Nayan alias Nayan Bond was killed in crossfire
- 3 July 2019: Another key accused Rifat Farazi arrested
- 16 July 2019: Rifat Sharif's wife Ayesha Siddika Minni arrested
- 18 July: Minni confessed her part in the murder
- 1 September 2019: Police placed charge against Minni, and 23 others for their alleged involvement in the murder

== Trial ==
On 27 June 2019, Rifat's father Dulal Sharif filed a murder case accusing 12 persons. Police placed charge against Minni, and 23 others for their alleged involvement in the murder on 1 September 2019. The submitted charge sheet was divided into two segments, one for the 14 juveniles accused, and the other for the 10 adults accused. A total of 76 witnesses testified against the 10 accused in the court. The court indicted the 10 adult accused, including Minni, in the case on 1 January 2020. The trial of 14 minors accused in the murder case was started on 12 January 2020. The accused in the case asked why Summan Debnath, son of Awami League Member of Parliament Dhirendra Debnath Shambhu, was not an accused as they were following his instructions.

District and Sessions Judge of Barguna sentenced six accused including Ayesha Siddika Minni to death in Rifat Sharif murder case on 30 September 2020. The court also acquitted four other accused in the verdict.
