= Giasuddin Selim =

Bangladeshi film director and screenwriter

Gias Uddin Selim
- গিয়াস উদ্দিন সেলিম
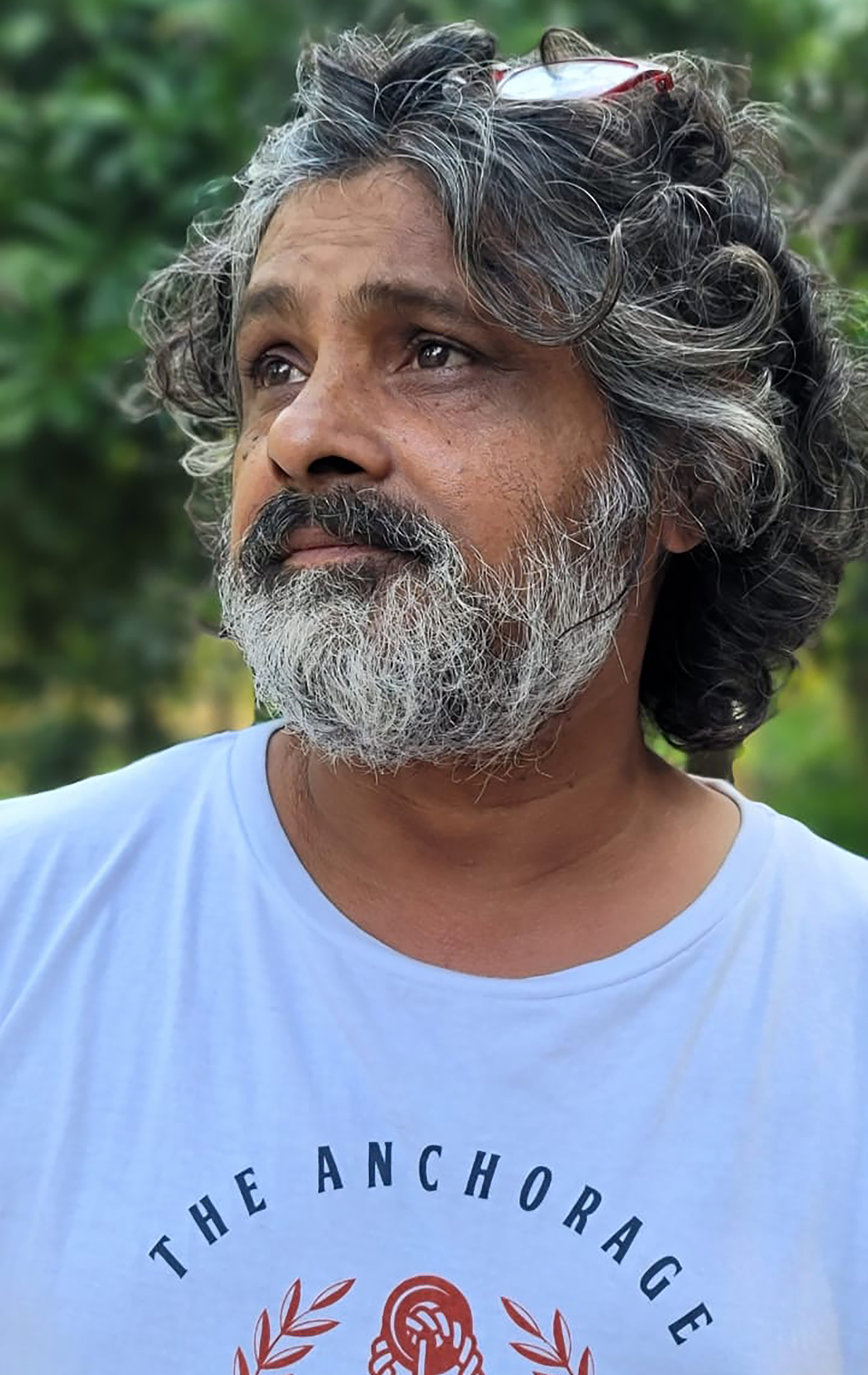
- Gias Uddim Selim in 2021
- Born: Feni, Bangladesh
- Education: University of Rajshahi
- Occupations: Film director, screenwriter
- Awards: Bangladesh National Film Award, (2003) and (2008)

Giasuddin Selim is a Bangladeshi film director and screenwriter. He is best known for directing Monpura (2009) and Swapnajaal (2018). He won Bangladesh National Film Award twice: Best Story for the film Adhiar (2003) in 2003 and Best Screenplay for Monpura in 2008. His recent film is Kajolrekha (2024).

== Early life ==
Selim was born and raised in Feni District. He studied at University of Rajshahi in the marketing department He is an establishment member of 'Bishwabidyalay theatre Rajshahi' at Rajshahi University.

== Career ==
Selim started his career as a scriptwriter. Later he moved on to directing television dramas. His first directed television drama serial was Biprotip. His debut full-length feature film was Monpura, released in 2009.

== Bengal Cinema ==
Gias Uddin Selim is the founder of Bangal Cinema, a film productions. This group of young film makers used to be Selim's assistant directors.

- Yeamin Muzumder - 1st Assistant Director & Casting Director
- Turan Munshi - Line Producer & Production Manager
- Samiun Jahan Dola - Costume Designer
- Forhad Reza Milon - Make up Artist
- Rubama Fairuzz - Make up Artist
- Rohit Shayon - BTS(Behind the scene) Photographer & Cinematographer

== Filmography ==
Key
†	Denotes films that have not yet been released

Year	Film	Director	Writer	Notes	Ref.
2003	Adhiar	No	Yes	Won – National Film Awards for Best Storywriter	
2009	Monpura	Yes	Yes	Won – National Film Awards for Best Screenplay	
2018	Swapnajaal	Yes	Yes		
2022	Gunin	Yes	Yes		
2022	Paap Punno	Yes	Yes		
2024	Kajolrekha	Yes	Yes	Got limelight selection at International Film Festival Rotterdam	
2026	Separation †	Yes	Yes	Filming	
