= Chorki =

Bangladeshi content platform and production company

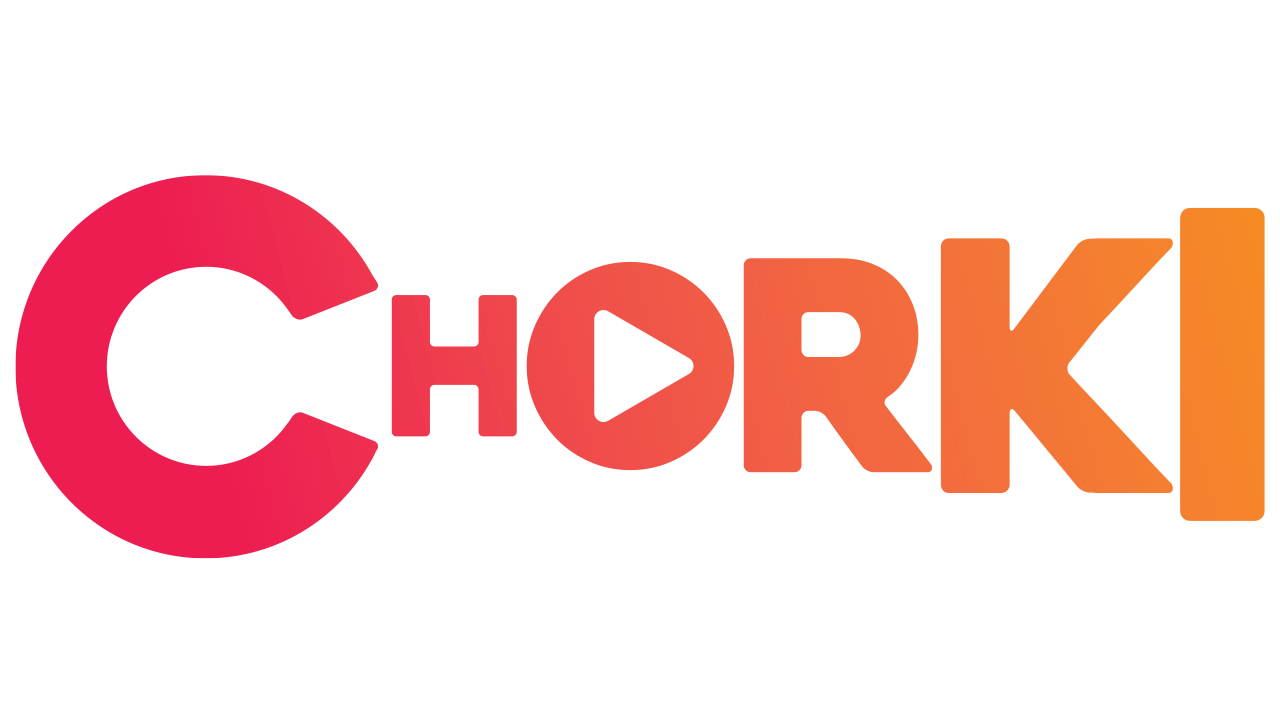
- Company type: Subsidiary
- Website type: OTT video streaming platform
- Available in: Bangla
- Headquarters: 19, Karwan Bazar, Dhaka, Bangladesh
- Country of origin: Bangladesh
- Area served: Worldwide
- Owner: Transcom Group
- Key people: Redoan Rony (CEO),
- Industry: Entertainment, mass media
- Products: Streaming media; Video on demand; Digital distribution
- Services: Film production; Film distribution; Television production; Television distribution
- Employees: 11-50
- Parent: Prothom Alo (Mediastar Ltd.)
- Website: chorki.net
- Registration: Required
- Users: 1 million (As of 2023)
- Launched: 12 July 2021; 5 years ago
- Current status: Active

Chorki is a Bangladeshi subscription-based over-the-top media service owned by Transcom Group via Prothom Alo subsidiary of Mediastar Limited, and it was launched on 12 July 2021. The service shows original content and content from other providers, including television series, films, and documentaries. The service is available in an ad-free version with limited content, while the premium tier includes a larger content library including original shows and films.

== History ==
Mediastar Ltd. in 2020 to launch an OTT platform and named it Chorki. Film maker Redoan Rony is the CEO of Chorki In April 2021, Indian High Commission of Dhaka shares 38 documentary films with Chorki. On 12 July 2021, a launching ceremony was held on online due to the lockdown of the COVID-19 pandemic and Chorki started its journey with a motto - Film, Fun, Foorti. Jaya Ahsan and many more stars joined in online in this opening ceremony. Chorki is currently available for Android, iOS, Apple TV, Amazon Fire TV, Android TV, Samsung Smart TV. Chorki won the Best Digital Diversification Project award at the Bangladesh Media Innovation Awards 2022 held in September 2022. On October 4, 2023, Chorki enters India.

== Content ==
Chorki mainly focuses on Bangla language content. They also show Turkish and Iranian films with Bangla dubbed version. It has two categories of contents premium and free respectively. To watch premium content subscription is required for a wide variety of video content such as movies, series, Shows, non-fiction Content, Music Video, Chorki Original content, and many more Bangla and foreign language video contents. They started their journey with over 200 titles of films, TV series, documentaries, TV dramas, etc.

== Technology partner ==
Chorki has partnered with leading global streaming and OTT solution provider, ViewLift to power its on-demand video streaming service. Chorki platform uses AVOD, SVOD and TVOD models to monetize its content.

== Legal proceedings ==
In June 2026, the United States District Court for the Southern District of New York issued a contempt order against Mediastar Limited after finding that it had violated a previously issued preliminary injunction. The court ordered the transfer of the chorki.com domain name to the plaintiffs' counsel and directed Google and Apple to remove the Chorki mobile applications from their respective app stores.

== Original programming ==
=== Feature films ===
Key
†	Denotes films that have not yet been released

List of Distributor and Produced films by Chorki
Year	Films	Director	Notes	Ref.
2022	Gunin	Giasuddin Selim		
2023	Surongo	Raihan Rafi	Co-produced with Alpha-i	
2024	Peyarar Subash	Nurul Alam Atique	Co-produced with Alpha-i	
2024	Toofan	Raihan Rafi	Co-produced with Alpha-i and SVF	
2025	Daagi	Shihab Shaheen	Co-produced with Alpha-i and SVF	
2025	Utshob	Tanim Noor	Distributor & co-produced with DOPE Productions	
2025	Taandob	Raihan Rafi	Co-produced with Alpha-i and SVF	
2026	Domm: Until The Last Breath	Redoan Rony	Co-produced with Alpha-i and SVF	

=== Web films ===
Key
†	Denotes films that have not yet been released

- All films are produced by Chorki and films which are only distributor noted.

Year	Title	Director	Notes	Ref.
2021	Youtumor	Adnan Al Rajeev		
2021	Networker Baire	Mizanur Rahman Aryan		
2021	Munshigiri	Amitabh Reza Chowdhury		
2021	Khachar Bhitor Ochin Pakhi	Raihan Rafi		
2021	72 Ghanta	Atanu Ghosh	Distributor; Indian Bengali film	
2022	Taan	Raihan Rafi		
2022	Redrum	Vicky Zahed		
2022	Floor Number 7	Raihan Rafi	Distributor	
2022	Shahosh	Sazzad Khan		
2022	Ei Muhurte	Piplu R Khan, Mejbaur Rahman Sumon and Abrar Athar		
2022	Shuklopokkho	Vicky Zahed		
2022	Nishwas	Raihan Rafi		
2022	Dui Diner Duniya	Anam Biswas		
2022	Daag	Sanjoy Somadder		
2022	Cafe Desire	Robiul Alam Robi		
2023	Unish 20	Mizanur Rahman Aryan	Co-produced with Alpha-i	
2023	Antonagar	Goutam Koiri		
2023	Patalghar	Noor Imran Mithu		
2023	Punormilone	Mizanur Rahman Aryan		
2023	Something Like An Autobiography	Mostofa Sarwar Farooki		
2024	36 24 36	Rezaur Rahman		
2026	Faisha Gesi	Mahmudur Rahman Hime	Co-produced with Alpha-i	

=== Series ===
Year	Title	Director	Notes	Ref.
2021	Morichika	Shihab Shaheen		
2021	Unoloukik	Robiul Alam Robi		
2021	Jaago Bahey	Siddiq Ahmed, Saleh Sobhan Auneem and Sukorno Shahed Dhiman		
2022	Shaaticup	Mohammad Touqir Islam		
2022	Nikhoj	Reehan Rahman		
2022	Pett Kata Shaw	Nuhash Humayun		
2022	Syndicate	Shihab Shaheen		
2022	Jodi Ami Beche Firi	Tanim Parvez		
2023	Internsheep	Rezaur Rahman		
2023	Myself Allen Swapan	Shihab Shaheen		
2023	Overtrump	Bashar Georgis		
2023	Mercules	Abu Shahed Emon		
2023	Virus	Anam Biswas		
2023	Procholito	Md. Abid Mallick		
2024	Sinpaat	Mohammad Touqir Islam		
2024	Tikit	Vicky Zahed		
2024	Feu	Sukorno Sahed Dhiman		
2025	Gulmohor	Syed Ahmed Shawki	Won – Meril-Prothom Alo Awards for Best Web Series	
2026	Cactus	Shihab Shaheen		

=== Comedy ===
Year	Title	Genre	Seasons	Runtime	Notes	Ref.
2021	Sugar Free	Comedy	4 episodes	20–30 min.	Miniseries	

=== Documentaries ===
Title	Subject	Release date	Runtime
Neel Mukut	Bangladesh UN Peacekeeping Force	8 August 2021	1 hour, 20 min.
Adhkhana Bhalo Chele Adha Mostaan	Shayan Chowdhury Arnob	23 September 2021	1 hour, 10 min.
Ghur Ghur Ghurni With Shehwar & Maria	Travel Vlog by Shehwar & Maria	25 April 2022	6 Episodes (15-16 min.)
Amir Hannan's One Night Stand	Stand Up Comedy Special	21 July 2023	49 mins

=== TV Shorts ===
Year	Title	Director	Notes	Genre	Premiere	Ref.
2021	Lal Katan Nil Dakat	Vicky Zahed	TV shorts	Drama	12 July 2021	
2021	Joar Bhata	Sumon Anowar	TV shorts	Drama	26 August 2021	
2021	Otithi	Farhad Shahi	TV shorts	Drama	9 September 2021	
2021	Bagher Baccha	Gautam Koiri	TV shorts	Drama	16 September 2021	
2021	Tithir Oshukh	Imraul Rafat	TV shorts	Psychological thriller	4 November 2021	
2021	Bokulful	Saraf Ahmed Zibon	TV shorts	Drama	3 December 2021	
2022	Ekjon Telapoka	Golam Muntakim	TV shorts	Drama	6 January 2022	
2022	Prem Puran	Zahid Gogon	TV shorts	Drama	10 February 2022	
2022	Scooty	Arifur Rahman	TV shorts	Drama	8 March 2022	
2022	Shesh Chithi	Sumon Dhar	TV shorts	Drama	2 June 2022	
2022	Tonoya	Imraul Rafat	TV shorts	Drama	21 July 2022	
2022	Araal	Nazmul Robin	TV shorts	Psychological thriller	27 October 2022	
2023	Jahan	Atiq Zaman	TV shorts	Psychological thriller	26 January 2023	

== Exclusive programming ==
=== Foreign films ===
Film	Country	Language
Newcastle	Iran	Persian
Exodus	Iran	Persian
Once Upon a Time in Anatolia	Turkey	Turkish
Topoli	Iran	Bangla dub
Labyrinth	Iran	Bangla dub
Miracle in Cell No. 7	Turkey	Bangla dub
Boarding Pass	Iran	Bangla dub
Travel Mates	Turkey	Bangla dub
Dance with Me	Iran	Bangla dub
Luca	India	Bangla dub
Sour Apples	Turkey	Bangla dub
Pig Gene	Iran	Bangla dub
Zero Floor	Iran	Bangla dub
Highlight	Iran	Bangla dub
Kingslayer	Iran	Bangla dub
Life Again	Iran	Bangla dub
Whisper If I Forget	Turkey	Bangla dub
The Home	Iran	Bangla dub
Bandhobi	South Korea	Bangla dub
Theeran Adhigaaram Ondru	India	Bangla dub
Maanagaram	India	Bangla dub
Travel Mates 2	Turkey	Bangla dub

=== Foreign series ===
Film	Country	Language
Weightlifting Fairy Kim Bok-joo	South Korea	Bangla dubbed
I'm Not a Robot	South Korea	Bangla dubbed
The Red Sleeve	South Korea	Bangla dubbed
Extraordinary You	South Korea	Bangla dubbed
Kill Me Heal Me	South Korea	Bangla dubbed

== See also ==
- List of Bangladeshi OTT platforms
