= Shaan (2022 film) =

2022 Bangladeshi film

- First look poster
- Directed by: M. Raahim
- Screenplay by: Nazim Ud Daula
- Story by: Azad Khan
- Produced by: Quick Multimedia; Atikur Rahman
- Starring: Siam Ahmed; Puja Cherry; Champa; Aruna Biswas; Rihan Al Jubaier
- Cinematography: Saiful Shaheen
- Music by: Ahmmed Humayun
- Distributed by: Jaaz Multimedia(Bangladesh) T-Series Films (India)
- Release date: 3 May 2022
- Running time: 2 hours 30 minutes
- Country: Bangladesh
- Language: Bangla
- Budget: ৳4 Crore
- Box office: ৳2.65 crore (US$220,000)

Shaan (Bengali: শান) is a 2022 Bangladeshi action thriller film based on a true story. The film stars Siam Ahmed, Puja Cherry Roy, Champa, Taskeen Rahman & Aruna Biswas. It was director M. Raahim's debut film, who was assistant director of Siam Ahmed's first two films Poramon 2 & Dahan. With this film, Champa & Aruna Biswas collaborated after 26 years. The screenplay of the film was written by reputed thriller writer Nazim Ud Daula, based on the story of Mr. Azad Khan, with art direction by Tareq Bablu.

The film was produced by Quick Multimedia & distributed by Jaaz Multimedia.

The film was released on May 3, 2022; after being postponed multiple times due to the COVID-19 pandemic.

== Plot ==
In Bangladesh, senior police officer Aasa Chaudhry is assigned to tackle the country's human trafficking problem. He leads his police force in numerous successful operations that result in the arrest of many traffickers and the rescue of numerous victims. His investigation reveals that Vasco Group, the country's largest human trafficking syndicate, is active in Bangladesh. However, he lacks sufficient information to identify the group's members and network.

Vasco Group has assassinated many individuals who posed a threat to its operations, including police officers and whistleblowers. Their attempt to assassinate Chaudhry fails when officer Shaan saves him and captures an assassin named Milan alive. While in police custody, Milan provides little useful information, as Vasco Group keeps sensitive details highly confidential, even from its own members. Milan is later assassinated while being transferred to another police station.

During another operation, Shaan saves the life of a singer named Rhea. Rhea later falls in love with Shaan and Shaan reciprocates her feelings. Meanwhile, Rhea's mother is diagnosed with cancer and requires expensive treatment that the family cannot afford. Suman, a friend of Rhea's late father, owes the family a large sum of money but refuses to repay it despite having the means to do so. He even threatens Rhea. With Shaan's help, Rhea successfully recovers the debt from Suman. To the unbeknownst of Shaan and Rhea, Suman actually works for Vasco Group.

A victim who escaped from Vasco Group is later questioned by Chaudhry. The victim reveals that Vasco Group harvests organs from trafficked people and that its leader is known as David. Before Chaudhry can share this information with his department, he is assassinated on his way back. The weapon used is the same one used in Milan's assassination, leading the police to conclude that Vasco Group is behind both murders.

While investigating Chaudhry's murder, Shaan is devastated to learn that Rhea and her mother have been brutally murdered in their home. Moteen, Rhea's friend who also lives there, is missing. Shaan later finds evidence suggesting that Moteen attempted to follow the killers but was likely discovered and killed by them. Suspecting Suman's involvement, Shaan attempts to arrest him. However, an assassin kills Suman in the presence of Shaan's team and escapes. The murder weapon is the same one used in the killings of Milan and Chaudhry. Shaan realizes that the murders of Rhea, her mother, and Suman are connected to Vasco Group.

Shaan analyzes Suman's phone records and discovers an unknown number. He traces it to a man named Farooq and approaches him. Upon seeing the police, Farooq takes a woman hostage and attempts to flee, but is eventually captured. Farooq reveals that he works for Vasco Group, which traffics people across borders and harvests their organs. Although he claims not to know David's identity, he provides information about a contact who arranges the transportation of victims across the border.

Shaan reports this information to his superior, who refuses to authorize further operations because the organ-harvesting activities take place outside Bangladesh. Determined to continue the investigation, Shaan and three fellow officers proceed unofficially. They pose as people seeking employment abroad and approach the trafficker identified by Farooq. The trafficker agrees to help them travel overseas.

The trafficker secretly smuggles them across the border and places them in a rural compound guarded by armed men, claiming that it is only a temporary camp and that others will soon arrive to take them to their destination. During the night, Shaan's team sneaks out of their room and explores the compound, discovering that it is actually Vasco Group's organ-harvesting facility.

The following day, Shaan's team attempts to rescue the victims held there, but the mission fails because David has already been monitoring them. The team is captured. David is revealed to be Moteen. He explains that Rhea and her mother accidentally discovered his true identity, forcing him to kill them. He then staged evidence to make the police believe that he had also been killed.

David decides to kill Shaan and harvest his organs the following day. However, Shaan manages to free himself the next morning and releases the rest of his team. During a shootout, Shaan's team kills the armed guards and arrests David. They subsequently take him back to Bangladesh to stand trial.

== Cast ==
- Siam Ahmed as AC Shaan
- Puja Cherry as Riya
- Misha Sawdagor
- Taskeen Rahman
- Champa as Shaan's mother
- Aruna Biswas as Riya's mother
- Nader Chowdhury as Dr.Asad Chowdhury
- Syed Hasan Imam
- Monuwar Hussain as Aadi
- Amjad Hossen as Police Officer
- Abu Jahid Bhuyan as Police Officer
- Imam Hossain Saju
- Arafat Hassan Sohan as Police Officer
- Al Yasaha Naim as Al Yasaha
- Israt Punam as Rose

== Reception ==
=== Box office ===
Shaan Grossed About of above ৳2 Crore In the domestic box office. Later it was released in Malaysia, Australia, France & USA theaters. Gaining $1,475 On opening and overall of $3,114 box office in International Box office. Making The Movie to Grossed about 2.65-3.0 crore in the box office collection. However the movie was claimed as a flop because of the production budget of it was ৳4 crore
