= Nazim Ud Daula =

Bangladeshi writer

- নাজিম উদ দৌলা
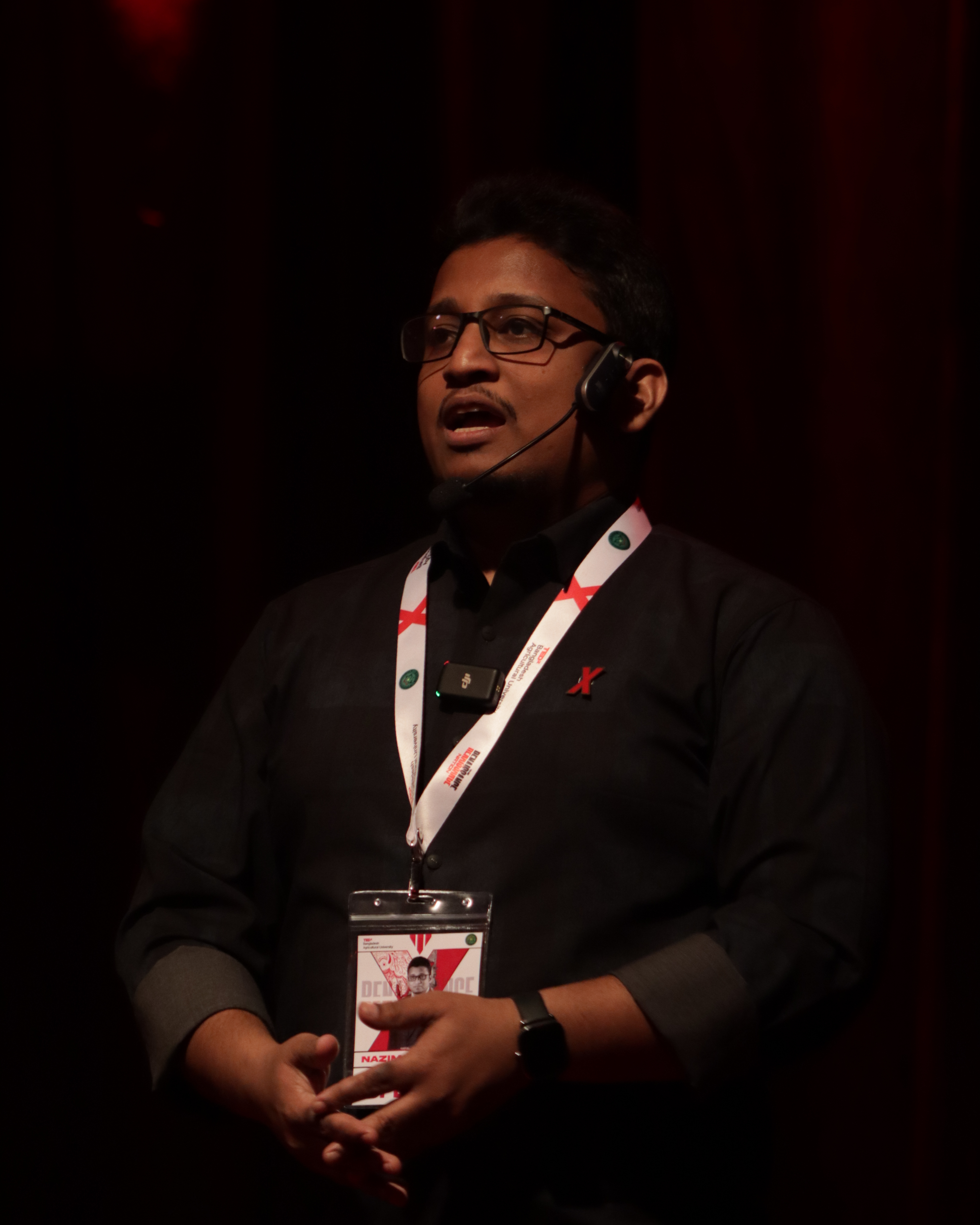
- Daula in 2025
- Born: Syed Nazim Ud Daula; 4 November 1990 (age 35)
- Citizenship: Bangladesh
- Education: MBA in Marketing
- Alma mater: University of Dhaka
- Occupation: Novelist
- Known for: Screenwriting
- Children: 1
- Awards: National Film Award (2023)

Syed Nazim Ud Daula (better known as Nazim Ud Daula) is a Bangladeshi author, screenwriter, and former corporate professional. He is known for writing modern thriller and action-oriented books, films, and web series screenplays in Bangladesh. He has penned the screenplay and dialogues for commercially successful and widely discussed films such as Surongo (2023), Damal (2022), Shaan (2022), and Operation Sundarbans (2022). In 2025, due to professional dissatisfaction and payment-related complications, he announced his retirement from professional screenwriting. He jointly won the National Film Award for Best Story with Raihan Rafi in 2026 for the film Surongo. Currently, he is focused on writing literature.

== Early life and education ==
Nazim Ud Daula completed his Bachelor of Business Administration (BBA) and Master of Business Administration (MBA) in Marketing from the University of Dhaka. After finishing his education, he briefly taught as a lecturer at a private university in 2016. However, lacking interest in teaching, he later joined the corporate sector and engaged in creative work.

== Career ==
=== Literary career ===
Nazim Ud Daula has been practicing writing since his teenage years. Initially, he wrote on various blog sites and Facebook. In 2012, his first story, 'Kobi' (Poet), was published in the 'Kalantor Sahitya Samayiki' (Kalantor Literary Magazine). While studying at the University of Dhaka, his first thriller novel, Incarnation, was published at the 2015 Ekushey Book Fair. In August of the same year, his second novel, a historical thriller titled Bloodstone, was published. These two books brought him immense popularity among readers during his student life. By 2019, he had published five books. His notable literary works include Mohajatra, Mithya Tumi Dosh Pipra, Scarlet, Bridge Rokkhok, Sotyer Moto Bodmash, and the Detective Mansur series books Prohelika, Kuhelika, and Jobonika.

=== Corporate and advertising world ===
After completing his studies, he briefly worked as a lecturer at a private university. However, driven by his interest in creative work, he left teaching and entered the advertising industry. From 2017 to 2018, he served as a Project Manager at an agency named 'Geeky Social'. He subsequently joined the digital marketing agency 'Analyzen Bangladesh Limited', where he worked for four years. In November 2022, he resigned from his position as 'Creative Supervisor' at Analyzen. During his time there, he used the pseudonym 'Masud Rana'. Later, he also worked as a Creative Manager at the production company 'Alpha-i'. Working in advertising agencies for a long time helped him acquire the technical skills of storytelling and screenwriting.

=== Screenwriting and films ===
In 2018, after reading his book Mohajatra, Abdul Aziz, the head of Jaaz Multimedia, found the vibe of 'Masud Rana' in his writing style. Consequently, he offered Nazim to write the screenplay for the film MR-9: Do or Die (2023). This was his first project as a screenwriter. To prepare, he completed a two-month virtual screenwriting course from an institution in Hollywood. He prepared about 16 drafts of the film's screenplay and showed them to the original author, Qazi Anwar Hussain, who highly praised the script. However, Nazim noted that due to technical complications and foreign locations, the film's shooting could not fully follow his original screenplay.

Although his career began with a film screenwriting offer, his formal journey started through the small screen. In 2018, Vicky Zahed directed the short film Aaj Amar Pala based on his story. He also wrote the screenplay for Vicky Zahed's drama Lovers Food Van. In 2021, Nazim wrote the screenplays for two fiction episodes, Akash Bhora Tara and Ek Bhai Champa, from the 'Shortcut' series directed by Shafayet Mansoor Rana for the OTT platform Bioscope. He also worked on Sanjay Samaddar's web fiction Lohar Tori. His other notable web contents include The Dark Side of Dhaka, Khachar Bhitor Ochin Pakhi, Buker Moddhye Agun, Shuklopokkho, and The Silence.

His feature film debut was the 2022 film Shaan, directed by M. Raahim. This was his first screenplay to be released on the big screen. Following this, he wrote the screenplays for Dipankar Dipon's Operation Sundarbans (2022) and Raihan Rafi's Damal (2022). Regarding Damal, he mentioned that due to technical limitations, his screenplay could not be entirely translated onto the screen.

Nazim Ud Daula's screenwriting philosophy involves blending commercial and artistic elements in films. Even when considering the Censor Board, controversial topics, or the political situation, he generally structures the story in his own way first and later modifies it according to the director's and producer's demands. He has frequently collaborated with directors like Raihan Rafi, Sunny Sanwar, and Dipankar Dipon. He claims that about 95 percent of his screenplay was faithfully portrayed on screen in Raihan Rafi's Surongo (2023). During the scripting of Surongo, he regularly visited the shooting spot and instantly planned and wrote the scenes inside the tunnel while sitting on the set. He even injured his leg once during the filming of this movie.

His final works as a professional screenwriter include Insaaf (2025) and NeelChokro (2025).

==== Retirement announcement and controversy ====
On 18 September 2025, Nazim Ud Daula announced on social media that he would no longer work as a professional screenwriter. He alleged that the Bangladeshi entertainment industry does not give writers the respect, credit, and proper remuneration they deserve. Out of frustration over unpaid dues and lack of proper evaluation of his work, he expressed regret over turning from a "creative writer" into a "commissioned writer".

Currently, he is focusing entirely on writing original literature. Even after receiving the National Film Award in 2026, he told the media that he would not return to professional screenwriting.

== Personal life ==
Nazim Ud Daula is married and has one child. After taking a break from writing for the screen, he is currently running his own startup business.

== Notable works ==
=== Films ===
Year	Title	Role	Director	Notes	Ref.
2022	Shaan	Screenplay	M. Raahim		
2022	Operation Sundarbans	Screenplay	Dipankar Dipon		
2022	Damal	Screenplay	Raihan Rafi		
2023	Surongo	Screenplay	Raihan Rafi	Won –Bangladesh National Film Award for Best Screenplay Writer; wroted the screenplay jointly with Raihan Rafi	
2023	MR-9: Do or Die	Screenplay	Asif Akbar	Bangladesh–US joint production	
2025	NeelChokro	Story and Screenplay	Mithu Khan		
2025	Insaaf: Tale of Legends	Story and Screenplay	Sanjay Samaddar		

=== Web series ===
Year	Title	Role	Director	OTT Platform
2023	The Silence	Screenplay	Vicky Zahed	Binge
2023	Buker Moddhye Agun	Screenplay	Taneem Rahman Angshu	Hoichoi
2024	Tikit	Screenplay	Vicky Zahed	Chorki
2025	AKA	Story	Vicky Zahed	Hoichoi

=== Web films ===
Year	Title	Role	OTT Platform
2021	Lohar Tori	Story and Screenplay	iTheater
2021	The Dark Side of Dhaka	Screenplay	iTheater
2022	Khachar Bhitor Ochin Pakhi	Screenplay	Chorki
2022	Chompa House	Story	iScreen
2022	Shuklopokkho	Screenplay	Chorki
2023	Opolap	Story and Screenplay	Deepto Play
2024	Criminals	Story and Screenplay	Deepto Play

=== Dramas and short films ===
Title	Role	Broadcast/Platform
Aaj Amar Pala	Story	Dhruba TV
Anti Hero	Story and Screenplay	RTV
Lovers Food Van	Screenplay	Brikkho Films
10 Minute	Story and Screenplay	Asian TV
Love Scout	Story and Screenplay	Banglavision
Love Trap	Story and Screenplay	Banglavision
Hishebi Bou	Screenplay	G-Series
Ek Bhai Champa	Story	Bioscope
Akash Bhora Tara	Story	Bioscope
Proxy	Story and Screenplay	Bioscope
Lal Katan Nil Dakat	Story	Chorki
Best Friend's Boyfriend	Screenplay	RTV
Office Juddho	Story and Screenplay	RTV
Rashifol	Story and Screenplay	Gangchil
Gerakol	Story	Chorki
Ondho Balok	Story and Screenplay	Chorki

=== Bibliography ===
==== Novels ====
- Incarnation (2014, Adee Prokashon)
- Bloodstone (2015, Adee Prokashon)
- Scarlet (2016, Adee Prokashon)
- Bridge Rokkhok (2017, Adee Prokashon)
- Mohajatra (2018, Rodela Publications)
- Mithya Tumi Dosh Pipra (2020, Adee Prokashon)
- Fatol (2026, Boi Angon Publications)

==== Novellas ====
- Prohelika (2021, Premium Publications)
- Kuhelika (2024, Premium Publications)
- Jabonika (2025, Premium Publications)

==== Story Collections ====
- Chompa House (2022, Premium Publications)
- Omoretter Prottasha Nei (2023, Adee Prokashon)
- Shotter Moto Bodmash (2024, Grantha Kutir)

== Awards and honors ==
Year	Awards	Category	Work	Results	Ref.
2026	National Film Award	Best Screenplay writer (jointly with Raihan Rafi)	Surongo	Won	
