= August 1975 (film) =

Bangladeshi political drama film

- Bengali: আগস্ট ১৯৭৫
- Directed by: Selim Khan; Shamim Ahamed Roni
- Written by: Shamim Ahamed Roni
- Produced by: Selim Khan; Afsaruddin Bhuiyan; Kazi Mizanur Rahman; Nasir Uddin
- Starring: Anisur Rahman Milon; Tauquir Ahmed; Shahiduzzaman Selim; Taskeen Rahman; Masuma Rahman Nabila
- Cinematography: Saiful Islam Shahin
- Edited by: Mostafa Prakash
- Music by: Emon Saha; Suman Kalyan
- Production company: Shapla Media International
- Distributed by: Cinebaj
- Release date: 15 August 2021
- Running time: 100 minute
- Country: Bangladesh
- Language: Bangla

August 1975 is a 2021 Bangladeshi political drama film based on the immediate aftermath of the assassination of Sheikh Mujibur Rahman. The film is produced by Selim Khan whose production company operates as Shapla Media International Ltd. Afsaruddin Bhuiyan, Kazi Mizanur Rahman and Nasuir Uddin also join the film as executive producers. Selim Khan directed the movie alongside Shamim Ahamed Roni. Masuma Rahman Nabila, Tauquir Ahmed and Shahiduzzaman Selim have been cast in various leading roles. The film portrays history of the killing of Rahman on 15 August, till his burial on 16 August. Principal photography of this film begun on 10 July and ended on 29 July 2020. The film was released on Cinebaj on 15 August 2021, the National Mourning Day in Bangladesh.

== Plot ==
The film portrays the initial events of the radical change in the political situation of Bangladesh after the assassination of Bangabandhu Sheikh Mujibur Rahman and his family on 15 August 1975. The film highlights the political crisis made upon the killing and fate of four founding members of the Awami League, the first Prime Minister of Bangladesh Tajuddin Ahmed, former Prime Minister Mansur Ali, former Vice President Syed Nazrul Islam and former Home Minister AHM Kamaruzzaman after the assassination.

== Cast ==
- Anisur Rahman Milon - A police officer.
- Tauquir Ahmed - Tajuddin Ahmad, one of four founding member of Bangladesh Awami League.
- Taskeen Rahman - Colonel Kazi Haider, who was assigned to bury Rahman's body at his village home.
- Masuma Rahman Nabila - Baby Moudud, former Bangladeshi politician, writer and journalist, close ally of Sheikh Hasina.
- Shahiduzzaman Selim - Khondaker Moshtaq Ahmed, who served as the president of Bangladesh unofficially, just after the assassination of Sheikh Mujibur Rahman.
- Ashraful Ashish - Ziaur Rahman, Contemporary Deputy Chief of Army staff.

Ensemble cast also includes Arman Parvez Murad, Jayanta Chattopadyay, Dilara Zaman, Tanvin Sweety in some notable roles in this film.

== Production ==
The film was scripted by the working title, 1975 – An Untold Story. The story is based on the events after assassination of Bangabandhu, therefore non of his family members is not included in screenplay. The title later changed to August 1975 before releasing official poster and teaser.

Tauqir, Nabila and Selim's name surfaced as the cast members after the shooting has begun for ten days. Shapla Media also offered significant roles for Purnima and Fazlur Rahman Babu, both of them denied. Babu later lend his voice for a song used in this film. Taskeen Rahman, Jayanta Chattopadhyay, Dilara Zaman, Tanvin Sweety, Maznun Mizan and rest of the cast has been shown in teaser confirming their castings.

August 1975 was filmed within a 14-day schedule. The film was secretly shot at Bangladesh Film Development Corporation from 10 July 2020 and finished shooting on 29 July 2020. A new period set has been built for entire principal photography. Bappa Mazumder has recorded a song named 'Prahashan' for the film, composed by Emon Saha. Another song named "Mujib" is composed by Suman Kalyan and sung by Fazlur Rahman Babu. Sudip Kuman Dip penned "Mujib" based on the notable events from the life of Rahman.

== Release ==
August 1975 was initially scheduled to release on 15 August 2020 to coincide with the national day of mourning for Rahman. However, the film was postponed due to the COVID-19 pandemic in Bangladesh. The filmmakers have indicated the film will seek a theatrical release. Due to Coronavirus, the film released on the app Cinebaj on the National Mourning Day, 15 August 2021.

== Accolades ==
List of awards and nominations
Organization	Year	Date	Category	Recipient	Result	Source
2nd Cinemaking International Film Festival	2022	6 January 2022	Best Actor (Character)	Jayanta Chattopadhyay	Won	

== See also ==
- 15 August 1975 Bangladesh coup d'état
