= Operation Sundarbans =

2022 Bangladeshi film directed by Dipankar Dipon

Operation Sunderbans
- Theatrical release poster
- Directed by: Dipankar Sengupta Dipon
- Written by: Dipankar Sengupta Dipon; Nazim Ud Daula
- Story by: Dipankar Sengupta Dipon
- Starring: Siam Ahmed; Ziaul Roshan; Riaz Ahmed; Nusraat Faria; Darshana Banik; Taskeen Rahman
- Cinematography: Ramyadip Saha
- Edited by: Mohammad Kalam, Prottoy Saha
- Music by: Pritom Hasan; Amlan Chakroborty
- Production companies: Three Wheeler's Limited; RAB Welfare Cooperative Society Ltd.
- Release date: 23 September 2022
- Running time: 141 mins
- Country: Bangladesh
- Language: Bengali
- Budget: ৳2.5 crore (US$200,000)

Operation Sundarbans or Operation Sundarban (Bengali: অপারেশন সুন্দরবন) is a Bangladeshi action thriller movie. The film was co-written and directed by Dipankar Sengupta Dipon. The film was produced by RAB Welfare Cooperative Society Ltd. Nazim-ud-Doula and Dipon wrote the screenplay. The plot is loosely based on real operations of RAB during the surrender of robbers of the Sundarbans as well as the struggle of Sundarbans' natives. It stars Riaz, Ziaul Roshan, Siam Ahmed, Taskeen Rahman, Shatabdi Wadud, Nusraat Faria and Darshana Banik, while Manoj Pramanik, debutant Samina Bashar, Dipu Imam, Ehsanur Rahman also joins the cast. The film begun its shooting on 20 December 2019 at Satkhira. This film got 3 national film awards in 2022 in Comedy, Male Singer category and Khokon Mollah in the Best Make-up Man category.

== Plot ==
The Sundarbans is the largest mangrove forest in the world, located in the southern part of Bangladesh. People of different trades in the region depend on this vast forest life. The pirates have persecuted these people for more than 40 years. People are not protected from the pirates of the Sundarbans which not only includes variety of species but also Royal Bengal Tiger.

In such a situation, the Rapid Action Battalion (RAB) Director General assigns the responsibility of the Sundarbans from the pirates to the RAB-7 commanding officer Ishtiaqe Ahmed. Ahmed launches an operation to make Sundarbans free of pirates with the help of commander of RAB Crime Prevention Unit (CPC)-1, Lieutenant Rishan (Ziaul Roshan) and the commander of newly formed Sundarbans Squad, Major Sayem (Siam Ahmed). Simultaneously, researcher Tania Kabir (Nusraat Faria) arrives in Sundarbans to do research on the tigers in the forest.

After the end of pirates episode, the team realizes that these bandits in the Sundarbans are just chess pieces. A disguised evil force is moving the wheels from behind. The team continues their fight against the mysterious forces at play.

== Cast ==
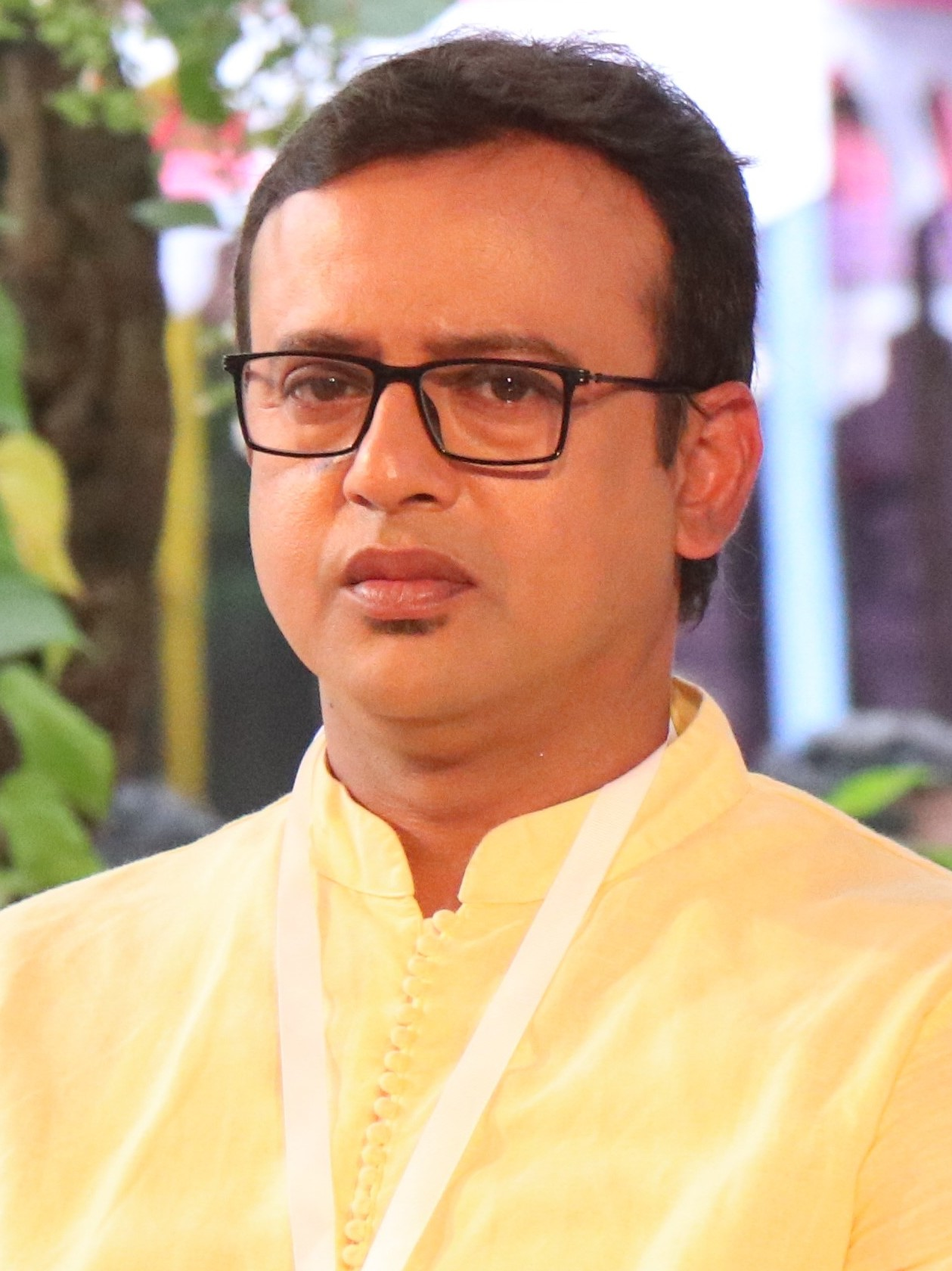
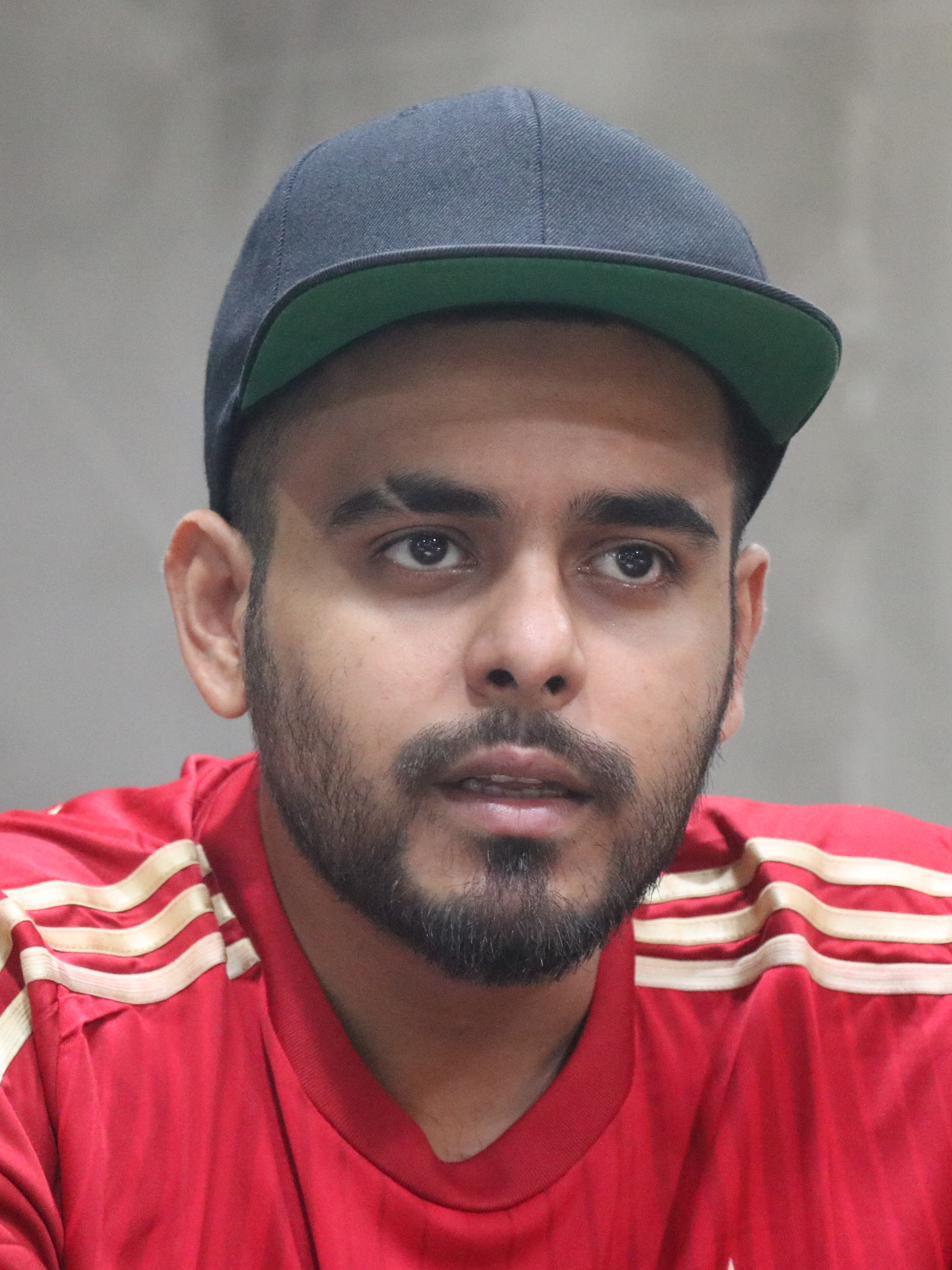
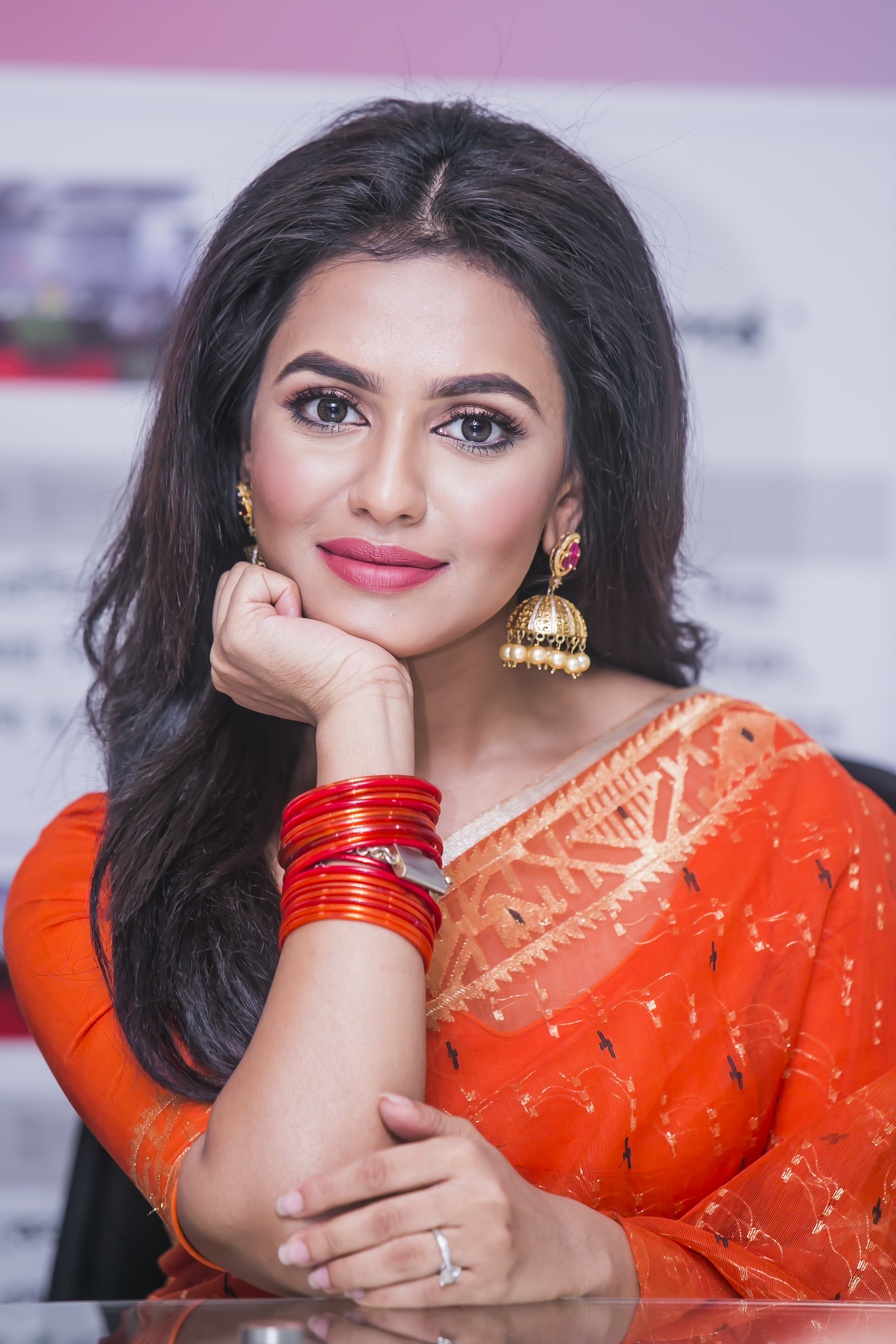
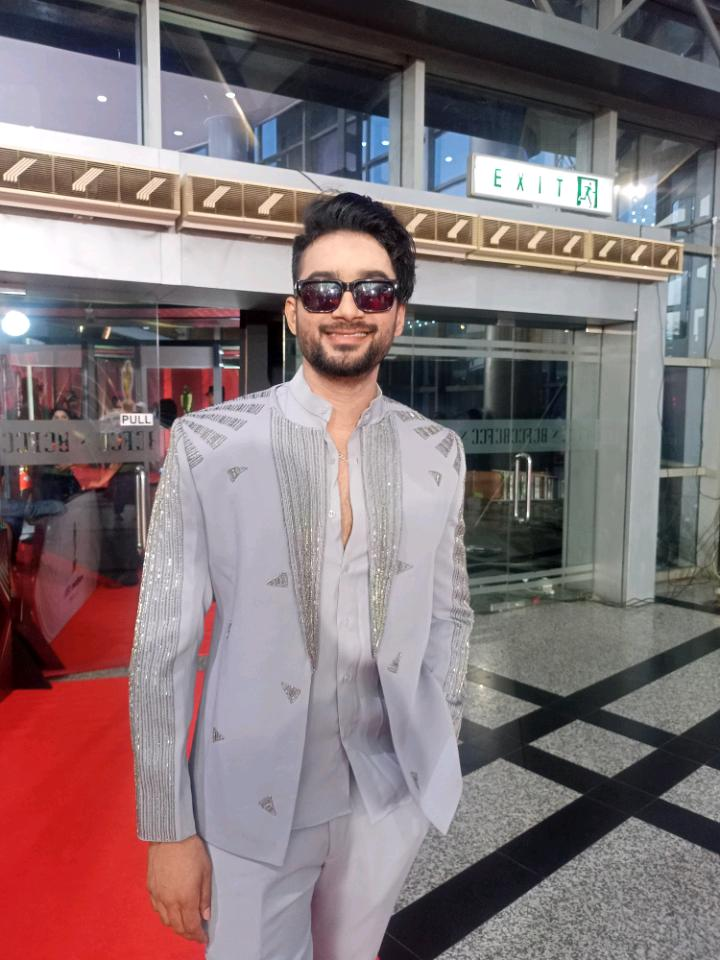
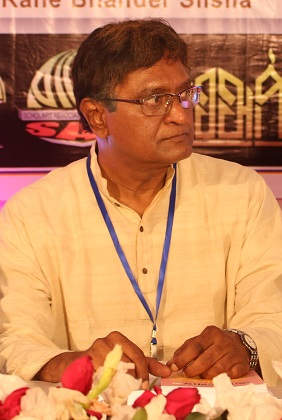
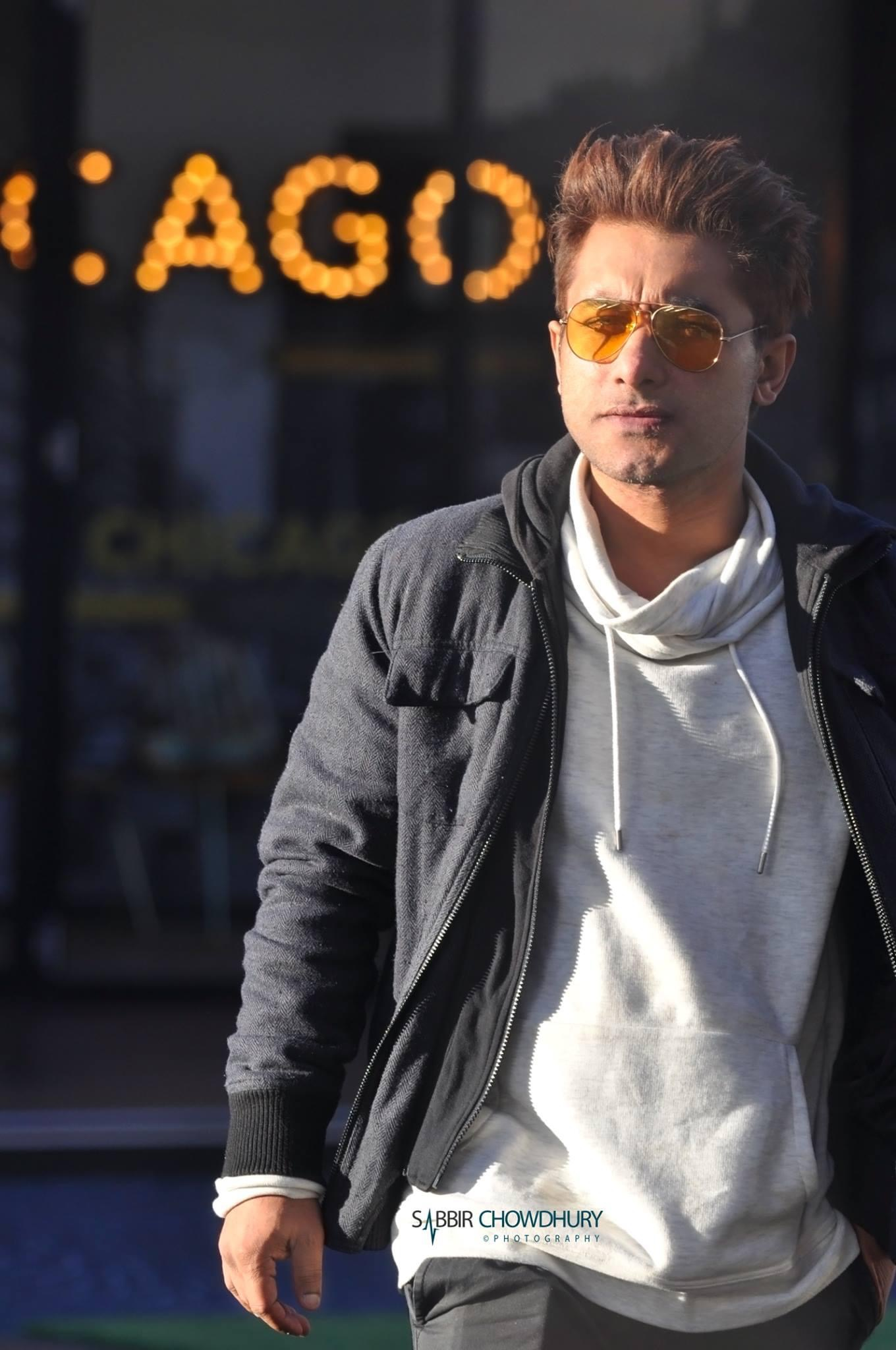
(Clockwise from top left) the film stars Riaz, Siam Ahmed, Nusraat Faria, Ziaul Roshan, Raisul Islam Asad and Taskeen Rahman.
- Riaz Ahmed as Ishtiaqe Ahmed, Battalion Commander and Circle officer.
- Siam Ahmed as Major Sayem Sadat. One of the high officials from RAB.
- Nusraat Faria as Tania Kabir, a tiger researcher.
- Ziaul Roshan as Lieutenant Commander Rishan.
- Darshana Banik as Dr. Aditi
- Raisul Islam Asad as Amjad Hussain
- Manos Bandyopadhyay as Director General of RAB
- Monir Khan Shimul as Additional Director General (OPS) of RAB operations
- Shatabdi Wadud as Mana
- Arman Parvez Murad as Habib Reza
- Rawnak Hasan as Palash
- Taskeen Rahman as Rakib
- Manoj Pramanik as Shaju
- Naresh Bhuiyan as Akkas
- Kazi Uzzal as Samad Master
- Tuya Chakraborty as Papri
- Ehsanur Rahman as Gozal
- Deepu Imam as Tie Harun
- Vaidyanatha as Lokman Majhi
- Khairul Alam Tipu as DAD Osman
- Nazim Hamid as Captain Asad
- Samina Bashar as Pakhi
- Shakila as Sumi
- Dukhu Sumon as Sumon
- Ratan Dev as Jalil
- Tuhin Tanzil as ASP Kayes
- Pranab Ghosh as Bachchu
- Raj as Ratul
- Rafi as Adnan
- Miskatul Jemin as Zara
- Nayeem Abir as Nayeem
- Arfan Shah Babu as Lalu
- Gopal Karmokar as Rakesh Shaha
- Masud Ahmed as Monir
- Md. Jahangir Alam as Selim

== Production ==
Even a few years ago, the forest was full of pirates, and as a result, the Sundarbans was a place feared by the ordinary people. Local Fishermen and honey extractors could not earn their livelihoods. These pirates and robbers are nowhere to be found now. Our RAB, and their operations in that region,... The film will be based on those operations.

— Dipankar Dipon to Dhaka Tribune

=== Development ===
In April 2018, major producer of this film RAB welfare cooperative pitched the idea to Dipon for developing the script for a film based on RAB's operation for uprooting the robbers of Sunderbans. Therefore, Dipon randomly went to Sunderbans to study the scope of this film as well did researches on Mangrove forest. After research, Dipon himself along with Nazim-ud-Doula and research team RDT prepared the screenplay. On 14 June 2019 Bangladeshi daily Prothom Alo wrote that RAB Welfare cooperative was to finance 4 Crore (40 million) Taka for this film production. The film was officially announced on 13 June 2019 by the both production houses.

=== Casting ===
Dipon kept the casting of these film in secret, later the cast was introduced on 1 November 2019 at an event held at Bagerhat Sheikh Helal Uddin Stadium for celebrating first year of robber-free Sunderban. Riaz, Nusraat, Roshan, Siam, Manoj Pramanik, Samina and Manoj Mitra made the primary cast list. Additionally Sheikh Ehsanur Rahman, Shatabdi Wadud, Manoj Mitro, and Tuya Chakraborthy have been cast in undisclosed roles. About hundred actors work in supporting roles including thirty members from RAB in non credited roles. Riaz, Nusraat, Roshan, Siam, Monoj Pramanik, Samina and Manoj Mitra made the primary cast list. Later few other actors like Sheikh Ehsanur Rahman, Dipu Imam, Shatabdi and Darshana confirmed their casting. Riaz, Roshan and Siam received special training from RAB before cast their roles. Actors also underwent pre-shoot grooming and rehearsals before principal photography has begun.

=== Locations ===
Mandar char, Bangabandhu char, Patnir char, Katkar char of greater Sunderbans forest was selected for primary shooting. Most of the outdoor shooting has taken places at Dublar Char, Alor Kol er Char, Kaalir Char, Meher Alir Char, Lakshmir Char and Hiron Point inside the deep forest of Sunderbans. Few indoor shoots taken from Bangladesh Film Development Corporation and various RAB facilitates in Dhaka and Gazipur.

=== Filming ===
Other the film songs, It took thirty six days to shoot the entire script. First phase of shooting has been started on 20 December 2019 at Buri Goalini, Chunkuri, Harinagar area near Sunderbans in Satkhira, was later for 16 days till 31 December 2019. Second phase of shooting starts from 13 February 2020, and stretched out up to 13 March 2020. Second phase shooting took places at the Bay of Bengal coast lines and Jamtala area and concluded on 11 March 2020.

== Music ==
Operation Sunderbans

Soundtrack album by Bappa Mazumder, Habib Wahid, Nandita, Imran Mahmudul, Dilshad Nahar Kona
- Released: 2022
- Genre: Film music
- Language: Bengali
- Producer: Amlan Chakraborty

Operation Sundarbans Soundtrack – Track listing
No.	Title	Lyrics	Singers	Length
1.	"E Mon Vije Jay"	Godhuli Sharma	Bappa Mazumder	3:21
2.	"Ovimani Roddure"	Sanjukta Saha Mishu	Habib Wahid and Nandita	4:15
3.	"Tar Hawate"	SK Dip	Imran Mahmudul and Dilshad Nahar Kona	3:31
Total length:				11:07

== Marketing ==
For marketing purposes, the film's production company used posters drawn by the country's classic film poster painter Bidesh Kumar Dhar.

== Controversy ==
On the day of the film's premiere, an assistant director, Tanin Khan, complained against the production team for not clearing his fee. He also accused the director of misbehaving with him. Responding to the complaint of Khan, director Dipon said that his dues were not explained for the non-completion of the project. The director also accused Khan of negligence in work and leaving without completing the second lot of the filming.

== Release ==
Its actual release date was 1 August 2020, but was postponed for COVID-19 epidemic. Later the date was changed to 21 July 2021 but wasn't released on that date. After the release of the official trailer on 29 July, the release date of the film was finalised to 23 September 2022. The film received clearance from the Bangladesh Film Censor Board on September 11. It was premiered in Star Cineplex, Bashundhara City on 20 September 2022. The film was scheduled to be released in 35 cinemas. The number of cinemas showing the film increased by 10 in the second week of its release. It was released in Sydney on 7 October 2022.

=== Critical response ===
The Daily Star called Operation Sundarbans an enjoyable film. MW Bangladesh Praised Operation Sundarbans by saying that it 'exceed the expections', giving the movie an A Grade Rating.

== Awards ==
Deepu Imam won the National Film Award 2022 award in the Comedian category for Operation Sundarbans. Bappa Mazumder got Best Singer awards in the male category in the National Film Award 2022 award. Khokon Mollah got awards in the Best Make-up Man category.
