= Tikit =

- Poster
- Genre: Dark comedy thriller
- Based on: Lottery by Mohammad Nazim Uddin
- Written by: Mohammad Nazim Uddin
- Screenplay by: Vicky Zahed; Nazim Ud Daula
- Story by: Mohammad Nazim Uddin
- Directed by: Vicky Zahed
- Starring: Siam Ahmed; Safa Kabir; Manoj Pramanik; Jannatul Ferdous Raisa
- Composer: Shahriar Marcell
- Country of origin: Bangladesh
- Original language: Bengali
- No. of seasons: 1
- No. of episodes: 6

Production
- Executive producer: Md. Habibur Rahman
- Producer: Redoan Rony
- Production location: Bangladesh
- Cinematography: Sumon Sarker
- Editor: Jobayar Abir Peal
- Production company: Chorki

Original release
- Network: Chorki
- Release: 1 February 2024

Tikit is a 2024 Bangladeshi dark comedy thriller web series directed by Vicky Zahed and produced by Redoan Rony under the banner of Chorki. The series based on Mohammad Nazim Uddin's story 'Lottery'. It stars Siam Ahmed, Safa Kabir, and Manoj Pramanik in the lead roles, alongside Jannatul Ferdous Raisa, Abdullah Al Sentu, Joy Raj, AK Azad Setu, Mahmood Alam, Badal Shahid. It was streaming on 1 February 2024 on OTT platform Chorki.

== Cast ==
- Siam Ahmed as Salek
- Safa Kabir
- Manoj Pramanik as Atabor
- Abdullah Al Sentu
- Joy Raj
- AK Azad Setu
- Mahmood Alam
- Badal Shahid
- Jannatul Ferdous Raisa

== Reception ==
Arnob Sanyal of Independent Television praised the series as a notable black comedy-thriller driven by a unique plot centered on human greed during a fateful bus journey. Ahnaf Md. Shafee Rahman of The Financial Express highlighted the suspenseful pacing and the story's effective portrayal of moral degradation over sudden fortune, while commending Siam Ahmed and the ensemble cast for bringing depth and dark comedy to the narrative.
