= Masud Rana (disambiguation) =

Masud Rana is a fictional character created by the writer Qazi Anwar Hussain.

Masud Rana may also refer to:

- Masud Rana (1974 film), a film based on the character
- Masud Rana (2026 film), a Bangladeshi film based on the character
- Masud Rana, birth name of Bangladeshi actor, producer, and businessman know as Shakib Khan (born 1979)
