= Masuma Rahman Nabila =

Bangladeshi actress, model and television presenter

- মাসুমা রহমান নাবিলা
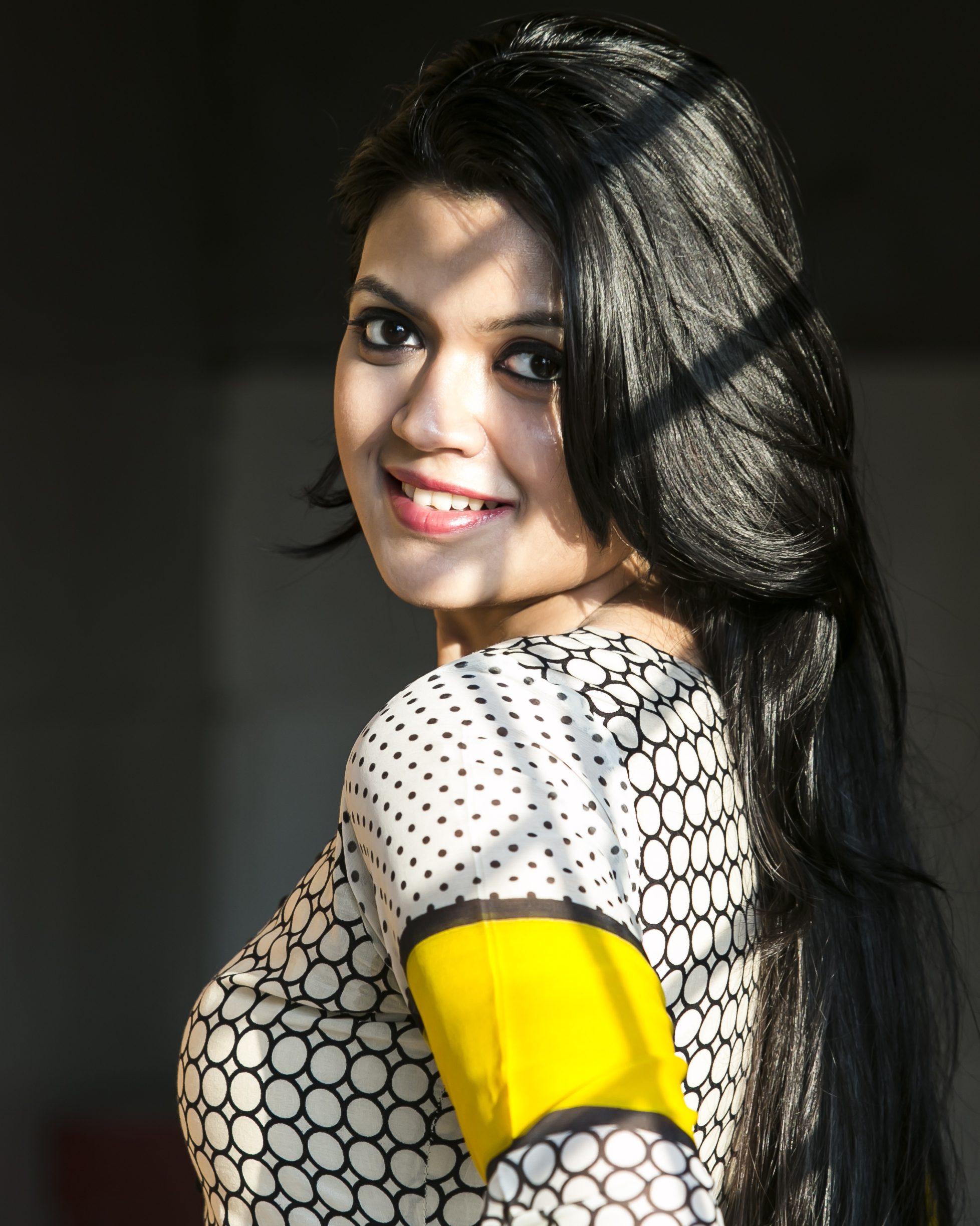
- Nabila in 2017
- Born: 8 April 1985 (age 41); Jeddah, Saudi Arabia
- Occupations: television presenter, model, actress
- Years active: 2006–present
- Spouse: Jubaidul Haque (m. 2018)
- Parent(s): Lutfar Rahman (Father); Shahana Chowdhury (Mother)

Masuma Rahman Nabila (born 8 April 1985) is a Bangladeshi television presenter, model and actress. She started her career in 2006 as a TV host.

== Early life ==
Nabila was born in Jeddah, Saudi Arabia. Her father Lutfar Rahman was appointed as an auditing officer in a private firm. She studied at Bangladesh International School & College in Jeddah. Nabila moved to Dhaka after completing her Secondary School Certificate (SSC). She finished her Higher Secondary School Certificate (HSC) at Viqarunnisa Noon School and College, and completed her B.A (Honours) in English from BRAC University.

== Modeling ==
Nabila made her modeling debut by doing a short appearance on a TVC in 2006 for sharp blade directed by Mostofa Sarwar Farooki. She has also done some photo shoots for magazine and newspapers.

== Television career ==
Nabila stepped into the media world with a school magazine show on Banglavision called Ebong Class Er Baire in 2006. Soon after she hosted a live quiz show called Janar ache bolar ache on NTV, Vocab on Banglavision and a live music request show Music Together on Banglavision. She has hosted some big events like BPL opening ceremony and the 100-day countdown to the ICC World Twenty20. Apart from TV show hosting, Nabila had participated in TV commercials for Robi, Fair & Lovely, Banglalink and Dabur Vatika Enriched Coconut Hair Oil etc. She is also a brand ambassador for Parachute Advanced Hair Oil.

=== Television ===
Year	Title	Role	Channel	Additional notes
2006–2007	Ebong class Er Baire	Host	Banglavision	School game show
2007	Vocab	Host	Banglavision	Quiz show
2008–2011	Janar ache bolar ache	Host	NTV	Live quiz show
2010–2012	Music Together	Host	Banglavision	Live musical show
2011	Hip hip hurray	Host	NTV	Live quiz show
2011–2013	Lucky line	Host	RTV	Live quiz show
2011	Clemon Extra Innings	Host	RTV	Talk show and analysis on ICC cricket world cup 2011
2012	Sing with MLTR	Host	Channel 9	music contest
2012	Robi Shera Protibha	Host	Maasranga Television	music contest
2013	Bpl opening ceremony	Host	Channel 9	Bangladesh Premier League opening ceremony
2013	Star Dance	Host	Asian TV	Dance reality show
2013	Brac Bank Meghe Dhaka Tara	Host	Maasranga Television	Dance and singing reality show
2013	Rater tara	Host	Asian TV	Celebrity talk show
2014	The Music Train	Host	Boishakhi TV	Live musical show
2014	T20 cricket blast	Host	Gazi Television	Cricket show
2014	Dabur Amla Extra Ordinary	Host	RTV	TV show on beauty & fashion
2014	Rtv star award	Host	RTV	Award ceremony
2014	Ifad morur Iftar	Host	RTV	Travel and cooking show
2014	Horlicks Family NutriShow	Host	NTV Banglavision Ekushey Television Desh TV	Cooking show
2014	marks allrounder 2014	Host	NTV	Talent hunt competition
2014	Dekhiye Dao Quiz Contest	Host	Independent Television (Bangladesh)	Quiz contest
2015	Cute Public Sports Master crickfreak	Host	Gazi Television	Cricket quiz contest
2015	Ifad morur Iftar	Host	RTV	Travel and cooking show
2015	Ujan Ganger Naiya – Season 1	Host	ATN Bangla	BBC show on a BBC fiction 'ujan ganger naiya'
2015	Nova Star moments	Host	ATN Bangla	Celebrity talk show
2016	Ujan Ganger Naiya – Season 2	Host	ATN Bangla	BBC show on a BBC fiction 'ujan ganger naiya'
2016	7Up Musical Premier League – Season 1	Host	Channel i	Musical reality show
2017	Coca-cola presents Ek dish dui cook	Host	Ekushey Television	cooking reality show
2017	Ananda Mela	Host	Bangladesh Television	Eid magazine show on Btv
2018	Lux Superstar	Host	Channel i	Beauty contest and talent hunt
2018	Bajlo Jhumoor Tarar Nupur	Host	Nagorik TV	Indo Bangla dance reality show
2019	Fun With Favourites	Host	News 24	Celebrity talk show
2019	Teer Advanced Kitchen	Host	Channel i	Kitchen makeover show
2020	Teer Little Chef Season 2	Host	Ntv	Cooking reality show

=== TV fiction ===
Year	Drama	Co-stars	Director	Channel
2015	Five Female Friends	Shriya Shorbojoya, Jannatul Ferdous Pia, DJ Sonica & Maria nur	Mabrur Rashid Bannah, Imraul Rafat, Goutam Koiri	Gazi Television
2017	March mashe shooting (Aynabaji Original Series 2017)	Ziaul Faruq Apurba, Gazi Rakayet	Amitabh Reza Chowdhury	Gazi Television, RTV (Bangladesh), Maasranga Television
2017	Kotha hobe to?(Osthir Somoy Shostir Golpo)	Manoj Kumar	Syed Ahmed Shawki	Gazi Television
2018	Shongshar (সংসার Valentine Day Natok 2018)	Ziaul Faruq Apurba	Mizanur Rahman Aryan	CD CHOICE (YouTube channel)
2018	The Original Artist	Kamruzzaman Kamu	Mahmudul Islam	Channel i
2019	Baishe April	Ziaul Faruq Apurba, Iresh Zaker, Manoj Pramanik, Mehzabien Chowdhury, Tanjin Tisha	Mizanur Rahman Aryan	NTV
2019	Chinno	Afran Nisho	Mizanur Rahman Aryan	Rtv

== Filmography ==
Nabila made her debut in the movie Aynabaji in 2016. The movie was a blockbuster and she has won many awards for her role in the film.

=== Films ===
Key
†	Denotes films that have not yet been released

Year	Title	Role	Notes	Ref.
2016	Ayanabaji	Hridi	Debut film	
2024	Toofan	Julie		
2026	Bonolota Sen	Banalata Sen	Based on Jibanananda Das's poem 'Banalata Sen'	

== Web works ==
Year	Title	OTT	Co-Artist	Director	Notes
2018	Mon Mondire	Bioscope	Manoj Kumar Pramanik	Mizanur Rahman Aryan	
2019	Paanch Phoron (Lilith)	Hoichoi	Siam Ahmed	Dipankar Dipon	
2019	Blood Rose	Iflix	Manoj Kumar Pramanik, Iresh Zaker, Rafiath Rashid Mithila	Redoan Rony	
2025	AKA	Hoichoi	Afran Nisho	Vicky Zahed	

== Radio show ==
Year	Title	Role	Channel	Additional notes
2014-2015	vaseline on the move	RJ	radioshadhin, peoples radio, colors fm	Lifestyle show

== Music video ==
Year	Song	Cast	Singer
2018	Bangladesher Meye	Anupam Roy, Masuma Rahman Nabila	Anupam Roy

== Awards and nominations ==
Year	Award	Category	Film	Result
2016	Meril Prothom Alo Awards (popular)	Best Film Actress	Aynabaji	Won
2016	Meril Prothom Alo Awards (popular)	Best female newcomer	Aynabaji	Nominated
2016	Meril Prothom Alo Awards (critque)	Best Film Actress	Aynabaji	Nominated
