= Mridha Bonam Mridha =

- Directed by: Roni Bhowmik
- Screenplay by: Raihan Khan
- Produced by: Roni Bhowmik
- Starring: Siam Ahmed; Nova Firoze; Tariq Anam Khan
- Production company: Toaster Production Creation
- Distributed by: Action Cut Entertainment
- Release date: 24 December 2021
- Running time: 138 mins
- Country: Bangladesh
- Language: Bengali

Mridha Bonam Mridha (lit. 'Mridha Vs Mridha') is a 2021 Bangladeshi courtroom film. Directed by Roni Bhowmik, the film stars Siam Ahmed, Nova and Tariq Anam Khan in lead roles.

== Cast ==
- Siam Ahmed – Ashfaqul Mridha
- Nova – Oishi
- Tariq Anam Khan – Ashraful Mridha
- Sanjida Preeti – Barrister Charlene
- Nima Rahman – Judge
- Milon Bhattacharya – Mozammel
- Masudul Amin Rintu – Boss
- Taufiqul Iman – Aishe's father
- Anshuman Chatterjee – Charlene's father

== Production and release ==
Mridha Bonam Mridha began shooting in February 2021 and wrapped up in August. It was the first feature film directed by Roni Bhowmik. The film was shot in Dhaka and Chittagong. The soundtrack of the film is composed by Emon Saha.

The film got approval from the censor board on December 12. Its premiere was held in Dhaka on 20 December. Then the film was released in 30 cinemas in Bangladesh on 24 December. The film was released on the online platform "Toffee" on the occasion of Eid-ul-Fitr in 2022. The film was also aired on Maasranga Television.

== Music ==
Mridha Bonam Mridha

Soundtrack album by Jahid Nirob, Mahtim Sakib, Tasnuva, Adiba, Ragib Swagata, Oyshee, Tariq Mridha
- Released: 2021
- Genre: Film music
- Language: Bengali

=== Soundtracks ===
No.	Title	Lyrics	Music	Singer	Length
1.	"Hridoy Jure Boiche"	Tushar Rahman	Jahid Nirob	Jahid Nirob
2.	"Uttar Jani Na"	Tushar Rahman	Tushar Rahman	Mahtim Sakib, Tasnuva, Adiba
3.	"Ore Amar Baap"	Ragib Swagata	Murtoza Khan Lodi	Ragib Swagata, Oyshee
4.	"Mukhosh"	Tariq Mridha	EK Majumdar Isti	Tariq Mridha

== Awards and nominations ==
Awards	Category	Nomination	Result	Ref
46th National Film Awards	Best Actor	Siam Ahmed	Won	
46th National Film Awards	Best Actor in Comedy Role	Milon Bhattacharya	Won	
23rd Meril-Prothom Alo Awards	Best Film Actor (Stars Poll)	Siam Ahmed	Won	
23rd Meril-Prothom Alo Awards	Best Film Actor (Stars Poll)	Tariq Anam Khan	Nominated	
23rd Meril-Prothom Alo Awards	Best Film Actress (Stars Poll)	Nova Firoze	Nominated	
