= O Hey Shyam =

2018 Bangladeshi song

Song by Emon Saha featuring Imran Mahmudul, Dilshad Nahar Kona

from the album Poramon 2
- Language: Bengali
- Released: 25 May 2018
- Genre: Soundtrack; Baul; folk
- Length: 3:20
- Label: Jaaz Multimedia
- Songwriter: Shah Alam Sarker
- Composer: Emon Saha
- Lyricist: Shah Alam Sarker
- Producer: Emon Saha

Music video
- "O Hey Shyam" on YouTube

O Hey Shyam is a song from the 2018 film Poramon 2, sung by Imran Mahmudul and Dilshad Nahar Kona. The song is composed by Emon Saha and lyrics were penned by Shah Alam Sarkar. Mahmudul and Kona won the Meril-Prothom Alo Award in 2019 for Best Singer for the song. It was released on May 25, 2018 under the label of Jaaz Multimedia.

== YouTube ==
The song received over 1.2 million views on YouTube within the first six days of its release. As of July 2024, the song has been viewed over 110 million on YouTube.

== Credits and personnel ==
According to the official music video of the song on YouTube, the credits of the song are mentioned below.

- Emon Saha – Music
- Shah Alam Sarkar – Lyrics
- Saiful Shahin – DOP
- Jayesh Pradhan – Choreographer
- Sumitra Sarkar – Colourist
- Ediview studios – VFX
- Mostakim Suzon – Edit
- Shakib Soukhin – Promotional Manager
- Arnil Hasan Rabby – Digital Marketing

== Awards and nominations ==
Date	Awards	Category	Nominee	Result	Ref
26 April 2019	Meril-Prothom Alo Awards	Best Singer	Imran Mahmudul	Won	
26 April 2019	Meril-Prothom Alo Awards	Best Singer	Dilshad Nahar Kona	Won	
