= Siam Ahmed =

Bangladeshi actor

- সিয়াম আহমেদ
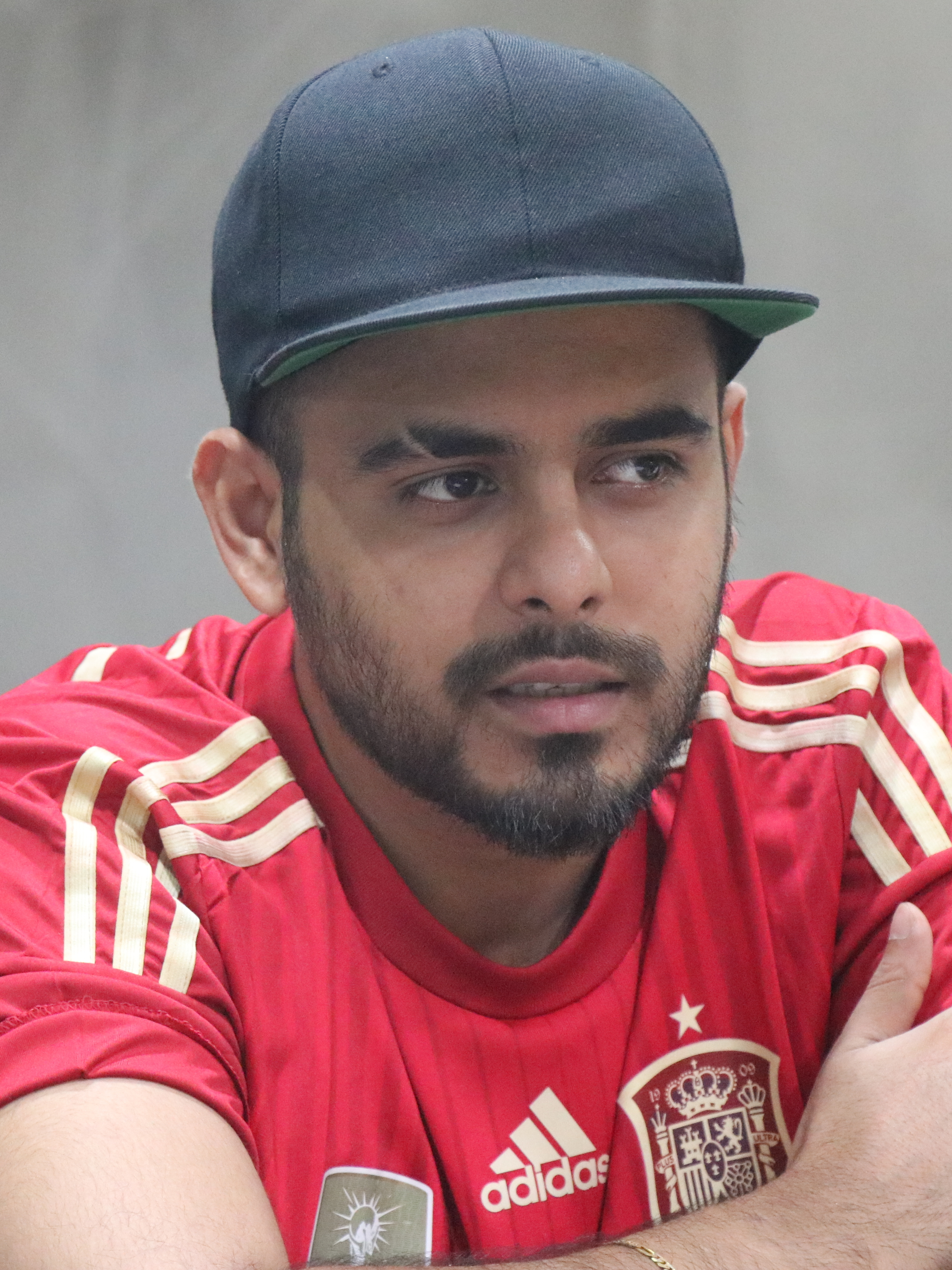
- Siam in 2018
- Born: March 29, 1990 (age 36); Dhaka, Bangladesh
- Education: University of London; Northumbria University; Lincoln's Inn
- Occupation: Actor
- Years active: 2013-present
- Spouse: Shamma Rushafy Abantee (m. 2018)
- Awards: full list

Siam Ahmed (born 29 March 1990) is a Bangladeshi film actor and barrister. Known for his versatile roles, style, and intensity, Siam has often portrayed flawed heroes on screen. He made his debut in the Bangladeshi telefilm Bhalobasha 101 and is best known for his TV series Nine and a half and debut role in the film Poramon 2 (2018) directed by Raihan Rafi. He is also well known for his various roles in Bengali TV dramas. He won the Bangladesh National Film Award for Best Actor twice for his roles in Bishwoshundori (2020) and Mridha Bonam Mridha (2021).

== Early life and education ==
Siam was born in Dhaka on 29 March 1990. He completed his Secondary School Certificate (SSC) from Motijheel Model School and College, and later graduated from Notre Dame College, Dhaka with a Higher Secondary Certificate (HSC). After completing HSC, he studied Accounting and Information Systems (AIS) at the University of Dhaka. Later, he completed his Diploma and LLB Hons from University of London. He did his Bar Professional Training Course (BPTC) from Lincoln's Inn. He also did his PGDL from Northumbria University Newcastle.

== Career ==
Siam Ahmed started his career as a model for Airtel Bangladesh. His first drama was Bhalobasha 101 by Redoan Rony. After that he acted, one by one, in many TV dramas including Megh Enechi Bheja, Happy Ending, X factor Reload, Tomar Amar Prem etc. He has been praised a lot for his short film Bokhate. In 2018 he joined Dhallywood and his debut movie was PoraMon 2. He also performed in some music videos like Bondhurey, Cholna Sujon, Tumi Chaile, Deyale Deyale etc. He also worked in Hoichoi web film Lilith starring Masuma Rahman Nabila.

== Personal life ==
Siam is married to Shamma Rushafy Abantee since December 2018.

== Filmography ==
=== Films ===
Key
†	Denotes films that have not yet been released

Year	Films	Role	Notes	Ref.
2018	Poramon 2	Sujon	Debut film; a sequel of PoraMon	
2018	Dahan	Tula		
2019	Fagun Haway	Nasir		
2020	Bishwoshundori	Shadhin		
2021	Mridha Bonam Mridha	Ashfaqul Mridha		
2022	Taan	Rashed	Released on Chorki	
2022	Shaan	Shaan		
2022	Paap Punno	Al Amin		
2022	Operation Sundarbans	Major Sayem Sadat		
2022	Damal	Durjoy		
2023	Adventure of Sundarbans	Ratul		
2023	Punormilone	Ontu	Released on Chorki	
2023	Antarjal	Lumin		
2023	Mujib: The Making of a Nation	Shamsul Huq		
2025	Rickshaw Girl	Himself	Special appearance	
2025	Jongli	Mehedi Hasan Jonny "Jongli"		
2025	Taandob	Armaan Mansoor	Special appearance	
2026	Rakkhosh	Rusho / Nisho	Dual role	
2027	Andhar †	Detective Delwar	Completed; scheduled for release on 26 March 2027	
2027	Abar Dekha Holo †	TBA	Filming	

== Television ==
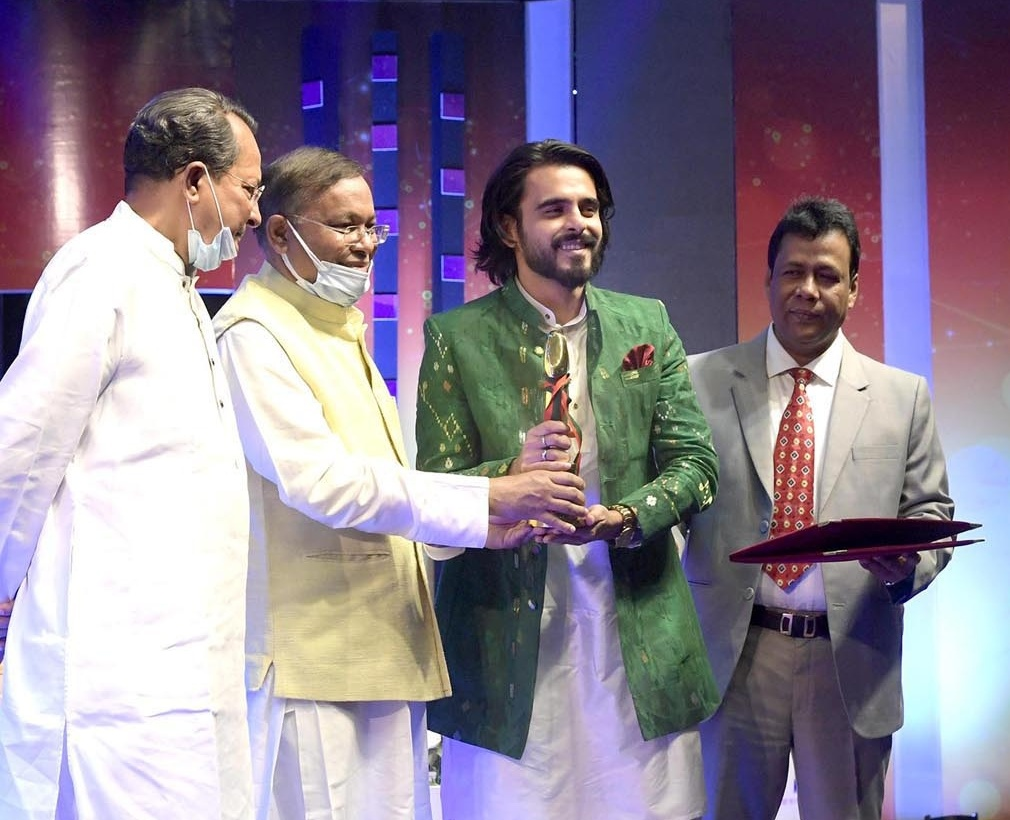
Siam Ahmed receives National Film Awards 2020.

Year	Title	Role	Director	Notes
2014	Bhalobasha 101	Afnan	Redoan Rony	
	Nine and a half		Mabrur Rashid Bannah	
2015	Room Date		Imraul Rafat	
2015	Valobasha Unlimited		Evan Rehan	
	Tomar Amar Prem		Mizanur Rahman Aryan	
	Megh Enechi Veja		Rubayet Mahmud	
	Ke? Keno? Kivabe?		Taneem Rahman Angshu	
	X Factor Reload	Moin	Shihab Shaheen	
	Superstar		Raihan Khan	
	Torun Turkey		Imraul Rafat	
	Cheleti Obontike Bhalobeshechilo		Mabrur Rashid Bannah	
	Too Late Bachelor		Mehedi Hasan Jony	
	Moddho Dupur		Tania Ahmed	
	Moner Vetor Nodi		Saidur Rahman Rasel	
	Bunoful		Avro Mahmud	
	Pahare Megher Chaya		Mahfuz Ahmed	
	Alor Pakhi			
	Shongi		Shojib Khan	
	Till The End		Mabrur Rashid Bannah	
	Air Bender		Taneem Rahman Angshu	
	Mr. Boyfriend		Khairul Papon	
	Chutir Nimontrone		Tuhin Hasan	
	Jackson Billal		Shihab Shaheen	
2017	Prem Potro		Mabrur Rashid Bannah	
	Chirkuter Shobdo		Md. Mehedi Hasan Jony	
	Happy Ending		Zakaria Showkhin	
	Shopno Jabe Bari		Rubayet Mahmud	
	Dampotto		Tauquir Ahmed	
	Abaro Tomar Golpo		Goutam Koiri	
	Tobuo Bhalobashi		Rubayet Mahmud	
	Toke Valobeshe		Subhro Khan	
	Clash Of Girlfriend		Md. Mehedi Hasan Jony	
	Friendship Love and Something More		Mabrur Rashid Bannah	
	Angry Story		Mabrur Rashid Bannah	
	Dur Pahar		Sagar Jahan	
	Amaro Ekta Prem Kahini Ache		Abu Raihan Jewel	
	22 Shey Srabon			
	Lonely Touch		Anonno Emon	
	Kaktaruar Prem		Md. Mehedi Hasan Jony	
	Amar Bela Je Jay		Rahat Mahmud	
	Agomoni Gaan		Chayanika Chowdhury	
	Valobashar Tin Bela		Chayanika Chowdhury	
	Mon Shudhu Mon Chuyeche			
	Valobeshechile		Chayanika Chowdhury	
	Shedin O Eshechilo Boshonto		Chayanika Chowdhury	
	Ke Kothay		Jewel Rana	
	Songshar		Tauquir Ahmed	
	Bhul		M. I. Monir	
	Sompod		Shakhawat Manik	
	Blue Bird		Anonno Emon	
	Matir Manush		Musafir Rony	
	No Objection		Noyeem Imtiaz Neyamul	
	Poth Jana Nei		Shahin Swadhin	
	Notun Vore Dekha		Chayanika Chowdhury	
	Rokto Komol		Asadur Rahman Rubel	
	Nil Aboron		Topu Khan	

== Web series ==
Year	Title	OTT	Character	Director	Notes
2019	Paanch Phoron	Hoichoi	Lilith	Dipankar Dipon	
2020	Morichika	Chorki	Shakil	Shihab Shaheen	
2024	Tikit	Chorki	Salek	Vicky Zahed	

== Short films ==
Year	Film	Director
2016	Bokhate	Swaraj Dev
2017	Araal	Swaraj Dev
2017	Bolo Bhalobashi	Taneem Rahman Angshu
2017	Jhorer Pore	Sanjoy Somaddar
2018	15 Din	Mizanur Rahman Aryan
2018	Mon	Vicky Zahed

== Awards ==
Awards	Year	Award Section	For	Result	Ref
Sunsilk RTV Star Award	2017	Best TV Actor	Jackson Billal	Won	
Bachsas Awards	2018	Best Actor	Dahan	Won	
Meril Prothom Alo Awards	2018	Best Actor People's Choice	Poramon 2	Won	
Bharat Bangladesh Film Award	2019	Best Actor	Poramon 2	Won	
National Film Awards	2020	Best Actor	Bishwoshundori	Won	
Meril Prothom Alo Awards	2022	Best Actor	Mridha Vs Mridha	Won	
BFDA Awards	2023	Best Actor in OTT	Taan	Won	
