= Tagar (film) =

- Movie poster
- Directed by: Aalok Hasan
- Written by: AR Movie Network team
- Produced by: AR Movie Network
- Starring: Ador Azad; Puja Cherry; Azad Abul Kalam; Rosey Siddiqui; Sumon Anwar
- Cinematography: Ismail Hossain Liton
- Edited by: Rony Shikder Jitu
- Music by: Ayush Das
- Production company: AR Movie Network
- Distributed by: AR Movie Network; Tiger Media
- Release date: June 7, 2025
- Running time: 144 Minutes
- Country: Bangladesh
- Language: Bangla

Tagar is 2025 Bangladeshi action thriller film directed by Aalok Hasan and produced and distributed by AR Movie Network. The film stars Ador Azad and Puja Cherry in the lead roles, alongside Azad Abul Kalam, Rosey Siddiqui, Sumon Anwar, Jojon Mahmud, LR Khan Simanto, and Shariful in supporting roles. The story and screenplay are developed by the AR Movie Network team, while the dialogues are written by Mamunur Rashid Tanim.

== Cast ==
- Ador Azad as Tagar
- Puja Cherry as Joyeeta
- Azad Abul Kalam
- Rosey Siddique
- Sumon Anowar
- Jojon Mahmud
- Lutfor Rahman Khan Shimanto
- [>Shoriful]]

== Production ==
The cinematography for the film Tagar is handled by Ismail Hossain Liton. Rahmatullah Basu serves as the art director, Chunnu as the fight director, and Monir Hossain is responsible for makeup.

The film was officially announced on January 1, 2025, through an announcement teaser. The teaser confirmed that Ador Azad and Prarthana Fardin Dighi would appear as an on-screen pair for the first time. Director Aalok Hasan confirmed to Channel i that filming was scheduled to begin on February 1, 2025, and that the film would be in the action-thriller genre.

Around a month and a half after the film's announcement, a motion poster was released on February 22, 2025, featuring Puja Cherry instead of Prarthana Fardin Dighi. It was subsequently confirmed that Cherry had replaced Dighi in the lead role. Director Aalok Hasan cited Dighi's unprofessional behavior as the reason for the replacement.

Principal photography of the film began in Chittagong on February 25, 2025.

== Music ==
Following a long hiatus from playback, Asif Akbar made his return with the title track of the film, which was written by Jannat Ara Ferdous Mila and composed and arranged by Ayush Das.

== Marketing ==
A glimpse was revealed on 10 May 2025, coinciding with Azad's birthday. First official poster of the film was unveiled on 20 May 2025.

== Release ==
The film is scheduled to be released on June 7, 2025, to coincide with Eid al-Adha.
