= Masum Parvez Rubel =

Bangladeshi actor (born 1960)

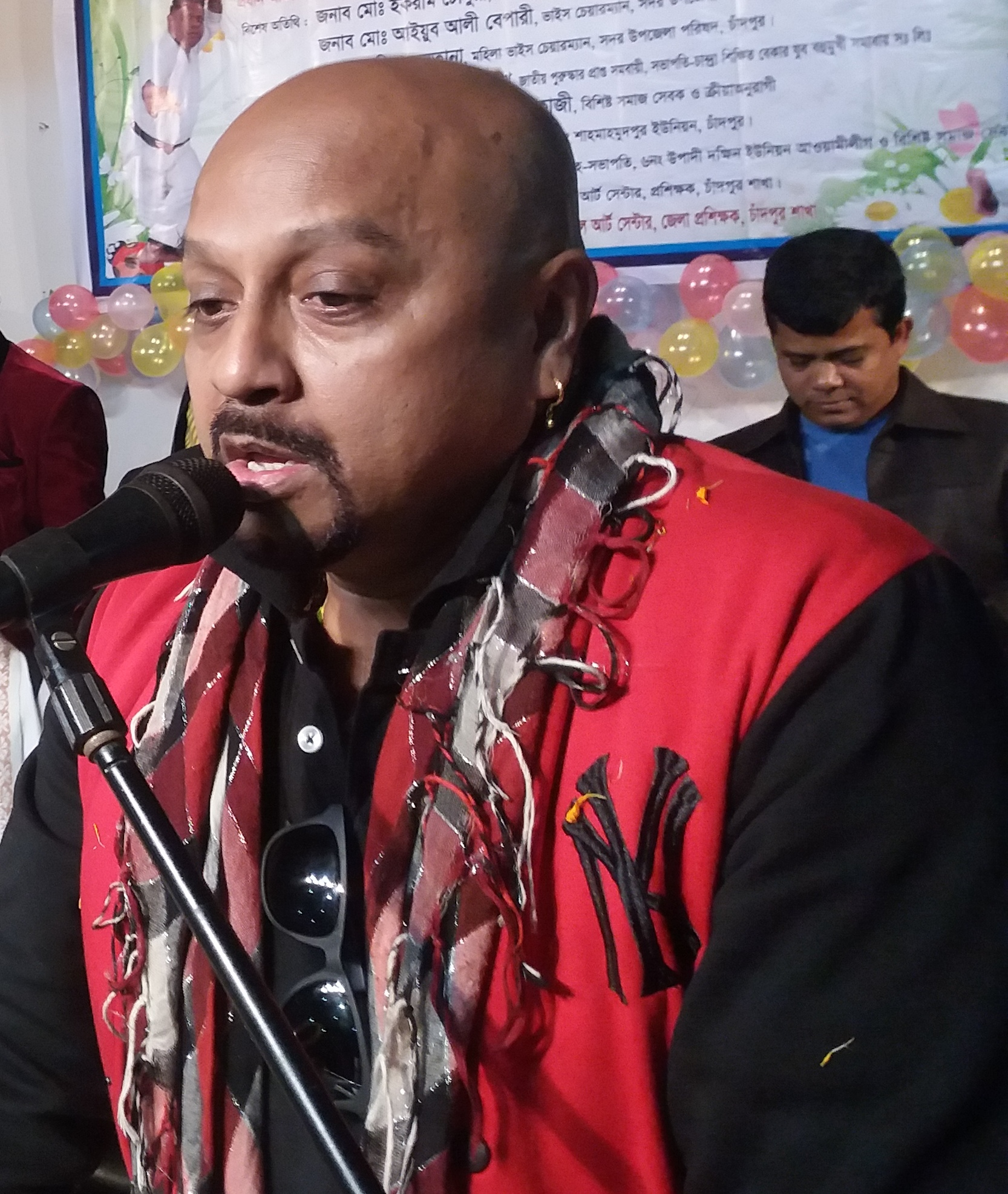
- Rubel in 2020
- Born: Masum Parvez Rubel; 3 May 1960 (age 66); Barisal, Bangladesh
- Education: University of Dhaka
- Occupations: Actor; director; producer
- Years active: 1986–present
- Awards: National Karate Championship, 1982 and 1983

Masum Parvez Rubel (born 3 May 1960) is a Bangladeshi film actor, fighting director, producer and director, who predominantly worked in Dhallywood cinema. He made his debut in the silver screen with the film Loraku (1986).

== Birth & Education ==
Rubel was born on 3 May 1960 in Barisal. His father Auwal Malek and mother Dilowara. His elder brother is actor and film director Masud Parvez Sohel Rana.

He completed a master's degree in Political Science from University of Dhaka. While studying at the university, he became skilled in karate. He won gold medals at National Karate Championship in 1982 and 1983.

== Career ==
Rubel's career in the Bengali film industry began with the film Laraku. He has appeared in over 200 films. His notable films are Utthan Poton, Uddhar, Bir Purush, Bajromusti, and Vondo.

He established himself as one of top action stars of the film industry with his characters, seen as amicable by viewers. His movies would mainly highlight various issues in society in town areas such as in police department, highways, laws, and even schools.

Some of his notable films in early stage of his career from 1986 to 1999 include Shotru Voyonkar, Sontrash, Orjon, Bir Juddha, Akorma, Mayer Kanna, Top Rongbaz, Griho Juddho, Ondho Ain, Grinah, Poradhin, Mrittu Dondo, Judge Saheb, Shajan, Bissho Premik, Charidike Shotru, Sontrashi Nayok, Baba Keno Asami, Ulka, Biopd Songket, Rakkhush, Nil Sagorer Tire, Polatok Asami, Omar Akbar, Malamal, and Ghatak.

He suddenly started to lower his film commitment to focus on family and business after 2000 and started his karate school to teach young teenagers how to fight and stop bullying, harassment, and protect themselves from thugs. Since then, he has acted in less films but still be able to act in leading roles. During this period his notable films tend to be Bicchu Bahini, Joddha, Return Ticket, Shikari, Vondo, Churmar, Bishakto Chokh, Ferari Ashami, and Kothin Shasti.

On 28 January 2022, Rubel became a vice-president of the Bangladesh Film Artists' Association after obtaining 191 votes.

== Personal life ==
He married Sultana Parvez Neela. They have one son, Niloy Parvez.

== Works ==
Year	Films	Role	Notes	Ref.
1986	Loraku	Rubel	Debut film	
1998	Bipod Songket	Raja Mastan		
2000	Juddha	Biplob	Won– Bachsas Awards for Best Film Actor	
2001	Bicchu Bahini	Bhashon Chowdhury	Won– Bachsas Award for Best Film Actor	
2015	Warning	DCDB Murad Hasan		
2015	Black Money	Police Officer GK Kamal		
2022	71 Er Ek Khondo Itihas	Rubel	Based on Bangladesh Liberation War	
2023	Kill Him	Tiger		

Web series
Year	Title	Role	Notes	Ref.
2025	Black Money	Benson Junaid	Series on Bongo BD	
