= Puja Cherry =

Bangladeshi actress and model (born 2002)

Puja Cherry Roy
- পূজা চেরি
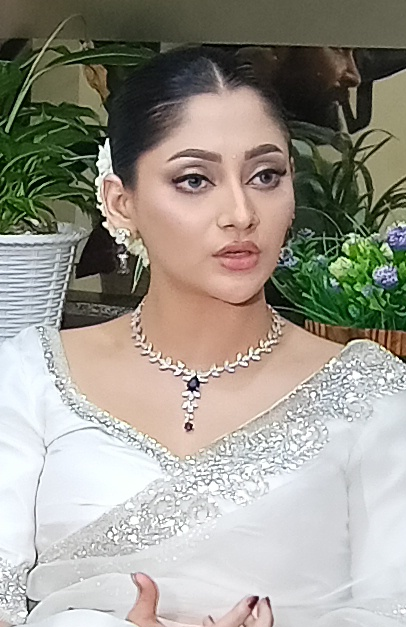
- Cherry in 2025
- Born: Puja Cherry Roy; 20 August 2002 (age 24); Gazirhat, Khulna, Bangladesh
- Education: Siddheswari Degree College
- Occupations: Model; actress
- Years active: 2011–present

Puja Cherry Roy (born 20 August 2002) is a Bangladeshi film actress and model. She debuted as a child actress in the film Moner Ghore Bosot Kore (2011), though her scenes were cut from the final release. Her first released role was in Bhalobashar Rong (2012), followed by her lead role debut in the Indo-Bangladesh joint production film Noor Jahaan (2018).

She gained prominence for her role as Pori in PoraMon 2 (2018), earning the Meril Prothom Alo Award for Best Actress. She has also acted in promotional advertising. She is widely regarded as the most popular and successful Bangladeshi actress of this time.

== Early life and education ==
Cherry was born on 20 August 2002 in Gazirhat, Khulna, Bangladesh, to Dev Proshad Roy and Jorna Roy (d. 2024). She completed her Junior School Certificate (JSC) examination at Dhaka Cantonment Girls' Public School & College. She then completed her secondary education at Moghbazar Girls High School, passing her Secondary School Certificate (SSC) examination in 2019 from the business studies group. She completed her Higher Secondary Certificate (HSC) examination from Siddheswari Degree College in 2021–22 from the arts group. Cherry continued her studies at Siddheswari Degree College, affiliated with the National University, Bangladesh, pursuing a degree program.

== Career ==
Puja Cherry began her acting career as a child actress in the film Moner Ghore Bosot Kore (2011), directed by Zakir Hossain Raju, where she was cast as Shakib Khan's sister. Her scenes were cut from the final release, disappointing her mother, Jorna Roy, who had invited around 20 family members, friends, and neighbors to the screening at BDR Cinema Hall. Initially aspiring for Puja to become a lawyer, Jorna resolved to support her daughter's pursuit of becoming a lead actress after this experience. Cherry went on to appear in child roles in films such as Bhalobashar Rong (2012), Agnee (2014), and Krishnopokkho (2016), and gained early recognition through a popular Teletalk 3G commercial.

Her breakthrough came with the 2018 Indo-Bangladesh romantic drama Noor Jahaan, where she played the lead role of Jahaan opposite Adrit Roy, earning praise for her emotional depth and on-screen chemistry. That same year, her role as Pori in PoraMon 2 with Siam Ahmed became a commercial success, winning her the Meril Prothom Alo Award for Best Actress (Public Choice) and solidifying her status as a leading actress in Dhallywood. She further showcased her versatility in the political drama Dahan (2018) and the romantic drama Prem Amar 2 (2019), both of which expanded her fanbase in Bangladesh and West Bengal.

Cherry continued to diversify her portfolio with roles in the action film Shaan (2022), the romantic drama Golui (2022), and the novel-based Hridita (2022). In 2023, she starred in the horror film Jinn and the web film Pori on Deepto Play. In 2024, she appeared in the web series Black Money, performing in the song "Premer Dokandar," which garnered significant online praise for her captivating presence. She is set to star in the action film Tagar opposite Adar Azad, with a planned release for Eid-ul-Adha 2025, and in Agnee 3 and Masud Rana, both awaiting release. Known for her natural acting and growing popularity, Cherry has established herself as one of Dhallywood's youngest leading actresses with a promising career ahead.

== Personal life ==
In March 2026, Cherry stated that she is engaged and planning to marry, but did not reveal her fiancé's name.

== Filmography ==
=== As lead roles ===
Key
†	Denotes films that have not yet been released

Year	Title	Role	Notes	Ref.
2018	Noor Jahaan	Jahaan	Debut film as lead role; Indo-Bangladesh joint production	
2018	PoraMon 2	Pori		
2018	Dahan	Asha		
2019	Prem Amar 2	Apurba	Indo-Bangladesh joint production	
2022	Shaan	Riya		
2022	Psycho	Jahan Khan		
2022	Golui	Mala		
2023	Jinn	Monalisa		
2023	Pori	Pori	Released on DeeptoPlay	
2024	Lipstick	Buchi / Madhuri (Note: Puja played a single character with two or more names in the film)		
2024	Agontuk	Shraboni Akter "Iti"		
2025	Tagar	Joyeeta		
2026	Domm: Until The Last Breath	Rani		
2026	Masud Rana	Sohana		
TBA	Agnee 3 †	TBA	Filming	
TBA	Nakphuler Kabbo †	TBA	Awaiting Release	

=== As child artist ===
Year	Title	Role	Director	Notes	Ref.
2011	Moner Ghore Bosot Kore	Child artist	Jakir Hossain Raju	Deleted scenes	
2011	Chotto Songsar	Child artist	Montazur Rahman Akbar		
2012	Sontaner Moto Sontan	Child artist	Shaheen Sumon		
2012	Nayori	Child artist	Mohammad Amin		
2012	Bhalobasar Rong	Child artist	Shaheen Sumon		
2013	Most Welcome	Child artist	Anonno Mamun		
2013	My Name Is Khan	Child artist	Badiul Alam Khokon		
2013	Tobuo Bhalobashi	Child artist	Montazur Rahman Akbar		
2014	Daring Lover	Child artist	Badiul Alam Khokon		
2014	Agnee	Young Tanisha	Iftakar Chowdhury		
2014	Most Welcome 2	Police officer Aryan's sister	Ananta Jalil		
2015	Blackmail	Young Arin	Anonno Mamun		
2016	Krishnopokkho	Young Zeba	Meher Afroz Shaon	Based on Humayun Ahmed's novel	
2016	Badsha The Don	Badsha's sister	Baba Yadav	Indo-Bangladesh joint production	

=== Web series ===
Year	Title	Role	Notes	Ref.
2025	Black Money	Miss Shaila	Debut in web series; released on Bongo BD	

== Awards and nominations ==
Meril-Prothom Alo Awards

Year	Category	Film	Result	Ref.
2018	Best Film Actress (Public Choice)	PoraMon 2	Won	
2018	Best Film Actress (Critics Choice)	PoraMon 2	Nominated	
2018	Best Newbie	PoraMon 2	Nominated	
2022	Best Film Actress	Golui	Nominated	
2026	Best Film Actress	Domm: Until The Last Breath	Nominated	
