= Prem Puran =

Bangladeshi short film

- Promotional poster
- Bengali: প্রেম পুরাণ
- Directed by: Zahid Gogon
- Written by: Zahid Gogon
- Produced by: Mohim Ahmed Naim; Arif Sonnet
- Starring: Manoj Pramanik; Samia Othoi; Arman Parvez Murad
- Cinematography: Kamrul Hasan Khosru
- Edited by: Sazal Alok
- Music by: Aseer Arman
- Production company: Film Mistri
- Distributed by: Lag Velki
- Release dates: December 2019 (Mumbai Short); 12 February 2021
- Running time: 35 minutes
- Country: Bangladesh
- Language: Bangla

Prem Puran (Bengali: প্রেম পুরাণ; also known in English as Myth of Love: A Known Story) is a 2019 Bangladeshi drama short film scripted and directed by Zahid Gogon under the Film Mistry's banner. The film stars Manoj Pramanik as a government education officer and Samia Othoi as Shanu, who leaves the luxury of the big city for her extremely Idealist lover. Before its release, the film has participated in several international film festivals. Prem Puran was released on February 12, 2021, on Lagvelki OTT platform. The film has gained several accolades from various film festivals.

== Plot ==
Shimul is a middle-aged man who has traveled to a remote town of Bangladesh for his official work. He paid a visit to his old friend Shanu, who left behind her luxurious life in a big city and had moved in that small township after having eloped with her husband, Tajul. Tajul is an extremely idealistic person who believes in morality above all as a teacher and doesn’t care that he has to live in extreme poverty to maintain that. Apparently, Shimul finds out that both of them have been working hard to run the family in a conscientious way. To keep each other's idealistic life intact, both of them are doing secret side jobs to run their family.

== Cast ==
Credits adapted from The Business Standard.

- Manoj Pramanik as Shimul
- Samia Othoi as Shanu
- Arman Parvez Murad as Mad man
- Ashok Bepari as Tajul
- Pankaj Majumder as Caretaker
- Wania as Shanu's Daughter

== Production ==
The screenplay of Prem Puran is loosely based on The Gift of the Magi, Raincoat, "Bhanga Chora" by Zahir Raihan and some true stories of an Adamjee Jute Mills worker leader Shahid Tajul Islam, who died in 1986. Gogon worked on the script for one year, before going for principal photography. The film was produced by Film Mistry with partial crowd funding. Half of the film was completed in 2016, and halted due to lack of funding. Rest of the film was finished after getting crowd funds. Most of the principal photography took place in Dhaka, Kushtia, Paksey paper mills and railway junction at Pabna.

== Release ==
Before its official release, the film has participated in several international film festivals. Lagvelki, an OTT platform from Bangladesh acquired distribution rights to the film and released it on February 12.

=== Critical response ===
At release, Prem Puran has gained a modest review. Fatin Hamama from The Dhaka Apologue commented that the film was "Yet Another Intolerable Romanticisation of the Middle Class" and also wrote, "there’s this lingering feeling that this film used the representation of the lower-middle-class as an aesthetic rather than what it really is."

== Accolades ==
Samia Othoi won the award for the best actress in the Mumbai International Short Film festival and the Chittagong Short Film festival in 2020. The film was a finalist in International Moving Film Festival 2019, a semifinalist in Jaipur Film World 2020, earned Official Selection from Goa Short Film Festival in 2019, Lift-Off Global Networks 2019, Kaaryat International Film Festival of India 2019, Chittagong Short Film Festival 2020, and Kuala Lumpur International Film Festival 2020.
