= Black Money (TV series) =

2025 Bengali language web film

- Poster of Black Money
- Genre: Drama, Crime
- Written by: Raihan Rafi
- Screenplay by: Anam Biswas, Ashraful Alam Shaon, Raihan Rafi
- Story by: Raihan Rafi
- Directed by: Raihan Rafi
- Starring: Masum Parvez Rubel, Puja Cherry Roy, Intekhab Dinar, Mir Naufel Ashrafi Jisan, Saidur Rahman Pavel, Salahuddin Lavlu, Subrata, Sumon Anowar, Arfan Mredha Shiblu, Rashed Mamun Apu, Mukit Zakaria, many others in different roles.
- Country of origin: Bangladesh
- Original language: Bengali

Production
- Producer: Mushfiqur Rahman Manzu
- Cinematography: Tahsin Rahman
- Production company: Bongo BD

Original release
- Release: 2 January 2025

Black Money (Bengali: ব্ল্যাক মানি) is a 2025 Bangladeshi web series. The web series is directed by Raihan Rafi and produced by Mushfiqur Rahman Manzu. The web series features Masum Parvez Rubel, Puja Cherry Roy, Intekhab Dinar, Mir Naufel Ashrafi Jisan, Saidur Rahman Pavel, Salahuddin Lavlu, Subrata, Sumon Anowar, Arfan Mredha Shiblu, Rashed Mamun Apu, Mukit Zakaria and many others in different roles. The web series are premiered on 2 January 2025 on Bongo BD.

== Premise ==
The series revolves around a truckload of cash. Late at night, a truck loaded with money arrives at a hotel. Gaining this information, a group of criminals led by Blade Mizan, Kana Nasir, and Bomb Jamal, arrives at the hotel to rob the truck. A brutal clash unfolds among them.

== Cast ==
- Masum Parvez Rubel - Benson Junaid
- Puja Cherry Roy - Miss Shaila
- Intekhab Dinar - Baitta Masum
- Mir Naufel Ashrafi Zishan - Blade Mizan
- Md. Saidur Rahman Pavel - Gullu
- Salahuddin Lavlu - MP
- Subrata - Hashem Jakaria
- Sumon Anowar - Bom Jamal
- Arfan Mredha Shiblu - Production Manager
- Rashed Mamun Apu - Second Truck Driver
- Mukit Zakaria - OC

== Synopsis ==
Late at night, a truck arrives at a hotel, transporting a large sum of money. When the news spreads, several local criminal gangs led by Blade Mizan, Baitta Masum, Bom Jamal, and Benson Junaid arrive at the hotel to rob the truck. A fierce clash ensues among the groups. The police arrive at the scene and seize the truck. The police stated that they had prior information about the money. The police continue to reveal more thrilling details about the money, but then a shocking twist turns the table completely.
