= Arman Parvez Murad =

Bangladeshi actor

- আরমান পারভেজ মুরাদ
- Born: Rajshahi, Bangladesh
- Occupation: Actor

Arman Parvez Murad is a Bangladeshi television and film actor. He won the Bangladesh National Film Award for Best Actor for his role in the film Ghani (2006).

== Works ==
- Bachelor (2004)
- Ghani (2006)
- Rabeya (2008)
- Amar Bondhu Rashed (2011)
- Shongram (2014)
- Niyoti (2016)
- August 1975 (2021)
- Myth of Love: A Known Story (2021)
- Birotto (2022)
