= Tanvin Sweety =

Bangladeshi actress and model

Tanvin Sweety Begum
- তানভিন সুইটি বেগম
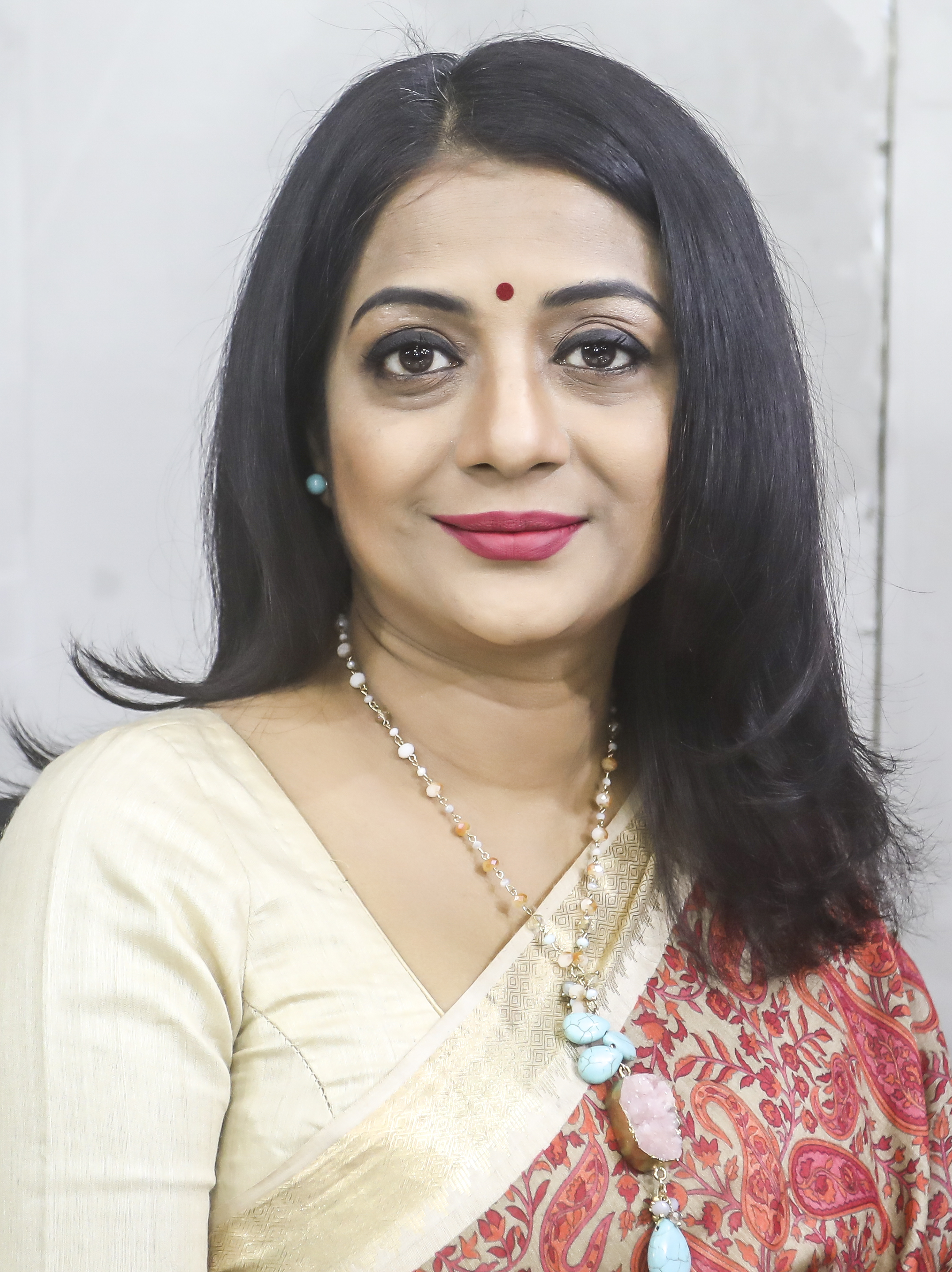
- Sweety in Dhaka, 2019
- Born: 30 August; Dhaka
- Occupations: actor, model
- Spouse: Ripon

Tanvin Sweety (born 30 August) is a Bangladeshi television, stage and film actress and model. As of 2005, she acted in more than a hundred television plays.

== Early life and career ==
In 1991, Sweety began her modeling career with Afzal Hossain's Diamond Brand.

Sweety joined a theater troupe called Theatre Group. She acted in stage plays including "Meraj Fakirer Ma", "Payer Awaaj Pawa Jaye", "Spordha", "Tomrai", "Ekhono Kritodash" and "Mukti". She debuted in television acting in the drama "Godhuli Logone". She also acted in "Shundori", "Chhoto Chhoto Dheu", "Jomila", "Dokanir Bou", "Haradhoner Naat-Jamai" and "Rupali Nodir Dheu". She acted in the film Banshi (2006) directed by Abu Sayeed.

Sweety also produced television dramas. Her production house is called Shonkhochil.

== Personal life ==
Sweety is married to Ripon and has no children of her own. Her father was Abdul Motalib. She has six sisters and two brothers.

== Criticism ==
Tanvin Sweety took a stand for the government during the repression of the dictatorship Awami League government on the students in the quota reform movement that took place in 2024. During the movement, a group of pro-autocracy Awami artists, including Tanvin Sweety, were active against the movement in a WhatsApp group called 'Alo Ashbei' led by actor Ferdous. After the non-cooperation movement, on September 3, 2024, some screenshots related to that WhatsApp group were spread on social media.
