= Punorjonmo Universe =

Fictional universe and TV series

Punorjonmo
- Poster
- Created by: Vicky Zahed
- Original work: Punorjonmo (July 2021)
- Owner: Vicky Zahed
- Years: 2021–present

Films and television
- Film(s): Shuklopokkho
- Television special(s): Punorjonmo TV specials

Punorjonmo (Bengali: পুনর্জন্ম, lit. 'The rebirth') is a Bangladeshi fictional universe and series of television specials and web films created by Vicky Zahed. The universe was established by crossing over common plot elements, settings, cast, and characters.

== Development ==
In July 2021, a television special called Punorjonmo by Vicky Zahed became popular after it was aired on Channel i. Later its sequel Punorjonmo 2 was produced. A web film named Shuklopokkho was made soon after which connected the story of Punorjonmo series. In September 2022, Vicky Zahed told the Bangla Tribune about his plan to create the "Punorjonmo Universe". He said that characters from Shuklopokkho and Punorjonmo series will be seen in Punorjonmo 3. Punorjonmo 3 was released on 1 October 2022. Director Vicky Zahed told Prothom Alo on 27 October 2022 that Punorjonmo: Antim Porbo, the last sequel, will probably come in Eid-ul-adha. Punorjonmo: Antim Porbo was later released on 30 June 2023.

== Television specials ==
| TV special | Release date | Director(s) | Ref. |
|---|---|---|---|
| Punorjonmo | 25 July 2021 | Vicky Zahed | |
| Punorjonmo 2 | 1 October 2021 | Vicky Zahed | |
| Punorjonmo 3 | 2 October 2022 | Vicky Zahed | |
| Punorjonmo: Antim Porbo | 30 June 2023 | Vicky Zahed | |
| Hajot | 24 June 2024 | Vicky Zahed | |

=== Punorjonmo 1 ===
After the airing of the first part, the audience demanded its sequel.

=== Punorjonmo 2 ===
After the popularity of Punorjonmo 1, Channel i aired its sequel on 1 October 2021. Apart from the characters of the previous special, Shahed Ali acted in this sequel. The sequel received over 2 million views on YouTube between October 1–4. It is known that Vicky Zahid spent one and a half months writing the story of the sequel.

=== Punorjonmo 3 ===
While filming Punorjonmo 2, Vicky Zahid wanted to make Punorjonmo 3. So when the second sequel became popular after airing, he discussed with the crew and actors and announced the next sequel. It was filmed from 16 to 18 September 2022. It got 2 million views in the day of its release and became the top video in the Bangladesh's trending category on YouTube.

=== Punorjonmo Antim Porbo ===
Director Vicky Zahed told Prothom Alo on 30 October 2022 that Punorjonmo: Antim Porbo, the last sequel, will probably come on Eid-ul-Fitr 2023. Punorjonmo: Antim Porbo was released on 30 June 2023 on Channel i

=== Hajot ===
It's a prequel of Punorjonmo series, story of Rafsan Hoque's father.

== Film ==
| Film | Release date | Director(s) | Ref. |
|---|---|---|---|
| Shuklopokkho | 11 August 2022 | Vicky Zahed | |

=== Shuklopokkho ===
On 11 August 2022, Punorjonmo Universe's web thriller film Shuklopokkho was released in Chorki. In this 96-minute web film, three university students go missing. So Manju, the character of the film, starts worrying about his lover Laboni.

== Series ==
| Series | Release date | Director(s) | Ref. |
|---|---|---|---|
| Punorjonmo: Director's Cut (Total 11 episode's) | 17 August 2023 | Vicky Zahed | |
| Untitled Spin-off | TBA | Vicky Zahed | |

=== Punorjonmo: Director's Cut ===
On 10 August, Channel I announced that they will release the Director's cut version of Punorjonmo series. The all parts of the universe will air together in a series of 11 episode's form on their OTT platform iScreen. The series was aired on iScreen on 17 August 2023.

=== Unitiled Spin-off Series ===
After the release of Punorjonmo: Antim Porbo, audience was confused and had many questions after the end of the last sequel. Director Vicky Zahed said that the universe will get a "Rafsan Haque" web series which will be available on iScreen.

== Cast and characters ==
- Afran Nisho as chef Rafsan Haque
- Imam Hossain Saju as Raju, a voice
- Mehazabien Chowdhury as Nila Haque, Rafsan's wife/Rokeya
- Khairul Basar as Niloy/Manju
- Shahed Ali as Nuru, Rafsan's driver
- Quazi Nawshaba Ahmed as Borsha, Rafsan's younger sister
- Abdullah Al Sentu as Kamal, a serial killer
- Faruque Ahmed as Idris Ali
- Ziaul Roshan as Humayun
- Sunerah Binte Kamal as Laboni
- Sharif Siraj as OC Kamrul

== Soundtracks ==
Title track: Drohe Jole Pure

- Performed by Ajoy Roy and Jarin Tasnim Ratri
- Track produced by Tamal Hadiul
- Lyric and composed by Mahmud Hayat Arpon

== Controversy ==
In 2023, Mahreen Ferdous alleged that Punorjonmo 3 was plagiarized from a story in her book Golpogulo Bari Geche. Vicky Zaheed on the other hand claimed that the story of Punorjonmo 3 coincidentally coincided with the story of Ferdous.

== Reception ==
Punorjonmo 1 and 2 became popular with viewers after their telecast on Channel i. Punorjonmo series uploaded to YouTube are given English subtitles due to response from foreign viewers. According to Channel i officials, both the specials have received a lot of positive reactions. According to Shah Alam Saju of The Daily Star, its TV specials were among the hottest TV works of 2021.

== Awards ==
| Year | Award Title | Category | Awardee | Result | Ref |
|---|---|---|---|---|---|
| 2021 | 2nd ICT–Channel i Digital Media Awards | Best Drama Director | Vicky Zahed | Won | |
| 2021 | 2nd ICT–Channel i Digital Media Awards | Best Actress | Mehazabien Chowdhury | Won | |
| 2021 | Meril-Prothom Alo Awards | Best Television Actor | Afran Nisho | Won | |
