= Masud Rana (2026 film) =

- Poster
- Bengali: মাসুদ রানা
- Directed by: Saikat Nasir
- Screenplay by: Saikat Nasir
- Story by: Qazi Anwar Hussain
- Based on: Dhwongsho Pahar by Qazi Anwar Hossain
- Produced by: Anjan Chowdhury
- Starring: Russell Rana; Puja Cherry; Sayeda Tithi Amni
- Production companies: Jaaz Multimedia; Impress Telefilm
- Distributed by: Jaaz Multimedia
- Release date: 28 May 2026
- Running time: 121 minutes
- Country: Bangladesh
- Language: Bengali

Masud Rana (Bengali: মাসুদ রানা) is a 2026 Bangladeshi Bengali-language spy thriller film. It is directed by Saikat Nasir under the banner of Jaaz Multimedia and Impress Telefilm. The lead characters are played by Russell Rana, Puja Cherry, Sayeda Tithi Amni. It is the first film of Russell Rana. It released on 28 May 2026, coinciding with Eid-al-Adha.

== Cast ==
- Russell Rana as Masud Rana
- Puja Cherry as Sohana
- Sayeda Tithi Amni as Nabaneeta
- Amit Hasan
- Tiger Robi
- Masum Basar
- Gazi Rakayet
- Maruf Akib
- Zeba Jannat
- Mirza Mahi

== Production ==
In 2020, Jaaz Multimedia announced the production of two films based on the character 'Masud Rana', created by Qazi Anwar Hossain. Then, in 2023, the first film, MR-9: Do or Die, was released. Although the main shooting of the second film was completed almost five years ago, the release was delayed for a long time due to work on a song and a few special scenes. Finally, after completing the shooting of the remaining scenes, the film was announced to be released on May 20, 2026.

== Marketing ==
The first poster of the book-style Masud Rana movie was released on May 20, 2026. The film's teaser was released on May 22, 2026. The film's trailer came 3 days later, on May 25.

== Music ==
The first song of the film, "O Dorodi Ki Mach", was released on 26 May 2026, which is an item song. It was sung by Mila and lyricsed and composed by Lincoln Roy Chowdhury. The title song of the film was released on 31 May. It was sung by Pantho Kanai, composed by Emon Saha and lyricsed by Abdul Aziz. The third song, "Puro Bangladesh", was released on 1 June, sung by Imran Mahmudul and Raka Poppy. It was lyricsed and composed by Shah Alam Sarkar.

== Release ==
On May 28 2026, coinciding with Eid-al-adha, the film was released in theaters in Bangladesh, clashing with Rockstar, Roid, Malik, Tosnos, Pinik, Officer, Bonolota Sen.

== Reception ==
=== Critical response ===
Writing for Prothom Alo, Saiful Samin provided a moderate review for Saikat Nasir's spy-thriller film Masud Rana (2026), describing it as a fast-paced and entertaining action movie, despite certain narrative weaknesses. The reviewer praised the film's high tempo, frequent action sequences, and musical numbers, noting that the brisk pacing prevents the story from dragging. While acknowledging that the narrative contains exaggerated scenes, plot inconsistencies, and unrealistic moments, Samin felt that the movie succeeds in providing pure entertainment for action enthusiasts. The performances of the lead cast received positive remarks. Russell Rana was noted for his physical fitness and confident body language in the action set-pieces, showing clear dedication to the titular role. Puja Cherry was highlighted for successfully balancing glamour with intense action sequences. Gazi Rakayet's portrayal of the antagonist was described as overly dramatic yet entertaining, particularly during a distinctive climax scene. The review concluded that while the film may not strictly adhere to Kazi Anwar Hossain's original novel or match Hollywood spy-thriller standards, it stands as an enjoyable effort within the local genre.

Sadikur Rahman of Samakal gave the film a critical review, noting that despite promising initial action sequences, it ultimately failed to live up to the spy-thriller genre, unintentionally turning into a comedy. Rahman criticized director Saikat Nasir for major logical inconsistencies, narrative oversights, and poor production details, such as unrealistic plot elements involving nuclear materials, abrupt geographic jumps, and misplaced song-and-dance numbers during intense scenes. While acknowledging that Russell Rana fitted the physical profile of Masud Rana, the review highlighted a lack of nuanced performance and character detail required for the iconic character.

Wroted by Wahidur Rahman in Bonik Barta's survey "The film has faced severe criticism on social media for its weak VFX, poor use of AI technology, and inconsistent storyline". Wroted by FI Deepu in Jugantor's survey "The action scenes were good. Some scenes also had international quality touches".
