= AKA (TV series) =

2025 Bangladeshi psychological social thriller web series

- Poster
- Genre: Social; Thriller
- Screenplay by: Vicky Zahed
- Story by: Vicky Zahed
- Directed by: Vicky Zahed
- Starring: See below
- Country of origin: Bangladesh
- Original language: Bengali
- No. of seasons: 1
- No. of episodes: 7

Production
- Production company: Alpha-i

Original release
- Network: Hoichoi
- Release: 4 September 2025

Aka is a 2025 Bangladeshi psychological-social thriller web series. It was written and directed by Vicky Zahed. It consists of seven episodes. Afran Nisho and Masuma Rahman Nabila star in the lead roles. The series premiered on Hoichoi on 4 September 2025.

== Cast ==
- Afran Nisho as Abul Kalam Azad "AKA"
- Masuma Rahman Nabila as Megha
- Imtiaz Barshon as Sohel
- Tazji Syeda
- Jayanta Chattopadhyay
- Shahed Ali
- Azizul Hakim as Kaiser, AKA's uncle
- A.K. Azad Shetu as rockstar Hossain
- Samonty Shoumi as Sweety

== Reception ==
=== Critical response ===
Soumyajyoti Kar of High On Films praised the series' mix of psychological drama and vigilante thriller elements and commended director Vicky Zahed for creating a dark, suspenseful atmosphere and lauded Afran Nisho's nuanced lead performance, concluding that the series delivers a compelling character-driven narrative despite some familiar genre tropes. Habibur Rahman Khan Arif of Bangla Movie Database praised the series as an engaging social thriller with grounded storytelling and poetic dialogue and highlighted the dark narrative's effective depiction of psychological conflict and lauded Afran Nisho's performance, calling the project a successful OTT comeback for Nisho and director Vicky Zahed.

=== Audience response ===
Prothom Alo noted, the trailer for series received overwhelmingly positive audience reactions on social media. Viewers expressed high anticipation for Afran Nisho's return to OTT after a two-year hiatus, praising his distinct look and the intriguing, dark narrative centered on isolation and revenge. Bangla News 24 noted, the series received largely negative audience reactions upon release, viewers criticized its weak storyline, inconsistent screenwriting, and unnatural dialogue, noting that poor direction and technical execution made the narrative fragmented and unengaging. Channel i noted, the trailer for series garnered widespread enthusiasm on social media, viewers praised its dramatic tension, mysterious plot and film-grade cinematic quality, with Afran Nisho's strong screen presence driving high anticipation for the release.

== Accolades ==
Year	Award	Category	Recipient	Result	Ref.
2026	Blender's Choice-The Daily Star OTT & Digital Content Awards	Best Actor (popular)	Afran Nisho	Won	
2026	Blender's Choice-The Daily Star OTT & Digital Content Awards	Best Director (popular)	Vicky Zahed	Won	
