= Poramon 2 =

Bangladeshi romantic drama film

- Theatrical release poster
- Directed by: Raihan Rafi
- Written by: Delowar Hossain Dil
- Produced by: Abdul Aziz
- Starring: Siam Ahmed; Puja Cherry Roy; Fazlur Rahman Babu; Anwara Begum; Bapparaj
- Cinematography: Saiful Shahin
- Music by: Emon Saha; Akassh; Raja Narayan Deb
- Production company: Jaaz Multimedia
- Distributed by: Jaaz Multimedia
- Release date: 16 June 2018
- Running time: 146 Minute
- Country: Bangladesh
- Language: Bengali
- Box office: est.৳1 crore (equivalent to ৳1.5 crore or US$130,000 in 2024)

Poramon 2 (Bengali: পোড়ামন ২) is a Bangladeshi Bengali romantic drama film directed by Raihan Rafi and produced by Abdul Aziz. It is distributed by Jaaz Multimedia. Starring in the lead roles are Siam Ahmed, Puja Cherry, and Bapparaj. It is the sequel of 2013 film Poramon starring Symon Sadik and Mahiya Mahi. The film was released on Eid al-Fitr of 2018. The film was a commercial success. It is unofficially remake of Tamil film Paruthiveeran (2007) directed by Ameer Sultan.

== Plot ==
Only daughter of a day labourer Kafil Mia, Pori loves his own village's childhood friend named Sujon. In childhood, they were friends. When they became adult, they fell in love with each other. But it is unfortunate that Pori's family didn't accept Sujon. Pori's family attempted to kill Sujon. After seeing this scene, Pori became devastated. Her family forcibly tried to get him married. When it was her haldi night before his wedding, she recalled his lover Sujon and cried much and much. Then she decided to commit suicide by hanging in tree by a rope. After Sujon woke up, he saw her lover committed suicide and cried much at night. Next Morning, he killed her lover Pori's dead body to realize Pori's family that Pori had not committed suicide rather killed by her own lover. Pori's family carried Pori's dead body and beaten Sujon. Sujon was tensed that will her lover's funeral be held. He dugged grave with his own hand for her lover. It was very tragic end. Pori committed suicide due to her selfish family

== Cast ==
- Siam Ahmed as Sujon Shah
- Puja Cherry as Pori
- Bapparaj as Norshed
- Fazlur Rahman Babu

== Soundtrack ==
Poramon 2 soundtrack
| No. | Title | Length |
|---|---|---|
| 1. | "Number 1 Hero" | 3:22 |
| 2. | "O Hey Shyam" | 3:20 |
| 3. | "Suto Kata Ghuri" | 3:50 |
| 4. | "Poramon Title Track" | 3:05 |
| 5. | "Kichhudin Mone Mone" | 3:20 |
| 6. | "Keno Piriti Baraila" | 3:31 |
| 7. | "Bojhena Poramon" | 2:58 |

== Awards ==
| Year | Awards | Category | Recipients | Result | Ref |
|---|---|---|---|---|---|
| 2018 | Bachsas Awards | Best Newcomer | Puja Cherry Roy | Won | |
| 2018 | Meril Prothom Alo Awards | Best Actor | Siam Ahmed | Won | |
| 2018 | Meril Prothom Alo Awards | Best Actress | Puja Cherry Roy | Won | |
| 2018 | Meril Prothom Alo Awards | Best Playback Female | Dilshad Nahar Kona for O Hey Shyam | Won | |
| 2018 | Meril Prothom Alo Awards | Best Playback Male | Imran Mahmudul for O Hey Shyam | Won | |
