= Dahan (2018 film) =

Bengali film

- Theatrical release poster
- Directed by: Raihan Rafi
- Written by: Delowar Hossain Dil
- Produced by: Abdul Aziz
- Starring: Siam Ahmed; Puja Cherry Roy; Zakia Bari Momo; Fazlur Rahman Babu
- Music by: Imran Mahmudul; Akassh; Bushra Shahriar; Emon Saha
- Production company: Jaaz Multimedia
- Distributed by: Jaaz Multimedia
- Release date: 30 November 2018
- Running time: 129 Minutes
- Country: Bangladesh
- Language: Bengali

Dahan (Bengali: দহন) is a Bangladeshi Bengali socio-political drama film directed by Raihan Rafi and produced by Abdul Aziz. It was distributed by Jaaz Multimedia. It stars Siam Ahmed, Puja Cherry, Zakia Bari Momo, and Fazlur Rahman Babu in the lead roles. Dahan is loosely based on a true incident of metro city Dhaka. Music was Directed By Rizvi Hasan.

== Cast ==
- Siam Ahmed as Tula
- Puja Cherry as Asha
- Zakia Bari Momo as Journalist Maya
- Fazlur Rahman Babu as Leader
- Sushoma Sarkar as Nurse
- Tariq Anam Khan as Cameo Role
- Raisul Islam Asad Cameo Role
- Monira Mithu as Asha's Mother

== Soundtrack ==
Dahan

Soundtrack album by Imran Mahmudul, Akassh, Bushra Shahriar and Aryan Ashik
- Released: 5 October 2018
- Recorded: 2018
- Genre: Feature film soundtrack
- Length: 14:00
- Language: Bangla
- Label: Jaaz multimedia

Dahan soundtrack
No.	Title	Length
1.	"Hajir Biriyani"	3:32
2.	"Premer Baksho"	3:18
3.	"Shokal Hashe"	4:05
4.	"Rahim Rahman"	3:05
5.	"Khacar Pakhi"
