= Vicky Zahed =

Bangladeshi film and television director

- Born: Dhaka, Bangladesh
- Occupations: Film and television director, writer
- Years active: 2010–present
- Notable work: Punorjonmo Universe
- Awards: Channel I Digital Media Award for Best Director

Vicky Zahed is a Bangladeshi film and television director. He won Channel i Digital Media Awards at the Best Director category for his making the television drama Punorjonmo 2 (2021).

== Early life ==
Zahed Born on 29 August 1990 in Dhaka, Bangladesh. He studied at Textile Engineering at the University of Dhaka.

== Career ==
Vicky Zahed began his career by making short films in 2010. He is popular for making thriller stories. Such stories are not seen in contemporary works of Bangladesh. His directorial debut short film is The Disguise in (2012). His directorial short film Moments (2016) received a good response from audience and his directorial debut television drama is The Life of Jalil in (2019). His television series Punorjonmo Universe received immense popularity among the audience. He won the Blender's Choice-The Daily Star OTT & Digital Content Awards-2022 for the Best director category for his webfilm Redrum (2022).

== Works ==
=== Feature film ===
Key
†	Denotes films that have not yet been released

Year	Film	Director	Screenplay	Writer	Notes	Ref.
2026	Pulsirat †	Yes	Yes	Yes	Directorial debut film	
2026	Khalnayak †	Yes	Yes	Yes	Filming	

=== Web film ===
Key
†	Denotes films that have not yet been released

Year	Work	Director	Screenwriter	Story writer	Note	Ref.
2022	Redrum	Yes	Yes	Yes	Debut webfilm on Chorki	
2022	Shoklupokkho	Yes	Yes	Yes	Webfilm on Chorki	
2024	Ondhokarer Gaan	Yes	Yes	Yes	Webfilm on Binge	
2025	Neel Shukh	Yes	Yes	Yes	Webfilm on Binge	

=== TV series ===
Year	Title	Director	Screenwriter	Story writer	Notes	Ref.
2023	The Silence	Yes	Yes	Yes	Series on Binge	
2023	Ami Ki Tumi	Yes	Yes	Yes	Series on iScreen	
2024	Rumi	Yes	Yes	Yes	Series on Hoichoi	
2024	Tikit	Yes	Yes	Yes	Series on Chorki	
2024	Ararat	Yes	Yes	Yes	Series on Binge	
2024	Chokro	Yes	Yes	Yes	Series on iScreen	
2025	AKA	Yes	Yes	Yes	Series on Hoichoi	
2026	Chokro 2	Yes	Yes	Yes	Series on iScreen	
2026	Pran Bhomra †	Yes	Yes	Yes	Series on iScreen	

=== Television drama ===
Year	Drama	Director	Screenwriter	Story writer	Note
2019	The Life of Jalil	Yes	Yes	Yes	
2020	Trophy	Yes	Yes	Yes	
2020	Rehnuma	Yes	Yes	Yes	
2020	Jonmodaag	Yes	Yes	Yes	
2020	Irina	Yes	Yes	Yes	
2021	Majnu	Yes	Yes	Yes	
2021	Chondopoton	Yes	Yes	Yes	
2021	Lovers Food Van	Yes	No	Yes	
2021	Charer Master	Yes	Yes	No	
2021	Kaykobad	Yes	Yes	Yes	
2021	Chirokal Aaj	Yes	Yes	Yes	
2021	Mon Oborodh	No	Yes	Yes	
2021	Ditiyo Shuchona	Yes	Yes	Yes	
2021	Punorjonmo	Yes	Yes	Yes	
2021	Tumi Arekti Din Thako	Yes	Yes	Yes	
2021	Kuasha	Yes	No	No	
2021	Punorjonmo 2	Yes	Yes	Yes	
2022	Prayoshchitto	Yes	Yes	No	
2022	Shesh Dekha	Yes	Yes	Yes	
2022	Ghun	Yes	Yes	Yes	
2022	Champa House	Yes	Yes	No	
2023	Kajoler Dinratri	Yes	Yes	No	
2023	Punorjonmo 3	Yes	Yes	Yes	
2024	Punorjonmo Antim Porbo	Yes	Yes	Yes	
2024	Tithidor	Yes	Yes	No	
2025	Prakritojon	Yes	Yes	No	

=== Short films ===
Year	Work	Director	Writer	Note
2012	The Disguise	Yes	Yes	
2012	Exile of Writing	Yes	Yes	
2013	Mister X	Yes	Yes	
2014	Sonar Horin	Yes	Yes	
2014	Choix	Yes	Yes	
2016	Moments	Yes	Yes	
2016	Obisshash	Yes	Yes	
2016	Behind The Sins	No	Yes	
2016	Maya	Yes	Yes	
2016	Deyal	Yes	Yes	
2017	Okkhor	Yes	Yes	
2017	Durbeen	Yes	Yes	
2017	Roop	Yes	Yes	
2017	The Hero	Yes	Yes	
2017	Aalo	Yes	Yes	
2018	Ushner Attohotta	Yes	Yes	
2018	Aaj Amar Pala	Yes	Yes	
2018	Bandhobi	Yes	Yes	
2018	The Ring	Yes	Yes	
2019	Rain Love	Yes	Yes	
2019	Little Rome Cafe	Yes	Yes	
2021	Action	Yes	Yes	
2021	Lal Katan Nil Dakat	Yes	No	
2024	Ekti Khola Jalana	Yes	Yes	

=== Others credits ===
List of Vicky Zahed's other role credits
Year	Work	Role	Note
2012	Excile of Waiting	Mahfuz	Short film; comeo appearance
2013	Once Upon A Time In A Country	Young Rebel	Short film; comeo appearance
2014	Sonar Horin	Fighter	Short film; comeo appearance
2016	Payra	—N/a	As producer
2016	Behind The Sins	—N/a	As producer
2016	Maya	—N/a	As producer
2017	Neera	—N/a	As producer
2021	Punorjonmo	—N/a	As co-producer
2021	Punorjonmo 2	—N/a	As co-producer

== Awards ==
Year	Award	Category	Work	Result	Ref.
2022	Channel i Digital Media Awards	Best Director	Punorjonmo 2	Won	
2023	Blender's Choice-The Daily Star OTT & Digital Content Awards	Best Director (critics)	Redrum	Won	
2023	Channel i Digital Media Awards	Best Director	Punorjonmo 3	Won	
2026	BIFA Awards	Best OTT Director	Chokro 2	Won	
2026	Blender's Choice-The Daily Star OTT & Digital Content Awards	Best Director (popular category)	AKA	Won	
